= Bold Ruckus Stakes =

- Class: Restricted stakes
- Location: Woodbine Racetrack; Toronto, Ontario, Canada
- Inaugurated: 1996
- Race type: Thoroughbred - Flat racing
- Website: woodbineentertainment.com

Race information
- Distance: Six furlong sprint
- Surface: Turf
- Track: Left-handed
- Qualification: Three-year-olds (Ontario Sire Stakes program)
- Weight: Allowances
- Purse: $125,000

The Bold Ruckus Stakes is a former Thoroughbred horse race that ran annually in mid June at Woodbine Racetrack in Toronto, Ontario, Canada. Inaugurated in 1996, it was an Ontario Sire Stakes. It was a race for three-year-olds and up and ran over a distance of 6 furlongs on turf and carried a purse of $125,000.

The race was named to honor Canadian Horse Racing Hall of Fame inductee, Bold Ruckus.

== Winners ==
Year	Winner	Jockey	Trainer	Owner	Time
2019	Souper Hot	Eurico da Silva	Mike Mattine	Carlo D'Amato and Stacey Van Camp	1:09.42
2018	Eskiminzin	Gary Boulanger	Carlos Grant	Jecara Farms Corp.	1:10.66
2017	Katalox	David Moran	Ricky Griffiths	Racing Canada Inc. and Debmar Stables	1:10.66
2016	Songs and Laughter	Eurico da Silva	Robert Tiller	Rolph Davis	1:09.62
2015	Seffeara	Gary Boulanger	Steve Owens	Empress Stables	1:09.13
2014	Flashy Margaritta	Patrick Husbands	Ralph Biamonte	Danny M. Lococo and M. Biamonte	1:09.84
2013	Langstaff	Luis Contreras	Robert Tiller	Rolph Davis	1:09.20
2012	Jenna's Wabbit	Eurico da Silva	Ralph Biamonte	Ralph Biamonte	1:09.98
2011	Citius	Omar Moreno	Ralph Biamonte	Danny M. Lococo and M. Biamonte	1:09.11
2009	Me the Sea and G T	Tyler Pizarro	Steve Owens	G T Heat Stable	1:08.65
2008	Stuck in Traffic	David Clark	Nicholas Gonzalez	MAD Racing & Martha Gonzalez	1:10.68
2007	Legal Move	Patrick Husbands	Mark E. Casse	Woodford Racing LLC	1:08.79
2006	Tothemoonandback	James McAleney	Reade Baker	Robert Smithen et al.	1:09.28
2005	Quick in Deed	Ray Sabourin	Abraham Katryan	Kelynack Racing	1:13.26
2004	Dashing Admiral	Todd Kabel	Sid C. Attard	John & Jessica Pastorek	1:09.33
2003	Tusayan	Emile Ramsammy	Laurie Silvera	L. Silvera & S. Kilambi	1:12.02
2002	Mighty Quinn	Ray Sabourin	Malcolm Pierce	Windways Farm/Quinn Stable	1:12.00
2001	San Mont Andreas,	Simon Husbands	Desmond Maynard	R. & A. Christman	1:11.45
2000	Flashy Dr. Don	Todd Kabel	David MacLean	Herbert W. Chambers	1:08.89
1999	Don't Seven Out	David Clark	Ralph Biamonte	C. & A. Chipman	1:09.32
1998	Goldmart Prince	Kelly MacKay	Wray I. Lawrence	Goldmart Farms	1:09.20
1997	Mitchellville	Ray Sabourin	John P. MacKenzie	A. & M. J. Lamb	1:11.00
