= Eclipse Stakes (Canada) =

- Class: Grade II
- Location: Woodbine Racetrack; Toronto, Ontario Canada
- Inaugurated: 1956
- Race type: Thoroughbred - Flat racing
- Website: web.archive.org/web/20100316214346/http://www.woodbineentertainment.com:80/qct/default.asp

Race information
- Distance: 1 1/16 miles (8.5 furlongs)
- Surface: Tapeta
- Track: left-handed
- Qualification: Four-years-old & up
- Weight: Allowances
- Purse: $153,450 (2016)

The Eclipse Stakes is a Canadian Thoroughbred horse race run annually at Woodbine Racetrack in Toronto, Ontario. Held during the second half of May, the Grade II race is open to horses, four-years of age and older. It is contested over a distance of 1 1/16 miles (8.5 furlongs) on Polytrack synthetic dirt and currently offers a purse of $153.450.

Inaugurated as the Eclipse Handicap at Toronto's Greenwood Raceway in 1956, it was moved to Woodbine Racetrack in 1967. Since inception, it has been contested at various distances:

- 1 mile : 1959–1960 at Greenwood Raceway
- 1 1/16 miles : 1956, 1958 at Greenwood Raceway, since 1967 at Woodbine Racetrack
- 1 1/8 miles : 1957, 1961–1963 at Greenwood Raceway
- 1 3/16 miles : 1964–1966 at Greenwood Raceway

The race was not run in 2021.

== Records ==
Speed record: (Through 1998, times were recorded in fifths of a second. Since 1999 they are in hundredths of a second)

- 1:42.40 : Ambassador B. (1977) (at current distance of 1 1/16 miles)
- 1:42:40 : Artie's Storm (2022)

Most wins:

- 3 - Are You Kidding Me (2015, 2016, 2018)
- 2 - Frost King (1982, 1983)
- 2 - Royal Chocolate (1974, 1975)

Most wins by an owner:

- 5 - Stafford Farms (1974, 1975, 1977, 1979, 1980)
- 6 - Frank Stronach and/or Stronach Stables (1993, 1995, 2000, 2003, 2004, 2012)

Most wins by a jockey:

- 7 - Robin Platts (1968, 1971, 1975, 1977, 1980, 1982, 1983)

Most wins by a trainer:

- 6 - Gil Rowntree (1974, 1975, 1977, 1979, 1980, 1986)
- 7 - Roger L. Attfield (1990, 1991, 1992, 2005, 2007, 2015, 2016)

== Winners ==
Year	Winner	Age	Jockey	Trainer	Owner	Time
2026	Maycocks Bay	5	Sofia Vives	Michael Stidham	Godolphin	1:43.05
2025	Classic Mo Town	5	Eswan Flores	Martin Drexler	Bruno Schickedanz	1:42.97
2024	Palazzi	6	Sahin Civaci	Mark E. Casse	Gary Barber	1:43.86
2023	Treason	5	Kazushi Kimura	Josie Carroll	LNJ Foxwoods & MSK Racing Ventures	1:43.09
2022	Artie's Storm	4	David Moran	Paul M. Buttigieg	Buttigieg Training Centre	1:42.40
	no race 2021					
2020	Skywire	4	Rafael Hernandez	Mark Casse	Gary Barber & Lucio Tucci	1:44.12
2019	Souper Tapit	5	Patrick Husbands	Mark Casse	Live Oak Plantation	1:42.39
2018	Are You Kidding Me	8	Rafael Hernandez	Roger L. Attfield	Ronald K. Kirk, John C. Bates, Michael Riordan	1:43.14
2017	Dragon Bay	4	Gary Boulanger	Stuart Simon	McLellan/McLellan/Simon	1:43.79
2016	Are You Kidding Me	6	Alan Garcia	Roger L. Attfield	Ronald K. Kirk, John C. Bates, Michael Riordan	1:44.95
2015	Are You Kidding Me	5	Alan Garcia	Roger L. Attfield	Ronald K. Kirk, John C. Bates, Michael Riordan	1:42.76
2014	Frac Daddy	4	Luis Contreras	Kenneth G. McPeek	Magic City Thoroughbreds	1:42.74
2013	Alpha Bettor	5	Justin Stein	Daniel J. Vella	Bulldog Racing	1:42.69
2012	Hunter's Bay	5	Emma-Jayne Wilson	Reade Baker	Stronach Stables	1:42.63
2011	Fifty Proof	5	Justin Stein	Ian Black	Kinghaven Farms/Fielding et al.	1:42.56
2010	Southdale	4	Emma-Jayne Wilson	Ian Black	Roderick Ferguson	1:43.77
2009	Ice Bear	5	Chantal Sutherland	Macdonald Benson	Augustin Stable	1:43.38
2008	True Metropolitan	6	James McAleney	Terry Jordan	Bob Cheema	1:43.59
2007	Palladio	5	Richard Dos Ramos	Roger Attfield	Haras Santa Maria de Araras	1:43.07
2006	Arch Hall	5	Patrick Husbands	Mark E. Casse	Melnyk Racing	1:44.10
2005	Honolua Storm	4	Gerry Olguin	Roger Attfield	Roger Attfield	1:43.77
2004	Mark One	5	Robert Landry	Daniel J. Vella	Stronach Stables	1:46.70
2003	Phantom Light	4	Robert Landry	Daniel J. Vella	Stronach Stables	1:43.62
2002	Lil Personalitee	4	Patrick Husbands	John Cardella	California Stable	1:44.45
2001	Graeme Hall	4	Robert Landry	Todd A. Pletcher	L. & E. Melnyk	1:44.14
2000	Black Cash	5	Mickey Walls	Joe Orseno	Stronach Stables	1:45.64
1999	Social Charter	4	Patrick Husbands	Sean Hall	Robert Sangster	1:43.00
1998	Ocean Squall	5	Na Somsanith	Audre Cappuccitti	Audre Cappuccitti	1:44.00
1997	Stephanotis	4	Mickey Walls	Barbara J. Minshall	Minshall Farms	1:44.40
1996	Mt. Sassafras	4	Robert Landry	Barbara J. Minshall	Minshall Farms	1:44.20
1995	Northern Lance	4	Emile Ramsammy	Daniel J. Vella	Frank Stronach	1:44.00
1994	Brock Street	4	Laurie Gulas	Reade Baker	Baker/Knuppe/Taylor	1:43.80
1993	Blitzer	4	Robert Landry	Daniel J. Vella	Frank Stronach	1:45.20
1992	Shudanz	4	Don Seymour	Roger Attfield	Kinghaven et al.	1:44.80
1991	Izvestia	4	Don Seymour	Roger Attfield	Kinghaven Farms	1:43.60
1990	Imperial Colony	5	Don Seymour	Roger Attfield	Kinghaven Farms	1:45.00
1989	Regal Classic	4	Sandy Hawley	James E. Day	Sam-Son / Windfields	1:43.80
1988	New York Swell	5	Craig Perret	Gerry Belanger	Earle I. Mack	1:43.80
1987	Gold Alert	4	Dave Penna	Alton Quanbeck	Maud McDougald	1:45.40
1986	Ten Gold Pots	5	Gary Stahlbaum	Gil Rowntree	B. K. Y. Stable	1:46.40
1985	Cool Northerner	4	Gary Stahlbaum	Jacques Dumas	F. & P. D' Andrea	1:47.40
1984	Ask Muhammad	5	Richard Dos Ramos	Michael Silvera	Gordon F. Hall	1:44.40
1983	Frost King	5	Robin Platts	Bill Marko	Ted Smith & B. Marko	1:46.40
1982	Frost King	4	Robin Platts	Bill Marko	Ted Smith & B. Marko	1:43.40
1981	Driving Home	4	David Clark	Glenn Magnusson	CFCW Racing	1:44.00
1980	Overskate	5	Robin Platts	Gil Rowntree	Stafford Farms	1:43.60
1979	Bruce South	4	Joey Belowus	Gil Rowntree	Stafford Farms	1:46.40
1978	Dancing Relation	4	B. Smythe	Jerry G. Lavigne	Paddockhurst Stable	1:48.80
1977	Ambassador B.	4	Robin Platts	Gil Rowntree	Stafford Farms	1:42.40
1976	Gallant Topic	4	B. Argent	Carl F. Chapman	A. Smith	1:47.40
1975	Royal Chocolate	5	Robin Platts	Gil Rowntree	Stafford Farms	1:43.80
1974	Royal Chocolate	4	Hugo Dittfach	Gil Rowntree	Stafford Farms	1:43.20
1973	Twice Lucky	6	Avelino Gomez	Donnie Walker	Conn Smythe	1:42.80
1972	Fabe Count	4	Lloyd Duffy	Jerry G. Lavigne	Parkview Stable	1:43.00
1971	Dance Act	5	Robin Platts	L. Grant	Green Hills Farm	1:44.80
1970	Amber Orbit	4	Herb Hinojosa	Carl F. Chapman	Garden City/W. Latimer	1:43.60
1969	No Reasoning	6	John LeBlanc	Jerry G. Lavigne	Parkview Stable	1:44.20
1968	Johnny's Form	5	Robin Platts	Jim Fisher	Hillcrest Stable	1:43.40
1967	He's A Smoothie	4	Herb Hinojosa	Warren Beasley	William R. Beasley	1:42.80
1966	Gauchesco	5	Wayne Harris	George S. Nemett	Dane Hall Acres	1.58.00
1965	Well To Do *	4	Wayne Harris	J. Mort Hardy	Prime Stable	1:57.80
1964	Broadway John W.	4	Chris Rogers	Alfred I. Taylor	T. A. Dalton	1:59.00
1963	Lord Quillo	4	Sam McComb	Edward Mann	Sarto Desnoyers	1:51.00
1962	Cyprian Cat	6	C. McKee	John J. Mack	John J. Mack	1:49.20
1961	Moony	5	Avelino Gomez	Frank Merrill, Jr.	Gian & Tosch	1:50.60
1960	Anita's Son	4	Hugo Dittfach	Arthur H. Warner	Lanson Farm	1:36.80
1959	Grey Monarch	4	Ben Sorensen	Gordon J. McCann	Windfields Farm	1:36.20
1958	Mister Jive	4	Eugene A. Rodriquez	George M. Carter	John L. Appelbaum	1:43.80
1957	Swamp Fox	4	Vic Bovine	D. Cardella	F. Corlick	1:55.80
1956	Fleet Path	4	H. B. Wilson	Arthur H. Warner	Lanson Farm	1:43.40

*In 1965, Brother Leo finished first but was disqualified and set back to second place.

== See also ==
- List of Canadian flat horse races
