= Bunty Lawless Stakes =

- Class: Restricted Stakes
- Location: Woodbine Racetrack; Toronto, Ontario, Canada
- Inaugurated: 1975
- Race type: Thoroughbred – Flat racing
- Website: woodbineentertainment.com

Race information
- Distance: 1 mile (8.0 furlongs)
- Surface: Turf
- Track: Left-handed
- Qualification: Three-year-olds & up (Ontario Sire Stakes)
- Weight: Assigned
- Purse: $96,563 (2015)

The Bunty Lawless Stakes is a Thoroughbred horse race run annually at Woodbine Racetrack in Toronto, Canada. An Ontario Sire Stakes, it is a race for horses age three and older. Run near the end of October, it is contested over a distance of 1 mile (8 furlongs) on turf and currently carries a purse of $96,563.

Inaugurated in 1975, it is named in honor of Canadian Horse Racing Hall of Fame inductee, Bunty Lawless (1935–1956) who, in a 1951 poll conducted by Canadian Press, was voted "Canadian Horse of the Half Century."

In 2006 the race was run at a distance of 8 furlongs and 70 yards on Polytrack.

== Records ==
Speed record: (Through 1998, Woodbine times were recorded in fifths of a second. Since 1999 they are in hundredths of a second)

Most wins:

- 3 – Rahy's Attorney (2007, 2009, 2010)
- 2 – Frost King (1981, 1982)
- 2 – Balafran (1984, 1985)
- 2 – Control Zone (1989, 1990)
- 2 – Steady Ruckus (2000, 2002)
- 2 – Tusayan (2003, 2005)
- 2 – Pender Harbour (2011, 2012)

Most wins by an owner:

- 2 – Ted Smith/Bill Marko (1981, 1982)
- 2 – Bala Glen Farm (1984, 1985)
- 2 – Kinghaven Farms (1989, 1990)
- 2 – Edward Lang (2000, 2002)
- 2 – Srinivas Kilambi/Laurie Silvera (2003, 2005)
- 2 – Giffin/Andrews/Lazaruk (2011, 2012)

Most wins by a jockey:

- 3 – Robin Platts (1976, 1980, 1992)
- 3 – Lloyd Duffy (1981, 1982, 1991)
- 3 – Luis Contreras (2011, 2012, 2015)

Most wins by a trainer:

- 3 – Roger Attfield (1980, 1989, 1990)

== Winners ==
| Year | Winner | Age | Jockey | Trainer | Owner | Time |
|---|---|---|---|---|---|---|
| 2015 | Seen It All Before | 6 | Luis Contreras | Ashlee Brnjas | Colebrook Farms | 1:36.00 |
| 2014 | San Nicola Thunder | 4 | Justin Stein | John Cardella | Paul & Joe Pirone | 1:35.89 |
| 2013 | Ultimate Destiny | 4 | Eurico Rosa Da Silva | Alec Fehr | Alex Fehr | 1:43.03 |
| 2012 | Pender Harbour | 4 | Luis Contreras | Mike De Paulo | Giffin/Andrews/Lazaruk | 1:36.83 |
| 2011 | Pender Harbour | 3 | Luis Contreras | Mike De Paulo | Giffin/Andrews/Lazaruk | 1:38.66 |
| 2010 | Rahy's Attorney | 6 | Slade Callaghan | Ian Black | Ellie Boje Farm et al. | 1:36.36 |
| 2009 | Rahy's Attorney | 5 | Robert Landry | Ian Black | Ellie Boje Farm et al. | 1:37.81 |
| 2008 | Sand Cove | 3 | Richard Dos Ramos | Roger Attfield | Ralph Johnson | 1:34.94 |
| 2007 | Rahy's Attorney | 3 | Robert Landry | Ian Black | Ellie Boje Farm et al. | 1:37.66 |
| 2006 | Arch Hall | 5 | Patrick Husbands | Mark E. Casse | Eugene Melnyk | 1:43.61 |
| 2005 | Tusayan | 5 | Todd Kabel | Laurie Silvera | Srinivas Kilambi/Silvera | 1:37.37 |
| 2004 | Millfleet | 3 | Jill Scharfstein | Hugo Dittfach | Margaret Squires | 1:39.07 |
| 2003 | Tusayan | 3 | Emile Ramsammy | Laurie Silvera | Srinivas Kilambi/Silvera | 1:38.90 |
| 2002 | Steady Ruckus | 5 | Jim McAleney | Gil Rowntree | Edward Lang | 1:37.38 |
| 2001 | Starbeau | 3 | Patrick Husbands | Mike Keogh | Gustav Schickedanz | 1:38.62 |
| 2000 | Steady Ruckus | 4 | James McAleney | Gil Rowntree | Edward Lang | 1:34.81 |
| 1999 | River Boat | 6 | Slade Callaghan | Frank Huarte | Frank Huarte | 1:38.60 |
| 1998 | Randy Regent | 4 | Na Somsanith | Mark Frostad | Sam-Son Farm | 1:35.00 |
| 1997 | Terremoto | 6 | Todd Kabel | Beverly Buck | J. & J. Everatt | 1:33.80 |
| 1996 | Influent | 5 | Jean-Luc Samyn | Howard Tesher | R. Kumble/M. Becker | 1:38.00 |
| 1995 | Elated Guy | 6 | Emile Ramsammy | Robert P. Tiller | F. DiGiulio & F. DiGiulio Jr. | 1:36.80 |
| 1994 | Myrtle Irene | 5 | Sandy Hawley | David C. Brown | M/M D.G.McClelland | 1:35.20 |
| 1993 | Shiny Key | 5 | Mark Larsen | Alton Quanbeck | D. Morgan Firestone | 1:37.20 |
| 1992 | Big Ruckus | 4 | Robin Platts | Michael J. Wright | Bruno Schickedanz | 1:40.40 |
| 1991 | Stormy Gladiator | 5 | Lloyd Duffy | Fred H. Loschke | Hammer Kopf Farm | 1:37.80 |
| 1990 | Control Zone | 7 | Don Seymour | Roger Attfield | Kinghaven Farms | 1:35.00 |
| 1989 | Control Zone | 6 | Don Seymour | Roger Attfield | Kinghaven Farms | 1:37.60 |
| 1988 | Bouncing Brave | 3 | Dave Penna | Bud Carter | P. Lamantia/J. Russell | 1:40.40 |
| 1987 | Time Lap | 3 | Richard Grubb | Jack Reid | Rose Hill Farms | 1:41.20 |
| 1986 | Boulder Run | 3 | Jack Lauzon | Jerry G. Lavigne | R. Doe/B. Hutzel | 1:38.60 |
| 1985 | Balafran | 4 | Irwin Driedger | David Guitard | Bala Glen Farm | 1:38.40 |
| 1984 | Balafran | 3 | Hugo Dittfach | David Guitard | Bala Glen Farm | 1:36.60 |
| 1983 | Cool Tania | 5 | George HoSang | Frank Sansano | T. Pollock/F. & T. Sansano | 1:37.40 |
| 1982 | Frost King | 4 | Lloyd Duffy | Bill Marko | Ted Smith/Bill Marko | 1:37.40 |
| 1981 | Frost King | 3 | Lloyd Duffy | Bill Marko | Ted Smith/B. Marko | 1:40.40 |
| 1980 | Big Bay Point | 4 | Robin Platts | Roger Attfield | Norcliffe Stable | 1:40.40 |
| 1979 | Viceera | 4 | David Clark | Glenn Magnusson | H. & L. Hindmarsh | 1:38.80 |
| 1978 | Speedy Lad | 3 | William McMahon | Danny O'Callaghan | Caledon Heath Farm | 1:34.80 |
| 1977 | Pro Consul | 3 | Ángel Cordero Jr. | Brian Ottaway | Mrs. G. McCullough | 1:39.80 |
| 1976 | Victorian Prince | 6 | Robin Platts | Michael Whittingham | Grovetree/B. C. Stable | 1:40.60 |
| 1975 | Black Hawk Jim | 3 | Sandy Hawley | Donnie Walker | Conn Smythe | 1:37.20 |
