= Lloyd Duffy =

Canadian jockey

Personal information
- Born: December 8, 1944 (age 81) Charlottetown, Prince Edward Island, Canada
- Occupation: Jockey

Horse racing career
- Sport: Horse racing
- Career wins: 2,000+

Major racing wins
- Plate Trial Stakes (1969, 1973, 1981); My Dear Stakes (1969, 1975, 1988); Swynford Stakes (1969, 1988, 1989); Durham Cup Stakes (1969, 1976, 1986); Eclipse Stakes (1972); King Edward Stakes (1972, 1973); Seagram Cup Handicap (1972); Connaught Cup Stakes (1973, 1982, 1987); Display Stakes (1973, 1995); Duchess Stakes (1973, 1987); Jockey Club Cup Handicap (1973, 1982, 1987); Mazarine Stakes (1974); Wonder Where Stakes (1974); Bison City Stakes (1975); Selene Stakes (1975, 1980); Sir Barton Stakes (1975, 1985); Star Shoot Stakes (1975); E. P. Taylor Stakes (1975); Jacques Cartier Stakes (1976, 1982); Nearctic Stakes (1976); Princess Elizabeth Stakes (1976, 1979); Valedictory Stakes (1976, 1978, 1985); Woodstock Stakes (1977); Bull Page Stakes (1979, 1981); Canadian Derby (1979, 1981); Colin Stakes (1979, 1981); La Prevoyante Stakes (1979); Natalma Stakes (1979); Vandal Stakes (1979); Cup and Saucer Stakes (1980); Achievement Stakes (1981); Bunty Lawless Stakes (1981, 1982, 1991); Clarendon Stakes (1981, 1987, 1988); Colonel R. S. McLaughlin Stakes (1981, 1985); Queenston Stakes (1981); Toronto Cup Stakes (1981); Victoria Stakes (1981, 1990); Youthful Stakes (1981); Bold Venture Stakes (1982, 1986); Victoriana Stakes (1982, 1983, 1986); Ontario Matron Stakes (1983); Dominion Day Stakes (1986); Marine Stakes (1986); Grey Stakes (1988); Canadian Stakes (1989); Lady Angela Stakes (1989); Seaway Stakes (1989); Bessarabian Stakes (1994, 1995); Royal North Stakes (1994)

Racing awards
- Sovereign Award for Outstanding Jockey (1982); Avelino Gomez Memorial Award (1990)

Honours
- PEI Sports Hall of Fame (1982)

Significant horses
- Lord Vancouver, Deputy Minister; Frost King, Norcliffe

Lloyd Duffy (born December 8, 1944) is a Canadian retired Champion jockey in Thoroughbred flat horse racing who uniquely is also a licensed driver of harness racing horses.

As a teenager, Duff began attending harness racing events at a racetrack near his home. He left school to go to work for a local stable and eventually made his way to Toronto, Ontario where he was introduced to Thoroughbred racing. Having the physique necessary to be a jockey, he learned to ride and in 1966 obtained his jockey license. While he started his new career slowly, after earning his first win on June 29, 1967, he soon became one of the top apprentice jockeys on the Ontario circuit.

Duffy enjoyed an outstanding career in Canadian racing. Frequently among the top jockeys in wins during the 1970s and 1980s at Greenwood Raceway, and at Woodbine and Fort Erie Racetracks, he also traveled to compete around the world.

Notable among the horses Duffy rode were two Hall of Fame inductees. In 1981 he rode Deputy Minister who was voted the Canadian and American Champion Two-Year-Old Colt as well as Canadian Horse of the Year. The following year he was voted the Sovereign Award for Outstanding Jockey when he was the regular jockey for Canadian Horse of the Year, Frost King.

In 1982, Duffy was inducted in the PEI Sports Hall of Fame and, in 1990, was awarded the Avelino Gomez Memorial Award, an honour given annually to a jockey in Canada who has made significant contributions to the sport.

Retired after thirty years as a jockey, on October 17, 1998, in an event that raised money for charity at the racetrack in his native Charlottetown, Duffy was the celebrity guest jockey who rode in a "man vs horse" match race against sprinter Ben Johnson.

Duffy continues to work in the horse racing industry, exercising horses for various racing stables at Woodbine Racetrack.
