= Victoria Stakes =

- Class: Ungraded Stakes
- Location: Woodbine Racetrack; Toronto, Ontario, Canada
- Inaugurated: 1903
- Race type: Thoroughbred - Flat racing
- Website: www.woodbineentertainment.com/qct/default.asp

Race information
- Distance: 6 furlongs
- Surface: Dirt
- Track: left-handed
- Qualification: Two-year-olds
- Weight: Assigned
- Purse: $96,363 + (2016)

The Victoria Stakes is a thoroughbred horse race run annually at Woodbine Racetrack in Toronto, Ontario, Canada. Held in mid June, it has been raced on Polytrack since 2006 over a distance of five furlongs. In 2015 it was changed to six furlongs. Open to two-year-old horses, it currently offers a purse of $96,363.

Named in honor of Queen Victoria who had died in 1901, the Victoria Stakes was first run in 1903 at the Old Woodbine Racetrack. Following that facility's closure, the race was moved in 1956 to the new Woodbine race track. For 1979 only, it was raced on turf.

Since inception, the Victoria Stakes has been competed over various distances:

- 5 furlongs : 1903–1955
- 5 1/2 furlongs : 1956–1978
- About 5 furlongs : 1979
- 1980 to 2014 : 5 furlongs
- 2015 : 6 furlongs

== Historical notes ==
A number of notable North American horses have won this race including George Smith who won the next year's Kentucky Derby, Belair Stud's colt Faireno in 1931 who was the first horse to break the one-minute barrier and who went on to win the 1932 Belmont Stakes. Notable Canadian-bred winners include Windfields (1945), Nearctic, (1956), Viceregal (1968), and Deputy Minister who in 1981 set a new race record for five furlongs that still stands. In 1982, Sunny's Halo finished second but the following year became only the second Canadian-bred horse to win the Kentucky Derby.

== Records ==
Time record: (at the present distance of 5 furlongs)

- 0:57.20 - Deputy Minister (1981)

Most wins by an owner:

- 5 - Stafford Farms (1960, 1961, 1974, 1975, 1976)

Most wins by a jockey:

- 4 - Avelino Gomez (1956, 1960, 1966, 1967)
- 5 - David Clark (1982, 1988, 2003, 2005, 2011)

Most wins by a trainer:

- 4 - Gil Rowntree (1974, 1975, 1976, 1985)

== Winners ==
Year	Winner	Jockey	Trainer	Owner	Time
2016	Lokinforpursemonee	Gary Boulanger	John A. Ross	J.R. Racing Stable	1:11.17
2015	Hollywood Hideaway	Luis Contreras	Barbara J. Minshall	Bruce Lunsford	1:09.65
2014	Conquest Tsunami	Patrick Husbands	Mark Casse	Conquest Stables	0:57.91
2013	Conquest Whiplash	Eurico da Silva	Mark E. Casse	Conquest Stables	0:58.19
2012	Ray's Away	Chris Griffith	Ricky Griffith	Debmar Stables	0:58.28
2011	Banner Bill	David Clark	Ralph Biamonte	R Plus Partners	0:58.60
2010	Madman Diaries	Jeffrey Sanchez	Wesley A. Ward	Wesley A. Ward	0:58.60
2009	Olredlgetcha	Emile Ramsammy	Greg de Gannes	R Own Stable	0:57.56
2008	Southern Exchange	Jono Jones	Greg de Gannes	Bill & Vicki Poston	0:57.48
2007	Kodiak Kowboy	Emma-Jayne Wilson	Steve Asmussen	Vinery Stables	0:59.44
2006	Chace City	Shaun Bridgmohan	Steve Asmussen	Gold Square LLC	0:59.21
2005	Vibank	David Clark	Josie Carroll	Jim & Alice Sapara	0:59.26
2004	Flamenco	Robert Landry	Todd A. Pletcher	Peachtree Stable	0:57.90
2003	Third Day *	David Clark	Mark Casse	Gaillardia Racing	0:57.86
2002	El Ruller	Ray Sabourin	Arthur Silvera	Larry Spindler et al.	0:58.29
2001	Expected Hour	Patrick Husbands	Mark Casse	Faris, Bolton et al.	0:58.80
2000	Sam Lord's Castle	Emile Ramsammy	Josie Carroll	Eugene Melnyk	0:58.78
1999	Vorticity	Slade Callaghan	Ross Armata	C.E.C. Farms	0:57.67
1998	Erlton	Robert Landry	Benjamin Perkins Jr.	New Farm	0:58.80
1997	Torgan	Todd Kabel	Linda Rice	C. D. Rice	0:59.20
1996	Cash Deposit	Robert Landry	Daniel J. Vella	Frank Stronach	0:59.40
1995	Intrepid Son †	Dave Penna	Roger Attfield	Joe Brocklebank	0:58.80
1995	Gomtuu †	Jerry Baird	Dominic J. Polsinelli	Tri-Colour Racing Stable	0:59.00
1994	Honky Tonk Tune	Robert Landry	Daniel J. Vella	Frank Stronach	0:58.00
1993	Welbred Fred	Dave Penna	Glenn Magnusson	David B. Seyler	0:59.40
1992	Dances With Fire	Don Seymour	Ron Dandy	Wayne Trombly	0:58.20
1991	Alydeed	Don Seymour	Roger Attfield	Kinghaven Farms	0:59.40
1990	Megas Vukefalos	Lloyd Duffy	Daniel J. Vella	Knob Hill Stable	0:59.60
1989	Wavering Girl	Sandy Hawley	Michael J. Doyle	Windhaven	0:58.80
1988	Chill Up	David Clark	Gordon Huntley	V&O Stable/Kitchen	0:59.00
1987	Dapple Dancer	Dan Beckon	Grant Pearce	King Caledon Farm	0:59.40
1986	Fozzie Bear	Robin Platts	Tino Attard	V.C.L. Farms/Spatafora	0:58.00
1985	Dom Dancer	Dan Beckon	Gil Rowntree	B. K. Y. Stable	0:58.60
1984	Honey's Answer	Gary Stahlbaum	G. Hughes	Comra	0:59.00
1983	Archregent	Hugo Dittfach	Arthur H. Warner	Richard R. Kennedy	0:59.80
1982	Flying Pocket	David Clark	Tony Mattine	The Three Of Us Stable	0:58.20
1981	Deputy Minister	Lloyd Duffy	Bill Marko	Centurion Farms	0:57.20
1980	Solo Guy	George HoSang	Laurie Silvera	Gordon F. Hall	0:59.40
1979	Classic Joker	George HoSang	Brian Ottaway	Mrs. G. McCullagh	0:59.80
1978	Highland Ridge	Sandy Hawley	John J. Tammaro Jr.	Kinghaven Farms	1:05.20
1977	Lucky Colonel S.	Gary Stahlbaum	Donnie Walker	Conn Smythe	1:04.80
1976	Sound Reason	Robin Platts	Gil Rowntree	Stafford Farms	1:06.20
1975	Proud Tobin	Jeffrey Fell	Gil Rowntree	Stafford Farms	1:06.00
1974	Royal Selari	Robin Platts	Gil Rowntree	Stafford Farms	1:05.20
1973	Backstretch	Noel Turcotte	Carl F. Chapman	O'Maonaign Abu Stable	1:06.20
1972	Down North	John LeBlanc	James C. Bentley	Helen G. Stollery	1:06.00
1971	Gentleman Conn	John Baboolal	Jerry C. Meyer	Willow Downs Farm	1:05.40
1970	Briartic	Richard Grubb	J. Mort Hardy	Bennett Farms	1:04.80
1969	Artic Feather	Chris Rogers	R. Boucher	Aylmer Stable	1:06.00
1968	Viceregal	Richard Grubb	Gordon J. McCann	Windfields Farm	1:04.40
1967	Real Sensible	Avelino Gomez	Jerry C. Meyer	Willow Downs Farm	1:04.60
1966	Ring Francis	Avelino Gomez	Lou Cavalaris Jr.	Gardiner Farm	1:04.40
1965	Stevie B. Good	Nick Shuk	Jerry C. Meyer	E. C. Pasquale	1:05.80
1964	Bright Object	James Fitzsimmons	Lou Cavalaris Jr.	Gardiner Farm	1:05.00
1963	Ramblin Road	Pat Remillard	Gordon M. Huntley	Gordon F. Hall	1:04.40
1962	Hail Dipper	Charles McKee	J. Mack	W. P. Mack	1:04.40
1961	Royal Spirit	Al Coy	John Passero	Stafford Farms	1:06.20
1960	Fair Charger	Avelino Gomez	E. Odorico	Stafford Farms	1:05.00
1959	Bulpamiru	Cliff Potts	Red Barnard	Shermanor Farm	1:04.80
1958	Le Grand Rouge	R. Gonzalez	Yonnie Starr	Larkin Maloney & Conn Smythe	1:04.80
1957	Silver Ship	Ernie Warme	Gordon M. Huntley	Gordon F. Hall	1:05.20
1956	Nearctic	Avelino Gomez	Gordon J. McCann	E. P. Taylor	1:06.60
1955	Bunty's Flight	George Walker	Yonnie Starr	Larkin Maloney	1:00.00
1954	Benroman	Gene Pederson	James C. Bentley	B. R. Steen	0:59.60
1953	Collisteo	Bert Albert	S. Couch	Bur-Fit Stable	0:58.60
1952	War General	Bobby Watson	L. Silvestri	C. L. Taylor	1:00.00
1951	French Lace	Alf Bavington	John Passero	William R. Beasley	1:00.20
1950	Acceptable	Chris Rogers	Frank Merrill Jr.	Halton Brook Stable	1:00.00
1949	Petrolas	A. Montiro	F. Fitzgerald	Jolly Roger Stable	0:59.60
1948	Avona	Howard Bailey	James C. Bentley	Addison Stable	0:59.60
1947	Tonado	Bobby Watson	J. Grills	F. W. Ellins	1:00.60
1946	Imperator	Johnny Dewhurst	Arthur Brent	Parkwood Stable	1:01.00
1945	Windfields	Herb Black	Bert Alexandra	Cosgrave Stable	0:59.00
1944	Transbest	Chris Rogers	Loyd Gentry Sr.	Four Oaks Stable	1:01.20
1943	Airpan	C. W. Smythe	Reggie Cornell	F. Ellins	1:00.40
1942	Sweepnack	David Prater	Octave Viau	Harry C. Hatch	1:03.40
1941	Air Sure	Harry Meynell	M. Nichols	Conn Smythe	1:00.80
1940	Ariel Trip	Herb Lindberg	W. Coburn	Conn Smythe	1:02.80
1939	King's Colors	Albert Schmidt	Frank Gilpin	Parkwood Stable	1:01.60
1938	Hope Diamond	Pat Remillard	H. Chappell	C. N. Mooney	1:01.80
1937	no race				
1936	Miss Dolphin	J. Hunter	John J. Thorpe	Edward F. Seagram	1:01.20
1935	Santan	Herb Lindberg	John J. Thorpe	Edward F. Seagram	0:59.80
1934	Ouragan	C. McDonald	Harry Giddings, Jr.	Col. R. S. McLaughlin	1:00.20
1933	Polly Egret	John Mattioli	Jack Whyte	Fairfields Farm	1:00.40
1932	Miss Puray	J. G. Petz	William M. Garth	Tranquility Farm	1:01.60
1931	Faireno	Anthony Pascuma	George Tappen	Belair Stud	0:59.60
1930	Totem	Raymond Workman	James G. Rowe Jr.	Harry Payne Whitney	1:00.60
1929	Snowy	Louis Schaefer	Thomas J. Healey	Walter J. Salmon Sr.	1:01.60
1928	Rapid Transit	Raymond G. Peternell	Preston M. Burch	Kilrain Stable	1:01.00
1927	Reprove	Francis Horn	Owen E. Pons	W. Maher	1:01.60
1926	Jopagan	Charles Fairbrother	R. Mitchell	A. G. Weston	1:03.20
1925	Gaffsman	B. Kennedy	William H. Bringloe	Seagram Stable	1:01.40
1924	Gymkhana	Edward Scobie	William Irvine	Edward F. Whitney	1:01.40
1923	Idle Thoughts	A. Roach	J. Wagnon	M. J. Reid	1:01.80
1922	Bucado	John McTaggart	M. Kelley	B. Harding	1:00.60
1921	Second Thoughts	Thomas Parrington	William Irvine	Edward F. Whitney	1:01.00
1920	Baby Grand	Earl Sande	Fred H. Schelke	J. K. L. Ross	1:02.00
1919	no race				
1918	no race				
1917	Charlie Leydecker	Thomas Parrington	W. Livingston	Ed McBride	1:02.40
1916	Manokin	W. Ward	H. Guy Bedwell	H. Guy Bedwell	1:02.40
1915	George Smith	Guy Burns	T. Shannan	Ed McBride	1:01.40
1914	Sid Edgar	Edward Taplin	H. Guy Bedwell	H. Guy Bedwell	1:01.00
1913	Southern Maid	P. Moody	John Nixon	Robert T. Davies	1:00.80
1912	Monocacy	James Butwell	Albert Simons	Harry Payne Whitney	1:02.00
1911	Moisant	Guy Burns	Albert Simons	Albert Simons	1:01.60
1910	Moncrief	Harty	Henry McDaniel	R. L. Thomas	1:02.60
1909	Turf Star	Mentry	John W. May	John W. May	1:01.80
1908	Simcoe	Edward Walsh	G. Graydon	J. H. Madigan	1:02.60
1907	Johnny Blake	David Nicol	W. Phillips	F. Cook	1:00.60
1906	Arimo	J. Foley	E. Landsberg	J. J. Welsh	1:01.00
1905	St. Joseph	W. Daly	Michael J. Daly	Michael J. Daly	1:05.75
1904	Shannonside	Otto Wonderly	Barry T. Littlefield	Joseph E. Seagram	1:02.75
1903	Spring	D. Murray	Albert G. Weston	Goughacres Stable (Thomas G. Clyde)	1:04.75

- * In 2003, Gemini Dream won but was disqualified and placed last for interference.
- † Run in two divisions in 1995.
