= Slade Callaghan =

Barbadian jockey

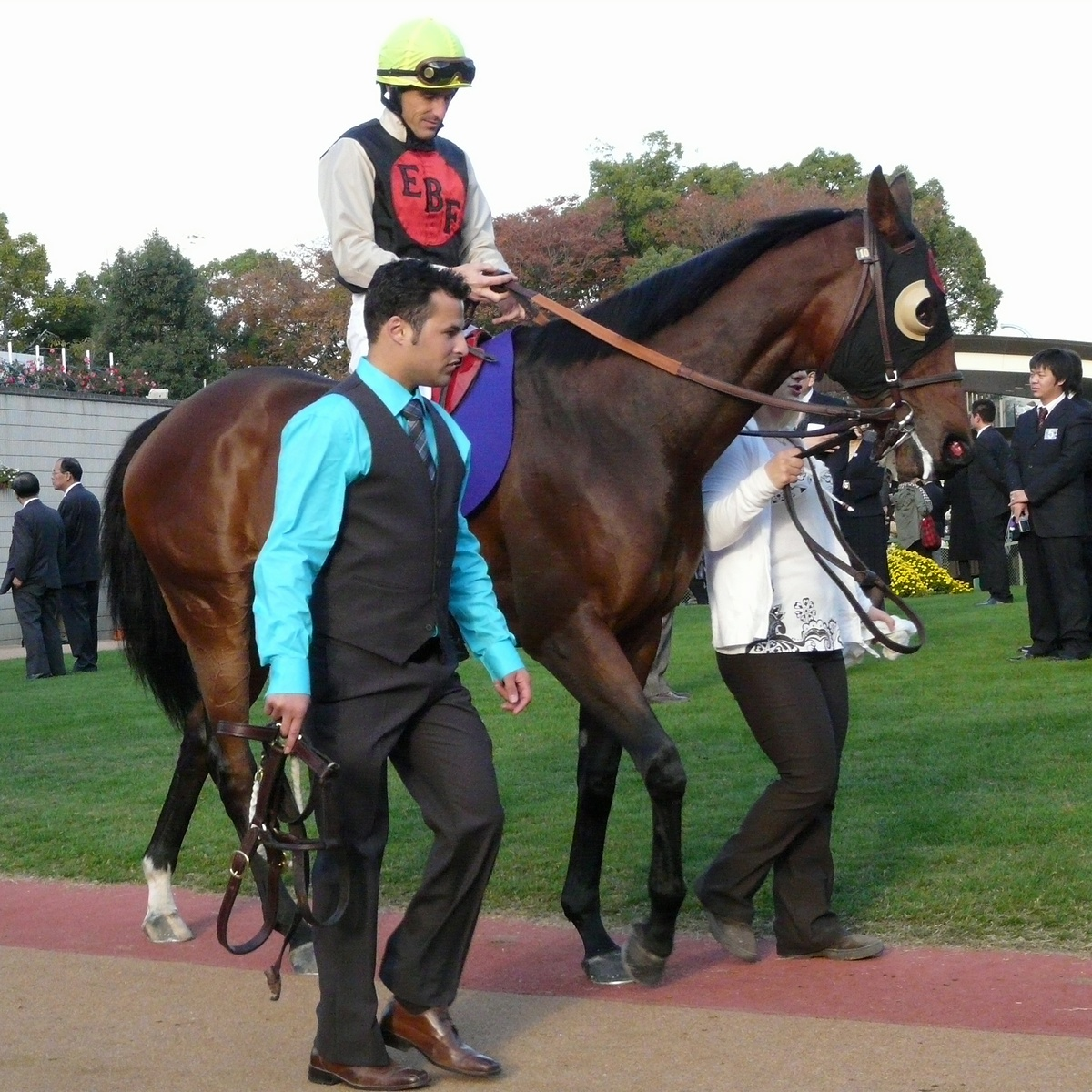
- Slade Callaghan and his Horse preparing to race.

Personal information
- Born: August 21, 1970 (age 55) Bridgetown, Barbados
- Occupation: Jockey

Horse racing career
- Sport: Horse racing
- Career wins: 580+ (ongoing)

Major racing wins
- Barbados Derby Trial Stakes (1990); Colin Stakes (1996, 1999); Bunty Lawless Stakes (1999); Connaught Cup Stakes (1999); Kennedy Road Stakes (1999); Victoria Stakes (1999); Victoria Park Stakes (1999); King Edward Stakes (2000, 2009); New Providence Stakes (2000); Sir Barton Stakes (2000); Wonder Where Stakes (2000); Cup and Saucer Stakes (2001, 2005); Shepperton Stakes (2001); Toronto Cup Stakes (2002); Bison City Stakes (2003); Barbados Gold Cup (2004); Sky Classic Stakes (2004); Frost King Stakes (2005); South Ocean Stakes (2005); Connaught Cup Stakes (2008); Vice Regent Stakes (2008); Woodbine Mile (2008) Canadian Classic Race wins: Breeders' Stakes (2002)

Significant horses
- Incitatus, Portcullis, Rahy's Attorney

Slade Callaghan (born August 21, 1970, in Bridgetown, Barbados) is a jockey in Thoroughbred horse racing.

Considered tall for a jockey at 5' 8", Callaghan competed in his native Barbados where his success led him to relocate in 1994 to a base at Woodbine Racetrack in Toronto, Ontario, Canada.

Among his victories, Callaghan captured the 2002 Breeders' Stakes, a Canadian Classic Race. In 2004 he traveled to his homeland where he won the country's most prestigious race, the Barbados Gold Cup.

== Year-end charts ==
Chart (2000–present)	Peak position
National Earnings List for Jockeys 2000	93
National Earnings List for Jockeys 2002	74
National Earnings List for Jockeys 2004	60
