= Connaught Cup Stakes =

Horse race in Ontario, Canada

- Class: Grade II
- Location: Woodbine Racetrack; Toronto, Ontario, Canada
- Inaugurated: 1912
- Race type: Thoroughbred - Flat racing
- Website: woodbine.com

Race information
- Distance: 7 1/2 furlongs
- Surface: Turf
- Track: Left-handed
- Qualification: Four-Year-Olds & Up
- Weight: Allowances
- Purse: $200,000 (2026)

The Connaught Cup Stakes is a Thoroughbred horse race run annually at Woodbine Racetrack in Toronto, Ontario, Canada. Run in late May, the Grade II race is open to horses aged four and older. Raced over a distance of seven furlongs on turf, it currently offers a purse of $196,750.

The Connaught Cup was first run in 1912 on dirt at Toronto's Old Woodbine Race Course. As a result of World War I, there was no race held in 1918 and 1919 and it was not run in 1930. The Great Depression saw much consolidation in the horse racing industry with track owners reducing the number of races run and the amount of the purses being offered. The Connaught Cup was suspended after the 1932 running and was not revived until 1952. In 1956 it was moved to the newly built Woodbine Racetrack where in 1958 it was converted to a turf race.

It was run in two divisions in 1984.

Since inception, the race has been contested at various distances:
On dirt:

- 1 1/16 miles : 1912 through 1955 at Old Woodbine Race Course, 1956-1957 at Woodbine Racecourse

On turf:

- 7 furlongs : 2010-2025 at Woodbine Racetrack
- 7 1/2 furlongs: beginning in 2026 at Woodbine Racetrack
- 1 mile : 1994 at Fort Erie Racetrack
- 1 1/16 miles : 1958-1963, 1980–93, 1995-2009 at Woodbine Racetrack
- 1 1/8 miles : 1964-1966, 1979 at Woodbine Racetrack, 1967-1978 at Fort Erie Racetrack

== Records ==
Speed record:

- 1:19.40 - Tower of Texas (2017) (7 furlongs)
- 1:28.64 - G T Five Hundred (2026) (7 1/2 furlongs)

Most wins:

- 2 - Plate Glass (1912, 1913)
- 2 - King Maple (1955, 1956)
- 2 - E. Day (1964, 1965)
- 2 - James Bay (1968, 1969)
- 2 - Bridle Path (1981, 1984)
- 2 - Kiridashi (1997, 1998)
- 2 - Something Extra (2012, 2013)
- 2 - Cruden Bay (2024, 2025)

Most wins by an owner:

- 5 - J. K. L. Ross (1916, 1920, 1922, 1924, 1927)
- 5 - Stafford Farms (1975, 1976, 1978, 1979, 1980)

Most wins by a jockey:

- 8 - Robin Platts (1968, 1969, 1975, 1976, 1978, 1979, 1988, 1992)

Most wins by a trainer:

- 5 - Gil Rowntree (1975, 1976, 1978, 1979, 1980)

== Winners ==
Year	Winner	Age	Jockey	Trainer	Owner	Time
2026	G T Five Hundred	6	Jose Luis Campos	Dale A. Desruisseaux	Centennial Farms (Niagara)	1:28.64
2025	Cruden Bay	7	Fraser Aebly	Donald C. MacRae	Michael Lay	1:21.98
2024	Cruden Bay	6	Sofia Vives	Donald C. MacRae	Michael Lay	1:21.27
2023	Dream Shake	5	Rafael Hernandez	Michael Stidham	Exline-Border Racing LLC, Eurton, Hausman & Stonestreet Stables LLC	1:20.33
2022	Filo Di Arianna	6	Luis Contreras	Mark Casse	Gary Barber, Wachtel Stable & Peter Deutsch	1:20.36
2021	Avie's Flatter	5	Luis Contreras	Josie Carroll	Ivan Dalos	1:20.99
2020	Silent Poet	5	Justin Stein	Nicholas Gonzalez	Stronach Stables	1:23.62
2019	El Tormenta	4	Luis Contreras	Gail Cox	Sam-Son Farm	1:20.29
2018	Caribou Club	4	Gary Boulanger	Thomas F. Proctor	Glen Hill Farm	1:20.22
2017	Tower of Texas	6	Eurico Rosa Da Silva	Roger Attfield	Thomas F. Van Meter II & Scott Dilworth	1:19.40
2016	Dimension (GB)	8	David Moran	Conor Murphy	Riverside Bloodstock	1:21.84
2015	Lockout	6	Gary Boulanger	Mark Casse	John Oxley	1:22.64
2014	Excaper	5	Justin Stein	Ian Black	Richard S. Kaster & Frederick C. Wieting	1:19.53
2013	Something Extra	5	Eurico Rosa Da Silva	Gail Cox	John Menary & Gail Cox	1:20.54
2012	Something Extra	4	Eurico Rosa Da Silva	Gail Cox	John Menary & Gail Cox	1:20.69
2011	Stormy Lord	4	Jim McAleney	Ian Black	Hat Trick Stable/Kinghaven Farms	1:25.72
2010	Grand Adventure	4	Patrick Husbands	Mark Frostad	Sam-Son Farms	1:19.83
2009	Sterwins	3	Patrick Husbands	Malcolm Pierce	Melnyk Racing Stables	1:38.99
2008	Rahy's Attorney	4	Slade Callaghan	Ian Black	Ellie-Boje Farm	1:39.53
2007	Eccentric	6	David Clark	Roger Attfield	Gary A. Tanaka	1:45.05
2006	Remarkable News	4	Javier Castellano	Angel Penna Jr.	Holly Rincon	1:39.67
2005	Le Cinquieme Essai	6	Steven Bahen	Paul Nielsen	William J. Scott	1:40.79
2004	Slew Valley	7	Jim McAleney	Reade Baker	Rich Meadow Farm (W. James Hindman)	1:40.24
2002	Quiet Resolve	7	Todd Kabel	Mark Frostad	Sam-Son Farm	1:40.88
2001	Red Sea	5	Emile Ramsammy	Roger Attfield	Prince Fahd Salman	1:47.49
2001	Del Mar Show	4	Robbie Davis	William I. Mott	Allen E. Paulson Trust	1:48.17
2000	Super Red	4	Emile Ramsammy	Malcolm Pierce	Stronach Stables	1:43.78
1999	Incitatus	6	Slade Callaghan	Ronald Burke	John Kom-Tong	1:40.57
1998	Kiridashi	6	Todd Kabel	Barbara J. Minshall	Minshall Farms	1:39.80
1997	Kiridashi	5	Mickey Walls	Barbara J. Minshall	Minshall Farms	1:40.00
1996	Lahint	5	Todd Kabel	Kathy Patton-Casse	Harry T. Mangurian, Jr.	1:40.20
1995	Jet Freighter	4	Todd Kabel	Tony Mattine	Fishman/Peter/Yu	1:39.20
1994	Shiny Key	6	Mark Larsen	Alton Quanbeck	D. Morgan Firestone	1:35.00
1993	Rainbows For Life	5	Jack Lauzon	James E. Day	Pin Oak/Sam-Son	1:43.40
1992	Cozzene's Prince	5	Robin Platts	Tino Attard	Kirby Canada Farm	1:42.60
1991	Sky Classic	4	Pat Day	James E. Day	Sam-Son Farm	1:41.20
1990	With Approval	4	Don Seymour	Roger Attfield	Kinghaven Farms	1:41.60
1989	Granacus	4	Kent Desormeaux	Pat Collins	Knob Hill Stable	1:46.20
1988	Grey Classic	5	Robin Platts	James E. Day	Sam-Son Farm	1:44.00
1987	Boulder Run	4	Lloyd Duffy	Jerry G. Lavigne	R. Doe & B. Hutzel	1:45.20
1986	Corseque	5	Robert King, Jr.	David MacLean	Norcliffe Stables	1:43.40
1985	Mascot	4	Dave Penna	Alton Quanbeck	Maud McDougald	1:44.40
1984	George Dinkle	4	George HoSang	Laurie Silvera	Silverbrook Stable	1:44.20
1984	Bridle Path	8	David Clark	Macdonald Benson	Windfields Farm	1:43.40
1983	Fiddle Dancer Boy	5	David Clark	James C. Bentley	John B. W. Carmichael	1:46.00
1982	Frost King	4	Lloyd Duffy	Bill Marko	Ted Smith/Bill Marko	1:48.00
1981	Bridle Path	5	J. Paul Souter	Macdonald Benson	Windfields Farm	1:42.60
1980	Great State	4	Jim Fazio	Gil Rowntree	Stafford Farms	1:42.00
1979	Bruce South	4	Robin Platts	Gil Rowntree	Stafford Farms	1:49.40
1978	Sound Reason *	4	Robin Platts	Gil Rowntree	Stafford Farms	1:50.80
1977	Reasonable Win	5	John LeBlanc	Fred H. Loschke	Hammer Kopf Farm	1:51.40
1976	Royal Chocolate	6	Robin Platts	Gil Rowntree	Stafford Farms	1:50.40
1975	Amber Herod	4	Robin Platts	Gil Rowntree	Stafford Farms	1:50.20
1974	Fabe Count	6	Sandy Hawley	Jerry G. Lavigne	Parkview Stable	1:48.80
1973	Suffix	4	Lloyd Duffy	Glenn Magnusson	Aubrey W. Minshall	1:50.20
1972	Briartic	4	Brian Swatuk	Andrew G. Smithers	Bennett Farms	1:48.60
1971	Yukon Eric	5	Sandy Hawley	Lou Cavalaris, Jr.	Gardiner Farm	1:49.00
1970	Son Costume	5	R. Armstrong	W. H. Moorhead	Paison Stable	1:50.00
1969	James Bay	5	Robin Platts	Lou Cavalaris, Jr.	Gardiner Farm	1:51.00
1968	James Bay	4	Robin Platts	Lou Cavalaris, Jr.	Gardiner Farm	1:49.00
1967	Stevie B. Good	4	Richard Grubb	B. Puccini	E. C. Pasquale	1:48.40
1966	Victorian Era	4	Avelino Gomez	Lou Cavalaris, Jr.	A. Case	1:50.80
1965	E. Day	5	Pat Remillard	Hume E. M. Pollock	Hume E. M. Pollock	1:50.80
1964	E. Day	4	Pat Remillard	Hume E. M. Pollock	Hume E. M. Pollock	1:51.00
1963	Roman Banquet	3	George Gubbins	S. U. Ross	E. C. Pasquale	1:44.60
1962	Axeman	4	Hugo Dittfach	Richard Townrow	Lanson Farms	1:48.80
1961	Hidden Treasure	4	Pat Remillard	Robert S. Bateman	William R. Beasley	1:43.20
1960	Winning Shot	4	Avelino Gomez	Willie Thurner	J. S. Evans	1:43.80
1959	White Apache	4	Don Hale	F. Russell	Four L's Stable	1:43.80
1958	West Four	4	Al Coy	S. Caplan	C. Bordonaro	1:47.60
1957	Censor	4	Avelino Gomez	Gordon J. McCann	Winnifred Taylor	1:45.00
1956	King Maple	5	C. Brown	John Hornsby	McMacken Stable	1:44.80
1955	King Maple	4	Herb Lindberg	John Hornsby	McMacken Stable	1:44.40
1954	Chain Reaction	4	William Zakoor	Richard Townrow	Elodie S. Tomlinson	1:45.00
1953	Visible	4	Emile Roy	F. Robinson	E. Elman	1:47.00
1933	1952	Race not held				
1932	Khorasan	4	Eddie Legere	William H. Bringloe	Seagram Stables	1:46.40
1931	Marine	5	Frankie Mann	Harry Giddings, Jr.	Mount Royal Stable (Kenneth T. Dawes et al)	1:45.80
1930	Race not held					
1929	Young Kitty	4	John Maiben	William H. Bringloe	Seagram Stables	1:49.20
1928	Clear Sky	4	T. Burns	G. Alexandra	J. E. Smallman	1:49.60
1927	Lactarius	4	R. Fisher	Fred H. Schelke	J. K. L. Ross	1:49.80
1926	Goldbeater	4	John Maiben	James Boden	Donat Raymond	1:47.20
1925	King's Court	6	B. Kennedy	William H. Bringloe	Seagram Stables	1:49.20
1924	Deep Thought	3	Edward Scobie	Henry McDaniel	J. K. L. Ross	1:46.40
1923	James F. O'Hara	5	Whitey Abel	Jack D. Adkins	Kirkfield Stable	1:45.40
1922	Baby Grand	4	Clarence Turner	Henry McDaniel	J. K. L. Ross	1:49.60
1921	Lucky B.	6	Harold Thurber	G. Hennessy	G. Macfarlane	1:47.60
1920	Boniface	5	Earl Sande	Fred H. Schelke	J. K. L. Ross	1:48.60
1918	1919	Race not held				
1917	Smart Money	3	Lee Mink	E. Trotte	R. E. Millett	1:48.60
1916	Uncle Bryn	4	Linus McAtee	W. Fred Presgrave	J. K. L. Ross	1:47.20
1915	Privet Petal	4	James Smyth	Ed Whyte	John S. Hendrie	1:47.40
1914	Calgary	4	Albert Claver	Henry McDaniel	Robert T. Davies	1:47.20
1913	Plate Glass	7	Willie Knapp	John Nixon	Robert T. Davies	1:47.00
1912	Plate Glass	6	E. Martin	C. Patterson	Robert T. Davies	1:48.40

*In 1978, Hopeful Answer finished first but was disqualified and set back to second.

== See also ==
- List of Canadian flat horse races
