= Sky Classic Stakes =

- Class: Grade II
- Location: Woodbine Racetrack; Toronto, Ontario, Canada
- Inaugurated: 1902
- Race type: Thoroughbred - Flat racing
- Website: Woodbine Racetrack

Race information
- Distance: 1 1/4 miles (10 furlongs)
- Surface: Turf
- Track: Left-handed
- Qualification: Three-year-olds & Up
- Weight: Assigned
- Purse: Can$200,000 (since 2013)

The Sky Classic Stakes is a Grade II Thoroughbred horse race run annually at Woodbine Racetrack in Toronto, Ontario, Canada. Raced in mid to late August on turf over a distance of 1 1/4 miles (10 furlongs), it is open to horses three years of age and older. In recent years it has become a major prep race for local horses looking to go on to run against the best horses from around the world in Woodbine's $2 million Canadian International.

Renamed in 1995 to honour Canadian Horse Racing Hall of Fame inductee, Sky Classic, the race was first run at the Old Woodbine Racetrack in 1902 as the Jockey Club Cup Handicap. It was raced on dirt from inception until 1956 but became a turf race the following year when moved to the new Woodbine racing facility. Over the years, it has been run at various distances:

On dirt:

- 1902–1903 : 2 miles
- 1904–1905 : 2 1/16 miles
- 1906–1926 : 2 1/4 miles
- 1927–1931 : 1 1/2 miles
- 1936–1951 : 1 1/8 miles
- 1952–1956 : 1 1/4 miles

On turf:

- 1957–1989 : 1 1/4 miles
- 1990–1994 : 1 1/8 miles
- 1995 : 1 mile
- 1996 : 1 1/16 miles
- 1997–2009 : 1 3/8 miles
- 2010–2016 : 1 1/4 miles
- 2017–present : 1 3/8 miles

== Records ==
Time record:

- 2:00.12 - Forte Dei Marmi (2013) (at 1 1/4 miles on turf)
- 2:13.05 - Dawson's Legacy (1999) (at 1 3/8 miles on turf)

Most wins:

- 2 - Sotemia (1911, 1912)
- 2 - Harrovian (1924, 1925)
- 2 - Carney's Point (1974, 1975)
- 2 - Chief Bearhart (1997, 1998)
- 2 - Forte Dei Marmi (GB) (2012, 2013)

Most wins by an owner:

- 5 - Sam-Son Farm (1991, 1997, 1998, 2002, 2004)

Most wins by a jockey:

- 4 - Robin Platts (1974, 1975, 1980, 1981)

Most wins by a trainer:

- 4 - Lou Cavalaris, Jr. (1966, 1974, 1975, 1990)

== Winners of the Sky Classic Stakes since 1969 ==
Year	Winner	Age	Jockey	Trainer	Owner	Time
2018	Utmost	4	Alan Garcia	H. Graham Motion	Augustin Stable	2:17.61
2017	Can'thelpbelieving (IRE)	6	Joe Bravo	H. Graham Motion	Albert Frassetto	2:14.95
2016	Messi (GER)	6	Edgar Prado	H. Graham Motion	Gestut Brummerhof	2:00.89
2015	Interpol	4	Emma-Jayne Wilson	Sid C. Attard	JMJ Racing Stables	2:01.05
2014	Karibu Gardens	4	Luis Contreras	Josie Carroll	Melnyk Racing Stables	2:02.46
2013	Forte Dei Marmi (GB)	7	Eurico Rosa Da Silva	Roger L. Attfield	Stella Perdomo	2:00.12
2012	Forte Dei Marmi (GB)	6	Alex Solis	Roger L. Attfield	Stella Perdomo	2:02.57
2011	Kara Orientation	4	Emile Ramsammy	Steven Chircop	Berketa/Pinnacle Racing	2:04.87
2010	Marsh Side	7	Edgar Prado	Neil Drysdale	Robert S. Evans	2:08.99
2009	Marchfield	5	Patrick Husbands	Mark E. Casse	Melnyk Racing Stables	2:16.56
2008	Lauro	5	Tyler Pizarro	Andreas Woehler	Gestut Ittlingen	2:18.81
2007	Cloudy's Knight	7	Ramsey Zimmerman	Frank J. Kirby	S J Stables LLC	2:14.10
2006	Better Talk Now	7	Ramon Dominguez	H. Graham Motion	Bushwood Stables	2:18.50
2005	A Bit O'Gold	4	Jono Jones	Catherine Day Phillips	Two Bit Racing Stable	2:17.17
2004	Colorful Judgement	4	Slade Callaghan	Mark Frostad	Sam-Son Farm	2:16.19
2003	Bowman Mill	5	Brice Blanc	Michael W. Dickinson	Dr. John A. Chandler	2:23.14
2002	Strut The Stage	4	Todd Kabel	Mark Frostad	Sam-Son Farm	2:19.33
2001	Stage Classic	3	Constant Montpellier	David Cotey	Dominion Bloodstock et al.	2:21.79
2000	Muntej	3	Robert Landry	Roger Attfield	David McLaughlin et al.	2:18.83
1999	Dawson's Legacy	4	Constant Montpellier	Norman McKnight, Jr.	J. M. Stritzl Stable	2:13.05
1998	Chief Bearhart	5	José A. Santos	Mark Frostad	Sam-Son Farm	2:15.60
1997	Chief Bearhart	4	José A. Santos	Mark Frostad	Sam-Son Farm	2:13.40
1996	Lassigny	5	Julie Krone	William I. Mott	Prince Sultan Al Kabeer	2:18.00
1995	Jet Freighter	4	Todd Kabel	Tony Mattine	Uri Fishman / Peter Yu	2:13.40
1994	Shiny Key	6	David Clark	Alton H. Quanbeck	D. Morgan Firestone	1:47.60
1994	Ride With Pancho	4	Sandy Hawley	Robert Tiller	G. J. Meyers	1:47.40
1993	Hero's Love	5	Earlie Fires	Danny Vella	Frank Stronach	1:45.60
1992	Thunder Regent	5	Sandy Hawley	Vince Tesoro	D. D. W. Stables	1:46.60
1991	Tot of Rum	5	Daniel J. David	James E. Day	Sam-Son Farm	1:46.60
1990	Asturiano	5	Dave Penna	Lou Cavalaris, Jr.	Gardiner Farms	1:46.80
1989	Steady Power	5	Jim McAleney	Roger Attfield	Kinghaven Farms	2:00.20
1988	Gallant Mel	3	Jack Lauzon	D. Campbell	Michael Penhale	2:06.00
1987	Boulder Run	4	Lloyd Duffy	Jerry Lavigne	R. Doe / B. Hutzel	2:02.40
1986	Wild Style	4	Richard Dos Ramos	Richard Attfield	Kinghaven Farms	2:05.60
1985	Nagurski	4	George HoSang	Michael Doyle	Dogwood Stable	2:11.40
1984	Cost Control	5	Jeffrey Fell	Neal Winick	Serge Fradkoff	2:02.40
1983	Nijinsky's Secret	5	Jose A. Velez, Jr.	Kent Stirling	Mrs. J. A. McDougald	2:02.20
1982	Frost King	4	Lloyd Duffy	Bill Marko	Ted Smith & Bill Marko	2:08.20
1981	Irish Heart	3	Robin Platts	Gil Rowntree	B.K.Y. Stable	2:06.00
1980	Overskate	5	Robin Platts	Gil Rowntree	Stafford Farms	2:07.00
1979	Friuli	6	Fernando Toro	Tony Mattine	G. Caroli	2:10.40
1978	Meticulous Robert	4	Don MacBeth	John J. Tammaro Jr.	Kinghaven Farms	2:09.80
1977	Paddock Park	4	J. Walford	R. MacKinnon	Espo Racing Stable	2:18.00
1976	Tiny Tinker	3	Avelino Gomez	George "Jake" Nemett	William Beasley	2:03.60
1975	Carney's Point	6	Robin Platts	Lou Cavalaris, Jr.	Gardiner Farm	2:06.40
1974	Carney's Point	5	Robin Platts	Lou Cavalaris, Jr.	Gardiner Farm	2:03.00
1973	Fabe Count	5	Lloyd Duffy	Jerry Lavigne	Parkview Stable	2:02.40
1972	Gallant Glen	4	Sandy Hawley	James C. Bentley	Helen Stollery	2:04.60
1971	Speedy Zephyr	3	Herberto Hinojosa	Les Lear	C. Rathgeb	2:02.20
1970	Dance Act	4	R. Armstrong	L. Grant	Green Hills Farm	2:07.00
1969	Tradesman	5	Avelino Gomez	R. Potter	M. Ross	2:03.80

*Run in two divisions in 1994.

== Earlier winners ==
- 1968 - Petit Duc
- 1967 - Pretko
- 1966 - Orbiter
- 1965 - Quick Pitch
- 1964 - Greek Form
- 1963 - Mr. Sometime *
- 1963 - Bronze Babu *
- 1962 - El Bandito
- 1961 - Prompt Hero
- 1960 - Merry Top II
- 1959 - Sailor's Guide
- 1958 - Grey Monarch
- 1957 - Kitty Girl
- 1956 - Ballydonnell
- 1955 - Hickory Hill
- 1954 - Unbranded
- 1953 - Risque Rouge
- 1952 - Freedom Wins
- 1951 - Harahome
- 1950 - Beau Dandy
- 1949 - Double Briar
- 1948 - Yellowknife
- 1947 - Vice Admiral
- 1946 - Ferry Pilot
- 1945 - Westport Point
- 1944 - Bon Jour
- 1943 - Teeworth
- 1941 - No race
- 1942 - No race
- 1940 - High Honors
- 1939 - Filisteo
- 1938 - Sun Power
- 1937 - Teddy Haslam
- 1936 - Temptestuous
- 1932 - No race
- 1933 - No race
- 1934 - No race
- 1935 - No race
- 1931 - Khorasan
- 1930 - Yarn
- 1929 - Frisius
- 1928 - Sir Harry
- 1927 - Display
- 1926 - Harrovian
- 1925 - Harrovian
- 1924 - Horologe
- 1923 - My Dear
- 1922 - Parisian Diamond
- 1921 - Louis
- 1920 - Exterminator
- 1917 - No race
- 1918 - No race
- 1919 - No race
- 1916 - Fair Mac
- 1915 - Rancher
- 1914 - Great Britain
- 1913 - Airey
- 1912 - Sotemia
- 1911 - Sotemia
- 1910 - Duke of Roanoke
- 1909 - Azo
- 1908 - Cave Adsum
- 1907 - Kelpie
- 1906 - Alma Dufour
- 1905 - War Whoop
- 1904 - Persistence II
- 1903 - Wire In
- 1902 - Orontas
*In 1963 there was a dead heat for first.

== See also ==
- List of Canadian flat horse races
