= Frost King Stakes =

- Class: Restricted Stakes
- Location: Woodbine Racetrack; Toronto, Ontario
- Inaugurated: 1997
- Race type: Thoroughbred - Flat racing
- Website: www.woodbineentertainment.com

Race information
- Distance: Seven furlong sprint
- Surface: Polytrack
- Track: left-handed
- Qualification: Two-year-olds (Ontario Sire Stakes program)
- Weight: Allowances
- Purse: $97,900

The Frost King Stakes is a Thoroughbred horse race run annually in mid November at Woodbine Racetrack in Toronto, Ontario, Canada. An Ontario Sire Stakes, it is a restricted race for two-year-olds and is raced over a distance of seven furlongs on the Tapeta synthetic surface. It currently carries a purse of $97,900.

The race was named in honor of Frost King, the 1982 Canadian Horse of the Year and a Canadian Horse Racing Hall of Fame inductee.

== Records ==
Speed record: (Through 1998, times were recorded in fifths of a second. Since 1999 they are in hundredths of a second)

- 1:23.09 - Stuck In Traffic (2007) (on Polytrack)
- 1:24.20 - Eastern Answer (on dirt)

Most wins by an owner:

- 2 - Ralph Lococo & Mary Biamonte (2011, 2013)

Most wins by a jockey:

- 3 - Patrick Husbands (2011, 2012, 2013)
- 2 - Richard Dos Ramos (1997, 2002)
- 2 - Todd Kabel (1999, 2004)

Most wins by a trainer:

- 2 - Ralph Biamonte (2011, 2013)

== Winners of the Frost King Stakes ==
Year	Winner	Jockey	Trainer	Owner	Time
2017	Be Vewy Vewy Quiet	Rafael Hernandez	Robert Tiller	Giulio, D'Onofrio, Peri	1:23.28
2016	Pachi Cruze	Eurico Duplicate	Jose Corales	Jose Corales	1:05.73
2015	Ami's Gizmo	Luis Contreras	Josie Caroll	Ivan Dalos	1:22.69
2014	Phil's Cocktail	David Moran	John LeBlanc, Jr.	Ron I. Clarkson	1:22.94
2013	Flashy Margaritta	Patrick Husbands	Ralph Biamonte	Danny Lococo & Mary Biamonte	1:23.77
2012	Honorable Guest	Patrick Husbands	Mark Casse	G.G. Racing Stable	1:23.76
2011	Jenna's Wabbit	Patrick Husbands	Ralph Biamonte	Danny Lococo & Mary Biamonte	1:23.29
2010	NO RACE				
2009	Mobthewarrior	Emile Ramsammy	Greg de Gannes	Andrew Fredericks	1:23.53
2008	Shut It Down	Tyler Pizarro	Lorne Richards	K. K. Sangara	1:22.21
2007	Stuck In Traffic	David Clark	Nicholas Gonzalez	M.A.D. Racing/M. Gonzaalez	1:23.09
2006	Dancer's Bajan	Corey Fraser	Robert P. Tiller	Frank DiGiulio, Jr.	1:24.97
2005	Bad Hat	Slade Callaghan	Michael DePaulo	Farr Bloodstock Inc. et al.	1:24.75
2004	Enough Is Enough	Todd Kabel	Steve Attard	J. Milloy/S. Pettle/S. Attard	1:25.29
2003	Copper Trail	Francine Villeneuve	James E. Day	Stolar Stables	1:24.82
2002	Snake Pit	Richard Dos Ramos	Barbara Minshall	Minshall Farms	1:25.10
2000	Swamp Line	Simon Husbands	Robert E. Fisher	Robert E. Fisher	1:26.18
1999	Classic Partner	Todd Kabel	Ronald G. Burke	G. Vasey / J. Murphy	1:25.60
1998	Keg of Dynamite	Robert Landry	Michael J. Wright	J. Shefsky & Tenney	1:24.80
1997	Eastern Answer	Richard Dos Ramos	Michael Keogh	Gus Schickedanz	1:24.20
