= Sunfire (horse) =

American-bred Thoroughbred racehorse

- Sire: Olambala
- Grandsire: Ornus
- Dam: Sunburst
- Damsire: Banastar
- Sex: Stallion
- Foaled: 1925
- Country: United States
- Color: Bay
- Breeder: Richard T. Wilson, Jr.
- Owner: Richard T. Wilson, Jr.
- Trainer: Thomas J. Healey
- Record: 73: 21-?-?
- Earnings: $66,206

Major wins
- Ohio Derby (1928); Toronto Cup Handicap (1928, 1929); Windsor Hotel Cup Handicap (1928); Ballston Handicap (1929)
- Last updated on November 4, 2021

Sunfire (foaled 1925 in Kentucky) was an American Thoroughbred racehorse, bred and raced by the co-owner and president of Saratoga Race Course, Richard T. Wilson, Jr.

== Background ==
Sunfire was sired by Wilson's Olambala, a multiple winner of important races including the Latonia Derby and Suburban Handicap and sire of several top runners including the 1916 American Champion Two-Year-Old Colt Campfire, and Belmont and Preakness Stakes winner Pillory.

== Racing career ==
Sunfire was conditioned for racing by future U.S. Racing Hall of Fame trainer T. J. Healey. In 1928, he won the Toronto Cup Handicap at Old Woodbine Racetrack in Toronto, Ontario, Canada and the Ohio Derby, held at Bainbridge Park Race Track near Cleveland Ohio. In winning the Ohio Derby under jockey Roger Leonard, Sunfire set a new Bainbridge Park Race Track course record of 1:52 1/5 for a mile and a furlong.

At Blue Bonnets Raceway in Montreal Sunfire won the eighteenth edition of the Windsor Hotel Cup Handicap. A race open to horses age three and older, Sunfire was the only three-year-old in a field of seven runners.

Raced again at age four, back in Toronto Sunfire won his second straight Toronto Cup Handicap and ran second to Preakness Stakes runner-up Sir Harry in the 1929 King Edward Gold Cup Handicap.

Sunfire was not successful at stud.
