= Olambala =

American-bred Thoroughbred racehorse

- Sire: Ornus
- Grandsire: Bend Or
- Dam: Blue and White
- Damsire: Virgil
- Sex: Stallion
- Foaled: 1906
- Country: United States
- Color: Bay
- Breeder: John G. Greener
- Owner: Montpelier Stable
- Trainer: Thomas J. Healey
- Record: 54: 17-17-8
- Earnings: US$41,317

Major wins
- Latonia Derby (1909); Municipal Handicap (1909); Saratoga Cup (1909); Champlain Handicap (1910); Commonwealth Handicap (1910); Brighton Handicap (1910); Saratoga Handicap (1910); Suburban Handicap (1910) England; Sandringham Plate (1911)

Honors
- Olambala Handicap at Saratoga Race Course
- Last updated on April 10, 2010

Olambala (1906–1935) was an American Thoroughbred racehorse.

== Background ==
Olambala was bred in Tennessee by John G. Greener. He was sired by the British-born sire Ornus, a son of Bend Or, a two-time leading broodmare sire in Great Britain & Ireland who was imported to stand at stud in the United States. Olambala's dam was Blue and White, a daughter of the 1885 leading sire in North America, Virgil.

Owned by Richard Thornton Wilson Jr. and raced under the name of his Montpelier Stable, Olambala was conditioned for racing by future U.S. Racing Hall of Fame inductee, Thomas J. Healey.

== Racing career ==
The colt won important races at age three including the 1909 Latonia Derby and equaled the track record at Saratoga Race Course for a mile and three quarters in winning the Saratoga Cup.

As a four-year-old in 1910, won two of the three most important races in the United States open to older horses. Best at longer distances, Olambala did not run in the one mile Metropolitan Handicap but under jockey George Archibald he won both the Suburban and Brighton Handicaps. At Sheepshead Bay Race Track, Olambala equaled the world record for a mile and a quarter on dirt in winning the Commonwealth Handicap.

As a result of New York's Hart–Agnew Law, in 1911 and 1912 there was no horse racing in New York State as well as most of the rest of the United States. As such, Olambala's owner sent him to race at tracks in various cities in the Province of Ontario and in the City of Montreal, Quebec in Canada.

== Stud record ==
Retired from racing after the 1912 season, Olambala proved successful standing at stud at Kirklevington Farm near Lexington, Kentucky. Among his offspring were:

- Campfire (b. 1914) – 1916 American Champion Two-Year-Old Colt
- Hannibal (b. 1916) – wins include the Saratoga Special Stakes (1918), Travers Stakes (1919)
- Pillory (b. 1919) – won 1922 Preakness and Belmont Stakes
- Sunfire (b. 1925) – Multiple stakes winner including the 1928 and 1929 Toronto Cup Handicap
- Action (b. 1929) – in 1936 won the Aqueduct, Edgemere, and Manhattan Handicaps.
