= T. J. Healey =

American racehorse trainer (1866–1944)

Thomas J. Healey
Personal information
- Born: July 16, 1866 Fordham, New York, United States
- Died: October 7, 1944 (aged 78) Holmdel, New Jersey, United States
- Occupation: Horse trainer

Horse racing career
- Sport: Horse racing

Major racing wins
- Daisy Stakes (1896, 1897); Tidal Stakes (1899); Spring Stakes (1900, 1905); Lawrence Realization Stakes (1901); Withers Stakes (1901, 1930, 1933); New Rochelle Handicap (1904); Rosebuds Stakes (1904); Surf Stakes (1904); Champlain Handicap (1905, 1910, 1927); Dolphin Stakes (1907); Paumonok Handicap (1907, 1908); Saratoga Handicap (1908, 1910); Municipal Handicap (1909); Saratoga Cup (1909, 1933); Twin City Handicap (1909); Brighton Handicap (1910); Durham Cup Handicap (1911); Grey Handicap (1911); Walden Stakes (1911); Brooklyn Handicap (1915, 1928); Futurity Stakes (1916, 1929, 1931); Great American Stakes (1915, 1916, 1930); Hopeful Stakes (1916, 1935); Sanford Stakes (1916, 1926); Toboggan Handicap (1917, 1920, 1932); Demoiselle Stakes (1925, 1932, 1937); Havre de Grace Cup Handicap (1925, 1932); Jerome Handicap (1925); Latonla Championship Stakes (1926); Oakdale Handicap (1926); Autumn Handicap (1927); Autumn Stakes (1928); Jockey Club Cup Handicap (1927); Toronto Cup Handicap (1927, 1928, 1929); Windsor Hotel Cup Handicap (1928); Victoria Stakes (1929); Fashion Stakes (1930, 1934); Great American Stakes (1930); Pimlico Futurity (1930, 1931); Arlington Lassie Stakes (1931, 1934); Matron Stakes (1931); Saratoga Special Stakes (1931); Spinaway Stakes (1931); Woodstock Stakes (1931); Acorn Stakes (1932); Alabama Stakes (1932); Arlington Oaks (1932); Bay Shore Handicap (1932); Coaching Club American Oaks (1932); Jamaica Handicap (1932); Ladies Handicap (1932); Metropolitan Handicap (1932, 1933); Stars and Stripes Handicap (1932); Whitney Handicap (1932); Wilson Stakes (1932, 1933); Arlington Handicap (1933); Carter Handicap (1933); Hawthorne Gold Cup Handicap (1933); Philadelphia Handicap (1933, 1934); Saratoga Cup (1933); Suburban Handicap (1933); Dixie Handicap (1934); Wood Memorial Stakes (1935) American Classic Race wins: Preakness Stakes (1901, 1922, 1923, 1926, 1929); Belmont Stakes (1922)

Honors
- National Museum of Racing and Hall of Fame (1955); Thomas J. Healey Handicap at Garden State Park Racetrack

Significant horses
- Campfire, Display, Dr. Freeland, Equipoise, Jabot, Olambala, Pillory, Sunfire, The Parader, Top Flight, Vigil

Thomas J. Healey (July 16, 1866 - October 7, 1944) was an American Thoroughbred horse racing Hall of Fame trainer.

Regularly referred to as "T. J." by both his associates and the media, Healey was born near the site of Fordham University in Fordham, New York. Growing up he worked on his father's dairy farm but rather than cows, his interests centered on Thoroughbred horses. While in his teens he took a job at a racetrack stable and by his early twenties had already begun training horses. In 1888, at Brooklyn's Gravesend Race Track, he saddled the first winner of his fifty-four-year career. For the next eighteen years he ran one of the largest public stables in the United States but in 1896 became the trainer for the Montpelier Stable of Richard T. Wilson, Jr., president of Saratoga Race Course. Among the notable horses he trained for Wilson's stable were:

- The Parader - won the 1901 Preakness Stakes, Withers Stakes, Lawrence Realization Handicap;
- Olambala - wins include the 1909 Latonia Derby and 1910 Brighton and Suburban Handicaps;
- Campfire - United States leading money winner in 1916 and American Champion Two-Year-Old Colt;
- Hannibal - won 1918 Saratoga Special Stakes, 1919 Travers Stakes;
- Pillory - won 1922 Preakness and Belmont Stakes;
- Wilderness - won 1925 Travers Stakes and Toronto Cup Handicap;
- Sunfire - won back-to-back runnings of the Toronto Cup Handicap in 1928–1929.

At the turn of the century, Healey trained horses for several prominent owners. Among them were Andrew Miller and Walter J. Salmon, Sr. Healey won his third Preakness Stakes with Salmon, Sr.'s colt Vigil in 1923. During the 1920s and into the first part of the 1930s, T. J. Healey also trained horses owned by Walter and Sarah Jeffords. For them, he won his fourth and fifth Preakness Stakes with:

- Display - won the 1926 Preakness Stakes, the 1927 Toronto Cup, Jockey Club Cup, and Washington Handicaps, the 1928 Autumn and Hawthorne Gold Cup Handicaps
- Dr. Freeland - won the 1929 Preakness Stakes, 1931 Yorktown Handicap

Richard T. Wilson, Jr. died in December 1929 and Healey was hired by Harry Payne Whitney and his son, Cornelius Vanderbilt Whitney. Over a four-year period, T. J. Healey won a record $1,453,868 with Whitney runners. Among the most famous horses he race conditioned for Whitney were:

- Top Flight - American Champion Two-Year-Old Filly (1931) and American Champion Three-Year-Old Filly (1932), U.S. Racing Hall of Fame inductee
- Equipoise - American Horse of the Year 1932–33, U.S. Racing Hall of Fame inductee

Thomas J. Healey retired from training in 1941 after which he served as a steward for the New Jersey State Racing Association. He died at age 78 on October 7, 1944. Following its formation at Saratoga Springs, New York, in 1955 Thomas J. Healey was part of the inaugural class of inductees to the U.S. Racing Hall of Fame.

== John A. Healey ==
At the time of his death, Thomas J. Healey and his wife Margaret had five daughters and a son, John A. Healey. Known as Jack, the younger Healey worked as an assistant with his father and often was responsible for overseeing a string of racehorses competing at tracks outside their New York/New Jersey base. When the new Santa Anita Park opened in Arcadia, California in 1935, Jack Healey was sent with a string of horses by stable owner C. V. Whitney to compete there during the winter racing season. Jack Healey won the 1935 San Carlos Handicap, San Gabriel Handicap, and San Vicente Stakes.

Jack Healey made his home at Boxwood Farm in Cockeysville, Maryland. After his father's retirement, he was hired by Harry & Jane du Pont Lunger of Wilmington, Delaware to take charge of their Christiana Stables. Less than two months after he won the 1947 Modesty Stakes at Washington Park Race Track in Chicago, Jack Healey fell ill and died at age forty-three on September 8, 1947, at Johns Hopkins Hospital in Baltimore, Maryland .
