= Laurie Silvera =

Canadian thoroughbred racehorse trainer (born 1939)

Personal information
- Born: July 7, 1939 Kingston, Jamaica
- Died: March 2, 2020 (aged 80)
- Occupation: Trainer

Horse racing career
- Sport: Horse racing
- Career wins: 1,024+

Major racing wins
- Victoria Stakes (1980); Highlander Stakes (1981); Nearctic Stakes (1981); Connaught Cup Stakes (1984); Bold Venture Stakes (1987, 1988); Woodstock Stakes (1990, 1996); My Dear Stakes (1991, 1992, 1997); Summer Stakes (1991); Duchess Stakes (1992); Vigil Stakes (1992); Ontario Debutante Stakes (1998); Bold Ruckus Stakes (2003); Vice Regent Stakes (2003); Bunty Lawless Stakes (2003, 2005); Bessarabian Stakes (2010)

Significant horses
- Free At Last

Laurie Silvera (born July 7, 1939, in Kingston, Jamaica) is a Canadian thoroughbred racehorse trainer. A resident of Guelph, Ontario, he has been training professionally since 1975 at racetracks in the Toronto area. He won three consecutive Spring training titles at Greenwood Raceway between 1989 and 1991.

On April 13, 2014, Silvera achieved his 1000th career win in North America, not to mention over 200 wins while residing in Jamaica.

His son, Arthur Silvera, is also a trainer based at Woodbine Racetrack.
