= Campfire (horse) =

American Thoroughbred racehorse

- Sire: Olambala
- Grandsire: Ornus
- Dam: Nightfall
- Damsire: Voter
- Sex: Stallion
- Foaled: 1914
- Country: United States
- Colour: Chestnut
- Breeder: Richard T. Wilson, Jr.
- Owner: Richard T. Wilson, Jr.
- Trainer: Thomas J. Healey
- Record: 14: 7-3-0
- Earnings: $54,135

Major wins
- Saratoga Special Stakes (1916); Sanford Stakes (1916); Hopeful Stakes (1916); Great American Stakes (1916); Belmont Futurity Stakes (1916); Toboggan Handicap (1917)

Awards
- American Champion Two-Year-Old Colt (1916)
- Last updated on February 22, 2010

Campfire (1914–1932) was an American Thoroughbred racehorse.

== Background ==
Bred and raced by the co-owner and president of Saratoga Race Course, Richard T. Wilson, Jr., he was sired by Wilson's Olambala, a multiple winner of important races including the Latonia Derby and Suburban Handicap who also sired several top runners including the multiple Handicap winner Sunfire and 1922 Belmont and Preakness Stakes winner Pillory. Campfire was conditioned for racing by future U.S. Racing Hall of Fame trainer T. J. Healey.

== Racing career ==
Racing at age two in 1916, Campfire joined the great filly Regret as only the second horse to win all three Saratoga Race Course events for two-year-olds: the Saratoga Special Stakes, Sanford Stakes, and Hopeful Stakes, in which he defeated Omar Khayyam. Winning all three races was not matched for another seventy-seven years, when Dehere did it in 1993 followed by City Zip in 2000. In addition, Campfire won the Futurity and Great American Stakes at Belmont Park. He was leading money winner among all American horses in 1916 irrespective of age. His outstanding year led to his being retrospectively named American Champion Two-Year-Old Colt by The Blood-Horse magazine.

At age three, much was expected of Campfire. He won the Toboggan Handicap at Aqueduct Racetrack in New York City but did not win another race that year or at age four in 1918.

== Stud record ==
Retired to stud for the 1919 season, Campfire met with limited success as a sire. Most notable was his son Wilderness, who won the 1923 Toronto Cup Handicap and the Travers Stakes, and Vander Pool, who won a record-tying fifteen consecutive races.

Campfire died at a Maryland farm in 1932.
