= My Dear III =

American-bred Thoroughbred racehorse

My Dear
- Sire: King James
- Grandsire: Plaudit
- Dam: Bettie Landon
- Damsire: Mantone
- Sex: filly/mare
- Foaled: 1917
- Country: United States
- Color: Bay
- Breeder: H. Rozier Dulany
- Owner: 1) H. Rozier Dulany; 2) G. W. Forman (11/1919); 2) Fred Musante (1920)
- Trainer: 1) J. Brooks; 2) W. Short; 3) Fred Musante
- Record: 95: 23-21-18
- Earnings: US$89,974

Major wins
- Chesapeake Purse (1919); Mahubah Purse (1920); Toronto Cup Handicap (1921); National Handicap (1921); Hamilton Cup (1921, 1923); Ontario Jockey Club Cup (1923); Bowie Handicap (1923); Toronto Autumn Cup (1923)

Awards
- American Champion Older Female Horse (1921)

Honors
- My Dear Stakes at Woodbine Racetrack

My Dear (foaled 1917 in Virginia) was an American Thoroughbred racehorse. She was regarded as the best older female racehorse in the United States in 1921.

== Background ==
My Dear was a bay mare bred by H. Rozier Dulany of Upperville, Virginia. She was sired by King James, the 1909 retrospective American Champion Older Male Horse|. My Dear's dam was Bettie Landon making her a full sister to Admiral Cary T. Grayson's very good colt, My Own.

== Racing career ==
At age two, My Dear raced and won in Maryland for H. Rozier Dulany but was sold to G. W. Forman in November of that year. Forman won a race with her but then sold her to trainer Fred Musante who began racing her at age three at Bowie Race Track. The filly went on to an outstanding career, enjoying her greatest successes at Old Woodbine Race Course in Toronto, Canada where since 1941 the My Dear Stakes has been raced in her honor.

My Dear regularly competed against male horses. In 1921 she defeated her male counterparts in the Toronto Cup Handicap, the National Handicap, and the Hamilton Cup, plus for the second straight year, she ran second in the Toronto Autumn Cup to U.S. Racing Hall of Fame inductee, Exterminator. Her performances earned her retrospective 1921 American Champion Older Female Horse honors. In 1922, My Dear did not earn a major race win but came back in 1923, winning the Toronto Autumn Cup, her second Hamilton Cup, the Ontario Jockey Club Cup, and in Maryland, the Bowie Handicap, all against male horses.

In November 1923, My Dear broke a bone in her leg that ended her racing career.

== Pedigree ==
Pedigree of My Dear
Sire King James	Plaudit	Himyar	Alarm
Sire King James	Plaudit	Himyar	Hira
Sire King James	Plaudit	Cinderella	Tomahawk
Sire King James	Plaudit	Cinderella	Manna
Sire King James	Unsightly	Pursebearer	Scottish Chief
Sire King James	Unsightly	Pursebearer	Thrift
Sire King James	Unsightly	Hira Villa	Himyar
Sire King James	Unsightly	Hira Villa	Tolima
Dam Bettie Landon	Mentone	Star Ruby	Hampton
Dam Bettie Landon	Mentone	Star Ruby	Ornament
Dam Bettie Landon	Mentone	Madrid	Billet
Dam Bettie Landon	Mentone	Madrid	Mercedes
Dam Bettie Landon	Laura Davis	Cherrystone	King Bolt
Dam Bettie Landon	Laura Davis	Cherrystone	Cerise
Dam Bettie Landon	Laura Davis	Scotia	Waverly
Dam Bettie Landon	Laura Davis	Scotia	Irene
