= Kiridashi (horse) =

Canadian-bred Thoroughbred racehorse

- Sire: Bold Ruckus
- Grandsire: Boldnesian
- Dam: Sharp Briar
- Damsire: Briartic
- Sex: Stallion
- Foaled: 1992
- Country: Canada
- Colour: Bay
- Breeder: Aubrey W. Minshall
- Owner: Minshall Farms
- Trainer: Barbara J. Minshall
- Earnings: $1,201,981

Major wins
- Col. R.S. Mclaughlin Handicap (1995); King Edward Breeders' Cup Handicap (1996); Fair Play Stakes (1996); Vigil Handicap (1996, 1997); Connaught Cup Stakes (1997, 1998); Jacques Cartier Stakes (1997) Canadian Classic Race wins: Prince of Wales Stakes (1995)
- Last updated on January 25, 2010

Kiridashi (foaled 1992 in Ontario) is a Canadian Thoroughbred racehorse.

== Background ==
He was bred, raced and trained by members of the Minshall family. Out of the mare, Sharp Briar, his sire was Canadian Horse Racing Hall of Fame inductee, Bold Ruckus. Grandsire Boldnesian was also the grandsire of the 1977 U.S. Triple Crown winner, Seattle Slew.

== Racing career ==
=== 1994 Two-Year-Old season ===
For trainer Barbara Minshall, Kiridashi raced at age two, notably running second in the Kingarvie Stakes.

=== 1995 Three-Year-Old season ===
At age three he ran a tired fourth to winner Regal Discovery in the Queen's Plate then won the second leg of the Canadian Triple Crown series, the Prince of Wales Stakes. For trainer Barbara Minshall, it marked the first time a woman saddled a winner of a Triple Crown race. Her accomplishment earned her a Sovereign Award nomination. Kirdashi's other 1995 win came in the Col. R.S. Mclaughlin Handicap.

=== 1996: Four-Year-Old season ===
Racing at age four in 1996, Kiridashi's wins included the King Edward Breeders' Cup Handicap, the Fair Play Stakes, in which he set a Woodbine Racetrack track record of 1:40 4/5 for a mile and a sixteenth on dirt, and Vigil Handicap. As a five-year-old, Kiridashi won the first of his two Connaught Cup Stakes on turf, his second Vigil Handicap, and the Jacques Cartier Stakes. Kiridashi finished fourth to Da Hoss in the 1996 Breeders' Cup Mile, hosted that year by Woodbine Racetrack in Toronto.

== Stud career ==
Retired after his 1998 campaign, at stud, Kiridashi's best offspring was his millionaire daughter Financingavailable who was voted the 2006 and 2007 Sovereign Award for Champion Older Female Horse plus the 2007 Sovereign Award for Champion Sprinter.
