= Toronto Cup Stakes =

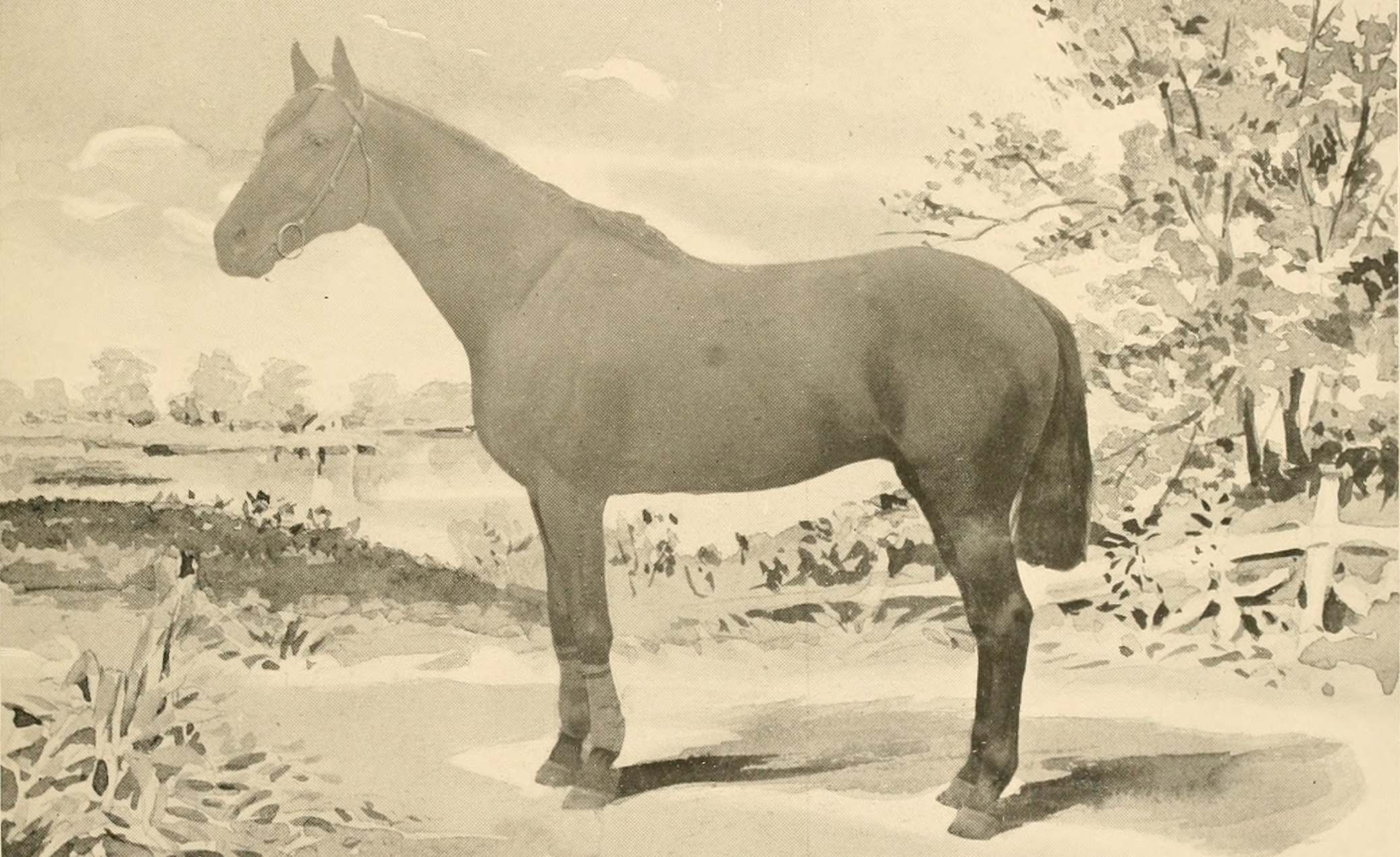
- 1894 & 1895 winner, Saragossa.
- Class: Ungraded Stakes
- Location: Woodbine Racetrack; Toronto, Ontario Canada
- Inaugurated: 1890
- Race type: Thoroughbred – Flat racing
- Website: woodbineentertainment.com

Race information
- Distance: 1 1/8 miles (9 furlongs)
- Surface: Turf
- Track: Left-handed
- Qualification: Three-year-olds
- Weight: Assigned
- Purse: $150,000

The Toronto Cup Stakes is a Canadian Thoroughbred horse race run annually on turf at Woodbine Racetrack in Toronto. Run in early July, the race is open to three-year-olds and is run over a distance of 1 1/8 miles (9 furlongs) on turf.

Inaugurated in 1890 as the Toronto Cup Handicap at the Old Woodbine Racetrack, it was raced on dirt and open to older horses until 1935. From inception through 1898 it was raced at 1 1/4 miles, then from 1899 to 1934 at 1 1/8 miles. There was no race in 1918 and 1919 and was suspended in 1935 then revived in 1953 restricted to three-year-olds and competed at a distance of 1 1/16 miles on dirt. Since 1958 the race has been run on the turf with the exception of 1968 when it had to be switched to the main dirt track. In 1987 the turf race was modified to its present 1 1/8 miles except for 1994 when it was held at the Fort Erie Racetrack and run at its old 1 1/16-mile distance.

The race was run in two divisions in 1983, 1986, and 1999.

== Records ==
Speed record:

- 1:47.00 – Skybound (1997) (at current distance of 1 1/8 miles on turf)

Most wins by an owner:

- 11 – Sam-Son Farm (1985, 1986, 1987, 1991, 1997, 2000, 2001, 2002, 2004, 2006, 2007)

Most wins by a jockey:

- 7 – Todd Kabel (2000, 2001, 2003, 2004, 2005, 2006, 2007)

Most wins by a trainer:

- 7 – Mark Frostad (1997, 2000, 2001, 2002, 2004, 2006, 2007)

== Winners ==
Year	Winner	Jockey	Trainer	Owner	Time
2018	March to the Arch	Gary Boulanger	Mark Casse	Live Oak Plantation	1:48.07
2017	Final Copy	Rafael Hernández	Roger Attfield	Chiefswood Stables	1:49.24
2016	Conquest Daddyo	Patrick Husbands	Mark Casse	Conquest Stables	1:47.12
2015	Conquest Pacemaker	Eurico da Silva	Mark Casse	Conquest Stables	1:46.08
2014	Lafontaine	Steve Bahen	Elizabeth Charalambous	Cudney Stables	1:48.86
2013	Five Iron	Luis Contreras	Brian Lynch	Fred M. Allor	1:47.41
2012	Patrioticandproud	Eurico da Silva	Mark Casse	Eclipse Thoroughbred Partners/Barber	1:48.33
2011	Clement Rock	Luis Contreras	Mark Casse	Melnyk Racing Stables	1:46.98
2010	Stormy Lord	James McAleney	Ian Black	Hat Trick Stable/Kinghaven Farms	1:49.62
2009	Crown Isle	Emma-Jayne Wilson	John Charalambous	Uphill Stable	1:48.86
2008	Secret Getaway	Emma-Jayne Wilson	Michael Stidham	Sand and Cee Stables	1:52.54
2007	Windward Islands	Todd Kabel	Mark Frostad	Sam-Son Farm	1:49.58
2006	French Beret	Todd Kabel	Mark Frostad	Sam-Son Farm	1:51.03
2005	T.D. Vance	Todd Kabel	H. Graham Motion	Courtlandt Farms	1:51.39
2004	Silver Ticket	Todd Kabel	Mark Frostad	Sam-Son Farm	1:47.35
2003	Mobil	Todd Kabel	Mike Keogh	Bruno Schickedanz	1:49.15
2002	Portcullis	Slade Callaghan	Mark Frostad	Sam-Son Farm	1:47.98
2001	Strut The Stage	Todd Kabel	Mark Frostad	Sam-Son Farm	1:47.91
2000	Think Red	Todd Kabel	Mark Frostad	Sam-Son Farm	1:48.76
1999	Appalachian Chief	Richard Dos Ramos	James M. Dalton	William A. Sorokolit Sr.	1:47.22
1999	Zanetti	David Clark	James E. Day	John R. Piconi	1:47.88
1998	Ragged Kingdom	David Clark	Josie Carroll	Eaton Hall Farm	1:47.40
1997	Skybound	Emile Ramsammy	Mark Frostad	Sam-Son Farm	1:47.00
1996	Ok by Me	Cornelio Velásquez	John B. Bond	Rudlein Stable/Clifton Jr.	1:47.40
1995	All Firmed Up	Robert Landry	Daniel J. Vella	Frank Stronach	1:49.40
1994	St. Clair Winger	Robert King Jr.	Ann Kuti	T. J. Molony	1:45.20
1993	Goes On	Ray Sabourin	W. Lawrence	W. Clayton	1:47.60
1992	Beverlee Hills Doc	Ray Sabourin	Phil Gracey	S & G Racing Stable	1:47.40
1991	Rainbows For Life	Jack Lauzon	James E. Day	Sam-Son Farm	1:50.60
1990	Thunder Regent	Sandy Hawley	Vincent E. Tesoro	Douglas Wilkinson	1:47.00
1989	Charlie Barley	Robin Platts	Grant Pearce	King Caledon Farm	1:48.40
1988	Smart Lord	Robin Platts	Macdonald Benson	Windfields Farm	1:47.00
1987	Duckpower	Dave Penna	James E. Day	Sam-Son Farm	1:50.80
1986	Carotene	Richard Dos Ramos	David R. Bell	Kinghaven Farms	1:44.40
1986	No Louder	Jeffrey Fell	James E. Day	Sam-Son Farm	1:42.60
1985	Imperial Choice	Irwin Driedger	James E. Day	Sam-Son Farm	1:42.60
1984	Hurontario	Irwin Driedger	Emile Allain	Helen Stollery	1:42.20
1983	Kingsbridge	Robin Platts	John J. Tammaro Jr.	Kinghaven Farm	1:45.00
1983	Pax Nobiscum	Dan Beckon	Dinny Day	Kingfield Farm	1:45.60
1982	Son of Briartic	Paul Souter	Jerry G. Lavigne	Paddockhurst Stable	1:43.40
1981	Frost King	Lloyd Duffy	Bill Marko	T. Smith & B. Marko	1:44.80
1980	Allan Blue	Joey Belowus	Gil Rowntree	Stafford Farms	1:44.00
1979	Coup de Chance	Paul Souter	Yonnie Starr	Jean-Louis Levesque	1:42.40
1978	Lucky Colonel S.	Sandy Hawley	Donnie Walker	Conn Smythe	1:43.40
1977	Strategic Command	Jeffrey Fell	Jerry C. Meyer	Grovetree Stable et al.	1:43.80
1976	Military Bearing	Avelino Gomez	James C. Bentley	J. D. Corcoran	1:43.00
1975	Mystery Time	William Parsons	Lyle O. Anderson	S. Douglas	1:43.20
1974	Sam's Own	William McMahon	Jerry C. Meyer	Mr. & Mrs. S. Shapiro	1:46.60
1973	Quil's Boy	Sandy Hawley	Jerry C. Meyer	Shefry Farm	1:45.00
1972	Presidial	John LeBlanc	William Reeves	Windfields Farm	1:44.00
1971	Speedy Zephyr	Herb Hinojosa	Les Lear	Charles I. Rathgeb	1:42.60
1970	Croquemitaine	Sandy Hawley	Yonnie Starr	Jean-Louis Levesque	1:42.80
1969	Jumpin Joseph	Avelino Gomez	Warren Beasley	Warren Beasley	1:44.20
1968	Big Blunder	James Fitzsimmons	Arthur H. Warner	Lanson Farm	1:44.20
1967	Gilmore	Richard Grubb	Roy Johnson	Golden West Farm	1:55.80
1966	Ice Water	Avelino Gomez	Lou Cavalaris Jr.	Gardiner Farm	1:44.20
1965	Victorian Era	Avelino Gomez	Lou Cavalaris Jr.	A. Case	1:48.20
1964	Return Trip	James Fitzsimmons	Roy Johnson	Golden West Farm	1:44.20
1964	Arctic Hills	Herb Dalton	W. Moorhead	Vernon G. Cardy	1:44.20
1963	Belfort	Donald Hale	John Passero	S. J. Santangelo	1:44.40
1962	Burnt Roman	John R. Adams	K. Nicholds	Keane & Waggoner	1:48.00
1961	Recitatif	John R. Adams	Carl F. Chapman	T. Davis Jr.	1:48.60
1960	Hidden Treasure	Al Coy	John Passero	William R. Beasley	1:44.80
1959	Anita's Son	Hugo Dittfach	Arthur H. Warner	Lanson Farm	1:43.00
1958	Foxy Phil	C. O'Brien	Arthur H. Warner	Lanson Farm	1:46.80
1957	Pink Velvet	Ernie Warme	John Passero	William R. Beasley	1:45.00
1956	Censor	Avelino Gomez	Gordon J. McCann	Winifred Taylor	1:47.00
1955	Momus	L. Richards	V. Scott	North Downs Farm	1:45.00
1954	Queen's Own	B. Albert	Gordon J. McCann	E. P. Taylor	1:44.60
1953	Navy Page	Jose Vina	Gordon J. McCann	E. P. Taylor	1:44.40
1934	Hokuao	Frank Mann	Frank Gilpin	W. I. Newmarch	1:52.20
1933	Broadway Lights	J. Mattioli	S. White	T. McCarthy	1:52.40
1932	Tred Avon	James H. Burke	William Irvine	Sylvester W. Labrot	1:55.60
1931	Frisius	Anthony Pascuma	George Tappen	Belair Stud Stable	1:53.40
1930	Son O' Battle	John Maiben	Thomas H. McCreery	J. Frederic Byers	1:52.00
1929	Sunfire	Roger Leonard	Thomas J. Healey	Richard T. Wilson Jr.	1:51.60
1928	Sunfire	John Callahan	Thomas J. Healey	Richard T. Wilson Jr.	1:52.00
1927	Display	Louis Schaefer	Thomas J. Healey	Walter J. Salmon Sr.	1:52.40
1926	Joy Smoke	James H. Butwell	William Irvine	Edward F. Whitney	1:53.00
1925	Wilderness	J. D. Mooney	J. Pryce	Richard T. Wilson Jr.	1:52.60
1924	Digit	T. Wilson	William H. Bringloe	Seagram Stable	1:55.20
1923	Spot Cash	Fred J. Stevens	James W. Healy	Harry Payne Whitney	1:51.40
1922	Golden Sphere	John McTaggart	William H. Bringloe	Seagram Stable	1:51.40
1921	My Dear	Thomas Parrington	Fred Musante	Fred Musante	1:54.60
1920	Irish Kiss	L. Morris	Robert A. Smith	Sunnyland Stable	1:52.60
1917	Runes	Thomas Parrington	J. Edwards	Mirasol Stable	1:51.60
1916	Runes	Thomas Parrington	J. Edwards	Mirasol Stable	1:52.40
1915	Kingly	Eddie Ambrose	Michael J. Daly	Mizpath Stable	1:53.00
1914	Waterbass	J. Smyth	W. Martin	A. Turney	1:52.00
1913	Horron	Clarence Turner	W. Martin	Amos Turney	1:52.60
1912	Star Charter	Clarence Turner	John F. Schorr	John W. Schorr	1:52.60
1911	The Nigger	Sweeney	John Duffy	T. R. Condran	1:52.00
1910	King James	Carroll H. Shilling	David J. Leary	Sam Hildreth	1:53.80
1909	King James	Guy Burns	David J. Leary	Sam Hildreth	1:56.00
1908	Clell Turney	J. Bergen	A. Lewis	Amos Turney	1:57.80
1907	Inferno	R. McDaniel	Barry Littlefield	Joseph E. Seagram	1:52.60
1906	Minnie Adams	Nicol	F. Rector	F. Cook	1:52.00
1905	Tongorder	Eric Walsh	John Dyment Jr.	Nathaniel Dyment	1:56.00
1904	Fort Hunter	J. Walsh	John Dyment Jr.	Nathaniel Dyment	1:55.75
1903	Claude	M. Daly	J. Daly	Michael J. Daly	1:59.00
1902	Gold Cure	Daugman	Frank McCabe	Joseph E. Seagram	1:58.00
1901	Sannazarro	Jimmy Boland	William M. Hayes	William M. Hayes	2:02.25
1900	Martimas	Ballard	Ed Whyte	William Hendrie	1:57.00
1899	Satirist	McIntyre	Charles Boyle	Joseph E. Seagram	1:56.25
1898	Mazarine	Bert Knapp	not found	Bennington et al.	2:11.25
1897	Tragedian	Sullivan	Charles Boyle	Joseph E. Seagram	2:11.25
1896	Maurice	Blake	n/a	W. M. Barrick	2:14.50
1895	Saragossa	Bert Knapp	J. R. Walker	Joseph E. Seagram	2:10.00
1894	Saragossa	A. Brooker	J. R. Walker	Joseph E. Seagram	2:17.50
1893	Copyright	Doane	Michael J. Daly	Michael J. Daly	2:12.00
1892	Fenelon	Carter	J. Hanning	J. W. Smythe	2:17.50
1891	My Fellow	Wise	D. Higgins	D. Higgins	2:12.00
1890	Banjo	Shauer	B. Alcock	William Hendrie	2:14.75

* In 1964 there was a dead heat for first.
