= Vice Regent Stakes =

- Class: Restricted Stakes
- Location: Woodbine Racetrack; Toronto, Ontario, Canada
- Inaugurated: 1997
- Race type: Thoroughbred - Flat racing
- Website: woodbineentertainment.com

Race information
- Distance: One Mile (8 furlongs)
- Surface: Turf
- Track: Left-handed
- Qualification: Three-years-old (Ontario Sire Stakes program)
- Weight: Allowances
- Purse: $95,200 (2016)

The Vice Regent Stakes is a thoroughbred horse race run annually since 1997 at the end of August at Woodbine Racetrack in Toronto, Ontario, Canada.

An Ontario Sire Stakes, it is a restricted race for three-year-olds raced over a distance of one mile (8 furlongs) on Turf and currently carries a purse of $95,200.

The race was named to honor Vice Regent, the important Canadian Horse Racing Hall of Fame sire. Vice Regent's son Randy Regent, won the inaugural running in 1997 in record time that stood until 2008.

== Records ==
Speed record: (Through 1998, Woodbine times were recorded in fifths of a second. Since 1999 they are in hundredths of a second)

- 1:33.76 - Sand Cove (2008)

Most wins by an owner:

- 2 - RMC Stable (2001, 2005)
- 2 - Paul Buttigieg (2010, 2014)

Most wins by a jockey:

- 2 - Na Somsanith (1999, 2001)
- 2 - Ray Sabourin (2002, 2004)
- 2 - Emile Ramsammy (2003, 2005)

Most wins by a trainer:

- 2 - Paul Buttigieg (2010, 2014)

== Winners ==
Year	Winner	Jockey	Trainer	Owner	Time
2016	Thor's Rocket	David Moran	Paul M. Buttigieg	Buttigieg Training Centre/Vlahos	1:44.49
2015	Born in a Breeze	Alan Garcia	Mark R. Frostad	Earle I. Mack	1:34.85
2014	Too Many Egbert's	David Moran	Paul Buttigieg	Buttigieg Training Centre	1:34.75
2013	San Nicola Thunder	Justin Stein	John Cardella	Cooper/Pirone	1:35.97
2012	Seen It All Before	Luis Contreras	Ashlee Brnjas	Colebrook Farms	1:35.17
2011	Welloiledmachine	Jim McAleney	Mike Keogh	Christine & Dennis Windsor	1:39.27
2010	Officeinthevalley	Richard Dos Ramos	Paul Buttigieg	Paul M. Buttigieg	1:35.86
2009	Guipago	Tyler Pizarro	Analisa M. Delmas	Fieldstone Farms	1:34.33
2008	Sand Cove	Slade Callaghan	Roger Attfield	Ralph Johnson	1:33.76
2007	Rahy's Attorney	Robert Landry	Ian Black	Ellie Boje Farm et al.	1:36.20
2006	Another Ascot	Constant Montpellier	Michael DePaulo	California Stable	1:38.09
2005	Decew Falls	Emile Ramsammy	Mike Keogh	RMC Stable	1:39.38
2004	Archers Bow	Ray Sabourin	Michael J. Wright	S. J. Anstey et al.	1:40.83
2003	Tusayan	Emile Ramsammy	Laurie Silvera	L. Silvera / S. Kilambi	1:36.97
2002	Mighty Quinn	Ray Sabourin	Malcolm Pierce	Windways Farm/Quinn Stable	1:37.34
2001	Indian Dan	Na Somsanith	John A. Ross	RMC Stable	1:36.83
2000	High Speed Travel	Todd Kabel	Barbara J. Minshall	Minshall Farms	1:37.01
1999	Ruxsh	Na Somsanith	Earl Barnett	Jal Dastur	1:37.40
1998	Goldmart Prince	Kelly MacKay	Wray I. Lawrence	Goldmart Farms	1:35.60
1997	Randy Regent	Sandy Hawley	Mark Frostad	Sam-Son Farm	1:35.20
