= Son of Briartic =

Canadian-bred Thoroughbred racehorse

- Sire: Briartic
- Grandsire: Nearctic
- Dam: Tabola
- Damsire: Round Table
- Sex: Stallion
- Foaled: 1979
- Country: Canada
- Colour: Liver Chestnut
- Breeder: E. P. Taylor
- Owner: Paddockhurst Stable (Dave Kapchinsky)
- Trainer: Jerry G. Lavigne
- Record: 30: 8-5-3
- Earnings: $380,470

Major wins
- Kingarvie Stakes (1981); Swynford Stakes (1981); Vandal Stakes (1981); Toronto Cup Handicap (1982); Sir Barton Stakes (1982); Canadian Triple Crown wins: Queen's Plate (1982)

Honours
- Son of Briartic Stakes at Emerald Downs

Son of Briartic (1979–2003) was a Canadian Thoroughbred racehorse. Bred by Canada's most prominent horseman, E. P. Taylor, he was out of the mare Tabola, a daughter of U.S. Racing Hall of Fame inductee Round Table. His sire was the multiple stakes winner Briartic, a son of Canadian Horse Racing Hall of Fame inductee Nearctic, who also sired Northern Dancer.

Son of Briartic was purchased by Dave Kapchinsky of Edmonton, Alberta, who was voted the 1981 Sovereign Award for Outstanding Owner in Canadian racing. Kapchinsky raced the colt under the banner of his Paddockhurst Stable with trainer Jerry Lavigne responsible for his race conditioning. At age two, Son of Briartic won three stakes races at Woodbine Racetrack in Toronto and the following year won three more stakes, including Canada's most prestigious race, the Queen's Plate. For his Plate win, under jockey Paul Souter, Son of Briartic defeated Runaway Groom, to whom he then finished third in the second leg of the Canadian Triple Crown, the Prince of Wales Stakes. Son of Briartic was also a versatile runner, winning the 1982 Toronto Cup Handicap on turf.

Retired to stud duty at first in Canada, where he had a major Impact on the Canadian racing industry, and later for many years in the State of Washington, Son of Briartic proved a good stallion who produced more than forty stakes winners. Pensioned at age twenty-two in 2001, following a fracture of a pastern bone he was humanely euthanized in 2003. His influence as a sire in Washington was such that Emerald Downs in Auburn, named a race in his honor.

Pedigree of Son of Briartic, chestnut stallion, 1979
Sire Briartic	Nearctic	Nearco	Pharos
Sire Briartic	Nearctic	Nearco	Nogara
Sire Briartic	Nearctic	Lady Angela	Hyperion
Sire Briartic	Nearctic	Lady Angela	Sister Sarah
Sire Briartic	Sweet Lady Briar	Round Table	Princequillo
Sire Briartic	Sweet Lady Briar	Round Table	Knight's Daughter
Sire Briartic	Sweet Lady Briar	Parading Lady	Bernborough
Sire Briartic	Sweet Lady Briar	Parading Lady	Polly Briar
Dam Tabola	Round Table	Princequillo	Prince Rose
Dam Tabola	Round Table	Princequillo	Cosquilla
Dam Tabola	Round Table	Knight's Daughter	Sir Cosmo
Dam Tabola	Round Table	Knight's Daughter	Feola
Dam Tabola	Bambola	Botticelli	Blue Peter
Dam Tabola	Bambola	Botticelli	Buonamica
Dam Tabola	Bambola	Mamounia	Chanteur
Dam Tabola	Bambola	Mamounia	Minaret (family: 9-c)
