= Tyler Pizarro =

Canadian jockey (born 1986)

Personal information
- Born: May 8, 1986 (age 40) Bolton, Ontario, Canada
- Occupation: Jockey

Horse racing career
- Sport: Horse racing
- Career wins: 200+ (ongoing)

Major racing wins
- Frost King Stakes (2008); Classy 'N Smart Stakes (2008); Sky Classic Stakes (2008); Alywow Stakes (2009); Fury Stakes (2009); Vigil Stakes (2009); Muskoka Stakes (2009); Overskate Stakes (2009); Vice Regent Stakes (2009); Cup and Saucer Stakes (2009); Swynford Stakes (2011); Play The King Stakes (2012)

Racing awards
- Canadian Champion Apprentice Jockey (2007)

Significant horses
- Executive Flight, Lauro

Tyler Pizarro (born May 8, 1986, in Bolton, Ontario) is a Canadian champion jockey in Thoroughbred horse racing based at Woodbine Racetrack in Toronto, Ontario.

The son of former jockey Jorge Pizarro, his mother Donna is a trainer at Woodbine Racetrack. As a boy, Pizarro began galloping horses on a farm then by age sixteen was dedicated to following in his father's footsteps and was galloping horses on a track. Turning professional in late 2005, he earned his first win on September 2, 2006, and in 2007 won 124 races at Woodbine Racetrack, more than any other apprentice jockey. His 2007 performance earned him the Sovereign Award for Outstanding Apprentice Jockey and was a finalist for the United States' Eclipse Award for Outstanding Apprentice Jockey.

On October 25, 2008, Pizarro earned his first Grade II win with a victory aboard Lauro in the Sky Classic Stakes.

== Year-end charts ==
Chart (2007–present)	Peak position
National Earnings List for Jockeys 2007	48
National Earnings List for Jockeys 2008	61
National Earnings List for Jockeys 2009	52
National Earnings List for Jockeys 2011	65
National Earnings List for Jockeys 2012	100
