= Frost King =

Canadian-bred Thoroughbred racehorse

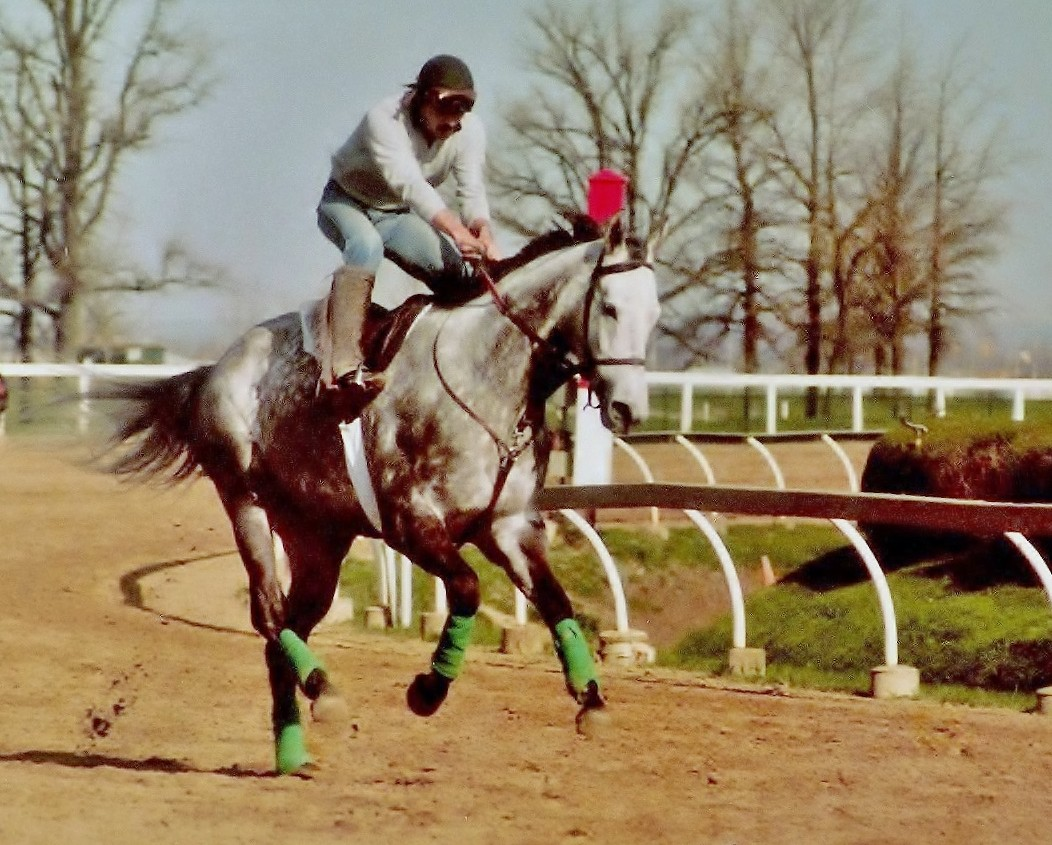
- Frost King exercising at Woodbine, 1982
- Sire: Ruritania
- Grandsire: Graustark
- Dam: Native Flower
- Damsire: Restless Native
- Sex: Gelding
- Foaled: 1978
- Country: Canada
- Colour: Gray
- Breeder: Ted Smith
- Owner: Ted Smith & Bill Marko
- Trainer: Bill Marko
- Record: 52: 26-9-3
- Earnings: $1,033,260

Major wins
- Winnipeg Futurity (1980); Cup and Saucer Stakes (1980); Achievement Handicap (1981); Bunty Lawless Stakes (1981, 1982); Canadian Derby (1981); Col. R. S. McLaughlin Stakes (1981); Plate Trial Stakes (1981); Queenston Stakes (1981); Toronto Cup Handicap (1981); Bold Venture Handicap (1982); Canadian Maturity Stakes (1982); Connaught Cup Stakes (1982); Eclipse Handicap (1982, 1983); Jacques Cartier Stakes (1982); Jockey Club Cup Handicap (1982); Dominion Day Handicap (1983); Fayette Stakes (1983); Speed To Spare Championship Stakes (1983)

Awards
- Canadian Champion Three-Year-Old Male Horse (1981); Canadian Champion Older Male Horse (1982); Canadian Champion Male Turf Horse (1982); Canadian Horse of the Year (1982)

Honours
- Canadian Horse Racing Hall of Fame (1986); Frost King Stakes at Woodbine Racetrack

Frost King (foaled 1978 in Ontario) is a Canadian Thoroughbred Champion and Hall of Fame racehorse. Bred by Ted Smith of Rockwood, Ontario, he was sired by Manhattan Handicap winner, Ruritania. His dam was Native Flower whose sire, Restless Native, was a son of U.S. Racing Hall of Fame inductee, Native Dancer.

Frost King won an impressive total of 21 stakes races in his career. He was inducted into the Canadian Horse Racing Hall of Fame in 1986.
