= Rahy's Attorney =

Canadian-bred Thoroughbred racehorse

- Sire: Crown Attorney
- Grandsire: Silver Deputy
- Dam: Rahy's Hope
- Damsire: Rahy
- Sex: Gelding
- Foaled: 2004
- Country: Canada
- Colour: Bay
- Breeder: Ellie Boje Farm (Joe & Ellen MacLellan)
- Owner: Ellie Boje Farm, Mitch Peters, Dean Read, Jim & Jean MacLellan
- Trainer: Ian Black
- Record: 41: 14-10-4
- Earnings: US$2,064,492

Major wins
- Vice Regent Stakes (2007); Bunty Lawless Stakes (2007, 2009, 2010); Connaught Cup Stakes (2008); Woodbine Mile (2008); King Edward Stakes (2009); Nijinsky Stakes (2009); With Approval Stakes (2010); Pan American Stakes (2011)

Awards
- Canadian Champion Male Turf Horse (2008)

Honours
- Canadian Horse Racing Hall of Fame (2026)

Rahy's Attorney (foaled in 2004 in Ontario) is a Canadian Thoroughbred Champion racehorse. A turf specialist, he is a Grade 1 winner and has won the Bunty Lawless Stakes on three occasions.

Trained by Ian Black, as at May 26, 2011 Rahy's Attorney has earned more than $2 million. In 2011, the seven-year-old gelding is still racing and won the March 26 Pan American Stakes at Gulfstream Park in Hallandale Beach, Florida. He officially retired after a leg injury. He will recover in Ottawa.
