= Ontario Sire Stakes =

The Ontario Sire Stakes is a category of Canadian Thoroughbred and Standardbred horse race. For Thoroughbred horse races, the race is restricted to horses of either sex sired by a stallion standing in the Province of Ontario for his entire season the year of conception and registered with the Canadian Thoroughbred Horse Society for that season.

For the Ontario Standardbred Sires Stakes program, the foal's stallion must be registered with the Ontario Sires Stakes program. To be eligible for the program, the stallion must be owned by an Ontario resident or leased to an Ontario resident.

Ontario Sire Stakes Thoroughbred races include the:

- Bull Page Stakes
- Bunty Lawless Stakes
- Deputy Minister Stakes
- Kingarvie Stakes
- La Prevoyante Stakes
- New Providence Stakes
- Shepperton Stakes
- Overskate Stakes
- Sir Barton Stakes
- Vice Regent Stakes
- Victoriana Stakes
