= James Boylen =

Canadian businessman and racehorse owner

Matthew James Boylen
- Born: August 10, 1907; Weston, Ontario, Canada
- Died: July 7, 1970 (aged 62); Toronto, Ontario, Canada
- Occupations: Businessman: Mining & smelting Racehorse owner

Matthew James Boylen (August 10, 1907 – July 7, 1970) was a Canadian businessman and Thoroughbred racehorse owner.

Jim Boylen was born in Weston, Ontario and raised in Alberta. In his early teens he left home and returned to Northern Ontario where he and elder brother Fred eventually operated a trading post. By the time he was twenty years old, Boylen had become a full-time prospector and in 1934 established business offices in the city of Toronto. He would be the founder of Brunswick Mining and Smelting Corp. Ltd in Bathurst, New Brunswick, an operation later acquired by Noranda which is now known as Xstrata.

An art collector, in 1959 Boylen was a founding donor to the Beaverbrook Art Gallery in Fredericton, New Brunswick, donating twenty-two paintings by Cornelius Krieghoff.

Boylen died at his Toronto home in 1970 and was buried in the city's Mount Pleasant Cemetery.

== Lanson Farm ==
During the 1950s and 1960s, Jim Boylen operated Lanson Farm in Malton, Ontario, a large Thoroughbred racehorse operation. He and brother Phil both were involved in the sport and famously passed on the opportunity to buy the great Northern Dancer when he was part of the E. P. Taylor annual yearling sale.

Lanson Farm won a number of important races in Canada as well as in the United States. Of their many successful horses, Anita's Son was inducted in the Canadian Horse Racing Hall of Fame.
