= Robin Platts =

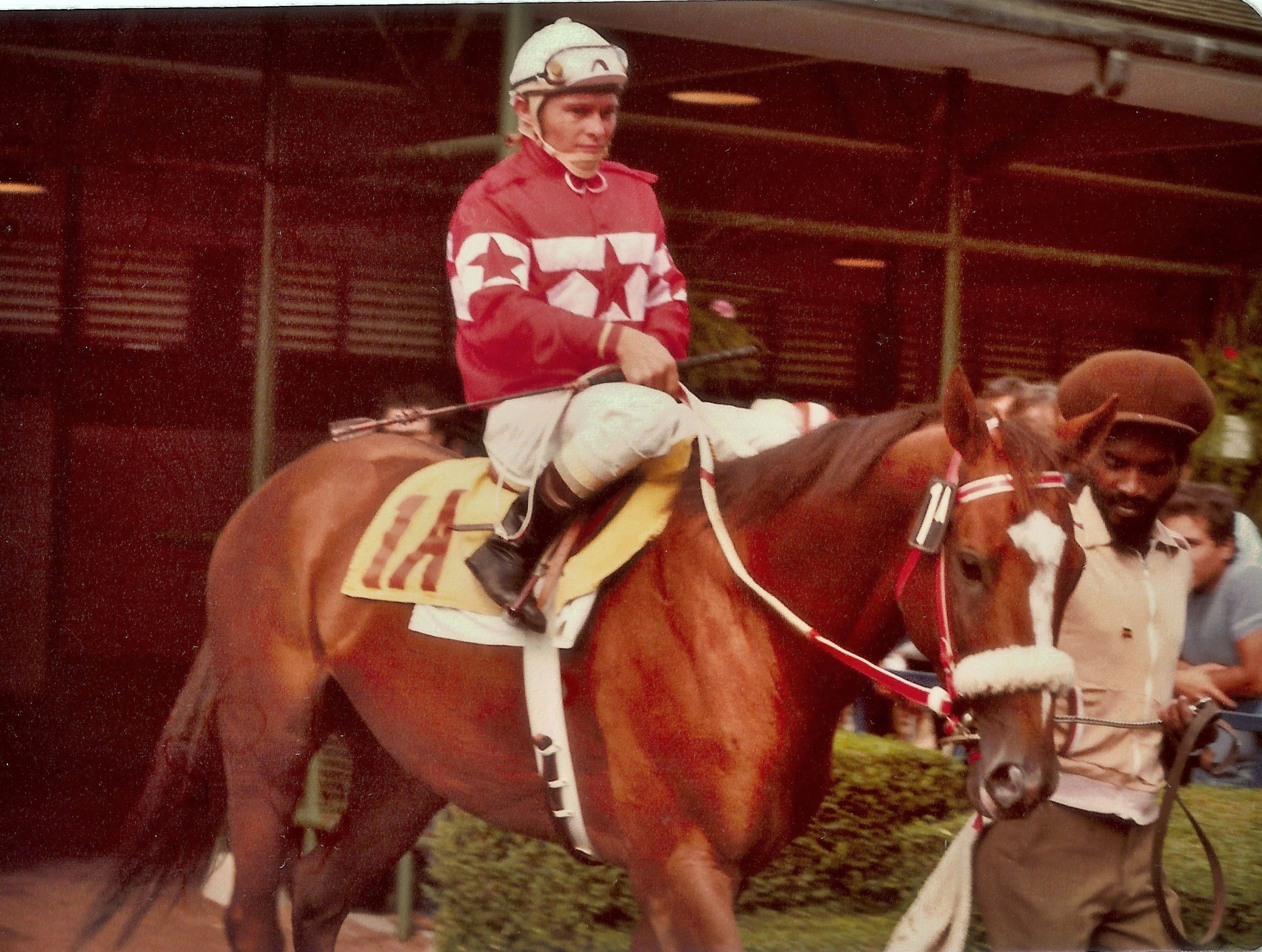
- Overskate and Jockey Robin Platts at Woodbine Racetrack, 1980

Personal information
- Born: c.1949 Leicester, England
- Occupation: Jockey

Horse racing career
- Sport: Horse racing
- Career wins: 3,244

Major racing wins
- Canadian International Stakes (1968); Connaught Cup Stakes (1968, 1969, 1975, 1976, 1978, 1979, 1988, 1992); Eclipse Handicap (1968, 1971, 1975, 1977, 1980, 1982, 1983); E. P. Taylor Stakes (1968, 1980); Seaway Stakes (1968, 1972, 1979, 1981, 1984, 1985); Swynford Stakes (1968, 1971, 1976, 1978, 1992); Autumn Stakes (1972, 1978, 1980); Grey Stakes (1973, 1980); Nearctic Stakes (1973, 1974, 1975, 1979); Jockey Club Cup Handicap (1974, 1975, 1980, 1981); Plate Trial Stakes (1974, 1975, 1976, 1978, 1980); Canadian Stakes (1975, 1982, 1983, 1984, 1986); Summer Stakes (1975, 1976, 1981, 1982, 1983, 1988); Arlington Handicap (1976); Coronation Futurity Stakes (1977, 1980, 1983); Sir Barton Stakes (1977, 1986); Manitoba Derby (1978, 1986); Display Stakes (1979, 1983, 1996); Dominion Day Stakes (1981, 1983, 1990); Toronto Cup Stakes (1983, 1988, 1989) Canadian Classic Race wins: Queen's Plate (1972, 1974, 1977, 1984); Prince of Wales Stakes (1978, 1981, 1982); Breeders' Stakes (1974, 1978, 1982, 1983) International race wins: Arlington Handicap (1976); Bowling Green Handicap (1979); Stars and Stripes Turf Handicap (1979); Laurance Armour Handicap (1980); Spinster Stakes (1981); Maker's Mark Mile Stakes (1990); Gulfstream Park Handicap (1991); Donn Handicap (1991); Prioress Stakes (1995)

Racing awards
- Sovereign Award for Outstanding Jockey (1979); Avelino Gomez Memorial Award (1992)

Honours
- Canadian Horse Racing Hall of Fame (1997)

Significant horses
- Ice Water, Runaway Groom, Glorious Song; Overskate, Play The King, Izvestia; Charlie Barley, Carotene, Norcliffe

Robin Platts (born c. 1949 in Leicester, England) is a Canadian thoroughbred horse racing Hall of Fame jockey. He began his jockey career at age 16 and went on to become the winner of the 1979 Sovereign Award for Outstanding Jockey, a record four-time winner of Canada's most prestigious horse race, the Queen's Plate, and the recipient of the 1992 Avelino Gomez Memorial Award.

Robin Platts retired at age 51 in 2000 with 3,244 wins, including more than 250 stakes race victories. In 1997 he was inducted into the Canadian Horse Racing Hall of Fame and today has been working as a jockey agent. In 2024 she was inducted into the Caledon Sports Hall of Fame.
