= Emile Ramsammy =

Trinidad and Tobago jockey (born 1962)

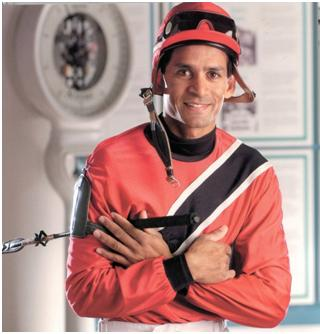

Personal information
- Born: 11 December 1962 (age 63) Trinidad, Trinidad and Tobago
- Occupation: Jockey

Horse racing career
- Sport: Horse racing
- Career wins: 2005+ (ongoing)

Major racing wins
- Barbados Gold Cup (1985, 1987, 1988); Princess Elizabeth Stakes (1994, 2004); Eclipse Stakes (1995); Sir Barton Stakes (1995, 2001); Swynford Stakes (1995, 1999, 2000); Wonder Where Stakes (1995, 2003); Toronto Cup Stakes (1997); New Providence Stakes (1997, 2004); Vandal Stakes (1997); Baldwin Stakes (1999); Col. R. S. McLaughlin Stakes (1999); Nearctic Stakes (1999); Connaught Cup Stakes (2000, 2001); Coronation Futurity Stakes (2000); Deputy Minister Stakes (2000, 2001, 2002); Display Stakes (2000); Victoria Stakes (2000); Bison City Stakes (2001); Bull Page Stakes (2001); Clarendon Stakes (2002); Highlander Handicap (2002); Jacques Cartier Stakes (2002); Vigil Stakes (2002, 2003, 2008); Royal North Stakes (2002, 2007); Maple Leaf Stakes (2003, 2004); Seagram Cup Stakes (2003, 2004, 2005); Vice Regent Stakes (2003, 2005); Turf Paradise Derby (2004); Natalma Stakes (2004, 2006); Dance Smartly Stakes (2005); Overskate Stakes (2005, 2006); Nijinsky Stakes (2007); Hill 'n' Dale Stakes (2007); Star Shoot Stakes (2008); Selene Stakes (2007, 2008); Marine Stakes (2008); Frost King Stakes (2009); Mazarine Stakes (2010) Canadian Classic Race wins: Queen's Plate (1996, 2006)

Racing awards
- Barbadian Champion jockey by wins (1986, 1989); Sovereign Award for Outstanding Jockey (1996, 1997); Avelino Gomez Memorial Award (2011)

Emile Ramsammy (born December 11, 1962, in Trinidad, Trinidad and Tobago) is a Canadian thoroughbred horse racing Champion jockey. He had more than 500 victories racing in the Caribbean before emigrating to Canada in the early 1990s.

Ramsammy has won a number of important graded stakes races in Canada including the 1996 and 2006 Queen's Plate, the country's most prestigious race. He was voted the 1996 and 1997 Sovereign Award for Outstanding Jockey in Canada. In 2011 he won the Avelino Gomez Memorial Award for his contributions to the sport of Thoroughbred racing in Canada.

| Chart (2000–present) | Peak position |
|---|---|
| National Earnings List for Jockeys 2000 | 39 |
| National Earnings List for Jockeys 2001 | 27 |
| National Earnings List for Jockeys 2002 | 25 |
| National Earnings List for Jockeys 2003 | 23 |
| National Earnings List for Jockeys 2004 | 30 |
| National Earnings List for Jockeys 2005 | 54 |
| National Earnings List for Jockeys 2006 | 58 |
| National Earnings List for Jockeys 2007 | 42 |
| National Earnings List for Jockeys 2008 | 44 |
| National Earnings List for Jockeys 2009 | 42 |
| National Earnings List for Jockeys 2010 | 41 |
| National Earnings List for Jockeys 2011 | 78 |
