= Greenwood Raceway =

Horse racing facility in Toronto, Ontario

Greenwood (originally Woodbine)
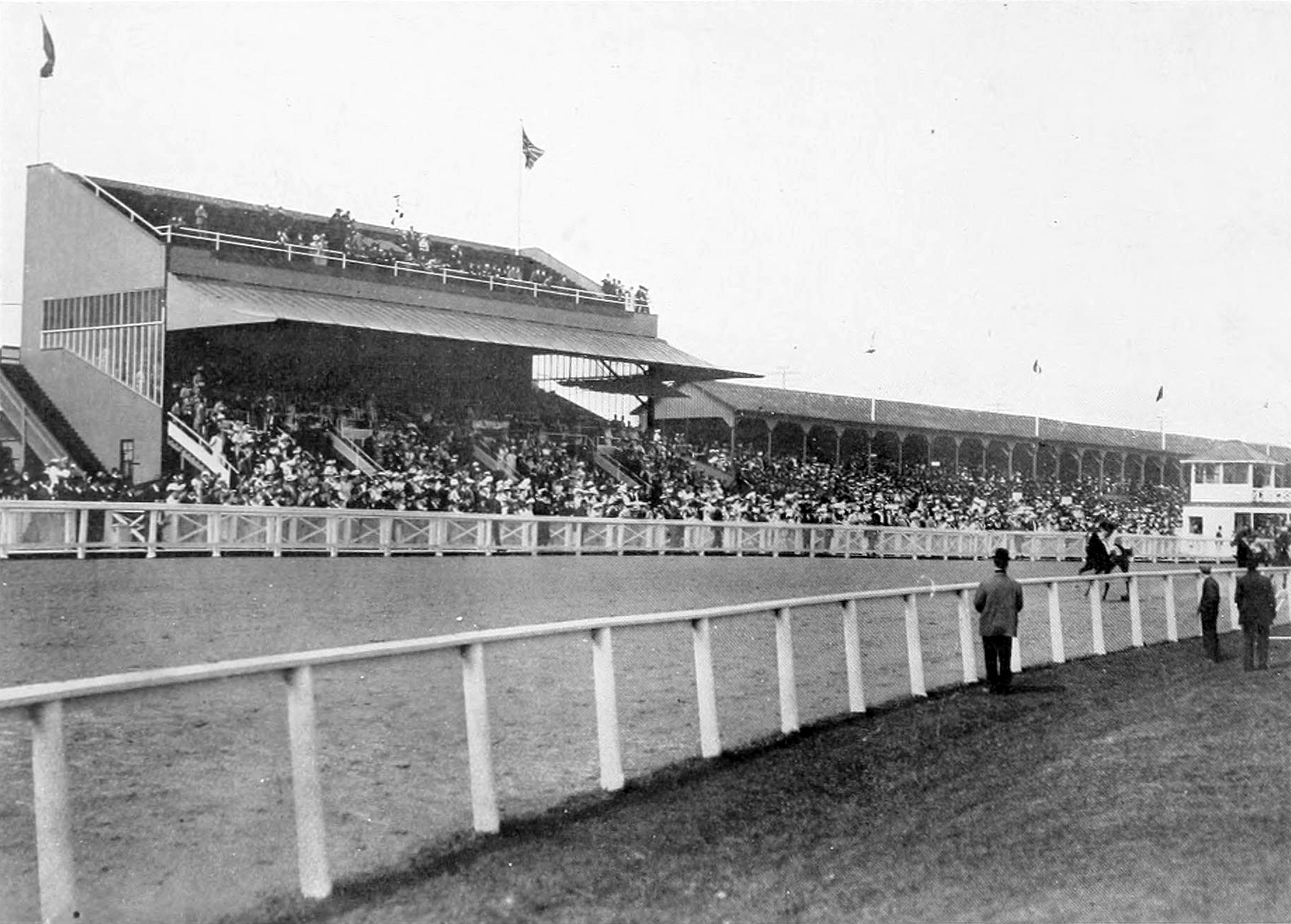
- The racetrack in 1909
- Interactive map of Greenwood (originally Woodbine)
- Location: Toronto, Ontario, Canada
- Coordinates: 43°40′N 79°18.7′W
- Owned by: Ontario Jockey Club
- Date opened: 1874
- Date closed: 1993
- Course type: Flat

Greenwood Raceway (originally Woodbine Race Course) was a horse racing facility in Toronto, Ontario, Canada.

== History ==
=== Woodbine Race Course ===
Inaugurated in 1874 as Woodbine Race Course at the foot of Woodbine Avenue and Lake Ontario, it was owned and operated by Raymond Pardee and William J. "Jiggs" Howell. The facility's land was mostly owned by Jesse Ashbridge and C. C. Small. Within a few years, financial problems resulted in the property reverting to Joseph Duggan, the original landowner and retired innkeeper. In 1881, Duggan helped found the Ontario Jockey Club (OJC). The facility hosted seasonal harness racing for Standardbred horses and flat racing events for Thoroughbreds.

Harness racing dates were transferred to the racetrack from Thorncliffe Park Raceway to fill the gap between the spring and fall thoroughbred meets, and the track was known as Greenwood Raceway during the harness meets. The track was at the junction of Kingston Road and Queen Street East, with only a narrow strip of land between it and Lake Ontario. Thoroughbred racing continued at the racetrack on a shortened six-furlong (1,207 m) track. Harness races were at first conducted on the Thoroughbred track, but serious problems with mud (including the starting gate being immobilized) led to the construction of a five-furlong (1006 m) stone dust harness track inside the Thoroughbred track. This track was known for its tight turns and long back and homestretches.

In the early 1950s, the Ontario Jockey Club, led by directors E. P. Taylor, George C. Hendrie, and J. E. Frowde Seagram, undertook an acquisition and consolidation program for southern Ontario racing. The OJC bought and closed the Orpen-owned Dufferin Park and Long Branch race tracks. By 1956, the OJC operated just three facilities, consisting of the Fort Erie Racetrack in Fort Erie, Ontario, and two facilities in Toronto. A new facility for Thoroughbred horse races was constructed in Etobicoke and given the name Woodbine Racetrack.

=== Greenwood Raceway ===
The old facility was completely renovated and renamed Greenwood Raceway in 1963. It held both harness racing and Thoroughbred racing meets until its closure at the end of 1993. Steeplechase races were held at Woodbine/Greenwood for a few years, and there was a Thoroughbred race announcer by the name of Foster "Buck" Dryden for several years.

A horse by the name of Last Mark (owned by James G. Fair of Cainsville, Ontario) won the "Plate" in 1948, setting a new Plate record and only being equalled once before the track was decommissioned. R. J. Speers's horse, Lord Fairmond, came second in that Plate race. Fair had two horses in that Plate which never ran in the Plate Trials but worked out between the two divisions of the Trials. Their times were faster than the times of either of the trial divisions.

Greenwood Raceway was the site of the Canadian Pacing Derby, the North America Cup, the Fan Hanover Stakes, the Maple Leaf Trot, and the Canadian Trotting Classic.

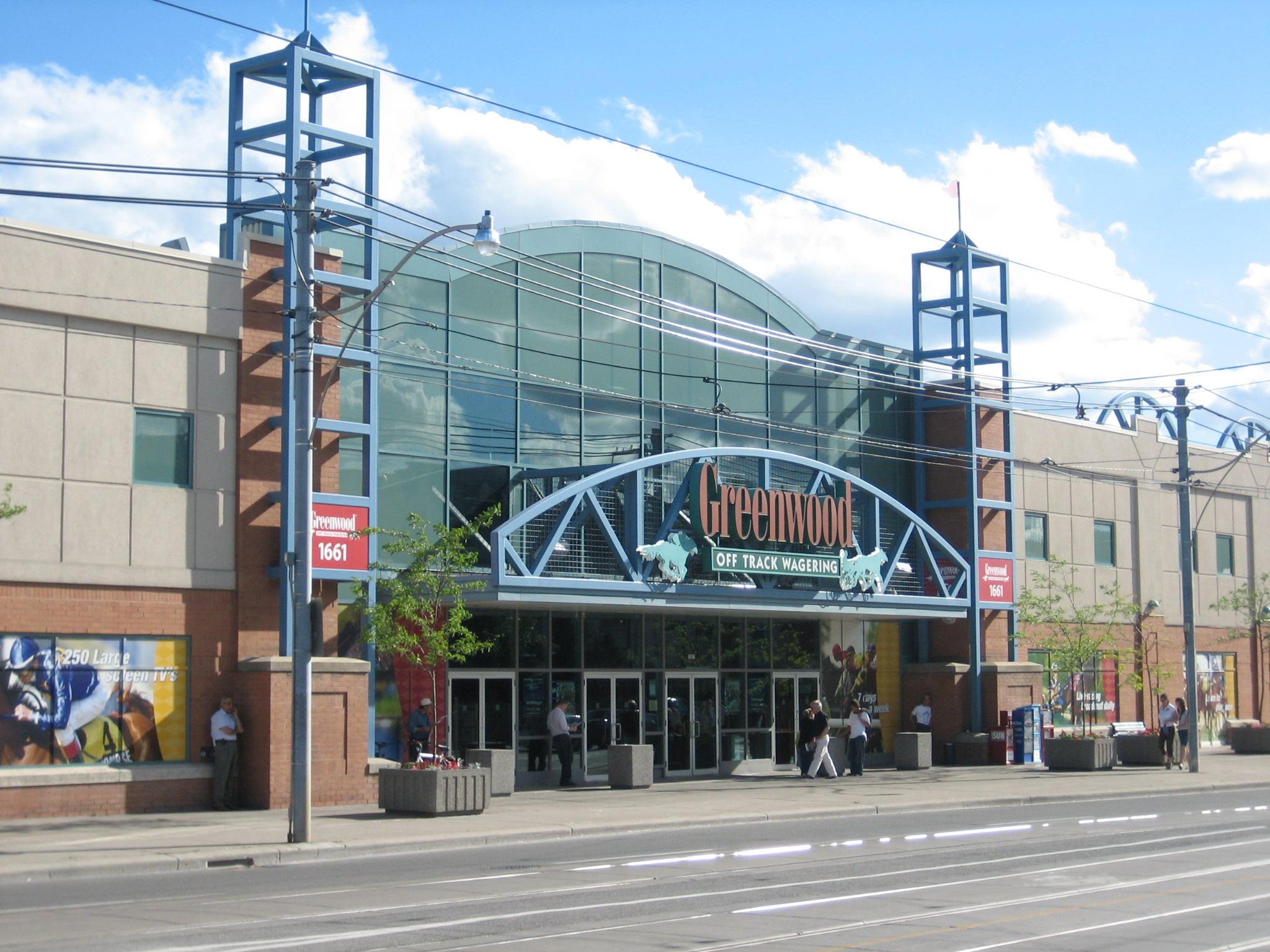
Greenwood Off Track Wagering was erected to replace the raceway

In 1994, the Thoroughbred and harness operations were moved to Woodbine Racetrack in Etobicoke. The stadium was demolished and replaced by residential and commercial development, including a betting parlour. To commemorate the history of the site, two of the new residential roadways were given names that reflected horse racing themes: Northern Dancer Blvd. (in honour of the famous thoroughbred Northern Dancer) and Winners Circle. Joseph Duggan Road was named after the historical landowner.

=== Woodbine Park ===
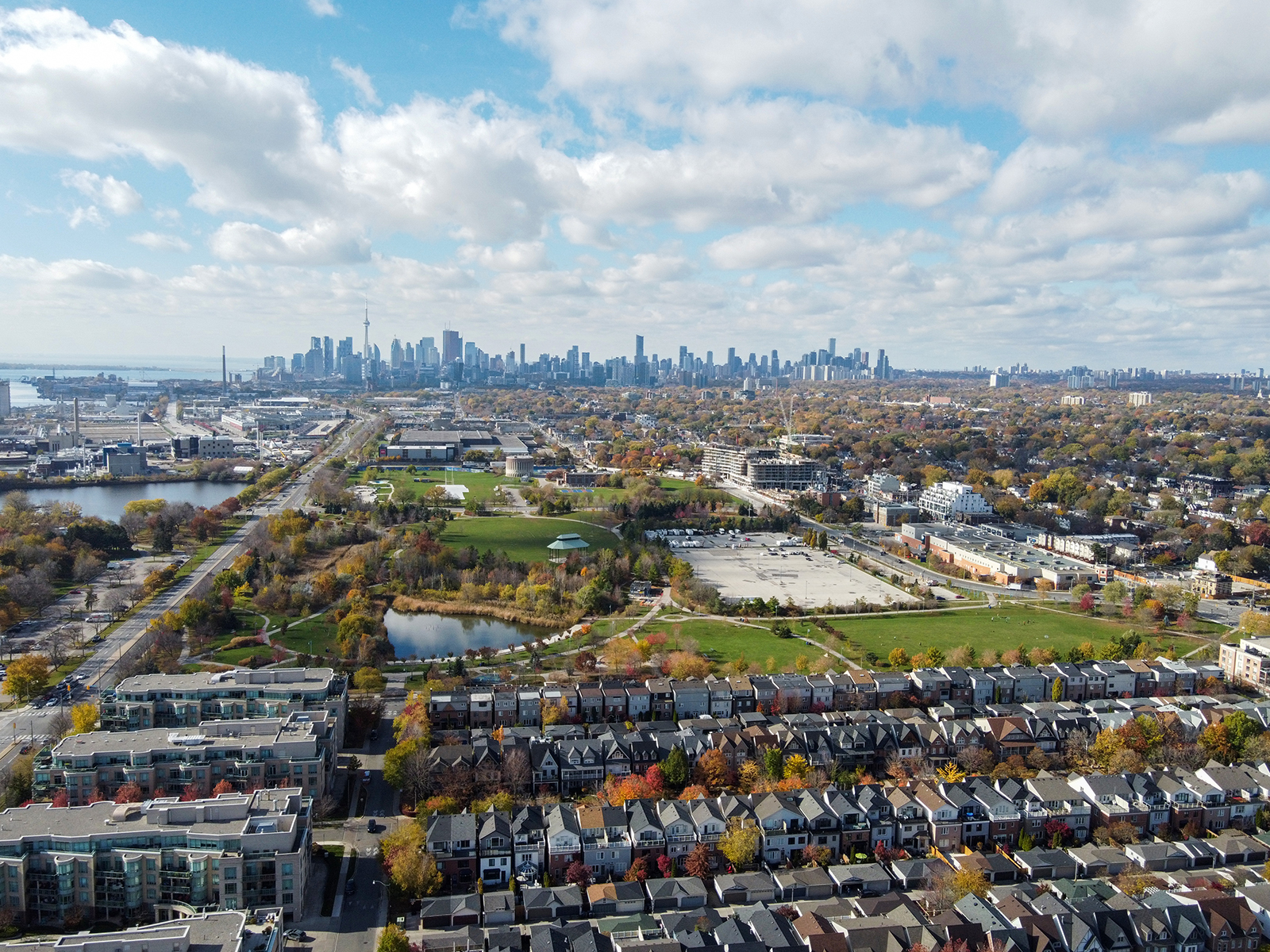
Aerial view of Woodbine Park in 2023

The southern half of the property became Woodbine Park with a water fountain feature in a man-made pond. It is separated from Woodbine Beach by Lake Shore Boulevard.

=== Greenwood Off Track Wagering ===
In 2016, it was announced that Live Nation Entertainment had purchased the other half of the property (known as Greenwood Off Track Wagering or Champions Greenwood) with the intent of repurposing the site into a medium-sized entertainment venue with a capacity of 2,700 attendees.

== See also ==
- W. A. Hewitt, patrol judge at Woodbine Race Course and steward of the Incorporated Canadian Racing Association
