= Durham Cup Stakes =

- Class: Grade III
- Location: Woodbine Racetrack; Toronto, Ontario, Canada
- Inaugurated: 1906
- Race type: Thoroughbred - Flat racing
- Website: www.woodbineentertainment.com/qct/default.asp

Race information
- Distance: 1 1/16 miles (8.5 furlongs)
- Surface: Tapeta synthetic dirt
- Track: left-handed
- Qualification: Three-years-old & up
- Weight: Assigned
- Purse: Can$150,000 (since 2007)

The Durham Cup Stakes is a Thoroughbred horse race run annually at Woodbine Racetrack in Toronto, Ontario, Canada. Run in mid October, the Grade III race is open to horses age three and older. Raced over a distance of 1 1/8 miles on Tapeta synthetic dirt, it currently offers a current purse of Can$150,000.

The race was first run in 1906 as the Durham Cup Handicap at Old Woodbine Racetrack. It remained there until the track was closed and replaced by the new Woodbine racetrack. Since inception it has been contested at various distances:

- 1 3/4 miles : 1906-1951
- 1 1/4 miles : 1952-1979
- 1 1/8 miles : 1980–2019
- 1 ^{1}/_{16}

In 1992, Francine Villeneuve became the first female jockey to win the race.

== Records ==
Speed record: (Through 1998, Woodbine times were recorded in fifths of a second. Since 1999 they are in hundredths of a second)

- On Synthetic dirt surface:
  - 1:40.73 - Who's the Star (2022)
- On natural dirt:
  - 1:48.58 - Deputy Inxs (1999)

Most wins:

- 3 - Basqueian (1994, 1995, 1996)

Most wins by an owner:

- 4 - Joseph E. Seagram (1906, 1908, 1909, 1910)
- 4 - Seagram Stable (1926, 1928, 1929, 1932)
- 4 - Windfields Farm (1962, 1966, 1971, 1973)

Most wins by a jockey:

- 5 - Emma-Jayne Wilson (2006, 2011, 2015, 2022, 2023)
- 5 - Patrick Husbands (2009, 2012, 2013, 2019, 2020)

Most wins by a trainer:

- 6 - Roger Attfield (1987, 1989, 1990, 2001, 2008, 2016)

== Winners ==
Year	Winner	Age	Jockey	Trainer	Owner	Time
2026	William T	4	Fraser Aebly	Donald C. MacRae	Michael Lay	1:42.54
2025	Cool Kiss	5	Sahin Civaci	Martin Drexler	Stephen Chesney and Cory S. Hoffman	1:42.74
2024	Dresden Row	3	Ryan Munger	Lorne Richards	True North Stable and Bloom Racing Stable (Jeffery Bloom)	1:42.04
2023	Artie’s Storm	5	Emma-Jayne Wilson	Paul M. Buttigieg	Buttigieg Training Centre	1:40.08
2022	Who's the Star	4	Emma-Jayne Wilson	Mark Casse	M Racing Group	1:40.73
2021	Special Forces	6	Justin Stein	Kevin Attard	Soli Mehta & Partner	1:42.36
2020	Salute With Honor	4	Patrick Husbands	Mark Casse	Live Oak Plantation	1:42.35
2019	The Great Day	4	Patrick Husbands	Arnaud Delacour	Lael Stable	1:49.68
2018	Lookin At Eight	4	Jerome Lermyte	Mark Casse	Barber, Oxley et al	1:50.55
2017	Melmich	6	Eurico Rosa da Silva	Kevin Attard	Chesney & Hoffman	1:49.86
2016	Are You Kidding Me	6	Alan Garcia	Roger Attfield	Kirk/Bates/Riordan	1:49.10
2015	Golden Sabre	5	Emma-Jayne Wilson	Malcolm Pierce	Sam-Son Farm	1:48.33
2014	Lukes Alley	4	Luis Contreras	Josie Carroll	Melnyk Racing Stables	1:49.23
2013	James Street	6	Patrick Husbands	Josie Carroll	Melnyk Racing Stables	1:50.14
2012	Delegation	3	Patrick Husbands	Mark E. Casse	Gary Barber	1:50.60
2011	City Wolf	4	Emma-Jayne Wilson	Reade Baker	Stronach Stables	1:50.38
2010	Southdale	4	Jim McAleney	Ian Black	Roderick Ferguson	1:51.36
2009	Pool Play	4	Patrick Husbands	Mark E. Casse	William S. Farish IV	1:49.24
2008	Palladio	6	Richard Dos Ramos	Roger Attfield	Haras S. M. de Araras	1:49.29
2007	Leonnatus Anteas	3	Jono Jones	Kevin Attard	Knob Hill Stable	1:49.55
2006	Barracuda Boy	5	Emma-Jayne Wilson	Nick Gonzalez	Stronach Stable	1:50.49
2005	Cryptograph	4	Todd Kabel	Malcolm Pierce	Pin Oak Stable	1:52.51
2004	Norfolk Knight	5	Jillian Scharfstein	Hugo Dittfach	Margaret Squires	1:51.56
2003	Parose	9	Jono Jones	Alexander McPherson	John Atto	1:53.16
2002	Dream Launcher	4	Richard Dos Ramos	Audre Cappuccitti	Audre Cappuccitti	1:52.45
2001	A Fleets Dancer	6	Robert Landry	Roger Attfield	Cam Allard	1:51.71
2000	Kiss A Native	3	Mickey Walls	David R. Bell	Stronach Stable	1:49.58
1999	Deputy Inxs	8	Na Somsanith	Audre Cappuccitti	A. & G. Cappuccitti	1:48.58
1998	Northern Sky	6	Laurie Gulas	Michael Keogh	Gus Schickedanz	1:51.80
1997	Northern Sky	5	Laurie Gulas	Michael Keogh	Gus Schickedanz	1:49.20
1996	Basqueian	5	Todd Kabel	Daniel J. Vella	Frank Stronach	1:51.60
1995	Basqueian	4	Todd Kabel	Daniel J. Vella	Frank Stronach	1:51.20
1994	Basqueian	3	Shane Sellers	Daniel J. Vella	Frank Stronach	1:50.40
1993	Benburb	4	Richard Dos Ramos	Phil England	Knob Hill Stable	1:50.40
1992	Twist The Snow	6	Francine Villeneuve	Angus McArthur	Angus McArthur	1:51.40
1991	Candid Cameron	4	Dave Penna	Trevor Swan	J. D. Cameron	1:52.20
1990	Take Account †	4	Don Seymour	Roger Attfield	Kinghaven Farms	1:50.80
1990	Imperial Colony †	5	Robin Platts	Roger Attfield	Kinghaven Farms	1:50.80
1989	Steady Power	5	Don Seymour	Roger Attfield	Kinghaven Farms	1:51.00
1988	Steady Zephyr	4	Ray Sabourin	Michael Tammaro	Bayshore Racing	1:51.80
1987	Triple Wow	4	Don Seymour	Roger Attfield	Kinghaven Farms	1:52.60
1986	Key to the Moon	5	Lloyd Duffy	Gil Rowntree	B. K. Y. Stable	1:50.00
1985	Ten Gold Pots	4	Dan Beckon	Gil Rowntree	B. K. Y. Stable	1:50.40
1984	Pax Nobiscum	4	Dan Beckon	Grant Pearce	Kingfield Farm	1:52.80
1983	Jacksboro	4	Larry Attard	Tony Mattine	Nelson Bunker Hunt	1:51.40
1982	Le Grand Seigneur	4	Dan Beckon	Yonnie Starr	Jean-Louis Levesque	1:51.80
1981	Driving Home	4	Robin Platts	Glenn Magnusson	C.F.C.W. Racing	1:52.20
1980	Foreign Control	5	George HoSang	Gilbert H. Robillard	B. C. Stable	1:49.60
1979	Foreign Control	4	George HoSang	Gilbert H. Robillard	Gardiner & B. C. Stable	2:04.60
1978	Lucky Conn	5	J. Paul Souter	Donnie Walker	Conn Smythe	2:02.80
1977	Hopeful Answer	4	Gary Stahlbaum	Frank Merrill, Jr.	W. Preston Gilbride	2:02.40
1976	Brilliant Sandy	4	Lloyd Duffy	Jerry C. Meyer	Smith/Willow Downs	2:04.20
1975	Butterbump	4	Brian Swatuk	Frank H. Merrill, Jr.	Viscount Hardinge	2:10.20
1974	Fabiusand	4	L. Buzit	Jerry G. Lavigne	Parkview Stable	2:03.40
1973	Minsky	5	Sandy Hawley	Roy Johnson	Windfields Farm	2:03.00
1972	Twice Lucky	5	Avelino Gomez	Donnie Walker	Conn Smythe	2:10.00
1971	Minsky	3	Sandy Hawley	Sidney Watters, Jr.	Windfields Farm	2:02.20
1970	Dance Act	4	Richard Armstrong	Larry Grant	Green Hills Farm	2:03.40
1969	Battling	5	Lloyd Duffy	J. Moir, Jr.	L. J. Hempel	2:03.20
1968	Hammer Kopf	4	Richard Grubb	Fred H. Loschke	Fred H. Loschke	2:07.20
1967	He's A Smoothie	4	Avelino Gomez	Warren Beasley	William R. Beasley	2:04.60
1966	Victorian Era	4	Avelino Gomez	Lou Cavalaris, Jr.	Windfields Farm	2:02.60
1965	Langcrest	4	Sam McComb	Edward Mann	Sidney J. Langill	2:02.20
1964	Judo King	3	Hugo Dittfach	J. Lankinen	B. J. Thibodeau	2:03.80
1963	Already Dia	4	Richard Armstrong	W. Trevenew	P. J. Rock	2:03.20
1962	Choperion	3	James Fitzsimmons	Horatio Luro	Windfields Farm	2:02.40
1961	Hidden Treasure	4	Pat Remillard	Robert S. Bateman	Bill Beasley	2:02.60
1960	Windy Ship	3	Charles Boland	S. Couch	Emcee Stable	2:07.40
1959	Ali's Pride	5	Norm Leid	A. H. Routcliffe	Pine Tree Stable	2:10.20
1958	Our Sirdar	4	Al Coy	Red Barnard	Shermanor Farms	2:05.20
1957	Hartney	6	C. O'Brien	Patrick MacMurchy	K. R. Marshall	2:12.00
1956	Lawday	3	Hiromi Uyeyama	John J. Thorpe	J. E. Frowde Seagram	2:04.00
1955	Ace Marine	3	George Walker	Yonnie Starr	Larkin Maloney	2:05.20
1954	Queen's Own	3	T. Johnson	Gordon J. McCann	E. P. Taylor	2:04.00
1953	Chain Reaction	3	Bud Giacomelli	Richard Townrow	Mrs. Elodie Tomlinson	2:03.20
1952	Bennington	3	Jose Vina	John Passero	William R. Beasley	2:05.40
1951	no race					
1950	Lady's Lover	3	R. Buisson	Frank Merrill, Jr.	Frank Merrill, Jr.	3:00.40
1949	Moldy	5	J. Stewart	Arthur Brent	Parkwood Stable	3:04.00
1948	North York	6	Alf Bavington	Morris Fishman	H. Lahman	3:09.00
1947	Palermo	4	J. Dewhurst	R. Anderson	D. J. Kennedy	3:01.40
1946	no race					
1945	Broom Time	4	Chris Rogers	T. Frost	J. E. Frost	3:01.00
1944	Maginot Line	5	Bobby Watson	G. Hay	L. H. Appleby	3:02.00
1943	Teeworth	5	R. Leavitt	N. Northwood	N. Northwood	3:03.60
1942	Attrisius	4	Henry Palaez	J. Smith	Riverdale Stable	3:05.20
1941	Curwen	4	Bobby Watson	Loyd Gentry, Sr.	Harry C. Hatch	3:10.00
1940	Sea General	4	C. W. Smith	Harry Giddings, Jr.	Harry Giddings, Sr.	3:00.00
1939	Donosiris	5	Albert Schmidl	Frank Gilpin	Parkwood Stable	3:07.00
1938	Hainault Maid	4	Aalbert Schmidl	A. Robinson	T. F. Montague	3:04.00
1937	Monsweep	4	Charlie McTague	William H. Bringloe	Harry C. Hatch	3:05.20
1936	Royal Vintage	6	Frank Dougherty	A. Sansone	M. J. Sansone	3:00.60
1935	Donstick	3	S. Young	William H. Bringloe	Harry C. Hatch	3:03.20
1934	Shady Well	5	Pat Remillard	John J. Thorpe	Edward F. Seagram	3:04.80
1933	Shady Well	4	Tommy Luther	John J. Thorpe	Edward F. Seagram	3:03.20
1932	Shady Well	3	Eddie Legere	William H. Bringloe	Seagram Stable	3:02.60
1931	Pat Gaiety	4	A. Ridgway	C. McKee	T. M. Glassco	3:03.60
1930	Lindsay	4	Frankie Mann	J. Given	J. C. Fletcher	3:04.80
1929	Beau of the West	8	Whitey Abel	John Whyte	Seagram Stable	3:03.40
1928	Beau of the West	7	Lester Pichon	William Donohue	Seagram Stable	3:05.60
1927	Cloth Hall	5	John Maiben	E. Doyle	T. Riddell	3:01.60
1926	Duchess	4	H. Erickson	William H. Bringloe	Seagram Stable	3:03.60
1925	Thorndyke	4	Ovila Bourassa	F. Hynes	Thorncliffe Stable	3:06.60
1924	Procyon	5	H. Thomas	John O. Burttschell	P. G. Christopher	3:05.20
1923	Hallucination	3	Pete Walls	Henry McDaniel	J. K. L. Ross	3:02.00
1922	Procyon	3	Mark Fator	W. Martin	P. G. Christopher	3:00.00
1921	Woodbine	4	Merritt C. Buxton	G. Walker	Brookdale Stable	3:03.60
1920	Bugle March	4	Harold Thurber	Edward A. Steeds	T. Riddell	3:09.00
1919	no race					
1918	no race					
1917	no race					
1916	Copper King	3	Ted Rice	M. Gorman	P. Gorman	3:03.00
1915	Fair Montague	3	John Callahan	John Nixon	C. Miller	3:02.60
1914	Prince Philsthorpe	5	J. Metcalfe	C. Hanson	Capital City Stable	3:09.40
1913	Hearts of Oak	3	Charley Peak	Harry Giddings, Jr.	Harry Giddings, Sr.	3:05.20
1912	Calumny	3	D. McCarthy	J. D. Gorman	J. D. Gorman	3:07.00
1911	Denham	7	Charley Peak	Thomas J. Healey	Valley Farm Stable	3:10.60
1910	Seismic	5	Phil Musgrave	Barry Littlefield	Joseph E. Seagram	3:10.60
1909	Seismic	4	Phil Musgrave	Barry Littlefield	Joseph E. Seagram	3:05.60
1908	Inferno	6	Phil Musgrave	Barry Littlefield	Joseph E. Seagram	3:06.20
1907	Kelpie	3	W. Mulcahy	John Nixon	Valley Farm Stable	3:05.80
1906	Inferno	4	Ted Koerner	Barry Littlefield	Joseph E. Seagram	3:02.00

* In 1990 there was a dead heat for first.

== See also ==
- List of Canadian flat horse races
