= William H. Bringloe =

Canadian horse trainer

William Bringloe
Personal information
- Born: July 15, 1875 Compton, Quebec, Canada
- Died: December 30, 1937 (aged 62) San Francisco, California, USA
- Occupation: Racehorse trainer

Horse racing career
- Sport: Horse racing

Major racing wins
- Canadian Sportsman's Handicap (1921, 1922); Hamilton Derby (1921, 1925); Seagram Cup Handicap (1921, 1925, 1928); Jockey Club Cup Handicap (1922, 1928, 1931); King Edward Stakes (1922, 1926, 1929); Toronto Cup Handicap (1922, 1924); Coronation Futurity Stakes (1923, 1925, 1927, 1935); Woodstock Stakes (1924, 1928); Connaught Cup Stakes (1925, 1929, 1932); Hamilton Cup Handicap (1925, 1926); Victoria Stakes (1925); Autumn Stakes (1926, 1928); Durham Cup Stakes (1926, 1932, 1935, 1937); Philadelphia Handicap (1926); Windsor Hotel Cup Handicap (1926, 1927); American National Rush Handicap (1928); Grey Stakes (1928, 1930, 1932); Rennert Handicap (1928); A. B. Dade Memorial Handicap (1929); Clarendon Stakes (1929, 1930, 1931); Long Branch Handicap (1931); Maple Leaf Stakes (1932, 1935); Manitoba Derby (1936); William Hendrie Memorial Handicap (1936); Cup and Saucer Stakes (1937); Canadian Classic race wins: Breeders' Stakes (1928, 1929); Queen's Plate (1923, 1926, 1928, 1933, 1936, 1937)

Racing awards
- Canadian Champion Thoroughbred Trainer by earnings (1927); U.S. Champion trainer by earnings (1927)

Honours
- Canadian Horse Racing Hall of Fame (2000)

Significant horses
- Display, Flowerful, Goldlure, Haplite, King O'Connor, Monsweep, Shady Well, Sir Harry, Young Kitty

William Henry Bringloe (July 15, 1875 – December 30, 1937) was a trainer of Thoroughbred racehorses who was the 1927 Canadian and United States Champion trainer by earnings and a Canadian Horse Racing Hall of Fame inductee.

== Background ==
A native of Compton, Quebec, Bringloe's father was a groom and coachman and as such young William grew up around horses. By 1901 he was living in Oxford County East, Ontario where he was working as a foreman at a horse stable.

== Training career ==
In 1918 William Bringloe was hired as head trainer for the stable of distillery magnate Joseph Seagram. At the time it was the most important racing operation in Canada and Bringloe would train runners for flat races as well as some steeplechasers. However, Joseph Seagram died a year later and his sons Edward, Norman and Thomas continued racing under the Seagram Stables name. Bringloe was a six-time winner of Canada's most prestigious race, the King's Plate, four of which were for the Seagram Stables and two for another major distiller, Harry Hatch.

While training for the Seagram Stables, William Bringloe usually wintered some of the stable's horses in Maryland in the care of an assistant trainer. When racing opened in the late spring, Bringloe would take over the stable and compete at American tracks until returning to Canada for the important races of the summer and fall meets.

William Bringloe had three starters in the Preakness Stakes, the second leg of the U.S. Triple Crown series. His best results were a second with Sir Harry in 1927 and a third in 1928 with Solace.

== U.S. Customs arrest William Bringloe and seize 15 horses ==
The Daily Racing Form of March 17, 1917 reported that on March 16, U.S. Custom Officials at the Buffalo, New York International Railway Bridge border crossing had discovered several cases of whiskey hidden in the railcars carrying fifteen racehorses owned by the Seagram Stable which were coming from Waterloo, Ontario to Maryland. By virtue of a constitutional amendment, alcohol Prohibition was in effect throughout the United States and trainer William Bringloe was arrested. Arraigned before a Federal Commissioner, the well-known trainer answered the indictment by declaring it was necessary to give a racehorse whisky while in training. Bringloe was released after posting a bail bond of $1,000.

Maryland racing officials and fellow horsemen responded immediately, lending their support for Bringloe's claim. Calling the action by Federal Officials an "absurdity," Pimlico veterinarian Dr. John William Spranklin asserted that "whisky used to be regarded as necessary in the treatment of horses" and that "there are a number of diseases from which horses suffer where whisky always has been and always will be known to the fraternity as one of the main agents administered in connection with certain drugs because of its stimulating qualities." William P. Riggs, secretary of the Maryland Jockey Club, declared the veterinarian's statement to be true, as did Major Ral Parr, a stable owner whose horse had won the 1920 Kentucky Derby and whose knowledge of horses resulted in his being "commandeered" by the government during World War I.

All this support did little to alleviate the problem and in the end William Bringloe was fined $250 by a U.S. Federal judge for illegally importing liquor. Immigration officers then charged Bringloe with entering the country unlawfully but this charge was not pressed. Nonetheless, on his return to Canada, a court in Bridgeburg, Ontario fined him $300 for illegally transporting liquor to the U.S. border.

The consumption of alcohol is seen as an integral part of St. Patrick's Day celebrations held annually on March 17. The day following Bringloe's arrest, the usual St. Patrick's Day crowd of celebrating owners and others at the Havre de Grace Racetrack stable area had little to cheer about even though Boniface won the Philadelphia Handicap. The horse's Canadian owner, J. K. L. Ross, had brought no whisky with him to treat the horses.

== Death and Honors ==
While at Tanforan Racetrack in San Bruno, California with a stable of horses for Harry Hatch, Bringloe took seriously ill and died a few days later in a San Francisco hospital. His remains were returned to Canada and interred in the St. John's Norway Cemetery in the Toronto neighbourhood, The Beaches.

In its posthumous biography, the Canadian Horse Racing Hall of Fame called Bringloe "one of Canada's most respected trainers during the 1920s and '30s."
