= King Edward Stakes =

- Class: Grade II
- Location: Woodbine Racetrack; Toronto, Ontario, Canada
- Race type: Thoroughbred - Flat racing
- Website: www.woodbineentertainment.com

Race information
- Distance: 1 mile (8 furlongs)
- Surface: Turf
- Track: Left-handed
- Qualification: Three-year-olds & up
- Weight: Assigned
- Purse: CAD$200,000

The King Edward Stakes is a Canadian Thoroughbred horse race run annually at Woodbine Racetrack in Toronto, Ontario. The Grade II turf race is open to horses aged three and older and is raced over a distance of one mile (8 furlongs). Run in late June or early July, it currently offers a purse of CAD$200,000.

Named for Edward VII of the United Kingdom who had been crowned king in 1901, the race was created the following year with its first running taking place in 1903 as the King Edward Gold Cup. It was raced on dirt at the Old Woodbine Park until 1958 when it was moved to Woodbine Racetrack and changed to a turf race. Renamed the King Edward Breeders' Handicap, in 2007 it became a Stakes event.

Since inception, the King Edward Stakes has been raced at a variety of distances:

- 1 1/4 miles : 1903-1917 (Old Woodbine Racetrack)
- 1 1/16 miles : 1920-1957 on dirt at Old Woodbine Park, 1958-1993 on turf at Woodbine Racetrack, and on turf in 1994 at Fort Erie Race Track
- 1 1/8 miles : 1995-2009 on turf at Woodbine Racetrack
- 1 mile : beginning 2010

Due to the large number of entries, the King Edward was raced in two divisions in 1978, 1984, 1985, 1987, and 1988. There was no race held in 1918, 1919, 1943, 1945, and 1956.

== Records ==
Speed record: (at current distance of 1 mile)

- 1:31.73 - Olympic Runner (2021)

Speed record: (at distance of 1 1/8 miles)

- 1:44.73 - Rahy's Attorney (2009) (new stakes and course record)

Most wins:

- 3 - Inferno (1906, 1907, 1908)

Most wins by an owner:

- 9 - Sam-Son Farm (1974, 1987, 1988, 1991, 1997, 1999, 2001, 2005, 2010)

Most wins by a jockey:

- 4 - Robin Platts (1968, 1977, 1978, 1979)
- 4 - Dave Penna (1986, 1987, 1989, 1990)

Most wins by a trainer:

- 7 - Lou Cavalaris, Jr. (1959, 1965, 1966, 1967, 1968, 1976, 1978)

== Winners of the King Edward Stakes ==
Year	Winner	Age	Jockey	Trainer	Owner	Time
2026	Gas Me Up	6	Fraser Aebly	Kevin Attard	Exline-Border Racing, Michael Jawl, Aaron Kennedy and Tom Zwiesler	1:35.44
2025	Gas Me Up	5	Flavien Prat	Kevin Attard	Exline-Border Racing LLC, Michael Jawl, Aaron Kennedy and Tom Zwiesler	1:33.85
2024	Fil Di Arianna (BRZ)	8	Sahin Civaci	Mark E. Casse	Gary Barber, Wachtel Stable and Peter, Deutsch	1:34.07
2023	War Bomber (IRE)	5	Rico W. Walcott	Norman McKnight	Bruno Schickedanz	1:32.41
2022	Filo Di Arianna (BRZ)	6	Kimura Kazushi	Mark E. Casse	Gary Barber, Peter Deutsch, & Wachtel Stables	1:34.69
2021	Olympic Runner	5	Rafael Manuel Hernandez	Mark E. Casse	Gary Barber	1:31.73
2020	March To The Arch	5	Rafael Manuel Hernandez	Mark E. Casse	Live Oak Plantation	1:32.28
2019	Synchrony	6	Javier Castellano	Michael Stidham	Pin Oak Stable	1:32.95
2018	Delta Prince	5	Javier Castellano	James Jerkens	Stronach Stables	1:32.35
2017	Go Bro	6	Jesse Campbell	Michael Keogh	Gustav Schickedanz	1:34.09
2016	Dimension (GB)	8	David Moran	Conor Murphy	Riverside Bloodstock	1:33.19
2015	Tower of Texas	4	Eurico Rosa Da Silva	Roger L. Attfield	Van Meter/Dilworth	1:32.45
2014	Grand Arch	5	David Moran	Brian A. Lynch	Jim & Susan Hill	1:32.49
2013	Riding the River	6	Todd Kabel	David Cotey	Dominion Bloodstock/HGHR/Linmac Farm	1:33.24
2012	Riding the River	5	Todd Kabel	David Cotey	Dominion Bloodstock/HGHR/Linmac Farm	1:32.89
2011	Court of the Realm	4	Eurico Rosa Da Silva	Peter Berringer	Aurora Meadows/Oxbridge Farm	1:35.86
2010	Grand Adventure	4	Patrick Husbands	Mark Frostad	Sam-Son Farm	1:36.40
2009	Rahy's Attorney	5	Slade Callaghan	Ian Black	Ellie Boje Farm et al.	1:44.73
2008	Royal Oath	5	Patrick Husbands	Mark E. Casse	W.S. Farish III/W. S. Farish IV	1:49.67
2007	Eccentric	6	David Clark	Roger Attfield	Gary A. Tanaka	1:46.83
2006	Sky Conqueror	4	Todd Kabel	Darwin Banach	W. A. Sorokolit, Sr.	1:46.64
2005	Silver Ticket	4	Todd Kabel	Mark Frostad	Sam-Son Farm	1:47.54
2004	Slew Valley	7	Jim McAleney	Reade Baker	Rich Meadow Farm	1:48.42
2003	Perfect Soul	7	Robert C. Landry	Roger Attfield	Charles E. Fipke	1:49.60
2002	Moon Solitaire	5	Robert C. Landry	Henry Cochran	Gainsborough Farm	1:50.26
2001	Quiet Resolve	6	Todd Kabel	Mark Frostad	Sam-Son Farm	1:47.12
2000	Incitatus	7	Slade Callaghan	Ronald Burke	John Kom-Tong	1:49.32
1999	Desert Waves	9	Neil Poznansky	Mark Frostad	Sam-Son Farm	1:46.49
1998	Crown Attorney	5	Mickey Walls	John P. MacKenzie	T. & M. J. Lamb	1:47.20
1997	Chief Bearhart	4	José A. Santos	Mark Frostad	Sam-Son Farm	1:46.20
1996	Kiridashi	5	Mickey Walls	Barbara J. Minshall	Minshall Farms	1:46.00
1995	Bold Ruritana	5	Robert C. Landry	Barbara J. Minshall	Minshall Farms	1:45.20
1994	Road Of War	4	Constant Montpellier	Timothy Regan	L. D. Regan	1:40.80
1993	Beau Fasa	7	Stanley Bethley	Gordon Colbourne	Box Arrow Farm	1:48.00
1992	Thunder Regent	5	Sandy Hawley	Vincent E. Tesoro	D. D. W. Stables	1:46.00
1991	Sky Classic	4	Pat Day	James E. Day	Sam-Son Farm	1:46.20
1990	Jalaajel	6	Dave Penna	Alton H. Quanbeck	D. Morgan Firestone	1:48.80
1989	Frosty The Snowman	4	Dave Penna	Happy Alter	Arthur I. Appleton	1:44.80
1988	Yankee Affair	6	Pat Day	Henry L. Carroll	Ju Ju Gen Stable	1:45.40
1988	Blue Finn	4	Sandy Hawley	James E. Day	Sam-Son Farm	1:45.60
1987	Cool Halo	4	Kenneth R. Skinner	James E. Day	Kingsbrook Farm	1:46.20
1987	Blue Finn	3	Dave Penna	James E. Day	Sam-Son Farm	1:45.60
1986	Within The Realm	6	Dave Penna	Alton H. Quanbeck	Mrs. J. A. McDougald	1:47.40
1985	To Tipperary	5	Brian Swatuk	Debi Lockhurst	Bo-Teek Farm	1:49.00
1985	Jacksboro	6	David Clark	Tony Mattine	E. H. Curnes	1:49.00
1984	Pax Nobiscum	4	Dan Beckon	Grant Pearce	Kingfield Farms	1:46.60
1984	Determinant	5	Gunnar Lindberg	Arthur H. Warner	Richard R. Kennedy	1:47.40
1983	Nijinsky's Secret	5	Jose A. Velez, Jr.	Kent Stirling	Mrs. J. A. McDougald	1:46.40
1982	Bridle Path	6	Paul Souter	Macdonald Benson	Windfields Farm	1:50.60
1981	Mr. Macho	4	Brian Swatuk	Laurie N. Anderson	Dundarg Stable	1:47.60
1980	Morold	5	Gary Stahlbaum	Michael J. Doyle	Bo-Teek Farm	1:48.60
1979	Dom Alaric	5	Robin Platts	Macdonald Benson	Windfields Farm	1:46.60
1978	Ground Cover	4	Robin Platts	Frank A. Passero	Windrush/Saunders	1:48.00
1978	Bold Enterprise	5	Gary Stahlbaum	Lou Cavalaris, Jr.	Gardiner Farm	1:48.00
1977	Brilliant Sandy	5	Robin Platts	Jerry C. Meyer	Smith/Willow Downs	1:49.80
1976	Carney's Point	7	Avelino Gomez	Lou Cavalaris, Jr.	Gardiner Farm	1:49.60
1975	Wing Span	5	William Parsons	David Guitard	Kinghaven Farms	1:46.80
1974	Selari Spirit	4	Gunnar Lindberg	Arthur H. Warner	Sam-Son Farm	1:50.80
1973	Lord Vancouver	5	Lloyd Duffy	Frank H. Merrill, Jr.	W. Preston Gilbride	1:49.00
1972	Lord Vancouver	4	Lloyd Duffy	Frank H. Merrill, Jr.	W. Preston Gilbride	1:49.00
1971	Stradwin	5	James Kelly	Andrew G. Smithers	E. Lieberman	1:47.20
1970	Laughing Bill	5	John LeBlanc	Andrew G. Smithers	Hillcrest Stable	1:46.60
1969	No Parando	4	John LeBlanc	Yonnie Starr	F. H. Sherman	1:47.00
1968	The Knack	4	Robin Platts	Lou Cavalaris, Jr.	Gardiner Farm	1:46.80
1967	Orbiter	6	Avelino Gomez	Lou Cavalaris, Jr.	Hillcrest Stable	1:47.80
1966	Orbiter	5	P. Maxwell	Lou Cavalaris, Jr.	Hillcrest Stable	1:44.00
1965	Arctic Hills	4	Eric Walsh	Lou Cavalaris, Jr.	Vernon G. Cardy	1:44.80
1964	Sunny	4	Harlon Dalton	Warren Beasley	Bill Beasley Stable	1:44.20
1963	Burnt Roman	4	Jim Fitzsimmons	Jerry C. Meyer	Waggoner / Keane	1:43.80
1962	Prompt Hero	6	Sam McComb	W. Haynes	P. Del Greco	1:44.60
1961	Greek Sovereign	5	John Ralph Adams	Carl Chapman	Mrs. N. L. Nathenson	1:44.00
1960	Anita's Son	4	Hugo Dittfach	Arthur H. Warner	Lanson Farm	1:49.60
1959	War Eagle	5	Clifford Potts	Lou Cavalaris, Jr.	P. Del Greco	1:44.40
1958	Kitty Girl	4	R. Gonzalez	Yonnie Starr	Maloney & Smythe	1:45.80
1957	Fleet Path	5	Edward Plesa	Arthur H. Warner	Lanson Farm	1:44.40
1955	Freedom Parley	5	W. Hawksworth	Willie Thurner	D. G. Ross	1:45.00
1954	Chain Reaction	4	William Zakoor	Richard Townrow	Mrs. Elodie S. Tomlinson	1:48.60
1953	Loridale	5	Billie Fisk	Arthur H. Warner	Maner Stable	1:43.80
1952	Bennington	3	Jose Vina	John Passero	Bill Beasley Stable	1:48.00
1951	Beau Dandy	6	Johnny Dewhurst	R. Anderson	Wilma Kennedy	1:44.60
1950	Escador	4	David H. Prater	James C. Bentley	Addison Stable	1:45.80
1949	Free As Air	5	Paul J. Bailey	William G. Trevenen	C. Krupp	1:45.80
1948	Double Briar	5	F. Dougherty	Morris Fishman	H. Lahman	1:45.00
1947	Kingarvie	4	Colin McDonald	Arthur Brent	Parkwood Stable	1:47.20
1946	Broom Time	5	L. Kerr	T. Frost	J. E. Frost	1:46.00
1944	Grand Pal	nf	Johnny Dewhurst	Cecil Howard	Harry C. Hatch	1:46.40
1942	Yawl	4	Harry Meynell	A. Bennie	Art J. Halliwell	1:46.00
1941	Bar Fly	6	S. Denny Birley	Frank Gilpin	Parkwood Stable	1:49.80
1940	Sir Marlboro	4	Charlie McTague	W. Coburn	Conn Smythe	1:51.00
1939	Bar Fly	4	Albert Schmidl	Frank Gilpin	Parkwood Stable	1:46.20
1938	Jesting	8	Anthony Pascuma	Harry Giddings, Jr.	K. T. Davies	1:46.20
1937	Teddy Haslam	4	Pat Remillard	H. Chappell	C. N. Mooney	1:47.20
1936	Tempestuous	4	Frankie Mann	Frank Gilpin	Mrs. T. Stevenson	1:48.20
1935	Shady Well	6	Herb Lindberg	Johnny J. Thorpe	Edward F. Seagram	1:45.80
1934	Khorasan	6	Pat Remillard	J. Badame	Mrs. J. Badame	1:45.60
1933	Dis Dat	4	Red Pollard	W. McGirr	T. Donley	1:48.80
1932	Tred Avon	4	James H. Burke	William Irvine	Sylvester W. Labrot	1:45.80
1931	Frisius	5	Anthony Pascuma	George Tappen	Belair Stud Stable	1:45.40
1930	Marine	4	Fred Slate	Harry Giddings, Jr.	Mount Royal Stable	1:47.80
1929	Sir Harry	5	John Maiben	William H. Bringloe	Seagram Stable	1:46.40
1928	Boom	4	Nick Wall	F. Riley	Bell Farm Stable	1:46.40
1927	Single Foot	5	Raymond Peternel	Harry Rites	J. Edwin Griffith	1:46.80
1926	Edisto	4	Henry Erickson	William H. Bringloe	Seagram Stable	1:44.80
1925	General Thatcher	5	Louis Schaefer	Preston M. Burch	Nevada Stock Farm	1:45.60
1924	New Hampshire	4	Pete Walls	Henry McDaniel	J. K. L. Ross	1:46.20
1923	Baby Grand	5	Albert Claver	Henry McDaniel	J. K. L. Ross	1:45.00
1922	Golden Sphere	4	John McTaggart	William H. Bringloe	Seagram Stable	1:45.00
1921	Boniface	6	Frank Keogh	Henry McDaniel	J. K. L. Ross	1:46.60
1920	Foreground	5	James H. Butwell	W. Burke	Maryland Stable	1:47.00
1917	Hanovia	5	A. Mott	E. T. Colton	E. T. Colton	2:10.40
1916	Raincoat	4	Frank Robinson	Howard Oots	C. Straus	2:08.20
1915	Tactics	6	Rufus Shilling	J. Arthur	F. J. Coleman	2:09.00
1914	Tactics	5	J. Smyth	J. Arthur	F. J. Coleman	2:06.80
1913	Kleburne	3	Clarence Turner	W. M. Martin	A. Turney	2:06.60
1912	Edda	4	Sweeney	John F. Schorr	John W. Schorr	2:10.60
1911	Zeus	3	Carroll H. Shilling	Sam Hildreth	Sam Hildreth	2:04.20
1910	Chief Kee	3	Guy Burns	E. Gleason	John Dyment Jr.	2:06.20
1909	Hanbridge	4	Fred Herbert	George Ham	G. H. Holle	2:06.40
1908	Inferno	6	Carroll H. Shilling	Barry Littlefield	Joseph E. Seagram	2:09.60
1907	Inferno	5	R. McDaniel	Barry Littlefield	Joseph E. Seagram	2:06.40
1906	Inferno	4	John K. Treubel	Barry Littlefield	Joseph E. Seagram	2:05.00
1905	Tongorder	3	E. Walsh	John Dyment	Nathaniel Dyment	2:09.00
1904	Claude	4	Johnny Daly	Michael J. Daly	Michael J. Daly	2:12.00
1903	Wire In	4	J. Walsh	John Nixon	Kirkfield Stable	2:10.20

== See also ==
- List of Canadian flat horse races
