= Seagram (disambiguation) =

Seagram was a Canadian alcoholic beverages company.

Seagram or Seagram's or variation, may also refer to:

== People ==
- Seagram (rapper), an American rapper

=== People with the surname ===
- Barbara Seagram (born 1949), Barbadian-Canadian contract-bridge cardgame authority
- Edward F. Seagram (1873–1937), Canadian politician and businessman, son of distiller Joseph Emm Seagram
- Henry Froude Seagram (1802–1843), Governor of Gambia
- Joseph E. Seagram (1841–1919), Canadian businessman, politician and racehorse owner, the namesake of the Seagram company
- Lisa Seagram (1936–2019), U.S. actress

== Facilities and structures ==
- Seagram House, a historic building and former HQ of Seagram in Montreal, Quebec
- Seagram Building, a skyscraper in Manhattan, New York City
- Seagram Museum, a museum in Waterloo, Ontario that records the history of the Canadian company, formerly the Waterloo Distillery, formerly the original Seagram Distillery
- Seagram's Distillery, a historically significant building complex in Louisville, Kentucky

== Other uses ==
- Seagram (racehorse), a New Zealand foaled racehorse
- Rochester Seagrams, a former name of the Sacramento Kings, an American basketball team

== See also ==
- Seagram Stables, a Canadian Thoroughbred horse racing operation
- Seagram Cup Stakes, a Canadian graded stakes race inaugurated in 1903
- Seagram's Seven Crown, an American blended whiskey
- SEGRAM
