= Herb Lindberg =

Swiss-Canadian jockey (1909–1983)

Personal information
- Born: November 8, 1909 Gothenburg, Sweden
- Died: August 2, 1983 (aged 73) Toronto, Ontario, Canada
- Resting place: McAffee Cemetery, Fort Erie, Ontario
- Occupation: Jockey

Horse racing career
- Sport: Horse racing
- Career wins: 1,300+

Major racing wins
- King Edward Stakes (1935); Victoria Stakes (1935, 1940); Grey Stakes (1936, 1953); Jockey Club Cup Handicap (1938, 1940, 1952); Jamaica Handicap (1941); Hialeah Stakes (1941); Westchester Handicap (1941); Matron Stakes (1942); Manhattan Handicap (1942); Saratoga Cup (1942); Ardsley Handicap (1943); Gallant Fox Handicap (1943, 1945); Whitney Handicap (1943, 1945); Cherry Hill Handicap (1944); Diana Stakes (1944); Fashion Stakes (1944); New England Oaks (1944); Suburban Handicap (1944); Test Stakes (1944); Gallant Fox Handicap (1945); Questionnaire Handicap (1945); Bahamas Stakes (1946); Clarendon Stakes (1946); Coronation Futurity Stakes (1946, 1953); Cup and Saucer Stakes (1946, 1953); Princess Elizabeth Stakes (1946); William Penn Stakes (1946); Yankee Handicap (1946); Bay Meadows Handicap (1947); Comely Stakes (1949); Molly Pitcher Stakes (1950); Maple Leaf Stakes (1952); Autumn Stakes (1953); Plate Trial Stakes (1953, 1954); Connaught Cup Stakes (1955); Canadian Handicap (1955); Fury Stakes (1956); My Dear Stakes (1956); Selene Stakes (1956, 1957); Bold Venture Stakes (1957); Duchess Stakes (1957); Vigil Stakes (1957); Nettie Handicap (1957) Canadian Classic Race wins: King's Plate (1935); Breeders' Stakes (1935, 1946)

Honours
- Canadian Horse Racing Hall of Fame (1991)

Significant horses
- Bolingbroke, Casa Camara, King Maple, Mona Bell, Sally Fuller, Shady Well, Windfields

Gunnar Herbert "Herb" Lindberg (November 8, 1909 - August 2, 1983) was a Canadian Thoroughbred racing jockey whose family emigrated from Sweden when he was nine years old. Attracted to horse racing in his late teens he went to the United States where he would work as an exercise rider for Brookmeade Stable for five years. Jockeys usually are in their prime by age 25, but Lindberg only rode in his first race at that age in 1934 at Hawthorne Race Course in Stickney, Illinois, a Chicago suburb.

Before long, Lindberg's riding skills resulted in his services being sought out by prominent owners in both Canada and the U.S. such as Jock Whitney, Samuel McLaughlin, Walter M. Jeffords Sr., Edward F. Seagram, Conn Smythe, Louis B. Mayer, E. P. Taylor, and George D. Widener Jr., among others. In 1935 Lindberg had his most important Canadian win when he rode the Seagram filly Sally Fuller to victory in Canada's most prestigious race, the King's Plate. Lindberg followed that success with a second prestigious win coming in the Breeders' Stakes aboard another of Seagram's horses, Gay Sympathy. Both races would become part of the Canadian Triple Crown series when formally established in 1959. Lindbergh won a second Breeders' Stakes in 1946 aboard Windfields owned by E. P. Taylor who would name his world renown breeding farm in Oshawa, Ontario.

== An exceptional day of race riding ==
While competing at Belmont Park, on September 26, 1942, Herb Lindberg set two track records on a single racecard when he rode the Townsend B. Martin stable's Bolingbroke to victory in the Manhattan Handicap and the Falaise Stable's filly Good Morning in the Matron Stakes that had a field of twenty runners. What made his performance in the Manhattan Handicap win even more notable was that he defeated the 1941 U. S. Triple Crown winner, Whirlaway. In the subsequent race, Linberg got his third win of the day aboard the filly Elimar in the Harmonicon High Weight Handicap.

== Racing Honors ==
In 1991 Herb Lindberg was posthumously inducted into the Canadian Horse Racing Hall of Fame.

Herb Lindberg's son Gunnar would also become a successful jockey who, in 2024, was voted the prestigious Avelino Gomez Memorial Award.
