= Coronation Futurity Stakes =

Horse race in Canada

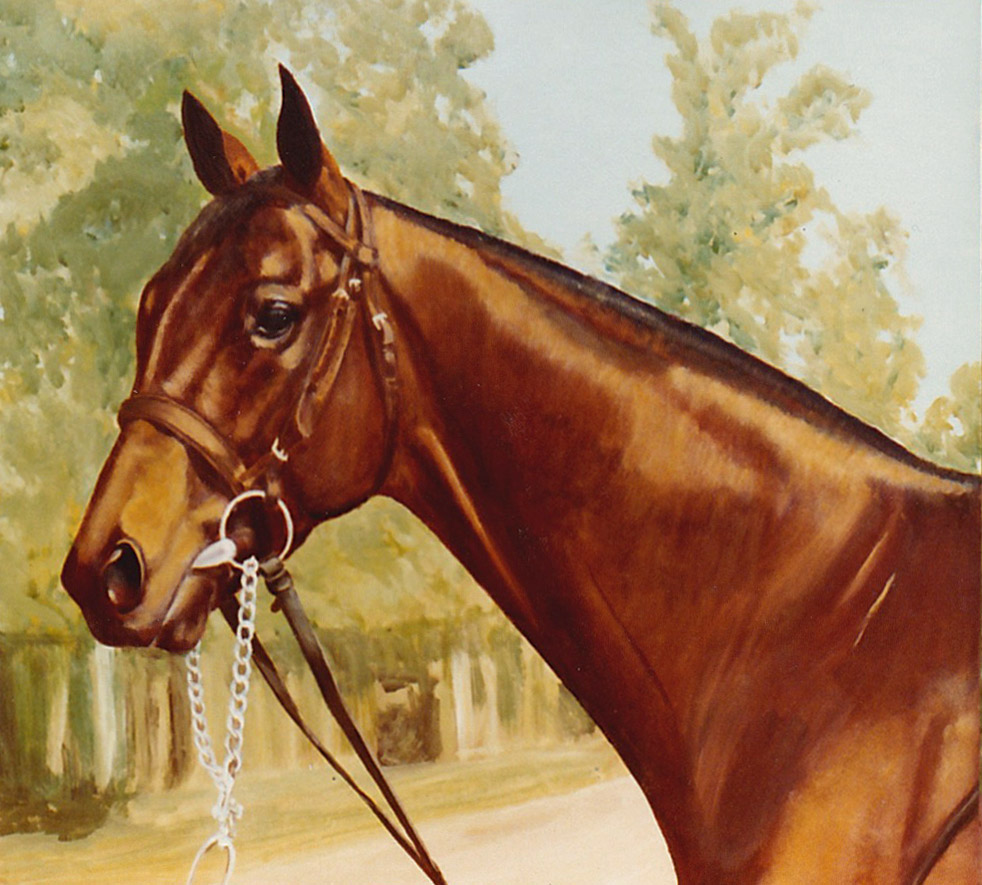
- Norcliffe, painted by Bob Demuyser (1920-2003)
- Class: Restricted
- Location: Woodbine Racetrack; Toronto, Ontario, Canada
- Inaugurated: 1902
- Race type: Thoroughbred - Flat racing
- Website: www.woodbineentertainment.com/qct/default.asp

Race information
- Distance: 1 1/8 miles (9 furlongs)
- Surface: Tapeta synthetic dirt
- Track: left-handed
- Qualification: Two-year-olds foaled in Canada
- Weight: 122 pounds
- Purse: Can$250,000

The Coronation Futurity Stakes is a Thoroughbred horse race for 2-year-old horses foaled in Canada. It is run annually in mid-November at Woodbine Racetrack in Toronto, Ontario, Canada at a distance of 1 1/8 miles. Along with its turf counterpart, the Cup and Saucer Stakes, the Coronation Futurity is the richest race for two-year-olds foaled in Canada.

Inaugurated in 1902 at Toronto's Old Woodbine Racetrack, it was created in celebration of the August 9, 1902 coronation of Edward VII of the United Kingdom. The winner of the race often becomes the early favorite for next year's Queen's Plate, though the last horse to win both races was Norcliffe in 1975.

The 1963 winner was Northern Dancer who would go on to win the Kentucky Derby and Preakness Stakes and become the most important sire of the 20th century. His jockey for the 1963 race was future Canadian and U.S. Hall of Fame jockey Ron Turcotte who, ten years later, would ride Secretariat to victory in the U.S. Triple Crown series.

Sunny's Halo won the 1982 edition of the Coronation Futurity and went on to win the following year's Kentucky Derby.

Since inception, the Coronation Futurity has been contested at a variety of distances:

- 4 furlongs : 1902–1909 at Old Woodbine Racetrack
- 4 1/2 furlongs : 1909–1917 at Old Woodbine Racetrack
- 5 furlongs : 1920–1926 at Old Woodbine Racetrack
- 6 furlongs : 1927–1940 at Old Woodbine Racetrack
- 1 mile : 1941–1948 at Old Woodbine Racetrack
- 1 mile and 70 yards : 1949-1956 Old Woodbine Racetrack, 1957 at the new Woodbine Racetrack
- 1 1/16 miles : 1958–1960 at Woodbine Racetrack
- 1 1/8 miles : 1961 to present at Woodbine Racetrack

The race was run on a natural dirt surface until Woodbine installed a synthetic dirt surface in 2006. In 2016, the surface was Tapeta; it was Polytrack between 2006 and 2015.

== Records ==
Speed record: (at current distance of 1 1/8 miles)

- 1:49.20 - Norcliffe (1975) - natural dirt
- 1:50.91 - Martimer (2011) - Polytrack

Most wins by an owner:

- 8 - Windfields Farm and/or E. P. & Winnifred Taylor (1950, 1952, 1956, 1959, 1961, 1963, 1968, 1973)

Most wins by a jockey:

- 5 - Avelino Gomez (1964, 1965, 1966. 1967, 1972)
- 5 - Sandy Hawley (1971, 1973, 1974, 1975, 1976)

Most wins by a trainer:

- 7- Harry Giddings, Jr. (1911, 1912, 1913, 1915, 1920, 1933, 1936)
- 5 - James E. Day (1984, 1985, 1987, 1990, 2001)

== Winners ==
Year	Winner	Jockey	Trainer	Owner	Time	Ref
2024	Notorious Gangster	Fraser Aebly	Josie Carroll	Mark Dodson	1:52.70	
2023	Babbo	Eswan Flores	Sid C. Attard	Lucio Tucci	1:52.06	
2022	Velocitor	Justin Stein	Kevin Attard	Al Ulwelling & Bill Ulwelling	1:52.00	
2021	The Minkster	David Moran	Daniel J. Vella	Sea Glass Stables	1:52.51	
2020	Stephen	Justin Stein	Kevin Attard	Al and Bill Ulwelling	1:52.46	
2019	Halo Again	Rafael Hernandez	Steve Asmussen	Winchell Thoroughbreds & Willis Horton Racing	1:51.82	
2018	Avie's Flatter	Eurico Rosa da Silva	Josie Carroll	Ivan Dalos	1:51.02	
2017	Aheadbyacentury	Rafael Hernandez	John A. Ross	Jacks of Hearts Racing & J.R. Racing	1:51.02	
2016	King and His Court	Gary Boulanger	Mark E. Casse	Gary Barber & Wachtel Stable	1:50.76	
2015	Shakhimat	Emma-Jayne Wilson	Roger L. Attfield	Dan Gale	1:51.10	
2014	Decision Day	Jesse M. Campbell	Josie Carroll	Donver Stable	1:52.50	
2013	Asserting Bear	James McAleney	Reade Baker	Bear Stables, Ltd. (Danny Dion)	1:50.96	
2012	Up With the Birds	Eurico Rosa da Silva	Malcolm Pierce	Sam-Son Farms	1:51.13	
2011	Martimer	Luis Contreras	Sid C. Attard	Norseman Racing Stable	1:50.91	
2010	Strike Oil	Luis Contreras	Mark E. Casse	John C. Oxley	1:52.10	
2009	Hollinger	Tyler Pizarro	Roger Attfield	Bob Harvey & Al Wortzman	1:51.55	
2008	Active Duty	Corey Fraser	Mark E. Casse	Woodford Racing LLC	1:52.01	
2007	Kesagami	Patrick Husbands	Sid C. Attard	Jim Dandy Stable	1:53.40	
2006	Leonnatus Anteas	Jono Jones	Kevin Attard	Knob Hill Stable	1:55.97	
2005	Thinking Out Loud	Todd Kabel	David R. Bell	D. Morgan Firestone	1:54.84	
2004	Ablo	Gerry Olguin	Roger Attfield	Attfield/Canino/Werner	1:55.24	
2003	A Bit O'Gold	Jono Jones	Catherine Day Phillips	The Two Bit Racing Stable	1:54.15	
2002	Arco's Gold (Note: In 2002 Arco's Gold and Mobil raced to a Dead heat for the win but Mobil was subsequently disqualified for interference and set back to second.)	Constant Montpellier	John A. Ross	Steven & Alex DiIorio	1:53.75	
2001	Streakin Rob	Gary Boulanger	James E. Day	Cudney Stables/Allan Kent	1:53.63	
2000	Highland Legacy	Emile Ramsammy	Steve Owens	Empress Stable	1:54.20	
1999	Dixieland Diamond	Todd Kabel	Mark Frostad	Sam-Son Farm	1:55.06	
1998	Zaha	Robbie Davis	Kiaran McLaughlin	Shadwell Racing	1:55.20	
1997	Classic Result	Sandy Hawley	Macdonald Benson	Augustin Stable	1:54.00	
1996	Love View	Mickey Walls	David R. Bell	R. F. & J. E. Shaw	1:55.60	
1995	Firm Dancer	Jim McAleney	Mike Keogh	Gus Schickedanz	1:53.80	
1994	Talkin Man	Robert Landry	Roger Attfield	Kinghaven/Stollery	1:52.60	
1993	Parental Pressure	Jack Lauzon	Fred H. Loschke	Hammer Kopf et al.	1:53.80	
1992	Circulating	Sandy Hawley	Rod Wright	Sherwood/Sheehan	1:54.20	
1991	Keen Falcon	Sandy Hawley	Emile M. Allain	Keen Syndicate	1:55.00	
1990	Rainbows For Life	Brian Swatuk	James E. Day	Sam-Son Farm	1:52.00	
1989	French King	Sandy Hawley	Bill Marko	Rocco A. Marcello	1:57.00	
1988	Spigot	Jim McAleney	David R. Bell	John A. Franks	1:53.60	
1987	Regal Classic	Dave Penna	James E. Day	Sam-Son & Windfields	1:53.80	
1986	Bold Executive	Richard Dos Ramos	Gerry Belanger	Romeo/Marcello/Pedigree	1:54.60	
1985	Grey Classic	Irwin Driedger	James E. Day	Sam-Son Farm	1:55.80	
1984	Dauphin Fabuleux	Jeffrey Fell	James E. Day	Sam-Son Farm	1:53.20	
1983	Prince Avatar	Robin Platts	Bil Marko	Royal Crown S./Marko	1:53.00	
1982	Sunny's Halo	Dave Penna	David C. Cross Jr.	David J. Foster	1:53.60	
1981	Le Danseur	Gary Stahlbaum	Jacques Dumas	Jean-Louis Levesque	1:51.00	
1980	Bayford	Robin Platts	John J. Tammaro, Jr.	Kinghaven Farm	1:51.20	
1979	Allan Blue	Joey Belowus	Gil Rowntree	Stafford Farm	1:54.60	
1978	Medaille d'Or	Jean Cruguet	Yonnie Starr	Jean-Louis Levesque	1:50.60	
1977	Overskate	Robin Platts	Gil Rowntree	Stafford Farm	1:52.20	
1976	Giboulee	Sandy Hawley	Jacques Dumas	Jean-Louis Levesque	1:50.80	
1975	Norcliffe	Sandy Hawley	Roger Attfield	Norcliffe Stable	1:49.20	
1974	L'Enjoleur	Sandy Hawley	Yonnie Starr	Jean-Louis Levesque	1:51.80	
1973	Lord Durham	Sandy Hawley	James C. Bentley	Windfields Farm	1:52.80	
1972	Zaca Spirit	Avelino Gomez	Clarke Whitaker	Bo-Teek Farm	1:50.60	
1971	Gentleman Conn	Sandy Hawley	Jerry C. Meyer	Willow Downs Farm	1:51.60	
1970	Great Gabe	John Baboolal	Jerry C. Meyer	Willow Downs Farm	1:52.40	
1969	Dauntless Spirit	Hugo Dittfach	V. Walker	Bo-Teek Farm	1:53.40	
1968	Viceregal	Richard Grubb	Gordon J. McCann	Windfields Farm	1:51.60	
1967	Arctic Blizzard	Avelino Gomez	Lou Cavalaris, Jr.	M. Seitz & J. Reid	1:54.20	
1966	Cool Reception	Avelino Gomez	Lou Cavalaris, Jr.	M. Seitz & J. Reid	1:53.40	
1965	Titled Hero	Avelino Gomez	Patrick MacMurchy	Peter K. Marshall	1:55.40	
1964	Good Old Mort	Avelino Gomez	Jerry C. Meyer	Edward B. Seedhouse	1:54.60	
1963	Northern Dancer	Ron Turcotte	Horatio Luro	Windfields Farm	1:51.00	
1962	Welcome Pardner	Richard Armstrong	Roy Johnson	Golden West Farm	1:52.20	
1961	Choperion	James Fitzsimmons	Horatio Luro	Windfields Farm	1:52.00	
1960	Jammed Lucky	Hugo Dittfach	Yonnie Starr	Conn Smythe	1:46.20	
1959	Victoria Park	Avelino Gomez	Horatio Luro	Windfields Farm	1:46.40	
1958	Bull Vic	Al Coy	Yonnie Starr	Maloney & Smythe	1:45.80	
1957	Stole The Ring	C. O'Brien	E. Hall	Miss C. B. Armstrong	1:45.40	
1956	Chopadette	Vic Bovine	Gordon J. McCann	Winnifred Taylor	1:43.40	
1955	Canadian Champ	David Stevenson	John Passero	William R. Beasley	1:43.40	
1954	Baffin Bay	R. Buisson	M. Long	Luxiana Farm	1:47.00	
1953	King Maple	Herb Lindberg	J. Hornsby	Mrs. G. McMacken	1:43.00	
1952	Canadiana	Jose Vina	Gordon J. McCann	E. P. Taylor	1:47.00	
1951	Flareday	R. Buisson	John J. Thorpe	J. E. Frowde Seagram	1:47.40	
1950	Britannia	Gil Robillard	Gordon J. McCann	E. P. Taylor	1:44.00	
1949	Unionville	F. Dodge	D. Sommerville	H. Clifford Hatch	1:45.60	
1948	Speedy Irish	Johnny Dewhurst	Octave Viau	G. H. McCullagh	1:44.60	
1947	Last Mark	Howard Bailey	Jim G. Fair	Jim G. Fair	1:41.00	
1946	Casa Camara	Herb Lindberg	Robert K. Hodgson	William. F. Morrissey	1:39.60	
1945	Kingarvie	Johnny Dewhurst	Richard Townrow	Parkwood Stable	1:42.60	
1944	Uttermost	Bobby Watson	Cecil Howard	Harry C. Hatch	1:40.40	
1943	Cyperac	Sydney Denny Birley	Arthur Brent	Parkwood Stable	1:41.20	
1942	Grandpal	Harry Meynell	Loyd Gentry, Sr.	Harry C. Hatch	1:42.40	
1941	Cossack Post	Bobby Watson	Loyd Gentry, Sr.	Harry C. Hatch	1:44.60	
1940	Depositor	Pat Remillard	Leo Woodstock	Medway Stable	1:14.00	
1939	Katie Bud	Norman Foden	Dave Garrity	Dave Garrity	1:14.00	
1938	Jelwell	Stirling Young	Bert Alexandra	Cosgrave Stable	1:14.00	
1937	Skyros	M. Delio	F. Cook	H. Talbot	1:15.60	
1936	Pagan King	Colin McDonald	Harry Giddings, Jr.	Parkwood Stable	1:12.80	
1935	Sweepouch	Stirling Young	William H. Bringloe	Harry C. Hatch	1:14.60	
1934	Lipton	Eddie Barnes	Jack Hutton	Ryland H. New	1:13.80	
1933	Horometer	Frankie Mann	Harry Giddings, Jr.	Col. R. S. McLaughlin	1:13.80	
1932	Khaki John	John Mattioli	J. Hynes	Thorncliffe Stable	1:14.60	
1931	Easter Hatter	G. Riley	Loyd Gentry, Sr.	Harry C. Hatch	1:16.40	
1930	Rare Jewel	Norman Foden	William Campbell	Conn Smythe	1:15.00	
1929	Spearhead	Frank Coltiletti	John J. Hastings	Tedluc Stable	1:15.20	
1928	Pin Wheel	Frankie Mann	Fred H. Schelke	Thorncliffe Stable	1:15.75	
1927	Young Kitty	John McTaggart	William H. Bringloe	Seagram Stable	1:14.60	
1926	Arrant Jade	F. Smith	G. Miller	Lily A. Livingston	1:04.80	
1925	Phanariot	B. Kennedy	William H. Bringloe	Seagram Stable	1:02.40	
1924	Fairbank	Edward Scobie	J. Coleman	James C. Fletcher	1:02.20	
1923	Isoletta	T. Wilson	William H. Bringloe	Seagram Stable	1:01.60	
1922	Ocean Crest	John McTaggart	Fred H. Schelke	Thorncliffe Stable	1:02.00	
1921	Captain Scott	John McTaggart	J. Coleman	Thorncliffe Stable	1:03.20	
1920	Chief Sponsor	Roxy Romanelli	Harry Giddings, Jr.	Harry Giddings, Sr.	1:02.40	
1919	no race					
1918	no race					
1917	Sea Froth	T. Parrington	Barry T. Littlefield	Joseph E. Seagram	0:56.00	
1916	Gold Galore	Arthur Pickens	Barry T. Littlefield	Joseph E. Seagram	0:55.20	
1915	Armine	W. Stevenson	Harry Giddings, Jr.	Harry Giddings, Sr.	0:56.40	
1914	Linsin	F. Goldstein	Albert G. Weston	Charles S. Campbell	0:56.60	
1913	Beehive	Johnny Wilson	Harry Giddings, Jr.	Harry Giddings, Sr.	0:55.60	
1912	Hearts of Oak	Clarence Turner	Harry Giddings, Jr.	Harry Giddings, Sr.	0:56.60	
1911	Ondramon	Johnny Wilson	Harry Giddings, Jr.	Harry Giddings, Sr.	0:56.20	
1910	Satin Bower	D. McCarthy	R. Walker	Robert T. Davies	0:57.20	
1909	St. Cecilia	Trueman	William Shields	Robert T. Davies	0:58.40	
1908	Lady Milner	Carroll Shilling	Barry T. Littlefield	Joseph E. Seagram	0:49.60	
1907	Andrew Summers	James Kelly	H. McDonald	J. W. Groves	0:49.20	
1906	Festino	Barry T. Littlefield	John K. Treubel	Joseph E. Seagram	0:49.40	
1905	Zelinda	Roxy Romanelli	B. Pope	Robert T. Davies	0:51.00	
1904	Caper Sauce	Otto Wonderly	Barry T. Littlefield	Joseph E. Seagram	0:50.50	
1903	Loupanga	J. Daly	Robert T. Davies	Robert T. Davies	0:50.75	
1902	Ayrshire Lad	T. Waller	Edward Whyte	William Hendrie	0:51.50	
