= Shady Well =

Canadian-bred Thoroughbred racehorse

- Sire: Purple Shade
- Grandsire: Royal Canopy
- Dam: The Wishing Well
- Damsire: Viceroy
- Sex: Filly
- Foaled: 1929
- Country: Canada
- Colour: Bay
- Breeder: Seagram Stable
- Owner: Seagram Stable; Edward F. Seagram (1933)
- Trainer: William H. Bringloe; John J. Thorpe (1933)
- Record: 68: 15-?-?
- Earnings: $25,440

Major wins
- Clarendon Plate (1931); Durham Cup Handicap (1932, 1933, 1934); Maple Leaf Stakes (1932, 1933); King Edward Gold Cup (1935)

Honours
- Shady Well Stakes at Woodbine Racetrack

Shady Well (foaled 1929 in Ontario) was a Canadian Thoroughbred racehorse. Owned and bred by the Seagram brothers' Seagram Stable, she was sired by Purple Shade. Her dam was The Wishing Well whose sire was the British champion, The Tetrarch who was voted Britain's greatest two-year-old of the 20th Century.

Seagram Stable used trainer William Bringloe to race Shady well through age three but for 1933, Edward F. Seagram bought out his brother's interest. He then raced under his own name and transferred Shady Well's conditioning over to Johnny Thorpe.

Racing at age two, Shady Well won the 1931 Clarendon Plate and finished second in the Coronation Futurity Stakes. Among her fifteen career wins, against her female counterparts Shady Well won back-to-back editions of the Maple Leaf Stakes in 1932 and 1933. However, she is best remembered for her three straight wins between 1932 and 1934 against male horses in the Durham Cup Handicap which she followed up with another victory over males in the 1935 King Edward Gold Cup.
