= Inferno (horse) =

Canadian-bred Thoroughbred racehorse

- Sire: Havoc
- Grandsire: Himyar
- Dam: Bon Ino
- Damsire: Marauder
- Sex: Stallion
- Foaled: 1902
- Country: Canada
- Colour: Bay
- Breeder: Joseph E. Seagram
- Owner: Joseph E. Seagram
- Trainer: Barry Littlefield
- Record: Not found
- Earnings: Not found

Major wins
- Durham Cup Handicap (1906, 1908); King Edward Gold Cup (1906, 1907, 1908); Toronto Autumn Cup (1907) Canadian Classic Race wins: King's Plate (1905)

Honours
- Canadian Horse Racing Hall of Fame (1976)

Inferno (1902–1919) was a Canadian Thoroughbred racehorse. He has been called "Canada's first great racehorse" by the Canadian Horse Racing Hall of Fame.

== Background ==
He was owned and bred by distilling magnate Joseph E. Seagram and Member of the Canadian Parliament who in 1906 was voted president of the Ontario Jockey Club.

Inferno was out of the mare Bon Ino, who was owned and raced by Seagram and had won the 1898 Queen's Plate. Inferno's sire was Havoc, a stallion who ended his career as the sire of four King's Plate winners. Havoc was a son of Himyar, the Champion Sire in North America in 1893 who notably also produced U.S. Racing Hall of Fame inductee Domino. Inferno was a very raucous horse and reported to be a danger to his handlers.

== Racing career ==
He was conditioned for racing by New Jersey-born trainer Barry Littlefield. In 1905, the three-year-old Inferno won Canada's most prestigious race, the King's Plate. That year, he also finished second in both the Toronto Autumn Cup and the King Edward Gold Cup. In 1906, he was again second in the Toronto Autumn Cup but won the Durham Cup Handicap and the first of three consecutive King Edward Gold Cups. The following year, Inferno won his second King Edward Cup plus the Toronto Autumn Cup, and in 1908 he won his second Durham Cup and made it three wins in a row in the King Edward Gold Cup. In addition, his owner joined the Whitney family and other wealthy American elite in bringing horses to compete during the fashionable summer racing season at Saratoga Race Course in Saratoga Springs, New York. Inferno raced until age six and was part of Joseph Seagram's stable to race at Saratoga, where he won two important handicaps.

== Stud career ==
Retired to stud duty at Seagram's stud farm in Waterloo, Ontario, Inferno was not successful as a sire.

On its formation in 1976, the Canadian Horse Racing Hall of Fame inducted Inferno as part of its inaugural class.
