= Autumn Stakes (Canada) =

- Class: Grade 3
- Location: Woodbine Racetrack; Toronto, Ontario
- Inaugurated: 1902
- Race type: Thoroughbred - Flat racing
- Website: woodbine.com

Race information
- Distance: 1 1/16 miles (8.5 furlongs)
- Surface: Polytrack
- Track: left-handed
- Qualification: Three-year-olds and up
- Weight: Assigned, allowances
- Purse: $150,320

The Autumn Stakes is a Canadian Thoroughbred horse race run annually at Woodbine Racetrack in Toronto, Ontario. Run in mid November, it is open to horses aged three and older. It was raced on dirt until 2006 when the track's owners installed the new synthetic Polytrack surface. In 2025, the Canadian Graded Stakes Committee downgraded the Autumn Stakes to Grade 3 status.

The inaugural running in 1902 was won by the filly Janice, owned and trained by the prominent Kentucky horseman, Green B. Morris. Beginning in 1920, Kentucky Derby winner and U.S. Racing Hall of Fame inductee, Exterminator, won the race three straight years, more than any other horse. In 1991, Francine Villeneuve became the first female jockey to win the race.

Called the Toronto Autumn Cup before 1931, and Autumn Stakes Handicap from 1953 to 1954, it was run in two divisions in 1980 and 1981. There was no race held in 1917, 1918, 1919, 1940 and 1950. Since inception, the race has been run at various distances:

- 1 mile: 1980–1993 at Greenwood Raceway
- 1 1/8 miles: 1902 & 1935, 1953–1955 at Old Woodbine Racetrack
- 1 1/4 miles: 1903–1934 at Old Woodbine Racetrack, 1956–1960 at Greenwood Raceway, 1961–1979 at Woodbine Racetrack
- 1 1/16 miles: 1936–1952 at Old Woodbine Racetrack, 1994 to present at Woodbine Racetrack

== Records ==
Time record: (at current distance of 1 1/16 miles)

- 1:41.80 - Freedom Fleet (1995)

Most wins:

- 3 - Exterminator (1920, 1921, 1922)

Most wins by an owner:

- 4 - George M. Hendrie (1913, 1914, 1915, 1916)
- 4 - Willis Sharpe Kilmer (1920, 1921, 1922, 1930)

Most wins by a jockey:

- 5 - Patrick Husbands (2000, 2003, 2008, 2012, 2021)

Most wins by a trainer:

- 6 - Roger L. Attfield (1980, 1982, 1987, 2009, 2015, 2016)

== Winners ==
Year	Winner	Age	Jockey	Trainer	Owner	Time
2026	Runaway Again	4	Ryan Munger	Sid C. Attard	Stronach Stables	1:50.37
2025	Dresden Row	4	Ryan Munger	Lorne Richards	True North Stable and Bloom Racing Stable	1:50.07
2024	Wicked Django	4	Keveh Nicholls	Rodney Barrow	Ryan Brewster	1:48.45
2023	Wolfie's Dynaghost	5	Kazushi Kimura	Jonathan Thomas	Woodslane Farm	1:42.52
2022	Who's the Star	4	Emma-Jayne Wilson	Mark E. Casse	M Racing Group	1:41.10
2021	Mighty Heart	4	Patrick Husbands	Josie Carroll	Lawrence Cordes	1:42.51
2020	Skywire	4	Rafael Hernandez	Mark E. Casse	Gary Barber & Lucio Tucci	1:42.70
2019	Special Forces	4	Eurico Rosa da Silva	Kevin Attard	Soli Mehta & Partner	1:42.57
2018	Mr Havercamp	4	Eurico Rosa da Silva	Catherine Day Phillips	Sean & Dorothy Fitzhenry	1:42.36
2017	Gigantic Breeze	4	Gary Boulanger	Alexander F. McPherson	Hopefield Farm	1:42.38
2016	Are You Kidding Me	6	Alan Garcia	Roger L. Attfield	Ronald K. Kirk, John C. Bates & Michael Riordan	1:42.45
2015	Are You Kidding Me	5	Alan Garcia	Roger L. Attfield	Ronald K. Kirk, John C. Bates & Michael Riordan	1:43.41
2014	Lukes Alley	4	Luis Contreras	Josie Carroll	Melnyk Racing Stables	1:43.18
2013	Alpha Bettor	5	Justin Stein	Daniel J. Vella	Bulldog Racing	1:43.79
2012	James Street	5	Patrick Husbands	Josie Carroll	Melnyk Racing Stables	1:44.39
2011	Straight Story	5	Jesse Campbell	Alan E. Goldberg	Richard Santulli	1:42.87
2010	Stunning Stag	6	Gerry Olguin	Sid C. Attard	Janice Attard	1:42.75
2009	Palladio	7	Richard Dos Ramos	Roger Attfield	Haras Santa Maria de Araras	1:43.74
2008	Marchfied	4	Patrick Husbands	Mark E. Casse	Melnyk Racing Stables	1:43.28
2007	True Metropolitan	5	Jim McAleney	Terry Jordan	Bob Cheema	1:42.22
2006	True Metropolitan	4	Todd Kabel	Terry Jordan	Bob Cheema	1:44.88
2005	Cryptograph	4	Todd Kabel	Malcolm Pierce	Pin Oak Stable	1:43.96
2004	Mark One	5	Robert C. Landry	Daniel J. Vella	Stronach Stables	1:45.00
2003	No Comprende	5	Patrick Husbands	James Smith	Clarity Stables	1:43.93
2002	Parose	8	Todd Kabel	Alexander F. McPherson	John Atto	1:45.10
2001	Win City	3	Constant Montpellier	Robert P. Tiller	Frank DiGiulio Jr.	1:44.83
2000	One Way Love	5	Patrick Husbands	Abraham Katryan	B. Schickedanz & J. Hillier	1:43.59
1999	Vice n' Friendly	4	Mickey Walls	Lakeram Sukhdeo	Yarush Sesook, F. Dias, & B. Hiraman	1:45.63
1998	Cache In	4	Mickey Walls	David R. Bell	George Smith & Mike Oslanski	1:45.00
1997	Terremoto	6	Sandy Hawley	Bev Buck	J. & J. Everatt	1:42.20
1996	Stephanotis	3	Mickey Walls	Barbara J. Minshall	Minshall Farms	1:42.60
1995	Freedom Fleet	3	Todd Kabel	Daniel J. Vella	Frank Stronach	1:41.80
1994	Comarctic	5	Jim McAleney	Victor Ramos	Victor Ramos	1:44.00
1993	Blitzer	4	Robert C. Landry	Daniel J. Vella	Frank Stronach	1:37.80
1992	Stormy Gladiator	6	Mark Larsen	Fred H. Loschke	Hammer Kopf Farm	1:37.60
1991	Twist The Snow	5	Francine Villeneuve	Angus McArthur	Angus McArthur	1:36.60
1990	Tejabo	5	Larry Attard	Michael Mattine	Kepburn Stables	1:38.20
1989	Askar	3	Richard Dos Ramos	Pat Collins	Knob Hill Stable	1:37.00
1988	Beau Genius	3	Larry Attard	Gerry Belanger	Shiewitz / Davidson	1:39.80
1987	Control Zone	4	Don Seymour	Roger Attfield	Kinghaven Farms	1:38.40
1986	Jammed Prince	3	Jorge Pizarro	John Calhoun	John Calhoun	1:39.20
1985	Gone to Royalty	5	Irwin Driedger	Jacques Dumas	Pierre-Louis Levesque	1:40.00
1984	Nancy's Champion	4	Dan Beckon	Gil Rowntree	B. K. Y. Stable	1:40.00
1983	Cool Tania	5	George HoSang	Frank Sansano	T. Pollock & F. & T. Sansano	1:39.80
1982	Juan de Fuca	4	Richard Dos Ramos	Roger Attfield	Norcliffe Stable	1:39.60
1981	Decent Davey	4	David Clark	David C. Cross Jr.	David J. Foster	1:37.20
1981	Right Role	4	John Bell	Emile Allain	Jean Josephson	1:36.60
1980	Hasty Rick	3	Paul Souter	Donnie Walker	RMC Stable/Shefry	1:39.20
1980	Von Clausewitz	5	Robin Platts	Roger Attfield	Norcliffe Stable	1:37.40
1979	Knight's Turn	4	John Bell	Emile Allain	Mrs. C. Terfloth	2:03.80
1978	Majestic Kahala	4	Robin Platts	J. Mort Hardy	Windhaven	2:04.40
1977	Coverack	4	Don MacBeth	John Tammaro Jr.	Kinghaven Farms	2:03.80
1976	Brilliant Sandy	4	Sandy Hawley	Jerry C. Meyer	Sandy Smith et al.	2:04.40
1975	Lovely Sunrise	4	Colin Bain	Donnie Walker	Conn Smythe	2:03.20
1974	Selari Spirit	4	Gunnar Lindberg	Arthur H. Warner	Sam-Son Farm	2:03.00
1973	Twice Lucky	6	William McMahon	Donnie Walker	Conn Smythe	2:02.60
1972	Monte Christo II	5	Robin Platts	Lou Cavalaris Jr.	Gardiner Farm	2:01.20
1971	Twice Lucky	4	Hugo Dittfach	Donnie Walker	Conn Smythe	2:02.40
1970	Guion	5	Noel Turcotte	Carl F. Chapman	H. A. Grant	2:03.40
1969	Moonreindeer	4	Sandy Hawley	Jerry C. Meyer	Peter D. Fuller	2:03.40
1968	Valam	5	George Gibb	Lou Cavalaris Jr.	Hillcrest Stable	2:04.60
1967	Valam	4	Avelino Gomez	Lou Cavalaris Jr.	Hillcrest Stable	2:04.40
1966	Victorian Era	4	Avelino Gomez	Lou Cavalaris Jr.	Windfields Farm	2:03.00
1965	Bandangan	5	Jim Fitzsimmons	Lou Cavalaris Jr.	William R. Beasley	2:07.60
1964	Whiteborough	7	Richard Armstrong	Warren Beasley	C. S. Softley	2:08.20
1963	Puss 'n Boots	4	Ron Turcotte	Albert Trudell	R. & W. Gian	2:03.00
1962	Amber Morn	6	Harlon Dalton	Frank H. Merrill Jr.	Stafford Farms	2:06.20
1961	Lustrous Hope	4	Gerry Rasmussen	John Passero	G. Max Bell	2:02.40
1960	Gus Terry	3	John R. Adams	Roy Johnson	Mrs. H. A. Luro	2:04.40
1959	Strongboy	3	Avelino Gomez	Frank H. Merrill Jr.	J. E. F. Seagram	2:05.80
1958	Kitty Girl	4	Roberto Gonzalez	Johnny Thorpe	L. Maloney & C. Smythe	2:04.80
1957	Freedom Parley	7	Al Coy	Yonnie Starr	North Downs Farm	2:04.20
1956	Fleet Path	4	Ed Plesa	W. Waterman	Lanson Farm	2:04.20
1955	Hickory Hill	5	Avelino Gomez	Arthur H. Warner	S. Rotenberg	1:49.60
1954	Sampan	4	Mike Mafale	Frank H. Merrill Jr.	S. Rotenberg	1:53.60
1953	Try On	4	Herb Lindberg	Frank H. Merrill Jr.	William R. Beasley	1:52.00
1952	Beau Dandy	7	Victor Polk	John Passero	Wilma Kennedy	1:44.00
1951	Bull Page	4	Gil Robillard	R. Anderson	E. P. Taylor	1:43.80
1949	Double Briar	6	H. Campbell	Gordon J. McCann	J. Stuart Stable	1:45.40
1948	Canada's Teddy	4	David Prater	Vincent Stott	Mrs. M. Fishman	1:45.60
1947	Mugwump	7	Pat Remillard	Morris Fishman	J. Kemp	1:46.60
1946	North York	4	Alf Bavington	G. Stirling	H. Lahman	1:45.20
1945	Be Brief	5	Bobby Watson	Morris Fishman	Harry C. Hatch	1:45.00
1944	Mugwump	4	L. Kerr	Cecil Howard	J. Kemp	1:47.40
1943	Jacless	5	Pat Remillard	G. Stirling	Chris Stable	1:48.40
1942	Shepperton	3	Bobby Watson	B. S. Chris	Fred H. Schelke	1:47.40
1941	Silvos	4	S. Denny Birley	Fred H. Schelke	J. E. F. Seagram	1:48.00
1939	Filisteo	5	Bobby Watson	Johnny Thorpe	Harry C. Hatch	1:47.60
1938	Shoeless Joe	6	Norman Foden	Fred H. Schelke	Conn Smythe	1:46.00
1937	Tempestuous	5	J. Bryson	W. Coburn	Mrs. T. Stevenson	1:46.00
1936	Jack Patches	3	Pat Remillard	F. Ray	Cosgrave Stable	1:45.80
1935	Crofter	5	Eddie Barnes	Bert Alexandra	Donat Raymond	1:52.40
1934	Crofter	4	J. Thomas	Fred H. Schelke	Donat Raymond	2:05.40
1933	Khorasan	5	Johnny Mattioli	Fred H. Schelke	Mrs. James Badame	2:06.00
1932	Magyar	3	Frank W. Munden	James Badame	Hope Goddard Iselin	2:05.00
1931	Flaming	4	Anthony Pascuma	Roy Waldron	Belair Stable	2:08.40
1930	Sun Beau	5	Frank Coltiletti	George Tappin	Willis Sharpe Kilmer	2:05.80
1929	Gaffsman	6	Whitey Abel	A. Crawford	Seagram Stable	2:06.20
1928	Display	5	John Maiben	Thomas J. Healey	Walter J. Salmon Sr.	2:08.00
1927	Gaffsman	4	Ovila Bourassa	William H. Bringloe	Seagram Stable	2:04.40
1926	Edisto	4	Henry Erickson	William H. Bringloe	Seagram Stable	2:07.00
1925	Horologe	6	Francis Horn	J. Murphy	Joaquin Stable	2:06.20
1924	Hallucination	4	Pete Walls	Henry McDaniel	J. K. L. Ross	2:04.80
1923	My Dear	6	Pete Walls	Fred Musante	Fred Musante	2:05.40
1922	Exterminator	7	Albert Johnson	Eugene Wayland	Willis Sharpe Kilmer	2:05.20
1921	Exterminator	6	Willie Kelsay	Willie Knapp	Willis Sharpe Kilmer	2:05.20
1920	Exterminator	5	Charles Fairbrother	Henry McDaniel	Willis Sharpe Kilmer	2:04.40
1916	Rancher	4	William Obert	John Walters	George M. Hendrie	2:07.80
1915	Rancher	3	J. Smyth	John Walters	George M. Hendrie	2:05.60
1914	Great Britain	4	J. Metcalfe	John Walters	George M. Hendrie	2:05.60
1913	Great Britain	3	William Obert	John Walters	George M. Hendrie	2:05.40
1912	Star Charter	4	Fred Teahan	John F. Schorr	John W. Schorr	2:06.20
1911	Plate Glass	5	Charles Peak	Jacob Byer	P. S. P. Randolph	2:04.80
1910	Sager	3	Phil Musgrave	J. Powers	Barney Schrieber	2:07.60
1909	Bouquet	4	Phil Musgrave	Barry Littlefield	Joseph E. Seagram	2:06.20
1908	Bouquet	3	Phil Musgrave	Barry Littlefield	Joseph E. Seagram	2:06.60
1907	Edwin Gum	4	Mr. Lycurgus	William "Red" Walker	William "Red" Walker	2:07.00
1906	Solon Shingle	5	George Mountain	A. Stansbury	A. W. C. Gardner	2:06.00
1905	Sir Ralph	3	John K. Treubel	T. Clark	T. Clark	2:05.20
1904	Claude	4	W. Daly	Michael J. Daly	Michael J. Daly	2:09.20
1903	Rough Rider	6	T. Walsh	Michael J. Daly	P. S. Roberts	2:10.00
1902	Janice	4	Johnny Daly	Green B. Morris	Green B. Morris	1:58.00

== See also ==
- List of Canadian flat horse races
