= Thorncliffe Stable =

Thorncliffe Stable is a defunct Thoroughbred and Standardbred horse racing and breeding operation established in 1888 in Toronto, Ontario by businessman Robert T. Davies. The stable was based at Davies' Thorn Cliff Farm in the Don River Valley in what is now known as Thorncliffe Park. Yellow and black were the stable's racing colours.

When Robert Davies died in 1916 his sons, Robert, George, Wilfred and Melville took over the racing operation but sold the Thorncliffe farm property to a group of investors from Baltimore, Maryland who built Thorncliffe Park Raceway.

During its existence, Thorncliffe Stable won numerous important races in Ontario including the:

- Coronation Futurity (1921, 1922, 1928, 1932)
- Queen's Plate (1922, 1929)
- Breeders' Stakes (1923, 1930, 1933)
- Durham Cup Stakes (1925)
- Clarendon Stakes (1928)

The stable's final success came in 1935 when the Thorncliffe-bred filly Sally Fuller won the King's Plate for Seagram Stables.
