= Robert B. Watson =

Canadian horse jockey (1913–1997)

Bobby Watson
Personal information
- Born: 1913 Aberdeen, Scotland
- Died: 1997 (aged 83–84)
- Occupation: Jockey

Horse racing career
- Sport: Horse racing
- Career wins: 1,300+

Major racing wins
- Philadelphia Handicap (1935); Autumn Handicap (1939, 1942, 1945); Clarendon Stakes (1939, 1944, 1947); Maple Leaf Stakes (1939); Seagram Cup Handicap (1939); Jockey Club Cup Handicap (1939); Coronation Futurity Stakes (1941, 1944); Durham Cup Handicap (1941, 1944); Canadian Championship (1942, 1943, 1944); My Dear Stakes (1942, 1948); Cup and Saucer Stakes (1944); Plate Trial Stakes (1945); Princess Elizabeth Stakes (1947); Victoria Stakes (1947, 1952); Woodstock Stakes (1952) Canadian Classic Race wins: King's Plate (1941, 1944, 1945); Prince of Wales Stakes (1944, 1945); Breeders' Stakes (1942, 1943, 1945, 1947)

Honours
- Canadian Horse Racing Hall of Fame (1998)

Significant horses
- Shepperton, Budpath, Acara, Uttermost

Robert B. Watson (1913–1997) was a Canadian Horse Racing Hall of Fame jockey. He was born in Aberdeen, Scotland, the son of Helen Booth and her husband, Alexander Watson. In his youth, the family emigrated to Canada where they settled in the city of Toronto, Ontario where Alexander Watson became involved in Thoroughbred racing. Alexander's sister, Georgina, married Ross Robertson, and they too emigrated to the United States. Their son, Alfred Robertson, was also a highly successful jockey who was inducted in the U.S. Racing Hall of Fame.

In 1937, amidst rumours of race-fixing, Bobby Watson was one several jockeys whose licence was revoked by the Canadian Racing Association for what was deemed to be "suspicious behaviour." Reinstated, in 1939 he began winning important races at Old Woodbine Race Course and, according to his induction biography at the Canadian Horse Racing Hall of Fame, "Watson absolutely dominated horse racing in Ontario in the 1940s."

Watson won a total of nine of the Classic races that would later form the official Canadian Triple Crown series including all three in 1945 aboard Uttermost. As well, he is the only three-time winner of the prestigious Canadian Championship, doing it in consecutive years.

Bobby Watson retired from riding in the 1950s, ending a career that spanned more than 25 years. He served as an Ontario racing steward for the Jockey Club of Canada in the 1970s and 1980s.
