= Parkwood Stable =

Parkwood Stable was a thoroughbred racing stable founded in the early 1930s, located at Conlin Road and Simcoe Street North a few miles north of Oshawa, Ontario, Canada. Owned by the wealthy automobile maker Col. Sam McLaughlin, a long-time director of the Ontario Jockey Club, the stable was a significant force in Canadian thoroughbred horse racing whose racing silks and trophies won are on display at the Canadian Horse Racing Hall of Fame in Toronto.

McLaughlin and his stable won Canada's most prestigious race three times, capturing the King's Plates with Moldy and Hall of Fame inductees, Kingarvie and Horometer. The stable's notable wins include all the races that make up the current Canadian Triple Crown.

== Major race wins ==
- Clarendon Stakes (1932, 1933, 1934, 1939, 1945)
- Coronation Futurity Stakes (1933, 1936, 1943, 1945)
- Grey Breeders' Cup Stakes (1933, 1935, 1938, 1945)
- King's Plates (1934, 1946, 1947)
- Victoria Stakes (1934, 1939, 1946)
- Breeders' Stakes (1934, 1950)
- Durham Cup Stakes (1938, 1949)
- King Edward Stakes (1939, 1941, 1947)
- Cup and Saucer Stakes (1940, 1943, 1945)
- Peter Pan Stakes (1942)
- Plate Trial Stakes (1946)
- Prince of Wales Stakes (1950)

In 1950, Col. McLaughlin dissolved his racing stable and sold the property to E. P. Taylor who renamed it The National Stud of Canada.
