= Horometer =

Canadian-bred Thoroughbred racehorse

- Sire: Hourless
- Grandsire: Negofol
- Dam: Star Pal
- Damsire: North Star
- Sex: Gelding
- Foaled: 1931
- Country: Canada
- Colour: Dark Bay/Brown
- Breeder: Col. Sam McLaughlin
- Owner: Parkwood Stable
- Trainer: Harry Giddings, Jr.
- Record: 9: 8-1-0
- Earnings: $14,605

Major wins
- Goodwood Plate (1933); Clarendon Stakes (1933); Coronation Futurity Stakes (1933); Grey Stakes Handicap (1933) Canadian Classic Race wins: Queen's Plate (1934); Breeders' Stakes (1934)

Honours
- Canadian Horse Racing Hall of Fame (1976)
- Last updated on July 15, 2008

Horometer (1931–1935) was a Canadian Hall of Fame Thoroughbred racehorse. Bred and raced by Col. Sam McLaughlin's Parkwood Stable, he was out of the mare Star Pal and sired by Hourless, the 1917 American Co-Champion 3-Yr-Old Male Horse and winner of the Belmont Stakes.

Trained by Canadian Hall of Fame trainer Harry Giddings, Jr., Horometer was ridden by future Canadian Hall of Fame jockey Frankie Mann throughout his career. Racing at age two, he won all five of his starts and at age three broke the King's Plate race record by a second in winning Canada's most prestigious race. In an era when horses often raced once a week or even more often, just four days after Horometer won the King's Plate, he claimed victory in the Breeders' Stakes. Three days after that, he was sent to the track again and suffered the only loss of his career when he finished second by a nose in the William Hendrie Memorial Handicap. In his final race in June 1934, Horometer won the Canadian Breeders' Handicap at the now-defunct Long Branch Racetrack in Toronto but came out of the race with an injury and, after apparently recovering, went lame following a training workout.

According to the Canadian Horse Racing Hall of Fame, in 1935 jockey Frankie Mann said, "In those days they weren't able to repair a horse's foot like they can today, so he'd had it. He [Horometer] was a gelding and had no stud value, so they put him down."

Horometer was part of the inaugural class inducted into the Canadian Horse Racing Hall of Fame on its formation in 1976.

== See also ==
- List of leading Thoroughbred racehorses
