= Ascot Racecourse (disambiguation) =

Ascot Racecourse is a racecourse in Ascot, Berkshire, United Kingdom.

Ascot Racecourse may also refer to:

- Ascot Racecourse Heliport, Ascot, Berkshire
- Ascot Racecourse (Western Australia)
- Ascot Racecourse, Sydney
- Doomben Racecourse and Eagle Farm Racecourse in the Brisbane suburb of Ascot

== See also ==
- Ascot Park (disambiguation)
