= Barry Littlefield =

Canadian horse trainer

Personal information
- Born: June 16, 1871 Preakness, New Jersey, U.S.
- Died: June 14, 1936 (aged 64)
- Occupation: Trainer

Horse racing career
- Sport: Horse racing
- Career wins: Not found

Major racing wins
- Fall Handicap (1901); Autumn Maiden Stakes (1902); Autumn Stakes (1908, 1909); Coronation Futurity Stakes (1904, 1906, 1908, 1916, 1917); Durham Cup Stakes (1906, 1908, 1909, 1910); King Edward Gold Cup (1906, 1907, 1908) Canadian Classic Race wins: King's Plate (1905, 1906, 1908, 1916, 1917); Breeders' Stakes (1906, 1907, 1908, 1909, 1916)

Honours
- Canadian Horse Racing Hall of Fame (2000)

Significant horses
- Belle Mahone, Inferno, Mandarin, Seismic, Slaughter
- Updated on February 28, 2007

Barak Thomas "Barry" Littlefield (June 16, 1871 – June 14, 1936) was an American-born Canadian Horse Racing Hall of Fame Thoroughbred racehorse trainer.

From a Canadian mother, he was born in Preakness in what is now Wayne, New Jersey, where his American father Charles Stuart Littlefield (1833–1915), was employed by Milton Holbrook Sanford's Preakness Stables. His father worked as a jockey in Toronto and is also an inductee of the Canadian Horse Racing Hall of Fame who won the first ever edition of the Queen's Plate in 1860 and again in 1862 and as a trainer, won the 1885 Preakness Stakes. His brother, Fred Littlefield, was a jockey who won the 1888 Preakness Stakes. Nicknamed Barry, his father named him after a close friend, Major Barak G. Thomas, a lawyer and American Civil War officer who established Dixiana Farm in Lexington, Kentucky in 1887 where he bred such horses as United States Racing Hall of Fame inductee Domino and owned the 1893 Leading sire in North America, Himyar.

Between 1902 and 1917, Barry Littlefield trained for the successful racing stable owned by the Waterloo, Ontario distilling magnate, Joseph E. Seagram. Littlefield was a multiple winner of every top Canadian flat race of his era including five editions of the country's most prestigious event, the King's Plate (Queen's Plate).

After retiring from racing, Barry Littlefield returned to be near family members in his native New Jersey where he died in 1936. In 2000, he was inducted into the Canadian Horse Racing Hall of Fame.
