= Sandra Seagram =

Canadian socialite

Sandra Seagram Annovazzi was a Canadian socialite from the Seagram family.

== Biography ==
Seagram was born into a wealthy Canadian distilling family. Her father, Philip Frowde Seagram, was a captain in the 48th Highlanders of Canada and, when he was killed on 8 March 1941, became the first officer of that regiment to be killed in action in World War II. Her mother, Martha Elizabeth Telfer, died two and a half months after Sandra's father was killed. Her paternal grandfather was Edward F. Seagram, son of Joseph E. Seagram, the founder of Seagram's distillery.

After her parents' deaths, she was raised by her paternal uncle Campbell Seagram. She was educated at Branksome Hall, a private girls' school in Toronto.

On 17 July 1958, when she was 20 years old, Seagram became the last debutante to be presented at the Court of St James's. Her mother and grandmother had been presented before her. She curtsied to Queen Elizabeth the Queen Mother – deputizing for an ill Queen Elizabeth II – and Prince Philip, Duke of Edinburgh, at Buckingham Palace. She was one of 1,400 debutantes presented that season.

In 1959, Seagram married Italian Eugenio Annovazzi and settled in Rome. They have two children. She died on September 9, 2026, at her home in Rome, Italy.
