= Chain Reaction (horse) =

Canadian-bred Thoroughbred racehorse

- Sire: Chop Chop
- Grandsire: Flares
- Dam: Erstwhile
- Damsire: Helter Skelter
- Sex: Stallion
- Foaled: 1950
- Country: Canada
- Colour: Bay
- Breeder: Gil Darlington
- Owner: Elodie Sully Tomlinson
- Trainer: Richard Townrow
- Record: 30: 16-2-3
- Earnings: Can$63,752

Major wins
- Prince of Wales Stakes (1953); Breeders' Stakes (1953); Quebec Queen's Plate (1953); Canadian Derby (1953); Speers Handicap (1953); Achievement Handicap (1953); Durham Cup Handicap (1953); Whittier Park Handicap (1953); Canadian Maturity Stakes (1954); Dominion Day Handicap (1954); Connaught Cup Handicap (1954); King Edward Gold Cup (1954)
- Last updated on February 16, 2010

Chain Reaction (foaled 1950 in Ontario) was a Canadian Thoroughbred racehorse who in 1953 won two of the three races that would become part of the Canadian Triple Crown series and who set and equaled two track records.

== Background ==
A son of Canadian Horse Racing Hall of Fame inductee Chop Chop, Chain Reaction was bred by Gil Darlington at his Trafalgar Farm near Oakville, Ontario. Purchased by Joseph Tomlinson, he was raced under his wife's name, Elodie Sully Tomlinson. In 1951, the Tomlinsons won the Quebec King's Plate with their gelding Mount Branca. A highly successful businessman, Joseph E. Tomlinson had interests in shipping and was a shareholder in Hollywood's MGM Studios. The couple maintained a home in Oakville, Ontario as well as a mansion in the Bahamas known as "High Tor" which they purchased from Sir Oliver Simmonds in 1963.

== Racing career ==
Conditioned for racing by trainer Richard Townrow, at age three Chain Reaction ran seventh in the 1953 Queen's Plate at Old Woodbine in Toronto. For the year, he won several top races in Ontario, Manitoba, and Quebec, including the July 25 Quebec Queen's Plate at Blue Bonnets Raceway in Montreal. In the edition that marked the Centennial of the Quebec Queen's Plate, only four horses raced against Chain Reaction. The colt won easily under American jockey Nick Combest. Among his other wins, Chain Reaction captured the Prince of Wales Stakes and Breeders' Stakes, which in 1959 became the final two legs of the Canadian Triple Crown. In winning the 1953 Durham Cup Handicap, Chain Reaction set a track record for a mile and a quarter.

As a four-year-old, Chain Reaction continued to win some of the top races for older horses in Canada and equaled the Old Woodbine track record for a mile and an eighth in winning the 1954 Dominion Day Handicap
