= Seagram's Distillery =

Coordinates: 38°12′55.5″N 85°46′59.7″W

The Seagram's Distillery (also known as the Calvert Distillery) is a historic building complex in Louisville, Kentucky, on Seventh Street Road. It was originally constructed between 1933 and 1936 for the production of bourbon whiskey by Distillers Corporation Limited, who acquired Joseph E. Seagram & Sons (later renamed to The Seagram Company Ltd.) in 1928. The Seagram company has since ceased operation, and its assets were acquired by other companies, notably The Coca-Cola Company, Diageo, and Pernod Ricard.

== Background ==
Following the end of Prohibition in 1933, many distilleries began to reopen. New distilleries were constructed in an area southwest of Louisville known then as St. Helens. The city of Louisville was understandably eager to annex the lucrative St. Helens area, but in 1938 the Kentucky General Assembly passed a bill requiring that at least 50% of the residents of an incorporated area approve annexation by a "Class I" city (a definition which included only Louisville). Two months later, this area, including all of the distilleries, was incorporated as Shively, ending Louisville's annexation attempt.

== Design and historical use ==
The complex was designed by Louisville architectural firm Joseph & Joseph. The main office building was built in 1933 in the Regency revival style, and served as Seagram's headquarters for the state of Kentucky. The Art deco brick warehouses were constructed in 1936, and included a system of tunnels so that barrels of bourbon could be moved around the complex without being seen by the public.

The Seagrams landscape was cultivated into a wide green campus, complete with mature trees.

Seagram's Distillery was officially opened in May 1937 during the week of the Kentucky Derby to a crowd of 71,000 people. Seagram's claimed it was the largest distillery in the world at that time.

Vice president Samuel Bronfman hired Frederick Willkie, brother of former Republican nominee for the 1940 presidential election Wendell L. Willkie to be in charge of production. Seagram's products at the time included Seagram's Seven Crown and Kessler Whiskey. The complex also produced industrial alcohol during World War II for the production of synthetic rubber and medicines.

Seagram's closed the distillery in 1983.

== Current use ==
Paul Hornung and Frank Metts bought the old distillery complex, sold half, and kept the other half to establish Golden Foods/Golden Brands (which has since been bought by Aarhuskarlshamn, a company in the same market), a vegetable oil and shortening company. Seagram's former headquarters is occupied by Dismas Charities. Other occupants include Parallel Products and Kentuckiana Tank Wash.

== See also ==
- History of Louisville, Kentucky
