= Ascot Park =

Ascot Park can refer to:

- Ascot Park (speedway) – dirt racing track in Gardena, California
- Ascot Park, New Zealand – suburb in Porirua, New Zealand
- Ascot Park, South Australia – place in Adelaide, South Australia
- Ascot Park (race track) – a defunct horse racing facility in Akron, Ohio
