= Kingarvie =

Canadian-bred Thoroughbred racehorse

- Sire: Teddy Wrack
- Grandsire: Bull Dog
- Dam: Forsworn
- Damsire: Bachelor's Double
- Sex: Gelding
- Foaled: 1943
- Country: Canada
- Colour: Chestnut
- Breeder: Woodlands Investments Ltd.
- Owner: Parkwood Stable
- Trainer: Arthur Brent
- Record: 169: 30-21-27
- Earnings: $100,315

Major wins
- Coronation Futurity Stakes (1945); Mrs. Orpen's Cup And Saucer Handicap (1945); Clarendon Plate (1945); Plate Trial Stakes (1946); Canadian Championship Stakes (1946); King Edward Gold Cup (1947); Hallandale Handicap (1947); Cattarinich Memorial Handicap (1950) Canadian Classic Race wins: King's Plate (1946)

Honours
- Canadian Horse Racing Hall of Fame (1976); Kingarvie Stakes at Woodbine Racetrack

Kingarvie (1943–1955) was a Canadian Hall of Fame Thoroughbred racehorse. Owned and bred by the renowned automobile pioneer, Col. Sam McLaughlin, he was out of the mare, Forsworn. He was sired by Teddy Wrack who was a son of Bull Dog, a Champion American sire whose progeny included the very important Bull Lea.

Trained by Arthur Brent, in his first two races at age two Kingarvie was beaten by fellow future Hall of Fame inductee, Windfields. He then went on a ten-race winning streak that extended into 1946 which included the 87th running of the King's Plate when jockey Johnny Dewhurst rode him to victory. The King's Plate is Canada's most prestigious race.

A gelding, Kingarvie continued racing until 1953 when he was retired at age ten. He retired as the first Canadian horse to earn $100,000.

In January 1955, Kingarvie suffered injuries during training at Gulfstream Park and had to be euthanized. In 1976 he was part of the inaugural class inducted in the Canadian Horse Racing Hall of Fame.
