= Charles W. Boland =

Canadian jockey

Charles William Boland (January 29, 1940 – May 5, 1961) was a Canadian jockey in thoroughbred horse racing who died as a result of a racing accident.

Born in Old Chelsea, Quebec, he competed at racetracks in his native Province as well as in Ontario. Among his racing wins, in the 1960 Durham Cup Stakes at Woodbine Racetrack, Charles Boland notably rode Windy Ship to victory over the Canadian Triple Crown champion, New Providence.

On May 5, 1961, Boland was competing at Fort Erie Race Track. After winning the feature race of the day he suffered a fatal head injury during a race as a result of an accident that saw him thrown from his horse, Wyvern. The twenty-one-year-old jockey died the next day in hospital.
