= Preakness, New Jersey =

Populated place in Passaic County, New Jersey, US

- Census-designated place
- Location in Passaic County Location in New Jersey Location in the United States
- Coordinates: 40°55′49″N 74°13′40″W
- Country: United States
- State: New Jersey
- County: Passaic
- Township: Wayne

Area
  - Total: 5.70 sq mi (14.77 km^{2})
  - Land: 5.68 sq mi (14.70 km^{2})
  - Water: 0.027 sq mi (0.07 km^{2})
- Elevation: 213 ft (65 m)

Population (2020)
  - Total: 18,487
  - Density: 3,258.2/sq mi (1,258.0/km^{2})
- Time zone: UTC−05:00 (Eastern (EST))
  - Summer (DST): UTC−04:00 (Eastern (EDT))
- ZIP Code: 07470
- FIPS code: 34-60810
- GNIS feature ID: 0879476

Preakness is an unincorporated community located within Wayne in Passaic County, in the U.S. state of New Jersey. As of the 2020 census, Preakness had a population of 18,487.

The colt Preakness, after whom the Preakness Stakes Thoroughbred horse race at Pimlico Race Course in Baltimore, Maryland is named, was owned by Milton H. Sanford's Preakness Stables located at the corner of Valley Road and Preakness Avenue.

Preakness is the birthplace of Canadian Horse Racing Hall of Fame trainer, Barry Littlefield and his brother Fred Littlefield, a jockey who won the 1888 Preakness Stakes.

The name itself was said to have come from the Native American Minisi name Pra-qua-les for "Quail Woods" in the area. An alternative translation derives the name from per-ukunees, which is thought to mean "young buck".

== Demographics ==
Historical population
Census	Pop.	Note	%±
2020	18,487		—
U.S. Decennial Census; 2020

Preakness was first listed as a census designated place in the 2020 U.S. census.

=== 2020 census ===
As of the 2020 census, Preakness had a population of 18,487. The median age was 45.6 years. 19.0% of residents were under the age of 18 and 22.9% of residents were 65 years of age or older. For every 100 females there were 89.4 males, and for every 100 females age 18 and over there were 85.2 males age 18 and over.

100.0% of residents lived in urban areas, while 0.0% lived in rural areas.

There were 7,050 households in Preakness, of which 28.2% had children under the age of 18 living in them. Of all households, 54.9% were married-couple households, 13.4% were households with a male householder and no spouse or partner present, and 27.8% were households with a female householder and no spouse or partner present. About 28.3% of all households were made up of individuals and 17.2% had someone living alone who was 65 years of age or older.

There were 7,182 housing units, of which 1.8% were vacant. The homeowner vacancy rate was 0.7% and the rental vacancy rate was 1.8%.

Racial composition as of the 2020 census
Race	Number	Percent
White	13,993	75.7%
Black or African American	374	2.0%
American Indian and Alaska Native	24	0.1%
Asian	2,023	10.9%
Native Hawaiian and Other Pacific Islander	5	0.0%
Some other race	697	3.8%
Two or more races	1,371	7.4%
Hispanic or Latino (of any race)	2,136	11.6%

Preakness CDP, New Jersey – Racial and ethnic composition Note: the US Census treats Hispanic/Latino as an ethnic category. This table excludes Latinos from the racial categories and assigns them to a separate category. Hispanics/Latinos may be of any race.
Race / Ethnicity (NH = Non-Hispanic)	Pop 2020	2020
White alone (NH)	13,467	72.85%
Black or African American alone (NH)	357	1.93%
Native American or Alaska Native alone (NH)	11	0.06%
Asian alone (NH)	2,006	10.85%
Native Hawaiian or Pacific Islander alone (NH)	0	0.00%
Other race alone (NH)	65	0.35%
Mixed race or Multiracial (NH)	445	2.41%
Hispanic or Latino (any race)	2,136	11.55%
Total	18,487	100.00%
