= Zaha =

Zaha is both a surname and a given name. Notable people with the name include:

- Alin Zaha (born 1977), Romanian footballer, plays for Bad Hersfeld, has played for various Romanian clubs
- Wilfried Zaha (born 1992), Ivorian-English footballer, plays for Crystal Palace and Ivory Coast, has played for England
- Zaha Hadid (1950–2016), architect
- Zaha Waheed, Maldivian politician
- Zaha, a fashion brand founded by Pakistani designer Khadijah Shah
