= Brian Swatuk =

Canadian jockey (1949–2014)

Personal information
- Born: 9 July 1949 Toronto, Ontario, Canada
- Died: 13 December 2014 (aged 65) Ontario, Canada
- Occupation: Jockey

Horse racing career
- Sport: Horse racing
- Career wins: 1,679

Major racing wins
- Queen's Plate (1979); Prince of Wales Stakes (1987); Breeders' Stakes (1985); E. P. Taylor Stakes (1979); Canadian Stakes (1970, 1978, 1979); Maple Leaf Stakes (1969, 1975, 1982, 1983, 1984); Princess Elizabeth Stakes (1968, 1978, 1990); King Edward Stakes (1981, 1985); Nearctic Stakes (1982, 1990); Woodbine Oaks (1982); Coronation Futurity Stakes (1990); Cup and Saucer Stakes (1990); Summer Stakes (1990)

Significant horses
- Steady Growth; Rainbows for Life

Brian Swatuk (9 July 1949 – 13 December 2014) was a Canadian jockey in Thoroughbred horse racing. He won several Canadian classics, most notably the Queen's Plate in 1979, and the Prince of Wales Stakes in 1987. Swatuk died from cancer on 13 December 2014 in an Ontario hospice. He was 65.
