= Laurie Gulas =

Laura Lynn Gulas (born February 16, 1969) is a retired jockey who competed between the early 1990s to late 2000s. As a graded stakes race competitor, Gulas won one Grade III event in 1994 and one Grade II event in 2002. During 1999, Gulas was "the first woman to win a Canadian Triple Crown race" upon her win at the Breeders' Stakes. As part of the Canadian Triple Tiara, Gulas also won the Wonder Where Stakes that year. After ending her jockeying career in 2007, she had 339 wins and over $8 million in prize winnings.

== Early life and education ==
Gulas was born February 16, 1969, in Welland, Ontario. Growing up, she was interested in horse racing while attending elementary school. As a child, she played on a minor ice hockey team. Before she studied horses in Toronto for her education, Gulas was a groom in Fort Erie during her teens. As an adult, Gulas attended Stratford Career Institute for a veterinary medicine program.

== Career ==
In 1990, Gulas went to Woodbine Racetrack to begin her jockey career. The following year, Gulas had her first Canadian race victories during her apprenticeship. She fractured her pelvis and injured her shoulder in 1992. Gulas continued to compete until her injuries made her withdraw from racing for a couple of months.

Outside of Fort Erie, Gulas competed at events in California from 1992 to 1993. During these two years, some racecourses Gulas had victories at include Hollywood Park Racetrack and Santa Anita Park. At the 1994 Eclipse Handicap, Gulas won her first graded stakes race during the Grade III event. Gulas briefly stopped competing in 1996 after she had a hip fracture.

During her August 1999 debut at the Breeders' Stakes jockey, Gulas was "the first woman to win a Canadian Triple Crown race". As part of the Canadian Triple Tiara, Gulas also won the Wonder Where Stakes in October 1999. That year, Gulas hurt her neck and head. While occasionally racing in 2000, Gulas experienced multiple concussions and had surgery to repair a fractured collarbone.

Gulas resumed her racing career in July 2001. At Grade II events, Gulas won the 2002 Chinese Cultural Center Stakes. That year, Gulas was tenth at the Woodbine Oaks as part of the Canadian Triple Tiara. After competing in races during 2003, she did not race from 2004 to 2006.

During 2007, Gulas had a concussion before she ended jockeying that year. Throughout her career, Gulas had 339 wins and over $8 million in prize winnings. In the late 2010s, she was working at a Florida stable.

== Personal life ==
During the 2000s, Gulas used drugs for pain management and had mental illness. To treat her drug use, she underwent drug rehabilitation and group therapy. In the 2010s, Gulas was in jail for drug trafficking before she released in 2017. Gulas has a child and is married.
