= Maple Leaf Stakes =

- Class: Grade III Stakes
- Location: Woodbine Racetrack; Toronto, Ontario
- Inaugurated: 1892
- Race type: Thoroughbred - Flat racing
- Website: www.woodbineentertainment.com/qct/default.asp

Race information
- Distance: 1 1/4 miles (10 furlongs)
- Surface: Polytrack
- Track: left-handed
- Qualification: Fillies & Mares, 3-Years-Old & Up
- Weight: Allowances
- Purse: $150,000

The Maple Leaf Stakes is a Thoroughbred horse race run annually at Woodbine Racetrack in Toronto, Ontario, Canada. Run during the first part of November, the Grade III Maple Leaf is open to fillies aged three or older. Raced over a distance of one and one-quarter miles on Polytrack synthetic dirt, it currently offers a purse of $150,000.

Inaugurated in 1892, the Maple Leaf Stakes has been competed at a variety of distances. Since 1956, when the new Woodbine Racetrack hosted the event, the race distance have been set as follows:

- 1 1/16 miles : 1956-1958 at Woodbine Racetrack, 1959 and 1965 at Greenwood Raceway
- 1 mile : 1960-1964 at Greenwood Raceway
- 1 1/4 miles : 1966-1993 at Greenwood Raceway and since 1994 at Woodbine Racetrack

== Records ==
Speed record: (at current distance of 1 1/4 miles)

- 2:02.18 - Pachattack (2010)

Most wins:

- 2 - Tattling (1926, 1927)
- 2 - Shady Well (1932, 1933)
- 2 - Passa Grille (1941, 1942)
- 2 - Floral Gift (1945, 1946)
- 2 - Teddy's Sister (1951, 1952)
- 2 - Golden Turkey (1961, 1962)
- 2 - Hinemoa (1966, 1967)
- 2 - Not To Shy (1969, 1970)
- 2 - Lovely Sunrise (1974, 1975)
- 2 - Bye Bye Paris (1976, 1977)
- 2 - Sintrillium (1983, 1984)
- 2 - Wings of Erin (1995, 1996)
- 2 - One For Rose (2003, 2004)
- 2 - Sultana (2025, 2026)

Most wins by an owner:

- 7 - Conn Smythe (1959, 1969, 1970, 1974, 1975, 1976, 1977)
- 6 - William Hendrie (1891, 1894, 1896, 1899, 1900, 1902)

Most wins by a jockey:

- 5 - Brian Swatuk (1969, 1975, 1982, 1983, 1984)

Most wins by a trainer:

- 6 - Donnie Walker (1969, 1970, 1974, 1975, 1976, 1977)
- Pat Remillard won the Maple Leaf Stakes four times as a jockey (1934,1936, 1942, 1949) and then again as a trainer in 1973.

== Winners of the Maple Leaf Stakes since 1959 ==
Year	Winner	Age	Jockey	Trainer	Owner	Time
2026	Sultana	5	Rafael Manuel Hernandez	Kevin Attard	Lou Donato, Theodore Manziaris, Paul Borrelli and Lanni Bloodstock	2:05.33
2025	Sultana	4	Rafael Manuel Hernandez	Kevin Attard	Lou Donato, Theodore Manziaris, Paul Borrelli and Lanni Bloodstock	2:05.72
2024	Elysian Field	4	Sahin Civaci	Mark E. Casse	Team Valor International & Gary Barber	2:02.14
2023	Millie Girl	5	Rafael M. Hernandez	Catherine Day Phillips	Kingfield Racing Stable, Braconcrest Inc. & Apricot Valley Thoroughbreds	2:03.53
2022	Il Malocchio	4	Sahin Civaci	Martin Drexler	Franco Meli	2:02.55
2021	Skygaze	5	Patrick Husbands	Mark E. Casse	Tracy Farmer	2:03.65
2020	Heavenly Cause	5	Rafael M. Hernandez	Mark E. Casse	Gary Barber & John C. Oxley	2:03.24
2019	Lift Up	5	Patrick Husbands	Michael Dickinson	Augustin Stable	2:04.23
2018	A. A. Azula's Arch	3	Omar Moreno	Kevin Attard	A & A Farms	2:05.23
2017	Gamble's Ghost	4	Eurico Rosa da Silva	Josie Carroll	Ivan Dalos	2:04.70
2016	Ice Festival	4	David Moran	Sid Attard	Stronach Stables	2:03.25
2015	Flipcup	4	Luis Contreras	William I. Mott	Team Penney/Wachtel Stable/Brous Stable	2:03.42
2014	Strut the Course	4	Luis Contreras	Barb Minshall	John Unger	2:02.74
2013	Moonlight Beauty	7	Gary Boulanger	John P. LeBlanc, Jr.	William Gierkink	2:04.89
2012	Smart Sting	4	Eurico Rosa da Silva	Roger Attfield	Stronach Stables	2:03.77
2011	Masked Maiden	3	Omar Moreno	Mark E. Casse	Nuckols Farm/D. Oxley	2:04.96
2010	Pachattack	4	Chantal Sutherland	Gerard Butler	M. V. Deegan	2:02.18
2009	Serenading	5	Patrick Husbands	Josie Carroll	Hill 'n' Dale Equine Holdings/Glenn Sikura	2:06.19
2008	Tell It as It Is	4	Emma-Jayne Wilson	James Smith	Cinnamont Stable	2:04.99
2007	Like A Gem	4	Emma-Jayne Wilson	Daniel J. Vella	Hillsbrook Farms	2:03.51
2006	Howaboutrightnow	3	Emma-Jayne Wilson	Mark E. Casse	Norm Casse	2:07.66
2005	Ballroom Deputy	4	Dino Luciani	Josie Carroll	Padua Stables	2:05.77
2004	One For Rose	5	Emile Ramsammy	Sid C. Attard	Tucci Stables	2:04.87
2003	One For Rose	4	Emile Ramsammy	Sid C. Attard	Tucci Stables	2:03.50
2002	Lady Shari	3	Constant Montpellier	David Cotey	Dominion Bloodstock	2:06.22
2001	Catch The Ring	4	Robert Landry	Mark Frostad	Sam-Son Farm	2:03.62
2000	On A Soapbox	4	Gary Boulanger	Niall O'Callaghan	Gary A. Tanaka	2:05.94
1999	With Flair	3	David Clark	Mark Frostad	Sam-Son Farm	2:05.54
1998	No Foul Play	4	Steve Bahen	Margaret Spencer	Margaret Spencer	2:06.20
1997	Blue and Red	5	Todd Kabel	Sid C. Attard	Jim Dandy Stable	2:04.60
1996	Wings of Erin	4	Jim McAleney	Thomas O'Keefe	Roberts / Matthews	2:09.00
1995	Wings of Erin	3	K. Willey	Thomas O'Keefe	Roberts / Matthews	2:02.60
1994	Smiles With A Fist	4	Dave Penna	Michelle Bonte	Gierkink / Bonte	2:05.80
1993	Dance For Donna	4	Robert Landry	Sherry Noakes	Aubrey W. Minshall	2:07.00
1992	Adorned	5	Robert Landry	Macdonald Benson	Windfields Farm	2:05.80
1991	Musical Respite	3	Daniel J. David	R. Wright	Sheehan Farms	2:06.40
1990	Star Standing	3	P. Johnson	Peter M. Vestal	M. J. Ryan	2:05.80
1989	One For Bert	4	Jim McAleney	John Cardella	M. & N. Nosowenko	2:07.60
1988	Arcroyal	4	Don Seymour	Roger Attfield	Kinghaven Farms	2:09.20
1987	Triple Wow	4	Don Seymour	Roger Attfield	Kinghaven Farms	2:08.20
1986	Gypsy Sunshine	3	Irwin Driedger	Gerry Belanger	Trillium Stable	2:08.60
1985	In My Cap	3	Irwin Driedger	James E. Day	Sam-Son Farm	2:07.00
1984	Sintrillium	6	Brian Swatuk	Conrad Cohen	Frank Stronach	2:08.80
1983	Sintrillium	5	Brian Swatuk	Conrad Cohen	Frank Stronach	2:10.60
1982	Eternal Search	4	Brian Swatuk	Edward Mann	Jim Dandy Stable	2:09.80
1981	Quantra	3	George HoSang	Jerry G. Lavigne	Paddockhurst Stable	2:07.80
1980	Orphanella	4	J. Paul Souter	A. Wick	Aubrey W. Minshall	2:05.80
1979	Glorious Song	3	John LeBlanc	Fred H. Loschke	Frank Stronach	2:08.80
1978	Male Strike	4	Jim Walford	John Cardella	M. M. Anaka	2:08.00
1977	Bye Bye Paris	4	Jeffrey Fell	Donnie Walker	Conn Smythe	2:05.40
1976	Bye Bye Paris	3	Jeffrey Fell	Donnie Walker	Conn Smythe	2:03.80
1975	Lovely Sunrise	4	Brian Swatuk	Donnie Walker	Conn Smythe	2:06.20
1974	Lovely Sunrise	3	John LeBlanc	Donnie Walker	Conn Smythe	2:04.00
1973	Musketeer Miss	3	John Bell	Pat Remillard	Mrs. J. A. McDougald	2:09.40
1972	Lauries Dancer	4	Sandy Hawley	James C. Bentley	Helen G. Stollery	2:07.60
1971	Page Me Doll	4	D. Thomas	Glenn Magnusson	J. W. Wright	2:05.20
1970	Not Too Shy	4	Sandy Hawley	Donnie Walker	Conn Smythe	2:10.60
1969	Not Too Shy	3	Brian Swatuk	Donnie Walker	Conn Smythe	2:05.20
1968	Hometown News	3	Richard Grubb	Gil Rowntree	Stafford Farms	2:07.40
1967	Hinemoa	4	Avelino Gomez	Paul Cooper	Doug Banks	2:06.40
1966	Hinemoa	3	Wayne Harris	Paul Cooper	Doug Banks	2:06.20
1965	Lady Victoria	3	Jim Fitzsimmons	R. Richards	Windfields Farm	1:45.60
1964	Ciboulette	3	Eric Walsh	Duke Campbell	Jean-Louis Levesque	1:39.40
1963	Court Royal	4	Jim Fitzsimmons	N. Julius	J. E. Frowde Seagram	1:40.00
1962	Golden Turkey	4	H. Bolin	Wilfrid L. Sayles	A. G. Hedges	1:41.60
1961	Golden Turkey	3	B. DeSpirito	Wilfrid L. Sayles	A. G. Hedges	1:38.20
1960	Skinny Minny	3	Al Coy	John Passero	William R. Beasley	1:38.20
1959	Wonder Where	3	Al Coy	Yonnie Starr	Maloney & Smythe	1:44.60

- In 1973 Sharp Quill finished first but was disqualified and set back to second.
- In 1994, Plenty Of Sugar finished first but was disqualified and set back to third.

== Earlier winners ==
- 1958 - Windy Answer
- 1957 - Turn Me Loose
- 1956 - Air Page
- 1955 - Festivity
- 1954 - June Brook
- 1953 - Winter Lady
- 1952 - Teddy's Sister
- 1951 - Teddy's Sister
- 1950 - Filsis
- 1949 - Tab Wales
- 1948 - Ascendant
- 1947 - Yellowknife
- 1946 - Floral Gift
- 1945 - Floral Gift
- 1944 - Sister Pat
- 1943 - Patruska
- 1942 - Passa Grille
- 1941 - Passa Grille
- 1940 - Koracan
- 1939 - Budsis
- 1938 - Mona Bell
- 1937 - Fore Isus
- 1936 - Ladymuch
- 1935 - Chickpen
- 1934 - Candy Feast
- 1933 - Shady Well
- 1932 - Shady Well
- 1931 - Step Off
- 1930 - Lindsay
- 1929 - Dance Circle
- 1928 - Best Bonnett
- 1927 - Tattling
- 1926 - Tattling
- 1925 - Tricky Take Off
- 1924 - Vrana
- 1923 - Prismar
- 1922 - Affectation
- 1921 - Sudor
- 1920 - Ostara
- 1915 - Lady Curzon
- 1914 - Dark Rosaleen
- 1913 - Sarolta
- 1912 - Amberite
- 1911 - Bride Lane
- 1910 - Frolic
- 1909 - Mendip
- 1908 - Cannie Maid
- 1907 - Sea Wall
- 1906 - Fair Havana
- 1905 - Maid of Barrie
- 1904 - Loupanga
- 1903 - Prodigality
- 1902 - Lyddite
- 1901 - Lady Berkley
- 1900 - Barley Sugar
- 1899 - Toddle Ladle
- 1898 - Violent
- 1897 - Downright
- 1896 - Melcha
- 1895 - Waterflow
- 1894 - Nancy Lee
- 1893 - Bonnie Bluff
- 1892 - Queen Mary

== See also ==
- List of Canadian flat horse races
