= Avelino Gomez =

Cuban jockey (1928–1980)

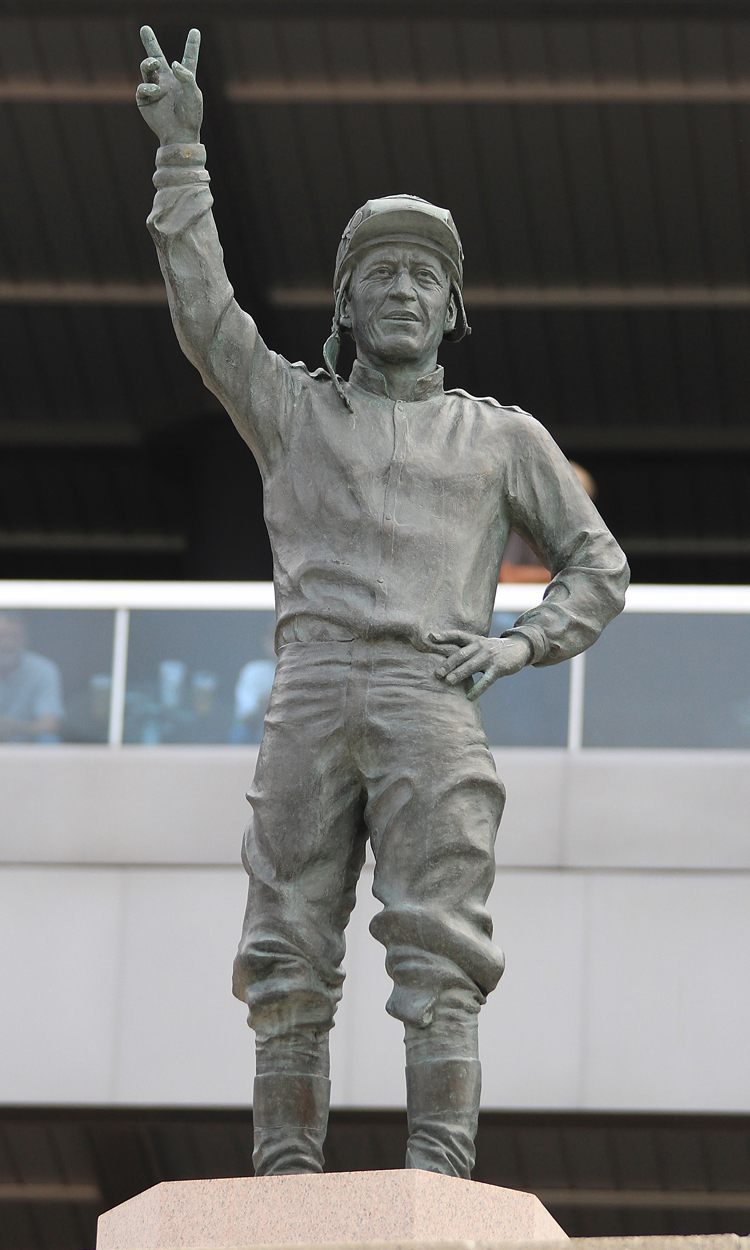
- Statue of Gomez at Woodbine Racetrack, 2012

Personal information
- Born: 1928 Havana, Cuba
- Died: 21 June 1980 (aged 51–52) Etobicoke, Ontario, Canada
- Occupation: Jockey

Horse racing career
- Sport: Horse racing
- Career wins: 4,081

Major racing wins
- Hawthorne Gold Cup Handicap (1951); Plate Trial Stakes (1955, 1957, 1959, 1960, 1961, 1964-1967); Autumn Cup Handicap (1955, 1959, 1966, 1967); Victoria Stakes (1956, 1960, 1966, 1967); Connaught Cup Stakes (1957, 1960, 1966); Cup and Saucer Stakes (1959, 1964, 1966); Colin Stakes (1960, 1966, 1976); Summer Stakes (1960, 1965, 1966, 1969, 1972); Dominion Day Stakes (1961, 1966); Roamer Handicap (1962); Round Table Handicap (1962); Stars and Stripes Handicap (1962); Coronation Futurity Stakes (1964, 1965, 1966, 1967, 1972); Grey Stakes (1965, 1966, 1967); Shady Well Stakes (1966, 1972, 1976, 1978); E. P. Taylor Stakes (1967, 1973); Frizette Stakes (1969) Canadian Triple Crown series: Queen's Plate (1957, 1960, 1966, 1969); Prince of Wales Stakes (1959, 1964); Breeders' Stakes (1959, 1966, 1967)

Racing awards
- Leading jockey at Woodbine Racetrack (1956, 1957, 1960, 1966, 1967); North American Champion Jockey by wins (1966); Sovereign Award for Outstanding Jockey (1977); Sovereign Award of Merit (1978)

Honours
- Canadian Horse Racing Hall of Fame (1977); United States Racing Hall of Fame (1982); Canada's Sports Hall of Fame (1990); Life-size statue at Woodbine Racetrack; Avelino Gomez Memorial Award

Significant horses
- Nearctic, New Providence, Lyford Cay, Victoria Park, Affectionately, Ridan, Ice Water, Dancer's Image; Titled Hero, Cool Reception
- Updated on March 2, 2007

Avelino Gomez (1928 – June 21, 1980) was a Cuban-born Hall of Fame jockey in American and Canadian thoroughbred horse racing.

== Biography ==
Born in 1928, in Havana, Gomez began a career as a jockey at the urging of a family member. He won his first race in Mexico City and later moved to the United States, where he built a reputation as a very capable rider, gaining considerable attention after winning six races during one racecard at Ascot Park in Akron, Ohio. He eventually began riding at Woodbine Racetrack in Toronto, Ontario, where he made his home and became a dominant force in racing for more than twenty years.

Canada's top jockey on seven occasions, in 1966, Gomez became the first jockey in Canadian racing history to win 300 races in a single season. His 318 wins that year were tops in North America. His win percentage of .32 for the 1966 season was the highest ever for a North American champion, a record that still stands. He was a four-time winner of Canada's most prestigious race, the Queen's Plate, and the winner of the 1977 Sovereign Award for Outstanding Jockey.

In 1978, Gomez was recognized with the Sovereign Award of Merit for his lifetime contribution to the sport. He was elected to the Canadian Horse Racing Hall of Fame in 1977, the U.S. National Museum of Racing and Hall of Fame in 1982, the Canada's Sports Hall of Fame in 1990, and the Ontario Sports Hall of Fame in 1997.

Gomez died of complications after a three-horse accident during the running of the Canadian Oaks in 1980. He had won 4,081 races with a 24% winning percentage.

The Avelino Gomez Memorial Award is given annually to the person, Canadian-born, Canadian-raised, or a regular rider in the country for more than five years, who has made significant contributions to the sport. A life-size statue of Gomez can be seen at Woodbine Racetrack.
