= Ascot Park (Ohio race track) =

Defunct horse racing facility in Akron, Ohio

Ascot Park was an American horse racing track located near Cuyahoga Falls, Summit County, Ohio.

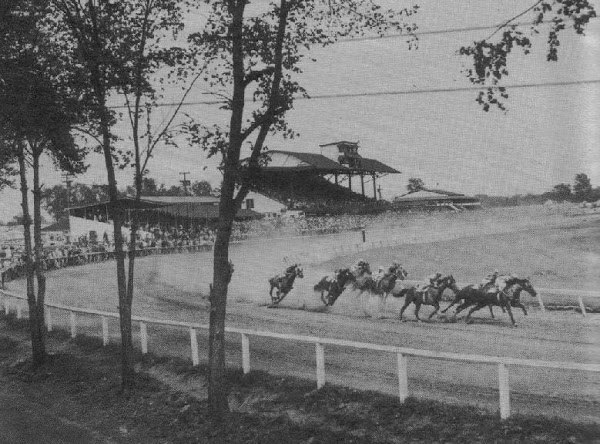
Ascot Park in Cuyahoga Falls, Ohio

Originally known as Northampton Park, the track was built in 1922 along Ohio State Route 8 on 63 acres of farmland. The unusual track was only 3/4 mile long. Three-quarter-mile tracks are proving exceptionally popular in Canada, having the advantage from a spectator's standpoint that in races of almost any official distances, the start is made near the grandstand, the Akron Beacon Journal reported in 1933. In addition, the three-quarter-mile track allows spectators to see the horses and jockeys clearly when on the backstretch. The track closed at the onset of the Great Depression, and was purchased out of receivership by Barberton businessman Bill Griffiths and his associates for $17,500.

The new owners renovated and reopened the facility in 1935 and changed the name to Ascot Park in 1938. They also created the two-mile Ascot Gold Cup race, that became the oldest continuously run stake in Ohio history. Cleveland businessman Horace Adams bought the track for $1.3 million in 1954 and spent another $900,000 for upgrades, resulting in a record 12,525 fans for opening day in 1955. When Adams died in 1966, the track changed hands several times, and was used for fairs, auctions, circuses, motorcycle races and pageants. By 1975 the track had become a safety hazard, so local firefighters burned down its grandstands and other buildings in 1976 as a training exercise. The site is part of a 200-acre industrial park.
