= Harry C. Hatch =

Canadian industrialist

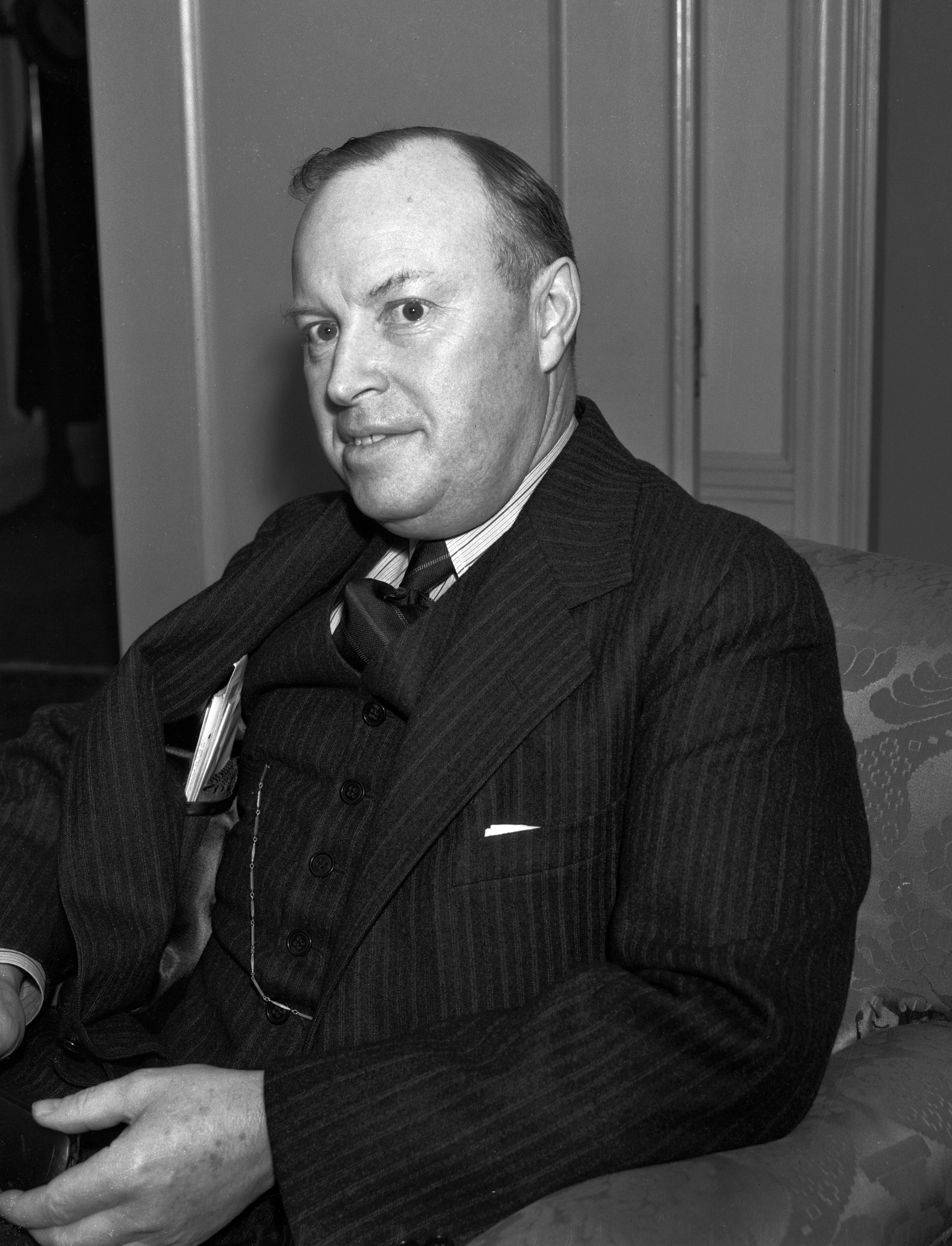
- Born: April 12, 1884; Ameliasburgh, Ontario, Canada
- Died: May 8, 1946; Toronto, Ontario, Canada
- Occupation(s): Businessman: Distillery & winery owner Racehorse owner/breeder

Harold Clifford "Harry" Hatch (1884–1946) was a millionaire industrialist from Prince Edward County, Ontario, specializing in the business of wine and spirits.

Hatch started out with a small liquor store in Whitby, Ontario, and prospered to the point where he was able to purchase the controlling interest of Gooderham & Worts Ltd. in 1923. Four years later, Hatch acquired Hiram Walker & Sons Ltd. based in Walkerville, Ontario, and in 1927 merged the two companies under the parent company of Hiram Walker-Gooderham & Worts Limited. The company was one of a number of Canadian distillers who prospered by shipping their products into the United States during the Prohibition era from 1920 to 1933.

In 1935, Harry Hatch oversaw Hiram Walker's acquisition of a 51% controlling interest in the H. Corby Distillery Limited. The following year he expanded the company's operation with the acquisition of George Ballantine & Son Ltd. of Glasgow, Scotland.

Hiram Walker was best known for marketing top-selling brands such as Canadian Club whisky and Ballantine's Scotch Whisky.

Hatch was also known for playing a significant role in the pioneering of the Canadian wine industry, most notably in the Niagara Peninsula of Southern Ontario, where Hatch became majority owner of T.G. Bright & Co. Limited in 1933. At that time Canadian wineries typically made only ports and sherries, but Hatch pursued the development of a dry table wine and invested company resources into experimenting with different grape varieties not traditionally found in Niagara.

== Thoroughbred horse racing ==
In 1927, Harry Hatch bought J.K.L. Ross's stable in Agincourt, Ontario and a year later bought Sweepster from Harry F. Sinclair's Rancocas Stable in Jobstown, New Jersey. Sweepster became one of the most successful sires in Canada, siring King's Plate winners Monsweep and Goldlure. Harry Hatch became one of the dominant owners and breeders of Thoroughbreds in Canada during the 1930s and 1940s. Among his many racing successes, in addition to Monsweep and Goldlure, he owned and bred three other King's Plate winners: Budpath, Acara, and Uttermost and owned three winners of the Canadian Derby.

Hatch owned and bred five King's Plate winners. The light and dark blue silks of his stable were in action throughout the U.S. In 1931 he was among the first Canadians to run a horse in the KentuckyDerby. A horse he imported from Argentina, Filisteo, set an American record in 1941 in the Exterminator Handicap at Pimlico and later sired Plate winner Collisteo. Hatch, who shied from publicity, always sent one of this three sons – Cliff, Doug or Carr – to receive the Plate trophy. In 2000, Hatch was posthumously inducted into the Canadian Horse Racing Hall of Fame as an industry builder.

Harry C. Hatch died on May 8, 1946, at the age of 62. He was succeeded in the distilling business by his son, H. Clifford Hatch. Harry Hatch was buried in Deseronto, Ontario, the town where he attended school and first worked (in his father's hotel). The farm ceased operations and sold to Robert McClintock Company and redeveloped as Bridlewood residential community in the 1960s.
