= Edward F. Seagram =

Edward Seagram
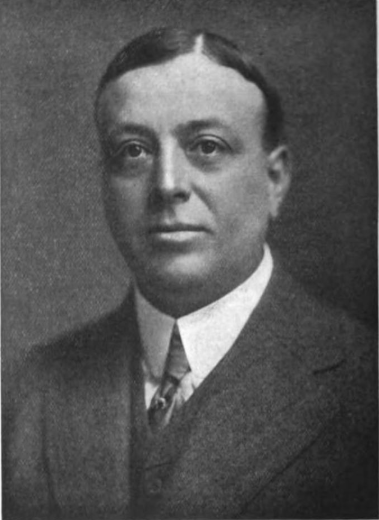
- Born: Edward Frowde Seagram; September 28, 1873; Waterloo, Ontario, Canada
- Died: February 1, 1937 (aged 63)
- Education: Lakefield Preparatory school, Trinity College, McGill University
- Occupations: Distiller, racehorse owner & breeder

Edward Frowde Seagram (September 28, 1873 – February 1, 1937) was a Canadian entrepreneur, philanthropist and politician in Ontario, Canada. He served as mayor of Waterloo from 1906 to 1907.

The son of distiller Joseph Emm Seagram and Stephanie Urbs, he was born in Waterloo and was educated at the Lakefield Preparatory school, Trinity College and McGill University. Seagram joined his father's business in 1894. Around 1910, he purchased the Globe Furniture Company, originally based in Walkerville, and moved it to Waterloo (Globe folded in 1968.). In 1920, Seagram became president of the distillery. That same year, he purchased Mueller Cooperage, renaming it Canadian Barrels and Kegs (later Canbar of Breslau).

Seagram was also interested in horse racing. He was president of the Ontario Jockey Club and of the Seagram Stables. His horses won the King's Plate in 1923, 1926, 1928 and 1933. He helped establish the Westmount Golf and Country Club and served as first president of its board of directors. He also contributed to the Waterloo Lawn Bowling Club.

His granddaughter Sandra Seagram was the last debutante presented at the Court of St James's.
