= Clarendon Stakes =

Horse race in Toronto, Ontario, Canada

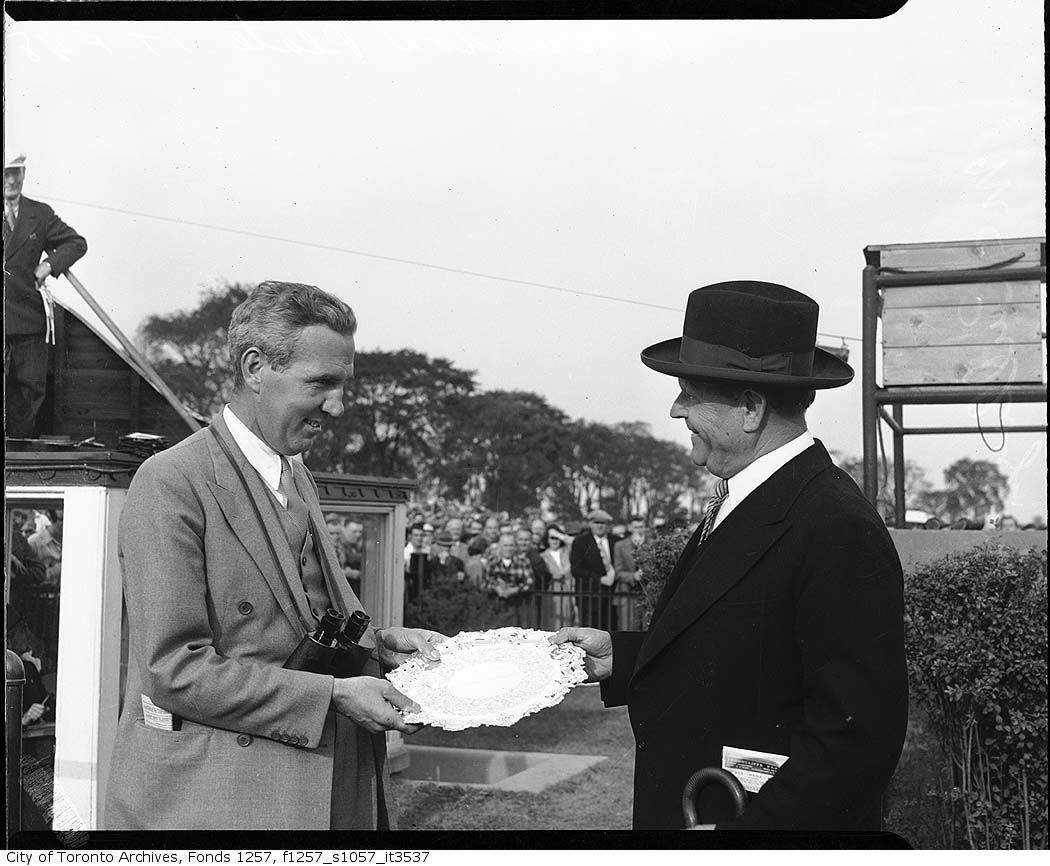
- C. George McCullagh (left) receives the 1940 Clarendon Plate, at Thorncliffe Park race track
- Class: Restricted Stakes
- Location: Woodbine Racetrack; Toronto, Ontario, Canada
- Inaugurated: 1926
- Race type: Thoroughbred - Flat racing
- Website: web.archive.org/web/20100316214346/http://www.woodbineentertainment.com:80/qct/default.asp

Race information
- Distance: 5.5 furlongs
- Surface: Polytrack
- Track: left-handed
- Qualification: Two-Year-Olds, foaled in Ontario
- Weight: Allowances
- Purse: $150,000

The Clarendon Stakes is a Thoroughbred horse race currently run annually at Woodbine Racetrack in Toronto, Ontario, Canada. Held in early July, the sprint race is open to two-year-old horses foaled in the province of Ontario and is contested over a distance of 5 1/2 furlongs on Polytrack synthetic dirt. It currently offers a purse of $150,000.

Inaugurated in 1926 at Toronto's now defunct Thorncliffe Park Raceway, it was known as the Clarendon Plate. In 1953 the race was moved to the Old Woodbine Racetrack then in 1956 to its present home at the new Woodbine Racetrack.

In 1967 Dancer's Image won this race and went on to win the following year's Kentucky Derby.
