= Seagram Stables =

Coordinates: 43.47876°N 80.50816°W

Seagram Stables was a Canadian Thoroughbred horse racing operation founded in 1888 by the wealthy distiller, Joseph E. Seagram. Located in Seagram's hometown of Waterloo, Ontario, the stables and large training facilities were built along Lincoln Road.

Joseph E. Seagram established his breeding operation's bloodlines by importing mares in foal from English sires. Between 1891 and 1898 his stables won eight consecutive Queen's Plates, Canada's most prestigious horse racing event. In total, during his lifetime Joseph Seagram won the race fifteen times and horses from his stables won every major race in Canada as well as races in the United States. As part of a program honoring important horse racing tracks and racing stables, the Pennsylvania Railroad named its baggage car #5860 the "Seagram Stable".

Following the death of Joseph E. Seagram in 1919, his sons took over the operation and would win the Plate four more times before dismantling their racing stables in 1933. Edward F. Seagram arranged to buy out brothers Norman and Thomas and he would go on to win the family's twentieth Plate in 1935 with the filly, Sally Fuller. Edward F. Seagrams son, J. E. Frowde Seagram, would continue the family tradition and manage a successful racing operation.

Of such prominence, the black and gold colours of the Seagram Stables were adopted by the City of Waterloo.

Eventually, the stables were torn down and the property was sold for real estate development.
