= Joseph E. Seagram =

Canadian politician, businessman and philanthropist

- Born: Joseph Emm Seagram; April 15, 1841; Fisher's Mills, Canada West
- Died: August 18, 1919 (aged 78); Waterloo, Ontario, Canada
- Resting place: Mount Hope Cemetery, Waterloo
- Occupations: Businessman: Distiller, Politician, Racehorse owner/breeder
- Known for: Seagram Distilleries
- Political party: Conservative
- Spouse: Stephanie Urbs
- Children: 1) Blanche Alexandrine Seagram Bowlby (1871–1919); 2) Edward Frowde (1873–1937); 3) Joseph Hamilton (1875–1956); 4) Norman (1879–1963); 5) Thomas William (1887–1965)
- Parent(s): Octavius Augustus Seagram and Amelia Stiles
- Honors: Canadian Horse Racing Hall of Fame (1976)

Joseph Emm Seagram (April 15, 1841 – August 18, 1919) was a Canadian distillery founder, politician, philanthropist, and major owner of thoroughbred racehorses.

== Early life ==
Joseph Seagram was born April 15, 1841, at Fisher's Mills, near Hespeler, now part of Cambridge, Ontario. He was the son of Octavius Augustus Seagram and Amelia Stiles, who emigrated to Canada from Wiltshire, England in 1837. His parents died when he was a child, leaving him and his brother, Edward Frowde, to be raised by clergy. For several years, Joseph lived at William Tassie's boarding school (now Galt Collegiate Institute and Vocational School) in the city of Galt (now also a part of Cambridge). He went on to study for a year at Bryant & Stratton College in Buffalo, New York.

== Career ==
After returning from school in Buffalo, Seagram worked for a time as a bookkeeper at an axe-handle factory in Galt, Ontario. He left the position after getting into a fistfight with a senior bookkeeper, going on to work as a bookkeeper at a mill in Galt and managing a mill in Stratford.

Later, offered the opportunity to manage a flour mill (Granite Mills) in Waterloo, Ontario, he learned about the distilling process at Waterloo Distillery, a small aside to the George Randall Company's flour business, using extra grain stocks to make alcoholic beverages. In 1869, five years after joining the company, Joseph Seagram bought out one of the firm's three partners (George Randall) to become Seagram and Roos, then in 1883, became the one hundred percent owner (buying out William Hespeler and William Roos) and renamed it Seagram. Making whisky became the most important part of the business, Seagram built it into one of the country's most successful of its kind. His 1907 creation, Seagram's VO whisky, became the best selling Canadian whisky in the world. The VO blend, which stood for "very own," was created to celebrate the marriage of Seagram's son Thomas.

Seagram was a benefactor to the city of Waterloo. Among his donations to the community was a 13-acre (53,000 m^{2}) parcel of land occupied today by the Grand River Hospital. Formally known as the Greenbush, the plot was bordered by Green Street, Park Street, Mount Hope Street and King Street in what was then Berlin. The gift specified that the property was to be used solely for hospital services and open to everyone regardless of race, colour or creed.

Seagram was the director of the Economical Mutual Insurance Company for several years. He was also known for his philanthropic activities including the donation of 13 acres of land for the construction of the Kitchener-Waterloo Hospital, a gift that was dependent on the facility being "open to everyone regardless of race, color, or creed." In 1957, the Seagram distillery donated $250,000 to construct Seagram Stadium at the University of Waterloo.

=== Political life ===
He served as a Waterloo town councilor from 1879 to 1886. In the 1896 Canadian federal election, he was elected to the House of Commons of Canada as the Conservative Party member for Waterloo North. In the 1900 election he was acclaimed and was reelected in 1904, serving until September 1908 when he chose not to seek another term.

=== Thoroughbred racing ===
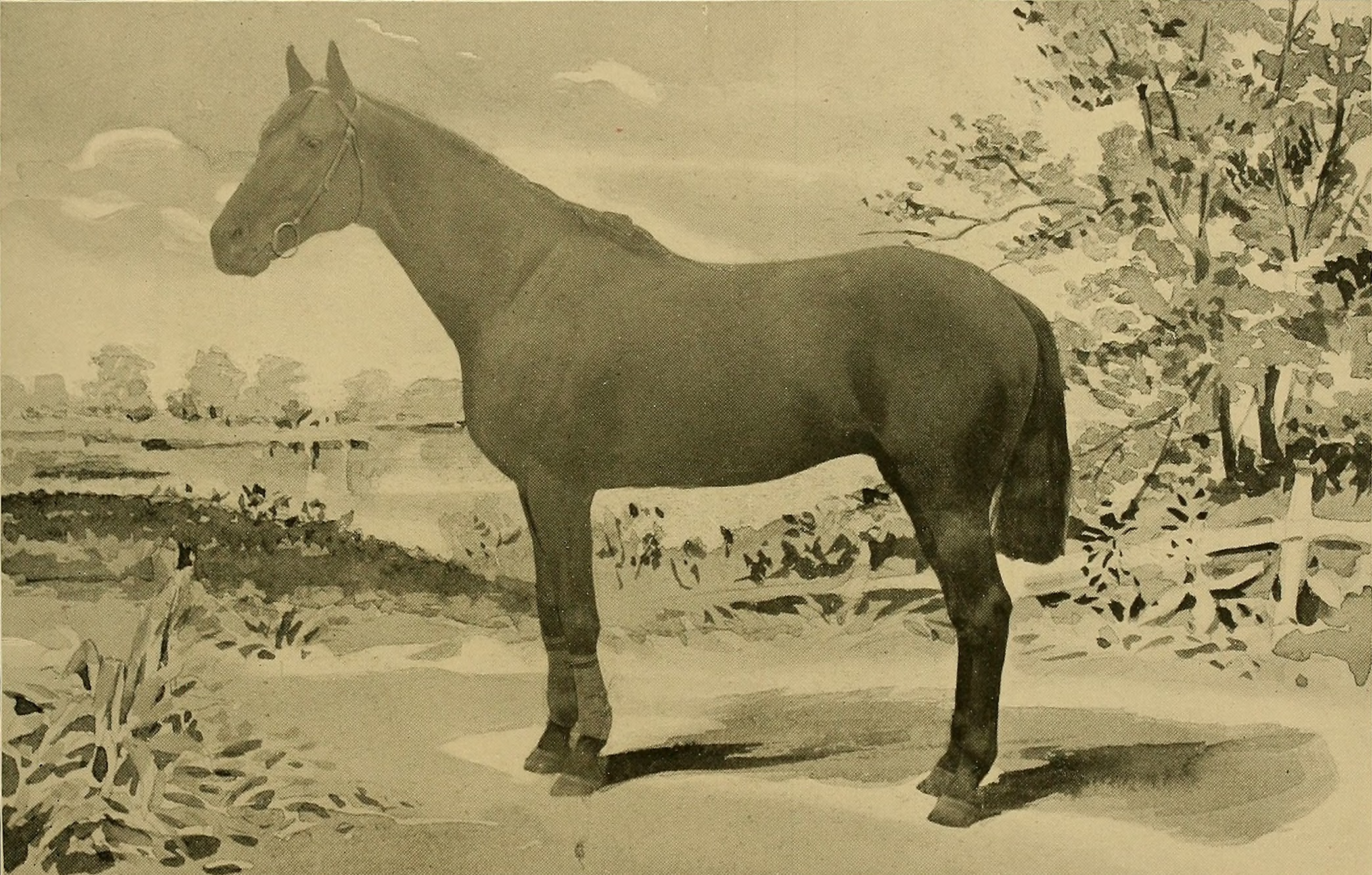
Saragossa, 1894 & 1895 Toronto Cup Handicap winner.

Seagram bought his first racehorse at the age of 16 and arranged to have it compete in races in Galt. He founded Seagram Stables in 1888, building its bloodlines by importing mares in foal from English sires. Between 1891 and 1898, his stables won eight consecutive Queen's Plates, Canada's most prestigious horse racing event. During his lifetime, Joseph Seagram won the race a total of fifteen times, with his heirs who took over the stable winning it another five times.

Seagram played a role in the creation of the Ontario Jockey Club in 1881. He was elected to the club's board in 1898 and served as president from 1906 until his death. In 1908 helped found the Canadian Racing Association.

On its formation in 1976, the Canadian Horse Racing Hall of Fame inducted Joseph E. Seagram as part of its inaugural class in the builder's category.

== Personal life ==
Seagram married Stephanie Urbs, the niece of Jacob Hespeler, and together they had six children: Edward F., Thomas W., Joseph H., Norman, Alice and Marie, who died as an infant. The family built and lived in a 65-room home located in Waterloo. Built in 1886 and known as Bratton House, the building stayed in the family until the late 1930s, following the death of Edward in 1937. After sitting vacant for several years it was purchased by the board of Kitchener-Waterloo Orphanage in 1939, operating as the Willow Hall orphanage until its closure in 1960. The land was sold to St. John's Lutheran Church and the building was razed to build a church that continues to operate on the site.

== Death ==
Seagram died in Waterloo in 1919. He was buried in Mount Hope Cemetery. His heirs sold the company to Samuel Bronfman in 1928.

Parliament of Canada
Preceded by Isaac Erb Bowman	Member of Parliament for Waterloo North; 1896–1908	Succeeded by William Lyon Mackenzie King
