= Breeders' Stakes =

Canadian Thoroughbred horse race

- Third leg in the Canadian Triple Crown
- Class: Restricted
- Location: Woodbine Racetrack; Toronto, Ontario, Canada
- Inaugurated: 1889 (137 years ago)
- Race type: Flat / Thoroughbred
- Website: woodbine.com/breeders-stakes

Race information
- Distance: 1 1/2 miles (12 furlongs)
- Surface: Turf
- Track: Left-handed
- Qualification: Three-year-olds (foaled in Canada)
- Weight: Colt/Gelding: 126 lbs (57.2 kg); Filly: 121 lb (55 kg)
- Purse: CDN$500,000

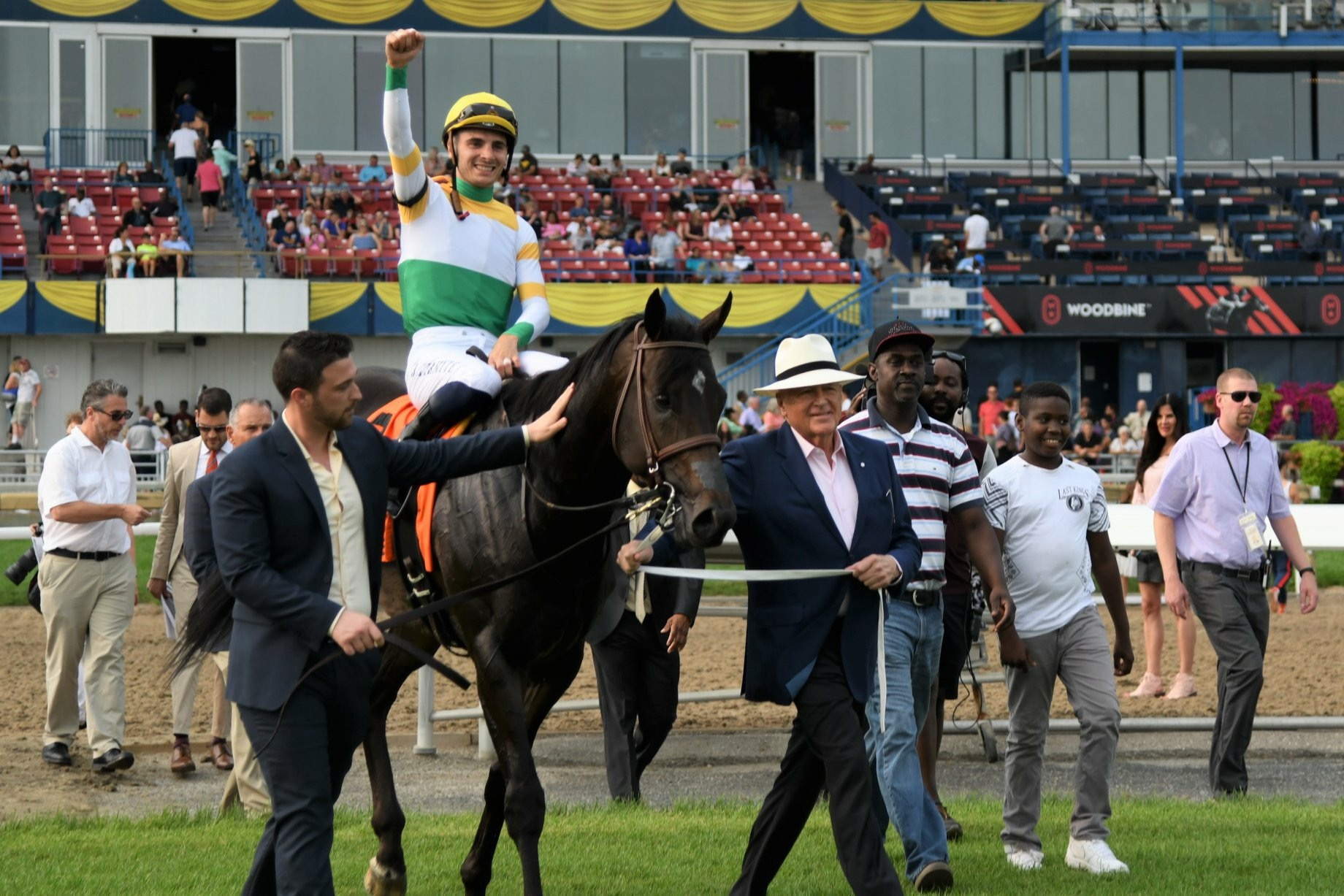
2018 Breeders' Stakes winner

The Breeders' Stakes is a stakes race for Thoroughbred race horses foaled in Canada, first run in 1889. Since 1959, it has been the third race in the Canadian Triple Crown for three-year-olds. Held annually in October at Woodbine Racetrack in Toronto, Ontario, the Breeders' Stakes follows the August running of the King's Plate and the September running of the Prince of Wales Stakes. At a distance of one-and-a-half miles, the Breeders' Stakes is the longest of the three Triple Crown races and is the only jewel raced on turf (the King's Plate is raced on Tapeta synthetic dirt and the Prince of Wales on a traditional dirt track).

== History ==
In 1959, the Canadian Triple Crown was created and then won by New Providence. Six more three-year-olds, including the filly Dance Smartly, have since equalled the feat, with four of them doing so in a five-year period from 1989 to 1993.

Six horses have won the first two legs of the Triple Crown but lost on the grass in the Breeders' Stakes. They are:

- 1970: Almoner finished second to Mary of Scotland (1970)
- 1975: L'Enjoleur finished third to Momigi (1975)
- 1976: Norcliffe finished fifth to Tiny Tinker (1976)
- 1986: Golden Choice finished third to Carotene (1986)
- 2000: Scatter The Gold finished third to Lodge Hill (2000)
- 2020: Mighty Heart finished seventh to Belichick (2020)

In 1973 Saskatoon native, Joan Phipps made history aboard Singing Spirit. Though she finished 11th, she became the first female jockey to compete in one of the Canadian Triple Crown races. In 1999, 26 years after Phipps landmark race, Laurie Gulas rode Free Vacation to victory in the Breeders' Stakes, becoming the first female jockey to win a Canadian Triple Crown race.

In 2004, Catherine Day Phillips became the first woman trainer to win the Breeders' Stakes.

The 1994 renewal was held at Fort Erie Race Track while the Woodbine turf course was undergoing renovations.

Since 1957, the race has been run at 1 1/2 miles. Earlier renewals were held at:

- 9 furlongs — 1889–1924, 1952–1956
- 8.5 furlongs — 1925–1951

The greatest longshot to win the race was Miami Deco in 2010, who paid $132.10 for a $2 win bet. The slowest time ever recorded was 2:50 by Crowning Honors in 1985 when the rain turned the course into a "swamp".

== Records ==
Speed record: (Through 1998, Woodbine times were recorded in fifths of a second. Since 1999 they are in hundredths of a second)

- 2:26 2/5 – Charlie's Dewan (1995)

Most wins by a jockey:

- 5 – Patrick Husbands (2003, 2006, 2007, 2015, 2021)

Most wins by a trainer:

- 9 – Roger Attfield (2015, 2009, 2001, 1999, 1998, 1993, 1990, 1989, 1986)

Most wins by an owner:

- 9 - Joseph E. Seagram (1889, 1891, 1895, 1901, 1905, 1906, 1907, 1908, 1909, 1916)

== Winners ==
| Year | Winner | Jockey | Trainer | Owner | Dist. (Miles) | Time | Win$ |
|---|---|---|---|---|---|---|---|
| 2026 | Fire and Wine | Jalon L. Samuel | Zeljko Krcmar | Paul Ryder | 1-1/2m | 2:30.57 | $400,000 |
| 2025 | Tom's Magic | Rafael Hernandez | Michael Stidham | CJ Thoroughbreds & Mo Speed Racing | 1-1/2m | 2:31.80 | $400,000 |
| 2024 | Roscar | Justin Stein | Rachel Halden | Chiefswood Stables | 1-1/2m | 2:34.72 | $400,000 |
| 2023 | Touch 'n Ride | Kazushi Kimura | Layne S. Giliforte | Chiefswood Stables Limited | 1-1/2m | 2:27.56 | $400,000 |
| 2022 | Sir for Sure | Declan Carroll | Mark E. Casse | Heste Sport Inc. | 1-1/2m | 2:28.88 | $400,000 |
| 2021 | British Royalty | Patrick Husbands | Barbara J. Minshall | Bruce Lunsford | 1-1/2 m | 2:34.00 | $400,000 |
| 2020 | Belichick | Luis Contreras | Josie Carroll | NK Racing & LNJ Foxwoods | 1-1/2 m | 2:32.51 | $240,000 |
| 2019 | Tone Broke | Rafael Hernandez | Steven M. Asmussen | L and N Racing LLC (Lee, Michael & Andrew Levinson & Don Nelson) | 1-1/2 m | 2:30.43 | $240,000 |
| 2018 | Neepawa | Jerome Lermyte | Mark E. Casse | Chiefswood Stable | 1-1/2 m | 2:31.18 | $240,000 |
| 2017 | Channel Maker | Rafael Hernandez | William I. Mott | Joey Gee Thoroughbreds, etc. | 1-1/2 m | 2:29.70 | $240,000 |
| 2016 | Camp Creek | Rafael Hernandez | Rachel Halden | Hillsbrook Farms | 1-1/2 m | 2:29.45 | $300,000 |
| 2015 | Danish Dynaformer | Patrick Husbands | Roger Attfield | Charles E. Fipke | 1-1/2 m | 2:29.28 | $300,000 |
| 2014 | Ami's Holiday | Luis Contreras | Josie Carroll | Ivan Dalos | 1-1/2 m | 2:30.12 | $300,000 |
| 2013 | Up With the Birds | Eurico Rosa da Silva | Malcolm Pierce | Sam-Son Farm | 1-1/2 m | 2:28.69 | $300,000 |
| 2012 | Irish Mission | Alex Solis | Mark Frostad | Robert S. Evans | 1-1/2 m | 2:30.90 | $300,000 |
| 2011 | Pender Harbour | Luis Contreras | Michael P. DePaulo | Dennis Andrews, Sandra Lazaruk, Robert & Roberta Giffin | 1-1/2 m | 2:36.31 | $300,000 |
| 2010 | Miami Deco | Richard Dos Ramos | Brian A. Lynch | Jim & Susan Hill | 1-1/2 m | 2:34.24 | $300,000 |
| 2009 | Perfect Shower | Jono Jones | Roger Attfield | Charles E. Fipke | 1-1/2 m | 2:29.39 | $300,000 |
| 2008 | Marlang | Richard Dos Ramos | Debbie England | Gus Schickedanz | 1-1/2 m | 2:28.58 | $300,000 |
| 2007 | Marchfield | Patrick Husbands | Mark E. Casse | Melnyk Racing Stables | 1-1/2 m | 2:29.50 | $300,000 |
| 2006 | Royal Challenger | Patrick Husbands | Brian A. Lynch | Stronach Stables | 1-1/2 m | 2:28.66 | $300,000 |
| 2005 | Jambalaya | Jono Jones | Catherine Day Phillips | Catherine Day Phillips | 1-1/2 m | 2:27.86 | $300,000 |
| 2004 | A Bit O'Gold | Jono Jones | Catherine Day Phillips | Kingfield Racing Stables | 1-1/2 m | 2:27.15 | $300,000 |
| 2003 | Wando † | Patrick Husbands | Mike Keogh | Gus Schickedanz | 1-1/2 m | 2:28.03 | $300,000 |
| 2002 | Portcullis | Slade Callaghan | Mark Frostad | Sam-Son Farm | 1-1/2 m | 2:29.80 | $300,000 |
| 2001 | Sweetest Thing | Jim McAleney | Roger Attfield | M. & P. Canino, W. Werner, R. Attfield | 1-1/2 m | 2:29.90 | $300,000 |
| 2000 | Lodge Hill | Mike E. Smith | Todd Pletcher | Eugene Melnyk & R. Bristow Farm | 1-1/2 m | 2:28.97 | $300,000 |
| 1999 | Free Vacation | Laurie Gulas | Roger Attfield | M. & P. Canino, W. Werner, R. Attfield | 1-1/2 m | 2:28.45 | $195,000 |
| 1998 | Pinafore Park | Robert Landry | Roger Attfield | Anderson & Ferguson | 1-1/2 m | 2:30.20 | $180,000 |
| 1997 | John The Magician | Steven Bahen | John A. Ross | R. M. C. Stable | 1-1/2 m | 2:35.60 | $175,860 |
| 1996 | Chief Bearhart | Mickey Walls | Mark Frostad | Sam-Son Farm | 1-1/2 m | 2:28.60 | $171,120 |
| 1995 | Charlie's Dewan | Craig Perret | Mark Frostad | Kinghaven Farms et al. | 1-1/2 m | 2:26.40 | $182,700 |
| 1994 | Basqueian | Jack Lauzon | Daniel J. Vella | Frank Stronach | 1-1/2 m | 2:47.80 | $149,739 |
| 1993 | Peteski † | Craig Perret | Roger Attfield | Earle I. Mack | 1-1/2 m | 2:30.40 | $137,549 |
| 1992 | Blitzer | Don Seymour | Daniel J. Vella | Frank Stronach | 1-1/2 m | 2:35.60 | $180,000 |
| 1991 | Dance Smartly † | Pat Day | Jim Day | Sam-Son Farm | 1-1/2 m | 2:31.40 | $182,140 |
| 1990 | Izvestia † | Don Seymour | Roger Attfield | Kinghaven Farms | 1-1/2 m | 2:33.40 | $183,600 |
| 1989 | With Approval † | Don Seymour | Roger Attfield | Kinghaven Farms | 1-1/2 m | 2:29.00 | $199,159 |
| 1988 | King's Deputy | Sandy Hawley | Jim Day | Sam-Son Farm | 1-1/2 m | 2:30.60 | $103,500 |
| 1987 | Hangin On a Star | Dave Penna | Jim Day | Sam-Son Farm | 1-1/2 m | 2:30.00 | $105,480 |
| 1986 | Carotene | Richard Dos Ramos | Roger Attfield | Kinghaven Farms | 1-1/2 m | 2:32.60 | $67,140 |
| 1985 | Crowning Honors | Brian Swatuk | Arthur H. Warner | Victura Farm | 1-1/2 m | 2:50.00 | $65,280 |
| 1984 | Bounding Away | David Clark | Macdonald Benson | Windfields Farm | 1-1/2 m | 2:32.60 | $65,940 |
| 1983 | Kingsbridge | Robin Platts | John J. Tammaro Jr. | Kinghaven Farms | 1-1/2 m | 2:32.40 | $66,480 |
| 1982 | Runaway Groom | Robin Platts | John DiMario | Albert J. Coppola | 1-1/2 m | 2:32.20 | $49,725 |
| 1981 | Social Wizard | George HoSang | Donald H. Campbell | D. Mann | 1-1/2 m | 2:48.80 | $40,464 |
| 1980 | Ben Fab | Gary Stahlbaum | Jacques Dumas | Fernand Audet & René & Pierre Benoit | 1-1/2 m | 2:31.60 | $33,360 |
| 1979 | Bridle Path | Sandy Hawley | Macdonald Benson | Windfields Farm | 1-1/2 m | 2:29.60 | $30,400 |
| 1978 | Overskate | Robin Platts | Gil Rowntree | Stafford Farm | 1-1/2 m | 2:29.40 | $32,000 |
| 1977 | Dance in Time | Gary Stahlbaum | Frank H. Merrill | Viscount Hardinge | 1-1/2 m | 3:01.60 | $32,650 |
| 1976 | Tiny Tinker | Sandy Hawley | George Nemett | Warren Beasley | 1-1/2 m | 2:31.20 | $32,500 |
| 1975 | Momigi | Gary Melanson | John Morahan | Koichiro Hayata | 1-1/2 m | 2:38.20 | $32,000 |
| 1974 | Haymaker's Jig | Robin Platts | Lou Cavalaris Jr. | Gardiner Farm | 1-1/2 m | 2:30.80 | $32,250 |
| 1973 | Come In Dad | Wayne Green | Conrad Cohen | Harvey Tenenbaum | 1-1/2 m | 2:33.60 | $27,910 |
| 1972 | Nice Dancer | Sandy Hawley | Jerry Lavigne | Tom Morton & Harlequin | 1-1/2 m | 2:35.80 | $24,960 |
| 1971 | Belle Geste | Noel Turcotte | Carl F. Chapman | Beatrice Latimer | 1-1/2 m | 2:28.00 | $26,230 |
| 1970 | Mary of Scotland | Richard Grubb | Lou Cavalaris Jr. | Gardiner Farm | 1-1/2 m | 2:38.40 | $26,420 |
| 1969 | Grey Whiz | John LeBlanc | Joseph "Yonnie" Starr | Harry W. Hatch | 1-1/2 m | 2:29.00 | $23,980 |
| 1968 | No Parando | John LeBlanc | Joseph "Yonnie" Starr | Frank H. Sherman | 1-1/2 m | 2:30.00 | $19,120 |
| 1967 | Pine Point | Avelino Gomez | Jerry C. Meyer | Willow Downs Farm (Saul Wagman) | 1-1/2 m | 2:32.20 | $18,940 |
| 1966 | Titled Hero | Avelino Gomez | Patrick MacMurchy | Peter K. Marshall | 1-1/2 m | 2:31.40 | $16,500 |
| 1965 | Good Old Mort | Paul Kallai | Jerry C. Meyer | Dane Hill Acres | 1-1/2 m | 2:43.00 | $15,650 |
| 1964 | Arctic Hills | Dick Armstrong | W. Moorhead | Edith Ferguson Cardy | 1-1/2 m | 2:33.60 | $17,350 |
| 1963 | Canebora † | Manuel Ycaza | Gordon J. McCann | Windfields Farm | 1-1/2 m | 2:32.20 | $16,450 |
| 1962 | Crafty Lace | Ron Turcotte | J. D. Mooney | Jeremy M. Jacobs | 1-1/2 m | 2:52.00 | $18,150 |
| 1961 | Song of Even | Jim Fitzsimmons | Gordon J. McCann | Windfields Farm | 1-1/2 m | 2:31.60 | $17,550 |
| 1960 | Hidden Treasure | Alfonso Coy | Robert S. Bateman | William R. Beasley | 1-1/2 m | 2:34.40 | $16,150 |
| 1959 | New Providence † | Avelino Gomez | Gordon J. McCann | Windfields Farm | 1-1/2 m | 2:39.80 | $8,370 |
| 1958 | Dr. Em Jay | Hugo Dittfach | Arthur H. Warner | Lanson Farm | 1 1/4 m | 2:03.60 | $6,350 |
| 1957 | The Schreiber | C. O'Brien | E. Hall | Miss C. B. Armstrong | 1 1/4 m | 2:04.00 | $7,450 |
| 1956 | Canadian Champ | Eugene Rodriguez | John Passero | William R. Beasley | 1-1/8 m | 1:52.00 | $8,000 |
| 1955 | Ace Marine | George Walker | Joseph "Yonnie" Starr | Larkin Maloney | 1-1/8 m | 1:51.40 | $3,830 |
| 1954 | Queen's Own | Ted Johnson | Gordon J. McCann | E. P. Taylor | 1-1/8 m | 1:56.40 | $3,700 |
| 1953 | Chain Reaction | Bud Giacomelli | Richard Townrow | Elodie S. Tomlinson | 1-1/8 m | 1:51.60 | $3,970 |
| 1952 | Genthorn | Anthony Licata | Willie Russell | Four L's Stable | 1-1/8 m | 1:53.60 | $4,050 |
| 1951 | Libertine | Alf Bavington | Red Barnard | Medway Stable (Jack Smallman) | 1-1/16 m | 1:45.60 | $4,320 |
| 1950 | Nephisto | Pat Remillard | Arthur Brent | Parkwood Stable | 1-1/16 m | 1:43.60 | $4,100 |
| 1949 | Grilled | Robert Keane | Johnny Thorpe | J. E. Frowde Seagram | 1-1/16 m | 1:46.00 | $3,485 |
| 1948 | Last Mark | Frankie Dougherty | James G. Fair | James G. Fair | 1-1/16 m | 1:50.20 | $3,540 |
| 1947 | Canada's Teddy | Robert B. Watson | Morris Fishman | Molly Fishman | 1-1/16 m | 1:44.60 | $3,435 |
| 1946 | Windfields | Herb Lindberg | Bert Alexandra | E. P. Taylor | 1-1/16 m | 1:45.40 | $3,240 |
| 1945 | Uttermost | Robert B. Watson | Cecil Howard | Harry C. Hatch | 1-1/16 m | 1:46.60 | $3,500 |
| 1944 | Broom Time | Joe Cowley | T. Frost | J. E. Frost | 1-1/16 m | 1:46.20 | $3,350 |
| 1943 | Tulachmore | Robert B. Watson | William E. MacDonald | MacDonald Stable | 1-1/16 m | 1:47.60 | $3,685 |
| 1942 | Shepperton | Robert B. Watson | Fred H. Schelke | Fred H. Schelke | 1-1/16 m | 1:46.80 | $,320 |
| 1941 | Attrisius | Henry Palaez | J. Smith | Riverdale Stable | 1-1/16 m | 1:49.80 | $3,365 |
| 1940 | Hood | Pat Remillard | C. Mitchell | J. R. McIntyre | 1-1/16 m | 1:47.20 | $3,460 |
| 1939 | Archworth | Sterling Young | Mark R. Cowell | C. George McCullagh | 1-1/16 m | 1:48.40 | $2,430 |
| 1938 | Mona Bell | Sterling Young | Bert Alexandra | Cosgrave Stable | 1-1/16 m | 1:46.40 | $2,435 |
| 1937 | Fore Isus | Pat Remillard | Arthur Brent | Erindale Stable | 1-1/16 m | 1:48.80 | $2,030 |
| 1936 | Samoan | Charlie McTague | Johnny Thorpe | Edward Frowde Seagram | 1-1/16 m | 1:46.80 | $2,220 |
| 1935 | Gay Sympathy | Herb Lindberg | Johnny Thorpe | Edward Frowde Seagram | 1-1/16 m | 1:49.00 | $2,630 |
| 1934 | Horometer | Frankie Mann | Harry Giddings Jr. | Samuel McLaughlin | 1-1/16 m | 1:47.80 | $2,585 |
| 1933 | Khaki John | John Mattioli | Fred H. Schelke | Thorncliffe Stable | 1-1/16 m | 1:51.60 | $2,675 |
| 1932 | Queensway | Frankie Mann | Harry Giddings Jr. | Robert W. R. Cowie | 1-1/16 m | 1:48.20 | $2,410 |
| 1931 | Froth Blower | Frankie Mann | Harry Giddings Jr. | Robert W. R. Cowie | 1-1/16 m | 1:47.80 | $3.390 |
| 1930 | Whale Oil | Henry Little | Fred H. Schelke | Thorncliffe Stable | 1-1/16 m | 1:49.60 | $3,420 |
| 1929 | Circulet | John Maiben | William H. Bringloe | Seagram Stables | 1-1/16 m | 1:49.60 | $3,420 |
| 1928 | Young Kitty | Lester Pichon | William H. Bringloe | Seagram Stables | 1-1/16 m | 1:49.20 | $3,365 |
| 1927 | Mr. Gaiety | K. Moore | Fred Fox | Josephine Glassco | 1-1/16 m | 1:51.40 | $3,505 |
| 1926 | Tattling | Pete Walls | H. Guy Bedwell | J. K. L. Ross | 1-1/16 m | 1:48.80 | $3,585 |
| 1925 | Jean Crest | T. Wilson | J. W. Barbour | J. P. White | 1-1/16 m | 1:48.80 | $3,460 |
| 1924 | Vrana | Pete Walls | H. Guy Bedwell | J. K. L. Ross | 1-1/8 m | 1:56.60 | $2,745 |
| 1923 | Trail Blazer | E. Smallwood | Fred H. Schelke | Thorncliffe Stable | 1-1/8 m | 1:58.00 | $2,490 |
| 1922 | Paddle | A. Gantner | George Walker | Brookdale Stable | 1-1/8 m | 1:56.60 | $2,375 |
| 1921 | Herendesy | A. Richcreek | George Walker | Brookdale Stable | 1-1/8 m | 1:56.00 | $1,535 |
| 1920 | St. Paul | Roxy Romanelli | Harry Giddings Jr. | Harry Giddings Sr. | 1-1/8 m | 1:56.00 | $1,620 |
| 1918 | 1919 | Race not held | | | | | |
| 1917 | Tarahera | Lee Mink | George Walker | Brookdale Stable | 1-1/8 m | 2:00.00 | $1,800 |
| 1916 | Mandarin | Arthur Pickens | Barry Littlefield | Joseph E. Seagram | 1-1/8 m | 1:58.20 | $1,660 |
| 1915 | Fair Montague | Ted Rice | John Nixon | Charles Millar | 1-1/8 m | 1:56.00 | $1,790 |
| 1914 | Beehive | C. Peak | Harry Giddings Jr. | Harry Giddings Sr. | 1-1/8 m | 1:56.60 | $1,770 |
| 1913 | Hearts of Oak | J. Wilson | Harry Giddings Jr. | Harry Giddings Sr. | 1-1/8 m | 1:56.40 | $1,420 |
| 1912 | Amberite | Guy Burns | S. Mumford | C. A. Crew | 1-1/8 m | 2:04.00 | $930 |
| 1911 | St. Bass | Eddie Dugan | Harry Giddings Jr. | Harry Giddings Sr. | 1-1/8 m | 1:56.60 | $835 |
| 1910 | Parmer | J. Wilson | John Nixon | Valley Farm Stable | 1-1/8 m | 1:59.60 | $805 |
| 1909 | Courtier | P. Goldstein | Barry Littlefield | Joseph E. Seagram | 1-1/8 m | 1:58.20 | $880 |
| 1908 | Seismic | Carroll H. Shilling | Barry Littlefield | Joseph E. Seagram | 1-1/8 m | 1:58.40 | $860 |
| 1907 | Sea Wall | R. McDaniel | Barry Littlefield | Joseph E. Seagram | 1-1/8 m | 1:56.40 | $905 |
| 1906 | Slaughter | John K. Truebel | Barry Littlefield | Joseph E. Seagram | 1-1/8 m | 1:56.40 | $830 |
| 1905 | Will King | E. Walsh | Nathaniel Dyment | Nathaniel Dyment | 1-1/8 m | 2:00.50 | $860 |
| 1904 | War Whoop | Roxy Romanelli | John Nixon | Kirkfield Stable | 1-1/8 m | 2:01.50 | $920 |
| 1903 | Ayrshire Lad | Mr. Munro | Ed Whyte | William Hendrie | 1-1/8 m | 2:02.00 | $890 |
| 1902 | Lyddite | T. Walker | Ed Whyte | William Hendrie | 1-1/8 m | 2:00.50 | $710 |
| 1901 | John Ruskin | Harry Vititoe | Harry Blair | Joseph E. Seagram | 1-1/8 m | 2:04.20 | $620 |
| 1900 | The Provost | Mr. Ballard | Ed Whyte | William Hendrie | 1-1/8 m | 2:03.50 | $570 |
| 1899 | Butter Scotch | Mr. Mason | Ed Whyte | William Hendrie | 1-1/8 m | 2:03.00 | $470 |
| 1898 | Wenlock | E. James | John Dyment | Nathaniel Dyment | 1-1/8 m | 2:04.00 | $460 |
| 1897 | Wicker | Mr. Songer | C. Leighton | Miss E. Jones | 1-1/8 m | 2:02.20 | $430 |
| 1896 | Melcha | G. Flint | Ed Whyte | William Hendrie | 1-1/8 m | 2:05.50 | $510 |
| 1895 | Bonniefield | A. Booker | John R. Walker | Joseph E. Seagram | 1-1/8 m | 2:09.75 | 460 |
| 1894 | Nancy Lee | G. Flint | B. Alcock | William Hendrie | 1-1/8 m | 2:09.20 | $490 |
| 1893 | Bonnie Dundee | Mr. Shauer | B. Alcock | William Hendrie | 1-1/8 m | 2:09.50 | $480 |
| 1892 | Jardine | F. Regan | Daniel Curtin | T. H. Hodgens | 1-1/8 m | 2:14.20 | $410 |
| 1891 | Victorious | M. Gorman | John R. Walker | Joseph E. Seagram | 1-1/8 m | 2:01.50 | $370 |
| 1890 | Periwinkle | Mr. Snyder | Charles Phair | Charles Phair | 1-1/8 m | n/a | $365 |
| 1889 | Helen Leigh | Mr. Bowman | John R. Walker | Joseph E. Seagram | 1-1/8 m | 2:04.50 | $325 |

† designates a Triple Crown winner.
