= Eddie Dugan =

American jockey

- Eddie Dugan, 1909

Personal information
- Born: c. 1892 California, United States
- Died: 1933
- Occupation: Jockey

Horse racing career
- Sport: Horse racing
- Career wins: not found

Major racing wins
- Adirondack Stakes (1907, 1915); Annual Champion Stakes (1907); Atlantic Stakes (1907); Brighton Cup (1907); Dolphin Stakes (1907); Great Eastern Handicap (1907); Great Filly Stakes (1907); Manhattan Handicap (1907); Neptune Stakes (1907); Ocean Handicap (1907, 1909); Pansy Stakes (1907); Remsen Handicap (1907); Russet Stakes (1907); Sacramento Handicap (1907); Sapphire Stakes (1907, 1908, 1909); Suburban Handicap (1909); White Plains Handicap (1907); Belles Stakes (1908); Brooklyn Derby (1908, 1909); Burns Handicap (1908, 1909); First Special Stakes (1908, 1909); Flight Stakes (1908); Gazelle Stakes (1908); Ladies Handicap (1908); Lawrence Realization Stakes (1908); Mermaid Stakes (1908); Occidental Handicap (1908, 1909); Paumonok Handicap (1908); Brooklyn Handicap (1909, 1910); Champlain Handicap (1909); Dash Stakes (1909); Double Event Stakes (part 2) (1909); Great American Stakes (1909, 1910); Jerome Handicap (1909); Mount Vernon Handicap (1909); Saranac Handicap (1909); Spring Stakes (1909); Broadway Stakes (1910); Daisy Stakes (1910); Hudson Stakes (1910); Laureate Stakes (1910); Tremont Stakes (1910); Dominion Handicap (1911); Hamilton Derby (1911) American Classic Race wins: Preakness Stakes (1908, 1911); Belmont Stakes (1909) Canadian Classic Race wins: King's Plate (1911); Breeders' Stakes (1911)

Racing awards
- United States Champion Jockey by wins (1909)

Significant horses
- Fair Play, Fitz Herbert, Friar Rock, Joe Madden, King James, Royal Tourist, St. Bass, Watervale

Eddie Dugan (b. c. 1892 in California – d. 1933 in California) was a jockey in Thoroughbred horse racing who won three American Classic Races and two Canadian Classic Races. In addition, Dugan raced and won in the Russian Empire.

== Biography ==
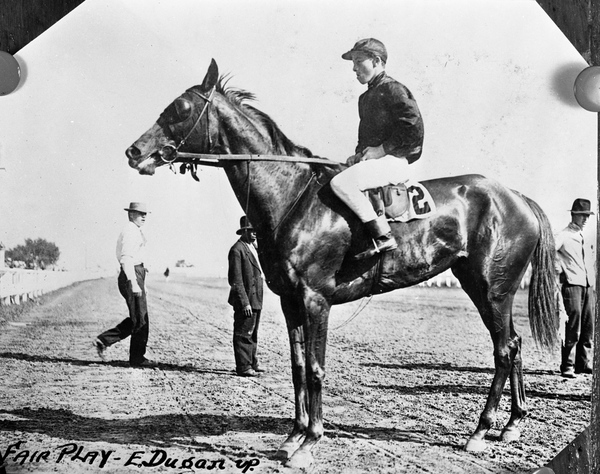
Eddie Dugan on Fair Play at Empire City Racetrack, 1907

In 1907, Eddie Dugan was an apprentice jockey. He rode in Chicago and at racetracks in the Northeastern United States where a New York City newspaper called him "the cleverest apprentice in the east." Dugan's wins that year included the Manhattan Handicap and the first of two Suburban Handicaps. In 1908, a year when the Hart–Agnew Law banned gambling in New York, the number of Thoroughbred races was limited and the industry, without revenue from betting, was on the verge of collapse. Hired by major stable owners Harry Whitney and Richard T. Wilson Jr., Eddie Dugan won the first of his three American Classic Races, riding Royal Tourist to victory in the Preakness Stakes. In the pre U.S. Triple Crown era, Dugan never rode in the Kentucky Derby.

A very aggressive rider, on September 23, 1908 The New York Times reported that two jockeys had been seriously hurt in a race at Gravesend Race Track on Coney Island due to rough riding by Eddie Dugan for which he was fined and suspended. The Times wrote that Dugan's action was so egregious that other riders in the jockeys' room threatened to attack him. Banned from competing, after his suspension expired Eddie Dugan returned to riding in January 1909 at Santa Anita Park in California.

With racing in the United States still limited from the effects of the Hart–Agnew Law that banned betting on horse races, in April 1909 Eddie Dugan went to England to ride for Harry Whitney but was not granted a jockey license after American Jockey Club records showed he had been suspended six times for rough riding Returning to the United States, Dugan had an outstanding year, winning his second Suburban Handicap, plus the Brooklyn, Jerome and Saranac Handicaps. He also won his second American Classic, riding Sam Hildreth's colt, Joe Madden, to an eight-length win in the Belmont Stakes en route to becoming the United States Champion Jockey by wins.

In another very limited year of racing, in 1910 Eddie Dugan's wins included his second Brooklyn Handicap as well as the Tremont Stakes at Gravesend Race Track. On April 14, 1911, at the Jamestown track at Norfolk, Virginia, Dugan was again blamed for another serious racing accident that sent two jockeys to hospital. On May 17, 1911, he won his second Preakness Stakes aboard Watervale, then traveled to Toronto, Canada where three days after his American classic win, he captured the May 20th Canadian Classic, the King's Plate on the colt St. Bass, owned by Harry Giddings and trained by Harry Giddings, Jr. Three days after that, Dugan and St. Bass won a second Canadian Classic, the Breeders' Stakes.

With racing still restricted in the United States and many New York tracks closed, in 1913 and 1914 Eddie Dugan and his brother Willie traveled to Russian Empire where they competed successfully. They were forced to return to the United States in the fall of 1914 when World War I broke out.

His career in decline and battling weight gain, by August 1915 Eddie Dugan was accepting rides on outside mounts and declaring he could make a 109-pound weight. Out of racing for a few years, he attempted a short-lived comeback at Agua Caliente Racetrack in Tijuana, Mexico.
