= Charles Boyle (horse trainer) =

Canadian horse owner and trainer

Personal information
- Born: 1838 Hamilton, Upper Canada
- Died: April 30, 1919 (aged 80–81)
- Resting place: Woodstock Presbyterian Cemetery, Woodstock, Ontario
- Occupation: Trainer / Owner

Horse racing career
- Sport: Horse racing

Major racing wins
- Hudson Stakes (1893); Maple Leaf Stakes (1897); Oriental Handicap (1897); Sheepshead Bay Stakes (1897); Toronto Cup Stakes (1897, 1899); Hamilton Derby (1909) Canadian Classic Race wins: King's Plate/Queen's Plate (1862, 1883, 1897, 1898)

Honours
- Canadian Horse Racing Hall of Fame (2001)

Significant horses
- Bon Ino, Ferdinand, Havoc, Palermo, Roddy Pringle

Charles Boyle (1838–April 30, 1919) was a Canadian Horse Racing Hall of Fame owner and trainer of Thoroughbred racehorses who was a four-time winner of the Queen's Plate, the oldest continuously run race in North America. He was also known for his influence as a breeder, particularly after he imported the stallion Havoc into Canada where he sired four Plate winners. Boyle was inducted into the Canadian Horse Racing Hall of Fame in 2001.

He was the father of trainer David A. Boyle and of the World War I soldier, adventurer and businessman Joseph W. Boyle, known as Klondike Joe Boyle.

In 1871, Boyle and his family have moved to Woodstock, Ontario where he died on April 30, 1919. Charles and wife Martha are buried in the Woodstock Presbyterian Cemetery along with their son Joseph, who died in 1923.Joseph was originally buried in England but his remains were brought back to Woodstock in 1983 to be interred with his parents.
