= King's Plate =

Canadian Thoroughbred horse race

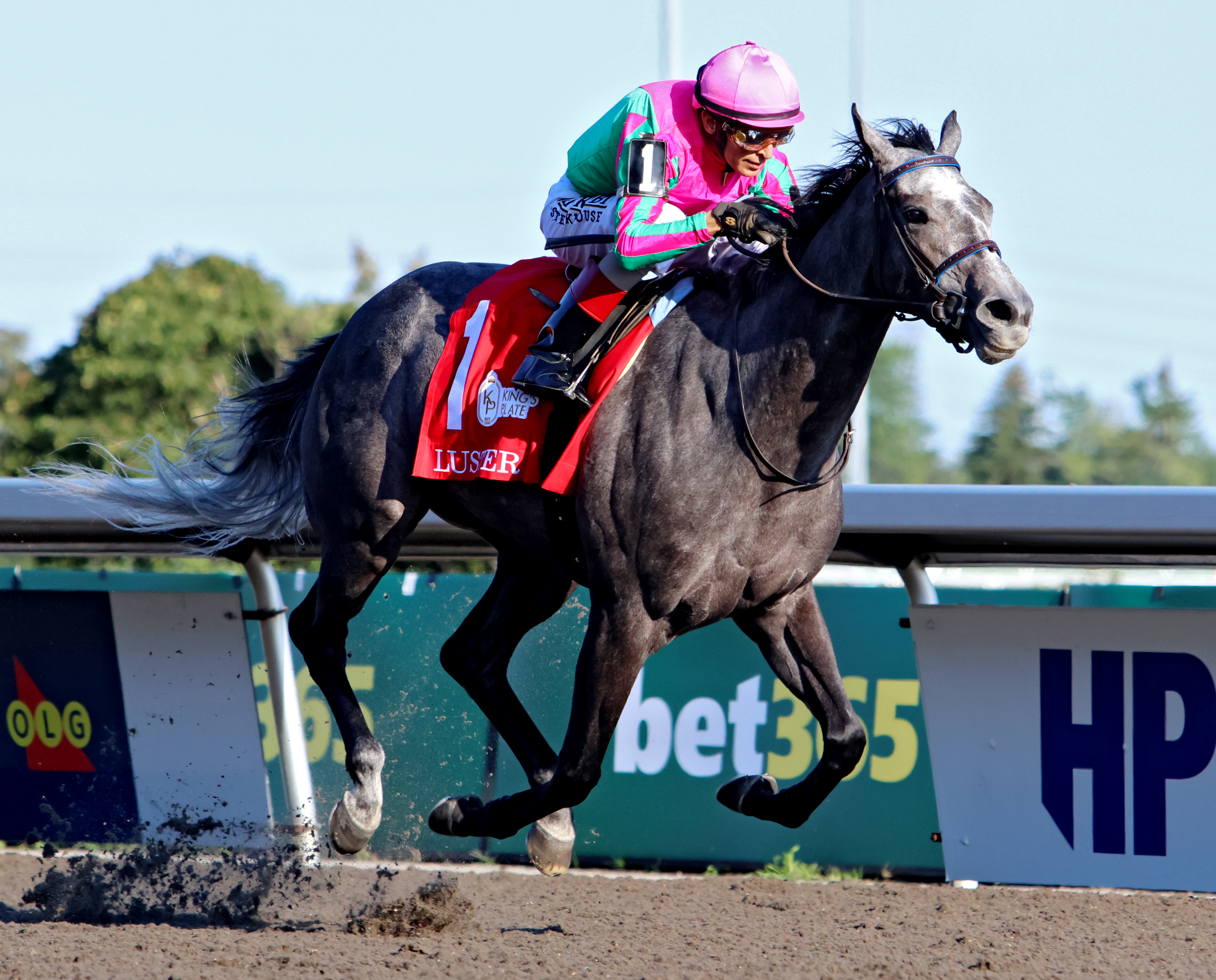
- Luster, 2026 King's Plate winner
- Class: Restricted
- Location: Woodbine Racetrack; Toronto, Ontario, Canada
- Inaugurated: 1860 (166 years ago)
- Race type: Flat / Thoroughbred
- Website: woodbine.com/kingsplate

Race information
- Distance: 1 1/4 mi (2 km)
- Surface: Tapeta
- Track: Left-handed
- Qualification: 3-year-old Canadian-bred
- Weight: Colt/Gelding: 126 lb (57 kg); Filly: 121 lb (55 kg)
- Purse: CDN$1 million

The King's Plate (known as the Queen's Plate from 1860 to 1901 and 1952 to 2022) is Canada's oldest Thoroughbred horse race and the oldest continuously run race in North America, having been founded in 1860. It is run at a distance of 1 1/4 miles (2 kilometres) for a maximum of 17 three-year-old thoroughbred horses foaled in Canada.

The race is the first in the Canadian Triple Crown, typically taking place each summer at Woodbine Racetrack in Etobicoke, Ontario. The event was scheduled in June or July until 2020, when it was postponed to September, due to government-imposed restrictions in place through the COVID-19 pandemic. Since 2021, Woodbine ran the Queen's Plate, and now runs the King's Plate, in August.

The race's name reflects the title of the reigning Canadian monarch, following on Queen Victoria's donation of the first cup. The Woodbine Entertainment Group, which owns and operates the event, announced in December 2022 the race would be renamed the King's Plate, following the accession of King Charles III on 8 September 2022.

== History ==
In 1859, the then-President of the Toronto Turf Club, Sir Casimir Gzowski, petitioned Queen Victoria to grant a plate for a new race in the Canada West (today Ontario). With the monarch's approval, the first Queen's Plate was run on 27 June 1860, at the Carleton racetrack in Toronto, with the prize of "a plate to the value of 50 guineas". Despite the name, the winning owner is presented with a gold cup, rather than a plate.

The race was originally restricted to three-year-olds bred in Canada that had never won a stakes race and was run in heats, with a horse having to win two heats to be declared the winner. The race conditions have since evolved; heat racing was discontinued in 1879 and, around the same time, the race was opened to stakes winners (some early records are incomplete). For many years, the race was open to older horses and, in the early 1900s, was even open to two-year-olds. The King's Plate is currently restricted to three-year-olds foaled in Canada. The owner must pay a nomination fee ($500 in 2018) in February, a second subscription fee ($1,500 in 2018) in May, and a final entry fee ($10,000) prior to the race.

King's Plate, Woodbine Race track [ca. 1950]

The first four renewals were run at Carleton racetrack. After that, the Queen's Plate became a "movable feast", with politicians from all over modern-day Ontario vying to host the race in their constituency. Fifteen different race tracks hosted the race over the next two decades, with distances varying from one to two miles. In 1883, the race moved to Old Woodbine, located in eastern Toronto along Lake Ontario. The race continued to be held at Old Woodbine until that track was replaced by "New" Woodbine in northern Toronto in 1956. The race has been run at Woodbine ever since. In 2006, Woodbine changed the track surface for the main track from natural dirt to a synthetic surface known as Polytrack. In 2016, the surface was changed to Tapeta. Because of the change in racing surfaces, Woodbine maintains several sets of track and stakes records. The fastest time for the race on the original dirt surface at the current 1 1/4 mi (2 km) distance is 2:01 4/5, set by Kinghaven Farms' Izvestia in 1990. The current stakes record (the fastest all-time) is 2:01.48, set by Moira in 2022 on Tapeta.

In 1902, the year after Victoria's death, the race became the King's Plate, after her successor, Edward VII. It became the Queen's Plate again during the reign of Elizabeth II (1952–2022). In 2022, it reverted to the King's Plate upon the accession of Charles III.

Horses owned by Windfields Farm have won the Plate eleven times, but the most successful was the stable owned by Joseph E. Seagram, a prominent distiller from Waterloo, Ontario. Seagram's stable won the Plate on twenty occasions between 1891 and 1935 including eight times in a row between 1891 and 1898, and ten times in eleven years from 1891 to 1901.

At the 1925 King's Plate, W. A. Hewitt and his son Foster Hewitt called the first horse race broadcast on radio.

In 1964, Northern Dancer, the first Canadian-bred horse to win the Kentucky Derby, also won the Queen's Plate in his final race.

In 2006, Josie Carroll became the first woman trainer to win the Queen's Plate. The following year, Emma-Jayne Wilson became the first female jockey to win the race.

The 2004–2013 Plate winners had little success in their subsequent racing careers. This compares unfavourably to the 1990s when a number of Plate winners had considerable success thereafter, including With Approval, Izvestia, Dance Smartly and Awesome Again. The more recent Queen's Plate winners have also been successful, including Lexie Lou (who became a multiple graded stakes winner in Canada and the US after winning the Plate in 2014) and Shaman Ghost (a Grade I winner in America after winning the Plate in 2015).

Nick Eaves, former president and CEO of Woodbine Entertainment Group, announced during the 2012 Queen's Plate post position draw that Woodbine Racetrack might be forced to close in April 2013 due to the cancellation of Slots at Racetrack program partnerships between Ontario's racetracks and the Ontario Lottery and Gaming Corporation. Eaves said that if Woodbine is not open, "there won't be a Queen's Plate." A new funding agreement was put in place in March 2013, which ensured the continuation of horse racing at Woodbine.

40 fillies have won the Plate, beginning with Brunette in 1864. The 2017 running was won by the filly Holy Helena, while the 2018 running was won by Wonder Gadot. Two chestnut fillies both by the name of Wild Rose have won the Queen's Plate, in 1867 and 1886. They were the daughter and great-great-granddaughter respectively of Yellow Rose, who also produced the first Queen's Plate winner Don Juan. The latest filly to win the King's Plate was Luster in 2026.

The race has been held at a variety of distances:

- 1860–1867: 1-mile (1.6 km) heats
- 1868–1870: 2 miles (3.2 km)
- 1871: 1 3/4 miles (2.82 km)
- 1872–1886: 1 1/2 miles (2.4 km)
- 1887–1923: 1 1/4 miles (2.01 km)
- 1924–1956: 1 1/8 miles (1.811 km)
- 1957-: 1 1/4 miles (2.01 km)

=== Triple Crown dispute with Fort Erie Race Track ===
Since 2021, a year after the Queen's Plate was moved to September from its usual June or July spot due to the COVID-19 pandemic in Canada, Woodbine has run the race in August. As a result, Fort Erie Race Track, which runs the second of Canada's Triple Crown races, the Prince of Wales Stakes, moved their race to after the King's Plate. In April 2023, a few months after Woodbine announced that the 2023 King's Plate would again be run in August, Fort Erie filed a grievance with the Canadian Trade Commission over what it called business practices that were "unfair and clearly predatory." A member of the Fort Erie Council suggested that the COVID pandemic was over and that the King's Plate should move back to June, adding that continuing to run the race in August would not be in Fort Erie Race Track's best economic interests, as it would result in the Prince of Wales Stakes being run after Labour Day, when the key summer tourism season is over. Woodbine responded that Fort Erie's allegations are "baseless and without merit" and that they would defend themselves if requested by the Trade Commission.

== Royal patronage ==
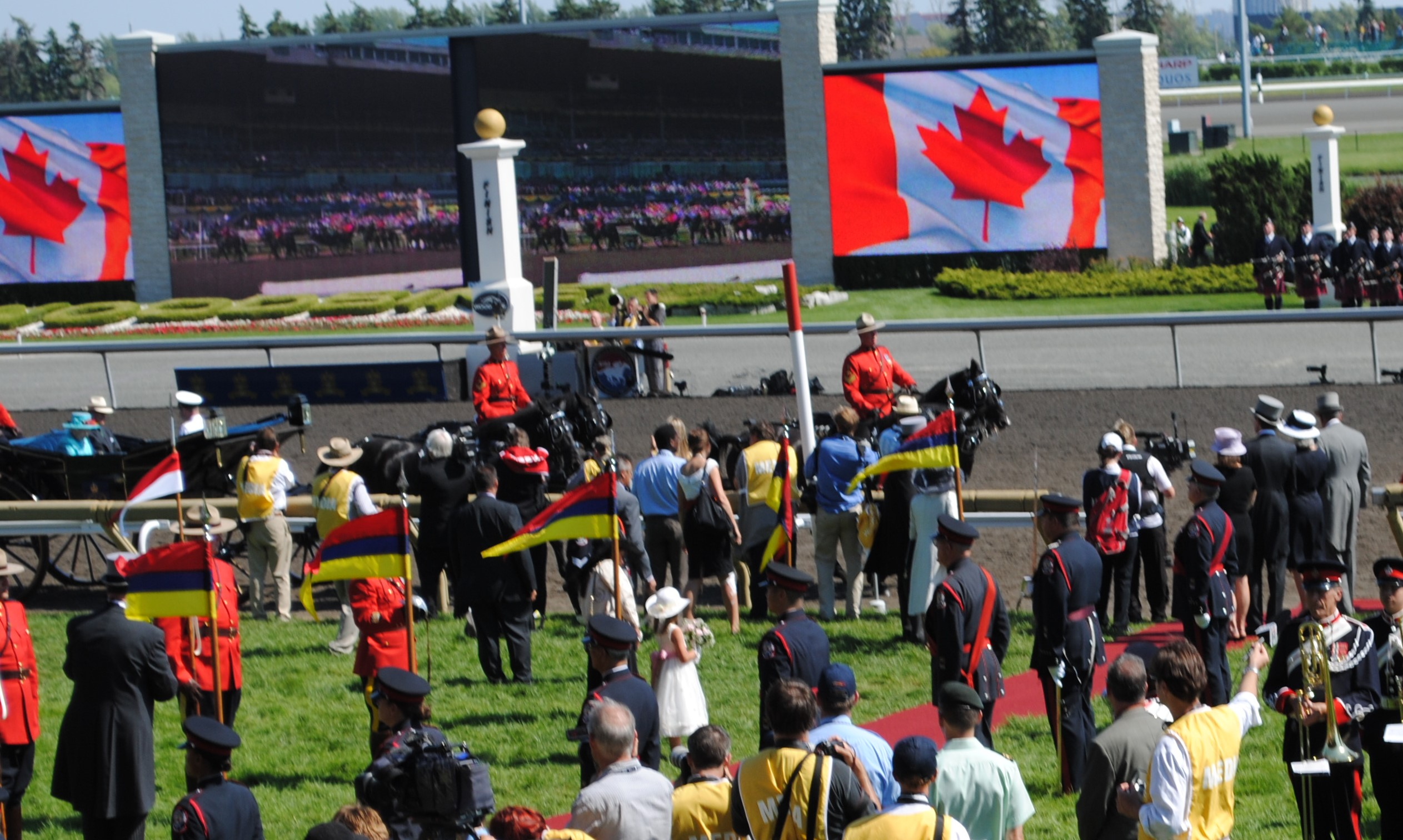
Queen Elizabeth II (at far left) arriving at the 2010 Queen's Plate

As King of Canada, Charles III is patron of the event. Various other members of the Canadian royal family have attended, beginning with John Campbell, Marquess of Lorne, and his wife, Princess Louise, in 1881, when Lorne was serving as governor general of Canada and the couple was touring Ontario. Queen Elizabeth II's fourth and final visit to the race was in early July 2010.

== Records ==
Stakes record

- Dirt – Izvestia — 2:01 4/5 (1990)
- Synthetic dirt - Moira – 2.01.48 (2022)

Winningest jockeys:

- 4 – Avelino Gomez (1957, 1960, 1966, 1969)
- 4 – Sandy Hawley (1970, 1971, 1975, 1978)
- 4 – Robin Platts (1972, 1974, 1977, 1984)

Winningest trainers:

- 8 – Harry Giddings Jr. (1911, 1913, 1914, 1920, 1931, 1932, 1934, 1942)
- 8 – Roger Attfield (1976, 1987, 1989, 1990, 1992, 1993, 1995, 2008)
- 6 – John R. Walker (1891, 1892, 1893, 1894, 1895, 1896)
- 6 – Gordon J. "Pete" McCann (1940, 1951, 1953, 1957, 1959, 1963)
- 6 - William H. Bringloe (1923, 1926, 1928, 1933, 1936, 1937)

Winningest owners:

- 20 - Seagram Stables
- 11 - Windfields Farm

== Winners ==
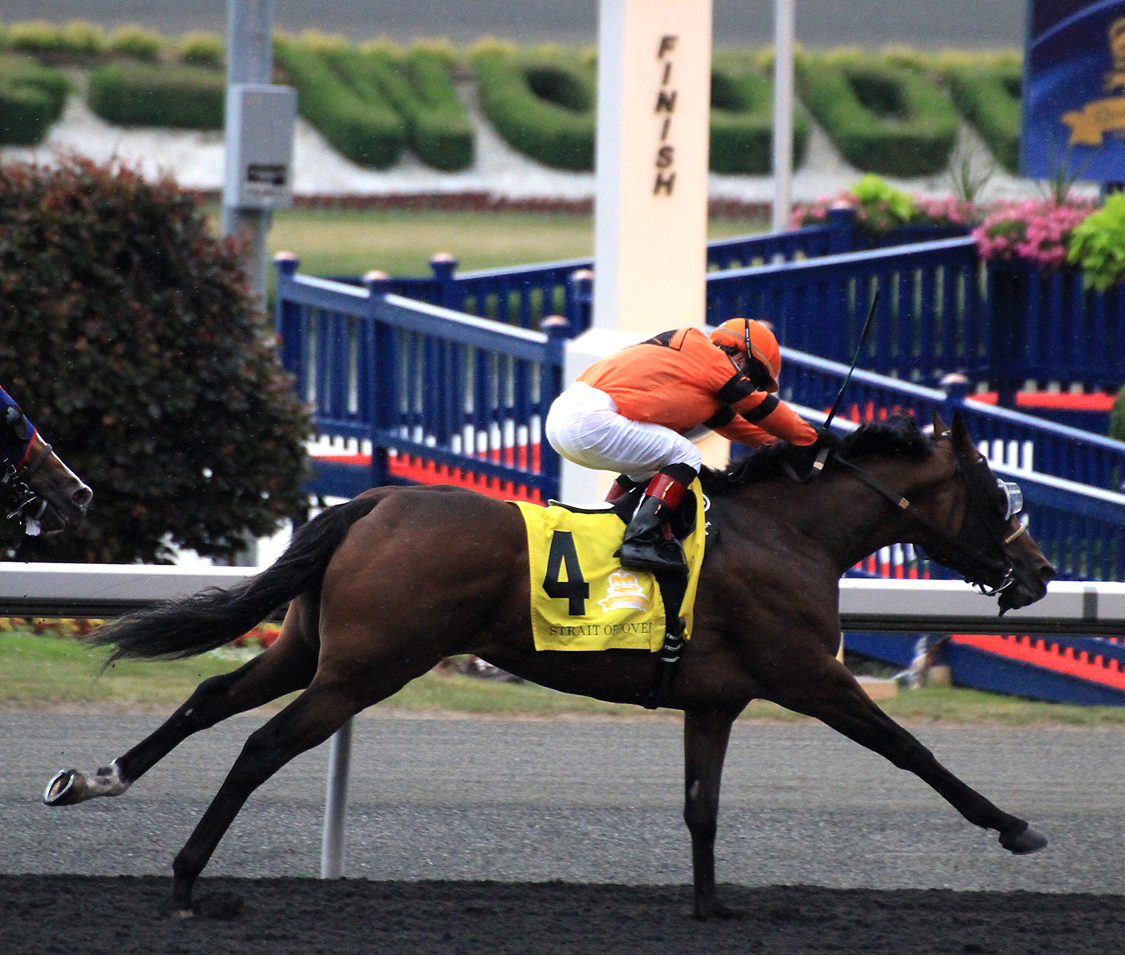
2012 winner,
Strait of Dover

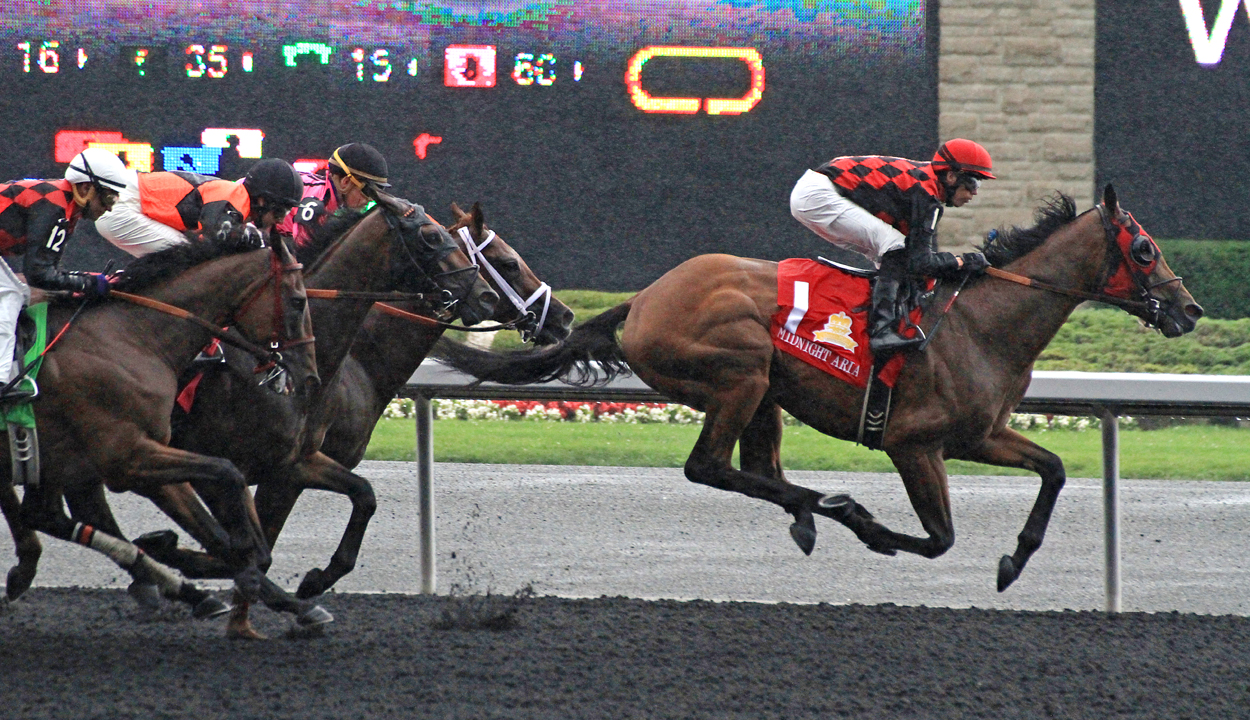
2013 winner,
Midnight Aria

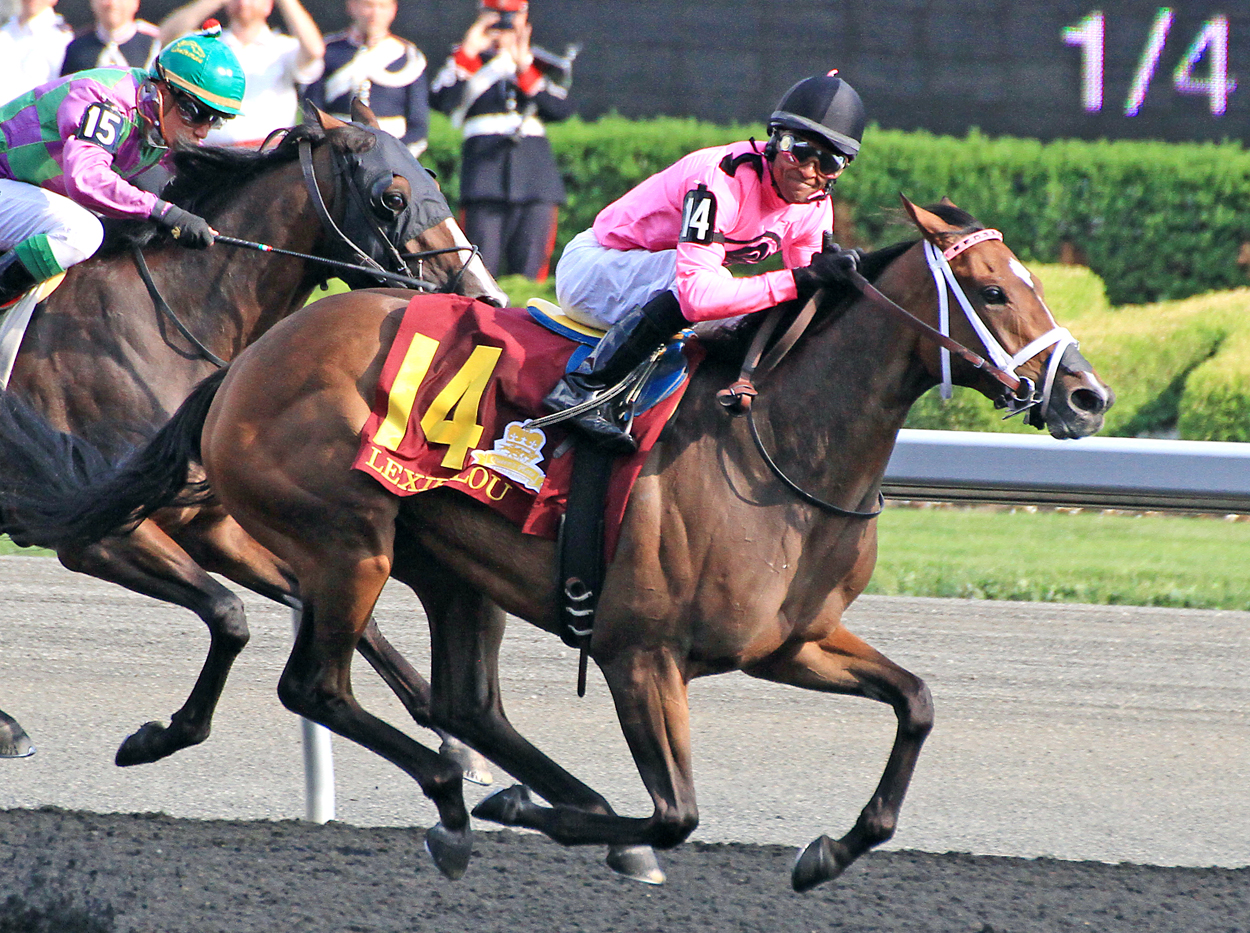
2014 winner,
Lexie Lou

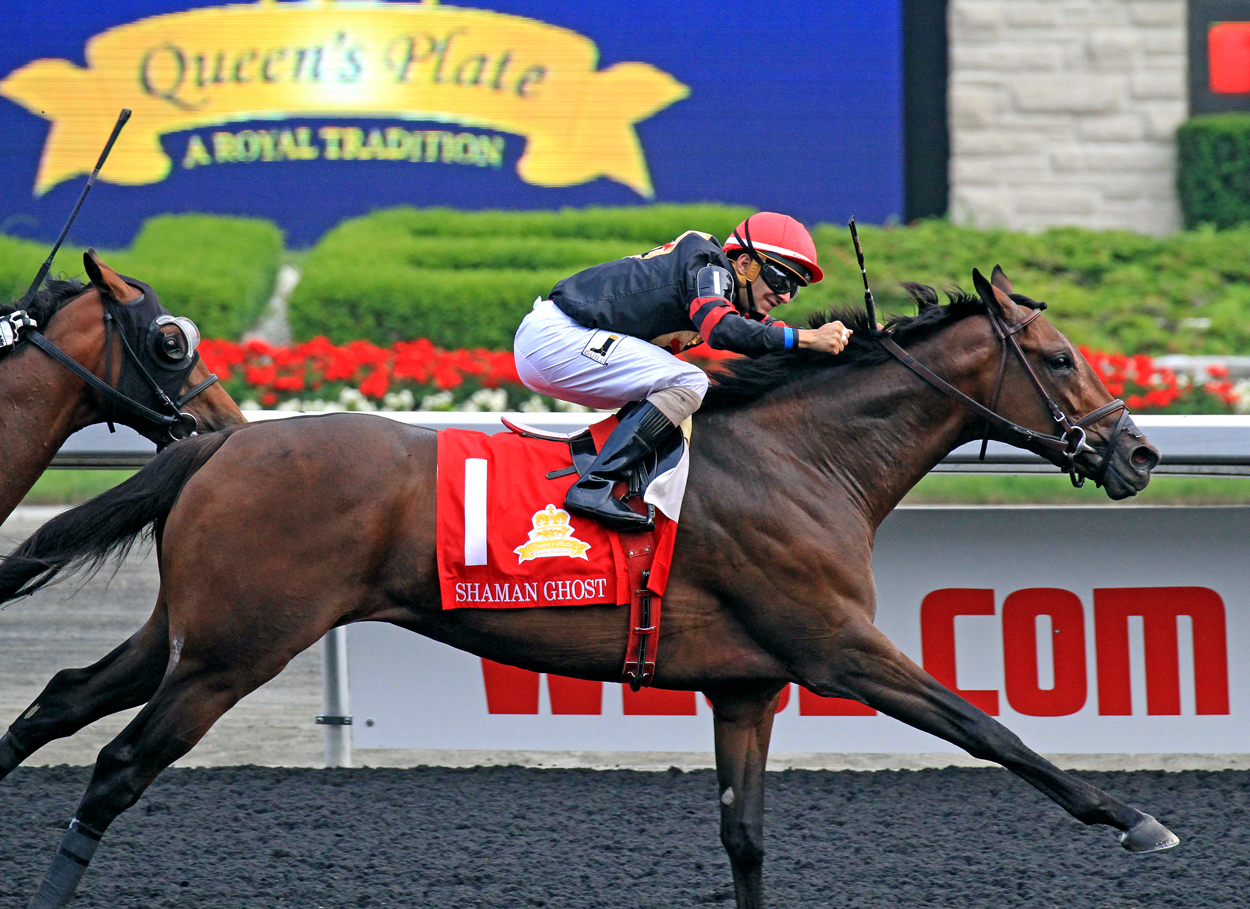
2015 winner,
Shaman Ghost

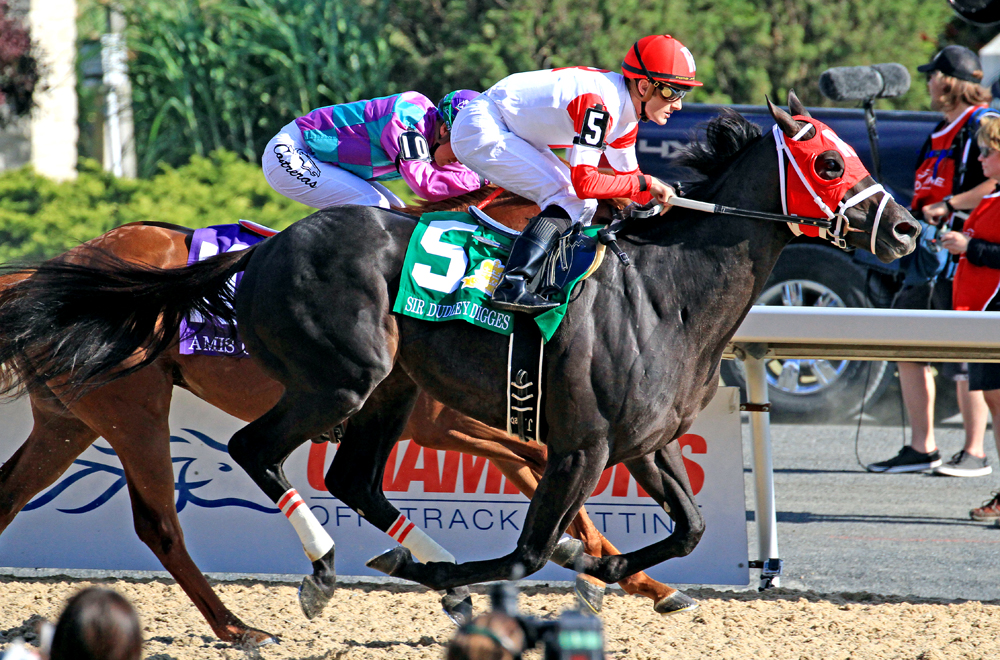
2016 winner,
Sir Dudley Digges

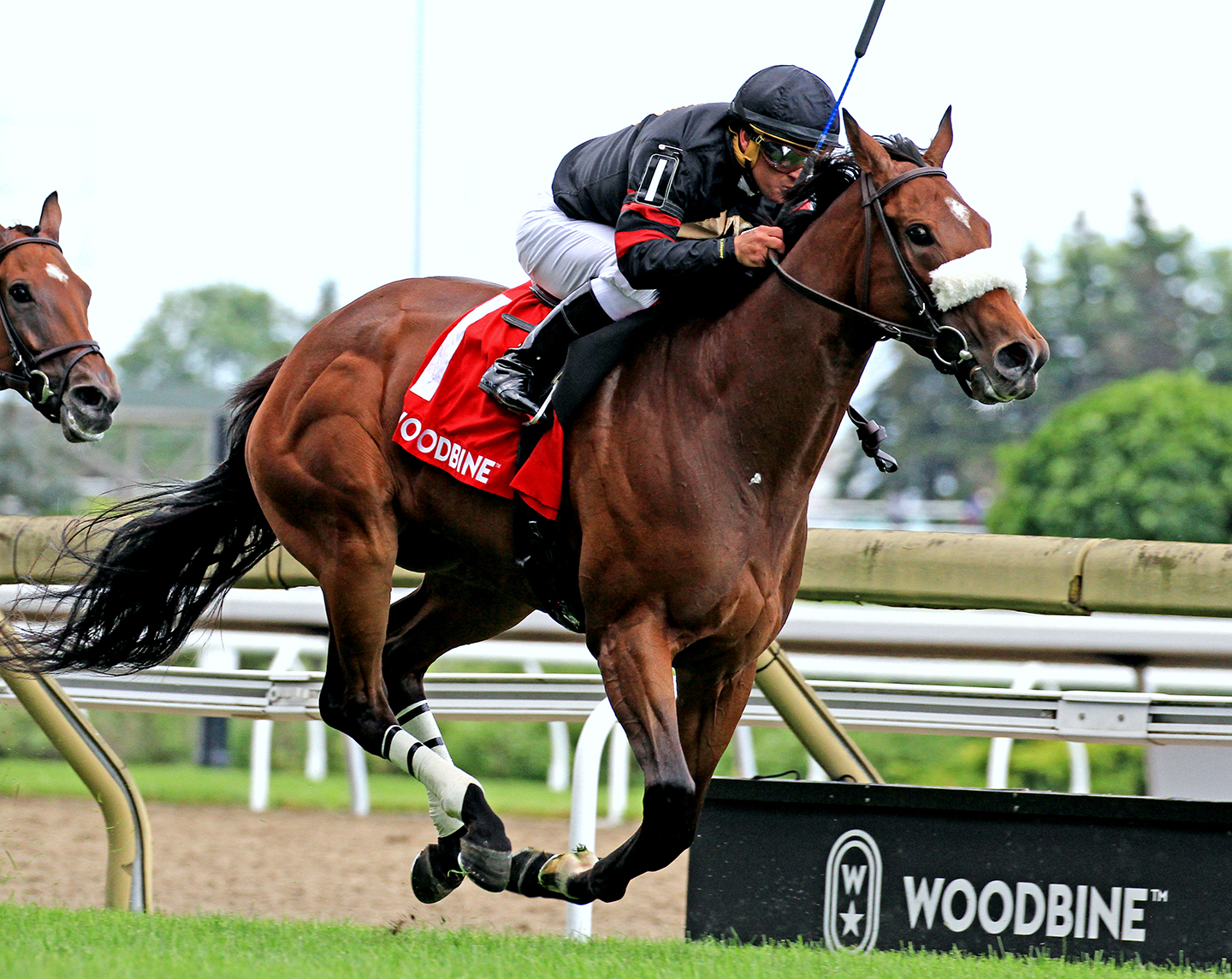
2017 winner,
Holy Helena

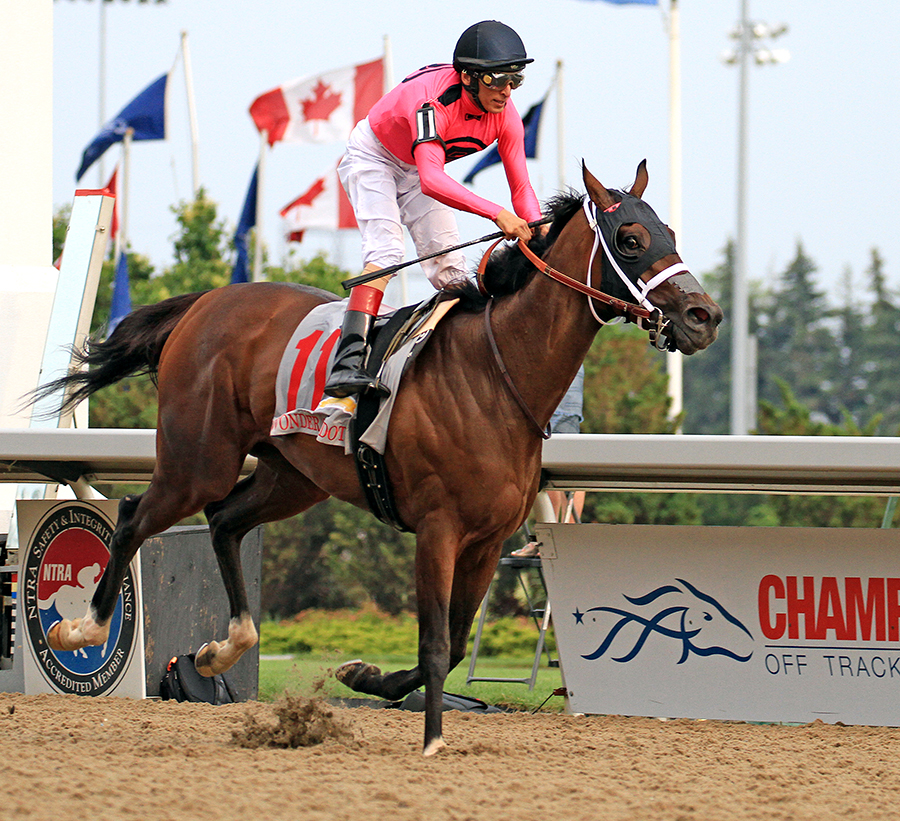
2018 winner,
Wonder Gadot

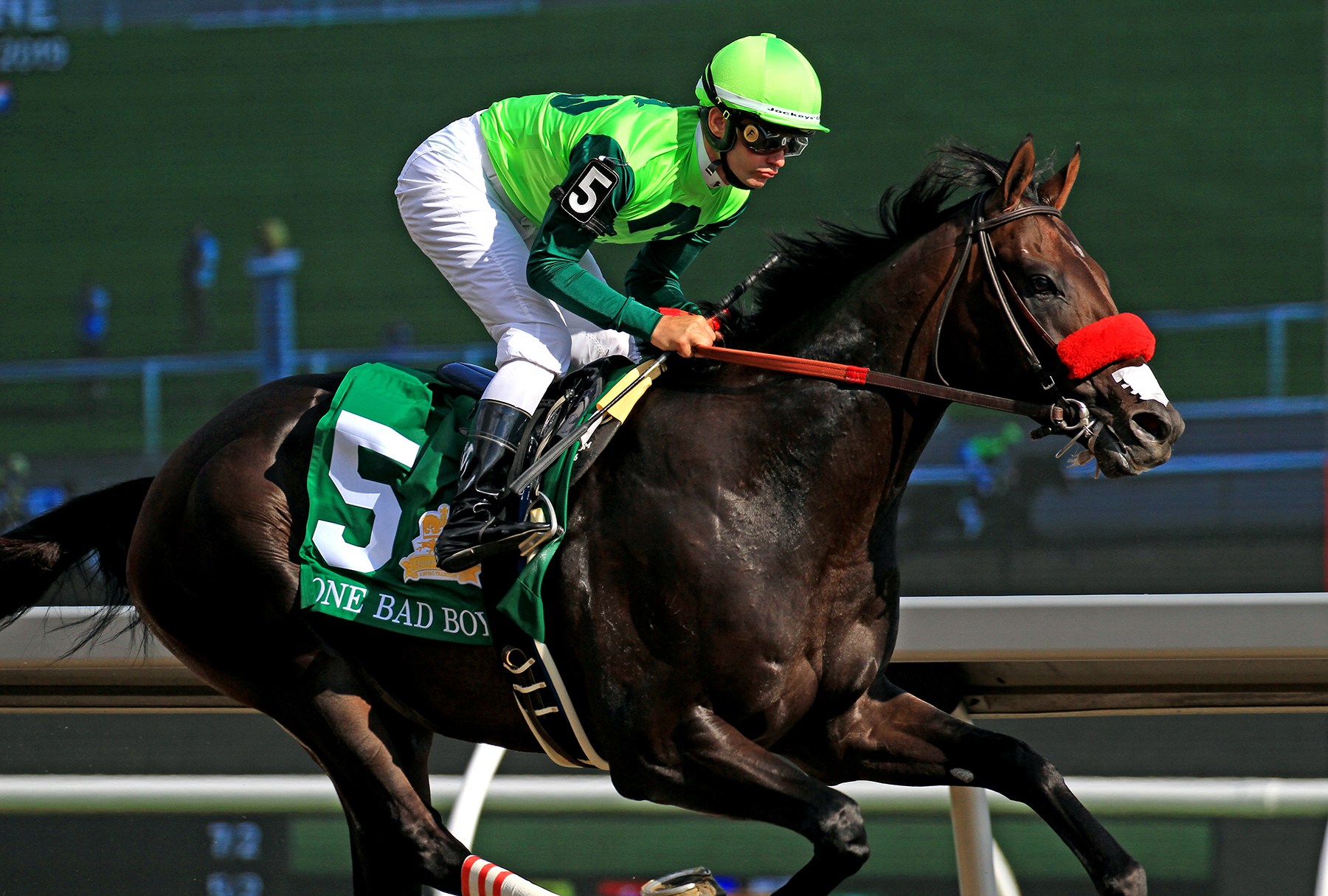
2019 winner,
One Bad Boy

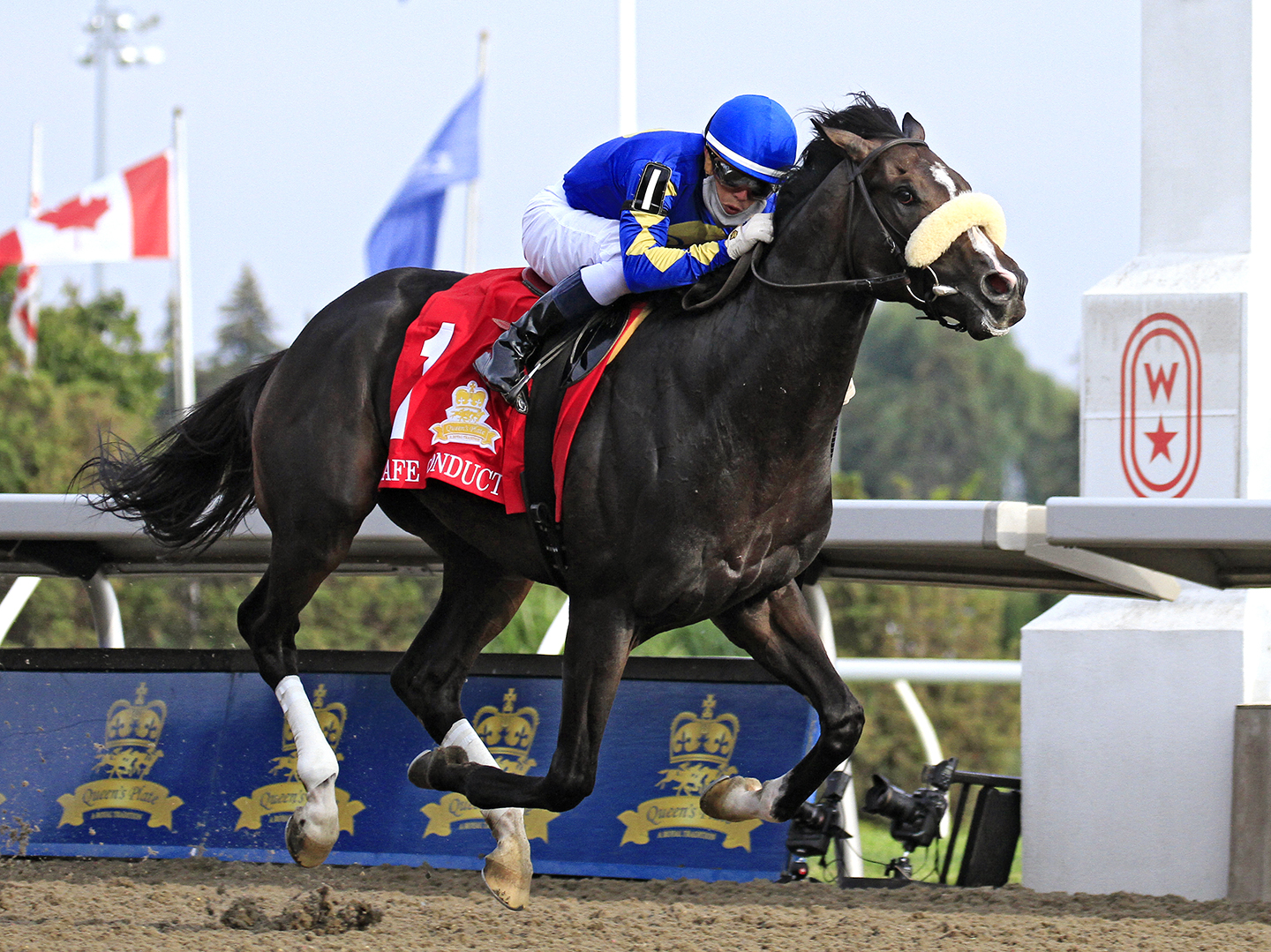
2021 winner,
Safe Conduct

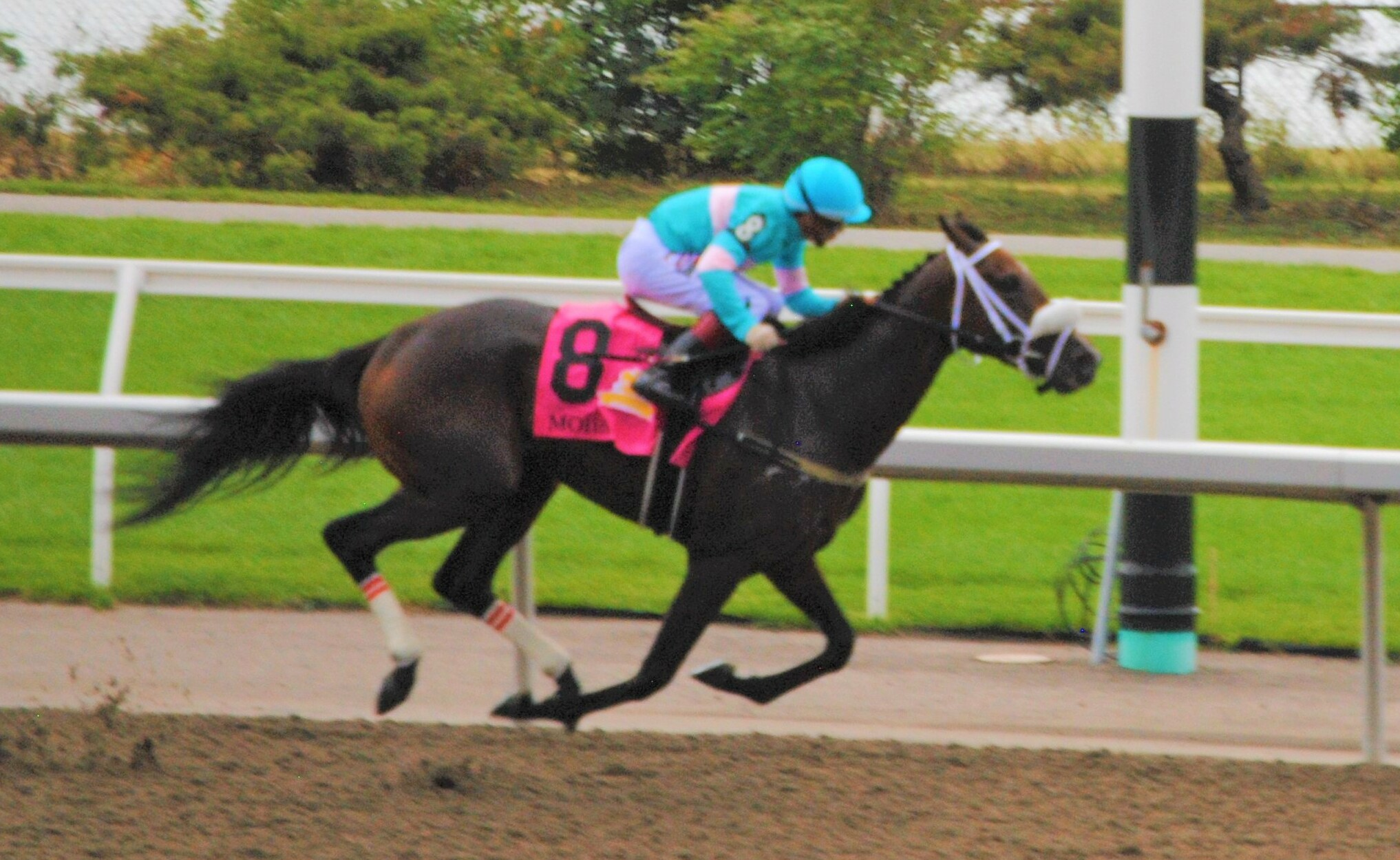
2022 winner,
Moira

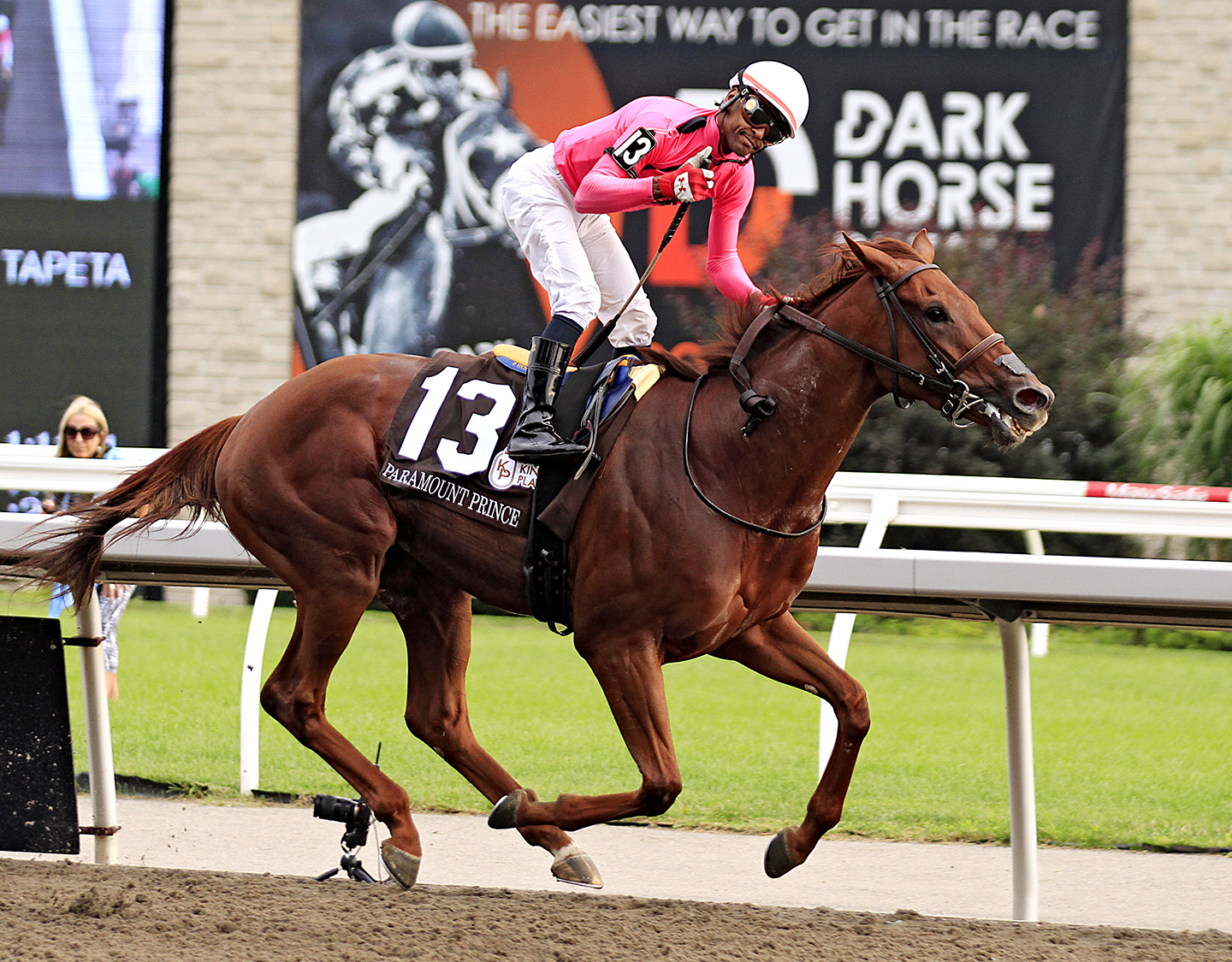
2023 winner,
Paramount Prince

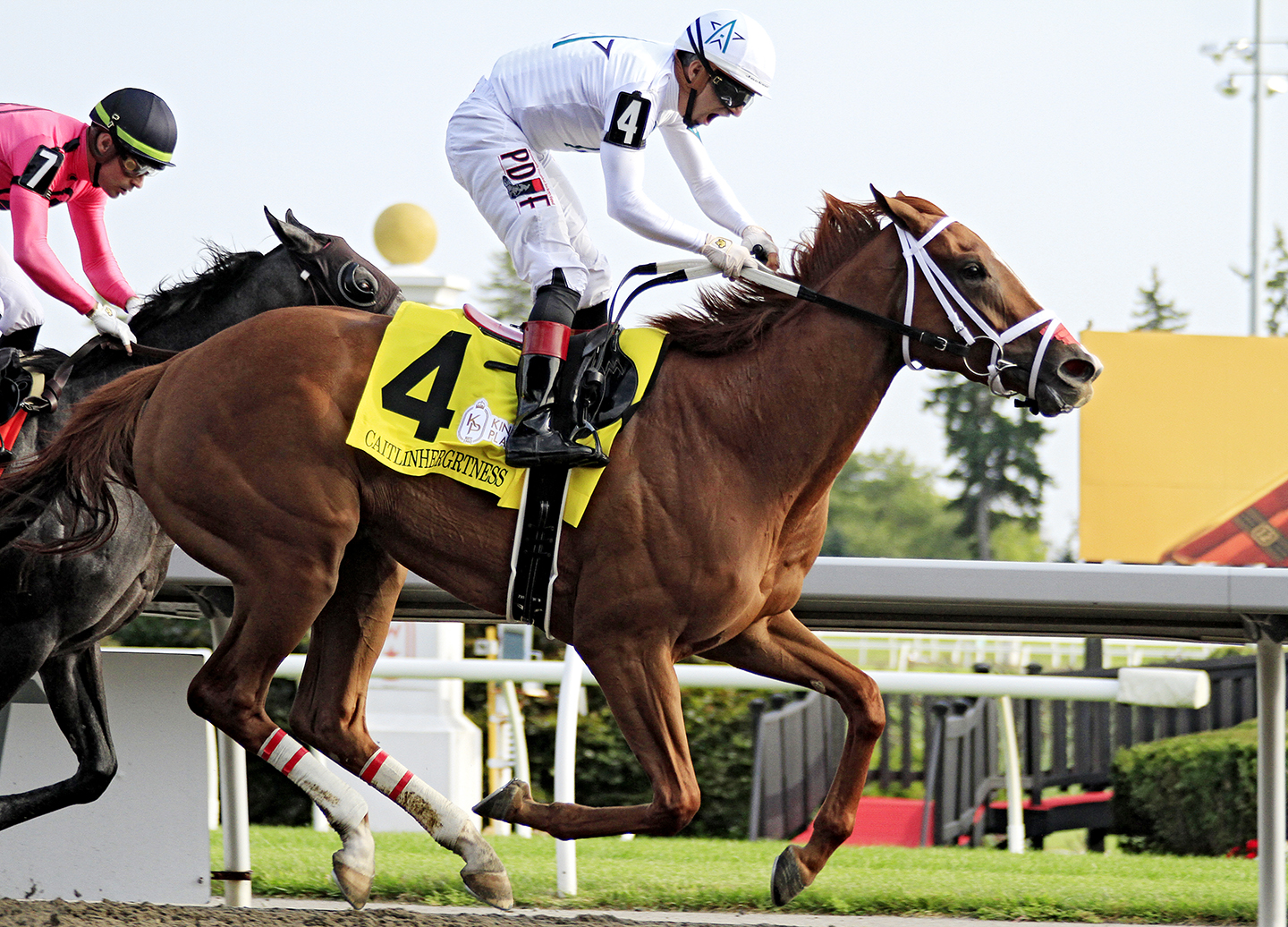
2024 winner,
Caitlinhergrtness

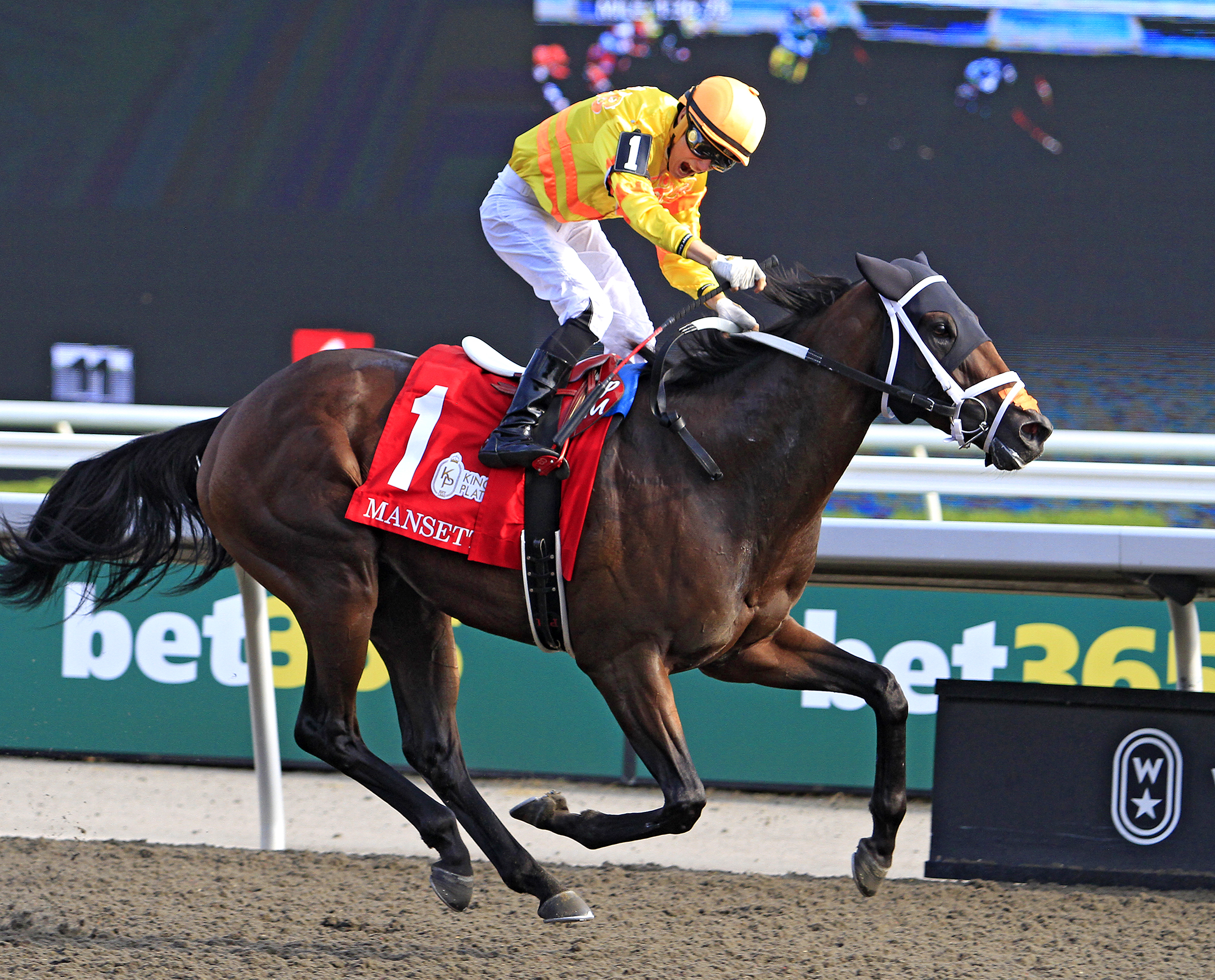
2025 winner,
Mansetti

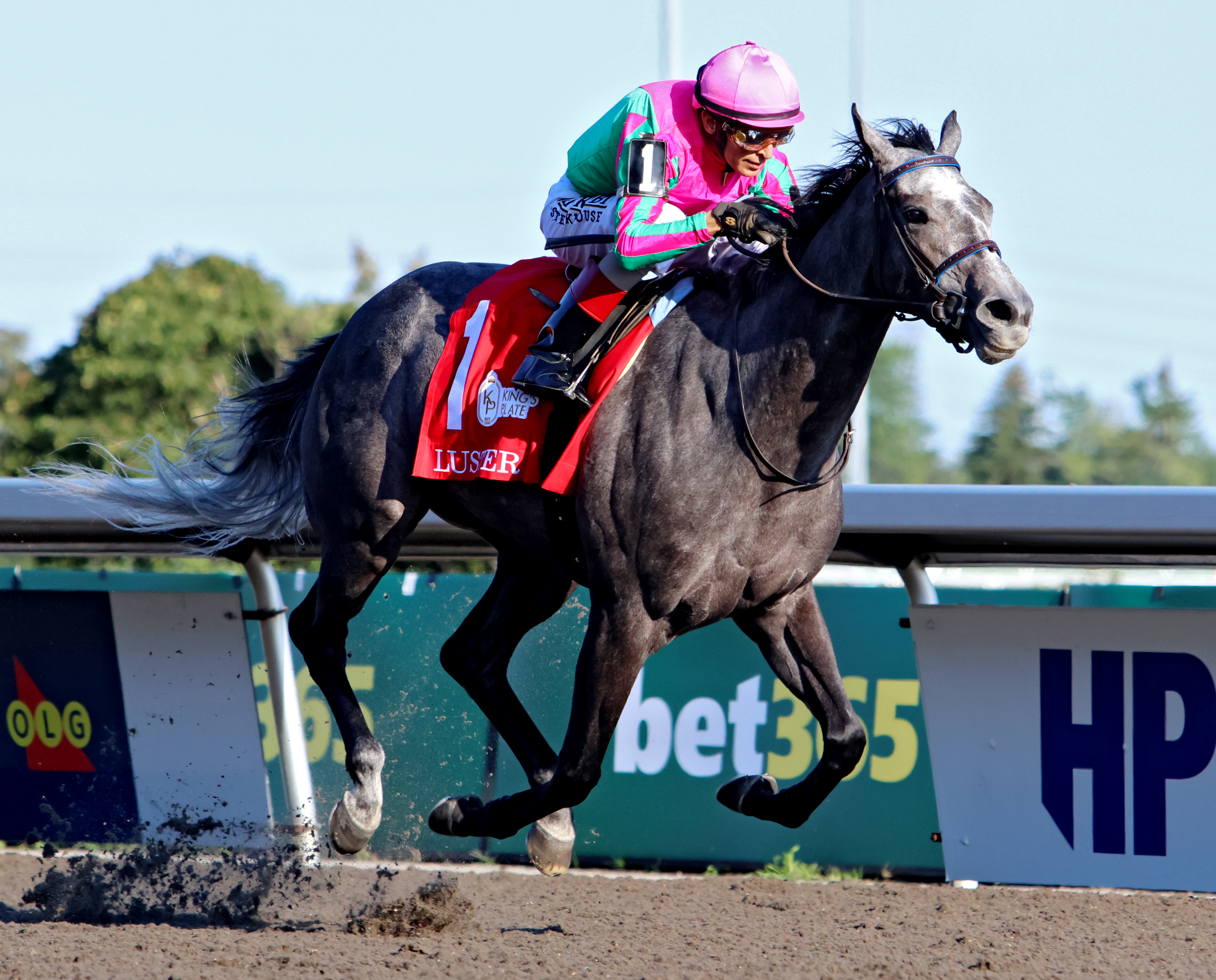
2026 winner,
Luster

Year	Winner	Jockey	Trainer	Owner	Time
2026	Luster †	John R. Velazquez	Josie Carroll	Gainesway Stable & Andrew Rosen	2:02.01
2025	Mansetti	Pietro Moran	Kevin Attard	Al Ulwelling & Bill Ulwelling	2:03.68
2024	Caitlinhergrtness †	Rafael M. Hernandez	Kevin Attard	Siena Farm LLC and WinStar Farm LLC	2:03.45
2023	Paramount Prince	Patrick Husbands	Mark E. Casse	Michael J. Langlois & Gary Barber	2:01.93
2022	Moira †	Rafael M. Hernandez	Kevin Attard	X-Men Racing LLC, Madaket Stables LLC & SF Racing LLC	2:01.48
2021	Safe Conduct	Irad Ortiz Jr.	Philip M. Serpe	WellSpring Stables	2:02.85
2020	Mighty Heart	Daisuke Fukumoto	Josie Carroll	Lawrence P. Cordes	2:01.98
2019	One Bad Boy	Flavien Prat	Richard Baltas	Sayjay Racing	2:02.98
2018	Wonder Gadot †	John R. Velazquez	Mark E. Casse	Gary Barber	2:02.26
2017	Holy Helena †	Luis Contreras	James A. Jerkens	Stronach Stables	2:02.87
2016	Sir Dudley Digges	Julien Leparoux	Michael J. Maker	Kenneth & Sarah Ramsey	2:04.09
2015	Shaman Ghost	Rafael M. Hernandez	Brian A. Lynch	Stronach Stables	2:03.45
2014	Lexie Lou †	Patrick Husbands	Mark E. Casse	Gary Barber	2:03:94
2013	Midnight Aria	Jesse M. Campbell	Nicholas Gonzalez	Tucci Stables	2:04.72
2012	Strait of Dover	Justin Stein	Danny Vella	Canyon Farms	2:01.99
2011	Inglorious †	Luis Contreras	Josie Carroll	Donver Stable	2:02.63
2010	Big Red Mike	Eurico Rosa da Silva	Nicholas Gonzalez	Terra Racing Stable	2:04.89
2009	Eye of the Leopard	Eurico Rosa da Silva	Mark Frostad	Sam-Son Farm	2:03.84
2008	Not Bourbon	Jono Jones	Roger Attfield	Charles E. Fipke	2:03.59
2007	Mike Fox	Emma-Jayne Wilson	Ian Black	D. Morgan Firestone	2:05.45
2006	Edenwold	Emile Ramsammy	Josie Carroll	Jim & Alice Sapara	2:05.30
2005	Wild Desert	Pat Valenzuela	Robert J. Frankel	Daniel Borislow & Partners	2:07.37
2004	Niigon	Robert Landry	Eric Coatrieux	Chiefswood Stable	2:04.72
2003	Wando	Patrick Husbands	Michael Keogh	Gus Schickedanz	2:02.48
2002	T J's Lucky Moon	Steve Bahen	Vito Armata	Molinaro Stable	2:06.88
2001	Dancethruthedawn †	Gary Boulanger	Mark Frostad	Sam-Son Farm	2:03.78
2000	Scatter the Gold	Todd Kabel	Mark Frostad	Sam-Son Farm	2:05.53
1999	Woodcarver	Mickey Walls	Michael Keogh	Gus Schickedanz	2:03.13
1998	Archers Bay	Kent Desormeaux	Todd Pletcher	Melnyk & Bristow	2:02.10
1997	Awesome Again	Mike E. Smith	David Hofmans	Frank Stronach	2:04.20
1996	Victor Cooley	Emile Ramsammy	Mark Frostad	Windways Farm	2:03.80
1995	Regal Discovery	Todd Kabel	Roger Attfield	No. 1 Stable	2:03.80
1994	Basqueian	Jack Lauzon	Daniel J. Vella	Frank Stronach	2:03.40
1993	Peteski	Craig Perret	Roger Attfield	Earle I. Mack	2:04.20
1992	Alydeed	Craig Perret	Roger Attfield	Kinghaven Farms	2:04.60
1991	Dance Smartly †	Pat Day	Jim Day	Sam-Son Farm	2:03.40
1990	Izvestia	Don Seymour	Roger Attfield	Kinghaven Farms	2:01.80
1989	With Approval	Don Seymour	Roger Attfield	Kinghaven Farms	2:03.00
1988	Regal Intention	Jack Lauzon	Jim Day	Sam-Son Farm	2:06.20
1987	Market Control	Ken Skinner	Roger Attfield	Kinghaven Farms	2:03.60
1986	Golden Choice	Vincent Bracciale Jr.	Michael Tammaro	Dick Sanderson	2:07.20
1985	La Lorgnette †	David Clark	Macdonald Benson	Windfields Farm	2:04.60
1984	Key to the Moon	Robin Platts	Gil Rowntree	B. K. Y. Stable	2:03.80
1983	Bompago	Larry Attard	John Cardella	Carl Cardella & Partners	2:04.20
1982	Son of Briartic	Paul Souter	Jerry G. Lavigne	Paddockhurst Stable	2:04.60
1981	Fiddle Dancer Boy	David Clark	James C. Bentley	John B. W. Carmichael	2:04.80
1980	Driving Home	William Parsons	Glenn Mangusson	CFCW Racing Stable	2:04.20
1979	Steady Growth	Brian Swatuk	John J. Tammaro Jr.	Kinghaven Farms	2:06.60
1978	Regal Embrace	Sandy Hawley	Macdonald Benson	Windfields Farm	2:02.00
1977	Sound Reason	Robin Platts	Gil Rowntree	Stafford Farms	2:06.60
1976	Norcliffe	Jeffrey Fell	Roger Attfield	Norcliffe Stable	2:05.00
1975	L'Enjoleur	Sandy Hawley	Yonnie Starr	J. Louis Lévesque	2:02.60
1974	Amber Herod	Robin Platts	Gil Rowntree	Stafford Farms	2:09.20
1973	Royal Chocolate	Ted Colangelo	Gil Rowntree	Stafford Farms	2:08.20
1972	Victoria Song	Robin Platts	Larry Grant	Green Hills Farm	2:03.20
1971	Kennedy Road	Sandy Hawley	James C. Bentley	Helen G. Stollery	2:03.00
1970	Almoner	Sandy Hawley	Jerry G. Lavigne	Parkview Stable	2:04.80
1969	Jumpin Joseph	Avelino Gomez	Robert S. Bateman	Warren Beasely	2:04.20
1968	Merger	Wayne Harris	Roy Johnson	Golden West Farms	2:05.20
1967	Jammed Lovely †	Jim Fitzsimmons	Yonnie Starr	Conn Smythe	2:03.00
1966	Titled Hero	Avelino Gomez	Patrick MacMurchy	Peter K. Marshall	2:03.60
1965	Whistling Sea	Tak Inouye	Roy Johnson	Olivier Ranches	2:03.80
1964	Northern Dancer	Bill Hartack	Horatio Luro	Windfields Farm	2:02.20
1963	Canebora	Manuel Ycaza	Gordon J. McCann	Windfields Farm	2:04.00
1962	Flaming Page †	Jim Fitzsimmons	Horatio Luro	Windfields Farm	2:04.60
1961	Blue Light	Hugo Dittfach	Patrick MacMurchy	Col. K. R. Marshall	2:05.00
1960	Victoria Park	Avelino Gomez	Horatio Luro	Windfields Farm	2:02.00
1959	New Providence	Bobby Ussery	Gordon J. McCann	Windfields Farm	2:04.80
1958	Caledon Beau	Al Coy	Yonnie Starr	Conn Smythe	2:04.20
1957	Lyford Cay	Avelino Gomez	Gordon J. McCann	E. P. Taylor	2:02.60
1956	Canadian Champ	David Stevenson	John Passero	William R. Beasley	1:55.00
1955	Ace Marine	George Walker	Yonnie Starr	Larkin Maloney	1:52.40
1954	Collisteo	Chris Rogers	Richard Townrow	Bur-Fit Stable	1:52.00
1953	Canadiana †	Eddie Arcaro	Gordon J. McCann	E. P. Taylor	1:52.20
1952	Epigram	Gil Robillard	Stanley V. Bowden	Three V's Stable	1:58.60
1951	Major Factor	Alf Bavington	Gordon J. McCann	E. P. Taylor	1:53.00
1950	McGill	Chris Rogers	Pete Keiser	Vincent J. Sheridan	1:52.40
1949	Epic	Chris Rogers	Bert Alexandra	E. P. Taylor	1:52.20
1948	Last Mark	Howard R. Bailey	Jim G. Fair	Jim G. Fair	1:52.00
1947	Moldy	Colin McDonald	Arthur Brent	Parkwood Stable	1:54.20
1946	Kingarvie	Johnny Dewhurst	Arthur Brent	Parkwood Stable	1:55.60
1945	Uttermost	Robert B. Watson	Cecil Howard	Harry C. Hatch	1:53.80
1944	Acara	Robert B. Watson	Cecil Howard	Harry C. Hatch	1:54.80
1943	Paolita †	Pat Remillard	William Thurner	Charles H. Hemstead	2:02.60
1942	Ten to Ace	Charles W. Smith	Harry Giddings Jr.	Harry Giddings Jr.	1:57.80
1941	Budpath	Robert B. Watson	Loyd Gentry Sr.	Harry C. Hatch	1:56.80
1940	Willie the Kid	Ronnie Nash	Gordon J. McCann	Mildred A. Kane	1:55.80
1939	Archworth	Sydney Denny Birley	Mark Cowell	C. George McCullagh	1:54.40
1938	Bunty Lawless	John W. Bailey	Jack Anderson	Willie F. Morrissey	1:54.40
1937	Goldlure	Stirling Young	William H. Bringloe	Harry C. Hatch	1:55.40
1936	Monsweep	Danny Brammer	William H. Bringloe	Harry C. Hatch	1:55.00
1935	Sally Fuller †	Herb Lindberg	Johnny Thorpe	Seagram Stables	1:55.40
1934	Horometer	Frankie Mann	Harry Giddings Jr.	Col. Samuel McLaughlin	1:54.20
1933	King O'Connor	Eddie Legere	William H. Bringloe	Seagram Stables	1:56.40
1932	Queensway †	Frankie Mann	Harry Giddings Jr.	Robert W. R. Cowie	1:55.20
1931	Froth Blower	Frankie Mann	Harry Giddings Jr.	Robert W. R. Cowie	1:59.20
1930	Aymond	Henry Little	Jack Hutton	Ryland H. New	1:57.20
1929	Shorelint	J. D. Mooney	Fred H. Schelke	Thorncliffe Stable	1:57.60
1928	Young Kitty †	Lester Pichon	William H. Bringloe	Seagram Stables	1:57.00
1927	Troutlet †	Francis Horn	John Nixon	Ryland H. New	1:55.80
1926	Haplite	Henry Erickson	William H. Bringloe	Seagram Stables	1:59.60
1925	Fairbank †	Chick Lang	Jack Givens	James C. Fletcher	1:56.40
1924	Maternal Pride	George Walls	William G. Wilson	Hugh S. Wilson	1:57.60
1923	Flowerful	Terry Wilson	William H. Bringloe	Seagram Stables	2:11.00
1922	South Shore †	Kenny Parrington	Fred H. Schelke	Thorncliffe Stable	2:12.00
1921	Herendesy	James H. Butwell	George Walker	Brookdale Stable	2:10.00
1920	St. Paul	Roxy Romanelli	Harry Giddings Jr.	Harry Giddings Sr.	2:09.00
1919	Ladder of Light †	Lawrence Lyke	Joseph H. Doane	George W. Beardmore	2:09.40
1918	Springside	Lee Mink	Ed Whyte	George M. Hendrie	2:08.80
1917	Belle Mahone †	Frank Robinson	Barry Littlefield	Joseph E. Seagram	2:08.80
1916	Mandarin	Arthur Pickens	Barry Littlefield	Joseph E. Seagram	2:12.00
1915	Tartarean	Harry Watts	John Nixon	Charles Millar	2:09.20
1914	Beehive	Guy Burns	Harry Giddings Jr.	Harry Giddings Sr.	2:10.60
1913	Hearts of Oak	Johnny Wilson	Harry Giddings Jr.	Harry Giddings Sr.	2:09.20
1912	Heresy	Robert Small	John Nixon	Brookdale Stable	2:11.00
1911	St. Bass	Eddie Dugan	Harry Giddings Jr.	Harry Giddings Sr.	2:08.80
1910	Parmer	Johnny Wilson	John Nixon	Valley Farm Stable	2:12.40
1909	Shimonese †	Clifford Gilbert	John Nixon	Valley Farm Stable	2:10.40
1908	Seismic	Charles Fairbrother	Barry Littlefield	Joseph E. Seagram	2:11.00
1907	Kelvin	James Foley	Charles Phair	T. Ambrose Woods	2:12.60
1906	Slaughter	John K. Treubel	Barry Littlefield	Joseph E. Seagram	2:11.60
1905	Inferno	H. Kelly Phillips	Barry Littlefield	Joseph E. Seagram	2:12.00
1904	Sapper	Jimmy Walsh	John Dyment Jr.	Nathaniel Dyment	2:12.00
1903	Thessalon	Quintin Castro	John Dyment Jr.	Nathaniel Dyment	2:15.50
1902	Lyddite †	Sam Wainwright	Ed Whyte	William Hendrie	2:15.00
1901	John Ruskin	Harry Vititoe	Harry Blair	Joseph E. Seagram	2:18.75
1900	Dalmoor	Harry Lewis	Harry Blair	Joseph E. Seagram	2:14.00
1899	Butter Scotch †	R. J. Mason	Eddie Whyte	William Hendrie	2:15.50
1898	Bon Ino †	Tiny Williams	Charles Boyle	Joseph E. Seagram	2:15.50
1897	Ferdinand	Harry Lewis	Charles Boyle	Joseph E. Seagram	2:13.00
1896	Millbrook	Harry Lewis	John R. Walker	Joseph E. Seagram	2:19.00
1895	Bonniefield	Alf Brooker	John R. Walker	Joseph E. Seagram	2:17.50
1894	Joe Miller	Frank Regan	John R. Walker	Joseph E. Seagram	2:28.50
1893	Martello	Harry Blaylock	John R. Walker	Joseph E. Seagram	2:14.00
1892	O'Donohue	F. Horton	John R. Walker	Joseph E. Seagram	2:22.00
1891	Victorious	Michael Gorman	John R. Walker	Joseph E. Seagram	2:14.50
1890	Kitestring †	Fred Coleman	Daniel Curtin	Thomas D. Hodgens	2:22.00
1889	Colonist	Richard O'Leary	Richard O'Leary	J. D. Matheson	2:16.00
1888	Harry Cooper	Richard O'Leary	Richard O'Leary	J. D. Matheson	2:18.50
1887	Bonnie Duke	Charlie Wise	William E. Owen	Robert Bond	2:19.00
1886	Wild Rose †	Charles Butler	Charles Butler	David Watson Campbell	2:48.25
1885	Willie W.	William Jamieson	Erastus Burgess	Erastus Burgess	2:58.00
1884	Williams	A. Martin	A. Martin	John Halligan	2:50.75
1883	Roddy Pringle	Jacob Smith	Charles Boyle	Charles Boyle	2:52.50
1882	Fanny Wiser †	Allie Gates	W.E. Owen	Arthur Abingdon Stable	2:51.00
1881	Vice Chancellor	Mr. Brown	Erastus Burgess	John White	2:53.00
1880	Bonnie Bird †	Richard O'Leary	Erastus Burgess	John Forbes	2:47.00
1879	Moss Rose †	Allie Gates	Jonathan Scott	John White	2:54.50
1878	King George	Allie Gates	Richard O'Leary	Col. John Peters	2:49.50
1877	Amelia †	Charles Phair	Jonathan Scott	John White	2:56.50
1876	Norah P. †	Mr. Cook	Daniel Curtin	Col. John Peters	2:52.00
1875	Young Trumpeter	Unknown	Daniel Schoff	R. Ellison & C. Horton	2:52.50
1874	The Swallow †	John Hazard	William H. Hannon	Dr. Robert Thompson	2:51.75
1873	Mignonette †	Unknown	Jacob Smith	Roddy Pringle	2:57.00
1872	Fearnaught	Richard O'Leary	Richard O'Leary	Alex Simpson	2:54.50
1871	Floss †	James Lee	Robert T. Davies	Robert T. Davies	3:21.00
1870	John Bell	John Bennett	Charlie N. Gates	Charlie N. Gates	3:54.50
1869	Bay Jack	Abe Robinson Jr.	James Berry	Edward S. Bilton	3:50.00
1868	Nettie †	Archie Fisher	Jonathan Scott	James & John White	3:55.00
1867	Wild Rose †	Alex McLaughlin	Mr. Fagan	James & John White	1:50.50
1866	Beacon	Johnny Gagen	Johnny Gagen	Peter D. McKellar	1:54.00
1865	Lady Norfolk †	Unknown	John Sheppard	John Sheppard	Ukn
1864	Brunette †	Unknown	Dr. George D. Morton	Dr. George D. Morton	2:00.00
1863	Touchstone	William Small	James White	James & John White	1:59.00
1862	Palermo	Charles S. Littlefield	Charles Boyle	George C. Chalmers	2:03.00
1861	Wild Irishman	Ben Alcott	George Cameron	George Henderson	2:00.00
1860	Don Juan	Charles S. Littlefield	James White	James White	1:58.00

† indicates a filly

== Bibliography ==
- Cauz, Louis E. The Plate. (1984) Deneau Publishers ISBN 0-88879-104-6
