= Regal Embrace =

Canadian-bred Thoroughbred racehorse

- Sire: Vice Regent
- Grandsire: Northern Dancer
- Dam: Close Embrace
- Damsire: Nentego
- Sex: Stallion
- Foaled: 1975
- Country: Canada
- Colour: Bay
- Breeder: E. P. Taylor
- Owner: Windfields Farm
- Trainer: Macdonald Benson
- Earnings: Can$

Major wins
- Seagram Cup Handicap (1978) Canadian Classic Race wins: Queen's Plate (1978)

Regal Embrace (foaled 1975 in Ontario) was a Canadian Thoroughbred racehorse. Bred by E. P. Taylor and raced under the name of his Windfields Farm, he was out of the mare Close Embrace, a daughter of Nentego who was a son of Never Say Die, winner of the 1954 Epsom Derby and St. Leger Stakes. Regal Embrace was sired by Vice Regent, a Canadian Horse Racing Hall of Fame inductee and a son of Northern Dancer who is regarded as the 20th century’s best sire of sires.

Regal Embrace did not race as a two-year-old. At age three in 1978, he was conditioned for racing by future Canadian Horse Racing Hall of Fame trainer Mac Benson who had joined Windfields Farm that year. Ridden by another Hall of Fame inductee, Sandy Hawley, Regal Embrace defeated the great Overskate to win the 1978 Queen's Plate, Canada's most prestigious race and North America's oldest annually run stakes race. In winning, Regal Embrace equaled the stakes record set by Victoria Park in 1960. Standing at stud in 1979, Regal Embrace eventually stood at Blue Sky Farms in New York State. As a sire, he met with modest success.
