= Canadian Triple Crown of Thoroughbred Racing =

Thoroughbred horse races open to horses foaled in Canada

The Canadian Triple Crown (branded as the OLG Canadian Triple Crown for sponsorship reasons) is a series of three Thoroughbred horse races run annually in Ontario which is open to three-year-old horses foaled in Canada. Established in 1959, the series is unique in that it shares the same distances as its American counterpart but is contested on three different track surfaces.

The first leg, the King's Plate in August, is contested at 1¼ miles on Tapeta at Woodbine Racetrack in Toronto, Ontario, whereas the Prince of Wales Stakes in September is a 1³/16 mile event run on dirt at Fort Erie Race Track in Fort Erie, Ontario. The final leg is the 1½ mile Breeders' Stakes in October, which is run on turf over one full lap of the E. P. Taylor Turf Course at Woodbine.

The Canadian Triple Crown shares another characteristic with its American counterpart – all of the races in both series are open to geldings. This differs from the situation in Europe, where many important flat races, notably the British and all but one of the French classics, bar geldings.

Since 2024, all of the races in the Canadian Triple Crown have been televised by Sportsnet and Citytv, succeeding a prior agreement with TSN.

== Winners of the Triple Crown ==
Twelve horses are officially recognized as winning the Canadian Triple Crown:

Champions:

Champions (since 1959)
Year	Winner	Jockey King's Plate	Jockey Prince of Wales Stakes	Jockey Breeders' Stakes	Trainer	Owner
1932	Queensway	Frankie Mann	Frankie Mann	Frankie Mann	Harry Giddings, Jr.	Robert W. R. Cowie
1939	Archworth	Steven Denny Birley	Steven Denny Birley	Sterling Young	Mark Cowell	C. George McCullagh
1945	Uttermost	Robert B. Watson	Robert B. Watson	Robert B. Watson	Cecil Howard	Harry C. Hatch
1955	Ace Marine	George Walker	George Walker	George Walker	Yonnie Starr	Larkin Maloney
1956	Canadian Champ	David Stevenson	David Stevenson	Eugene Rodriguez	John Passero	William R. Beasley
1959	New Providence	Bobby Ussery	Avelino Gomez	Avelino Gomez	Pete McCann	Windfields Farm
1963	Canebora	Manuel Ycaza	Hugo Dittfach	Manuel Ycaza	Pete McCann	Windfields Farm
1989	With Approval	Don Seymour	Don Seymour	Don Seymour	Roger Attfield	Kinghaven Farms
1990	Izvestia	Don Seymour	Don Seymour	Don Seymour	Roger Attfield	Kinghaven Farms
1991	Dance Smartly	Pat Day	Pat Day	Pat Day	James E. Day	Sam-Son Farm
1993	Peteski	Craig Perret	Dave Penna	Craig Perret	Roger Attfield	Earle I. Mack
2003	Wando	Patrick Husbands	Patrick Husbands	Patrick Husbands	Mike Keogh	Gus Schickedanz

== Individual race winners ==
Key for full list of race winners
Denotes winners of the Canadian Triple Crown
Denotes winners of the King's Plate and the Prince of Wales Stakes but not the Breeders' Stakes
Denotes other winners of any other combination of 2 out of the 3 Canadian Triple Crown races

Canadian Triple Crown^{†}
Year	King's Plate	Prince of Wales Stakes	Breeders' Stakes
1860	Don Juan		
1861	Wild Irishman		
1862	Palermo		
1863	Touchstone		
1864	Brunette^{♥}		
1865	Lady Norfolk^{♥}		
1866	Beacon		
1867	Wild Rose^{♥}		
1868	Nettie^{♥}		
1869	Bay Jack		
1870	John Bell		
1871	Floss^{♥}		
1872	Fearnaught		
1873	Mignonette^{♥}		
1874	The Swallow^{♥}		
1875	Young Trumpeter		
1876	Norah P.^{♥}		
1877	Amelia^{♥}		
1878	King George		
1879	Moss Rose^{♥}		
1880	Bonnie Bird^{♥}		
1881	Vice Chancellor		
1882	Fanny Wiser^{♥}		
1883	Roddy Pringle		
1884	Williams		
1885	Willie W.		
1886	Wild Rose^{♥}		
1887	Bonnie Duke		
1888	Harry Cooper		
1889	Colonist		Helen Leigh^{♥}
1890	Kitestring^{♥}		Periwinkle
1891	Victorious		Victorious
1892	O'Donohue		Jardine
1893	Martello		Bonnie Dundee
1894	Joe Miller		Nancy Lee^{♥}
1895	Bonniefield		Bonniefield
1896	Millbrook		Melcha^{♥}
1897	Ferdinand		Wicker
1898	Bon Ino^{♥}		Wenlock
1899	Butter Scotch^{♥}		Butter Scotch^{♥}
1900	Dalmoor		The Provost
1901	John Ruskin		John Ruskin
1902	Lyddite^{♥}		Lyddite^{♥}
1903	Thessalon		Ayrshire Lad
1904	Sapper		War Whoop
1905	Inferno		Will King^{♥}
1906	Slaughter		Slaughter
1907	Kelvin		Sea Wall^{♥}
1908	Seismic		Seismic
1909	Shimonese^{♥}		Courtier
1910	Parmer		Parmer
1911	St. Bass		St. Bass
1912	Heresy		Amberite^{♥}
1913	Hearts of Oak		Hearts of Oak
1914	Beehive		Beehive
1915	Tartarean		Fair Montague
1916	Mandarin		Mandarin
1917	Belle Mahone^{♥}		Tarahera^{♥}
1918	Springside		no race
1919	Ladder of Light^{♥}		no race
1920	St. Paul		St. Paul
1921	Herendesy		Herendesy
1922	South Shore^{♥}		Paddle
1923	Flowerful		Trail Blazer
1924	Maternal Pride		Vrana^{♥}
1925	Fairbank^{♥}		Jean Crest^{♥}
1926	Haplite		Tattling^{♥}
1927	Troutlet^{♥}		Mr. Gaiety
1928	Young Kitty^{♥}		Young Kitty^{♥}
1929	Shorelint	Lion Hearted	Circulet
1930	Aymond	Spearhead	Whale Oil
1931	Froth Blower	no race	Froth Blower
1932	Queensway^{♥}	Queensway^{♥}	Queensway^{♥}
1933	King O'Connor	Syngo	Khaki John
1934	Horometer	no race	Horometer
1935	Sally Fuller^{♥}	no race	Gay Sympathy^{♥}
1936	Monsweep	Samoan	Samoan
1937	Goldlure	Cease Fire	Fore Isus^{♥}
1938	Bunty Lawless	no race	Mona Bell^{♥}
1939	Archworth	Archworth	Archworth
1940	Willie the Kid	Hood	Hood
1941	Budpath	no race	Attrisius^{♥}
1942	Ten to Ace	Ten to Ace	Shepperton
1943	Paolita^{♥}	no race	Tulachmore
1944	Acara	Ompalo	Broom Time
1945	Uttermost	Uttermost	Uttermost
1946	Kingarvie	no race	Windfields
1947	Moldy	Burboy	Canada's Teddy
1948	Last Mark	Lord Fairmond	Last Mark
1949	Epic	Victory Arch^{♥}	Grilled
1950	McGill	Nephisto	Nephisto
1951	Major Factor	Major Factor	Libertine
1952	Epigram	Acadian	Genthorn^{♥}
1953	Canadiana^{♥}	Chain Reaction	Chain Reaction
1954	Collisteo	Queen's Own	Queen's Own
1955	Ace Marine	Ace Marine	Ace Marine
1956	Canadian Champ	Canadian Champ	Canadian Champ
1957	Lyford Cay	Our Sirdar	The Schreiber
1958	Caledon Beau	White Apache	Dr. Em Jay
1959	New Providence	New Providence	New Providence
1960	Victoria Park	Bulpamiru^{♥}	Hidden Treasure
1961	Blue Light	Song of Even^{♥}	Song of Even^{♥}
1962	Flaming Page^{♥}	King Gorm	Crafty Lace
1963	Canebora	Canebora	Canebora
1964	Northern Dancer	Canadillis	Arctic Hills
1965	Whistling Sea	Good Old Mort	Good Old Mort
1966	Titled Hero	He's A Smoothie	Titled Hero
1967	Jammed Lovely^{♥}	Battling	Pine Point
1968	Merger	Rouletabille	No Parando
1969	Jumpin Joseph	Sharp-Eyed Quillo	Grey Whiz
1970	Almoner	Almoner	Mary of Scotland^{♥}
1971	Kennedy Road	New Pro Escar	Belle Geste^{♥}
1972	Victoria Song	Presidial	Nice Dancer
1973	Royal Chocolate	Tara Road	Come In Dad
1974	Amber Herod	Rushton's Corsair	Haymaker's Jig
1975	L'Enjoleur	L'Enjoleur	Momigi^{♥}
1976	Norcliffe	Norcliffe	Tiny Tinker
1977	Sound Reason	Dance in Time	Dance in Time
1978	Regal Embrace	Overskate	Overskate
1979	Steady Growth	Mass Rally	Bridle Path
1980	Driving Home	Allan Blue	Ben Fab
1981	Fiddle Dancer Boy	Cadet Corps	Social Wizard
1982	Son of Briartic	Runaway Groom	Runaway Groom
1983	Bompago	Archdeacon	Kingsbridge
1984	Key to the Moon	Val Dansant	Bounding Away^{♥}
1985	La Lorgnette^{♥}	Imperial Choice	Crowning Honors
1986	Golden Choice	Golden Choice	Carotene^{♥}
1987	Market Control	Coryphee	Hangin On A Star^{♥}
1988	Regal Intention	Regal Classic	King's Deputy
1989	With Approval	With Approval	With Approval
1990	Izvestia	Izvestia	Izvestia
1991	Dance Smartly^{♥}	Dance Smartly^{♥}	Dance Smartly^{♥}
1992	Alydeed	Benburb	Blitzer
1993	Peteski	Peteski	Peteski
1994	Basqueian	Bruce's Mill	Basqueian
1995	Regal Discovery	Kiridashi	Charlie's Dewan
1996	Victor Cooley	Stephanotis	Chief Bearhart
1997	Awesome Again	Cryptocloser	John The Magician
1998	Archers Bay	Archers Bay	Pinafore Park^{♥}
1999	Woodcarver	Gandria^{♥}	Free Vacation^{♥}
2000	Scatter the Gold	Scatter the Gold	Lodge Hill
2001	Dancethruthedawn^{♥}	Win City	Sweetest Thing^{♥}
2002	T J's Lucky Moon	Le Cinquieme Essai	Portcullis
2003	Wando	Wando	Wando
2004	Niigon	A Bit O'Gold	A Bit O'Gold
2005	Wild Desert	Ablo	Jambalaya
2006	Edenwold	Shillelagh Slew	Royal Challenger
2007	Mike Fox	Alezzandro	Marchfield
2008	Not Bourbon	Harlem Rocker	Marlang
2009	Eye of the Leopard	Gallant	Perfect Shower
2010	Big Red Mike	Golden Moka	Miami Deco
2011	Inglorious^{♥}	Pender Harbour	Pender Harbour
2012	Strait of Dover	Dixie Strike^{♥}	Irish Mission^{♥}
2013	Midnight Aria	Uncaptured	Up With the Birds
2014	Lexie Lou^{♥}	Coltimus Prime	Ami's Holiday
2015	Shaman Ghost	Breaking Lucky	Danish Dynaformer
2016	Sir Dudley Digges	Amis Gizmo	Camp Creek
2017	Holy Helena^{♥}	Cool Catomine	Channel Maker
2018	Wonder Gadot^{♥}	Wonder Gadot^{♥}	Neepawa
2019	One Bad Boy	Tone Broke	Tone Broke
2020	Mighty Heart	Mighty Heart	Belichick
2021	Safe Conduct	Haddassah	British Royalty
2022	Moira^{♥}	Duke of Love	Sir for Sure
2023	Paramount Prince	Velocitor	Touch'n Ride
2024	Caitlinhergrtness^{♥}	Vitality	Roscar
2025	Mansetti	Runaway Again	Tom's Magic
2026	Luster^{♥}	Military Time	Fire and Wine

Notes

- ^{†} The Canadian Triple Crown was officially established in 1959
- ^{♥} indicates filly

== Notes ==
In 2011, Luis Contreras became the first jockey to sweep the Triple Crown races with different horses. He won the then Queen's Plate on Inglorious and the next two races on Pender Harbour.

In 2020, trainer Josie Carroll won all three legs of the Canadian Triple Crown with Mighty Heart winning the then Queen's Plate and Prince of Wales Stakes and Belichick winning the Breeders' Stakes.

== See also ==
- Triple Crown of Thoroughbred Racing
- Triple Crown of Thoroughbred Racing (United States)
