= Scatter the Gold =

Canadian-bred Thoroughbred racehorse

- Sire: Mr. Prospector
- Grandsire: Raise a Native
- Dam: Dance Smartly
- Damsire: Danzig
- Sex: Stallion
- Foaled: 1997
- Country: Canada
- Colour: Dark Bay
- Breeder: Sam-Son Farm
- Owner: Sam-Son Farm
- Trainer: Mark Frostad
- Record: 7: 2-1-2
- Earnings: $845,854

Major wins
- Queen's Plate (2000); Prince of Wales Stakes (2000)
- Last updated on July 2, 2017

Scatter the Gold (foaled 26 February 1997) is a Canadian racehorse noted for winning two of the three races of the Canadian Triple Crown. He won the 2000 Queen's Plate and Prince of Wales Stakes, both with jockey Todd Kabel. He then finished third in the final leg, the Breeders' Stakes.

== Background and family ==
Scatter the Gold was bred in Canada by Sam-Son Farm. He was sired by the great Mr. Prospector, and out of the 1991 Canadian Triple Crown winning filly Dance Smartly. Alongside Scatter the Gold, Dance Smartly also produced 2001 Queen's Plate winner, filly Dancethruthedawn.

An article in The Globe and Mail on Dance Smartly's death described Scatter the Gold as "a big handsome colt with his mother's peel-me-a-grape attitude".

== Racing career ==
The Queen's Plate was Scatter the Gold's first win and fifth start. Because of his winless record and his lack of recent racing experience, the colt was not expected to be a serious contender. However, he won by 4-1/4 lengths after passing the frontrunners near the eighth post. In the Prince of Wales Stakes, he had such a poor start that his jockey feared he may have grabbed a quarter, and he was fourth of seven horses at the top of the final stretch. Nevertheless, he overtook all three leaders to win the race by a neck. Kabel later remarked, "He had me pretty worried. I didn't think we were going to get any part of it until down the backside he started to run hard".

Coming into the Breeders' Stake, Scatter the Gold was a favourite to win the Triple Crown. He did not exhibit his usual late burst of speed, and lost by three lengths to Lodge Hill and a neck behind Master Stuart. Lodge Hill had earlier finished sixth in the Queen's Plate.

== Retirement ==
After the Breeders' Stake, with total winnings of $845,854, Scatter the Gold was retired and sold to a Japanese breeder. Standing at Shizunai Stallion Station, he has since sired a number of racehorses.
