= Belle Mahone =

Canadian-bred Thoroughbred racehorse

- Sire: Ypsilanti
- Grandsire: Galore
- Dam: Irish Lass
- Damsire: Donovan
- Sex: Filly
- Foaled: 1914
- Country: Canada
- Colour: Bay
- Breeder: Joseph E. Seagram
- Owner: Joseph E. Seagram (Silks: black & yellow)
- Trainer: Barry T. Littlefield
- Earnings: Can$

Major wins
- Trenton Handicap (1919) Canadian Classic Race wins: King's Plate (1917)

Honours
- Belle Mahone Stakes at Woodbine Racetrack
- Last updated on February 27, 2010

Belle Mahone (foaled 1914 in Ontario) was a Canadian Thoroughbred racehorse best known for winning the 1917 King's Plate, Canada's most prestigious race and North America's oldest annually run stakes race.

Bred and raced by Canada's preeminent owner/breeder, distilling magnate Joseph E. Seagram, Belle Mahone was sired by Ypsilanti, an American grandson of the British runner Galopin, winner of the 1875 Epsom Derby and a three-time Leading sire in Great Britain and Ireland. Belle Mahone's dam was Irish Lass, imported from Great Britain by Joseph Seagram. She was a daughter of Donovan who in 1889 won two of the British Classic Races, The Derby and St. Leger Stakes.

On May 19, 1917, Belle Mahone won the 59th running of the King's Plate, equaling the stakes record for the mile and a quarter race. She was ridden by star American jockey Frank Robinson who travelled by train from Baltimore, Maryland to Buffalo, New York then by taxi to Toronto in order to keep his word to owner Joseph Seagram that he would ride the filly.

Belle Mahone was still racing at age five in 1919 when she won the Trenton Handicap at Havre de Grace Racetrack in Maryland.

The Belle Mahone Stakes at Woodbine Racetrack is named in her honor.

== Pedigree ==
Pedigree of Belle Mahone
Sire Ypsilanti 1898	Galore 1885	Galopin	Vedette
Sire Ypsilanti 1898	Galore 1885	Galopin	Flying Duchess
Sire Ypsilanti 1898	Galore 1885	Lady Maura	Macaroni
Sire Ypsilanti 1898	Galore 1885	Lady Maura	Noblesse
Sire Ypsilanti 1898	Stefanette 1884	Peter	Hermit
Sire Ypsilanti 1898	Stefanette 1884	Peter	Lady Masham
Sire Ypsilanti 1898	Stefanette 1884	Stellarius	Tynedale
Sire Ypsilanti 1898	Stefanette 1884	Stellarius	Stella
Dam Irish Lass 1898	Donovan 1886	Galopin	Vedette
Dam Irish Lass 1898	Donovan 1886	Galopin	Flying Duchess
Dam Irish Lass 1898	Donovan 1886	Mowerina	Scottish Chief
Dam Irish Lass 1898	Donovan 1886	Mowerina	Stockings
Dam Irish Lass 1898	Exning Lass 1885	Thurio	Cremorne
Dam Irish Lass 1898	Exning Lass 1885	Thurio	Verona
Dam Irish Lass 1898	Exning Lass 1885	Lady Sophie	King Tom
Dam Irish Lass 1898	Exning Lass 1885	Lady Sophie	Bridle
