= Jumpin Joseph =

Canadian-bred Thoroughbred racehorse

- Sire: Pago Pago
- Grandsire: Matrice
- Dam: Skinny Minny
- Damsire: Ponder
- Sex: Stallion
- Foaled: 1966
- Country: Canada
- Colour: Chestnut
- Breeder: William R. Beasley
- Owner: Warren Beasley
- Trainer: Robert S. Bateman
- Record: 21: 9-2-3
- Earnings: $127,216

Major wins
- Display Stakes (1968); Fleur de Lys Stakes (1968); Grey Handicap (1968); Achievement Handicap (1969); Queenston Stakes (1969); Toronto Cup Handicap (1969); Marine Stakes (1969) Canadian Classic Race wins: Queen's Plate (1969)

Awards
- Canadian Horse of the Year (1969)

Jumpin Joseph (foaled 1966 in Ontario) is a Canadian Thoroughbred Champion racehorse.

== Background ==
Jumpin Joseph was bred by William Beasley and raced by his son, Warren. Out of the stakes-winning mare, Skinny Minny, a daughter of the 1949 Kentucky Derby winner, Ponder, he was a son of Australian sire Pago Pago whose racing wins included the 1963 Golden Slipper Stakes.

Trained by Bobby Bateman,

== Racing career ==
As a two-year-old, Jumpin Joseph won stakes races at his home base at Woodbine Racetrack in Toronto, Ontario. At age three his wins included Canada's most prestigious race, the Queen's Plate and a track record equalling victory in the Achievement Handicap. The colt's 1969 performances earned him Canadian Horse of the Year honours.

== Stud record ==
Retired from racing, Jumpin Joseph stood at stud in Canada until being sent to breeders in Australia for the 1975 season. He met with limited success as a sire.
