= St. Bass =

Canadian-bred Thoroughbred racehorse

- Sire: Bassetlaw
- Grandsire: St. Simon
- Dam: Lady Betz
- Damsire: Hanover
- Sex: Stallion
- Foaled: 1908
- Country: Canada
- Colour: Bay
- Breeder: Cedar Grove Stud
- Owner: Harry Giddings
- Trainer: Harry Giddings, Jr.

Major wins
- Dominion Plate (1911) Canadian Classic Race wins: King's Plate (1911); Breeders' Stakes (1911)

St. Bass (foaled 1908 in Ontario) was a Canadian Thoroughbred racehorse. Bred by Harry Giddings at his Cedar Grove Stud in Oakville, Ontario, his sire, Bassetlaw, was a son of the outstanding runner and nine-time Leading sire in Great Britain & Ireland, St. Simon. His dam was Lady Betz, the daughter of Hanover, a U.S. Racing Hall of Fame inductee and a four-time Leading sire in North America.

As a weanling, St. Bass almost died of distemper. As a yearling, he severely injured himself when he caught a hoof between the rails of a fence and as a result was unable to race until age three.

St. Bass was entered in the May 20, 1911 King's Plate, the preeminent Canadian Classic. The colt was ridden by a nineteen-year-old American jockey, Eddie Dugan, who three days earlier at Pimlico Race Course in Baltimore, Maryland had won an American Classic, the Preakness Stakes. Raced at Woodbine Park Race Course in Toronto, Ontario, St. Bass won the King's Plate by six-lengths in a time of 2:08 4/5 for 1 1/4 miles, beating the existing record by an exceptional 1 3/5 seconds. St. Bass would be the first of four King's Plate winners for owner/breeder Harry Giddings and the first of a record eight wins as a trainer for his son, Harry Jr.

Three days after winning the King's Plate, St. Bass and jockey Dugan won the Breeders' Stakes and on June 21, the colt won the Dominion Plate at the Hamilton, Ontario racetrack. While he would win other races in 1911, an injury forced St. Bass to retire that year.

St. Bass was not successful as a sire.
