= Epigram (horse) =

Canadian-bred Thoroughbred racehorse

- Sire: Flares
- Grandsire: Gallant Fox
- Dam: Hasty Bet
- Damsire: Reigh Count
- Sex: Stallion
- Foaled: 1949
- Country: Canada
- Colour: Bay
- Breeder: E. P. Taylor
- Owner: Three Vs Stable
- Trainer: 1) Gordon J. McCann; 2) Stanley V. Bowden
- Record: 25: 3-6-4
- Earnings: Can$24,062

Major wins
- William Hendrie Memorial Handicap (1952) Canadian Classic Race wins: Queen's Plate (1952)
- Last updated on April 4, 2010

Epigram (foaled 1949 in Ontario) was a Canadian Thoroughbred racehorse best known for winning the 1952 Queen's Plate, Canada's most prestigious race and North America's oldest annually run stakes race.

Bred and raced by E. P. Taylor, his dam was Hasty Bet, a daughter of Reigh Count, the 1928 Kentucky Derby winner and a U.S. Racing Hall of Fame inductee. Epigram was a son of the American-bred winner of the 1938 Ascot Gold Cup, Flares, who in turn was a son of Gallant Fox, the 1930 U.S. Triple Crown winner and a U.S. Racing Hall of Fame inductee.

In a rare mistake by the E. P. Taylor racing team, Epigram was entered in a September 1951 claiming race and was taken for $2,500 by Three Vs Stable, owned by the Veal brothers, Frank, Lawrence and Gordon, proprietors of a Studebaker dealership in Toronto.

Epigram entered the 1952 Queen's Plate having never won a race and having only earned $75. At the time when the distance was set at one and an eighth miles, in a twenty-one-horse field Epigram won the Queen's Plate by defeating E. P. Taylor's horse Dress Circle and Acadian who came into the race having won divisions of the Plate Trial Stakes.
