= Basqueian =

Canadian-bred Thoroughbred racehorse

- Sire: Bounding Basque
- Grandsire: Grey Dawn
- Dam: Valse Musette
- Damsire: Halo
- Sex: Gelding
- Foaled: 1991
- Country: Canada
- Colour: Bay
- Breeder: Frank Stronach
- Owner: Frank Stronach
- Trainer: 1) Daniel J. Vella; 2) Joe Orseno (1997)
- Record: Won 8 stakes races
- Earnings: $1,094,767

Major wins
- Durham Cup Handicap (1994, 1995, 1996); Red Bank Handicap (1997); Longfellow Stakes (1997) Canadian Classic Race wins: Queen's Plate (1994); Breeders' Stakes (1994)

Awards
- Canadian Champion Older Male Horse (1995)

Basqueian (foaled 1991) is a Canadian Thoroughbred racehorse best known for winning two of the 1994 Canadian Triple Crown races.

Basqueian was bred and raced by prominent businessman and major stable owner Frank Stronach. Racing at age three in 1994, at Toronto's Woodbine Racetrack Basqueian finished second by less than a nose to Bruce's Mill in the 1994 Plate Trial Stakes. The two horses then reversed their positions in Canada's most prestigious race, the Queen's Plate. The win was the first in the Queen's Plate for trainer Dan Vella and the second for jockey Jack Lauzon. The two horses again ran one-two in the second leg of the Canadian Triple Crown, the Prince of Wales Stakes, and this time Bruce's Mill came out on top. In the final leg of the series, Basqueian won on turf in the Breeders' Stakes. That same year, he won the first of three straight editions of the Durham Cup.

Basqueian went on to race in both Canada and the United States. In 1995, he won his second Durham Cup and at the Hawthorne Race Course near Chicago, Illinois, ran second in the Hawthorne Gold Cup. His performances that year earned him the 1995 Sovereign Award for Champion Older Male Horse. In 1997 at Monmouth Park in Oceanport, New Jersey, Basqueian won the Red Bank Handicap and Longfellow Stakes

Retired from racing with earnings in excess of $1 million, Basqueian, a gelding, now serves as a pony horse used to calm the young colts and fillies undergoing race training at owner Frank Stronach's Adena Springs South in Williston, Florida.
