= Uttermost =

Canadian-bred Thoroughbred racehorse

- Sire: Soleil Du Midi
- Grandsire: Teddy
- Dam: Uppermost
- Damsire: Cohort
- Sex: Stallion
- Foaled: 1942
- Country: Canada
- Colour: Bay
- Breeder: Harry C. Hatch
- Owner: Harry C. Hatch
- Trainer: Cecil Howard
- Record: 34: 14-5-1
- Earnings: $45,830

Major wins
- Clarendon Stakes (1944); Mrs. Orpen's Cup and Saucer Handicap (1944); Winnipeg Futurity (1944); Coronation Futurity (1944); Plate Trial Stakes (1945) Canadian Classic Race wins: King's Plate (1945); Prince of Wales Stakes (1945); Breeders' Stakes (1945)

Awards
- 3rd Canadian Triple Crown Champion (1945)

Uttermost (foaled 1942 in Ontario) was a Canadian Thoroughbred racehorse who in 1945 won the three races that later formed the official Canadian Triple Crown series.

Bred and raced by liquor magnate Harry C. Hatch, Uttermost was trained by Cecil Howard and ridden by future Canadian Horse Racing Hall of Fame jockey Bobby Watson.

He was the top two-year-old in Canada and was the country's top horse in 1945 at age three.
