= Regal Discovery =

Canadian-bred Thoroughbred racehorse

- Sire: Regal Classic
- Grandsire: Vice Regent
- Dam: Royal Discovery
- Damsire: Tom Tulle
- Sex: Stallion
- Foaled: 1992
- Country: Canada
- Colour: Bay
- Breeder: C. Gordon Scott
- Owner: No. 1 Stable
- Trainer: Roger Attfield
- Record: 9: 5-3-1
- Earnings: $652,845

Major wins
- Canadian Classic Race wins: Queen's Plate (1995)
- Last updated on January 25, 2010

Regal Discovery (July 2, 1992 - January 6, 2008) was a Canadian Thoroughbred racehorse best known for winning the 1995 Queen's Plate, Canada's most prestigious race and North America's oldest annually run stakes race.

== Background ==
Bred by Dr. Gordon Scott, Regal Discovery was sired by Regal Classic, the 1987 Canadian Champion Two-Year-Old-Colt and a grandson of the legendary Northern Dancer. He was out of the mare Royal Discovery, a daughter of multiple stakes winner Tom Tulle who was a son of the 1965 American Champion Three-Year-Old Male Horse, Tom Rolfe.

Regal Discovery was purchased for US$21,000 at the 1993 Keeneland Yearling Sale by Ron and Anne Shaddock, their daughter Lesley Anne Shaddock-McLean, and her husband, National Hockey League goaltender, Kirk McLean. They raced under the nom de course No. 1 Stable, a name based on Kirk McLean's sweater number with his Vancouver Canucks.

== Racing career ==
Trained by Canadian Horse Racing Hall of Fame inductee, Roger Attfield, Regal Discovery began racing from a base at Woodbine Racetrack in Toronto. His best stakes race result at age two was a third-place finish to winner Talkin Man in the Coronation Futurity Stakes. At age three he had his best year, being the upset winner at odds of 9:1 in the Queen's Plate. Following that, Regal Discovery earned seconds in both the 1995 Prince of Wales Stakes to Kiridashi, and to Peaks and Valleys in the Grade 1 Molson Export Million.

At age four in 1996, Regal Discovery raced with limited success in Canada and the United States as well as in the March 27, 1996 Dubai Duty Free Stakes at Nad Al Sheba Racecourse in Dubai in which he finished out of the money. Regal Discovery continued to race in Canada and the United States with limited success through age five.

== Stud record ==
In 1997 Regal Discovery was then retired to stud duty where he met with modest results.

Regal Discovery died at age fifteen on January 6, 2008.
