= Harry Giddings Jr. =

Canadian horse breeder and trainer

Harry Giddings, Jr.
Personal information
- Born: May 18, 1884 Trafalgar Township, Ontario, Canada
- Died: June 15, 1949 (aged 65) Toronto, Ontario
- Resting place: St. Jude's Cemetery, Oakville, Ontario
- Occupation: Trainer/Owner/Breeder

Horse racing career
- Sport: Horse racing

Major racing wins
- Coronation Futurity Stakes (1911, 1912, 1913, 1915, 1920, 1933, 1936); King Edward Stakes (1930, 1938); Victoria Stakes (1934); Durham Cup Stakes (1913, 1940) Canadian Classics wins: Queen's Plate (1911, 1913, 1914, 1920, 1931, 1932, 1934, 1942); Prince of Wales Stakes (1932, 1942, 1948); Breeders' Stakes (1911, 1913, 1914, 1920, 1931, 1932, 1934)

Honours
- Canadian Horse Racing Hall of Fame (1985)

Significant horses
- Beehive, Froth Blower, Hearts of Oak, Horometer, Queensway, St. Bass, St. Paul, Ten to Ace

Harry Giddings Jr. (May 18, 1884 – June 15, 1949) was a Canadian Horse Racing Hall of Fame owner, breeder, and trainer of thoroughbred racehorses. He was born in Trafalgar Township in Halton County, Ontario now at the outskirts of the town of Oakville. Raised on a horse breeding farm, he learned about training Thoroughbreds from childhood and by 1907 was successful enough to have one of his horses compete in the Queen's Plate, Canada's most prestigious horse race first run in 1860. Between 1911 and 1942, Harry Giddings would win a record eight editions of the Queen's Plate. Sixty-six years later in 2008 Roger Attfield tied the record. In addition to his Queen's Plates, Giddings Jr. won ten of the two other Canadian Classic Races which today constitute the Canadian Triple Crown series.

Harry Giddings Jr. maintained a stud farm near Oakville, and owned four of his eight Queen's Plate winners. He trained horses for other owners and was active in the business until his death in 1949.
