= John White (sportsman) =

English sportsman

John William White (1 August 1877 – 2 December 1958) was an English sportsman who played first-class cricketer for Nottinghamshire between 1902 and 1904 as well as playing football for Nottingham Forest. He was born in New Annesley; died in Mansfield.

== Cricket ==
White made three first class appearances for Nottinghamshire as a wicket-keeper between 1902 and 1904 before a single match for Scotland against the touring West Indies in 1906.

== Football ==
John White
Personal information
- Full name: John William White
- Date of birth: 1 August 1877
- Place of birth: Annesley, England
- Date of death: 2 December 1958 (aged 81)
- Position: Full back

Senior career*
Years	Team	Apps	(Gls)
1901–1903	Nottingham Forest	24	(0)
1903	New Brompton		
Total		24	(0)
- * Club domestic league appearances and goals

White was an English footballer who played in the Football League for Nottingham Forest.
