= Sterling Young =

American basketball player (born 2003)

Personal information
- Listed height: 6 ft 1 in (1.85 m)
- Listed weight: 175 lb (79 kg)

Career information
- High school: Miami Prep (Miami, Florida)
- College: Pratt CC (2021–2023); Charlotte (2023–2024); Florida A&M (2024–2025); Indiana State (2025–2026)
- NBA draft: 2026: undrafted
- Position: Point guard

Career highlights
- SWAC Player of the Year (2025); First-team All-SWAC (2025)

Sterling Young is an American basketball player. He played college basketball for the Pratt Community College Beavers, Charlotte 49ers, Florida A&M Rattlers and Indiana State Sycamores.

== High school career ==
Young is a native of Queens, New York. He attended Miami Prep, helping the Cyclones to a 39-2 record and a state Championship under coach Art Alvarez. Young was also one of the nation's leading scorers for his class.

== College career ==
Young began his collegiate career at Pratt Community College, playing two seasons for the team. As a sophomore, he averaged 15.9 points, 3.1 assists, 3.0 rebounds, and 1.2 steals per game. Young played in five games at Charlotte as a junior. He transferred to Florida A&M. Young averaged 17 points, two rebounds, and 1.7 assists per game as a senior. He was named SWAC Player of the Year. Following the season he transferred to Indiana State, taking advantage of an additional year of eligibility.
