= Parmer =

Parmer is a surname. Notable people with the name include:

- Hugh Parmer (1939–2020), American attorney, university professor, humanitarian executive, Democratic politician
- Jayant Parmer (born 1954), Indian Urdu language poet
- Jeff Parmer (born 1985), American professional basketball player
- Jim Parmer (1927–2005), American professional football running back
- Marlon Parmer (born 1980), American professional basketball player
- Martin Parmer (1778–1850), eccentric American frontiersman, statesman, politician and soldier

== See also ==
- Cole-Parmer, Company now known as Antylia Scientific
- Parmer County, Texas, U.S.
