= Steady Growth =

Canadian Thoroughbred racehorse

- Sire: Briartic
- Grandsire: Nearctic
- Dam: Crelita
- Damsire: Crepello
- Sex: Stallion
- Foaled: April 4, 1976
- Country: Canada
- Colour: Chestnut
- Breeder: Kinghaven Farms
- Owner: Kinghaven Farms
- Trainer: John J. Tammaro, Jr.
- Record: 14: 5-3-2
- Earnings: Can$235,901

Major wins
- Plate Trial Stakes (1979); Arlington Classic (1979) Canadian Classic Race wins: Queen's Plate (1979)

Awards
- Canadian Champion 3-Year-Old Male Horse (1979)

Honours
- Steady Growth Stakes at Woodbine Racetrack

Steady Growth (April 4, 1976 – September 20, 1995) was a Canadian Thoroughbred Champion racehorse.

== Background ==
Bred and raced by Bud Willmot's Kinghaven Farms, Steady Growth was out of the mare Crelita, a daughter of Crepello, winner of the 1957 Epsom Derby and 2,000 Guineas Stakes and the Leading sire in Great Britain and Ireland in 1969 and the Leading broodmare sire in Great Britain & Ireland in 1974. Steady Growth's sire was Briartic, who also sired the 1982 Queen's Plate winner, Son of Briartic.

Steady Growth was conditioned for racing from a base at Woodbine Racetrack in Toronto, Ontario, Canada, by American trainer John Tammaro, Jr.

== Racing career ==
At age three, the colt won the 1979 Plate Trial Stakes and then Canada's most prestigious race, the Queen's Plate. A month later, he was shipped to Chicago's Arlington Park, where he defeated favorite Private Account in July's Arlington Classic. In August, Steady Growth was sent to New Jersey's Monmouth Park Racetrack to compete in the Monmouth Invitational Handicap, in which he finished second to Belmont Stakes winner Coastal. A subsequent leg injury ended Steady Growth's racing career.

== Stud career ==
He was retired to his owner's stud farm, where he sired thirteen stakes race winners. The best of his progeny was millionaire and 1989 Canadian Champion Older Horse Steady Power, a versatile runner at short and long distances whose wins included the Canadian and Manitoba Derbies, and the mile and three quarter Valedictory Handicap.

Steady Growth died of a heart attack on September 20, 1995, at Kinghaven Farms.

== Pedigree ==
Pedigree of Steady Growth
Sire Briartic	Nearctic	Nearco	Pharos
Sire Briartic	Nearctic	Nearco	Nogara
Sire Briartic	Nearctic	Lady Angela	Hyperion
Sire Briartic	Nearctic	Lady Angela	Sister Sarah
Sire Briartic	Sweet Lady Briar	Round Table	Princequillo
Sire Briartic	Sweet Lady Briar	Round Table	Knight's Daughter
Sire Briartic	Sweet Lady Briar	Parading Lady	Bernborough
Sire Briartic	Sweet Lady Briar	Parading Lady	Polly Briar
Dam Crelita	Crepello	Donatello II	Blenheim
Dam Crelita	Crepello	Donatello II	Delleana
Dam Crelita	Crepello	Crepuscule	Mieuxce
Dam Crelita	Crepello	Crepuscule	Red Sunset
Dam Crelita	Carmelita	Charlottesville	Prince Chevalier
Dam Crelita	Carmelita	Charlottesville	Noorani
Dam Crelita	Carmelita	Avila	Hyperion
Dam Crelita	Carmelita	Avila	Ste. Therese
