= Shady Well Stakes =

Horse race

- Class: Restricted
- Location: Woodbine Racetrack; Toronto, Ontario
- Inaugurated: 1956
- Race type: Thoroughbred - Flat racing
- Website: www.woodbineentertainment.com/qct/default.asp

Race information
- Distance: 6 furlong sprint
- Surface: Polytrack
- Track: left-handed
- Qualification: Two-year-old fillies (foaled in Ontario)
- Weight: Allowances
- Purse: $150,000 (2025)

The Shady Well Stakes is a Thoroughbred horse race run annually since 2000 at Woodbine Racetrack in Toronto, Ontario, Canada. Held in November 2025, the ungraded stakes race is open to two-year-old fillies foaled in the Province of Ontario. A sprint race, it is contested over a distance of 6 furlongs on Polytrack synthetic dirt, it currently offers a purse of $150,000. It was raced in two divisions in 1958 and 1968.

Inaugurated in 1956, the race is named in honour of Edward F. Seagram's filly, Shady Well, whose career wins included three straight Durham Cup Handicaps during 1932-1934.

Since inception, the race has been contested at a variety of distances:

- 5 1/2 furlongs : 1980-2005, 2007 to present (at Woodbine Racetrack)
- 5 furlongs : 2006 (at Woodbine Racetrack)
- 6 furlongs : 1974-1979 (at Woodbine Racetrack)
- 6 1/2 furlongs : 1956-1959, (at Woodbine Racetrack), 1969-1972 (at Fort Erie Racetrack), 1973 (at Woodbine Racetrack)
- 7 furlongs : 1960-1967 (at Woodbine Racetrack), 1968 (at Greenwood Raceway)

== Records ==
Speed record:

- 1:03.14 - Roxy Gap (2010)

Most wins by an owner:

- 6 - Kinghaven Farms (1974, 1980, 1982, 1983, 1984, 2000)

Most wins by a jockey:

- 4 - Avelino Gomez (1966, 1972, 1976, 1978)
- 4 - David Clark (1981, 1989, 1998, 2005)
- 4 - Robert Landry (1994, 1996, 1999, 2002)

Most wins by a trainer:

- 4 - Frank H. Merrill, Jr. (1958, 1965, 1972, 1976)
- 4 - John Tammaro, Jr. (1980, 1982, 1983, 1984)

== Winners of the Shady Well Stakes ==
Year	Winner	Jockey	Trainer	Owner	Time
2015	Caren	Jesse M. Campbell	Michael P. De Paulo	Robert Marzilli	1:04.33
2014	Starless Night	Eurico Rosa Da Silva	Nicholas Gonzalez	Tucci Stables	1:04.67
2013	On Rainbow Bridge	Skye Chernetz	David Cotey	Triple K Stables	1:04.38
2012	Cryptic Message	Emma-Jayne Wilson	Mark Casse	C.E.C. Farms	1:04.42
2011	Judy the Beauty	Jeffrey Sanchez	Wesley A. Ward	Wesley A. Ward	1:03.95
2010	Roxy Gap	Corey Fraser	Mark Casse	Melnyk Racing Stables	1:03.14
2009	Maritime Passion	Chantal Sutherland	Mike DePaulo	Benjamin Hutzel	1:04.24
2008	Cawaja Beach	Daniel David	Scott Fairlie	Hard Eight Sta./Ace Racing	1:04.26
2007	Alvena	Patrick Husbands	Josie Carroll	James & Alice Sapara	1:04.09
2006	Midnight Shadow	Ray Sabourin	Robert P. Tiller	Frank DiGiulio, Jr. et al.	0:57.65
2005	Wannatalkaboutme	David Clark	Nicholas Gonzalez	M. Gonzalez/MAD Racing	1:05.52
2004	South Bay Cove	Todd Kabel	Roger Attfield	Windhaven	1:06.26
2003	Megan's Appeal	Simon Husbands	Kevin Attard	Fire Rock Stable	1:05.73
2002	Appleby Gardens	Robert Landry	Todd A. Pletcher	Eugene Melnyk	1:05.93
2001	Ginger Gold	Richard Dos Ramos	Sid C. Attard	Jim Dandy Stable	1:07.11
2000	Small Promises	Neil Poznansky	Roger Attfield	Kinghaven Farms/Attfield	1:05.85
1999	Ruby Park	Robert Landry	Todd A. Pletcher	E.& L. Melnyk	1:06.40
1998	Last Vice	David Clark	Phil Gracey	O'Cainon Stables	1:05.80
1997	Queen St. West	Mickey Walls	Joe Walls	Shelter Valley/C. Walls	1:05.80
1996	Larkwhistle	Robert Landry	Roger Attfield	Anderson/Cuddy/Ferguson	1:06.00
1995	Heavenly Valley	Sandy Hawley	Daniel J. Vella	Frank Stronach	1:05.20
1994	Honky Tonk Tune	Robert Landry	Daniel J. Vella	Frank Stronach	1:04.20
1993	Lucky Pisces	Mark Larsen	Emile M. Allain	Eastview Stables	1:06.20
1992	Sermon Time	Ricky Griffith	Kathy Patton-Casse	Bruno Schickedanz	1:04.40
1991	Maple Lake	Robert King, Jr.	Glenn Magnusson	Gary Vasey & partner	1:06.60
1990	Run Lady Run	Don Seymour	Conrad A. Belaire	Cooksmere Farm	1:05.60
1989	Bodust	David Clark	Gordon M. Huntley	High Point Stable	1:04.00
1988	Blondeinamotel	Sandy Hawley	Michael J. Doyle	Windhaven Farms	1:05.80
1987	Phoenix Factor	Irwin Driedger	Emile M. Allain	A. J. Anderson	1:05.20
1986	Casereae	Robin Platts	Michael J. Doyle	Eaton Hall Farm	1:05.80
1985	Simply Splashing	Dan Beckon	Gerry Belanger	J. N. Stable	1:06.00
1984	Festival Star	Jack Lauzon	John Tammaro, Jr.	Kinghaven Farms	1:05.00
1983	Summer Mood	Robin Platts	John Tammaro, Jr.	Kinghaven Farms	1:05.80
1982	Candle Bright	Eric Beitia	John Tammaro, Jr.	Kinghaven Farms	1:06.20
1981	Ada Lady	David Clark	Gordon M. Huntley	Young / Schipper	1:04.20
1980	Passing Mood	Brian Swatuk	John Tammaro, Jr.	Kinghaven Farms	1:05.20
1979	Avenare	J. Paul Souter	Michael J. Doyle	Bo-Teek Farm	1:11.40
1978	Spin To Win *	Avelino Gomez	George M. Carter	E. C. Pasquale	1:11.80
1977	L'Alezane	J. Paul Souter	Yonnie Starr	Jean-Louis Levesque	1:12.20
1976	Olympic Princess	Avelino Gomez	Frank H. Merrill, Jr.	Beverly Bronfman	1:13.00
1975	Seraphic	Jeffrey Fell	Yonnie Starr	Jean-Louis Levesque	1:10.80
1974	Deepstar	James Kelly	Andrew G. Smithers	Kinghaven Farms	1:11.60
1973	Trudie Tudor	William McMahon	John Morahan	Doug Banks	1:16.60
1972	Square Angel	Avelino Gomez	Frank H. Merrill, Jr.	W. Preston Gilbride	1:18.20
1971	Hempens Soung	Phil I. Grimm	Doug M. Davis, Jr.	Holtsinger / Davis	1:18.00
1970	Vacation Lady	John LeBlanc	R. Wright	R. E. Leslie	1:18.40
1969	Foxy Parent	Chris Rogers	W. F. Edmiston	W. F. Edmiston	1:18.00
1968	Amber Sherry	Richard Grubb	Gil Rowntee	Stafford Farms	1:27.40
1968	Windsor Maid	Robin Platts	Lou Cavalaris, Jr.	Gardiner/Golden West	1:27.20
1967	Rhythm Sal	Noel Turcotte	J. Brown	I. Tenney	1:24.80
1966	All We Have	Avelino Gomez	Warren Beasley	William R. Beasley	1:24.40
1965	Brave Front	M. N. Gonzalez	Frank H. Merrill, Jr.	H. M. Hughes	1:24.40
1964	Northern Queen	Hugo Dittfach	Tom Fleming	Windfields Farm	1:23.40
1963	Ciboulette	Keith Robinson	Don J. Campbell	Jean-Louis Levesque	1:24.60
1962	My Bunty	Keith Robinson	Carl F. Chapman	Larkin Maloney	1:24.60
1961	Flaming Page	John R. Adams	Horatio Luro	Windfields Farm	1:27.60
1960	Flashing Top	James Fitzsimmons	Gordon J. McCann	Windfields Farm	1:25.80
1959	Naughty Flirt	Ernie Warme	Edward Mann	Gardiner/Bell	1:19.20
1958	Sword Woman	Don Hale	A. H. Routcliffe	Pine Tree Stable	1:20.00
1958	Royal Border	Armand Viola	Frank H. Merrill, Jr.	Gormley Stud Farm	1:20.00
1957	Stole The Ring	C. O'Brien	E. Hall	Miss C. B. Armstrong	1:17.60
1956	Pink Velvet	E. A. Rodriguez	John Passero	William R. Beasley	1:18.00

* In 1978 Susie Bigger finished first but was disqualified and set back to second.
