= Paul J. Bailey =

American jockey

Paul Bailey
Personal information
- Born: April 5, 1922 Kentucky
- Died: October 18, 2001 (aged 79) Florida
- Occupation: Jockey

Horse racing career
- Sport: Horse racing
- Career wins: 1,788

Major racing wins
- Alberta Derby (1945); Winnipeg Futurity (1946); Western Canada Handicap (1947); Canadian Derby (1947, 1948); Longacres Derby (1948); King Edward Gold Cup (1949); Hyde Park Stakes (1951); Washington Futurity (1951); Stars and Stripes Handicap (1952); Louisiana Derby (1953); Michigan Mile Handicap (1954); New Orleans Handicap (1954); Lawrence Realization Stakes (1955); Roseben Handicap (1955); Sanford Stakes (1955); Travers Stakes (1955); Troy Purse (1955); Carter Handicap (1956); Merchants and Citizens Handicap (1956); Saranac Stakes (1956, 1959); Stymie Handicap (1956); Belmont Futurity Stakes (1957); Gardenia Stakes (1958); Jamaica Handicap (1958); Delaware Handicap (1959); Mother Goose Stakes (1959); Test Stakes (1959); Dwyer Stakes (1960); Ladies Handicap (1961); Nettie Handicap (1964)

Significant horses
- Quill, Reneged, Round Table, Sir Berrill, Thinking Cap

Paul J. Bailey (April 5, 1922 – October 18, 2001) was an American jockey in Thoroughbred racing who, on June 26, 1959, set a New York Racing Association record with five wins from five mounts on a single racecard at Belmont Park in Elmont, New York. It would be another 21 years before anyone matched that feat when both Jeffrey Fell and Jorge Velásquez did it during the month of June in 1980.

== Early success in Western Canada ==
Paul Bailey began his professional riding career 1944 when he got his first win at a track in Oregon. He got his first win on a track in Oregon. For a few years during the latter part of the 1940s, he rode on the fall circuit n Western Canada. Such was his success that after winning 18 of 36 starts with four seconds and five third-place finishes, a Winnipeg Tribune newspaper story referring to his "phenomenal" performance said that "at Polo Park he acts as though the fall meets were staged for his special benefit."

At that same track, Paul Bailey won back-to-back editions of the Canadian Derby, taking the 1947 race aboard Sir Berrill and in what Assiniboia Downs racing historian Bob Gates called "one of the greatest horse races ever run in Manitoba", Bailey won his second Canadian Derby in 1948 aboard the filly Victory Gift for owner Scotty Kennedy and trainer Bert Blake.

Bailey's success in Western Canada opened the door to the big tracks on the East Coast of the United States. Of his three mounts in the Kentucky Derby, his best result came in the 1951 edition when he rode Royal Mustang to a strong second place, finishing a head back of winner, Count Turf.

Paul Bailey retired from racing in 1968. He died at his Florida home on October 18, 2001, as the result of a brain tumor.
