= Steady Power =

Canadian-bred Thoroughbred racehorse

- Sire: Steady Growth
- Grandsire: Briartic
- Dam: Pyramid Power
- Damsire: Upper Nile
- Sex: Gelding
- Foaled: 1984
- Country: Canada
- Colour: Chestnut
- Breeder: Kinghaven Farms
- Owner: Kinghaven Farms
- Trainer: Roger Attfield
- Record: 70: 13-19-9
- Earnings: Can$1,132,196

Major wins
- Achievement Handicap (1987); Alberta Derby (1987); Canadian Derby (1987); Manitoba Derby (1987); Speed to Spare Championship Stakes (1988); Valedictory Handicap (1988); Jockey Club Cup Handicap (1989); Durham Cup Handicap (1989)

Awards
- Canadian Champion Older Horse (1989)

Steady Power (foaled 1984 in Ontario) is a Canadian Thoroughbred racehorse. Bred and raced by Kinghaven Farms, Steady Power was a versatile runner at both short and long distances whose wins included the seven-furlong Achievement Handicap, and the mile and three quarter (14 furlongs) Valedictory Handicap.

In 1989, five-year-old Steady Power enjoyed his best year, earning Canadian Champion Older Horse honours after winning the Durham Cup Handicap, the Jockey Club Cup Handicap, and a second by a head to Hodges Bay in the 1989 Rothmans International.

A gelding, Steady Power continued to race competitively at the top levels in Canadian racing into age eight when he was claimed for $50,000 in June 1992. By October he had been dropped to a $16,000 claiming race when Kinghaven Farms bought him back and gave him the retirement he deserved.
