= Western Canadian Triple Crown =

New Horse Racing Stakes

The Western Canadian Triple Crown was established in 2023, and consists of three races across three Canadian tracks. It consists of the Manitoba Derby, the Canadian Derby, and the British Columbia Derby. Announced on May 9, 2023, the Western Canadian Triple Crown adds a bonus incentive of $100,000 CAD to any horse who can win all three races.

The first iteration of the Western Canadian Triple Crown started with the Manitoba Derby on August 7, 2023 at Assiniboia Downs in Winnipeg, Manitoba, where Mano Dura was the winner. The second leg, the Canadian Derby, was won by Abeliefinthislivin at Century Mile Racetrack and Casino in Edmonton, Alberta, and Accidental Hero won the third leg at Hastings Racecourse in the British Columbia Derby in Vancouver, British Columbia.

== Race Information ==
Western Canadian Triple Crown Races
	Manitoba Derby	Canadian Derby	British Columbia Derby
Date	August 7, 2023	August 26, 2023	September 16, 2023
Current Track	Assiniboia Downs	Century Mile Racetrack and Casino	Hastings Racecourse
Location	Winnipeg, Manitoba	Edmonton, Alberta	Vancouver, British Columbia
Distance	1 1/8 miles (9.0 furlongs; 1,800 m)	1 1/4 miles (10 furlongs; 2,000 m)	1 1/8 miles (9.0 furlongs; 1,800 m)
Background	The first “Derby” was run in 1930, although from 1930 to 1933 it was known as the Manitoba Stakes. In 1934 the name of the race was officially changed to the Manitoba Derby. In 1936 the Derby was opened to all horses bred in Canada. The race was run annually at old Polo Park race track with the exception of 1937 when it was run at Whittier Park in St. Boniface. In 1941 the Manitoba Derby was changed to the Canadian Derby. The new Canadian Derby was run at Polo Park until it closed in 1956 and the race was relocated to Edmonton. In 1960, the Manitoba Derby was resurrected.	In 1941 the Manitoba Derby was changed to the Canadian Derby. In 1956, Polo Park Racetrack was closed and the race was moved to Northlands Park in Edmonton, Alberta. In 2019, the race moved to its present location at the Century Mile Racetrack and Casino south of Edmonton. The Canadian Derby was contested at 1 mile from 1930 to 1933, 1 1/4 miles (10 furlongs; 2,000 m) from 1934 to 1956, and 1 3/8 miles (11 furlongs; 2,200 m) miles from 1957 until 2018. The race returned to 1 1/4 miles in 2019 when it was moved to Century Mile Racetrack.	Prior to 1961 (with the exception of 1949 and 1956), the BC Derby was run at Lansdowne Park Racetrack in Richmond, British Columbia. The BC Derby was not run in 2020 or 2021 owing to factors relating to the Covid 19 pandemic.
Purse	$125,000 CAD (2023)	$200,000 CAD (2023)	$125,000 CAD (2023)

== Individual race winners ==
Full list of race winners
Year	Manitoba Derby	Canadian Derby	British Columbia Derby
2026	Western Warrior	Quarry	N/A (Discontinued)
2025	Attack	Take Charge Tom	Rondelito
2024	Bricklayer	August Rain	August Rain
2023	Mano Dura	Abeliefinthislivin	Accidental Hero
