= Princess Elizabeth Stakes (Canada) =

- Class: Restricted
- Location: Woodbine Racetrack; Toronto, Ontario, Canada
- Inaugurated: 1946
- Race type: Thoroughbred – Flat racing
- Website: www.woodbineentertainment.com/qct/default.asp

Race information
- Distance: 1 1/16 miles (8.5 furlongs)
- Surface: Tapeta synthetic dirt
- Track: left-handed
- Qualification: Canadian-foaled two-year-old fillies
- Weight: Scale Weight
- Purse: CAN$250,000

The Princess Elizabeth Stakes is a Canadian Thoroughbred horse race run annually at Woodbine Racetrack in Toronto, Ontario. Run in mid October, the stakes race currently offers a purse of CAN$250,000, the richest race of the year for Canadian-foaled two-year-old fillies. It is contested at a distance of 1 1/16 miles on Tapeta synthetic dirt.

Inaugurated in 1946 as a six furlong sprint race at Toronto's Greenwood Raceway, the Princess Elizabeth Stakes was named in honor of Britain's future Queen, the then Princess Elizabeth. Since inception it has been raced at three different distances:

- 6 furlongs : 1946–1956 at Greenwood Raceway
- 7 furlongs : 1957–1958 at Greenwood Raceway and 1959–1960 at Woodbine Racetrack
- 8.5 furlongs : 1961 to present at Woodbine Racetrack

== Records ==
Speed record: (Through 1998, times were recorded in fifths of a second. Since 1999 they are in hundredths of a second)

- 1:43.48 – Ginger Gold (2001) (at current distance of 1 1/16 miles)

Most wins by an owner:

- 6 – Sam-Son Farm (1976, 1984, 1986, 1990, 2000, 2006)

Most wins by a jockey:

- 3 – Avelino Gomez (1957, 1960, 1964)
- 3 – Brian Swatuk (1968, 1978, 1990)
- 3 – Sandy Hawley (1970, 1973, 1988)
- 3 – Dave Penna (1983, 1985, 1986)
- 3 – Mickey Walls (1991, 1993, 1997)

Most wins by a trainer:

- 6 – Roger Attfield (1989, 1991, 1993, 1997, 2002, 2016)

== Winners of the Princess Elizabeth Stakes ==
Year	Winner	Jockey	Trainer	Owner	Time
2025	Piper's Gift	Rafael Hernandez	Dale A. Desruisseaux	Chiefswood Stable	1:46.39
2024	Aristella	Patrick Husbands	Rachel Halden	Flying Zee Racing Stables	1:48.78
2023	Inudation	Leo Salles	Kevin Attard	Al Ulwelling and Bill Ulwelling	1:45.33
2022	Jumpin Junie	Kazushi Kimura	Daniel J. Vella	Sea Glass Stables	1:43.61
2021	Moira	Justin Stein	Kevin Attard	SF Racing & X-Men Racing, Madaket Stables	1:44.63
2020	Dreaming of Drew	Patrick Husbands	Barbara J. Minshall	Hoolie Racing Stable	1:44.07
2019	Cool Shadows	Jerome Lermyte	Stuart C. Simon	Chiefswood Stable	1:45.45
2018	Bold Script	Gary Boulanger	Stuart C. Simon	Chiefswood Stable	1:45.20
2017	Clickity Clack	Rafael Hernandez	Tony Gattellaro	Tony Gattellaro, T. Baker, P. Statchuk, Carlson, etc.	1:46.07
2016	Ghostly Presence	Steven Bahen	Roger Attfield	Chiefswood Stable	1:43.90
2015	Caren	Jesse M. Campbell	Michael P. De Paulo	Robert Marzilli	1:44.56
2014	Brooklynsway	Emma-Jayne Wilson	John Ross	John Ross	1:44.35
2013	Paladin Bay	Gerry Olguin	Harold Ladouceur	Jessie L. Ladouceur	1:44.61
2012	Nipissing	Steve Bahen	Rachel Halden	Chiefswood Stable	1:45.25
2011	Rose and Shine	Luis Contreras	Ralph Biamonte	James Sabiston	1:45.56
2010	Grand Style	Eurico Rosa Da Silva	Michael Doyle	G. Watts Humphrey Jr.	1:46.31
2009	Roan Inish	David Moran	Carolyn M. Costigan	Robert J. Costigan	1:46.23
2008	Retraceable	Patrick Husbands	Mark E. Casse	Mark E. Casse	1:44.76
2007	Mrs. Began	Jim McAleney	Reade Baker	Zayat Stables LLC	1:47.10
2006	Catch the Thrill	Robert Landry	Mark Frostad	Sam-Son Farm	1:46.11
2005	Sugar Swirl	Todd Kabel	Robert J. Frankel	Stronach Stables	1:50.00
2004	Victorious Ami	Emile Ramsammy	David R. Bell	Ivan Dalos	1:48.44
2003	My Vintage Port	Jono Jones	Ken Parsley	Richard Pettifer/Parsley	1:48.95
2002	Kabeeb	Jim McAleney	Roger Attfield	Bill Werner et al.	1:49.49
2001	Ginger Gold	Richard Dos Ramos	Sid C. Attard	Jim Dandy Stable	1:43.48
2000	Dancethruthedawn	Gary Boulanger	Mark Frostad	Sam-Son Farm	1:44.56
1999	Talk Back	David Clark	Robert P. Tiller	Kinghaven Farms	1:44.80
1998	Bag Lady Jane	Todd Kabel	Patrick B. Byrne	Stronach Stables	1:46.40
1997	Primaly	Mickey Walls	Roger Attfield	Kinghaven Farms	1:44.00
1996	Navajo Pearl	Constant Montpellier	Daniel J. Vella	Frank Stronach	1:49.80
1995	Sammie'sidelady	Larry Attard	Alex Bankuti	Shadow Meadow Farm	1:49.40
1994	Bo Cheryl	Emile Ramsammy	Donald Drake	Joseph Shiewitz	1:46.40
1993	Term Limits	Mickey Walls	Roger Attfield	December Hill Farm	1:45.80
1992	Deputy Jane West	Robin Platts	Macdonald Benson	Lady Slipper Farm	1:45.20
1991	Vid Kid	Mickey Walls	Roger Attfield	Kinghaven Farms	1:47.40
1990	Wilderness Song	Brian Swatuk	James E. Day	Sam-Son Farm	1:47.60
1989	Super You	Richard Dos Ramos	Roger Attfield	Kinghaven Farms	1:50.20
1988	Sweet Briar Too	Sandy Hawley	George M. Carter	P. Lamantia et al.	1:47.60
1987	Galway Song	Julie Krone	William I. Mott	Bertram R. Firestone	1:48.00
1986	Ruling Angel	Dave Penna	James E. Day	Sam-Son Farm	1:47.40
1985	Stage Flite	Dave Penna	Arthur Mullen	Stafford Farms	1:47.60
1984	In My Cap	Jeffrey Fell	James E. Day	Sam-Son Farm	1:46.20
1983	Halo's Princess	Dave Penna	Frank Merrill Jr.	Kingsbrook Farm	1:47.60
1982	Appalachian Affair	Robin Platts	Michael Tammaro	Kinghaven Farms	1:47.20
1981	Choral Group	J. Paul Souter	Macdonald Benson	Windfields Farm	1:45.80
1980	Rainbow Connection	Gary Stahlbaum	Gerry Belanger	Fleetwood/Cameron	1:44.60
1979	Par Excellence	Lloyd Duffy	Jacques Dumas	Knightsbridge/Greenberg	1:49.20
1978	Sundae Star	Brian Swatuk	Glenn Magnusson	Hindmarsh/Magnusson	1:46.80
1977	L'Alezane	Rudy Turcotte	Yonnie Starr	Jean-Louis Levesque	1:46.20
1976	Loudrangle	Lloyd Duffy	Glenn Magnusson	Sam-Son Farm	1:44.60
1975	Regal Alibi	Jeffrey Fell	Edward Mann	J. M. B. Stable	1:47.00
1974	Ruthie's Run	Hugo Dittfach	Edward Mann	Jim Dandy Stable	1:45.40
1973	Trudie Tudor	Sandy Hawley	John Morahan	Doug Banks	1:47.40
1972	La Prevoyante	John LeBlanc	Yonnie Starr	Jean-Louis Levesque	1:47.40
1971	Dawn Deluxe	J. McKnight	Gil Rowntree	Stafford Farms	1:46.00
1970	Queen Louie	Sandy Hawley	W. Chris	Ca-Vett Stable	1:47.00
1969	Fanfreluche	Chris Rogers	Yonnie Starr	Jean-Louis Levesque	1:47.00
1968	Hello Lucky	Brian Swatuk	Donnie Walker	Conn Smythe	1:47.60
1967	Solometeor	Jerry Harrison	P. Richards	Windfields Farm	1:47.00
1966	Allquillo	Larry Adams	W. Woods	J. Hood	1:47.20
1965	Shipmate	Wayne Harris	William Thurner	Mrs. William Thurner	1:47.00
1964	Lady Victoria	Avelino Gomez	P. Richards	Windfields Farm	1:46.60
1963	Ciboulette	Keith Robinson	Duke Campbell	Jean-Louis Levesque	1:45.20
1962	Breezy Answer	Clifford Potts	Horatio Luro	Windfields Farm	1:48.40
1961	First Note	Harlon Dalton	Morris Fishman	Frank R. Conklin	1:44.80
1960	Victoria Regina	Avelino Gomez	Gordon J. McCann	Windfields Farm	1:24.80
1959	Naughty Flirt	Ernie Warme	Edward Mann	Gardiner / Bell	1:25.40
1958	Doug's Serenade	Con Errico	James C. Bentley	B. R. Steen	1:26.00
1957	Bonnie Flight	Avelino Gomez	Yonnie Starr	Conn Smythe	1:29.00
1956	Lady Ruth	Len Pong	A. H. Routcliffe	Armstrong Bros.	1:13.00
1955	Gracefield	R. Buisson	M. Long	Luxiana Stable	1:13.40
1954	Teddikins	G. Duprey	Johnny J. Thorpe	J. E. Frowde Seagram	1:12.20
1953	Windina	Gene Pederson	James C. Bentley	B. R. Steen	1:13.00
1952	Canadiana	Jose Vina	Gordon J. McCann	E. P. Taylor	1:12.40
1951	Summerhill	Pat Remillard	William Thurner	François Dupré	1:12.60
1950	Britannia	Gil Robillard	Gordon J. McCann	E. P. Taylor	1:14.00
1949	Isis	E. Jenkins	E. Rickard	Double Blue Stable	1:14.00
1948	Graydon Tina	F. Dodge	J. Nicholl	H. R. Bain	1:13.00
1947	Bunty Lou	Robert Watson	J. Higgins	Garden City Stable	1:15.60
1946	Casa Camara	Herb Lindberg	Robert K. Hodgson	William F. Morrissey	1:11.60
