= Nandi Stakes =

- Class: Restricted Stakes
- Location: Woodbine Racetrack; Toronto, Ontario, Canada
- Inaugurated: 1975
- Race type: Thoroughbred - Flat racing
- Website: www.woodbineentertainment.com

Race information
- Distance: Six furlong sprint
- Surface: Polytrack
- Track: left-handed
- Qualification: Two-year-olds fillies (Ontario Sire Stakes program)
- Weight: Allowances
- Purse: Can$95,488 (2015)

The Nandi Stakes is a Canadian Thoroughbred horse race run annually during the last week of July or first week of August at Woodbine Racetrack in Toronto, Ontario. An Ontario Sire Stakes, it is a restricted race for two-year-old fillies. A six-furlong sprint raced on Polytrack synthetic dirt, the Nandi Stakes currently carries a purse of $95,488.

The race was first run in 1975 and named to honor the filly Nandi, dam of Windfields. Since inception, it has been contested at various distances.

- 5 furlongs : 2006
- 5.5 furlongs : 1976-1979
- 6 furlongs : 1975, 1980-2005, 2007–present

In 1979, the Nandi Stakes was run in two divisions.

== Records ==
Speed record: (Through 1998, Woodbine times were recorded in fifths of a second. Since 1999 they are in hundredths of a second)

- 1:09.64 - Tree Pose (2010) (at current distance of six furlongs)

Most wins by an owner:

- 3 - Kinghaven Farms (1976, 1982, 1984)
- 3 - Sam-Son Farm (1983, 1986, 1990)

Most wins by a jockey:

- 4 - Patrick Husbands (2000, 2002, 2003, 2014)

Most wins by a trainer:

- 3 - James E. Day (1983, 1986, 1990)

== Winners ==
Year	Winner	Jockey	Trainer	Owner	Time
2015	Caren	Jesse M. Campbell	Michael P. De Paulo	Robert Marzilli	1:10.04
2014	Eff Bee Eye	Patrick Husbands	Robert P. Tiller	Davis/Tiller	1:11.17
2013	On Rainbow Bridge	Skye Chernetz	Dave Cotey	Triple K Stables	1:10.36
2012	Cryptic Message	Eurico Rosa da Silva	Ralph Biamonte	Eugene George	1:11.15
2011	Notacloudinthesky	Luis Contreras	Josie Carroll	Donver Stable	1:10.22
2010	Tree Pose	Jone Jones	Bill Tharrenos	Six Brothers Stables	1:09.64
2009	Oistins	James McAleney	Terry Jordan	James Redekop	1:12.22
2008	Cawaja Beach	Daniel David	Scott Fairlie	Hard Eight Stables & Ace Racing	1:11.01
2007	Executrix	Ray Sabourin	Nicholas Gonzalez	Tucci Stables	1:12.31
2006	Midnight Shadow	Ray Sabourin	Robert P. Tiller	Frank Digiulio, Jr.	0:58.02
2005	U R Flashy	James McAleney	Reade Baker	Harlequin Ranches	1:11.45
2004	Bosskiri	James McAleney	Reade Baker	Harlequin Ranches et al.	1:11.77
2003	La Grande Mamma	Patrick Husbands	Steve Owens	Great Plyer	1:12.73
2002	Boldest Of All	Patrick Husbands	Rita Schnitzler	Stubbs Investment Inc.	1:11.58
2001	Jade Eyed	Gerry Olguin	Kevin Attard	Stronach Stable	1:13.50
2000	Secret Lover	Patrick Husbands	Mark E. Casse	Heiligbrodt Racing	1:11.03
1999	Inspired Kiss	Todd Kabel	Thomas O'Keefe	Caroga Stables/Wings of Erin Farm	1:11.29
1998	Last Vice	David Clark	Phil Gracey	O'Cainon Stable	1:12.60
1997	Classic Ashlee	David Clark	Thomas R. Bowden	Colebrook Farms	1:12.00
1996	Classic Threat	Robert Landry	Macdonald Benson	Augustin Stable	1:11.20
1995	Northern Hilite	Jim McAleney	Glenn Magnusson	G. Vasey & D. Finn	1:14.60
1994	Pretoria	Robert Landry	Glenn Magnusson	Charles Burgess	1:12.80
1993	Celmis	Dave Penna	Michael J. Doyle	Eaton Hall Farm	1:12.60
1992	Deputy Jane West	Don Seymour	Macdonald Benson	Lady Slipper Farm	1:10.20
1991	Debra's Victory	Don Seymour	Jerry C. Meyer	Knob Hill Stable	1:13.00
1990	Victorian Angel	Brian Swatuk	James E. Day	Sam-Son Farm	1:12.60
1989	Attraction Fatale	Sandy Hawley	Phil Gracey	Come By Chance Stable	1:11.60
1988	Lady Summerhill	Lloyd Duffy	Gil Rowntree	Summerhill Farms	1:13.40
1987	Phoenix Factor	Irwin Driedger	Emile M. Allain	A. J. Anderson	1:12.00
1986	Ruling Angel	Jeffrey Fell	James E. Day	Sam-Son Farm	1:11.20
1985	Stage Flite	Jeffrey Fell	Arthur Mullen	Stafford Farms	1:12.40
1984	Festival Star	Jack Lauzon	John J. Tammaro, Jr.	Kinghaven Farms	1:12.40
1983	Sinister Gold	Robert Landry	James E. Day	Sam-Son Farm	1:13.00
1982	Candle Bright	Eric Beitia	John J. Tammaro, Jr.	Kinghaven Farms	1:13.00
1981	Alofje	Dan Beckon	Frank H. Merrill, Jr.	The Hodgson Stable	1:12.20
1980	No. One Bundles	Robin Platts	Monti Sims	Waxman / Wagman	1:11.80
1979	Solartic	Robin Platts	John Morahan	Doug Banks	1:04.40
1979	Cherry Berry	John LeBlanc	Jacques Dumas	E. Wilson	1:05.00
1978	Sinister Sue	J. Paul Souter	Gerry Belanger	E. Weiss & F. Stronach	1:06.40
1977	Gay Apparel	Gary Stahlbaum	Penny Ryan	Bo-Teek Farm	1:05.40
1976	Fairly Regal	Chris Rogers	Arthur H. Warner	Kinghaven Farms	1:07.20
1975	Seraphic	Sandy Hawley	Yonnie Starr	Jean-Louis Levesque	1:11.00
