= Bison City Stakes =

- Class: Restricted
- Location: Woodbine Racetrack; Toronto, Ontario, Canada
- Inaugurated: 1954
- Race type: Thoroughbred - Flat racing
- Website: web.archive.org/web/20100316214346/http://www.woodbineentertainment.com:80/qct/default.asp

Race information
- Distance: 1 1/16 miles (8.5 furlongs)
- Surface: dirt
- Track: left-handed
- Qualification: Three-year-old fillies
- Weight: Scale Weight
- Purse: $191,725 (2016)

The Bison City Stakes is a Thoroughbred horse race run annually at Woodbine Racetrack in Toronto, Ontario, Canada. Held during first week of July, it is open to Canadian-foaled three-year-old fillies. Since the 1999 creation of the Canadian Triple Tiara, the race has been the second leg of the series. It is contested over a distance of 1 1/16 miles on Polytrack synthetic dirt, the race currently offers a purse of $191,725.

The Bison City Stakes was first run in 1954 at Fort Erie Race Track in Fort Erie, Ontario. Since inception it has been contested at two different distances and at two different venues:

- 6 1/2 furlongs : 1954–1964 at Fort Erie
- 1 1/16 miles : 1965–1976 at Fort Erie, 1977–1979 at Woodbine Racetrack, 1980–2006 at Fort Erie or Woodbine, 2007 to present at Woodbine

It was run in two divisions in 1956 and 1962. In 1991, Francine Villeneuve became the first female jockey to win the race. In 2003 there was a Dead heat for first.

== Records ==
Speed record: (Through 1998, Woodbine times were recorded in fifths of a second. Since 1999 they are in hundredths of a second)

- 1:42.15 - Awesome Rush (2005)

Most wins by an owner:

- 7 - Sam-Son Farm (1972, 1984, 1985, 1987, 1991, 2000, 2003)

Most wins by a jockey:

- 5 - Avelino Gomez (1959, 1964, 1965, 1967, 1972)
- 5 - Patrick Husbands (2004, 2006, 2007, 2017, 2019)

Most wins by a trainer:

- 5 - Mark E. Casse (2006, 2007, 2017, 2018, 2019)

== Winners ==
Year	Winner	Jockey	Trainer	Owner	Time
2024	Stormcast	Patrick Husbands	Mark Casse	KEM Racing Stables	1:43.25
2023	Me and My Shadow	Emma-Jayne Wilson	Mark Casse	D J Stable	1:44.30
2022	Sister Seagull	Antonio Gallardo	Catherine Day Phillips	Sean & Dorothy Fitzhenry	1:44.48
2021	Il Malocchio	Patrick Husbands	Martin Drexler	Franco Meli	1:43.42
2020	Mizzen Beau	Steven Bahen	Norm Casse	Daniel Investment Holdings	1:44.35
2019	Speedy Soul	Patrick Husbands	Mark E. Casse	Joey Gee Thoroughbreds	1:44.51
2018	Safe to Say	Jerome Lermyte	Mark E. Casse	Gary Barber and Windways Farm	1:44.41
2017	Enstone	Patrick Husbands	Mark E. Casse	East West Stables	1:44.88
2016	Caren	Jesse M. Campbell	Michael P. De Paulo	Robert Marzilli	1:45.47
2015	Brooklynsway	Emma-Jayne Wilson	John A. Ross	J.R. Racing Stable Inc.	1:44:06
2014	Unspurned	Justin Stein	Roger Attfield	Christine Hayden	1:45.47
2013	Original Script	Jesse M. Campbell	Paul Attard	Chiefswood Stable	1:45.09
2012	Blue Heart	Alex Solis	Brian Lynch	Amerman Racing	1:45.77
2011	Bear Its Time	Luis Contreras	Reade Baker	Bear Stables, Ltd.	1:44.72
2010	Free Fee Lady	Emma-Jayne Wilson	Reade Baker	Harlequin Ranches	1:44:02
2009	Dance for Us	Chantal Sutherland	Barbara J. Minshall	Minshall Farms	1:44.59
2008	Nicki Knew	Jim McAleney	Kevin Attard	Knob Hill Stable	1:44.82
2007	Sealy Hill	Patrick Husbands	Mark E. Casse	Melnyk Racing stable	1:44.01
2006	Kimchi	Patrick Husbands	Mark E. Casse	Seasoft Stable	1:42.92
2005	Ready and Alluring	Todd Kabel	Randy Schulhofer	William A. Sorokolit, Sr.	1:43.15
2004	Touchnow	Patrick Husbands	Reade Baker	George Farr	1:45.57
2003	Seeking the Ring (DH)	Slade Callaghan	Mark Frostad	Sam-Son Farm	1:44.23
2003	Brattothecore (DH)	Jake Barton	John A. Ross	Jam Jar Racing	1:44.23
2002	Silver Nithi	Mickey Walls	David R. Bell	Dick & Jo Ellen Shaw	1:44.00
2001	Quick Blue	Emile Ramsammy	Linda L. Rice	J. P. Lacombe	1:43.60
2000	Catch The Ring	Robert Landry	Mark Frostad	Sam-Son Farm	1:45.64
1999	Synchronized	Tyrone Harding	Reade Baker	John A. Franks	1:44.67
1998	Regal Angela	Martin Ramirez	Robert P. Tiller	Hillsbrook Farms	1:46.80
1997	Nithi	Mickey Walls	David R. Bell	J. E. & R. F. Shaw	1:45.20
1996	Silent Fleet	Steve Bahen	Bernard Girault	Peter Chiodo	1:44.20
1995	Woolloomooloo	Todd Kabel	David R. Bell	R. F. & J. E. Shaw	1:43.20
1994	Mysteriously	Todd Kabel	Daniel J. Vella	Frank Stronach	1:46.20
1993	Hey Hazel	Don Seymour	Roger Attfield	Michael Canino	1:43.80
1992	Hope For A Breeze	Herb McCauley	Paul Nielsen	Hopefield Farm	1:43.80
1991	Wilderness Song	Francine Villeneuve	James E. Day	Sam-Son Farm	1:42.40
1990	Lubicon	Don Seymour	Roger Attfield	Kinghaven Farms	1:46.40
1989	Coral Bracelet	Sandy Hawley	Macdonald Benson	Windfields Farm	1:43.80
1988	Volterra	Sandy Hawley	Patrick Collins	Knob Hill Stable	1:45.00
1987	Ruling Angel	Dave Penna	James E. Day	Sam-Son Farm	1:44.00
1986	Playlist	Richard Dos Ramos	Roger Attfield	Kinghaven Farms	1:47.40
1985	In My Cap	Jeffrey Fell	James E. Day	Sam-Son Farm	1:46.00
1984	Classy 'n Smart	Irwin Driedger	James E. Day	Sam-Son Farm	1:43.20
1983	Northern Blossom	Dan Beckon	Gil Rowntree	B. K. Y. Stables	1:45.80
1982	Avowal	Brian Swatuk	Arthur H. Warner	Richard R. Kennedy	1:43.80
1981	Rainbow Connection	Gary Stahlbaum	Gerry Belanger	Fleetwood/Cameron	1:44.00
1980	Cherry Berry	Gary Stahlbaum	Jacques Dumas	E. Wilson	1:45.80
1979	Come Lucky Chance	Gary Stahlbaum	Cliff C. Hopmans	Conn Smythe	1:46.60
1978	La Voyageuse	J. Paul Souter	Yonnie Starr	Jean-Louis Levesque	1:44.00
1977	Fairly Regal	Don MacBeth	John Tammaro, Jr.	Kinghaven Farm	1:42.60
1976	Bye Bye Paris	Jeffrey Fell	Donnie Walker	Conn Smythe	1:43.20
1975	Deepstar	Lloyd Duffy	David Guitard	Kinghaven Farm	1:43.20
1974	Snow Game	Robin Platts	David C. Cross Jr.	J. F. Hand	1:43.80
1973	Victorianette	Richard Grubb	A. Chris	S. Asadoorian	1:46.60
1972	Takaring	Avelino Gomez	Arthur H. Warner	Sam-Son Farm	1:44.00
1971	Lauries Dancer	Robin Platts	James C. Bentley	Helen G. Stollery	1:42.80
1970	Fanfreluche	Chris Rogers	Yonnie Starr	Jean-Louis Levesque	1:43.40
1969	Sno Where	David Dennie	L. Grant	Green Hills Farm	1:43.20
1968	Hometown News	Robin Platts	Gil Rowntree	Stafford Farms	1:44.60
1967	Lady Taj	Avelino Gomez	Lou Cavalaris, Jr.	G. Gardiner/Golden West	1:47.60
1966	Shipmate	Noel Turcotte	William Thurner	W. J. Farr	1:44.40
1965	Tie Pilot	Avelino Gomez	William Thurner	W. J. Farr	1:46.20
1964	Ramblin Road	Avelino Gomez	Gordon Huntley	Gordon F. Hall	1:16.80
1963	Cesca	Jake Burton	H. Hoffman	Stafford Farms	1:19.20
1962	Vase	Pat Remillard	Robert S. Bateman	William R. Beasley	1:18.80
1962	Sun Dan	James Fitzsimmons	William Thurner	W. J. Farr	1:18.40
1961	Glencoe Kid	Al Coy	Douglas M. Davis Jr.	Mrs. Henry Hecht	1:18.40
1960	Hidden Treasure	Al Coy	John Passero	William R. Beasley	1:17.00
1959	Winning Shot	Avelino Gomez	Richard Townrow	J. S. Evans	1:17.00
1958	Silver Ship	Ernie Warme	Gordon Huntley	Gordon F. Hall	1:20.20
1957	Pink Velvet	Edward Plesa, Sr.	John Passero	William R. Beasley	1:18.40
1956	Flying Trapeze	R. Bureau	E. Howard	Lanson Farm	1:19.00
1956	Compactor	T. Johnson	Richard Townrow	J. Tomlinson	1:19.60
1955	Black Coyote	David Stevenson	John Passero	William R. Beasley	1:20.00
1954	Silly Sara	George Walker	John Passero	William R. Beasley	1:18.80
