= Budpath =

Canadian-bred Thoroughbred racehorse

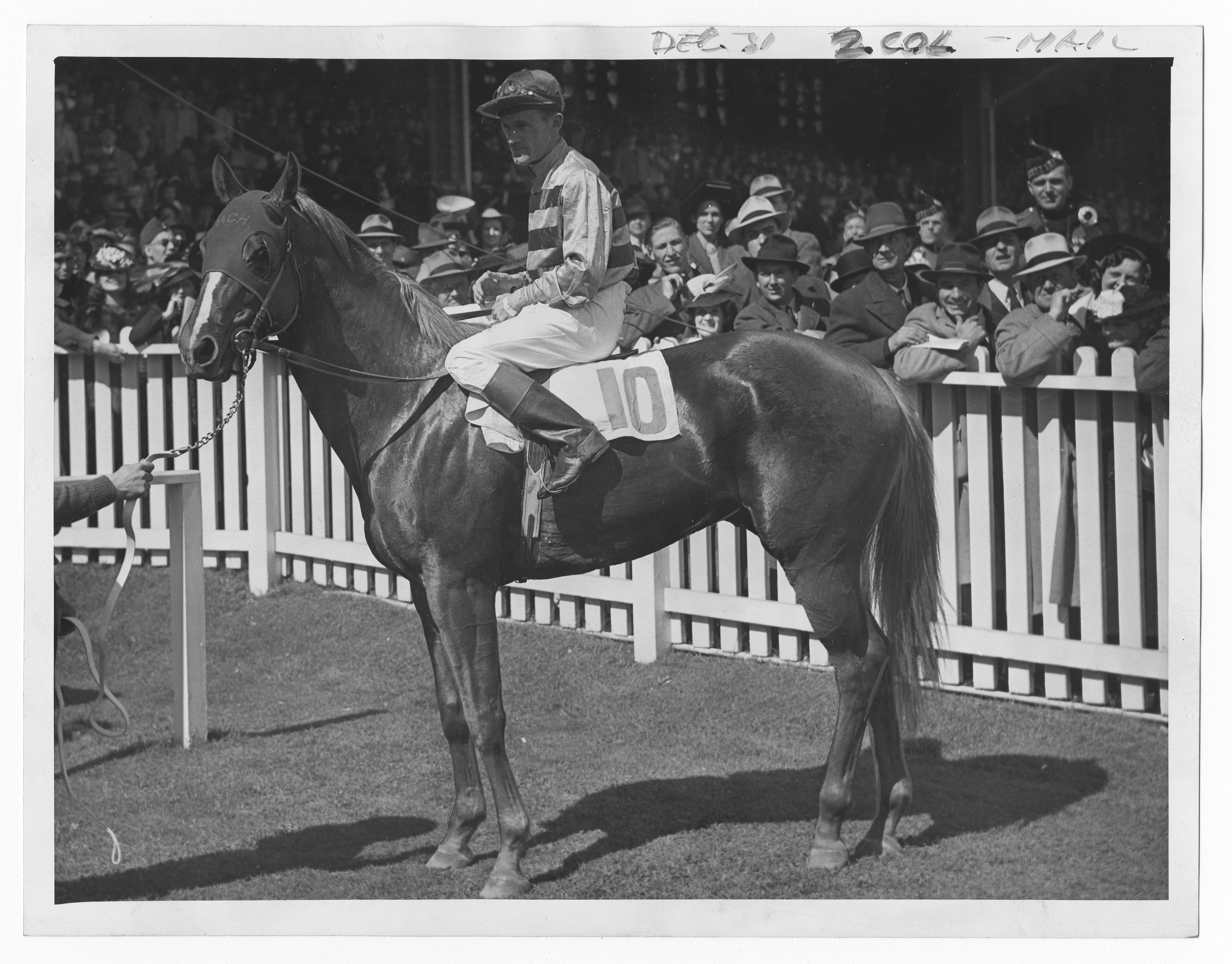
- Racehorse Budpath
- Sire: Buddy Bauer
- Grandsire: North Star
- Dam: Luress
- Damsire: Sweepster
- Sex: Stallion
- Foaled: 1938
- Country: Canada
- Colour: Chestnut
- Breeder: Harry C. Hatch
- Owner: Harry C. Hatch
- Trainer: Loyd Gentry, Sr.
- Record: 12: 5-3-2
- Earnings: $16,740

Major wins
- Hare Memorial Handicap (1941); Canadian Derby (1941) Canadian Classic Race wins: King's Plate (1941)

Budpath (1938–1942) was a Canadian Thoroughbred racehorse best known for winning Canada's most prestigious race, the King's Plate. Owned and bred by distilling magnate and prominent Thoroughbred owner Harry C. Hatch, he was out of the mare Luress. His sire Buddy Bauer competed in all three of the 1927 American Classic Races and his grandsire North Star, was imported from England by Edward R. Bradley to stand at his Idle Hour Stock Farm in Kentucky where he sired Kentucky Derby winner, Bubbling Over.

Trained by Loyd Gentry, Sr., from twelve career starts Budpath finished out of the money only two times. As a two-year-old, his best result in a major race for his age was a third in Mrs. Orpen's Cup and Saucer Handicap. Racing at age three in 1941, he was ridden by future Canadian Horse Racing Hall of Fame jockey Robert B. Watson. Budpath and Watson won the King's Plate at Toronto's Old Woodbine Race Course then traveled 1,300 miles (2,100 km) by train to Polo Park Racetrack in Winnipeg, Manitoba where he won the Canadian Derby.

Sent back to race at age four in 1942, Budpath collapsed on the track and died of a heart attack.
