= Ontario Colleen Stakes =

- Class: Grade III
- Location: Woodbine Racetrack; Toronto, Ontario, Canada
- Inaugurated: 1979
- Race type: Thoroughbred - Flat racing
- Website: woodbineentertainment.com

Race information
- Distance: 1 mile (8 furlongs)
- Surface: Turf
- Track: Left-handed
- Qualification: Three-year-old fillies
- Weight: Allowance conditions
- Purse: Can$150,000
- Bonuses: (Up to $30,000 for Eligible Ontario-bred horses)

The Ontario Colleen Stakes is a Canadian Thoroughbred horse race run annually at Woodbine Racetrack in Toronto, Ontario. Open to three-year-old fillies, it is raced on turf over a distance of one mile (8 furlongs). Prior to 2016, it was run in late August but now is run in late September.

Inaugurated in 1979 at the Fort Erie Racetrack, the following year it was moved to the Woodbine Racetrack. It remained there through 1993 and then returned to Fort Erie for the 1994 running. Since 1995 it has been at the Woodbine facility.

The race was run in two divisions from 1979-1989, 1993, 1995-1996.

It became a Grade III race in 2011.

== Records ==
Speed record:

- 1:33.32 - Leigh Court (2013)

Most Jockey Wins:

- 5 - Patrick Husbands (2011, 2017, 2018, 2021, 2022)

Most Trainer Wins:

- 8 - Mark E. Casse (2010, 2017, 2018, 2020, 2021, 2022, 2024, 2025)

Most Owner Wins:

- 2 - Live Oak Plantation (2021, 2022)
- 2 - Melnyk Racing Stables (2010, 2013)

== Winners since 1998 ==
Year	Winner	Jockey	Trainer	Owner	Time
2026	Dakotah Blue	Jose Luis Campos	Rachel Halden	Flying Zee Racing Stable	1:35.20
2025	Candy Quest	Sihan Civaci	Mark E. Casse	Glassman Racing LLC	1:33.51
2024	Time to Dazzle	Sihan Civaci	Mark E. Casse	Tracy Farmer	1:33.57
2023	Mohawk Trail	Adam Beschizza	Kelsey Danner	NBS Stable	1:34.68
2022	Souper Hoity Toity	Patrick Husbands	Mark E. Casse	Live Oak Plantation	1:35.01
2021	Our Flash Drive	Patrick Husbands	Mark Casse	Live Oak Plantation	1:34.76
2020	Chart	Justin Stein	Mark Casse	D. J. Stable LLC	1:35.24
2019	Seek And Destroy	Luis Contreras	Chad C. Brown	e Five Racing Thoroughbreds	1:35.65
2018	Got Stormy	Patrick Husbands	Mark E. Casse	Gary Barber	1:34.59
2017	Enstone	Patrick Husbands	Mark E. Casse	East West Stables	1:34.28
2016	Caren	Jesse M. Campbell	Michael P. De Paulo	Robert Marzilli	1:35.26
2015	Don't Leave Me	Eurico Rosa Da Silva	Malcolm Pierce	Pin Oak Stable	1:35.70
2014	Speed Seeker	Luis Contreras	Joan Scott	Johnson/Coniglio/Rendina/Ferrigine	1:34.91
2013	Leigh Court	Gary Boulanger	Josie Carroll	Melnyk Racing Stables	1:33.32
2012	Colonial Flag	Joseph Rocco, Jr.	Michael Matz	Skara Glen Stable/Farish/ENL Stables	1:35.15
2011	Anne's Beauty	Patrick Husbands	Paul Attard	Robert Smithen	1:33.70
2010	Barracks Road	Corey Fraser	Mark E. Casse	Melnyk Racing Stables	1:34.95
2009	Lady Shakespeare	Emma-Jayne Wilson	Roger Attfield	Charles E. Fipke	1:36.79
2008	Sugar Bay	Jono Jones	Macdonald Benson	Augustin Stable	1:34.44
2007	Speak Wisely	Todd Kabel	Mark Frostad	Sam-Son Farm	1:34.71
2006	Essential Edge	Jono Jones	Eric Coatrieaux	Chiefswood Stable	1:35.96
2005	Elle Runway	Emile Ramsammy	Malcolm Pierce	Live Oak Racing	1:36.11
2004	Emerald Earrings	Jake Barton	Bruce F. Alexander	Daniel Herrmann	1:33.40
2003	Shaconage	Joe Johnson	Mitch Shirota	Andrena Van Doren	1:33.76
2002	Strait From Texas	Dino Luciani	Paul Buttigieg	James A. Michael	1:34.59
2001	Soundtrack	Gary Boulanger	Michael J. Doyle	John Storer	1:37.26
2000	Diadella	David Clark	Malcolm Pierce	Stronach Stable	1:35.23
1999	Celestialbutterfly	James McKnight	Roger Attfield	Harlequin Ranches	1:35.85
1998	Heliotrope	Neil Poznansky	David R. Bell	Richard F. & Jo Ellen Shaw	1:35.00

== See also ==
- List of Canadian flat horse races
