= RJS =

RJS may refer to:

- Raymond James Stadium, Tampa, Florida, US
- Rachel Joy Scott (1981–1999), American child murder victim
- Robert James Speers (1882–1955), Canadian horse breeder
