= Clickity Clack =

Canadian-bred Thoroughbred racehorse

Clickity Clack (foaled March 25, 2015, in Ontario, Canada) was a Stakes Race winning Canadian Thoroughbred racehorse. Clickity Clack was sired by Silent Name (JPN), and is best known for her tactical closing speed, often spotting other horses large leads before overtaking them down the final stretch. Clickity Clack was bred by Michelle Love and Robert Love, and was owned by Tony Gattellaro, Paul Statchuk, Andrew Carlson, Dave Carlson, Tamara Baker & John Gallagher. Clickity Clack was trained by Tony Gattellaro and TMG Racing Stables. Clickity Clack was purchased by Tony Gattellaro & team for US$15,260 in August 2016 at the Canadian Thoroughbred Horse Society (Ontario Division) Canadian-Bred Yearling Sale.

Clickity Clack finished 2nd in her first career start, losing by a head in a photo finish. Clickity Clack earned her Maiden win on October 7, 2017, at Woodbine Racetrack in Toronto. On October 29, 2017, Clickity Clack won the 72nd running of the $225,000 Princess Elizabeth Stakes, going off at 10–1 odds. The Princess Elizabeth Stakes is the richest race of the year for Canadian-foaled two-year-old fillies. Prior to winning her first stakes race, many experts thought very highly of Clickity Clack and what she might accomplish in her career.

Steven Bahen rode Clickity Clack in her first two starts. Rafael Hernandez| rode her to victory in her next two starts, giving Clickity Clack finishes of 2nd–7th-1st–1st in her first four races to start her career. After winning the Princess Elizabeth Stakes, Clickity Clack ran in the South Ocean Stakes on short rest, racing to a 3rd-place finish. In 2018, Clickity Clack posted a 2nd place finish in her first race of the year in the Eternal Search Stakes on August 5. Clickity Clack ran once more in 2018, finishing in 5th place in the La Prevoyante Stakes on November 10.

Clickity Clack finished her racing career with earnings of US$162,463.

== Race Record ==
| FINISH | DATE | RACE | DISTANCE | JOCKEY | MARGIN | TRACK |
|---|---|---|---|---|---|---|
| 5th | 11/10/2018 | La Prevoyante Stakes (Black Type) | 1 ^{1}/_{16} Miles | Omar Moreno | 3 ^{1}/_{2} | Woodbine |
| 2nd | 8/5/2018 | Eternal Search Stakes (Black Type) | 1 ^{1}/_{16} Miles | Patrick Husbands | Head | Woodbine |
| 3rd | 11/15/2017 | South Ocean Stakes (Black Type) | 1 ^{1}/_{16} Miles | Rafael Hernandez | 1 | Woodbine |
| 1st | 10/29/2017 | Princess Elizabeth Stakes (Black Type) | 1 ^{1}/_{16} Miles | Rafael Hernandez | Neck | Woodbine |
| 1st | 10/7/2017 | Maiden Special Weight | 7 Furlongs | Rafael Hernandez | 1 | Woodbine |
| 7th | 8/29/2017 | Muskoka Stakes (Black Type) | 6 ^{1}/_{2} Furlongs | Steven Bahen | 7 | Woodbine |
| 2nd | 8/7/2017 | Allowance | 6 Furlongs | Steven Bahen | Neck | Woodbine |
