= Steady Growth Stakes =

- Class: Restricted Stakes
- Location: Woodbine Racetrack; Toronto, Ontario Canada
- Inaugurated: 1997
- Race type: Thoroughbred - Flat racing
- Website: www.woodbineentertainment.com

Race information
- Distance: 1 1/16 miles (8.5 furlongs)
- Surface: Tapeta
- Track: left-handed
- Qualification: Three-year-olds & up (Ontario Sire Stakes program)
- Weight: Allowances
- Purse: $95,313

The Steady Growth Stakes is a Thoroughbred horse race run annually in early June at Woodbine Racetrack in Toronto, Ontario, Canada. An Ontario Sire Stakes, it is a restricted race for horses age three and older. Raced over a distance of 1 1/16 miles on Polytrack synthetic dirt, the Steady Growth Stakes currently carries a purse of $95,313

Inaugurated in 1997, the race is named in honor of Steady Growth, the 1979 Queen's Plate winner and Canadian Champion 3-Year-Old Colt.

== Records ==
Speed record:

- 1:42.20 - Deputy Inxs (1997)

Most wins:

- 3 - Barbeau Ruckus (2003, 2005, 2006)
- 3 - Pender Harbour (2012, 2014, 2015)

Most wins by a jockey:

- 3 - Na Somsanith (1997, 1999, 2001)
- 3 - Todd Kabel (1998, 2005, 2006)
- 3 - Luis Contreras (2012, 2014, 20150
- 3 - Eurico Rosa Da Silva (2009, 2013, 2016)

Most wins by a trainer:

- 2 - Abraham Katryan (2000, 2002)
- 2 - Ross Armata (2003, 2005)
- 3 - Mike DePaulo (2012, 2014, 2015)

Most wins by an owner:

- 3 - Thayalan Muthulingham (2003, 2005, 2006)

== Winners ==
Year	Winner	Age	Jockey	Trainer	Owner	Time
2016	Where's the Widget	4	Eurico Rosa Da Silva	Ralph J. Biamonte	Mary E. Biamonte	1:45.21
2015	Pender Harbour	7	Luis Contreras	Mike DePaulo	Giffin/Andrews/Lazaruk	1:43.08
2104	Pender Harbour	6	Luis Contreras	Mike DePaulo	Giffin/Andrews/Lazaruk	1:42.39
2013	Ultimate Destiny	4	Eurico Rosa da Silva	Alec Fehr	Alec Fehr	1:44.33
2012	Pender Harbour	4	Luis Contreras	Mike DePaulo	Giffin/Andrews/Lazaruk	1:44.62
2011	Sand Cove	6	Richard Dos Ramos	Roger L. Attfield	Ralph L. Johnson	1:44.61
2010	Sand Cove	5	Richard Dos Ramos	Roger Attfield	Ralph L. Johnson	1:42.69
2009	Michael's Bad Boy	6	Eurico Rosa da Silva	Nicholas Gonzalez	Joan Agro	1:43.53
2008	Dancer's Bajan	4	Corey Fraser	Robert P. Tiller	3 sons Racing Stable	1:44.41
2007	Executive Choice	6	Emile Ramsammy	Reade Baker	J. Aston/P. Buzzi/A. Onesi	1:43.68
2006	Barbeau Ruckus	7	Todd Kabel	George Newland	Thayalan Muthulingham	1:44.64
2005	Barbeau Ruckus	6	Todd Kabel	Ross Armata	S.Armata/T.Muthulingham	1:45.69
2004	Norfolk Knight	5	Jillian Scharfstein	Hugo Dittfach	Margaret Squires	1:44.54
2003	Barbeau Ruckus	4	Constant Montpellier	Ross Armata	S.Armata/T.Muthulingham	1:45.12
2002	Runaway Love	5	Emile Ramsammy	Abraham Katryan	Brandon Brako Stable et al.	1:44.67
2001	Casino Prince	4	Na Somsanith	John Cardella	John W. Hillier	1:44.25
2000	One Way Love	5	Patrick Husbands	Abraham Katryan	G. Schickedanz & J. W Hillier	1:44.74
1999	Silks Or Scarlet	5	Na Somsanith	Dan O'Callaghan	Norcliffe Stable	1:44.40
1998	Terremoto	7	Todd Kabel	Beverly Buck	Mr. & Mrs. Everatt	1:44.60
1997	Deputy Inxs	6	Na Somsanith	Audre Cappuccitti	Audre & Gordon Cappuccitti	1:42.20
