= Robert James Speers =

R. James Speers
- Born: September 3, 1882; Elmbank, Ontario, Canada
- Died: July 19, 1955 (aged 72); Winnipeg, Manitoba, Canada
- Resting place: Elmwood Cemetery, Winnipeg
- Occupations: Businessman, Racehorse owner/breeder, Racetrack owner
- Spouse: Annie Ella Troughton
- Children: 2
- Awards: Canadian Breeder of the Year (1946-1951)
- Honors: Canada's Sports Hall of Fame (1966); Canadian Horse Racing Hall of Fame (1976); Manitoba Sports Hall of Fame and Museum (1983); R. James Speers Memorial Handicap at Assiniboia Downs

Robert James Speers (September 3, 1882 – July 19, 1955) was a Canadian businessman and Canada's Sports Hall of Fame inductee who made a major contribution to the growth of Thoroughbred horse racing in Western Canada.

Born in Elmbank, Ontario, James Speers moved to Winnipeg in 1900. In 1920 he headed a partnership that leased and operated the River Park race track. Two years later he built Whittier Park Racetrack in St. Boniface, Manitoba and then in 1923, the Polo Park Racetrack in Winnipeg and Chinook Park in Calgary, Alberta.

== Whittier Park Stock Farm ==
In 1925, James Speers founded the Prairie Thoroughbred Breeders' Association and began breeding Thoroughbreds that would earn him six consecutive Canadian Breeder of the Year Awards between 1946 and 1951. His Whittier Park Stock Farm not only won races at his own track but at the hub of Canadian racing in Toronto where his colt Lord Fairmond notably won a division of the 1948 Plate Trial Stakes and the Prince of Wales Stakes. Speers stud bred Canadian Horse Racing Hall of Fame Youville as well as Loyalist, the winner of the 1955 Canadian Derby.

James Speers was inducted in Canada's Sports Hall of Fame in 1966, was part of the 1976 inaugural class of inductees in the Canadian Horse Racing Hall of Fame, and was inducted in the Manitoba Sports Hall of Fame and Museum in 1983.

Following the devastation of the 1950 Red River Flood, James Speers donated the entire profits from his 1950 racing meetings to the Flood Relief Fund.

James Speers died of a heart attack at age 72 in 1955 and was buried in Winnipeg's Elmwood Cemetery.
