= Pender Harbour (horse) =

Canadian Thoroughbred racehorse

- Sire: Philanthropist
- Grandsire: Kris S.
- Dam: Uproar
- Damsire: Hail the Ruckus
- Sex: Gelding
- Foaled: 2008
- Country: United States
- Colour: Chestnut
- Breeder: Gardiner Farms
- Owner: Dennis Andrews, Sandra Lazaruk, Robert & Roberta Giffin
- Trainer: Michael P. De Paulo
- Record: 41: 12–10–8
- Earnings: $$1,860,283

Major wins
- Kingarvie Stakes (2010); Bunty Lawless Stakes (2011, 2012); Elgin Stakes (2012, 2014); Steady Growth Stakes (2012, 2014, 2015) Canadian Triple Crown: wins: Prince of Wales Stakes (2011); Breeders Stakes (2011)

Awards
- Canadian Champion 3-Year-Old Male Horse (2011)

Pender Harbour (foaled 2008 in Ontario) was a Canadian National Champion Thoroughbred racehorse that, under jockey Luis Contreras, won two legs of the Canadian Triple Crown series in 2011 and was voted Canadian Three-Year-Old Champion Colt.

== Racing career ==
Named for Pender Harbour, British Columbia, an unincorporated community within the Sunshine Coast Regional District, he raced for six years for his owners, winning eight other stakes races. The durable Pender Harbour competed for the last time on November 29, 2015, finishing second to Melmich in the mile and three-quarter Valedictory Stakes run in track record time. A gelding, after retirement he became a riding horse in Western Canada for his Alberta owners.
