= Elmbank, Ontario =

- Ghost town
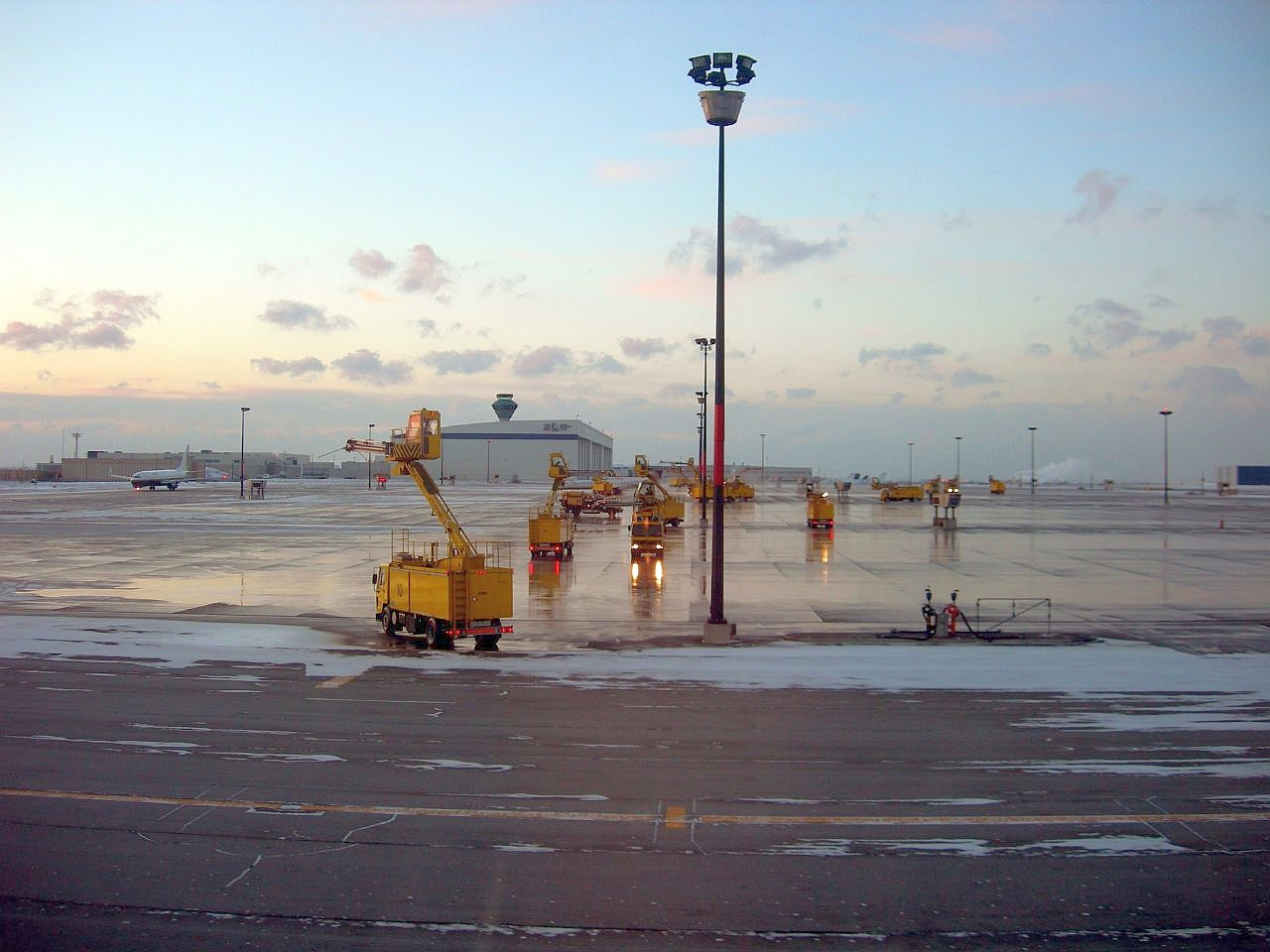
- Looking north toward the former Hamlet of Elmbank, now occupied by the de-icing facility at Pearson Airport
- Interactive map of Elmbank, Ontario
- Coordinates: 43°40′27″N 79°37′33″W
- Country: Canada
- Province: Ontario
- Regional municipality: Peel
- City: Mississauga
- Time zone: UTC-5 (EST)
  - Summer (DST): UTC-4 (EDT)
- NTS Map: 030M12

Elmbank is a ghost town in Mississauga, Ontario, Canada.

The hamlet at the intersection of Fifth Line East (now Torbram Road) and Britannia Road was once a thriving 19th century rural community. It was later cleared for expansion of the Toronto Pearson International Airport.

A part of the original Britannia Rd. still exists, now as a street east of the airport named "Elmbank Road". Nothing remains of the former community.

== History ==
Map of Toronto Township in Peel County showing Elmbank, 1880

Land in the area was cleared for farming beginning in the mid 1820s. The first resident was John Grubb, who emigrated from Scotland in 1831. Grubb built a home overlooking Etobicoke Creek, and named the place Elmbank.

Other settlers followed, and the Elmbank community soon had a blacksmith, store, inn, schoolhouse, cheese factory, carriage maker, and Sons of Temperance Society Hall. No mills were located there.

The Elmbank Post Office operated from 1873 to 1915, and the first postmaster, William McKay, operated out of his store.

Shell's Chapel was built south of the community in 1831, named after Jacob and Henry Shell. The chapel was renamed Bethany Wesleyan Methodist Church and Cemetery, and then Bethany United Church in 1925. The last service was held in 1956, and the graves were relocated to Riverside Cemetery in Etobicoke.

Elmbank was noted for its importance to Toronto's Catholic community. The Catholic Mission and Cemetery, a log church constructed in 1833, was located in Elmbank and parishioners would travel from Toronto for mass or funerals. In 1885, a red brick church and rectory replaced the log church. The last recorded mass took place in 1915, and the church was torn down in 1932. Materials from the church such as pews, bricks and stained glass windows were reused in neighbouring churches.

Residents of Elmbank had a close association with the community of Malton, located a short distance northeast. The Elmbank soccer team, composed of young men from Elmbank and Malton, won the Peel league championship. Residents of Elmbank also participated in Malton's day-long Callithumpian Parade, held annually beginning in 1896. The Sons of Temperance Society Hall was also used occasionally for lectures organized by the Malton Women's Institute, founded in 1906.

Elmbank's population peaked at 300 in 1886, and had declined to about 30 by 1926.

In 1937, the Toronto Harbour Commission selected Malton as the site for Toronto's airport. The rural land near Elmbank was expropriated and its buildings demolished for successive expansions of the airport. By the 1950s, the only visible remnant of the Elmbank community was the Catholic cemetery.

== Cemetery relocation ==
The Catholic cemetery, also called the Elmbank/Fifth Line Cemetery, was used for over 600 burials, the last taking place in 1937. Access to the cemetery was limited after that, as it was located on airport property.

The cemetery was damaged by Hurricane Hazel in 1954, after which most of the headstones were moved, though 23 headstones remained, delineating both individual and family plots.

In the 1990s, plans were started to permit the building of an east–west runway, and the associated taxiway would have directly affected what remained of the cemetery. An application was submitted to relocate the graves.

Archaeological Services Inc. (ASI) was hired in 2000 to assist with the cemetery's relocation. Excavation of the site began in 2001, when ASI located the stone foundation of the red brick church and rectory, as well as fragments of ceramics and stained glass. The headstones were removed, and 622 bodies were exhumed. By October 2001, the Elmbank Cemetery had been completely relocated to the Assumption Cemetery, a short distance northwest of the airport. It was the largest historic cemetery relocation in Ontario history. Living descendants were consulted and records of the area were researched so that the graves could be placed at the new site as close as possible to their original placements. Attention was paid to maintaining the closeness of family members.

A final mass was celebrated at the old cemetery on August 27, 2000, and on July 10, 2004, a mass took place for the relocated dead at Assumption Cemetery.

== Notable people ==
- Robert James Speers, businessman and Canadian Sports Hall of Fame inductee who contributed to the growth of thoroughbred horse racing in Western Canada.
