= A Fleet's Dancer =

American-bred Thoroughbred racehorse

- Sire: Afleet
- Grandsire: Mr. Prospector
- Dam: My Dream Come True
- Damsire: Vice Regent
- Sex: Stallion
- Foaled: 1995
- Country: Canada
- Colour: Chestnut
- Breeder: OWD Inc
- Owner: Cam Allard
- Trainer: Roger L. Attfield
- Record: 45: 12-6-8
- Earnings: $1,036,649

Major wins
- Canadian Derby (1998); Dominion Day Handicap (2001); Durham Cup Handicap (2001)

Awards
- Canadian Champion Older Male Horse (2001)

A Fleet's Dancer (February 19, 1995 — 2007) was a Kentucky-bred racehorse that became a competitive runner in Canada.

== Race career ==
While he was a black-type winner throughout his career, with a win in the Grade III Canadian Derby during his three-year-old year, his best year was his six-year-old season. He would go on to win two Grade III races, Dominion Day Handicap and Durham Cup Handicap; while placing in the grade two Saratoga Breeders' Cup Handicap, and Kentucky Cup Classic Handicap. His performances in these races would win him the 2001 Sovereign Award for Champion Older Male Horse.

== Retired ==
A Fleet's Dancer retired in 2002 to Anson Stud Farm in Caldon East, Ontario, Canada. He sired a few stakes performers, but nothing close to his caliber. He only produced a few crops before he was euthanized in 2007. It's rumored that he had a difficult temperament and injured a farm employee before being put down.
