= Caren (horse) =

Canadian-bred Thoroughbred racehorse

- Sire: Society's Chairman
- Grandsire: Not Impossible (IRE)
- Dam: Jo Zak
- Damsire: Vilzak
- Sex: Filly
- Foaled: April 27, 2013
- Country: Canada
- Colour: Bay
- Breeder: James & Janeane Everatt, and J. Arika Everatt-Meeuse
- Owner: Robert Marzilli
- Trainer: Michael De Paulo
- Record: 17: 9–2–2
- Earnings: US$821,790

Major wins
- Shady Well Stakes (2015); Nandi Stakes (2015); Victorian Queen Stakes (2015); Princess Elizabeth Stakes (2015); Ontario Colleen Stakes (2016); Carotene Stakes (2016) Canadian Triple Tiara wins: Bison City Stakes (2016); Wonder Where Stakes (2016)

Awards
- Canadian Horse of the Year (2016); Sovereign Award for Champion 3-Year-Old Filly (2016)

Caren (foaled April 27, 2013) is a retired Canadian Thoroughbred racehorse. A multiple stakes winner at ages two and three, she was named the 2016 Canadian Horse of the Year. She finished her career with a record of 9 wins from 17 starts, and earnings of US$821,790.

== Background ==
Caren is a bay filly who was bred in Ontario by James and Janeane Everatt and Arika Everatt-Meeuse of Shannondoe Farm. She was the first winner from the first crop of foals sired by Society's Chairman, who did not make his racing debut until age five but then became a stakes-winning sprinter. Her dam Jo Zak was unraced but proved a successful broodmare, producing nine winners from twelve runners.

Caren was sold as a yearling at the 2014 Fasig-Tipton fall yearling sale for $45,000 to trainer Michael De Paulo.

== Racing career ==
=== 2015: two-year-old season ===
Caren made six starts at age two, all at Woodbine Racetrack near Toronto, Ontario. She won her debut on June 6, 2015 in a maiden special-weight race and followed up with wins in the Shady Well and Nandi Stakes. Stepping up in class for the Grade II Natalma Stakes, she finished third behind eventual Canadian Horse of the Year Catch A Glimpse. Caren finished her two-year-old campaign with wins in the Victorian Queen and Princess Elizabeth Stakes. With five wins to her name in 2015, she was a finalist for the Sovereign Award for Champion 2-Year-Old Filly, but lost to Catch A Glimpse.

=== 2016: three-year-old season ===
Caren made her three-year-old debut on March 19, 2016 in the Any Limit Stakes at Gulfstream Park, finishing sixth. Returning to Woodbine for the Lady Angela Stakes on May 1, she was caught near the wire by Crumlin Spirit and finished second. On May 15, Caren again finished second, this time to Gamble's Ghost in the Selene Stakes. On June 12, Caren finished third behind longshot Neshama and Gamble's Ghost in the Woodbine Oaks, the first leg of the Canadian Triple Tiara.

On July 10, Caren ended her losing streak in the Bison City Stakes, the second leg of the Triple Tiara. She went to the early lead and set a moderate pace, then withstood a late run by Trini Brewnette and Neshama to win by a length. "She finally got a little racing luck and it went a little bit more her way. She showed what kind of horse she is," said jockey Jesse Campbell. "She's a little piece of iron. She had a (great) 2-year-old campaign and the way she trains and her attitude, she's a tough cookie. She has talent to boot. It's a tough combo."

On August 7, Caren entered the third leg of the Triple Tiara, the Wonder Where Stakes, run at a distance of 1 1/4 miles on Woodbine's turf course. The leader from start to finish, she won by three lengths over Conquest Dynasty. "She's just a pro," said Campbell. "She's just gotten to where she doesn't want me to be real aggressive any more. She's given me everything she has to begin with. We let her do her thing, and she just keeps on truckin'."

On September 24, Caren won her first graded stakes race, the Ontario Colleen Stakes. (Note: Her previous stakes wins came in races restricted to Canadian-bred horses) She set the early pace then withstood late challenges by first Thundering Sky then Shake Down Baby to win by a nose.

Caren extended her winning steak to four races in the Carotene Stakes on October 23, prevailing by a length. Campbell never used the whip, explaining, "The quieter you sit on her, the better. She's gotten to where she just doesn't want to be hit. And you know what, the bottom line is, she's giving you all she can anyway, she's running as fast as she can."

Caren finished the year on November 25 in the Mrs. Revere Stakes at Churchill Downs. After being challenged for the early lead by several other fillies, Caren tired and finished eleventh. Despite the loss, she was named the 2016 Canadian Horse of the Year and Champion 3-Year-Old Filly.

=== 2017: four-year-old season ===
Caren made her four-year-old debut on April 23 in the six-furlong Whimsical Stakes, finishing fifth. She then finished fourth in the Nassau Stakes on May 27 in what proved to be her final race. She was being prepared for a start in the Dance Smartly Stakes when she suffered a soft tissue injury. Caren was officially retired in November.

== Pedigree ==
Pedigree of Caren, bay filly, April 27, 2013
Sire Society's Chairman 2003	Not Impossible (IRE); 1997	Sadler's Wells	Northern Dancer
Sire Society's Chairman 2003	Not Impossible (IRE); 1997	Sadler's Wells	Fairy Bridge
Sire Society's Chairman 2003	Not Impossible (IRE); 1997	Ball Chairman	Secretariat
Sire Society's Chairman 2003	Not Impossible (IRE); 1997	Ball Chairman	A Status Symbol
Sire Society's Chairman 2003	Athena's Smile; 1996	Olympio	Naskra
Sire Society's Chairman 2003	Athena's Smile; 1996	Olympio	Carols Christmas
Sire Society's Chairman 2003	Athena's Smile; 1996	Sun for All	One for All
Sire Society's Chairman 2003	Athena's Smile; 1996	Sun for All	Sunday Strait
Dam Jo Zak 1994	Vilzak; 1983	Green Dancer	Nijinsky
Dam Jo Zak 1994	Vilzak; 1983	Green Dancer	Green Valley II
Dam Jo Zak 1994	Vilzak; 1983	Zippy Do	Hilarious
Dam Jo Zak 1994	Vilzak; 1983	Zippy Do	Towson Miss
Dam Jo Zak 1994	Jo's Princess; 1988	Temerity Prince	Cornish Prince
Dam Jo Zak 1994	Jo's Princess; 1988	Temerity Prince	Miss Quickstep
Dam Jo Zak 1994	Jo's Princess; 1988	La Josy	Grey Dawn II
Dam Jo Zak 1994	Jo's Princess; 1988	La Josy	Bend an Oar (family: 10-a)

Caren is inbred 4 × 5 × 5 to Northern Dancer, meaning Northern Dancer appears once in the fourth generation of her pedigree and twice in the fifth generation.
