= Fort Erie Race Track =

Horse racetrack in Ontario, Canada

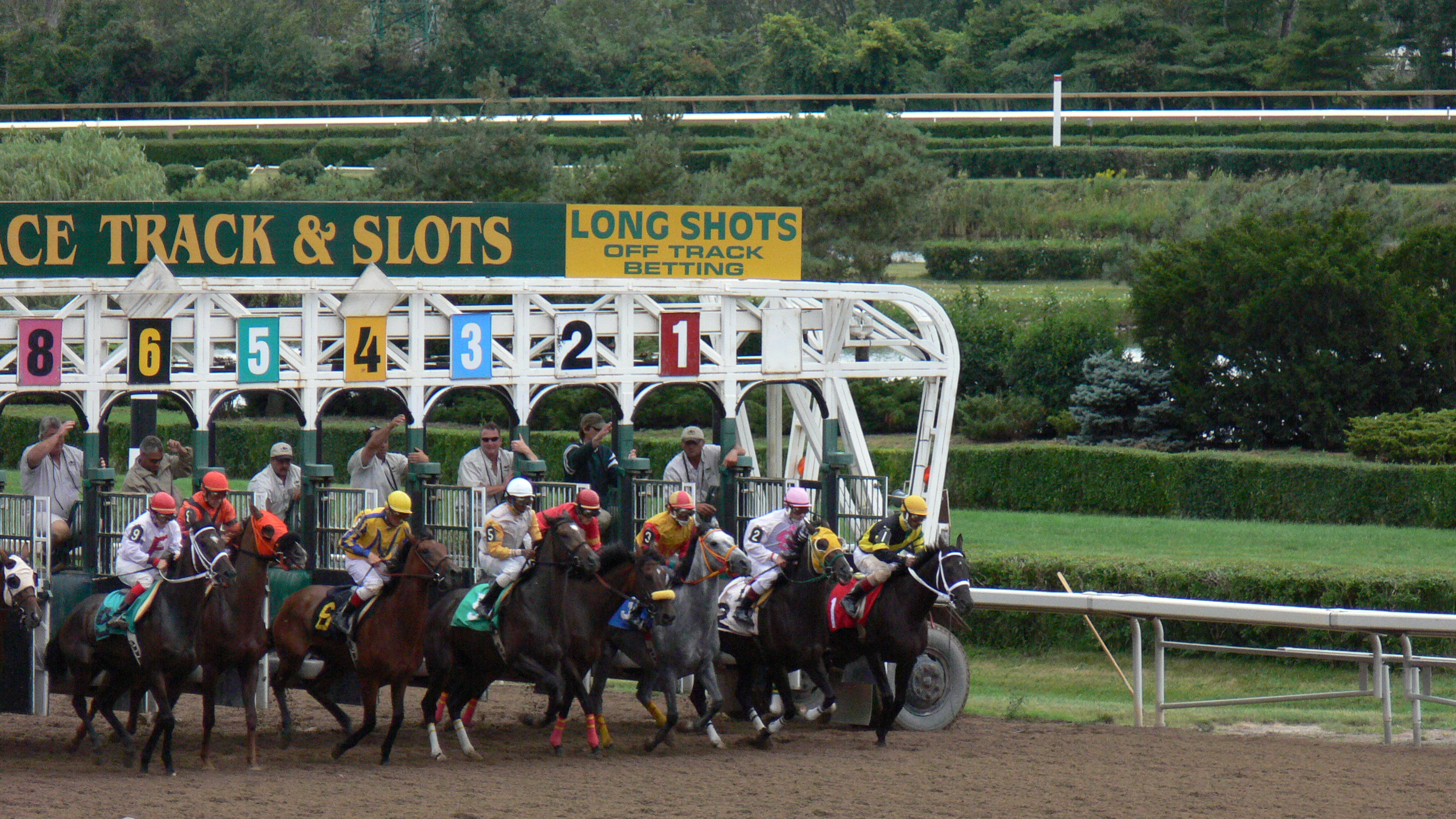
- Fort Erie Race Track in 2006
- Interactive map of Fort Erie Race Track
- Location: 230 Catherine Street; Fort Erie, Ontario, Canada
- Coordinates: 42°55′7″N 78°56′7″W
- Owned by: Carl Paladino, Joe Mosey and Joel Castle
- Date opened: 16 June 1897
- Course type: Flat/thoroughbred
- Notable races: Prince of Wales Stakes

Fort Erie Race Track is a horse racing facility in Fort Erie, Ontario, Canada, that opened on June 16, 1897. The racetrack is often referred to as "the border oval" because of the track's proximity (barely a mile) to the U.S. border. Its most important race is the Prince of Wales Stakes, the second leg of the Canadian Triple Crown.

== History ==
Fort Erie Race Track was built by the Fort Erie Jockey Club and opened on June 16, 1897. It was at one time owned by the Cella family, who also owned Oaklawn Park in Hot Springs, Arkansas. They sold it in 1952 to renowned Canadian horseman E. P. Taylor, acting on behalf of the Ontario Jockey Club. Prior to this acquisition, Fort Erie was regarded as a "ramshackle" facility that was restricted to only 14 days of racing a year. Taylor closed many of the smaller tracks around Ontario and instead focused on developing Thoroughbred racing in Toronto and Fort Erie. Taylor expanded the racing season for Fort Erie to 42 days over the summer. He also hired horticulturist Gene Muma, who transformed the facility into "physically, the most beautiful race course in North America."

In 1996, the Ontario government announced that it would open casinos, to be operated by the Ontario Lottery and Gaming Corporation (OLG), at racetracks across the province. To compensate the tracks for the use of their facilities and potential "cannibalization" of customers, the OLG directed 20% of the revenue from slot machines to the racetracks, which responded by increasing purse sizes. However, the subsidy was abruptly removed in June 2012, leading to the announcement that Fort Erie Race Track would close at the end of the year. The track inked a one-year transition funding deal with the province in early 2013, which allowed it to open and run the 2013 season.

In November 2013 plans were unveiled by the Fort Erie Live Racing Consortium for the track to host a festival meet around the theme of the Chinese Year of the Horse, with the Prince of Wales Stakes running in July. The plan also called for horse training to begin in late April, followed by a point-based racing tournament running through early August. Racing continued on until early October, with a total of 400 races across the season.

A consortium led by American businessmen Carl Paladino, Joel Castle and Joe Mosey purchased the property in August 2014. Paladino stated that he had planned to invest in the track to capitalize on the construction of Canadian Motor Speedway, but that the speedway's status in "development hell, "which Paladino blamed on the Liberal Party of Ontario's opposition to an exit ramp off the Queen Elizabeth Way for the speedway, led him to consider selling off the track if the Liberals won the 2018 provincial election. At one point, Paladino listed the property of roughly 300 acres in several parcels with a total value of Can$17.25 million. However, with the 2018 election of the Conservative party, Paladino announced that he would hold on to the race track, even as the speedway project was officially abandoned in 2020.

In 2018, the Ontario government reached a 19 year funding agreement with Ontario Racing. "A few years ago, Fort Erie wondered if they would survive," said John Hayes, chairman of Ontario Racing. "It's time to stop worrying about the past. Instead of worrying about putting food on the table, we need to worry about how we can flourish and thrive."

== Racing fixtures ==
The Prince of Wales Stakes is Fort Erie's most important annual event. It was first run in 1929 but achieved its current prominence in 1959 when E.P. Taylor made it the second leg of the Canadian Triple Crown. Among the winners of the Prince of Wales are New Providence, With Approval, Dance Smartly, Peteski and Wando.

The Puss N Boots Cup is run annually at the start of the fall meeting. It is named after the horse Puss N Boots, who was leading in the Vandal Stakes (then run at Fort Erie) when he decided to jump the inner hedge near the finish line. The horse landed in one of the infield ponds, dumping his jockey in the process. In recognition, the winning jockey of the Cup jumps into the pond in celebration.

A number of other stakes races were once run at Fort Erie but have since been transferred to Woodbine. This includes the Bison City Stakes, the second leg of the Canadian Triple Tiara for fillies. Northern Dancer won the Summer Stakes in 1963 when it was still run at Fort Erie.

Dachshund racing was added to the track's schedule in 2018; the success of the first race held that year led to the addition of a Basset Hound race for 2019.
