= Canadian Motor Speedway =

Proposed motorsports park in Ontario, Canada

- Location: Fort Erie, Ontario, Canada
- Coordinates: 42°55′40.9″N 78°59′12.3″W
- Capacity: 65,000
- Website: -

Oval
- Surface: Asphalt
- Length: 1.2 km (0.75 mi)

Road course
- Surface: Asphalt
- Length: 3.2 km (2.0 mi)

Canadian Motor Speedway was a proposed motorsports park that was planned to be built in Fort Erie, Ontario, Canada. The development would have been located on an 821 acres (332 hectares) adjacent to the Queen Elizabeth Way highway. It was planned to consist of a 1.2 kilometre (¾ mile) progressive bank oval and 3.2 kilometres (2.0 miles) road course. With 65,000 seats and 40 suites, Canadian Motor Speedway would have been the largest speedway in Canada and the second-largest sporting venue, in terms of seating capacity, in the country (behind only Montreal's Olympic Stadium). Its proposed location had proximity to a large market area, being 6.4 kilometres (4.0 miles) from the Canada/USA border with Buffalo, New York, and 17 kilometres (11 miles) from Niagara Falls.

It was a hybrid development with aspects that would have made it unique from other racetracks. It was planned to have two race courses as well as Research and Development, Light Industrial, and Commercial areas on the site. A specific objective was to develop relevance for motorsports through the initiatives of the Research and Development area, which concentrates on advancing fuels, materials and power train technologies, while augmenting environmental sustainability through a bio diversity initiative.

Further expected benefits from the development included providing a strong employment base, with a projected 730 operational jobs for the Speedway, R&D, Light Industrial and Commercial zones and 1,200 construction jobs over 21 months for the speedway and road course. Events were expected to draw patrons from areas outside of the Niagara region to increase the number of tourists to the area.

Daily activities pitched as part of the project included R&D testing, road course track days (for car and motorcycle clubs), driver experience sessions on the oval, corporate team-building seminars/track time, charity fundraiser events, motocross and kart practice sessions, and snowmobile sessions in season. The Speedway was expected to feature 10 summer weekend Special Events, under a permit from the Town of Fort Erie.

None of Canadian Motor Speedway's developers could be contacted from 2018 to 2020. The speedway had been given until 2020 to begin construction before the government revokes the zoning privileges necessary for the project to go forth; its developers emerged weeks before that deadline to request an extension, citing a change in financial backing. After the extension was granted, then allowed to expire, the purpose speedway grounds were put up for sale, ending the project.

== Design ==
Canadian Motor Speedway was planned to feature many unique aspects for the racetrack layout and the total development. The design team was announced to be led by 4-time NASCAR Sprint Cup Series champion Jeff Gordon.

The development would have been made up of three core areas, the oval and road course, centrally located, the research and development area to the south and east of the site, and the Commercial area to the north. The major parking and camping areas would have been located to the immediate west and southwest of the development.

One of the central design/development parameters was the 250 acres (100 hectares) environmental element. A master planned biodiversity park would have been employed to enhance sustainability and passive connectivity throughout the site.

=== Speedway ===
Centering the layout was planned to be a 1.2 km (¾ mile) oval with progressive banking. The oval would have had 60,000 grandstand seats, 5,000 club seats and 80 suites along its start/finish straight for spectators. The speedway had been pre-approved to expand to as many as 100,000 grandstand seats. Inside the oval was planned to house the race garages, medical and media centre. The expectation was that the versatility of the infield would have allowed for a multitude of non-racing events including ice hockey, various winter sports, as well as concerts and other popular entertainment events.

=== Road course ===
A multi-configuration road course was planned. The 3.2 km (2.0 mi) FIM/FIA track Was to have incorporated the oval through tunnels in and out under the back straight of the oval. This design was planned to be unique in providing a "stadium section" for the road course that will utilize the permanent seating of the oval. The planned elevations of the site would have allowed the spectators in the oval grandstand to see the oval section as well as the back section of the road course. A second configuration would have been separate from the oval, and used only the back section of the road course to allow the oval and back road course to be used independently. A 2nd paddock area was planned to have been built along the longest straight to accommodate the back course. The road course paddock area would have also been the location of light industrial buildings for race teams and motorsport related shops.

=== Research and development ===
A Research and Development campus, in collaboration with McMaster University's Faculty of Engineering, Niagara College, and other education partners was announced to be constructed on the southern portion of the site. This R&D Centre / Innovation Park portion of the development was limited to 80 acres (32 hectares) by the Special Policy Area Zoning By-law. On July 7, 2014, a Memorandum of Understanding with Niagara College was signed to also explore the potential for CMS to host classes, co-op students and post-graduate placements in automotive power programs as well as hospitality, renewable technologies, innovation, media, business, and more.

=== Commercial ===
A 74-acre (30 hectare) commercial and retail area was approved to the north of the site and would have been a part of the second phase.

== Development process ==
The Canadian Motor Speedway was conceptualized in 2005. Site selection and investment began in 2007. Previous attempts at a speedway in Niagara, were made by other individuals and failed primarily due to lack of resources, a workable business plan, and a flawed development strategy. A complete review of the business model coupled by the formulation of alliances with Jeff Gordon Inc., and other development partners resulted in an opportunity that would meet investor expectations while creating significant value for local communities in the area. Following 14 months of comprehensive studies, that included 22 reports, the planning submission for a special policy area was made to the Town of Fort Erie and Region of Niagara in February/March 2009.

A public open house hosted by Canadian Motor Speedway was held on June 4, 2009, to introduce the project to the public. The first presentation to Fort Erie Town council came on September 8, 2009, with the report from town staff of the application to amend the Fort Erie Official Plan and Zoning By-law. Requests for recommendation reports on the Official Plan Amendment and Regional Official Plan Amendment were made on November 23, 2009, and November 25, 2009, respectively. On December 7, 2009, following a 6+ hour council meeting that had 59 delegations the Town of Fort Erie Council voted unanimously to approve the Official Plan Amendment. On December 9, 2009, the Region of Niagara council also voted unanimously to approve the Regional Official Plan Amendment. The by-laws to enact the amendments were passed on December 14 by the Town of Fort Erie and February 11, 2010, by the Region of Niagara.

On September 7, 2010, the planning staff of the Town of Fort Erie submitted a recommendation report No. CDS-048-10 to council to approve the re-zoning application, of Canadian Motor Speedway. The report was accepted and Fort Erie Town council voted unanimously to approve the re-zoning By-law No. 106-10 for the property for Canadian Motor Speedway after the third reading on September 13, 2010. The 821 acres (332 hectares) site of the Canadian Motor Speedway is considered a Special Policy Area for the use of motorsport related activities.

Appeals against the development were taken to the Ontario Municipal Board for hearing in June 2012. A decision was rendered on November 5, 2012, to approve the development and allow it to proceed, with certain holding provisions, to the next stage in the development process.

On October 9, 2013, construction began for the initial re-development of Miller Creek - a significant environmental enhancement on the site. The speedway is now expected to be completed by 2017.

In the July 28, 2014 issue of Maclean's Magazine, an article about Canadian Motor Speedway appeared in the Economy section.

On September 11, 2014, Jeff Gordon was in Toronto for the 'Chase Across North America' Sprint Cup Championship media tour and spoke of Canadian Motor Speedway.

An update on July 5, 2016, stated that the land required had not been purchased, and the developers now claimed they will have a building permit by 2017. No completion date for the project had been offered lately by the developers, but Fort Erie mayor Wayne Redekop told Buffalo radio station WBFO, that the speedway could be open by either late 2018 or "the first quarter of 2019.":

As of April 2018, development remained stalled. Developers refused to build the speedway unless an exit ramp is constructed for it off the Queen Elizabeth Way, a proposal the Ontario government at the time opposed (it was deposed in the 2018 elections). The process remained completely stalled even after the change in government. In July 2019, the St. Catharines Standard attempted to follow-up with CMS officials regarding the project's status and was hung up on by all relevant parties. The speedway has until September 13, 2020—the date that the speedway's zoning waiver expires—to file for a building permit; if none is filed by then, the project will be forcibly cancelled and the land will revert to being zoned for agriculture. In August 2020, the project's developers emerged to request an extension on its zoning waiver, stating that a major backer from Kuwait had dropped out of the project and that they planned on beginning construction in early 2021 if the waiver were extended. The waiver was granted, with an expiration of November 2021. In spring 2021, the owner, still unable to secure replacement funds, began putting some of the peripheral land up for sale; surrounding landowners noted that he had not approached them about buying the necessary parcels to allow the project to move forward. The waiver expired in November, ending the project.

== See also ==
- List of auto racing tracks in Canada
