= Donald G. Willmot =

Canadian businessman (1916–1994)

- Born: Donald Gilpin Willmot; 1916
- Died: January 31, 1994 (aged 77–78)
- Occupations: Businessman, horse breeder
- Known for: Kinghaven Farms
- Political party: Conservative
- Board member of: Anthes Imperial Limited; Molson Industries Limited; Ontario Jockey Club
- Spouse: Ivy
- Children: David S. Willmot; Michael Willmot Wendy Willmot
- Honors: Canadian Horse Racing Hall of Fame (1991)

Donald Gilpin "Bud" Willmot (1916 – January 31, 1994) was a Canadian businessman, philanthropist and owner of Kinghaven Farms, a Thoroughbred horse racing stable located in King City, Ontario.

== Business career ==
Willmot was the president and CEO of Anthes Imperial Limited, a diversified Canadian public company that he joined in 1949. The company owned a number of businesses, including ones involved in construction equipment rental, steel materials, office furniture and supplies, and public warehousing. Anthes Imperial was acquired by Molson Industries Limited in 1968. Willmot was subsequently appointed as chairman of Molson Industries, and he oversaw a series of successful acquisitions in the early 1970s.

In his 1975 landmark book, The Canadian Establishment, author Peter Newman quoted (p. 145) Willmot's opposition to the Government of Canada's plan to create the Canada Pension Plan, stating that it was a threat to Canada's free enterprise system.

== Thoroughbred racing ==
In 1973, Willmot became a founding member of the Jockey Club of Canada and a member of its Board of Trustees. He would later become a member of The Jockey Club in the United States.

In 1984, Willmot lost out in the bidding to Jack Kent Cooke in an attempt to buy the prestigious Elmendorf Farm near Lexington, Kentucky, from the estate of Maxwell H. Gluck. Although planning to remain in racing, on November 7, 1988, Kinghaven Farms held a dispersal sale of its breeding stock. Willmot was inducted into the Canadian Horse Racing Hall of Fame in 1991.

== Final years ==
In 1989, Willmot was given an honorary Doctor of Laws from Brock University in St. Catharines, Ontario. He was a benefactor to a number of charities, including Brock University, which annually awards the "Dr. D.G. (Bud) Willmot Scholarship in Business." Each fall and spring, Brock University conducts the "Willmot Distinguished Lecture Series".

After battling cancer for six months, Willmot died on January 31, 1994. Two days later, his widow Ivy also died of cancer.
