= Northern Mile Racetrack =

Casino and horse racing track

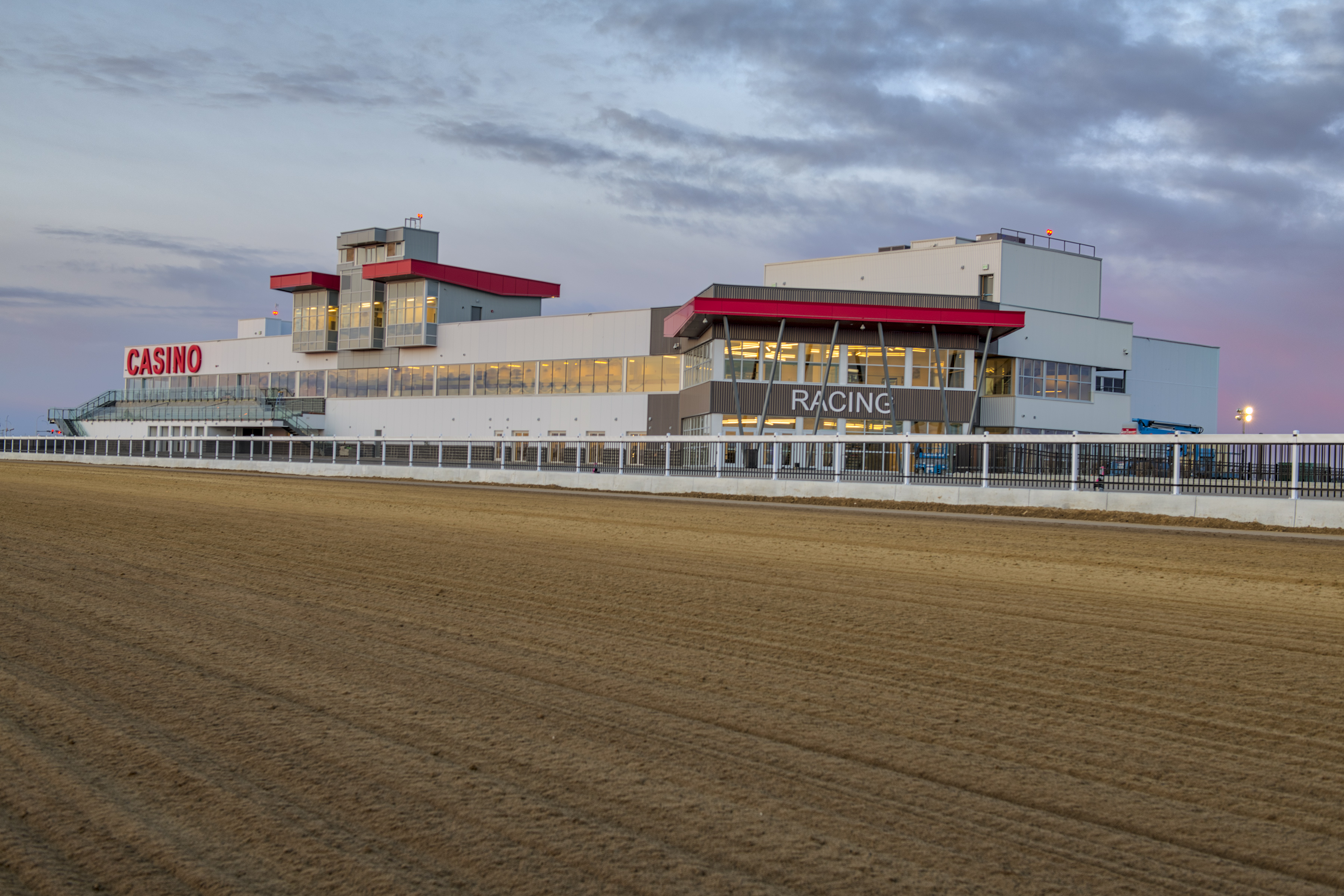
- Interactive map of Northern Mile Racetrack
- Location: 4711 Airport Perimeter Road; Edmonton International Airport, Alberta; T9E 0V6
- Coordinates: 53°18′58″N 113°33′38″W
- Owned by: Vici Properties
- Operated by: Highfield Investment Group
- Date opened: April 1, 2019
- Race type: Quarterhorse, Standardbred and Thoroughbred racing
- Course type: Flat dirt one mile (eight furlongs)
- Notable races: Canadian Derby (G3), Century Casino Oaks, Northlands Park Distaff

Northern Mile Racetrack (formerly Century Mile Racetrack and Casino) is a casino and horse racing facility in Leduc County, Alberta, next to the Edmonton International Airport. It is one of two "A-level" horse racing venues in the province of Alberta, and the only "A-level" one-mile racetrack in western Canada. It is owned by Vici Properties and operated by Highfield Investment Group.

The track opened on April 1, 2019 as Century Mile Racetrack, serving as the replacement for Northlands Park. Public transit to the facility is offered via Edmonton Transit Service route 747 to the airport, and Leduc Transit route 10 (connecting via Edmonton International Airport).

== History ==
In February 2016, Northlands announced that racing would end at Northlands Park after the 2016 season, following 116 years of operation. As part of its "Northlands Vision 2020" proposals, Northlands had proposed the redevelopment of Northlands Park as an "urban festival site" capable of hosting large-scale outdoor events. The organization projected it would no longer be "financially viable" once the Edmonton Oilers' new downtown arena Rogers Place opens, as it would attract the majority of major indoor events previously held at the Northlands-operated Coliseum (then Rexall Place).

Horse Racing Alberta stated that it would pursue a new venue in the region, and stated that "Obviously we are disappointed in their decision to leave racing at Northlands Park", and that it would "work with Northlands Park as they transition out of racing to minimize the impact on our industry." In May 2016, it solicited expressions of interest for a new "A-level" track license, including from Century Casinos (who owns Alberta's other A-level circuit, Century Downs near Calgary) and Enoch Cree Nation among others. In September 2016, Horse Racing Alberta announced that it had accepted the bid by Century Casinos, which planned to build a racetrack and casino in Leduc. Century planned to build a one-mile track (in comparison to the 5/8-mile Northlands Park), which would be the only one of its kind in Western Canada. The track would inherit events formerly held at Northlands Park, including the Canadian Derby.

Horse Racing Alberta reached agreements with Northlands to continue racing at Northlands Park while the new facility was under construction. It officially opened on April 1, 2019.

On September 6, 2023, Century sold the properties of four of its casinos—including Century Mile—to real estate investment form Vici Properties for C$222 million in a leaseback agreement.

In September 2026 Highfield Investment Group purchased the operating business of Century Mile, as well as Century Downs Racetrack in Alberta (now Chinook Downs), from Century for US$16.4 million. In November 2026, the Century branding was removed from the property and it was renamed as Northern Mile Racetrack. The casino will be known as Spire Casino.

== Racing ==
The following graded stakes run at Northern Mile Racetrack:

Grade III:

- Canadian Derby (2019 - Present)

The following are major events hosted at Century Mile Racetrack and Casino:

- Canadian Derby (2019 - Present)
- National Driving Championship (2022)

== See also ==
- List of casinos in Canada
