= Polo Park Racetrack =

Former horse racing venue in Manitoba

Coordinates: 49.8839°N 97.1995°W

- Interactive map of Polo Park Racetrack
- Location: Winnipeg, Manitoba; Canada
- Owned by: R. James Speers
- Date opened: 1925
- Date closed: 1956
- Course type: six furlong oval track for Flat racing for Thoroughbreds
- Notable races: Manitoba Stakes (1930–1956), Manitoba Derby

The Polo Park Racetrack was a Canadian horse racing facility in Winnipeg, Manitoba. Considered one of the finest racetracks in Western Canada, it was built by Canadian Horse Racing Hall of Fame inductee R. James Speers. The six-furlong track opened in 1925 (replacing Speer's River Park Racetrack) under the charter of the Winnipeg Jockey Club and the charter of St. Vital Agricultural Society in Winnipeg, Manitoba. At the same time, James Speers founded the Prairie Thoroughbred Breeders' Association to promote a breeding industry in Western Canada. In 1930 he created the Canadian Derby, a premier race for Canadian-bred three-year-old Thoroughbreds hosted by Polo Park Racetrack until its closure in 1956.

Besides the track, the facility had stables, grandstand and clubhouse for the Manitoba Jockey Club. In the winter the racetrack constructed two large toboggan slides, which operated in each direction.

James Speers acquired land to build what would become Assiniboia Downs and granted an option on the Polo Park lands to real estate developers who wished to build a shopping centre on the site. Speers died in July 1955 and Polo Park Racetrack closed at the end of the 1956 racing season. The new mall opened in 1959. Winnipeg did not have a racing meet in 1957, but Assiniboia Downs opened in June 1958 and racing continued.
