= John J. Tammaro Jr. =

Personal information
- Born: September 22, 1925 Baltimore, Maryland, United States
- Died: February 25, 2001 (aged 75)
- Occupations: Jockey & Trainer

Horse racing career
- Sport: Horse racing
- Career wins: 2,042

Major racing wins
- As a trainer: Oceanport Handicap (1972); Massachusetts Handicap (1974); Autumn Stakes (1977); Jockey Club Cup Handicap (1978); Queen's Plate (1979); Grey Stakes (1980); Coronation Futurity Stakes (1980); Nandi Stakes (1982, 1984); Summer Stakes (1982); Breeders' Stakes (1983); Prince of Wales Stakes (1983); Shady Well Stakes (1982, 1983, 1984); Shepperton Stakes (1984)

Racing awards
- Leading trainer at Calder Race Course (1986, 1987, 1988); Leading trainer at Tropical Park (1986/87, 1988, 1988/89)

Honours
- Calder Race Course Hall of Fame (1999)

Significant horses
- Steady Growth, Bayford, Deputy Minister; Aly's Alley, Alannan

John J. Tammaro Jr. (September 22, 1925 – February 25, 2001) was an American Thoroughbred racehorse trainer.

== Early life and riding career ==
Born in Baltimore, Maryland into a horse racing family, John Tammaro was still a young boy when his father died from injuries suffered in a racing accident at Belmont Park. His grandfather trained horses in Maryland, and as a teenager John Tammaro embarked on a career as a jockey. Between 1942 and 1956, he rode more than 1,000 winners at tracks in Maryland, West Virginia, and New Jersey but constant weight problems eventually forced him to give up riding and turn to training.

== Training career ==
John Tammaro along with King T. Leatherbury, Richard E. Dutrow, Sr. and Hall of Fame inductee Bud Delp became known as Maryland racing's "Big Four". They dominated racing in that state during the 1960s and '70s and helped modernize flat racing training. Tammaro also became one of the leading trainers at tracks elsewhere in the United States and Canada including Pimlico Race Course, Delaware Park, Monmouth Park, Calder Race Course, Gulfstream Park and Woodbine Racetrack.

In 1976 John Tammaro became the head trainer for Kinghaven Farms in King City, Ontario. He trained five Canadian Champions for Kinghaven, including the 1979 Queen's Plate winner Steady Growth and Deputy Minister, who was the 1981 U.S. Champion 2-Yr-Old Colt and Canadian Horse of the Year. As a result of his success with their horses, Kinghaven Farms was No.1 on the 1982 Canadian owners' list and earned that year's Sovereign Award for Outstanding Owner.

Kinghaven Farms had winter facilities in Ocala, Florida and when Tammaro left their employ in 1985, the then sixty-year-old went to live and work in the Miami area. Immediately successful, through nine straight race meets he finished either first or second in the training standings at the three area racetracks. In his career, Tammaro won more than 40 stakes races and in 1998 trained Aly's Alley to a second-place finish in the 1998 Breeders' Cup Juvenile. His success in Florida led to his induction into the Calder Race Course Hall of Fame in 1999.

== Death ==
On February 25, 2001, John Tammaro followed his usual routine. Early in the morning he left his residence in Pembroke Pines, Florida and drove the ten miles (16 km) to Gulfstream Park in Hallandale Beach to oversee his horses' morning workouts. After leaving the stable area around 10 a.m. he went missing and a search by police and family found no trace him. More than two months later on April 9, underwater divers doing maintenance for the South Florida Water Management District found Tammaro inside his Mercedes-Benz 420 at the bottom of the C-9 canal in Miramar, Florida, a waterway that runs from the Atlantic Ocean into the Everglades. The Broward County, Florida Medical Examiner's Office ruled his death was an accident.

Two of John Tammaro Jr.'s sons have followed in his footsteps. Son, Michael Tammaro also trained at Woodbine Racetrack where he won the 1986 Queen's Plate with Golden Choice. Son, John J. Tammaro III is also a successful trainer and nephew, Dean Sarvis is a jockey.
