= Canadian Derby =

Horse race held in Alberta, Canada

Coordinates: 53°33′58″N 113°27′30″W

- Class: Grade III
- Location: Century Mile Racetrack and Casino - Leduc County, Alberta (2019-present); Northlands Park - Edmonton, Alberta (1957-2018); Polo Park Racetrack - Winnipeg, Manitoba (1930-1956)
- Inaugurated: 1930
- Race type: Thoroughbred - flat racing
- Website: www.thehorses.com

Race information
- Distance: 1 1/4 miles (10 furlongs)
- Surface: Dirt
- Track: left-handed
- Qualification: Three-year-olds
- Weight: Assigned
- Purse: $200,000 (2022)

The Canadian Derby is a Canadian Thoroughbred horse race run annually at the Century Mile Racetrack and Casino in Leduc County, Alberta. A Grade III event held in August, it is open to three-year-old horses and is raced on dirt over a distance of one mile and a quarter (10 furlongs).

The race was the creation of future Canadian Horse Racing Hall of Fame inductee R. James Speers and first run in 1930 at his Polo Park Racetrack in Winnipeg, Manitoba. Inaugurated as the Manitoba Stakes, it was restricted to Manitoba-bred horses until 1936 when the race was renamed the Manitoba Derby and made open to three-year-old horses bred in Canada. In 1941, the name was changed again to its present form as the Canadian Derby. In 1942, future Canadian and U.S. Racing Hall of Fame jockey Johnny Longden won this race.

As the Canadian Derby grew in prestige and its purse money increased, top horses from Toronto and Montreal began coming west to compete in the race. In 1937 Goldlure won Canada's most prestigious race, the King's Plate. For owner Harry Hatch, trainer Bill Bringloe would later ship the colt 1,300 miles by rail transport from Toronto and win the Derby. Budpath, another King's Plate winner, won the 1941 edition of the Canadian Derby. However, not all eastern-based horses have fared so well. In 1942, Ten To Ace was shipped in from Toronto by leading owner/trainer Harry Giddings Jr. The colt had won the King's Plate as well as the Prince of Wales Stakes and according to Time magazine was being called "the greatest Canadian horse of all time." Ten To Ace finished in last place in the Canadian Derby.

In 1956, Polo Park Racetrack was closed and the race was moved to Northlands Park in Edmonton, Alberta. In 2019, the race moved to its present location at the Century Mile Racetrack and Casino south of Edmonton.

The Canadian Derby was contested at 1 mile from 1930 to 1933, 1 1/4 miles from 1934 to 1956, and 1 3/8 miles from 1957 until 2018. The race returned to 1 1/4 miles in 2019 when it was moved to Century Mile Racetrack.

In 2017, Chief Know It All finished first but the jockey of runner-up Double Bear filed a claim of interference. When the claim was rejected by track stewards the matter was appealed to the Alberta Horse Racing Appeal Tribunal which in July 2018 ruled in favour of the owner of Double Bear. An appeal of the Tribunal's order resulted in an August 2018 Court of Queen's Bench of Alberta ruling that Chief Know It All had interfered and declared Double Bear the winner.

Established in 2023, the Canadian Derby is the second jewel of the Western Canadian Triple Crown.

== Records ==
Most wins by a jockey:

- 6 - Rico Walcott (2010, 2013, 2014, 2017, 2018, 2022)

Most wins by an owner:

- 3 - Harry C. Hatch (1936, 1937, 1941)

== Winners of the Canadian Derby since 2006 ==
Year	Winner	Jockey	Trainer	Owner	Time
2026	Quarry	Damario Bynoe	Jerry Gourneau	Henry S. Witt Jr.	2:06.94
2025	Take Charge Tom	Rasheed Hughes	Robertino Diodoro	Randy Howg	2:03.99
2024	August Rain	Amadeo Perez	Barbara Heads	Peter Redekop	2:04.94
2023	Abeliefinthislivin	Amadeo Perez	Barbara Heads	Peter Redekop	2:03.00
2022	Great Escape	Rico Walcott	Robertino Diodoro	Arnold Bennewith et al.	2:01.35
2021	Uncharacteristic	Alexander Marti	Robert Van Overschot	Adam Isfeld	2:04.16
2020	Real Grace	Mauricio Malvaez	Shelley Brown	Brown, McEwen, Holtman and Bernell	2:03.77
2019	Explode (Note: Journeyman crossed the finish line first but was disqualified and placed second.)	Amadeo Perez	Mark Cloutier	Ole Nielsen	2:01.52
2018	Sky Promise	Rico Walcott	Robertino Diodoro	Wiest, Wiest, R 6 Stable & Tremblay	2:20.11
2017	Double Bear (Note: Chief Know It All crossed the finish line first, with Double Bear and Trooper John deadheating for second. The connections of Double Bear lodged a claim foul against Chief Know It All for interference in the stretch, however the racing stewards disallowed the claim of foul. The owner of Double Bear appealed to the Horse Racing Alberta Appeal Tribunal, who after three separate hearings, would rule that Double Bear had in fact been interfered with by Chief Know It All. The Tribunal moved both Double Bear and Trooper John into a tie for first, and placed Chief Know It All seventh. The owners of Chief Know It All appealed to the Alberta Court Of Queen's Bench. On August 13th, 2019, their appeal was dismissed. The Court also declared Double Bear to be the sole winner, thereby breaking the deadheat with Trooper John. The owners of Chief Know It All then appealed to the Alberta Court of Appeal, however their appeal was dismissed on November 23, 2020. The owners of Chief Know It All then sought leave to appeal to the Supreme Court of Canada, however their application for leave was dismissed with costs on May 13, 2021.)	Dane Nelson	Rodney Cone	Sycamore Stables	2:17.06
2016	Ready Intaglio	Shamaree Muir	Amber Meyaard	Robbin Martens	2:19.16
2015	Academic	Justin Stein	Tim Rycroft	Bear's Stable/Riversedge Racing Stables	2:18.49
2014	Edison	Rico Walcott	Robertino Diodoro	El Kardy/Fouad/ButzRunning Rabbit	2:21.38
2013	Broadway Empire	Rico Walcott	Robertino Diodoro	Butz/Howg/Running Rabbit	2:19.60
2012	Toccetive	Jorge Carreno	Joan Petrowski	Southview Ag	2:22.80
2011	Freedoms Traveller	Rafael Zenteno	Lianne Knechtel	Randy & Donna Feddema	2:21.80
2010	No Hesitation	Rico Walcott	Jim Meyaard	Barb Side	2:23.40
2009	Tommy Danzigger	Pedro Alvarado	Robert Gilker	Edgar B. Smith	2:23.00
2008	Matt's Broken Vow	Emile Ramsammy	Josie Carroll	Robert W. Mitchell	2:19.40
2007	Footprint	Real Simard	Joan Petrowski	Derek G. Milen et al.	2.19.60
2006	Shillelagh Slew	Dino Luciani	Michael DePaulo	David James	2:19.00

== Earlier winners ==
- 2005 - Alabama Rain
- 2004 - Organ Grinder
- 2003 - Raylene
- 2002 - Lady Shari
- 2001 - Fancy As
- 2000 - Scotman
- 1999 - Native Brass
- 1998 - A Fleet's Dancer
- 1997 - Smoky Cinder
- 1996 - Jan Alta
- 1995 - Sovacianto
- 1994 - Funboy
- 1993 - Cozzy Grey
- 1992 - Josh's Hero
- 1991 - Sounds Fabulous
- 1990 - Hurricane Benny
- 1989 - Haveigotadealforu
- 1988 - Elmtex
- 1987 - Steady Power
- 1986 - Slyly Gifted
- 1985 - Polynesian Flyer
- 1984 - Let's Go Blue
- 1983 - Victorious Lad
- 1982 - Exclusive Canadian
- 1981 - Frost King
- 1980 - Driving Home
- 1979 - All For Victory
- 1978 - Canadian Bill
- 1977 - Western Reason (Note: On February 22, 1978, the Alberta Supreme Court, Trial Division, allowed the appeal of the owner of R.J.'S Diamond from the Alberta Racing Commission, and reinstated R.J.'S Diamond as the winner of the race. There does not appear to be any Alberta Court of Appeal decision, which would be where any appeal of the reinstatement of R.J.'S Diamond as the winner would go.)
- 1976 - Laissez Passer
- 1975 - Pampas Host
- 1974 - Progressive Hope
- 1973 - Wing Span
- 1972 - Winning Red
- 1971 - Kim's Kid
- 1970 - Swinging Apache
- 1969 - Wyn D'Amour
- 1968 - Son Costume
- 1967 - Gilmore
- 1966 - Klondike Prince
- 1965 - Chariot Chaser
- 1964 - Quick Quick
- 1963 - Brother Leo
- 1962 - Western Morn
- 1961 - Galindo
- 1961 - General C
- 1960 - Count Lathum
- 1959 - Sonoma
- 1958 - Percy Yates
- 1957 - Spangled Jimmy
- 1956 - Argent
- 1955 - Loyalist
- 1954 - Treheme
- 1953 - Chain Reaction
- 1952 - Lord Strome
- 1951 - Beau Orage
- 1950 - Sir Strome
- 1949 - Yates Senior
- 1948 - Victory Gift
- 1947 - Sir Berrill
- 1946 - Palermo
- 1945 - Ferry Pilot
- 1944 - Gower Mon
- 1943 - Western Prince
- 1942 - Maginot Line
- 1941 - Budpath
- 1940 - Sir Trapseth
- 1939 - Larry Eckardt
- 1938 - Gowerlace
- 1937 - Goldlure
- 1936 - Sweepden
- 1935 - Nellie Quince
- 1934 - Caramar
- 1933 - Carhan Queen
- 1932 - Lady Marnock
- 1931 - Parisienne
- 1930 - Jack Whittier

== See also ==
- List of Canadian flat horse races
