= Manitoba Derby =

- Class: Nongraded stakes
- Location: Assiniboia Downs; Winnipeg, Manitoba, Canada
- Inaugurated: 1930
- Race type: Thoroughbred - Flat racing
- Website: www.assiniboiadowns.com/liveracing-mbderby.html

Race information
- Distance: 1 1/8 miles (9 furlongs)
- Surface: Dirt
- Track: left-handed
- Qualification: Three-years-old
- Weight: Scale weights, 121-fillies, 126-colts & geldings
- Purse: $125,000 CAD (2023)

The Manitoba Derby is a Canadian Thoroughbred horse race run annually at the beginning of August at Assiniboia Downs in Winnipeg, Manitoba, Canada. Established in 2023, it is the first jewel of the Western Canadian Triple Crown. A Listed Race for three-year-olds, it is contested on dirt over a distance of 1 1/8 miles (9 furlongs).

== Winners since 1998 ==
Year	Winner	Jockey	Trainer	Owner	Time
2025	Attack	N'Rico Prescod	Craig Smith	Smokin Guns Stable, Highfield Investment Group Inc, Lucky Diamonds Racing, Dialed In Racing Stable, Jamie Graham, Bruce Appleyard, James Bauder, Robert Bauder, John and Leslie O'Neill	1:53.93
2023	Mano Dura	Antonio Whitehall	Jerry Gourneau	Henry S. Witt Jr.	1:51.87
2022	Red Knobs	Jorge Carreno	Robertino Diodoro	Rob K. Nokes	1:50.80
2021	Uncharacteristic	Alexander Marti	Robert VanOverschot	Adam Isfeld	1:53.60
2020	Mongolian Wind	Wilmer Galviz	Wade Eno	Mongolian Stable & Andrew Stronach	1:54.00
2019	Oil Money	Orlando Mojica	Robertino Diodoro	Charles Garvey	1:54.60
2018	Sky Promise	Rico Walcott	Robertino Diodoro	Rick Wiest et al.	1:50.00
2017	Plentiful	Tyrone Nelson	Murray Duncan	Murray Duncan & Estate of Garylle B. Stewart	1:53.60
2016	Inside Straight	Scott Stevens	Robertino Diodoro	Randy Howg	1:52.60
2015	Flashy Jewel	Adolfo Morales	Clay Brinson	Lothenbach Stables, Inc.	1:52.80
2014	Street Prancer	Jalon Samuel	Steven Asmussen	Mike McCarty	1:54.80
2013	Assembly Hall	Alex Canchari	Bryan Porter	Bryan Porter & Dennis Goettsch	1:55.00
2012	Balooga Bull	Paul Nolan	Ardell Sayler	Paul Brandt	1:51.80
2011	Hammer's Bullet	Mark Anderson	Clay Brinson	Terry Hamilton	1:55.40
2010	Stachys	Eddie Martin, Jr.	Michael Biehler	Al Ulwelling & Bill Ulwelling	1:52.80
2009	Smuggler's Hold	Adolfo Morales	Rick Padilla	Bryan Porter	1:53.00
2008	Matt's Broken Vow	Alan Cuthbertson	Josie Carroll	Robert W. Mitchell	1:52.60
2007	Weather Warning	Paul Leacock	Marty Drexler	Shyman Farms	1:52.00
2006	Lord Kipling	Scott Stevens	Amber Blair	Center Hills Farm	1:53.40
2005	Prime Time T.V.	Travis Hightower	Bert Blake	Robert W. Mitchell	1:52.20
2004	Royalty Boy	Real Simard	Bruce Phelan	D. Antingham & D. Prop	1:52.00
2003	Hero's Pleasure	Scott Stevens	Doug Oliver	Jean D. Duke	1:53.40
2002	Lord Shogun	Quincy Welch	Robert Van Overschot	Canyon Farms	1:54.20
2001	Stage Classic	Constant Montpellier	David Cotey	Dominion Bloodstock et al.	1:51.80
2000	Scotman	Christopher McGregor	Pam McDougall	Lomar Stable/Scot Wilson	1:53.00
1999	Wafare Warrior	Frank Licata	Alex McPherson	Dominion Bloodstock et al.	1:54.40
1998	A Fleets Dancer	Real Simard	Roger Attfield	Cam Allard	1:52.60
1997	My Imperial Slew	Steven Bahen	Joseph Attard	J. R. Belanger	1:49.00

== Earlier Winners ==
- 1996 - Northernprospector
- 1995 - Langara Island
- 1994 - P.C.'s Bluff
- 1993 - Royal Frolic
- 1992 - Jan Artic
- 1991 - Plenty Chilly
- 1990 - Reancy
- 1989 - Rough Catch
- 1988 - No Malice
- 1987 - Steady Power
- 1986 - Steady Effort
- 1985 - Kamp Out
- 1984 - Ten Gold Pots
- 1983 - Gone to Royalty
- 1982 - Exclusive Canadian
- 1981 - Regimen
- 1980 - Country Free
- 1979 - Easters Memory
- 1978 - Overskate
- 1977 - Giboulee
- 1976 - Merry's Jay
