= Assiniboia Downs =

Horse-racing track in Manitoba, Canada

- Interactive map of Assiniboia Downs
- Location: 3975 Portage Ave. Winnipeg, Manitoba R3K 2E9; Canada
- Coordinates: 49°53′28″N 97°19′40″W
- Owned by: Manitoba Jockey Club
- Date opened: June 10, 1958; 68 years ago
- Capacity: 5,000
- Race type: Thoroughbred
- Course type: 6 1/2-furlong (4,300 ft; 1,300 m) flat racing
- Notable races: Assiniboia Gold Cup Stakes; Manitoba Derby; Winnipeg Futurity

Assiniboia Downs is a Canadian horse race track on 150 ha (360 acres) of land located in the Winnipeg suburb of St. James-Assiniboia. It is operated by the Manitoba Jockey Club and is the site of the annual Manitoba Derby.

The track is located on the western edge of the city, near the intersection of the Perimeter Highway and Portage Avenue. It was opened on June 10, 1958, replacing the former Polo Park Racetrack, which was demolished to make way for Polo Park Shopping Centre.

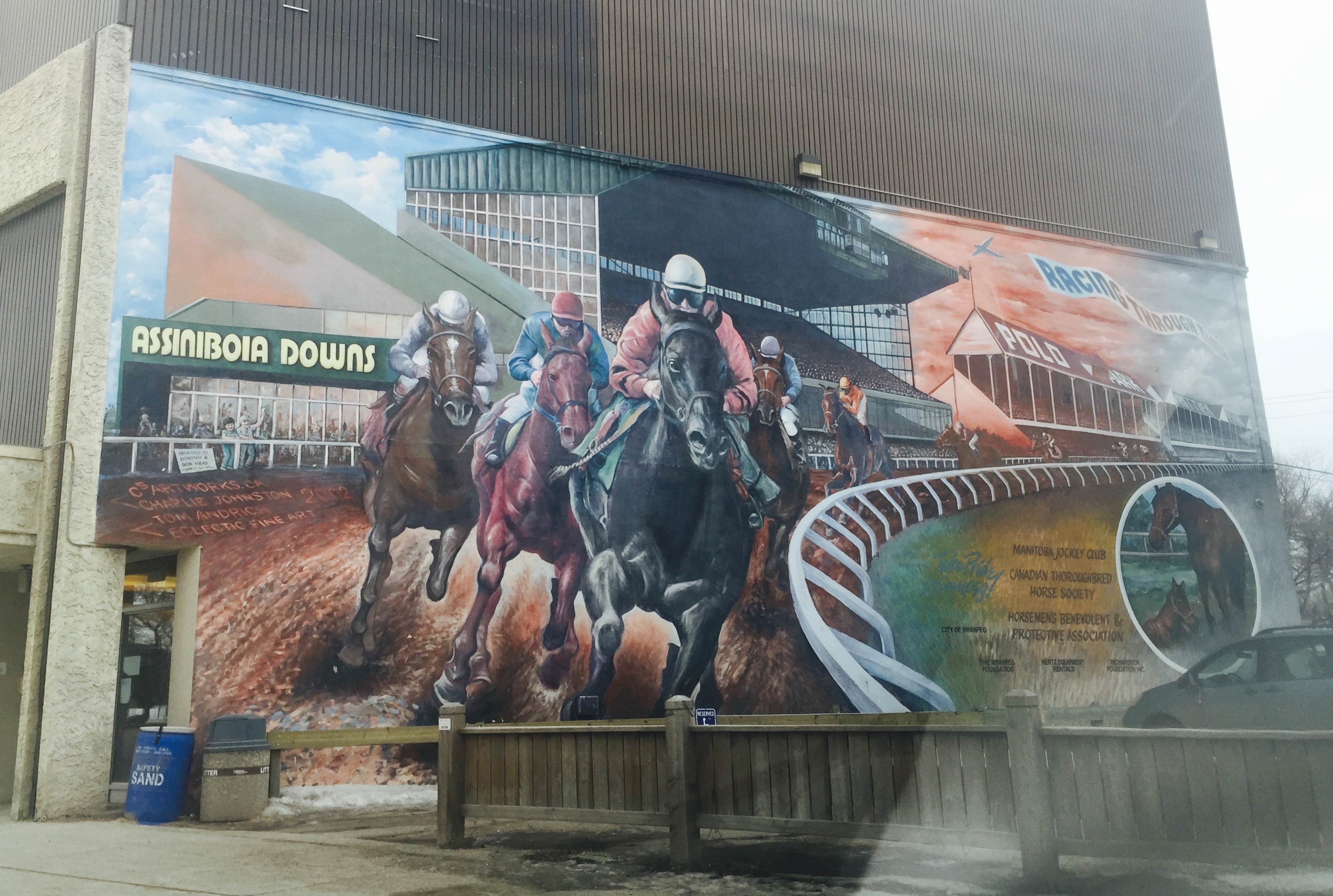
Assiniboia Downs mural (25239033942)

Thoroughbred racing season events run from May and end in September. Harness racing events operate during the winter months.

== History ==
Preparations were underway in September 1957 to construct a (est.) $4 million new horse racing venue in the Greater Winnipeg area, with seating capacity for 5,000 spectators. The width of the track would be 80 ft (24 m) with 6-furlong (4,000 ft; 1,200 m) and 1 1/8 furlongs (740 ft; 230 m) chutes. Assiniboia Downs would be located in the RM of Assiniboia at 3975 Portage Avenue. The racetrack took but seven weeks to complete construction.

Harness racers had shown an interest at using the new racetrack, and if they couldn't, would use one in St. Vital instead.

Construction of Assiniboia Downs would be completed in time for the beginning of the 1958 season in June, where 42 races would take place.

Assiniboia Downs installed a state-of-the-art "tote" machine at the new racing venue which displayed betting information in real-time.

Prior to the 2024 meeting, Assiniboia Downs announced they were eliminating run-up, a rarity in North American horse racing.

=== Off-track betting ===
In December 1987 Videon Cable-TV and Westman Cable's application to the CRTC to telecast live horse racing from Assiniboia Downs was approved. On January 23, 1988, Videon Cable-tv began telecasting Assiniboia Downs live harness racing to allow for off-track betting via telephone (Telephone Account Betting). Twenty phone lines were installed to handle incoming calls and they were frequently full. The signal was uplinked to the Anik C3 satellite. Initial telecasts on VSP-7 were a success, though Videon stated that on-air presentation between races could have been improved. Across the Red River, cable company Greater Winnipeg Cablevision did not telecast the harness racing and did not (initially) apply to the CRTC to do so.

Today the Assiniboia Downs Racing Network is available on MTS TV ch. 179 and 180 and on the Internet via the HPIbet website.

== Thoroughbred racing ==
Assiniboia Downs holds live racing on Mondays and Tuesdays for its entire meeting, with racing also on Wednesdays for the majority of the season. For 2024, daily overnight purses average $110,000, with a stakes schedule worth $1,439,000 for the season. Assiniboia begins the season with almost all sprint races. The premier race of the meeting is the Manitoba Derby, with a purse of $125,000. Assiniboia is considered a horseplayer friendly track with competitive takeout rates that were lowered for the 2024 season.

Assiniboia's 2023 season saw the second-highest handle in track history. Average wagering per race was $174,179, up 9.87% from 2022.
