= Jesse M. Campbell =

American jockey

Personal information
- Born: October 9, 1977 (age 48) Twinsburg, Ohio
- Occupation: Jockey

Horse racing career
- Sport: Horse racing
- Career wins: 2,179

Major racing wins
- Cornhusker Handicap (1998); Tejano Run Stakes (1999); Hanshin Cup Handicap (2000); Hawthorne Derby (2002); Robert F. Carey Memorial Handicap (2004, 2006); Lincoln Heritage Handicap (2005, 2007); Autumn Stakes (2011); Black Gold Stakes (2011); Mardi Gras Stakes (2011); Kennedy Road Stakes (2011); Royal North Stakes (2011); Lone Star Park Handicap (2012); Mineshaft Handicap (2012); New Orleans Handicap (2012); Vigil Stakes (2012); Bold Venture Stakes (2012); Bison City Stakes (2013, 2016); Dance Smartly Stakes (2013); Grey Stakes (2013); Jacques Cartier Stakes (2013); Nassau Stakes (2013, 2014); Coronation Futurity Stakes (2014); Royal North Stakes (2016); Ontario Colleen Stakes (2016); Wonder Where Stakes (2016) Canadian Classic Race wins: Queen's Plate (2013)

Significant horses
- Caren, Essence Hit Man, Midnight Aria

Jesse M. Campbell (born October 9, 1977) is an American Thoroughbred horse racing jockey who earned the biggest win of his career on July 7, 2013, in the $1 million Queen's Plate aboard Midnight Aria at Woodbine Racetrack in Toronto, Ontario. He is also the regular rider of 2016 Canadian Horse of the Year Caren.

The son of trainer Michael Campbell, Jesse has a twin brother, Joel, who is also a jockey.

Jesse Campbell began his professional riding career in 1995, winning his first race on July 20 at Arlington Park in Chicago. In 2011, Campbell made his homebase at Woodbine Racetrack and tied for tenth place in the jockey standings during his first season in which he won sixty races. On October 19, 2012, Campbell won five races on a single card at Woodbine Racetrack.

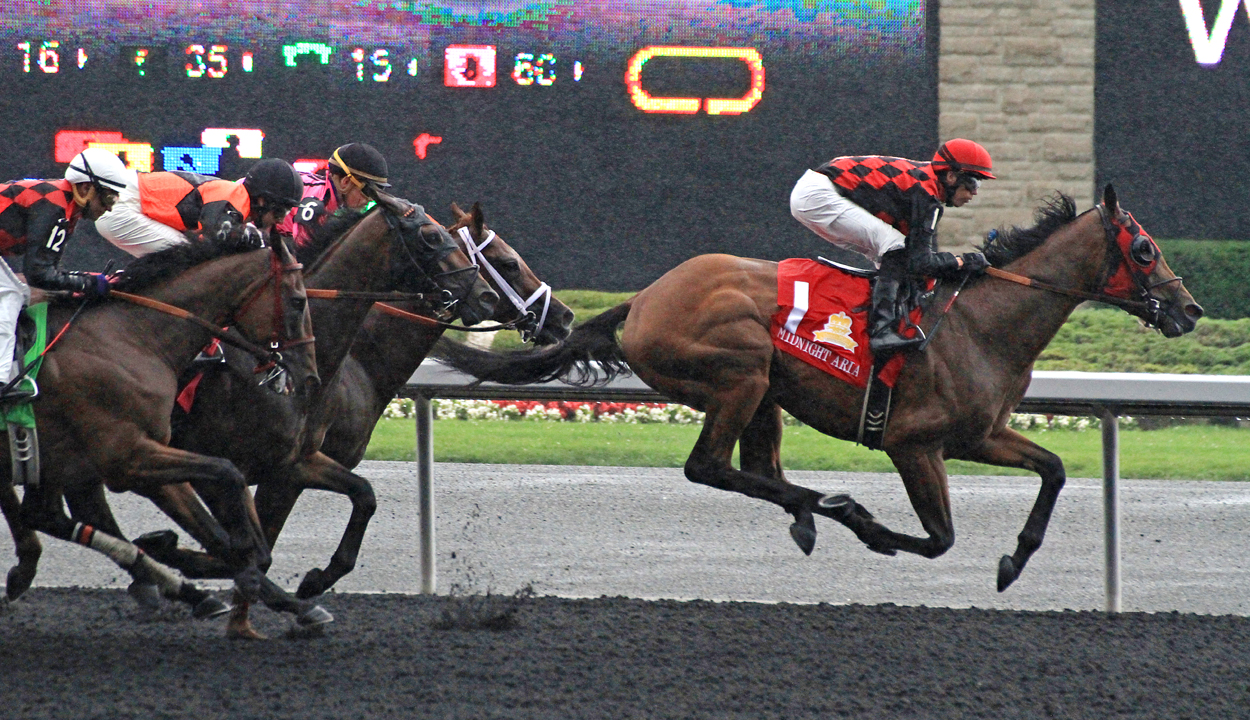
Jesse Campbell aboard 2013 Queen's Plate winner Midnight Aria

On October 23, 2016, Campbell won two stakes races at Woodbine on the same card despite staying up the night before watching the Chicago Cubs earn a place in the World Series. "This means so much because I grew up a Cubs fans going to games at Wrigley. I’m a Northsider for sure."

== Year-end charts ==
Chart (2004–present)	Peak position
National Earnings List for Jockeys 2004	87
National Earnings List for Jockeys 2005	56
National Earnings List for Jockeys 2006	78
National Earnings List for Jockeys 2007	89
National Earnings List for Jockeys 2008	86
National Earnings List for Jockeys 2011	59
National Earnings List for Jockeys 2012	42
National Earnings List for Jockeys 2013	35
National Earnings List for Jockeys 2014	43
National Earnings List for Jockeys 2015	72
