= Kinghaven Farms =

Coordinates: 43.912583°N 79.595073°W

Kinghaven Farms Limited
- Company type: Private
- Industry: Equine
- Founded: 1967
- Founder: Donald G. "Bud" Willmot
- Headquarters: 4305 King Road; King City, Ontario, Canada
- Key people: David S. Willmot (President)
- Services: Horse breeding and racing
- Website: kinghavenfarms.com

Kinghaven Farms is a horse racing stable that was founded in 1967 by Donald G. "Bud" Willmot. Located in King City, Ontario, north of Toronto, the success of the stable would see it expand to the United States with the acquisition of a 660-acre (2.7 km^{2}) farm and training center near Ocala, Florida. In 1974, Bud's son David S. Willmot began managing the farm's racing/breeding programs. In 2004, David Willmot announced that Kinghaven was shutting down its Thoroughbred operation, although he would continue to race a handful of horses in the following years.

== History ==
Kinghaven Farms Limited is a horse breeding and racing farm founded in 1967 by Donald G. "Bud" Willmot. Located in King City, Ontario, Kinghaven became a father/son operation in 1974 when Bud's son and current president David Willmot began managing the farm's Thoroughbred racing/breeding programs. One of the most decorated racing stables in Canadian history, Kinghaven won Canada's most prestigious horse race, the Queen's Plate, on five occasions.

John J. Tammaro, Jr. was head trainer from 1976 to 1985. He conditioned five Canadian Champions for Kinghaven, including the 1979 Queen's Plate winner Steady Growth and U.S. Champion 2-Yr-Old Colt Deputy Minister.

Roger Attfield succeeded Tammaro as trainer in 1985. En route to being inducted into the Canadian Horse Racing Hall of Fame, Attfield won numerous prestigious races for Kinghaven, including four editions of the Queen's Plate, and he trained many Champions.

Since inception, Kinghaven Farms has bred or raced more than 150 stakes race winners, including back-to-back Canadian Triple Crown champions With Approval and Izvestia in 1989 and 1990. At its peak, Kinghaven Farms had 200 horses, including nearly 80 broodmares, and owned syndicate shares in close to two dozen top stallions standing at Kentucky stud farms. It operated four farms – two in King City, Ontario, one in Ocala, Florida, and one in Lexington, Kentucky. Throughout this entire period, Ian Black served as Farm Manager and was a crucial element in Kinghaven's success.

Bud Willmot was inducted into the Canadian Horse Racing Hall of Fame in 1991. David Willmot was inducted into the Hall of Fame in 2005.

Following Bud's death in 1994, David assumed sole ownership. Kinghaven continued to produce champions and stakes winners until 2011, but during this time, the farm's operations were scaled back significantly due to David's management responsibilities at the Ontario Jockey Club/Woodbine Entertainment Group; he was president and CEO from 1995 to 2010, then chairman from 2001 to 2012. During his tenure, Woodbine Entertainment Group invested approximately $400 million in upgrading its facilities and technology, and it paid over $2 billion in purse money.

To this day, Kinghaven Farms remains a family-run business. With David's wife Susan, and son Jay, serving as Vice Presidents, the farm has begun expanding its business into multiple areas, including renewable energy and apiculture. Kinghaven maintains its roots in the equine industry through Standardbred breeding and ownership, where it has owned, in partnership, champions Southwind Allaire, Cabrini Hanover and Solar Sister.

== Notable horses ==
Notable horses that were owned or bred by Kinghaven include:

- Steady Growth - 1979 Queen's Plate winner
- Deputy Minister - 1981 Canadian Horse of the Year, champion 2-year-old in both Canada and the United States
- Summer Mood, champion sprinter of 1985
- Carotene, winner of six Sovereign Awards from 1986 to 1988
- Market Control - 1987 Queen's Plate winner
- Play the King - 1988 Canadian Horse of the Year
- With Approval, 1989 Canadian Horse of the Year and Triple Crown winner
- Izvestia - 1990 Canadian Horse of the Year and Triple Crown winner
- Alydeed - 1992 Queen's Plate winner, second in the Preadness Stakes
- Alywow - 1994 Canadian Horse of the Year

== Employee fraud at Kinghaven Farms ==
On February 20, 2007, Kinghaven Farms' bookkeeper, Christiane Krohn, turned herself in to police to face fraud-related charges stemming from allegations that she stole more than $500,000 from the organization over a period of 7 years. She appeared before the Ontario Court of Justice in Newmarket on March 29, 2007, and was sentenced to 15 months in prison.

== See also ==
- Hill 'n' Dale Farms
