= Chris Loseth =

Canadian jockey

Personal information
- Born: 1955 (age 70–71) Banff, Alberta, Canada
- Occupation: Jockey

Horse racing career
- Sport: Horse racing
- Career wins: 3,668

Major racing wins
- Longacres Mile Handicap (1984, 1997); Canadian Derby (1989); BC Premier's Handicap (1991, 2000); British Columbia Oaks (1995, 1996, 1997, 1999, 2001); British Columbia Derby (1996, 1998); Gottstein Futurity (1996); Ballerina Stakes (1997, 2001)

Racing awards
- Sovereign Award for Outstanding Apprentice Jockey (1976); Sovereign Award for Outstanding Jockey (1984); Avelino Gomez Memorial Award (2001)

Honours
- British Columbia Horse Racing Hall of Fame (1992); Canadian Horse Racing Hall of Fame (2007); Chris Loseth Handicap at Hastings Racecourse

Significant horses
- Delta Colleen, Travelling Victor; Kid Katabatic, Police Inspector

Chris Loseth (born 1955 in Banff, Alberta) is a Canadian Thoroughbred horse racing jockey. At age six, Loseth's family moved to Fort Nelson, British Columbia then in the year before he graduated high school they resettled in Grand Forks. As a boy he was inspired by the success of the great Alberta jockey, Johnny Longden. After finishing high school, in 1974 Loseth began an apprenticeship at Hastings Racecourse in Vancouver, British Columbia that saw him go on to compete in more than 26,000 races. He retired on June 12, 2005, having won more races and stakes events than any other jockey in the one hundred and sixteen-year history of Hastings Racecourse.

In 1976, Chris Loseth was voted the Sovereign Award as Canada's Outstanding Apprentice Jockey. During his career, he was the Champion rider at Hastings Racecourse a record eight times and in 1984 earned another Sovereign Award as his country's Outstanding Jockey. In 2001, he was voted the Avelino Gomez Memorial Award, an honour given to a jockey who has made significant contributions to the sport of Thoroughbred racing in Canada.

== North American record ==
Chris Loseth competed at racetracks along the Pacific coast of Canada and the United States. He had five wins in one day at California's Golden Gate Fields and won six races on three occasions (1974, 1976, 1994), doing it twice in Vancouver and once at Longacres Racetrack in Renton, Washington. On April 9, 1984, Loseth equaled the North American record for most wins in one day when he won eight races on a single racecard at Hastings Racecourse.

In 1992, Chris Loseth was inducted in the British Columbia Horse Racing Hall of Fame and in 2007 in the Canadian Horse Racing Hall of Fame. The Chris Loseth Handicap for three-year-old horses at Hastings Racecourse was named in his honour.

Following his retirement from racing in 2005, he has remained in the industry and is now a trainer with Canmor Farms in Aldergrove, British Columbia.
