= Canadian Champion Sprint Horse =

The Canadian Champion Sprint Horse was a Canadian Thoroughbred horse racing honour that was part of the Sovereign Awards program awarded annually to the top Thoroughbred of either sex competing in sprint races in Canada. Created in 1980 by the Jockey Club of Canada as a single award, in 2009 it was split to become a separate award for the Canadian Champion Male Sprint Horse and for the Canadian Champion Female Sprint Horse.

== Winners ==
- 1980 : La Voyageuse
- 1981 : Eternal Search
- 1982 : Avowal
- 1983 : Fraud Squad
- 1984 : Diapason
- 1985 : Summer Mood
- 1986 : New Connection
- 1987 : Play the King
- 1988 : Play the King
- 1989 : Mr. Hot Shot
- 1990 : Twist the Snow
- 1991 : King Corrie
- 1992 : King Corrie
- 1993 : Apeilia
- 1994 : King Ruckus
- 1995 : Scotzanna
- 1996 : Langfuhr
- 1997 : Glanmire
- 1998 : Deputy Inxs
- 1999 : Deputy Inxs
- 2000 : One Way Love
- 2001 : Mr. Epperson
- 2002 : Wake at Noon
- 2003 : Soaring Free
- 2004 : Blonde Executive
- 2005 : Judiths Wild Rush
- 2006 : Judiths Wild Rush
- 2007 : Financingavailable
- 2008 : Fatal Bullet
