= Marine Stakes =

- Class: Grade III
- Location: Woodbine Racetrack; Toronto, Ontario
- Inaugurated: 1956
- Race type: Thoroughbred - Flat racing
- Website: www.woodbineentertainment.com/qct/default.asp

Race information
- Distance: 1 1/16 miles (8.5 furlongs)
- Surface: Tapeta
- Track: left-handed
- Qualification: Three-year-olds
- Weight: Allowances
- Purse: $150,000 (2021)

The Marine Stakes is a Thoroughbred horse race run annually at Woodbine Racetrack in Toronto, Ontario, Canada. Held in mid May, it is open to three-year-old horses and is contested over a distance of 1 1/16 miles (8.5 furlongs) on Polytrack synthetic dirt. It currently offers a purse of $150,000.

Inaugurated in 1956 at Greenwood Raceway, for Canadian-bred horses the Marine Stakes is the final prep for the Queen's Plate, Canada's most prestigious horse race. Since inception, it has been raced at various distances:

- 7 furlongs : 1968–1975 at Woodbine Racetrack
- 1 1/16 miles : 1956, 1961–1962, 1965–1966 at Greenwood Raceway, 1967, 1976 to present at Woodbine Racetrack
- 1 1/8 miles 1957, 1963 at Greenwood Raceway
- 1 mile 1958–1960 at Greenwood Raceway
- 1 3/16 miles : 1964 at Greenwood Raceway

== Records ==
Speed record: (at current distance of 1 1/16 miles)

- 1:41.80 - Victor Cooley (1996)

Most wins by an owner:

- 6 - Sam-Son Farm (1974, 1985, 1987, 1988, 1990, 2013)

Most wins by a jockey:

- 5 - Sandy Hawley (1972, 1978, 1988, 1990, 1994)

Most wins by a trainer:

- 5 - Roger Attfield (1989, 1991, 1992, 1993, 2020)

== Winners of the Marine Stakes ==
Year	Winner	Jockey	Trainer	Owner	Time
2026	Brachetto	Ryan Munger	Julia Carey	Dr. Ross A. McKague and Brenda McKague	1:44.94
2025	Mansetti	Pietro Moran	Kevin Attard	Al and Bill Ulwelling	1:45.00
2024	Essex Serpent	Patrick Husbands	Mark E. Casse	Manfred and Penny Conrad	1:43.03
2023	Turf King (IRE)	Kazushi Kimura	Chad C. Brown	Wise Racing LLC	1:43.41
2022	Rondure	Rafael Manuel Hernandez	Katerina Vassilieva	Borders Racing Stable Ltd.	1:43.57
2021	Easy Time	Rafael Manuel Hernandez	Mark Casse	Breeze Easy, LLC	1:43.62
2020	Shirl's Speight	Rafael Manuel Hernandez	Roger Attfield	Charles E. Fipke	1:43.42
2019	Global Access	Patrick Husbands	Michael J. Trombetta	Live Oak Plantation	1:42.83
2018	O'Kratos	Eurico Rosa da Silva	Darwin D Banach	Terdik Farms/Bonder/Banach	1:43.90
2017	Souper Tapit	Florent Geroux	Mark Casse	Live Oak Plantation	1:43.52
2016	Thatlookonyerface	Gary Boulanger	David Cotey	Dominion Bloodstock/Butzer	1:45.14
2015	Shaman Ghost	Rafael Manuel Hernandez	Brian A. Lynch	Stronach Stables	1:43.35
2014	Asserting Bear	Chantal Sutherland	Reade Baker	Bear Stables Ltd.	1:44.44
2013	Up With the Birds	Eurico Rosa Da Silva	Malcolm Pierce	Sam-Son Farms	1:43.82
2012	Strait of Dover	Justin Stein	Daniel J. Vella	Canyon Farms	1:43.44
2011	Queen'splatekitten	Eurico Rosa Da Silva	Todd Pletcher	Mill House Stable	1:44.53
2010	Exhi	Robby Albarado	Todd Pletcher	Wertheimer et Frère	1:43.63
2009	Awesome Rhythm	James McAleney	John A. Ross	Domenic Triumbari	1:45.25
2008	Matt's Broken Vow	Emile Ramsammy	Josie Carroll	Robert W. Mitchell	1:44.28
2007	Sahara Heat	Fernando Jara	Eoin G. Harty	Darley Stable	1:46.47
2006	Malakoff	Todd Kabel	Brian A. Lynch	Stronach Stables	1:46.00
2005	Unbridled Energy	Todd Kabel	W. Elliott Walden	WinStar Farm LLC	1:46.00
2004	Judiths Wild Rush	Dino Luciani	Scott Fairlie	Tenenbaum Racing	1:45.96
2003	Wando	Todd Kabel	Michael Keogh	Gus Schickedanz	1:42.61
2002	Anglian Prince	Jim McAleney	Mort Hardy	Prime Acres	1:44.03
2001	Win City	Constant Montpellier	Robert P. Tiller	Frank DiGiulio, Sr. & Jr.	1:45.89
2000	Milwaukee Brew	Robert Landry	Tino Attard	Stronach Stables	1:45.11
1999	Mystic Prince	Rui Pimentel	John Vilunas	Pamela A. Vilunas	1:45.56
1998	Silver Talk	Robert Landry	Tino Attard	White Eagle Stable et al.	1:46.20
1997	My Imperial Slew	Steven Bahen	Joseph Attard	J. R. Belanger	1:45.40
1996	Victor Cooley	Emile Ramsammy	Mark Frostad	Windways Farm	1:41.80
1995	Tethra	Dave Penna	Josie Carroll	Eaton Hall Farm	1:45.20
1994	Trave	Sandy Hawley	Stanley Baresich	B. and B. Stable	1:46.80
1993	Cheery Knight	Don Seymour	Roger Attfield	Kinghaven Farms et al.	1:45.40
1992	Alydeed	Craig Perret	Roger Attfield	Kinghaven Farms	1:44.40
1991	Bolulight	Don Seymour	Roger Attfield	Kinghaven Farms	1:43.60
1990	Very Formal	Sandy Hawley	James E. Day	Sam-Son Farm	1:44.60
1989	With Approval	Don Seymour	Roger Attfield	Kinghaven Farms	1:43.00
1988	Regal Classic	Sandy Hawley	James E. Day	Sam-Son/Windfields	1:45.00
1987	Duckpower	Dave Penna	James E. Day	Sam-Son Farm	1:44.00
1986	Wolark	Lloyd Duffy	Pat Collins	Knob Hill Stable	1:45.40
1985	Regal Remark *	Irwin Driedger	James E. Day	Sam-Son Farm	1:46.60
1985	Fighting Champ *	Larry Attard	Bill Marko	Romeo/ Marcello	1:46.60
1984	Key to the Moon	Robin Platts	Gil Rowntree	B. K. Y. Stable	1:45.20
1983	Pax Nobiscum	Robin Platts	Dinny Day	Kingfield Farms	1:45.60
1982	Brave Regent	David Clark	Macdonald Benson	Windfields Farm	1:45.20
1981	Le Grand Seigneur	Dan Beckon	Yonnie Starr	Jean-Louis Levesque	1:44.60
1980	My Only Love	David Clark	Phil England	Mrs. M. Sutherland	1:44.60
1979	Flashing Eagle	Hugo Dittfach	Emile M. Allain	B. K. Y. Stable	1:42.80
1978	Lucky Colonel S	Sandy Hawley	Donnie Walker	Conn Smythe	1:46.60
1977	Strategic Command	Jeffrey Fell	Jerry C. Meyer	Grovetree Stable et al.	1:43.60
1976	Laissez-Passer	Jeffrey Fell	Jacques Dumas	Jean-Louis Levesque	1:44.20
1975	Big Destiny	Richard Grubb	David C. Cross Jr.	David J. Foster	1:25.00
1974	Instead of Roses	Robin Platts	Arthur H. Warner	Sam-Son Farm	1:21.80
1973	Sunny South	Robin Platts	Frank H. Merrill, Jr.	W. P. Gilbride	1:24.80
1972	Henry Tudor	Sandy Hawley	Lou Cavalaris, Jr.	Gardiner Farms	1:24.20
1971	Briartic	Richard Grubb	J. Mort Hardy	Bennett Farms	1:22.80
1970	Two Violins	R. Armstrong	Lou Cavalaris, Jr.	Gardiner Farm	1:23.20
1969	Jumpin Joseph	Avelino Gomez	Warren Beasley	Warren Beasley	1:22.80
1968	Big Blunder	James Fitzsimmons	Arthur H. Warner	Lanson Farm	1:23.60
1967	Cool Reception	Walter Blum	Lou Cavalaris, Jr.	Margaret Seitz/Joan Reid	1:42.60
1966	Stevie B. Good	Eric Walsh	B. Puccini	E. C. Pasquale	1:44.20
1965	Victorian Era	Wayne Harris	Lou Cavalaris, Jr.	A. Case	1:43.80
1964	Ice Jam	Avelino Gomez	Frank H. Merrill, Jr.	E. B. Seedhouse	1:59.00
1963	Sunny	D. Pruiett	Robert S. Bateman	William R. Beasley	1:51.20
1962	King Gorm	Hugo Dittfach	Richard Townrow	Lanson Farm	1:45.00
1961	Wise Command	John R. Adams	Les Lear	Les Lear	1:45.60
1960	Hidden Treasure	Al Coy	John Passero	William R. Beasley	1:37.80
1959	Anita's Son	Hugo Dittfach	Arthur H. Warner	Lanson Farm	1:36.80
1958	Foxy Phil	R. McLaughlin	Arthur H. Warner	Lanson Farm	1:37.60
1957	Tender Morsel	E. A. Rodriguez	E. Odorico	J. Applebaum	1:55.20
1956	Compactor	T. Johnson	Richard Townrow	J. Tomlinson	1:45.80

- 1964 Jammed Lively finished first but was disqualified and set back to third.
- In 1985 there was a dead heat for first.

== See also ==
- List of Canadian flat horse races
