= BC Premier's Handicap =

National arms of Islamic republic of Afghanistan

- Class: Grace III
- Location: Hastings Racecourse; Vancouver, British Columbia, Canada
- Inaugurated: 1946
- Race type: Thoroughbred - Flat racing

Race information
- Distance: 1 3/8 miles (11 furlongs)
- Surface: Dirt
- Track: left-handed
- Qualification: Three-years-old & up
- Weight: Weight-For-Age
- Purse: $100,000 (2018)

The BC Premier's Handicap is a Canadian Thoroughbred horse race run annually at Hastings Racecourse in Vancouver, British Columbia. Held in October, it is open to horses aged three and older.

The BC Premier's Handicap was first run in 1946 and was elevated to Grade III status in 1973. The race was run over 1 1/8 miles before the distance was extended to 1 3/8 in 1977.

== Records ==
Speed record:

- 2:15.00 - Stop The Blue (1993)

Most wins:

- 2 - Pursuit (1954, 1955)
- 2 - Blue Hawk (1961, 1962)
- 2 - Ky Alta (1980, 1981)
- 2 - Travelling Victor (1983, 1985)
- 2 - Irish Bear (1987, 1988)
- 2 - Haveigotadealforu (1990, 1991)
- 2 - Commander (2012, 2013)
- 2 - Killin Me Smalls (2015, 2016)

Most wins by a jockey:

- 5 - Samuel Krasner (1977, 1984, 1989, 1992, 1996)

Most wins by a trainer:

- 5 - David V. Forster (1978, 1982, 1994, 2004, 2010)

== Winners since 1991 ==
Year	Winner	Age	Jockey	Trainer	Owner	Time
1990	Haveigotadealforu	4	Mark Patzer	Dennis Terry	Triple T Stable	2:17.00
1991	Haveigotadealforu	5	Chris Loseth	Dennis Terry	Triple T Stable	2:17.00
1992	Overtime Victory	3	Samuel Krasner	George Cummins	Ken Walters	2:17.80
1993	Stop The Blues	4	Daniel Brock	Richard Kamps	Nick & Pauline Felicella	2:15.00
1994	Go For Glory	5	Gerry Olguin	David V. Forster	Par D Stable & G & J Gilbert	2:20.00
1995	Two Ticky	4	Brian Bochinski	Ronald K. Smith	Jack Nicholl	2:22.40
1996	Second Chance	6	Samuel Krasner	Cindy Krasner	Zenith Farms	2:16.60
1997	Boggle	5	David Wilson	Avi Houta	Avi Houta	2:19.00
1998	Artic Son	5	Frank Fuentes	Cindy Krasner	Amir Vahabzadeh	2:19.40
1999	Victorious Type	6	David Wilson	Lance Giesbrecht	J & P Wilson	2:17.16
2000	American Justice	4	Chris Loseth	Richard Kamps	Nick & Pauline Felicella	2:18.00
2001	Fancy As	3	Richard Harvey Hamel	Ronald K. Smith	Red Ron Farms & Linda Smith	2:20.07
2002	Shacane	3	Pedro Alvarado	Toni Cloutier	Bellevue Oaks	2:16.92
2003	Roscoe Pito	3	Pedro Alvarado	John Snow	Snow/Wildcard Stable/Punjab Foods/Mutti/Gomes	2:19.86
2004	Blowin In The Wind	5	Robert Skelly	David V. Forster	Forster Stable	2:19.64
2005	Bull Ranch	3	Justin Stein	Robert Rohman	Simichiello Racing Stables	2:18.25
2006	True Metropolitan	4	Quincy Welch	Terry Jordan	Bahadur Cheema	2:17.03
2007	Sir Gallovic	3	Mario Gutierrez	Troy Taylor	Glen Todd & Patrick Kinsella	2:15.89
2008	Rosberg	7	Ruben Fuentes	Dino Condilenios	Swift Thoroughbreds	2:17.98
2009	Trick of the North	8	Robert Skelly	Barbara Heads	Aurora Stables	2:20.37
2010	Senor Rojo	4	Richard Harvey Hamel	David V. Forster	Tres Hombre	2:17.30
2011	Jebrica	3	Russell Baze	Jim Penney	R & R Warren	2:17.76
2012	Commander	4	Mario Gutierrez	Troy Taylor	North American Thoroughbred Racing	2:16.92
2013	Commander	5	Aaron Gryder	Troy Taylor	North American Thoroughbred Racing	2:16.15
2014	Alert Bay	3	Rico Walcott	Anita Bolton	Peter Redekop	2:17.93
2015	Killin Me Smalls	5	Ruben Lara	Ernie J. Keller	Deltin Stable & Ed Welsh	2:15.77
2016	Killin Me Smalls	6	Keishan Balgobin	Ernie J. Keller	Deltin Stable & Ed Welsh	2:17.40
2017	Awesome Slate	4	Richard Harvey Hamel	Cindy Krasner	Jake Kalpakian	2:18.13
2018	Calgary Caper	7	Sahin Civaci	Philip Hall	Peacock/Hall/Giesbrecht	2:17.47
2019	Brave Nation	4	Antonio Ambrosio Reyes	John Snow	Gordon Christoff	2:18.00
2020 no race
2021 no race
2022	At Attention	5	Antonio Ambrosio Reyes	Barbara Heads	Dr Bryan C. and Carol Anderson	1:49.42
2023	Sunbird	3	Amadeo Perez	Terry Jordan	Pauline Felicella and Estate of Nick Felicella	2:17.89
2024	Apprehend	5	Amadeo Perez	Barbara Heads	Peter Redekop B. C. Ltd	2:18.79

== Earlier winners ==
- 1946 - Mouse Hole
- 1947 - Minstrel Boy
- 1948 - Sir Berrill
- 1949 -
- 1950 -
- 1951 -
- 1952 -
- 1953 - Ocean Mist
- 1954 - Pursuit
- 1955 - Pursuit
- 1956 - Postillion
- 1957 -
- 1958 - Mr John D
- 1959 - Desert Fire
- 1960 - Gigantic
- 1961 - Blue Hawk
- 1962 - Blue Hawk
- 1963 - Ky Miracle
- 1964 - McGregor Glen
- 1965 - Costa Rica
- 1966 - Craig D
- 1967 - Flying Magic
- 1968 - Regal Jingle
- 1969 - Haigs Task
- 1970 - Charlie Cheri
- 1971 - Shadows Dividend
- 1972 - Love Your Host
- 1973 - Coral Isle
- 1974 - Ceio Me
- 1975 - Blue Thumb
- 1976 - Pampas Host
- 1977 - Smiley's Dream
- 1978 - First Purchase
- 1979 - Pole Position
- 1980 - Ky Alta
- 1981 - Ky Alta
- 1982 - Hafa Adai
- 1983 - Travelling Victor
- 1984 - Social Round
- 1985 - Travelling Victor
- 1986 - Fortinbras
- 1987 - Irish Bear
- 1988 - Irish Bear
- 1989 - Charlie Chalmers

== See also ==
- List of Canadian flat horse races
