= Regal Intention =

Canadian-bred Thoroughbred racehorse

- Sire: Vice Regent
- Grandsire: Northern Dancer
- Dam: Tiffany Tam
- Damsire: Tentam
- Sex: Stallion
- Foaled: 1985
- Country: Canada
- Colour: Dark Bay
- Breeder: Sam-Son Farm
- Owner: Sam-Son Farm; Sam-Son Farm & Windfields Farm (1989)
- Trainer: James E. Day
- Record: 41: 14-7-10
- Earnings: $1,083,103

Major wins
- Kingarvie Stakes (1987); Achievement Stakes (1988); Queenston Stakes (1988); Victoria Park Stakes (1988); British Columbia Derby (1988); Nearctic Stakes (1989); Shepperton Stakes (1989); Jacques Cartier Stakes (1990) Canadian Classic Race wins: Queen's Plate (1988)

Awards
- Canadian Champion 3-year-old Colt (1988)

Regal Intention (1985–2008) is a Canadian Champion Thoroughbred racehorse.

== Background ==
A grandson of Northern Dancer, he was out of the mare Tiffany Tam and sired by Vice Regent who also sired his stablemate and arch rival, Regal Classic.

Regal Intention was owned and bred by Sam-Son Farm and trained by James E. Day, a former Olympic equestrian show jumping Gold medallist.

== Racing career ==
Based at Woodbine Racetrack in Toronto, at age two the colt made eight starts, winning three including the Kingarvie Stakes. His main rival, Regal Classic, would be voted Canadian Champion 2-Yr-Old-Colt.

In 1988, Regal Intention was the dominant three-year-old horse in Canada. He won seven of his twelve starts, capturing the British Columbia Derby at Hastings Racecourse in Vancouver and important stakes races at Woodbine Racetrack in Toronto including a win over Regal Classic in Canada's most prestigious race, the Queen's Plate. In the Prince of Wales Stakes at Fort Erie Racetrack, the two colts ran one-two again but this time Regal Classic came out on top by a nose. Nonetheless, Regal Intention's 1988 performances earned him Canadian Champion 3-year-old Colt honors.

Sent back to the track to compete at age four, Windfields Farm acquired an interest in Regal Intention. He raced thirteen times in 1989, frequently running in sprint races. He won three races, including the Nearctic Stakes at Woodbine, but in the Breeders' Cup Sprint at Gulfstream Park the colt Sam Who was disqualified to last after he angled in causing considerable difficulty for several horses that forced another horse to run into Regal Intention. He never recovered and finished eleventh in the thirteen-horse field behind upset winner, Dancing Spree.

At age five, Regal Intention made eight starts with his single win coming in the Jacques Cartier Stakes at Woodbine Racetrack.

== Stud record ==
Retired after the 1990 season, Regal Intention entered stud the following year. Now owned by Regal Intention Partnership, he currently stands at Canmor Farms in Aldergrove, British Columbia. As at the end of 2007, he has sired twenty-eight stakes winners. Among his offspring is the filly Woolloomooloo who in 1997 was voted the Sovereign Award for Champion Older Female Horse and Sovereign Award for Champion Female Turf Horse.

Regal Intention was standing at Canmor Farm in Aldergrove, British Columbia when he was found dead on October 25 in his paddock. The twenty-three-year-old died from apparent natural causes.
