= List of Canadian flat horse races =

A list of notable flat horse races which take place annually in Canada and which currently hold Grade 1, 2 or 3 according to the Jockey Club of Canada.

== Grade 1 ==
Month	Race Name	Racecourse	Dist. (f)	Age/Sex
September	Woodbine Mile	Woodbine	8	3yo+
September	Northern Dancer Turf Stakes	Woodbine	12	3yo+
September	Natalma Stakes	Woodbine	8	2yo f
September	Summer Stakes	Woodbine	8	2yo
October	E. P. Taylor Stakes	Woodbine	10	3yo+ f
October	Canadian International Stakes	Woodbine	10	3yo+

== Grade 2 ==
Month	Race Name	Racecourse	Dist. (f)	Age/Sex
May	Eclipse Stakes	Woodbine	8.5	4yo+
June	Nassau Stakes (Canada)	Woodbine	8	3yo+ f
June	Connaught Cup Stakes	Woodbine	7	4yo+
June	Highlander Stakes	Woodbine	6	3yo+
June/July	King Edward Stakes	Woodbine	8	3yo+
July	Dance Smartly Stakes	Woodbine	10	3yo+ f
July	Nijinsky Stakes	Woodbine	12	3yo+
August	Play the King Stakes	Woodbine	7	3yo+
August	Sky Classic Stakes	Woodbine	11	3yo+
August	Royal North Stakes	Woodbine	6	3yo+ f
September	Canadian Stakes	Woodbine	3	3yo+ f
October	Nearctic Stakes	Woodbine	6	3yo+
November	Bessarabian Stakes	Woodbine	7	3yo+ f
November	Kennedy Road Stakes	Woodbine	6	3yo+

== Grade 3 ==
Month	Race Name	Racecourse	Dist. (m)	Age/Sex
April	Whimsical Stakes	Woodbine	6	4yo+ f
May	Marine Stakes	Woodbine	8.5	3yo
May	Hendrie Stakes	Woodbine	6.5	4yo+ f
May	Selene Stakes	Woodbine	8.5	3yo f
May	Jacques Cartier Stakes	Woodbine	6	4yo+
June	Trillium Stakes	Woodbine	8.5	3yo+ f
June	Singspiel Stakes	Woodbine	12	3yo+
July	Dominion Day Stakes	Woodbine	10	3yo+
July	Vigil Stakes	Woodbine	7	4yo+
July	Ontario Matron Stakes	Woodbine	8.5	3yo+ f
July/August	Seagram Cup Stakes	Woodbine	8.5	3yo+
August	Ontario Colleen Stakes	Woodbine	8	3yo f
August	Canadian Derby	Century Mile	10	3yo
August	Ballerina Stakes	Hastings	9	3yo+ f
September	Bold Venture Stakes	Woodbine	6.5	3yo+
September	Seaway Stakes	Woodbine	7	3yo+ f
September	British Columbia Derby	Hastings	9	3yo
October	Grey Stakes	Woodbine	8.5	2yo
October	Mazarine Stakes	Woodbine	8.5	2yo f
October	Ontario Derby	Woodbine	9	3yo
October	BC Premier's Handicap	Hastings	11	3yo+
October	Durham Cup Stakes	Woodbine	9	3yo+
November	Autumn Stakes	Woodbine	8.5	3yo+
November	Maple Leaf Stakes	Woodbine	10	3yo+ f
November	Ontario Fashion Stakes	Woodbine	6	3yo+ f
December	Valedictory Stakes	Woodbine	14	3yo+

== Listed ==
Month	Race Name	Racecourse	Dist. (f)	Age/Sex
August	Ballerina Stakes	Hastings	9	3yo+ f

== Canadian Triple Crown races ==
Month	Race Name	Racecourse	Dist. (f)	Age/Sex
August	King's Plate	Woodbine	10	3yo
September	Prince of Wales Stakes	Fort Erie	9.5	3yo
October	Breeders' Stakes	Woodbine	12	3yo
