= Nearctic Stakes =

Turf horse race in Canada

- Class: Grade II
- Location: Woodbine Racetrack; Toronto, Ontario
- Inaugurated: 1973
- Race type: Thoroughbred - Flat racing
- Website: woodbineentertainment.com

Race information
- Distance: 6 furlong sprint
- Surface: Turf
- Track: Left-handed
- Qualification: Three-year-olds and up
- Weight: Assigned
- Purse: $250,000 (2021)

The Nearctic Stakes is a Canadian Thoroughbred horse race run annually in mid October at Woodbine Racetrack in Toronto, Ontario. The Grade II sprint is raced on turf over a distance of six furlongs and currently offers a purse of $232,290.

Previously a Grade II race, it was upgraded to Grade I status for 2010 but has returned to Grade II.

Inaugurated in 1973 to honor Windfield's Farms champion Nearctic, the 1958 Canadian Horse of the Year, Canadian Horse Racing Hall of Fame inductee, and sire of the 20th Century's most important sire, Northern Dancer.

The Nearctic Stakes was raced on dirt until 1995 when it was shifted to the Turf.

== Records ==
Speed record on turf:

- 0:56.19 - No Nay Hudson (2025) 5 furlongs
- 1:07.60 Wild Zone (1996) 6 furlongs

Speed record on dirt:

- 1:09.00 - Megas Vukefalos (1992)

Most wins:

- 2 - Play The King (1987, 1988)
- 2 - Wild Zone (1995, 1996)

Most wins by an owner:

- 3 - Sam-Son Farm (1978, 1989, 2003)

Most wins by a jockey:

- 4 - Robin Platts (1973, 1974, 1975, 1979)

Most wins by a trainer:

- 4 - Daniel J. Vella (1990, 1994, 1995, 2009)

== Winners of the Nearctic Stakes ==
Year	Winner	Age	Jockey	Trainer	Owner	Time
2026	Victory Achieved	5	Rafael Manuel Hernandez	Mark E. Casse	Live Oak Plantation	1:09.30
2025	No Nay Hudson (IRE)	5	Pablos Morales	Wesley A. Ward	Andrew Farm and For the People Racing Stable LLC	0:56.19
2024	Patches O'Houlihan	4	Sofia Vives	Robert P. Tiller	Frank D. Di Giulio Jr.	1:09.49
2023	Big Invasion	4	Dylan Davis	Christophe Clement	Reeves Thoroughbred Racing	1:11.31
2022	Cazadero	4	Patrick Husbands	Brendan P. Walsh	Marc Detampel	1:09.11
2021	Avie's Flatter	5	Luis Contreras	Josie Carroll	Ivan Dalos	1:10.52
2020	Silent Poet	5	Justin Stein	Nicholas J. Gonzalez Jr.	Stronach Stables	1:08.57
2019	City Boy	5	Jesse Campbell	Michael Keogh	Est of Gustav Schickedanz & Donald Howard	1:08.18
2018	Hembree	4	Irad Ortiz	Michael Maker	Three Diamonds Farm	1:08.95
2017	Field of Courage	5	Luis Contreras	Mark E. Casse	Quintessential Racing, FL	1:12.07
2016	Calgary Cat	6	Luis Contreras	Kevin Attard	Steven Chesney & Cory Hoffman	1:08.32
2015	Bye Bye Bernie	5	Rafael M. Hernandez	Brendan P. Walsh	DARRS Inc	1:09.00
2014	Caspar Netscher (GB)	5	Andrew Mullen	David Simcock	Charles Wentworth	1:08.97
2013	Phil's Dream	5	Justin Stein	Paul M. Buttigieg	Buttigieg Training Centre	1:10.83
2012	Next Question	4	Ramon Dominguez	Michael J. Trombetta	Three Diamonds Farm	1:09.32
2011	Regally Ready	4	Corey Nakatani	Steve Asmussen	Vinery Stable	1:11.35
2010	Serious Attitude	4	Garrett Gomez	Rae Guest	Derek J. Willis & Rae Guest	1:09.1
2009	Field Commission	4	Julien Leparoux	Daniel J. Vella	E. Selzer & D. J. Vella	1:09.23
2008	True to Tradition	6	Kendrick Carmouche	Scott A. Lake	Ben Mondello & Adam Russo	1:09.11
2007	Heros Reward	5	Javier Castellano	Dale Capuano	Rob Ry Farm & Jayne Marie Slysz	1:08.04
2006	Fast Parade	3	Patrick Valenzuela	Peter Miller	Gary & Cecil Barber	1:12.41
2005	Steel Light	4	Corey Nakatani	Christophe Clement	Moyglare Stud	1:12.14
2004	I Thee Wed	4	Jim McAleney	David R. Bell	Pin Oak Stable	1:09.36
2003	Soaring Free	4	Todd Kabel	Mark Frostad	Sam-Son Farm	1:07.73
2002	Nuclear Debate	7	David R. Flores	Darrell Vienna	Herrick Racing	1:07.86
2001	Mr. Epperson	6	James McKnight	Scott H. Fairlie	R & S. Fairlie et al.	1:08.86
2000	Kahal	6	Brice Blanc	Neil D. Drysdale	Shadwell Racing	1:11.07
1999	Clever Response	4	Emile Ramsammy	Michael Keogh	Gus Schickedanz	1:10.19
1998	Rushiscomingup	5	Richard Dos Ramos	Paul Buttigieg	Farrugia & Buttigieg	1:08.20
1997	Jilin	5	David Clark	John P. MacKenzie	Greenoaks Farm	1:08.60
1996	Wild Zone	6	Robert Landry	Frank Passero Jr.	Mrs. Augustus Riggs IV & Stronach	1:07.60
1995	Wild Zone	5	Shane Sellers	Daniel J. Vella	Mrs. Augustus Riggs IV & Stronach	1:08.40
1994	King Ruckus	4	Todd Kabel	Daniel J. Vella	Frank Stronach	1:09.60
1993	British Banker	5	Dave Penna	Michael J. Doyle	Dogwood Stable	1:09.40
1992	Megas Vukefalos	4	Don Seymour	Phil England	Knob Hill Stable	1:09.00
1991	Hadif	5	Dave Penna	Tom Skiffington, Jr.	Shadwell Racing	1:10.00
1990	Dargai	4	Brian Swatuk	Daniel J. Vella	Knob Hill Stable	1:10.00
1989	Regal Intention	4	Jack Lauzon	James E. Day	Sam-Son Farm	1:10.20
1988	Play The King	5	Don Seymour	Roger Attfield	Kinghaven Farms	1:10.00
1987	Play The King	4	Don Seymour	Roger Attfield	Kinghaven Farms	1:09.80
1986	New Connection	5	Dave Penna	Trevor Swan	J. Douglas Cameron	1:10.60
1985	Dancer's Bo Jin	4	Daniel David	Jerry G. Lavigne	Gerry E. Going	1:11.40
1984	Diapason	4	Gary Stahlbaum	Jacques Dumas	Jean Lapointe	1:09.80
1983	Ask Muhammad	4	Richard Dos Ramos	Michael Silvera	Gordon F. Hall	1:11.20
1982	Reddy Roadster	7	Brian Swatuk	Conrad J. Cohen	Susan Cohen	1:10.20
1981	Solo Guy	3	George HoSang	Laurie Silvera	Gordon F. Hall	1:10.60
1980	La Voyageuse	5	J. Paul Souter	Yonnie Starr	Jean-Louis Levesque	1:09.80
1979	Ocean Emperor	4	Robin Platts	J. Mack	Pel-Gam-Ski Stable	1:10.20
1978	Stutz Bearcat	3	George HoSang	James E. Day	Sam-Son Farm	1:09.80
1977	Jilting Jim	4	Sandy Hawley	Jake Nemett	Roger E. Leslie	1:10.60
1976	Park Romeo	5	Lloyd Duffy	Jerry G. Lavigne	Parkview Stable	1:12.60
1975	Gurkhas Band	3	Robin Platts	Gil Rowntree	Stafford Farms	1:11.00
1974	Henry Tudor	5	Robin Platts	Lou Cavalaris, Jr.	Gardiner Farm	1:11.20
1973	Rare Adventure	4	Robin Platts	Lou Cavalaris, Jr.	Gardiner Farm	1:10.40

== See also ==
- List of Canadian flat horse races
