= British Columbia Derby =

- Class: Grade III
- Location: Hastings Racecourse; Vancouver, British Columbia
- Inaugurated: 1946
- Race type: Thoroughbred - Flat racing
- Website: www.hastingspark.com

Race information
- Distance: 1 1/8 miles (9 furlongs)
- Surface: Dirt
- Track: left-handed
- Qualification: Three-year-olds, limited to twelve starters
- Weight: Colts & Geldings: 126 lbs. Fillies: 121 lbs
- Purse: $150,000 (2017)

The British Columbia Derby is a Canadian Thoroughbred horse race run annually in September at Hastings Racecourse (formerly Exhibition Park) in Vancouver, British Columbia. Established in 2023, the British Columbia Derby is the third and final jewel of the Western Canadian Triple Crown.

== History ==
Prior to 1961 (except for 1949 and 1956), the BC Derby was run at Lansdowne Park Racetrack in Richmond, British Columbia. The BC Derby was not run in 2020 or 2021 owing to factors relating to the Covid 19 pandemic.

Open to three-year-old horses, the Grade III is run on dirt at a distance of 1 1/8 miles (9 furlongs) and currently (2022) offers a purse of CDN$125,000, the richest and most important race at Hastings Racecourse.

== Winners since 1990 ==
| Year | Winner | Jockey | Trainer | Owner | Time |
|---|---|---|---|---|---|
| 2025 | Rondelito | Kimal Santo | Steve Henson | Lorie Henson | 1:50.30 |
| 2024 | August Rain | Amadeo Perez | Barbara Heads | Peter Redekop B. C. Ltd. | 1:51.20 |
| 2023 | Accidental Hero | Kimal Santo | Larry Grieve | WYN Racing Stables Corp. | 1:50.05 |
| 2022 | Regal Riot | Efrain Hernandez | Robert J. Anderson | M. Kim Peacock and Lance Giesbrecht | 1:50.73 |
| 2019 | Five Star General | Mario Gutierrez | Glen Todd | North American Thoroughbred Horse Co. | 1:52.43 |
| 2018 | Sky Promise | Rico Walcott | Robertino Diodoro | R6 Stable, R&C Wiest, N. Tremblay | 1:51.71 |
| 2017 | Chief Know It All | Rico Walcott | Robertino Diodoro | Rollingson Racing Stable, R&C Wiest, R. Howg | 1:51.90 |
| 2016 | Sorryaboutnothing | Antonio Ambrosio Reyes | Troy Taylor | North American Thoroughbred Horse Co. | 1:50.45 |
| 2015 | Academic | Justin Stein | Tim Rycroft | Bear Stable/Riversedge Racing Stables | 1:50.33 |
| 2014 | Alert Bay | Rico Walcott | Anita Bolton | Peter Redekop B.C. Ltd. | 1:49.12 |
| 2013 | Title Contender | Rico Walcott | Anita Bolton | Peter Redekop B.C. Ltd. | 1:48.24 |
| 2012 | Second City | Richard Hamel | Craig MacPherson | Peter Redekop B.C. Ltd. | 1:50.94 |
| 2011 | Northern Causeway | William Antongeorgi, Jr. | Len Kasmerski | Rozamund Barclay | 1:50.22 |
| 2010 | Majesticality | Richard Hamel | Barbra Heads | Russell J and Lois Bennett | 1:50.80 |
| 2009 | Winning Machine | Gallyn Mitchell | Doris Harwood | Fleur De Lis Stables | 1:50.95 |
| 2008 | Krazy Koffee | David Wilson | Cindy Krasner | Butch Goertzen | 1:50.95 |
| 2007 | Celtic Dreamin | Gerry Olguin | Rafael Becerra | K. K. Sangara | 1:49.50 |
| 2006 | Halo Steven | Pedro Alvarado | Barbara Heads | Marta Racing Ventures | 1:49.96 |
| 2005 | Spaghetti Mouse | David Wilson | Gary Demorest | Nick & Pauline Felicella | 1:49.30 |
| 2004 | Flamethrowintexan | Ricky Frazier | Kay Penny Cooper | Grasshopper Stable | 1:49.58 |
| 2003 | Roscoe Pito | Pedro Alvarado | John Snow | Wildcard Stable et al. | 1:51.58 |
| 2002 | Cruising Kat | Nicola Wright | Daryl Snow | Daryl Snow and J. Spevakow | 1:50.49 |
| 2001 | Fancy As | Richard Hamel | Ronald K. Smith | Red Ron Farms and Linda Smith | 1:50.71 |
| 2000 | Makors Mark | Gary Baze | David Forster | Makors Mark Inc. | 1:49.53 |
| 1999 | Wandering | Samuel Krasner | Steve Bryant | Kim Hart | 1:50.96 |
| 1998 | Vernon Invader | Chris Loseth | Alex Murray | W. J. and S. Amith | 1:51.00 |
| 1997 | Bobbin For Stars | Samuel Krasner | Lance Geisbrecht | Cecil Peacock | 1:49.80 |
| 1996 | Newdigs | Chris Loseth | Terry Jordan | D. and R. Jacobson | 1:50.20 |
| 1995 | Flying Sauce | Robbie King | Sid Martin | 505 Farms/Whieldon | 1:50.60 |
| 1994 | Squire Jones | Buddy Winnett | Lance Geisbrecht | Peter Redekop B.C. Ltd. | 1:51.80 |
| 1993 | Humpty's Hoedown | Samuel Krasner | Mike Chambers | D. Bowman et al. | 1:50.20 |
| 1992 | Jellystone Park | Daniel Brock | Dan Ragen | Heather S. Dedomenico | 1:52.60 |
| 1991 | Bolulight | Mark Patzer | Peter Gregory | Empire Farms | 1:48.80 |
| 1990 | Ever Steady | Samuel Krasner | Peter Gregory | Empire Farms | 1:50.20 |

== Earlier winners from 1946 ==
- 1989 - Fleet Reserve
- 1988 - Regal Intention
- 1987 - Irish Bear
- 1986 - Fortinbras
- 1985 - Imperial Choice
- 1984 - Lets Go Blue
- 1983 - Prairie Breaker
- 1982 - Travelling Victor
- 1981 - Tempos Tiger
- 1980 - Ensign Earnem
- 1979 - Pole Position
- 1978 - Five Star General
- 1977 – Bucksaw
- 1976 - DBS Dream
- 1975 - Auguste
- 1974 - Norland
- 1973 - Kokos Pal
- 1972 - Decidedly D
- 1971 - Command Module
- 1970 - Mincemeat
- 1969 - Essence Of Time
- 1968 - Treasures Glory
- 1967 - Ahead Tiger
- 1966 - Bright Monarch
- 1965 - Hanko
- 1964 - George Royal
- 1963 - Feasible
- 1962 - Enchalade
- 1961 - Black Balladier
- 1960 - Collin Baykey
- 1959 - KY Music
- 1958 - Major Turley
- 1957 - Donn Baykey
- 1956 - Ali Miss
- 1955 - My Ladylove
- 1954 - Quality Quest
- 1953 - Liege
- 1952 - Battened Down
- 1951 - Eddie's Boy
- 1950 - Sco
- 1949 - Ab Jr.
- 1948 - Ohsodry
- 1947 - Cisalworth
- 1946 - Pacific Pearl

== See also ==
- List of Canadian flat horse races
