= Soaring Free =

Canadian-bred Thoroughbred racehorse (1999–2025)

- Sire: Smart Strike
- Grandsire: Mr. Prospector
- Dam: Dancing With Wings
- Damsire: Danzig
- Sex: Gelding
- Foaled: January 28, 1999
- Died: May 28, 2025 (aged 26); Sam-Son Farm, Ocala, Florida, U.S.
- Country: Canada
- Colour: Dark Bay
- Breeder: Sam-Son Farm
- Owner: Sam-Son Farm
- Trainer: Mark Frostad
- Record: 27: 15-4-0
- Earnings: $2,110,370

Major wins
- Nearctic Stakes (2003); Play The King Stakes (2003, 2004); Atto Mile (2004); Ontario Jockey Club Stakes (2004); Shakertown Stakes (2004, 2005); Highlander Stakes (2004, 2005)

Awards
- Canadian Champion Sprinter (2003); Canadian Champion Male Turf Horse (2004); Canadian Horse of the Year (2004)

Soaring Free (January 28, 1999 – May 28, 2025) was a Canadian Champion Thoroughbred racehorse.

== Background ==
Soaring Free was bred and raced by one of Canada's leading Thoroughbred operations, Sam-Son Farm. He was out of the mare Dancing With Wings, a daughter of three-time Champion Sire, Danzig. Soaring Free's sire is the increasingly influential Smart Strike who also sired Eclipse Award winner English Channel and the 2007 American Horse of the Year, Curlin.

A turf specialist who raced from a home base at Woodbine Racetrack in Toronto, at age four in 2003 Soaring Free won five of eight starts including the Nearctic Stakes plus his first of two Play The King Stakes.

== Racing career ==
In 2004 he won the Grade III Shakertown Stakes at Keeneland Race Course in Kentucky and at Woodbine Racetrack set a North American record of 1:19.38 for 7 furlongs on turf in winning the Ontario Jockey Club Stakes. Soaring Free also won his second straight Play The King Stakes in 2004 as well as the Highlander Stakes. He then earned the most important win of his career in race record time in the Grade I Atto Mile, a race in which he had finished second the previous year. He ended the year, finishing fourth in the Breeders' Cup Mile, 2¼ lengths behind upset winner Singletary.

Racing at age six in 2005, Soaring Free won his second consecutive Shakertown Stakes at Keeneland Race Course and his second consecutive Highlander Stakes at Woodbine.

== Death ==
Soaring Free died on May 28, 2025, at the age of 26.
