= Constant Montpellier =

Canadian jockey

Personal information
- Born: August 30, 1961 (age 64) Vaudreuil-Dorion, Quebec, Canada
- Occupation: Jockey

Horse racing career
- Sport: Horse racing
- Career wins: 1,235+ (ongoing)

Major racing wins
- King Edward Stakes (1994); Canadian Stakes (1996); Grey Stakes (1998); Sky Classic Stakes (1999, 2001); Autumn Stakes (2001); Manitoba Derby (2001); Marine Stakes (2001); Plate Trial Stakes (2001); Canadian Derby (2002); Coronation Futurity Stakes (2002); Jammed Lovely Stakes (2002, 2007); Sir Barton Stakes (2002); Achievement Stakes (2003); Steady Growth Stakes (2003); Ontario Debutante Stakes (2005); Colin Stakes (2006); Swynford Stakes (2006); La Lorgnette Stakes (2007) Canadian Classic Race wins: Prince of Wales Stakes (1999, 2001)

Racing awards
- Canadian Outstanding Apprentice Jockey (1993)

Significant horses
- Barbeau Ruckus, Gandria, Mine That Bird, Win City

Constant Montpellier (born August 30, 1961) is a Canadian jockey in Canadian Thoroughbred horse racing. In 1993, he won the Sovereign Award as Canada's Outstanding Apprentice Jockey. Montpellier was born in Vaudreuil-Dorion, Quebec.

Prior to his career in Thoroughbred racing, Montpeller was a newspaper and magazine photographer in Montreal. In 2007, Constant Montpellier took up the sport of speed skating and the following year won the Gold Medal in the 40–49 age group at the North American speed skating championships.

In 2008, Montpellier rode 2009 Kentucky Derby winner Mine That Bird in his first two starts.

Chart (2000–present)	Peak position
National Earnings List for Jockeys 2000	50
National Earnings List for Jockeys 2001	57
National Earnings List for Jockeys 2002	37
National Earnings List for Jockeys 2003	47
National Earnings List for Jockeys 2004	79
National Earnings List for Jockeys 2005	97
