= George Royal =

Canadian-bred Thoroughbred racehorse

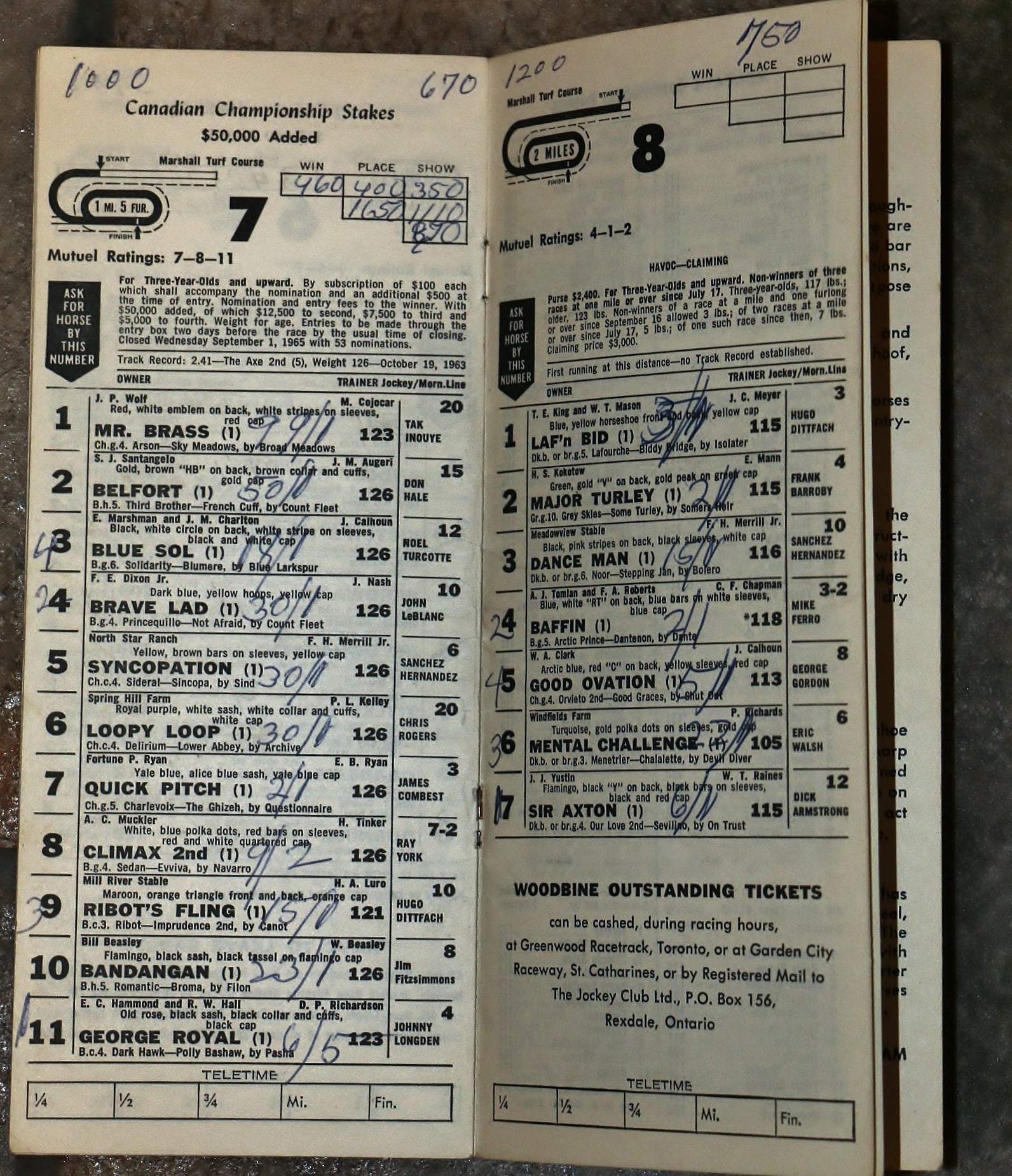
- George Royals' 1965 Canadian Champion Stakes program
- Sire: Dark Hawk
- Grandsire: Alibhai
- Dam: Polly Bashaw
- Damsire: Pasha
- Sex: Stallion
- Foaled: 1961
- Country: Canada
- Colour: Bay
- Breeder: D. J. Wilson Dunn
- Owner: Robert W. Hall & Ernie Hammond
- Trainer: Robert W. Hall; Donald Richardson; George Dunn
- Record: 45: 21-5-4
- Earnings: $323,693

Major wins
- British Columbia Derby (1964); San Juan Capistrano Handicap (1965 & 1966); Canadian International Stakes (1965 & 1966)

Awards
- Canadian Horse Of The Year (1965)

Honours
- Canadian Horse Racing Hall of Fame (1976); British Columbia Horse Racing Hall of Fame (1988); George Royal Stakes at Hastings Racecourse; Life-sized statue at Hastings Racecourse
- Last updated on February 15, 2007

George Royal (1961–1981) was a Canadian Hall of Fame Thoroughbred racehorse.

== Background ==
George Royal was a bay horse foaled in Cloverdale, British Columbia. He was sired by Dark Hawk out of the mare Polly Bashaw. His great-grandsire was Hyperion, son of the English Triple Crown Champion Gainsborough. He was originally owned by Robert Hall and Ernie Hammond and trained by Robert W. Hall.

== Racing career ==
The colt began racing at two at Vancouver's Exhibition Park, winning four of his eight starts. Although a winner of nine consecutive stakes races at age three, he received little notice in Canada in 1964 as a result of Northern Dancer becoming the first Canadian-bred to win the Kentucky Derby. Ridden and eventually trained by Texan Donald Richardson, George Royal was sent to California to compete, where Johnny Longden took over as jockey. In 1965, George Dunn handled his conditioning, for a short time, on behalf of Robert Hall. In 1965, George Royal won the 1 3/4-mile San Juan Capistrano Handicap on the turf at Santa Anita Park, then later the Canadian International Stakes at Woodbine Racetrack in Toronto. His performances in 1965 made him the first British Columbia-bred horse to win Canadian Horse of the Year honours. In 1965 George Royal made Canadian history when he became the 1st horse to ride in a commercial passenger plane when he flew with Air Canada from Vancouver to Toronto. In 1966, in Johnny Longden's last race as a jockey, George Royal repeated as winner of the San Juan Capistrano Handicap. In the Clubhouse at Santa Anita Park there is an oil painting of the finish of the 1966 San Juan Capistrano, which was also used for the cover of the Santa Anita official program during the 1967 racing season. That fall, jockey Ismael Valenzuela made it back-to-back wins in the Canadian International Stakes.

== Stud record ==
Retired to stud duty as number two in earnings by a Canadian-bred horse, George Royal stood at Robert W. Hall's Emerald Acres farm in Aldergrove, British Columbia, where he sired several stakes winners before suffering a stroke in 1981 that led to his having to be humanely euthanized. He was buried at the family farm, Emerald Acres, where a monument marks the spot.

== Honours ==
On its creation in 1976, George Royal was inducted in the Canadian Horse Racing Hall of Fame. Honored by the British Columbia Horse Racing Hall of Fame, his statue stands in the paddock at Hastings Racecourse in Vancouver and a stakes race there bears his name.

== Pedigree ==
Pedigree of George Royal, bay horse, 1961
Sire Dark Hawk	Alibahai	Hyperion	Gainsborough
Sire Dark Hawk	Alibahai	Hyperion	Selene
Sire Dark Hawk	Alibahai	Teresina	Tracery
Sire Dark Hawk	Alibahai	Teresina	Blue Tit
Sire Dark Hawk	Break Up	Unbreakable	Sickle
Sire Dark Hawk	Break Up	Unbreakable	Blue Glass
Sire Dark Hawk	Break Up	The Bride	Haste
Sire Dark Hawk	Break Up	The Bride	First Play
Dam Polly Bashaw	Pasha	The Porter	Sweep
Dam Polly Bashaw	Pasha	The Porter	Ballet Girl
Dam Polly Bashaw	Pasha	Fatima	Radium
Dam Polly Bashaw	Pasha	Fatima	Favilla
Dam Polly Bashaw	Sweet Polly	Kopi	Spion Cop
Dam Polly Bashaw	Sweet Polly	Kopi	Suncroft
Dam Polly Bashaw	Sweet Polly	Hampstead	Syndrian
Dam Polly Bashaw	Sweet Polly	Hampstead	Gay Polly (family: 4-d)
