= Trillium Stakes =

- Class: Grace III
- Location: Woodbine Racetrack; Toronto, Ontario, Canada
- Inaugurated: 2011
- Race type: Thoroughbred - Flat racing

Race information
- Distance: 1 1/16 miles (8.5 furlongs)
- Surface: Tapeta
- Track: left-handed
- Qualification: Fillies & Mares, three-years-old & up
- Weight: Weight-For-Age
- Purse: $125,000 (2019)

The Trillium Stakes is a Canadian Thoroughbred horse race run annually at Woodbine Racetrack in Toronto, Ontario. Held in June, it is open to fillies and mares, age three and older.

The Trillium Stakes was first run in 2011 and was elevated to Grade III status in 2018. The first two runnings of the race were over 1 1/8 miles before the distance was reduced to 1 1/16 in 2013. The race is run on Woodbine's synthetic dirt track: the surface was Polytrack until 2017 when it was replaced by Tapeta.

== Records ==
Speed record:

- 1:42.78 - Souper Escape (2020)

Most wins:

- 2 - Checkered Past (2014, 2015)
- 2 - Souper Escape (2020, 2021)

Most wins by an owner:

- 3 - Gary Barber (2013, 2019, 2024)

Most wins by a jockey:

- 4 - Eurico Rosa da Silva (2013, 2014, 2015, 2018)

Most wins by a trainer:

- 3 - Mark E. Casse (2013, 2019, 2024)

== Winners ==
Year	Winner	Age	Jockey	Trainer	Owner	Dist. (Miles)	Time	Win$	Gr.
2026	Fantastical	5	Rafael Manuel Hernandez	Joe Sharp	Carl R. Moore Management	1 1/8 m	1:51.15	$105,000	G3
2025	Literate	5	Sahin Civaci	Martin Drexler	C2 Racing Stable LLC	1 1/16 m	1:43.23	$150,000	G3
2024	Solo Album	4	Sahin Civaci	Mark E. Casse	Gary Barber, Eclipse Thoroughbred Partners and Steven Rocco	1 1/16 m	1:43.90	$135,000	G3
2023	Il Malocchio	5	Sahin Civaci	Martin Drexler	Franco S. Meli	1 1/16 m	1:44.14	$150,000	G3
2022	Lady Speightspeare	4	Emma-Jayne Wilson	Roger L. Attfield	Charles E. Fipke	1 1/16 m	1:45.75	$150,000	G3
2021	Souper Escape	5	Luis Contreras	Michael J. Trombetta	Live Oak Plantation	1 1/16 m	1:43.12	$90,000	G3
2020	Souper Escape	4	Luis Contreras	Michael J. Trombetta	Live Oak Plantation	1 1/16 m	1:42.78	$75,000	G3
2019	Miss Mo Mentum	4	Jerome Lermyte	Mark Casse	Gary Barber	1 1/16 m	1:43.30	$75,000	G3
2018	Gamble's Ghost	5	Eurico Rosa da Silva	Josie Carroll	Ivan Dalos	1 1/16 m	1:43.61	$75,000	G3
2017	Minks Aprise	5	Rafael M. Hernandez	Roger Attfield	KMN Racing	1 1/16 m	1:44.72	$60,000	
2016	Hot Kiss	4	Jesse M. Campbell	Michael Depaulo	Phoenix Racing	1 1/16 m	1:45.10	$72,000	
2015	Checkered Past	5	Eurico Rosa da Silva	Malcolm Pierce	Sam-Son Farm	1 1/16 m	1:43.29	$72,000	
2014	Checkered Past	4	Eurico Rosa da Silva	Malcolm Pierce	Sam-Son Farm	1 1/16 m	1:43.29	$72,000	
2013	Sisterly Love	5	Eurico Rosa da Silva	Mark Casse	Gary Barber	1 1/16 m	1:43.29	$75,000	
2012	Stars To Shine	5	Alex Solis	Mark Frostad	Grange House Partnership	1 1/8 m	1:51.26	$60,000	
2011	Upperline	4	Emma-Jayne Wilson	Michael Stidham	Stone Farm/Adger/Oakcrest Farm/Stidham	1 1/8 m	1:50.64	$60,000	

== See also ==
- List of Canadian flat horse races
