= Starting gate =

Machine used to ensure a fair start to a horse race

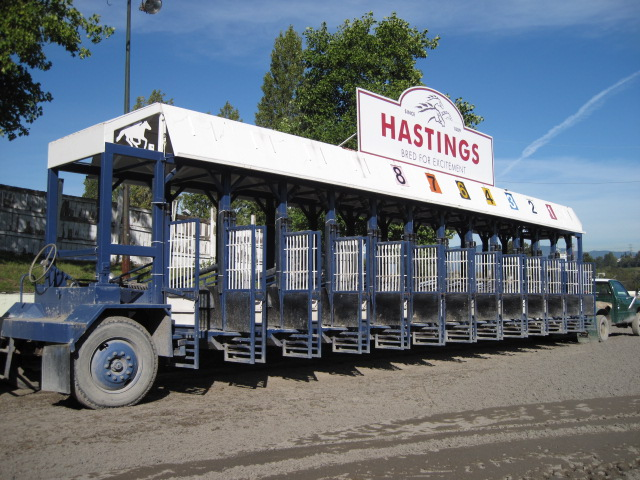
Hastings Racecourse's starting gate, 2009.

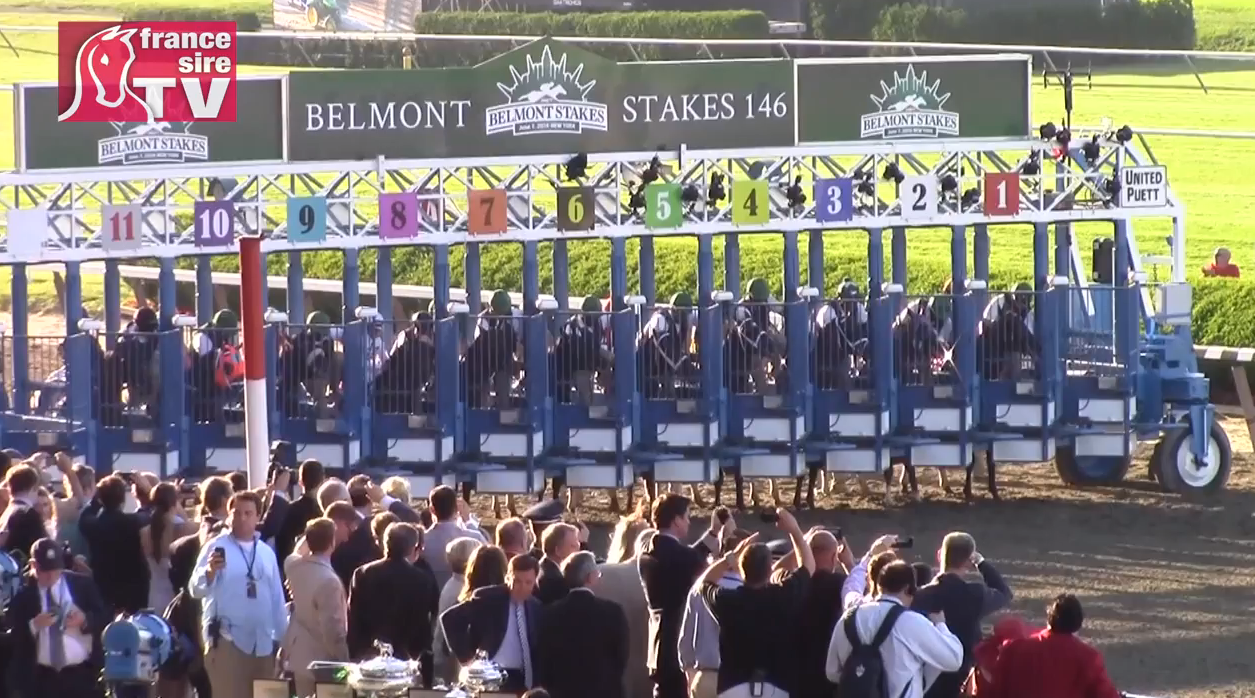
Start of the Belmont Stakes 2014

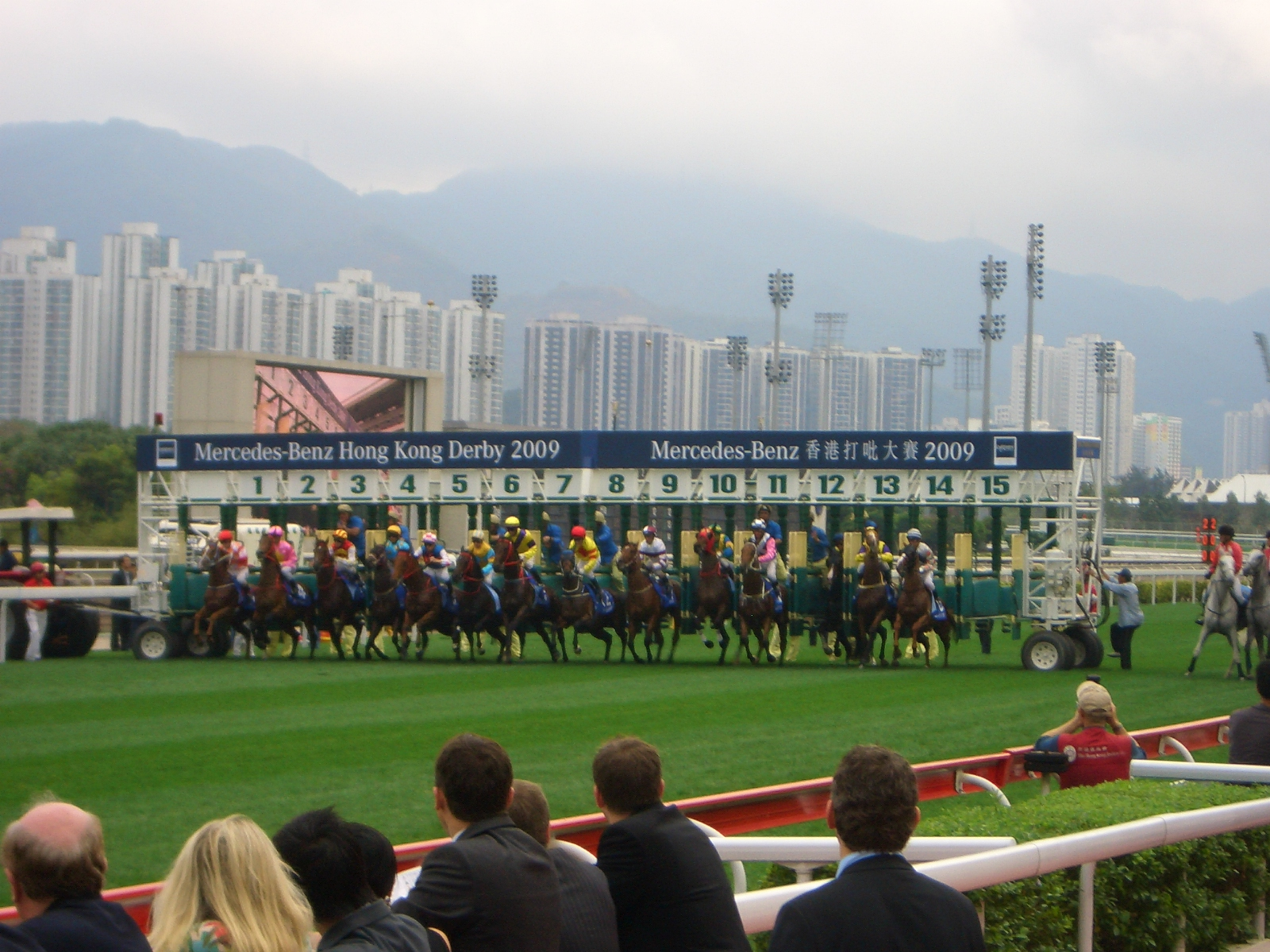
Horses leaving barrier stalls at the start of a Hong Kong Derby.

A starting gate, also called a starting barrier or starting stalls, is a machine used to ensure a fair start to in horse racing and dog racing.

== History ==
Throughout the history of horse racing, there have been proposals as to how better to start a race. A commonly used starting system for horse races was devised in the mid nineteenth century by Admiral Rous, a steward of the Jockey Club and public handicapper. A starter, standing alongside the jockeys and horses, dropped his flag to signal the start. An assistant some 100 yards down the course raised a second flag to indicate false starts.

An official starter might be well paid, but his duties were very demanding. Early in the twentieth century, he was supported by perhaps a single assistant who primed the spring-barrier, as well as the clerk of the course. In the present day there are many attendants to steady runners from super-structured barrier stalls.

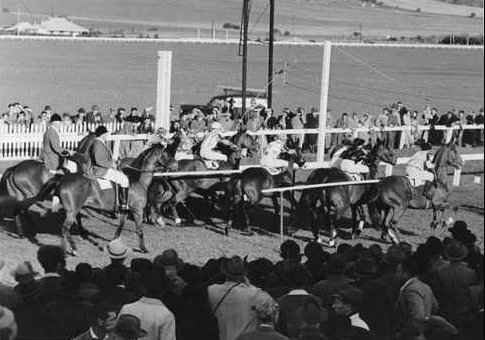
A strand barrier start of a horse race in South Australia in 1952

The first horse racing starting barriers were simple ropes or occasionally wooden barriers behind which the horses stood. The first automated design was pioneered in Australia and was first used at an official race meeting in 1894. Alexander Gray had concluded that the flapping of a starter's flag distracted the horses. An impetus for his invention was a £5 fine received by his son, Reuben, a jockey, for allowing his mount to step over the white chalk line that marked the start. His machine was first tried out at Canterbury Park Racecourse in New South Wales in February 1894. Gray's prototype consisted of a single strand of wire at about the height of the horse's head that was attached to a spring at either end. When the device was activated the barrier sprang up and away from the horses. Gray's single-strand barrier was among those first used. Versions of barriers designed by Alexander and Reuben Gray were installed at race tracks in Australia and overseas between 1894 and about 1932. By the 1920s the single strand barrier had evolved into a spring-powered five-strand device designed by Johnstone and Gleeson, but based on Gray's prototype, that resembled a strongman's chest expander. Barriers assured fair starts to races. Fair race starts encouraged owners to enter horses in races and punters to bet, and they contributed to changing horse racing from a social sporting event into a billion dollar industry.

The inventor of the electric starting gate for horse racing is Clay Puett, who was a rider and starter at various tracks in the American West. Puett's device replaced other starting methods which often failed to produce a fair start, with extra judges employed to catch horses who got a jump on the rest of the field.

Australia began using electronic starting gates in 1948. The first, based on Puett's design, was used at Canterbury Park Racecourse. The various turf clubs across Australia followed suit with electronic gates in the 1950s. Several decades later, in 2020, Australia supplied the United States with a starting gate when Steriline Racing shipped a 20-stall barrier to Churchill Downs to be used in the Kentucky Derby.

In 1965, starting stalls were introduced by the Jockey Club to horseracing in the United Kingdom.

== Flat horse racing ==
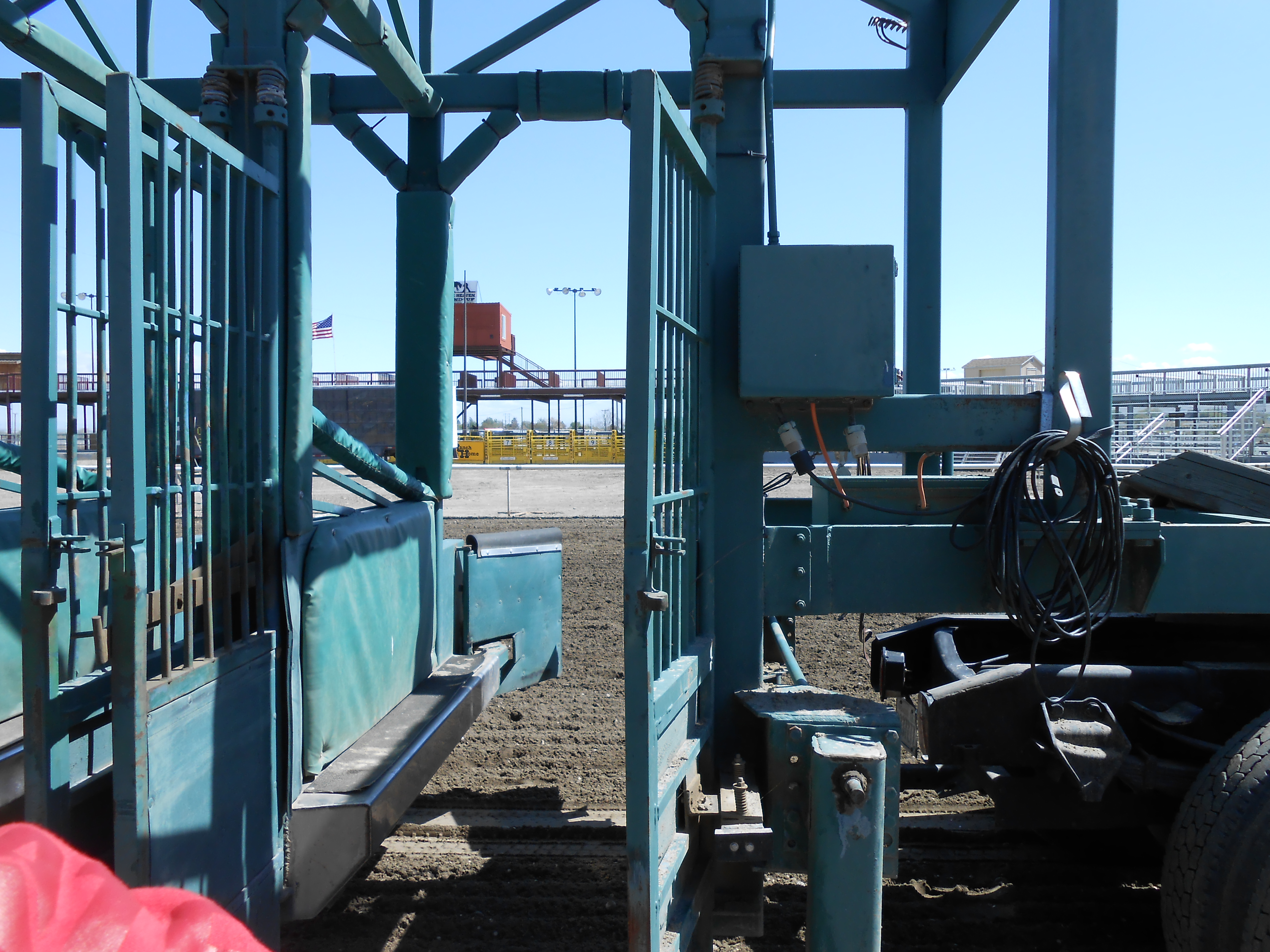
Starting gate detail, looking in from front to back

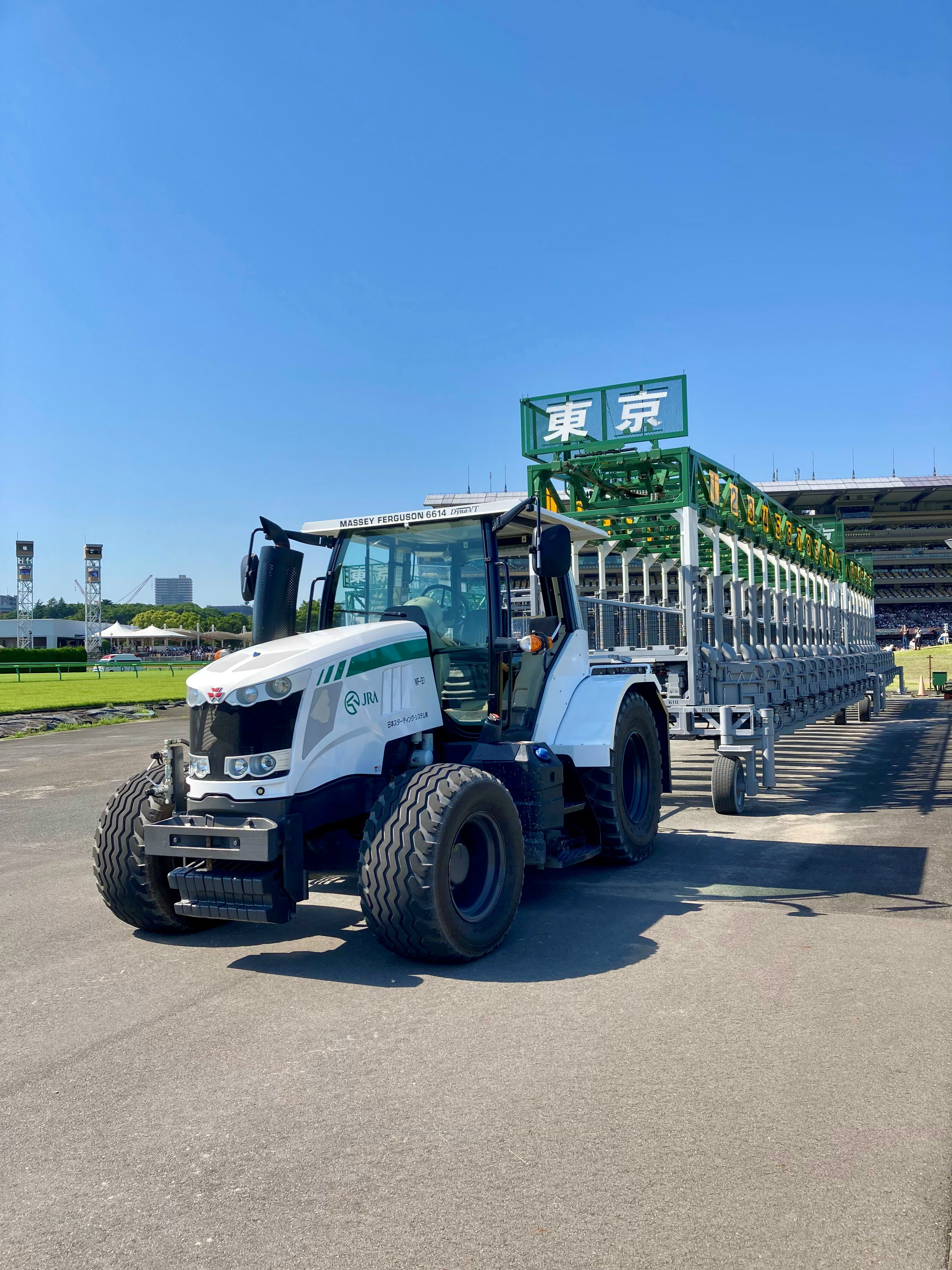
Tractor and starting gate at the Tokyo Racecourse

Many of Puett's actual gates are still in use today at tracks around the world, and all gates are based on his original design. A starting gate is equipped with a number of stalls aligned in a row, usually numbering 12 or 14 for everyday use at tracks. Smaller gates may be used at training facilities for schooling horses, or as an auxiliary gate in addition to the main gate for large-field races such as the Kentucky Derby.

The gates are suspended from an overhead welded steel truss, supported at each end by wheels with pneumatic tires. The entire structure is designed to be towed behind a tractor or truck, so that it can be moved about on the racetrack grounds, or towed over highways from place to place.

Horses normally enter from the rear of the stall, with gates locked behind the horse once it is in place; the front gates of the stall are normally closed as the horse is loaded in, though the starting-gate crew may open it in order to entice a horse who balks at entry. Alternately, a horse may be backed into the stall from the front entry, again done in the case of a skittish horse.

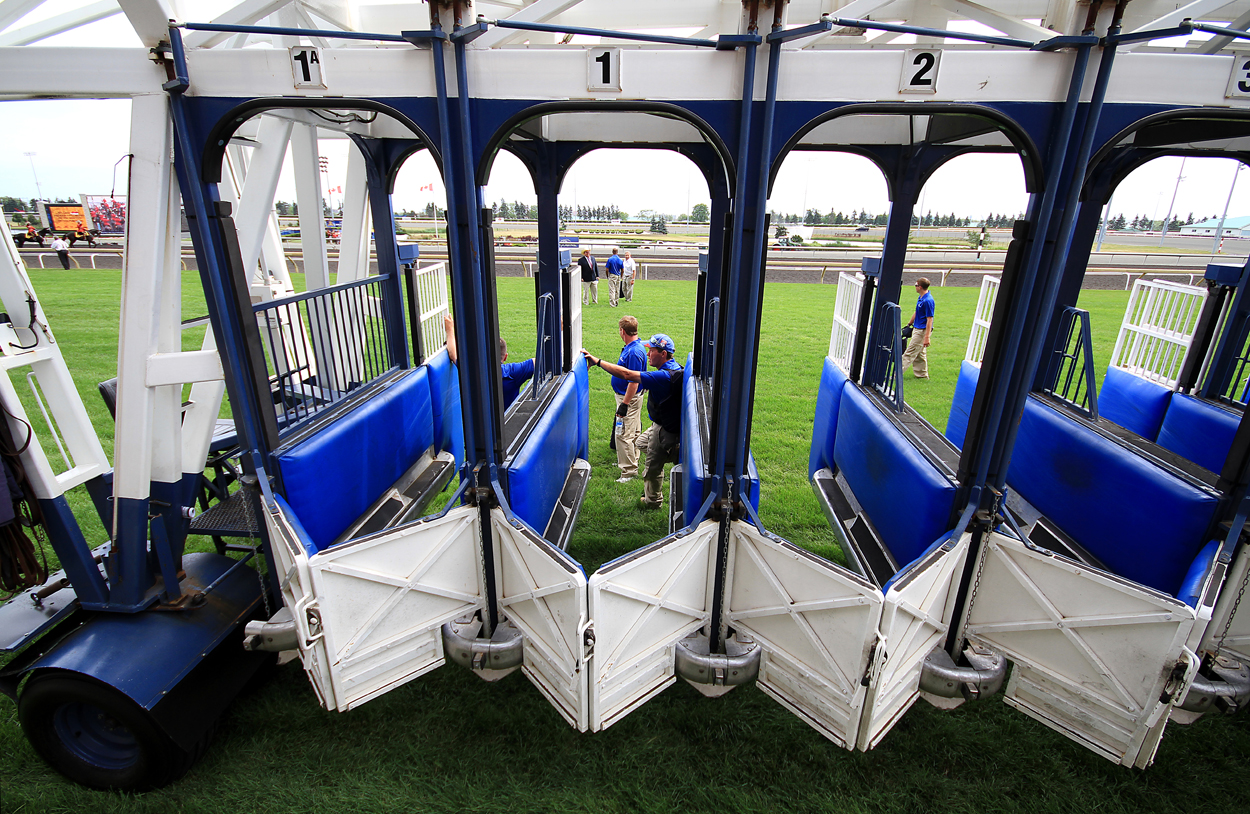
A Woodbine Racetrack starting gate, backside.

The front door of each stall is held closed by an electromagnetic lock. The stall doors are designed to give way in case a horse prematurely attempts to bolt through the front or back, in order to reduce or prevent injury to horse or rider.

When the starter is satisfied that all horses are in place and ready to start the race, he presses a button, cutting the electric current, simultaneously opening the front stall doors, ringing a loud bell, and sending a signal to the totalizator system that the race is begun and no more bets should be accepted.

Puett's gate was first used at Exhibition Park in Vancouver, British Columbia, in 1939, though the management of Bay Meadows Racetrack in San Mateo, California, say that their track was the first to use Puett's gate. By the end of 1940, virtually all major race tracks in the United States used Puett gates. Clay Puett began another company, True Center Gate, in 1958 based in Phoenix, Arizona. True Center and Puett's original company (first known as Puett Electric Gate company, now as United) currently account for most starting gate installations in North America. True Center also has gates in South America, the Caribbean and Saudi Arabia. Steriline Racing has supplied racetrack equipment to race clubs, trainers and horse owners in over 65 countries for more than 60 years. These prominent racing clubs use Steriline horse race starting gates: Churchill Downs, Royal Ascot, Meydan, the Hong Kong Jockey Club, Flemington and many others.

While starting gates are standard for flat racing, steeplechase tracks frequently still use earlier forms of starting barriers except in Australia, New Zealand and Japan.

== Harness racing ==
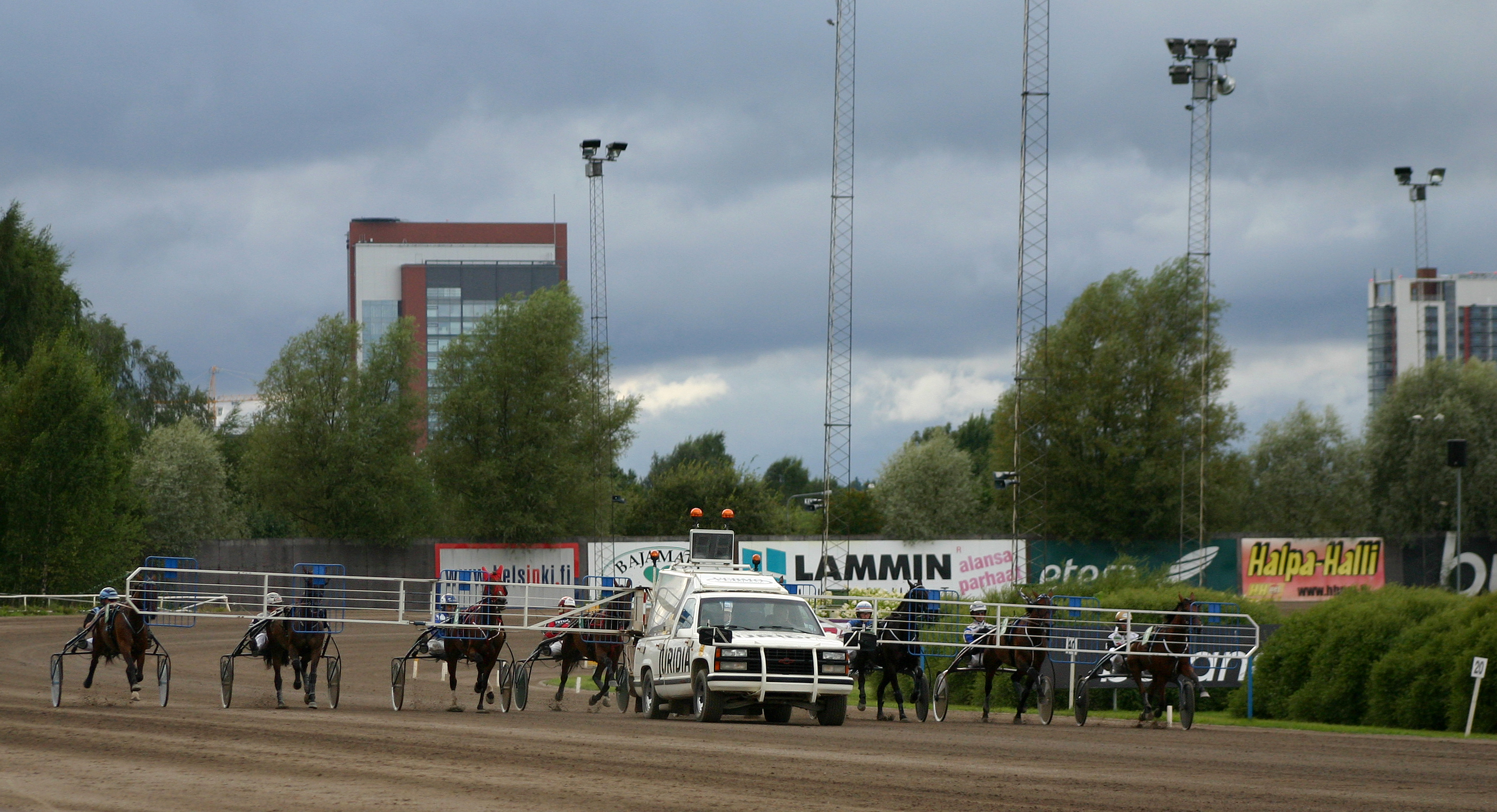
A mobile starting barrier used to begin an 8-horse heat. In cases where there are more horses, they will be arranged in a row directly after the first line horses

One of the reasons that harness racing was less popular than horse racing has been the reservations in gamblers’ minds about the various means of starting trotting races, particularly when bets have been lost before contests were properly under way. Before mobile starting gates gained popularity in harness racing, a rolling start was used. The horses were driven in a number of circles, and the manoeuvre, if carried out correctly, arranged the horses in lines. The fairness of the start was judged by stewards at the starting line; if they judged that a racer was not fairly in line with the others, a false start would be called and the race would start again. This process was sometimes repeated several times before a fair start occurred. In the middle 20th Century, the mobile starting gate was developed.

Most harness races now start from behind a motorized starting gate, called a "car start" or "auto start". This device consists of a car or pickup truck equipped with a hinged gate that resembles metal "wings" on each side of the vehicle. As the vehicle is driven down the center of the track, the wings are extended and the horses line up in order behind it. When the gate reaches the starting line, the starter retracts the wings, which fold inward toward the vehicle body. The vehicle then accelerates away from the horses and pulls off to the outside to let the racers proceed; in many cases, it then follows close behind the racers for officials to view the race and any potential infractions of rules. The modern starting gate uses a driver for steering the vehicle while the starter sits in the rear to concentrate on the actual horses positioning during the "score up". The starter will also observe the race and call a false start if required.

The motorized gate drastically reduced the number of false starts, but did not eliminate them. If the starter, who rides in the vehicle facing backward toward the horses, sees that the start is not fair in some way, he may issue a recall and order the race to be started again. Today, the start speed, acceleration, score up distance, and gate closing are controlled via a computer system, which takes control of the vehicle and provides a printout at the end of the score up.

The other kind of start to race is a standing start, where there are tapes across the track and the horses stand stationary behind the tapes before the start. This enables handicaps to be placed on horses according to class. Some European, Australian and New Zealand races start using tapes.

== Dog racing ==
Greyhound racing uses a device similar in nature and concept to the horse racing starting gate. The machine is usually called a starting box, owing to its use of boxes to hold the greyhounds in place. Dogs are loaded from the rear, with a small window in the front door through which the dog can see the track and the mechanical lure.

Once the lure has come around to a point a few meters behind the box, it passes a sensor which trips a switch to release the gates which swing upward to open, releasing the dogs. The opening gates start the race clock. Unlike horse racing, this action does not signal the totalizator system to end betting; that is done instead by a steward just before the lure is sent on its way.

Starting boxes normally hold eight dogs, with some holding nine.

== See also ==
- Hysplex
