= Neil Poznansky =

Personal information
- Born: July 25, 1972 (age 54) Edmonton, Alberta, Canada
- Occupation: Jockey

Horse racing career
- Sport: Horse racing
- Career wins: 761

Major racing wins
- Bold Venture Stakes (1996); Friar Rock Stakes (1996); Jammed Lovely Stakes (1997); Victorian Queen Stakes (1997); Highlander Stakes (1998); Ontario Colleen Stakes (1998); Ontario Debutante Stakes (1998); King Edward Handicap (1999); South Ocean Stakes (1999); Nassau Stakes (2000); Ontario Matron Stakes (2000); Shady Well Stakes (2000); Fort Erie Matchmaker Stakes (2002); Puss n Boots Stakes (2002); Miss Moneypenny Stakes (2002); Niagara Falls Cup Stakes (2006); Tampa Bay Turf Classic Stakes (2008); Cliff Guilliams Memorial Stakes (2008)

Racing awards
- Eclipse Award for Outstanding Apprentice Jockey (1996); Sovereign Award for Outstanding Apprentice Jockey (1996)

Significant horses
- Cafe Dancer, Desert Waves, Heliotrope

Neil Poznansky (born July 25, 1972) is a retired Canadian thoroughbred racing jockey who in 1996 was the National Champion Apprentice Jockey in the United States as well as the National Champion Apprentice Jockey in Canada.

The Eclipse Award was established in 1971 and the Sovereign Award in 1975. Through 2019 only four others have accomplished that feat. Mickey Walls did it first in 1991 with the second being Emma-Jayne Wilson in 2005 who is still the only female jockey to accomplish the feat. Omar Moreno did it in 2010 and Kazushi Kimura in 2019.

Poznansky successfully followed up his championship year until 2001, when his winners and earnings dropped significantly. Injuries hampered things further and in 2008, he retired from competitive riding to work as an exercise/training rider and was still active in that capacity through 2019.
