= Canadian Champion Male Sprint Horse =

The Canadian Champion Male Sprint Horse is a Canadian Thoroughbred horse racing honor that is part of the Sovereign Awards program awarded annually to the top Thoroughbred Male competing in sprint races in Canada. Created in 1980 by the Jockey Club of Canada as a single award for Canadian Champion Sprint Horse, in 2009 it was split so that it became a separate award for the male sprinter and for the Canadian Champion Female Sprint Horse.

== Winners ==
- 2009: Field Commission
- 2010: Hollywood Hit
- 2011: Essence Hit Man
- 2012: Essence Hit Man
- 2013: Phil's Dream
- 2014: Calgary Cat
- 2015: Stacked Deck
- 2016: Noholdingback Bear
- 2017: Pink Lloyd
- 2018: Pink Lloyd
- 2019: Pink Lloyd
- 2020: Pink Lloyd
- 2021: Pink Lloyd
- 2022: Filo Di Arianna (BRZ)
- 2023: Patches O’Houlihan
- 2024: Patches O’Houlihan
