= Sovereign Award for Outstanding Apprentice Jockey =

The Sovereign Award for Outstanding Apprentice Jockey is a Canadian Thoroughbred horse racing honour. Created in 1975 by the Jockey Club of Canada, it is part of the Sovereign Awards program and is awarded annually to a jockey undergoing their apprenticeship.

Honourees:

- 1975 : Jeffrey Fell
- 1976 : Chris Loseth
- 1977 : Brad Smythe
- 1978 : Ron Hansen
- 1979 : Ray Creighton
- 1980 : Valerie Thompson
- 1981 : Richard Dos Ramos
- 1982 : Richard Dos Ramos
- 1983 : Robert King
- 1984 : Robert King
- 1985 : Nancy Jumpsen
- 1986 : Todd Kabel
- 1987 : James McAleney
- 1988 : James McAleney
- 1989 : Maree Richards
- 1990 : Mickey Walls
- 1991 : Mickey Walls †
- 1992 : Stanley Bethley
- 1993 : Constant Montpellier
- 1994 : Dave Wilson
- 1995 : Dave Wilson
- 1996 : Neil Poznansky †
- 1997 : Rui Pimentel
- 1998 : Helen Vanek
- 1999 : Ben Russell
- 2000 : Cory Clark
- 2001 : Chantal Sutherland
- 2002 : Chantal Sutherland
- 2003 : Julia Brimo
- 2004 : Corey Fraser
- 2005 : Emma-Jayne Wilson †
- 2006 : Emma-Jayne Wilson
- 2007 : Tyler Pizarro
- 2008 : Janine Stianson
- 2009 : Omar Moreno
- 2010 : Omar Moreno
- 2011 : Ryan Pacheco
- 2012 : Scott Williams
- 2013 : Skye Chernetz
- 2014 : Sheena Ryan
- 2015 : Erika Smilovsky
- 2016 : Kayla Pizarro
- 2017 : Rey Williams
- 2018 : Kazushi Kimura
- 2019 : Kazushi Kimura
- 2020 : Mauricio Malvez
- 2021 : Mauricio Malvez
- 2022 : Slade Jones
- 2023 : Sofia Vives
- 2024 : Sofia Vives
- 2025 : Pietro Moran †

A † denotes a jockey who also won that year's United States Eclipse Award for Outstanding Apprentice Jockey.

== See also ==
Sovereign Award for Outstanding Jockey
