= Play the King =

Canadian Thoroughbred racehorse

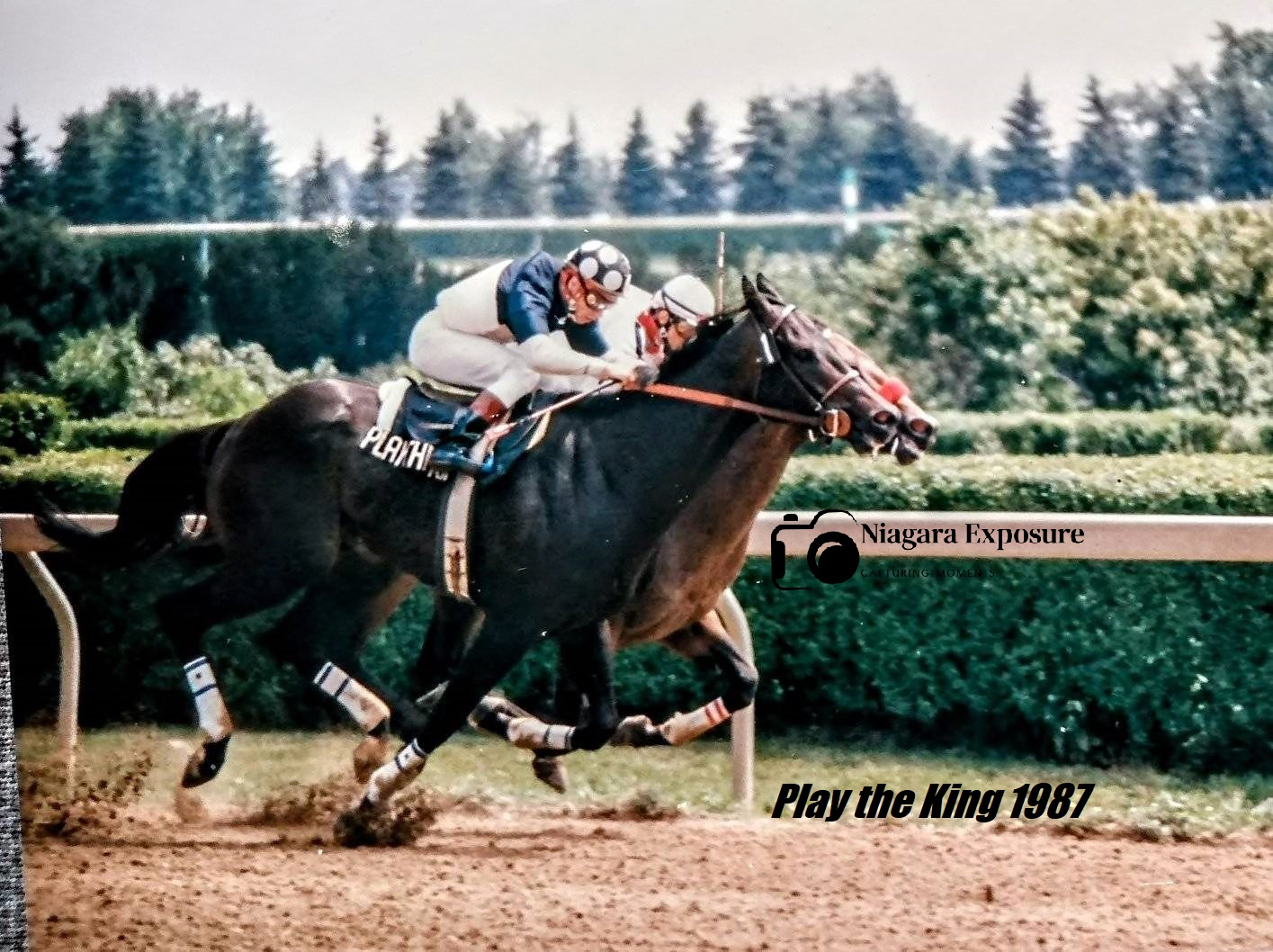
- Play the King winning the 1987 Highlander S. with Don Seymour riding
- Sire: King of Spain
- Grandsire: Philip of Spain
- Dam: Whisper
- Damsire: Laugh Aloud
- Sex: Gelding
- Foaled: 1983
- Country: Canada
- Colour: Dark Bay
- Breeder: Kinghaven Farms
- Owner: Kinghaven Farms
- Trainer: Roger Attfield
- Record: 29: 15-5-2
- Earnings: $937,605

Major wins
- Highlander Stakes (1987); Toboggan Handicap (1987); Vigil Handicap (1987); Jacques Cartier Stakes (1987); Toronto Breeders' Cup Handicap (1987, 1988); Nearctic Stakes (1987, 1988)

Awards
- Sovereign Award for Champion Older Male Horse (1987, 1988); Sovereign Award for Champion Sprinter (1987, 1988); Canadian Horse of the Year (1988)

Honours
- Play The King Stakes at Woodbine Racetrack Canadian Horse Racing Hall of Fame (2020)

Play the King (1983–1989) was a Canadian Champion Thoroughbred racehorse. Bred and raced by Kinghaven Farms of King City, Ontario, he was sired by King of Spain, a descendant of the very important sire Nearco. His dam was Whisper whose sire Laugh Aloud was a son of U.S. Racing Hall of Fame inductee, Tom Fool.

Trained by Roger Attfield, in 1987 Play the King won several important stakes races at his home base at Woodbine Racetrack in Toronto plus the Toboggan Handicap at Aqueduct Racetrack in Queens, New York. His performances earned him the 1987 Sovereign Award for Champion Older Male Horse as well as the Sovereign Award for Champion Sprinter.

In 1988, Play the King notably won his second consecutive Nearctic Stakes and Toronto Breeders' Cup Handicap and ran second to Gulch in the 1988 Breeders' Cup Sprint. In addition to being voted Canadian Horse of the Year, his performances also earned him his second straight Sovereign Award for Champion Older Male Horse and for Champion Sprinter.

On May 20, 1989, Play the King broke an ankle while competing in the Maryland Breeders' Cup Sprint Handicap at Pimlico Race Course. The severity of his injury was such that he had to be euthanized.
