= Travelling Victor =

Canadian-bred Thoroughbred racehorse

- Sire: Hail To Victory
- Grandsire: Hail To Reason
- Dam: Travelling Round
- Damsire: Travelling Dust
- Sex: Stallion
- Foaled: 1979
- Country: Canada
- Colour: Bay
- Breeder: Russell & Lois Bennett
- Owner: Russell & Lois Bennett
- Trainer: Robert G. Anderson
- Record: 52: 21-10-7
- Earnings: US$774,773

Major wins
- British Columbia Derby (1982); Seattle Handicap (1983); Sir Winston Churchill Handicap (1983); B.C. Premier's Championship Handicap (1983, 1985); Invitational Marathon Handicap (1983); Governor's Handicap (1984, 1985); Longacres Mile Handicap (1984)

Awards
- Canadian Champion Older Male Horse (1983); Canadian Horse of the Year (1983)

Honours
- British Columbia Horse Racing Hall of Fame (1991)
- Last updated on September 29, 2007

Travelling Victor (1979–1992) was a Canadian Thoroughbred Champion racehorse bred by Russell and Lois Bennett at their Flying Horse Farm in Westbank, British Columbia. In 1983 the horse became the first horse to be voted Canadian Horse of the Year which had not competed in the Province of Ontario.

During his career, Travelling Victor raced at tracks in Vancouver and the US State of Washington. He set two new track records for 1 3/8 miles (2.2 km) and 1 1/2 miles (2.4 km) at Exhibition Park Race Track in Vancouver.

Retired having won twenty-one races, of which fifteen were stakes events, Travelling Victor was standing at stud for his owners when he died unexpectedly in 1992. He is buried at Flying Horse Farm.
