= Sovereign Award for Outstanding Jockey =

The Sovereign Award for Outstanding Jockey is a Canadian thoroughbred horse racing honour given annually since 1975 by the Jockey Club of Canada. Part of the Sovereign Awards, the "Outstanding Jockey" laurel is similar to the Eclipse Award given to jockeys in the United States.

Honourees:

- 1975 : Hugo Dittfach
- 1976 : Chris Rogers
- 1977 : Avelino Gomez
- 1978 : Sandy Hawley
- 1979 : Robin Platts
- 1980 : Gary Stahlbaum
- 1981 : Irwin Driedger
- 1982 : Lloyd Duffy
- 1983 : Larry Attard
- 1984 : Chris Loseth
- 1985 : Don Seymour
- 1986 : Larry Attard
- 1987 : Don Seymour
- 1988 : Sandy Hawley
- 1989 : Don Seymour
- 1990 : Don Seymour
- 1991 : Mickey Walls
- 1992 : Todd Kabel
- 1993 : Robert Landry
- 1994 : Robert Landry
- 1995 : Todd Kabel
- 1996 : Emile Ramsammy
- 1997 : Emile Ramsammy
- 1998 : David Clark
- 1999 : Patrick Husbands
- 2000 : Patrick Husbands
- 2001 : Patrick Husbands
- 2002 : Patrick Husbands
- 2003 : Todd Kabel
- 2004 : Todd Kabel
- 2005 : Todd Kabel
- 2006 : Todd Kabel
- 2007 : Patrick Husbands
- 2008 : Patrick Husbands
- 2009 : Patrick Husbands
- 2010 : Eurico Rosa Da Silva
- 2011 : Luis Contreras
- 2012 : Luis Contreras
- 2013: Eurico Rosa Da Silva
- 2014: Patrick Husbands
- 2015: Eurico Rosa Da Silva
- 2016: Eurico Rosa Da Silva
- 2017: Eurico Rosa Da Silva
- 2018: Eurico Rosa Da Silva
- 2019: Eurico Rosa Da Silva
- 2020: Rafael Hernandez
- 2021: Kazushi Kimura
- 2022: Kazushi Kimura
- 2023: Kazushi Kimura
- 2024: Sahin Civaci
- 2025: Rafael Hernandez

== See also ==
- Sovereign Award for Outstanding Apprentice Jockey
