= Avelino Gomez Memorial Award =

The Avelino Gomez Memorial Award is a Canadian thoroughbred horse racing honour given annually to a jockey who is Canadian-born, Canadian-raised, or a regular in the country for more than five years, who has made significant contributions to the sport. The honour is named for the late Cuban-born Canadian and American Hall of Fame jockey Avelino Gomez who died in 1980 of complications from injuries sustained in a racing accident.

Avelino Gomez Memorial Award honourees receive a replica of the life-size statue of Gomez sculpted by Siggy Puchta that stands at Woodbine Racetrack.

In 2004, Francine Villeneuve became the first female recipient of the award.

== Award winners ==
- 2025 : J.P. Souter
- 2024 : Gunnar Lindberg
- 2023 : Russell Baze
- 2022 : Slade Callaghan
- 2021 : Eurico Rosa da Silva
- 2020 : no award given
- 2019 : Frank Barroby
- 2018 : Emma-Jayne Wilson
- 2017 : Gary Boulanger
- 2016 : Gary Stahlbaum
- 2015 : Quincy Welch
- 2014 : Patrick Husbands
- 2013 : Mickey Walls
- 2012 : Steven Bahen
- 2011 : Emile Ramsammy
- 2010 : Stewart Elliott
- 2009 : Robert King
- 2008 : Jack Lauzon
- 2007 : George HoSang
- 2006 : John LeBlanc
- 2005 : Sam Krasner
- 2004 : Francine Villeneuve
- 2003 : Robert Landry
- 2002 : Richard Dos Ramos
- 2001 : Chris Loseth
- 2000 : James McKnight
- 1999 : David Clark
- 1998 : Irwin Driedger
- 1997 : Richard Grubb
- 1996 : David A. Gall
- 1995 : Don Seymour
- 1994 : no award given
- 1993 : Larry Attard
- 1992 : Robin Platts
- 1991 : Hugo Dittfach
- 1990 : Lloyd Duffy
- 1989 : Jeffrey Fell
- 1988 : Chris Rogers
- 1987 : Don MacBeth
- 1986 : Sandy Hawley
- 1985 : Johnny Longden
- 1984 : Ron Turcotte
