= Ballerina Stakes (Canada) =

Canadian horse race

- Class: Listed
- Location: Hastings Racecourse, Vancouver, British Columbia
- Inaugurated: 1969
- Race type: Thoroughbred - Flat racing

Race information
- Distance: 1 1/8 miles (9 furlongs)
- Surface: Dirt
- Track: Left-handed
- Qualification: Fillies & Mares, 3-y-o+
- Weight: Weight-For-Age

The Ballerina Stakes is a Canadian Thoroughbred horse race run annually at Hastings Racecourse, Vancouver, British Columbia. Held in late September or early October, it is open to fillies and mares, age three and older.

The race was first contested in 1969 and is run over nine furlongs on dirt.

== Records ==
Speed record:

- 1:49.30 - Class Included (2012)

Most wins:

- 3 -Magic Code (1998, 1999, 2000)
- 3 - Infinite Patience (2022, 2023, 2024)

Most wins by a trainer:

- 5 - David Forster (1993, 1998, 1999, 2000, 2013)

== Winners since 1998 ==
Year	Winner	Age	Jockey	Trainer	Owner	Time
1998	Magic Code	3	Alan Cuthbertson	David V Forster	Mr & Mrs D Forster & R Chan	1:52.20
1999	Magic Code	4	Alan Cuthbertson	David V Forster	Forster Stable/R, A & V Chan	1:50.61
2000	Magic Code	5	Gary Baze	David V Forster	Forster Stable/R, A & V Chan	1:50.69
2001	Grey Tobe Free	4	Chris Loseth	Robert Anderson	Red Rock Farm	1:49.74
2002	Grace For You	3	Fernando Serra	John Terry Marshall	Dennis Draman	1:52.87
2003	Dancewithavixen	3	Felipe Valdez	Tom Longstaff	TNT Racing Stable	1:52.58
2004	See Me Through	3	Pedro Alvarado	Cindy Krasner	Michael Jawl	1:51.42
2005	Monashee	3	Justin Stein	L Tracy McCarthy	Canmor Farms	1:50.40
2006	Gins Majesty	4	Kevin Krigger	Tim McCanna	Quadrun Farm	1:52.80
2007	Monashee	5	David Wilson	L Tracy McCarthy	Canmor Farms	1:50.64
2008	Against The Sky	6	Frank Perez Fuentes	Craig McPherson	Arindel	1:51.00
2009	Holy Nova	5	Mario Gutierrez	Troy Taylor	Glen Todd	1:52.37
2010	Kaweah Princess	4	Pedro Alvarado	Rob Gilker	Very Un Stable	1:50.53
2011	Orchids Silver	5	Isaias Cardenas	Lenore Dubois	Nick & Pauline Felicella	1:50.30
2012	Class Included	4	Russell Baze	Jim Penney	Michael & Amy Feuerborn	1:49.30
2013	Madeira Park	4	Rico Walcott	David V Forster	Exclusive Stable & Ray Hanson	1:50.26
2014	Touching Promise	4	Mario Gutierrez	Barbara Heads	Russell & Lois Bennett	1:51:18
2015	Touching Promise	4	Amadeo Perez	Barbara Heads	Russell & Lois Bennett	1:49.78
2016	Snuggles	3	Rico Walcott	Dino Condilenios	Swift Thoroughbreds	1:50.26
2017	Notis The Jewell	4	Richard Harvey Hamel	William McLaren	William McLaren	1:51.64
2018	Victress	5	Amadeo Perez	Robert Gilker	Victoria & Robert Gilker	1:50.38
2019	Here's Hannah	4	Richard Harvey Hamel	John Morrison	B-C Stables	1:49.91
2022	Infinite Patience	5	Antonio Ambrosio Reyes	Barbara Heads	William Decoursey and R. N. H. Stable	1:49.34
2023	Infinite Patience	6	Antonio Ambrosio Reyes	Barbara Heads	William Decoursey and R. N. H. Stable	1:49.48
2024	Infinite Patience	7	Antonio Ambrosio Reyes	Barbara Heads	William Decoursey and R. N. H. Stable	1:51.38

== Earlier winners ==
- 1969 - Nanahanna
- 1970 -
- 1971 -
- 1972 -
- 1973 -
- 1974 -
- 1975 - Pirate Queen
- 1976 - Savanna Blue Jeans
- 1977 - Reasonable Win
- 1978 - Title Victory
- 1979 - Tolita
- 1980 - Three Leaders
- 1981 - Gray On Gray
- 1982 - Belle of Rainier
- 1983 - Okan Dee Select
- 1984 - Unknown
- 1985 - Gallant Pearl
- 1986 - Royal Garter
- 1987 - Cruisin Two Su
- 1988 - Delta Colleen
- 1989 -
- 1990 -
- 1991 - Avants Gold
- 1992 - Delta Colleen
- 1993 - Pilgrims Treasure
- 1994 - Above The Table
- 1995 - Sophie J
- 1996 - Kims Turn To Star
- 1997 - Ever Lasting

== See also ==
- List of Canadian flat horse races
