= Clay Puett =

American inventor (1899–1998)

(Hoyt) Clay Puett (born 1899 Chillicothe, Texas – 1998) was the inventor of the enclosed electric starting gate used at all major thoroughbred race tracks around the world. On July 1, 1939, Puett's invention made its debut at Exhibition Park Race Track, Vancouver, British Columbia. It was an immediate success. By the end of 1940, Puett's gate was a fixture at all major North American race tracks.

Prior to Puett's invention, races were commonly started with ropes, ribbons, or wooden barriers. As a young man, Puett had worked as a rider, as well as a starter, and knew of the dangers that were associated with these methods for starting a race. He began work on a prototype of his invention in 1931, while working as a starter in Greeley, Colorado. Puett's company, True Center Gate in Phoenix, Arizona, still manufactures gates for the racing industry, and an award bearing Puett's name is given to innovators in racing by the University of Arizona's yearly Symposium on Racing.

== Fame ==
His vital contribution to the sport of horse racing is noted in such publications as "Horse Racing's Top 100 Moments", Sports Illustrated, and The Blood Horse, as well as being the subject of numerous documentaries and news articles. He is also featured in an exhibit in the Kentucky Derby Museum, in Louisville, Kentucky. In 1988, Puett was featured as part of a question on the game show Jeopardy!
