= Jammed Lovely Stakes =

- Class: Restricted
- Location: Woodbine Racetrack; Toronto, Ontario, Canada
- Inaugurated: 1981
- Race type: Thoroughbred - Flat racing
- Website: www.woodbineentertainment.com/qct/default.asp

Race information
- Distance: 7 furlongs
- Surface: Polytrack
- Track: left-handed
- Qualification: Three-year-old fillies foaled in Ontario
- Weight: Assigned
- Purse: CA$115,458 (2016)

The Jammed Lovely Stakes is a Canadian Thoroughbred horse race run annually in mid November at Woodbine Racetrack in Toronto, Ontario, Canada. Restricted to three-year-old fillies foaled in the Province of Ontario, it is contested on Polytrack synthetic dirt at a distance of seven furlongs.

Inaugurated at Toronto's now defunct Greenwood Raceway in 1981, it was raced there through 1993 after which it was moved to the Woodbine facility. The race was named for the filly, Jammed Lovely, a Canadian Horse Racing Hall of Fame inductee, and Queen's Plate winner. The horse was owned by Conn Smythe, owner of the Toronto Maple Leafs professional ice hockey team and stable owner. After Smythe died in 1980, the horses of his stable were sold except for Jammed Lovely, his favourite horse and the new Jammed Lovely Stakes was inaugurated.

The race is now run earlier on the calendar. In 2016, it ran in the first week of September. The race was run in two divisions in 1991.

== Records ==
Speed record: (Through 1998, Woodbine times were recorded in fifths of a second. Since 1999 they are in hundredths of a second)

- 1:21.75 - Ginger Brew (2008)

Most wins by an owner:

- 3 - Sam-Son Farm (1985, 1988, 2006)

Most wins by a jockey:

- 4 - Sandy Hawley (1988, 1990, 1992, 1996)
- 4 - Todd Kabel (1994, 2004, 2005, 2006)

Most wins by a trainer:

- 4 - Roger Attfield (1983, 1993, 2001, 2016, 2017)

== Winners ==
Year	Winner	Jockey	Trainer	Owner	Time
2017	Ghostly Presence	Rafael Hernandez	Roger Attfield	Chiefswood Stable	1:23.98
2016	Calling Rhy Rhy	Alan Garcia	Roger Attfield	Robert Harvey	1:22.59
2015	Strong Incentive	Alan Garcia	Chad C. Brown	Klaravich Stables/Lawrence	1:22.36
2014	Executive Allure	Jesse M. Campbell	Darwin Banach	William A. Sorokolit Sr.	1:21.80
2013	Coachella Valley	Emma-Jayne Wilson	Reade Baker	Jus Luk Stable	1:23.96
2012	Blue Heart	Luis Contreras	Brian A. Lynch	Amerman Racing (Jerry & Joan Amerman)	1:23.93
2011	Athena Rose	Steve Bahen	Glenn Magnusson	Patricia & Robert Weber	1:23.46
2010	Euro Platinum	Jono Jones	Audre Cappuccitti	Audre Cappuccitti	1:22.94
2009	Carem Crescent	Eurico Rosa Da Silva	Malcolm Pierce	Melnyk Racing Stables	1:22.18
2008	Ginger Brew	Patrick Husbands	Brian A. Lynch	Stronach Stables	1:21.75
2007	Dance to My Tune	Constant Montpellier	David Cotey	Dominion Bloodstock et al.	1:23.27
2006	Strike Softly	Todd Kabel	Mark Frostad	Sam-Son Farm	1:24.51
2005	Charming Ruckus	Todd Kabel	Malcolm Pierce	Windways Farm & Quinn Stable	1:23.49
2004	Financingavailable	Todd Kabel	Lorne Richards	K. K. Sangara	1:23.12
2003	Willow Bunch	Patrick Husbands	Josie Carroll	James & Alice Sapara	1:25.02
2002	Spanish Decree	Constant Montpellier	Frank Huarte	Frank Huarte	1:24.52
2001	Poetically	David Clark	Roger Attfield	Kinghaven Farms	1:23.99
2000	Mysterious Affair	Richard Dos Ramos	Mort Hardy	Mort Hardy	1:23.60
1999	Bag Lady Jane	Robert Landry	Tino Attard	Stronach Stables	1:23.13
1998	Social Director	Na Somsanith	Macdonald Benson	Windfields Farm	1:24.40
1997	Rare Executive	Neil Poznansky	Robert P. Tiller	F. Di Giulio/F. Di Giulio Jr./Norseman	1:23.40
1996	Ashboro	Sandy Hawley	Alexander F. McPherson	Beclawat Stable	1:24.40
1995	Lynclar	James McAleney	John A. Ross	RMC Stable	1:23.20
1994	Mysteriously	Todd Kabel	Daniel J. Vella	Frank Stronach	1:24.80
1993	Hey Hazel	Don Seymour	Roger Attfield	M. Canino	1:25.40
1992	Myrtle Irene	Sandy Hawley	David C. Brown	Mr. & Mrs. D. McClelland	1:24.40
1991	A Gal For Gordo	Sidney Fenech	Alex Bankuti	Tibor I. Bankuti	1:26.60
1991	Bees 'N' Honey	Daniel J. David	Stephen Barnes	Big Bux Stable	1:26.20
1990	Cody Kossou	Sandy Hawley	Joe Sztaba	Shaker Stable	1:26.20
1989	Persian Oak	Larry Attard	Danny O'Callaghan	Taylor Stable	1:25.40
1988	Sound The Fanfare	Sandy Hawley	James E. Day	Sam-Son Farm	1:29.60
1987	Miss R. Regent	Paul Ravera	John Mack	G. & H. Andreadis/Clarkson	1:27.40
1986	Artic Mistral	Jack Lauzon	Grant Pearce	Windways/Loftus/Rachalin	1:27.60
1985	Queen Of Egypt	Robin Platts	James E. Day	Sam-Son Farm	1:26.80
1984	Haliburton Forest	Robert King, Jr.	Glenn Magnusson	G. Vasey & D. Finn	1:27.80
1983	Regents Rhythm	David Clark	Roger Attfield	Anderson Farms	1:29.20
1982	Miss Hyperion	Richard Dos Ramos	Cliff C. Hopmans	Gardiner Farms	1:25.60
1981	Muskoka Weekend	Robin Platts	Michael J. Doyle	Eaton Hall Farm	1:26.20
