= Hugo Dittfach =

Canadian jockey (1936–2021)

Personal information
- Born: 20 September 1936 Leer, Ostfriesland, Nazi Germany
- Died: 1 November 2021 (aged 85) Beaverton, Ontario, Canada
- Occupations: Jockey, Trainer

Horse racing career
- Sport: Horse racing
- Career wins: 4,000

Major racing wins
- Canadian Classic Race wins: Queen's Plate (1961); Prince of Wales Stakes (1960, 1962, 1963, 1966, 1967); Breeders' Stakes (1958)

Racing awards
- Canadian Champion Jockey by Wins (1965); Sovereign Award for Outstanding Jockey (1975); Avelino Gomez Memorial Award (1991)

Honours
- Canadian Horse Racing Hall of Fame (1983); Halton Hills Sports Museum Hall of Fame (2017)

Significant horses
- Anita's Son, Blue Light, Wonder Where

Hugo Dittfach (20 September 1936 – 1 November 2021) was a Canadian jockey. Dittfach survived three years as a boy in a Soviet internment camp in Poland during and after World War II and went on to become a national champion thoroughbred racing jockey in Canada, where he was inducted into the Canadian Horse Racing Hall of Fame in 1983 and the Halton Hills Sports Museum Hall of Fame in 2017.
