= Canadian Champion Female Sprint Horse =

Canadian Thoroughbred horse racing honor

The Canadian Champion Female Sprint Horse is a Canadian Thoroughbred horse racing honor that is part of the Sovereign Awards program awarded annually to the top female Thoroughbred horse competing in sprint races in Canada. Created in 1980 by the Jockey Club of Canada as a single award for Champion Sprinter, it was split into male and female categories in 2009.

== Past winners ==
- 2009: Tribal Belle
- 2010: Indian Apple Is
- 2011: Atlantic Hurricane
- 2012: Roxy Gap
- 2013: Youcan'tcatchme
- 2014: Hillaby
- 2015: Miss Mischief
- 2016: River Maid
- 2017: Ami's Mesa
- 2018: Moonlit Promise
- 2019: Summer Sunday
- 2020: Artie's Princess
- 2021: Amalfi Coast
- 2022: Hazelbrook
- 2023: Loyalty
- 2024: Play the Music
