= Eurico Rosa da Silva =

Brazilian jockey (born 1975)

- Eurico Rosa da Silva at Woodbine, June 2012

Personal information
- Born: June 29, 1975 (age 51) Buri, São Paulo, Brazil
- Occupation: Jockey

Horse racing career
- Sport: Horse racing
- Career wins: 2286

Major racing wins
- Grande Prêmio Derby Paulista (1994); Dance Smartly Stakes (2004); Ontario Fashion Stakes (2005); Bessarabian Stakes (2007); Ontario Derby (2007, 2013); Bold Venture Stakes (2008, 2009); Hendrie Stakes (2008); Kentucky Cup Distaff Stakes (2008); Kentucky Cup Sprint Stakes (2008); Nassau Stakes (2008, 2017); New Providence Stakes (2008); Royal North Stakes (2008); South Ocean Stakes (2008, 2016); Whimsical Stakes (2008, 2017); Summer Stakes (2008); Plate Trial Stakes (2009); Phoenix Stakes (2009); Mazarine Stakes (2009); Display Stakes (2009); Jammed Lovely Stakes (2009); Star Shoot Stakes (2010); Northern Dancer Turf Stakes (2013); Woodbine Oaks (2016 - 2018); Canadian International Stakes (2017); Woodbine Mile Stakes (2019) Canadian Triple Crown wins: Queen's Plate (2009, 2010); Breeders' Stakes (2013)

Racing awards
- Sovereign Award for Outstanding Jockey (2010, 2013, 2015, 2016, 2017, 2018, 2019)

Honours
- Avelino Gomez Memorial Award (2021)

Significant horses
- Big Red Mike, Bullards Alley, El Tormenta, Eye of the Leopard, Up With The Birds, Pink Lloyd, Dixie Moon, Melmich, Pumpkin Rumble, Moonlit Promise

Eurico Rosa da Silva (Brazilian Portuguese: [ewˈɾiku ˈʁɔzɐ da ˈsiwvɐ]; born June 29, 1975, in Buri, São Paulo, Brazil) is a retired Thoroughbred racing jockey who raced for five years in his native Brazil and another four years in Macau before coming to Woodbine Racetrack in Toronto, Ontario. While based in Canada, he also won races in the United States.

Silva got his first Canadian Triple Crown win in 2009 when he rode Eye of the Leopard to victory in the Queen's Plate, and won that race again in 2010 aboard Big Red Mike. Among his other successes, in 2016 he won the Woodbine Oaks, riding Neshama. In 2017, he won the Canadian International Stakes riding Bullards Alley. In 2019, he won the Woodbine Mile with El Tormenta.

Eurico Rosa da Silva retired at the end of the 2019 racing season having won 2,286 races. Six times he was voted the Sovereign Award for Canada's Outstanding Jockey. He received the award for a seventh time in 2019.

For his significant contributions to the sport of Thoroughbred racing, Eurico Rosa da Silva was the 2021 recipient of the Avelino Gomez Memorial Award.

== Autobiography ==
On December 1, 2020, Eurico Rosa da Silva's autobiography titled "Riding for Freedom" was published. The book, containing what TSN described as having "many shocking revelations," recounts his rise to the top levels of Thoroughbred racing while struggling with the effects of a verbally abusive and negligent father which had at times led him to the brink of taking his own life.

Chart (2007–present)	Peak position
National Earnings List for Jockeys 2007	73
National Earnings List for Jockeys 2008	31
National Earnings List for Jockeys 2009	27
National Earnings List for Jockeys 2010	12
National Earnings List for Jockeys 2011	22
National Earnings List for Jockeys 2012	19
National Earnings List for Jockeys 2013	19
National Earnings List for Jockeys 2014	24
National Earnings List for Jockeys 2015	22
National Earnings List for Jockeys 2016	26
