= Don Seymour =

Canadian jockey (1961–2020)

Personal information
- Born: 1961 Hamilton, Ontario, Canada
- Died: 26 June 2020 (aged 58) Barrie, Ontario, Canada
- Occupation: Jockey

Horse racing career
- Sport: Horse racing
- Career wins: 2,138

Major racing wins
- Canadian Triple Crown (1989, 1990); Plate Trial Stakes (1989, 1990, 1991); Queen's Plate (1989, 1990); Prince of Wales Stakes (1989, 1990); Breeders' Stakes (1989, 1990, 1992); Molson Export Million (1990); Jammed Lovely Stakes (1993)

Racing awards
- Sovereign Award for Outstanding Jockey (1985, 1987, 1989, 1990); Avelino Gomez Memorial Award (1995)

Honours
- Canadian Horse Racing Hall of Fame (1999)

Significant horses
- With Approval, Term Limits, Carotene, Izvestia, Play The King, Alywow
- Updated on February 8, 2007

Donald J. Seymour (1961 – 26 June 2020) was a Canadian jockey in Thoroughbred horse racing who is the only jockey in history to win two Canadian Triple Crowns.

Born in Hamilton, Ontario and raised in Etobicoke, Ontario, Don Seymour began his professional racing career riding in Western Canada. From 1981 to 1986 he was the leading rider in Alberta. In 1988, he finished second aboard Play The King in the Breeders' Cup Sprint. In 1989 he signed on with Kinghaven Farms where that year he teamed up with trainer Roger Attfield to become the first in twenty-six years to capture Canada's Triple Crown series. Following their 1989 Triple Crown with the colt With Approval, in 1990 they repeated the feat with Izvestia, an achievement that has never been equalled.

Don Seymour retired in 1994 having won the Sovereign Award as Canada's top jockey a record four times. In 1995 he was voted the Avelino Gomez Memorial Award in recognition of his significant contribution to the sport of horse racing. In 1999, he was inducted into the Canadian Horse Racing Hall of Fame.

He died on 26 June 2020, at the age of 58, from complications of chronic obstructive pulmonary disease (COPD).
