= Justin Stein (jockey) =

Justin Stein (born 1979 or 1980) is a former Canadian thoroughbred racing jockey who competed between the 2000s to 2020s. As an apprentice jockey, Stein held Hastings Racecourse records during 2005. He won 16 Grade III races as a graded stakes races jockey. Stein also had seven Grade II and three Grade I victories.

Stein won four events each in the Canadian Triple Crown of Thoroughbred Racing events and Canadian Triple Tiara of Thoroughbred Racing. After ending his career in 2024, he won 1,440 races and accumulated over $64 million in prize winnings. Stein received multiple nominations for the Sovereign Award for Outstanding Apprentice Jockey and the Sovereign Award for Outstanding Jockey. He was also an Eclipse Award for Outstanding Apprentice Jockey during 2005. Stein joined the Ontario Racing Commission in 2025.

== Early life and education ==
Stein was born in Barriere, British Columbia in 1979 or 1980. As a toddler, he became interested in horses. Throughout his childhood, Stein primarily worked in horse management. He also had an off-grid upbringing. As a teenager, Stein declined a horse racing career. He went to the University College of the Cariboo for culinary arts during the 2000s.

== Career ==
=== Early career ===
Stein was "a line cook at Sun Peaks Resort" throughout the early 2000s. By 2003, Stein had started his forest firefighting career. The following year, Stein worked in Kamloops and at Hastings Racecourse as an exercise rider.

While at Hastings, Stein had his first victories as an apprentice jockey during 2004. He held the "Hastings [season records] for wins by an apprentice jockey" and "money won by an apprentice rider" in 2005. That year, Stein briefly raced at Woodbine Racetrack and had the most Hastings victories. Stein left Hastings for Woodbine in 2006. His apprenticeship experience ended that year.

=== 2010s to 2020s ===
During the Canadian Triple Crown of Thoroughbred Racing, Stein won the Queen's Plate in 2012. He was first at the Prince of Wales Stakes during 2022 and 2023. Stein also had a victory at the 2024 Breeders' Stakes.

As part of the Canadian Triple Tiara of Thoroughbred Racing, Stein won the Bison City Stakes in 2014. He was first at the Woodbine Oaks the following year. During 2021, Stein won the Woodbine Oaks and the Wonder Where Stakes. He did not have a spot in that year's Bison City Stakes.

During his time period, Stein had his 1000th career victory in 2015. He decided to become a goat farmer and take care of his children during 2016. Stein's farming experience continued before he restarted racing in 2019. The following year, he was runner-up for the most season wins at Woodbine.

Leading up to 2023, Stein won 16 Grade III races as a graded stakes races jockey. He also had victories in seven Grade II and three Grade I graded stakes races. Stein started planning to leave horse racing in September 2024. He injured his rib and vertebrae during his last race in November 2024. In 2025, Stein was "an Ontario Racing Commission steward."

== Honours and overall performance ==
Stein was nominated for the 2005 Eclipse Award for Outstanding Apprentice Jockey. For the Sovereign Award for Outstanding Apprentice Jockey, he received nominations in 2005 and 2006. Stein was a nominee for the 2013 Sovereign Award for Outstanding Jockey. He received additional Outstanding Jockey nominations as part of the Sovereign Awards for 2020 and 2021.

In Equibase ranks for North American races, Stein's best earnings finish was 29th place during 2012. His highest finish in wins was 38th place during 2020. After ending his career, Stein won 1,440 races and accumulated over $64 million in prize winnings.

== Personal life ==
Stein had four children during his marriage. During the 2020s, he had one child during a different marriage.
