= Sovereign Award =

Canadian horse racing awards

The Sovereign Award is given annually since 1975 by the Jockey Club of Canada to the outstanding horses and people in Canadian Thoroughbred racing.

The most prestigious award for horses is Sovereign Horse of the Year.

The equivalent in Australia is the Australian Thoroughbred racing awards, in the United States the Eclipse Awards, and in Europe, the Cartier Racing Awards.

Sovereign Awards are currently given to the:

- Canadian Horse of the Year.
- Canadian Champion Two-Year-Old Filly
- Canadian Champion Two-Year-Old Colt
- Canadian Champion Three-Year-Old Filly
- Canadian Champion Three-Year-Old Male Horse
- Canadian Champion Older Male Horse
- Canadian Champion Older Female Horse
- Canadian Champion Male Turf Horse
- Canadian Champion Female Turf Horse
- Canadian Champion Sprint Horse (1980–2008)
- Canadian Champion Male Sprint Horse (2009–present)
- Canadian Champion Female Sprint Horse (2009–present)
- Sovereign Award for Outstanding Breeder
- Sovereign Award for Outstanding Broodmare
- Outstanding Jockey
- Outstanding Apprentice Jockey
- Outstanding Owner
- Outstanding Trainer
- Outstanding Newspaper Article
- Outstanding Feature Article
- Outstanding Photograph
- Outstanding Film/Video/Broadcast
