= Jockey Club of Canada =

Former Canadian jockey club

The Jockey Club of Canada was formed in 1973 to oversee thoroughbred horse racing in Canada. Based in Toronto, Ontario, the club is responsible for the annual Sovereign Awards program and the Canadian Graded Stakes Committee.

Founding members:

- Colonel Charles "Bud" Baker
- Douglas Banks
- Warren Beasley
- Richard A. N. Bonnycastle
- Charles F. W. Burns
- Arthur B. Christopher
- Harry J. Carmichael
- George C. Frostad
- George R. Gardiner
- W. Preston Gilbride
- Caryl Nicholas Charles Hardinge, 4th Viscount Hardinge
- George C. Hendrie
- Charles John "Jack" Jackson
- Sydney J. "Jim" Langill
- Richard R. Kennedy
- Jean-Louis Levesque
- Frank M. McMahon
- John Angus "Bud" McDougald
- J. E. Frowde Seagram
- Frank H. Sherman
- Conn Smythe
- E. P. Taylor
- Donald G. "Bud" Willmot

== Canadian Graded Stakes Committee ==
Each year, the Club's Canadian Graded Stakes Committee meets to review open Thoroughbred horse races. To be eligible for graded stakes race status, a race must offer a minimum purse in an amount determined by the Committee. As at 2008, there are thirty-seven Canadian graded stakes races of which all but five are run at Toronto's Woodbine Racetrack.
