= Hastings Racecourse =

Casino and former racecourse in Vancouver, Canada

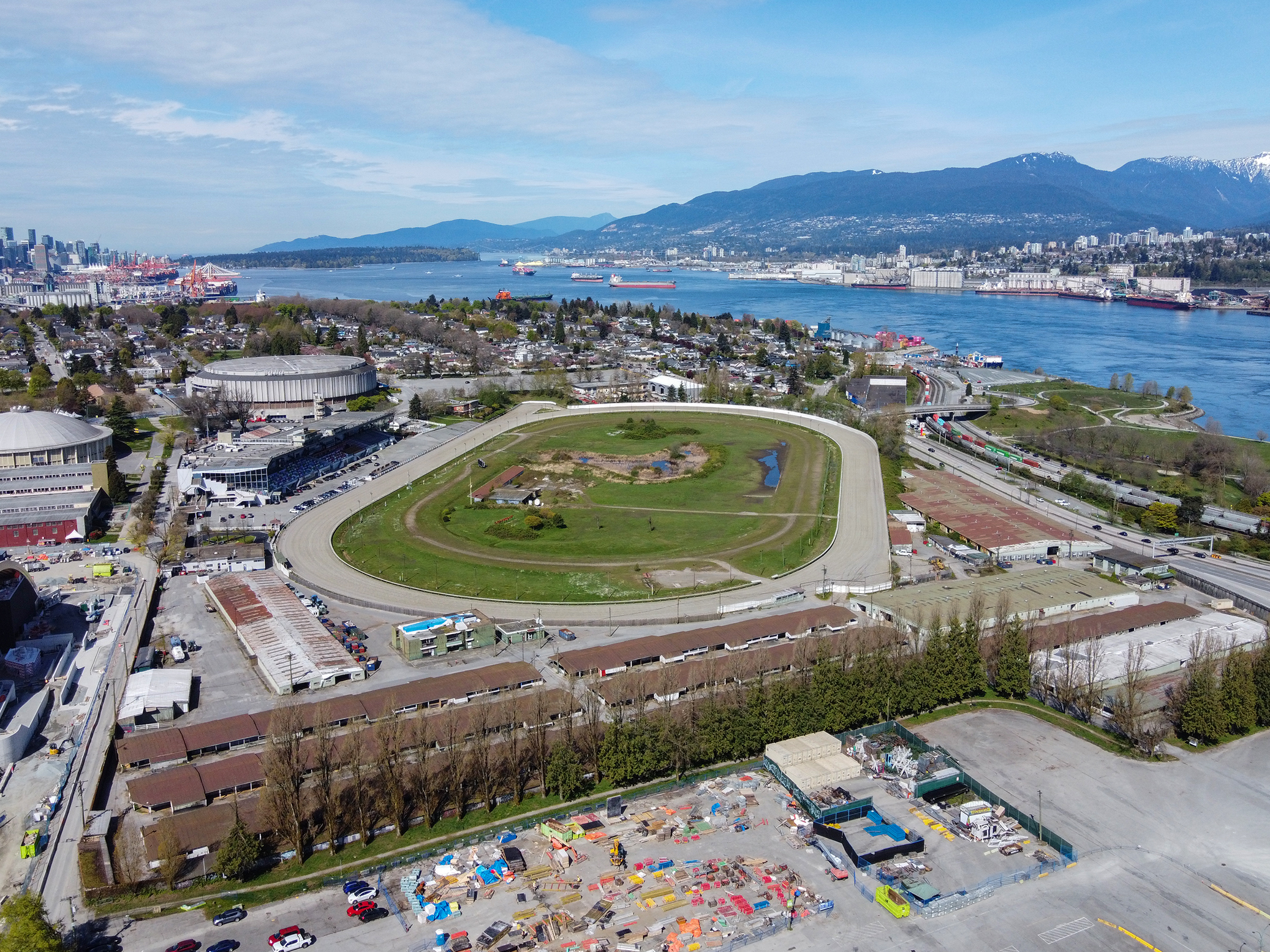
- Hastings Racecourse aerial view in 2026
- Interactive map of Hastings Racecourse
- Location: 188 N. Renfrew St., Vancouver, British Columbia, Canada V5K 3N8
- Coordinates: 49°17′12″N 123°02′22″W
- Owned by: Great Canadian Entertainment
- Date opened: 1889; 137 years ago
- Date closed: December 5, 2025; 8 months ago
- Race type: Thoroughbred racing
- Course type: Flat five furlongs
- Notable races: Lieutenant Governors Stakes, British Columbia Derby, British Columbia Premier's Handicap, Ballerina Stakes, British Columbia Oaks, Fantasy Stakes, Ascot Graduation Stakes

Hastings Racecourse is a casino and former thoroughbred horse racing facility at Hastings Park, British Columbia, Canada, 6 kilometres (4 mi) from Downtown Vancouver. Originally called East Park, it opened for business in 1889, making it Vancouver's longest continuously used professional sports facility until the track's closure in 2025.

The property is operated by Great Canadian Gaming Corporation, which acquired the lease of the city-owned track in 2004. In June 2025, Great Canadian reached an agreement to sell Hastings' casino operations to the Tsleil-Waututh First Nation.

On December 11, 2025, the city of Vancouver announced that it had provisionally approved plans to build a new soccer-specific stadium at the site of the former racecourse. The stadium will serve as the home of Vancouver Whitecaps FC, a club in Major League Soccer. The agreement will still need to be approved by the Vancouver City Council.

== History ==
The track was originally known as Exhibition Park Race Track, but has always been referred to by the public and the media as Exhibition Park. July 1, 1939 marked the first time thoroughbred racing used an electric starting gate, the invention of Texan Clay Puett.

Following Canada's declaration of war on Imperial Japan in 1942, Hastings Racecourse was used to house and process Japanese Canadians before being sent to internment camps in the interior of British Columbia.

On the first Monday in August, a public holiday, the track hosts BC Cup Day that features a series of six races for top Thoroughbreds in various classes. In September, the two most important races for three-year-olds in British Columbia, the British Columbia Oaks and the British Columbia Derby, are run at Hastings Racecourse.

On May 18, 2011, the course was reported to be closed at the end of its 2012 lease due to low profits from wagering revenue and slots, as well as difficulty reaching an agreeable new lease with the city. A decision by Great Canadian had to be made by October 31 of that year. The result of those negotiations was that the track remained open and running.

In 2012, Hastings Racecourse made international headlines when little-known Mexican-born jockey Mario Gutierrez (who had emigrated to Canada in 2006 and begun riding at Hastings, winning the track's riding titles in 2007 and 2008), won the Santa Anita Derby, the Kentucky Derby, and the Preakness Stakes aboard I'll Have Another.

=== Closure of racetrack ===
On November 27, 2025, the local Horsemen's Benevolent and Protective Association (HBPA) representing racing interests at Hastings was notified by British Columbia Solicitor General Nina Krieger that slot machine subsidies to Hastings' racing operations would stop at the end of January 2026. One week later, on December 5, 2025, Hastings Racecourse management announced the end of live thoroughbred racing, with the casino remaining operational. A spokesperson for Great Canadian Entertainment said that the decision to discontinue racing was "extremely difficult" but "strictly a business decision" given the economic circumstances. The head of the local HBPA, David Milburn, said that removing slot subsidies was a "breach of trust" and that they had begun efforts to convince the provincial government to change their minds.

A few days later, on December 11, 2025, the city of Vancouver announced that it had provisionally approved plans to build a new stadium for Vancouver Whitecaps FC. The club, which currently plays at BC Place, is forced to share with the BC Lions of the CFL. Getting their own stadium will grant the club additional control over ground operations.

== Graded events ==
These Grade III events were held at Hastings Racecourse in 2019:

- British Columbia Derby
- Ballerina Stakes
- BC Premier's Handicap

== Gallery ==
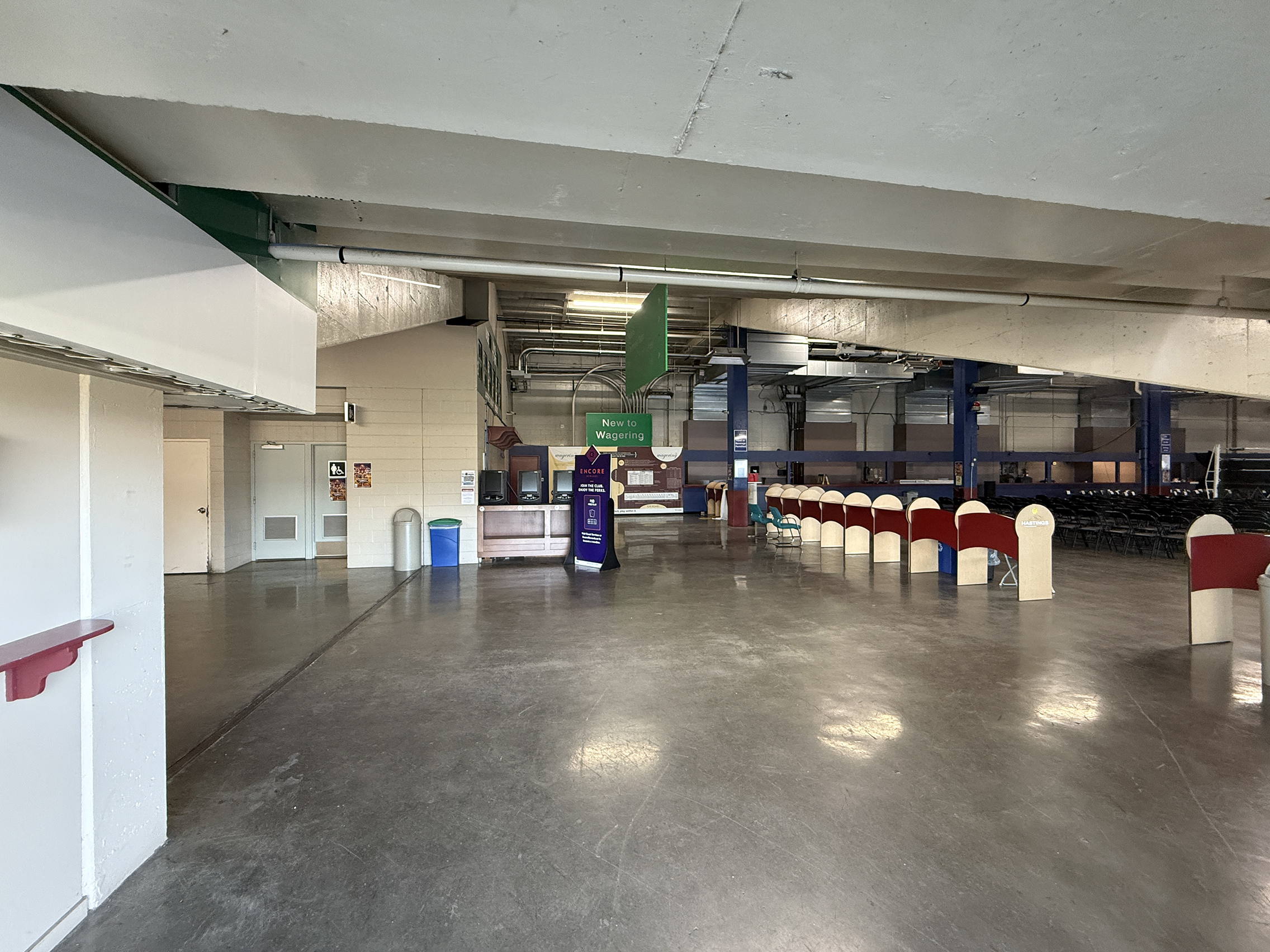
Farrier paid zone

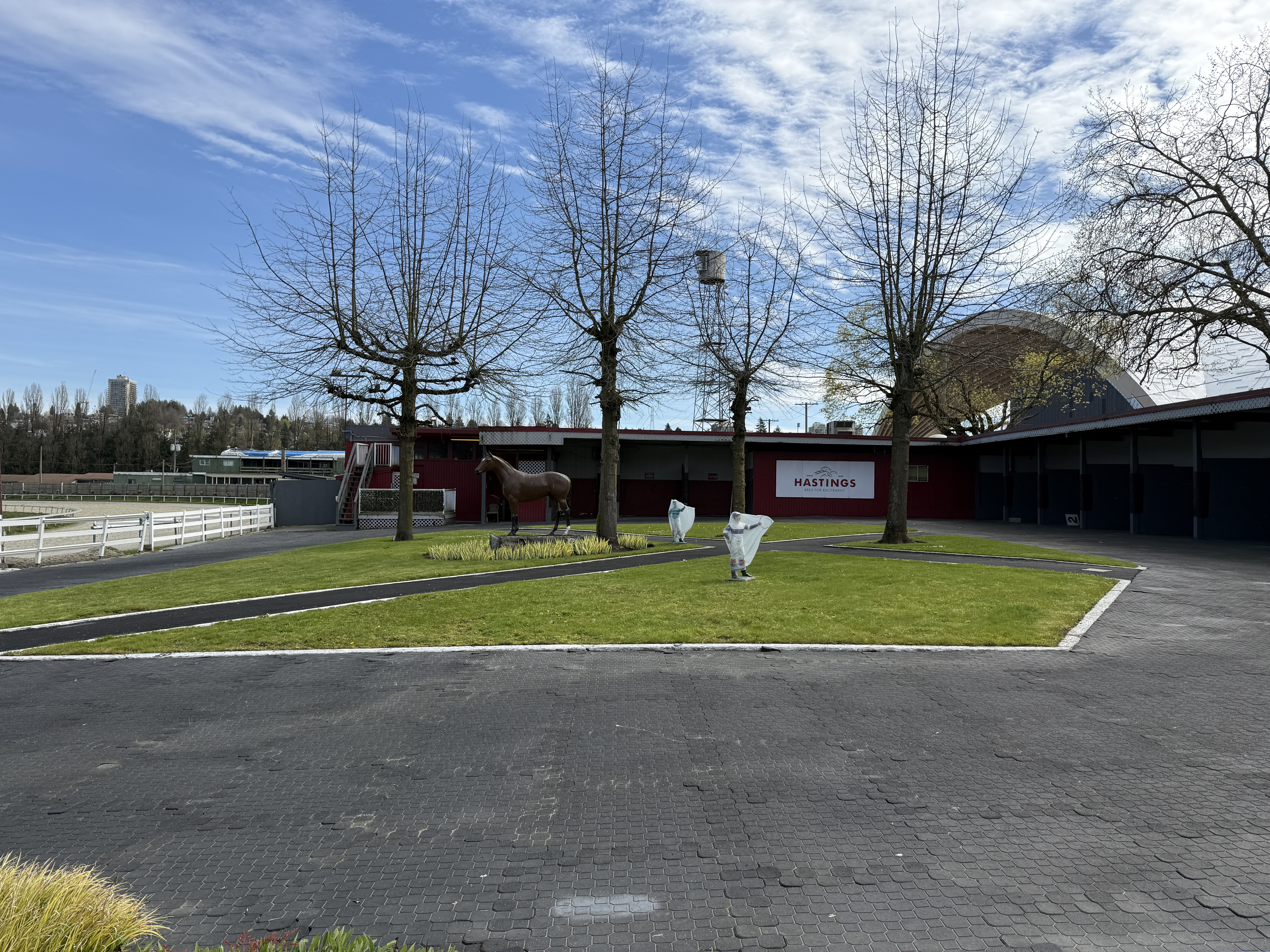
Walking ring
