= John B. LeBlanc =

Canadian jockey

John LeBlanc
Personal information
- Born: November 23, 1939 (age 86) Rogersville, New Brunswick
- Occupation: Jockey

Horse racing career
- Sport: Horse racing
- Career wins: 1,466

Major racing wins
- Grey Stakes (1964); Colin Stakes (1965, 1970, 1972); Cup and Saucer Stakes (1965, 1971); Display Stakes (1965); Highlander Stakes (1965); Nassau Stakes (1965, 1975); Eclipse Stakes (1969); King Edward Handicap (1969, 1970); Shady Well Stakes (1970); My Dear Stakes (1972); Princess Elizabeth Stakes (1972); Toronto Cup (1972); Victoria Stakes (1972); Colin Stakes (1972); Frizette Stakes (1972); Gardenia Stakes (1972); Selima Stakes (1972); Matron Stakes (1972); Spinaway Stakes (1972); Schuylerville Stakes (1972); La Troienne Stakes (1973); Quebec Derby (1973); Maple Leaf Stakes (1974, 1979); Selene Stakes (1976); Victoriana Stakes (1976); Connaught Cup Stakes (1977); Ontario Damsel Stakes (1979); Wonder Where Stakes (1979); Dominion Day Stakes (1980) Canadian Classic Race wins: Breeders' Stakes (1968, 1969); Prince of Wales Stakes (1972, 1984)

Racing awards
- Avelino Gomez Memorial Award (2006)

Significant horses
- Angle Light, Fanfreluche, Glorious Song, Kennedy Road, La Prevoyante, Presidial, Titled Hero

Jean (John) B. LeBlanc (born November 23, 1939, in Rogersville, New Brunswick) is a Canadian retired jockey in Thoroughbred horse racing. He competed at many of the top racetracks in the United States but for most of his career was based in Ontario where he was commonly known as John, the English language translation for his name.

LeBlanc is best known for riding Jean-Louis Lévesque's La Prevoyante through an undefeated 1972 campaign in North America. An inductee in both the Canadian Horse Racing Hall of Fame and U.S. Racing Hall of Fame, the filly won all twelve of her starts under LeBlanc en route to be voted the 1972 Eclipse Award as American Champion Two-Year-Old Filly, the National Turf Writers Association's U.S. Horse of the Year and the Sovereign Award as the Canadian Horse of the Year.

== Canadian and U.S. Triple Crown ==
A winner of 1,466 races during his career, John LeBlanc was the jockey chosen by trainer Lucien Laurin to ride Angle Light, Secretariat's entrymate in the 1973 Kentucky Derby. Among his other career highlights, LeBlanc won four Canadian Triple Crown races, taking back-to-back runnings of the Breeders' Stakes in 1968 and 1969 and the Prince of Wales Stakes in 1972 and 1984.

In 2006, LeBlanc received the Avelino Gomez Memorial Award, an honor given to a jockey in Canada who has made a significant contribution to the sport of Thoroughbred horse racing.
