= L'Alezane =

Canadian Thoroughbred racehorse

- Sire: Dr. Fager
- Grandsire: Rough'n Tumble
- Dam: Northern Willow
- Damsire: Northern Dancer
- Sex: Filly
- Foaled: 1975
- Country: Canada
- Colour: Chestnut
- Breeder: E. P. Taylor
- Owner: Jean-Louis Levesque
- Trainer: Yonnie Starr
- Record: 37: 12-7-6
- Earnings: $367,307

Major wins
- Alcibiades Stakes (1977); Adirondack Stakes (1977); Schuylerville Stakes (1977); Princess Elizabeth Stakes (1977); Shady Well Stakes (1977); Winnipeg Futurity (1977); Selene Stakes (1978)

Awards
- Canadian Champion Two-Year-Old Filly (1977); Canadian Horse of the Year (1977)

L'Alezane (1975–1979) was a Canadian Champion Thoroughbred racehorse. The daughter of U.S. Racing Hall of Fame inductee Dr. Fager, her dam, Northern Willow, was a daughter of breeder E. P. Taylor's great international sire, Northern Dancer.

L'Alezane was purchased as a yearling by prominent Quebec businessman and major Thoroughbred racing stable owner, Jean-Louis Levesque. Conditioned for racing by future Canadian Horse Racing Hall of Fame trainer Yonnie Starr, at age two L'Alezane followed a similar path as owner Levesque's U.S & Canadian Hall of Fame filly La Prevoyante had undertaken three years earlier by competing in both Canada and the United States. A winner of three important stakes races in each country, L'Alezane's 1977 performances earned her the Canadian Champion Two-Year-Old Filly title, and joined La Prevoyante in being voted Canadian Horse of the Year honors.

Much was expected of L'Alezane at age three but she did not achieve the results anticipated. Although she did win the Selene Stakes, she finished second in Canada's top race for three-year-old fillies, the Woodbine Oaks, and was third in a field with colts in her country's most prestigious race, the Queen's Plate.

L'Alezane returned to racing in 1979 but suffered an injury that led to the valuable future broodmare having to be euthanized.
