= Colin Stakes =

Horse race in Toronto, Ontario

- Class: Ungraded Stakes
- Location: Woodbine Racetrack; Toronto, Ontario, Canada
- Inaugurated: 1956
- Race type: Thoroughbred - Flat racing
- Website: woodbine.com

Race information
- Distance: 6 furlong sprint
- Surface: Polytrack
- Track: left-handed
- Qualification: Two-year-olds
- Weight: Allowances
- Purse: $95,800 (2016)

The Colin Stakes is a Canadian Thoroughbred horse race run annually during the later half of July at Woodbine Racetrack in Toronto, Ontario. Open to two-year-old horses, it is contested over a distance of 6 furlongs on Tapeta and currently carries a purse of $95,800.

Inaugurated in 1956 at Fort Erie Racetrack, the great filly La Prevoyante won the 1972 race by beating her male counterparts then went on to a career that would see her inducted in both the Canadian Horse Racing Hall of Fame and the U.S. Racing Hall of Fame. The 1982 edition was won by Sunny's Halo who won the following year's Kentucky Derby. In 2004, Francine Villeneuve became the first female jockey to win the race.

Since inception, the Colin Stakes has been run at various distances:

- 5 furlongs : 2006 at Woodbine Racetrack
- 5 1/2 furlongs : 1956–1957, 1959 at Fort Erie Racetrack
- 6 furlongs : 1958, 1960–1966 at Fort Erie Racetrack, 1980–2005, 2007 at Woodbine Racetrack
- 6 1/2 furlongs : 1967–1976 at Fort Erie Racetrack, 1977–1979 at Woodbine Racetrack

== Records ==
Speed record: (Through 1998, times were recorded in fifths of a second. Since 1999 they are in hundredths of a second)

- 1:09.44 - Riker (2015) (at current distance of 6 furlongs)

Most wins by an owner:

- 3 - Jean-Louis Levesque (1963, 1972, 1978)

Most wins by a jockey:

- 5 - David Clark (1983, 1984, 1987, 2005, 2011)

Most wins by a trainer:

- 3 - Daniel J. Vella (1994, 1995, 1997)

== Winners of the Colin Stakes ==
Year	Winner	Jockey	Trainer	Owner	Time
2016	Signature Spring	Rafael Manuel Hernandez	Sid C. Attard	Norseman Racing Stable	1:10.48
2015	Riker	Jesse M. Campbell	Nick Gonzalez	Tucci Stables	1:09.44
2014	Conquest Tsunami	Patrick Husbands	Mark Casse	Conquest Stable	1:10.22
2013	Go Greeley	Eurico Rosa Da Silva	John Ross	J.R. Racing Stable	1:10.19
2012	Joha	Justin Stein	Michael Maker	Wade M. Wacker	1:11.05
2011	Banner Bill	David Clark	Ralph J. Biamonte	R Plus Partners	1:11.12
2010	Glory Game	Patrick Husbands	Nicholas Gonzalez	Martha K. Gonzalez	1:09.93
2009	Fearless Cowboy	Slade Callaghan	Sandra Dominguez	D. Lanzman & J. Singer	1:10.88
2008	Southern Exchange	Jono Jones	Gregory De Gannes	Bill & Vicki Poston	1:10.74
2007	Bear Holiday	Jerry Baird	Reade Baker	Bear Stables	1:11.05
2006	Barilko	Constant Montpellier	David Dwyer	David Dwyer	0:57.11
2005	Edenwold	David Clark	Josie Carroll	Jim and Alice Sapara	1:11.04
2004	Wholelottabourbon	Francine Villeneuve	Nicholas Gonzalez	M.A.D. Racing/Gonzalez	1:11.19
2003	San Diego Blowout	Emile Ramsammy	Abraham Katryan	Kelynack Racing Stable	1:10.47
2002	Rights Reserved	Robert Landry	Gail Casselman	Casselman/John Mitchell	1:11.51
2001	Rum Splasher	Dino Luciani	Sean Hall	Hammett et al.	1:12.07
2000	Jet Drive	Patrick Husbands	Wray I. Lawrence	R. W. Pletan	1:10.30
1999	Vorticity	Slade Callaghan	Ross Armata	C.E.C. Farms	1:11.89
1998	Excess Thrilling	Jim McAleney	Grant Pearce	C. Scott Abbott	1:12.00
1997	Case Dismissed	Robert Landry	Daniel J. Vella	Andy Stronach	1:11.00
1996	Judith's Wild One	Slade Callaghan	Conrad Cohen	Tenenbaum Racing	1:10.40
1995	Miners Mirage	Sandy Hawley	Daniel J. Vella	Frank Stronach	1:11.40
1994	Chip N Charge	Jack M. Lauzon	Daniel J. Vella	Frank Stronach	1:11.80
1993	O'Martin	Robert Landry	Michael J. Doyle	Kingsbrook Farm	1:11.40
1992	Rule Sixteen	Robin Platts	David Maclean	Richard L. Duchossois	1:11.00
1991	Buckys Solution	Larry Attard	Tino Attard	Elizabeth A. Farr	1:12.40
1990	Maxwell Street	Dave Penna	Peter Vestal	J. Giglio / M. Ryan	1:11.20
1989	Wavering Girl	Dave Penna	Michael J. Doyle	Windhaven	1:11.20
1988	Charlie Barley	Don Seymour	Grant Pearce	King Caledon Farm	1:11.20
1987	Highland Ruckus	David Clark	Tino Mattine	Linmac Farms	1:10.60
1986	Fozzie Bear	Larry Attard	Tino Attard	V.C.L./Spatafora	1:10.40
1985	Color Me Smart	Jeffrey Fell	James E. Day	Sam-Son Farm	1:10.40
1984	The Royal Freeze	David Clark	Gordon M. Huntley	Victura Farm	1:11.60
1983	New Connection	David Clark	Trevor Swan	J. D. Cameron	1:10.80
1982	Sunny's Halo	Dave Penna	David C. Cross Jr.	David J. Foster	1:10.40
1981	Deputy Minister	Lloyd Duffy	Bill Marko	Centurion/Kinghaven	1:10.60
1980	Mt. Tabor Road	Joey Belowus	Sheldon Wolfe	J. C. Delongis	1:11.00
1979	Corvette Chris	Lloyd Duffy	Gerry Belanger	E. B. Seedhouse	1:17.00
1978	Vent d'Ouest	J. Paul Souter	Yonnie Starr	Jean-Louis Levesque	1:16.60
1977	Poker All Night	Larry Attard	W. Woods	J. M. Martin	1:19.80
1976	Male Strike	Avelino Gomez	Frank Merrill, Jr.	Beverly Bronfman	1:19.60
1975	Ambassador B.	Robin Platts	Gil Rowntree	Stafford Farms	1:18.80
1974	Greek Answer	W. Green	Frank Merrill, Jr.	W. P. Gilbride	1:17.00
1973	Trudie Tudor	Sandy Hawley	John Morahan	Doug Banks	1:20.80
1972	La Prevoyante	John LeBlanc	Yonnie Starr	Jean-Louis Levesque	1:17.80
1971	O. B. Green	Gregg McCarron	Odie Clelland	J. T. Bottomley	1:20.40
1970	Kennedy Road	John LeBlanc	James C. Bentley	Helen G. Stollery	1:18.20
1969	Spirits Up	Robin Platts	P. Peters	W. A. Gordon	1:20.00
1968	Viceregal	Richard Grubb	Gordon J. McCann	Windfields Farm	1:18.40
1967	Son Costume	James Kelly	R. E. Fisher	L. Poloniato & J. Ippolito	1:18.80
1966	Pine Point	Avelino Gomez	Jerry C. Meyer	Willow Downs Farm	1:12.00
1965	Titled Hero	John LeBlanc	Patrick MacMurchy	Peter K. Marshall	1:12.80
1964	Flyalong	Clifford Potts	Duke Campbell	T. Hays / D. Weldon	1:13.80
1963	Pierlou	John Burton	Duke Campbell	Jean-Louis Levesque	1:13.20
1962	Sea Service	Herb Dalton	A. Irwin	D. G. Ross	1:12.00
1961	Sun Dan	Clifford Potts	Willie Thurner	W. J. Farr	1:12.20
1960	Cairnfield	Avelino Gomez	Willie Thurner	W. J. Farr	1:12.40
1959	Credit Curb	R. Wright	John Annesley	G. B. Elliott	1:05.80
1958	Willowdale Boy	Norm Leid	Lou Cavalaris, Jr.	P. Del Greco	1:13.20
1957	Hathaway	Chris Rogers	Morris Fishman	H. Clifford Hatch	1:05.20
1956	Squire John	Alex Wick	Gordon M. Huntley	Kinrara Stable	1:07.60
