= Schuylerville Stakes =

- Class: Listed
- Location: Saratoga Race Course; Saratoga Springs, New York, United States
- Inaugurated: 1918
- Race type: Thoroughbred – Flat racing
- Website: NYRA

Race information
- Distance: 6 furlongs
- Surface: Dirt
- Track: Left-handed
- Qualification: Two-year-old fillies
- Weight: 122 lbs. with 2 lbs. allowance for maidens
- Purse: $200,000 (2026)

The Schuylerville Stakes is an American Thoroughbred horse race held annually at Saratoga Race Course in Saratoga Springs, New York. Open to two-year-old fillies, it is contested at a distance of six furlongs on dirt. A Listed event, it currently offers a purse of $200,000. By tradition, the Schuylerville is the first stakes race run at every Saratoga meet.

The race is named for the town of Schuylerville, New York, which is adjacent to Saratoga Springs. The race was hosted by Belmont Park in 1943, 1944, and 1945 when races were moved from Saratoga due to World War II, and in 1952 at the now defunct Jamaica Race Course. Inaugurated at a distance of five and one half furlongs, it was contested at that distance through 1959 and from 1962 through 1968. It was run in two divisions in 1959, 1965, and 1974.

In 2006, the race was downgraded from a Grade II to a Grade III.

In 2024 the event was downgraded by the Thoroughbred Owners and Breeders Association to Listed status.

== Records ==
Speed record: (At current distance of 6 furlongs)

- 1:09 4/5 – Laughing Bridge (1974)

Margins:

- 10 lengths – Tuscaloosa (1918)

Most wins by a jockey:

- 5 – John Velazquez (2002, 2006, 2011, 2014, 2016)

Most wins by a trainer:

- 6 – D. Wayne Lukas (1986, 1987, 1988, 1995, 1999, 2004)
- 6 – Todd Pletcher (2002, 2003, 2006, 2011, 2014, 2016)

Most wins by an owner:

- 4 – Wheatley Stable (1933, 1959, 1962, 1969)

== Winners of the Schuylerville Stakes since 1947 ==
Year	Winner	Jockey	Trainer	Owner	Time
2026	Harper's Corner	Paco Lopez	Cathal Lynch	Charles L. Biggs	1:09.96
2025	Kingsolver	Flavien Prat	Rodolphe Brisset	Storyteller Racing, Michael Schroeck, Open Gate Horse Ventures, Brian Cahoe, Scott Catlett, Dave Russel, Matthew Ransdell, Michael Motley & Joel Braun	1:13.17
2024	The Queens M G	Dylan Davis	Saffie A. Joesph Jr.	C Two Racing & Mathis Stable	1:11.31
2023	Becky's Joker	Javier Castellano	Gary C. Contessa	Lee Pokoik	1:12.52
2022	Just Cindy	Irad Ortiz Jr.	Eddie Kenneally	Clarkland Farm	1:11.95
2021	Pretty Birdie	Luis Saez	Norm Casse	Marylou Whitney Stables	1:12.32
2020	Dayoutoftheoffice	Junior Alvarado	Timothy E. Hamm	Siena Farms LLC	1:10.43
2019	Comical	Javier Castellano	Doug O'Neill	ERJ Racing LLC, Gary Barber, Dave Kenny, Madaket Stables LLC	1:11.66
2018	Catherinethegreat	José Ortiz	Mark E. Casse	John C. Oxley	1:09.98
2017	Dream It Is	Luis Contreras	Barbara Minshall	Hoolie Racing Stable LLC	1:11.85
2016	Sweet Loretta	John Velazquez	Todd Pletcher	St. Elias Stable	1:10.87
2015	Off the Tracks	Luis Saez	Roderick R. Rodriguez	J. Stables LLC	1:11.27
2014	Fashion Alert	John Velazquez	Todd A. Pletcher	Bolton/Hall	1:11.78
2013	Brazen Persuasion (DH)	Rosie Napravnik	Steve Asmussen	Marilyn & Darren Pollitt	1:12.12
2013	Bahnah (DH)	Corey Lanerie	Bret Calhoun	Wayne Sanders/Larry Hirsch	1:12.12
2012	So Many Ways	Javier Castellano	Anthony W. Dutrow	Maggi Moss	1:11.51
2011	Georgie's Angel	John Velazquez	Todd Pletcher	Sheffer Racing Stable	1:10.68
2010	Le Mi Geaux	Frederic Lenclud	Richard E. Dutrow Jr.	Lansdon B. Robbins, III	1:13.67
2009	Hot Dixie Chick	Robby Albarado	Steve Asmussen	Grace Stables	1:10.18
2008	Jardin	Robby Albarado	Steve Asmussen	Padua Stables	1:12.79
2007	Subtle Aly	Edgar Prado	Richard E. Dutrow Jr.	IEAH Stables	1:11.06
2006	Cotton Blossom	John Velazquez	Todd Pletcher	Dogwood Stable	1:11.63
2005	no race				
2004	Classic Elegance	Pat Day	D. Wayne Lukas	Bob & Beverly Lewis	1:12.40
2003	Ashado	Edgar Prado	Todd Pletcher	Starlight Stables et al.	1:12.12
2002	Freedom's Daughter	John Velazquez	Todd Pletcher	Padua Stables	1:12.14
2001	Touch Love	Jorge Chavez	Anthony Dutrow	Skeedattle Stable	1:11.12
2000	Gold Mover	Craig Perret	Mark Hennig	Edward P. Evans	1:10.33
1999	Magicalmysterycat	Pat Day	D. Wayne Lukas	Padua Stables/J. Iracane	1:10.91
1998	Call Me Up	Jorge Chavez	Alfredo Callejas	Robert Perez	1:12.89
1997	Countess Diana	Shane Sellers	Patrick B. Byrne	Richard Kaster	1:10.39
1996	How About Now	Richard Migliore	Michael Hushion	Barry K. Schwartz	1:12.37
1995	Golden Attraction	Donna Barton	D. Wayne Lukas	William T. Young	1:10.84
1994	Changing Ways	Mike E. Smith	Roger Attfield	December Hill Farm	1:12.66
1993	Strategic Maneuver	José A. Santos	Scotty Schulhofer	Teinowitz /Schulhofer	1:11.15
1992	Distinct Habit	Jerry Bailey	Stanley Hough	Triumviri Stable	1:11.03
1991	Turnback the Alarm	Dennis Carr	William Terrill	Vally View Farm	1:12.04
1990	Meadow Star	Chris Antley	LeRoy Jolley	Carl Icahn	1:11.20
1989	Golden Reef	José A. Santos	Ross Pearce	Buckland Farm	1:10.40
1988	Wonders Delight	José A. Santos	D. Wayne Lukas	Eugene V. Klein	1:09.80
1987	Over All	Ángel Cordero Jr.	D. Wayne Lukas	Eugene V. Klein	1:10.60
1986	Sacahuista	Chris McCarron	D. Wayne Lukas	Beal & French	1:10.60
1985	I'm Splendid	Ángel Cordero Jr.	James J. Toner	Caesar P. Kimmel	1:10.80
1984	Weekend Delight	Charles Woods Jr.	Neil J. Howard	William S. Farish III	1:11.60
1983	Bottle Top	Don Brumfield	Tony Basile	Bwamazon Farm	1:11.40
1982	Weekend Surprise	Jorge Velásquez	Del W. Carroll II	William S. Farish III	1:11.00
1981	Mystical Mood	Jacinto Vásquez	Del W. Carroll	Edward J. Hudson	1:11.80
1980	Sweet Revenge	Jorge Velásquez	Del W. Carroll	William S. Farish III	1:10.40
1979	Damask Fan	Eddie Maple	H. Allen Jerkens	Paul J. Morsches	1:10.20
1978	Palm Hut	Roger I. Velez	James Picou	Joseph M. Roebling	1:10.40
1977	L'Alezane	Ron Turcotte	Yonnie Starr	J. Louis Levesque	1:11.80
1976	Mrs. Warren	Eddie Maple	Woody Stephens	Mrs. Taylor Hardin	1:11.80
1975	Nijana	Jorge Velásquez	MacKenzie Miller	Cragwood Stables	1:12.20
1974	Our Dancing Girl	Vincent Bracciale Jr.	John Rigione	Elcee-H Stable	1:11.20
1974	Laughing Bridge	Braulio Baeza	Al Scotti	Neil Hellman	1:09.80
1973	Talking Picture	Braulio Baeza	John Campo	Elmendorf Farm	1:10.80
1972	La Prevoyante	John LeBlanc	Yonnie Starr	J. Louis Levesque	1:11.40
1971	Numbered Account	Braulio Baeza	Roger Laurin	Ogden Phipps	1:12.60
1970	Patelin	Braulio Baeza	Sylvester Veitch	George D. Widener Jr.	1:10.80
1969	Bright Sun	Eddie Belmonte	Edward A. Neloy	Wheatley Stable	1:05.60
1968	Golden Or	John L. Rotz	Freeman McMillan	Wallace S. Karutz	1:05.60
1967	Idealistic	Robert Ussery	Carl Hanford	Mill River Stable	1:04.60
1966	Vanilla	Larry Loughry	William O. Hicks	Selden Farm	1:05.00
1965	Prides Profile	Donald Pierce	Eugene Edmundson	Clarence W. Smith	1:05.00
1965	Amerala	Walter Blum	Theodore Saladin	Bert W. Martin	1:05.40
1964	Marshua	Bobby Ussery	Norman McLeod	Mrs. Wallace Gilroy	1:04.80
1963	Gallatia	Eric Guerin	Theodore Saladin	Bert W. Martin	1:06.80
1962	Bold Princess	Hedley Woodhouse	Jim Fitzsimmons	Wheatley Stable	1:06.00
1961	Cicada	Larry Adams	Casey Hayes	Meadow Stable	1:11.00
1960	Shuette	Sam Boulmetis	William O. Hicks	Cambridge Stable	1:11.80
1959	Irish Jay	Eddie Arcaro	Jim Fitzsimmons	Wheatley Stable	1:06.00
1959	Make Sail	Manuel Ycaza	Woody Stephens	Cain Hoy Stable	1:06.20
1958	Rich Tradition	William Boland	Casey Hayes	Christopher Chenery	1:07.60
1957	Pocahontas	Eddie Arcaro	George M. Odom	Powhatan Stable	1:07.40
1956	Miss Blue Jay	Eric Guerin	Sol Rutchick	Adele Rutchick	1:06.40
1955	Dark Charger	Anthony DeSpirito	Odie Clelland	Helen W. Kellogg	1:05.60
1954	Two Stars	Willie Lester	Sherrill W. Ward	Howard Adams Flanigan	1:05.80
1953	Evening Out	Ovie Scurlock	Bert Mulholland	Jesse S. Widener	1:05.40
1952	Grecian Queen	Raymond York	James P. Conway	Florence Whitaker	1:07.40
1951	Rose Jet	Eric Guerin	Willie Booth	Maine Chance Farm	1:06.20
1950	Atalanta	Hedley Woodhouse	Preston M. Burch	Brookmeade Stable	1:06.00
1949	Striking	Eddie Arcaro	Jim Fitzsimmons	Ogden Phipps	1:05.40
1948	Gaffery	Arnold Kirkland	Richard E. Handlen	Foxcatcher Farm	1:07.00
1947	Spats	Eric Guerin	Gordon J. McCann	E. P. Taylor	1:04.80

== Earlier winners ==
- 1946 – Bright Song
- 1945 – Red Shoes
- 1944 – Ace Card
- 1943 – Boojiana
- 1942 – Brittany
- 1941 – Romping Home
- 1940 – Nasca
- 1939 – Teacher
- 1938 – Soldierette
- 1937 – Creole Maid
- 1936 – Maecloud
- 1935 – Parade Girl
- 1934 – Uppermost
- 1933 – Slapdash
- 1932 – Volette
- 1931 – Polonaise
- 1930 – Panasette
- 1929 – Flying Gal
- 1928 – Atlantis
- 1927 – Pennant Queen
- 1926 – Aromagne
- 1925 – Taps
- 1924 – Royalite
- 1923 – Befuddle
- 1922 – Edict
- 1921 – Miss Joy
- 1920 – Careful
- 1919 – Homely
- 1918 – Tuscaloosa
