= Ville Saint-Pierre =

Neighbourhood in Lachine, Montreal

Saint-Pierre
- Neighbourhood / Former city
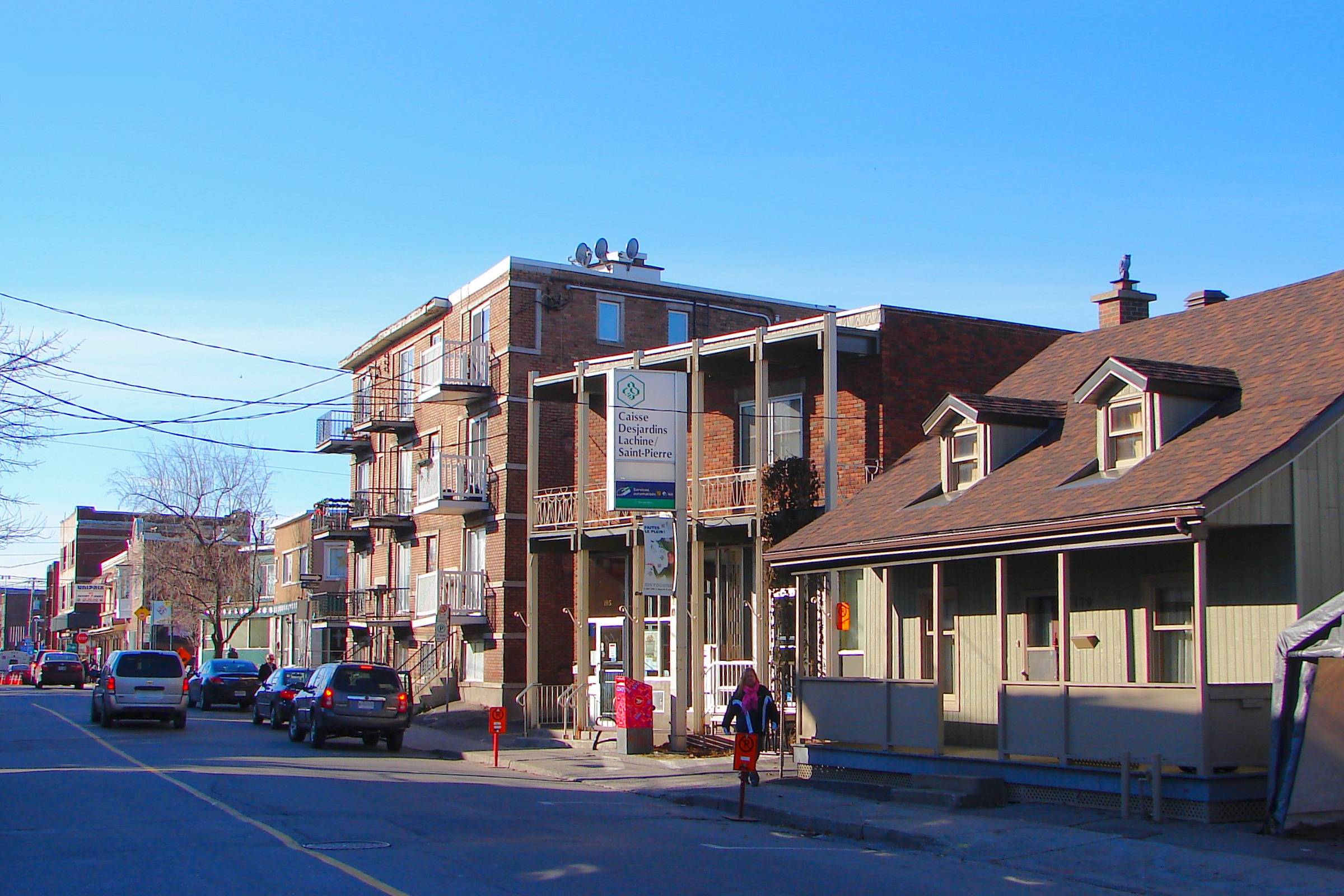
- Rue St-Jacques in St-Pierre

- Location within Montreal
- Coordinates: 45°26′45″N 73°39′00″W
- Country: Canada
- Province: Quebec
- Region: Montreal
- City: Montreal
- Borough: Lachine
- Settled: Early 18th century
- Incorporated: 1894
- Merged: December 1999

Government
  - Federal riding: Dorval—Lachine—LaSalle
  - Prov. riding: Marquette

Area
  - Land: 2.15 km^{2} (0.83 sq mi)

Population (2001)
  - Total: 4,604
  - Density: 2,141.4/km^{2} (5,546/sq mi)
- Time zone: UTC-5 (EST)
  - Summer (DST): UTC-4 (EDT)
- Postal Code: H8R
- Area codes: 514, 438

Ville Saint-Pierre (French pronunciation: [vil sɛ̃ pjɛʁ]) is a small neighbourhood of the city of Montreal, Quebec, Canada, located in the Borough of Lachine. It was a separate town until it merged with Lachine in 1999. In 2002, the amalgamated city of Lachine merged into Montreal.

The borders of the neighbourhood are the Lachine Canal/Borough of LaSalle to the south and east, the Town of Montreal West to the north and the rest of Lachine to the west. The entire neighbourhood has the H8R postal code.

The town had an area of 2.15 square kilometres (0.83 sq mi), and a population of 4,739 in the last census (1996) prior to amalgamation.

== History ==
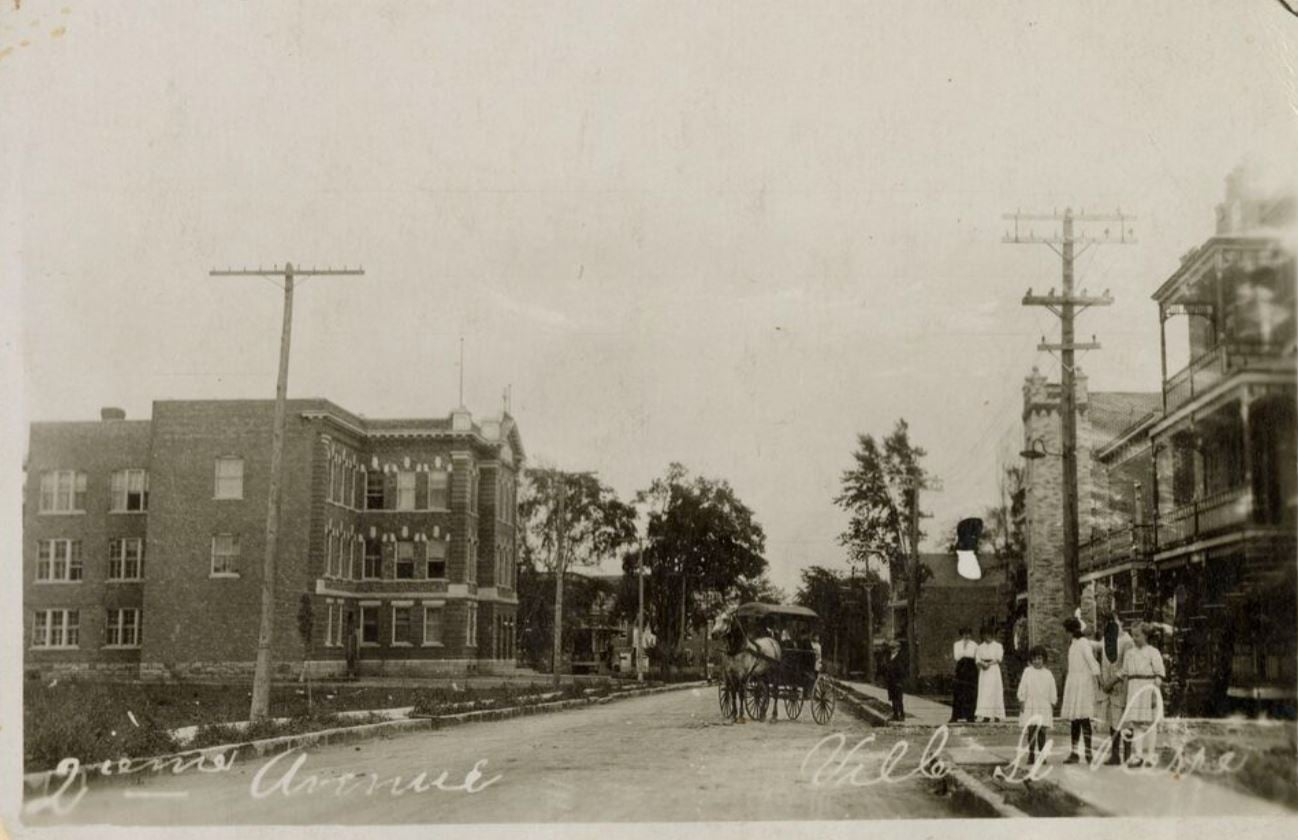
2nd Avenue, Ville Saint-Pierre, 1910s

The area of Saint-Pierre was part of the Montreal Island Seignory that was granted in 1640 to Jérôme le Royer de la Dauversière and Pierre Chevrier, both founding members of Société Notre-Dame de Montréal, a religious organisation responsible for founding the settlement that would later become Montreal. The Little Saint-Pierre River, now channelled underground, used to flow through the place that was known as Coste-Saint-Pierre in 1702, named in honour of Pierre Chevrier (1600-1692), priest and Baron of Fanchamp.

By 1834, the place was known as Coteau-Saint-Pierre. In 1883, it was separated from Notre-Dame-de-Grâce and was called Blue Bonnets Hill, after the Blue Bonnets horse race track that was situated there before relocated to Decarie Boulevard in 1907. In 1894, it was incorporated as the Village Municipality of Saint-Pierre-aux-Liens. It received its first pastor in 1897, but was not made an official parish until 1906.

In 1908, it obtained city (ville) status and its name was shortened to Saint-Pierre. Its location along the Lachine Canal fostered industrial development, in particular manufacturing of wood pipes, aluminum, asphalt, and railway wagons.

== Demographics ==
Historical census populations – Ville Saint-Pierre

Year	Pop.	±%
1921	3,535	—
1931	4,185	+18.4%
1941	4,061	−3.0%
1951	4,976	+22.5%
1956	5,276	+6.0%
1961	6,795	+28.8%
1966	7,066	+4.0%

Year	Pop.	±%
1971	6,801	−3.8%
1976	6,039	−11.2%
1981	5,305	−12.2%
1986	4,944	−6.8%
1991	4,967	+0.5%
1996	4,739	−4.6%

Source: Statistics Canada
