= Ace Marine =

Canadian-bred Thoroughbred racehorse

- Sire: Ace Admiral
- Grandsire: Heliopolis
- Dam: Mazarine
- Damsire: Sweepster
- Sex: Stallion
- Foaled: 1952
- Country: Canada
- Colour: Chestnut
- Breeder: Carr Hatch
- Owner: Larkin Maloney
- Trainer: Yonnie Starr
- Record: 44: 14-5-9
- Earnings: $90,909

Major wins
- Plate Trial Stakes (1955); Queen's Plate (1955); Prince of Wales Stakes (1955); Breeders' Stakes (1955); Seagram Cup Stakes (1955); Durham Cup Handicap (1955); Dominion Day Handicap (1956); Canadian Maturity Handicap (1956)

Awards
- 4th Canadian Triple Crown Champion (1955); Canadian Horse of the Year (1955)

Honours
- Canadian Horse Racing Hall of Fame (2003)
- Last updated on December 17, 2006

Ace Marine (foaled 1952 in Ontario) was a Canadian Thoroughbred Champion racehorse who in 1955 won the three races that four years later were officially designated the Canadian Triple Crown.

== Background ==
Ace Marine was sired by Ace Admiral, a grandson of the six-time British Champion Sire Hyperion, out of the American mare Mazarine.

Purchased as a yearling by prominent owner/breeder Larkin Maloney, Ace Marine was trained by Canadian Hall of Fame trainer Yonnie Starr.

== Racing career ==
At age two, the colt won two races and was a strong third to the then world-record-holding sprinter Boston Doge in the Newport Stakes at Narragansett Park in Pawtucket, Rhode Island.

In 1955, the three-year-old Ace Marine dominated his class in Canadian racing. He won two divisions of the Plate Trial Stakes, then the Queen's Plate, Canada's most prestigious race that for the first time was broadcast on television by the Canadian Broadcasting Corporation. He followed up with wins in other major Canadian races, notably the Prince of Wales Stakes and the Breeders' Stakes. His season saw him set a new Woodbine track record for 1 1/8 miles (1.8 km). Ace Marine's performances earned him Canadian Horse of the Year honors.

Returning to race as a four-year-old in 1956, Ace Marine won the inaugural edition of the Canadian Maturity and the important Dominion Day Handicap.

== Stud record ==
Ace Marine was retired to stud having won fourteen races, but as a sire met with only modest success.

== Honors ==
In 2003, Ace Marine was inducted in the Canadian Horse Racing Hall of Fame.
