= Mighty Heart =

Canadian racehorse

- Sire: Dramedy
- Grandsire: Distorted Humor
- Dam: Emma's Bullseye
- Damsire: City Place
- Sex: Stallion
- Foaled: April 5, 2017
- Country: Canada
- Color: Bay
- Breeder: Larry Cordes
- Owner: Lawrence Cordes
- Trainer: Josie Carroll
- Record: 15: 6-2-2
- Earnings: US$1,059,290

Major wins
- Canadian Triple Crown wins: Queen's Plate (2020); Prince of Wales Stakes (2020) Blame Stakes (2021); Dominion Day Stakes (2021); Autumn Stakes (2021)

Awards
- Canadian Horse of the Year (2020, 2021); Sovereign Award for Champion Three-Year-Old Colt (2020)
- Last updated on November 14, 2021

Mighty Heart (foaled April 5, 2017) is a one-eyed Canadian Thoroughbred racehorse who was named the 2020 Canadian Horse of the Year and Champion three-year-old colt after winning the Queen's Plate and Prince of Wales Stakes, the first two legs of the Canadian Triple Crown. His victory time of 2.01.98 in the Queen's Plate was the second-fastest since 1957, when it moved to its current length at Woodbine Racetrack. As a four-year-old in 2021, he won the Blame, Dominion Day and Autumn Stakes.

== Background ==
Mighty Heart is a bay stallion with a white stripe and three white socks. He was bred by Larry Cordes, for whom he races as a homebred, and was foaled at Curraghmore Farm in Waterdown, Ontario. Cordes also raced Mighty Heart's dam, Emma's Bullseye, who won her only start in 2011. Mighty Heart was her third foal: the other two were also winners. Mighty Heart is from the first crop of foals sired by Dramedy, a well bred son of Distorted Humor whose biggest win came in the Elkhorn Stakes on turf. Dramedy originally stood in Kentucky, then Oklahoma and was exported to Saudi Arabia in 2019.

Mighty Heart's left eye had to be removed after he injured himself while he was turned out with his dam when he was only a few weeks old.

Mighty Heart is trained by Canadian Hall of Famer Josie Carroll.

== Racing career ==
=== 2020: three-year-old season ===
Mighty Heart did not race at age two. He made his first start as a three-year-old on February 21, 2020, in a maiden special weight at Fair Grounds in Louisiana in a race that was originally scheduled for the turf but was switched to dirt. He bumped with another horse at the start then lugged out badly on the first turn. Settling at the back of the pack down the backstretch, he failed to make up ground in the stretch and finished fourth. He was a badly beaten tenth in his next start on March 21 at the Fair Grounds after once again bearing out on the turns.

Mighty Heart was then shipped to Woodbine in Toronto, Ontario, where Carroll is one of the leading trainers. His return to racing was delayed by the closure of the track until June due to the COVID-19 pandemic. The closure also forced the postponement of the Queen's Plate, which would normally have been run in July, until September.

He returned to racing on July 11 in a maiden special weight over 1 1/16 miles on Woodbine's all weather main track. He settled in stalking position just off the pace set by Fort Hope and Artie My Boy, then took the lead in midstretch. He continued to draw away to win by 4 1/4 lengths, earning a Beyer Speed Figure of 82. On August 1, he was entered in an allowance race at Woodbine over a distance of 1 1/8 miles. He sat fairly close to the early leaders and made a wide move on the final turn to hit the lead in mid stretch. However, he could not match the closing kick of Timeskip and finished third, beaten by 1 1/2 lengths.

==== The Queen's Plate ====
On September 12, Mighty Heart faced a sharp increase in class when he was entered in the Queen's Plate, Canada's most famous horse race and the first leg of the Canadian Triple Crown. He was a 13-1 longshot in a field of fourteen that was considered fairly wide open. He was ridden for the first time by Daisuke Fukumoto, who decided to send Mighty Heart to the early lead since nobody else was eager to set the pace. Mighty Heart settled into rhythm and maintained a one length advantage for the first three-quarters of a mile. Clayton closed to within a head on the turn but Mighty Heart responded and pulled away down the stretch to win by 7 1/2 lengths. Belichick, also trained by Carroll, finished second. Mighty Heart's time of 2:01.98 for 1 1/4 miles was the second fastest in the history of the race, behind only Triple Crown champion Izvestia, who finished in 2:01 4/5.

"I was concerned for a minute or two with the quick fractions but he looked like he was settling and doing it easily," Carroll said. "We knew he'd go all day and he sure did. You know what, he's just a very exciting horse who's come a long way for Mr. Cordes, who's had a lot of confidence in him from the start."

==== The Prince of Wales Stakes ====
Mighty Heart's next start was on September 29 in the Prince of Wales Stakes, the second leg of the Canadian Triple Crown, held at Fort Erie Racetrack over a natural dirt surface. He went off as the odds-on favourite in a field of nine. He rated in midpack towards the inside, not far off the pace. Turning into the stretch, Fukumoto angled him to the outside to find racing room. Mighty Heart drew clear to win by 2 1/2 lengths ahead of Clayton.

"This horse is a gift to me, my family and everybody who loves racing," Cordes said. "He was handicapped from day one. His future looked bleak at two weeks old because of the injury [to his eye], but we had faith in him from the day he stepped foot on the track."

==== Later races ====
Mighty Heart started in the Breeders' Stakes on October 24, run over 1 1/2 miles on Woodbine's turf course (officially labeled as good after rains earlier in the week). He was trying to become the 13th Canadian Triple Crown winner and the first since Wando in 2003. However, he was involved in a speed duel with longshot Kunal, completing the first quarter in :23.69 and the half in :47.45. Kunal dropped back after three-quarters of a mile, finishing last, but Told it All then started to challenge. Mighty Heart led until near the head of the stretch but then faded to finish seventh behind his stablemate Belichick. "I thought Mighty Heart ran his little heart out", said Carroll. "Unfortunately he was hooked all the way with that one horse and never got a chance to relax."

Mighty Heart made his final start of 2020 in the Ontario Derby at Woodbine on November 21. He went to the early lead and set moderate opening fractions, but tired in the stretch to finish fourth.

At the Sovereign Awards for 2020, Mighty Heart was named the Canadian Horse of the Year and Champion three-year-old colt. "During this tough time of COVID-19, he's been an inspiration", said Cordes. "If you really look at it, what more could you ask for than to bring people's spirits up? I'm absolutely thrilled about the whole thing."

=== 2021: four-year-old season ===
Mighty Heart began his four-year-old campaign on April 17, 2021, in an allowance race at Keeneland. He went to the early lead, pressed by Royal Mesa while setting moderate fractions. He continued to lead until late in the race but gave away late to finish third.

On May 29, Mighty Heart went off at odds of 10-1 in the Blame Stakes at Churchill Downs. He bumped with Sprawl at the start but regained his stride and tracked the early pace set by American Dubai, led until midstretch. Mighty Heart then dueled to the finish line in a three-way battle with Night Ops and Sprawl, winning by a nose. "He's got a big heart that goes with his name," said jockey James Graham. "He's a very tough individual. Every time he had a horse that came alongside of him in deep stretch he wanted to stick his neck out to make sure he was still in front."

Mighty Heart then returned to Woodbine for the Dominion Day Stakes on July 1, where he was the 9-5 second choice in a field of five. He went to the early lead and ran a slow opening quarter-mile of :25.23, then picked up the pace while completing the half-mile in :48.49. March to the Arch pressed the pace and started to close ground as they rounded the far turn, with the three-quarters completed in 1:11.99. However, Mighty Heart kicked clear in the stretch to win by 1 3/4 lengths. It was Mighty Heart's first graded stakes win: the Canadian Triple crown races are not eligible for grading since they are restricted to Canadian-bred horses.

== Statistics ==
Date	Age	Distance	Race	Grade	Track	Surface	Odds	Field	Finish	Winning Time	Winning (Losing) Margin	Jockey	Ref
Feb 21, 2020	3	1 mile	Maiden Special Weight		Fair Grounds	Dirt	12.20	6	4	1:38.83	(6 3/4 lengths)	Colby Hernandez	
Mar 21, 2020	3	1 mile	Maiden Special Weight		Fair Grounds	Turf	41.00	14	10 (Note: Mighty Heart crossed the finish line in eleventh place but was elevated to tenth after Spanish Kingdom was disqualified)	1:37.43	(17 3/4 lengths)	James Graham	
Jul 11, 2020	3	1 1/16 miles	Maiden Special Weight		Woodbine	All weather	13.80	11	1	1:45.03	4 1/4 lengths	Justin Stein	
Aug 1, 2020	3	1 1/8 miles	Allowance		Woodbine	All weather	3.20	12	3	1:49.97	(1 1/2 lengths)	Justin Stein	
Sep 12, 2020	3	1 1/4 miles	Queen's Plate	n/a (Note: The races in the Canadian Triple Crown are restricted to horses foaled in Canada and thus are not eligible for graded stakes status)	Woodbine Racetrack	All weather	13.25	14	1	2:01.98	7 1/2 lengths	Daisuke Fukumoto	
Sep 29, 2020	3	1 3/16 miles	Prince of Wales Stakes	n/a	Fort Erie Race Track	Dirt	0.85*	9	1	1:55.59	2 1/2 lengths	Daisuke Fukumoto	
Oct 24, 2020	3	1 1/2 miles	Breeders Stakes	n/a	Woodbine Racetrack	Turf	1.15*	11	7	2:32.51	(20 1/4 lengths)	Daisuke Fukumoto	
Nov 21, 2020	3	1 1/8 miles	Ontario Derby	III	Woodbine Racetrack	All weather	1.90*	8	4	1:48.35	(4 lengths)	Rafael Hernandez	
Apr 17, 2021	4	1 1/16 miles	Allowance optional claiming		Keeneland	Dirt	4.70	7	3	1:44.29	(1 1/4 lengths)	James Graham	
May 29, 2021	4	1 1/8 miles	Blame Stakes	Black type	Churchill Downs	Dirt	9.70	6	1	1:50.00	nose	James Graham	
Jul 1, 2021	4	1 1/16 miles	Dominion Day Stakes	III	Woodbine	All weather	1.90	5	1	1:43.33	1 3/4 lengths	Daisuke Fukumoto	

An asterisk after the odds means Mighty Heart was the post-time favourite.

== Pedigree ==
Pedigree of Mighty Heart, bay colt, April 5, 2017
Sire Dramedy	Distorted Humor	Forty Niner	Mr. Prospector
Sire Dramedy	Distorted Humor	Forty Niner	File
Sire Dramedy	Distorted Humor	Danzig's Beauty	Danzig
Sire Dramedy	Distorted Humor	Danzig's Beauty	Sweetest Chant
Sire Dramedy	She's a Winner	A.P. Indy	Seattle Slew
Sire Dramedy	She's a Winner	A.P. Indy	Weekend Surprise
Sire Dramedy	She's a Winner	Get Lucky	Mr. Prospector
Sire Dramedy	She's a Winner	Get Lucky	Dance Number
Dam Emma's Bullseye	City Place	Storm Cat	Storm Bird
Dam Emma's Bullseye	City Place	Storm Cat	Terlingua
Dam Emma's Bullseye	City Place	Glitter Woman	Glitterman
Dam Emma's Bullseye	City Place	Glitter Woman	Carois Folly
Dam Emma's Bullseye	Fleeting April	Northern Afleet	Afleet
Dam Emma's Bullseye	Fleeting April	Northern Afleet	Nuryette
Dam Emma's Bullseye	Fleeting April	April's Luci	Sunny Clime
Dam Emma's Bullseye	Fleeting April	April's Luci	April Moment (family 42)

Mighty Heart is inbred 4S x 4S x 5D to Mr. Prospector, meaning Mr. Prospector appears twice in the fourth generation of the sire's side of the pedigree and once in the fifth generation of the dam's side. He is also inbred 5S x 5S x 5D to Northern Dancer and 5S x 5D to Secretariat.
