= L'Enjoleur =

Canadian-bred Thoroughbred racehorse

- Sire: Buckpasser
- Grandsire: Tom Fool
- Dam: Fanfreluche
- Damsire: Northern Dancer
- Sex: Stallion
- Foaled: 1972
- Country: Canada
- Colour: Bay
- Breeder: Jean-Louis Lévesque
- Owner: Jean-Louis Lévesque
- Trainer: Yonnie Starr
- Record: 30:15-4-2
- Earnings: $546,079

Major wins
- Clarendon Stakes (1974); Laurel Futurity (1974); Cup and Saucer Stakes (1974); Coronation Futurity Stakes (1974); Summer Stakes (1974); Winnipeg Futurity (1974); Manitoba Derby (1975); Quebec Derby (1975); Colonel R. S. McLaughlin Handicap (1975) Canadian Classic Race wins: Queen's Plate (1975); Prince of Wales Stakes (1975)

Awards
- Canadian 2-Yr-Old Champion (1974); Canadian 3-Yr-Old Champion (1975); Canadian Horse of the Year (1974 & 1975)

Honours
- Canadian Horse Racing Hall of Fame (2007)

L'Enjoleur (1972 – January 26, 2000) was a Canadian Thoroughbred race horse. Bred and owned by prominent Montreal businessman Jean-Louis Lévesque, L'Enjoleur was sired by U.S. Racing Hall of Fame inductee, Buckpasser, a son of another Hall of Famer, Tom Fool. He was out of the racing mare Fanfreluche, a daughter of the 20th Century's most influential sire, Northern Dancer.

Trained by Yonnie Starr, in 1974 L'Enjoleur was voted the Sovereign Award as Canadian champion two-year-old plus the most prestigious of all, the Sovereign Award for Horse of the Year. Included in his 1974 wins was the important Grade 1 Laurel Futurity in Baltimore in which he defeated Wajima while equalling the track record time. At age three, L'Enjoleur earned both titles again, becoming the first repeat winner of "Horse of the Year" honours in the award's 25 year history.

L'Enjoleur's 1975 campaign included victory in the first two legs of the Canadian Triple Crown. He captured the Queen's Plate in June then the Prince of Wales Stakes in July before finishing third on the grass in the August Breeders' Stakes. L'Enjoleur was retired to stud at the end of the 1975 season with a race record of 15-4-2 in 30 starts.

As a sire, L'Enjoleur produced two champions, seven group/graded stakes winners, and 32 overall stakes winners. After ill health forced Jean-Louis Lévesque (1911-1994) to sell his stable, in 1993 L'Enjoleur was sent to a breeding farm in Ohio where he led the Ohio general sire list on five occasions including four consecutive years from 1995 through 1998.

Pensioned, L'Enjoleur died at the age of 28 in 2000 at Highland Meadows Farm near Petersburg, Ohio.

In 2007, L'Enjoleur was inducted into the Canadian Horse Racing Hall of Fame.

Racing wins at age 2:

- Laurel Futurity
- Ontario Foaled Stakes
- Coronation Futurity
- Cup and Saucer Stakes
- Summer Stakes
- Winnipeg Futurity
- Clarendon Stakes

Racing wins at age 3:

- Carling O'Keefe Invitational Handicap
- Queen's Plate
- Prince of Wales Stakes
- Manitoba Derby
- Quebec Derby
- Colonel R. S. McLaughlin Handicap
- Harry Jeffrey Handicap

== Pedigree ==
Pedigree of L'Enjoleur
| Sire Buckpasser | Tom Fool | Menow | Pharamond II |
| Sire Buckpasser | Tom Fool | Menow | Alcibiades |
| Sire Buckpasser | Tom Fool | Gaga | Bull Dog |
| Sire Buckpasser | Tom Fool | Gaga | Alpoise |
| Sire Buckpasser | Busanda | War Admiral | Man o' War |
| Sire Buckpasser | Busanda | War Admiral | Brushup |
| Sire Buckpasser | Busanda | Businesslike | Blue Larkspur |
| Sire Buckpasser | Busanda | Businesslike | La Troienne |
| Dam Fanfreluche | Northern Dancer | Nearctic | Nearco |
| Dam Fanfreluche | Northern Dancer | Nearctic | Lady Angela |
| Dam Fanfreluche | Northern Dancer | Natalma | Native Dancer |
| Dam Fanfreluche | Northern Dancer | Natalma | Almahmoud |
| Dam Fanfreluche | Ciboulette | Chop Chop | Flares |
| Dam Fanfreluche | Ciboulette | Chop Chop | Sceptical |
| Dam Fanfreluche | Ciboulette | Windy Answer | Windfields |
| Dam Fanfreluche | Ciboulette | Windy Answer | Reply |
