= Jammed Lovely =

Canadian-bred Thoroughbred racehorse

- Sire: Jamie K.
- Grandsire: Crowfoot
- Dam: Eolia
- Damsire: Brick
- Sex: Filly
- Foaled: 1964
- Country: Canada
- Colour: Bay
- Breeder: Conn Smythe
- Owner: Conn Smythe
- Trainer: Yonnie Starr
- Record: 23: 8-6-4
- Earnings: Can$100,411

Major wins
- Mazarine Stakes (1966); Natalma Stakes (1966) Canadian Classic Race wins: Queen's Plate (1967)

Awards
- Canadian Champion Two-Year-Old Filly (1966)

Honours
- Canadian Horse Racing Hall of Fame (2007); Jammed Lovely Stakes at Woodbine Racetrack

Jammed Lovely (foaled 1964 in Ontario) was a Canadian Champion and Hall of Fame Thoroughbred racehorse who won the 1967 Queen's Plate, Canada's most prestigious race and North America's oldest annually run stakes race.

Bred and raced by Conn Smythe, owner of the NHL hockey team the Toronto Maple Leafs, Jammed Lovely was trained by future Canadian Horse Racing Hall of Fame inductee Yonnie Starr. At age two, she earned Canadian Champion Two-Year-Old Filly honours after winning five races including an eleven-length win in both the Natalma Stakes on turf and the Mazarine Stakes on dirt.

Racing at age three, Jammed Lovely ran second on a sloppy track in the 1967 Canadian Oaks, Canada's most prestigious race for fillies of her age group. She then defeated a field of males in winning the Queen's Plate.

After she retired to broodmare duty, the most successful runners of Jammed Lovely's offspring was the multiple stakes winner Lovely Sunrise.

In 2007, Jammed Lovely was inducted into the Canadian Horse Racing Hall of Fame.
