= La Prevoyante =

Canadian-bred Thoroughbred racehorse

- Sire: Buckpasser
- Grandsire: Tom Fool
- Dam: Arctic Dancer
- Damsire: Nearctic
- Sex: Filly
- Foaled: 1970
- Country: Canada
- Colour: Bay
- Breeder: Jean-Louis Lévesque
- Owner: Jean-Louis Lévesque
- Trainer: Yonnie Starr
- Record: 39: 25-5-3
- Earnings: $572,417

Major wins
- Colin Stakes (1972); Frizette Stakes (1972); Selima Stakes (1972); Matron Stakes (1972); Spinaway Stakes (1972); Schuylerville Stakes (1972); Gardenia Stakes (1972); La Troienne Stakes (1973); Quebec Derby (1973)

Awards
- U.S. Champion 2-Yr-Old Filly (1972); Canadian Horse of the Year (1972); Canadian Champion Older Female Horse (1974)

Honours
- Canadian Horse Racing Hall of Fame (1976); United States Racing Hall of Fame (1995); La Prevoyante Stakes at Woodbine Racetrack; La Prevoyante Stakes at Gulfstream Park

La Prevoyante (1970–1974) was a Canadian-bred thoroughbred race horse elected to the Racing Halls of Fame in the United States and Canada.

== Background ==
La Prevoyante was bred and owned by Jean-Louis Lévesque. Her sire was Buckpasser, a son of Tom Fool.

== Racing career ==
=== 1972: two-year-old season ===
Racing in the United States at age two, La Prevoyante went undefeated, winning all 12 starts under jockey John LeBlanc en route to the 1972 Eclipse Award as American Champion Two-Year-Old Filly and the Sovereign Award as the Canadian Horse of the Year. In a rare occurrence, two two-year-olds topped the balloting for 1972 American Horse of the Year honours with Secretariat edging out La Prevoyante. Secretariat received the votes of the Thoroughbred Racing Associations of North America and the Daily Racing Form, while La Prevoyante was chosen by the National Turf Writers Association.

=== 1973: three-year-old season ===
As a 3-year-old, La Prevoyante did not achieve the same success. She lost for the first time in her initial start, finishing second in a six-furlong race at Gulfstream Park. She took another second in the 1973 Kentucky Oaks and was third in the Canadian Oaks.

Her French Canadian owner brought La Prevoyante to his hometown of Montreal, Quebec where she won the Quebec Derby at Blue Bonnets Raceway. Although the betting favorite, on a muddy track she finished well back in the 1973 Queen's Plate at Woodbine Racetrack in Toronto, Ontario.

=== 1974: four-year-old season ===
In 1974, she won three consecutive sprint races at the Saratoga Race Course. Following the December 28, 1974 Miss Florida Handicap at the Tropical-at-Calder meet, La Prevoyante collapsed in the unsaddling area. She got back on her feet and was able to walk to the stables but collapsed again and died of a ruptured lung.

== Honours ==
La Prevoyante was part of the inaugural class of inductees in the Canadian Horse Racing Hall of Fame. She was inducted into the United States National Museum of Racing and Hall of Fame in 1995.

== Pedigree ==
Pedigree of La Prevoyante
Sire Buckpasser	Tom Fool	Menow	Pharamond II
Sire Buckpasser	Tom Fool	Menow	Alcibiades
Sire Buckpasser	Tom Fool	Gaga	Bull Dog
Sire Buckpasser	Tom Fool	Gaga	Alpoise
Sire Buckpasser	Busanda	War Admiral	Man o' War
Sire Buckpasser	Busanda	War Admiral	Brushup
Sire Buckpasser	Busanda	Businesslike	Blue Larkspur
Sire Buckpasser	Busanda	Businesslike	La Troienne
Dam Arctic Dancer	Nearctic	Nearco	Pharos
Dam Arctic Dancer	Nearctic	Nearco	Nogara
Dam Arctic Dancer	Nearctic	Lady Angela	Hyperion
Dam Arctic Dancer	Nearctic	Lady Angela	Sister Sarah
Dam Arctic Dancer	Natalma	Native Dancer	Polynesian
Dam Arctic Dancer	Natalma	Native Dancer	Geisha
Dam Arctic Dancer	Natalma	Almahmoud	Mahmoud
Dam Arctic Dancer	Natalma	Almahmoud	Arbitrator
