= Buckpasser =

American Thoroughbred racehorse

- Buckpasser's grave at Claiborne Farm
- Sire: Tom Fool
- Grandsire: Menow
- Dam: Busanda
- Damsire: War Admiral
- Sex: Stallion
- Foaled: 1963
- Country: United States
- Colour: Bay
- Breeder: Ogden Phipps
- Owner: Ogden Phipps. Racing colors: Black, cherry cap.
- Trainer: William C. Winfrey; Edward A. Neloy
- Record: 31: 25–4–1
- Earnings: $1,462,014

Major wins
- Champagne Stakes (1965); Hopeful Stakes (1965); National Stallion Stakes (1965); Tremont Stakes (1965); Flamingo Stakes (1966); Jockey Club Gold Cup (1966); Arlington Classic (1966); Woodward Stakes (1966); Lawrence Realization Stakes (1966); Leonard Richards Stakes (1966); Travers Stakes (1966); American Derby (1966); Everglades Stakes (1966); San Fernando Stakes (1967)

Awards
- U.S. Champion Two-Year-Old Male (1965); U.S. Champion Three-Year-Old Male (1966); U.S. Horse of the Year (1966); DRF Champion Handicap Male Horse (1966); TRA Champion Handicap Male Horse (1967); Leading broodmare sire in North America (1983, 1984, 1989)

Honours
- U.S. Racing Hall of Fame (1970) #14 - Top 100 U.S. Racehorses of the 20th Century
- Last updated on 28 September 2010

Buckpasser (February 13, 1963– March 6, 1978) was a champion American Thoroughbred racehorse who was the 1966 Horse of the Year. His other achievements include 1965 Champion Two-Year-Old, 1966 Champion Three-Year-Old, 1966 Champion Handicap Horse, and 1967 Champion Handicap Horse. He was also the leading broodmare sire in 1983, 1984, and 1989.

== Background ==
Buckpasser was a bay colt that was bred and owned by Ogden Phipps and foaled at Claiborne Farm in Paris, Kentucky. He was sired by the Horse of the Year-winner Tom Fool, and his dam was the stakes-winning mare Busanda, by the Triple Crown-winner War Admiral. Busanda's second dam was the "blue hen" broodmare La Troienne (FR). Buckpasser was a half-brother to several other horses that included the stakes-winners Bupers (won $221,688) and Bureaucracy ($156,635). Buckpasser was inbred in the fourth generation (4m x 4f) to the French racehorse and influential sire Teddy.

Racing official Dr. Manuel Gilman said of him, "Generally, every horse has about a hundred faults of conformation. I would defy anybody to pick a flaw in Buckpasser." Renowned horse painter Richard Stone Reeves said, "Buckpasser was the most perfectly proportioned Thoroughbred I have ever seen." Only two horses, Secretariat and Affirmed, have since been "in a class with Buckpasser".

== Racing career ==
Buckpasser had two trainers, both since inducted into the U.S. Racing Hall of Fame. Bill Winfrey began his training, and when he retired, Eddie Neloy took over and prepared Buckpasser for his three-year-old season.

Buckpasser's first race start was on May 13, 1965, in which he ran a poor fourth. It was the only time he did not place. When Buckpasser ran in the Flamingo Stakes, the race was declared a nonwagering event, forever after being called the "Chicken" Flamingo.

After his two-year-old season and spring, he was placed at the top of the Experimental Free Handicap with 126 pounds. Buckpasser developed a quarter crack that kept him out of the 1966 Kentucky Derby, as well as the Preakness and Belmont Stakes. It took almost three months for the crack to heal.

In Chicago's Arlington Classic, Kauai King ran against the strenuous protests of his trainer. He broke down and was retired, while Buckpasser won the race, setting a new world record for a mile with a time of 1:32 3/5. This record stood for two years until Dr. Fager broke it in 1968, running 1:32 1/5. In 1989, Buckpasser's grandson, Hall of Fame Champion Easy Goer, ran a mile in 1:32 2/5.

Buckpasser won 15 consecutive races that included the American Derby (breaking the track record), the Chicago Stakes, the Brooklyn Derby, the Woodward Stakes, the Travers Stakes, the Malibu Stakes, the Brooklyn Handicap, the Lawrence Realization Stakes, and the two-mile-long Jockey Club Gold Cup. With 13 victories as a three-year-old, Buckpasser became the first horse to earn more than $1 million before the age of four. He was named the 1966 American Horse of the Year.

His four-year-old season commenced with a win in the San Fernando Stakes. Another quarter crack developed in Buckpasser's off (right) fore hoof, and he did not race for 4½ months. When he returned, he scored his 15th consecutive victory in the Metropolitan Mile. On June 17, 1967, Buckpasser's winning streak ended with his first and only attempt at racing on grass. He finished third to stablemate Poker in the Bowling Green Handicap at Aqueduct Racetrack. Assagai, the 1966 turf-course champion, finished second. As The Blood-Horse said in its July 24, 1967, issue: "Never had so many people had so many immunization shots in order to stay home and watch the Suburban Handicap on Independence Day." Three reasons were advanced for his defeat: turf, shoes, and weight. Buckpasser also ran that day with his head held in an uncommon way, slightly sideways. No one has ever understood why.

He won 25 of his 31 races, including a 15-race winning streak, earned five Eclipse Awards between 1965 and 1967, and was inducted to the Horse Racing Hall of Fame in 1970.

== Stud record ==
When he retired, Buckpasser was syndicated for $4,800,000: a record $150,000 a share. He stood at stud at the farm where he was born. In 11 years, he sired 313 foals, of which 35 won stakes races. Included in his get were:

- La Prevoyante (Sovereign Award for Horse of the Year in Canada, Eclipse Award Champion two-year-old filly in the United States, Champion Older Female in Canada),
- L'Enjoleur (CAN) (won Manitoba Derby, Quebec Derby, etc.)
- Numbered Account, (Champion two-year-old filly, dam of Private Account, sire of undefeated Personal Ensign)
- Paristo (Illinois Derby)
- Quick As Lightning (1,000 Guineas)
- Relaxing (Champion Older Female, Broodmare of the Year, dam of Belmont Stakes-winner Easy Goer),
- Sex Appeal dam of El Gran Senor and Try My Best
- Silver Buck (Whitney Handicap, Suburban Handicap, sire of Kentucky Derby-winner Silver Charm)
- State Dinner (Century Handicap, etc.)
- Toll Booth (Broodmare of the Year).

Though he had three tail-male Kentucky Derby (G1) winners (Spend a Buck-1985, Lil E. Tee-1992 and Silver Charm-1997), his record as a damsire stands out.

Buckpasser was a leading broodmare sire in 1983, 1984, and 1989. His daughters have produced Champions and Classic Winners: They are led by Hall of Famers Easy Goer and Slew o' Gold, Belmont Stakes winners Coastal and Touch Gold, and With Approval, as well as El Gran Senor among a number of other influential stallions such as Seeking The Gold, Miswaki, and Woodman.

== Honors ==
In The Blood-Horse magazine ranking of the top 100 U.S. thoroughbred champions of the 20th Century, Buckpasser is #14.

Buckpasser died in 1978 at age 15 and is buried at Claiborne Farm.

== Pedigree ==
Pedigree of Buckpasser, bay horse, 1963
Sire Tom Fool B. 1949	Menow; B. 1935	Pharamond (GB); Br. 1925	Phalaris
Sire Tom Fool B. 1949	Menow; B. 1935	Pharamond (GB); Br. 1925	Selene
Sire Tom Fool B. 1949	Menow; B. 1935	Alcibiades; Ch. 1927	Supremus
Sire Tom Fool B. 1949	Menow; B. 1935	Alcibiades; Ch. 1927	Regal Roman (GB)
Sire Tom Fool B. 1949	Gaga; B. 1942	Bull Dog (FR); B. 1927	Teddy
Sire Tom Fool B. 1949	Gaga; B. 1942	Bull Dog (FR); B. 1927	Plucky Liege
Sire Tom Fool B. 1949	Gaga; B. 1942	Alpoise; B. 1937	Equipoise
Sire Tom Fool B. 1949	Gaga; B. 1942	Alpoise; B. 1937	Laughing Queen
Dam Busanda Blk. 1947	War Admiral; Br. 1934	Man o' War; Ch. 1917	Fair Play
Dam Busanda Blk. 1947	War Admiral; Br. 1934	Man o' War; Ch. 1917	Mahubah
Dam Busanda Blk. 1947	War Admiral; Br. 1934	Brushup; B. 1929	Sweep
Dam Busanda Blk. 1947	War Admiral; Br. 1934	Brushup; B. 1929	Annette K
Dam Busanda Blk. 1947	Businesslike; Br. 1939	Blue Larkspur; B. 1926	Black Servant
Dam Busanda Blk. 1947	Businesslike; Br. 1939	Blue Larkspur; B. 1926	Blossom Time
Dam Busanda Blk. 1947	Businesslike; Br. 1939	La Troienne (FR); B. 1926	Teddy
Dam Busanda Blk. 1947	Businesslike; Br. 1939	La Troienne (FR); B. 1926	Helene de Troie (family: 1x)

== See also ==
- List of leading Thoroughbred racehorses
- List of racehorses
