= Conn Smythe =

Canadian sports executive (1895–1980)

- Born: Constantine Falkland Cary Smythe; February 1, 1895; Toronto, Ontario, Canada
- Died: November 18, 1980 (aged 85); Toronto, Ontario, Canada
- Resting place: Park Lawn Cemetery, Toronto
- Education: University of Toronto
- Occupations: Sports team owner Racehorse owner/breeder
- Spouse: Irene Sands
- Children: 4, including Stafford Smythe
- Awards: Military Cross (World War I) Thoroughbred horse racing awards: Canadian Horse Racing Hall of Fame (1977); 2× Sovereign Award for Outstanding Breeder (1977, 1978)
- Honours: NHL honours: Hockey Hall of Fame (1958); Conn Smythe Trophy named in his honour; Smythe Division (1974–1993) named in his honour

Constantine Falkland Cary Smythe MC (/ˈsmaɪθ/; February 1, 1895 – November 18, 1980) was a Canadian businessman, soldier and executive in ice hockey and horse racing. He was best known as the principal owner of the Toronto Maple Leafs of the National Hockey League (NHL) from 1927 to 1961 and as the builder of their longtime home arena, Maple Leaf Gardens.

When the then-Toronto St. Patricks was facing financial trouble and under threat of being moved, Smythe organized a partnership to buy the team and keep it in Toronto. It was at his instigation that the team was renamed the Maple Leafs. He would remain involved with the franchise until the 1960s. The club was very successful during his ownership and his name appears on the Stanley Cup eight times. He was inducted into the Hockey Hall of Fame as a builder. In his honour, the Gardens gave the NHL the Conn Smythe Trophy, given to the most valuable player of the Stanley Cup playoffs.

Outside of hockey, Smythe was also a decorated soldier in World War I. He returned to serve in World War II, organizing his own artillery battery. He was severely injured, injuries he never fully recovered from. While in hospital, he publicly criticized the Canadian war effort and the lack of trained recruits, embarrassing the Canadian prime minister. He continued to be outspoken during his lifetime. He publicly opposed Canada's new flag and resigned from the Maple Leafs Gardens board when the Gardens held a Muhammad Ali boxing match, over Ali's refusal to serve for the U. S. Army in the Vietnam War.

Smythe was a successful horse breeder and racing stable owner. His interest began as a youth, spending time at the track with his father. He bought his first horse in the 1920s and owned horses from then until he sold them to finance his regiment in World War II. He returned to breeding and racing horses in the 1950s and owned a stable and farm until his death. One of the horses he bred was Wonder Where which won Canadian Horse of the Year. In all, Smythe's horses won 145 stakes races.

With his wife Irene Sands, marrying her while still in university. Together, they ran the C. Smythe Ltd sand and gravel business until her death in 1965. They had four children, one of whom, Stafford, continued the Smythe ownership of the club; their other son Hugh was a director of the Gardens and a successful doctor, and, for a time, the Maple Leafs' doctor. Stafford's son Thomas also worked at the Gardens.Smythe was a philanthropist, contributing to several Canadian charities and also helping in fund-raising. His efforts helped build several permanent facilities for disabled children, deaf persons and the blind. He set up The Conn Smythe Foundation private charity, donating most of his estate to the Foundation, including his stable and farm. Hugh and Thomas would manage the Foundation after Conn's death in 1980.

== Early years ==
Smythe was born on February 1, 1895, in Toronto to Albert Smythe, an Irish Protestant from County Antrim who immigrated to Canada in 1889, and Mary Adelaide Constantine, an English woman. Mary and Albert were married in the 1880s while immigrating to Canada, but their marriage was rocky and they did not live together for more than a few months at a time. Conn was the second of the couple's two children; he had a sister, Mary, five years older, who died due to illness in 1903. Smythe remembered his mother Mary, who was known as Polly, as pretty, a drinker, and troublemaker, while Albert was quiet, a vegetarian, and a devoted member of Madame Blavatsky's Theosophical movement.

Smythe's first home was 51 McMillan Street, now known as Mutual Street, not far from the future site of Maple Leaf Gardens. The family was poor and moved several times during Smythe's youth, the size of lodgings depending on Albert Smythe's wages at the time. At one point, Albert and Conn moved to a house in Scarborough while Polly and Mary stayed on North Street (a section of today's Bay Street) downtown. Mary died in 1906, and Smythe attributed his lifelong teetotalism to his mother's drinking. At age eleven, Conn was christened, the occasion marking the first time that he insisted on the name "Conn" instead of his given name, Constantine. Albert and Conn became estranged after Albert began a new relationship with Jane Henderson. The two married in 1913 and had a daughter, Moira.

Smythe attended high school at Upper Canada College, but disliked it and transferred to Jarvis Collegiate Institute after a year and a half. He developed his athleticism there, playing on the hockey, rugby football, and basketball teams, and playing on city championship teams in basketball and hockey in 1912. At the age of 16, Smythe met Irene Sands, his future wife, after a football game against Parkdale Collegiate Institute, which she attended. Albert Smythe wanted his son to attend university, but Conn defied his father, bolting at age 17 to become a homesteader on 150 acres (61 ha) in Clute Township, near Cochrane, Ontario. After one summer building a home on the property only to have it destroyed by a devastating fire, Smythe returned home and enrolled in engineering studies at the University of Toronto in the fall of 1912. There he played hockey as a centre, captaining the Varsity Blues men's ice hockey team to the finals of the 1914 Ontario Hockey Association (OHA) junior championships and to the OHA junior championship the following year. The coach of the losing team in 1915 was Frank J. Selke, who years later would work for Smythe at Maple Leaf Gardens. Smythe also played on the University of Toronto football team.

== First World War ==
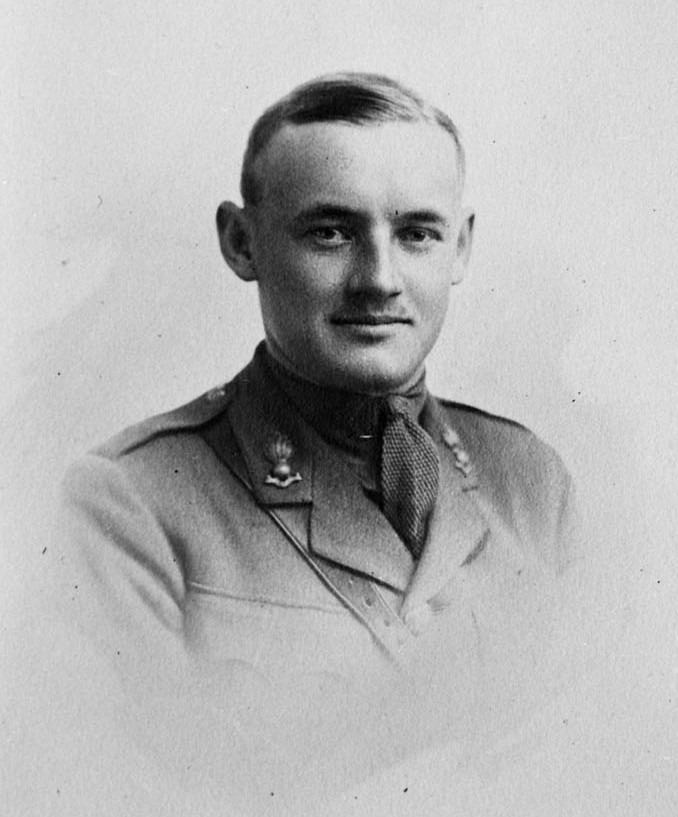
Smythe in service dress shortly after World War I

A week after winning the OHA championship in March 1915, Smythe and his eight teammates enlisted in the armed forces during World War I. He recalled in his memoirs that he and several classmates had tried to enlist at the beginning of the 1914–15 season, but were told to come back when they had beards. After securing a provisional rank of lieutenant with the 2nd (Ottawa) Battery, 8th Brigade, on July 17, he headed to the Royal School of Artillery in Kingston, Ontario, in August for five weeks of training. He made full lieutenant on September 11, and was able to get himself transferred to the 40th (Sportsmen's) Battery of Hamilton, organized by publishing figure Gordon Southam, son of William Southam. The unit, with Smythe as team manager, organized a team to compete in the OHA's senior league; they were one of four Toronto-based teams in the league in 1916. He played one game at centre, and then decided to replace himself with a better player. The team did not complete the season, as the 40th Battery went overseas in February 1916.

The Battery was ordered into the Ypres salient. On October 12, shelling found their position, killing Major Southam and Sergeant-Major Norm Harvie, temporarily making Smythe commander of the Battery. The Battery fought for nearly two months in the trenches near the Somme before being relieved. In February 1917, Smythe earned a Military Cross, when during an attack the Germans counter-attacked with grenades. Smythe ran into the fight and killed three Germans and helped several wounded Canadian soldiers back to safety. On March 5, 1917, Smythe was awarded the Military Cross for "dispersing an enemy party at a critical time. Himself accounted for three of the enemy with his revolver." After an attack where several Canadians were killed because of what Smythe thought was poor planning by the Battery's Major, Smythe wanted out. Smythe transferred to the Royal Flying Corps in July 1917. One of his instructors was Billy Barker, who would later become the first president of the Toronto Maple Leafs. Smythe served as an airborne observer, directing artillery fire. Smythe was shot down by the Germans and captured on October 14, 1917; he was imprisoned by the Germans at Schweidnitz (Swidnica) in Upper Silesia. Smythe made two failed escape attempts and ended up in solitary confinement as a result. He was a POW until the end of the war. Smythe would later make light of his fourteen months in captivity "We played so damned much bridge that I never played the game again."

== Return to Toronto ==
Following the war, Smythe returned to Toronto. With his accrued Army salary and the proceeds from the sale of his homestead plot, he started a sand and gravel business in a partnership with Frank Angotti, who owned a paving business. To support the need for sand and gravel, Smythe bought land northwest of Toronto for a sand pit. He returned to the University of Toronto and finished his civil engineering degree in 1920, marrying Irene during the school year. Smythe and his paving business partner split, and Smythe retained the sand and gravel business. The company was renamed C. Smythe Limited and the company slogan was "C. Smythe for sand," which he had painted on his trucks, the lettering in white on the blue of the trucks. Frank Selke, who had moved to Toronto, was one of Smythe's first employees in the business. Irene took sand and gravel orders over the phone while also caring for the couple's newborn son, Stafford. Smythe owned the business until 1961.

In the evenings, Smythe coached the University of Toronto varsity team, a side job that led to his involvement in the NHL. The Varsity Blues traveled regularly to the Boston area for games against local colleges, with great success. In 1926, Boston Bruins owner Charles Adams recommended Smythe to Col. John S. Hammond, who oversaw the new New York Rangers franchise for its owners, Madison Square Garden. Hammond hired Smythe as general manager and coach, and tasked him with putting together a team. But on October 27, 1926, before the Rangers had played a regular-season game, Hammond fired Smythe in favour of Lester Patrick. Smythe believed Hammond fired him because of his refusal to sign two-time NHL scoring champion Babe Dye, against Hammond's wishes. Smythe thought Dye was not a team player.

Smythe applied to coach the Toronto St. Pats, but was rejected in favour of Mike Rodden. He continued coaching for the University of Toronto and took on a new senior team made up of University of Toronto players, called the Varsity Grads. The team won the Allan Cup and represented Canada at the 1928 Winter Olympics in St. Moritz the following year. Smythe refused to go when two Varsity Blues players he had promised could be part of the team were blocked by what he described as a "pressure play" from two Grads players to get relatives placed on the team instead. One of the players was Joe Sullivan, who years later became a Canadian Senator.

Although Smythe was no longer a Rangers employee, Madison Square Garden president Tex Rickard invited him to the team's opening game at the arena, an invitation Smythe nearly turned down because he felt the Rangers had short-changed him (Hammond paid Smythe $7,500 to settle his contract, but Smythe felt he was owed $10,000). At the insistence of his wife Irene, they traveled to New York and attended the opener in Rickard's private box. When the Rangers won the game, surprising the Montreal Maroons, Rickard offered Smythe a vice-presidency with the club. Smythe turned Rickard down partly because of the disputed $2,500, although Rickard ordered Hammond to pay off the rest. On their return trip to Toronto, the Smythes visited Montreal, where Conn bet the $2,500 on a university football game between Toronto and McGill. He then bet the $5,000 he won on the Rangers to defeat the St. Pats in Toronto, winning again, turning the $2,500 into $10,000 in three days.

== Smythe forms the Maple Leafs ==
J. P. Bickell, a part-owner of the St. Pats, contacted Smythe about coaching the team. However, Smythe told Bickell that he was more interested in buying the team, or at least a stake in the team. Not long after, the St. Pats were put up for sale. Majority owner and general manager Charles Querrie agreed in principle to sell the club for CA$200,000 (equivalent to $3,608,791 in 2025) to a group headed by C. C. Pyle, which would have moved the team to Philadelphia. Bickell contacted Smythe and told him that if Smythe could raise CA$160,000, Bickell would not sell his CA$40,000 share of the team and it would stay in Toronto. After persuading Querrie that civic pride was more important than money, Smythe put together a syndicate that included Bickell and several other investors that bought the St. Pats; Smythe invested CA$10,000 of his own money. Soon after the sale closed on February 14, 1927, the new owners changed the St. Pats' name to the Toronto Maple Leafs.

At first, Smythe's name was kept in the background. However, when the Leafs promoted a public share offering to raise capital, they announced that "one of the most prominent hockey coaches in Toronto" would be taking over management of the club. That prominent coach turned out to be Smythe. He succeeded Querrie as the team's governor, and installed himself as general manager. He installed Alex Romeril as coach. For the next season (1927–28), Smythe changed the team's colours from green and white to their present blue and white. According to the Maple Leafs, the blue represents the Canadian skies, while white represents snow. They were also the same colours as those of his sand and gravel business trucks, as well as that of U of T, his alma mater. Smythe also took over as coach. For the next three years he was a one-man band as governor, general manager and coach.

Smythe developed a public image as a "red-faced, pepper-pot" with nicknames such as "little corporal" or "little dictator." Smythe was not reluctant to chase players and referees on the rink and off. Smythe also developed feuds with opposing coaches and general managers. He used any tactic available to disrupt the opponent. He advertised in a Boston newspaper inviting people to watch "a real hockey team, the Toronto Maple Leafs." After learning that Boston general manager Art Ross suffered from hemorrhoids, he gave Ross a bouquet of flowers with a note in Latin describing where he should shove the flowers.

In 1929, Smythe decided, in the midst of the Great Depression, that the Maple Leafs needed a new arena. The Arena Gardens seated 8,000 people, but the Maple Leafs were regularly playing to standing-room-only crowds of 9,000 customers. Smythe knew it would take over a million dollars to construct the building, and he got backing from the Sun Life insurance company for CA$500,000. He found a site owned by the T. Eaton Co. department store chain on Carlton Street, a site he selected because it was on a streetcar line. Smythe gave up the coaching position to concentrate on the arena project. The building started construction on June 1, 1931, and was ready on November 12, 1931, after five months. As part of a corporate reorganization, Maple Leaf Gardens Ltd. was founded that year as a management company for the team and the arena. The construction workers on the project received 20% of their pay in the form of Maple Leaf Gardens stock. Selke (who had union connections) and Smythe were successful in negotiating this payment method in exchange for using unionized workers.

During the 1931–32 season (the Maple Leafs' first in their new arena), Smythe fired coach Art Duncan after five games and hired Dick Irvin to coach. Irvin promptly led the team to its first Stanley Cup under the Maple Leafs name, and the franchise's third overall. Irvin led the Leafs to six more Finals, losing each time. After the sixth, in 1940, Smythe concluded that Irvin had taken the Leafs as far as he could, and decided to replace him with former Leafs captain Hap Day, who had retired as a player two years earlier. Smythe also knew that he would be away due to World War II and felt that Irvin would not be tough enough without Smythe to back him up. Meanwhile, the Montreal Canadiens had had a dreadful ten-win season, the worst in franchise history, and were looking for a new coach. At Smythe's suggestion, Irvin became the new coach of the Canadiens. Smythe knew he was giving the Leafs' biggest rival a substantial boost. However, the NHL had already seen three teams fold during the Depression. A fourth, the New York Americans, had been wards of the league since 1936, and it was thought to be only a matter of time before they folded as well. He feared the league would not survive if the Canadiens folded. This led him to talk the Canadiens into hiring Irvin.

== Thoroughbred horse racing ==
Smythe first became interested in horse racing as a boy, when he would take stories his father wrote at the track to the newspaper office downtown. Smythe started owning horses in the late 1920s, but he rarely had any success. One early purchase turned out to be one of his most famous. When Mrs. L. A. Livingston sold off her stable, he bought Rare Jewel, a filly, for $250. The filly regularly ran last. The horse was eligible for the Coronation Futurity Stakes, one of the best two-year-old races. Smythe was full of blind hope, and on the trainer's advice, entered her in the race. The day of the race, both the trainer and his partner gave the horse some brandy, unknown to Smythe, who bet over $100 on Rare Jewel. She won the race, a 100–1 longshot paying $214.40 on a $2 bet, besting future Queen's Plate winner Froth Blower. Between the winnings from his bets and his portion of the winner's purse as horse owner, Smythe won more than $10,000 on that one race. Three weeks later, he put his windfall to work for the Maple Leafs by purchasing star defenceman King Clancy from the depression-strapped Ottawa Senators for $35,000. The purchase was only possible because of his gambling winnings, as the other Maple Leafs owners refused to pay the Senators' then-high price, and only agreed when Smythe volunteered to use his own money.

Smythe continued to own horses through the 1930s, but he sold them in 1940, when he made plans to fight in the Second World War. He did not re-enter the racing business until 1954. In 1951, Smythe bought land for a farm in Caledon, Ontario, originally looking for a new location for a gravel pit. At first he kept only cattle, but in 1954 he decided to get back into owning race horses, in partnership with Larkin Maloney, and an area was set aside to keep horses. Smythe learned about the business and went into breeding, buying mares in foal from top thoroughbred lines, and hiring future Hall of Fame trainer Yonnie Starr.

Maloney and Smythe's most famous horse Wonder Where, also led to the breakup of the partnership. Wonder Where, named by Maloney, was bred at Frank Selke's farm in Quebec and bought by Maloney and Smythe in 1957. In 1959, Wonder Where had an outstanding season, including winning the Canadian Oaks. The horse was voted Canadian Horse of the Year for the year and later, the filly was inducted in the Canadian Horse Racing Hall of Fame. The Wonder Where Stakes was established in honour of the horse in 1965, becoming one of the Canadian Triple Tiara races for fillies in Canada in 1995. After the outstanding year in 1959, Maloney wanted to continue racing Wonder Where and Smythe did not, concerned over some tendon trouble. The horse broke down in a race in Fort Erie, and the partnership dissolved after that.

Smythe's horses won 145 stakes races during his lifetime, a record second only to E. P. Taylor in Canada. Smythe's stable won the Queen's Plate twice, the first in 1958 with Caledon Beau and the second in 1967 with Jammed Lovely. In 1973, Smythe became a founding member of the Jockey Club of Canada. In 1977, he was inducted in the Canadian Horse Racing Hall of Fame. After his death, the Smythe stable was sold in 1981 to Gardiner Farms and Harlequin Ranches, for an estimated $2.5 million. Smythe's will gave the racing stable to the Conn Smythe Foundation, which as a charitable foundation, could not run a business. The new owners leased back the farm and stables. The only horse not in the sale was Jammed Lucky, Smythe's favourite, which was given to Smythe's grandson Tommy. The horse had run for Smythe in the 1961 Queen's Plate as one of the favourites and broke a bone in his right foot during the race, but finished the race in eighth place. In 1981, Jammed Lucky was 23 years old and had sired 25 winning foals to that point.

== Second World War and the conscription crisis ==
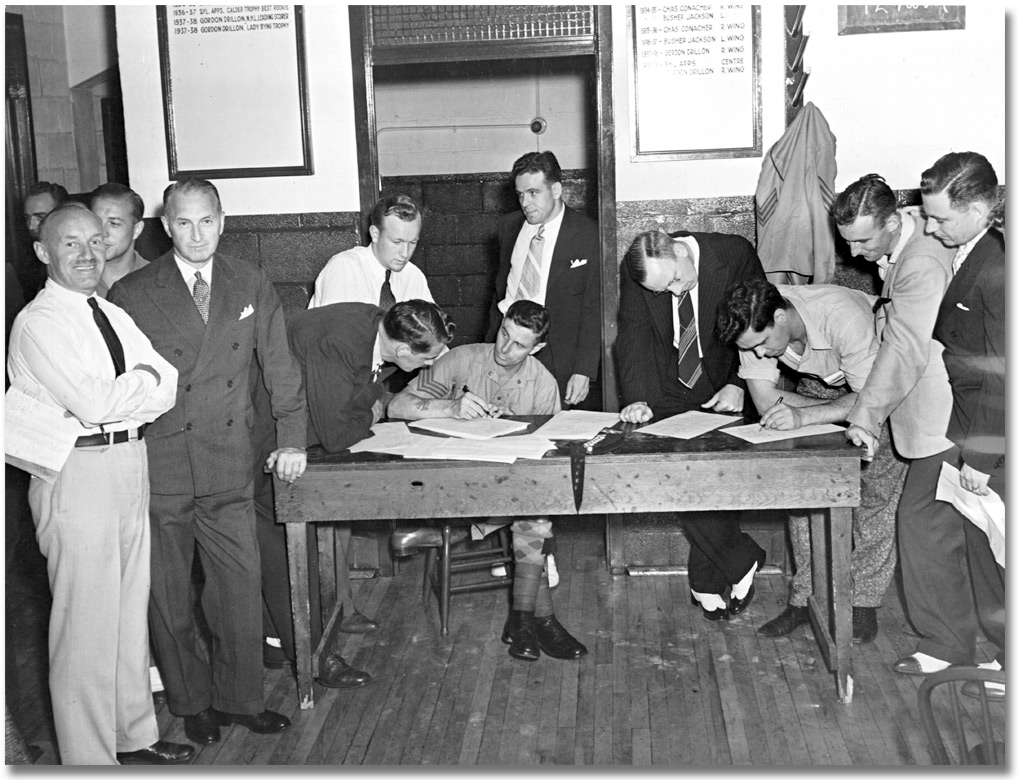
Smythe (far left) enlisting in the Second World War

In the Second World War, at age 45, Smythe again served in the Canadian Army. Initially, he was a captain in charge of a troop within the Canadian Officers Training Corps, based at the University of Toronto. In 1941, along with Colonel Richard Greer, he formed the 30th Battery, a sportsmen's anti-aircraft battery that was part of the 6th LAA Regiment, RCA (Royal Canadian Artillery), Canadian Active Army. Smythe was made acting major and Officer Commanding. He was offered a higher rank to become the army's sports officer, but turned it down. After first serving on Vancouver Island to defend against Japanese attack, the Battery embarked in September 1942 to England. After being stationed in England for nearly two years, Smythe and his unit were sent to France in July 1944, where within three weeks he was badly wounded when the Germans bombed an ammunition depot. His spinal cord injury would mean that for the rest of his life he would walk with a limp and suffer bowel and urinary tract problems. He was sent back to Canada in September on a hospital ship to recover further at Chorley Park Hospital in Toronto.

Smythe, who had seen that the army was using improperly trained troops due to a lack of soldiers, interviewed other soldiers during his time in the hospital, compiling a record over which to confront Mackenzie King. King had developed an official government policy of voluntary service for political reasons and Smythe saw the detrimental effect it had on the Army. Volunteers tried to press home service troops into active service to assist and augment the undermanned troops overseas. From his bed in the Chorley Park Hospital, Smythe dictated a statement to The Globe and Mail newspaper, which printed it on its front page on September 19, 1944:

The need for trained reinforcement in the Canadian Army is urgent.

During my time in France and in the hospitals of France and England, I was able to discuss the reinforcement situation with officers of units representing every section of Canada. I talked to officers from far Eastern Canada, French Canada, Ontario and all the Western Provinces. They agreed that the reinforcements received now are green, inexperienced and poorly trained. Besides this general statement, specific charges are that many have never thrown a grenade.

Practically all have little or no knowledge of the Bren gun and finally, most of them have never seen a Piat anti-tank gun, let alone fired one. These officers are unaniminous in stating that large numbers of unnecessary casualties result from this greenness, both to the rookies and to the other soldiers, who have the added task of trying to look after the newcomers as well as themselves.

I give these true facts of the reinforcement situation in the hope that:

1. Col Ralston, if he has other information, will know that his facts are out of date or that he has been misinformed;
2. The taxpayer will insist that no more money be spent on well-trained soldiers in this country except to send them to the battle fronts;
3. The people who voted these men should be used overseas when needed should insist on the Government carrying out the will of the people; and
4. The relatives of the lads in the fighting zones should ensure no further casualties are caused to their own flesh and blood by the failure to send overseas reinforcements now available in large numbers in Canada.

— Conn Smythe, in The Globe and Mail

Smythe was accused of acting solely for political gain. The publisher of The Globe and Mail at the time was prominent Conservative George McCullagh, and Smythe was friends with Ontario Conservative Premier George Drew. McCullagh and Drew may have used Smythe for their political ends to defeat King. The issue of lack of reinforcements was well known within the Army and Smythe did not make any complaints to senior officers while in active service. Despite being criticized, Smythe kept up his public criticism in the newspapers. After James Ralston, Canada's defence minister, traveled to Italy, he saw for himself the shortage of skilled reinforcements. Ralston, who King did not trust, was replaced with Andrew McNaughton, who was against conscription. However, even King saw the need to send troops for the Canadian Army and he ordered 17,500 reserve troops to Europe in November 1944, which started to arrive in January 1945

== Majority owner of the Maple Leafs ==
While Smythe was away, a committee, headed by Ed Bickle, Bill MacBrien, and Selke ran Maple Leaf Gardens Ltd., with Selke as acting general manager. Upon his return from the military, Smythe found himself in the middle of a power struggle over the presidency of the company. Smythe suspected that MacBrien, a member of the board of directors, wanted to succeed Bickle as president and make Selke general manager in his own right. Smythe wanted to be president and asked Selke for his support. Selke equivocated, and the relationship between the two long-time friends turned acrimonious, leading to Selke's resignation in May 1946. Two months later, Selke became head of hockey operations for the Canadiens and manager of their home arena, the Montreal Forum, succeeding Tommy Gorman.

With the support of J. P. Bickell and the help of a CA$300,000 (equivalent to $4,782,524 in 2025) loan from Toronto stockbroker and Gardens shareholder Percy Gardiner, Smythe bought controlling interest in Maple Leaf Gardens Ltd., and was thus able to install himself as president on November 19, 1947. However, Smythe had been the face of the franchise for more than two decades before then. Acknowledging this, Andy Lytle, sports editor of the Toronto Star, said the appointment "simply makes official what he has been for years in actuality ... Smythe and the Gardens are synonymous terms." MacBrien was made chairman. Smythe repaid his debt to Gardiner by 1960.

Smythe oversaw one of hockey's greatest dynasties when Toronto won six Stanley Cups in ten seasons between 1942 and 1951. Hap Day coached the team to five of those Cups and was assistant general manager for the sixth. He was named in a poll of Canadian sports editors the "most dominating personality in any capacity in sports" for 1949. The Maple Leafs were masters of playoff hockey; their regular-season performances were usually fair to good or just good enough to make the playoffs. Smythe was known for caring little about gaudy regular-season records. However, he did care about winning the Cup, because "winning sells tickets."

In 1950, due to his health, Smythe had to reduce his involvement with the team. He promoted Day to assistant general manager under Smythe, Day handling most duties, although Smythe was involved on occasion. Former player Joe Primeau took over from Day as head coach. The club would win the Cup again in 1951. However, Montreal and Detroit were becoming the pre-eminent teams and the Leafs spent most of the 1950s struggling under three different coaches. Smythe gave up the manager role to Day on February 1, 1955, having felt his hockey "powers" were diminishing. However, just after the Leafs were eliminated from the playoffs in 1957, Smythe told the media that it had been "a season of failure" and that he did not know if the 55-year-old Day would be available for the next season. Day felt Smythe had cut his legs out from under him and resigned. Smythe initially promoted coach Howie Meeker to be the manager, but fired him before the season started. Smythe would manage the team for one more season.

Citing his increased interest in horse racing and philanthropy, Smythe turned team operations over to a seven-person committee, headed by his son Stafford. Newspaper owner John W. H. Bassett was another member of the committee, as was Percy Gardiner's son, George. The committee became known as the "Silver Seven" because the seven had been "born with a silver spoon in their mouths." Initially, all members were in their 30s or early 40s, but that changed before the end of the year when 54-year-old Harold Ballard, president of the Toronto Marlboros, was appointed to the committee to fill a vacancy. In 1958, the committee hired Punch Imlach as general manager; Imlach would later take over the coaching job as well.

Smythe remained involved in league affairs. The Chicago and New York franchises were in poor shape, icing poor teams to poor attendance. The NHL stepped in and guaranteed the teams US$400,000 (equivalent to $4,849,624 in 2025) annually in revenue-sharing to stabilize the teams. Smythe justified this as important to the league's overall survival.

Smythe was an NHL owner during the era before the advent of a players' union. Between the 1942–43 and 1966–67 seasons, the NHL consisted of only six teams (the Original Six), and players who failed to comply with team orders could easily be demoted to the minor leagues and replaced. Players who did not follow Smythe's rules were traded or sent to the minors. Two players, Danny Lewicki and John McCormack, were both demoted to the minors for getting married without Smythe's permission. According to Smythe, the players' lives were in turmoil and couldn't keep their minds on hockey.

The rules are simple. Aside from what you wear, what you say, what you eat, what you drink, who you're with, where you're going, how much you weigh and what you think, the club has little, if any, interest in the hired help, outside working hours. There's one thing about it: the pay is good and it's always on time. There's more civil liberty in digging a ditch. But most of these guys are in a rut. They still seem to prefer hockey.

— Milt Dunnell

While the pay for an NHL player was relatively good, it still left many players looking for other jobs during the off-season, while the owners were all wealthy men. These conditions led to two efforts to organize a union, which Smythe was vehemently against. From 1957 onwards, Smythe, along with other owners, including James D. Norris of the Chicago Black Hawks and his half-brother Bruce Norris of the Detroit Red Wings, were accused of union busting activities related to Ted Lindsay's attempt to form an NHL Players Association. Smythe's role in those affairs are dramatized in the movie Net Worth. Jimmy Thomson, who was acting captain of the Maple Leafs when the players started to organize, was singled out by Smythe. Smythe detailed all the monies Thomson had been paid by the organization going back to junior, while arranging for Thomson to be left off the team. He also allegedly called Thomson a traitor and publicly blamed him for the team's poor season. Thomson finally announced to the press that he would never play again for the Maple Leafs, and he and Tod Sloan were traded away to Chicago. The NHL owners eventually agreed to make some concessions to the players, such as contributing to the players' pensions.

== Post-Maple Leafs years ==
Though the Silver Seven made most decisions involving the Leafs, Smythe was not a hands-off owner and was constantly fighting with his son. Stafford commented: "My father has always given me lots of rope. When I was thirty, I was ten years ahead of everybody. But at forty, I'm ten years behind everybody." Finally, in 1961, Stafford resigned from the committee and this spurred Conn. After four years of fighting, he offered to sell his shares to Stafford and in November 1961, Smythe sold 45,000 of his 50,000 shares in Maple Leaf Gardens Ltd. to a partnership of his son, Ballard, and Bassett for $2.3 million—a handsome return on his investment of 34 years earlier. Years later, Smythe claimed that he thought the sale was only to Stafford, and was furious to learn that he'd brought on Ballard and Bassett as partners. According to this account, Smythe had hoped that Stafford would eventually keep the Gardens for his son Tommy.

As part of the arrangement, Smythe resigned as president and managing director, nominating Stafford to succeed him. At Stafford's instigation, the board then granted Smythe a $15,000 annual allowance, an office at the Gardens, and a car and driver for the rest of his life. Stafford, Ballard, and Bassett then nominated Smythe as chairman of the board. Smythe stood down as governor of the Leafs on February 5, 1962–a position he had held since 1927.

In 1964, Smythe opposed the plan of Liberal Prime Minister Lester B. Pearson to replace the traditional Canadian flag with a completely new design. He wrote to Pearson, whom he had known since the 1920s: "In the Olympic Games, the whole world is represented and when Canada sometimes wins a Gold Medal everybody knows, when the Red Ensign is raised to the masthead, that Canada has won." Smythe disagreed that a new flag would help to unify the country, and switched his support to John Diefenbaker and the Progressive Conservatives. Smythe wrote over 300 letters to Members of Parliament. In 1965, he unsuccessfully lobbied for the Red Ensign to be flown at the Gardens instead of the new Flag of Canada. Ballard ordered the new flag flown because calls were more than three to one in favour of the new flag.

In March 1966, Smythe sold his remaining shares in Maple Leaf Gardens Ltd. and resigned from the board of directors after a Muhammad Ali boxing match was scheduled for the Gardens. He found Ali's refusal to serve in the U.S. Army during the Vietnam War to be offensive because, as he put it in his autobiography, "The Gardens was founded by men – sportsmen – who fought for their country. It is no place for those want to evade conscription in their own country. The Gardens was built for many things, but not for picking up things that no one else wants." He also said that by accepting the fight, Gardens owners had "put cash ahead of class."

Smythe stayed away from the Gardens and took shots at the ownership in the press, stating that he had been "traded for $35,000 and a black Muslim minister." The seats at the Gardens had been replaced with new, narrower ones, and Smythe commented that "only a slim, young man could sit in them but the prices are so high that only a fat rich man could afford them." He continued to be sought out for his views on hockey. When the NHL expanded to 12 teams from six in 1967, Smythe openly opposed the expansion on the basis that it would make for inferior hockey: "We had the best players in the world split between six teams, and hockey was always worth the money."

By this time, Conn and Stafford were not on speaking terms, and it fell to Tom Smythe, Stafford's son, to mediate between the two. Stafford built a new office suite at the Gardens for Conn, and the feud was over. After Stafford was charged with fraud in 1971 and became ill with a stomach ulcer, Conn was with him in hospital when he died. According to Conn, Stafford's last words to him were "see dad, I told you they wouldn't put me in jail."

== Other accomplishments and honours ==
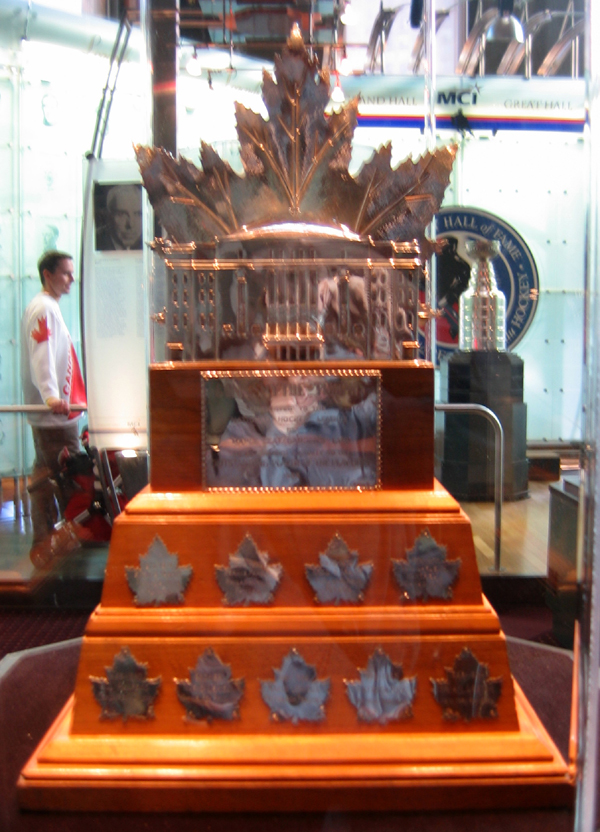
Conn Smythe Trophy in the shape of Maple Leaf Gardens

Being aware of the injuries suffered by veterans, Smythe helped establish and was a founding director of the Canadian Paraplegic Association in 1945 (the predecessor of Spinal Cord Injury Ontario and other spinal cord injury organizations). The Association had its offices and stored its incoming batches of wheelchairs at Maple Leaf Gardens. Charity hockey games to benefit the Association were held at the Gardens.

He became heavily involved in the Ontario Society for Crippled Children (now the Easter Seals). Smythe joined the organization in 1945 when it was $10,000 in debt. He paid off the debt and helped launch the first Easter Seals campaign, which raised $150,000. In later years, Smythe helped organize the financing and construction of their Variety Club Village complex in Toronto.

In 1960, after paying off his debt to Percy Gardiner, Smythe set up The Conn Smythe Foundation, a registered charity which provides grants to charities in need in the Toronto area. Smythe's direction to the Foundation was to not give money to charities that paid expenses to volunteers out of donations. The foundation was operated by Conn, his children and Hap Day. Day continued to help with the Foundation until his death in 1990. Before he died, Conn arranged for his son Hugh and grandson Thomas Smythe to continue the Foundation after his death. Upon his death, Smythe's estate contributed to the Foundation.

Smythe supervised the construction of the Hockey Hall of Fame building in Toronto in 1961. He served as the Hall's chairman for several years, but resigned in June 1971 when Busher Jackson was posthumously elected into the Hall. Smythe said that it made him sick to think of Jackson alongside such Leafs as "Apps, Primeau, Conacher, Clancy and Kennedy. If the standards are going to be lowered I'll get out as chairman of the board." Jackson was notorious for his off-ice lifestyle of drinking and broken marriages. Frank Selke, head of the selection committee, defended the selection on the belief that a man should not be shut out "because of the amount of beer he drank."

Maple Leaf Gardens honoured Smythe's contribution to the game by donating the Conn Smythe Trophy to the NHL in 1964. It is presented to the Most Valuable Player in the Stanley Cup playoffs. The league also named one of its four divisions, the Smythe Division, after him prior to the 1974–75 season. The division existed until league expansion and realignment after the 1992–93 season.

In 1975, at the age of 80, Smythe organized the financing and building of the Ontario Community Centre for the Deaf (now The Bob Rumball Canadian Centre of Excellence for the Deaf), which opened in 1979 on Bayview Avenue in Toronto. One of his final philanthropic efforts was to help in the fund-raising efforts to build the Canadian National Institute for the Blind's new facility, also on Bayview Avenue in Toronto. After his death, his body was at rest at the centre until his funeral.

In 1980, Smythe was nominated for the Order of Canada. Smythe himself felt that "someone with a long memory or even a short one" would vote against his membership. The Order is only given to living persons and Smythe died that year, making him ineligible in any case.

Smythe Park and Recreation Centre in Toronto is located on the site of his old gravel pit. The surrounding neighbourhood is named Rockcliffe-Smythe, partly a sub-division Smythe built for war veterans. Smythe made provisions for a portion of the lands of the sub-division to be reserved for the centre. A street north of Eglinton Avenue, west of Markham Road, is named Conn Smythe Drive in his honour.

His autobiography, Conn Smythe: If You Can't Beat 'Em in the Alley, written with Scott Young, was published posthumously in 1981. The title was taken from Smythe's credo, "If you can't beat 'em in the alley, you can't beat 'em on the ice." In Smythe's memoir he describes it as the most misunderstood remark he ever made. Rather than meaning that his players should go out and bully the opposition, he meant the opposite; that his players should refuse to be bullied by the opposition.

Conn Smythe was inducted into the Ontario Sports Hall of Fame in 1998.

== Family and personal life ==
Smythe married Irene Sands on March 17, 1920, at Central Methodist Church. The couple lived in an apartment on St. Clair Avenue, then moved to the Runnymede area of Toronto to be close to Smythe's sand and gravel business, which operated a gravel pit north-west of Jane Street and St. Clair. In 1927, after their first two children, Stafford and Miriam, were born, they moved to the Baby Point enclave of Toronto.

Irene and Conn had two other children, Hugh and Patricia. Hugh became a doctor and served as the Maple Leaf's team doctor from 1949 to 1969. He later became a specialist in rheumatology, a director of Maple Leaf Gardens, and chairman of The Conn Smythe Foundation. Hugh died in 2012. Patricia died due to an allergic attack at the age of ten, in 1945.

Stafford started in business by joining his father's sand and gravel business as a teen. He worked at the Gardens, eventually becoming a part-owner before dying of complications from a bleeding ulcer in 1971. Stafford's son Tommy joined the Gardens as a youth, apprenticing as a stickboy. He eventually became president of Doug Laurie Sporting Goods at Maple Leaf Gardens. Miriam married Jack Hoult, who also worked at the Gardens. Among Hoult's duties, Hoult reminded season ticket holders who had not dressed up to Conn's standards at games.

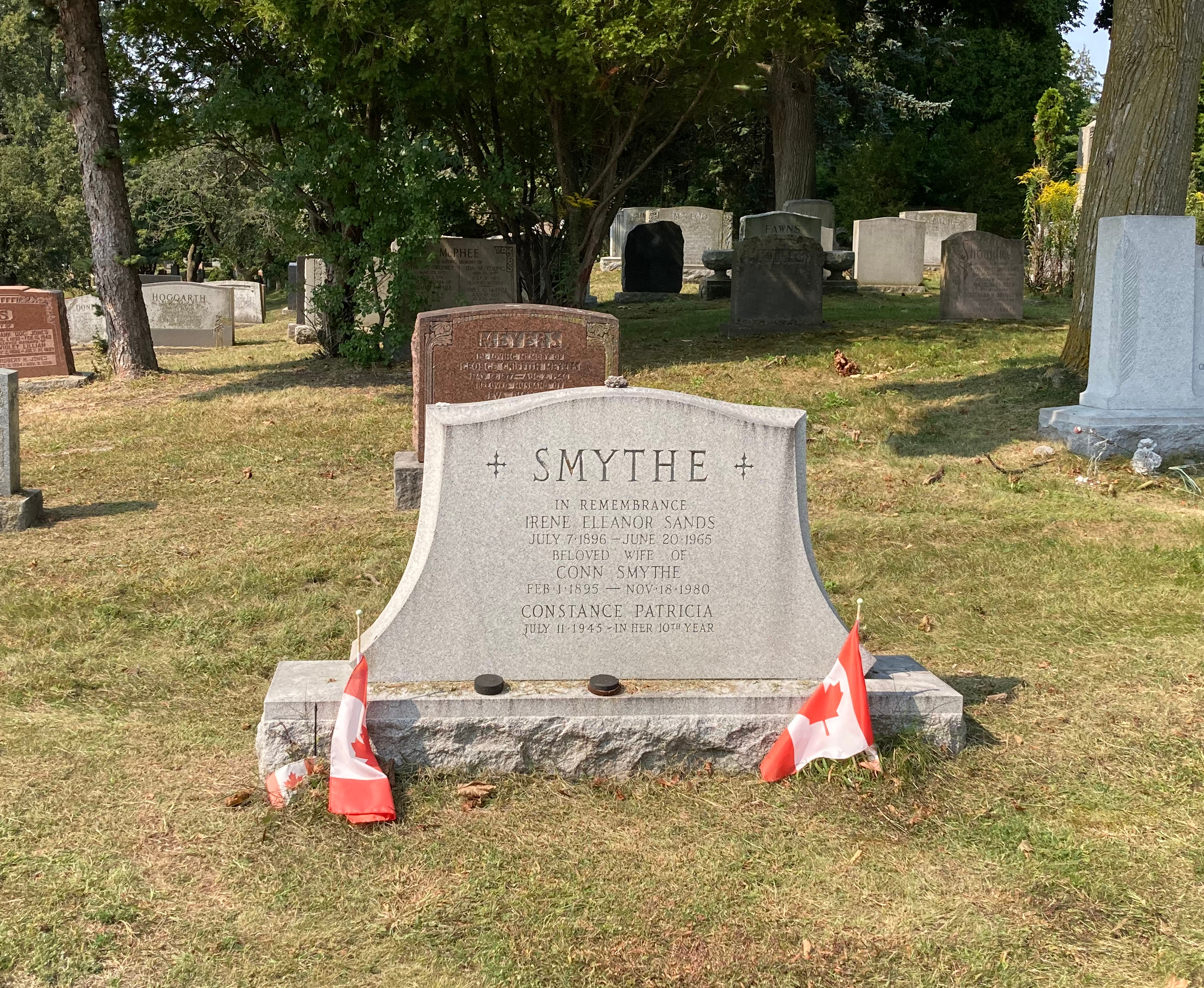
Smythe's grave at Park Lawn Cemetery

Smythe's father died in 1947 at 86 years of age. Smythe had had a rapprochement with his father, seeing him at Christmas and at times when Albert came to Toronto to preach. After his father's death, Smythe joined the Theosophical Society and remained a member for life. In 1977, Smythe explained why he was a theosophist: "It's because a theosophist teaches you that ya can't get away with anything in this life anyway."

Irene Smythe was diagnosed with cancer after Christmas 1963. The illness progressed and Irene died on June 20, 1965. Due to the amount of pain Irene endured, Conn and Irene considered using a revolver to end her life, but near the end she told Conn that it was a "coward's way out" and she endured. After the amount of pain Irene endured, Smythe called her death a "blessed release." Smythe set up a foundation at the University of Toronto in her name, which opened the Irene Eleanor Smythe Pain Clinic at Toronto General Hospital.

On April 20, 1978, Smythe suffered a heart attack. He spent a month in the hospital, and got out in time to spend May 18 at Woodbine, where he had four horses racing that day. His health continued to deteriorate and Conn realized that he was dying. He wrote his last will on September 11, 1980. Smythe died at the age of 85 on November 18, 1980, at his home on Baby Point.

Smythe gave away much of his estate to charity. He arranged for The Conn Smythe Foundation, under Tommy Smythe's direction, to own and run the stable for at least six months, and he made gifts of money, annuities, and his trophies to relatives, friends and employees. Hap Day was given Smythe's share of the sand and gravel business. As the Foundation was a charitable institution, it could not own a business, so the stable had to be liquidated within six months. Except for Jammed Lucky, the rest of the 58-horse stable was sold for CA$2.3 million in March 1981 to Gardiner Farms.

== Coaching record ==
Team	Year	Regular season							Postseason
Team	Year	G	W	L	T	OTL	Pts	Finish	Result
TOR	1927–28	44	18	18	8	-	44	4th in Canadian	Did not qualify
TOR	1928–29	44	21	18	5	-	47	3rd in Canadian	Won in quarter-finals (7-2 vs. DET); Lost in semi-finals (0-2 vs. NYR)
TOR	1929–30	44	17	21	6	-	40	4th in Canadian	Did not qualify
TOR	1930–31	2	1	0	1	-	3	2nd in Canadian	(resigned)
TOR	1931–32	1	1	0	0	-		(interim)	
Total		135	58	57	20	-	136		2-2 (0.500)

Source: "Conn Smythe". Hockey-Reference.com. Sports Reference, LLC.

== See also ==
- List of family relations in the NHL

== Bibliography ==
- Batten, Jack (1969). The inside story of Conn Smythe's hockey dynasty; a fascinating history of the Toronto Maple Leaf Hockey Club. Toronto: Pagurian Press. OCLC 607171263.
- Frayne, Trent (1974). The Mad Men of Hockey. New York, New York: Dodd, Mead and Company. ISBN 0-396-07060-4.
- Hunter, Douglas (1996). War Games: Conn Smythe and Hockey's Fighting Men. Toronto: Penguin Books Canada. ISBN 0-14-025685-7.
- Hunter, Douglas (1997). Champions: The Illustrated History of Hockey's Greatest Dynasties. Chicago, Illinois: Triumph Books. ISBN 1-57243-213-6.
- Jenish, D'Arcy (2013). The NHL: 100 Years of On-Ice Action and Boardroom Battles. Toronto: Doubleday Canada. ISBN 978-0-385-67147-7.
- MacLeod, Alan Livingstone (2018), From Rinks to Regiments: Hockey Hall-of-Famers and the Great War, Victoria, British Columbia: Heritage House, ISBN 978-1-77203-268-0
- McParland, Kelly (2011). The lives of Conn Smythe: from the battlefield to Maple Leaf Gardens. McClelland & Stewart Ltd. ISBN 978-0-7710-5683-3.
- Smythe, Thomas Stafford & Shea, Kevin (2000). Centre Ice: The Smythe Family, the Gardens, and the Toronto Maple Leafs Hockey Club. Bolton, Ontario, Canada: Fenn Publishing Co. ISBN 1-55168-250-8.
- Smythe, Conn & Young, Scott (1981). Conn Smythe: If you can't beat 'em in the alley. Toronto, Ontario: McClelland and Stewart. ISBN 0-7710-9078-1.

Preceded by Position created	General Manager of the New York Rangers; 1926	Succeeded by Lester Patrick
Preceded by Charles Querrie	Principal owner, Toronto Maple Leafs; 1927–1961	Succeeded by Stafford Smythe, Harold Ballard, and John W. H. Bassett
Preceded by Alex Romeril	Head coach of the Toronto Maple Leafs; 1927–30	Succeeded by Art Duncan
Preceded by Charles Querrie	General Manager of the Toronto Maple Leafs; 1927–1957 (shared with Hap Day during 1955–1957)	Succeeded by Stafford Smythe (de facto)
Preceded by Position created	Chairman of the NHL Board of Governors; 1953–1957	Succeeded by James D. Norris
