= Fanfreluche (horse) =

Canadian-bred Thoroughbred racehorse

- Sire: Northern Dancer
- Grandsire: Nearctic
- Dam: Ciboulette
- Damsire: Chop Chop
- Sex: Filly
- Foaled: 1967
- Country: Canada
- Colour: Dark Bay/Brown
- Breeder: J. Louis Lévesque
- Owner: J. Louis Lévesque
- Trainer: Yonnie Starr
- Record: 21-11-6-2
- Earnings: $238,688

Major wins
- Princess Elizabeth Stakes (1969); Natalma Stakes (1969); Manitoba Derby (1970); Alabama Stakes (1970); Benson & Hedges Invitational Handicap (1970); Quebec Derby (1970)

Awards
- TRA United States Champion 3-Year-Old Filly (1970); Canadian Horse of the Year (1970); Sovereign Award for Outstanding Broodmare (1978)

Honours
- Canadian Horse Racing Hall of Fame (1981); Fanfreluche Stakes at Woodbine Racetrack
- Last updated on February 9, 2010

Fanfreluche (April 9, 1967 – July 29, 1999) was a Canadian-bred Champion Thoroughbred racehorse.

== Background ==
Fanfreluche was a bay mare bred in Canada. She was named by her French-Canadian owner Jean-Louis Levesque for the title character of a popular children's television show on the French-language division of the Canadian Broadcasting Corporation.

== Racing career ==
Successfully raced in Canada as a two-year-old, at age three Fanfreluche's performances in both Canada and the United States earned her the Sovereign Award for Canadian Horse of the Year. Fanfreluche was voted American Champion Three-Year-Old Filly in 1970 by the Thoroughbred Racing Association. Office Queen won the rival Daily Racing Form poll in the last year that champions were voted on separately.

In 1981 Fanfreluche was inducted into the Canadian Horse Racing Hall of Fame.

== Breeding record ==
At the end of her three-year-old racing season, Fanfreluche was sold as a broodmare prospect to prominent American horseman Bertram R. Firestone for a then world-record price of $1.3 million. Bred to notable stallion Buckpasser, in 1972 she produced the two-time Canadian Horse of the Year and Hall of Fame inductee L'Enjoleur. She also produced two other champions, La Voyageuse and Medaille d'Or. She has numerous stakes-winning descendants worldwide, including Encosta de Lago and Holy Roman Emperor.

== Kidnapping ==
On June 25, 1977, while in foal to Secretariat, Fanfreluche was abducted from Claiborne Farm near Paris, Kentucky. In December, five months after her disappearance, the FBI located her 158 miles south near the small town of Tompkinsville, not far from the Tennessee border. Fanfreluche was being kept by a family who said they had found her wandering along the country road. Returned safely to Claiborne Farm, in the spring of 1978 Fanfreluche gave birth to her foal, a colt given the French language name "Sain Et Sauf", which in English translates as Safe And Sound.

A few years later, on February 8, 1983, the Irish racehorse Shergar was also the victim of a kidnapping but unlike Fanfreluche, Shergar was never found.

Fanfreluche died on July 29, 1999, of old age and was buried at Big Sink Farm in Midway, Kentucky.

== Pedigree ==
Pedigree of Fanfreluche, bay mare, 1967
Sire Northern Dancer	Nearctic	Nearco	Pharos
Sire Northern Dancer	Nearctic	Nearco	Nogara
Sire Northern Dancer	Nearctic	Lady Angela	Hyperion
Sire Northern Dancer	Nearctic	Lady Angela	Sister Sarah
Sire Northern Dancer	Natalma	Native Dancer	Polynesian
Sire Northern Dancer	Natalma	Native Dancer	Geisha
Sire Northern Dancer	Natalma	Almahmoud	Mahmoud
Sire Northern Dancer	Natalma	Almahmoud	Arbitrator
Dam Ciboulette	Chop Chop	Flares	Gallant Fox
Dam Ciboulette	Chop Chop	Flares	Flambino
Dam Ciboulette	Chop Chop	Sceptical	Buchan
Dam Ciboulette	Chop Chop	Sceptical	Clodagh
Dam Ciboulette	Windy Answer	Windfields	Bunty Lawless
Dam Ciboulette	Windy Answer	Windfields	Nandi
Dam Ciboulette	Windy Answer	Reply	Teddy Wrack
Dam Ciboulette	Windy Answer	Reply	Alaris (family: 4-g)
