= Wonder Where =

Canadian-bred Thoroughbred racehorse

- Sire: Occupy
- Grandsire: Bull Dog
- Dam: On the Fly
- Damsire: New World
- Sex: Filly
- Foaled: 1956
- Country: Canada
- Colour: Bay
- Breeder: Rolling Range Farm
- Owner: Larkin Maloney & Conn Smythe
- Trainer: Yonnie Starr
- Record: 33: 19-9-3
- Earnings: $109,985

Major wins
- My Dear Stakes (1958); Clarendon Stakes (1958); Belle Mahone Stakes (1959); Maple Leaf Stakes (1959); Woodstock Stakes (1959); Fury Stakes (1959); Achievement Handicap (1959); Star Shoot Stakes (1959); Selene Stakes (1959); Canadian Oaks (1959); Nassau Stakes (1960); Canadian Maturity Stakes (1960); Whimsical Stakes (1960)

Awards
- Canadian Horse of the Year (1959); Wonder Where Stakes at Woodbine Racetrack

Honours
- Canadian Horse Racing Hall of Fame (2004)

Wonder Where (foaled 1956 in Quebec) was a Canadian Thoroughbred racehorse who was Canada's 1959 Horse of the Year and a Canadian Horse Racing Hall of Fame inductee.

== Background ==
Bred by Frank J. Selke at his Rolling Range Farm in Quebec, she was sired by Occupy, a multiple stakes race winner and the 1943 top money earner in the United States voted American Co-Champion Two-Year-Old Colt. Her dam was On the Fly, a granddaughter of U.S. Racing Hall of Fame inductee, Discovery.

Wonder Where was purchased at the 1957 Canadian Thoroughbred Horse Society yearling sale by prominent horsemen Larkin Maloney and Toronto Maple Leafs ice hockey team owner, Conn Smythe. She was sent to trainer Yonnie Starr for race conditioning.

== Racing career ==
Wonder Where the filly was sent to the track at age two where she won five of her eight starts including a win over her male counterparts in the Clarendon Stakes.

At age three, Wonder Where was the dominant horse in Canada, winning eight stakes races. She went up against male horses on a regular basis, winning twice, finishing second twice, and third once. Notably, in her win in the Woodstock Stakes, she defeated top colt and future Hall of Fame inductee, Anita's Son. Although she had never won a race at more than 1 1/8 miles (1.8 km), her handlers entered her in the 1 5/8-mile (2.6 km) Canadian International Stakes. The distance proved too much for the filly and in her only finish out of the money in 1959, she finished seventh.

Sent back to race at age four, Wonder Where made eight starts, winning five times.

== Breeding record ==
Wonder Where was retired at the end of the 1960 to serve as a broodmare under the auspices of co-owner Larkin Maloney. Her last foal was born in 1969. Of her offspring, the multiple stakes-winning filly Sno Where, sired by Northern Dancer, was the best performer on the track.

== Honours ==
Wonder Where's brilliant 1959 racing campaign outshone even that of New Providence, the first horse to win the Canadian Triple Crown. In the balloting for Canadian Horse of the Year honours, Wonder Where outpolled New Providence by more than two to one.

In recognition of her outstanding career in racing, in 2004 Wonder Where was inducted in the Canadian Horse Racing Hall of Fame. The annual Wonder Where Stakes at Toronto's Woodbine Racetrack is named in her memory.
