= Kennedy Road (horse) =

Canadian-bred Thoroughbred racehorse

- Sire: Victoria Park
- Grandsire: Chop Chop
- Dam: Nearis
- Damsire: Nearctic
- Sex: Stallion
- Foaled: April 18, 1968
- Country: Canada
- Colour: Bay
- Breeder: Angus Glen Farm
- Owner: Helen G. Stollery
- Trainer: James C. Bentley; Charlie Whittingham (at age 5)
- Record: 45: 17-12-3
- Earnings: $481,007

Major wins
- Colin Stakes (1970); Grey Stakes (1970); Cup and Saucer Stakes (1970); Plate Trial Stakes (1971); Queen's Plate (1971); Dominion Day Stakes (1972); Cabrillo Handicap (1973); San Diego Handicap (1973); San Antonio Handicap (1973); Hollywood Gold Cup (1973)

Awards
- Canadian Champion 2-Yr-Old Colt (1970); Canadian Champion 3-Yr-Old Colt (1971); Canadian Champion Older Male Horse (1972 & 1973); Canadian Horse of the Year (1973)

Honours
- Canadian Horse Racing Hall of Fame (2000); Kennedy Road Stakes at Woodbine Racetrack

Kennedy Road (April 18, 1968 – December 15, 1995) was a Canadian Thoroughbred Champion racehorse who dominated Canadian racing for three years before going to success in California.

== Background ==
He was bred by Canadian mining magnate Arthur W. Stollery at his Angus Glen Farm in Markham, Ontario, and raced under his wife Helen's name.

== Racing career ==
=== 1970-1972 Canadian career ===
After his two-year-old racing season in which he was voted the Canadian 2-Year-old Champion, Kennedy Road underwent an operation to remove a bone fragment from a hind ankle. His injury did not affect his racing ability, and in 1971 he won Canada's most prestigious race, the Queen's Plate, then was voted that year's Canadian 3-Year-old Champion. At age four, his performances earned him Canadian Champion Older Male Horse.

=== 1973 American career ===
At age five, Kennedy Road's owners sent him to California under the care of future U.S. Hall of Fame trainer Charlie Whittingham. In 1973, he won a number of races including the Grade I Hollywood Gold Cup and San Diego Handicap. In what appeared to be a dead heat, Kennedy Road finished second in the Santa Anita Handicap by a fraction of a nose to stablemate Cougar II. Brought back to Canada under junior trainer Clarke D. Whitaker, Kennedy Road set a track record in a six-furlong race at Woodbine Racetrack (1:08 3/5) that stood for more than two and a half decades. His 1973 performances earned him Canadian Horse of the Year honors.

Kennedy Road died in 1995. In 2000, he was inducted posthumously into the Canadian Horse Racing Hall of Fame.
