= Blue Bonnets (raceway) =

Horse racing facility in Montreal

Coordinates: 45°29′20.70″N 73°39′29.24″W

Blue Bonnets / Hippodrome de Montréal
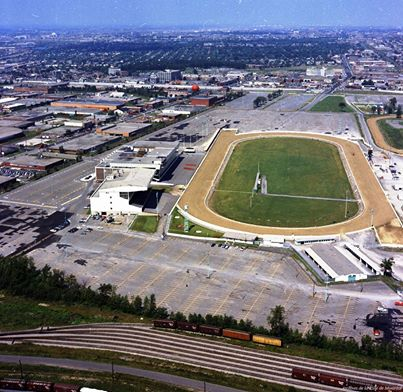
- Interactive map of Blue Bonnets / Hippodrome de Montréal
- Location: Decarie Boulevard; Montreal, Quebec, Canada
- Date opened: 1872 in Lachine; June 4, 1907, on Decarie Blvd.
- Date closed: October 13, 2009
- Course type: Flat (until 1973) and harness
- Notable races: Prix d'Été

The Blue Bonnets Raceway (later named Hippodrome de Montréal) was a horse racing track and casino in Montreal, Quebec, Canada. It closed on October 13, 2009, after 137 years of operation.

Demolition of the site began in mid-2018, after sitting abandoned and derelict for nearly a decade.

== History ==
In 1872, a hippodrome existed in Coteau Saint-Pierre. In 1905, John F. Ryan founded the Jockey Club of Montreal, which on June 4, 1907, opened the Blue Bonnets Raceway on Décarie Boulevard. In 1958, Jean-Louis Lévesque undertook major renovations that included building a multi-million-dollar clubhouse for the Blue Bonnets Raceway, and by 1961, it began to challenge the pre-eminence of the Ontario racing industry. From 1961 to 1975, the Raceway was home to the Quebec Derby, an annual horse race conceived by Lévesque.

Controversy erupted when the Namur metro station was built in close proximity to the Blue Bonnets Raceway. The Montreal Tramways Company had run streetcars right into the race track site. Some argued that the metro station site was chosen to benefit Blue Bonnets, but others argued that the tram stations would address future traffic problems. This controversy coincided with a failed Blue Bonnets development project.

In 1995, a municipal government corporation, the Société d'habitation et de développement de Montréal (SHDM), purchased the track and renamed it Hippodrome de Montréal. Owned and operated by the provincial government agency Société nationale du cheval de course (SONACC), it offered harness racing, inter-track wagering from the United States, off-track betting, two restaurants, and hundreds of video lottery terminals and slot machines.

=== Presidents ===
- H. Montagu Allan (1907–1920)
- J. K. L. Ross (1920–1931)
- Kenneth Thomas Dawes (1931–1933)
- Joseph Cattarinich (1933–1938)
- J.-Eugene Lajoie (1938–1939)
- Louis Letourneau (1939–1942)
- J. Eugene Lajoie (1942–1958)
- Jean-Louis Levesque (1958–1970)
- Raymond Lemay (1970–1973)
- Alban Cadieux (1973–1983)
- Andre Marier (1983–1994)
- Gilbert l'Heureux (1994–1995)
- Jacques Brulotte (1995–2000)
- Jean-Pierre Lareau (2000–2002)
- Richard Castonguay (2002–2007)
- Senator Paul Massicotte (2007–2009)

=== Press secretaries ===
- Charles Mayer (1950s)

== Bankruptcy and closure ==
On June 27, 2008, Attractions Hippiques entered bankruptcy protection, suspending horse racing and all other operations except its VLT gambling machines and inter-track wagering, which continued for a few more months. After the provincial government withdrew its support, Attractions Hippiques declared bankruptcy on October 13, 2009, and permanently closed the racetrack.

== Post-closure and uncertain future of the site ==
In July 2011, the rock band U2 used the site for a massive outdoor concert.

On March 23, 2012, the Government of Quebec announced it was returning ownership of the land to the City of Montreal, on the condition that it would receive half of the profits from any sale of the land. As per the agreement, the land could not be sold until 2017 and would require decontamination. In October 2014, it was brought to light that the government agreement was never signed or finalized, leaving the redevelopment project in limbo and its future in question. Plans to demolish the racetrack and clubhouse building by 2014 also fell through, leaving the buildings abandoned and grounds overgrown for nearly a decade. In the summer of 2018, demolition of the former racetrack finally began. As of late September 2025, the space is being used as an intermediary housing facility for the homeless under supervision of the Old Brewery Mission.
