= Quebec Derby =

Discontinued Canadian thoroughbred horse race

The Quebec Derby was a Canadian Thoroughbred horse race held annually between 1961 and 1975 at Blue Bonnets Raceway in Montreal, Canada. A race for three-year-olds on dirt, it was run over a distance of 1 1/8 miles (9.0 furlongs; 1.8 km).

The Blue Bonnets Raceway held only harness racing events at the time when prominent Canadian horseman Jean-Louis Levesque purchased the track in 1959. He brought Thoroughbred horse racing there on a seasonal basis. The Quebec Derby was the track's premier annual event for Thoroughbreds and Levesque himself would win the race five times with Royal Maple (1963), Pierlou (1964), Fanfreluche (1970), La Prevoyante (1973), and L'Enjoleur (1975).

Trainer Ted Mann, a 1982 Canadian Horse Racing Hall of Fame inductee, trained the first two winners of the Quebec Derby.

== Winners of the Quebec Derby ==
- 1975 - L'Enjoleur
- 1974 - Norland
- 1973 - La Prevoyante
- 1972 - Gentleman Conn
- 1971 - Green Belt
- 1970 - Fanfreluche
- 1969 - Sharp-Eyed Quillo
- 1968 - Phelodie
- 1967 - More of Mort
- 1966 - Bye and Near
- 1965 - Good Old Mort
- 1964 - Pierlou
- 1963 - Royal Maple
- 1962 - Fire Queen
- 1961 - Edgor's Lane
