= Canadian Horse of the Year =

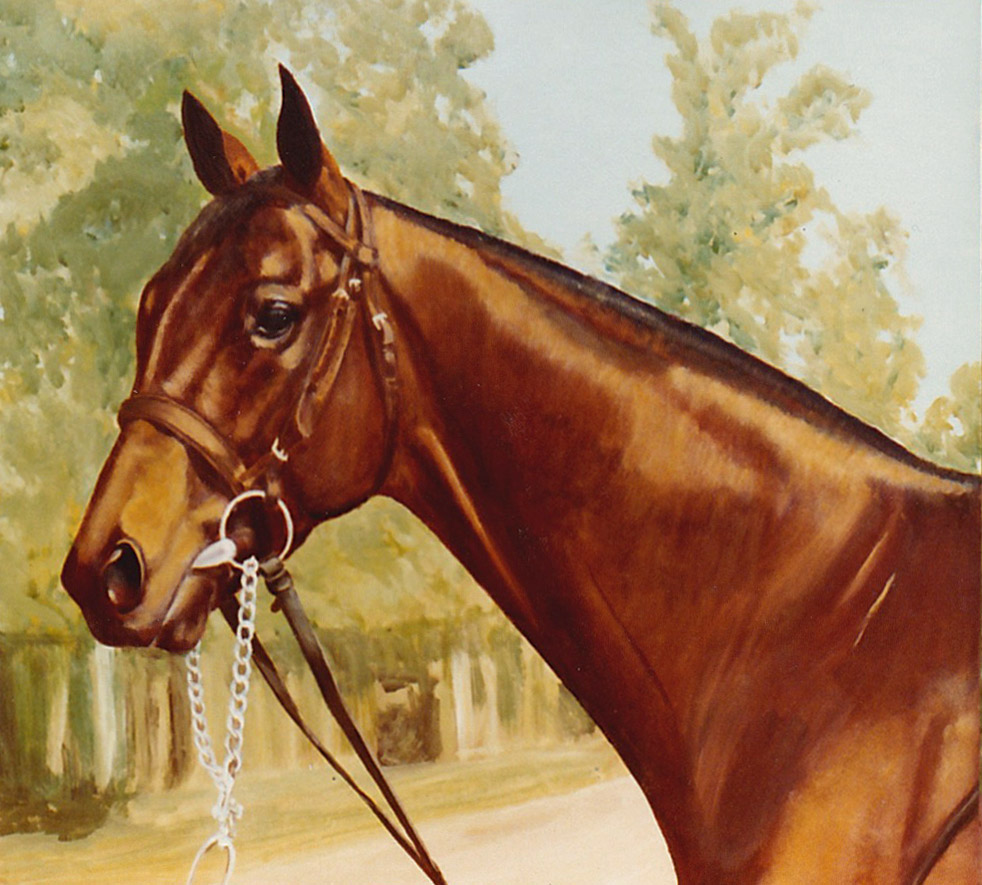
Norcliffe, painted by Bob Demuyser (1920–2003)

The Canadian Horse of the Year is a thoroughbred horse racing honour given annually since 1951 by the Jockey Club of Canada. It is the most prestigious honour in Canadian thoroughbred horse racing.

Part of the Sovereign Awards program since 1975, it is similar to the Eclipse Award for American Horse of the Year honours given in the United States.

The original eligibility rules stipulated that the winner be a Canadian-bred horse that did its "best running" in Canada. In 1964, the rule was altered for Northern Dancer, who was a Canadian-bred but whose most notable wins came in the United States when he won the Kentucky Derby and Preakness Stakes. Eventually the requirement that the horse be a Canadian-bred was also dropped. The current rules simply require that the horse have raced at least three times in Canada during the given year (two times for two-year-olds).

== Records ==
Most wins:

- 2 - L'Enjoleur (1974, 1975)
- 2 - Overskate (1978, 1979)
- 2 - Chief Bearhart (1997, 1998)

Most wins by a trainer:

- 6 - Gordon J. McCann (1951, 1952, 1954, 1958, 1963, 1968)

Most wins by an owner:

- 8 - Sam-Son Farm (1984, 1985, 1986, 1991, 1997, 1998, 2000, 2004)

== Honourees ==
Year	Horse	Age	Trainer	Owner
1951	Bull Page	4	Gordon J. McCann	E. P. Taylor
1952	Canadiana	2	Gordon J. McCann	E. P. Taylor
1953	King Maple	2	John Hornsby	Mrs. Gordon McMacken
1954	Queen's Own	3	Gordon J. McCann	E. P. Taylor
1955	Ace Marine	3	Yonnie Starr	Larkin Maloney
1956	Canadian Champ	3	John Passero	William R. Beasley
1957	Hartney	6	Patrick MacMurchy	Col. Kenric R. Marshall
1958	Nearctic	4	Gordon J. McCann	Windfields Farm
1959	Wonder Where	3	Yonnie Starr	Larkin Maloney & Conn Smythe
1960	Victoria Park	3	Horatio Luro	Windfields Farm
1961	Hidden Treasure	4	John Passero	William R. Beasley
1962	Crafty Lace	3	J. D. Mooney	Jeremy M. Jacobs
1963	Canebora	3	Gordon J. McCann	Windfields Farm
1964	Northern Dancer	3	Horatio Luro	Windfields Farm
1965	George Royal	4	Donald Richardson	E. C. Hammond & R. W. Hall
1966	Victorian Era	4	Lou Cavalaris Jr.	Windfields Farm
1967	He's A Smoothie	4	Warren Beasley	William R. Beasley
1968	Viceregal	2	Gordon J. McCann	Windfields Farm
1969	Jumpin Joseph	3	Warren Beasley	Warren Beasley
1970	Fanfreluche	3	Yonnie Starr	Jean-Louis Levesque
1971	Lauries Dancer	3	James C. Bentley	Helen G. Stollery
1972	La Prevoyante	2	Yonnie Starr	Jean-Louis Levesque
1973	Kennedy Road	5	Charlie Whittingham	Helen G. Stollery
1974	L'Enjoleur	2	Yonnie Starr	Jean-Louis Levesque
1975	L'Enjoleur	3	Yonnie Starr	Jean-Louis Levesque
1976	Norcliffe	3	Roger Attfield	Norcliffe Stable
1977	L'Alezane	2	Yonnie Starr	Jean-Louis Levesque
1978	Overskate	3	Gil Rowntree	Stafford Farms
1979	Overskate	4	Gil Rowntree	Stafford Farms
1980	Glorious Song	4	Gerry Belanger	Frank Stronach & Nelson Bunker Hunt
1981	Deputy Minister	2	Bill Marko	Kinghaven Farms & Centurion Farm
1982	Frost King	4	Bill Marko	Bill Marko & Ted Smith
1983	Travelling Victor	4	Robert G. Anderson	Russell & Lois Bennett
1984	Dauphin Fabuleux	2	James E. Day	Sam-Son Farm
1985	Imperial Choice	3	James E. Day	Sam-Son Farm
1986	Ruling Angel	3	James E. Day	Sam-Son Farm
1987	Afleet	3	Phil England	Richard R. Kennedy & Taylor Made Farms
1988	Play the King	5	Mark Frostad	Kinghaven Farms
1989	With Approval	3	Roger Attfield	Kinghaven Farms
1990	Izvestia	3	Roger Attfield	Kinghaven Farms
1991	Dance Smartly	3	James E. Day	Sam-Son Farm
1992	Benburb	3	Phil England	Knob Hill Stable
1993	Peteski	3	Roger Attfield	Earle I. Mack
1994	Alywow	3	Phil England	Kinghaven Farms
1995	Peaks and Valleys	3	James E. Day	Pin Oak Stable
1996	Mt. Sassafras	4	Barbara J. Minshall	Minshall Farms
1997	Chief Bearhart	4	Mark Frostad	Sam-Son Farm
1998	Chief Bearhart	5	Mark Frostad	Sam-Son Farm
1999	Thornfield	4	Phil England	Knob Hill Stable
2000	Quiet Resolve	5	Mark Frostad	Sam-Son Farm
2001	Win City	3	Robert P. Tiller	Frank Di Giulio Jr.
2002	Wake At Noon	5	Abraham R. Katryan	Bruno Schickedanz
2003	Wando	3	Michael Keogh	Gus Schickendanz
2004	Soaring Free	5	Mark Frostad	Sam-Son Farm
2005	A Bit O'Gold	4	Catherine Day Phillips	The Two Bit Racing Stable
2006	Arravale	3	Macdonald Benson	Robert Costigan
2007	Sealy Hill	3	Mark Casse	Melnyk Racing Stables
2008	Fatal Bullet	3	Reade Baker	Bear Stables Ltd.
2009	Champs Elysees	6	Robert J. Frankel	Prince Khalid Abdullah
2010	Biofuel	3	Reade Baker	Brereton C. Jones
2011	Never Retreat	6	Chris Block	Team Block
2012	Uncaptured	2	Mark Casse	John C. Oxley
2013	Up With The Birds	3	Mark Frostad	Sam-Son Farm
2014	Lexie Lou	3	Mark Casse	Gary Barber
2015	Catch A Glimpse	2	Mark Casse	Gary Barber, Windways Farm, James Michael
2016	Caren	3	Michael De Paulo	Robert Marzilli
2017	Pink Lloyd	5	Robert P. Tiller	Entourage Stable
2018	Wonder Gadot	3	Mark Casse	Gary Barber
2019	Starship Jubilee	6	Kevin Attard	Blue Heaven Farm
2020	Mighty Heart	3	Josie Carroll	Lawrence Cordes
2021	Mighty Heart	4	Josie Carroll	Lawrence Cordes
2022	Moira	3	Kevin Attard	Madaket Stables, SF Racing & X-Men Racing
2023	Fev Rover (IRE)	4	Mark E. Casse	Tracy Farmer
2024	Patches O'Houlihan	4	Robert Tiller	Frank Di Giulio Jr.
2025	Mansetti			Al Ulwelling, Bill Ulwelling
