= Yonnie Starr =

Canadian Hall of Fame racehorse trainer

Personal information
- Born: August 11, 1905 Kiev, Russian Empire (now Ukraine)
- Died: March 1990 (aged 84)
- Occupation: Trainer

Horse racing career
- Sport: Horse racing

Major racing wins
- Plate Trial Stakes (1955, 1958, 1959, 1961, 1966; 1969, 1973, 1982 (2)) Summer Stakes (1955, 1958, 1974); Nettie Handicap (1957, 1958); Princess Elizabeth Stakes (1957, 1969, 1972, 1977); Selene Stakes (1957, 1959, 1964, 1970, 1976, 1978); Clarendon Stakes (1958, 1961, 1964, 1970, 1974); Coronation Futurity (1958, 1960, 1974, 1978); King Edward Handicap (1958, 1969); My Dear Stakes (1958, 1963, 1968, 1972); Whimsical Stakes (1958, 1959, 1960, 1981); Canadian Oaks (1959, 1966, 1978); Star Shoot Stakes (1959, 1961, 1967, 1978); Cup and Saucer Stakes (1960, 1969, 1974); Queenston Stakes (1960 (2), 1968, 1971); Toronto Cup Stakes (1970, 1979); Gardenia Stakes (1972); Adirondack Stakes (1977); Bull Page Stakes (1978); Canadian Stakes (1980, 1981) Canadian Classic Race wins: Queen's Plate (1955, 1958, 1967, 1975); Prince of Wales Stakes (1955, 1968, 1975); Breeders' Stakes (1955, 1958, 1969)

Honours
- Canadian Horse Racing Hall of Fame (1979)

Significant horses
- Ace Marine, Caledon Beau, Fanfreluche, Jammed Lovely, La Prevoyante, La Voyageuse, L'Alezane, L'Enjoleur, Medaille d'Or

Joseph "Yonnie" Starr (August 11, 1905 – March, 1990) was a Canadian Hall of Fame Thoroughbred racehorse trainer about whom the Canadian Horse Racing Hall of Fame says has a "record unmatched in Canadian racing history."

Starr began his career in Thoroughbred racing as a jockey's agent, representing prominent jockeys such as Frank Mann, Pat Remillard, Red Pollard, and George Seabo. At the same time, in an unofficial capacity Starr became involved in the conditioning of horses. As an unlicensed trainer his first win in 1936 was not formally recognized as were the wins of other horses he trained between then and 1952 when he applied for his license.

Yonnie Starr earned his first Canadian Horse of the Year honors in 1955 with Ace Marine, a colt whose wins included the three races that four years later were officially designated as the Canadian Triple Crown series. In all, Starr won ten official Triple Crown Classics including four Queen's Plates. His horses earned ten Sovereign Awards and won a record seven Canadian Horse of the Year titles: Ace Marine (1955), Wonder Where (1959), Fanfreluche (1970), La Prevoyante (1972), L'Enjoleur (1974, 1975), L'Alezane (1977). Seven of the horses he trained were inducted in the Canadian Horse Racing Hall of Fame with one of them also elected to the U.S. United States Racing Hall of Fame.

Although Starr trained horses of both sexes, he was recognized as someone who also had a special talent to develop fillies. During his career he trained horses with great success for prominent owners such as Conn Smythe and Larkin Maloney, both individually and for the Smythe/Maloney racing partnership. In the 1970s and 1980s Starr continued as a dominant force in Canadian racing as the trainer for Quebec sportsman, Jean-Louis Levesque. In addition to training for others, he owned a few horses and notably trained Unbranded who won the 1954 Jockey Club Cup Handicap.

Yonnie Starr trained horses until his death in Florida in March 1990 at age eighty-four. At the time, he had been racing for the winter season at Gulfstream Park.
