= Jean-Louis Lévesque =

Canadian entrepreneur, thoroughbred racehorse owner and philanthropist

J. Louis Lévesque
- Born: April 13, 1911; Nouvelle, Quebec, Canada
- Died: December 28, 1994 (aged 83); Montreal, Quebec, Canada
- Resting place: Notre Dame des Neiges Cemetery
- Occupations: Businessman; Racehorse owner/breeder Philanthropist
- Board member of: Air Canada, Dupuis Frères, Canadian National Railways, Provincial Bank of Canada, General Trust of Canada, Equitable Insurance, Hilton Hotels of Canada
- Spouse: Jeanne Brisson
- Children: Andrée, Suzanne, Pierre-Louis
- Parent(s): Jean Lévesque & Catherine Greene
- Honors: Canadian Business Hall of Fame; Eleanor Roosevelt Humanitarian Award (1972); Order of Canada (1976); Order of St. Gregory the Great; National Order of Quebec (1991); Canadian Horse Racing Hall of Fame (1976); Sovereign Award for Outstanding Breeder (1978); Sovereign Award as Canadian horse racing's "Man Of The Year" (1983); Canada's Sports Hall of Fame (1986)

Jean-Louis Lévesque, CM OQ (April 13, 1911 – December 28, 1994) was a Canadian entrepreneur, thoroughbred racehorse owner, and philanthropist.

J. Louis Lévesque was born in Nouvelle in Quebec's Gaspé Peninsula to an Acadian father and an Irish mother. In 1934, he graduated with a B.A. degree from St. Dunstan's University in Charlottetown, Prince Edward Island. He then went to work for the Provincial Bank of Canada in Moncton, New Brunswick. After a few years in banking, his contacts led to an offer to join a Montreal securities firm as a stockbroker and his success led to his founding the investment firm Crédit Interprovincial Ltée. in 1941. Lévesque began buying small businesses that he believed were undervalued. He reorganized the companies and then sold some of them for a substantial profit while maintaining others where he saw long-term potential. He eventually merged his business with the securities firm L.G. Beaubien et Cie to form Lévesque, Beaubien Inc. Specializing in government bonds, his brokerage company replaced LJ Forget et Cie as the largest French Canadian securities firm in Canada.

Highly respected throughout the country for his business acumen, Lévesque was appointed by the Government of Canada to serve on the 1957 Royal Commission on energy that resulted in the creation of the National Energy Board. He was invited to sit on the board of directors of numerous large corporations such as Air Canada, Dupuis Frères, Canadian National Railways, Provincial Bank of Canada, General Trust of Canada, Equitable Insurance, and Hilton Hotels of Canada, among others.

J. Louis Lévesque had a special affinity with the bilingual city of Moncton, New Brunswick, and was appointed chancellor of the University of Moncton in 1967, serving until 1972. Following liftoff in his private jet from Miami, he once famously suggested a few Montreal friends to join him for a lobster dinner, his guests were, however, surprised to find out upon disembarking that they were rather in Moncton.

Having amassed a fortune, in his late sixties Lévesque set about planning his retirement with an eye to becoming more involved with the sport of horse racing. He began divesting himself of the various companies he controlled including the sale to Power Corporation of Canada of his holding company, TransCanada Funds. In 1988, the brokerage firm Lévesque, Beaubien Inc. became the cornerstone of National Bank Financial.

As well J. Louis Lévesque had owned through his holding companies Industrial Life, Provident Life, and Fred Lalemand yeast. He disposed of his main holding company Trans Canada Corporation in a reverse takeover transaction with Paul Desmarais Sr. after a long association with Desmarais whom he had initially financed in his entry to Quebec.

Among his many accolades, J. Louis Lévesque was voted into the Canadian Business Hall of Fame.

== Horse racing ==
In 1956, J. Louis Lévesque bought a few standardbred horses for harness racing and then began investing in thoroughbreds. Through one of his holding companies, he purchased Blue Bonnets Raceway in Montreal in 1958 where a few years later he added a schedule of Thoroughbred horse races. In addition, he acquired the Richelieu Raceway near Montreal and the Windsor Raceway in Windsor, Ontario. But it would be in Thoroughbred racing where Lévesque left his mark as a breeder and owner of champions. After hiring future Hall of Fame trainer, Yonnie Starr, in 1972 his two-year-old filly La Prevoyante went unbeaten and was voted the United States Eclipse Award for Outstanding 2-Year-Old Filly and the Canadian Sovereign Award for Horse of the Year. In 1975 he won the prestigious Queen's Plate with L'Enjoleur, who won a second consecutive Canadian Horse of the Year award. Levesque won the title for the first time in 1970 with Fanfreluche.

In 1976, La Prevoyante was part of the first group of inductees into the Canadian Horse Racing Hall of Fame. A daughter of Buckpasser, La Prevoyante was also inducted into the American Racing Hall of Fame in 1995. As well, Lévesque was part of the breeding syndicate that purchased the Triple Crown champion, Secretariat for a then-record price of $6.08 million.

A friend of prominent racing owners Bud McDougald and E. P. Taylor, in 1973 Lévesque became one of the founding members and a Trustee of the Jockey Club of Canada. He was inducted into the Canadian Horse Racing Hall of Fame in 1976 and in 1983 was voted the Sovereign Award as Canadian horse racing's "Man Of The Year."

Beyond horse racing, Lévesque was a driving force behind the creation of the Canadian Women's Open golf championship. Known at the time as La Canadienne, it was the first-ever LPGA tournament in Canada.

In 1986, Jean-Louis Lévesque was inducted into Canada's Sports Hall of Fame.

== Philanthropy ==
As a boy, Jean-Louis Lévesque lost his five-year-old sister to meningitis and his eleven-year-old brother to typhoid fever. Their deaths profoundly impacted him and as an adult, when he had made his fortune, he became a very substantial contributor to philanthropic causes such as hospitals and medical research.

The Lévesque Foundation, established in 1961 and today run by his daughter Suzanne Lévesque, has provided significant financial support to universities and other charitable organizations. Major benefactors include J. Louis Lévesque's alma mater, the University of Prince Edward Island, plus the University of Moncton in New Brunswick, and Laval and Concordia universities in Quebec. He donated to the Florida Heart Research Institute, where he had a winter home, and gave more than $10 million to the Montreal Heart Institute. Other medical institutions that have benefited from his philanthropic foundation include the Maisonneuve-Rosemont Hospital, the Royal Victoria Hospital, and the Montreal General Hospital. As well, Lévesque provided support for the Gaspé Museum in Gaspé, Quebec.

Included in his numerous laurels, Jean-Louis Lévesque received several honorary degrees from Canadian universities. In 1972 he and his wife were recipients of the Eleanor Roosevelt Humanitarian Award and the Pope made him a Commander of the Order of St. Gregory the Great. In 1976 he was made a member of the Order of Canada and in 1991 an officer of the National Order of Quebec.

Jean-Louis Lévesque died in Montreal on December 28, 1994, and was interred in the Notre Dame des Neiges Cemetery in Montreal.
