= Gallant Fox Handicap =

- Class: Discontinued stakes
- Location: Aqueduct Racetrack; Queens, New York, United States
- Inaugurated: 1939
- Race type: Thoroughbred – Flat racing
- Website: www.nyra.com/index_aqueduct.html

Race information
- Distance: 13 furlongs (1 5/8 mi; 2.6 km)
- Surface: Dirt
- Track: left-handed
- Qualification: Three-years-old & up
- Weight: Assigned
- Purse: US$65,000

The Gallant Fox Handicap is a discontinued Thoroughbred horse race in New York City which was run annually from 1939 through 2009. Hosted by the now defunct Jamaica Race Course in Jamaica, Queens from inception through 1957, it was then moved to Aqueduct Racetrack in the Borough of Ozone Park, Queens, New York. The race was open to horses age three and older and although contested on dirt at various distances for the most part it was a longer distance race.

The race was named for Gallant Fox, the second winner of the U.S. Triple Crown in 1930.

== Historical notes ==
The inaugural running took place on October 12, 1939 at the Jamaica track and was won by Belair Stud Stable's Isolater whose jockey, James Stout, and his trainer, Jim Fitzsimmons would both have careers that led to induction in the U.S. Racing Hall of Fame.

On December 13, 1975, Edward R. Scharps' gelding Sharp Gary won the 1 5/8-mile (2.6 km) Gallant Fox Handicap in track record time. Ten days later Sharp Gary won the 2 1/4-mile (3.6 km) Display Handicap, the longest major stakes event in North America. Future U.S. and Canadian Horse Racing Hall of Fame inductee Sandy Hawley was aboard Gary Sharp for both wins.

As a result of bad weather, the 2000 Gallant Fox Handicap was rescheduled and raced on January 1, 2001.

With long-distance racing steadily declining in popularity with fans, and breeding now almost exclusively designed for speed, after seventy one years the Gallant Fox was canceled following the 2009 edition.

== Records ==
Speed record:

- 2:40 2/5 @ 1 5/8 miles (2.6 km): Gary Sharp (1975)

Most wins:

- 3 – Coyote Lakes (2000, 2001, 2002)

Most wins by a jockey:

- 4 – Mike Luzzi (2000, 2002, 2005, 2007)

Most wins by a trainer:

- 4 – Max Hirsch (1942, 1946, 1947, 1950)
- 4 – H. Allen Jerkens (1957, 1958, 1965, 1983)
- 4 – Bruce N. Levine (1998, 2000, 2001, 2002)

Most wins by an owner:

- 4 – Roderick J. Valente (1998, 2000, 2001, 2002)

== Winners ==
Year	Winner	Age	Jockey	Trainer	Owner	Distance	Time (min:s)	Win$	Gr.
2009	Tiger's Rock	3	David Cohen	Todd A. Pletcher	Starlight Partners (Jack Wolf et al.)	1 5/8 mi (2.6 km)	2:47.34	$43,680	BT
2008	Delosvientos	5	Eddie Castro	Giuseppe Iadisernia	Giuseppe Iadisernia	1 5/8 mi (2.6 km)	2:49.33	$50,430	BT
2007	Nite Light	3	Mike Luzzi	Todd A. Pletcher	Edward P. Evans	1 5/8 mi (2.6 km)	2:47.45	$48,420	BT
2006	Successful Affair	4	Ramon Domínguez	Gary C. Contessa	Winning Move Stable	1 5/8 mi (2.6 km)	2:44.22	$41,886	BT
2005	Navesink River	4	Mike Luzzi	Todd A. Pletcher	Char-Mari Stable (Charles & Marianne Hesse)	1 5/8 mi (2.6 km)	2:44.96	$49,860	LR
2004	Tamburello	5	Norberto Arroyo Jr.	Michael Miceli	Michael Miceli	1 5/8 mi (2.6 km)	2:43.95	$49,620	LR
2003	Loving	7	Jose L. Espinoza	Richard E. Dutrow Jr.	Goldfarb, Roach et al.	1 5/8 mi (2.6 km)	2:45.08	$50,355	LR
2002	Coyote Lakes	8	Mike Luzzi	Bruce N. Levine	Roderick J. Valente	1 5/8 mi (2.6 km)	2:43.54	$67,320	G2
2001	Coyote Lakes	7	Chuck C. Lopez	Bruce N. Levine	Roderick J. Valente	1 5/8 mi (2.6 km)	2:44.77	$67,020	G2
2000	Coyote Lakes	6	Mike Luzzi	Bruce N. Levine	Roderick J. Valente	1 5/8 mi (2.6 km)	2:45.74	$69,240	G2
1999	Early Warning	4	Jorge F. Chavez	Todd A. Pletcher	Dogwood Stable	1 5/8 mi (2.6 km)	2:42.94	$68,820	G2
1998	Aavelord	4	Chuck C. Lopez	Bruce N. Levine	Roderick J. Valente	1 5/8 mi (2.6 km)	2:46.00	$66,360	G2
1997	Unreal Turn	5	Chuck C. Lopez	Frank Generazio Jr.	Patricia A. Generazio	1 5/8 mi (2.6 km)	2:46.60	$69,120	G2
1996	Ave's Flag	4	Jorge F. Chavez	Steve Klesaris	David P. McNulty & Josef F. Omland	1 5/8 mi (2.6 km)	2:45.80	$76,180	G2
1995	Yourmissinthepoint	4	John Velazquez	Steve Klesaris	Mark Parezo	1 5/8 mi (2.6 km)	2:45.20	$68,100	G2
1994	Serious Spender	3	Jorge F. Chavez	Dominick A. Schettino	John Caputo	1 5/8 mi (2.6 km)	2:44.80	$66,840	G2
1993	Michelle Can Pass	5	Mike E. Smith	John M. DeStefano Jr.	Jay Cee Jay Stable	1 5/8 mi (2.6 km)	2:46.00	$90,000	G2
1992	Michelle Can Pass	4	Aaron Gryder	John M. DeStefano Jr.	Jay Cee Jay Stable	1 5/8 mi (2.6 km)	2:45.80	$109,440	G2
1991	Challenge My Duty	4	Chris Antley	D. Wayne Lukas	William M. Rickman	1 5/8 mi (2.6 km)	2:47.00	$106,200	G2
1990	Power Lunch	3	Craig Perret	D. Wayne Lukas	Calumet Farm	1 5/8 mi (2.6 km)	2:47.00	$57,870	G2
1989	Passing Ships	5	Edgar Prado	Robert P. Klesaris	Gold-N-Oats Stable, Inc.	1 5/8 mi (2.6 km)	2:50.20	$72,600	G3
1988	Nostalgia's Star	6	Eddie Maple	C. R. McGaughey III	Mary J. Hinds	1 5/8 mi (2.6 km)	2:45.60	$80,820	G3
1987	Soar To The Stars	4	Julie Krone	C. R. McGaughey III	Ogden Mills Phipps	1 5/8 mi (2.6 km)	2:43.80	$85,860	G3
1986	Buckley Boy	4	Michael Gonzalez	John J. Tammaro Jr.	George C. Frostad	1 5/8 mi (2.6 km)	2:44.20	$82,860	G3
1985	Jane's Dilemma	4	Jorge Velásquez	J. William Boniface	Robert Meyerhoff	1 5/8 mi (2.6 km)	2:48.00	$63,720	G3
1984	Puntivo	4	Robbie Davis	Edward I. Kelly Sr.	Edward I. Kelly Sr.	1 5/8 mi (2.6 km)	2:45.80	$52,200	G3
1983	Dance Caller	3	Jimmy Miranda	H. Allen Jerkens	Hobeau Farm	1 5/8 mi (2.6 km)	2:45.80	$49,140	G3
1982	Bar Dexter	5	Jeffrey Fell	Lou Mondello	Woodside Stud	1 5/8 mi (2.6 km)	2:46.60	$51,120	G3
1981	Alla Breva	4	Richard Migliore	Philip G. Johnson	Ken-Mort Stable	1 5/8 mi (2.6 km)	2:43.40	$51,300	G3
1980	Relaxing	4	Ramon Encinas	Angel Penna Sr.	Ogden Phipps	1 5/8 mi (2.6 km)	2:42.40	$34,500	G3
1979	Identical	4	Eric Beitia	Pancho Martin	Viola Sommer	1 5/8 mi (2.6 km)	2:43.60	$33,840	G3
1978	Wise Philip	5	Ángel Cordero Jr.	William Boland	Ruth E. Streit	1 5/8 mi (2.6 km)	2:45.20	$32,250	G3
1977	Cunning Trick	4	Jean Cruguet	William H. Turner Jr.	William T. Pascoe	1 5/8 mi (2.6 km)	2:44.20	$32,850	G3
1976	Frampton Delight	4	Steve Cauthen	Everett W. King	Len Ragozin	1 5/8 mi (2.6 km)	2:46.00	$33,030	G3
1975	Sharp Gary	4	Sandy Hawley	Robert J. Frankel	Edward R. Scharps	1 5/8 mi (2.6 km)	2:40.40	$32,910	G3
1974	Big Spruce	5	Angel Santiago	Victor J. Nickerson	Elmendorf Farm	1 5/8 mi (2.6 km)	2:41.60	$33,450	G3
1973	Big Spruce	4	Angel Santiago	Victor J. Nickerson	Elmendorf Farm	1 5/8 mi (2.6 km)	2:42.00	$33,900	G3
1972	Crafty Khale †	3	Braulio Baeza	Robert L. Dotter	Mrs. Nelson I. Asiel	1 5/8 mi (2.6 km)	2:41.00	$33,720	
1971	Hitchcock	5	Ron Turcotte	Pancho Martin	Sigmund Sommer	1 5/8 mi (2.6 km)	2:42.80	$34,680	
1970	Hitchcock	4	Eddie Belmonte	Pancho Martin	Sigmund Sommer	1 5/8 mi (2.6 km)	2:41.60	$34,980	
1969	Ship Leave	3	Ángel Cordero Jr.	Angel Penna Sr.	Gustave Ring	1 5/8 mi (2.6 km)	2:42.60	$38,870	
1968	Funny Fellow	3	Braulio Baeza	Edward A. Neloy	Wheatley Stable	1 5/8 mi (2.6 km)	2:41.80	$38,025	
1967	Niarkos	7	Eddie Belmonte	John H. Adams	Hasty House Farm (Allie E. Reuben)	1 5/8 mi (2.6 km)	2:43.60	$37,895	
1966	Munden Point	4	John L. Rotz	Ira Hanford	Loren P. Guy	1 5/8 mi (2.6 km)	2:42.60	$37,895	
1965	Choker	5	Michael Venezia	H. Allen Jerkens	Hobeau Farm	1 5/8 mi (2.6 km)	2:48.00	$37,115	
1964	Smart	5	Eldon Nelson	Henry S. Clark	Christiana Stables	1 5/8 mi (2.6 km)	2:42.80	$52,748	
1963	Sunrise Flight	4	Larry Adams	Walter A. Kelley	Little M. Farm	1 5/8 mi (2.6 km)	2:43.00	$56,550	
1962	Sensitivo	5	Manuel Ycaza	Arnold N. Winick	Robert F. Bensinger	1 5/8 mi (2.6 km)	2:42.20	$57,752	
1961	Polylad	5	Herb Hinojosa	Thomas M. Miles	Mrs. Q. A. S. McKean	1 5/8 mi (2.6 km)	2:45.60	$54,210	
1960	Don Poggio	4	Sam Boulmetis Sr.	Robert L. Dotter	Gustave Ring	1 3/4 mi (2.8 km)	2:55.80	$53,100	
1959	Bald Eagle	4	Manuel Ycaza	Woody Stephens	Cain Hoy Stable	1 5/8 mi (2.6 km)	2:41.00	$54,350	
1958	Admiral Vee	6	Ted Atkinson	H. Allen Jerkens	Edward Seinfeld	1 5/8 mi (2.6 km)	2:43.40	$56,350	
1957	Eddie Schmidt	4	Ismael Valenzuela	H. Allen Jerkens	Leroy G. Burns	1 5/8 mi (2.6 km)	2:42.40	$59,800	
1956	Summer Tan	4	David Erb	Sherrill W. Ward	Dorothy Firestone Galbreath	1 5/8 mi (2.6 km)	2:41.60	$57,600	
1955	Misty Morn	3	Sidney Cole	James E. Fitzsimmons	Wheatley Stable	1 5/8 mi (2.6 km)	2:42.40	$58,450	
1954	Social Outcast	4	Ovie Scurlock	William C. Winfrey	Alfred G. Vanderbilt II	1 5/8 mi (2.6 km)	2:44.80	$60,550	
1953	Royal Vale	5	Jack Westrope	James E. Ryan	Esther du Pont Weir	1 3/16 mi (1.9 km)	1:55.40	$49,600	
1952	Spartan Valor	4	James Stout	Frank Catrone	William G. Hellis Jr.	1 3/16 mi (1.9 km)	1:56.20	$48,200	
1951	County Delight	4	Eric Guerin	James E. Ryan	Rokeby Stable	1 3/16 mi (1.9 km)	1:57.60	$47,900	
1950	Better Self	5	William Boland	Max Hirsch	King Ranch	1 3/16 mi (1.9 km)	1:57.00	$42,800	
1949	Coaltown	4	Steve Brooks	Horace A. Jones	Calumet Farm	1 3/16 mi (1.9 km)	1:56.20	$38,600	
1948	Faultless	4	Hedley Woodhouse	Horace A. Jones	Calumet Farm	1 3/16 mi (1.9 km)	1:57.20	$60,300	
1947	Stymie	6	Conn McCreary	Max Hirsch	Ethel D. Jacobs	1 5/8 mi (2.6 km)	2:42.40	$56,350	
1946	Stymie	5	Basil James	Max Hirsch	Ethel D. Jacobs	1 5/8 mi (2.6 km)	2:42.80	$59,050	
1945	Reply Paid	3	Herb Lindberg	George W. Carroll	Mrs. Louis Rabinowitz	1 5/8 mi (2.6 km)	2:44.60	$39,105	
1944	Some Chance	5	Albert Snider	B. Frank Christmas	Abram S. Hewitt	1 5/8 mi (2.6 km)	2:46.00	$37,565	
1943	Eurasian	3	Herb Lindberg	Sol Rutchick	Havahome Stable (Frank & Joseph Rabinovich)	1 5/8 mi (2.6 km)	2:48.00	$19,700	
1942	Dark Discovery	4	Warren Mehrtens	Max Hirsch	John A. Bell Jr.	1 5/8 mi (2.6 km)	2:44.20	$11,300	
1941	Market Wise	3	Wendell Eads	George W. Carroll	Louis Tufano	1 5/8 mi (2.6 km)	2:46.00	$11,550	
1940	Salaminia	3	Don Meade	Duval A. Headley	Hal Price Headley	1 5/8 mi (2.6 km)	2:43.60	$11,150	
1939	Isolater	6	James Stout	James E. Fitzsimmons	Belair Stud	1 5/8 mi (2.6 km)	2:43.00	$8,400	

- † In 1972, Autobiography finished first, but was disqualified and set back to second.

=== Other past and present North American marathon races ===
On dirt:

- Annual Champion Stakes
- Daingerfield Handicap
- Display Handicap
- Empire City Gold Cup
- Gallant Man Handicap
- Brooklyn Handicap
- Fort Harrod Stakes
- Tokyo City Cup
- Valedictory Stakes

On turf:

- American St. Leger Stakes
- Canadian International Stakes
- Carleton F. Burke Handicap
- San Juan Capistrano Handicap
