= Alphabatim =

Thoroughbred racehorse trained in Britain

- Sire: Verbatim
- Grandsire: Speak John
- Dam: Morning Games
- Damsire: Grey Dawn
- Sex: Stallion
- Foaled: 27 January 1981
- Country: United States
- Colour: Bay
- Breeder: Elmendorf Farm
- Owner: Khalid Abdullah
- Trainer: Guy Harwood; John Gosden
- Record: 22: 7-3-5
- Earnings: $1,313,175

Major wins
- William Hill Futurity (1983); Sandown Classic Trial (1984); Lingfield Derby Trial (1984); Hollywood Turf Cup (1984, 1986)

Awards
- Timeform rating 122 (1983), 126 (1984)

Alphabatim (27 January 1981 – 2004) was an American-bred, British-trained Thoroughbred racehorse and sire who won at the highest level in both Europe and North America. As a two-year-old in Britain in 1983, he showed great promise, winning two of his three races including the Group One William Hill Futurity. In the spring of the following year he won the Sandown Classic Trial and the Lingfield Derby Trial before finishing fifth when second favourite for the Epsom Derby. After finishing third in the St Leger he was transferred to race in the United States where he won the Hollywood Turf Cup in December. After missing most of the 1985 season with injury he returned in 1986 to post several placed efforts in top class events on both turf and dirt before ending his racing career with a second victory in the Hollywood Turf Cup. He later stood as a breeding stallion in Kentucky and Ireland but was not a conspicuous success as a sire of winners. He died in 2004 at the age of twenty-three.

== Background ==
Alphabatim was a big, good-looking bay horse with a small white star bred in Kentucky by the Elmendorf Farm. He was sired by Verbatim, a leading dirt performer in the United States whose wins included the 1969 Whitney Stakes. The best of his progeny included the North American Grade I winners Summing and Princess Rooney, but until the appearance of Alphabatim he was little known in Europe. Alphabatim's dam made no impact as a racehorse, finishing unplaced on her only start but produced several other winners. She was descended from the mare Summer Time, a full-sister to both Bull Lea and the influential broodmare Nectarine (the female-line ancestor of Sir Harry Lewis and Lookin At Lucky).

As a yearling, Alphabatim was consigned to the Keeneland sale in September 1982 and bought for $23,000 by representatives of the Saudi prince Khalid Abdullah. The colt was sent to race in Europe and entered training with Guy Harwood at Pulborough in West Sussex.

== Racing career ==
=== 1983: two-year-old season ===
Alphabatim began his racing career in a minor race over one mile at Goodwood Racecourse in September in which he finished third behind his stable companion Gambler's Cup. In early October the colt recorded his first success in the Soltykoff Maiden Stakes at Newmarket Racecourse, winning by four lengths from Longboat and nineteen other juveniles. In late October he was moved up in class for the Group One William Hill Futurity. The field appeared to be sub-standard, with the only previous Group race winner being the French-trained Mendez who started 11/8 favourite after winning the Prix des Chênes and finishing third in the Grand Critérium. Alphabatim, ridden by Greville Starkey, started 9/2 second choice in the betting ahead of Beldale Lear (a winner in Belgium) and the Michael Stoute-trained maiden Falstaff. Alphabatim turned into the straight in fourth place behind the outsiders Lake Valentina, Ilium and Petrizzo before moving up to take the lead from Ilium just inside the last quarter mile. He was immediately challenged by Mendez on the outside but stayed on well in the closing stages to beat the favourite by half a length with Ilium a head away in third.

=== 1984: three-year-old season ===
Alphabatim began his second season in the Guardian Classic Trial over ten furlongs at Sandown Park Racecourse in late April when he was ridden by Brian Rouse and started at odds of 4/1 against seven opponents. Carrying a seven-pound weight penalty as a Group One winner, he raced in second place, took the lead entering the straight and then drew away to win by 2 1/2 lengths from the Feilden Stakes winner Trojan Fen. In May he was moved up in distance to contest the Highland Spring Derby Trial over 1 1/2 miles at Lingfield Park Racecourse and started 2/5 favourite against four opponents. With Rouse again in the saddle he won "very easily" by six lengths from Get The Message. Lester Piggott took over from Rouse when Alphabatim contested the 205th running of the Epsom Derby in June. He appeared to be the leading British-trained contender and started the 11/2 second favourite behind the Irish colt El Gran Senor in a seventeen-runners field. He stayed on steadily in the straight but never looked likely to challenge the leaders and finished fifth behind Secreto, El Gran Senor, Mighty Flutter and At Talaq.

The Harwood stable had been in poor form in midsummer with Alphabatim among many horses to be reportedly suffering from a respiratory infection. The colt did not reappear until mid-August when he was moved up in distance and matched against older horses for the first time in the Geoffrey Freer Stakes over 13 1/2 furlongs at Newbury. He started the odds-on favourite but was beaten three lengths into second place by the Queen's Vase winner Baynoun, with the four-year-old filly Opale (later to win the Irish St Leger) in third place. On his last start in Europe, Alphabatim started at odds of 7/1 in the St Leger over 14 1/2 furlongs at Doncaster in September. After appearing to be struggling five furlongs out he stayed on well in the closing to finish third behind Commanche Run and Baynoun, beaten a neck and 1 1/2 lengths.

Plans to run the colt in the Prix de l'Arc de Triomphe were abandoned and he was sent to the United States for an autumn campaign, with John Gosden taking over as trainer. On his American debut he was equipped with blinkers when he contested the Washington, D.C.International at Laurel Park Racecourse in October. He led the field from the start, and opened up a clear advantage before fading rapidly in the straight and finishing eleventh of the thirteen runners behind Seattle Song. The blinkers were left off when the colt contested the inaugural Breeders' Cup Turf at Hollywood Park Racetrack and finished a close fifth behind Lashkari, All Along, Raami and Strawberry Road. Alphabatim was back at Hollywood Park in December for the Grade I over eleven furlongs in December. After tracking the leaders he took the lead on the final turn and won by 1 3/4 lengths from Raami with the Oak Tree Invitational winner Both Ends Burning in third place.

=== 1985: four-year-old season ===
On his first appearance as a four-year-old, Alphabatim finished third to Dahar in the San Marcos Handicap at Santa Anita Park in January. He missed the rest of the year with an injury to his left forefoot.

=== 1986: five-year-old season ===
Alphabatim returned after an absence of over a year to win an allowance race at Santa Anita in February 1986 and then finished fourth on dirt in the Grade I Santa Anita Handicap. Four placed efforts followed: he finished third in the San Luis Rey Handicap, third in a handicap at Golden Gate Fields, second in the Bel Air Handicap and second in the Hollywood Gold Cup. He then ran his only poor race of the season when he finished twelfth in the Arlington Million. After a seven-week break he returned to finish fourth in a handicap at Bay Meadows and then finished fifth to Skywalker in the Breeders' Cup Classic. On his final appearance he attempted to repeat his 1984 success in the Hollywood Turf Cup. Ridden by the veteran Bill Shoemaker he produced a strong late run on the wide outside and won by a head from Dahar, with Theatrical in third place. Shoemaker explained his decision to race wide by saying that when he rode Alphabatim in the Hollywood Gold Cup the horse showed that he "doesn't like to run on the inside". Gosden said "He's been a frustrating horse to train because you knew he was a good horse, but those foot problems kept getting in the way. I was getting him ready to run in the Hollywood Invitational (on the dirt last May), because I thought he could handle Flying Pidgeon and some of the others. But then on the morning of a prep race, he bruised the foot and was dead lame".

== Assessment ==
In the official International Classification of European two-year-olds, Alphabatim was rated twelve pounds behind the top-rated El Gran Senor. The independent Timeform organisation gave him a rating, of 123 eight pounds behind El Gran Senor, who was rated the best two-year-old of the year. In 1984 Timeform rated him on 126, ten pounds behind El Gran Senor, whilst the International Classification rated him seventeen pounds behind the Irish colt.

== Stud record ==
After his retirement from racing, Alphabatim stood as a breeding stallion in Kentucky for his owner's Juddmonte Farm. The best of his American progeny was probably Alphabulous, a filly who won the Grade III Gardenia Handicap in 1994. He was relocated to Ireland in 1993 and died in 2004 whilst based at the Rockmills Stud in County Cork. In Europe sired a few minor winners on the flat but his offspring had more success as a National Hunt stallion, with his best winners including Golden Alpha (Red Rum Handicap Chase) and Mr Nosie (Deloitte Novice Hurdle). He is also the damsire of the World Hurdle winner Cole Harden and the Chester Vase winner Ted Spread.

== Pedigree ==
Pedigree of Alphabatim (USA), bay stallion, 1981
Sire Verbatim (USA) 1965	Speak John (USA); 1958	Prince John*	Princequillo*
Sire Verbatim (USA) 1965	Speak John (USA); 1958	Prince John*	Not Afraid*
Sire Verbatim (USA) 1965	Speak John (USA); 1958	Nuit de Folies	Tornado
Sire Verbatim (USA) 1965	Speak John (USA); 1958	Nuit de Folies	Polle Nuit
Sire Verbatim (USA) 1965	Well Kept (USA); 1958	Never Say Die	Nasrullah
Sire Verbatim (USA) 1965	Well Kept (USA); 1958	Never Say Die	Singing Grass
Sire Verbatim (USA) 1965	Well Kept (USA); 1958	Bed O Roses	Preciptic
Sire Verbatim (USA) 1965	Well Kept (USA); 1958	Bed O Roses	Pasquinade
Dam Morning Games (USA) 1976	Grey Dawn (FR); 1962	Herbager	Vandale
Dam Morning Games (USA) 1976	Grey Dawn (FR); 1962	Herbager	Flagette
Dam Morning Games (USA) 1976	Grey Dawn (FR); 1962	Polamia	Mahmoud
Dam Morning Games (USA) 1976	Grey Dawn (FR); 1962	Polamia	Ampola
Dam Morning Games (USA) 1976	Major Play (USA); 1971	B Major	Summer Tan
Dam Morning Games (USA) 1976	Major Play (USA); 1971	B Major	Classic Music
Dam Morning Games (USA) 1976	Major Play (USA); 1971	Rich Royalty	Prince John*
Dam Morning Games (USA) 1976	Major Play (USA); 1971	Rich Royalty	Oil Princess (Family: 9-f)

* Alphabatim is inbred 3S x 4D to the stallion Prince John, meaning that he appears third generation on the sire side of his pedigree and fourth generation on the dam side of his pedigree.
