= Governor Stakes =

- Class: Discontinued Grade 1 stakes
- Location: Belmont Park, Elmont, New York, United States
- Inaugurated: 1969
- Race type: Thoroughbred - Flat racing

Race information
- Distance: 1 1/8 miles
- Surface: Dirt
- Track: Left-handed
- Qualification: Three-year-olds and up

The Governor Stakes was an American Grade 1 Thoroughbred horse race run annually at Belmont Park in Elmont, Long Island, New York. Held in early September, the race was open to horses age three and older and was contested on dirt over a distance of one and one-eighth miles (9 furlongs).

Inaugurated in 1969, the event was run as the Governor Nicholls Stakes for its first two years. The colonial governor was honored as the man who in 1665 established a horse racing track on Long Island's Hempstead Plains. The trophy presentation to the winning owner of the inaugural running was made by Frederick Fitzpatrick Rainsford, deputy Consul-General of the British consulate.

New York's Roosevelt Raceway also honored the Colonial Governor with a harness racing event named the Governor Richard Nicholls Pace.

Following the 1973 implementation of the Thoroughbred graded stakes race system in North America, the Governor Stakes was awarded Grade 1 status, giving it the highest ranking possible which was maintained until the race was discontinued following the 1975 edition.

== Historical notes ==
The September 2, 1969 inaugural running offered a purse of $100,000 added and saw both attendance and wagering set a Belmont Park record for a Labor Day program. The race was won by Verbatim. Owned by the Elmendorf Farm of Maxwell Gluck, Verbatim was trained by future Canadian Horse Racing Hall of Fame inductee Jerry Meyer and ridden by Pete Anderson.

Big Spruce won the 1974 Governor Stakes and went on to win Belmont Park's very important Marlboro Cup Invitational Handicap, a race that was a precursor to the Breeders' Cup Classic.

=== Wajima and the final Governor Stakes ===
Trained by Stephen DiMauro, in 1975 Wajima won what would prove to be the final edition of the Governor Stakes. A son of Bold Ruler, one of America's greatest Champion sires, Wajima was purchased as a yearling by James A. Scully for an unheard of $600,000. He in turn sold America greatest shares to Harold I. Snyder, James Welch, and Japan's preeminent breeder, Zenya Yoshida. Members of the racing industry and fans would watch closely, many believing that Wajima was an overpriced risk. In July 1975, the respected Louisville, Kentucky Courier-Journal published a story about the chances for success with such expensive Thoroughbred purchases titled "Is untried horseflesh worth that much?".

Raced by the owners under the nom de course East-West Stable, in 1974 Wajima won two of fours starts in his first year of racing but without a stakes win. He ended the year having won just $40,387. At age three the $600,000 colt was hampered early by leg problems and could not attempt a run at the U.S. Triple Crown series. Back in competition, on July 19, 1975, Wajima began to show what was to come with a win in the Marylander Handicap that broke the Bowie Race Track's record time for a mile and one-eighth. Within a few weeks Wajima was competing and winning in Grade 1 events. On September 1, in a race open to older horses, the three-year-old Wajima won a hard-fought Governor Stakes by a head over runner-up Foolish Pleasure, that year's Kentucky Derby winner. Also in the field was the legendary Hall of Famer Forego plus other very good runners including Stop The Music and another future Hall of Fame inductee, Ancient Title.

On September 13, Wajima won Belmont Park's rich Grade 1 Marlboro Cup Invitational Handicap. The New York Times report on the race carried the headline "Wajima Now Rated A $600,000 Bargain." A few weeks later, Wajima was syndicated for $7.2 million.

== Records ==
Speed record:

- 1:46.20 @ 1-1/8 miles: Big Spruce (1974)

Most wins by an owner:

- 2 - Elmendorf Farm (Maxwell Gluck) (1969, 1974)

== Winners ==
Year	Winner	Age	Jockey	Trainer	Owner	Dist. (Miles)	Time	Win $	Gr.
1975	Wajima	3	Braulio Baeza	Stephen A. DiMauro	East-West Stable (Zenya Yoshida et al.)	1-1/8 m	1:47.20	$69,180	G1
1974	Big Spruce	5	Michael Hole	Victor J. Nickerson	Elmendorf Farm	1-1/8 m	1:46.20	$70,020	G1
1973	Tentam	4	Jorge Velásquez	MacKenzie Miller	Cragwood Stables	1-1/8 m	1:46.80	$69,060	G1
1972	Loud	5	Jacinto Vásquez	James W. Maloney	William Haggin Perry	1-1/8 m	1:48.20	$71,160	
1971	Farewell Party	3	Robert Woodhouse	J. Elliott Burch	Rokeby Stable	1-1/8 m	1:47.20	$68,460	
1970	Distinctive	4	Walter Blum	Eugene Jacobs	Herbert A. Allen, Sr.	1-1/8 m	1:48.00	$75,920	
1969	Verbatim	4	Pete Anderson	Jerry C. Meyer	Elmendorf Farm	1-1/8 m	1:48.40	$70,110	
