= Epitome (horse) =

American-bred Thoroughbred racehorse

- Sire: Summing
- Grandsire: Verbatim
- Dam: Honest And True
- Damsire: Mr Leader
- Sex: Mare
- Foaled: April 21, 1985
- Country: United States
- Colour: Bay
- Breeder: Jessica Bell Nicholson & H. Bennett Bell
- Owner: John A. Bell III
- Trainer: Philip M. Hauswald
- Record: 14: 5-5-1

Major wins
- Pocahontas Stakes (1987); Breeders' Cup Juvenile Fillies (1987)

Awards
- American Champion Two-Year-Old Filly (1987)

Epitome (April 21, 1985 – November 12, 2004) was an American Thoroughbred racehorse and broodmare. After losing five of her first six races she recorded her first significant win in the Pocahontas Stakes, before establishing herself as one of the best fillies of her generation in North America by taking the fourth edition of the Breeders' Cup Juvenile Fillies. She was voted the American Champion Two-Year-Old Filly of 1987. She won two minor races from six starts in the following year before being retired from racing. She had a solid breeding record as a broodmare, producing eight winners including the UAE Derby winner Essence of Dubai.

== Background ==
Epitome was a bay mare bred in Kentucky by Jessica Bell Nicholson & H. Bennett Bell. She was sired by Summing, a stallion best known for winning the Belmont Stakes in 1981. Epitome's dam Honest And True was a high-class racemare who won the Fair Grounds Oaks and finished third in the Kentucky Oaks in 1980. As a descendant of the broodmare Bold Irish, Honest And True, was related to several major winners including Ruffian, Pine Bluff and Fusaichi Pegasus.

In 1986 the yearling filly was consigned to the Fasig-Tipton sale where she was sold for $150,000 to John A. Bell III of the Kentucky-based Jonabell Farm. The ownership of the filly stayed in the family as John Bell was the father of Epitome's breeders'. She was sent into training with Philip M. Hauswald.

== Racing career ==
=== 1987: two-year-old season ===
Epitome began her racing career by finishing fifth in a maiden race at Belmont Park on 28 June. She finished fifth again at the same track in July, second at Saratoga Race Course in August and third at Belmont in September before recording her first success in a maiden race at Keeneland on October 13. Eleven days later at the same track she was moved up in class and finished second to Terra Incognita in the Grade II Alcibiades Stakes. On November 8, Epitome took her first major prize when she won the Pocahontas Stakes at Churchill Downs. Thirteen days later, the filly contested the fourth running of the Breeders' Cup Juvenile Fillies at Hollywood Park Racetrack. Ridden by Pat Day, she came from six lengths off the pace in mid-stretch to win from Jeanne Jones with the Oak Leaf Stakes winner Dream Team in third.

=== 1988: three-year-old season ===
On her three-year-old debut, Epitome ran second to Lost Kitty in the Honeybee Stakes at Oaklawn Park on April 1. She was then off the track for more than five months before returning to win allowance races at Belmont in September and Keeneland in October. After finishing second in another allowance at Keeneland she was moved back up in class for the fifth running of the Breeders' Cup Distaff at Churchill Downs on November 5. Ridden by Pat Day she started at odds of 10.3/1 and finished seventh of the nine runners in a race which saw Personal Ensign complete an unbeaten career by beating the Kentucky Derby winner Winning Colors. On her final racecourse appearance, Epitome finished second to Top Corsage in the Falls City Handicap.

== Assessment and awards ==
In the Eclipse Awards for 1987, Epitome was named American Champion Two-Year-Old Filly.

== Breeding record ==
Epitome produced at least eleven foals and eight winners between 1990 and 2003:

- Faltaat, a bay colt, foaled in 1990, sired by Mr Prospector, won races in the United Arab Emirates
- Danjur, dark bay or brown colt, 1992, by Dayjur, won three races in the United States.
- Mansab, bay gelding, 1993, by Housebuster, won three minor races in Europe.
- Home Invader, dark bay or brown gelding, 1994, by Housebuster, won three minor races in the United States.
- Daiwa Dayjur, dark bay or brown colt, 1995, by Dayjur, exported to Japan
- Jordanesque, chestnut filly, 1996, by Mr Prospector, unraced
- Bully Bully, dark bay or brown gelding, 1998, by Holy Bull, won two minor races in the United States
- Essence of Dubai, dark bay or brown colt, 1999, by Pulpit, won five races including Norfolk Stakes, UAE Derby, Super Derby
- Albaaz, bay gelding, 2000, by Swain, won two minor races at Belmont Park in 2003
- Graham Cracker, dark bay or brown colt, 2001, by Cherokee Run, won one race
- Chinoe Road, chestnut filly, 2003, by Old Trieste, unraced

== Pedigree ==
Pedigree of Epitome (USA), bay mare, 1985
Sire Summing (USA) 1978	Verbatim (USA); 1965	Speak John	Prince John
Sire Summing (USA) 1978	Verbatim (USA); 1965	Speak John	Nuit de Folies
Sire Summing (USA) 1978	Verbatim (USA); 1965	Well Kept	Never Say Die
Sire Summing (USA) 1978	Verbatim (USA); 1965	Well Kept	Bed O Roses
Sire Summing (USA) 1978	Sumatra (USA); 1969	Groton	Nashua
Sire Summing (USA) 1978	Sumatra (USA); 1969	Groton	Register
Sire Summing (USA) 1978	Sumatra (USA); 1969	Sunda Strait	Aboukir
Sire Summing (USA) 1978	Sumatra (USA); 1969	Sunda Strait	Djambi
Dam Honest And True (USA) 1977	Mr Leader (USA); 1966	Hail To Reason	Turn-To
Dam Honest And True (USA) 1977	Mr Leader (USA); 1966	Hail To Reason	Nothirdchance
Dam Honest And True (USA) 1977	Mr Leader (USA); 1966	Jolie Deja	Djeddah
Dam Honest And True (USA) 1977	Mr Leader (USA); 1966	Jolie Deja	Bellesoeur
Dam Honest And True (USA) 1977	Tell Meno Lies (USA); 1971	The Axe	Mahmoud
Dam Honest And True (USA) 1977	Tell Meno Lies (USA); 1971	The Axe	Blackball
Dam Honest And True (USA) 1977	Tell Meno Lies (USA); 1971	Filatonga	Count of Honor
Dam Honest And True (USA) 1977	Tell Meno Lies (USA); 1971	Filatonga	Blarney Castle (Family:8-c)
