= Dunbeath (horse) =

American-bred Thoroughbred racehorse

- Sire: Grey Dawn
- Grandsire: Herbager
- Dam: Priceless Fame
- Damsire: Irish Castle
- Sex: Stallion
- Foaled: 23 March 1980
- Country: United States
- Colour: Bay
- Breeder: Eaton Farms Inc & Red Bull Stable
- Owner: Michael Riordan; Sheikh Mohammed
- Trainer: Henry Cecil; Charles E. Whittingham
- Record: 17: 4-4-3

Major wins
- Royal Lodge Stakes (1982); William Hill Futurity (1982)

Awards
- Timeform rating 127 (1982), 115 (1983)

Dunbeath (23 March 1980 – after 1996) was an American-bred Thoroughbred racehorse and sire. He was one of the best two-year-olds in Europe in 1982 when he won his last four races including the Royal Lodge Stakes and the William Hill Futurity. He was an early favourite for the following year's Epsom Derby but was beaten in all three of his races in 1983. He later raced with no success in the United States and was retired to stud at the end of the 1984 season. He had little impact as a breeding stallion.

== Background ==
Dunbeath was a bay horse with a narrow white blaze bred in Kentucky by Eaton Farms Inc & Red Bull Stable. He was sired by Grey Dawn, a French stallion best known for beating Sea-Bird in the 1964 Grand Critérium. As a breeding stallion, the best of his offspring included Vigors, Heavenly Cause, Christmas Past and Grey Classic. Dunbeath's dam Priceless Fame won two minor races before becoming a successful broodmare, also producing the Del Mar Futurity winner Saratoga Six. She was a full-sister to the Kentucky Derby winner Bold Forbes.

As a yearling in September 1981, Dunbeath was consigned to the Keeneland sale and was sold for $100,000. He entered the ownership of Michael Doyle Riordan and was sent to Europe where he entered training with Henry Cecil at the Warren Place stable in Newmarket.

== Racing career ==
=== 1982: two-year-old season ===
On his racecourse debut, Dunbeath contested the Plantation Maiden Stakes over seven furlongs at Newmarket Racecourse in early July. After looking very relaxed and lazy in the preliminaries he finished three quarters of a length second to St Boniface, with Muscatite in third. Later that month he opened his winning account in the Foxhall Maiden Stakes at Goodwood Racecourse over the same distance, beating Morcon easily by two lengths. At York Racecourse in September he won over seven furlongs, taking the lead two furlongs out, accelerating clear of his rivals and winning by four lengths from Tobina's Guest despite being eased down in the closing stages. At the end of the month the colt was moved up in class and distance for the Group Two Royal Lodge Stakes over one mile at Ascot Racecourse. Ridden by Lester Piggott he started the 5/2 favourite ahead of the Guy Harwood-trained Lyphard's Special and St Boniface. After settling at the rear of the field, he moved forward in the straight, took the lead inside the last quarter mile and won by one and a half lengths from Lyphard's Special with The Noble Player in third place.

A month after his win at Ascot, Dunbeath started 4/7 favourite for the Group One William Hill Futurity over one mile at Doncaster Racecourse. His participation had been in doubt as he had suffered an allergic reaction to a new batch of oats two days before the race, leading to swelling in his legs. Lyphard's Special was again in opposition, as well as Muscatite, the Gran Criterium runner-up Beldale Concorde and the previously undefeated Cock Robin. Piggott restrained the colt at the back of the field as Muscatite and the outsider Shackle Pin set the pace before making rapid progress in the straight. He took the lead approaching the final furlong, opened up a three length advantage, and was then eased down by Piggott to win by a length and a half from Cock Robin with Lyphard's Special in third.

After the Futurity, Dunbeath was bought by Sheikh Mohammed for a reported fee of £6 million. He entered the winter as the ante-post favourite for the 1983 Epsom Derby.

=== 1983: three-year-old season ===
Dunbeath began his second season in the Heathorn Stakes over ten furlongs at Newmarket in April. He was rumoured to be less than fully fit and finished a length second to the Michael Stoute-trained Shearwalk, to whom he was conceding five pounds in weight. Despite his defeat, the colt maintained his position at the head of the betting for the Derby. When he contested the Dante Stakes over ten and a half furlongs on soft ground at York Racecourse in May he was made the 1/2 favourite although his appearance was less impressive than usual as he sweated heavily in the pre-race paddock. After moving up to challenge the leaders early in the straight he began to struggle and faded to finish third behind Hot Touch and Guns of Navarone, beaten more than eleven lengths by the winner. Piggott felt that the colt had failed to stay the distance and Dunbeath did not run in the Derby. On his next appearance he was brought back to one mile for the St James's Palace Stakes over one mile at Ascot in June and finished third of the seven runners behind Horage and Tolomeo.

In August 1983 it was announced that Dunbeath would be sent to race in North America and would enter the stable of Charles E. Whittingham. He was expected to be rested for the remainder of the season and then prepared for the 1984 Arlington Million.

=== 1984: four-year-old season ===
In 1984 Dunbeath raced exclusively in California where he failed to recover his European form. He recorded two second places and one third in nine attempts, running mainly in allowance races. His only run in a Graded stakes race came in the San Bernardino Handicap at Santa Anita Park in April when he finished fifth behind Journey At Sea.

== Assessment ==
In the official International Classification for 1982, Dunbeath was rated the fifth-best two-year-old in Europe behind Diesis, Saint Cyrien, Danzatore and Gorytus. The independent Timeform organisation gave him a rating of 127, six pounds inferior to Diesis, who was their top-rated juvenile. He was rated 115 by Timeform in 1983.

== Stud record ==
At the end of his racing career, Dunbeath returned to Europe to become a breeding stallion. He stood in Britain and France before being exported to the Czech Republic. His last reported foals were born in 1997. The best of his flat runners was probably Radwell, who won the Solario Stakes in 1990. His offspring had some success under National Hunt rules and included the Great Yorkshire Chase winner Carbisdale.

== Pedigree ==
Pedigree of Dunbeath (USA), bay stallion, 1980
Sire Grey Dawn (FR) 1962	Herbager (FR); 1956	Vandale	Plassy
Sire Grey Dawn (FR) 1962	Herbager (FR); 1956	Vandale	Vanille
Sire Grey Dawn (FR) 1962	Herbager (FR); 1956	Flagette	Escamillo
Sire Grey Dawn (FR) 1962	Herbager (FR); 1956	Flagette	Fidgette
Sire Grey Dawn (FR) 1962	Polamia (USA); 1955	Mahmoud	Blenheim*
Sire Grey Dawn (FR) 1962	Polamia (USA); 1955	Mahmoud	Mah Mahal
Sire Grey Dawn (FR) 1962	Polamia (USA); 1955	Ampola	Pavot
Sire Grey Dawn (FR) 1962	Polamia (USA); 1955	Ampola	Blue Denim
Dam Priceless Fame (USA) 1975	Irish Castle (USA); 1967	Bold Ruler	Nasrullah
Dam Priceless Fame (USA) 1975	Irish Castle (USA); 1967	Bold Ruler	Miss Disco
Dam Priceless Fame (USA) 1975	Irish Castle (USA); 1967	Castle Forbes	Tulyar
Dam Priceless Fame (USA) 1975	Irish Castle (USA); 1967	Castle Forbes	Longford
Dam Priceless Fame (USA) 1975	Comely Nell (USA); 1962	Commodore M	Bull Lea
Dam Priceless Fame (USA) 1975	Comely Nell (USA); 1962	Commodore M	Early Autumn
Dam Priceless Fame (USA) 1975	Comely Nell (USA); 1962	Nellie L	Blenheim*
Dam Priceless Fame (USA) 1975	Comely Nell (USA); 1962	Nellie L	Nellie Flag (Family: 9-f)

* Dubeath is inbred 4S x 4D to the stallion Blenhaim, meaning that he appears fourth generation on the sire side of his pedigree, and fourth generation on the dam side of his pedigree.
