= Victor J. Nickerson =

American horse trainer (1928–2004)

Lefty Nickerson
Personal information
- Born: December 25, 1928 Boston, Massachusetts, United States
- Died: March 26, 2004 (aged 75)
- Occupation: Trainer

Horse racing career
- Sport: Horse racing
- Career wins: Not found

Major racing wins
- Whitney Stakes (1966); Jerome Handicap (1967); Bay Shore Stakes (1968); Discovery Handicap (1970); Lawrence Realization Stakes (1971); Firenze Handicap (1972); Lexington Handicap (1972); Coaching Club American Oaks (1973); Derby Trial Stakes (1973); Test Stakes (1973); San Luis Rey Handicap (1973); Gallant Fox Handicap (1973, 1974); Governor Stakes (1974); Marlboro Cup (1974); Secretariat Stakes (1974, 1981); Alabama Stakes (1975); Roamer Handicap (1977); Violet Handicap (1977, 1985); Brighton Beach Handicap (1980); Jockey Club Gold Cup (1981); Sword Dancer Handicap (1981); Excelsior Handicap (1982); Super Derby (1982)

Significant horses
- Big Spruce, John Henry, Verbatim

Victor J. "Lefty" Nickerson (December 25, 1928 – March 26, 2004) was an American Thoroughbred horse racing trainer. He embarked on a career as a professional trainer in 1953, working primarily at racetracks in the Northeastern United States. Late in his career he trained from a base at Santa Anita Park in California.

During his career, Lefty Nickerson conditioned Thoroughbreds for owners such as Harbor View Farm, Maxwell Henry Gluck of Elmendorf Farm, Pam & Martin Wygod, and Sam and Dorothy Rubin of Dotsam Stable. For the Rubins, Nickerson trained the great John Henry in 1979–1981, notably winning the Jockey Club Gold Cup, Sword Dancer Handicap and Brighton Beach Handicap. A mentor to future National Museum of Racing and Hall of Fame inductee, Ron McAnally, when the Rubins decided to send the gelding to race in California, Nickerson recommended Ron McAnally. However, on John Henry's trips back to New York to race, Nickerson would be the trainer of record.

Of Lefty Nickerson, Ron McAnally said: "Lefty could say one sentence and answer all the things I wondered about all my life. I didn't even have to ask. He just knew what to say all the time. I wanted to learn so badly, and he's such an intelligent guy, and not only as a horseman. I'd never been around anyone like him. He knew so much."

Nickerson suffered a stroke in 1997 and retired from racing. He died in his sleep at his home in Smithtown, New York.
