= Stage Door Johnny =

American Thoroughbred racehorse

- Sire: Prince John
- Grandsire: Princequillo
- Dam: Peroxide Blonde
- Damsire: Ballymoss
- Sex: Stallion
- Foaled: 1965
- Country: United States
- Colour: Chestnut
- Breeder: Greentree Stud
- Owner: Greentree Stable
- Trainer: John M. Gaver, Sr.
- Jockey: Heliodoro Gustine
- Record: 8: 5-2-1
- Earnings: $223,965

Major wins
- Belmont Stakes (1968); Dwyer Handicap (1968); Saranac Handicap (1968)

Awards
- TRA & DRF U.S. Champion 3-Yr-Old-Colt (1968)

Honours
- Aiken Thoroughbred Racing Hall of Fame
- Last updated on January 14, 2008

Stage Door Johnny (May 22, 1965 – November 21, 1996) was an American Thoroughbred racehorse best known for his win in the third leg of the 1968 U.S. Triple Crown series, the Belmont Stakes.

== Background ==
Stage Door Johnny was a chestnut horse with a white blaze, owned by the Whitney family's Greentree Stable. He was sired by Prince John, a four-time leading broodmare sire in North America. His grandsire was the important stallion Princequillo, a horse of great endurance who won several important races at longer distances. Princequillo broke the Saratoga Race Course record for 1¾ miles and his performances were such that he is considered by many to be the best long-distance runner in American racing history.

Stage Door Johnny's dam, Peroxide Blonde, was a daughter of the Irish stallion Ballymoss, winner of several races at the Belmont Stakes distance of 1½ miles including the Irish Derby, England's King George VI and Queen Elizabeth Stakes and France's Prix de l'Arc de Triomphe.

== Racing career ==
Stage Door Johnny did not run in the 1¼ mile Kentucky Derby or the 1 3/16 mile Preakness Stakes. Trained by future U.S. Racing Hall of Fame inductee John M. Gaver, Sr., he was bred and conditioned for success in the gruelling 1½ mile Belmont Stakes.

In 1968, a great deal of controversy swirled around the Belmont Stakes as Forward Pass had won the first two legs of the U.S. Triple Crown series as a result of the disqualification of Kentucky Derby winner Dancer's Image. The controversy filled the sporting news of every media outlet in North America and was the cover story for Sports Illustrated magazine, which referred to it as the sports story of the year. A victory by Forward Pass in the Belmont Stakes would make him the first Triple Crown winner in twenty years and many fans, experts, and CBS racing commentators felt he would be an illegitimate champion.

Ridden by Heliodoro Gustines, Stage Door Johnny ended the Triple Crown debate when he won the Belmont Stakes in 2:27 1/5 with Forward Pass second, a length and a half back. Stage Door Johnny also won the Saranac Handicap at the end of June, then July's Dwyer Handicap. At a time when three organizations voted on the various annual racing awards, the Thoroughbred Racing Association and Daily Racing Form voted Stage Door Johnny 1968's U.S. Champion 3-Yr-Old-Colt, while Forward Pass topped the poll organized by Turf & Sports Digest magazine.

== Stud record ==
Retired to stud duty at Greentree Stud in Lexington, Kentucky, Stage Door Johnny proved a successful sire of a number of stakes race winners, including:

- Johnny D. - winner of the 1977 Turf Classic Invitational Stakes who defeated some of the best horses from around the world in the Washington, D.C. International. He was voted the 1977 Eclipse Award for Outstanding Male Turf Horse.
- Late Bloomer - filly who was a multiple Grade I winner and voted the 1978 Eclipse Award for Outstanding Older Female Horse
- Open Call - wins included the 1981 Rothmans International Stakes
- Class Play - filly who won the 1984 Coaching Club American Oaks

Damsire of:

- Go for Gin, winner of the 1994 Kentucky Derby
- Open Mind, won Breeders' Cup Juvenile Fillies, voted American Champion 2-Year-Old Filly (1988), American Champion 3-Year-Old Filly (1989)

Stage Door Johnny died in November 1996 at the age of thirty-one and is buried at Greentree Stud, now part of the Gainesway Farm property.

== Pedigree ==
Pedigree of Stage Door Johnny, chestnut colt, 1965
Sire Prince John	Princequillo	Prince Rose	Rose Prince
Sire Prince John	Princequillo	Prince Rose	Indolence
Sire Prince John	Princequillo	Cosquilla	Papyrus
Sire Prince John	Princequillo	Cosquilla	Quick Thought
Sire Prince John	Not Afraid	Count Fleet	Reigh Count
Sire Prince John	Not Afraid	Count Fleet	Quickly
Sire Prince John	Not Afraid	Banish Fear	Blue Larkspur
Sire Prince John	Not Afraid	Banish Fear	Herodiade
Dam Peroxide Blonde	Ballymoss	Mossborough	Nearco
Dam Peroxide Blonde	Ballymoss	Mossborough	All Moonshine
Dam Peroxide Blonde	Ballymoss	Indian Call	Singapore
Dam Peroxide Blonde	Ballymoss	Indian Call	Flittemare
Dam Peroxide Blonde	Folie Douce	Caldarium	Brantôme
Dam Peroxide Blonde	Folie Douce	Caldarium	Chaudiere
Dam Peroxide Blonde	Folie Douce	Folle Nuit	Astrophel
Dam Peroxide Blonde	Folie Douce	Folle Nuit	Folle Passion (family: 1-1)
