= Verbatim (horse) =

American Thoroughbred racehorse

- Sire: Speak John
- Grandsire: Prince John
- Dam: Well Kept
- Damsire: Never Say Die
- Sex: Stallion
- Foaled: February 10, 1965
- Died: 1991
- Country: United States
- Colour: Dark bay or brown
- Breeder: Elmendorf Farm
- Owner: Elmendorf Farm
- Trainer: Jerry C. Meyer
- Record: 51: 11-10-7
- Earnings: $415,802

Major wins
- Gotham Stakes (1968); Bay Shore Stakes (1968); Bahamas Stakes (1968); Governor Stakes (1969); Whitney Stakes (1969)
- Last updated on April 29, 2020

Verbatim (1965–1991) was an American thoroughbred racehorse and sire.

== Background ==
Verbatim was a dark bay or brown bred horse in Kentucky at Elmendorf Farm. He was sired by Speak John, the 1985 Champion broodmare sire in North America. His dam was Well Kept.

== Racing career ==
Verbatim raced from 1967 to 1970 and has several wins including the Gotham Stakes in 1968, the Bay Shore Stakes in 1968, the Bahamas Stakes in 1968, the Governor Stakes in 1969, and the Whitney Stakes in 1969. In total Verbatim has 51 starts, 11 firsts, 10 seconds, 7 thirds, and a total earning of $415,802.

Verbatim was trained by Jerry C. Meyer, a Canadian Horse Racing Hall of Fame thoroughbred racehorse trainer.

== Stud record ==
Verbatim bred at Elmendorf Farm. His most notable progeny were Princess Rooney, Alphabatim, and Summing.

== Sire line tree ==
- Verbatim
  - Summing
    - Sumptious
    - Matthews Keep
  - Alphabatim
    - Golden Alpha
    - Mr Nosie

== Pedigree ==
Pedigree of Verbatim (USA) 1965
Sire Speak John (USA) 1958	Prince John; 1953	Princequillo	Prince Rose (GB)
Sire Speak John (USA) 1958	Prince John; 1953	Princequillo	Cosquilla
Sire Speak John (USA) 1958	Prince John; 1953	Not Afraid	Count Fleet
Sire Speak John (USA) 1958	Prince John; 1953	Not Afraid	Banish Fear
Sire Speak John (USA) 1958	Nuit de Folies (FR); 1947	Tornado	Tourbillon (FR)
Sire Speak John (USA) 1958	Nuit de Folies (FR); 1947	Tornado	Roseola (GB)
Sire Speak John (USA) 1958	Nuit de Folies (FR); 1947	Polle Nuit	Astrophel (FR)
Sire Speak John (USA) 1958	Nuit de Folies (FR); 1947	Polle Nuit	Folle Passion (FR)
Dam Well Kept (USA) 1958	Never Say Die; 1951	Nasrullah (GB)	Nearco (ITY)
Dam Well Kept (USA) 1958	Never Say Die; 1951	Nasrullah (GB)	Mumtaz Begum (FR)
Dam Well Kept (USA) 1958	Never Say Die; 1951	Singing Grass	War Admiral
Dam Well Kept (USA) 1958	Never Say Die; 1951	Singing Grass	Boreale
Dam Well Kept (USA) 1958	Bed O Roses (IRE); 1950	Preciptic (GB)	Precipitation (GB)
Dam Well Kept (USA) 1958	Bed O Roses (IRE); 1950	Preciptic (GB)	Artistic (GB)
Dam Well Kept (USA) 1958	Bed O Roses (IRE); 1950	Pasquinade (GB)	Pasch (GB)
Dam Well Kept (USA) 1958	Bed O Roses (IRE); 1950	Pasquinade (GB)	Fur Tor (GB)
