= James E. Ryan =

James E. Ryan may refer to:

- James E. Ryan (horse trainer) (1900–1976), American horse trainer
- Jim Ryan (politician) (1946–2022), American lawyer and politician
- James E. Ryan (educator) (born 1966), American educator, author, lawyer, and legal scholar
