= Iroquois Stakes =

The Iroquois Stakes may refer to:

- Iroquois Stakes (Churchill Downs), in Kentucky
- Iroquois Handicap, at Belmont Park
