= Big Spruce =

American-bred Thoroughbred racehorse

- Sire: Herbager
- Grandsire: Vandale
- Dam: Silver Sari
- Damsire: Prince John
- Sex: Stallion
- Foaled: 1969
- Country: United States
- Colour: Brown
- Breeder: Maxwell H. Gluck
- Owner: Maxwell H. Gluck
- Trainer: Victor J. Nickerson
- Record: 40: 9-9-7
- Earnings: US$673,117

Major wins
- Lexington Handicap (1972); San Luis Rey Handicap (1973); Gallant Fox Handicap (1973, 1974); Governor Stakes (1974); Marlboro Cup Invitational Handicap (1974)

Big Spruce (1969–2001) was an American Thoroughbred racehorse. He was an outstanding middle to longer distance runner on both dirt and grass called "one of North America's leading runners in the early 1970s" by the Thoroughbred Times.

== Background ==
Big Spruce was bred by Maxwell H. Gluck at his Elmendorf Farm in Kentucky and trained for Gluck by Lefty Nickerson.

== Racing career ==
Big Spruce won races in New York and California, including two Grade 1 events. As a three-year-old, he won the 1972 Lexington Handicap at Belmont Park then in 1973, he defeated future U.S. Racing Hall of Fame inductee Cougar II to win the San Luis Rey Handicap at Santa Anita Park and captured the first of his two consecutive editions of the Gallant Fox Handicap at Belmont Park. He ran second to Secretariat in the U.S. Triple Crown champion's last race, the Canadian International at Woodbine Racetrack in Toronto. That same year, he also finished second to U.S. Racing Hall of Fame filly Dahlia in the Washington, D.C. International at Laurel Park in Maryland. In 1974, he finished second to Dahlia again in the Canadian International. In 1974, Big Spruce won his second straight Gallant Fox Handicap as well as the Grade Ones Governor Stakes and defeated the great Forego to win the Marlboro Cup Invitational Handicap at Belmont Park.

== Stud record ==
Retired to stud duty for the 1975 season, Big Spruce sired forty-three stakes race winners including Acaroid, whose wins included the United Nations and Manhattan Handicaps, multiple stakes winners Berry Bush and Catatonic, and millionaire runner Super Moment, who won three consecutive editions of the Bay Meadows Handicap.

Big Spruce was retired from stud duties in 1997. Due to the infirmities of old age, on December 28, 2001, he was humanely euthanized at Gainesway Farm where he had stood throughout his stud career.
