= Super Moment =

American-bred Thoroughbred racehorse

- Sire: Big Spruce
- Grandsire: Herbager
- Dam: Seductive
- Damsire: Shantung
- Sex: Stallion
- Foaled: 1977
- Country: United States
- Colour: Bay
- Breeder: Elmendorf Farm
- Owner: Elmendorf Farm
- Trainer: Ron McAnally
- Record: 47: 10-8-5
- Earnings: US$1,017,940

Major wins
- Bay Meadows Handicap (1980, 1981, 1982); Santa Catalina Stakes (1980); Strub Stakes (1981); San Bernardino Handicap (1982); San Marcos Handicap (1982)

Super Moment (foaled 1977 in Kentucky) was an American Thoroughbred racehorse bred and raced by Maxwell H. Gluck's Elmendorf Farm. Racing in California for future Hall of Fame trainer Ron McAnally, Super Moment finished fourth in the 1980 Kentucky Derby and sixth in the Belmont Stakes. He won the 1981 Strub Stakes and the 1982 San Bernardino and San Marcos Handicaps but is best known for winning three consecutive editions of the Bay Meadows Handicap.

Retired to stud, Super Moment stood in the United States until 1989 when he was sent to breeders in Europe. He spent his final years of stallion duty in Czechoslovakia. His offspring have met with limited racing success.
