= Prince John (horse) =

American-bred Thoroughbred racehorse

- Sire: Princequillo
- Grandsire: Prince Rose
- Dam: Not Afraid
- Damsire: Count Fleet
- Sex: Stallion
- Foaled: April 6, 1953
- Country: United States
- Colour: Chestnut
- Breeder: Mrs. Fannie Hertz
- Owner: Elmendorf Farm
- Trainer: Walter A. Kelley
- Record: 9: 3-3-0
- Earnings: US$212,818

Major wins
- Garden State Stakes (1955)

Awards
- Leading broodmare sire in North America (1979, 1980, 1982, 1986)

Prince John (April 6, 1953 – January 26, 1979) was an American Thoroughbred racehorse called "one of the greatest broodmare sires of all time" by Bloodhorse magazine. Bred in Kentucky, he was sired by Princequillo, a two-time leading sire in North America and a nine-time leading broodmare sire. He was out of the mare Not Afraid, a daughter of 1943 U.S. Triple Crown winner and Hall of Fame inductee Count Fleet. Prince John was a full brother to Brave Lad.

On behalf of Max Gluck, a New York clothing retailer and owner of Elmendorf Farm, trainer Walter Kelley bought Prince John for $14,300 at the 1954 Keeneland Summer Sale from breeder Mrs. Fannie Hertz.

In his first seven starts at age two, Prince John won two allowance races. However, after his win over Needles and Career Boy in the October 29, 1955 Garden State Stakes in which he earned $157,918, the then-largest purse in racing history, Prince John was touted as a favorite for the 1956 Kentucky Derby. In his next start, he finished second on a sloppy track to Nail in the November 12 Remsen Stakes at Jamaica Race Course. A few days later at Hialeah Park Race Track in Florida, the colt broke loose from a stable boy and ran wild until he broke a bone in his foot. His handlers announced that Prince John would be out of racing for at least three months as a result.

In January 1956, Prince John was given 124 pounds in the Experimental Free Handicap ratings, third to Career Boy's 126 and second to the 125 assigned to Nail and Needles. However, he never recovered sufficiently from his injury and did not race again.

== Stud record ==
Prince John became a very important sire for Maxwell Gluck's Elmendorf Farm. In 1961, Leslie Combs II purchased an interest in him, and he was sent to stand at Combs' Spendthrift Farm in Lexington, Kentucky. Prince John became the leading broodmare sire in North America four years and was second in another two.

Among Prince John's offspring were:

- Speak John (b. 1958) - the leading broodmare sire in North America (1985)
- Stage Door Johnny (b. 1965) - won 1968 Belmont Stakes. American Champion Three-Year-Old Male Horse (1968)
- Typecast (b. 1966) - American Champion Older Female Horse (1972)
- Silent Screen (b. 1967) - 1969 American Champion Two-Year-Old Colt
- Deceit (b. 1968) - multiple stakes winner including the 1971 Acorn Stakes and Mother Goose Stakes
- Magazine (b. 1970) - won 1973 Coaching Club American Oaks
- Transworld (b. 1974) - won 1977 Irish St Leger

Prince John was the grandsire of Lonesome Glory, a five-time steeplechase champion. He was also the damsire of:

- Riverman (b. 1969) - won Poule d'Essai des Poulains, Leading sire in France (1980, 1981)
- Big Spruce (b. 1969) - multiple stakes winner including the 1974 Marlboro Cup Invitational Handicap
- Royal Chocolate (b. 1970) - won 1973 Queen's Plate
- Alleged (b. 1974) - 1977 European Horse of the Year, two-time winner of the Prix de l'Arc de Triomphe
- Summing (b. 1978) - won 1981 Belmont Stakes
- Cozzene (b. 1980) - 1985 American Champion Male Turf Horse, won 1985 Breeders' Cup Mile
- Palace Music (b. 1981) - Group One winner in England, 1995 Leading sire in North America, sire of Cigar, Naturalism
- Blushing John (b. 1985) - won multiple stakes races including the Group/Grade 1s Poule d'Essai des Poulains (1988) in France and Hollywood Gold Cup (1989) in the United States. Voted the 1989 American Champion Older Male Horse
- Northern Trick (ch. 1981) - winner of 1984 Prix de Diane and Prix Vermeille, second in Prix de l'Arc de Triomphe

Prince John died at age twenty-six in 1979 and was buried at Spendthrift Farm in Lexington, Kentucky. His influence can be seen in the pedigree of racing greats such as Cigar, Makybe Diva, Rock of Gibraltar, Secreto, Dream Well, Six Perfections, A P Valentine, and others.

== Sire line tree ==
- Prince John
  - Speak John
    - Verbatim
      - Summing
        - Sumptious
        - Matthews Keep
      - Alphabatim
        - Golden Alpha
        - Mr Nosie
    - Hold Your Peace
    - Text
  - Stage Door Johnny
    - One On The Aisle
    - Johnny D
    - Johnnys Image
    - Open Call
    - Southern Sultan
  - Silent Screen
  - Protagonist
  - Lefty
  - Transworld
    - The Hague
    - Winton
    - Lonesome Glory
