= Christmas Past =

American-bred Thoroughbred racehorse

- Sire: Grey Dawn
- Grandsire: Herbager
- Dam: Yule Log
- Damsire: Bold Ruler
- Sex: Filly
- Foaled: 1979
- Country: United States
- Colour: Gray
- Breeder: Cynthia Phipps
- Owner: Cynthia Phipps
- Trainer: Angel Penna Jr.
- Record: 14: 8-2-3
- Earnings: US$563,670

Major wins
- Coaching Club American Oaks (1982); Monmouth Oaks (1982); Ruffian Handicap (1982); Poinsettia Stakes (1982); Bonnie Miss Stakes (1982); Gulfstream Park Handicap (1983)

Awards
- American Champion Three-Year-Old Filly (1982)

Christmas Past (April 15, 1979 – December 13, 2008) was an American Thoroughbred Champion racehorse. She was the American Champion Three-Year-Old Filly of 1982 when her wins included the Coaching Club American Oaks and the Monmouth Oaks.

== Background ==
Christmas Past was bred and owned by Cynthia Phipps of the famous Phipps racing family. She was out of the mare Yule Log, a daughter of eight-time leading sire in North America and U.S. Racing Hall of Fame inductee Bold Ruler. Her sire was the 1964 French Champion Two-Year-Old Colt, Grey Dawn. She was conditioned for racing by Angel Penna Jr.

== Racing career ==
As a three-year-old in 1982, Christmas Past won five stakes races for fillies including the Coaching Club American Oaks by six lengths. Her performances earned her 1982 American Champion Three-Year-Old Filly honors.

At age four, Christmas Past defeated her male counterparts in winning the February 26 Grade 1 Gulfstream Park Handicap in Florida. It marked only the second time in the thirty-seven year history of the race that a filly had won. A week later her owner decided to retire her from racing saying it was because of a variety of minor physical ailments that could hamper her running especially when she would be required to compete under heavy handicap weights that could increase the risk of a serious injury.

== Retirement and stud ==
Retired to broodmare duty at Claiborne Farm in Paris, Kentucky, Christmas Past produced ten foals between 1985 and 2002, none of which won or placed in a stakes race.

At age twenty-nine, Christmas Past was humanely euthanized on December 13, 2008, due to complications from the infirmities of old age. She was buried in the Marchmont Cemetery at Claiborne Farm.
