= George Martens (jockey) =

American jockey

Personal information
- Born: September 23, 1958 (age 67) Elmont, New York, United States
- Occupation: Jockey

Horse racing career
- Sport: Horse racing
- Career wins: 686

Major racing wins
- Hill Prince Stakes (1975) Empire Classic Handicap (1976); Excelsior Handicap (1979); Bay Shore Stakes (1979); Cotillion Handicap (1980); Fashion Stakes (1980); Saranac Stakes (1980); Iroquois Handicap (1981); Pennsylvania Derby (1981); Pegasus Handicap (1981); United Nations Handicap (1981); Stymie Handicap (1982); Gardenia Stakes (1986); U.S. Triple Crown series: Belmont Stakes (1981)

Racing awards
- Eclipse Award for Outstanding Apprentice Jockey (1976)

Significant horses
- Summing, Key To Content, Cryptoclearance

George Martens (born September 23, 1958, in Elmont, New York) is a retired American jockey in Thoroughbred horse racing. He is best known for winning the 1981 Belmont Stakes, the third leg of the United States Triple Crown of Thoroughbred Racing.

In 1976, George Martens was the top rated apprentice jockey in the United States, voted the Eclipse Award as the country's Outstanding Apprentice Jockey. In 1981 he earned the most important win of his career when he rode Summing to victory in the Belmont Stakes.

Martens retired from riding in 1985 but returned to racing the following year. Following his permanent retirement, he has worked as an exercise rider at Belmont Park. Some of the horses he has prepped include Lemon Drop Kid, Touch Gold, Sharp Humor, and Colonial Affair.
