= Herbager =

French-bred Thoroughbred racehorse

- Herbager's grave at Claiborne Farm
- Sire: Vandale
- Grandsire: Plassy
- Dam: Flagette
- Damsire: Escamillo
- Sex: Stallion
- Foaled: 1956
- Died: 25 March 1976 (aged 19–20)
- Country: France
- Colour: Bay
- Breeder: M.L. Bara
- Owner: Simone Del Duca
- Trainer: Pierre Pelat
- Record: 8: 6-1-0
- Earnings: ₣850,510

Major wins
- Prix Seraphine (1958); Prix Greffulhe (1959); Prix Hocquart (1959); Prix du Jockey Club (1959); Grand Prix de Saint-Cloud (1959); Prix du Prince d'Orange (1959)

Awards
- Timeform rating: 136
- Last updated on 9 August 2017

Herbager (1956 – 25 March 1976) was a French Thoroughbred racehorse and an influential sire in both France and the United States.

== Background ==
Herbager was sired by Vandale, a stayer who won the 1946 Prix du Conseil Municipal and whom Herbager helped make the 1959 Leading sire in France. His dam was Flagette (by Escamillo), who was inbred 2x2 to St. Leger winner Firdaussi, meaning both her parents were sired by him.

During his racing career he was owned by Simone Del Duca and trained by Pierre Pelat.

== Racing career ==
Herbager made two starts at age two, finishing second once and winning the Prix Seraphine. At age three, he was the best colt in his age group in France, winning important races including the Grand Prix de Saint-Cloud and the Classic French Derby in which he earned a Timeform rating of 136. In the Prix de l'Arc de Triomphe, he sustained a serious leg injury but finished only two lengths from the winner. This injury ended his racing career.

== Stud record ==
Herbager was retired to stud for the 1960 season in France and in December 1964 was sold for US$700,000 to the prominent Kentucky breeder Bull Hancock. Hancock then syndicated Herbager and moved him to his Claiborne Farm. At Claiborne Farm, the horse sired sixty-four stakes winners and became a major stamina influence.

=== Major winners ===
c = colt, f = filly, g = gelding

Foaled	Name	Sex	Major Wins
1962	Grey Dawn	c	Grand Critérium, Prix de la Salamandre, Prix Morny. Leading broodmare sire in North America
1963	Appiani	c	Derby Italiano, sire of Star Appeal
1963	Sea Hawk	c	Critérium de Saint-Cloud, Grand Prix de Saint-Cloud, sire of Bruni, and Ines Fujin
1966	Dike	c	Breeders' Futurity Stakes, Wood Memorial Stakes
1967	Loud	c	Travers Stakes
1968	Gleaming	c	Hialeah Turf Cup Handicap
1969	Big Spruce	c	San Luis Rey Handicap, Marlboro Cup Invitational Handicap
1970	Bag of Tunes	f	Kentucky Oaks
1972	Yamanin	c	Widener Handicap
1974	Our Mims	f	Coaching Club American Oaks, Alabama Stakes
1974	Tiller	g	San Juan Capistrano, Tidal Handicap, Sword Dancer Handicap
1976	Anifa	f	Turf Classic Handicap
1977	Field Cat	c	Pan American Handicap

Damsire: Some of Herbager's daughters who produced foals that went on to racing success include:

- Ballade (1972), was purchased as a yearling by Canadian E. P. Taylor. As a broodmare, she stood at Taylor's Windfields Farm. Ballade was voted the 1992 Sovereign Award for Outstanding Broodmare. She was the dam of major stakes winners Glorious Song and Devil's Bag, plus Saint Ballado, who in turn sired 2005 American Horse of the Year Saint Liam as well as 2-time Eclipse Award winner Ashado
- Bete A Bon Dieu (1964) - dam of Buckskin, winner of the Prix du Cadran (2x), Jockey Club Cup, Doncaster Cup
- I Will Follow (1975) - dam of Rainbow Quest, winner of the 1985 Coronation Cup and Prix de l'Arc de Triomphe.

Herbager died on 25 March 1976 at the age of twenty at Claiborne Farm in Paris, Kentucky and is buried in their main equine cemetery.

== Sire line tree ==
- Herbager
  - Grey Dawn
    - Navajo
    - Vigors
      - Hodges Bay
      - Exemplary Leader
      - Royal Mountain Inn
    - Mr Redoy
    - Instrument Landing
    - Swing Till Dawn
    - Bounding Basque
    - Dunbeath
      - Carbisdale
      - Radwell
    - Grey Classic
    - Delegant
  - Paris Jour
    - Beyssac
      - Ali Baba
  - Appiani
    - Star Appeal
      - Star Way
        - Sky Chase
        - Filante
      - Kamiros
  - Francois Saubaber
    - Isopani
  - Sea Hawk
    - Bruni
      - Brunico
    - Matahawk
      - Valiant Heart
  - Dike
  - Loud
  - Russian Bank
    - Molotov
  - Gleaming
  - Big Spruce
    - Super Moment
    - Acaroid
  - Meadow Mint
    - Funny Hobby
  - Yamanin
  - Coined Silver
  - Tiller
  - Land of Eire
  - Field Cat

== Pedigree ==
Pedigree of Herbager, bay stallion, 1956
Sire Vandale bay 1943	Plassy b. 1932	Bosworth b. 1926	Son-in-Law
Sire Vandale bay 1943	Plassy b. 1932	Bosworth b. 1926	Serenissima
Sire Vandale bay 1943	Plassy b. 1932	Pladda b. 1926	Phalaris*
Sire Vandale bay 1943	Plassy b. 1932	Pladda b. 1926	Rothesay Bay
Sire Vandale bay 1943	Vanille b. 1929	La Farina ch. 1911	Sans Souci
Sire Vandale bay 1943	Vanille b. 1929	La Farina ch. 1911	Malatesta
Sire Vandale bay 1943	Vanille b. 1929	Vaya b. 1909	Beppo
Sire Vandale bay 1943	Vanille b. 1929	Vaya b. 1909	Waterhen
Dam Flagette chestnut 1951	Escamillo ch. 1939	Firdaussi* ch. 1929	Pharos*
Dam Flagette chestnut 1951	Escamillo ch. 1939	Firdaussi* ch. 1929	Brownhylda*
Dam Flagette chestnut 1951	Escamillo ch. 1939	Estoril ch. 1930	Solario
Dam Flagette chestnut 1951	Escamillo ch. 1939	Estoril ch. 1930	Appleby
Dam Flagette chestnut 1951	Fidgette ch. 1939	Firdaussi* ch. 1929	Pharos*
Dam Flagette chestnut 1951	Fidgette ch. 1939	Firdaussi* ch. 1929	Brownhylda*
Dam Flagette chestnut 1951	Fidgette ch. 1939	Boxeuse b. 1931	Teddy
Dam Flagette chestnut 1951	Fidgette ch. 1939	Boxeuse b. 1931	Spicebox (Family 16-c)

* Herbager is inbred 3D x 3D to the stallion Firdaussi, meaning that he appears third generation twice on the dam side of his pedigree.

* Herbager is inbred 4S x 5D x 5D to the stallion Phalaris, meaning that he appears fourth generation once on the sire side of his pedigree, and fifth generation twice (via Pharos) on the dam side of his pedigree.
