= Princequillo =

Irish-bred Thoroughbred racehorse

- Princequillo's grave at Claiborne Farm
- Sire: Prince Rose
- Grandsire: Rose Prince
- Dam: Cosquilla
- Damsire: Papyrus
- Sex: Stallion
- Foaled: 1940
- Country: Ireland
- Colour: Bay
- Breeder: Laudy L. Lawrence
- Owner: Mr. and Mrs. Anthony Pelleteri; Dimitri Djordjadze at Boone Hall Stable (claimed at age 2)
- Racing colors: Grey with 3 red roped clasp closings and a three looped soutache-like design around the buttons and a red cap (Dimitri Djordjadze colors)
- Trainer: Horatio Luro
- Record: 33: 12-5-7
- Earnings: $96,550

Major wins
- Saratoga Handicap (1943); Saratoga Cup (1943); Jockey Club Gold Cup (1943); Merchants and Citizens Handicap (1944); Questionnaire Handicap (1944)

Awards
- Leading sire in North America (1957 & 1958); Leading broodmare sire in North America (1966, 1967, 1968, 1969, 1970, 1972, 1973, 1976); Leading broodmare sire in Britain & Ireland (1971)

Honors
- Fair Grounds Racing Hall of Fame (2005)
- Last updated on October 30, 2021

Princequillo (1940–1964) was a Thoroughbred racehorse conceived in France and born in Ireland. He is known for his performances in long-distance races and his successes as a sire.

== Background ==
His sire, Prince Rose, stood at the Haras de Cheffreville stud farm in France and was mated to the mare Cosquilla. When World War II broke out, the pregnant mare was shipped to Ireland, where she gave birth to Princequillo. Considering the danger of German bombing and the likelihood that there would be no racing for some considerable time, Cosquilla's owners shipped her and her colt to the United States.

== Racing career ==
In July 1942, Princequillo made his American racing debut. After a few races, he was purchased by Boone Hall Stable, owned by Prince Dimitri Djordjadze of Georgia and his American-born wife, Audrey Emery. They placed him under the care of future Hall of Fame trainer Horatio Luro. Princequillo won several important races at longer distances. He broke the Saratoga Race Course record for 1¾ miles and his performances were such that he is considered to be the best long-distance runner, with the exception of Kelso, in American racing history.

== Stud career ==
Retired after his four-year-old racing season, Princequillo was purchased by Arthur B. Hancock and sent to the Hancock family's Ellerslie Stud in Albemarle County, Virginia and later to their Claiborne Farm near Paris, Kentucky. At stud, he sired 64 stakes winners and became one of the most important large-heart-producer stallions.

Foaled	Name	Sex	Major Wins/Achievements
1947	Hill Prince	Stallion	American Horse of the Year
1952	Misty Morn	Mare	American Champion Three-Year-Old Filly (1955), U.S. Champion Handicap Female
1954	Round Table	Stallion	American Horse of the Year
1956	Quill	Mare	American Champion Two-Year-Old Filly (1958)

Princequillo was the Leading sire in North America for 1957 and 1958 and Leading broodmare sire from 1966 through 1970 and again in 1972 and 1973. Among his daughters' progeny are Mill Reef, Fort Marcy, High Echelon, Triple Crown winner Secretariat, and Secretariat's chief rival Sham. His son Prince John was Leading broodmare sire in 1979, 1980, 1982 and 1986. Princequillo's descendants include Secretariat, Triple Crown Winner in 1973; Triple Crown winners Seattle Slew and American Pharoah; and U.S. Horse of the Year winners A.P. Indy, All Along, California Chrome, Cigar, Cody's Wish, Flightline, John Henry, Lady's Secret, and Zenyatta. He garnered the nickname Mr. Fixit at stud thanks to his ability to sire foals with good conformation and soundness.

Princequillo died of a heart attack in 1964 and is buried at Claiborne Farm.

== Sire line tree ==
- Princequillo
  - Hill Prince
    - Royal Living
  - Prince Simon
  - Prince Regent
  - Prince Hill
  - Dedicate
  - Prince John
    - Speak John
      - Verbatim
        - Summing
        - Alphabatim
      - Hold Your Peace
      - Text
    - Stage Door Johnny
      - One On The Aisle
      - Johnny D
      - Johnnys Image
      - Open Call
      - Southern Sultan
    - Silent Screen
    - Protagonist
    - Lefty
    - Transworld
      - The Hague
      - Winton
      - Lonesome Glory
  - Round Table
    - Baldric
      - Without Fear
      - Irish Ball
      - Kyoei Promise
    - Duel
    - Advocator
    - He's A Smoothie
    - Poker
    - Table Play
      - Telescopio
    - Dignitas
    - King's Bishop
    - Upper Case
    - Royal Glint
    - Targowice
      - McAdam
      - Prince Mab
      - Tipperary Fixer
      - Let's Go Tarquin
    - Apalachee
      - High Counsel
      - K One King
        - Halel
    - Cellini
    - Flirting Around
      - Wolf Power
        - Northern Wolf
    - King Pellinore
    - Easy Gallop
      - Uncle Merlin
    - Take Your Place
    - Artaius
      - Osumi Roch
    - Banquet Table
  - Prince Blessed
    - Old Bob Bowers
      - John Henry
  - Brave Lad
  - Earldom

== Pedigree ==
Pedigree of Princequillo, bay horse, 1940
Sire Prince Rose	Rose Prince	Prince Palatine	Persimmon
Sire Prince Rose	Rose Prince	Prince Palatine	Lady Lightfoot
Sire Prince Rose	Rose Prince	Eglantine	Perth
Sire Prince Rose	Rose Prince	Eglantine	Rose de Mai
Sire Prince Rose	Indolence	Gay Crusader	Bayardo
Sire Prince Rose	Indolence	Gay Crusader	Gay Laura
Sire Prince Rose	Indolence	Barrier	Grey Leg
Sire Prince Rose	Indolence	Barrier	Bar The Way
Dam Cosquilla	Papyrus	Tracery	Rock Sand (horse)
Dam Cosquilla	Papyrus	Tracery	Topiary
Dam Cosquilla	Papyrus	Miss Matty	Marcovil
Dam Cosquilla	Papyrus	Miss Matty	Simonath
Dam Cosquilla	Quick Thought	White Eagle	Gallinule
Dam Cosquilla	Quick Thought	White Eagle	Merry Gal
Dam Cosquilla	Quick Thought	Mindful	Minoru
Dam Cosquilla	Quick Thought	Mindful	Noble Martha (family 1-b)
