= Summing =

American Thoroughbred racehorse

- Sire: Verbatim
- Grandsire: Speak John
- Dam: Sumatra
- Damsire: Groton
- Sex: Stallion
- Foaled: April 16, 1978
- Country: United States
- Colour: Bay
- Breeder: Charles T. Wilson Jr.
- Owner: Charles T. Wilson Jr.
- Trainer: Luis S. Barrera
- Record: 23: 7-5-1
- Earnings: $615,096

Major wins
- Pennsylvania Derby (1981); Hill Prince Stakes (1981); Pegasus Stakes (1981); Triple Crown race wins: Belmont Stakes (1981)
- Last updated on September 28, 2007

Summing (April 16, 1978 – October 10, 2008) was an American thoroughbred racehorse and sire.

== Background ==
Summing was a bay horse bred in Kentucky by his owner Charles T. Wilson Jr. He was sired by Verbatim, a leading dirt performer whose wins included the 1969 Whitney Stakes. The best of his other progeny included Alphabatim and Princess Rooney. Summing's dam Sumatra was a high-class racemare whose wins included a division of the Santa Ysabel Stakes.

== Racing career ==
Until the detection of a blood infection, Summing performed so poorly that he was dropped from graded stakes races and entered in an allowance race. Once the infection was found, he was unable to compete in the Kentucky Derby and the Preakness Stakes, although two weeks before the Belmont he was well enough to win the Pennsylvania Derby.

Trained by Luis Barrera, brother of American Hall of Fame thoroughbred racehorse trainer Laz Barrera, Summing is best known for his upset over U.S. Champion 3-Yr-Old Colt Pleasant Colony in the Belmont Stakes with George Martens aboard. He won the race in a time of 2:29, spoiling Pleasant Colony's bid for the Triple Crown, as Pleasant Colony ran wide in the turn and placed third, behind Highland Blade.

In the fall, Summing won the Pegasus Stakes, then finished second in the Super Derby.

== Stud record ==
Summing was retired to Jonabell Farm, where he stood at stud until from 1982 to 1991. He was then sent to Getaway Farm in California. Summing was pensioned from study duties in September 2003 due to declining fertility and stood at the farm until he died in his sleep of natural causes at 30 years old in October, 2008.

His graded stakes race progeny include Epitome, Summer Matinee, and Matthews Keep.

== Pedigree ==
Pedigree of Summing (USA), bay stallion, 1979
Sire Verbatim (USA) 1965	Speak John (USA); 1958	Prince John	Princequillo
Sire Verbatim (USA) 1965	Speak John (USA); 1958	Prince John	Not Afraid
Sire Verbatim (USA) 1965	Speak John (USA); 1958	Nuit de Folies (FR)	Tornado
Sire Verbatim (USA) 1965	Speak John (USA); 1958	Nuit de Folies (FR)	Polle Nuit
Sire Verbatim (USA) 1965	Well Kept (USA); 1958	Never Say Die	Nasrullah* (GB)
Sire Verbatim (USA) 1965	Well Kept (USA); 1958	Never Say Die	Singing Grass
Sire Verbatim (USA) 1965	Well Kept (USA); 1958	Bed O Roses (IRE)	Preciptic (GB)
Sire Verbatim (USA) 1965	Well Kept (USA); 1958	Bed O Roses (IRE)	Pasquinade (GB)
Dam Sumatra (USA) 1969	Groton (USA); 1962	Nashua	Nasrullah* (GB)
Dam Sumatra (USA) 1969	Groton (USA); 1962	Nashua	Segula
Dam Sumatra (USA) 1969	Groton (USA); 1962	Register	Bimelech
Dam Sumatra (USA) 1969	Groton (USA); 1962	Register	Expression
Dam Sumatra (USA) 1969	Sunda Strait (USA); 1961	Aboukir (NZ)	Gold Nib (GB)
Dam Sumatra (USA) 1969	Sunda Strait (USA); 1961	Aboukir (NZ)	Egyptian Rose
Dam Sumatra (USA) 1969	Sunda Strait (USA); 1961	Djambi	Djeddah (FR)
Dam Sumatra (USA) 1969	Sunda Strait (USA); 1961	Djambi	Fairy Day (Family: 1-g)

* Summing is inbred 4S x 4D to the stallion Nasrullah, meaning that he appears fourth generation on the sire side of his pedigree and fourth generation on the dam side of his pedigree.
