= Speak John =

American Thoroughbred racehorse

- Sire: Prince John
- Grandsire: Princequillo
- Dam: Nuit de Folies
- Damsire: Tornado
- Sex: Stallion
- Foaled: 1958
- Country: United States
- Color: Bay
- Breeder: Elmendorf Farm
- Owner: Elmendorf Farm
- Trainer: Farrell W. Jones
- Record: 12: 4-2-0
- Earnings: US$36,460

Major wins
- Del Mar Derby (1961); Las Vegas Handicap (1961)

Awards
- Leading broodmare sire in North America (1985)

Speak John (1958–1980) was an American Thoroughbred racehorse who was the 1985 Champion broodmare sire in North America.

== Background ==
Speak John was bred and raced by Max Gluck's Elmendorf Farm. He was trained in California under trainer Farrell Jones.

== Racing career ==
Speak John recorded his biggest wins in the Del Mar Derby at Del Mar Racetrack in California and the Las Vegas Handicap at Bay Meadows.

== Stud record ==
Retired to stud duty at his birthplace near Lexington, Kentucky, Speak John sired a number of good runners including multiple stakes winner Verbatim, and the 1973 American Champion Two-Year-Old Filly, Talking Picture. Belle de Jour, another daughter of Speak John, was the dam of Spend A Buck, the 1985 Kentucky Derby winner and American Horse of the Year.

In 1985, Talking Picture's daughter, Easy To Copy, won the Group 2 Premio Legnano in Milan, Italy. Her winnings, along with those of Spend A Buck, earned Speak John Leading broodmare sire in North America honors in 1985. Speak John was also the damsire of 2005 Dubai World Cup winner, Roses in May, and to Overskate, voted an unprecedented nine Sovereign Awards while racing in Canada and the United States.

Speak John died on August 9, 1980, and was buried in the Elmendorf Farm cemetery.

== Sire line tree ==
- Speak John
  - Verbatim
    - Summing
      - Sumptious
      - Matthews Keep
    - Alphabatim
      - Golden Alpha
      - Mr Nosie
  - Hold Your Peace
  - Text

== Pedigree ==
Pedigree of Speak John, bay stallion, 1958
Sire Prince John	Princequillo	Prince Rose	Rose Prince
Sire Prince John	Princequillo	Prince Rose	Indolence
Sire Prince John	Princequillo	Cosquilla	Papyrus
Sire Prince John	Princequillo	Cosquilla	Quick Thought
Sire Prince John	Not Afraid	Count Fleet	Reigh Count
Sire Prince John	Not Afraid	Count Fleet	Quickly
Sire Prince John	Not Afraid	Banish Fear	Blue Larkspur
Sire Prince John	Not Afraid	Banish Fear	Herodiade
Dam Nuit de Folies	Tornado	Tourbillon	Ksar
Dam Nuit de Folies	Tornado	Tourbillon	Durban
Dam Nuit de Folies	Tornado	Roseola	Swynford
Dam Nuit de Folies	Tornado	Roseola	Roseway
Dam Nuit de Folies	Folle Nuit	Astrophel	Asterus
Dam Nuit de Folies	Folle Nuit	Astrophel	Dorina
Dam Nuit de Folies	Folle Nuit	Folle Passion	Massine
Dam Nuit de Folies	Folle Nuit	Folle Passion	Hot Bed (family: 1-l)
