= Iroquois Handicap =

- Class: Ungraded Stakes
- Location: Belmont Park; Elmont, New York; United States
- Inaugurated: 1979
- Race type: Thoroughbred – Flat racing
- Website: www.nyra.com/index_belmont.html

Race information
- Distance: 7 furlongs
- Surface: Dirt
- Track: left-handed
- Qualification: Fillies & Mares, three-years-old & up
- Purse: US$150,000

The Iroquois Handicap run at Belmont Park on Long Island, New York in the fall of the year, is a 7 furlongs (1,400 m) race for Thoroughbred fillies and mares, aged three and up, that are New York-bred. It offers a purse of $125,000.

Set at a mile and an eighth before 1981, at a mile from 1981 to 1984, a mile and 70 yards from 1985 to 1987, at six furlongs from 1989 to 1993, it is now at seven furlongs. In 1996, it ran at Aqueduct Racetrack.

The Iroquois Handicap is named for the Iroquois Indian Nation who still inhabit some of the region that now includes central New York State.

== Records ==
Speed record: (at current distance of 7 furlongs)

- 1:21.87 – Cluster of Stars (2013)

Most wins:

- 3 – Lottsa Talc (1994, 1995, 1996)
- 2 – La Verdad (2014, 2015

Most wins by a jockey:

- 3 – Michael Luzzi (2003, 2005, 2008)
- 3 – José Ortiz (2014, 2015, 2019)
- 3 – Javier Castellano (2011, 2013, 2016)

Most wins by a trainer:

- 3 – H. Allen Jerkens (1980, 1984, 1985)

Most wins by an owner:

- 2 – Hobeau Farm (1984, 1985)
- 2 – W. Alec Martusewicz (1986, 1987)
- 2 – Vincent McGuire & Charles (1995, 1996)

== Winners ==
Year	Winner	Age	Jockey	Trainer	Owner	Distance (F)	Time	To win
2021	The Important One	4	Jose Lezcano	Steve Asmussen	Bloom Racing Stable	6 1/2 F	1:18.03	$82,500
2020	Collegeville Girl	4	Joel Rosario	Richard Vega	Salvatore M. De Bunda, Robert Brittingham, & Wire to Wire Stable Inc.	6 1/2 F	1:16.48	$68,750
2019	Pauseforthecause	5	José Ortiz	Kiaran P. McLaughlin	Chester and Mary Broman Sr.	6 1/2 F	1:15.62	$86,625
2018	Highway Star	4	David Cohen	Rodrigo Ubilio	Chester & Mary Broman Sr.	6 1/2 F	1:16.08	$86,625
2017	Absatootly	4	Joe Bravo	Charlton Baker	Newman Racing	6 1/2 F	1:16.04	$90,000
2016	Quezon	4	Javier Castellano	Robert Ribaudo	Marc Keller	6 1/2 F	1:16.38	$90,000
2015	La Verdad	5	José Ortiz	Linda L. Rice	Lady Shelia Stable	6 1/2 F	1:15.96	$90,000
2014	La Verdad	4	José Ortiz	Linda L. Rice	Lady Shelia Stable	6 1/2 F	1:17.13	$90,000
2013	Cluster of Stars	4	Javier Castellano	Steve Asmussen	Turtle Bird Stable	7 F	1:21.87	$90,000
2012	Willet	4	Rajiv Maragh	James H. Iselin	James H. Iselin, Charlotte, & AssoulinEli Gindi	7 F	1:23.28	$90,000
2011	Risky Rachel	4	Javier Castellano	James H. Bond	Sanford Bacon	7 F	1:23.14	$75,000
2010	Meese Rocks	5	Ramon Domínguez	Edward R. Barker	Henry, Joseph & Jamie Terranova	7 F	1:23.64	$75,000
2009	Rightly So	3	Ramon Domínguez	Anthony W. Dutrow	Zayat Stables	7 F	1:24.64	$75,000
2008	Ice Cool Kitty	5	Michael Luzzi	Richard Dutrow Jr.	Lansdon Robbins III/Kevin Callahan	7 F	1:24.11	$75,000
2007	Karakorum Starlet	4	Garrett Gomez	Jeff Odintz	Karakorum Farm	7 F	1:24.04	$75,000
2006	No Reason	3	Garrett Gomez	Scott Blasi	Winter Park Partners	7 F	1:23.23	$75,000
2005	Seeking the Ante	3	Michael Luzzi	John C. Kimmel	Chester & Mary Broman	7 F	1:25.40	$75,000
2004	Sugar Punch	3	Edgar Prado	Richard Dutrow Jr.	IEAH Stables, Joe Torre, et al.	7 F	1:23.10	$75,000
2003	Princess Dixie	4	Michael Luzzi	H. James Bond	James F. Edwards	7 F	1:24.26	$75,000
2002	Dat You Miz Blue	5	José A. Santos	James A. Jerkens	Cynthia Knight	7 F	1:22.84	$75,000
2001	Maddie May	4	John Velazquez	Todd A. Pletcher	So Madcapt Stable	7 F	1:24.03	$75,000
2000	Biogio's Rose	6	Norberto Arroyo Jr.	Robert Ribaudo	Joseph & Alfred Nastasi	7 F	1:23.95	$75,000
1999	Jena Jena	3	Jerry D. Bailey	Steven W. Young	Michael King	7 F	1:23.40	$75,000
1998	Key Cents	5	John Velazquez	Peter Ferriola	Peter Ferriola & Martin Saks	7 F	1:24.80	$75,000
1997	Your Gorgeous	4	José A. Santos	Carl J. Domino	Kinsman Stable	7 F	1:23.60	$75,000
1996	Lottsa Talc	6	Frank Alvarado	Timothy D. Kelly	Vincent McGuire/Charles Werner	7 F	1:22.60	$75,000
1995	Lottsa Talc	5	Diane Nelson	Timothy D. Kelly	Vincent McGuire/Charles Werner	7 F	1:23.20	$75,000
1994	Lottsa Talc	4	Frank Alvarado	Timothy D. Kelly	Konrad Eggart, et al.	7 F	1:24.80	$45,000
1993	Princess Sybil	6	Mike E. Smith	Gerald E. Taylor	Lucy J. Taylor	6 F	1:11.00	$41,220
1992	Carli's Command	4	Richard Migliore	Gasper S. Moschera	Joques Farm	6 F	1:09.38	$52,740
1991	Northern Willy	6	Julio Pezua	Philip Cosme	James J. Kaulker	6 F	1:10.00	$52,290
1990	Jack Betta Be Rite	3	Dennis Saul	John J. Lambert	Star Trak Farm	6 F	1:11.60	$52,560
1989	Grecian Flight	5	Craig Perret	Joseph H. Pierce Jr.	Henry C. B. Lindh	6 F	1:13.00	$51,660
1988	Joe's Tammie	3	Eddie Maple	Jack Van Berg	James L. Paliafito	8 F	1:40.40	$52,740
1987	Anniron	4	Robbie Davis	Robert P. Lake	W. Alec Martusewicz	1m, 70yds	1:44.80	$42,120
1986	Anniron	3	Robert Cook	Robert P. Lake	W. Alec Martusewicz	1m, 70yds	1:44.80	$42,241
1985	Flip's Pleasure	5	Jean-Luc Samyn	H. Allen Jerkens	Hobeau Farm	1m, 70yds	1:42.60	$41,640
1984	Flip's Pleasure	4	Ángel Cordero Jr.	H. Allen Jerkens	Hobeau Farm	8 F	1:39.00	$46,440
1983	Chaldea	3	Jean-Luc Samyn	Thomas J. Skiffington Jr.	L. Riley Mangum	8 F	1:40.20	$34,800
1982	Belle Borne	3	Ángel Cordero Jr.	Eugene Jacobs	Peter Barberino	8 F	1:40.20	$34,560
1981	Josies Anchor	5	George Martens	Raymond A. Smith	Catco Stable	8 F	1:39.20	$34,200
1980	Screenland	3	Jacinto Vásquez	H. Allen Jerkens	Earle I. Mack	8.5 F	1:51.80	$32,040
1979	Wandering Cloud	4	Cash Asmussen	Thomas M. Waller	Tanrackin Farm	8.5 F	1:52.80	$31,260
