= Valedictory Stakes =

- Class: Grade III stakes
- Location: Woodbine Racetrack; Toronto, Ontario, Canada
- Inaugurated: 1952
- Race type: Thoroughbred - Flat racing
- Website: www.woodbineentertainment.com

Race information
- Distance: 1 1/2 miles (12 furlongs)
- Surface: Synthetic "all weather" dirt
- Track: left-handed
- Qualification: Three-years-old & up
- Weight: Three-Year-Olds: 122 lbs. Older horses: 124 lbs. Allowances
- Purse: Can$150,000
- Bonuses: $30,000 for eligible Ontario-breds

The Valedictory Stakes is a Canadian Thoroughbred horse race run annually in late November or early December at Woodbine Racetrack in Toronto, Ontario. Open to horses age three and older, the Grade III stakes is contested on a synthetic "all weather" surface over a distance of 1 1/2 miles (12 furlongs).

== History ==
Inaugurated as the Valedictory Handicap in 1952 at the Dufferin Park Racetrack, it was moved to the new Woodbine Racetrack for the 1956 running where it remained through 1960. From 1961 through 1993, the race was hosted by Greenwood Raceway; thereafter, the race returned to Woodine where it remains.

The Valedictory was originally run on dirt but in 2006 Woodbine switched to a synthetic "all weather" surface (originally Polytrack and then Tapeta starting in 2016). Always a longer distance race, over the years it has been contested at a variety of distances:

- 1952: 1 5/8 miles
- 1954–1955: 1 3/8 miles
- 1956–2019: 1 3/4 miles
- 2021-Present: 1 1/2 miles

The Valedictory was not run in 1953. The 2008 Valedictory was canceled due to extreme cold weather, while the 2020 edition was cancelled due to the COVID-19 pandemic.

The Valedictory was upgraded to grade III status in 2011. It is the final stakes event of the year at Woodbine racetrack, which is closed to Thoroughbred racing during the winter.

== Records ==
Speed record:

- 2:31.10 - Who's The Star, Wentru (2022 - Dead heat) (At current distance of 1 1/2 miles)

Most wins:

- 2 - Bernfield (1957, 1958)
- 2 - Whiteborough (1962, 1963)
- 2 - Caesar B. Good (1967, 1968)
- 2 - Knight's Turn (1979, 1980)
- 2 - Pumpkin Rumble (2018, 2019)

Most wins by a jockey:

- 5 - Patrick Husbands (2005, 2010, 2011, 2017, 2021)
- 5 - Emma-Jayne Wilson (2006, 2012, 2014, 2016, 2022)

Most wins by a trainer:

- 7 - Mark E. Casse (2003, 2010, 2017, 2021, 2022, 2023, 2024)

Most wins by an owner:

- 7 - George R. Gardiner (1961, 1964, 1970, 1972, 1974, 1976, 1994)
- 7 - Gardiner Farms (1961, 1964, 1970, 1972, 1974, 1976, 1994)

== Winners ==
Year	Winner	Age	Jockey	Trainer	Owner	Distance	Time
2025	Hammerhead	3	Daisuke Fukumoto	Kevin Attard	Gold Square LLC	1 1/2 miles	2:34.40
2024	Get Smokin	7	Sahin Civaci	Mark E. Casse	Ironhorse Racing Stable LLC, BlackRidge Stables LLC, Saratoga Seven Racing Partners LLC and T-N-T Equine Holdings LLC	1 1/2 miles	2:31.64
2023	Conglomerate	6	Luis Contreras	Mark E. Casse	Gary Barber	1 1/2 miles	2:31.49
2022	Who's the Star Wentru (DH)	4 4	Emma-Jayne Wilson Rafael M. Hernandez	Mark E. Casse Martin Drexler	M Racing Group TEC Racing	1 1/2 miles	2:31.10
2021	Sir Winston	5	Patrick Husbands	Mark E. Casse	Tracy Farmer	1 1/2 miles	2:31.51
2020	Race Not Ran						
2019	Pumpkin Rumble	8	Eurico Rosa da Silva	Kevin Attard	Al & Bill Ulwelling	1 3/4 miles	2:57.67
2018	Pumpkin Rumble	7	Eurico Rosa da Silva	Kevin Attard	Al & Bill Ulwelling	1 3/4 miles	2:56.16
2017	Leavem in Malibu	4	Patrick Husbands	Mark E. Casse	Gary Barber & Conrad Farms	1 3/4 miles	2:58.92
2016	Bangkok	5	Emma-Jayne Wilson	W. Phillip Gracey	Gail Wood & Ruth Barbour	1 3/4 miles	2:59.88
2015	Melmich	4	Eurico Rosa Da Silva	Kevin Attard	Stephen Chesney & Cory S. Hoffman	1 3/4 miles	2:55.81
2014	Turkish	5	Emma-Jayne Wilson	Tino Attard	Lawrence Cordes	1 3/4 miles	3:02.09
2013	Quaesitor	7	Gerry Olguin	Ian Howard	Wayward Stable	1 3/4 miles	2:59.42
2012	Heathcote	4	Emma-Jayne Wilson	Paul Attard	Chiefswood Stables	1 3/4 miles	2:59.42
2011	Eagle Poise	5	Patrick Husbands	Graham Motion	Riverdee Stable	1 3/4 miles	2:57.62
2010	Pool Play	5	Patrick Husbands	Mark E. Casse	William S. Farish, Jr.	1 3/4 miles	3:01.42
2009	Cloudy's Knight	9	Rosemary Homeister, Jr.	Jonathan E. Sheppard	S J Stables LLC	1 3/4 miles	2:59.32
2008	Race Not Ran						
2007	Torquay	5	Eurico Rosa Da Silva	Nickolas DeToro	Nickolas DeToro	1 3/4 miles	3:01.08
2006	Marsh Side	3	Emma-Jayne Wilson	Michael Dickinson	Robert S. Evans	1 3/4 miles	2:58.27
2005	Seattlespectacular	5	Patrick Husbands	Sid C. Attard	RWP Corp. Inc.	1 3/4 miles	3:01.81
2004	Daddy Cool	6	James McAleney	Sean Smullen	Stronach Stable	1 3/4 miles	3:03.52
2003	Hydrogen	4	Emile Ramsammy	Mark E. Casse	Earle I. Mack	1 3/4 miles	3:00.28
2002	Lucky Molar	7	Chantal Sutherland	Michael Wright Jr.	Richard A. Englander	1 3/4 miles	3:03.83
2001	Queensgate	5	Gerry Olguin	Tino Attard	Carmen Attard	1 3/4 miles	2:57.37
2000	A Fleets Dancer	5	Robert Landry	Roger Attfield	Cam Allard	1 3/4 miles	3:05.49
1999	Salty Note	4	David Clark	Alec Fehr	Bruno Schickedanz	1 3/4 miles	2:58.57
1998	Sunshine Journey	4	Richard Dos Ramos	John P. MacKenzie	Rudy Singh	1 3/4 miles	2:58.00
1997	Cimarron Secret	6	Emile Ramsammy	Jim Hartley	Francis C. McDonnell	1 3/4 miles	2:59.00
1996	Whomsoever Proud	6	Brian Bochinski	Ronald G. Burke	Bruno Schickedanz	1 3/4 miles	3:00.00
1995	Stellarina	4	Todd Kabel	Daniel J. Vella	Frank Stronach	1 3/4 miles	2:55.80
1994	Major Pots	5	Dino Luciani	Lou Cavalaris, Jr.	Gardiner Farms	1 3/4 miles	2:52.60
1993	All Canadian	4	Robert Landry	Robert P. Tiller	Frank Stronach	1 3/4 miles	3:00.80
1992	Stage Actor	4	Todd Kabel	Ross Armata	Sais Singh	1 3/4 miles	2:55.40
1991	Cozzene's Prince	4	Robin Platts	Tino Attard	Kirby Canada Farm	1 3/4 miles	2:55.00
1990	Most Valiant	4	Brian Swatuk	James E. Day	Sam-Son Farm	1 3/4 miles	2:57.00
1989	Take Account	3	Don Seymour	Roger Attfield	Kinghaven Farms	1 3/4 miles	2:56.40
1988	Steady Power	4	Don Seymour	Roger Attfield	Kinghaven Farms	1 3/4 miles	3:02.60
1987	Bodmin Moor	3	Don Seymour	Roger Attfield	Kinghaven Farms	1 3/4 miles	3:02.20
1986	Royal Treasurer	3	Don Seymour	James E. Day	Sam-Son Farm	1 3/4 miles	3:02.80
1985	Old Gun Powder	3	Lloyd Duffy	Jerry G. Lavigne	Paddockhurst Stable	1 3/4 miles	3:09.00
1984	Roman Strategy	3	Irwin Driedger	Duke Campbell	D. Mann	1 3/4 miles	3:04.60
1983	Creigneish	4	Richard Dos Ramos	Martin Velden	Hamilton & S. G. S. Stable	1 3/4 miles	2:59.80
1982	Turnablade	5	George HoSang	Emile M. Allain	John Sikura, Jr.	1 3/4 miles	2:57.60
1981	Jadosa Toker	4	Gary Stahlbaum	L. Nacht	Knightsbridge et al.	1 3/4 miles	3:03.80
1980	Knight's Turn	5	John Bell	Emile M. Allain	Mrs. C. Tefloth	1 3/4 miles	2:57.40
1979	Knight's Turn	4	John Bell	Emile M. Allain	Mrs. C. Tefloth	1 3/4 miles	3:00.80
1978	Party Surprise	3	Lloyd Duffy	Peter DiPasquale	Berketa/Buchanan	1 3/4 miles	3:02.80
1977	Gore Park	5	B. Smythe	Jerry G. Lavigne	Parkview Stable	1 3/4 miles	3:02.00
1976	Double Quill	7	Lloyd Duffy	Lou Cavalaris, Jr.	Gardiner Farms	1 3/4 miles	3:03.00
1975	George of Canada	6	Hugo Dittfach	W. H. Moorhead	S. V. Lima & M. Rose	1 3/4 miles	3:07.20
1974	Carney's Point	5	Robin Platts	Lou Cavalaris, Jr.	Gardiner Farms	1 3/4 miles	2:55.40
1973	Fabe Count	5	Sandy Hawley	Jerry G. Lavigne	Parkview Stable	1 3/4 miles	3:01.80
1972	Monte Christo	5	Sandy Hawley	Jerry G. Lavigne	Gardiner Farms	1 3/4 miles	2:54.40
1971	Cool Moon	3	Sandy Hawley	Frank Merrill, Jr.	W. P. Gilbride	1 3/4 miles	2:59.20
1970	Frenetico	6	C. Billingsley	Lou Cavalaris, Jr.	Gardiner Farms	1 3/4 miles	3:02.60
1969	Mr. Amber	3	R. Pion	Samuel Dixon	P. M. P. Stable	1 3/4 miles	3:00.00
1968	Caesar B. Good	5	Richard Armstrong	B. Puccini	E. C. Pasquale	1 3/4 miles	3:02.60
1967	Caesar B. Good	4	Hugo Dittfach	B. Puccini	E. C. Pasquale	1 3/4 miles	3:09.20
1966	He's A Smoothie	3	Hugo Dittfach	Warren Beasley	William R. Beasley	1 3/4 miles	3:00.60
1965	Albion Star	5	M. Ferro	Carl F. Chapman	D. Knight	1 3/4 miles	3:12.80
1964	Latin Artist	4	G. Gordon	Lou Cavalaris, Jr.	Gardiner Farms	1 3/4 miles	3:04.20
1963	Whiteborough	6	Richard Armstrong	W. F. Edmiston	C. Softley	1 3/4 miles	3:09.00
1962	Whiteborough	5	Richard Armstrong	W. H. Moorhead	C. Softley	1 3/4 miles	2:58.80
1961	Ramsay	3	Sam McComb	Edward "Ted" Mann	George R. Gardiner	1 3/4 miles	3:00.60
1960	Calais	5	James Fitzsimmons	Arthur H. Warner	Lanson Farm	1 3/4 miles	2:57.20
1959	Calais	4	Hugo Dittfach	Arthur H. Warner	Lanson Farm	1 3/4 miles	2:59.40
1958	Bernfield	5	Sam Cosentino	Frank Merrill, Jr.	Roxie Gian	1 3/4 miles	3:03.40
1957	Bernfield	4	Norm Leid	J. Hunter	Roxie Gian	1 3/4 miles	3:05.20
1956	Dark Armor	3	Juan Sanchez	Horatio Luro	Horatio Luro	1 3/4 miles	2:57.00
1955	Captor	3	L. Richards	Gordon J. McCann	E. P. Taylor	1 3/8 miles	2:26.60
1954	Teddy's Sister	6	F. Higgins	R. Buisson	J. J. Fleming	1 3/8 miles	2:25.20
1953	Race Not Ran						
1952	Try On	3	Alf Bavington	John Passero	William R. Beasley	1 5/8 miles	2:57.80

== Other North American Marathon races ==
On dirt:

- Brooklyn Handicap
- Fort Harrod Stakes
- Gallant Man Handicap
- Tokyo City Cup
- Las Vegas Marathon Stakes (formerly the Breeders' Cup Marathon)

On turf:

- San Juan Capistrano Invitational Handicap
- Carleton F. Burke Handicap
- Kentucky Cup Turf Stakes

== See also ==
- List of Canadian flat horse races
