= James E. Ryan (horse trainer) =

British jockey and American trainer (1900–1976)

Personal information
- Born: August 30, 1900 Ireland
- Died: July 26, 1976 (aged 75) Unionville, Chester County, Pennsylvania, United States
- Occupation: Trainer

Horse racing career
- Sport: Horse racing
- Career wins: Not found

Major racing wins
- Steeplechase: New York Turf Writers Cup Handicap (1939, 1942, 1946, 1952); Charles L. Appleton Memorial Steeplechase (1949); Temple Gwathmey Steeplechase (1952); Meadow Brook Steeplechase (1952); North American Steeplechase (1953) Flat racing: Fall Highweight Handicap (1949); Interborough Handicap (1949); Grey Lag Handicap (1949); Questionnaire Handicap (1949); Widener Handicap (1950); Dixie Handicap (1951, 1953); Gallant Fox Handicap (1951, 1953); Manhattan Handicap (1951); Merchants and Citizens Handicap (1951); Queens County Handicap (1952); Hialeah Turf Cup Handicap (1953); Massachusetts Handicap (1953); Sussex Turf Handicap (1953); New York Handicap (1958)

Significant horses
- County Delight, Royal Vale, Royal Governor, The Mast

James E. Ryan (August 30, 1900 – July 26, 1976) was an American Thoroughbred horse racing trainer in both steeplechase and flat racing. A native of Ireland, his father, Owen J. Ryan, was the master of Cleaboy Stud in Mullingar, County Westmeath, Ireland. While working in a factory in England in his early teens, Jim Ryan began riding steeplechase horses on weekends. He eventually made it a career and after moving to the United States in the 1930s, became a trainer and breeder.

During his career, Ryan conditioned horses for notable stable owners such as Mrs. F. Ambrose Clark, James Cox Brady Jr., Paul Mellon and Richard King Mellon, and Esther du Pont Thouron for whom he conditioned Royal Governor, the 1949 American Co-Champion Sprint Horse.

Ryan was also widely respected for his knowledge of horse anatomy. A 1967 Sports Illustrated article reported that the Tattersalls horse auction company said that Ryan was the "second-best judge of horseflesh in their 200-year history."

Jim Ryan made his home near Unionville, Chester County, Pennsylvania and that was where he died from a heart attack in 1976.
