= Fort Harrod Stakes =

American horse race

The $100,000 Fort Harrod Stakes was an American Thoroughbred horse race run annually in mid April at Keeneland Race Course in Lexington, Kentucky. A Listed Race open to horses age four and older, the race was contested on Polytrack synthetic dirt and was the longest stakes race run at Keeneland, at 13 furlongs (1 5/8 mi or 2.6 km). It offered a purse of $100,000 and was one of the races leading up to the Breeders' Cup Marathon.

In 2010, Keeneland did not renew the Fort Harrod Stakes.

== Winners ==
Year	Winner	Age	Jockey	Trainer	Owner	Time
2009	Gangbuster	4	Kent Desormeaux	J. Keith Desormeaux	Allshouse Racing LLC	2:44.02
2008	Jade's Revenge	5	Edgar Prado	H. Graham Motion	Brushwood Stable	2:42.69

=== Other North American Marathon races ===
On dirt

- Brooklyn Handicap
- Gallant Man Handicap
- Tokyo City Cup
- Valedictory Stakes

On turf

- Canadian International Stakes
- San Juan Capistrano Invitational Handicap
