= Gallant Man Handicap =

Discontinued American Thoroughbred horse race

The Gallant Man Handicap is a discontinued American Thoroughbred horse race first run on June 1, 2008 at Hollywood Park Racetrack in Inglewood, California. Open to horses age three and older, it was contested on Cushion Track synthetic dirt at a distance of 13 furlongs (1 5/8 mi; 2.6 km).

The race was named in honor of United States Racing Hall of Fame inductee, Gallant Man.

== Winners ==
Year	Winner	Age	Jockey	Trainer	Owner	Dist. (Miles)	Time	Win$
2009	Kizzy's Chaos	4	Martin Garcia	Vladimir Cerin	Robert A. Alexander	15/8	2:43.48	$60,000
2008	Big Booster	7	Rafael Bejarano	Michael R. Mitchell	S. & W. Anastasi/J. Ukegawa	15/8	2:44.48	$62,949

=== Other North American Marathon races ===
On dirt:

- Fort Harrod Stakes
- Valedictory Stakes

On turf:

- San Juan Capistrano Invitational Handicap
