= Grey Classic =

Canadian-bred Thoroughbred racehorse

- Sire: Grey Dawn
- Grandsire: Herbager
- Dam: No Class
- Damsire: Nodouble
- Sex: Stallion
- Foaled: 1983
- Country: Canada
- Colour: Gray
- Breeder: Sam-Son Farm
- Owner: Sam-Son Farm
- Trainer: James E. Day
- Record: 28: 7-0-6
- Earnings: $602,039

Major wins
- Summer Stakes (1985); Cup and Saucer Stakes (1985); Coronation Futurity Stakes (1985); Connaught Cup Stakes (1988); Laurel Turf Cup Handicap (1988)

Awards
- Canadian Champion Two-Year-Old Colt (1985)

Grey Classic (1983–1989) was a Canadian Thoroughbred Champion racehorse.

== Background ==
Bred and raced by Ernie L. Samuel's Sam-Son Farm of Milton, Ontario, Grey Classic was conditioned for racing by Olympic equestrian gold medalist and Canadian Horse Racing Hall of Fame inductee Jim Day.

== Racing career ==
Ridden by Irwin Driedger as a two-year-old in 1985, Grey Classic won four of seven starts, including the Summer Stakes, and then the two top races for Canadian juveniles, the Cup and Saucer Stakes on turf and the Coronation Futurity Stakes on dirt. His performances earned him Canadian Champion Two-Year-Old Colt honors for 1985.

At age three, Grey Classic suffered with condition problems and did not race until July 13, 1986, when he ran eighth as one of the favorites in the Queen's Plate, Canada's most prestigious race and first leg of the Canadian Triple Crown of Thoroughbred Racing. Minor injuries kept the colt out of the next two legs of the Triple Crown, and a series of ailments meant that he did not win an important race again until age five. On June 5, 1988, he won the Connaught Cup Stakes at Woodbine Racetrack; then, in November, in his last race, he won the mile and a half Laurel Turf Cup Handicap at Maryland's Laurel Park Racecourse.

Two months later, the January 10, 1989, edition of the Toronto Star reported that Grey Classic had dropped dead at the Sam-Son Farm in Florida.
