= Marlboro Cup Invitational Handicap =

- Class: Discontinued Grade 1
- Location: Belmont Park; Elmont, New York, United States
- Race type: Thoroughbred – Flat racing

Race information
- Distance: 1 1/8 miles (9 furlongs)
- Surface: Dirt
- Track: left-handed
- Qualification: Three-years-old & up
- Weight: Assigned

The Marlboro Cup Invitational Handicap was a Thoroughbred horse race first run in September 1973 at Belmont Park in Elmont, New York. A Grade 1 race for horses 3 years old and up, it was raced over a distance of 1 1/8 miles on a dirt track.

The race came into existence as a result of the huge popularity of Secretariat, who in 1973 became the first U.S. Triple Crown champion in twenty-five years. Such was the drawing power of Secretariat that CBS television readily agreed to broadcast the race nationally, a rare occurrence at the time for a non-Triple Crown or traditional "classic" event (such as the Travers Stakes). Originally conceived as a match race with Secretariat's stablemate and 1972 Kentucky Derby winner Riva Ridge, it was changed to an invitational race that brought together the top horses 3 years of age and older.

In the inaugural race, Secretariat set a world record time for 1 1/8 miles on dirt while winning by 3 1/2 lengths on a track officially rated as being only "good". The race became a very important annual event and 1978 marked the first of only two times in racing history that two American Triple Crown winners met in a single race, with Seattle Slew, the 1977 champion, defeating the 1978 champion Affirmed by three lengths. (The two met again in that year's edition of the Jockey Club Gold Cup; Seattle Slew lost by a nose to Exceller, while Affirmed finished up the track due to a slipped saddle.)

For many years the Marlboro Cup was part of Belmont Park's Fall Championship meet and the track's owner, the New York Racing Association, created a Fall Championship Series consisting of the Woodward Stakes, followed by the Marlboro Cup, and then the Jockey Club Gold Cup. In 1984, Slew o' Gold became the first horse to win the Fall Series for which he received a $1,000,000 bonus. CBS and later NBC continued to broadcast the Marlboro into the 1980s.

The advent of the Breeders' Cup races in 1984 marked the beginning of the end for the Marlboro Cup. In 1987, the 15th edition of the race attracted just five horses and was picked up for broadcast on cable television only.

== Records ==
Speed record:

- 1:45.40 @ 1-1/8 miles: Secretariat (1973) (new stakes, track, and world record)
- 2:00.00 @ 1 1/4 miles: Turkoman (1986)

Most wins:

- No horse won this race more than once.

Most wins by a jockey:

- 3 – Jacinto Vásquez (1977, 1982, 1983)

Most wins by a trainer:

- 2 – MacKenzie Miller (1980, 1987)

Most wins by an owner:

- 2 – Rokeby Stables (1980, 1987)

== Winners ==
Year	Winner	Age	Jockey	Trainer	Owner	Dist. (Miles)	Time	Win$	Gr.
1987	Java Gold	3	Pat Day	MacKenzie Miller	Rokeby Stables	1-1/4 m	2:01.00	$450,000	G1
1986	Turkoman	4	Gary Stevens	Gary F. Jones	Saron Stable	1-1/4 m	2:00.00	$300,000	G1
1985	Chief's Crown	3	Don MacBeth	Roger Laurin	Star Crown Stable (Estate of Carl Rosen)	1-1/4 m	2:01.20	$300,000	G1
1984	Slew o' Gold	4	Angel Cordero Jr.	John O. Hertler	Equusequity Stable (Jim & Sally Hill, Mickey & Karen Taylor)	1-1/4 m	2:02.40	$240,000	G1
1983	Highland Blade	5	Jacinto Vasquez	David A. Whiteley	Pen-Y-Bryn Farm	1-1/4 m	2:01.20	$240,000	G1
1982	Lemhi Gold	4	Jacinto Vasquez	Laz Barrera	Aaron U. Jones	1-1/4 m	2:01.00	$240,000	G1
1981	Noble Nashua	3	Ruben Hernandez	Jose A. Martin	Flying Zee Stable (Carl Lizza Jr. & Herbert Hochreiter)	1-1/4 m	2:00.60	$240,000	G1
1980	Winter's Tale	4	Jeffrey Fell	MacKenzie Miller	Rokeby Stables	1-1/8 m	1:47.00	$180,000	G1
1979	Spectacular Bid	3	Bill Shoemaker	Bud Delp	Hawksworth Farm (Harry & Teresa Meyerhoff)	1-1/8 m	1:46.60	$180,000	G1
1978	Seattle Slew	4	Angel Cordero Jr.	Douglas R. Peterson	Karen & Mickey Taylor	1-1/8 m	1:45.80	$180,000	G1
1977	Proud Birdie	4	Jacinto Vasquez	James W. Maloney	Marablue Farm (A. Douglas Henderson)	1-1/4 m	2:00.80	$167,760	G1
1976	Forego	6	Bill Shoemaker	Frank Y. Whiteley Jr.	Lazy F Ranch	1-1/4 m	2:00.00	$170,220	G1
1975	Wajima	3	Braulio Baeza	Stephen A. DiMauro	East-West Stable (Zenya Yoshida, James A. Scully, Harold I. Snyder, James Welch)	1-1/4 m	2:00.00	$150,000	G1
1974	Big Spruce	5	Michael Hole	Victor J. Nickerson	Elmendorf Farm	1-1/8 m	1:46.60	$150,000	
1973	Secretariat	3	Ron Turcotte	Lucien Laurin	Meadow Stable	1-1/8 m	1:45.40	$150,000	
