= Maxwell Henry Gluck =

American diplomat and businessman

- Born: November 4, 1899; Commerce, Texas, US
- Died: November 23, 1984 (aged 85); Los Angeles, California, US
- Occupation: Diplomat
- Spouse: Muriel (Schlesinger) Gluck

Maxwell Henry Gluck (November 4, 1899 – November 23, 1984) was an American businessman, diplomat, thoroughbred horse breeder and philanthropist. He served as the United States Ambassador to Ceylon from September 19, 1957, to October 2, 1958.

== Biography ==
=== Early life ===
Maxwell Henry Gluck was born on November 4, 1899, in Commerce, Texas. He grew up in Sharon, Pennsylvania, where his parents owned a small store. He had two brothers, Morris and George and two sisters Lena (Speizer) and Jennifer (Mahado).

=== Career ===
In 1929, he opened a women's store in New York City. It later became a chain known as the Darling Stores Corporation, with 150 stores in 27 states. Gluck served as its chairman. In 1960, the Darling Stores Corporation merged with Grayson-Robinson Stores, which he purchased. Later, he served as Chairman of the A. S. Beck Shoe Corporation and Willoughby's Peerless Camera Stores.

=== Diplomacy ===
He was appointed by President Dwight Eisenhower to serve as the United States Ambassador to Sri Lanka from September 19, 1957, to October 2, 1958.

=== Equestrianism ===
In 1952, he purchased Elmendorf Farm in Lexington, Kentucky, where he bred thoroughbreds. In 1973, Gluck's colt Protagonist was voted American Champion Two-Year-Old Male Horse and his filly Talking Picture earned American Champion Two-Year-Old Female Horse honors. Both were trained by John Campo. Other top horses owned and raced by Max Gluck included Big Spruce, Play the Red, Prince John, Speak John, and Super Moment.

He was the 1973 recipient of the P. A. B. Widener Award as a top breeder of Kentucky-bred horses, and the 1977 recipient of the Eclipse Award for Outstanding Owner.

In 1983, Maxwell Gluck donated US$3 million to the University of Kentucky for the establishment of an equine research center.

=== Personal life ===
He married Muriel (Schlesinger) Gluck in 1948. They resided in Lexington and in Los Angeles, California. He was a large donor to the Republican Party and art collector.

=== Death ===
He died of heart failure on November 23, 1984, at the Ronald Reagan UCLA Medical Center in Los Angeles.
