= Leading broodmare sire in North America =

The list below shows the leading Thoroughbred sire of broodmares in North America for each year since 1924. This is determined by the amount of prize money won during the year by racehorses which were foaled by a daughter of the sire. The most frequent sires on the list are Sir Gallahad III (12), Mr. Prospector (9), Princequillo (8), and Star Shoot (5).

- 1924 – Star Shoot (1)
- 1925 – Star Shoot (2)
- 1926 – Star Shoot (3)
- 1927 –
- 1928 – Star Shoot (4)
- 1929 – Star Shoot (5)
- 1930 – Celt (1)
- 1931 – Fair Play (1)
- 1932 – Broomstick (1)
- 1933 – Broomstick (2)
- 1934 – Fair Play (2)
- 1935 – Wrack (1)
- 1936 – High Time (1)
- 1937 – Sweep (1)
- 1938 – Fair Play (3)
- 1939 – Sir Gallahad III (1)
- 1940 – High Time (2)
- 1941 – Sweep (1)
- 1942 – Chicle (1)
- 1943 – Sir Gallahad III (2)
- 1944 – Sir Gallahad III (3)
- 1945 – Sir Gallahad III (4)
- 1946 – Sir Gallahad III (5)
- 1947 – Sir Gallahad III (6)
- 1948 – Sir Gallahad III (7)
- 1949 – Sir Gallahad III (8)
- 1950 – Sir Gallahad III (9)
- 1951 – Sir Gallahad III (10)
- 1952 – Sir Gallahad III (11)
- 1953 – Bull Dog (1)
- 1954 – Bull Dog (2)
- 1955 – Sir Gallahad III (12)
- 1956 – Bull Dog (3)
- 1957 – Mahmoud (1)
- 1958 – Bull Lea (2)
- 1959 – Bull Lea (3)
- 1960 – Bull Lea (4)
- 1961 – Bull Lea (5)
- 1962 – War Admiral (1)
- 1963 – Count Fleet (1)
- 1964 – War Admiral (2)
- 1965 – Roman (1)
- 1966 – Princequillo (1)
- 1967 – Princequillo (2)
- 1968 – Princequillo (3)
- 1969 – Princequillo (4)
- 1970 – Princequillo (5)
- 1971 – Double Jay (1)
- 1972 – Princequillo (6)
- 1973 – Princequillo (7)
- 1974 – Olympia (1)
- 1975 – Double Jay (2)
- 1976 – Princequillo (8)
- 1977 – Double Jay (3)
- 1978 – Crafty Admiral (1)
- 1979 – Prince John (1)
- 1980 – Prince John (2)
- 1981 – Double Jay (4)
- 1982 – Prince John (3)
- 1983 – Buckpasser (1)
- 1984 – Buckpasser (2)
- 1985 – Speak John (1)
- 1986 – Prince John (4)
- 1987 – Hoist The Flag (1)
- 1988 – Buckpasser (3)
- 1989 – Buckpasser (4)
- 1990 – Grey Dawn II (1)
- 1991 – Northern Dancer (1)
- 1992 – Secretariat (1)
- 1993 – Nijinsky (1)
- 1994 – Nijinsky (2)
- 1995 – Seattle Slew (1)
- 1996 – Seattle Slew (2)
- 1997 – Mr. Prospector (1)
- 1998 – Mr. Prospector (2)
- 1999 – Mr. Prospector (3)
- 2000 – Mr. Prospector (4)
- 2001 – Mr. Prospector (5)
- 2002 – Mr. Prospector (6)
- 2003 – Mr. Prospector (7)
- 2004 – Dixieland Band (1)
- 2005 – Mr. Prospector (8)
- 2006 – Mr. Prospector (9)
- 2007 – Deputy Minister (1)
- 2008 – Sadler's Wells (1)
- 2009 – Sadler's Wells (2)
- 2010 – Sadler's Wells (3)
- 2011 – Danehill (1)
- 2012 – Storm Cat (1)
- 2013 – Storm Cat (2)
- 2014 – Storm Cat (3)
- 2015 – A.P. Indy (1)
- 2016 – Sunday Silence (1)
- 2017 – Distorted Humor (1)
- 2018 – Giant's Causeway (1)
- 2019 – Sunday Silence (2)
- 2020 – King Kamehameha
- 2021 – A.P. Indy (2)
- 2022 – Bernardini
- 2023 – King Kamehameha (2)
- 2024 - King Kamehameha (3)

== See also ==
- Leading sire in Australia
- Leading sire in France
- Leading sire in Germany
- Leading sire in Great Britain & Ireland
- Leading sire in Japan
- Leading broodmare sire in Japan
- Leading sire in North America
- Leading broodmare sire in Great Britain & Ireland
