= Red Rum Handicap Chase =

Steeplechase horse race in Britain

- Class: Grade 3
- Location: Aintree Racecourse; Merseyside, England
- Race type: Steeplechase
- Sponsor: Close Brothers Group
- Website: Aintree

Race information
- Distance: 1m 7f 176y (3,178 metres)
- Surface: Turf
- Track: Left-handed
- Qualification: Five-years-old and up
- Weight: Handicap
- Purse: £100,000 (2022); 1st: £56,270

Red Rum Handicap Chase
2026
Ryan's Rocket	Highlands Legacy	Sans Bruit

Previous years
2025
Sans Bruit	Calico	Inedit Star
2024
Sans Bruit	Saint Roi	Path D'oroux
2023
Dancing On My Own	Douglas Talking	The Last Day
2022
The Last Day	Dancing On My Own	Shakem Up'arry
2021
Editeur Du Gite	Sully D'Oc Aa	Dostal Phil

2020-2011
2019
Moon Over Germany	Lady Buttons	Champagne At Tara
2018
Bentelimar	Theinval	Gino Trail
2017
Double W's	Theinval	Bun Doran
2016
Katachenko	Dandridge	Viconte Du Noyer
2015
Surf And Turf	Darwins Fox	Pearls Legend
2014
Parsnip Pete	Turn Over Sivola	Claret Cloak
2013
Oiseau de Nuit	Tanks For That	Kie
2012
Edgardo Sol	Astracad	Echo Bob
2011
Silk Drum	Oiseau de Nuit	I'm Delilah

2010-2001
2010
Chaninbar	Doctor David	Oiseau de Nuit
2009
Oh Crick	Lord Jay Jay	Tramantano
2008
Stan	Dev	Lord Henry
2007
Bambi De L'orme	Marshall Hall	Locksmith
2006
Jacks Craic	Nyrche	Andreas
2005
Fota Island	Kadount	Bambi De L'orme
2004
Tidour	Armaturk	St Pirran
2003
Golden Alpha	Dark'n Sharp	Risk Accessor
2002
Dark'n Sharp	Lord York	Glenelly Gale
2001
Aghawadda Gold	Wahiba Sands	Ichi Beau

2000-1991
2000
Jungli	Samakaan	Clifton Beat
1999
Flying Instructor	Green Green Desert	Celibate
1998
Jeffell	Flying Instructor	Lake Kariba
1997
Down The Fell	Lord Dorcet	Wee River
1996
Arctic Kinsman	Time Won't Wait	Uncle Ernie
1995
Coulton	Clay County	Oh So Grumpy
1994
Uncle Ernie	Viking Flagship	My Young Man
1993
Boutzdaroff	Fragrant Dawn	Young Pokey
1992
Katabatic	Master Rajh	Redundant Pal
1991
Blitzkreig	Redundant Pal	Nos Na Gaoithe

1990-1988
1990
Nohalmdun	Prize Asset	Katabatic
1989
Feroda	Prize Asset	Meikleour
1988
Prideaux Boy	Paddyboro	Bobsline

The Red Rum Handicap Chase is a Grade 3 National Hunt steeplechase in Great Britain which is open to horses aged five years or older. It is run on the Mildmay course at Aintree over a distance of about 2 miles (1 mile, 7 furlongs and 176 yards, or 3,178 metres), and during its running there are twelve fences to be jumped. It is a handicap race, and it is scheduled to take place each year in early April.

The event is named in memory of Red Rum, a three-time winner of the Grand National in the 1970s. It was formerly known as the Aintree Chase, and it was retitled the Red Rum Chase in 1997.

The race used to be contested as a limited handicap (a race where a restricted weight range is specified), and it was given Grade 2 status in 1991. It became a standard handicap in 2001, and since then it has been called the Red Rum Handicap Chase. This version was initially classed at Listed level, and it was promoted to Grade 3 status in 2004.

== Winners since 1976 ==
- Weights given in stones and pounds.

Year	Winner	Age	Weight	Jockey	Trainer
1976	Menehall	9	10-00	Mark Floyd	Fulke Walwyn
1977	Skymas	12	12-00	Mouse Morris	Brian Lusk
1978	Even Melody	9	11-06	Colin Hawkins	Neville Crump
1979	Funny Baby	8	10-07	Ridley Lamb	George Fairbairn
1980	Drumgora	8	10-07	Tommy McGivern	Arthur Moore
1981	Western Rose	9	10-07	Sam Morshead	Fred Rimell
1982	Little Bay	7	10-07	Jonjo O'Neill	Gordon W. Richards
1983	Artifice	12	11-00	Peter Scudamore	John Thorne
1984	Little Bay	9	11-07	John Francome	Gordon W. Richards
1985	Kathies Lad	8	11-07	Steve Smith Eccles	Alan Jarvis
1986	Kathies Lad	9	10–13	Steve Smith Eccles	Alan Jarvis
1987	Sea Merchant	10	10-07	Ridley Lamb	Arthur Stephenson
1988	Prideaux Boy	10	10-07	Allen Webb	Graham Roach
1989	Feroda	8	10-07	Tom Taaffe	Arthur Moore
1990	Nohalmdun	9	10-07	Lorcan Wyer	Peter Easterby
1991	Blitzkreig	8	10–13	Tommy Carmody	Edward O'Grady
1992	Katabatic	9	12-00	Simon McNeill	Andrew Turnell
1993	Boutzdaroff	11	10-07	Mark Dwyer	Jimmy FitzGerald
1994	Uncle Ernie	9	10-08	Mark Dwyer	Jimmy FitzGerald
1995	Coulton	8	11-08	Jamie Osborne	Oliver Sherwood
1996	Arctic Kinsman	8	11-00	Carl Llewellyn	Nigel Twiston-Davies
1997	Down the Fell	8	10–07	Norman Williamson	Howard Johnson
1998	Jeffell	8	12-00	Conor O'Dwyer	Arthur Moore
1999	Flying Instructor	9	11-05	Jimmy McCarthy	Paul Webber
2000	Jungli	7	10-07	Jimmy McCarthy	Paul Webber
2001	Aghawadda Gold	9	11-02	Russ Garritty	Tom Tate
2002	Dark'n Sharp	7	10-08	Richard Johnson	Richard Phillips
2003	Golden Alpha	9	10–13	Tony McCoy	Martin Pipe
2004	Tidour	8	10–11	Tom Doyle	Paul Webber
2005	Fota Island	9	11-10	Tony McCoy	Mouse Morris
2006	Jacks Craic	7	10-02	Tony Evans	John Spearing
2007	Bambi de l'Orme	8	10-02	Dominic Elsworth	Ian Williams
2008	Stan	9	09-09	Aidan Coleman	Venetia Williams
2009	Oh Crick	6	11-01	Robert Thornton	Alan King
2010	Chaninbar	7	10-08	Sean Quinlan	Milton Harris
2011	Silk Drum	6	09-09	Paul Gallagher	Howard Johnson
2012	Edgardo Sol	5	11-00	Ruby Walsh	Paul Nicholls
2013	Oiseau de Nuit	11	11-08	Brendan Powell	Colin Tizzard
2014	Parsnip Pete	8	10-10	Paddy Brennan	Tom George
2015	Surf And Turf	9	10-05	Brian Hughes	Kevin Frost
2016	Katachenko	7	10-10	Wayne Hutchinson	Donald McCain
2017	Double W's	7	11-01	Brian Hughes	Malcolm Jefferson
2018	Bentelimar	9	10-08	Jonathan Burke	Charlie Longsdon
2019	Moon Over Germany	8	10-07	Rachael Blackmore	Henry de Bromhead
	no race 2020 (Note: The 2020 running was cancelled because of the COVID-19 pandemic in the United Kingdom)
2021	Editeur Du Gite	7	10-09	Joshua Moore	Gary Moore
2022	The Last Day	10	10-06	Adam Wedge	Evan Williams
2023	Dancing On My Own	9	11-10	Rachael Blackmore	Henry De Bromhead
2024	Sans Bruit	6	10-02	Bryony Frost	Paul Nicholls
2025	Sans Bruit	7	10-06	Harry Cobden	Paul Nicholls
2026	Ryan's Rocket	8	11-00	Jonathan Burke	Fergal O'Brien

== See also ==
- Horse racing in Great Britain
- List of British National Hunt races
