= Elmendorf Farm =

Thoroughbred horse farm in Kentucky

Coordinates: 38.114469°N 84.408576°W

- Type: Horse breeding stud farm
- Industry: Thoroughbred horse racing
- Founded: 1874
- Headquarters: 3931 Paris Pike; Lexington, Kentucky
- Key people: Milton H. Sanford (founding owner); Daniel Swigert; James Ben Ali Haggin; The Widener Family; Maxwell Henry Gluck; Jack Kent Cooke; Dinwiddie Lampton
- Website: www.stonecolumnsstables.com

Elmendorf Farm is a Kentucky Thoroughbred horse farm in Fayette County, Kentucky, involved with horse racing since the 19th century. Once the North Elkhorn Farm, many owners and tenants have occupied the area, even during the American Civil War. Most of the land acquired during Haggin's era has since been sold off to neighboring stud farms, but the original 765 acres including the columns and many of the historic barns and houses still exist at Elmendorf.

== History ==
In about 1806, Robert Carter Harrison (1765–1840) brought his wife Ann Cabell Harrison (1771–1840) and their many children from their home in Clifton, Virginia, to Fayette County, Kentucky. There he bought the Old Kenney Farm, also known as Elk Hill, and later built his home, which came to be known as "Clifton". Elizabeth M. Simpson's book (See Ref) says the frame colonial style house was built prior to 1830; while Joe Jordon's book (See Ref) says it was built between 1835 and 1840.

Robert's son, Carter (1796–1825) died before his father, so in 1840 "Clifton" passed to Robert's grandson Carter Harrison III (1825–1893), jointly with the child's mother Caroline Evaline (Russell) Carter (1797–1875). Caroline was the daughter of Colonel William Russell. Carter Harrison III sold "Clifton" in 1855 after his mother, Caroline, was remarried to Reverend Thomas Parker Dudley of Lexington, brother of noted surgeon Benjamin Winslow Dudley. Carter moved to Chicago where he served four consecutive terms as mayor (1879–1887) and was elected to a fifth nonconsecutive term in 1893.

On October 30, 1893, Harrison III was assassinated in his own home. The Maysville, Kentucky Evening Bulletin headline said he was "Shot by a Crank". Harrison died and was buried in Graceland Cemetery in Chicago. His son Carter Harrison IV (1860–1953) was elected mayor of Chicago 4 years after his father's murder, and served 5 terms.

In 1855, Thomas Hughes (1789–1862), son of Cornelius Hughes, bought the 374-acre (1.51 km^{2}) farm from Carter Henry Harrison. He lived there with his wife Julia Ann Smith Hughes (1805–1846) and their four children, including daughter Kate Hughes McCreary (1844–1908), wife of Governor James B. McCreary (1838–1918) and son William Thomas Hughes (see next). Thomas and Julia Smith Hughes were buried on the Hughes farm, along with Thomas's brother, Michael Hughes, and his wife Mary Adams Hughes, and several children of one or the other couple. All of these family members were later re-interred in the Lexington Cemetery in a lot owned by Kate Hughes McCreary and Michael's son John T Hughes, noted Lexington horseman.

In 1862 William Thomas "WT" Hughes (1832–1874) inherited the farm from his father, Thomas Hughes, and lived there with his wife Sallie Kirkpatrick (Cooper) Hughes and their four children for over a decade. A large oil painting of their son Cooper Hughes (1862–1928) as a small boy, shows the original "Clifton" home in the background.

After the Civil War, Hughes began to buy more land, paying $100–$150 per acre at high interest rates, and not only breeding cattle but speculating in cattle in the New York market. WT borrowed heavily, and his loans were cosigned by his maternal uncle Granville Smith. In 1874, Hughes was forced to sell the farm to repay his creditors. In March 1874 Hughes sold 544 acres (2.20 km^{2}) of the Hughes farm to Milton H. Sanford.

In June 1874, WT Hughes and his wife were relocating to a smaller farm in a nearby county, riding alongside the Kentucky River in their buggy, with pack wagons full of chattel and children following behind, when William was shot and killed from the cliff top by his uncle Granville Smith. Later that day Smith (1807–1874) shot himself. Both men left widows and children. Smith was buried in the Lexington Cemetery, and Hughes was buried first in the Richmond Cemetery, and later reinterred in Lexington alongside his wife Sallie. In 1875, the Hughes heirs sold another 776 acres (3.14 km^{2}) to Richard Penniston.

== Elmendorf Farm ==
=== Milton H. Sanford ===
In 1874, Milton H. Sanford purchased 544 acres (2.20 km^{2}) of the Hughes farm. Sanford had previously had a farm in New Jersey, named for the town of Preakness, New Jersey, after which he also named his horse Preakness — the same horse for whom the Preakness Stakes is named. After moving to Kentucky, Sanford continued to use the same name. The stallion Virgil was based at Preakness Stud and sired three Kentucky Derby winners: Vagrant (1876), Hindoo (1881) and Ben Ali (1886).

=== Daniel Swigert ===
In 1881, Sanford sold the land as well as his bloodstock (including Virgil and other leading sire Glenelg) to Daniel Swigert, who had been the manager of the Woodburn Stud as well as a "pinhooker", one who buys horses and quickly sells them. Swigert renamed the farm Elmendorf for his wife's grandmother, Blandina Elmendorf Brodhead. For years Swigert ran Elmendorf, breeding many exceptional horses. He also purchased and later sold the champion Spendthrift, which he had named after his wife's spending habits. A while later, his wife responded by naming Spendthrift's younger brother, Miser.

Before acquiring Elmendorf, Swigert had owned and then sold the 1870 Belmont Stakes winner Kingfisher, the 1873 Belmont Stakes winner Springbok and the 1877 Kentucky Derby winner Baden-Baden. He also bred the great Hindoo. While in charge of Elmendorf, Swigert bred Salvator, Firenze, and the Kentucky Derby winners Ben Ali and Apollo. Swigert sold Elmendorf in October 1891 to Con J. Enright.

=== Cornelius J. Enright ===
Cornelius "Con" Enright purchased Elmendorf in 1891. During his ownership he imported several good breeding mares from Europe. Enright most notably bred U.S. Racing Hall of Fame inductee, Hamburg and, in partnership with W. B. Jennings, the Canadian Horse Racing Hall of Fame inductee, Martimas who won the prestigious Futurity Stakes in 1898. He sold the farm to James Ben Ali Haggin at an October 22, 1897, auction held at Morris Park Racecourse in Morris Park, New York.

=== James Ben Ali Haggin ===
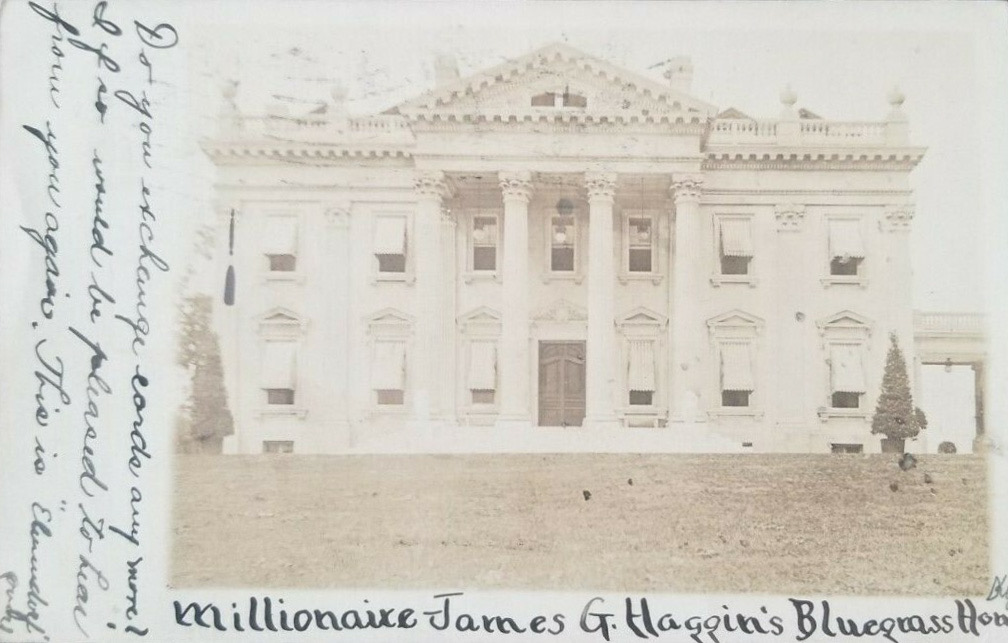
Elmendorf Farm (1907)

James Ben Ali Haggin, who already had had much success with Thoroughbreds in his Rancho Del Paso spread in California, expanded Elmendorf by buying quite a few of the surrounding farms. Under Haggin, the farm grew to over to over 8,900-acre (36 km^{2}) with 2,000 horses — his total investment was some $2 million. The expanded farm was centered along the Paris Pike, with over five miles of road frontage. In buying Elmendorf, Haggin bought Salvator, Miss Woodford, Firenze, Star Ruby, Water Boy, Hamburg Bell and quite a few other good horses. He stood the great Salvator here until the horse's death in 1909. It is possible that Salvator lies in an unmarked grave at Elmendorf.

Haggin also built a $300,000 mansion on a small hill overlooking Elk Horn which he called "Green Hills", a great Southern Mansion in style and feeling. He also built a model dairy farm and a greenhouse which he filled with exotic plants. The first record of Dexter cattle in the United States is when more than two hundred head were imported between 1905 and 1915, a large number of which were imported by Elmendorf Farm.

Haggin's extensive Kentucky interests, including Elmendorf Farm, were managed in his absence by Charles Henry Berryman of Lexington. The Berryman family lived on farm property in a house that is still called the Berryman House. After "Green Hills" was demolished by Joseph Widener, the Berryman Home was the only habitable mansion on the farm and as such was occupied by Widener's grandson, Peter A. B. Widener III (1925–1999) and his family during the 1950s.

When Haggin died in 1914, the estate was broken up.

=== Joseph E. Widener ===
In 1923, Joseph Widener (1871–1943) and his nephew, George, bought a part of Elmendorf. Joseph operated his portion as Elmendorf Form. George operated his portion as Old Kenney Farm. From then until the 1940s, the main part of Elmendorf was owned by Joseph Early Widener and then by his son Peter A. B. Widener II. In 1929, the elder Widener tore down Haggins' mansion "Green Hills" to void taxes on the unoccupied behemoth. He left the mansion's stately marble pillars which became a Central Kentucky landmark.

Widener bought the stallion Fair Play as well as the broodmare Mahubah at the dispersal sale of August Belmont. Fair Play and Mahubah, who were the sire and dam of Man o' War, are buried at what is now called Normandy Farm.

=== Maxwell Gluck ===
In 1950, Maxwell Henry Gluck (1896–1984) purchased the original section of Elmendorf Farm along with its name rights. Gluck, Chairman of the Board of Directors of the Darlington Stores Corporation and later the United States Ambassador to Ceylon, had his first success in racing when he bought Prince John for $14,300 at the 1954 yearling sales. The pillars of Haggins' "Green Hills" remained on Gluck's farm, and in front of them are buried Gluck's juvenile champion Protagonist (by Prince John), Speak John (also by Prince John), and Verbatim. Gluck owned Elmendorf until his death in 1984 after which his widow sold it and about 350 horses to Jack Kent Cooke.

=== Jack Kent Cooke ===
Cooke continued to use the property for his broodmare band until 1997, when he sold the remaining horses to Stonerside Stable. The property was sold to Dinwiddie Lampton, and is currently owned by the Lampton family's American Life and Accident Insurance Company.

== Break up ==
By 1951 Elmendorf had been reduced bit by bit as various parcels were sold off. The original section went to Max Gluck, along with its name - Elmendorf - and the remaining pillars of Green Hills. E. Barry Ryan bought the section with the original cemetery, calling it Normandy Farm whereon stood the statue of Fair Play erected by Widener. Buried in front of the statue are both Fair Play and Mahubah as well as many of their best sons and daughters bred by Widener, and quite a few other great runners. Other farms that were sliced from Elmendorf include Old Kinney Farm (owned by George D. Widener Jr.) and Clovelly Farm (owned by Robin Scully).

Clovelly Farm still exists, as does the 262-acre (1.06 km^{2}) Normandy Farm. Green Gates Farm, once Spendthrift Farm and then the Old Kenney Farm, also still functions today.

=== Dinwiddie Lampton Jr. ===
Elmendorf was most recently acquired in 1997 for $5 million by Dinwiddie Lampton Jr. (1914–2008), the president of American Life and Accident Co. Lampton and his wife were longtime coaching and pleasure driving enthusiasts with a collection of carriages and carriage horses. Lampton's wife, Elizabeth Whitcomb Lampton, died on March 22, 2008, at age 74, from a carriage accident on the property. Dinwiddie Lampton died six months later on September 25, 2008, at the farm. The family still owns the farm and it is leased to Sancal Racing and Stone Columns Stables at Elmendorf.
