= Beau Genius =

Canadian Thoroughbred racehorse

- Sire: Bold Ruckus
- Grandsire: Boldnesian
- Dam: Royal Colleen
- Damsire: Viceregal
- Sex: Stallion
- Foaled: 1985
- Country: Canada
- Colour: Chestnut
- Breeder: Sovereign Farm
- Owner: Joseph Shiewitz & Dr. Brian Davidson
- Trainer: Gerry Belanger; Gerald S. Bennett (1989)
- Record: 42: 19-7-4
- Earnings: $1,055,600

Major wins
- Display Stakes (1987); Autumn Stakes (1988); Okeechobee Handicap (1989); Thistledown Breeders' Cup Sprint Handicap (1989); Hallandale Handicap (1990); Deputy Minister Handicap (1990); Churchill Downs Handicap (1990); Aristides Breeders' Cup Stakes (1990); Isaac Murphy Handicap (1990); Michigan Mile And One-Eighth Handicap (1990); Philip H. Iselin Handicap (1990)

Beau Genius (foaled May 20, 1985 – July 25, 2014) was a Canadian Thoroughbred racehorse.

== Background ==
Bred at Sovereign Farm by owners Joseph Shiewitz and Dr. Brian Davidson, he was sired by Bold Ruckus, one of Canada's national leading sires who was a grandson of the well-known North American Champion sire, Bold Ruler. The dam of Beau Genius was Royal Colleen, a daughter of Northern Dancer's son, 1968 Canadian Horse of the Year, Viceregal.

== Racing career ==
Conditioned for racing by Gerry Belanger, at age two Beau Genius began his racing career from a base at Woodbine Racetrack in Toronto. He won the 1987 Display Stakes, notably defeating third-place finisher Regal Intention and was second to Regal Intention in the Kingarvie Stakes. As a three-year-old, Beau Genius had his best result with a win in the important Autumn Handicap then at four, racing for new trainer Gerald Bennett, he won Florida's Okeechobee Handicap and later at Thistledown Racecourse in Ohio, the Thistledown Breeders' Cup Sprint Handicap.

At age five, Beau Genius won nine stakes races on various track surfaces. In January 1990, jockey Bill Shoemaker rode the horse to victory in the Hallandale Handicap at Gulfstream Park; this was the final win of Shoemaker's career. Other victories that year included the Isaac Murphy Handicap at Arlington Park over Black Tie Affair and the Michigan Mile And One-Eighth Handicap over Opening Verse. His win in the Grade I Philip H. Iselin Handicap at Monmouth Park marked his sixth consecutive victory.

Beau Genius made two more starts at age five, 3rd in the Meadowlands Cup then 10th in the Breeders Cup Classic then was retired to stud having won more than $1 million.

== Stud career ==
Beau Genius was sent to stand at stud at Vinery, Inc. farm in Lexington, Kentucky. There, he notably sired Belle Genius who won the Group One Moyglare Stud Stakes at the Curragh in Ireland. He sired thirty-two stakes race winners and from 1999 he stood at Donald and Karen Cohn's Ballena Vista Farm in Ramona, California. Beau Genius was euthanized on July 25, 2014.
