= Deceit (horse) =

American-bred Thoroughbred racehorse

- Sire: Prince John
- Grandsire: Princequillo
- Dam: Double Agent
- Damsire: Double Jay
- Sex: Mare
- Foaled: 1968
- Country: United States
- Colour: Dark Bay
- Breeder: Leslie Combs II & Charles H. Wacker III
- Owner: Windfields Farm
- Trainer: Del W. Carroll
- Record: 27: 14-6-4
- Earnings: US$291,230

Major wins
- Astarita Stakes (1970); Colleen Stakes (1970); Fashion Stakes (1970); Polly Drummond Stakes (1970); Acorn Stakes (1971); Matchmaker Stakes (1971); Mother Goose Stakes (1971)

Deceit (foaled May 3, 1968, in Kentucky) was an American Thoroughbred racemare bred by Leslie Combs II and Charles H. Wacker III, and owned by E. P. Taylor's Windfields Farm. Deceit was sired by Prince John, a four-time leading broodmare sire in North America, and out of the mare Double Agent, a daughter of Double Jay who was the 1946 American Champion Two-Year-Old Colt and also a four-time leading broodmare sire in North America.

Trained by Del Carroll, Deceit raced successfully from age two to four, winning several of the important U.S. northeast races for her gender including the Astarita and Fashion Stakes at age two and the first two legs of the Triple Tiara, the Acorn and Mother Goose Stakes at three.

== Dam of a Champion ==
When her racing career ended, Deceit was sent to stand at the Windfields Farm Maryland division. She was bred first to E. P. Taylor's super-stallion, Northern Dancer then to other important stallions such as Herbager, Graustark, The Minstrel, Nijinsky, Assert and Deputy Minister, among others. However, it was a match with Taylor's Vice Regent which produced Deceit Dancer, the 1984 Canadian Champion Two-Year-Old Filly.

Deceit was buried at E.P. Taylors Oshawa Ontario Windfields Farm which is now defunct. The status of the gravesite area, shared with other important Windfields horses, remains in question since a residential subdivision is to be built near the gravesite area.

== Pedigree ==
Pedigree of Deceit
Sire Prince John	Princequillo	Prince Rose	Rose Prince
Sire Prince John	Princequillo	Prince Rose	Indolence
Sire Prince John	Princequillo	Cosquilla	Papyrus
Sire Prince John	Princequillo	Cosquilla	Quick Thought
Sire Prince John	Not Afraid	Count Fleet	Reigh Count
Sire Prince John	Not Afraid	Count Fleet	Quickly
Sire Prince John	Not Afraid	Banish Fear	Blue Larkspur
Sire Prince John	Not Afraid	Banish Fear	Herodiade
Dam Double Agent	Double Jay	Balladier	Black Toney
Dam Double Agent	Double Jay	Balladier	Blue Warbler
Dam Double Agent	Double Jay	Broomshot	Whisk Broom
Dam Double Agent	Double Jay	Broomshot	Centre Shot
Dam Double Agent	Conniver	Discovery	Display
Dam Double Agent	Conniver	Discovery	Ariadne
Dam Double Agent	Conniver	The Schemer	Challenger
Dam Double Agent	Conniver	The Schemer	Granny
