= Belle Genius =

American-bred Thoroughbred racehorse (born 1992)

- Sire: Beau Genius
- Grandsire: Bold Ruckus
- Dam: Time and Tide
- Damsire: Mr Leader
- Sex: Mare
- Foaled: 5 April 1992
- Country: United States
- Colour: Chestnut
- Breeder: Lindsay A Semple
- Owner: L J Rice; Godolphin
- Trainer: Paul Kelleway; Saeed bin Suroor
- Record: 6: 2-0-0
- Earnings: £103,155

Major wins
- Moyglare Stud Stakes (1994)

Belle Genius (born 5 April 1992) was an American-bred, Irish-trained Thoroughbred racehorse and broodmare. Bought for only $8,500 as a yearling, she was matched against high-class opposition from the start of her track career. After finishing fifth in the Chesham Stakes and the Cherry Hinton Stakes she won a minor event at Thirsk before recording her biggest win in the Group 1 Moyglare Stud Stakes. She went on to finish fourth in the Breeders' Cup Juvenile Fillies but was then sent to Dubai and finished unplaced on her only subsequent start. After her retirement from racing she became a broodmare and had some success as a dam of winners. Her last recorded foal was born in 2009.

== Background ==
Belle Genius was a chestnut mare bred in Kentucky by Lindsay A. Semple. As a yearling in September 1993 she was consigned to the Keeneland sale but attracted little interest and was bought for $8,500 by the bloodstock agency Newmarket International. The filly was sent to Europe where she entered the ownership of L J Rice and joined the Newmarket stable of Paul Kelleway, a trainer who had built his reputation by winning major races with cheaply-bought horses.

She was from the first crop of foals sired by the Canadian-bred stallion Beau Genius who won several major stakes races in North America including the Philip H. Iselin Stakes in 1990. Belle Genius's dam Time and Tide showed very modest racing ability, winning one minor race from nine starts. She was descended from Sailor Hat, a half-sister to the dam of Godetia.

== Racing career ==
=== 1994: two-year-old season ===
Rather than beginning her racing career in a maiden race Belle Genius made her track debut in the Chesham Stakes over six furlongs at Royal Ascot on 16 June. Ridden by Michael Wigham she started a 50/1 outsider but was beaten by less than three lengths as she finished fifth behind the colt Montjoy. On 5 July the filly was stepped up to Group 3 class for the Cherry Hinton Stakes at Newmarket Racecourse and started the 33/1 outsider of the seven-runner field. She led in the early stages before fading in the last quarter mile and coming home fifth behind Red Carnival. Paul Eddery took over from Whigham when the filly was dropped in class for a maiden race over seven furlongs at Thirsk Racecourse on 8 August. The race was an "auction" event, meaning that the weights were determined by the prices fetched by the offspring of the participants' sires at the yearling sales. Starting favourite against thirteen opponents she led approaching the final furlong and won by a length from Juweilla to whom she was conceding ten pounds in weight.

Jason Weaver took the ride when Belle Genius was sent to Ireland to contest the Group 1 Moyglare Stud Stakes over seven furlongs at the Curragh on 11 September and started a 20/1 outsider. The Phoenix Stakes winner Eva Luna started favourite while the other six runners included Sharp Point (runner-up in the Phoenix), Tereshkova (Prix de Cabourg) and Glounthaune Garden (Debutante Stakes). Belle Genius was among the leaders from the start a Beating the Buzz set the pace, before going to the front just inside the last quarter mile. She kept on well in the closing stages to win by one and a half lengths from Tereshkova with Eva Luna a length away in third.

Following her win at the Curragh, Belle Genius was bought privately for an undisclosed sum by Sheikh Mohammed's Godolphin organisation. For her final appearance of the season the filly was sent to the United States for the Breeders' Cup Juvenile Fillies at Churchill Downs on 5 November. Racing on dirt for the first time she made steady progress in the second half of the race and came home fourth behind Flanders, Serena's Song and Stormy Blues.

=== 1996: four-year-old season ===
After the end of her first season, Belle Genius joined the stable of Godolphin's main trainer Saeed bin Suroor and relocated to the United Arab Emirates. She missed the whole of the 1995 season before returning in March 1996 when she finished fifth in a handicap race at Jebel Ali.

== Breeding record ==
After her retirement from racing Belle Genius became a broodmare for Sheikh Mohammed's Darley Stud. He produced at least nine foals and six winners between 1998 and 2009:

- Battish, a bay colt (later gelded), foaled in 1998, sired by Pennekamp. Won one race.
- Birjand, bay filly, 1999, by Green Desert. Won three races. Dam of Lucky Nine.
- Rozanee, chestnut filly, 2000, by Nashwan. Failed to win in six races.
- Bin Rahy, chestnut colt (gelded), 2003, by Rahy. Won one race.
- Fereeji, bay colt (gelded), 2004, by Cape Cross. Won two races.
- Dellini, bay filly, 2005, by Green Desert. Won one race.
- Zelloof, bay filly, 2006, by Kheleyf. Won one race.
- Wisecraic, chestnut colt (gelded), 2007, by Kheleyf. Won two races.
- Muzdaan, chestnut filly, 2009, by Exceed And Excel. Failed to win in two races.

== Pedigree ==
Pedigree of Belle Genius (USA), chestnut mare, 1992
| Sire Beau Genius (CAN) 1985 | Bold Ruckus (USA); 1976 | Boldnesian | Bold Ruler |
| Sire Beau Genius (CAN) 1985 | Bold Ruckus (USA); 1976 | Boldnesian | Alanesian |
| Sire Beau Genius (CAN) 1985 | Bold Ruckus (USA); 1976 | Raise A Ruckus | Raise A Native |
| Sire Beau Genius (CAN) 1985 | Bold Ruckus (USA); 1976 | Raise A Ruckus | Fine Feathers |
| Sire Beau Genius (CAN) 1985 | Royal Colleen (CAN); 1973 | Viceregal | Northern Dancer |
| Sire Beau Genius (CAN) 1985 | Royal Colleen (CAN); 1973 | Viceregal | Victoria Regina |
| Sire Beau Genius (CAN) 1985 | Royal Colleen (CAN); 1973 | Own Colleen | Queen's Own |
| Sire Beau Genius (CAN) 1985 | Royal Colleen (CAN); 1973 | Own Colleen | Fair Colleen |
| Dam Time and Tide (USA) 1984 | Mr Leader (USA); 1966 | Hail To Reason | Turn-To |
| Dam Time and Tide (USA) 1984 | Mr Leader (USA); 1966 | Hail To Reason | Nothirdchance |
| Dam Time and Tide (USA) 1984 | Mr Leader (USA); 1966 | Deja Jolie | Djeddah |
| Dam Time and Tide (USA) 1984 | Mr Leader (USA); 1966 | Deja Jolie | Bellesoeur |
| Dam Time and Tide (USA) 1984 | Irish Wave (USA); 1979 | Raise A Native | Native Dancer |
| Dam Time and Tide (USA) 1984 | Irish Wave (USA); 1979 | Raise A Native | Raise You |
| Dam Time and Tide (USA) 1984 | Irish Wave (USA); 1979 | Wave O'Brien | Irish Lancer |
| Dam Time and Tide (USA) 1984 | Irish Wave (USA); 1979 | Wave O'Brien | Sailor Hat (Family: 6-a) |

- Belle Genius was inbred 3 × 4 to Raise A Native, meaning that this stallion appears in both the third and fourth generations of her pedigree.
