= Key to the Moon =

Canadian thoroughbred racehorse (1981–1988)

- Sire: Wajima
- Grandsire: Bold Ruler
- Dam: Kamar
- Damsire: Key to the Mint
- Sex: Stallion
- Foaled: 1981
- Country: Canada
- Colour: Dark Bay/Brown
- Breeder: Bahnam K. Yousif
- Owner: B. K. Y Stables
- Trainer: Gil Rowntree
- Record: 50:13-10-3
- Earnings: Can$714,536

Major wins
- Display Stakes (1983); Marine Stakes (1984); Discovery Handicap (1984); Gulfstream Park Sprint Championship (1985); Durham Cup Handicap (1986); Dominion Day Handicap (1986) Canadian Classic Race wins: Queen's Plate (1984)

Awards
- Canadian Champion 3-Year-Old Male Horse (1984)

Honours
- Key To The Moon Handicap at Woodbine Racetrack

Key to the Moon (February 24, 1981 – 1988) was a Canadian thoroughbred champion racehorse.

== Background ==
Bred and raced by Bahnam K. Yousif, he was sired by Wajima, the 1975 American Champion Three-Year-Old Male Horse. Key to the Moon's dam was Kamar, winner of the 1979 Canadian Oaks and a daughter of Key to the Mint, the 1972 American Champion Three-Year-Old Male Horse.

Conditioned for racing by future Canadian Horse Racing Hall of Fame trainer, Gil Rowntree, at age two Key to the Moon won the 1983 Display Stakes at his home base, Woodbine Racetrack in Toronto, Ontario. The colt helped Bahnam K. Yousif earn the 1983 Sovereign Award for Outstanding Owner.

== Racing career ==
Key to the Moon raced in the United States and Canada in 1984, winning the Discovery Handicap at Aqueduct Racetrack and at Woodbine Racetrack, the Marine Stakes and Canada's most prestigious race, the Queen's Plate.

In 1985, Key to the Moon again raced in the United States and Canada, notably winning the 1985 Gulfstream Park Sprint Championship and finishing second in the Grade 1 Gulfstream Park Handicap to Dr. Carter. However, after breaking a coffin bone in his left front foot while competing in the March 10th Seminole Stakes at Hialeah Park Race Track, he was out of racing for six months. In 1986 Key to the Moon won the Durham Cup and Dominion Day Handicaps at Woodbine.

== Stud career ==
Retired to stud at Gardiner Farms in Caledon East, Ontario, Key to the Moon stood for just two years before his untimely death on August 3, 1988. The promising seven-year-old stallion was galloping in his paddock when he shattered the cannon bone of his right foreleg. He was taken to the veterinary hospital at the University of Guelph but could not be saved and was humanely euthanized.

Despite a very short stallion career, Key to the Moon notably sired:

- Shiny Key (b. 1988) - won 1993 Niagara Handicap, Bunty Lawless Stakes and 1994 Connaught Cup Stakes, Jockey Club Cup Handicap at Woodbine;
- Waheed (b. 1988) - won Vandal Stakes at Woodbine;
- Moon Mist (b. 1989) - winner of the 1992 Fury Stakes at Woodbine and the 1993 Barbara Fritchie Handicap at Laurel Park Racecourse.

== Pedigree ==
Pedigree of Key to the Moon
| Sire Wajima | Bold Ruler | Nasrullah | Nearco |
| Sire Wajima | Bold Ruler | Nasrullah | Mumtaz Begum |
| Sire Wajima | Bold Ruler | Miss Disco | Discovery |
| Sire Wajima | Bold Ruler | Miss Disco | Outdone |
| Sire Wajima | Iskra | Le Haar | Vieux Manoir |
| Sire Wajima | Iskra | Le Haar | Mince Pie |
| Sire Wajima | Iskra | Fasciola | Fastnet |
| Sire Wajima | Iskra | Fasciola | Foxcraft |
| Dam Kamar | Key to the Mint | Graustark | Ribot |
| Dam Kamar | Key to the Mint | Graustark | Flower Bowl |
| Dam Kamar | Key to the Mint | Key Bridge | Princequillo |
| Dam Kamar | Key to the Mint | Key Bridge | Blue Banner |
| Dam Kamar | Square Angel | Quadrangle | Cohoes |
| Dam Kamar | Square Angel | Quadrangle | Tap Day |
| Dam Kamar | Square Angel | Nangela | Nearctic |
| Dam Kamar | Square Angel | Nangela | Angela's Niece |
