= Glorious Song Stakes =

- Class: Ungraded Stakes
- Location: Woodbine Racetrack; Toronto, Ontario, Canada
- Inaugurated: 1981
- Race type: Thoroughbred - Flat racing
- Website: www.woodbineentertainment.com

Race information
- Distance: Seven furlong
- Surface: Tapeta synthetic dirt
- Track: left-handed
- Qualification: Two-year-old fillies
- Weight: Allowances
- Purse: $100,000
- Bonuses: $25,000 for Ontario-bred horses from the T.I.P./C.T.H.S.)

The Glorious Song Stakes is a Thoroughbred horse race run annually in mid-November at Woodbine Racetrack in Toronto, Ontario, Canada. A race open to Two-year-old fillies, it is contested over a distance of Seven furlongs. Since 2006 the track surface has been made of a synthetic "all weather" dirt composite.

Inaugurated in 1981 at Toronto's now defunct Greenwood Raceway, in 1994 the race was moved to the Woodbine facility.

It is named in honour of Canadian Horse Racing Hall of Fame filly, Glorious Song, owned by Frank Stronach and Nelson Bunker Hunt.

The Glorious Song Stakes was run in two divisions in 1985.

== Records ==
Speed record: (Through 1998, Woodbine times were recorded in fifths of a second. Since 1999 they are in hundredths of a second)

- 1:21.52 - Win the War (2017)

Most wins by an owner:

- 3 - Sam-Son Farm (1986, 1987, 1997)
- 3 - Live Oak Plantation (2016, 2018, 2020)

Most wins by a jockey:

- 7 - Patrick Husbands (2002, 2006, 2009, 2013, 2014, 2017, 2020)

Most wins by a trainer:

- 9 - Mark Casse (2004, 2005, 2006, 2013, 2014, 2016, 2017, 2018, 2020)

== Winners ==
Year	Winner	Age	Jockey	Trainer	Owner	Dist. (Furlongs)	Time	Win $
2020	Souper Sensational	2	Patrick Husbands	Mark Casse	Live Oak Plantation	7 f	1:21.84	$60,000
2019	New York Groove	2	Pablo Morales	Michael J. Trombetta	Commonwealth New Era Racing	7 f	1:22.56	$60,000
2018	Souper Charlotte	2	Eurico Rosa Da Silva	Mark Casse	Live Oak Plantation	7 f	1:23.60	$60,000
2017	Win the War	2	Patrick Husbands	Mark Casse	Gary Barber & John C. Oxley	7 f	1:21.52	$60,000
2016	Let It Ride Mom	2	Rafael Hernandez	Mark Casse	Live Oak Plantation	7 f	1:22.69	$75,000
2015	Ami's Mesa	2	Luis Contreras	Josie Carroll	Ivan Dalos	7 f	1:23.43	$90,000
2014	Mississippi Delta	2	Patrick Husbands	Mark Casse	Jackpot Ranch & Michael G. Rutherford	7 f	1:22.17	$75,000
2013	Zensational Bunny	2	Patrick Husbands	Mark Casse	Gary Barber	7 f	1:23.20	$75,000
2012	Leinan	2	Luis Contreras	Josie Carroll	James & Alice Sapara	7 f	1:23.73	$90,000
2011	Tu Endie Wei	2	James Mcaleney	Reade Baker	Brereton C. Jones	7 f	1:21.97	$90,000
2010	Anne's Beauty	2	David Clark	Paul Attard	Robert Smithen	7 f	1:22.64	$90,000
2009	Cascading	2	Patrick Husbands	Josie Carroll	Hill 'N' Dale Farms & Edward McGhee	7 f	1:23.05	$90,000
2008	Selva	2	Emma-Jayne Wilson	David M. Carroll	Helen Alexander & Helen Groves	7 f	1:22.94	$90,000
2007	Initiation	2	Jeremy Rose	H. Graham Motion	Augustin Stable	7 f	1:22.75	$75,000
2006	Sealy Hill	2	Patrick Husbands	Mark Casse	Melnyk Racing Stables	7 f	1:23.88	$105,000
2005	Top Notch Lady	2	Ray Sabourin	Mark Casse	Robert J. Wilson	7 f	1:23.86	$83,925
2004	Shout To The North	2	Emile Ramsammy	Mark Casse	Tommy Town Thoroughbreds	7 f	1:25.65	$82,125
2003	Silver Bird	2	Jim McAleney	Reade Baker	James McAlpine	7 f	1:23.07	$112,125
2002	Buffalo Jump	2	Patrick Husbands	Josie Carroll	Eaton Hall Farm	7 f	1:24.22	$110,850
2001	Boston Twist	2	Gary Boulanger	Josie Carroll	William Schettine	7 f	1:25.04	$65,940
2000	Poetically	2	David Clark	Roger Attfield	Kinghaven Farms	7 f	1:22.20	$66,360
1999	Golden Path	2	David Clark	Nickolas DeToro	Nickolas DeToro	7 f	1:25.41	$54,492
1998	Appealing Phylly	2	Todd Kabel	Thomas R. Bowden	Colebrook Farms (John Burness)	7 f	1:22.60	$39,060
1997	Misty Hour	2	Emile Ramsammy	Mark Frostad	Sam-Son Farm	7 f	1:22.20	$40,284
1996	No Foul Play	2	Steve Bahen	Margaret Spencer	Margaret Spencer	7 f	1:26.60	$50,220
1995	Hello Rachel	2	Dave Penna	Roger Attfield	Windhaven	7 f	1:25.40	$49,545
1994	Krz Ldy	2	Larry Attard	Mike DePaulo	Ron Guidolin et al.	7 f	1:24.80	$40,464
1993	Avies Covergirl	2	Ray Sabourin	Steve Owens	Steve Owens	7 f	1:27.00	$33,930
1992	Hey Hazel	2	Don Seymour	Roger Attfield	Mickey Canino	7 f	1:26.00	$47,502
1991	Debra's Victory	2	Mickey Walls	Phil England	Knob Hill Stable	7 f	1:25.60	$47,376
1990	Canadian Envoy	2	Jim McAleney	Macdonald Benson	Windfields Farm	7 f	1:25.40	$45,162
1989	So Long Seoul	2	Irwin Driedger	P. Noel Hickey	Irish Acres Farm	7 f	1:26.20	$39,312
1988	Dance For Lucy	2	Dave Penna	Sheldon Wolfe	Hellenic Stable, et al.	7 f	1:28.60	$37,026
1987	Tilt My Halo	2	Jim McAleney	James E. Day	Sam-Son Farm	7 f	1:27.40	$34,170
1986	Water Chimes	2	Dave Penna	James E. Day	Sam-Son Farm	7 f	1:27.60	$33,030
1985-1	Miss Tressette	2	Dave Penna	Joseph Attard	Frank Russo & C. Russo	7 f	1:29.00	$23,985
1985-2	Grecian Touch	2	Richard Dos Ramos	Herbert Schnitzler	Longview Farm	7 f	1:29.00	$23,985
1984	Deceit Dancer	2	Dan Beckon	Gil Rowntree	Maktoum Al Maktoum	7 f	1:26.40	$34,590
1983	Proud Halo	2	Robert King Jr.	Gerry Moerman	Shefry Farms/Shefsky	7 f	1:28.40	$34,410
1982	L'Epee	2	John Bell	Emile M. Allain	Terfloth Farm	7 f	1:27.20	$35,220
1981	Chaleur	2	David Clark	Michael J. Doyle	Bo-Teek Farms	7 f	1:28.60	$27,240
