= Deceit Dancer =

Canadian-bred Thoroughbred racehorse

- Sire: Vice Regent
- Grandsire: Northern Dancer
- Dam: Deceit
- Damsire: Prince John
- Sex: Stallion
- Foaled: 1982
- Country: Canada
- Colour: Chestnut
- Breeder: E. P. Taylor
- Owner: 1) B. K. Y. Stable; 2) Maktoum Al Maktoum
- Trainer: Gil Rowntree
- Record: 20: 7-2-5
- Earnings: $249,935

Major wins
- My Dear Stakes (1984); Fanfreluche Stakes (1984); Glorious Song Stakes (1984); Fury Stakes (1985)

Awards
- Canadian Champion Two-Year-Old Filly (1984)
- Last updated on May 14, 2010

Deceit Dancer (foaled 1982 in Ontario) is a Canadian Champion filly Thoroughbred racehorse.

== Background ==
Bred by E. P. Taylor, owner of her sire, Vice Regent, and her dam, Deceit, Deceit Dancer was purchased by Kleinburg, Ontario racing stable owner Bahnam K. Yousif.

Deceit Dancer was conditioned for racing by future Canadian Horse Racing Hall of Fame trainer Gil Rowntree from a base of Woodbine Racetrack in Toronto, Ontario, Canada.

== Racing career ==
In 1984, the two-year-old Deceit Dancer won five of her six starts including three stakes wins. Racing for her owner's nom de course, B.K.Y. Stables, she won the My Dear. For new owner, Prime Minister Maktoum Al Maktoum of the United Arab Emirates, who reportedly paid $1 million for her, she won the Fanfreluche and Glorious Song Stakes. Deceit Dancer's performances earned her the 1984 Sovereign Award for Canadian Champion Two-Year-Old Filly.

On February 13, 1985, Deceit Dancer made her three-year-old debut in a division of the Joe Namath Stakes at Gulfstream Park running a distant third to winner, One Fine Lady. She went on to run third in the Canadian Oaks and win her only significant race of the year, the Fury Stakes at her Woodbine Racetrack home base.
