= Glorious Song =

Canadian-bred Thoroughbred racehorse

- Sire: Halo
- Grandsire: Hail To Reason
- Dam: Ballade
- Damsire: Herbager
- Sex: Filly
- Foaled: 1976
- Country: Canada
- Colour: Bay
- Breeder: E. P. Taylor
- Owner: Frank Stronach & Nelson Bunker Hunt
- Trainer: Fred H. Loschke; Gerry Belanger (1980); John Cairns (1981)
- Record: 34: 17-9-1
- Earnings: $1,004,534

Major wins
- Belle Mahone Stakes (1979); Canadian Maturity Stakes (1980); Maple Leaf Stakes (1979); Dominion Day Stakes (1980, 1981); La Cañada Stakes (1980); Santa Margarita Handicap (1980); Top Flight Handicap (1980); Michigan Mile And One-Eighth Handicap (1980); Spinster Stakes (1981); Santa Maria Handicap (1981)

Awards
- Canadian Champion Older Female Horse (1980, 1981); United States Champion Older Female Horse (1980); Canadian Horse of the Year (1980)

Honours
- Canadian Horse Racing Hall of Fame (1995); Glorious Song Stakes at Woodbine Racetrack
- Last updated on July 1, 2007

Glorious Song (1976–2003) was a Hall of Fame Thoroughbred racehorse who was a Champion in Canada and the United States and became an important broodmare. Bred by the prominent horseman E. P. Taylor at his Windfields Farm in Oshawa, Ontario, she was sired by Halo and out of the mare Ballade, who also produced U.S. Champion Devil's Bag.

Part of Windfields' annual consignment of yearlings to the Canadian Thoroughbred Horse Society sale at Woodbine Racetrack, Glorious Song was purchased for $36,000 by local businessman Frank Stronach, who at the time was just beginning to build a very successful Thoroughbred racing stable.

== Racing career ==
Under trainer Fred H. Loschke, at age two Glorious Song won her only start. Texas businessman Nelson Bunker Hunt then purchased a half-interest in her in 1981. In 1979, the three-year-old filly won five significant stakes races at Woodbine Racetrack, and the following year she was never out of the money in her eleven starts. The dominant horse in Canada and the top racing mare in the United States, in 1980 she won races that included the first of two consecutive Dominion Day Stakes at Woodbine Racetrack. Then, under new trainer Gerry Belanger in 1979/80, she raced in the United States, where her coast-to-coast wins included the Top Flight Handicap at New York City's Aqueduct Racetrack, the Michigan Mile And One-Eighth Handicap at Detroit Racecourse, and the La Cañada Stakes and Santa Margarita Handicap at California's Santa Anita Park.

Glorious Song's 1980 performances included three consecutive Grade 1 wins and victories over some of the top male horses on the continent. As well, she ran second to future Hall of Fame inductee and Kentucky Derby/Preakness Stakes winner Spectacular Bid in the 1980 Haskell Invitational Handicap and earned another second against males in the Marlboro Cup. She was voted 1980 United States Champion Older Female Horse and Canadian Champion Older Female Horse, as well as the Canadian Horse of the Year title.

In 1981, Glorious Song was assigned to trainer John Cairns. Although her 1981 racing season was hampered by various problems, she still earned a second-place finish in the Beldame Stakes and won the Grade 1 Santa Maria Handicap at Santa Anita Park as well as her second Dominion Day Stakes, in which she set a Woodbine track record for a mile and one-eighth. That year, her career earnings topped the $1 million figure, the first for a Canadian Thoroughbred racehorse. She earned her second straight Sovereign Award for Champion Older Female Horse.

== Broodmare career ==
A champion on the track, Glorious Song proved equally successful as a broodmare. She notably produced the Blushing Groom colt Rahy, by whom she became the granddam of U.S. Racing Hall of Fame filly Serena's Song and 2001 European Horse of the Year Fantastic Light. In addition, Glorious Song foaled Singspiel by In The Wings. Singspiel was voted the 1996 Eclipse Award for Outstanding Male Turf Horse and scored Grade I victories on three continents including the Canadian International Stakes, Japan Cup, Dubai World Cup, Coronation Cup, and International Stakes. She also produced Rakeen (by Northern Dancer) who sired Champion South African racehorse Jet Master, a winner of 17 of his 24 starts and Champion Sire in South Africa for 7 seasons.

Acquired by Sheikh Mohammed bin Rashid Al Maktoum, Glorious Song was at his Dalham Hall Stud in Newmarket, England, when she died in July 2003 at age twenty-seven following intestinal surgery.
