= Eva Luna (horse) =

Irish-bred Thoroughbred racehorse

Eva Luna (IRE)
- Sire: Double Schwartz
- Grandsire: Double Form
- Dam: Guess Again
- Damsire: Stradavinsky
- Sex: Stallion
- Foaled: 28 February 1992
- Country: Ireland
- Colour: Bay
- Breeder: David Shubotham
- Owner: Catherine Shubotham; Mrs A J F O'Reilly
- Trainer: Jim Bolger
- Record: 8: 5-0-1
- Earnings: £134,167

Major wins
- Silver Flash Stakes (1994); Railway Stakes (1994); Phoenix Stakes (1994)

Eva Luna (IRE) (28 February 1992 – after 2010) was an Irish-bred Thoroughbred racehorse and broodmare. At the age of two in 1994 she was one of the best horses of her generation in Ireland when she won her first five races including the Silver Flash Stakes, Railway Stakes and Phoenix Stakes. Her winning run came to an end when she finished third in the Moyglare Stud Stakes, and in 1993 she failed to recapture her juvenile form. After her retirement from racing she became a broodmare and produced a few minor winners. The last of her recorded offspring was foaled in 2010.

== Background ==
Eva Luna was a bay mare bred in Ireland by David Shubotham. She began her racing career in the ownership of Catherine Shubotham and was trained by Jim Bolger at Coolcullen, County Carlow. She was ridden in all of her races by her trainer's son-in-law Kevin Manning.

She was probably the best horse sired by Double Schwartz, a sprinter who won the Prix de l'Abbaye, Diadem Stakes, Temple Stakes and Palace House Stakes as a five-year-old in 1986. Eva Luna's dam Guess Again was a German-bred mare who showed modest racing ability, winning one minor race and placing ten times from seventeen starts. She was a granddaughter of Fanghorn (foaled 1966) who finished third in the Poule d'Essai des Pouliches. As a broodmare Fanghorn produced Double Form (sire of Double Schwartz) and was the female-line ancestor of Soldier of Fortune.

Two high-class fillies named Eva Luna were foaled in 1992. The other Eva Luna was an American-bred mare who won the Park Hill Stakes and went on to produce the St Leger winner Brian Boru. The two horses may be distinguished by their national suffixes: Eva Luna (IRE) and Eva Luna (USA).

== Racing career ==
=== 1994: two-year-old season ===
Eva Luna made her racecourse debut in a maiden race over furlongs at Leopardstown Racecourse on 16 April in which she started at odds of 7/4 and won from ten opponents. Two weeks later, she followed up in a minor race at Naas Racecourse over the same distance, winning by three quarters of a lengths from Corso at odds of 2/5.

The filly was then moved up in class and distance for the Listed Silver Flash Stakes over six furlongs at Leopardstown on 8 June in which she started second favourite behind the Dermot Weld-trained Sharp Point. After matching strides with the favourite in the first half mile before gaining the advantage and keeping on well to win by half a length. At the Curragh eighteen days later Eva Luna was stepped up again for the Group 3 Railway Stakes in which she was matched against two male opponents, namely Helmsman (runner-up in the Chesham Stakes) and Jahid. She disputed the lead in the early stages before breaking clear of her rivals in the last quarter mile and winning by three and a half lengths.

The Group 1 Phoenix Stakes on 7 August appeared likely to be dominated by British-trained challengers with the Prix Robert Papin winner General Monash starting favourite ahead of Fallow (July Stakes) and Mind Games (Norfolk Stakes). Eva Luna was next in the betting on 6/1 alongside her stablemate Desert Style whilst the other five runners included Sharp Pont and the Woodcote Stakes winner Silca Blanka. The filly was up with the leaders from the start before opening up a clear advantage approaching the final furlong and won by a length and a half from Sharp Point with three and a half lengths back to Desert Style in third. On her final appearance of the season, Eva Luna was stepped up in distance and started favourite for the Moyglare Stud Stakes over seven furlongs at the Curragh but was beaten into third place behind the 20/1 outsider Belle Genius and the French-trained Tereshkova.

At the end of the year Eva Luna was sold privately and entered the ownership of Mrs A J F O'Reilly.

=== 1995: three-year-old season ===
On her first run of 1995 Eva Luna started favourite for the Leopardstown 1,000 Guineas Trial Stakes on 15 April but after reaching third place in the straight she began to struggle and came home fourth behind Khaytada. After a two-month break the filly was matched against colts and older horses in the King's Stand Stakes at Royal Ascot. She made little impact as she started slowly and finished last of the ten runners.

== Breeding record ==
Eva Luna was retired from racing to become a broodmare for her owner's stud. She produced at least twelve foals and three minor winners between 1997 and 2010:

- Burma Tiger, a bay colt, (later gelded), foaled in 1997, sired by Indian Ridge. Won one race.
- Feet of Fire, bay colt, 1998, by Sadler's Wells. Failed to win in seven races.
- Evasif, colt (gelded), 1999, by Danehill
- Robert Emmet, bay colt, 2000, by Sadler's Wells. Unraced.
- National Swagger, bay filly, 2002, by Giant's Causeway. Won one race.
- Sealez, bay colt, 2003, by Fasliyev. Failed to win in three races.
- Strut the Stage, bay colt (gelded), 2004, by Lil's Boy. Failed to win in 24 races.
- Evita Evita, bay filly, 2005, by Acclamation. Failed to win in two races.
- Key Light, bay filly, 2007, by Acclamation. Won two races. Dam of Beacon (Flying Childers Stakes).
- Keep It Real, bay colt (gelded), 2008, by Chevalier.
- Caonach, bay filly, 2009, by Moss Vale. Failed to win in four races.
- Write To Me, bay filly, 2010, by Iffraaj. Failed to win three races.

== Pedigree ==
Pedigree of Eva Luna (IRE), bay mare, 1992
Sire Double Schwartz (IRE) 1981	Double Form (IRE); 1975	Habitat	Sir Gaylord
Sire Double Schwartz (IRE) 1981	Double Form (IRE); 1975	Habitat	Little Hut
Sire Double Schwartz (IRE) 1981	Double Form (IRE); 1975	Fanghorn	Crocket
Sire Double Schwartz (IRE) 1981	Double Form (IRE); 1975	Fanghorn	Honeymoon House
Sire Double Schwartz (IRE) 1981	Cassy's Pet (IRE); 1971	Sing Sing	Tudor Minstrel
Sire Double Schwartz (IRE) 1981	Cassy's Pet (IRE); 1971	Sing Sing	Agin the Law
Sire Double Schwartz (IRE) 1981	Cassy's Pet (IRE); 1971	Cassydora	Nasrullah
Sire Double Schwartz (IRE) 1981	Cassy's Pet (IRE); 1971	Cassydora	Glen Line
Dam Guess Again (GER) 1981	Stradavinsky (IRE); 1975	Nijinsky	Northern Dancer
Dam Guess Again (GER) 1981	Stradavinsky (IRE); 1975	Nijinsky	Flaming Page
Dam Guess Again (GER) 1981	Stradavinsky (IRE); 1975	Seximee	Hasty Road
Dam Guess Again (GER) 1981	Stradavinsky (IRE); 1975	Seximee	Jambo
Dam Guess Again (GER) 1981	Galka (IRE); 1976	Deep Diver	Gulf Pearl
Dam Guess Again (GER) 1981	Galka (IRE); 1976	Deep Diver	Miss Stephen
Dam Guess Again (GER) 1981	Galka (IRE); 1976	Fanghorn	Crocket
Dam Guess Again (GER) 1981	Galka (IRE); 1976	Fanghorn	Honeymoon House (Family: 14-c)

- Eva Luna was inbred 3 × 3 to Fanghorn, meaning that this mare appears twice in the third generation of her pedigree.
