= Vice Regent =

Canadian-bred Thoroughbred racehorse

- Sire: Northern Dancer
- Grandsire: Nearctic
- Dam: Victoria Regina
- Damsire: Menetrier
- Sex: Stallion
- Foaled: April 29, 1967
- Country: Canada
- Colour: Chestnut
- Breeder: E. P. Taylor
- Owner: E. P. Taylor
- Trainer: Gordon J. McCann
- Record: 5: 2-1-0
- Earnings: $6,215

Honours
- Canadian Horse Racing Hall of Fame (1989); Vice Regent Stakes at Woodbine Racetrack

Vice Regent (April 29, 1967 – June 18, 1995) was a Canadian Hall of Fame Thoroughbred racehorse and Canada's leading sire for thirteen years. Owned and bred by E. P. Taylor, he was from Northern Dancer's second crop and out of the mare Victoria Regina, a daughter of the French multiple stakes winner Menetrier whom E. P. Taylor purchased as a sire from François Dupré and imported to Canada.

Vice Regent was a full brother to Viceregal who earned Canadian Horse of the Year honours as a two-year-old in 1968. As such, on his debut one year later in 1969, much was expected from Vice Regent. Conditioned by future Hall of Fame trainer Gordon J. McCann, as a result of injuries and an accident, Vice Regent raced only five times before being forced into retirement.

== Stud record ==
Standing at stud at his owner's Windfields Farm, his outstanding performance as a sire earned him a 1989 induction in the Canadian Horse Racing Hall of Fame. During his career, Vice Regent produced four hundred foals, of which sixty were stakes winners.

Vice Regent's notable offspring includes:

- Regal Embrace – won 1978 Queen's Plate
- Deputy Minister – U.S. champion Two-Year-Old Colt (1981), Canadian Horse of the Year (1981), Leading sire in North America (1997, 1998), Leading broodmare sire in North America (2007)
- Fraud Squad – 1983 Canadian Champion Sprinter
- Deceit Dancer – 1984 Canadian Champion 2-Year-Old Filly
- Bounding Away – 1984 Canadian Champion Male Turf Horse
- Ruling Angel – 1986 Canadian Horse of the Year
- Bessarabian – millionaire 1986 Canadian Champion Older Female Horse
- Regal Classic – won 1988 Prince of Wales Stakes, Canadian Champion 2-Year-Old Colt
- Regal Intention – won 1988 Queen's Plate, Canadian Champion 3-Year-Old Colt
- Sea Regent – 1995 Sovereign Award for Outstanding Broodmare
- Twice The Vice – multiple American Grade I winner of more than US$1.9 million

Vice Regent is the damsire of:

- Benburb – won 1992 Prince of Wales Stakes, Woodbine Mile, Canadian Horse of the Year
- Boston Harbor – won 1996 Breeders' Cup Juvenile, American Champion Two-Year-Old Colt
- Cryptocloser – 1997 Canadian Champion 3-Year-Old Male Horse
- Victory Gallop – won the 1998 Belmont Stakes, 1999 American Champion Older Male Horse
- Captain Steve – won 2001 Dubai World Cup
- Eye of the Sphynx – 2004 Canadian Champion 3-Year-Old Filly

Vice Regent died on June 18, 1995, at the age of twenty-eight and was buried in the equine cemetery at Windfields Farm.

== Pedigree ==
Pedigree of Vice Regent, chestnut stallion, 1967
| Sire Northern Dancer | Nearctic | Nearco | Pharos |
| Sire Northern Dancer | Nearctic | Nearco | Nogara |
| Sire Northern Dancer | Nearctic | Lady Angela | Hyperion |
| Sire Northern Dancer | Nearctic | Lady Angela | Sister Sarah |
| Sire Northern Dancer | Natalma | Native Dancer | Polynesian |
| Sire Northern Dancer | Natalma | Native Dancer | Geisha |
| Sire Northern Dancer | Natalma | Almahmoud | Mahmoud |
| Sire Northern Dancer | Natalma | Almahmoud | Arbitrator |
| Dam Victoria Regina | Menetrier | Fair Copy | Fairway |
| Dam Victoria Regina | Menetrier | Fair Copy | Composure |
| Dam Victoria Regina | Menetrier | La Melodie | Gold Bridge |
| Dam Victoria Regina | Menetrier | La Melodie | La Souriciere |
| Dam Victoria Regina | Victoriana | Windfields | Bunty Lawless |
| Dam Victoria Regina | Victoriana | Windfields | Nandi |
| Dam Victoria Regina | Victoriana | Iribelle | Osiris |
| Dam Victoria Regina | Victoriana | Iribelle | Belmona (family: 10-c) |
