= Dominion Day Stakes =

- Class: Grade III
- Location: Woodbine Racetrack; Toronto, Ontario, Canada
- Inaugurated: 1953
- Race type: Thoroughbred - Flat racing
- Website: www.woodbineentertainment.com

Race information
- Distance: 1 1/4 miles (10 furlongs)
- Surface: Tapeta synthetic dirt
- Track: left-handed
- Qualification: Three-year-olds and up
- Weight: Assigned
- Purse: CAD$150,000

The Dominion Day Stakes is a Thoroughbred horse race run annually in July at Woodbine Racetrack in Toronto, Ontario, Canada. A Grade III event currently offering a purse of CAD$150,000 +, it is open to horses aged three years and up. The race was run at a distance of 1 1/8 miles from its inception until 1983 when it was changed to its present 1 1/4 miles format. It was raced on dirt until 2007 when a polytrack surface was installed. In 2016, the surface was changed to Tapeta synthetic turf.

Inaugurated in 1953 at the Old Woodbine Racetrack, it remained there until the track closed in 1955.

The race celebrates Dominion Day, the birth of the Canadian Confederation on July 1, 1867.

Ace Marine, one of Canada's greatest runners, and its 1955 Horse of the Year, won this race in 1956. In 1972, Canada's 1973 Horse of the Year, Kennedy Road, took the Dominion. The Canadian Champion Three-Year-Old colt of 1972, Nice Dancer, won it in 1973. The 1980 Canadian Horse of the Year as well as the 1980 Champion Older Female in Canada & the USA, plus the 1981 Champion Older Female in Canada, Glorious Song, won it twice—in 1980 & 1981. In 1984, the 1984 Canadian Champion Three-Year-Old colt, Key to the Moon, won the Dominion, and in 1990, Charlie Barley (by the U.S. Triple Crown winner Affirmed) who was the 1989 Champion Grass horse in Canada, came home the winner. 1996 Canadian Horse of the Year, Mt. Sassafras has also won the Dominion Day Stakes twice: 1996 & 1999.

Among other past winners, the 1963 and 2006 editions of the Dominion Day Stakes were won by Kentucky Derby winners, Decidedly and Funny Cide respectively.

== Records ==
Time record: (at current 1 1/4 miles distance)

- 2:01.15 - Phantom Light (2003)

Most wins:

- 2 - Bye and Near (1968, 1969)
- 2 - Glorious Song (1980, 1981)
- 2 - Candid Cameron (1991, 1993)
- 2 - Mt. Sassafras (1996, 1999)
- 2 - Melmich (2016, 2017)

Most wins by an owner:

- 9 - Frank Stronach/Stronach Stables (1980, 1981, 1984, 1989, 2003, 2011, 2012, 2026)

Most wins by a jockey:

- 5 - Todd Kabel (1994, 1997, 2003, 2004, 2007)

Most wins by a trainer:

- 6 - Roger L. Attfield (1995, 2001, 2003, 2011, 2018, 2019)

== Winners of the Dominion Day Stakes since 1979 ==
Year	Winner	Age	Jockey	Trainer	Owner	Time
2026	Runaway Again	4	Ryan Munger	Sic C. Attard	Stronach Stables	1:50.63
2025	Funtastic Again	5	Victor Espinoza	Wesley A. Ward	Three Chimneys Farm	1:49.28
2024	Paramount Prince	4	Patrick Husbands	Mark E. Casse	Michael J. Langlois and Gray Barber	1:49.35
2023	Tyson	4	Rafael Manuel Hernandez	Josie Carroll	Hill 'n' Dale Equine Holdings Inc. (J. G. Sikura) and Stretch Run Ventures LLC	1:48.32
2022	Frosted Over	4	Kazushi Kimura	Mark E. Casse	Gary Barber	1:49.46
2021	Mighty Heart	4	Daisuke Fukumoto	Josie Carroll	Lawrence Cordes	1:43.33
2019	Are You Kidding Me	9	Rafael Manuel Hernandez	Roger L. Attfield	Kirk/Bates/Riordan	2:04.28
2018	Tiz A Slam	4	Steven Ronald Bahen	Roger L. Attfield	Chiefswood Stable	2:03.11
2017	Melmich	6	Eurico Rosa da Silva	Kevin Attard	Chesney/Hoffman	2:03.48
2016	Melmich	5	Eurico Rosa da Silva	Kevin Attard	Chesney/Hoffman	2:04.06
2015	Red Rifle	5	Alan Garcia	Todd Pletcher	Twin Creeks Racing Stable	2:01.93
2014	Sky Captain	4	Patrick Husbands	Mark E. Casse	John C. Oxley	2:03.32
2013	Delegation	4	Luis Contreras	Mark E. Casse	Gary Barber	2:01.51
2012	Hunter's Bay	4	Emma-Jayne Wilson	Reade Baker	Stronach Stables	2:04.11
2011	Don Cavallo	4	Luis Contreras	Roger L. Attfield	Stronach Stables	2:03.47
2010	Hold Me Back	4	Tyler Pizarro	Bill Mott	WinStar Farm	2:03.65
2009	Marchfield	5	Patrick Husbands	Mark E. Casse	Melnyk Racing Stables	2:03.63
2008	Jiggs Coz	4	David Clark	Sid C. Attard	Jim Dandy Stable	2:04.99
2007	True Metropolitan	5	Todd Kabel	Terry Jordan	Bob Cheema	2:04.20
2006	Funny Cide	6	Richard Migliore	Barclay Tagg	Sackatoga Stable	2:02.41
2005	A Bit O'Gold	4	Jono Jones	Catherine Day Phillips	The Two Bit Racing Stable	2:07.55
2004	Mobil	4	Todd Kabel	Mike Keogh	Gus Schickedanz	2:03.34
2003	Phantom Light	4	Todd Kabel	Roger Attfield	Stronach Stables	2:01.15
2002	Bonus Pack	4	Jesus Castanon	Thomas F. Proctor	Glen Hill Farm	2:03.01
2001	A Fleet's Dancer	6	Richard Dos Ramos	Roger Attfield	Cam Allard	2:05.69
2000	The Fed	5	Na Somsanith	David R. Bell	R. F. & J. E. Shaw	2:04.41
1999	Mt. Sassafras	7	Richard Dos Ramos	Barbara J. Minshall	Minshall Farms	2:01.38
1998	Stephanotis	5	Mickey Walls	Barbara J. Minshall	Minshall Farms	2:03.30
1997	Firm Dancer	4	Todd Kabel	Mike Keogh	Gus Schickedanz	2:01.20
1996	Mt. Sassafras	4	Mickey Walls	Barbara J. Minshall	Minshall Farms	2:03.20
1995	Alybro	4	Dave Penna	Roger Attfield	Kinghaven Farms	2:04.10
1994	Pomeroon	4	Todd Kabel	Ross Armata	V. Polsinelli & J.Malawski	2:02.40
1993	Candid Cameron	6	George HoSang	Trevor Swan	J. D. Cameron	2:04.00
1992	Rainbows For Life	4	Jack Lauzon	Jim Day	Sam-Son Farm	2:02.20
1991	Candid Cameron	4	Dave Penna	Trevor Swan	J. D. Cameron	2:03.30
1990	Charlie Barley	4	Robin Platts	Grant Pearce	King Caledon Farm	2:03.10
1989	Mi Selecto	4	Lloyd Duffy	Gil Rowntree	Stronach Stables	2:02.40
1988	Palace March	4	Julie Krone	William I. Mott	Bertram R. Firestone	2:03.20
1987	Gold Alert	4	Pat Day	Alton H. Quanbeck	Mrs. J. A. McDougald	2:05.20
1986	Key to the Moon	5	Lloyd Duffy	Gil Rowntree	B. K. Y. Stable	2:04.10
1985	Let's Go Blue	4	Larry Attard	Janet Bedford	Jim Dandy Stable	2:03.00
1984	Norwick	5	Gary Stahlbaum	Michael Sedlacek	Stronach Stables	2:04.30
1983	Frost King	5	Robin Platts	Bill Marko	Ted Smith & Bill Marko	2:04.20
1982	Bejilla	5	Brian Swatuk	Jerry Lavigne	Paddockhurst Stable	1:50.10
1981	Glorious Song	5	Robin Platts	Gerry Belanger	F. Stronach & N.B. Hunt	1:48.00
1980	Glorious Song	4	John LeBlanc	Gerry Belanger	F. Stronach & N.B. Hunt	1:50.10
1979	Friuli	6	Fernando Toro	Tony Mattine	G. Caroli	1:51.20

== Earlier winners ==
- 1978 - Giboulee
- 1977 - Coverack
- 1976 - Big Destiny
- 1975 - Double Quill
- 1974 - Selari Spirit
- 1973 - Nice Dancer
- 1972 - Kennedy Road
- 1971 - Dance Act
- 1970 - Amber Orbit
- 1969 - Bye and Near
- 1968 - Bye and Near
- 1968 - Bright Monarch
- 1967 - Stevie B. Good
- 1966 - Victorian Era
- 1965 - E.Day
- 1964 - Vindent de Paul
- 1963 - Decidedly
- 1962 - Wise Command
- 1961 - Mooney
- 1960 - Anita's Son
- 1959 - Biscayne
- 1958 - Marshal Ney
- 1957 - Grand Canyon
- 1956 - Ace Marine
- 1955 - Sampan
- 1954 - Chain Reaction
- 1953 - Mr. Willie

== See also ==
- List of Canadian flat horse races
