= Display Stakes =

- Class: Listed stakes
- Location: Woodbine Racetrack; Toronto, Ontario
- Inaugurated: 1956
- Race type: Thoroughbred - Flat racing
- Website: www.woodbineentertainment.com/qct/default.asp

Race information
- Distance: 1 1/16 miles (8.5 furlongs)
- Surface: Synthetic "all weather" dirt
- Track: left-handed
- Qualification: Two-year-olds
- Weight: Allowances
- Purse: Can$125,250
- Bonuses: $25,000 Ontario-breds

The Display Stakes is a Thoroughbred horse race run annually at Woodbine Racetrack in Toronto, Ontario, Canada. Contested on a synthetic "all weather" surface over a distance of 7 furlongs, it is open to two-year-old horses. Having been raced during October, November, or early December throughout its history, the listed stakes race offers a purse of $125,250 CAD.

Inaugurated in 1956 at Toronto's Old Woodbine Race Course as a sprint race, it was named for American Walter J. Salmon's colt Display, winner of the 1926 Preakness Stakes and who frequently raced in Canada where he won a number of important races.

The Display stakes was run in two divisions in 1959. There was no race in 1993. Since inception, it has been contested at various distances:

- 6 furlongs: 1956 at Old Woodbine Race Course
- 7 furlongs: 1957–1958 at Old Woodbine Race Course, 2019 to present at Woodbine Racetrack
- 8 furlongs (1 mile): 1959-1960 Old Woodbine Race Course, 1977–1992 at Greenwood Raceway
- 8.5 furlongs (1 1/16 miles): 1969–1976 at Greenwood Raceway, 1994 to 2018 at Woodbine Racetrack
- 9 furlongs (1 1/8 miles): 1961–1963 at Old Woodbine Race Course
- 9.5 furlongs: 1964–1968 at Greenwood Raceway

== Records ==
Speed record: (Through 1998, times were recorded in fifths of a second. Since 1999 they are in hundredths of a second)

- 1:43.04 - Gigawatt (2002)

Most wins by an owner:

- 4 - Stafford Farms (1962, 1967, 1972, 1978)

Most wins by a jockey:

- 4 - Patrick Husbands (1999, 2002, 2005, 2010)
- 4 - Luis Contreras (2011, 2012, 2014, 2017)

Most wins by a trainer:

- 5 - Mark E. Casse (1999, 2002, 2005, 2016, 2018)

== Winners of the Display Stakes ==
Year	Winner	Jockey	Trainer	Owner	Time
2024	Thundering	Eswan Flores	Patrick Dixon	Dastur Racing	1:23.64
2018	Sir Winston	Jerome Lermyte	Mark Casse	Tracy Farmer	1:45.02
2017	Admiralty Pier	Luis Contreras	Barbara J. Minshall	Bruce Lunsford	1:44.52
2016	King and His Court	Gary Boulanger	Mark Casse	Wachtel Stable and Gary Barber	1:45.10
2015	Don't Be So Salty	Emma-Jayne Wilson	Gary C. Contessa	Platinum Seven/Guarino/Boutelle	1:43.60
2014	Glenville Gardens	Luis Contreras	Josie Carroll	Melnyk Racing Stables	1:45.45
2013	Josie Sea View	Emma-Jayne Wilson	Reade Baker	Brereton C. Jones	1:44.39
2012	Avie's Quality	Luis Contreras	Josie Carroll	Ivan Dalos	1:43.25
2011	Maritimer	Luis Contreras	Sid C. Attard	Norseman Racing Stable	1:43.58
2010	Tiz Blessed	Patrick Husbands	Chad Brown	G&M West	1:44.23
2009	Bear's Hard Ten	Eurico Rosa da Silva	Reade Baker	Bear Stables	1:44.39
2008	Patena	Robert Landry	Josie Carroll	J. & G. Sikura/D. Dilall	1:44.72
2007	Discreet Commander	Constant Montpellier	Arthur Silvera	David Rowbotham et al.	1:45.20
2006	Jiggs Coz	David Clark	Sid C. Attard	Jim Dandy Stable	1:45.90
2005	Seaside Retreat	Patrick Husbands	Mark E. Casse	William S. Farish, Jr.	1:43.90
2004	One Smooth Ride	Constant Montpellier	David Cotey	Dominion Bloodstock	1:47.92
2003	Judiths Wild Rush	Dino Luciani	Scott Fairlie	Tenenbaum Racing	1:43.59
2002	Gigawatt	Patrick Husbands	Mark E. Casse	Stonerside Stable	1:43.04
2001	Tails Of The Crypt	Jake Barton	John A. Ross	Jam Jar Racing Stables	1:44.62
2000	Brushing Bully	Emile Ramsammy	Tino Attard	Stronach Stables	1:44.34
1999	Precise End	Patrick Husbands	Mark E. Casse	Mockingbird Farm Inc.	1:47.30
1998	Taos	Ricky Griffith	Grant Pearce	Lynne Hindmarsh	1:47.80
1997	Promiscuous	Mickey Walls	Macdonald Benson	Augustin Stable	1:44.80
1996	Air Cool	Robin Platts	Thomas R. Bowden	Colebrook Farms	1:47.80
1995	Northernprospector	Lloyd Duffy	P. County	Rainbow Valley Farm	1:43.80
1994	One Lift	Laurie Gulas	John DiGiovanni	Derose/DiGiovanni	1:46.40
1993	no race				
1992	Bold Anthony	Robert King, Jr.	K. Sheehan	Pedigree Farm	1:41.20
1991	Judge Carson	Todd Kabel	Robert P. Tiller	G. J. Meyers	1:38.00
1990	Carey The Belle	Larry Attard	T. Danks	T. P. Campbell	1:38.40
1989	Briar Bush	Larry Attard	R. Wright	P. A. Sherwood	1:37.40
1988	With Approval	James McAleney	Roger Attfield	Kinghaven Farms	1:40.20
1987	Beau Genius	Richard Dos Ramos	Gerry Belanger	J. Shiewitz/D. Davidson	1:39.60
1986	Orderofexcellence	Dan Beckon	D. Lockhurst	A. Clarkson/ P. Barr	1:39.60
1985	Ice Over	Gunnar Lindberg	Sid C. Attard	Mrs. J. Raymond	1:40.00
1984	Corncobs Royalty	Irwin Driedger	James E. Day	Sam-Son Farm	1:38.80
1983	Key to the Moon	Robin Platts	Gil Rowntree	B. K. Y. Stable	1:40.80
1982	Gone to Royalty	Yves Turcotte	Jacques Dumas	Pierre-Louis Levesque	1:40.00
1981	Fraud Squad	Dan Beckon	Bill Marko	Seedhouse/McPhillips	1:41.00
1980	Regal Stafford	Hugo Dittfach	C. C. Hopmans, Jr.	Est. Conn Smythe	1:40.20
1979	Decent Davey	Robin Platts	David C. Cross Jr.	David J. Foster	1:39.00
1978	Cougar Kitten	Joey Belowus	Gil Rowntree	Stafford Farms	1:40.60
1977	High Roller	Dan Beckon	J. Lankinen	R. A. Kennedy/J. Indig	1:39.20
1976	Lucky North Man	Jeffrey Fell	Donnie Walker	Conn Smythe	1:45.80
1975	Bay Streak	David Clark	Gordon M. Huntley	Whittaker Stable	1:46.60
1974	Silverbatim	Jeffrey Fell	Gordon M. Huntley	Mutual Enterprises	1:45.60
1973	Obverse	Lloyd Duffy	Jerry C. Meyer	D. H. L. Buntain	1:47.20
1972	Selari Spirit	Ted Colangelo	Gil Rowntree	Stafford Farms	1:43.60
1971	Sky High's Son	Sandy Hawley	J. Mort Hardy	Prime Acres Stable	1:46.60
1970	Chatty Cavalier	R. Armstrong	Lou Cavalaris, Jr.	Gardiner Farm	1:43.80
1969	Taipo	Sandy Hawley	A. Chris	E. B. George	1:45.60
1968	Jumpin Joseph	Brian Swatuk	Robert S. Bateman	Warren Beasley	2:08.60
1967	Ovation	Hugo Dittfach	Gil Rowntree	Stafford Farms	2:04.00
1966	Green Stinger	Eric Walsh	P. Goddard	W. D. Hatch	1:58.00
1965	Garden's Ace	John LeBlanc	W. VonRichthofen	Garden City Stable	2:06.00
1964	Flyalong	Clifford Potts	Duke Campbell	T. Hays / D. Weldon	2:00.60
1963	French Wind	Hugo Dittfach	J. Sanchez	Windfields Farm	1:56.60
1962	Cesca	Harlon Dalton	John Passero	Stafford Farms	1:51.20
1961	Puss'n Boots	Chris Rogers	Frank Merrill, Jr.	R. & W. Gian	1:53.00
1960	Ramblin Wreck	Al Coy	Robert S. Bateman	William R. Beasley	1:39.20
1959	Naughty Flirt	Armand Viola	Edward Mann	Gardiner & Bell	1:39.20
1959	Hidden Treasure	C. M. Clark	John Passero	William R. Beasley	1:37.60
1958	Bull Vic	Al Coy	Yonnie Starr	Maloney & Smythe	1:25.80
1957	Drummond	Al Coy	Morris Fishman	H. Clifford Hatch	1:25.40
1956	Flying Atom	Alex Wick	C. W. Lawson	C. W. Lawson	1:12.00
