= Tudor Queen =

American-bred Thoroughbred racehorse

- Sire: King of the Tudors
- Grandsire: Tudor Minstrel
- Dam: Royal Dowry
- Damsire: Royal Charger
- Sex: Filly
- Foaled: 1967
- Country: Canada
- Colour: Chestnut
- Breeder: Mrs. A. G. Daniels
- Owner: Stafford Farms
- Trainer: Gil Rowntree
- Record: 42: 14-10-7
- Earnings: $224,674

Major wins
- Frizette Stakes (1969); Summer Stakes (1969); Clarendon Stakes (1969); Vandal Stakes (1969); My Dear Stakes (1969); Duchess Handicap (1970); Nettie Handicap (1971)

Awards
- TRA American Champion Two-Year-Old Filly (1969)

Honours
- Tudor Queen Stakes at Belmont Park

Tudor Queen (foaled 1967 in Kentucky) was a Champion Thoroughbred racehorse in Canada and the United States. In 1969 she was voted American Champion Two-Year-Old Filly by the Thoroughbred Racing Association.

== Background ==
Her British sire was King of the Tudors, a multiple stakes winner whose wins included the 1953 Sussex Stakes and 1954 Eclipse Stakes. Grandsire Tudor Minstrel won a British Classic, the 1947 2,000 Guineas Stakes. Tudor Queen's dam was Royal Dowry, a granddaughter of the great Nearco through his son, Royal Charger.

Purchased by Jack Stafford, owner of Stafford Farms in King, Ontario, Tudor Queen was conditioned for racing by future Canadian Horse Racing Hall of Fame inductee Gil Rowntree who was based at Woodbine Racetrack in Toronto, Ontario, Canada.

== Racing career ==
As a two-year-old the filly had her best year in racing, winning four important stakes races in Canada and the Frizette Stakes at Belmont Park in Elmont, New York. At year's end, she was voted the 1969 American Champion Two-Year-Old Filly by the Thoroughbred Racing Association, with Fast Attack topping the rival Daily Racing Form poll. The award made her the de facto Canadian Two Year-Old Champion in the pre-Sovereign Award era.

Tudor Queen raced at age three and four, notably winning the 1970 Duchess Handicap at her home base and the following year, the Nettie Handicap.

== Breeding record ==
After she was retired to broodmare duty, Tudor Queen's offspring met with limited racing success.

== Pedigree ==
Pedigree of Tudor Queen
Sire King of the Tudors	Tudor Minstrel	Owen Tudor	Hyperion
Sire King of the Tudors	Tudor Minstrel	Owen Tudor	Mary Tudor
Sire King of the Tudors	Tudor Minstrel	Sansonnet	Sansovino
Sire King of the Tudors	Tudor Minstrel	Sansonnet	Lady Juror
Sire King of the Tudors	Glen Line	Blue Peter	Fairway
Sire King of the Tudors	Glen Line	Blue Peter	Fancy Free
Sire King of the Tudors	Glen Line	Scotia's Glen	Beresford
Sire King of the Tudors	Glen Line	Scotia's Glen	Queen Scotia
Dam Royal Dowry	Royal Charger	Nearco	Pharos
Dam Royal Dowry	Royal Charger	Nearco	Nogara
Dam Royal Dowry	Royal Charger	Sun Princess	Solario
Dam Royal Dowry	Royal Charger	Sun Princess	Mumtaz Begum
Dam Royal Dowry	Querida	Alibhai	Hyperion
Dam Royal Dowry	Querida	Alibhai	Teresina
Dam Royal Dowry	Querida	Durazna	Bull Lea
Dam Royal Dowry	Querida	Durazna	Myrtlewood
