= Gil Rowntree =

Canadian horse trainer (1934–2026)

Personal information
- Born: January 17, 1934 Toronto, Ontario, Canada
- Died: May 24, 2026 (aged 92) Welland, Ontario, Canada
- Occupation: Trainer

Horse racing career
- Sport: Horse racing
- Career wins: 1,036

Major racing wins
- Display Stakes (1967, 1972, 1978, 1983); Maple Leaf Stakes (1968); Clarendon Stakes (1969, 1983, 1985); Frizette Stakes (1969); Summer Stakes (1969, 1975, 1976, 1981); Vandal Stakes (1969, 1975, 1978, 1990); Plate Trial Stakes (1970, 1973, 1974, 1975, 1976, 1978, 1984); Grey Stakes (1971, 1983); E. P. Taylor Stakes (1971); Cup and Saucer Stakes (1972, 1975, 1979, 1991); Seaway Handicap (1973, 1979); Eclipse Stakes (1974, 1975, 1977, 1979, 1980, 1986); Queenston Stakes (1974, 1975, 1977, 1990); Victoria Stakes (1974, 1975, 1976, 1985); Nearctic Stakes (1975); Seagram Cup Handicap (1975, 1994); Connaught Cup Stakes (1975, 1976, 1978, 1979, 1980); Highlander Handicap (1976); Swynford Stakes (1976, 1978); Whimsical Stakes (1976, 1979); Wonder Where Stakes (1976, 1977, 1983); Coronation Futurity Stakes (1977, 1979); Carling O'Keefe Invitational Handicap (1978); Manitoba Derby (1978, 1984); Stars and Stripes Handicap (1979); Bernard Baruch Handicap (1979); Canadian Maturity Stakes (1979); Bowling Green Handicap (1979); Col. R. S. McLaughlin Handicap (1979, 1980, 1984); Jockey Club Cup Handicap (1980, 1981); Toronto Cup Stakes (1980); Canadian Derby (1982); Autumn Stakes (1984); Durham Cup Stakes (1985, 1986); Dominion Day Stakes (1986, 1989); Meadowlands Breeders' Cup Stakes (1989) Canadian Triple Crown series: Queen's Plate (1973, 1974, 1977, 1984); Prince of Wales Stakes (1973, 1978, 1980); Breeders' Stakes (1978)

Racing awards
- Sovereign Award for Outstanding Trainer (1975)

Honours
- Canadian Horse Racing Hall of Fame (1997)

Significant horses
- Allan Blue, Amber Herod, Deceit Dancer, Key to the Moon, Mi Selecto, Northern Blossom, Overskate, Proud Tobin, Royal Chocolate, Sound Reason, Ten Gold Pots, Tudor Queen

Gilmore Harry Rowntree (January 17, 1934 – May 24, 2026) was a Canadian Hall of Fame Thoroughbred racehorse trainer and owner.

== Life and career ==
Rowntrewe was born on January 17, 1934, in Toronto. One of the most successful trainers in Canadian Thoroughbred racing history, Rowntree embarked on his racing career as a jockey in his native Toronto, riding from 1949 through 1951. As a trainer, he learned his conditioning skills as an assistant to Hall of Fame trainer and Kentucky Derby winner, Lou Cavalaris, Jr. Rowntree obtained his trainer's licence in 1959 and was hired by Stafford Farms in 1967 where he remained until the death of owner Jack Stafford in 1981.

During his training career, Rowntree won eight Canadian Classic Races and following the creation of the Sovereign Awards program in 1975 he was voted the first-ever winner as Canada's Outstanding Trainer.

In 1973, Rowntree set a record when horses he trained ran 1-2-3 in the Prince of Wales Stakes, the second leg of the Canadian Triple Crown series. Although Rowntree won four editions of Canada's most prestigious race, the Queen's Plate, he is best known as the trainer of the 1978 Queen's Plate runner-up, Overskate. The Hall of Fame colt was twice voted Canadian Horse of the Year as part of his record-setting nine Sovereign Awards while competing in Canada and at various tracks in the United States. As well, Rowntree conditioned Canadian champions Deceit Dancer, Proud Tobin, Northern Blossom, Ten Gold Pots, Allan Blue, Key to the Moon, Sound Reason and Tudor Queen, the 1969 American Champion Two-Year-Old Filly, and in the pre-Sovereign Award era, the de facto Canadian Two-Year-Old Champion.

Rowntree made his home near Woodbine Racetrack in Etobicoke, Ontario and continued to train Thoroughbreds for various owners plus breed, race and train horses for his own Gil Rowntree Racing Stable.

Rowntree died in Welland, Ontario from non-Hodgkin lymphoma on May 24, 2026, at the age of 92.

== Sources ==
- Gil Rowntree at the Canadian Horse Racing Hall of Fame
