= Vandal Stakes =

- Class: Discontinued Stakes
- Location: Woodbine Racetrack; Toronto, Ontario
- Inaugurated: 1956
- Race type: Thoroughbred - Flat racing
- Website: woodbineentertainment.com

Race information
- Distance: 6.5 furlongs
- Surface: Turf
- Track: Left-handed
- Qualification: Two-Year-Olds, bred in Ontario
- Weight: Allowances
- Purse: CAN$150,000

The Vandal Stakes was a Canadian Thoroughbred horse race run annually from 1956 through 2016 at Woodbine Racetrack in Toronto, Ontario. The race has been on hiatus since the 2016 edition. The sprint race was open to two-year-old horses bred in Ontario. In 2016, the distance was changed to 6 1/2 furlongs and the surface was changed to turf. It currently offers a purse of $150,000.

The Vandal Stakes was hosted by Fort Erie Racetrack from 1970 through 1985. In 1961, it was run in two divisions. Since inception in 1956 the race has been run at various distances:

- 5 furlongs : 2006
- 5.5 furlongs : 1956–1957, 1959, 1967
- 6 furlongs : 1958, 1960, 1968-1969 1986–2005, 2007–2015
- 6.5 furlongs : 1962–1966, 1970–1985, 2016
- 7 furlongs : 1961

Prior to 2016, the race was held on the main track, which was a Polytrack synthetic dirt surface from 2006 to 2015 and a natural dirt surface before then. As of 2016, the race is held on the turf.

== Historical race notes ==
The great Northern Dancer finished second in the 1963 running of the Vandal Stakes but went on to win the following years Kentucky Derby. 1967 winner Dancer's Image also went on to win the Derby.

== Records ==
Speed record: (At current distance of six furlongs)

- 1:09.64 - Ghost Fleet (2009)

Most wins by a jockey:

- 9 - David Clark (1982, 1987, 1991, 1996, 2001, 2003, 2005, 2007, 2008)

Most wins by a trainer:

- 4 - Gil Rowntree (1969, 1975, 1978, 1990)

Most wins by an owner:

- 3 - Stafford Farms (1969, 1975, 1978)

== Winners ==
Year	Winner	Jockey	Trainer	Owner	Time
2016	Channel Maker	Luis Contreras	Daniel Vella	Joey Gee Thoroughbreds	1:17.50
2015	Ruth Less Blue	Michelle Rainford	Scott Fairlie	Rijack Farm & Ace Racing Stable	1:10.71
2014	Imperial Dream	Patrick Husbands	Nicholas Gonzalez Jr.	Tucci Stables (Lou & Carlo Tucci)	1:09.58
2013	Go Greeley	Eurico Rosa Da Silva	John A. Ross	J.R. Racing Stable Inc.	1:10.33
2012	Uncaptured	Patrick Husbands	Mark Casse	John C. Oxley	1:10.37
2011	Buongiorno Johnny	Tyler Pizarro	Sid C. Attard	Norseman Racing Stable	1:10.27
2010	Sensational Slam	Patrick Husbands	Todd Pletcher	Bobby Flay	1:11.21
2009	Ghost Fleet	Todd Kabel	Sid C. Attard	Jim Dandy Stable	1:09.64
2008	Win and Reign	David Clark	Nicholas Gonzalez	Hillsbrook Farms	1:10.88
2007	Stuck In Traffic	David Clark	Nicholas Gonzalez	M.A.D. Racing Stables & Martha Gonzalez	1:10.01
2006	Leonnatus Anteas	Jono Jones	Kevin Attard	Knob Hill Stable	0:59.86
2005	Edenwold	David Clark	Josie Carroll	Jim & Alice Sapara	1:10.29
2004	Moonshine Justice	Todd Kabel	David Cotey	D. Cotey, D. Ball, H. Galbraith	1:12.73
2003	Twisted Wit	David Clark	Robert P. Tiller	Rolph Davis	1:13.37
2002	Wando	Richard Dos Ramos	Michael Keogh	Gus Shickedanz	1:11.90
2001	Rare Friends	David Clark	Robert P. Tiller	F. DiGiulio Jr. & R. P. Tiller	1:11.66
2000	San Mont Andreas	Tyrone Harding	Desmond Maynard	Ronald P. Christman	1:12.12
1999	Swampster	Robert Landry	Roger Attfield	Attfield & Libeau Jr.	1:11.23
1998	Catahoula Parish	Ray Sabourin	John A. Ross	Jam Jar Racing Stable	1:11.60
1997	Nite Dreamer	Emile Ramsammy	Bill Marko	Marcello Stables, J.B.S. Racing Stable, Frank Stronach	1:10.60
1996	Air Cool	David Clark	Thomas R. Bowden	Colebrook Farms (John Bmjas)	1:11.20
1995	Heavenly Valley	Todd Kabel	Daniel J. Vella	Frank Stronach	1:12.60
1994	Tethra	Dave Penna	Michael J. Doyle	Eaton Hall Farm	1:11.20
1993	Welbred Fred	Dave Penna	Glenn Magnusson	David B. Seyler	1:11.80
1992	Dancing Deputy	Don Seymour	Michael P. DePaulo	Peter DaCosta	1:11.20
1991	Marious	David Clark	Michael J. Doyle	Eaton Hall Farm	1:12.40
1990	Waheed	Larry Attard	Gil Rowntree	B. K. Y. Stable	1:12.00
1989	Ever Steady	Don Seymour	Roger Attfield	Kinghaven Farms	1:10.20
1988	Harry Laric	Robert King, Jr.	Daniel O'Callaghan	Hi-Lo Acres	1:11.60
1987	Highland Ruckus	David Clark	Tony Mattine	Linmac Farm	1:11.40
1986	Fozzie Bear	Larry Attard	Tino Attard	V. C. L. Farms/Spatafora	1:11.60
1985	Fred C. Dobbs	Jeffrey Fell	George Nemett	Whispering Hills / Green	1:18.60
1984	Pre Emptive Strike	Robin Platts	Arthur H. Warner	R. R. Kennedy & B. J. Cullen	1:17.20
1983	Archregent	Hugo Dittfach	Arthur H. Warner	Richard R. Kennedy	1:17.80
1982	Haliburton Huskie	David Clark	Glenn Magnusson	G. Vasey & Partner	1:19.00
1981	Son of Briartic	Larry Attard	Jerry G. Lavigne	Paddockhurst Stable	1:20.20
1980	Moteral	John Bell	Emile M. Allain	Langill/O’Connor/Willcocks	1:18.60
1979	Corvette Chris	Lloyd Duffy	Gerry Belanger	Edward B. Seedhouse	1:18.40
1978	Port Master	Robin Platts	Gil Rowntree	Stafford Farm	1:19.60
1977	Tikvah	Avelino Gomez	John Bakos	Mr. & Mrs. S. Shapiro	1:19.20
1976	Swain	Gary Stahlbaum	James C. Bentley	Windfields Farm	1:20.00
1975	Ambassador, B.	Robin Platts	Gil Rowntree	Stafford Farms	1:19.00
1974	Colonel's Clarion	Jeffrey Fell	Nester Danysh	Ernest Lieberman	1:21.20
1973	Trojan Bronze	Robin Platts	Glenn Magnusson	A. B. Roks	1:17.80
1972	Happy Chant	Robin Platts	Frank Merrill Jr.	Roxie & N. Gian	1:19.80
1971	Gentleman Conn	Sandy Hawley	Jerry C. Meyer	Willow Downs Farm (Saul Wagman)	1:18.00
1970	Hook It Up	Sandy Hawley	Douglas M. Davis Jr.	Wolkin & Cooperman	1:16.80
1969	Tudor Queen	Robin Platts	Gil Rowntree	Stafford Farms	1:12.20
1968	Viceregal	Richard Grubb	Gordon J. McCann	Windfields Farm	1:10.60
1967	Dancer's Image	Richard Grubb	Lou Cavalaris, Jr.	Peter D. Fuller	1:05.40
1966	Pine Point	Avelino Gomez	Jerry C. Meyer	Willow Downs Farm	1:17.60
1965	Stevie B. Good	Nick Shuk	B. Puccini	E. C. Pasquale	1:18.80
1964	Good Old Mort	Keith Robinson	Jerry C. Meyer	Edward B. Seedhouse	1:19.40
1963	Ramblin Road	Ron Turcotte	Gordon M. Huntley	Gordon F. Hall	1:19.00
1962	Sea Service	Harlon Dalton	Alfred I. Taylor	D. G. Ross	1:18.80
1961	Princess Davelle	Harlon Dalton	Douglas M. Davis Jr.	Mrs. G. Holtsinger	1:29.60
1961	Wilcock	Harlon Dalton	Douglas M. Davis Jr.	P. Shawn	1:33.40
1960	Jammed Lucky	Al Coy	Yonnie Starr	Conn Smythe	1:12.40
1959	Men at Play	Al Coy	Yonnie Starr	C. Smythe & L. Maloney	1:05.80
1958	Rapid Break	Eugene Rodriguez	Gordon M. Huntley	Gordon F. Hall	1:13.20
1957	Lady Yolande	Chris Rogers	Frank Seremba	Yolande Seremba	1:06.20
1956	Myanna	Vic Bovine	Richard Townrow	Shermanor Farm	1:07.40
