= Viceregal (horse) =

Canadian-bred Thoroughbred racehorse

- Sire: Northern Dancer
- Grandsire: Nearctic
- Dam: Victoria Regina
- Damsire: Menetrier
- Sex: Stallion
- Foaled: April 4, 1966
- Country: Canada
- Colour: Chestnut
- Breeder: E. P. Taylor
- Owner: Windfields Farm
- Trainer: Gordon J. McCann
- Record: 9: 8-0-1
- Earnings: $118,399

Major wins
- Victoria Stakes (1968); Vandal Stakes (1968); Colin Stakes (1968); Summer Stakes (1968); Clarendon Stakes (1968); Coronation Futurity Stakes (1968); Cup and Saucer Stakes (1968)

Awards
- Canadian Champion 2-Year-Old colt (1968); Canadian Horse of the Year (1968)

Viceregal (April 4, 1966 – April 29, 1984) was a Canadian Champion Thoroughbred racehorse who was voted Canadian Horse of the Year as a two-year-old.

== Background ==
Bred and raced by E. P. Taylor and his Windfields Farm, he was a first-crop son of the great Northern Dancer and out of the Windfields-owned mare, Victoria Regina. Viceregal was conditioned for racing by Gordon J. "Pete" McCann.

== Racing career ==
He was sent to race at age two in 1968, and although the colt suffered from soundness problems, he nonetheless won all eight of his starts and won Canadian Horse of the Year honors. Popular with racing fans because of his come-from-behind style, of his eight wins, seven were stakes races including the two most important races for juveniles in Canada, the Coronation Futurity Stakes and the Cup and Saucer Stakes.

Targeted towards the 1969 Kentucky Derby, Viceregal was sent to race in the United States but on his first start in a minor race at Lexington he pulled up injured after finishing third. It was discovered that he had broken a bone in a forefoot thereby ending his racing career.

== Stud record ==
Retired to stud, Viceregal stood at Windfields Farm in Ontario as well as at breeding operations in Germany, France and Japan. In all, he sired thirty-five stakes race winners and is the damsire of the 1987 Prix de l'Arc de Triomphe winner, Trempolino.

== Pedigree ==
Pedigree of Viceregal, chestnut stallion, April 4, 1966
Sire Northern Dancer	Nearctic	Nearco	Pharos
Sire Northern Dancer	Nearctic	Nearco	Nogara
Sire Northern Dancer	Nearctic	Lady Angela	Hyperion
Sire Northern Dancer	Nearctic	Lady Angela	Sister Sarah
Sire Northern Dancer	Natalma	Native Dancer	Polynesian
Sire Northern Dancer	Natalma	Native Dancer	Geisha
Sire Northern Dancer	Natalma	Almahmoud	Mahmoud
Sire Northern Dancer	Natalma	Almahmoud	Arbitrator
Dam Victoria Regina	Menetrier	Fair Copy	Fairway
Dam Victoria Regina	Menetrier	Fair Copy	Composure
Dam Victoria Regina	Menetrier	La Melodie	Gold Bridge
Dam Victoria Regina	Menetrier	La Melodie	La Souriciere
Dam Victoria Regina	Victoriana	Windfields	Bunty Lawless
Dam Victoria Regina	Victoriana	Windfields	Nandi
Dam Victoria Regina	Victoriana	Iribelle	Osiris
Dam Victoria Regina	Victoriana	Iribelle	Belmona (family: 10-c)
