= Northern Dancer =

Canadian-bred Thoroughbred racehorse

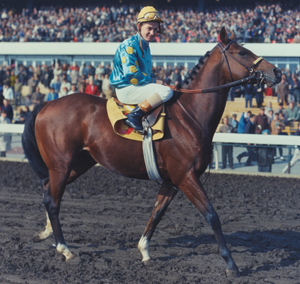
- Sire: Nearctic
- Grandsire: Nearco
- Dam: Natalma
- Damsire: Native Dancer
- Sex: Stallion
- Foaled: May 27, 1961; Oshawa, Ontario, Canada
- Died: November 16, 1990 (aged 29); Chesapeake City, Maryland, U.S.
- Country: Canada
- Colour: Bay
- Breeder: Edward P. Taylor
- Owner: Windfields Farm; Colors: Turquoise, gold dots on sleeves, gold cap
- Trainer: Horatio Luro
- Rider: Bill Hartack
- Record: 18: 14–2–2
- Earnings: US$580,647 (Note: The precise earnings total depends on the conversion rate used for the Canadian dollar. Some sources show a total of $580,806. Equibase shows $580,647.)

Major wins
- Summer Stakes (1963); Coronation Futurity Stakes (1963); Remsen Stakes (1963); Flamingo Stakes (1964); Florida Derby (1964); Blue Grass Stakes (1964) Canadian Classics wins: Queen's Plate (1964) American Classics wins: Kentucky Derby (1964); Preakness Stakes (1964)

Awards
- U.S. Champion 3-Yr-Old Colt (1964); Canadian Horse of the Year (1964); Canadian Champion Two-Year-Old (1963); Canadian Champion Three-Year-Old (1964); Leading sire in North America (1971, 1977 (Note: The leading sire title for 1977 was given to Dr. Fager by the Thoroughbred Daily Times as at the time they counted North American earnings only. Northern Dancer was given the title by The Blood-Horse as they also included international earnings.)); Leading broodmare sire in North America (1991); Leading sire in Great Britain and Ireland (1970, 1977, 1983, 1984)

Honours
- Canada's Sports Hall of Fame (1965); Canadian Horse Racing Hall of Fame (1976); United States Racing Hall of Fame (1976); Canadian postage stamp (1999); Northern Dancer Blvd. in Toronto, Ontario; Northern Dancer Lane in Aurora ON; Northern Dancer Dr. in Warwick, Maryland; Life-size statue at Woodbine Racetrack; Northern Dancer Turf Stakes at Woodbine

Northern Dancer (May 27, 1961 – November 16, 1990) was a Thoroughbred that, in 1964, became the first Canadian-bred horse to win the Kentucky Derby. After being retired from racing, he became one of the most successful sires of the 20th century. He is considered a Canadian icon and was inducted into the Canadian Sports Hall of Fame in 1965. Induction into the Racing Hall of Fame in both Canada and the United States followed in 1976. As a competitor, The Blood-Horse ranked him as one of the top 100 U.S. Thoroughbred racehorses of the 20th century. As a sire of sires, his influence on the breed is still felt worldwide.

At age two, Northern Dancer was named the Canadian Champion Two-Year-Old Colt after winning both the Summer Stakes and Coronation Futurity in Canada, plus the Remsen Stakes in New York. At three, he became a leading contender for the Kentucky Derby with wins in the Flamingo Stakes, Florida Derby, and Blue Grass Stakes. Northern Dancer followed up a record-setting victory in the Kentucky Derby by winning the Preakness Stakes. With a chance at the American Triple Crown, he finished third in the Belmont Stakes. Returning to Canada for a hero's welcome, he won the Queen's Plate in what proved to be his last race.

Northern Dancer was retired to stud in 1965 at Windfields Farm in Oshawa, Ontario, Canada. He was an immediate success when his first crop reached racing age in 1968. The success of his second crop, led by English Triple Crown winner Nijinsky, gave him international renown. Northern Dancer was relocated to the Maryland branch of Windfields Farm, where he became the most sought sire of his time.

== Background ==
Northern Dancer was a bay stallion with a crooked white blaze and three white socks. He was bred in Oshawa, Ontario, by Canadian business magnate Edward P. Taylor, owner of Windfields Farm. He was from the first crop of Nearctic and the first foal out of the mare Natalma, whose sire was Native Dancer.

All Thoroughbreds in the Northern Hemisphere have an official birth date of January 1 but Northern Dancer was foaled late in the season, on May 27, 1961. Younger than most of his age cohort, he was only 14 hands (56 inches, 142 cm) high (Note: The average height for a Thoroughbred, measured at the withers, is about 16 hands (64 inches)) when Windfields Farm offered all of its yearlings for sale at its annual auction. Thus, despite a strong pedigree and good conformation, Northern Dancer did not find a buyer at his Can$25,000 reserve price. As a result, Northern Dancer stayed in the Windfields Farm racing stable.

At maturity, Northern Dancer had powerful hindquarters along with excellent balance and agility. His stallion listings showed his height as 15.2 hands (62 inches, 157 cm), but most horsemen who had met him estimated his adult height as between 15 hands (60 inches, 152 cm) and 15.1 hands (61 inches, 155 cm). Shortly before the Kentucky Derby at age three, he weighed 940 pounds (430 kg). Like his sire Nearctic and grandsire Nearco before him, Northern Dancer had a dominant and sometimes unruly temperament. "He wasn't mean, but he would wheel and do some tricks", said Joe Thomas, who later managed the horse's stud career. Trainer Horatio Luro originally wanted to geld the colt because "he was feisty", but Taylor refused.

Referring to the horse's diminutive stature, sportswriter Jim Murray of the Los Angeles Times wrote: "Northern Dancer is the kind of colt who, if you saw him in your living room, you'd send for a trap and put cheese in it. He's so little, a cat would chase him. But he's so plucky there's barely room in him for his heart. His legs are barely long enough to keep his tail off the ground. He probably takes a hundred more strides than anyone else, but he's harder to pass than a third martini."

== Racing career ==
=== 1963: Two-year-old season ===
On August 2, 1963, Northern Dancer made his debut at Fort Erie Race Track in a maiden race for Canadian foaled two-year-olds over a distance of 5 1/2 furlongs. He was ridden by apprentice jockey Ron Turcotte, who was instructed not to use the whip but gave the colt a tap at the sixteenth pole anyway, whereupon Northern Dancer "exploded". He beat seven horses for a purse of $2,100. Turcotte later recalled, "We won that race by eight lengths. He was a bold horse. Brave. He could handle anything. The grass. The mud. Anything."

Wearing blinkers for the first time, Northern Dancer made his next start on August 17 in the Vandal Stakes. Paul Bohenko was his jockey since Turcotte was committed to another horse, Ramblin' Man. Northern Dancer entered into a speed duel at the start of the race, setting up the race for Ramblin' Man to come from behind and win. After the race, Turcotte is quoted as having told Luro, "the Dancer was definitely the best two year old in Canada, maybe in the world." He next entered the Summer Stakes on August 24, then at a distance of 1 mile on the turf at Fort Erie. The track condition was described as 'bog-like', and Northern Dancer is said to have almost fallen. Despite struggling with the ground, he led from the start and hung on for the win.

After a brief layoff, Northern Dancer was entered in the 1 1/16 mile Cup and Saucer Stakes on September 28 over the Woodbine turf course, where he was assigned the top weight of 124 pounds. Ron Turcotte was back as his jockey and took him to an early lead, but Northern Dancer tired and fell second to long-shot Grand Garcon by three-quarters of a length. Turcotte believed the horse had still not recovered from the effort in the Summer Stakes and was favouring his left foreleg. "He kept wanting to bear left, and I couldn't get him on his right lead at all."

On October 7, he returned in the Bloordale Purse at 1 mile and 70 yards where he was again the top weight at 122 pounds. His main rival Northern Flight carried 117 pounds while other horses carried as little as 112 pounds. Northern Dancer broke well but allowed Northern Flight to take a commanding lead. At the halfway mark, Northern Dancer was third on the rail, 15 lengths back, but gradually closed the gap on the far turn. Down the stretch, the two battled for the lead before Northern Dancer pulled away to win by 1 1/2 lengths, with the rest of the field some twenty-five plus lengths behind Northern Flight. Five days later, Northern Dancer faced a field of 14 rivals in the Coronation Futurity Stakes, the richest race for Canadian two-year-olds. He settled in fourth at the start, then took over the lead at the halfway point, drawing away to win by 6 1/4 lengths. It was Turcotte's last ride on Northern Dancer, as Luro feared he could not maintain sufficient control of the headstrong colt. "God knows how good [Northern Dancer] really was," recalled Turcotte, "for he was never a completely sound horse most of the time I rode him, and I still could not slow him down more than that."

On November 6, Northern Dancer followed up with a win in the seven-furlong Carleton Stakes at Greenwood on a muddy track. He won by 2 1/2 lengths, but the Daily Racing Form called him an "unwilling winner", reflecting heavy pressure from new jockey Jimmy Fitzsimmons, who used the whip throughout the stretch drive. Northern Dancer came back to the barn bleeding from the beginning of a quarter crack. It was thought that the injury was a result of his heavy race schedule – seven races in three months. Nonetheless, the colt was shipped to Aqueduct Racetrack in New York to compete against American horses. On November 18, he was entered in the Sir Gaylord Purse. He was ridden by Manuel Ycaza, and won by eight lengths over Bupers, who had won the Belmont Futurity. However, the quarter crack became more pronounced, so he was fitted with a bar shoe on his left front hoof to stabilize the foot.

On November 27, Northern Dancer was the odds-on favourite in a field of six horses entered in the Remsen Stakes, despite carrying top weight of 124 pounds. Ycaza sent him to the lead early and he won by two lengths in wire-to-wire fashion. His time of 1:35 3/5 for one mile was a new stakes record. Ycaza later recalled him as an "ideal horse for any kind of situation. He would do anything you asked."

His record of seven wins from nine starts earned Northern Dancer the Canadian Juvenile Championship. He was rated at 126 pounds in the Canadian Free Handicap for two-year-olds, five pounds above Ramblin Road. In the American Experimental Free Handicap, he was rated at 123 pounds – three pounds below champion Raise a Native. (Note: The Experimental Free Handicaps were an early version of the World's Best Racehorse Rankings. The numbers were assigned by a Jockey Club committee, with the highest numbers going to the most accomplished horses.)

=== 1964: Three-year-old season ===
After the Remsen, Luro gave Northern Dancer some time off to heal and had a vulcanized rubber patch applied to the quarter crack. Northern Dancer recovered quickly and reentered training in January. His first race at three was on February 10, 1964, in a six-furlong prep at Hialeah Park under a new jockey, Bobby Ussery, who was instructed to take it easy and not use the whip. Northern Dancer was bumped at the start and fell to the back of the pack. He recovered and steadily advanced up the rail, only to become trapped behind several horses. He was bumped again and eventually finished third behind Chieftain. Despite the instructions of Luro, Ussery had taken to his whip in the final strides of the race, which led the trainer to publicly criticize the rider. "I believe in being very patient with my horses," said Luro. "I don't want punishment – under no circumstances."

On February 24, Northern Dancer and Chieftain again faced each other in a public workout over seven furlongs at Hialeah. Northern Dancer broke slowly but soon took the lead and won by seven lengths in a time of 1:23 2/5. He continued to gallop out past the wire, completing one mile in 1:36 2/5 and nine furlongs in 1:50 4/5. For his next start in the Flamingo Stakes on March 3, Northern Dancer was ridden by Hall of Fame jockey Bill Shoemaker and went off as the even-money favourite in a field of eleven. He settled into second and moved to the lead in the stretch after some gentle urging by Shoemaker, winning by two lengths over Mr. Brick, with Quadrangle a further eight lengths back in third. His time of 1:47 4/5 was the second fastest in the history of the race, behind only Bold Ruler's time of 1:47 flat. Shoemaker was pleased with the performance. "My little horse got a little leg weary in the last sixteenth of a mile," he said, "but that was natural. He wasn't quite so seasoned as some of the other horses."

He then entered a seven-furlong allowance race at Gulfstream Park on March 28 as a prep for the Florida Derby. Shoemaker was unable to ride due to a previous commitment, so Ycaza got the ride. Northern Dancer won easily by four lengths, equaling the track record of 1:22 2/5. In the Florida Derby on April 4, Northern Dancer was the 3–10 favourite in a field of eight. With Shoemaker back up, Northern Dancer raced in mid-pack behind a slow pace, then started to make up ground on the rail. Shoemaker waited until the half mile pole then urged the colt on without using the whip. Northern Dancer quickly took the lead at the head of the stretch and then held off a challenge by The Scoundrel, eventually winning by a length. Shoemaker said later that the colt was improving. However, his time was a disappointing 1:50 4/5, the slowest Florida Derby since 1955. Joe Hirsch of the Daily Racing Form commented, "It did not appear that Shoemaker had a lot of horse left at the wire." Luro was satisfied with the performance though, feeling that the slow time of the race was the result of a fast workout a few days earlier in which Northern Dancer had fought restraint by the exercise rider.

Shortly after the race, Luro asked Shoemaker to commit to riding Northern Dancer in the Kentucky Derby. But Shoemaker instead chose Hill Rise, who had won the San Felipe Stakes and the Santa Anita Derby in California. Shoemaker had never ridden Hill Rise but campaigned hard to get the mount, believing the colt represented his best chance for a Derby win. Ycaza was also unable to commit to Northern Dancer as another trainer had first call on his services. Ultimately, Luro settled on Bill Hartack, who had ridden Luro's previous Kentucky Derby winner, Decidedly. "I'm not upset about it at all," said Luro. "I guess Shoemaker must not have been impressed with my horse's race Saturday, but I believe it was far from his best effort."

With his new jockey, Northern Dancer was made the 1–5 favourite in a field of five in the Blue Grass Stakes at Keeneland on April 23. With Northern Dancer so heavily backed, only win betting was allowed. Northern Dancer rated in second behind a slow early pace until the head of the stretch when he coasted to the lead. Another horse, Allen Adair, made a run down the stretch so Hartack released his grip and Northern Dancer crossed the finish line in front by half a length. He completed the nine furlongs in a time of 1:49 4/5 and galloped out the Derby distance of ten furlongs in 2:03. Hartack was satisfied with the colt's abilities. "He is a small horse," said Hartack, "but he has lots of brawn and lots of guts."

==== Bidding for the Triple Crown ====
For the 1964 Kentucky Derby, run at a distance of 1 1/4 miles, Northern Dancer drew post position 7 in a field of 12. He was the second betting choice at odds of 7–2 behind Hill Rise at 7–5. In the high pressure environment leading up to the race, Luro kept the press away from the colt, even substituting a stable pony for Northern Dancer during photo sessions. Northern Dancer responded by training eagerly, with a final workout of 1:00 2/5 on April 20. On the day of the race, May 2, Northern Dancer was on edge. As the field reached the track, he "bounced like a rubber ball" and gave a huge buck when the band started to play "My Old Kentucky Home". He settled during the warm up, only to balk when asked to enter the starting gate. After a few tense moments, Northern Dancer relaxed and loaded quietly. After the break, he settled into good position on the rail around the first turn behind the early pacemakers Mr. Brick and Royal. Down the backstretch, Hartack guided him through a narrow hole into the clear and started to make up ground on the leaders. He got the jump on Hill Rise, who became tangled up in traffic as the front-runners started to fade. With a quarter mile to go, Hartack urged his colt on; Northern Dancer responded by running the next furlong in a very fast 11 seconds. He had a lead of about two lengths, but Hill Rise had gotten in the clear and started to make up ground. Author Kevin Chong later wrote of Northern Dancer's "short, powerful legs making like a hummingbird's wings" as he ran down the stretch. Hill Rise closed with giant strides, but Northern Dancer prevailed by a neck in a new race record of two minutes flat that stood until Secretariat broke it in 1973. He became the first Canadian-bred horse to win the Kentucky Derby, making front-page headlines across Canada.

Hartack, known for a somewhat adversarial relationship with the press, was full of praise after the race. "[Northern Dancer] is a game, hard trying little horse," he said. "He was always in good position and he ran real strong on the turns. He really did some running from the quarter pole to the eighth pole, and he was running his gamest at the wire." With the Preakness Stakes being run just two weeks later, Luro was concerned that Northern Dancer would find the race more demanding, especially because the track at Pimlico was deep and taxing. Accordingly, he used long gallops of between two and three miles to build up stamina. Then on the Friday before the race, he "blew out" Northern Dancer with a 3-furlong workout in a brisk :35 3/5 to sharpen his speed.

For the Preakness on May 16, Northern Dancer went off as the 2–1 second favourite to Hill Rise in a field of six that included the top five finishers from the Derby plus Quadrangle. Northern Dancer settled into third place with Hill Rise tracking just behind. Quadrangle moved to the lead down the backstretch and Northern Dancer started to make his move around the far turn. Hartack had yet to ask Northern Dancer for his run, while the jockeys of both Hill Rise and Quadrangle were working hard to maintain their position. Turning into the stretch, Hartack hit Northern Dancer once and he surged to a commanding lead. Near the finish line, Northern Dancer started to tire but Hartack was not overly worried. "If he was tired, the horses behind us would be even more tired," he explained. Northern Dancer won by two and a half lengths. Hill Rise finished third, caught at the wire by The Scoundrel who claimed second.

Northern Dancer celebrated his actual third birthday on May 27 and was presented with a cake of carrots adorned by Canadian flags. He also received hundreds of cards wishing him success in the upcoming Belmont Stakes. Taylor felt that the horse would not mind the distance of 12 furlongs, believing that Hartack would be able to judge the pace and conserve energy. Luro was more worried, believing that Northern Dancer's best distance was between eight and nine furlongs, but hoped the horse's class would be enough to carry him the extra distance.

With a Triple Crown at stake, a then-record crowd of 61,215 showed up for the Belmont Stakes on June 6, run that year at Aqueduct due to renovations at Belmont Park. Northern Dancer went off as the 4–5 favourite in a field of eight, with Hill Rise the second choice at 2–1 and Quadrangle at 13–2. With Northern Dancer under a tight hold, he and Hill Rise tracked each other for the first mile behind a slow pace set by outsider Orientalist. Quadrangle was in second, relaxed and saving ground with excellent position on the rail. After a mile in 1:39 1/5, Quadrangle's jockey, Manuel Ycaza, made his move, confident his horse had enough stamina to outlast the others. Hartack on Northern Dancer and Shoemaker on Hill Rise appeared to underestimate Quadrangle and did not at first respond, allowing Quadrangle to build a substantial lead into the stretch. When finally asked to run, Northern Dancer closed the gap to within half a length in midstretch. However, he then tired and was passed by Roman Brother to finish third, some six lengths behind the winner. Bill Shoemaker on Hill Rise, who finished fourth, lodged an objection against Hartack for being squeezed off on the final turn but the stewards disallowed the claim. The time of 2:28 2/5 was just two-fifths of a second off the track record. Hartack said he had been worried about several horses, including Quadrangle, before the race and felt the distance was the decisive factor. Asked if he felt disappointed by the result, he replied, "How can it be a disappointment when a horse runs his heart out for you? He certainly didn't disgrace himself – not to me, anyway."

==== Return to Canada ====
In spite of the loss in the Belmont, the mayor of Toronto declared June 8, 1964, to be "Northern Dancer Day", which included a ceremony held at city hall. (The idea of a ticker-tape parade down Bay Street was nixed due to the colt's high-strung temperament.) E. P. Taylor was presented with a key to the city—carved out of a carrot. Taylor presented the key to Northern Dancer when the horse arrived at Woodbine a few days later; the colt promptly ate it.

On June 25, Northern Dancer was the heavy betting favourite in the Queen's Plate at odds of 1–7 in a field of eight. He raced from well off the pace, trailing the field around the first turn and still in sixth down the backstretch. Hartack relaxed his hold entering the far turn, and Northern Dancer "zoomed" past the early leaders, then drew off to win by 7 1/2 lengths. Hartack never needed the whip. Northern Dancer completed the race in 2:02 1/5, which, although more than two seconds off his time in the Kentucky Derby, was just one-fifth of a second off the race record set by Victoria Park in 1960. "My main concern was with the first turn," said Luro after the race. "You see, we were in the No. 1 post position, and it could have been tough to get around other horses at the turn." Accordingly, Hartack had restrained Northern Dancer at the start to avoid traffic problems. However, the colt's poor position made Hartack move sooner than he would have preferred. Despite the easy win, Hartack felt the colt had been somewhat "dull", and possibly unsound.

Northern Dancer remains the only Kentucky Derby winner to also take the Queen's Plate.

==== Aftermath ====
Northern Dancer pulled up lame after a workout at Belmont in July. According to Luro, Northern Dancer had run with a splint on the inside of his left front leg since age two but had never before shown visible evidence of injury. The earlier symptoms of lameness noticed by Turcotte and Hartack had only manifested at full racing speed. Assistant trainer Norman Bowles later said the horse "would probably run through anything – he was a tough little man – and you never can tell when one of those things may start stinging. This time, he had developed a bowed tendon. It did not respond to treatment, and this ended his racing career.

Northern Dancer was named the Champion Three-Year-Old Colt of 1964 in the United States. He was also named the three-year-old champion in Canada and Canadian Horse of the Year. (Note: For the Canadian awards in 1964, a requirement that a horse do its "best racing" in Canada was waived for Northern Dancer. He would not have been eligible under current rules either, which require three starts in Canada) In addition, he was named Canadian Athlete of the Year. He was the high weight at 128 pounds on the Daily Racing Form's American Free Handicap for three-year-olds, one pound above both Roman Brother and Quadrangle. He was also the high weight at 132 pounds on the Canadian Free Handicap, 12 pounds more than Langcrest.

In his two-year racing career, Northern Dancer won 14 of his 18 starts and never finished worse than third. His earnings totaled $580,000, then a record for a Canadian-bred horse. In The Blood-Horse listing of the top 100 American Thoroughbred racehorses of the 20th century, he was ranked number 43.

== Statistics ==
Date	Age	Distance	Race	Track	Odds	Time	Field	Finish	Margin	Jockey	Ref
Aug 2, 1963	2	5 1/2 furlongs	Maiden	Fort Erie Race Track	0.95*	1:06 1/5	8	1	6 3/4 lengths	Ron Turcotte	
August 17, 1963	2	6 1/2 furlongs	Vandal Stakes	Fort Erie Race Track	6.55	1:19	11	2	(4 lengths)	Paul Bohenko	
August 24, 1963	2	1 mile (turf)	Summer Stakes	Fort Erie Race Track	1.65*	1:43 2/5	7	1	1 1/4 lengths	Paul Bohenko	
September 28, 1963	2	1 1/16 mile (turf)	Cup and Saucer Stakes	Woodbine Racetrack	1.60*	1:45 3/5	16	2	(3/4 lengths)	Ron Turcotte	
October 7, 1963	2	1 mile and 70 yards	Bloordale Purse (allowance)	Woodbine Racetrack	0.45*	1:42	6	1	1 length	Ron Turcotte	
October 12, 1963	2	1 1/8 miles	Coronation Futurity Stakes	Woodbine Racetrack	1.00*	1:51	15	1	6 1/4 lengths	Ron Turcotte	
November 6, 1963	2	7 furlongs	Carleton Stakes	Greenwood Raceway	0.30*	1:27 3/5	6	1	2 1/2 lengths	Jim Fitzsimmons	
November 18, 1963	2	1 mile	Sir Gaylord Purse (allowance)	Aqueduct Racetrack	2.60	1:36	6	1	8 lengths	Manuel Ycaza	
November 27, 1963	2	1 mile	Remsen Stakes	Aqueduct Racetrack	0.25*	1:35 3/5 (Note: New stakes record)	6	1	2 lengths	Manuel Ycaza	
February 10, 1964	3	6 furlongs	Allowance	Hialeah Park	1.40	1:10 2/5	7	3	(2 lengths)	Bobby Ussery	
March 3, 1964	3	1 1/8 miles	Flamingo Stakes	Hialeah Park	1.00*	1:47 4/5	11	1	2 lengths	Bill Shoemaker	
March 28, 1964	3	7 furlongs	Allowance	Gulfstream Park	0.40*	1:22 2/5 (Note: Tied track record)	7	1	4 lengths	Manuel Ycaza	
April 4, 1964	3	1 1/8 miles	Florida Derby	Gulfstream Park	0.30*	1:50 4/5	8	1	1 length	Bill Shoemaker	
April 23, 1964	3	1 1/8 miles	Blue Grass Stakes	Keeneland Race Course	0.20*	1:49 4/5	5	1	1/2 length	Bill Hartack	
May 2, 1964	3	1 1/4 miles	Kentucky Derby	Churchill Downs	3.40	2:00 (Note: New track record)	12	1	Neck	Bill Hartack	
May 16, 1964	3	1 3/16 miles	Preakness Stakes	Pimlico Race Course	2.10	1:56 4/5	6	1	2 1/4 lengths	Bill Hartack	
June 6, 1964	3	1 1/2 miles	Belmont Stakes	Aqueduct Racetrack (Note: The Belmont Stakes was run at Aqueduct in 1964 because of renovations to the grandstand at Belmont Park)	0.80*	2:28 2/5	8	3	(6 lengths)	Bill Hartack	
June 20, 1964	3	1 1/4 miles	Queen's Plate	Woodbine Racetrack	0.15*	2:02 1/5	8	1	7 1/2 lengths	Bill Hartack	

An asterisk after the odds means Northern Dancer was the post-time favourite.

Conversion of race distances
Furlongs	Miles	Meters
5 1/2	11/16	1,106
6	3/4	1,207
6 1/2	13/16	1,308
7	7/8	1,408
8	1	1,609
8 1/2	1 1/16	1,710
9	1 1/8	1,811
9 1/2	1 3/16	1,911
10	1 1/4	2,012
12	1 1/2	2,414

== Breeding career ==
Northern Dancer retired to stud in 1965 at Taylor's Windfields Farm in Oshawa, Ontario, for an initial fee of $10,000. Due to his small size, a ramp was built in the breeding shed to allow Northern Dancer to service mares who were taller than him. He was bred to 35 mares, with 21 live foals being produced in 1966. The first crop reached racing age in 1968 and were an immediate success, including Viceregal, who was named Canadian Horse of the Year. Nine others also became stakes winners, an "astounding" 47.6% of the crop. "His first foals ran so well," said Ed Bowen, former editor of The Blood-Horse. "Northern Dancer had that aura about him right away."

Although his second crop produced only four stakes winners, it played a crucial role in his developing reputation. His leading performer was Nijinsky, who was purchased by Irish trainer Vincent O'Brien at the Canadian yearling sale for $84,000. Nijinsky went on to win the 1970 English Triple Crown, the first horse to do so since 1935. Nijinsky was named Horse of the Year in England and Ireland. Meanwhile, Fanfreluche was named Canadian Horse of the Year and co-champion three year-old-filly in both Canada and the United States.

As the result of his success, Northern Dancer was relocated to the Maryland division of Windfields Farm in December 1968 and was syndicated in August 1970 for $2.4 million. Taylor retained several shares in the stallion, while other members included Claiborne Farm, Allaire du Pont, Greentree Stud, J. Louis Levesque, Paul Mellon, Spendthrift Farm, Tartan Farm and Alfred G. Vanderbilt. Each share in the syndicate provided an annual breeding right to Northern Dancer, and relatively few other breeding rights were publicly available. As a result of the scarcity of his services and his continued success, Northern Dancer's stud fee rose, slowly at first: from $10,000 (live foal) in 1965, to $15,000 (live foal) in 1969, to $25,000 (live foal) in 1971 to $35,000 ($10,000 of which was non-refundable) in 1975 to $50,000 (no guarantee) in 1978. His published fee, with no guarantee that a live foal would result, then started a rapid increase: $100,000 in 1980, $150,000 in 1981, $250,000 in 1982, $300,000 in 1983 and $500,000 in 1984. For his final years at stud (1985–1987), his breeding rights were privately negotiated, with one season selling at auction for $1 million, an amount four to five times that of his closest rivals. By contrast, the highest North American stud fee in 2016 was $300,000 for Tapit.

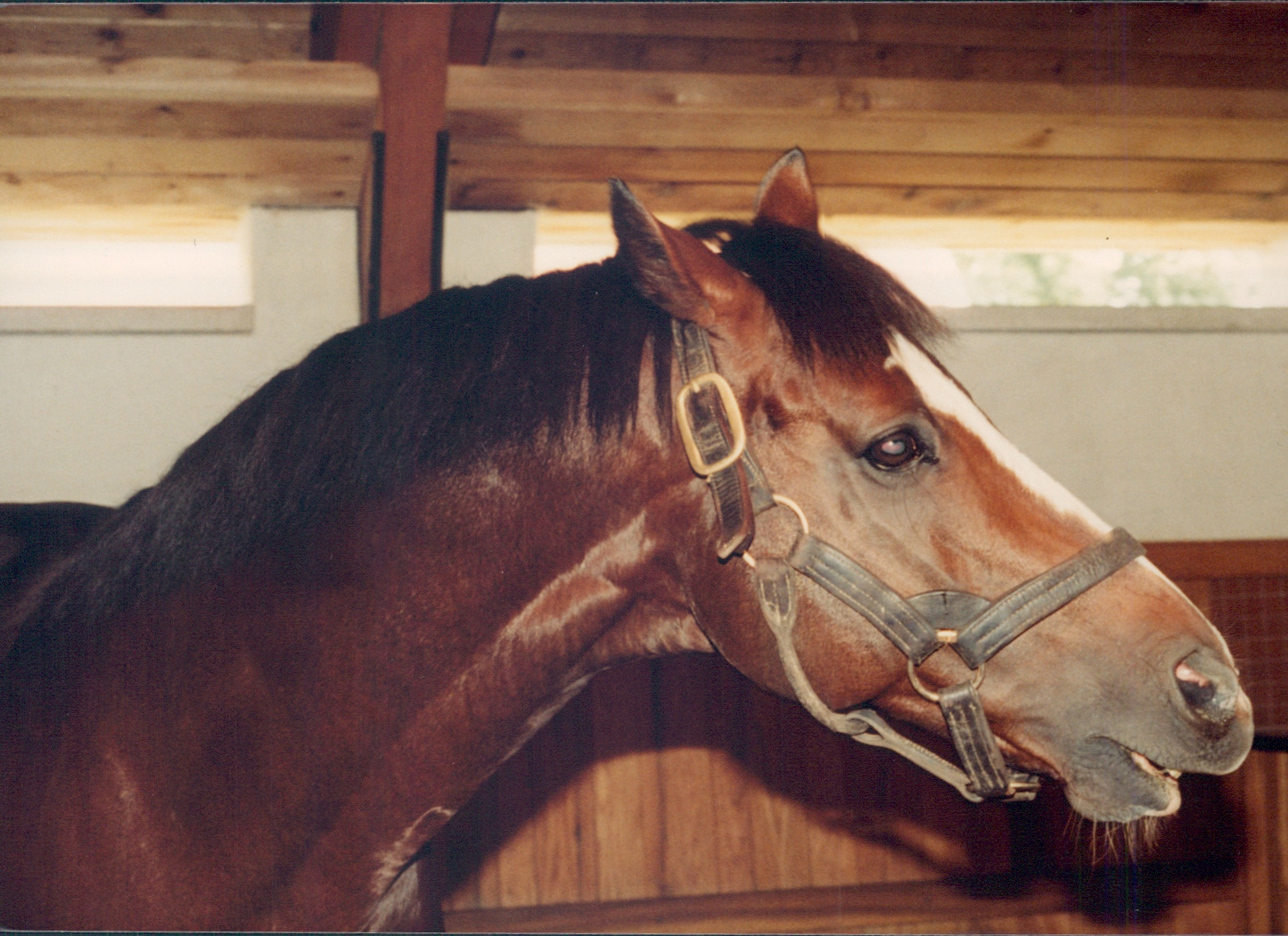
Lyphard resembled his sire closely.

Northern Dancer was one of the 20th century's most successful Thoroughbred sires. From 645 named foals, he sired 411 winners (63.7%) and 147 stakes winners (22.8%). The 147 stakes winners was then a record. He was the 1971 leading sire in North America and also in 1977 when international earnings are included. His progeny were highly sought in Europe, and he became the leading sire in Great Britain and Ireland in 1970, 1978, 1983, and 1984. Most of his progeny resembled him in size and shape: Nijinsky, who stood over 16 hands (64 inches, 163 cm), proved the exception. They were also generally known for their balance and acceleration.

When Northern Dancer was 20 years old (an advanced age for a stallion), his owners turned down an offer of US$40 million from a European syndicate for him. Northern Dancer's entry into stud service was ranked number 28 in "Horse Racing's Top 100 Moments", a 2006 review of American racing in the 20th century by The Blood-Horse magazine.

=== Notable progeny ===
Northern Dancer's major stakes winners include:

c = colt, f = filly, g = gelding

Foaled	Name	Sex	Major Wins
1966	Cool Mood	f	Canadian Oaks. second dam of With Approval and Touch Gold
1966	Dance Act	g	Canadian champion handicap horse (1970, 1971) – Jockey Club Cup, Dominion Day Handicap, Fair Play Stakes, Seagram Cup
1966	One for All	c	Canadian champion turf horse (1970) – Sunset Handicap, Pan American Handicap, Canadian International
1966	Viceregal	c	Canadian Horse of the Year (1968) – Coronation Futurity, Cup and Saucer Stakes, Summer Stakes
1967	Fanfreluche	f	Canadian Horse of the Year (1970) – Alabama Stakes, Natalma Stakes, Bison City Stakes
1967	Nijinsky	c	English Horse of the Year (1970) – English Triple Crown, King George VI and Queen Elizabeth Stakes, Irish Derby, Dewhurst Stakes
1968	Alma North	f	Cotillion Stakes, Matchmaker Handicap
1968	Lauries Dancer	f	Canadian Horse of the Year (1971) – Alabama Stakes, Delaware Oaks, Canadian Oaks, Bison City Stakes
1968	Minsky	c	Irish champion 2yo colt (1970) – Beresford Stakes, Railway Stakes
1969	Lyphard	c	Prix Jacques Le Marois, Prix de la Forêt
1969	Nice Dancer	c	Canadian champion 3yo colt (1972) – Breeders' Stakes, Manitoba Derby
1971	Northern Taste	c	Prix de la Forêt
1972	Broadway Dancer	f	French champion 2yo filly (1974) – Prix Morny
1972	Dancers Countess	f	Matchmaker Stakes
1974	Dance in Time	c	Canadian champion 3yo colt (1977) – Prince of Wales Stakes, Breeders' Stakes
1974	Giboulee	c	Canadian champion older horse (1978) – Dominion Day Handicap, Virgil Handicap
1974	Northernette	f	Canadian champion filly at two (1976) and three (1977) – Mazarine Stakes, Canadian Oaks, Selene Stakes, Apple Blossom Handicap, Top Flight Handicap
1974	The Minstrel	c	English Horse of the Year (1977) – Epsom Derby, Irish Derby, King George VI and Queen Elizabeth Stakes, Dewhurst Stakes
1975	Try My Best	c	English and Irish champion 2yo colt (1977) – Dewhurst Stakes
1975	White Star Line	f	Kentucky Oaks, Delaware Oaks, Alabama Stakes
1976	Northern Baby	c	Champion Stakes
1977	Nureyev	c	French champion miler (1980) – Prix Djebel. Finished first in 2000 Guineas but was disqualified
1978	Storm Bird	c	Champion 2yo colt in England and Ireland (1980) – Dewhurst Stakes, National Stakes
1979	Dance Number	f	Beldame Stakes. dam of champion Rhythm
1979	Woodstream	f	Irish champion 2yo filly (1981) – Moyglare Stud Stakes, Cheveley Park Stakes
1980	Danzatore	c	Irish champion 2yo colt (1982) – Beresford Stakes
1980	Hero's Honor	c	Bowling Green Handicap, United Nations Handicap
1980	Lomond	c	2000 Guineas
1980	Shareef Dancer	c	Champion 3yo colt in England and Ireland (1983) – Irish Derby
1980	Spit Curl	f	Alabama Stakes
1981	El Gran Senor	c	English champion colt at two (1983) and three (1984) – 2000 Guineas, Irish Derby, Dewhurst Stakes, National Stakes
1981	Northern Trick	f	French champion 3yo filly (1984) – Prix de Diane, Prix Vermeille
1981	Sadler's Wells	c	French champion miler (1984) – Irish 2000 Guineas, Eclipse Stakes, Irish Champion Stakes
1981	Secreto	c	Irish champion colt (1984) – Epsom Derby
1982	Northern Aspen	f	Gamely Handicap
1983	Tate Gallery	c	National Stakes
1984	Ajdal	c	Champion sprinter in England and France (1987) – Dewhurst Stakes, July Cup, William Hill Sprint Championship, Vernons Sprint Cup

=== Sales records ===
Former Keeneland chairman Ted Bassett wrote in his autobiography that between 1974 and 1988, the sons and daughters of Northern Dancer fetched the highest prices of all sires at the yearling sales 12 times, "and that constitutes a record that may last forever." Northern Dancer's yearlings also led the Keeneland July Selected Yearling Sale by average price 12 times in the same period. In 1984, 12 yearlings by Northern Dancer sold for an unrivaled sale-record average price of US$3,446,666 (about $10.7 million adjusted for inflation). Combined over a period of 22 years, the top 174 Northern Dancer offspring at the Keeneland Sales sold for a total $160 million. The bidding duels between John Magnier and Robert Sangster of Coolmore Stud and Sheikh Mohammed bin Rashid Al Maktoum of Darley Stud helped drive up the prices as both sought future breeding prospects.

Three of the most expensive colts ever sold at public auction were sired by Northern Dancer: Snaafi Dancer, who became the first $10-million yearling when sold to Sheikh Mohammed for $10.2 million in 1983; a colt out of Ballade later named Imperial Falcon, who sold for $8.25 million to Sangster in 1984; and a colt out of Fabuleux Jane later named Jareer, who sold for $7.1 million to Darley Stud. Although none of these three colts was a major winner on the racetrack, the success of other high-priced yearlings like Shareef Dancer (auctioned for $3.3 million), Nureyev (auctioned for $1.3 million) and Lomond (privately sold for 1.5 million) kept demand high.

== End of life and burial ==
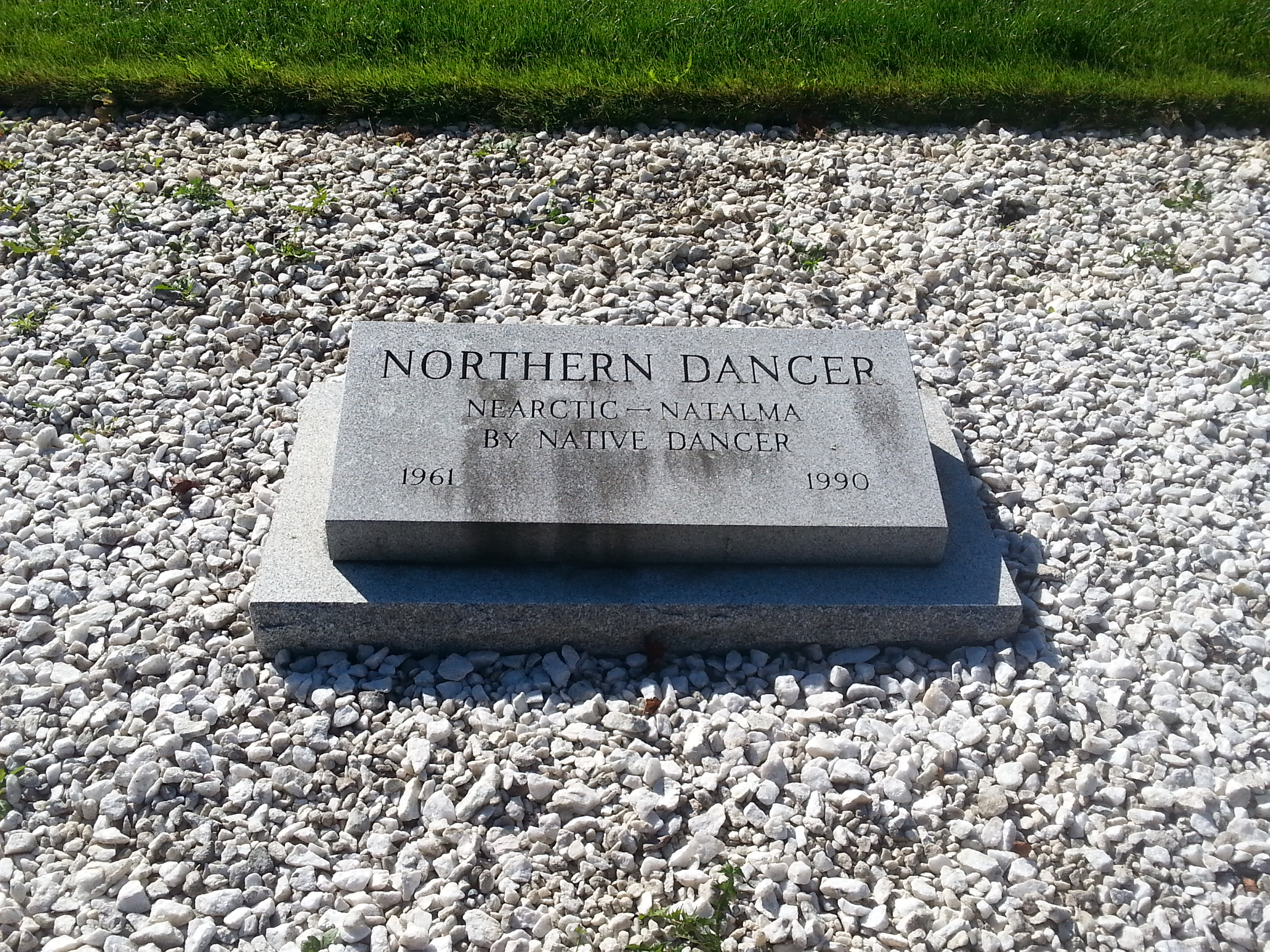
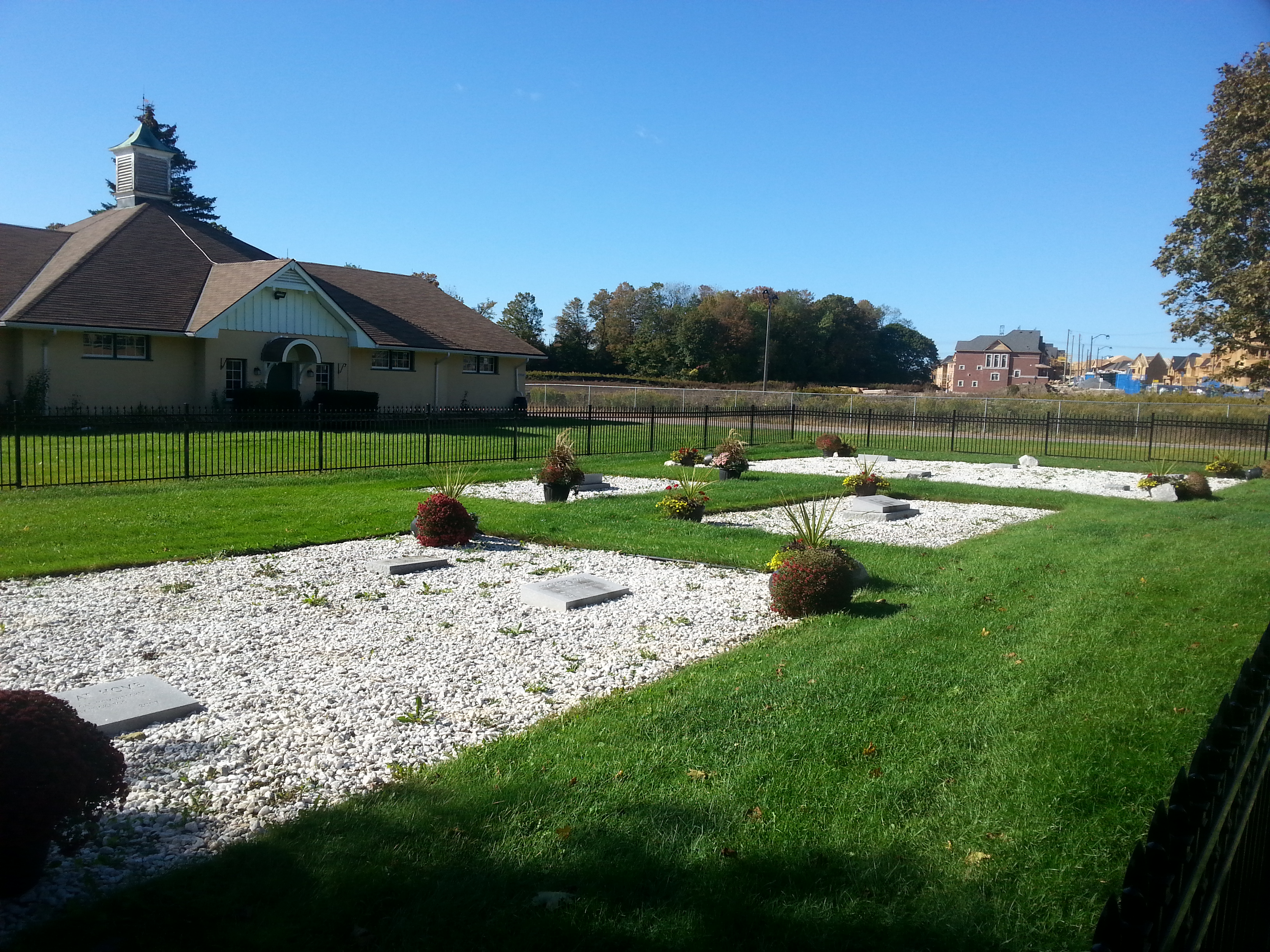
Northern Dancer's grave in the main cemetery at Windfields Farm

Northern Dancer was retired from stud on April 15, 1987, having started to experience heart problems and arthritis. He was pensioned at Windfields Farm in Maryland and when the farm was subsequently sold, a special clause was written to guarantee his lifelong right to live there. On November 15, 1990, at the age of 29, he suffered a severe colic, possibly complicated by a strangulation of his small intestine. Due to his advanced age, it was felt that Northern Dancer would be unable to survive surgery so he was euthanized on November 16. He was loaded in a specially built oak coffin and then wrapped in a blanket he had won during his racing career. That same day, his remains were brought back to Canada in a refrigerated van for burial at Windfields Farm in Oshawa, Ontario.

Windfields Farm was subsequently sold to the University of Ontario Institute of Technology (now Ontario Tech University) and Durham College, and Northern Dancer's burial site was not publicly accessible for many years, at one point becoming covered in weeds. On April 16, 2018, the grave became an official heritage site under the Ontario Heritage Act, with funds presented by the City of Oshawa to landscape the surrounding area.

== Legacy and honours ==
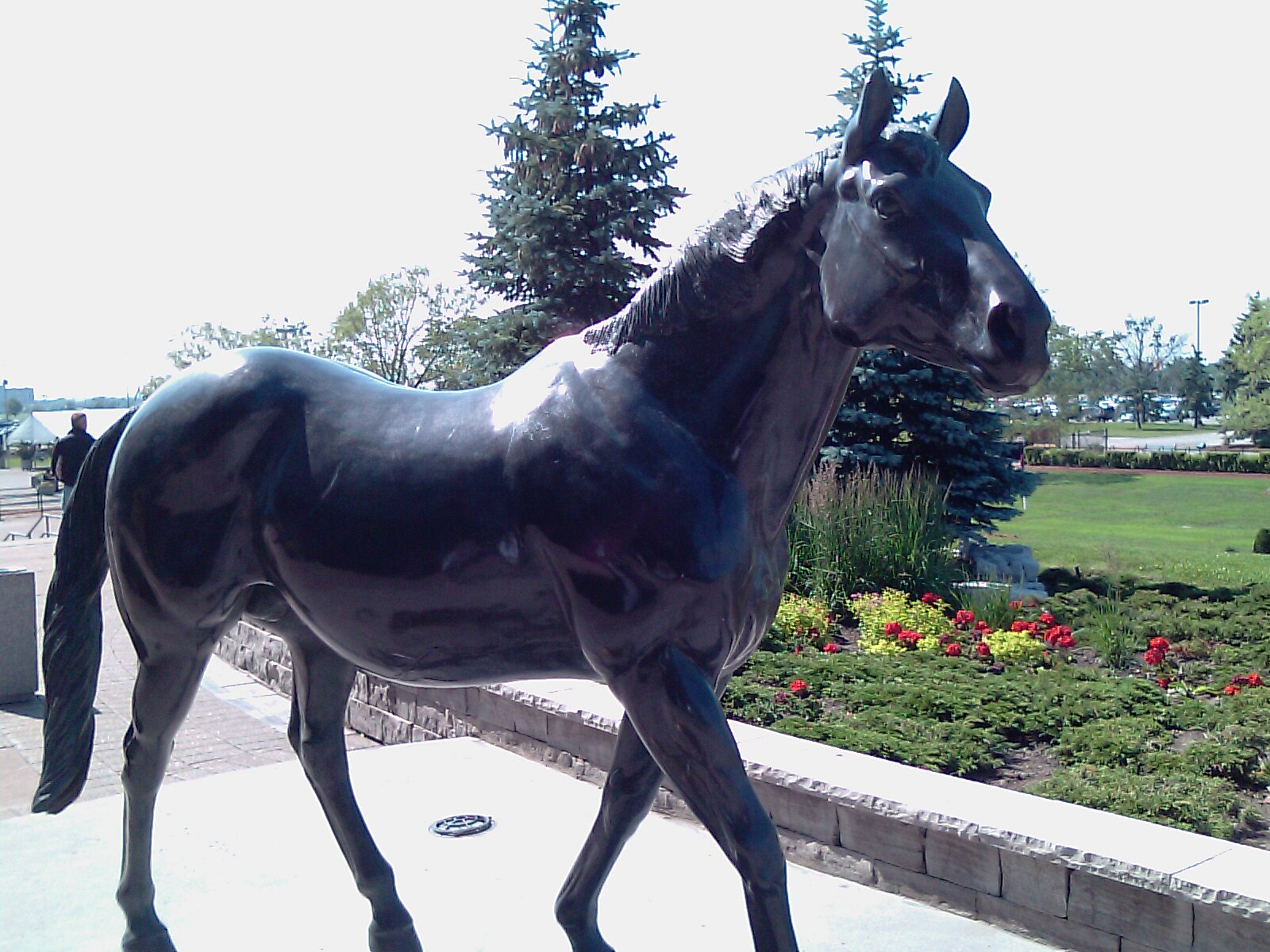
Statue of Northern Dancer at Woodbine Racetrack

In 1964, Northern Dancer was the American Champion Three-Year-Old Male Horse and the Canadian Horse of the Year. In 1965, he became the first horse voted into Canada's Sports Hall of Fame. In 1976, Northern Dancer was an inaugural inductee to the new Canadian Horse Racing Hall of Fame and was also inducted into the United States Horse Racing Hall of Fame. In 1977, Northern Dancer won three world sires' premiership titles for the number of international stakes winners, international stakes wins, and total stake earnings of his progeny.

Northern Dancer was inducted into the Ontario Sports Hall of Fame in 1998. In 1999, Canada Post honoured the horse with his image placed on a postage stamp. A residential street was named after Northern Dancer on the former site of the Greenwood Race Track in east-end Toronto. Also, a life-sized bronze statue of the horse was placed outside Woodbine Racetrack.

Over the decades, a number of books have been written about Northern Dancer. In 1995, Muriel Lennox, who had worked for Taylor, published Northern Dancer: The Legend and His Legacy. In 2003, Avalyn Hunter's book American Classic Pedigrees (1914–2002), extensively covered the influence of Northern Dancer on North America classic winners around the end of the 20th century. Her later book, The Kingmaker: How Northern Dancer Founded a Racing Dynasty covers Northern Dancer's international legacy. In 2015, Kevin Chong wrote Northern Dancer: The Legendary Horse That Inspired A Nation.

In 2011, the Canadian Horse Racing Hall of Fame held an induction ceremony that included a 50th-anniversary tribute for Northern Dancer. Saxophone instrumentalist Matthew James performed his tribute song, entitled "Northern Dancer". In 2012, Breyer Animal Creations released a portrait model of Northern Dancer sculpted by Jeanne Mellin Herrick. In 2014, the Canadian Film Centre unveiled the Northern Dancer Pavilion on its Windfields Farms heritage campus. In 2018, the city of Oshawa announced that a new elementary school, located near what used to be Windfields Farm at the corner of Northern Dancer Drive and Bridle Road, would be named after the horse. Northern Dancer's Kentucky Derby trophy is on permanent exhibit at the Canadian Museum of History in Gatineau, Québec.

=== Sire of sires ===
In 1990, The New York Times called Northern Dancer "the dominant progenitor of his breed" because his own success at stud was amplified by the impact of his sons around the world. His leading sire sons included:

- Be My Guest – leading sire in Great Britain and Ireland (1982)
- Danzig – leading sire in North America (1991–1993). also a sire of sires, including Danehill, leading sire in both Europe and Australia and Green Desert, whose sire son's include Invincible Spirit, Oasis Dream and Cape Cross
- Dixieland Band – sire of 117 stakes winners and damsire of two Kentucky Derby winners (Monarchos and Street Sense)
- El Gran Senor – sire of 55 stakes winners, also an important broodmare sire
- Fairy King – leading sire in France 1986. also a sire of sires, including Encosta de Lago in Australia
- Lyphard – led the French sire list in 1978 and 1979, American sire list in 1986, also an outstanding broodmare sire
- Nijinsky – led the English sire list in 1986, when he placed second in North America as well. leading American broodmare sire in 1993 and 1994. sire of sires including Caerleon
- Northern Taste – ten-time leading sire in Japan, also a leading broodmare sire
- Nureyev – led the French sire list in 1987, also a leading broodmare sire
- Sadler's Wells – leading sire in Great Britain and Ireland a record fourteen times. sire of 12 English Classics winners. also a sire of sires, including Galileo.
- Storm Bird – sire of 62 stakes winners, including leading American sire Storm Cat
- Vice Regent – led the Canadian sire list thirteen times. sire of leading American sire Deputy Minister

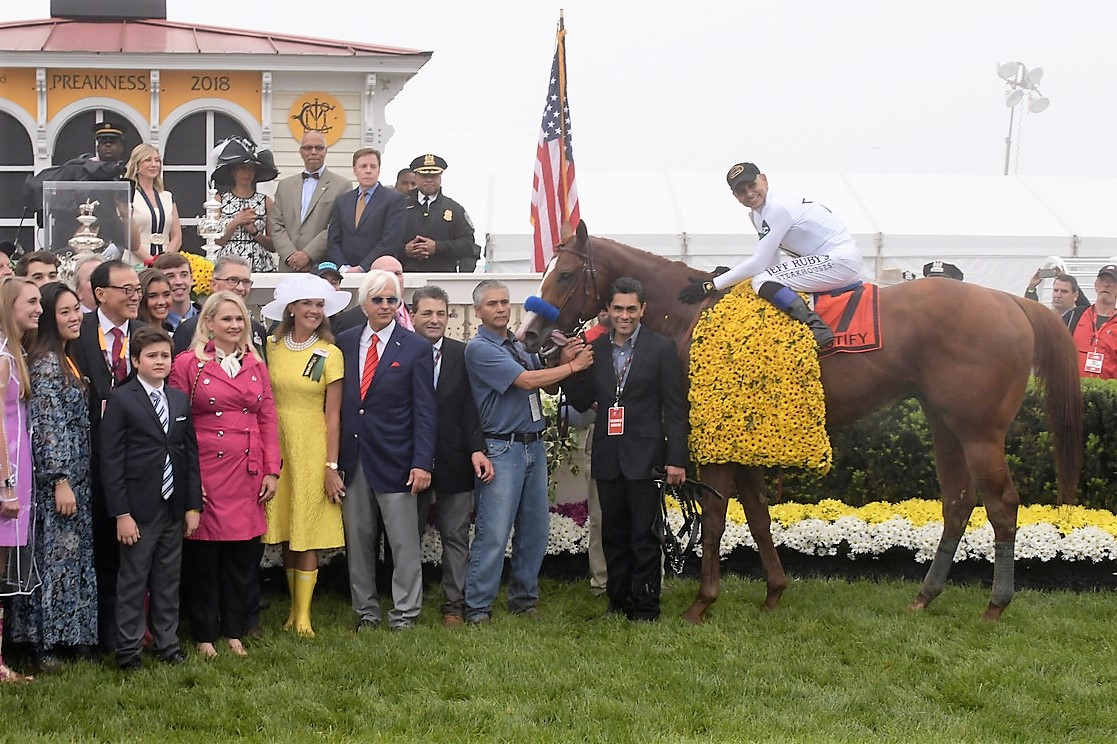
Triple Crown winner Justify has six crosses to Northern Dancer.

Northern Dancer's impact continues well into the 21st century. In North America, 2018 Triple Crown winner Justify has multiple crosses to Northern Dancer, in the direct male line through Storm Cat, and also through Nijinsky and Vice Regent. American Pharoah, winner of the 2015 Triple Crown is 5 × 5 inbred to Northern Dancer, through Storm Bird and El Gran Senor. California Chrome, winner of the 2014 Kentucky Derby and Preakness Stakes, is inbred 4 × 5 to Northern Dancer on his dam's side. Northern Dancer appears at least once in the pedigree of every contestant in the 2018 Kentucky Derby.

More Northern Dancer-descended horses are Breeders' Cup winners than from any other horse. According to pedigree consultant John Sparkman, 35 to 40 percent of American graded stakes winners of 2013 were male line descendants of Northern Dancer. In Europe and Australia, the percentage is well over 60 per cent.

In Europe, Northern Dancer's bloodline is pervasive. Northern Dancer was a four-time Leading sire in Great Britain and Ireland, a feat achieved one time each by his sons Be My Guest and Nijinsky, 14 times by his son Sadler's Wells, two times by his grandson Caerleon, three times by his grandson Danehill, and twelve times (as of 2021) by his grandson Galileo – a total of 36 champion sire titles in just the direct Northern Dancer to grandson bloodline. Adding his great-grandsons Danehill Dancer, who was the leading sire in 2009, and Frankel (2021) the Northern Dancer sire line accounted for every champion sire title in Great Britain and Ireland from 1990 to 2021 inclusive.

He is the paternal grand-sire of a record 29 different English Classic winners — the next closest in this regard is St. Simon with 23. As for the Epsom Derby, a 2011 study showed that every winner since 1998 had Northern Dancer in his pedigree. The Northern Dancer sire line has accounted for 28 Derby winners as of 2019. Galileo, High Chaparral, Motivator, New Approach, Sea the Stars, Camelot, Australia, and Golden Horn are included in this number.

=== Inbreeding ===
Because of the prevalence of Northern Dancer's bloodline, a certain degree of inbreeding to him is becoming common. Whenever this happens, there is a concern that the inbreeding will weaken the breed, making horses more prone to injury and potentially leading to inbreeding depression. Statistical studies have shown that inbreeding has increased by a small but significant amount in the last 50 years, partly because of the larger number of foals that a successful stallion will now sire each year compared to in the past. For example, Northern Dancer sired 645 foals in 20 years at stud, whereas his grandson Danehill sired 2,499 foals in 14 years at stud.

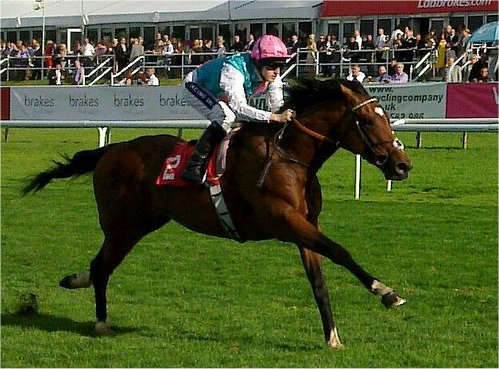
The undefeated Frankel is inbred to Northern Dancer.

Statistical analysis has shown that inbreeding to Northern Dancer is on average slightly less effective than when stallions of his line are bred to mares who do not have Northern Dancer in their pedigree (referred to as an outcross). However, many successful stallions are inbred, in part because this can make it easier to pass on dominant characteristics. Notable sires that are inbred to Northern Dancer (within four generations) include Oasis Dream, Rock of Gibraltar, Hernando, Spinning World, Redoute's Choice, and Frankel.

Northern Dancer lines were originally outcrossed on descendants of Mr. Prospector or Nasrullah, but this became so common that it is increasingly difficult to find horses from these lines who do not also carry Northern Dancer breeding. Outcross bloodlines can still be found, most notably through Sunday Silence and the German-bred stallion Monsun.

In North America, Northern Dancer is farther back in the pedigree of most major sires, decreasing the risks associated with inbreeding. For example, Tapit, the leading sire in North America from 2014 to 2016, is inbred 3 × 5 to Nijinsky II (thus 4 × 6 to Northern Dancer). He has crossed well with mares from other Northern Dancer lines.

== Pedigree ==
Northern Dancer was by Nearctic, who in turn was sired by Nearco, an Italian-bred horse who was undefeated in fourteen starts. Retired to stud in England, Nearco was considered a "breed-shaping" sire of sires. In 1952, Taylor attended the Newmarket December sale in England, where he purchased Lady Angela, a daughter of leading sire Hyperion. In 1953, Taylor had Lady Angela bred to Nearco before shipping her to Canada, where she foaled Nearctic in early 1954. Nearctic was Canadian Horse of the Year in 1958, a feat that Northern Dancer matched in 1964.

Northern Dancer's broodmare sire (maternal grandsire) was Native Dancer, who also was an important sire of sires, chiefly through Raise A Native and Mr. Prospector. Northern Dancer was thus an immediate descendant of three of the most important bloodlines of the middle twentieth century (Nearco, Hyperion and Native Dancer).

His female family is equally distinguished, if not as well-known. Northern Dancer's dam Natalma was a stakes-placed mare who was disqualified from a win in the Spinaway Stakes. She developed a knee chip in June 1960 and Taylor decided to breed her to Nearctic in his first year at stud rather than keep her in training. Northern Dancer, a late foal on May 27, 1961, was the result. Natalma established herself as a "blue hen", producing not only Northern Dancer but three other stakes winners. Her daughters have further extended the family: Arctic Dancer, a full sister of Northern Dancer, became the dam of La Prevoyante, 1972 Canadian Horse of the Year; Spring Adieu became the second dam of leading international sire Danehill (who is inbred to Natalma as he is also a grandson of Northern Dancer); and Raise the Standard is the granddam of important European sire Machiavellian.

Natalma's dam Almahmoud produced several other influential daughters including Cosmah, who produced four stakes winners including Tosmah (three-time American champion filly) and Halo, who would go on to sire Sunday Silence. Another daughter of Almahmoud, Bubbling Beauty, produced Arctic Tern, the French champion sire of 1986.

Pedigree of Northern Dancer (CAN), bay stallion, 1961
Sire Nearctic (CAN) Br/bl. 1954	Nearco (ITY); Br. 1935	Pharos (GB)	Phalaris (GB)
Sire Nearctic (CAN) Br/bl. 1954	Nearco (ITY); Br. 1935	Pharos (GB)	Scapa Flow (GB)
Sire Nearctic (CAN) Br/bl. 1954	Nearco (ITY); Br. 1935	Nogara (ITY)	Havresac II (FR)
Sire Nearctic (CAN) Br/bl. 1954	Nearco (ITY); Br. 1935	Nogara (ITY)	Catnip (IRE)
Sire Nearctic (CAN) Br/bl. 1954	Lady Angela (GB) ch. 1944	Hyperion (GB)	Gainsborough (GB)
Sire Nearctic (CAN) Br/bl. 1954	Lady Angela (GB) ch. 1944	Hyperion (GB)	Selene (GB)
Sire Nearctic (CAN) Br/bl. 1954	Lady Angela (GB) ch. 1944	Sister Sarah (GB)	Abbots Trace (IRE)
Sire Nearctic (CAN) Br/bl. 1954	Lady Angela (GB) ch. 1944	Sister Sarah (GB)	Sarita (GB)
Dam Natalma (USA) B. 1957	Native Dancer gr. 1950	Polynesian	Unbreakable
Dam Natalma (USA) B. 1957	Native Dancer gr. 1950	Polynesian	Black Polly
Dam Natalma (USA) B. 1957	Native Dancer gr. 1950	Geisha	Discovery
Dam Natalma (USA) B. 1957	Native Dancer gr. 1950	Geisha	Miyako
Dam Natalma (USA) B. 1957	Almahmoud ch. 1947	Mahmoud (FR)	Blenheim (GB)
Dam Natalma (USA) B. 1957	Almahmoud ch. 1947	Mahmoud (FR)	Mah Mahal (GB)
Dam Natalma (USA) B. 1957	Almahmoud ch. 1947	Arbitrator	Peace Chance
Dam Natalma (USA) B. 1957	Almahmoud ch. 1947	Arbitrator	Mother Goose (Family 2-d)

== See also ==
- List of racehorses

== Sources ==
- Lennox, Muriel (1995). Northern Dancer : legend and legacy. Toronto: Beach House Books. ISBN 0-9699025-0-6.
- Hunter, Avalyn (2006). The Kingmaker : how Northern Dancer founded a racing dynasty (1st ed.). Eclipse Press. ISBN 1-58150-137-4.
