= Selene Stakes =

- Class: Grade III
- Location: Woodbine Racetrack; Toronto, Ontario, Canada
- Inaugurated: 1954
- Race type: Thoroughbred - Flat racing
- Website: www.woodbineentertainment.com/qct/default.asp

Race information
- Distance: 1 1/16 miles (8.5 furlongs)
- Surface: Tapeta
- Track: left-handed
- Qualification: Three-Year-Old Fillies
- Weight: Allowances
- Purse: $150,000 (2021)

The Selene Stakes is a Thoroughbred horse race run annually at Woodbine Racetrack in Toronto, Ontario, Canada. Held during the third week of May, the Grade III event is open to three-year-old fillies. Raced over a distance of 1 1/16 miles on Polytrack synthetic dirt, it currently offers a current purse of $122,145.

Inaugurated in 1954 as a six furlong sprint race, it was run at a distance of seven furlongs from 1965 through 1975 after which it was modified to its current distance of 1 1/16 miles (8.5 furlongs).

The race was run in two divisions in 1962, 1964, 1972, 1979, 1983, and 1989.

== Records ==
Speed record:

- 1:42.29 - Grizzel (2017)

Most wins by a jockey:

- 5 - Sandy Hawley (1972, 1974, 1978, 1988, 1989)
- 5 - Patrick Husbands (2001, 2012, 2018, 2021, 2022)

Most wins by a trainer:

- 8 - Mark E. Casse (2001, 2012, 2015, 2018, 2019, 2020, 2021, 2022, 2023)

Most wins by an owner:

- 4 - Conn Smythe (1957, 1959, 1964, 1979)
- 4 - Gary Barber (2018, 2019, 2020, 2023)

== Winners ==
| Year | Winner | Jockey | Trainer | Owner | Time |
|---|---|---|---|---|---|
| 2026 | Luster | Fraser Aebly | Joise Carroll | Gainesway Stable (Anthony Beck) and Andrew Rosen | 1:44.06 |
| 2025 | Serendipity | Rafael Manuel Hernandez | Joise Carroll | NK Racing and LNJ Foxwoods | 1:45.22 |
| 2024 | Sabatini | Sofia Vives | Joise Carroll | NK Racing and LNJ Foxwoods | 1:43.07 |
| 2023 | Solo Album | Sahin Civavi | Mark E. Casse | Gary Barber, Eclipse Thoroughbred Partners and Steven Rocco | 1:42.65 |
| 2022 | Souper Hoity Toity | Patrick Husbands | Mark E. Casse | Life Oak Plantation | 1:45.11 |
| 2021 | Our Flash Drive | Patrick Husbands | Mark E. Casse | Live Oak Plantation | 1:44.69 |
| 2020 | Two Sixty | Emma-Jayne Wilson | Mark E. Casse | Gary Barber | 1:45.01 |
| 2019 | Power Gal | Emma-Jayne Wilson | Mark E. Casse | Gary Barber | 1:44.11 |
| 2018 | Miss Mo Mentum | Patrick Husbands | Mark E. Casse | Gary Barber | 1:42.36 |
| 2017 | Grizzel (IRE) | David Moran | Michael Doyle | Merribelle Stable & Anna Doyle | 1:42.29 |
| 2016 | Gamble's Ghost | Luis Contreras | Josie Carroll | Ivan Dalos | 1:45.05 |
| 2015 | Ol' Fashion Gal | Alan Garcia | Mark E. Casse | B & V Poston Racing | 1:44.73 |
| 2014 | Paladin Bay | Gerry Olguin | Harold Ladouceur | Jessie L. Ladouceur | 1:43.96 |
| 2013 | Coffee Clique | Luis Contreras | Brian A. Lynch | Amerman Racing | 1:43.63 |
| 2012 | Dixie Strike | Patrick Husbands | Mark E. Casse | John C. Oxley | 1:43.79 |
| 2011 | Smart Sting | Eurico Rosa da Silva | Roger Attfield | Stronach Stables | 1:43.73 |
| 2010 | Biofuel | Eurico Rosa da Silva | Reade Baker | Brereton C. Jones | 1:43.36 |
| 2009 | Aurora Lights | James McAleney | Eric Coatrieux | Chiefswood Stable | 1:43.37 |
| 2008 | Verdana Bold | Emile Ramsammy | Daniel J. Vella | Edward Seltzer | 1:44.20 |
| 2007 | Bear Now | Emile Ramsammy | Reade Baker | Bear Stables, Ltd. | 1:43.73 |
| 2006 | Seductively | Gerry L. Olguin | Ian Black | Kinghaven Farms | 1:44.48 |
| 2005 | Gold Strike | James McAleney | Reade Baker | Harlequin Ranches | 1:45.80 |
| 2004 | Eye of the Sphynx | Todd Kabel | Mark Frostad | Sam-Son Farm | 1:48.28 |
| 2003 | Too Late Now | Robert Landry | James E. Day | Come By Chance Stable | 1:44.36 |
| 2002 | See How She Runs | Donald R. Pettinger | Donnie K. Von Hemel | Pin Oak Stable | 1:45.49 |
| 2001 | Dark Ending | Patrick Husbands | Mark E. Casse | Mockingbird Farm Inc | 1:48.02 |
| 2000 | Zoftig | Marlon St. Julien | Michael J. Doyle | Glencrest Farm et al. | 1:48.59 |
| 1999 | Roaring Twenties | Aaron Gryder | Joe Orseno | Stronach Stables | 1:47.84 |
| 1998 | Lady Beverly | Na Somsanith | Gary Chan | Daijyobu Racing Stable | 1:44.60 |
| 1997 | Cotton Carnival | Robert Landry | Roger Attfield | Windhaven | 1:44.00 |
| 1996 | Briarcliff | Dave Penna | W. Elliott Walden | Carl / Humphrey Jr. | 1:44.40 |
| 1995 | Daijin | Todd Kabel | Daniel J. Vella | John & Glen Sikura | 1:44.40 |
| 1994 | Holly Regent | Don Seymour | Peter DiPasquale | Peter DiPasquale | 1:43.20 |
| 1993 | Hey Hazel | Don Seymour | Roger Attfield | Mickey Canino | 1:45.20 |
| 1992 | Dactylic | James McAleney | Grant Pearce | King Caledon Farm | 1:45.60 |
| 1991 | Dance Smartly | Brian Swatuk | James E. Day | Sam-Son Farm | 1:43.60 |
| 1990 | Secreto's Glory | Ray Sabourin | Bernard Girault | Frank Stronach | 1:45.60 |
| 1989 | Rose Park | Sandy Hawley | George Nagy | Tweedhill Farm | 1:45.40 |
| 1989 | Victorious Trick | Richard Dos Ramos | David R. Bell | John A. Franks | 1:46.00 |
| 1988 | Tilt My Halo | Sandy Hawley | James E. Day | Sam-Son Farm | 1:46.60 |
| 1987 | One From Heaven | Gary Stahlbaum | Phil England | Richard R. Kennedy | 1:46.60 |
| 1986 | Triple Wow | Robin Platts | Roger Attfield | Kinghaven Farms | 1:45.20 |
| 1985 | Bessarabian | Gary Stahlbaum | Michael J. Doyle | Eaton Hall Farm | 1:46.40 |
| 1984 | Lantana Lady | Dave Penna | Arthur H. Warner | R. R. Kennedy/B. J. Cullen | 1:48.00 |
| 1983 | Little To Do | David Clark | George M. Carter | Whitco Farms | 1:46.40 |
| 1983 | Lovin Touch | Larry Attard | Jerry C. Meyer | Verne Winchell | 1:44.60 |
| 1982 | Girlie | Gary Stahlbaum | N. Herbert | R. L. Green | 1:46.60 |
| 1981 | Lady Face | Dave Penna | Frank Merrill, Jr. | E. G. Hyde | 1:44.20 |
| 1980 | Flightish | Lloyd Duffy | John Morahan | Gus Schickedanz | 1:45.20 |
| 1979 | Come Lucky Chance | Gary Stahlbaum | C. Cliff Hopmans, Jr. | Conn Smythe | 1:46.20 |
| 1979 | Vaguely Modest | Joey Belowus | Gil Rowntree | Stafford Farms | 1:45.00 |
| 1978 | L'Alezane | Sandy Hawley | Yonnie Starr | Jean-Louis Levesque | 1:43.60 |
| 1977 | Northernette | Avelino Gomez | Jerry C. Meyer | Syl Asadoorian & Sam Cosentino | 1:43.60 |
| 1976 | La Jalouse | John LeBlanc | Yonnie Starr | Jean-Louis Levesque | 1:45.60 |
| 1975 | Deepstar | Lloyd Duffy | David Guitard | Kinghaven Farms | 1:23.20 |
| 1974 | Trudie Tudor | Sandy Hawley | John Morahan | Douglas Banks | 1:24.00 |
| 1973 | Impressive Lady | Hugo Dittfach | Edward Mann | J. M. Brunton | 1:22.60 |
| 1972 | Happy Victory | Sandy Hawley | David C. Brown | C. J. Jackson | 1:24.60 |
| 1972 | Lady of Example | Robin Platts | N. Julius | Janley Stable | 1:23.60 |
| 1971 | Main Pan | Richard Armstrong | Odie Clelland | Peter D. Fuller | 1:23.60 |
| 1970 | Fanfreluche | Chris Rogers | Yonnie Starr | Jean-Louis Levesque | 1:23.20 |
| 1969 | Drama School | Richard Grubb | Gordon J. McCann | Windfields Farm | 1:24.80 |
| 1968 | Mink Stole | Wayne Chambers | Carl F. Chapman | Angrosa Stable | 1:24.80 |
| 1967 | Kate's Intent | Hugo Dittfach | Lou Cavalaris, Jr. | Peter D. Fuller | 1:23.60 |
| 1966 | Kerensa | R. Cox | Frank Merrill, Jr. | Mrs. Horatio A. Luro | 1:24.20 |
| 1965 | Princess Cloud | Larry Reynolds | R. Discher | Parise & Farrell | 1:24.00 |
| 1964 | Menaris | James Fitzsimmons | Yonnie Starr | Conn Smythe | 1:11.40 |
| 1964 | Royal Tara | Jerry Harrison | Glenn Magnusson | Stafford Farms | 1:10.40 |
| 1963 | Balaklair | Keith Robinson | Mike Long | Mike Long | 1:12.20 |
| 1962 | Roman Anna | Harold Bolin | S. U. Ross | E. C. Pasquale | 1:11.80 |
| 1962 | I Recall † | George Gubbins | Morris Fishman | B. & G. Stable | 1:12.00 |
| 1961 | Match Girl | Ralph Borgemenke | W. Morrisey | Miss O. R. Armstrong | 1:12.20 |
| 1960 | Skinny Minny | Al Coy | John Passero | William R. Beasley | 1:11.20 |
| 1959 | Wonder Where | Al Coy | Yonnie Starr | Maloney & Smythe | 1:10.40 |
| 1958 | Windy Answer | Ben Sorensen | Gordon J. McCann | Windfields Farm | 1:10.60 |
| 1957 | Jet Marine | Herb Lindberg | Yonnie Starr | Maloney & Smythe | 1:14.00 |
| 1956 | Gracefield III | Herb Lindberg | Mike Long | Luxiana Stable | 1:13.40 |
| 1955 | Rouge Maid | David Stevenson | V. Scott | North Downs Farm | 1:12.40 |
| 1954 | Carolator | David Stevenson | Jim G. Fair | Jim G. Fair | 1:12.00 |

* † In the second division of the 1962 race, Vase finished first but was disqualified and set back to fifth.

== See also ==
- List of Canadian flat horse races
