= Simcoe Stakes =

- Class: Restricted stakes
- Location: Woodbine Racetrack; Etobicoke, Ontario, Canada
- Inaugurated: 1953
- Race type: Thoroughbred, Flat racing
- Website: woodbine.com

Race information
- Distance: 6.5 furlongs
- Surface: Tapeta
- Track: left-handed
- Qualification: Two-year-old colts & geldings, foaled in Canada
- Purse: $250,000 (2020)

The Simcoe Stakes is a Canadian Thoroughbred horse race run annually at Woodbine Racetrack in Toronto, Ontario. The race is restricted to Canadian foaled two-year-old colts and geldings sold through the Canadian Thoroughbred Horse Society (CTHS) Ontario yearling sale.

== History ==
Years	Distance F	Surface	Location
1953-1956	5 F	dirt	Fort Erie Race Track
1957	5.5 F	dirt	Fort Erie Race Track
1958	6 F	dirt	Fort Erie Race Track
1959-1960	6.5 F	dirt	Greenwood Raceway
1961-1973	7 F	dirt	Woodbine Racetrack
1974	7 F	dirt	Fort Erie Race Track
1975-2005	7 F	dirt	Woodbine Racetrack
2006	6.5 F	Polytrack	Woodbine Racetrack
2007-2010	7 F	Polytrack	Woodbine Racetrack
2011-2015	6.5 F	Polytrack	Woodbine Racetrack
2016 to date	6.5 F	Tapeta	Woodbine Racetrack

== Records ==
Speed record:

- 1:17.90 @ 6.5 furlongs: Dragon's Brew (2020)
- 1:23.09 @ 7 furlongs: Invitation Only (2010)

Most wins by a jockey:

- 7 - David K. Clark (1982, 1984, 1987, 1998, 2001, 2003, 2005)

Most wins by a trainer:

- 6 - Jerry C. Meyer (1962, 1966, 1967, 1969, 1970, 1985)

Most wins by an owner:

- 3 - Willow Downs Farm (Saul Wagman) (1966, 1967, 1970)

== Winners ==
Year	Winner	Age	Jockey	Trainer	Owner	Dist. (Furlongs)	Time	Win$
2020	Dragon's Brew	2	Daisuke Fukumoto	Robert P. Tiller	Goldmart Farms (David Sepiashvili)	6.5 f	1:17.90	$150,000
2019	Rockcrest	2	Sahin Civaci	Nigel R. Burke	Paul Mouttet	6.5 f	1:18.14	$105,000
2018	Blessed Two	2	Gary Boulanger	Kevin Attard	Derek Chin	6.5 f	1:19.99	$105,000
2017	Eskiminzin	2	Patrick Husbands	Analisa Delmas	Jecara Farms (Brett Delmas)	6.5 f	1:17.41	$120,000
2016	Lokinforpursemonee	2	Gary Boulanger	John A. Ross	J.R. Racing Stable Inc.	6.5 f	1:18.79	$120,000
2015	Amis Gizmo	2	Luis Contreras	Josie Carroll	Ivan Dalos	6.5 f	1:16.22	$120,000
2014	Phil's Cocktail	2	David J. Moran	John LeBlanc Jr.	Ron I. Clarkson	6.5 f	1:16.78	$120,000
2013	Go Greeley	2	Eurico Rosa Da Silva	John A. Ross	J.R. Racing Stable Inc.	6.5 f	1:16.32	$120,000
2012	Dynamic Sky	2	Luis Contreras	Mark E. Casse	John C. Oxley	6.5 f	1:17.70	$120,000
2011	Menlo Castle	2	Patrick Husbands	Ralph J. Biamonte	Conor Healy	6.5 f	1:16.25	$120,000
2010	Invitation Only	2	Omar Moreno	David Cotey	Dominion Bloodstock, Derek Ball, HGHR, Inc.	7 f	1:23.09	$75,000
2009	Fastin Bear	2	Eurico Rosa da Silva	Reade Baker	Bear Stables	7 f	1:23.84	$75,000
2008	Mean Green	2	Jono Jones	Sid C. Attard	Norseman Racing Stable (Howard Walton)	7 f	1:23.42	$75,000
2007	Don's Folly	2	Slade Callaghan	Michael P. De Paulo	Don A. Cole	7 f	1:23.39	$75,000
2006	Legal Move	2	Patrick Husbands	Mark E. Casse	Woodford Racing LLC	6.5 f	1:17.76	$75,000
2005	Edenwold	2	David K. Clark	Josie Carroll	James & Alice Sapara	7 f	1:24.45	$75,000
2004	Moonshine Justice	2	Todd Kabel	David Cotey	Dominion Bloodstock, Derek Ball, Hugh Galbraith	7 f	1:24.68	$81,675
2003	Twisted Wit	2	David K. Clark	Robert P. Tiller	Rolph A. Davis	7 f	1:25.49	$83,850
2002	Mobil	2	Todd Kabel	Michael Keough	Gus Schickedanz	7 f	1:25.59	$63,030
2001	Rare Friends	2	David K. Clark	Robert P. Tiller	Frank Di Giulio Jr.	7 f	1:24.12	$61,680
2000	Highland Legacy	2	Emile Ramsammy	Steven Owens	Empress Stable	7 f	1:25.17	$63,510
1999	I And I	2	Rui Pimentel	Wellesley L. Clayton	Wellesley L. Clayton	7 f	1:24.63	$63,480
1998	China Ruckus	2	David K. Clark	Tony Mattine	Linmac Farms	7 f	1:25.20	$62,670
1997	Brite Adam	2	Todd Kabel	Rita A. Schnitzler	R.M.C. Stable	7 f	1:25.60	$62,850
1996	Special Deputy	2	Robert landry	Macdonald Benson	Patrick B. Ballentine	7 f	1:23.80	$61,950
1995	Reblin	2	Emile Ramsammy	Bernard Girault	Peter Chiodo	7 f	1:25.00	$62,850
1994	Saints Leader	2	Robin Platts	Macdonald Benson	Augustin Stable	7 f	1:22.60	$61,650
1993	Real Ruckus	2	Robert Landry	Daniel Vella	Frank Stronach	7 f	1:25.40	$66,000
1992	So Unforgettable	2	Jack Lauzon	P. Noel Hickey	Irish Acres Farm	7 f	1:24.20	$67,800
1991	Elated Guy	2	Jack Lauzon	Robert P. Tiller	Frank Sr. & Frank Jr. Di Giulio	7 f	1:25.40	$174,000
1990	Do's And Don't's	2	Jack Lauzon	Brian Kessel	Brian Kessel	7 f	1:24.60	$162,000
1989	Floral Dancer	2	Lloyd Duffy	Conrad Cohen	Syl Asadoorian & D. Nurse	7 f	1:26.20	$139,200
1988	My Dad Cornelius	2	Larry Attard	Joe Attard	Pinoy Racing Stable	7 f	1:26.00	$65,400
1987	Highland Ruckus	2	David K. Clark	Tony Mattine	Linmac Farms	7 f	1:24.60	$47,700
1986-1	Bold Executive	2	Richard Dos Ramos	Gerry Belanger	Dom Romeo, Rocco Marcello, Pedigree Stud (Frank Maida)	7 f	1:24.80	$33,600
1986-2	Orderofexcellence	2	Robert King Jr.	Debi Lockhurst	Alex Clarkson & Patty Barr	7 f	1:25.40	$33,150
1985	In The East	2	Brian Swatuk	Jerry C. Meyer	Gardiner Farms	7 f	1:24.60	$50,850
1984	Crowning Honors	2	David K. Clark	Arthur H. Warner	Richard R. Kennedy	7 f	1:26.60	$51,300
1983	Park Regent	2	Dan Beckon	Gordon M. Huntley	Parkview Stable	7 f	1:25.20	$50,850
1982	Haliburton Huskie	2	David K. Clark	Glenn Magnusson	Gary F. Vasey & partner	7 f	1:25.80	$51,300
1981	Maple Creek	2	Dave Penna	Donald J. Campbell	Mike Penhale & partners	7 f	1:25.40	$33,900
1980	Moteral	2	John Bell	Emile Allain	Sydney Langill, O’Connor, Willcock	7 f	1:26.00	$16,200
1979	New Regent	2	George HoSang	Brian Ottaway	Mrs. George McCullogh	7 f	1:24.60	$11,300
1978	Coup de Chance	2	Dan Beckon	Joseph "Yonnie" Starr	J. Louis Levesque	7 f	1:25.20	$10,600
1977	Norsak	2	Gary Stahlbaum	E. Gerber	Gardiner Farm	7 f	1:25.60	$11,200
1976	Regal Sir	2	Sandy Hawley	Carl F. Chapman	J. B. W. Carmichael	7 f	1:24.40	$11,700
1975	Laissez-Passer	2	Jeffrey Fell	Jacques Dumas	J. Louis Levesque	7 f	1:28.20	$8,175
1974-1	Gallant Topic	2	Chris Rogers	Carl F. Chapman	A. Smith	7 f	1:18.60	$8,400
1974-2	Sand Pass Joe	2	Robin Platts	Peter DiPasquale	Northern Stable	7 f	1:20.60	$8,300
1973-1	Noble Answer	2	Lloyd Duffy	Frank H. Merrill Jr.	Viscount Hardinge	7 f	1:25.20	$8,025
1973-2	Native Aid	2	Sandy Hawley	Edward Mann	George C. Hendrie	7 f	1:24.00	$8,100
1972-1	Fabiusand	2	Gary Stahlbaum	Petro N. Peters	Ernest Lieberman	7 f	1:25.20	$5,600
1972-2	Victorian Prince	2	Avelino Gomez	Gil Robillard	Grovetree, B.C. Stables	7 f	1:24.80	$5,600
1971-1	Brief Escar	2	James Kelly	Andrew G. Smithers	Ernest Lieberman	7 f	1:25.00	$5,750
1971-2	Tommy Jack	2	Brian Swatuk	Walter Woods	Ned Bragagnolo	7 f	1:24.20	$5,750
1970	Great Gabe	2	Sandy Hawley	Jerry C. Meyer	Willow Downs Farm (Saul Wagman)	7 f	1:24.20	$5,750
1969-1	South Ocean	2	Richard Grubb	Gordon J. McCann	Charles P. B. Taylor	7 f	1:24.80	$5,750
1969-2	Canadian Jerry	2	Robin Platts	Jerry C. Meyer	Henry Katz	7 f	1:24.80	$5,750
1968	Peter Power	2	Jim Fitzsimmons	Arthur H. Warner	L. Weinstein & H. A. Fields	7 f	1:27.00	$15,750
1967	Real Sensible	2	Avelino Gomez	Jerry C. Meyer	Willow Downs Farm (Saul Wagman)	7 f	1:25.20	$5,900
1966	Pine Point	2	Avelino Gomez	Jerry C. Meyer	Willow Downs Farm (Saul Wagman)	7 f	1:26.00	$5,900
1965	Holarctic	2	Noel Turcotte	Wolfgang von Richthofen	Frank A. & Frank H. Sherman	7 f	1:28.80	$6,125
1964	Greek Salt	2	Jim Fitzsimmons	Joseph "Yonnie" Starr	Conn Smythe	7 f	1:23.00	$6,650
1963	Miss Essco	2	Jerry Harrison	James R. Brown	R. & R. Stable	7 f	1:25.80	$4,575
1962	Prince Bubi	2	Jim Fitzsimmons	Jerry C. Meyer	Mario Dellio	7 f	1:25.20	$4,500
1961	Sly Invader	2	Avelino Gomez	C. Holliday	Bo-Teek Farm	7 f	1:27.40	$4,575
1960	Real Gentleman	2	Al Coy	Donald Drake	R. M. Sullivan	7 f	1:21.40	$2,625
1959	Banner Lou	2	Avelino Gomez	C. Lawson	L. V. Myslivic	7 f	1:22.00	$2,725
1958	Winning Shot	2	Emile Roy	Nicholas Julius	J. S. Evans	7 f	1:13.20	$3,425
1957	Bright Page	2	Avelino Gomez	Gordon M. Huntley	Kinrara	7 f	1:06.60	$3,500
1956	Jet Marine	2	George J. Walker	Joseph "Yonnie" Starr	Larkin Maloney & Conn Smythe	7 f	1:03.00	$3,475
1955	Bun Linn	2	Mike Mafale	C. Lawson	Bayfield Farm	7 f	1:00.80	$3,400
1954	Indifferent	2	W. Hawksworth	R. McDonald	J. Stuart	7 f	0:59.80	$3,375
1953	Windina	2	Gene Pederson	James C. Bentley	Ben R. Steen	7 f	1:00.40	$2,185
