= Ontario Debutante Stakes =

- Class: Ungraded Stakes
- Location: Woodbine Racetrack; Toronto, Ontario, Canada
- Inaugurated: 1979
- Race type: Thoroughbred - Flat racing
- Website: www.woodbineentertainment.com

Race information
- Distance: Six furlong sprint
- Surface: Polytrack
- Track: left-handed
- Qualification: Two-year-old Fillies
- Weight: Allowances
- Purse: $95,163 (2015) (Plus $50,000 for Ontario Breds from the T.I.P.)

The Ontario Debutante Stakes is a Canadian Thoroughbred horse race run annually in mid-August at Woodbine Racetrack in Toronto, Ontario. Open to Two-year-old Fillies, it is contested over Six furlongs on Polytrac synthetic dirt.

From 1989 through 1993 and from 1995 through 1997, the Ontario Debutante Stakes was hosted by Fort Erie Racetrack in Fort Erie, Ontario. The race was run in two divisions in 1979.

== Records ==
Speed record: (Through 1998, Woodbine times were recorded in fifths of a second. Since 1999 they are in hundredths of a second)

- 1:09.75 - Knights Templar (2005)

Most wins by an owner:

- 3 - Kinghaven Farms (1982, 1983, 2000)

Most wins by a jockey:

- 5 - David Clark (1979, 1980, 1987, 1989, 2006)

Most wins by a trainer:

- 3 - Roger Attfield (1995, 2000, 2004)

== Winners ==
Year	Winner	Jockey	Trainer	Owner	Time
2016	Just Be Kind	Jim McAleney	Reade Baker	Just Luk Stables, Rick Mah, Reade Baker Racing Stable Inc.	
2015	Get Rhythm	Eurico Rosa Da Silva	Catherine Day Phillips	Anderson Farms Ontario	1:10.82
2014	Dixie Twist	Gary Boulanger	Mark E. Casse	John C. Oxley	1:11.14
2013	Skylander Girl	Jim McAleney	Alex Patykewich	Alexander Patykewich	1:11.05
2012	Sweet Redemption	Luis Conteras	Greg de Gannes	Southern Chase Farm	1:11.02
2011	Tu Endie Wei	James McAleney	Reade Baker	Brereton C. Jones	1:16.53
2010	Wonderlandbynight	E. T. Baird	Michael L. Reavis	Mark Dedomenico LLC	1:17.40
2009	Franny Freud	Patrick Husbands	Brian A. Lynch	Paul Pompa, Jr., et al.	1:10.29
2008	Juliet's Spirit	Jim McAleney	Steve Asmussen	Padua Stables	1:10.17
2007	Officer Cherrie	Patrick Husbands	Mark E. Casse	Charles Laloggia	1:10.45
2006	Stillistillmovin	David Clark	Nicholas Gonzalez	Tucci Stable	0:58.27
2005	Knights Templar	Constant Montpellier	Daniel J. Vella	Clover IV Stables et al.	1:09.75
2004	South Bay Cove	Todd Kabel	Roger Attfield	Windhaven Farm	1:11.81
2003	Slightlymorelikely	Todd Kabel	Norman J. McKnight	Ronald S. Udit	1:11.39
2002	Handpainted	Todd Kabel	Josie Carroll	John & Glenn Sikura	1:12.34
2001	Platel	Emile Ramsammy	Vito Armata	Molinaro Stable	1:10.91
2000	Poetically	Robert Landry	Roger Attfield	Kinghaven Farms	1:10.23
1999	Frosty Kiss	Ray Sabourin	John A. Ross	Jam Jar Racing Stable	1:12.01
1998	Madam Du Barri	Neil Poznansky	Laurie Silvera	B. & M./L. Silvera	1:12.60
1997	Lady Beverly	Steve Bahen	Arthur Silvera	Daijyobu Racing	1:10.60
1996	Classic Threat	Robert Landry	Macdonald Benson	Augustin Stable	1:11.40
1995	Fly North	Robin Platts	Roger Attfield	Virginia Kraft Payson	1:11.60
1994	Honky Tonk Tune	Robert Landry	Daniel J. Vella	Frank Stronach	1:11.40
1993	Questelavie	James McKnight	Kathy Patton-Casse	Sheehan Farms	1:11.40
1992	Sermon Time	Don Seymour	Kathy Patton-Casse	Bruno Schickedanz	1:11.80
1991	Bucky's Solution	Larry Attard	Tino Attard	Elizabeth A. Farr	1:10.80
1990	Regal Pennant	Robert King, Jr.	George Bankuti	Lucky Circle Stable	1:13.20
1989	Prospective Dolly	David Clark	Tony Mattine	N. Clements/M. Rich	1:10.00
1988	Victorious Trick	Richard Dos Ramos	David R. Bell	John A. Franks	1:11.60
1987	Native Nova	David Clark	Gord Huntley	Rowanwood Stable	1:11.60
1986	Ruling Angel	Jeffrey Fell	James E. Day	Sam-Son Farm	1:10.80
1985	Chocolate Swiss	Brian Swatuk	Tony Mattine	Marcocchio/Fonesca	1:10.80
1984	Bessarabian	Gary Stahlbaum	Mike Doyle	Eaton Hall Farm	1:10.40
1983	Summer Mood	Robin Platts	John J. Tammaro Jr.	Kinghaven Farms	1:11.60
1982	Candle Bright	Eric Beitia	Michael Tammaro	Kinghaven Farms	1:12.40
1981	Aironlass	Brian Swatuk	Jerry C. Meyer	Verne Winchell	1:12.00
1980	Kushog	David Clark	Glenn Magnusson	G. Vasey & D. Finn	1:11.80
1979	Lacey	David Clark	Frank Merrill Jr.	Gilbride / O’Connell	1:25.40
1979	Par Excellance	John LeBlanc	Jacques Dumas	Knightsbridge/Greenberg	1:25.60
