= Bessarabia (disambiguation) =

Bessarabia is a historical term for the geographic region in Eastern Europe bounded by the Dniester River on the east and the Prut River on the west.

Bessarabia may also refer to:

- Bessarabia Oblast and Governorate, Russian Empire 1812–1917
- Bessarabian Soviet Socialist Republic, proclaimed 1919
- Bessarabia Governorate (Romania), 1941–1944
- Bessarabian question, a geopolitical dispute regarding Bessarabia
- Bessarabian, a Canadian Thoroughbred racehorse
- Bessarabian Stakes, named after the racehorse
- Metropolis of Bessarabia, a church jurisdiction in Moldova that is part of the Romanian Orthodox Church
