= Ballade Stakes =

- Class: Restricted Stakes
- Location: Woodbine Racetrack; Toronto, Ontario, Canada
- Inaugurated: 1997
- Race type: Thoroughbred - Flat racing
- Website: www.woodbineentertainment.com

Race information
- Distance: Six furlong sprint
- Surface: Tapeta
- Track: left-handed
- Qualification: Fillies & Mares, three-years-old & up (Ontario Sire Stakes program)
- Purse: $100,000 (2021)

The Ballade Stakes is a Canadian Thoroughbred horse race run annually at Woodbine Racetrack in Toronto, Ontario. An Ontario Sire Stakes, it is a restricted race for Fillies and Mares, three-years-old and up.

Normally run in mid June, it is raced over a distance of 6 furlongs on Polytrack.

== Records ==
Speed record: (Through 1998, Woodbine times were recorded in fifths of a second. Since 1999 they are in hundredths of a second)

- 1:09.08 - Brass In Pocket (2004)

Most wins:

- 2 - Barlee Mist (1999, 2000)
- 2 - Mysterious Affair (2001, 2002)
- 2 - Brass In Pocket (2003, 2004)

Most wins by an owner:

- 2 - Barlee Farm (1999, 2000)
- 2 - J. Mort Hardy (2001, 2002)
- 3 - Frank Di Giulio, Jr. (2003, 2004 & 2012)

Most wins by a jockey:

- 3 - Richard Dos Ramos (1998, 2001, 2002)

Most wins by a trainer:

- 3 - Robert P. Tiller (2003, 2004, 2012)

== Winners of the Ballade Stakes ==
Year	Winner	Age	Jockey	Trainer	Owner	Time
2021	Golden Vision	5	Omar Moreno	Tino Attard	Elizabeth and Gordon Lickrish	1:10.75
2015	I'm a Kittyhawk	5	David Moran	Robert Crean	Crean/Earle	1:09.32
2014	Silent Treat	4	Michelle Rainford	Scott Fairlie	Stablemates	1:09:79
2013	Bear's Gem	4	Patrick Husbands	Reade Baker	Bear Stables/Atto	1:11.08
2012	Anywhere	4	Luis Contreras	Robert P. Tiller	Frank D. Di Giulio Jr.	1:09.14
2011	Dancing Raven	4	Luis Contreras	Michael J. Doyle	Windhaven	1:10.16
2010	Impossible Time	5	Jono C. Jones	Roger L. Attfield	Charles E. Fipke	1:08.79
2009	Authenicat	4	Robert Landry	Josie Carroll	Vinery Stables/Fog City Stables	1:10.22
2008	London Snow	5	Steve Bahen	John Charalambous	Kirk Bradden Stables	1:09.82
2007	Financingavailable	6	Todd Kabel	Lorne Richards	K. K. Sangara	1:09.31
2006	Bosskiri	4	Jono Jones	Reade Baker	Harlequin Ranches	1:09.89
2005	Believe In Missy	4	Corey Fraser	Sid C. Attard	Robert Harvey	1:11.38
2004	Brass In Pocket	5	Todd Kabel	Robert P. Tiller	Frank Di Giulio, Jr.	1:09.08
2003	Brass In Pocket	4	David Clark	Robert P. Tiller	Frank Di Giulio, Jr.	1:10.46
2002	Mysterious Affair	5	Richard Dos Ramos	J. Mort Hardy	J. Mort Hardy	1:11.16
2001	Mysterious Affair	4	Richard Dos Ramos	J. Mort Hardy	J. Mort Hardy	1:10.04
2000	Barlee Mist	5	Patrick Husbands	Wray I. Lawrence	Barlee Farm	1:09.89
1999	Barlee Mist	4	Michael Quong	Wray I. Lawrence	Barlee Farm	1:09.29
1998	Angel's Tearlet	5	Richard Dos Ramos	Sid C. Attard	P. & F. O'Brien	1:09.80
1997	Lynclar	5	Steve Bahen	John A. Ross	R M C Stable	1:09.80
