= Seaway Stakes =

- Class: Grade III
- Location: Woodbine Racetrack; Toronto, Ontario
- Inaugurated: 1956
- Race type: Thoroughbred - Flat racing
- Website: www.woodbineentertainment.com

Race information
- Distance: Seven furlong sprint
- Surface: Tapeta
- Track: left-handed
- Qualification: Fillies & Mares, 3-Years-Old & Up
- Weight: Allowances
- Purse: Can$150,000 (since 2005)

The Seaway Stakes is a Thoroughbred horse race run annually in late August or early September at Woodbine Racetrack in Toronto, Ontario, Canada. A Grade III race since 2004, it is open to fillies and mares aged three and older. Contested over a distance of 7 furlongs on Tapeta synthetic dirt, it carries a purse of Can$150,000.

There was no race run in 1965 and 1966. In 1984 it was run in two divisions.

Inaugurated in 1956, over the years the race has been contested at various distances:

- 6 furlongs : 1958-1964
- 6 1/2 furlongs : 2006
- 7 furlongs : 1956–1957, 1967–2005, 2007

== Records ==
Speed record: (Through 1998, times were recorded in fifths of a second . Since 1999 they are in hundredths of a second)

- 1:21.51 - Akronism (2008)

Most wins:

- 3 - Prospective Dolly (1991, 1992, 1994)

Most wins by an owner:

- 4 - Conn Smythe (1970, 1971, 1975, 1976)
- 4 - Live Oak Plantation (2006, 2007, 2020, 2024)

Most wins by a jockey:

- 6 - Robin Platts (1968, 1972, 1979, 1981, 1984, 1985)

Most wins by a trainer:

- 4 - Arthur H. Warner (1961, 1962, 1969, 1983)
- 4 - Donnie Walker (1970, 1971, 1975, 1976)

== Winners of the Seaway Stakes ==
| Year | Winner | Age | Jockey | Trainer | Owner | Time |
|---|---|---|---|---|---|---|
| 2026 | Reagan's Flame | 5 | Edgard J. Zayas | Saffie A. Joseph Jr. | St. Elias Stable, BAG Racing Stables, Turf Express Racing and Watkins Diamond Stables | 1:22.64 |
| 2025 | Elysian Field | 5 | Pietro Moran | Mark E. Casse | Gary Barber and Team Valor International LLC | 1:21.87 |
| 2024 | Ticker Tape Home | 4 | Patrick Husbands | Mark E. Casse | Live Oak Plantation | 1:23.10 |
| 2023 | Ready To Venture (GB) | 5 | Rafael Manuel Hernandez | Michael Stidham | Lael Stables | 1:21.60 |
| 2022 | Lady Speightspeare | 4 | Emma-Jayne Wilson | Roger Attfield | Charles E. Fipke | 1:21.79 |
| 2021 | Boardroom | 4 | Luis Contreras | Josie Carroll | LNJ Foxwoods | 1:22.02 |
| 2020 | Souper Escape | 4 | Luis Contreras | Michael Trombetta | Live Oak Plantation | 1:22.10 |
| 2019 | Alnilah | 5 | Patrick Husbands | Terry Jordan | Canvasback Farms | 1:24.39 |
| 2018 | Code Warrior | 5 | Jesse M. Campbell | Michael P. De Paulo | Zilli Racing Stables | 1:22.35 |
| 2017 | Ami's Mesa | 4 | Luis Contreras | Josie Carroll | Van Dalos | 1:22.17 |
| 2016 | Midnight Miley | 4 | Rafael Manuel Hernandez | Julia Carey | Little Red Feather Racing | 1:22.07 |
| 2015 | Marbre Rose | 4 | Alan Garcia | Christophe Clement | Haras de Saint Pair/Monceaux Stable | 1:22.22 |
| 2014 | Leigh Court | 4 | Gary Boulanger | Josie Carroll | Melnyk Racing Stables | 1:22.27 |
| 2013 | Youcan'tcatchme | 4 | Justin Stein | Sam Di Pasquale | Murray Stroud | 1:22.95 |
| 2012 | Tu Endie Wei | 3 | James McAleney | Reade Baker | Brereton C. Jones | 1:24.12 |
| 2011 | Atlantic Hurricane | 4 | Emile Ramsammy | Stuart Simon | Simon/ B & R McLellan/Hollick | 1:21.88 |
| 2010 | Hooh Why | 4 | Emile Ramsammy | Donald C MacRae | Derby Daze Farm/Hoffman | 1:23.51 |
| 2009 | Tribal Belle | 4 | James McAleney | Terry Jordan | Canvasback Farms | 1:22.44 |
| 2008 | Akronism | 4 | Eurico Rosa da Silva | Tim Ritchey | Robert S. Evans | 1:21.51 |
| 2007 | She's Indy Money | 4 | Patrick Husbands | Malcolm Pierece | Live Oak Plantation | 1:22.54 |
| 2006 | Hide and Chic | 4 | David Clark | Malcolm Pierce | Live Oak Plantation | 1:16.88 |
| 2005 | Fifth Overture | 4 | Robert Landry | Eric Coatrieux | Chiefswood Stable | 1:21.88 |
| 2004 | Brass in Pocket | 4 | Todd Kabel | Robert P. Tiller | Frank Di Giulio Jr. | 1:22.26 |
| 2003 | Brass in Pocket | 3 | David Clark | Robert P. Tiller | Frank Di Giulio Jr. | 1:24.45 |
| 2002 | El Prado Essence | 5 | Todd Kabel | Audre Cappuccitti | A & G. Cappuccitti | 1:24.48 |
| 2001 | El Prado Essence | 4 | Patrick Husbands | Audre Cappuccitti | A & G. Cappuccitti | 1:24.24 |
| 2000 | Saoirse | 4 | David Clark | Phil England | Knob Hill Stable | 1:24.15 |
| 1999 | Gregorian Chance | 3 | Mickey Walls | B. Morgan | D. Morrison & K. Schmidt | 1:22.95 |
| 1998 | Urban Distraction | 3 | Ray Sabourin | Robert P. Tiller | Frank DiGiulio Sr. & Jr. | 1:23.00 |
| 1997 | Santa Amelia | 4 | Robert Landry | Macdonald Benson | Augustin Stable | 1:23.40 |
| 1996 | Ashboro | 3 | Sandy Hawley | Alexander McPherson | Beclawat Stable | 1:22.60 |
| 1995 | Bar U Mood | 5 | Todd Kabel | Daniel J. Vella | Frank Stronach | 1:23.40 |
| 1994 | Prospective Dolly | 7 | Dave Penna | Tino Mattine | Est. M. Rich & partner | 1:22.40 |
| 1993 | Countess Steffi | 4 | Richard Dos Ramos | John Charalambous | Lieberman et al. | 1:23.80 |
| 1992 | Prospective Dolly | 5 | Dave Penna | Tino Mattine | Est. M. Rich & partner | 1:23.80 |
| 1991 | Prospective Dolly | 4 | Mickey Walls | Tino Mattine | N. Clements / Est. M. Rich | 1:24.20 |
| 1990 | Wonchindordor | 4 | Ray Sabourin | Michael Tammaro | Sunlight Farm | 1:23.60 |
| 1989 | Proper Evidence | 4 | Lloyd Duffy | J. Dalton | Schwartz/Gampel | 1:23.60 |
| 1988 | Anglia | 4 | Robbie King, Jr. | N. Smith | Golden Willow Farm | 1:23.60 |
| 1987 | Image Of Class | 4 | Greg Hutton | M. Moncrief | Bender / Hughes | 1:24.00 |
| 1986 | Bessarabian | 4 | Gary Stahlbaum | Michaerl J. Doyle | Eaton Hall Farm | 1:24.60 |
| 1985 | Mrs. Specklewing | 5 | Robin Platts | David MacLean | Norcliffe Stables | 1:23.80 |
| 1984 | Regents Rhythm | 4 | Robin Platts | Roger Attfield | Anderson Farms | 1:24.20 |
| 1984 | Little To Do | 4 | David Clark | George M. Carter | Whitco Farms | 1:25.80 |
| 1983 | Avowal | 4 | Dave Penna | Arthur H. Warner | Richard R. Kennedy | 1:24.00 |
| 1982 | Eternal Search | 4 | Gary Stahlbaum | Edward Mann | Jim Dandy Stable | 1:24.40 |
| 1981 | Hempens Syn | 5 | Robin Platts | Michael Tammaro | Kinghaven Farms | 1:24.00 |
| 1980 | La Voyageuse | 5 | J. Paul Souter | Yonnie Starr | Jean-Louis Levesque | 1:23.20 |
| 1979 | Royal North | 4 | Robin Platts | Gil Rowntree | Stafford Farms | 1:21.80 |
| 1978 | Northern Ballerina | 4 | Sandy Hawley | Gerry Belanger | Frank Stronach | 1:22.80 |
| 1977 | Polder Pie | 4 | Jeffrey Fell | M. R. Clark | M. R. Clark | 1:22.60 |
| 1976 | Bed Shy | 4 | Jeffrey Fell | Donnie Walker | Conn Smythe | 1:23.80 |
| 1975 | Lovely Sunrise | 4 | Brian Swatuk | Donnie Walker | Conn Smythe | 1:24.20 |
| 1974 | Miss Rebound | 6 | Sandy Hawley | Gil Robillard | Grovetree Stable | 1:22.00 |
| 1973 | Levee Luck | 4 | Ted Colangelo | Gil Rowntree | Stafford Farms | 1:25.40 |
| 1972 | Main Pan | 4 | Robin Platts | Odie Clelland | Peter D. Fuller | 1:25.00 |
| 1971 | Not Too Shy | 5 | Richard Grubb | Donnie Walker | Conn Smythe | 1:24.00 |
| 1970 | Not Too Shy | 4 | Brian Swatuk | Donnie Walker | Conn Smythe | 1:22.80 |
| 1969 | Forest Path | 5 | Chris Rogers | Arthur H. Warner | Lanson Farm | 1:26.20 |
| 1968 | Ice Water | 5 | Robin Platts | Lou Cavalaris, Jr. | Gardiner Farm | 1:22.60 |
| 1967 | Kate's Intent | 3 | Hugo Dittfach | Lou Cavalaris, Jr. | Peter D. Fuller | 1:23.40 |
| 1964 | Ramblin Road | 3 | Avelino Gomez | Gordon M. Huntley | Gordon F. Hall | 1:09.40 |
| 1963 | Monarch Park | 4 | Ron Turcotte | Gordon M. Huntley | Addison-Hall Stable | 1:10.20 |
| 1962 | First Minister | 6 | Chris Rogers | Arthur H. Warner | Phil E. Boylen | 1:11.80 |
| 1961 | Anita's Son | 5 | Hugo Dittfach | Arthur H. Warner | Lanson Farm | 1:10.00 |
| 1960 | Bold Scholar | 4 | Hugo Dittfach | A. Chris | Mrs. A. Chris | 1:12.20 |
| 1959 | War Eagle | 5 | Clifford Potts | Lou Cavalaris, Jr. | P. Del Greco | 1:04.80 |
| 1958 | Nearctic | 4 | Ben Sorensen | Gordon J. McCann | Windfields Farm | 1:09.20 |
| 1957 | Hartney | 6 | C. O'Brien | Patrick MacMurchy | Col. K. R. Marshall | 1:23.60 |
| 1956 | Captor | 4 | Avelino Gomez | Gordon J. McCann | E. P. Taylor | 1:24.00 |

== See also ==
- List of Canadian flat horse races
