= Whimsical Stakes =

- Class: Grade III
- Location: Woodbine Racetrack; Toronto, Ontario
- Inaugurated: 1956
- Race type: Thoroughbred - Flat racing
- Website: woodbine.com

Race information
- Distance: Six furlong sprint
- Surface: Tapeta
- Track: Left-handed
- Qualification: Fillies & Mares, 4-Years-Old & Up
- Weight: Allowances
- Purse: $115,500 (2016)

The Whimsical Stakes is a thoroughbred horse race run annually in mid April at Woodbine Racetrack in Toronto, Ontario, Canada. A Grade III race since 2006, it is open to fillies and mares aged four and older. It is raced over a distance of 6 furlongs on Tapeta synthetic dirt and currently carries a purse of $115,500.

Since its inception in 1956 at Toronto's Greenwood Raceway, the race has been contested at various distances:

- 6 furlongs : 1956 at Greenwood Raceway, 1975 at Fort Erie Racetrack, 1976–1979, and since 1986 at Woodbine Racetrack
- 6 1/2 furlongs : 1957 at Greenwood Raceway, 1968-1974 at Fort Erie Racetrack
- 7 furlongs : 1958-1960, 1980-1985 at Greenwood Raceway
- 1 mile : 1961-1966 at Greenwood Raceway
- 1 mile : 1967 on turf at Fort Erie Racetrack

The race was run in two divisions in 1981 and 1984.

== Records ==
Speed record: (at current distance of 6 furlongs)

- 1:08.35 - Boardroom (2021)

Most wins:

- 3 - Prospective Dolly (1991, 1993, 1994)

Most wins by an owner:

- 3 - Estate of M. Rich & N. Clements (1991, 1993, 1994)
- 3 - Larkin Maloney & Conn Smythe (1958, 1959, 1960)
- 3 - Stafford Farm (1966, 1976, 1979)
- 3 - Sam-Son Farms (1983, 1988, 2017)

Most wins by a jockey:

- 6 - Dave Penna (1984, 1987, 1988, 1991, 1993, 1994)
- 6 - Patrick Husbands (2000, 2006, 2012, 2018, 2023, 2024)

Most wins by a trainer:

- 5 - Mark E. Casse (2012, 2018, 2022, 2023, 2024)

== Winners of the Whimsical Stakes ==
Year	Winner	Age	Jockey	Trainer	Owner	Time
2026	Reagan's Flame	5	Sahin Civaci	Saffie A. Joseph Jr.	BAG Racing Stables, Turf Express and Watkins Diamond Stables	1:10.11
2025	Earhart (FR)	4	Rafael Manuel Hernandez	Joise Carroll	LNJ Foxwoods	1:08.84
2024	Play the Music	4	Patrick Husbands	Mark E. Casse	Glassman Racing LLC	1:10.59
2023	Our Flash Drive	5	Patrick Husbands	Mark E. Casse	Live Oak Plantation	1:10.12
2022	Our Secret Agent	5	Kazushi Kimura	Mark Casse	Gary Barber	1:09.62
2021	Boardroom	4	Luis Contreras	Josie Carroll	LNJ Foxwoods	1:08.35
2020	Jean Elizabeth	5	David Moran	Larry Rivelli	R Ravin, Patricia's Hope & L Rivelli	1:09.86
2019	Shakopee Town	4	Alan Garcia	Kevin Attard	Al & Bill Ulwelling	1:09.55
2018	Let It Ride Mom	4	Patrick Husbands	Mark Casse	Live Oak Plantation	1:08.96
2017	Southern Ring	5	Eurico Rosa Da Silva	Malcolm Pierce	Sam-Son Farm	1:09.70
2016	Leigh Court	6	Florent Geroux	Michael Stidham	Speedway Stable	1:08.88
2015	Unspurned	4	Alan Garcia	Roger L. Attfield	Christine Hayden	1:09.18
2014	Purely Hot	6	Chantal Sutherland	Tevis Q. McCauley	Unlimited Equine	1:09.89
2013	Acting Naughty	4	Tyler Pizarro	Donald C. MacRae	John Hillier	1:09.76
2012	Roxy Gap	4	Patrick Husbands	Mark Casse	Eugene Melnyk	1:09.15
2011	Wildcat Marie	4	Tyler Pizarro	Martin Drexler	Baldesarra & Partners	1:09.11
2010	Proud Heiress	6	Chantal Sutherland	Wayne Mogge	Michael Cavey.	1:09.71
2009	Dancing Allstar	4	James McAleney	Terry Jordan	Bob Cheema	1:09.16
2008	My List	4	Eurico Rosa Da Silva	Nicholas Gonzalez	Tucci Stables	1:09.71
2007	Seductively	4	Gerry Olguin	Ian Black	Kinghaven Farms	1:12.27
2006	Abounding Truth	6	Patrick Husbands	Josie Carroll	Douglas Kent Racing	1:10.55
2005	Nashinda	4	David Clark	Macdonald Benson	Augustin Stable	1:11.80
2004	Holy Bubbette	4	Joe Bravo	David Fawkes	Katherine Elam	1:10.37
2003	Brass In Pocket	4	David Clark	Robert P. Tiller	Frank DiGiulio, Jr.	1:12.69
2002	Mysterious Affair	5	Dale Hemsley	J. Mort Hardy	J. Mort Hardy	1:10.54
2001	Mysterious Affair	4	Richard Dos Ramos	J. Mort Hardy	J. Mort Hardy	1:11.78
2000	Barlee Mist	5	Patrick Husbands	Wray I. Lawrence	Barlee Farm	1:10.48
1999	Barlee Mist	4	Michael Quong	Wray I. Lawrence	Barlee Farm	1:10.62
1998	Bimini Blues	5	Sandy Hawley	Michael Mattine	Theodore F. Burnett	1:10.60
1997	Eseni	4	Mickey Walls	Phil England	Knob Hill Stable	1:10.00
1996	Fleet Wahine	5	Robert Landry	Frank A. Passero, Jr.	Frank Stronach	1:11.00
1995	Showering	4	Emile Ramsammy	Michael Mattine	Theodore F. Burnett	1:10.40
1994	Prospective Dolly	7	Dave Penna	Tony Mattine	Est. M. Rich/N. Clements	1:09.80
1993	Prospective Dolly	6	Dave Penna	Tony Mattine	Est. M. Rich/N. Clements	1:10.80
1992	Family Investment	4	Todd Kabel	Michael J. Doyle	L. S. Moore	1:12.20
1991	Prospective Dolly	4	Dave Penna	Tony Mattine	Est. M. Rich/N. Clements	1:12.40
1990	Diva's Debut	4	Richard Dos Ramos	Debbie England	Huntington Stud Farm	1:10.00
1989	Zadracarta	4	Sandy Hawley	Pat Collins	Knob Hill Stable	1:11.00
1988	Ruling Angel	4	Dave Penna	James E. Day	Sam-Son Farm	1:11.60
1987	Dice Cup	4	Dave Penna	David R. Bell	John A. Franks	1:11.40
1986	Quitman	4	David Clark	Tony Mattine	E. H. Curnes	1:11.40
1985	Dancing Emerald	5	Brian Swatuk	Sheldon Wolfe	L. & D. Lee	1:26.40
1984	Mrs. Specklewing	4	Dave Penna	Alton Quanbeck	Norcliffe Stables	1:26.20
1984	Dancing Emerald	4	Robert King, Jr.	Sheldon Wolfe	L. & D. Lee	1:26.00
1983	Tiffany Tam	4	Irwin Driedger	James E. Day	Sam-Son Farm	1:27.00
1982	Eternal Search	4	Gary Stahlbaum	Edward Mann	Jim Dandy Stable	1:27.00
1981	Sober Jig	4	J. Paul Souter	Yonnie Starr	Jean-Louis Levesque	1:26.00
1981	Lacey	4	David Clark	Frank H. Merrill, Jr.	W. P. Gilbride/O'Connell	1:26.60
1980	Kennisis	5	Gary Stahlbaum	Glenn Magnusson	G. Vasey & D. Finn	1:24.40
1979	Royal North	4	Robin Platts	Gil Rowntree	Stafford Farm	1:10.40
1978	Polder Pie	5	Sandy Hawley	M. R. Clark	M. R. Clark	1:10.20
1977	Reasonable Win	5	Avelino Gomez	Fred H. Loschke	Hammer Kopf Farm	1:10.40
1976	Gurkhas Band	4	Robin Platts	Gil Rowntree	Stafford Farms	1:09.80
1975	Lovely Sunrise	4	Colin Bain	Donnie Walker	Conn Smythe	1:11.20
1974	Miss Rebound	6	Sandy Hawley	Gilbert H. Robillard	Grovetree Stable	1:16.80
1973	Sonny Says Quick	8	Gregg McCarron	Odie Clelland	Peter D. Fuller	1:20.40
1972	Main Pan	4	Gregg McCarron	Odie Clelland	Peter D. Fuller	1:16.60
1971	Not Too Shy	5	Richard Grubb	Donnie Walker	Conn Smythe	1:17.40
1970	Anxious Age	7	James Kelly	Andrew G. Smithers	G. W. Bydson	1:18.80
1969	Double Ripple	4	Eldon Nelson	John Tammaro, Jr.	V. Mosca	1:18.60
1968	Anxious Age	5	Clifford Potts	Paul Cooper	G. W. Brydson	1:19.00
1967	Ice Water	4	Avelino Gomez	Lou Cavalaris, Jr.	Gardiner Farm	1:47.20
1966	Sharon Market	4	Avelino Gomez	Carl F. Chapman	Stafford Farms	1:38.20
1965	Battling Way	6	Eric Walsh	N. Fletcher	N. Fletcher	1:40.20
1964	Sky Diver	4	James Fitzsimmons	Jerry C. Meyer	Edward B. Seedhouse	1:38.20
1963	Twice Shy	4	Ron Turcotte	Jerry C. Meyer	H. Waggoner	1:39.00
1962	Scratch Off	4	Jim Parnell	Jerry C. Meyer	D. Mann	1:39.00
1961	Menantic	4	James Fitzsimmons	Gordon J. McCann	Windfields Farm	1:37.80
1960	Wonder Where	4	Clifford Potts	Yonnie Starr	Maloney & Smythe	1:29.40
1959	Kitty Girl	5	Al Coy	Yonnie Starr	Maloney & Smythe	1:25.40
1958	Kitty Girl	4	R. Gonzalez	Yonnie Starr	Maloney & Smythe	1:25.20
1957	Saragino	4	Edward Plesa	Arthur H. Warner	Lanson Farm	1:21.40
1956	Willies Folly	4	Ernie Warme	Jerry C. Meyer	R. Papa	1:12.00

== See also ==
- List of Canadian flat horse races
