= Jerry C. Meyer =

Canadian horse trainer

Jerry Meyer
Personal information
- Born: July 2, 1927 Kitchener, Ontario, Canada
- Died: July 15, 2005 (aged 78) Toronto, Ontario, Canada
- Resting place: Mount Pleasant Cemetery, Toronto, Ontario, Canada
- Occupation: Trainer

Horse racing career
- Sport: Horse racing

Major racing wins
- Clarendon Stakes (1951, 1959, 1962, 1966); Whimsical Stakes (1956, 1962, 1963, 1964); Simcoe Stakes (1962, 1966, 1967, 1969, 1970, 1985); King Edward Stakes (1963, 1977); Coronation Futurity Stakes (1964, 1970, 1971); Cup and Saucer Stakes (1964, 1978); Jockey Club Cup Handicap (1964); Swynford Stakes (1964, 1973); Vandal Stakes (1964, 1966, 1971); Victoria Stakes (1965, 1967, 1971); Plate Trial Stakes (1965, 1967, 1991); Colin Stakes (1966); Grey Stakes (1966); Achievement Stakes (1967); Governor Nicholls Stakes (1967); Woodstock Stakes (1967); Bahamas Stakes (1968); Autumn Stakes (1969, 1976); Governor Stakes (1969); My Dear Stakes (1970); New York Breeders' Futurity (1971); Display Stakes (1973); Toronto Cup Stakes (1973, 1974, 1977); Durham Cup Stakes (1976); Mazarine Stakes (1976); Vigil Stakes (1976); Fury Stakes (1977); Marine Stakes (1977); Selene Stakes (1977); Woodbine Oaks (1977); Summer Stakes (1978); Fort Marcy Stakes (1979); Star Shoot Stakes (1979); Ontario Debutante Stakes (1981); Sapling Stakes (1983); Muskoka Stakes (1984); Fanfreluche Stakes (1991); Nandi Stakes (1991); Victoriana Stakes (2001); Canadian Triple Crown wins: Breeders' Stakes (1965, 1967); Prince of Wales Stakes (1965)

Racing awards
- Canadian Champion Thoroughbred Trainer by wins (1964, 1966, 1969)

Honours
- Canadian Horse Racing Hall of Fame (1999)

Significant horses
- Bold Ruckus, Good Old Mort, Northernette, Pine Point, Smart n Slick, Verbatim

Jerome C. "Jerry" Meyer (July 2, 1927 – July 15, 2005) was a Canadian national champion trainer and Hall of Fame inductee in Thoroughbred racing.

Meyer began his career in racing as a jockey but weight gain soon ended that, and at age 18 he turned to the training end of the business. In 1949 he took out his license and went on to a career that spanned seven decades, both in Canada and the United States.

Based at Woodbine Racetrack in Toronto, Meyer won most every important stakes the track offered at least once, including three of the Canadian Triple Crown races.

Among his early successes in the United States, Meyer won the 1969 inaugural running of the Governor Nicholls Stakes for owner Elmendorf Farm in front of a Labor Day record crowd.

Jerry Meyer died of cancer on July 15, 2005, at Princess Margaret Cancer Centre in Toronto.
