= Prospective Dolly =

American-bred Thoroughbred racehorse

- Sire: Prosperous
- Grandsire: Mr. Prospector
- Dam: Dolly Deb
- Damsire: Villamor
- Sex: Filly
- Foaled: 1987
- Country: United States
- Colour: Chestnut
- Owner: N. Clements/Estate of M. Rich
- Trainer: Tony Mattine
- Record: 50: 22-13-6
- Earnings: $886,614

Major wins
- Ontario Debutante Stakes (1989); My Dear Stakes (1989); Whimsical Stakes (1991, 1993, 1994); Seaway Stakes (1991, 1992, 1994)

Prospective Dolly (foaled 1987 in Florida) is a Thoroughbred racehorse who is best known as a three-time winner of two stakes races. Out of the mare Dolly Deb, she was sired by Prosperous, a stakes winner in Japan who was a son of the very influential sire, Mr. Prospector.

A sprint race specialist, Prospective Dolly was conditioned for racing by Canadian trainer, Tony Mattine. At age two in 1989 the filly won the Ontario Debutante Stakes at Fort Erie Racetrack in Fort Erie, Ontario and the My Dear Stakes at Woodbine Racetrack in Toronto. She was second in the Astoria Stakes at Belmont Park in Elmont, New York.

At age three, Prospective Dolly's best stakes results were second-place finishes in the Miss Woodford Handicap at Monmouth Park Racetrack in New Jersey and the Star Shoot Stakes at Woodbine.

As a four-year-old in 1991, Prospective Dolly won the first of her three Whimsical and Seaway Stakes at Woodbine. The next year, the five-year-old won her second straight Seaway Stakes and ran second in the Whimsical Stakes then in 1993 reversed her position in the two. At age seven in 1994, Prospectice Dolly won both the Whimsical Stakes and Seaway Stakes for the third time in her career.

After retiring from racing, Prospective Dolly stood as a broodmare who produced seven foals.
