= My Dear Stakes =

- Class: Non-graded
- Location: Woodbine Racetrack; Toronto, Ontario, Canada
- Inaugurated: 1941
- Race type: Thoroughbred - Flat racing
- Website: www.woodbineentertainment.com

Race information
- Distance: Five furlong sprint
- Surface: Polytrack
- Track: left-handed
- Qualification: Two-year-old Fillies
- Weight: Allowances
- Purse: $101,000 +
- Bonuses: ($50,000 for Ontario Breds from T.I.P.)

The My Dear Stakes is a Canadian Thoroughbred horse race run annually in late June at Woodbine Racetrack in Toronto, Ontario. Open to two-year-old fillies, it is contested over a distance of five furlongs on Polytrack and currently carries a purse of approximately $101,000 +.

The race was named for the retrospective American Champion Older Female Horse of 1923, My Dear, whose greatest performances came at the Old Woodbine Race Course. Inaugurated at the now defunct Thorncliffe Park Raceway in Toronto, in 1956 the race was moved to the Old Woodbine Race Course then the following year to the newly constructed Woodbine Racetrack. Contested at five furlongs from 1949 through 1968, it was raced at six furlongs from 1969 through 1975. Since 1976 it has been run at its original five furlong distance.

The My Dear Stakes was contested in two divisions in 1953, 1955, 1969, 1979, 1986. There was no race in 1947.

== Records ==
Speed record: (Through 1998, Woodbine times were recorded in fifths of a second. Since 1999 they are in hundredths of a second)

- 0:56.73 - Midst (2009) (at current 5 furlong distance)

Most wins by an owner:

- 5 - Stafford Farms (1961, 1962, 1969, 1971, 1977)

Most wins by a jockey:

- 5 - Robin Platts (1969, 1970, 1977, 1979, 1984)
- 5 - David Clark (1983, 1989, 1999, 2003, 2005)
- 5 - Todd Kabel (1991, 1992, 1996, 2002, 2007)

Most wins by a trainer:

- 7 - John Passero (1951, 1955 (2), 1956, 1959, 1961, 1962)

== Winners of the My Dear Stakes ==
Year	Winner	Jockey	Trainer	Owner	Time
2015	Come to Mischief	Eurico Rosa Da Silva	Steven M. Asmussen	Richard P. Hessee	0:57.19
2014	Unhindered	Luis Contreras	Ralph J. Biamonte	Magers/Marcocchio	0:58.33
2013	Skylander Girl	Emile Ramsammy	Al Patykewich	Alexander Patykewich	0:58.24
2012	Just Got In	Christopher Griffth	Ricky Griffith	Debmar Stables	0:59.11
2011	Tu Endie Wei	Jim McAleney	Reade Baker	Brereton C. Jones	0:56.93
2010	Final Mesa	Eibar Coa	Wesley Ward	Ice Wine Stable	0:57.22
2009	Midst	Patrick Husbands	Mark E. Casse	Lets Go Stable	0:56.73
2008	Juliet's Spirit	Jim McAleney	Steve Asmussen	Padua Stables	0:57.86
2007	Dancing Allstar	Todd Kabel	Terry Jordan	Robert Cheema	0:57.53
2006	Lottacosta	Ray Sabourin	John A. Ross	Jam Jar Racing	0:57.38
2005	Wannatalkaboutme	David Clark	Nicholas Gonzalez	M.A.D. Racing/Gonzalez	0:59.52
2004	Quite a Ruckus	James McKnight	Mark Casse	Richard & Nancy Kaster	0:58.12
2003	Nashinda	David Clark	Macdonald Benson	Augustin Stable	0:58.12
2002	Handpainted	Todd Kabel	Josie Carroll	John & Glen Sikura	0:58.55
2001	Jealous Forum	Patrick Husbands	Mark Casse	Mockingbird Farm Inc.	0:58.79
2000	Caught Out	Robert Landry	Roger Attfield	Harlequin Ranches	0:58.28
1999	Sutter Sutter	David Clark	Mike Doyle	Merrick Jones	0:56.93
1998	Fantasy Lake	Robert Landry	Roger Attfield	Windhaven	0:58.20
1997	Right Regal	Emile Ramsammy	Laurie Silvera	Silverbrook Farm	0:58.40
1996	Diablo's Peac	Todd Kabel	Dan Vella	Frank Stronach	0:58.00
1995	Rosie O'Greta	Dave Penna	Linda Rice	Run For The Roses Inc.	0:58.60
1994	Petrouchka	Larry Attard	Phil England	Knob Hill Stable	0:59.00
1993	Celmis	Dave Penna	Mike Doyle	Eaton Hall Farm	0:59.20
1992	Try In The Sky	Todd Kabel	Laurie Silvera	Black Forest Stables	0:59.40
1991	November Snow	Todd Kabel	Laurie Silvera	Silverbrook Stable	0:59.40
1990	Primarily	Don Seymour	Roger Attfield	Kinghaven Farms	0:58.80
1989	Prospective Dolly	David Clark	Tony Mattine	N. Clements/M. Rich	0:58.80
1988	Lady Summerhill	Lloyd Duffy	Gil Rowntree	Summerhill Farms	1:00.00
1987	Bubba Dulyah	Joe Rocco	Ben Perkins, Jr.	Charlotte C. Polin	0:58.80
1986	Swingin Nickel	Jeff Lloyd	B. Rice	Bwamazon Farm	0:59.20
1986	Casereae	Gary Stahlbaum	Mike Doyle	Eaton Hall Farm	0:59.00
1985	Ice Cream Social	Dan Beckon	Ernie Retamoza	J. Martin	1:00.60
1984	Deceit Dancer	Robin Platts	Gil Rowntree	B. K. Y. Stable	0:59.20
1983	Ada Prospect	David Clark	Gordon Huntley	Schipper/Young/Eaton	0:58.60
1982	Singing Susan	Rudy Turcotte	George Clarke	Robert Quinichette	0:59.00
1981	Subdeb	Diane Crump	Don Divine	Sub-Par Stable	1:00.00
1980	Bude	Brian Swatuk	John Tammaro	Kinghaven Farm	0:59.60
1979	Gemellion	Brian Swatuk	Mike Doyle	Bo-Teek Farm	0:59.00
1979	Solartic	Robin Platts	John Morahan	Douglas Banks	0:58.60
1978	Miss Chief Royal	Dan Beckon	N. Danysh	E. Lieberman	0:58.40
1977	Royal North	Robin Platts	Gil Rowntree	Stafford Farms	0:57.80
1976	Nurso	Richard Grubb	George M. Carter	Whitco Farm	0:59.20
1975	Seraphic	Lloyd Duffy	Penny Ryan	Bo-Teek Farm	1:12.80
1974	Hoso	Rudy Turcotte	Frank Merrill, Jr.	Roxie Gian	1:11.00
1973	Trudie Tudor	Sandy Hawley	John Morahan	Douglas Banks	1:10.80
1972	La Prevoyante	John LeBlanc	Yonnie Starr	Jean-Louis Levesque	1:11.20
1971	Dawn Deluxe	Craig Perret	Gil Rowntree	Stafford Farms	1:11.60
1970	Movette	Robin Platts	Jerry C. Meyer	J. Argo & E. Orzel	1:13.40
1969	Foxy Parent	Lloyd Duffy	W. F. Edmiston	W. F. Edmiston	1:11.60
1969	Tudor Queen	Robin Platts	Gil Rowntree	Stafford Farm	1:21.20
1968	Accumuli	Noel Turcotte	Yonnie Starr	Mrs. F. H. Sherman	0:58.60
1967	Mink Stole	Herb Hinojosa	Carl Chapman	Angrosa Stable	0:58.00
1966	Miss Snow Goose	Hugo Dittfach	Arthur Warner	Lanson Farms	0:59.40
1964	Lady Rhythm	James Fitzsimmons	George M. Carter	J. A. & V. Martin	1:01.60
1963	Famous Road	Keith Roblnson	Yonnie Starr	Conn Smythe	0:58.20
1962	Cesca	Harlon Dalton	John Passero	Stafford Farms	0:58.00
1961	Royal Spirit	Al Coy	John Passero	Stafford Farms	0:59.20
1960	Victoria Regina	Hugo Dittfach	Gordon J. McCann	Windfields Farm	1:00.80
1959	Piagal	C. M. Clark	John Passero	William R. Beasley	0:58.60
1958	Wonder Where	R. Gonzalez	Yonnie Starr	Maloney & Smythe	1:01.00
1957	Tad	Ernie Warme	Gordon Huntley	Kinrara Stable	0:59.60
1956	Silly Lilly	Herb Lindberg	John Passero	William R. Beasley	1:03.00
1955	Dizzy Dora	David Stevenson	John Passero	William R. Beasley	0:59.80
1955	Acushla	David Stevenson	John Passero	William R. Beasley	1:00.40
1954	Flirt	C. Brown	James C. Bentley	Winnifred Taylor	0:59.80
1953	Shine Ever	Jose Vina	Gordon J. McCann	E. P. Taylor	1:02.00
1953	My Wind	Jose Vina	Gordon J. McCann	E. P. Taylor	1:02.00
1952	Oriole Lass	M. Mafale	Patrick MacMurchy	Maud McDougald	0:59.40
1951	French Lace	Alf Bavington	John Passero	Bill Beasley Stable	1:01.40
1950	Sis Bunty	Pat Remillard	William Thurner	J. M. Dugdale	1:02.00
1949	Balladette	H. Wallace	F. Sharpe	M. C. Haddix	1:00.20
1948	Bolaris	Robert Watson	A. Chris	S. Chris	1:13.40
1946	Lochiel Lass	J. Reynolds	Arthur Brent	Parkwood Stable	1:12.80
1945	Willegivit	J. Cowley	E. Rickard	N. L. Heise	1:16.40
1944	Sure Delight	Pat Remillard	H. McDonald	Mrs. T. Stevenson	1:12.80
1943	Sand Storm	S. Denny Birley	Red Barnard	Van Dyke Stable	1:12.80
1942	Mono Miller	Robert Watson	Robert K. Hodgson	L. McCarthy	1:13.00
1941	Air Sure	Charlie McTague	M. Nichols	Conn Smythe	1:13.40
