= Bessarabian Stakes =

- Class: Grade II Stakes
- Location: Woodbine Racetrack; Toronto, Ontario, Canada
- Inaugurated: 1985
- Race type: Thoroughbred - Flat racing
- Website: http://www.woodbineentertainment.com

Race information
- Distance: 7 furlongs
- Surface: Tapeta synthetic dirt
- Track: left-handed
- Qualification: Fillies & mares, three-years-old & up
- Weight: Allowance
- Purse: Can$200,000 (since 2014)
- Bonuses: $23,265 for Ontario-bred horses from the T.I.P.)

The Bessarabian Stakes is a Canadian Thoroughbred horse race run annually since 1985 at Woodbine Racetrack in Toronto, Ontario. Raced at a distance of seven furlongs, it is held during the latter part of November and is open to fillies and mares, age three and older. It has been a Grade II event since 2013.

== History ==
Inaugurated in 1985 as the Etobicoke Handicap, in 1996 it was renamed in honor of Eaton Hall Farm's Champion filly, Bessarabian.

Through 1990 the race was contested at six furlongs on dirt. In 2006 the track surface was replaced with a Polytrack synthetic dirt which would be changed again in 2016 to Tapeta synthetic dirt. (both referred to as an "all weather track" in official charts). The purse for the Bessarabian was increased to $200,000 in 2014, plus up to $23,265 for Ontario-bred horses.

== Records ==
Speed record:

- 1:20.76 - Our Flash Drive (2020) at current distance of 7 furlongs

Most wins:

- 2 - Count On A Change (1991, 1992)
- 2 - Early Blaze (1994, 1995)
- 2 - Moonlit Promise (2017, 2018)
- 2 - Pondering (2025, 2026)

Most wins by an owner:

- 3 - Huntington Stud Farm (1990, 1991, 1992)
- 3 - Kinghaven Farms (1985, 1986, 1993)

Most wins by a jockey:

- 4 - Jim McAleney (1993, 2002, 2006, 2013)
- 4 - Eurico Rosa da Dilva (2007, 2015, 2018, 2019)

Most wins by a trainer:

- 4 - Josie Carroll (2008, 2017, 2018, 2023)
- 4 - Roger Attfield (1985, 1986, 1993, 2021)

== Winners ==
Year	Winner	Age	Jockey	Trainer	Owner	Time
2026	Pondering	4	Sahin Civaci	Brendan P. Walsh	Godolphin	1:23.07
2025	Pondering	3	Declan Cannon	Brendan P. Walsh	Godolphin LLC	1:23.34
2024	Stormcast	3	Rafael Hernandez	Mark E. Casse	KEM Stables	1:22.43
2023	Loyalty	4	Kazushi Kimura	Josie Carroll	Gainesway Farm & LNJ Foxwoods	1:22.27
2022	Our Flash Drive	4	Patrick Husbands	Mark E. Casse	Live Oak Plantation	1:20.76
2021	Lady Speightspeare	3	Emma-Jayne Wilson	Roger Attfield	Charles E. Fipke	1:21.03
2020	Artie's Princess	3	Kazushi Kimura	Wesley Ward	Kenneth and Sarah Ramsey	1:20.90
2019	Amalfi Coast	3	Eurico Rosa da Silva	Kevin Attard	Terra Racing Stable	1:22.03
2018	Moonlit Promise	5	Eurico Rosa da Silva	Josie Carroll	Hill 'n' Dale Farms & Windsor Boys	1:22.28
2017	Moonlit Promise	4	Gary Boulanger	Josie Carroll	Hill 'n' Dale Farms & Windsor Boys	1:21.79
2016	River Maid	4	Gary Boulanger	Robert P. Tiller	The Very Dry Stable	1:21.85
2015	Miss Mischief	5	Eurico Rosa Da Silva	Dale Capuano	Diane Manning	1:21.72
2014	Hillaby	4	Patrick Husbands	Mark E. Casse	Stonestreet Stables	1:21.44
2013	Part the Seas	4	James McAleney	Michael P. De Paulo	Bear Stables	1:22.31
2012	Magic Broomstick	6	Emma-Jayne Wilson	Malcolm Pierce	Sam-Son Farms	1:22.29
2011	Atlantic Hurricane	5	Emile Ramsammy	Stuart C. Simon	McLellans/Hollick/Simon	1:21.77
2010	Ariana D	4	Omar Moreno	Laurie Silvera	William Thompson Jr.	1:22.97
2009	Tribal Belle	4	James McAleney	Terry Jordan	Canvasback Farms	1:22.29
2008	Smart Surprise	4	Robert Landry	Josie Carroll	John G. Sikura	1:22.14
2007	My List	3	Eurico Rosa Da Silva	Nick Gonzalez	Tucci Stables	1:21.50
2006	Financingavailable	5	Jim McAleney	Lorne Richards	K. K. Sangara	1:22.82
2005	Miss Concerto	4	Corey Fraser	Sid Attard	Tucci Stables	1:25.00
2004	Miss Grindstone	5	Ray Sabourin	Frank A. Passero, Jr.	William G. Robbins	1:23.21
2003	Winter Garden	3	David Clark	Robert P. Tiller	Frank D. DiGiulio, Jr.	1:24.14
2002	Sheila's Prospect	4	Jim McAleney	Lorne Richards	K. K. Sangara	1:22.98
2001	Elektraline	5	Gary Boulanger	Michael Wright, Jr.	Richard A. Englander	1:22.38
2000	Feathers	3	Mickey Walls	Ralph Biamonte	Tooth & Nail Stable	1:23.93
1999	Barlee Mist	4	Patrick Husbands	Wray I. Lawrence	Barlee Farm	1:23.50
1998	Santa Amelia	5	Robert Landry	Macdonald Benson	Augustin Stable	1:22.40
1997	Autumn Slew	4	Todd Kabel	Macdonald Benson	Augustin Stable	1:23.40
1996	Flat Fleet Feet	3	Mike E. Smith	John Kimmel	C. Kimmel/P. & L. Solondz	1:23.20
1995	Early Blaze	5	Lloyd Duffy	Brian Ottaway	Ken Ham	1:23.80
1994	Early Blaze	4	Lloyd Duffy	Brian Ottaway	Ken Ham	1:23.20
1993	Sing And Swing	4	Jim McAleney	Roger Attfield	Kinghaven Farms	1:23.20
1992	Count On A Change	5	Robin Platts	John A. Ross	Huntington Stud Farm	1:23.80
1991	Count On A Change	4	Dave Penna	Debbie England	Huntington Stud Farm	1:24.40
1990	Diva's Debut	4	Richard Dos Ramos	Debbie England	Huntington Stud Farm	1:10.00
1989	Blushing Katy	3	Gunnar Lindberg	Phil England	Kingsbrook Farm	1:10.60
1988	Zadracarta	3	Richard Dos Ramos	Patrick Collins	Knob Hill Stable	1:10.40
1987	Ruling Angel	3	Dave Penna	James E. Day	Sam-Son Farm	1:10.80
1986	Playlist	3	Richard Dos Ramos	Roger Attfield	Kinghaven Farms	1:11.20
1985	Summer Mood	4	Jack Lauzon	Roger Attfield	Kinghaven Farms	1:12.00

== See also ==
- List of Canadian flat horse races
