= James S. McAleney =

Canadian jockey

James McAleney
Personal information
- Born: August 15, 1969 (age 57) Fort St. John, British Columbia, Canada
- Occupation: Jockey

Horse racing career
- Sport: Horse racing
- Career wins: 2,000+

Major racing wins
- Glorious Song Stakes (1987, 1990); Coronation Futurity Stakes (1988, 1995, 2013); Display Stakes (1988); New Providence Stakes (1988, 1989, 1994); Highlander Stakes (1989); Kennedy Road Stakes (1989); Maple Leaf Stakes (1989, 1996); Play The King Stakes (1989); Sky Classic Stakes (1989); Victoriana Stakes (1989, 1990, 1999, 2006, 2007); Vigil Stakes (1989, 1990, 2010); Selene Stakes (1992, 2005); Achievement Stakes (1993, 2006); Bessarabian Stakes (1993, 2002, 2006, 2013); Woodstock Stakes (1993, 1999); Autumn Stakes (1994, 2007); Monmouth Breeders' Cup Oaks (1995); Colin Stakes (1998); Col. R. S. McLaughlin Stakes (1998); Summer Stakes (1999, 2005); Bunty Lawless Stakes (2000, 2002); Dance Smartly Handicap (2000, 2002); Wonder Where Stakes (2001); Marine Stakes (2002, 2009); Grey Breeders' Cup Stakes (2003); Sir Barton Stakes (2003, 2007); Alywow Stakes (2004); Canadian Derby (2004); Connaught Cup Stakes (2004); King Edward Stakes (2004); Nandi Stakes (2004, 2005, 2009); Nearctic Stakes (2004); Mazarine Stakes (2005); Singspiel Stakes (2005); Swynford Stakes (2005); Woodbine Oaks (2005); La Lorgnette Stakes (2006); Duchess Stakes (2006); Eclipse Stakes (2008); Bison City Stakes (2008); My Dear Stakes (2008); Deputy Minister Stakes (2009); Seaway Stakes (2009); Whimsical Stakes (2009); Victoria Park Stakes (2009) Ontario Debutante Stakes ( 2008, 2011, 2013, 2016 ) Canadian Classic Race wins: Breeders' Stakes (2001), Prince of Wales Stakes (2015)

Racing awards
- Canadian Champion Apprentice Jockey (1987, 1988)

Significant horses
- With Approval, Steady Power, Sweetest Thing; Organ Grinder, True Metropolitan

James S. "Jim" McAleney (born August 15, 1969 in Fort St. John, British Columbia) is a Canadian Thoroughbred horse racing jockey.

A native of Fort St. John, British Columbia, Jim McAleney began his career as a jockey in Western Canada where in 1986 at Northlands Park in Edmonton, Alberta he got his first win. The following year, he competed in the West as well as in Ontario. For the year he finished sixth in wins among all jockeys in North America, a performance that earned him the Sovereign Award for Outstanding Apprentice Jockey.

Based in Toronto in 1988, he raced at Greenwood Raceway and at Woodbine Racetrack and repeated as Champion apprentice that year.

Consistently among the top jockeys in Ontario, Jim McAleney has also won races Monmouth Park and Keeneland Race Course and other tracks in the United States. In 2001, he won his first Canadian Classic Race when he rode Sweetest Thing to victory in the Breeders' Stakes.

In 2004, McAleney returned to Northlands Park to compete in the Canadian Derby, winning the race aboard Organ Grinder. In 2007, he broke his leg two days before the start of the season and was out until August 15. On his return, he won Woodbine Racetrack's Victoriana Stakes for a record fifth time.

As at August 6, 2008 McAleney is the leading jockey at Woodbine Racetrack.

Chart (2000–present)	Peak position
National Earnings List for Jockeys 2000	83
National Earnings List for Jockeys 2001	90
National Earnings List for Jockeys 2002	33
National Earnings List for Jockeys 2003	27
National Earnings List for Jockeys 2004	31
National Earnings List for Jockeys 2005	34
National Earnings List for Jockeys 2006	39
National Earnings List for Jockeys 2008	21
National Earnings List for Jockeys 2009	36
National Earnings List for Jockeys 2010	56
National Earnings List for Jockeys 2011	84
