= Bessarabian (racehorse) =

American-bred Thoroughbred racehorse

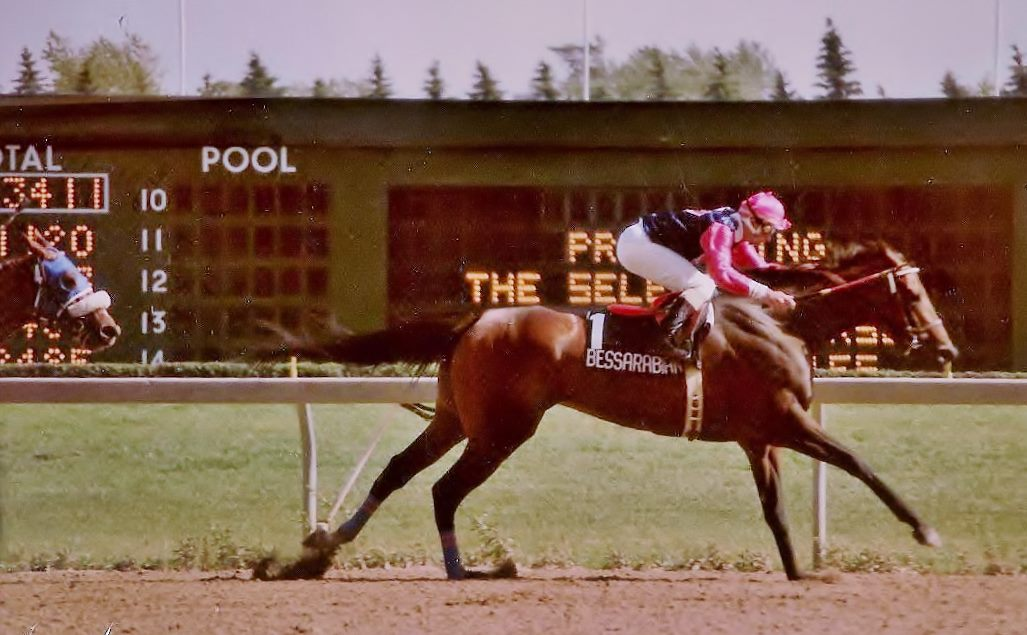
- Bessarabian winning Selene Stakes, 1985 (Woodbine)
- Sire: Vice Regent
- Grandsire: Northern Dancer
- Dam: Tete de Linotte
- Damsire: Turn-To
- Sex: Filly
- Foaled: 1982
- Country: United States
- Colour: Bay
- Breeder: Welcome Farm (Richard Winn)
- Owner: Eaton Hall Farm
- Trainer: Michael J. Doyle
- Record: 37: 18-5-4
- Earnings: $1,032,640

Major wins
- Gardenia Stakes (1984); Ontario Debutante Stakes (1984); Mazarine Stakes (1984); Selene Stakes (1985); Lady Angela Stakes (1985); Ontario Colleen Handicap (1985); Hibiscus Stakes (1985); Woodbine Breeders' Cup Stakes (1986); Ontario Matron Stakes (1986); Seaway Stakes (1986); Canadian Stakes (1986); Tattling Handicap (1986)

Awards
- Canadian Champion Older Female Horse (1986)

Honours
- Bessarabian Stakes at Woodbine Racetrack

Bessarabian (foaled 1982 in Pennsylvania) is a Canadian Champion Thoroughbred racehorse. Owned by Thor Eaton's Eaton Hall Farm, the Eaton family member entrusted her race conditioning to Mike Doyle. The millionaire granddaughter of Northern Dancer, Bessarabian raced in Canada and the United States.

== Racing career ==
As a two-year-old, Bessarabian had an outstanding season with wins in the Ontario Debutante and Mazarine Stakes. Sent to compete in the United States, on October 26 she scored an impressive victory at Garden State Park, winning the $200,000 G2 Gardenia Stakes by more than nine lengths. That performance would see Bessarabian sent off as the parimutuel betting favorite in the 1984 inaugural running of the Breeders' Cup Juvenile Fillies held that year at California's Hollywood Park Racetrack. However, coming out of the first turn of the race, Fran's Valentine veered wide and knocked another horse off stride and into Bessarabian who never recovered and finished fifth. Fran's Valentine won the race but was disqualified and the win awarded to runner-up, Outstandingly.

Bessarabian began her 1985 three-year-old campaign with a win in the Hibiscus Stakes at Florida's Hialeah Park Racetrack. Returned north to Canada, she was the winner of three important stakes at Woodbine Racetrack.

Following her most successful year in racing, four-year-old Bessarabian was voted the 1986 Sovereign Award for Champion Older Female Horse. She was then retired from racing having won eighteen of her thirty-seven starts.

Retired to broodmare duty, Bessarabian produced four foals, the most successful of which in racing was probably Dagda, a stakes-winning gelding born in 1992 sired by Alysheba.

In 1996, the Woodbine track renamed the Etobicoke Handicap in her honor.

== Pedigree ==
Pedigree of Bessarabian, bay mare, 1982
Sire Vice Regent	Northern Dancer	Nearctic	Nearco
Sire Vice Regent	Northern Dancer	Nearctic	Lady Angela
Sire Vice Regent	Northern Dancer	Natalma	Native Dancer
Sire Vice Regent	Northern Dancer	Natalma	Almahmoud
Sire Vice Regent	Victoria Regina	Menetrier	Fair Copy
Sire Vice Regent	Victoria Regina	Menetrier	La Melodie
Sire Vice Regent	Victoria Regina	Victoriana	Windfields
Sire Vice Regent	Victoria Regina	Victoriana	Iribelle
Dam Tete de Linotte	Turn-To	Royal Charger	Nearco
Dam Tete de Linotte	Turn-To	Royal Charger	Sun Princess
Dam Tete de Linotte	Turn-To	Source Sucree	Admiral Drake
Dam Tete de Linotte	Turn-To	Source Sucree	Lavendula
Dam Tete de Linotte	Pink Nightie	Windfields	Bunty Lawless
Dam Tete de Linotte	Pink Nightie	Windfields	Nandi
Dam Tete de Linotte	Pink Nightie	Pink Sapphire	Vincentive
Dam Tete de Linotte	Pink Nightie	Pink Sapphire	Lump Sugar (family: 5-g)
