= Kingarvie Stakes =

- Class: Restricted Stakes
- Location: Woodbine Racetrack; Toronto, Ontario, Canada
- Inaugurated: 1975
- Race type: Thoroughbred - Flat racing
- Website: www.woodbineentertainment.com

Race information
- Distance: 1 1/16 miles (8.5 furlongs)
- Surface: Polytrack
- Track: left-handed
- Qualification: Two-year-olds (Ontario Sire Stakes program)
- Weight: Allowances
- Purse: $94,913 (2016)

The Kingarvie Stakes is a thoroughbred horse race run annually in late November/early December at Woodbine Racetrack in Toronto, Ontario, Canada. An Ontario Sire Stakes, it is a restricted race for two-year-old horses. Raced over a distance of 1 1/16 miles on Polytrack, the Kingarvie Stakes currently carries a purse of $94,913.

Inaugurated in 1975 at Greenwood Raceway as a one mile event, it was competed there until 1994 when it was moved to Woodbine Racetrack and set at a distance of 1 1/16 miles.

The race was named to honor Col. Samuel McLaughlin's Canadian Horse Racing Hall of Fame horse, Kingarvie.

== Winners ==
- 2018 - Dotted Line
- 2018 - Dun Drum
- 2017 - SIlent Sting
- 2016 - Jurojin (Luis Contreras)
- 2015 - Amis Gizmo (Luis Contreras)
- 2014 - Kingsport (Jesse M. Campbell)
- 2013 - Spadina Road
- 2012 - Pyrite Mountain
- 2011 - Run in Aruba
- 2010 - Pender Harbour
