= Gordon J. McCann =

Canadian racehorse trainer

Personal information
- Born: February 18, 1908 East York, Ontario, Canada
- Died: January 18, 2000 (aged 91)
- Occupation: Jockey / Trainer

Horse racing career
- Sport: Horse racing
- Career wins: Not found

Major racing wins
- Canadian International Stakes (1941, 1951, 1953); Autumn Stakes (1949); Coronation Futurity Stakes (1950, 1952, 1956, 1968); Cup and Saucer Stakes (1952, 1958, 1968); Plate Trial Stakes (1952 (2x), 1953, 1954 (2x), 1957 (2x), 1960, 1963); My Dear Stakes (1953 (2x), 1960); Toronto Cup (1953, 1954, 1956); Achievement Stakes (1954, 1957, 1961); Maple Leaf Stakes (1954, 1958); Jacques Cartier Stakes (1955, 1957, 1958); Clarendon Stakes (1956, 1958); Niagara Handicap (1956, 1959); Saratoga Special Stakes (1956); Seaway Stakes (1956, 1958); Victoria Stakes (1956, 1958); Woodbine Oaks (1957, 1960, 1970); Nassau Stakes (1958); Star Shoot Stakes (1958, 1960, 1961, 1966, 1969); Seagram Cup (1959); Nettie Handicap (1961) Canadian Classic Race wins: Queen's Plate (1940, 1951, 1953, 1957, 1959, 1963); Prince of Wales Stakes (1951, 1952, 1954, 1959, 1961, 1963, 1967); Breeders' Stakes (1954, 1959, 1961, 1963)

Racing awards
- Oriental Park Racetrack Champion Jockey (1926)

Honours
- Canadian Horse Racing Hall of Fame (1979)

Significant horses
- Willie the Kid, Bunty Lawless, Queen's Own; Bull Page, Nearctic, New Providence; Canebora, Major Factor, Lyford Cay; Canadiana, Victoria Park, Viceregal, Vice Regent

Gordon J. "Pete" McCann (1908 – January 18, 2000) was a Canadian Thoroughbred horse trainer. He was born in East York, now part of the city of Toronto. Known to his family as Gordon, in racing circles he was nicknamed Pete.

Pete McCann began his career as a jockey. He raced at Oriental Park Racetrack in Havana, Cuba where he was a leading jockey in 1926. He rode with success in Toronto then in 1940 took out his trainer's license and won his first King's Plate that same year with Willie the Kid.

McCann was hired by E. P. Taylor as head trainer at Windfields Farm in 1950 where he would spend the next twenty-one years. During his training career, McCann conditioned seven Canadian Hall of Fame horses and six horses that won Canadian Horse of the Year honours including Canadian Triple Crown winners New Providence in 1959 and Canebora in 1963. He also trained six winners of Canada's most prestigious race, the Queen's Plate and overall won seventeen races that now comprise the Canadian Classics. He also is tied for having trained the most winners with three in the Canadian International Stakes.

In 1971, McCann retired from training after Taylor divided the stable into Canadian and United States divisions under separate head trainers. Quickly bored, he returned to racing with a small stable of his own.

McCann was inducted into the Canadian Horse Racing Hall of Fame in 1979. He died of pneumonia at age 91.
