= Josie Carroll =

Canadian horse trainer

Personal information
- Born: December 8, 1957 (age 68) Scarborough, Ontario, Canada
- Occupation: Trainer

Horse racing career
- Sport: Horse racing
- Career wins: 1000+ (ongoing)

Major racing wins
- Marine Stakes (1995, 2008); Queenston Stakes (1995); Woodstock Stakes (1995); Achievement Stakes (1998); Toronto Cup Stakes (1998); Delaware Oaks (1999, 2009); Victoria Stakes (2000, 2005); Glorious Song Stakes (2001, 2002); Lecomte Stakes (2001); Sugar Bowl Handicap (2001); My Dear Stakes (2002); Ontario Debutante Stakes (2002); Black Gold Stakes (2003); La Lorgnette Stakes (2003, 2011); Mazarine Stakes (2003, 2015, 2019); Summer Stakes (2003); Colin Stakes (2005); Maple Leaf Stakes (2005, 2017); Whimsical Stakes (2006); Shady Well Stakes (2007); Display Stakes (2008); Belle Mahone Stakes (2008); Canadian Derby (2008); Manitoba Derby (2008); Cotillion Handicap (2009); Alabama Stakes (2009); Seagram Cup Stakes (2011, 2019, 2020); Woodbine Oaks (2011, 2020); Gulfstream Park Turf Handicap (2016); Ontario Derby (2016); Bessarabian Stakes (2017, 2018); Connaught Cup Stakes (2021); Autumn Stakes (2021); Nearctic Stakes (2021); Royal North Stakes (2022); Jacques Cartier Stakes (2023); Eclipse Stakes (2023) Canadian Triple Crown wins: King's Plate (2006, 2011, 2020, 2026); Prince of Wales Stakes (2016, 2020, 2022); Breeders' Stakes (2014, 2020)

Honours
- Canadian Horse Racing Hall of Fame (2019)

Significant horses
- Tethra, Edenwold, Careless Jewel, Inglorious, Amis Gizmo, Mighty Heart

Josie Carroll (born December 8, 1957) is a Canadian Thoroughbred horse trainer, who in 2006 became the first woman trainer to win the Queen's Plate, Canada's oldest and most prestigious thoroughbred horse race. She also won the Queen's Plate (now King's Plate) in 2011, 2020 and 2026, the Prince of Wales Stakes in 2016 and 2020, and the Breeder's Stakes in 2014 and 2020.

Born in Scarborough, Ontario, Carroll undertook an equine studies course at Humber College before embarking on a racing career in 1975 in the employ of Canadian Horse Racing Hall of Fame trainer Mac Benson at Windfields Farm. She worked as an assistant trainer until 1994. She had early success with Tethra, owned by members of the prominent Eaton family.

From a young age she followed horse racing and clipped race results from the newspaper as a hobby.

In recent years she has been one of the leading trainers at Woodbine Racetrack in Toronto and has won a number of graded stakes races both in Canada and in the United States.

Prior to the 2006 winning run, she had had one horse compete in the Queen's Plate. Her 2006 entry, Edenwold, earned the Sovereign Award as Canada's top two-year-old in 2005, but observers of the sport believed the colt could not sustain the Queen's Plate distance of a mile and a quarter. Ridden by jockey Emile Ramsammy, her winning horse was considered a long shot, going off at 16-1 odds in the $1 million Grade I Queen's Plate.

Carroll's first Grade I win came in 2009 with Careless Jewel, who won the Alabama Stakes.

Carroll is the second female trainer to take Canada's most prestigious race for three-year-old fillies, the Woodbine Oaks with Inglorious in 2011 – who went on to win the Queen's Plate for Carroll that same year. She again won the Woodbine Oaks in 2020 with Curlin's Voyage.

In 2019, she was inducted into the Canadian Horse Racing Hall of Fame.

== Canadian Triple Crown ==
Prior to the 2006 winning run, she had had one horse compete in the Queen's Plate. Her 2006 entry, Edenwold, earned the Sovereign Award as Canada's top two-year-old in 2005, but observers of the sport believed the colt could not sustain the Queen's Plate distance of a mile and a quarter. Ridden by jockey Emile Ramsammy, her winning horse was considered a long shot, going off at 16-1 odds in the $1 million Grade I Queen's Plate.

In 2020, Josie Carroll won all three of the Canadian Triple Crown series. She won the first two with Mighty Heart and the third with stablemate Belichick.
