= Woodbine Racetrack =

Canadian casino and horse racing track

Coordinates: 43°42′45.09″N 79°36′7.35″W

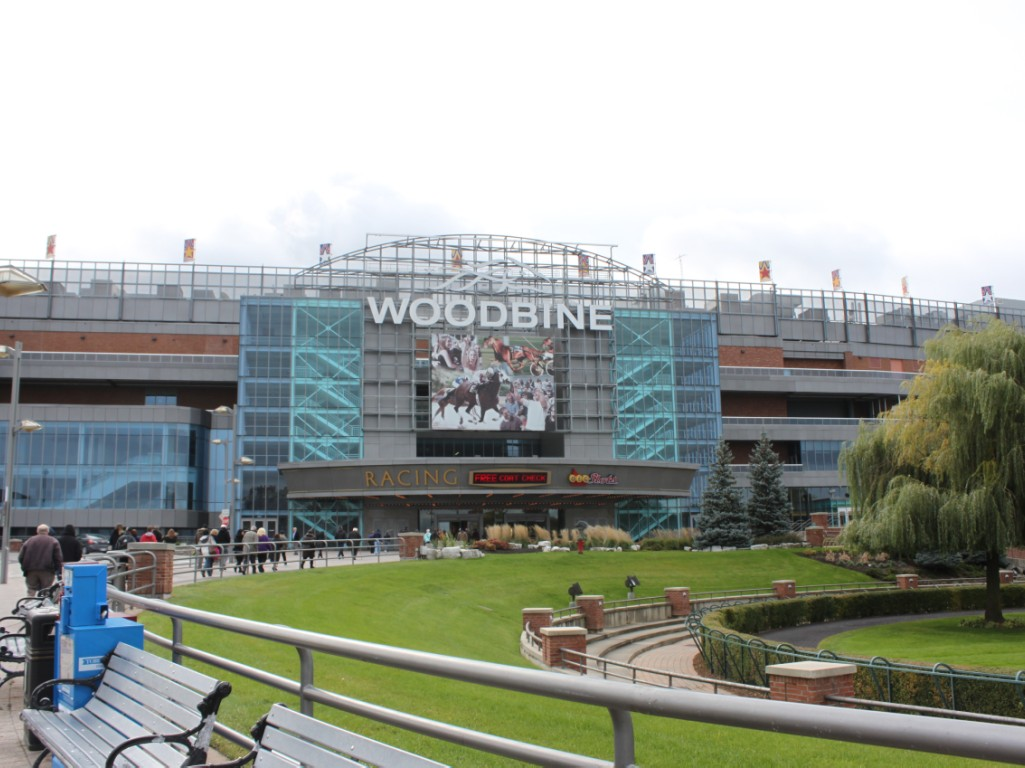
- Exterior entrance of Woodbine Racetrack
- Interactive map of Woodbine Racetrack
- Location: 555 Rexdale Boulevard; Toronto, Ontario, Canada
- Owned by: Woodbine Entertainment Group
- Date opened: June 12, 1956
- Capacity: 42,000
- Course type: Flat
- Notable races: Canadian International Stakes (Grade I); King's Plate; Breeders' Stakes; Woodbine Mile (Grade I); E.P. Taylor Stakes (Grade I); Nearctic Stakes (Grade I); Northern Dancer Turf Stakes (Grade I)

Woodbine Racetrack is a race track for Thoroughbred horse racing in the Etobicoke area of Toronto, Ontario, Canada. Owned by Woodbine Entertainment Group, Woodbine Racetrack manages and hosts Canada's most famous race, the King's Plate. The track was opened in 1956 with a one-mile oval dirt track, as well as a seven-eights turf course. It has been extensively remodeled since 1993, and since 1994 has had three racecourses.

== History ==
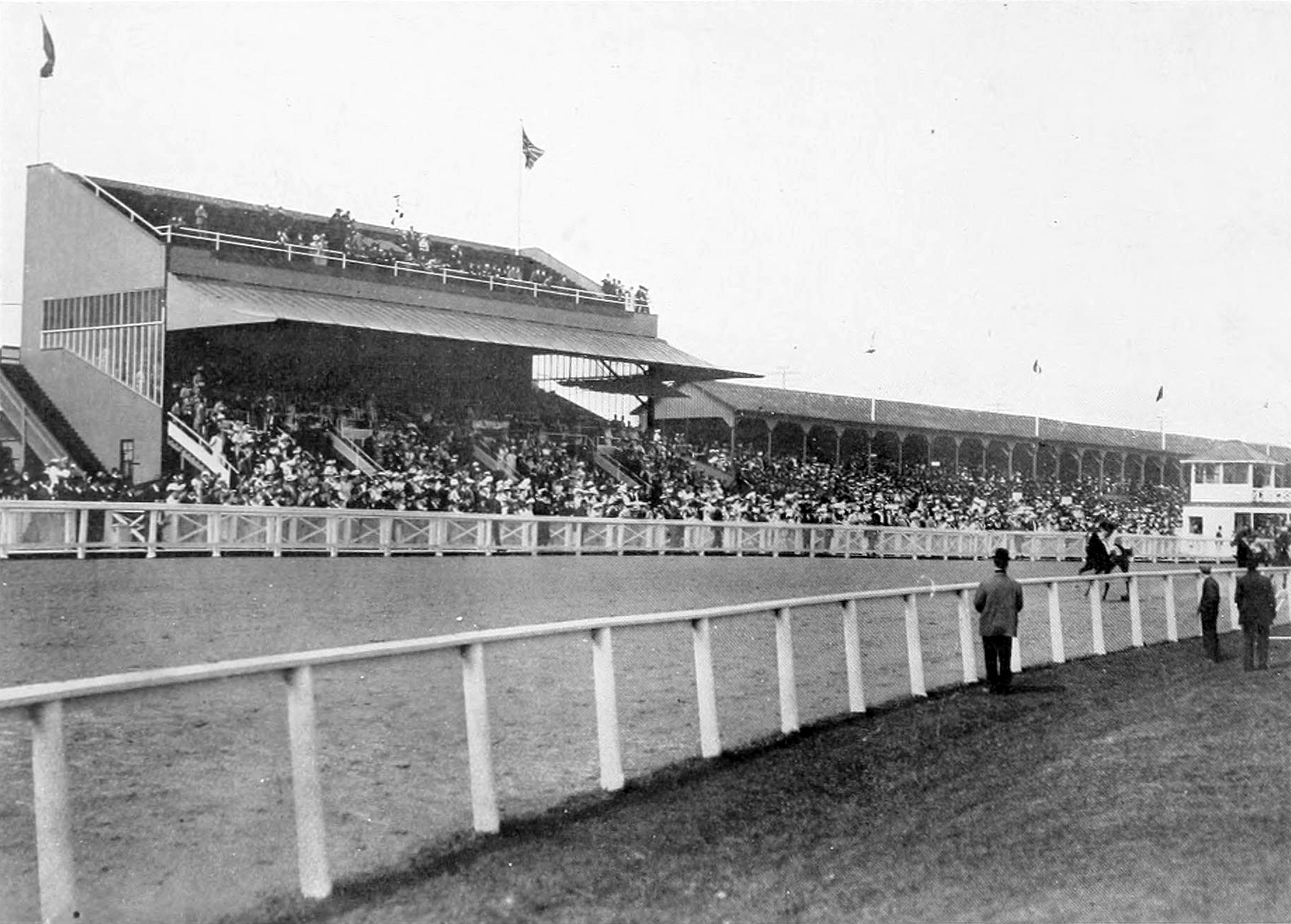
The original Woodbine Race Course in 1909. The current Woodbine Racetrack owes its namesake to the original race course.

The current Woodbine carries the name originally used by a racetrack which operated in southeast Toronto, at Queen Street East and Kingston Road, from 1874 through 1993. (While the Old Woodbine Race Course was at the south end of Woodbine Avenue, the current Woodbine is nowhere near it.) In 1951, it was operated by the Ontario Jockey Club (OJC) and held the prestigious King's Plate, but it competed with several other racetracks in Ontario and was in need of modernization.

During the 1950s, the OJC, under the leadership of Canadian industrialist and horse breeder E.P. Taylor, began a program of racetrack acquisitions aimed at becoming the biggest and most profitable operator in Ontario horse racing, similar to Taylor's earlier acquisitions and consolidations in the Canadian brewing industry. In 1952, the OJC purchased and closed the money-losing Thorncliffe Park, purchased and closed the Hamilton Racetrack, and purchased the Fort Erie Racetrack for CA$780,000. Renovations began immediately at Fort Erie and at Woodbine, financed by a public offering of stock for CA$2 million.

In 1953, the OJC bought Stamford Park in Stamford township (now part of Niagara Falls, Ontario). It was closed and later redeveloped into a residential subdivision. In 1955, Taylor himself purchased the competing Orpen-owned Dufferin Park Racetrack and Long Branch Racetracks for CA$4 million ($46.6 million in 2025 dollars). The Orpen tracks were closed and redeveloped, and the Orpen race charters transferred to the OJC. The OJC continued the Canadian International and Cup and Saucer stakes races that had been held at the Orpen tracks. The racing charters acquired from the other tracks enabled the OJC to run 196 days of racing, more than double its allowed total of 84 days in 1952.

All of the efforts at racetrack acquisitions and closures were designed to support a new "supertrack". In 1952, the OJC identified the new location of the racetrack at Highway 27 east of the Toronto airport and bought over 400 acres (160 ha). The architect chosen was Earle C. Morgan. Although Morgan had not designed a racetrack, he spent the next two years developing the design in conjunction with Arthur Froelich, who had designed Hollywood Park Racetrack and Garden State Park Racetrack in the United States. The new track was designed to hold 40,000 spectators, have ample parking, three race courses and two training tracks. It had stable space for 1,000 horses and rooms for 700 employees. The grandstand, designed to get as many people as close to the finish line as possible, included several restaurants and cafeterias. Construction on the new supertrack began in 1955.

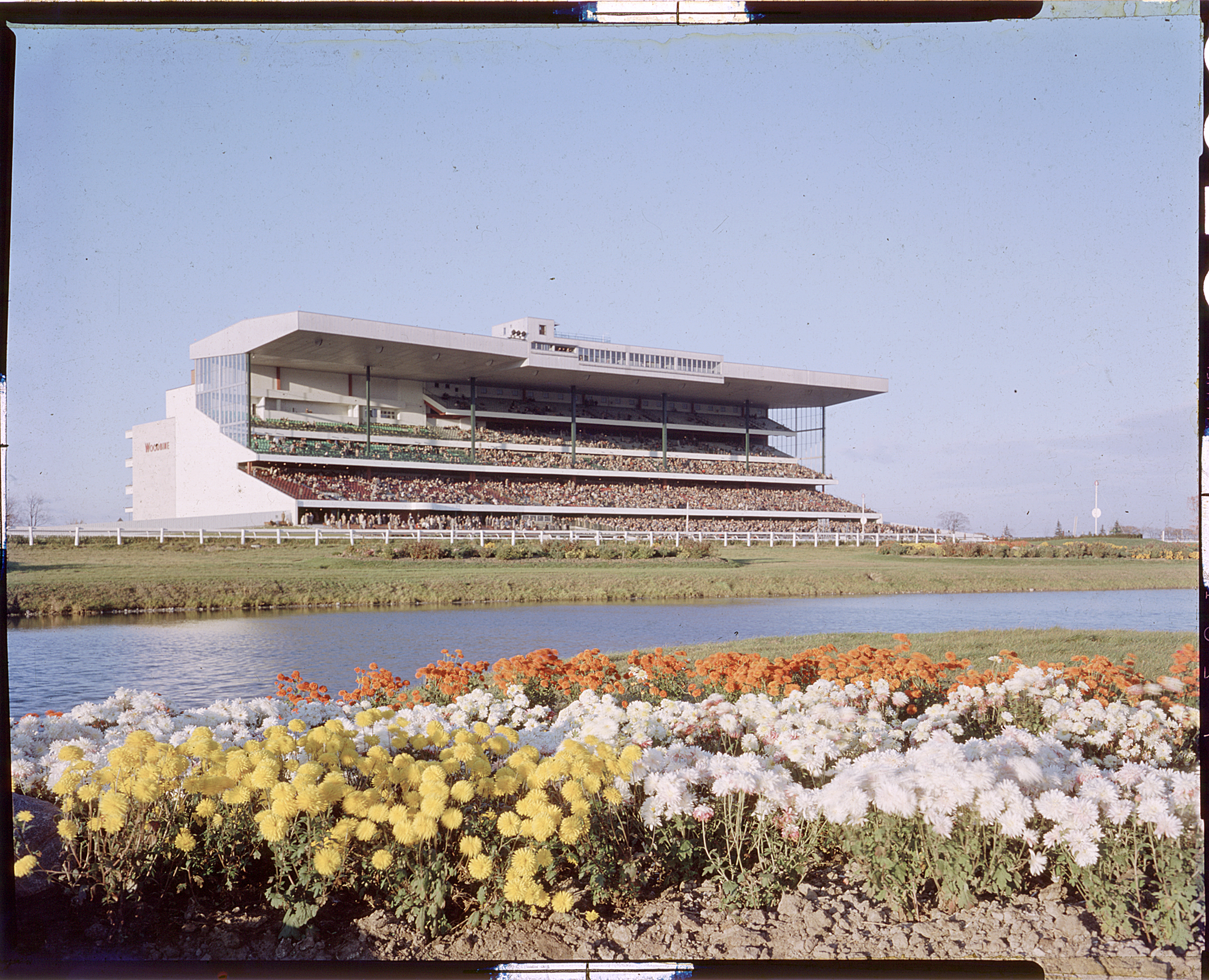
Grandstand for the new Woodbine Racetrack in 1959

The new racetrack opened on June 12, 1956, built at a cost of CA$13 million ($149 million in 2025 dollars). It was initially known as the New Woodbine Racetrack. It dropped the New in 1963. The old track was converted to a combined thoroughbred and standardbred track known thereafter as Old Woodbine or, for most of the rest of its history, as Greenwood Raceway (during standardbred meets) and Greenwood Race Track (during thoroughbred meets). The two thoroughbred and two standardbred meets conducted at Greenwood were transferred to the new Woodbine in 1994, which was until then exclusively devoted to thoroughbred racing. On June 30, 1959, Queen Elizabeth II and the Duke of Edinburgh attended the 100th running of the Queen's Plate, and Queen Elizabeth II again on July 4, 2010, attended the 151st running of the Queen's Plate Stakes and presented trophies.

The track was the opening venue for the 1976 Summer Paralympics, and some of the sporting events were held here. The Arlington Million was held at Woodbine in 1988. The Breeders' Cup was held at Woodbine in 1996. The Woodbine facility is also home to the Canadian Horse Racing Hall of Fame. In 2018, the track began using a GPS-based timing system.

In 2022, Woodbine announced plans to add an 8,000-seat soccer-specific stadium and adjoining training facilities in the northeast corner of the property; this would be the presumed new home of York United FC and possibly house a future professional women's soccer club.

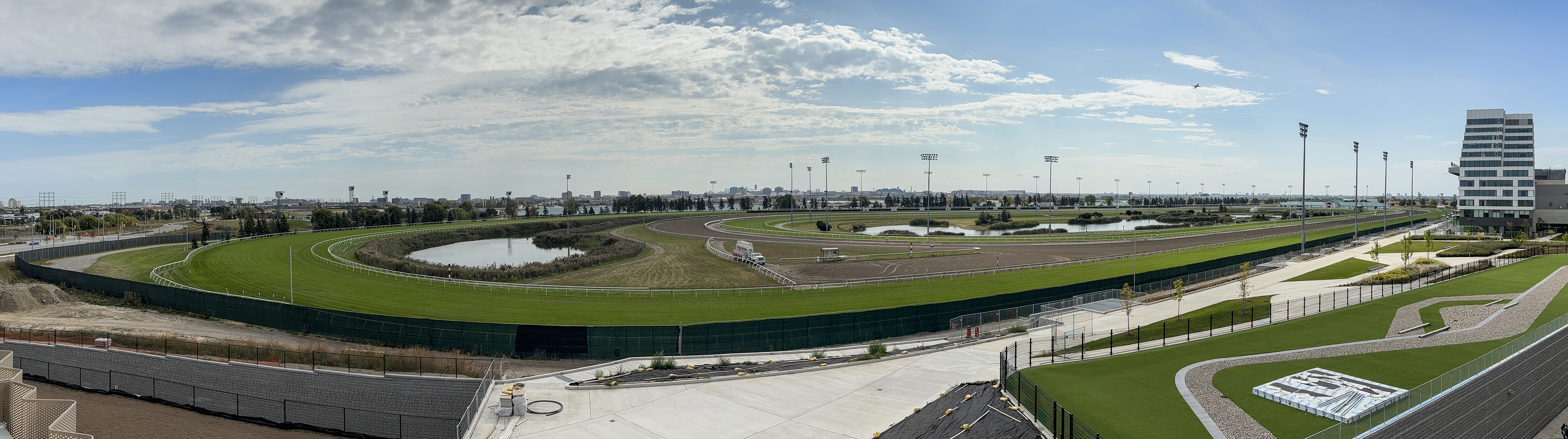
Woodbine Racetrack in 2023

== Physical attributes ==
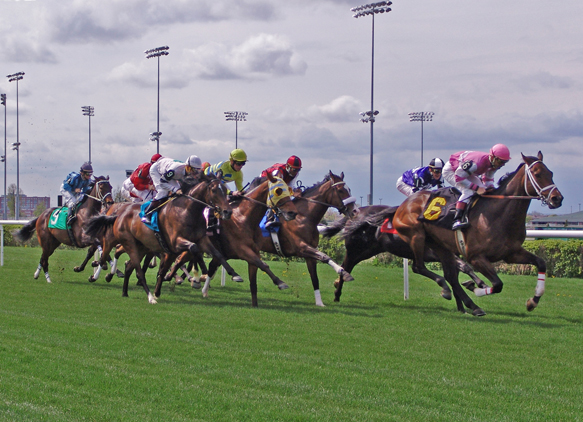
The E. P. Taylor Turf Course

Completed in 1994 and renovated in 2025, Woodbine's outermost main track, the E. P. Taylor turf course, is an asymmetrically shaped three-turn racecourse. It is 1.5 miles (2.4 km) long with a chute allowing races of 1.125 miles (1.811 km) to be run around one turn. The first clubhouse turn is a 30 degree left, followed by a short straight run, then a 150 degree left on a radius as tight as Woodbine’s seven-eighths-mile inner turf course. The backstretch is 2.5 feet (76 cm) to 3 feet (91 cm) higher than the homestretch. The far turn, at 2½ furlongs in length, begins gradually on a wide radius, then it tightens as it approaches the homestretch, 1,440 feet long, the length of five U.S. football fields. Longer than a quarter mile, the homestretch is 30 percent longer than the 1,097-foot-long stretch at Belmont Park in New York, the only other 1.5 mile layout in North American thoroughbred racing.

Inside the Taylor course is the 1 mile (1.6 km) synthetic course for Thoroughbreds. Since April 9, 2016, the surface has been Tapeta; it was Polytrack from August 31, 2006 through 2015, and a natural dirt surface prior to that. Two chutes facilitate races at seven furlongs [.875 miles (1.408 km)] and at 1.25 miles (2.01 km).

The innermost oval was originally a 7/8-mile [.875 miles (1.408 km)] grass oval until the E. P. Taylor turf course opened in 1994. It was then converted to a crushed limestone dirt course and was used for harness racing until April 2018. It was then converted back to a second turf course for the 2019 thoroughbred racing season. The first race on the new Inner Turf was run on June 28, 2019 and was won by Bold Rally with Eurico Rosa da Silva aboard.

Portions of the current E. P. Taylor turf course (the backstretch and far turn) originally formed part of a long turf chute that crossed over the dirt course to the inner turf oval at the top of the stretch. This was used for several major races, including Secretariat's final race in the 1973 Canadian International, until the entire E. P. Taylor course was completed in 1994.

=== Incidents ===
In November 2024, Woodbine cancelled its November 10 final 2 racecard after three catastrophic injuries on the Tapeta track surface as a precautionary approach. It consulted the National HBPA, the Jockeys' Guild and the AGCO. The incidents include a breakdown of an unnamed horse during a workout, the 3-year-old filly Social Dancer (Society's Chairman)'s awkward step at the half-mile marker and in the GIII Bessarabian Stakes, the 6-year-old mare Owen's Tour Guide (Tourist)'s wrong step, resulting in their euthanasia.

== Casino ==
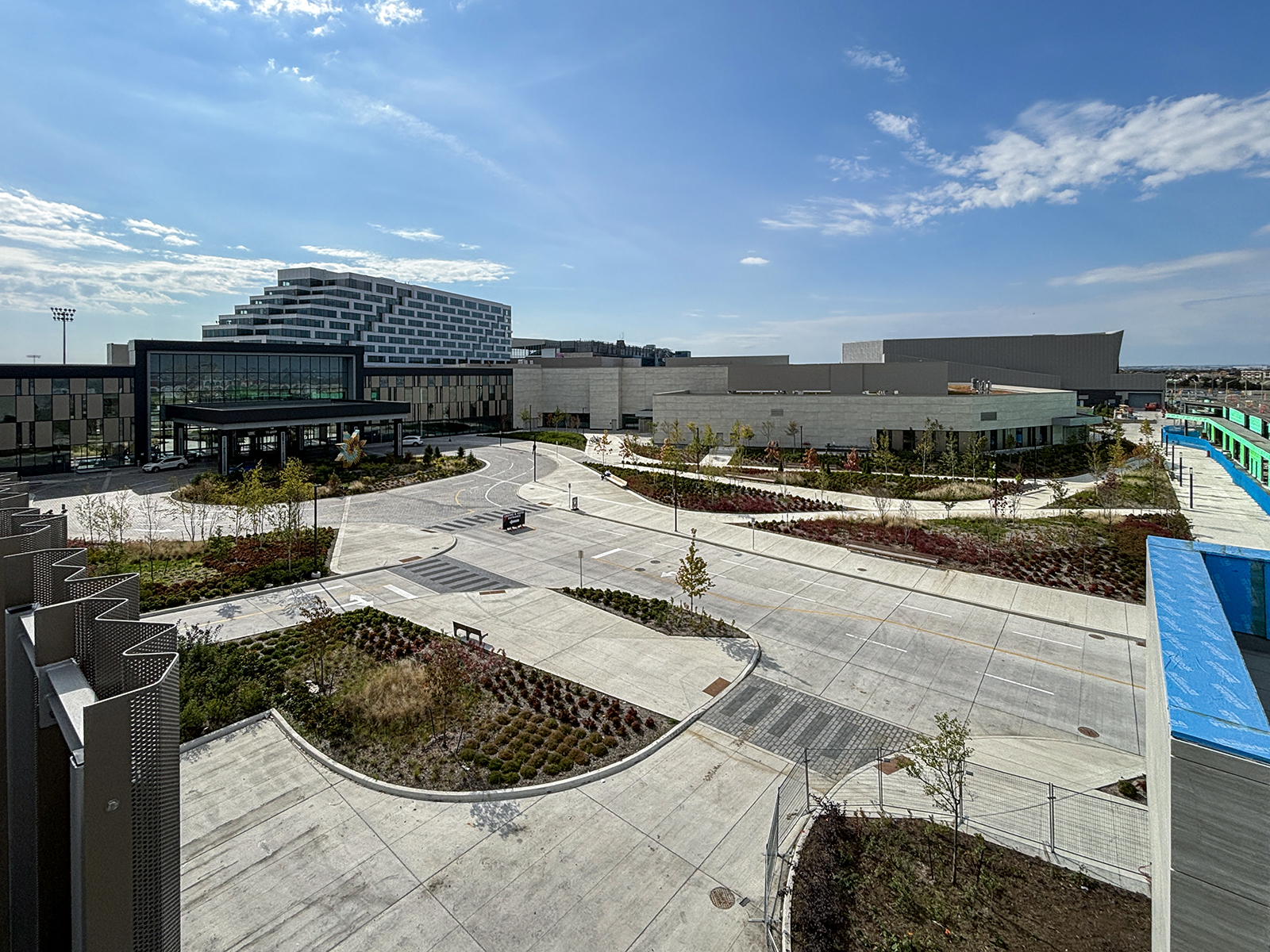
Great Canadian Casino Resort Toronto opened in 2023

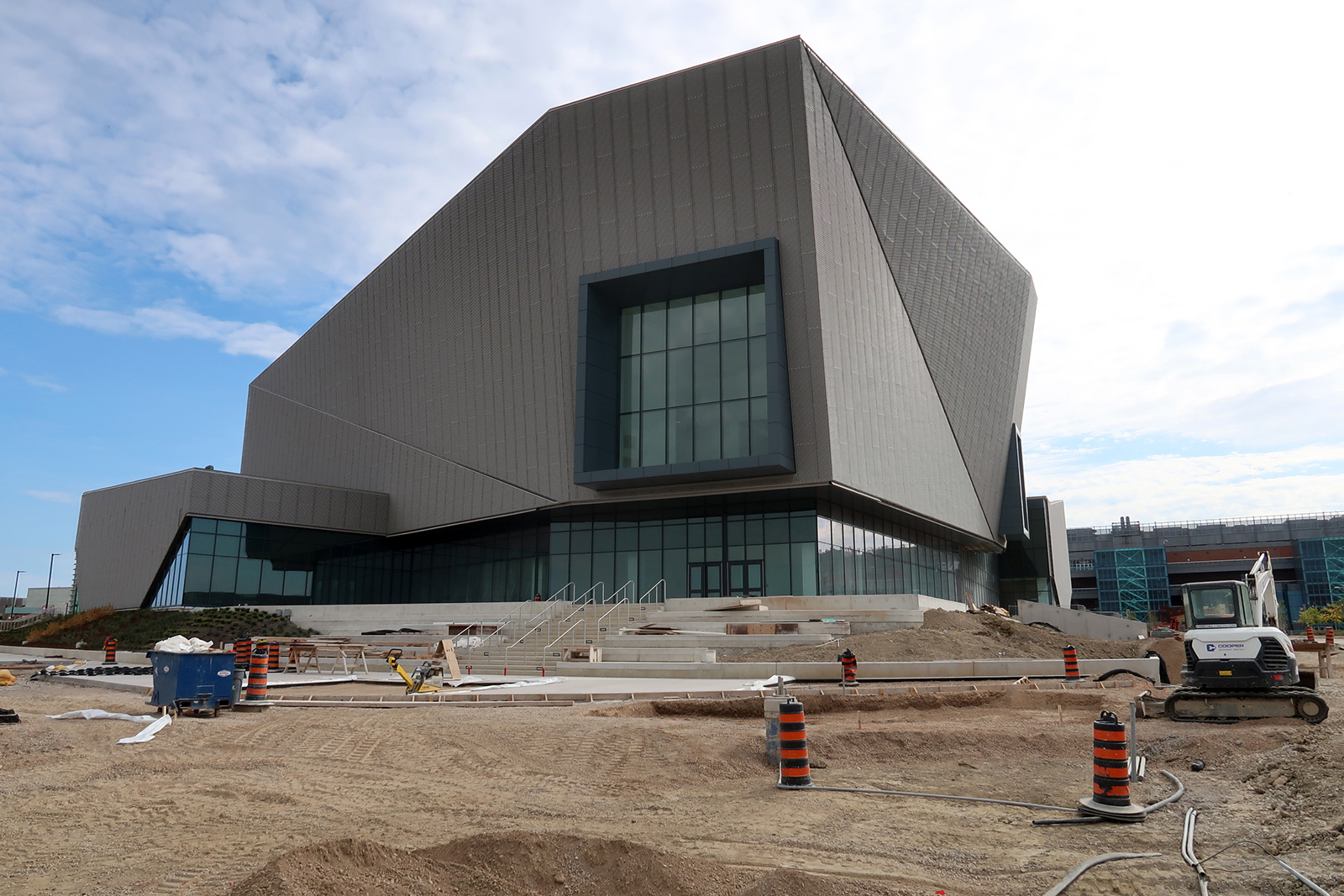
Entertainment venue under construction in Fall 2023

Casino Woodbine opened in 1999, offering a slots parlor and later expanded to table games in 2018. It contains 100+ table games, 3,500+ slot machines, 220+ electronic table games, and 100+ dealer assist stadium gaming. Table games include blackjack, roulette and baccarat. It is open 24 hours a day.

In 2019, construction began to expand the casino to include an entertainment venue, retail shops and a hotel.

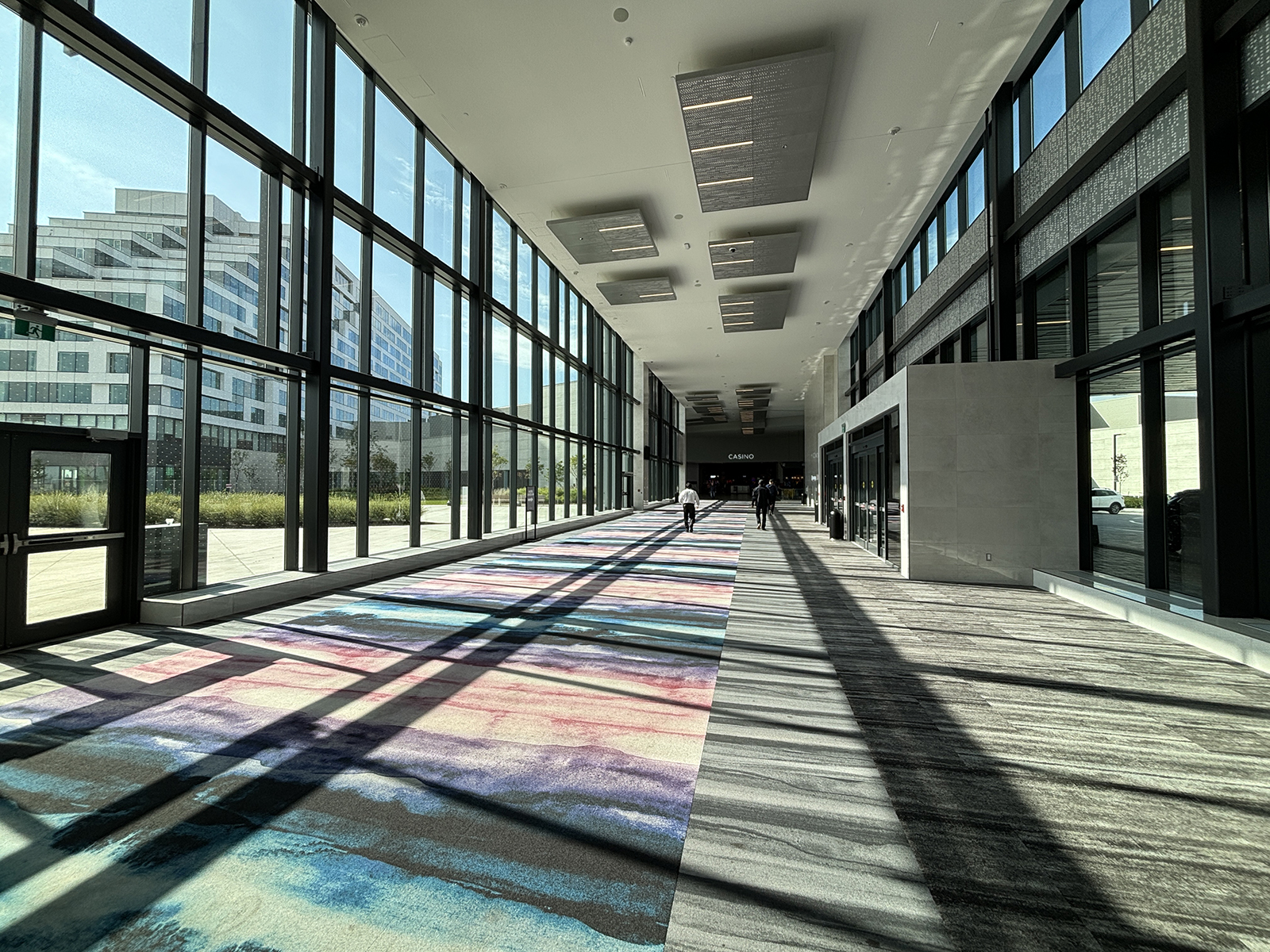
Resort East Lobby

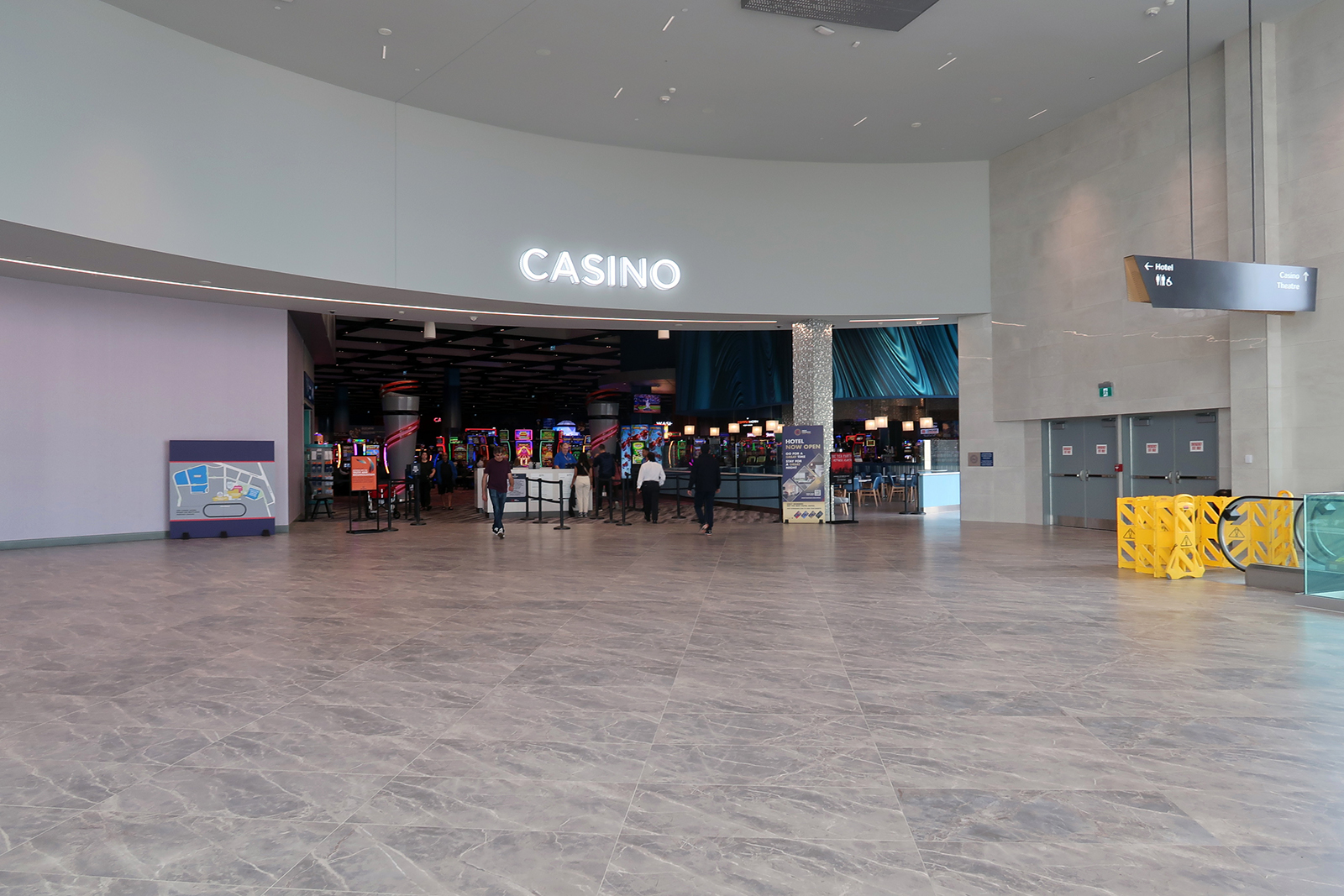
Casino

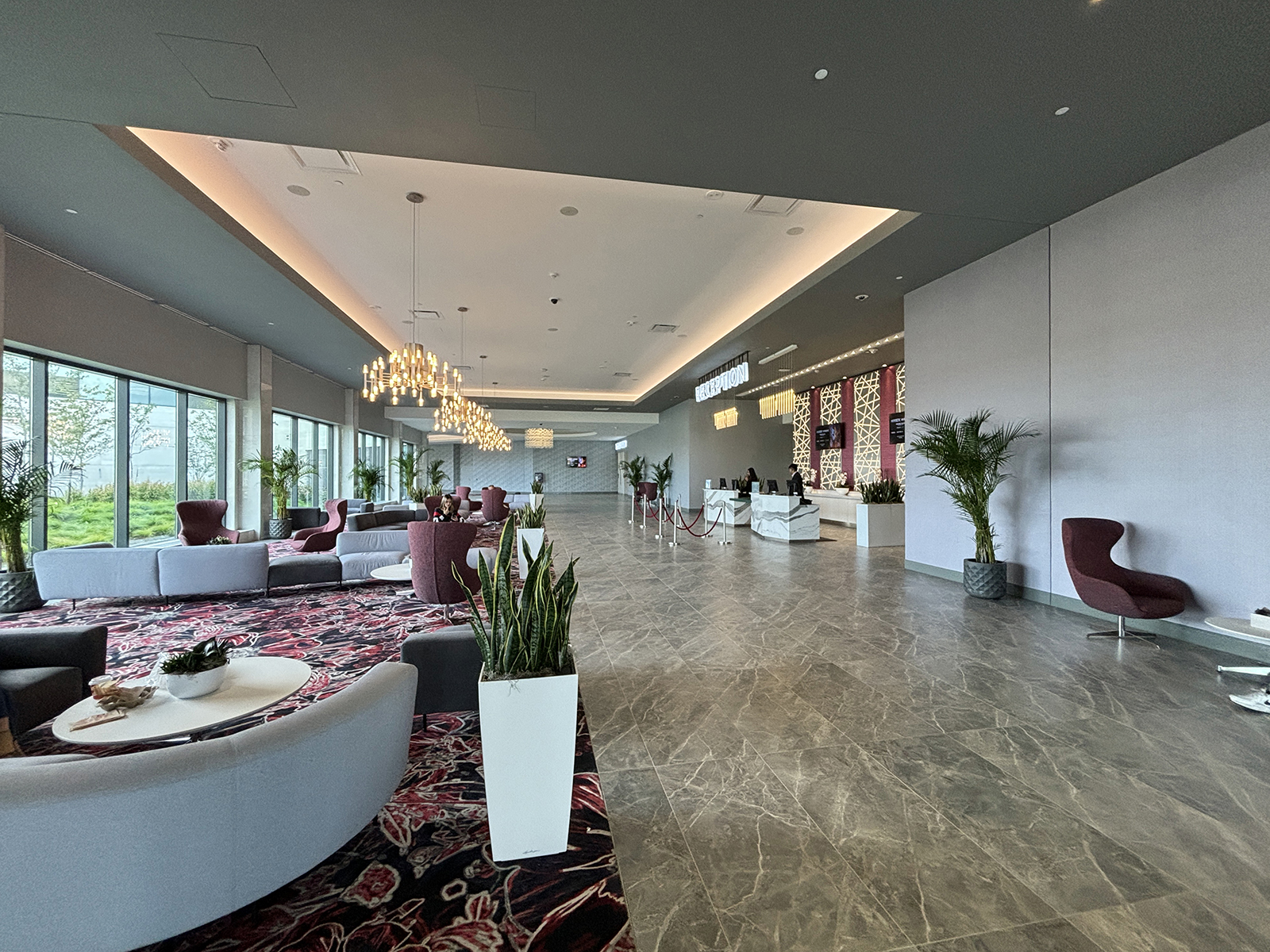
Hotel Lobby

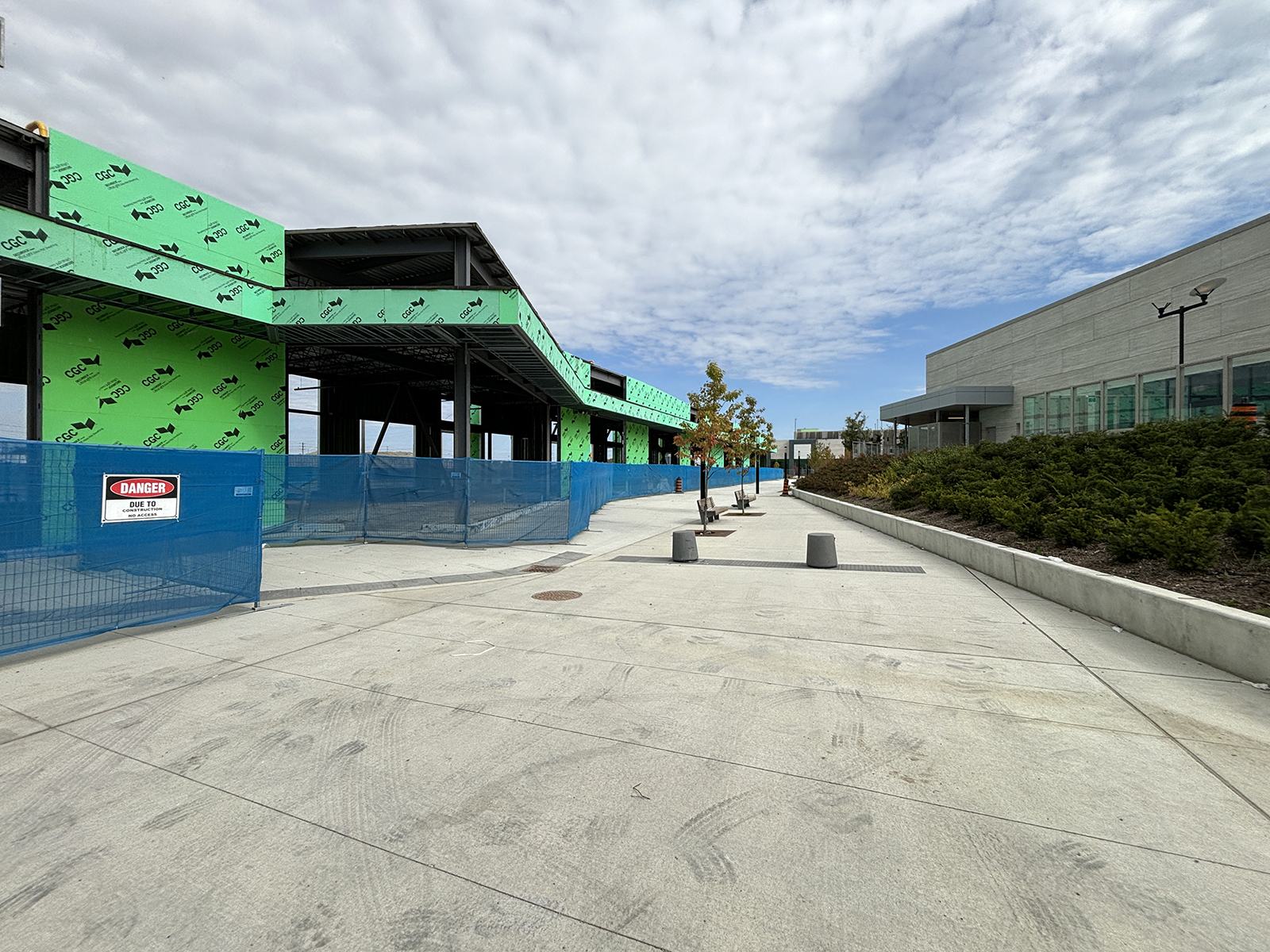
Retail complex under construction in Fall 2023

== Horse racing ==
=== Standardbred races ===
Woodbine has been a regular host for the Breeders Crown. Since the event changed to a one-night format in 2010, the facility has hosted three times—2011, 2012, and 2015.

Woodbine was also the host of the CA$1,500,000 North America Cup for three-year old pacing colts and geldings from 1994 to 2006. That race along with the Elegant Image Stakes for three-year old filly trotters and the Good Times Stakes for three-year old colt and gelding trotters, have been moved to Woodbine's sister track, Woodbine Mohawk Park.

Starting in 2018, all standardbred racing has been moved to Woodbine Mohawk, as the 7/8 standardbred track is being converted into a 2nd turf course.

Track Records (Pacing)
Pacing	Horse	Time	Driver/Trainer	Date
2 Year-Old Filly	I Luv The Nitelife Jk Shesalady	1:50.1	J. Moiseyev/C. Ryder Y. Gingras/N. Johansson	08/25/2012 08/30/2014
2 Year-Old Colt/Gelding	A Rocknroll Dance	1:49.1	R. Pierce/J. Mulinix	08/27/2011
3 Year-Old Filly	American Jewel	1:48.2	T. Tetrick/J. Takter	06/16/2012
3 Year-Old Colt/Gelding	Betting Line Thinking Out Loud Sweet Lou	1:47.4	D. Miller/C.Coleman R. Waples/B. McIntosh D. Palone/R. Burke	06/18/2016 06/16/2012 06/09/2012
Pacing Mare	Anndrovette	1:48.0	T. Tetrick/P.J. Fraley	07/20/2013
Pacing Horse/Gelding	Dr J Hanover	1:46.4	D. McNair/T. Alagna	06/03/2017

Track Records (Trotting)
Trotting	Horse	Time	Driver/Trainer	Date
2 Year-Old Filly	Mission Brief	1:52.1	Y.Gingras/R. Burke	09/04/2014
2 Year-Old Gelding	Father Patrick	1:53.4	Y. Gingras/J. Takter	09/14/2013
3 Year-Old Filly	Check Me Out Bee A Magician	1:52.1	T. Tetrick/R.Schnitker R. Zeron/R. Norman	06/16/2012 09/13/2013
3 Year-Old Colt/Gelding	Trixton Canepa Hanover	1:51.3	J.Takter/J. Takter Y. Gingras/J. Takter	06/14/2014 06/12/15
Trotting Mare	Hannelore Hanover	1:51.0	Y. Gingras/R. Burke	06/18/2016
Trotting Horse/Gelding	Mister Herbie	1:50.4	J. Jamieson/J. Gillis	07/21/2012

=== Thoroughbred races ===
The record for most wins by a jockey on a single raceday at Woodbine is seven, set by Richard Grubb on May 16, 1967, and twice equaled by the legendary Canadian jockey Sandy Hawley, first on May 22, 1972 and then again on October 10, 1974.

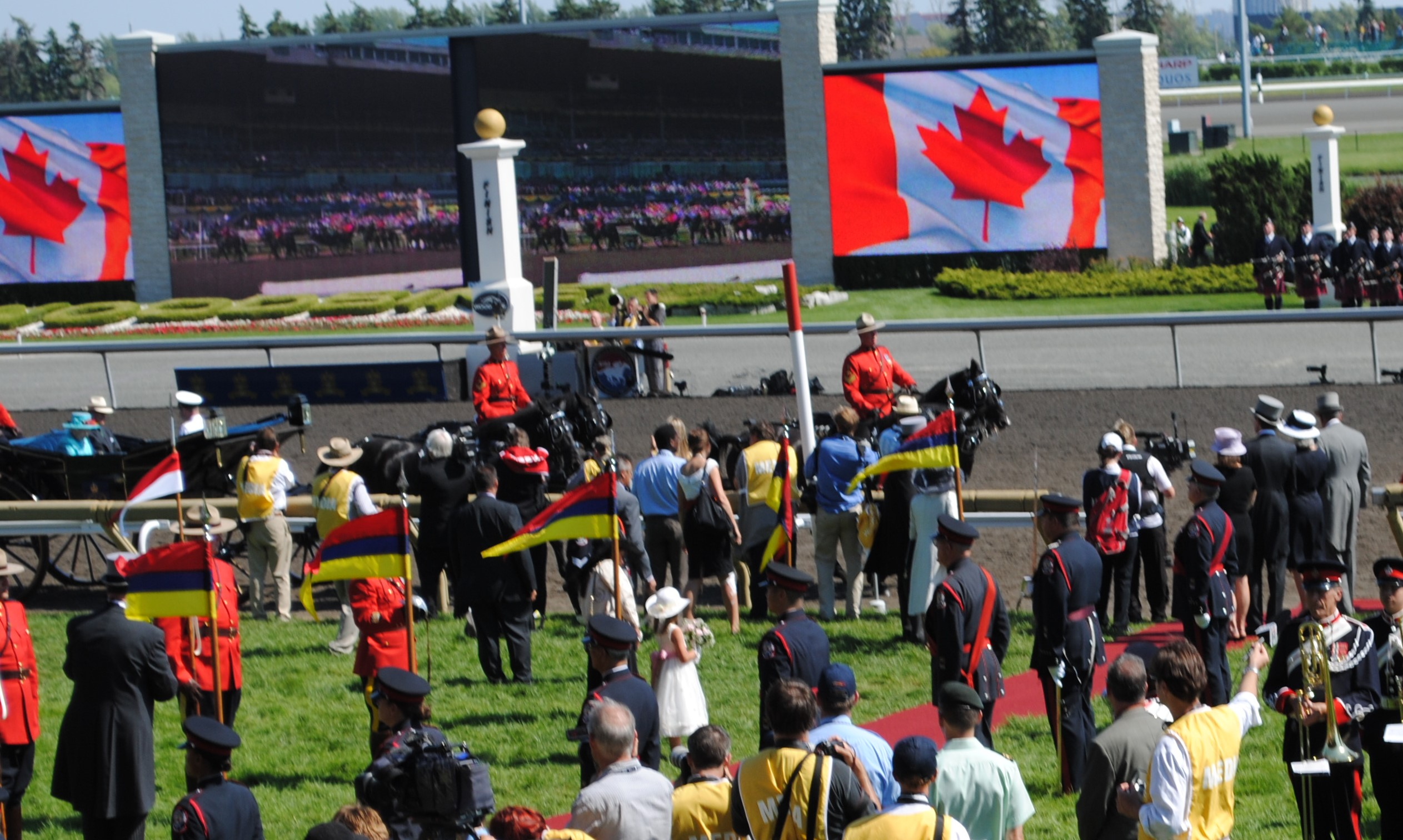
Elizabeth II attends the Queen's Plate in 2010. Founded in 1860, it is Canada's oldest thoroughbred horse race.

Major Stakes races for Thoroughbreds run annually at Woodbine include the:

- King's Plate, a stakes for three-year-old Canadian-bred thoroughbreds, first leg of the Canadian Triple Crown. Because the race is restricted to Canadian-bred horses, it is not eligible for grading, despite being one of Canada's most prestigious races
- Northern Dancer Turf Stakes, a turf mile-and-one-half Grade 1 stakes run in early fall as the final prep for the Canadian International or Breeders' Cup Turf
- Breeders' Stakes, a stakes for three-year-old Canadian-bred thoroughbreds, third leg of the Canadian Triple Crown
- Woodbine Mile, a Grade 1 thoroughbred turf stakes
- Canadian International, a Grade 1 thoroughbred turf stakes
- E. P. Taylor Stakes, a Grade 1 thoroughbred turf race for fillies and mares

==== Stakes races restricted to horses foaled in Canada ====
- Bison City Stakes
- Breeders' Stakes
- Coronation Futurity Stakes
- Cup and Saucer Stakes
- Plate Trial Stakes
- Princess Elizabeth Stakes
- King's Plate
- Wonder Where Stakes
- Woodbine Oaks

==== Stakes races restricted to horses foaled in Ontario ====
- Achievement Stakes
- Carotene Stakes
- Clarendon Stakes
- Fanfreluche Stakes
- Fury Stakes
- Jammed Lovely Stakes
- Ontario Damsel Stakes
- Ontario Lassie Stakes
- Queenston Stakes
- Shady Well Stakes
- Vandal Stakes

==== Ontario Sire Stakes ====
- Ballade Stakes
- Bold Ruckus Stakes
- Bull Page Stakes
- Bunty Lawless Stakes
- Classy 'N Smart Stakes
- Deputy Minister Stakes
- Frost King Stakes
- Kingarvie Stakes
- Lady Angela Stakes
- La Prevoyante Stakes
- Nandi Stakes
- New Providence Stakes
- Overskate Stakes
- Shepperton Stakes
- Sir Barton Stakes
- South Ocean Stakes
- Steady Growth Stakes
- Vice Regent Stakes
- Victoriana Stakes

==== CTHS Yearling Sales Stakes ====
- Algoma Stakes
- Elgin Stakes
- Halton Stakes
- Kenora Stakes
- Muskoka Stakes
- Simcoe Stakes

==== Grade I ====
The following graded stakes were formerly run at Woodbine in 2019:

- Canadian International Stakes
- Highlander Stakes
- E. P. Taylor Stakes
- Natalma Stakes
- Northern Dancer Turf Stakes
- Summer Stakes
- Woodbine Mile

==== Grade II ====
- Autumn Stakes
- Bessarabian Stakes
- Canadian Stakes
- Connaught Cup Stakes
- Dance Smartly Stakes
- Eclipse Stakes
- Kennedy Road Stakes
- King Edward Stakes
- Nassau Stakes
- Nearctic Stakes
- Nijinsky Stakes
- Play The King Stakes
- Royal North Stakes
- Sky Classic Stakes

==== Grade III ====
- Bold Venture Stakes
- Dominion Day Stakes
- Durham Cup Stakes
- Grey Stakes
- Hendrie Stakes
- Jacques Cartier Stakes
- Maple Leaf Stakes
- Marine Stakes
- Mazarine Stakes
- Ontario Colleen Stakes
- Ontario Derby
- Ontario Fashion Stakes
- Ontario Matron Stakes
- Seagram Cup Stakes
- Seaway Stakes
- Selene Stakes
- Singspiel Stakes
- Trillium Stakes
- Valedictory Stakes
- Vigil Stakes
- Whimsical Stakes

==== Ungraded stakes ====
- Colin Stakes
- Display Stakes
- Duchess Stakes
- Glorious Song Stakes
- La Lorgnette Stakes
- My Dear Stakes
- Ontario Debutante Stakes
- Star Shoot Stakes
- Swynford Stakes
- Toronto Cup Stakes
- Victoria Park Stakes
- Victoria Stakes
- Woodstock Stakes

==== Overnight stakes ====
- Alywow Stakes
- Belle Mahone Stakes
- Charlie Barley Stakes

==== Discontinued races ====
- Canadian Maturity Stakes
- Hill 'n' Dale Stakes
- Silver Deputy Stakes
