= David K. Clark =

English-Canadian jockey

David K. Clark (born October 23, 1953) is an English-Canadian jockey. Born in Blaydon, County Durham, England, Clark made his career in Canadian thoroughbred horse racing. He began riding professionally at Ontario racetracks in 1973 and went on to become one of Canada's most successful jockeys of all time.

Clark won the 1998 Sovereign Award as Canadian Champion Jockey and on July 17 of that year he tied a record set by Sandy Hawley in 1974 when he won six consecutive races at Woodbine Racetrack. In 1999 Clark was voted the Avelino Gomez Memorial Award. Among his more than 2,900 career wins, Clark has twice won Canada's most prestigious race, the Queen's Plate. The first coming in 1981 aboard Fiddle Dancer Boy and his second in 1985 on La Lorgnette. David also won the 1984 Breeders' Stakes (on Bounding Away) to bring his win total in Canadian Classic Races to three.

Divorced with two daughters, David Clark's daughter Cory followed in his footsteps and in 2000 she won the Sovereign Award for Outstanding Apprentice Jockey. In 2003 at the Prince of Wales Stakes, David and Cory became the first father and daughter to compete against one another in a Canadian Triple Crown race.

== Conviction for drunk driving causing death ==
On May 16, 2006, Clark was detained by York Regional Police after a traffic collision near Kleinburg, Ontario that resulted in the death of 34-year-old school teacher Suzanne Mizuno and injuries to her brother Jamie and himself. He was charged with impaired driving causing death, impaired driving causing bodily harm, dangerous driving causing death, dangerous driving causing bodily harm, and a blood alcohol content exceeding the legal limit. He had a blood alcohol content between 0.12 and 0.17, above the legal limit of 0.08 in Ontario.

After a preliminary hearing in 2007, he was ordered to stand trial on all charges. His lawyer David Humphrey stated he would plead not guilty. In April 2008 he pleaded guilty to two of those charges, impaired driving causing death and impaired driving causing bodily harm. The other three charges were dropped.

Crown prosecutor Paul Tait had sought at least a three-year jail sentence. In November 2008, Clark was sentenced to two years less a day of house arrest followed by two years probation, was required to do 240 hours of community service, and was prohibited from driving for three years.
