= Canadian Triple Tiara of Thoroughbred Racing =

Horse racing series in Toronto

The Canadian Triple Tiara of Thoroughbred Racing is a series of Canadian Thoroughbred horse races for Canadian-foaled three-year-old fillies inaugurated in 1999. The series consists of the:

- Woodbine Oaks
- Bison City Stakes
- Wonder Where Stakes

All three races are hosted by Woodbine Racetrack (Bison City had begun at Fort Erie in 1954). Since 1965, only fillies have run in these races.

In 2007, Sealy Hill became the first filly to win the Canadian Triple Tiara.

== Canadian Triple Tiara winners ==
Key
Winner of all three races
Winner of two of the three races

Canadian Triple Tiara
Year	Woodbine Oaks	Bison City Stakes	Wonder Where Stakes
2026	Luster	Katie's Grace	Dixie Law
2025	No Time	Winterberry	Aristella
2024	Kin's Concerto	Stormcast	Hurricane Clair
2023	Elysian Field	Me and My Shadow	Tito's Calling
2022	Moira	Sister Seagull	Sister Seagull
2021	Munnyfor Ro	Il Malocchio	Munnyfor Ro
2020	Curlin's Voyage	Mizzen Bay	Merveilleux
2019	Desert Ride	Speedy Soul	Desert Ride
2018	Dixie Moon	Safe to Say	Avie's Mineshaft
2017	Holy Helena	Enstone	Inflexibility
2016	Neshama	Caren	Caren
2015	Academic	Brooklynsway	Season Ticket
2014	Lexie Lou	Unspurned	Lexie Lou
2013	Nipissing	Original Script	Smartyfly
2012	Irish Mission	Blue Heart	Awesome Fire
2011	Inglorious	Bear Its Time	Marketing Mix
2010	Roan Inish	Free Fee Lady	Free Fee Lady
2009	Milwaukee Appeal	Dance for Us	Tasty Temptation
2008	Ginger Brew	Nicki Knew	Northern Kraze
2007	Sealy Hill	Sealy Hill	Sealy Hill
2006	Kimchi	Kimchi	Like a Gem
2005	Gold Strike	Ready and Alluring	Silver Highlight
2004	Eye of the Sphynx	Touchnow	My Vintage Port
2003	Too Late Now	Brattothecore and Seeking the Ring (DH)	Alpha Saphire
2002	Ginger Gold	Silver Nithi	Hot Talent
2001	Dancethruthedawn	Quick Blue	Sweetest Thing
2000	Catch the Ring	Catch the Ring	Misty Mission
1999	Touch Dial	Synchronized	Free Vacation
1998	Kirby's Song	Regal Angela	Kirby's Song
1997	Capdiva	Nithi	One Emotion
1996	Silent Fleet	Silent Fleet	Colorful Vices
1995	Gal in a Ruckus	Woolloomooloo	Sylky Market
1994	Plenty of Sugar	Mysteriously	Mysteriously
1993	Deputy Jane West	Hey Hazel	Strong and Steady
1992	Hope for a Breeze	Hope for a Breeze	Bally Vaughn
1991	Dance Smartly	Wilderness Song	Quiet Cleo
1990	Tiffany's Secret	Lubicon	Spinnakers Flying
1989	Blondeinamotel	Coral Bracelet	Princess Caveat
1988	Tilt My Halo	Volterra	Sparrow Lake
1987	One from Heaven	Ruling Angel	Misty Magic
1986	Playlist	Playlist	Carotene
1985	La Lorgnette	In My Cap	In My Cap
1984	Classy 'n Smart	Classy 'n Smart	Bounding Away
1983	First Summer Day	Northern Blossom	Northern Blossom
1982	Avowal	Avowal	Pensioner
1981	Regent Miss	Rainbow Connection	Rainbow Connection
1980	Par Excellance	Cherry Berry	Leading Witness
1979	Kamar	Come Lucky Chance	Glorious Song
1978	La Voyageuse	La Voyageuse	No Politics
1977	Northernette	Fairly Regal	Wasaga
1976	Bye Bye Paris	Bye Bye Paris	Sharp Sherry
1975	Reasonable Win	Deepstar	Momigi
1974	Trudie Tudor	Snow Game	Lost Majorette
1973	Square Angel	Victorianette	Musketeer Miss^{†}
1972	Happy Victory	Takaring	Takaring
1971	Lauries Dancer	Lauries Dancer	Painted Pony
1970	South Ocean	Fanfreluche	Mary of Scotland
1969	Cool Mood	Sno Where	Not Too Shy
1968	Solometeor	Hometown News	Golden Garter
1967	All We Have	Lady Taj	Speedy Sonnet
1966	Northern Minx	Shipmate	Ice Water
1965	Northern Queen	Tie Pilot	Northern Queen
1964	Later Mel	Ramblin Road (non-filly)
1963	Menedict	Cesca
1962	Flaming Page	Vase
1961	Maid o'North	Glencoe Kid (non-filly)
1960	Menantic	Hidden Treasure (non-filly)
1959	Wonder Where	Winning Shot (non-filly)
1958	Yummy Mummy	Silver Ship (non-filly)
1957	La Belle Rose	Pink Velvet
1956	Air Page	Compactor (non-filly)
1955		Black Coyote (non-filly)
1954		Silly Sara
^{†}1973: Square Angel relegated from first to second in the Wonder Where Stakes.
