= Star Shoot Stakes =

Annual horse race

- Class: Ungraded stakes
- Location: Woodbine Racetrack; Toronto, Ontario, Canada
- Inaugurated: 1956
- Race type: Thoroughbred – Flat racing
- Website: woodbineentertainment.com

Race information
- Distance: Six furlong sprint
- Surface: Tapeta
- Track: Left-handed
- Qualification: Three-Year-Old Fillies
- Weight: Allowances
- Purse: $100,000 (Plus $50,000 for Ontario bred horses from T.I.P.)

The Star Shoot Stakes is a Thoroughbred horse race run annually at Woodbine Racetrack in Toronto, Ontario, Canada. Run in mid April, it is the first stakes race of the Woodbine racing season. An ungraded stakes race contested on dirt over six furlongs, it is open to three-year-old fillies.

Inaugurated in 1956 at Greenwood Raceway, and named for Star Shoot, the sire of Sir Barton, the race was hosted by the Fort Erie Racetrack from 1967 through 1975 before moving to its present location at Woodbine Racetrack in 1976. Since inception it has been contested at various distances:

- 6 furlongs : 1956, 1967 to present
- 6.5 furlongs : 1957
- 7 furlongs : 1958–1966

The Star Shoot Stakes was run in two divisions in 1961, 1979, 1986, and in 1999.

== Records ==
Speed record: (Through 1998, Woodbine times were recorded in fifths of a second. Since 1999 they are in hundredths of a second)

- 1:10.00 Happy Victory (1972)

Most wins by an owner:

- 5 – Windfields Farm (1958, 1960, 1961, 1966, 1969)

Most wins by a jockey:

- 5 – Sandy Hawley (1971, 1972, 1974, 1989, 1996)

Most wins by a trainer:

- 5 – Gordon J. McCann (1958, 1960, 1961, 1966, 1969)

== Winners since 1989 ==
Year	Winner	Jockey	Trainer	Owner	Time
2015	Ancient Goddess (FR)	Luis Contreras	John P. Terranova II	Sovereign Stable	1:10.19
2014	Zensational Bunny	Patrick Husbands	Mark Casse	Gary Barber	1:10.22
2013	Rootham Triple E's	Justin Stein	Sam Di Pasquale	M. Stroud, T. Rootham, G. Clarke	1:10.87
2012	Tu Endie Wei	James McAleney	Reade Baker	Brereton C. Jones	1:08.88
2011	Portside	Emma-Jayne Wilson	Barbara Minshall	Warren E. Byrne	1:10.09
2010	Biofuel	Eurico Rosa da Silva	Reade Baker	Brereton C. Jones	1:10.01
2009	Milwaukee Appeal	Na Somsanith	Scott H. Fairlie	C.E.C. Farms	1:10.90
2008	Verdana Bold	Emile Ramsammy	Daniel J. Vella	Edward Seltzer	1:10.59
2007	Native Legend	Richard Dos Ramos	Darwin Banach	William A. Sorokolit Sr.	1:10.97
2006	Summer Girlfriend	Gerry Olguin	John Charalambous	Equilease Racing Stable	1:11.93
2005	Lemon Maid	Todd Kabel	Malcolm Pierce	Live Oak Plantation Racing	1:10.60
2004	Ontheqt	James McAleney	Reade Baker	Baker & Janis Maine	1:11.72
2003	Winter Garden	Chantal Sutherland	Robert P. Tiller	Frank DiGiulio Jr.	1:09.04
2002	Platel	Emile Ramsammy	Vito Armata	Molinaro Stable	1:10.60
2001	Chamul	David Clark	Michael J. Doyle	Springfield Stable/Dura Racing	1:12.27
2000	Miss Inquisitive	Patrick Husbands	Thomas R. Bowden	Colebrook Farms	1:11.46
1999	Diablo's Closer	Robert Landry	Michael J. Doyle	Attal Racing Stable	1:13.22
1999	Fantasy Lake	Robert Landry	Roger Attfield	Windhaven	1:12.79
1998	Lady Beverly	Steve Bahen	Gary Chan	Daijyobu Racing Stable	1:10.20
1997	Relaxing Rhythm	Todd Kabel	Daniel Vella	Frank Stronach	1:10.40
1996	Highland Vixen	Sandy Hawley	Tony Mattine	Linmac Farms	1:10.60
1995	Daijin	Todd Kabel	Daniel Vella	John & Glen Sikura	1:10.60
1994	Countess Delainea	Mickey Walls	Brian Ross	Pedigree Farm	1:10.40
1993	Antique Auction	James McAleney	Roger Attfield	Pedigree Farm	1:12.20
1992	Main Topic	Richard Dos Ramos	Debbie England	Pantomime Stable	1:13.00
1991	Dance Smartly	Brian Swatuk	James E. Day	Sam-Son Farm	1:10.60
1990	Lubicon	Don Seymour	Roger Attfield	Kinghaven Farms	1:10.60
1989	Inverawe	Sandy Hawley	Patrick Collins	Knob Hill Stable	1:12.80
1988	Zadracarta	Jacinto Vásquez	Patrick Collins	Knob Hill Stable	1:11.80
1987	One From Heaven	Gary Stahlbaum	Phil England	Richard R. Kennedy	1:12.00
1986	Twilight Spook	Larry Attard	Michael J. Doyle	Windhaven	1:11.60
1986	Playlist	Robin Platts	Roger Attfield	Kinghaven Farms	1:12.00

== Earlier winners ==
- 1986 – Playlist
- 1985 – Burke's Express
- 1984 – Ada Prospect
- 1983 – Forest Green
- 1982 – Top Canary
- 1981 – Muskoka Weekend
- 1980 – Girls'l Be Girls
- 1979 – Reasonable Sin
- 1979 – High Voltage Sport
- 1978 – La Sorciere
- 1977 – Jansum Regal
- 1976 – Regal Gal
- 1975 – Deepstar
- 1974 – Trudie Tudor
- 1973 – Impressive Lady
- 1972 – Happy Victory
- 1971 – Lauries Dancer
- 1970 – Lady Cornwall
- 1969 – Drama School
- 1968 – Vics Turn
- 1967 – Northern Blonde
- 1966 – Gay North
- 1965 – Win Again
- 1964 – Later Mel
- 1963 – Charlene B.
- 1962 – Vase
- 1961 – Victoria Regina
- 1961 – Chops On
- 1960 – Menantic
- 1959 – Wonder Where
- 1958 – Windy Answer
- 1957 – Pink Velvet
- 1956 – Orchestra
