= Triple Tiara =

Triple Tiara can refer to:

- American Triple Tiara of Thoroughbred Racing, for three-year-old fillies in New York state
- Canadian Triple Tiara of Thoroughbred Racing, for three-year-old fillies in Canada
- Papal Tiara or triple tiara, used 1143–1963

== See also ==
- Triple Crown of Thoroughbred Racing, three-race series from many countries
