= Lauries Dancer =

Canadian-bred Thoroughbred racehorse

- Sire: Northern Dancer
- Grandsire: Nearctic
- Dam: Its Ann
- Damsire: Royal Gem II
- Sex: Filly
- Foaled: 1968
- Country: Canada
- Colour: Bay
- Breeder: Arthur Stollery
- Owner: Helen G. Stollery
- Trainer: James C. Bentley
- Record: 35: 13-7-5
- Earnings: $184,532

Major wins
- Canadian Oaks (1971); Delaware Oaks (1971); Alabama Stakes (1971); Bison City Stakes (1971); Star Shoot Stakes (1971); Maple Leaf Stakes (1972)

Awards
- Canadian Champion 3-Year-Old Filly (1971); Canadian Horse of the Year (1971)

Honours
- Canadian Horse Racing Hall of Fame (2006); Lauries Dancer Stakes at Fort Erie Racetrack
- Last updated on 2020-02-16

Lauries Dancer (April 4, 1968 - March, 1991) was a Canadian National Champion and Hall of Fame Thoroughbred racemare who won top races in Canada and the United States.

== Background ==
She was bred at Angus Glen Farm in Markham, Ontario by owner Arthur Stollery and raced by his wife Helen. By the stakes-winning mare Its Ann, she was sired by Kentucky Derby winner and United States and Canadian Hall of Fame inductee Northern Dancer, one of the most influential sires in Thoroughbred history. She was conditioned for racing by Jim Bentley from a base at Woodbine Racetrack in Toronto, Ontario.

== Racing career ==
At age two, Lauries Dancer won two her eight starts with her best stakes race results a third in both the Mazarine and Natalma Stakes. As a three-year-old in 1971, she developed into the best horse in Canada, female or male. She won the 1971 Bison City Stakes in stakes record time at Fort Erie Racetrack and the Star Shoot and Canadian Oaks at Woodbine. United States and Canadian Hall of Fame jockey Sandy Hawley rode her to victory in the Canadian Oaks, marking his second of five straight wins in Canada's most important race for three-year-old fillies. Sent to race in the United States at Delaware Park, she came from dead last in a field of eight to win the Delaware Oaks. At Saratoga Race Course, under future U.S. and Canadian Hall of Fame jockey Ron Turcotte, she captured the Alabama Stakes by three lengths in stakes record time. In both races, Lauries Dancer defeated the 1970 American Champion Two-Year-Old Filly, Forward Gal.

Lauries Dancer's 1971 performances earned her Canadian Horse of the Year honors.

As a four-year-old in 1972, Lauries Dancer did not enjoy the same success but won the historic Maple Leaf Stakes. She won her final race in 1972, then in January 1973 was racing in the Miss Tropical Handicap at Calder Race Course when she went lame midway down the backstretch.

== Stud record ==
Sold for $825,000, Lauries Dancer was retired to broodmare duty. She was bred to major stallions including Secretariat, Buckpasser, Vaguely Noble, Hoist The Flag, and Riverman. Of her nine foals, none met with her level of success in racing. Her value dropped considerably, and the February 23, 1990, issue of the Toronto Star newspaper reported that she had been sold in January 1990 in Oklahoma for $9,000. Standing at Margaux Farm in Midway, Kentucky, Lauries Dancer died at age twenty-three in March 1991 as a result of foaling complications.

In 2006, Lauries Dancer was inducted in the Canadian Horse Racing Hall of Fame.

== Pedigree ==
Pedigree of Lauries Dancer, bay mare, April 4, 1968
Sire Northern Dancer	Nearctic	Nearco	Pharos
Sire Northern Dancer	Nearctic	Nearco	Nogara
Sire Northern Dancer	Nearctic	Lady Angela	Hyperion
Sire Northern Dancer	Nearctic	Lady Angela	Sister Sarah
Sire Northern Dancer	Natalma	Native Dancer	Polynesian
Sire Northern Dancer	Natalma	Native Dancer	Geisha
Sire Northern Dancer	Natalma	Almahmoud	Mahmoud
Sire Northern Dancer	Natalma	Almahmoud	Arbitrator
Dam Its Ann	Royal Gem	Dhoti	Dastur
Dam Its Ann	Royal Gem	Dhoti	Tricky Aunt
Dam Its Ann	Royal Gem	French Gem	Beau Fils
Dam Its Ann	Royal Gem	French Gem	Fission
Dam Its Ann	Thidiot	Invermark	Teddy
Dam Its Ann	Thidiot	Invermark	Symphorosa
Dam Its Ann	Thidiot	Fairy Ring	High Time
Dam Its Ann	Thidiot	Fairy Ring	Ringlets (family: A1)
