= Vigors (horse) =

American-bred Thoroughbred racehorse

- Sire: Grey Dawn
- Grandsire: Herbager
- Dam: Relifordie
- Damsire: El Relicario
- Sex: Stallion
- Foaled: 1973
- Country: United States
- Colour: Gray
- Breeder: William R. Hawn
- Owner: William R. Hawn
- Trainer: Larry J. Sterling
- Record: 34: 9-6-4
- Earnings: US$633,305

Major wins
- Hollywood Invitational Handicap (1977); Rolling Green Handicap (1977); San Marcos Handicap (1978); San Antonio Stakes (1978); Bel Air Handicap (1978); Santa Anita Handicap (1978)

Vigors (1973–1994) was an American Thoroughbred racehorse known as "The White Tornado." Called by Bloodhorse.com in a 2011 article "the great California closer," Vigors earned the affection of racing fans because of his dramatic come-from-behind running style.

== Background ==
Vigors was bred in Kentucky by William R. Hawn, a Dallas, Texas businessman who was the president and a shareholder of Del Mar Racetrack in Del Mar, California, and a founding partner of the Dallas Cowboys of the National Football League. The horse was named for William Hawn's friend Tim Vigors, a World War II fighter ace and founder of Ireland's renowned Coolmore Stud.

== Racing career ==
Raced mainly on grass, in 1977 the late developing Vigors won the Hollywood Invitational Handicap and the Rolling Green Handicap. The following year, trainer Larry Sterling entered him in the San Marcos Handicap, a race of a mile and an eighth on dirt. Under jockey Darrel McHargue, Vigors won easily then with the same rider followed up with a win in the San Antonio Stakes in track record time on dirt. In the most important win of his career, Darrel McHargue brought Vigors from dead last to win the Santa Anita Handicap by two lengths, again on dirt. For jockey McHargue, the win topped off an extraordinary day in which he won six races. Vigors did not race again until early June when he won the Bel Air Handicap on dirt. Assigned top weight in the Hollywood Gold Cup, Vigors ran third in what was his final race before retiring to stud duty.

== Race record ==
Date	Track	Race (Grade)	Distance	Finish	Jockey	Winner (Runner-Up)
1975 (two-year-old season)
12/26/1975	Santa Anita	Maiden	D6F	8th	W. Harris	An Act
1976 (three-year-old season)
1/7/1976	Santa Anita	Maiden	D6F	6th	W. Harris	Life's Hope
1/18/1976	Santa Anita	Maiden	D8.5F	4th	W. Harris	Misty Stone
2/1/1976	Santa Anita	Maiden	D8.5F	8th	K. Skinner	June's Blazer
2/15/1976	Santa Anita	Maiden	D8.5F	10th	K. Skinner	Samburu
3/28/1976	Santa Anita	Maiden	D9F	7th	K. Skinner	Romeo
4/10/1976	Hollywood Park	Maiden	D8.5F	5th	K. Skinner	Energy
5/2/1976	Hollywood Park	Maiden	D9F	2nd	J. Lambert	Steelwood
5/15/1976	Hollywood Park	Maiden	T9F	1st	J. Lambert	(Kentito) (Peter Vandais)
5/23/1976	Hollywood Park	Allowance	T8.5F	4th	G. Howard	Romeo
6/6/1976	Hollywood Park	Allowance	T8.5F	3rd	F. Toro	Stepladder
6/27/1976	Hollywood Park	Allowance	T11F	2nd	S. Hawley	Sibirri
7/18/1976	Hollywood Park	Allowance	T9F	2nd	S. Hawley	White Fir
7/25/1976	Hollywood Park	Allowance	T11F	4th	S. Hawley	Rex Ranger
8/15/1976	Del Mar	Allowance	T9F	1st	L. Pincay	(Kentito)
8/29/1976	Del Mar	Del Mar Derby (G3)	T9F	6th	R. Gonzalez	Terrespan
1977 (four-year-old season)
1/22/1977	Santa Anita	Allowance	T9F	1st	F. Olivares	(King's Cliffe)
2/12/1977	Santa Anita	Camino Real Handicap	T10F	3rd	F. Olivares	Keep the Promise
2/27/1977	Santa Anita	Handicap	T9F	2nd	L. Pincay	Mr. Bold Batter
3/23/1977	Santa Anita	San Marino Stakes	T12F	3rd	L. Pincay	Properantes
4/23/1977	Hollywood Park	Allowance	T9F	2nd	J. Lambert	Gallivantor
5/7/1977	Golden Gate	Rolling Green Handicap	T11F	1st	J. Lambert	(Victorian Prince)
5/30/1977	Hollywood Park	Hollywood Invitational Handicap (G1)	T12F	1st	J. Lambert	(Caucasus)
6/18/1977	Belmont Park	Bowling Green Handicap	T10F	10th	J. Lambert	Hunza Dancer
7/25/1977	Hollywood Park	Sunset Handicap (G1)	T12F	4th	J. Lambert	Today 'n Tomorrow
10/9/1977	Santa Anita	Carlton F. Burke Handicap (G2)	T10F	3rd	J. Lambert	Double Discount
10/23/1977	Santa Anita	Oak Tree Invitational Stakes (G1)	T12F	2nd	J. Lambert	Crystal Water
11/5/1977	Laurel Park	Washington DC International Stakes (G1)	T12F	7th	J. Lambert	Johnny D.
11/19/1977	Aqueduct	Turf Classic Stakes	T12F	4th	J. Vasquez	Johnny D.
1978 (five-year-old season)
1/22/1978	Santa Anita	San Marcos Handicap (G3)	D9F	1st	D. McHargue	(Pay Tribute)
2/19/1978	Santa Anita	San Antonio Stakes (G1)	D9F	1st	D. McHargue	(Ancient Title)
3/5/1978	Santa Anita	Santa Anita Handicap (G1)	D10F	1st	D. McHargue	(Mr. Redoy)
6/4/1978	Hollywood Park	Bel Air Handicap (G2)	D9F	1st	D. McHargue	(Mr. Redoy)
6/25/1978	Hollywood Park	Hollywood Gold Cup (G1)	D10F	3rd	D. McHargue	Exceller

== Stud career ==
Vigors stood at Jonabell Farm, near Lexington Kentucky. He was the successful sire of numerous winners including multiple stakes winners, Royal Mountain Inn, Exemplary Leader and Lovlier Linda, among others. He also sired millionaires Hodges Bay and Real Connection and had five other of his progeny earn more than half a million dollars in racing. Vigors is also the damsire of Ginger Gold, the 2001 Canadian Champion Two-Year-Old Filly.

Vigors died at age twenty-three on September 27, 1994, due to health problems.

== Pedigree ==
Pedigree of Vigors
Sire Grey Dawn	Herbager	Vandale	Plassy
Sire Grey Dawn	Herbager	Vandale	Vanille
Sire Grey Dawn	Herbager	Flagette	Escamillo
Sire Grey Dawn	Herbager	Flagette	Fidgette
Sire Grey Dawn	Polamia	Mahmoud	Blenheim
Sire Grey Dawn	Polamia	Mahmoud	Mah Mahal
Sire Grey Dawn	Polamia	Ampola	Pavot
Sire Grey Dawn	Polamia	Ampola	Blue Denim
Dam Relifordie	El Relicario	Relic	War Relic
Dam Relifordie	El Relicario	Relic	Bridal Colors
Dam Relifordie	El Relicario	Saponite	Épinard
Dam Relifordie	El Relicario	Saponite	Soap Water
Dam Relifordie	Crafordie	Cranach	Coronach
Dam Relifordie	Crafordie	Cranach	Reine Isaure
Dam Relifordie	Crafordie	Maforte	Massine
Dam Relifordie	Crafordie	Maforte	Fox Tor
