= Square Angel =

Canadian-bred Thoroughbred racehorse

- Sire: Quadrangle
- Grandsire: Cohoes
- Dam: Nangela
- Damsire: Nearctic
- Sex: Mare
- Foaled: 1970
- Country: Canada
- Colour: Bay
- Breeder: E. P. Taylor
- Owner: General W. Preston Gilbride
- Trainer: Frank H. Merrill, Jr.
- Record: 25: 7-9-3
- Earnings: $106,446

Major wins
- Shady Well Stakes (1972); Fury Stakes (1973); Canadian Oaks (1973); Nettie Handicap (1973)

Awards
- Canadian Champion Three-Year-Old Filly (1973)
- Last updated on March 4, 2010

Square Angel (foaled April 4, 1970 in Ontario) was a Canadian Champion Thoroughbred racehorse.

== Background ==
Bred by E. P. Taylor, Square Angel was sired by the 1964 Belmont Stakes winner, Quadrangle. Her dam, Nangela, was a daughter of Nearctic, the sire of one of the most influential sires in Thoroughbred history, Northern Dancer.

== Racing career ==
Square Angel was purchased and raced by General W. Preston Gilbride CBE, DSO, CO-N, who entrusted her training to future Canadian Horse Racing Hall of Fame trainer, Frank Merrill, Jr. A stakes winner at two, Square Angel, as a three-year-old in 1973, won Canada's most prestigious race for fillies of her age group: the Canadian Oaks. In addition to victories in the Fury Stakes and Nettie Handicap, she initially finished first in the Wonder Where Stakes but was disqualified and placed second. Square Angel's performances earned her the titleof Canadian Champion Three-Year-Old Filly.

== Broodmare ==
Retired to broodmare duty, Square Angel was the dam of four stakes winners and one additional stakes-placed winner from six foals to race. Among her best offspring were Kamar (b. 1976), a Canadian Champion Three-Year-Old Filly and the 1990 Kentucky Broodmare of the Year, and Love Smitten (b. 1981), whose wins included the Grade 1 Apple Blossom Handicap and the Grade 2 Santa Maria Handicap and who was the dam of Swain. Kamar's daughter, Jood produced Fantastic Light.
