= Northernette =

Canadian-bred Thoroughbred racehorse

- Sire: Northern Dancer
- Grandsire: Nearctic
- Dam: South Ocean
- Damsire: New Providence
- Sex: Mare
- Foaled: March 4, 1974
- Country: Canada
- Colour: Bay
- Breeder: E. P. Taylor
- Owner: Syl Asadoorian & Sam Cosentino; Peter M. Brant
- Trainer: Jerry C. Meyer; Frank Y. Whiteley, Jr.
- Record: 33: 13-11-3
- Earnings: US$404,914

Major wins
- Mazarine Stakes (1976); Fury Stakes (1977); Selene Stakes (1977); Canadian Oaks (1977); Chrysanthemum Handicap (1977); Apple Blossom Handicap (1978); Top Flight Handicap (1978)

Awards
- Canadian Champion 2-Year-Old Filly (1976); Canadian Champion 3-Year-Old Filly (1977)

Honours
- Canadian Horse Racing Hall of Fame (1987)

Northernette (foaled March 4, 1974 – after 1998) was a Canadian Thoroughbred Hall of Fame racehorse. A Canadian champion at both ages two and three, she was also a Grade I stakes winner in the United States.

== Background ==
Northernette was a bay mare who was bred in Ontario by E.P. Taylor, called the "chief architect of the modern evolution of Canadian racing and breeding" by the Canadian Horse Racing Hall of Fame. Taylor was the founder of the Canadian Jockey Club and helped run several other prominent racing institutions. He is best known as the owner and breeder of the great Northern Dancer, who was the first Canadian-bred horse to win the Kentucky Derby and later became one of the most dominant sires in Thoroughbred history.

Taylor also bred the mare South Ocean, who won the Canadian Oaks in 1970 and later produced eight winners from twelve foals. When bred to Northern Dancer, South Ocean first produced Northernette, followed a few years later by champion and important sire Storm Bird. Several of South Ocean's daughters also became successful producers, and her name can be found in pedigrees around the world. In retrospect, the Canadian Horse Racing Hall of Fame says that Northernette "was among the best Canadian-bred race fillies ever raised in this country."

Northernette was purchased at auction by the partnership of Syl Asadoorian and Sam Cosentino who raced her from a base at Woodbine Racetrack in Toronto, Ontario. They entrusted her conditioning to Jerry Meyer.

== Racing career ==
In her two-year-old racing season, Northernette raced ten times, finishing first five times, second three times and third once. Second in her first start on May 9, 1976 at Woodbine, she won her following start on May 22. Over the summer, she recorded two wins in allowance company before finishing second in her first stakes race appearance in the Princess Elizabeth. She then won another allowance race before recording her most important victory of the year in the Mazarine Stakes. She finished the year with a fourth-place finish in the Demoiselle Stakes at Aqueduct Racetrack in the United States. She was voted the 1976 Sovereign Award for Champion 2-Year-Old Filly.

At age three in 1977, Northernette earned five wins and five second-placed finishes from twelve starts. Her most important win was in the prestigious Canadian Oaks, which she won by a then-record eleven lengths. In so doing, she became the first Canadian Oaks winner to be the daughter of an Oaks winner. Northernette then went up against her male counterparts in Canada's most important race, the Queen's Plate, and finished second to Sound Reason by a half length. She also set a stakes record while winning the Selene Stakes. She was then shipped to Saratoga where she finished second in the Test Stakes, then fifth in the Alabama.

After the Alabama in August 1977, Northernette's owners sold a controlling interest in her to American Peter M. Brant. Her conditioning was then taken over by future U.S. Racing Hall of Fame trainer, Frank Whiteley, whose son David, as well as Shug McGaughey, were both working as his assistants. In her first start for her new connections, Northernette won an allowance race at Woodbine before shipping south to Laurel Park in Maryland, where she won the Grade III Chrysanthemum Handicap. She finished the year with a runner-up finish in the Grade II Firenze Handicap, losing by a nose. Northernette's 1977 performances earned her Canadian Champion 3-Year-Old Filly honors.

In 1978, Northernette recorded three wins and two second-place finishes from eleven starts. The highlights were her two Grade I wins, in both cases while under the care of one of Frank Whitely's assistant trainers. Under McGaughey, Northernette won the Apple Blossom Handicap at Oaklawn Park in Hot Springs, Arkansas then was sent north to Aqueduct Racetrack where David Whiteley saddled her to a win in the Top Flight Handicap. Later in the season, Northernette finished second to American Champion Three-Year-Old Filly Tempest Queen in the Spinster Stakes at Keeneland Race Course in Lexington, Kentucky.

== Stud record ==
Retired to broodmare duty, Northernette became a successful producer, though not at the level of her dam South Ocean. Northernette's best offspring were American Grade I winner Scoot and Irish Group II winner Gold Crest, both by Mr. Prospector. Several of her daughters also became successful producers in North America, Europe and Japan. South Ocean and Northernette were both named reines-de-course, a term for influential broodmares, by pedigree expert Ellen Parker.

Northernette was inducted in the Canadian Horse Racing Hall of Fame in 1987.

== Pedigree ==
Pedigree of Northernette (CAN), bay mare, 1974
Sire Northern Dancer (CAN) 1961	Nearctic (CAN); 1954	Nearco	Pharos
Sire Northern Dancer (CAN) 1961	Nearctic (CAN); 1954	Nearco	Nogara
Sire Northern Dancer (CAN) 1961	Nearctic (CAN); 1954	Lady Angela	Hyperion
Sire Northern Dancer (CAN) 1961	Nearctic (CAN); 1954	Lady Angela	Sister Sarah
Sire Northern Dancer (CAN) 1961	Natalma (USA); 1957	Native Dancer	Polynesian
Sire Northern Dancer (CAN) 1961	Natalma (USA); 1957	Native Dancer	Geisha
Sire Northern Dancer (CAN) 1961	Natalma (USA); 1957	Almahmoud	Mahmoud
Sire Northern Dancer (CAN) 1961	Natalma (USA); 1957	Almahmoud	Arbitrator
Dam South Ocean (CAN) 1967	New Providence (CAN); 1956	Bull Page	Bull Lea
Dam South Ocean (CAN) 1967	New Providence (CAN); 1956	Bull Page	Our Page
Dam South Ocean (CAN) 1967	New Providence (CAN); 1956	Fair Colleen	Preciptic
Dam South Ocean (CAN) 1967	New Providence (CAN); 1956	Fair Colleen	Fairvale
Dam South Ocean (CAN) 1967	Shining Sun (CAN); 1962	Chop Chop	Flares
Dam South Ocean (CAN) 1967	Shining Sun (CAN); 1962	Chop Chop	Sceptical
Dam South Ocean (CAN) 1967	Shining Sun (CAN); 1962	Solar Display	Sun Again
Dam South Ocean (CAN) 1967	Shining Sun (CAN); 1962	Solar Display	Dark Display (Family 4-j)
