= Gift Box =

American thoroughbred racehorse

- Sire: Twirling Candy
- Grandsire: Candy Ride
- Dam: Special Me
- Damsire: Unbridleds Song
- Sex: Stallion
- Foaled: March 23rd, 2013
- Country: USA
- Breeder: Machmer Hall
- Owner: Hronis Racing LLC
- Trainer: John W. Sadler
- Jockey: Joel Rosario
- Record: 18:6-6-2
- Earnings: $1,127,060

Major wins
- Santa Anita Handicap (2019); San Antonio Handicap (2018-2019)

Gift Box (foaled March 23, 2013) is an American Thoroughbred racehorse and the winner of the 2019 Santa Anita Handicap .

== Career ==
Gift Box's first race was on August 22, 2015, at Saratoga, where he came in third. He picked up his next win in his second race at Belmont Park on October 3, 2015.

He came in 3rd place in his first graded race, at the Grade 2 Remsen Stakes on November 28, 2015. He then picked up another win at Belmont on May 26, 2015.

His next win did not come until March 24th, 2018, when he won at the Aqueduct. He turned his career around when he won the Grade-2 San Antonio Handicap on December 26, 2018. This was his first victory in a graded race.

His next race was on April 6, 2019. He competed in his second Grade-1 race, this time at the Santa Anita Handicap, where he was victorious.

He came in 2nd at the May 27th, 2019 Gold Cup at Santa Anita Stakes and then came in 4th at the June 15th, 2019 Stephen Foster Handicap. However, he competed in one last race in 2019 - the December 28th, 2019 San Antonio Handicap, where he won the race for the second time.

== Pedigree ==
Pedigree of Gift Box (USA), 2013
Sire Twirling Candy (USA) 2007	Candy Ride (ARG); 1999	Ride the Rails	Cryptoclearance
Sire Twirling Candy (USA) 2007	Candy Ride (ARG); 1999	Ride the Rails	Herbalesian
Sire Twirling Candy (USA) 2007	Candy Ride (ARG); 1999	Candy Girl	Candy Stripes
Sire Twirling Candy (USA) 2007	Candy Ride (ARG); 1999	Candy Girl	City Girl
Sire Twirling Candy (USA) 2007	House of Danzing (USA); 2002	Chester House	Mr. Prospector
Sire Twirling Candy (USA) 2007	House of Danzing (USA); 2002	Chester House	Toussaud
Sire Twirling Candy (USA) 2007	House of Danzing (USA); 2002	Danzing Crown	Danzig
Sire Twirling Candy (USA) 2007	House of Danzing (USA); 2002	Danzing Crown	Crownette
Dam Special Me (USA) 2006	Unbridleds Song (USA); 1993	Unbridled	Fappiano
Dam Special Me (USA) 2006	Unbridleds Song (USA); 1993	Unbridled	Gana Facil
Dam Special Me (USA) 2006	Unbridleds Song (USA); 1993	Trolley Song	Caro
Dam Special Me (USA) 2006	Unbridleds Song (USA); 1993	Trolley Song	Lucky Spell
Dam Special Me (USA) 2006	Delta Danielle (CAN); 1991	Lord Avie	Lord Gaylord
Dam Special Me (USA) 2006	Delta Danielle (CAN); 1991	Lord Avie	Avie
Dam Special Me (USA) 2006	Delta Danielle (CAN); 1991	Domasco Danielle	Same Direction
Dam Special Me (USA) 2006	Delta Danielle (CAN); 1991	Domasco Danielle	Golden Delta
