= Sovereign Award for Outstanding Trainer =

The Sovereign Award for Outstanding Trainer is a Canadian thoroughbred horse racing honor given annually since 1975 by the Jockey Club of Canada. Part of the Sovereign Awards, the "Outstanding Trainer" laurel is similar to the Eclipse Award given to horse trainers in the United States.

Honourees:

- 1975 : Gil Rowntree
- 1976 : Lou Cavalaris, Jr.
- 1977 : R. K. "Red" Smith
- 1978 : Frank H. Merrill, Jr.
- 1979 : James E. Day
- 1980 : Gerry Belanger
- 1981 : Ron Brock
- 1982 : Bill Marko
- 1983 : Bill Marko
- 1984 : Michael J. Doyle
- 1985 : James E. Day
- 1986 : Roger Attfield
- 1987 : Roger Attfield
- 1988 : James E. Day
- 1989 : Roger Attfield
- 1990 : Roger Attfield
- 1991 : James E. Day
- 1992 : Phil England
- 1993 : Roger Attfield
- 1994 : Daniel Vella
- 1995 : Daniel Vella
- 1996 : Barbara Minshall
- 1997 : Mark Frostad
- 1998 : Michael Wright, Jr.
- 1999 : Mark Frostad
- 2000 : Mark Frostad
- 2001 : Robert Tiller
- 2002 : Roger Attfield
- 2003 : Robert Tiller
- 2004 : Robert Tiller
- 2005 : Reade Baker
- 2006 : Mark Casse
- 2007 : Mark Casse
- 2008 : Mark Casse
- 2009 : Roger Attfield
- 2010 : Roger Attfield
- 2011 : Mark Casse
- 2012 : Mark Casse
- 2013 : Mark Casse
- 2014 : Mark Casse
- 2015 : Mark Casse
- 2016 : Mark Casse
- 2017 : Mark Casse
- 2018 : Mark Casse
- 2019 : Mark Casse
- 2020 : Mark Casse
- 2021 : Mark Casse
- 2022 : Mark Casse
- 2023 : Mark Casse
- 2024 : Kevin Attard
- 2025 : Mark Casse
