= Northern Queen =

Canadian-bred Thoroughbred racehorse

- Sire: Nearctic
- Grandsire: Nearco
- Dam: Victoriana
- Damsire: Windfields
- Sex: Filly
- Foaled: 1962
- Country: Canada
- Colour: Dark Bay
- Breeder: E. P. Taylor
- Owner: Windfields Farm
- Trainer: 1) Tom Fleming; 2) Horatio Luro (at 3)
- Record: not found
- Earnings: not found

Major wins
- Shady Well Stakes (1964); Nettie Handicap (1965); Wonder Where Stakes (1965); Canadian Oaks (1965)

Awards
- Canadian Champion Three-Old Filly (1965)

Northern Queen (foaled 1962 in Ontario) was a Canadian Thoroughbred racehorse.

== Background ==
Northern Queen was a bay mare bred by E. P. Taylor and raced by his Windfields Farm, she was a daughter of Nearctic, sire of Northern Dancer. Her dam was Victoriana, a top producing mare who was a daughter of Windfields. She was trained from a base at Woodbine Racetrack in Toronto by Tom Fleming,

== Racing record ==
Among her starts at age two Northern Queen won the Shady Well Stakes and notably ran third against males in the Coronation Futurity. At age three in 1965, her race conditioning was taken over by future U.S. Racing Hall of Fame trainer, Horatio Luro. For Luro, Northern Queen won Canada's most important race for three-year-old fillies, the Canadian Oaks. In addition, she took the inaugural running of the Wonder Where Stakes and the Nettie Handicap. Although she competed with limited success against top fillies at tracks in New York State, Northern Queen still earned Canadian champion filly honours.

== Breeding record ==
Although Northern Queen was bred to major stallions such as Ribot, Hoist The Flag, and twice to Buckpasser, none of her foals met with much success in racing.
