= Wonder Gadot =

Canadian racehorse

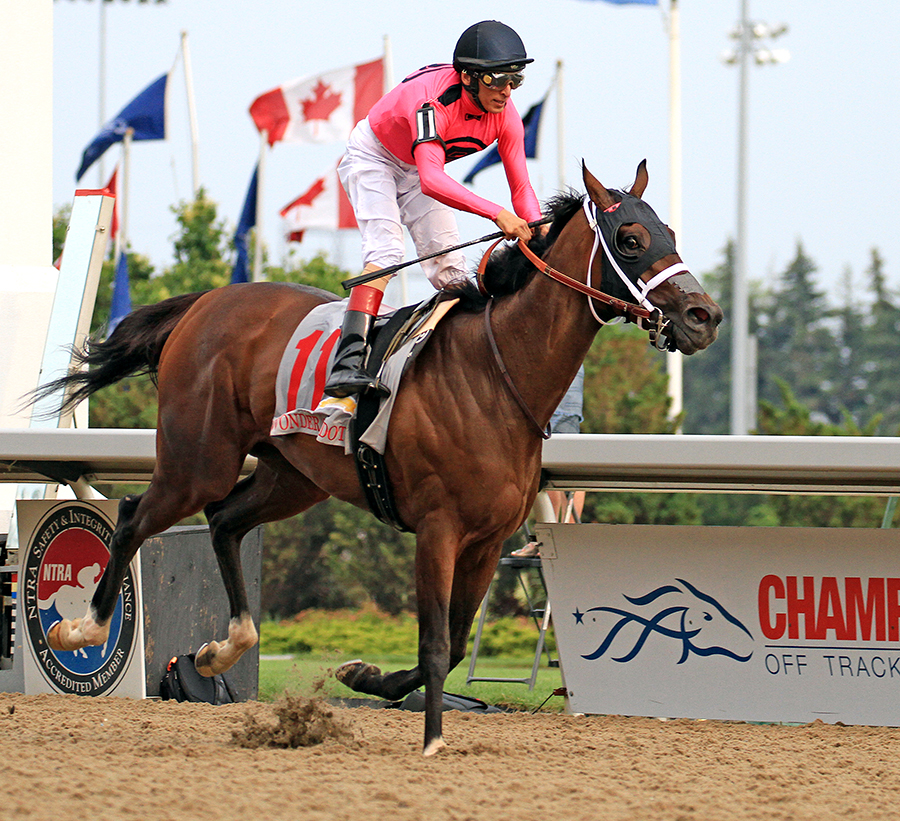
- Wonder Gadot winning the 2018 Queen's Plate
- Sire: Medaglia d'Oro
- Grandsire: El Prado
- Dam: Loving Vindication
- Damsire: Vindication
- Sex: Filly
- Foaled: May 22, 2015
- Country: Canada
- Colour: Dark bay
- Breeder: Anderson Farms Ont, Inc.
- Owner: Gary Barber
- Trainer: Mark E. Casse
- Record: 18: 5–5–4
- Earnings: US$1,524,861

Major wins
- Mazarine Stakes (2017); Demoiselle Stakes (2017); Queen's Plate (2018); Prince Of Wales Stakes (2018)

Awards
- Canadian Champion Two-Year-Old Filly (2017); Canadian Champion Three-Year-Old Filly (2018); Canadian Horse of the Year (2018)

Wonder Gadot (foaled May 22, 2015) is a Canadian Thoroughbred racehorse best known for winning the Queen's Plate and Prince of Wales Stakes, the first two legs of the Canadian Triple Crown, in 2018. As a two-year-old, she was named the Canadian Champion Two-Year-Old Filly after winning the Mazarine and Demoiselle Stakes. At age three, in addition to beating the colts twice in Canada, she was second in the Grade I Kentucky Oaks to Monomoy Girl. She was named the 2018 Canadian Horse of the Year and Champion Three-Year-Old Filly.

== Background ==
Wonder Gadot is a dark bay filly bred in Ontario by Anderson Farms. Her sire is Medaglia d'Oro, who won four Grade I races during his racing career, including the Travers Stakes in 2002 and the 2003 Whitney Handicap. He was also the runner-up in the 2002 Belmont Stakes and the 2004 Dubai World Cup. Medaglia d'Oro was retired to stud in 2005 and became a successful stallion who finished second on the American general sires list in 2015 and has finished in the top ten five other times. His other major runners include Rachel Alexandra, Songbird, Plum Pretty, Bolt d'Oro, Mshawish, Violence, and Vancouver. Wonder Gadot's dam Loving Vindication raced from 2007 to 2010, primarily in allowance company. She won two of her 13 races; one a victory in a maiden special weight at Belmont Park and the other an allowance win at Saratoga. In January 2011, she sold as a broodmare prospect to Anderson Farms for $180,000. Loving Vindication's first foal, a full brother to Wonder Gadot named Solemn Tribute, is a stakes winner who won the Tropical Park Derby in 2015 and finished second in the King Edward Stakes in 2016. Loving Vindication has also produced a 2016 Hard Spun filly named Hard Not to Love, the winner of the 2019 La Brea Stakes, a 2017 colt by Bodemeister, and a 2018 filly by Nyquist.

As a yearling, Anderson Farms sold Wonder Gadot at Keeneland September for $80,000 to Eisaman Equine. She was then pinhooked, or re-sold for a higher price, at the Ocala Breeders' Sale in April 2018. Gary Barber, former chairman and CEO of MGM, purchased her for $325,000 and sent her into training with Mark Casse, a member of the Canadian Horse Racing Hall of Fame.

Wonder Gadot is named for the actress Gal Gadot, who played Wonder Woman in the 2017 film of the same name.

== Racing career ==
=== 2017: two-year-old season ===
Wonder Gadot debuted at Woodbine Racetrack on August 26, 2017. In an unusual first step, she was entered not in a maiden special weight for her first race but in an allowance race against fillies who had raced before. In the seven-furlong turf race, she stalked the pace set by 32–1 longshot Without a Doubt, overtaking her entering the stretch and drawing away to win by four lengths.

Wonder Gadot made her next start in the Grade I Natalma Stakes, run at a distance of one mile on the turf. She went off as the 2–1 favorite in a field of nine that included fillies from Canada, America, and Europe. At the start, Golden Orb bumped into Capla Temptress, who in turn bumped into Wonder Gadot. The latter then settled in midpack for the first half mile before making her move around the final turn. However, she could not match the finishing kick of Capla Temptress and finished third.

On October 7, Wonder Gadot went off as the even-money favorite in a field of four in the Mazarine Stakes. Running for the first time on Woodbine's Tapeta surface, she went straight to the early lead and set an easy pace. Down the stretch, she drew away from the field to win by six lengths. Jockey Patrick Husbands commented that though she was more relaxed on the turf, "she's the real deal" on the main track.

The win encouraged her connections to enter her in the Breeders' Cup Juvenile Fillies at Del Mar Racetrack on November 4. After racing far back early, she encountered traffic problems and finished sixth. On December 2, she bounced back to win the Demoiselle Stakes on the main track at Aqueduct Racetrack by 3 3/4 lengths after stalking the early pace. "I was happy where she put me," said her new jockey, John Velazquez. "She was going very comfortable and got away from the horses pretty easily. She has a beautiful stride. I was very happy with the way she did it."

With her record of three wins (each coming on a different track surface) and a third from five starts, Wonder Gadot won the Sovereign Award for Canadian Champion Two-Year-Old Filly.

=== 2018: three-year-old season ===
Wonder Gadot began her three-year-old career in the United States, attempting to qualify on the Road to the Kentucky Oaks, the filly equivalent of the Kentucky Derby. Although she was winless in her four prep races, she was consistently in the money, finishing second in the Silverbulletday and Fantasy and third in the Rachel Alexandra and Fair Grounds Oaks. In the Kentucky Oaks, Wonder Gadot stalked the early pace, then dueled down the stretch with Monomoy Girl, closing at one point to within a head of the lead. Nearing the finish line, the fillies bumped repeatedly, causing Wonder Gadot to switch leads. Monomoy Girl crossed the finish line a half length in front, and the stewards decided to let the results stand. "I think it was going to be really close," said Casse. "But I think the stewards made the right call. To take a horse down in this type of race, I think it has to be pretty significant. As much I would have liked to have won, I understand the ruling."

On June 9, Wonder Gadot returned to Woodbine to contest the Woodbine Oaks, Canada's most prestigious race for three-year-old fillies. The 2–5 favorite, she broke poorly and settled well back, then made a wide move on the far turn to move into contention. However, Dixie Moon got a "great trip" along the rail and held off Wonder Gadot down the stretch to win by a head.

Prior to the Queen's Plate, Casse opted to put blinkers on Wonder Gadot in order to help her focus after several narrow losses. "It's tough to make that kind of call," said Casse. "Finally we just said, 'Look we've got to do it.' She has been so unlucky but she's so tough." Complicating matters, the area surrounding Woodbine Racetrack was under an extreme heat warning with temperatures of 35 °C (95 °F) and a humidex of 47 °C (117 °F). Casse told Barber before the race that "[the heat] will help her, because it's going to affect others, but it's not going to affect her."

In the Queen's Plate, Wonder Gadot was the 3–1 second choice on the morning line, going off at post time as the 2–1 favorite. Breaking from post 11, she tracked the pace set by stablemate Telekinesis from mid-pack and began to close ground around the far turn. Entering the stretch, Wonder Gadot took the lead and drew away to win by 4 3/4 lengths over 28–1 longshot Aheadbyacentury. With her victory, she became the fourth filly in eight years to win the Queen's Plate.

Following the race, Casse took care to cool down Wonder Gadot, fearing that she was having trouble catching her breath in the extreme heat. He compared her to 2014 Queen's Plate winner Lexie Lou, whom he also trained. "She reminds me a lot of Lexie Lou even though she probably weighs 200 pounds more than Lexie did but Lexie just thrived on running," he said. "There are horses that will just run and run and run and luckily this is one of them." He also stated that he was considering running Wonder Gadot in the Prince of Wales Stakes, the second leg of the Canadian Triple Crown, alongside Flameaway, a horse who previously ran in the 2018 Kentucky Derby.

Ultimately, Wonder Gadot made her next start in the Prince of Wales as Casse's sole entry in the six-horse race. Casse was concerned that Wonder Gadot would not be able to handle the sloppy track making her first start at Fort Erie Race Track and seriously considered scratching her from the race. However, he opted to keep her in, and she was sent off as the 2–5 favorite. Wonder Gadot broke well and went out to an early lead, pressured by Cooler Mike on the backstretch while the remainder of the field lagged behind. On the far turn, Wonder Gadot began to open up a solid lead and was not seriously challenged in the stretch, winning by 5 3/4 lengths over second choice Aheadbyacentury.

Casse and Barber's original plan was for Wonder Gadot to run in the Alabama Stakes on August 18, the same day as the Breeders' Stakes, the final leg of the Canadian Triple Crown. Following her Prince of Wales win, Casse said the possibility of a Canadian Triple Crown attempt was something he would discuss with Barber. He stated that his ultimate goal was a rematch with Monomoy Girl before the end of the year and a chance at the Eclipse Award for American Champion Three-Year-Old Filly. However, on July 28, it was announced that Wonder Gadot would make her next start in the Travers Stakes on August 25, becoming the first female starter in that race since Davona Dale in 1979. She raced close to the early pace but tired in the stretch and finished last.

Wonder Gadot then finished third in the Cotillion Stakes on September 22 behind Midnight Bisou and Monomoy Girl. She made her final start of the year in the Breeders' Cup Distaff on November 3, where she set the early pace before tiring in the stretch to finish ninth.

At the Sovereign Award ceremony held in April 2019, Wonder Gadot was named the 2018 Canadian Horse of the Year and Champion Three-Year-Old Filly.

=== 2019: four-year-old campaign ===
Wonder Gadot made her four-year-old debut in an allowance race at Oaklawn Park on March 8. She raced in fifth place before starting her move on the far turn. She briefly took the lead but was passed in the stretch by Go Google Yourself and finished second. In the Apple Blossom Handicap, she instead went to the early lead but tired and finished sixth behind Midnight Bisou.

In June, Casse announced that Wonder Gadot had been retired.

== Pedigree ==
Pedigree of Wonder Gadot, dark bay or brown filly, foaled May 22, 2015
Sire Medaglia d'Oro dark bay or brown 1999	El Prado gr. 1989	Sadler's Wells b. 1981	Northern Dancer
Sire Medaglia d'Oro dark bay or brown 1999	El Prado gr. 1989	Sadler's Wells b. 1981	Fairy Bridge
Sire Medaglia d'Oro dark bay or brown 1999	El Prado gr. 1989	Lady Capulet gr. 1974	Sir Ivor
Sire Medaglia d'Oro dark bay or brown 1999	El Prado gr. 1989	Lady Capulet gr. 1974	Cap and Bells
Sire Medaglia d'Oro dark bay or brown 1999	Cappucino Bay b. 1989	Bailjumper b. 1974	Damascus
Sire Medaglia d'Oro dark bay or brown 1999	Cappucino Bay b. 1989	Bailjumper b. 1974	Court Circuit
Sire Medaglia d'Oro dark bay or brown 1999	Cappucino Bay b. 1989	Dubbed In ch. 1973	Silent Screen
Sire Medaglia d'Oro dark bay or brown 1999	Cappucino Bay b. 1989	Dubbed In ch. 1973	Society Singer
Dam Loving Vindication dark bay or brown 2005	Vindication dkb/br. 2000	Seattle Slew dkb/br. 1974	Bold Reasoning
Dam Loving Vindication dark bay or brown 2005	Vindication dkb/br. 2000	Seattle Slew dkb/br. 1974	My Charmer
Dam Loving Vindication dark bay or brown 2005	Vindication dkb/br. 2000	Strawberry Reason dkb/br. 1992	Strawberry Road
Dam Loving Vindication dark bay or brown 2005	Vindication dkb/br. 2000	Strawberry Reason dkb/br. 1992	Pretty Reason
Dam Loving Vindication dark bay or brown 2005	Chimichurri ch. 2000	Elusive Quality b. 1993	Gone West
Dam Loving Vindication dark bay or brown 2005	Chimichurri ch. 2000	Elusive Quality b. 1993	Touch of Greatness
Dam Loving Vindication dark bay or brown 2005	Chimichurri ch. 2000	Hard Knocker ch. 1983	Raja Baba
Dam Loving Vindication dark bay or brown 2005	Chimichurri ch. 2000	Hard Knocker ch. 1983	Homespun (Family 17-b)
