= Milwaukee Appeal =

Canadian-bred Thoroughbred racehorse

- Sire: Milwaukee Brew
- Grandsire: Wild Again
- Dam: Appealing Forum
- Damsire: Open Forum
- Sex: Filly
- Foaled: 2006
- Country: Canada
- Colour: Bay
- Breeder: C.E.C. Farms
- Owner: C.E.C. Farms
- Trainer: Scott H. Fairlie
- Record: 11: 5-2-2
- Earnings: Can$649,938

Major wins
- Ontario Lassie Stakes (2008); Star Shoot Stakes (2009); Woodbine Oaks (2009)

Awards
- Sovereign Award for Champion 3-Year-Old Filly (2009)

Milwaukee Appeal (foaled 2006 in Ontario) is a Canadian thoroughbred racehorse.

== Background ==
Milwaukee Appeal was bred and raced by businessman Eugene George under his nom de course, C.E.C. Farms. She was sired by Milwaukee Brew, one of only three horses to ever win back-to-back runnings of the Santa Anita Handicap. Her grandsire, Wild Again, won the 1984 Breeders' Cup Classic. Her dam, Appealing Forum, is a daughter of Open Forum, who won the Risen Star Stakes and is a son of two-time Leading sire in North America and Canadian Horse Racing Hall of Fame inductee Deputy Minister. Based at Woodbine Racetrack in Toronto, Ontario. Milwaukee Appeal is trained by Scott Fairlie.

== Racing career ==
The filly's 2009 season was highlighted by a win in the Woodbine Oaks in which she was ridden by Canadian-born jockey Stewart Elliott, who won the 2004 Kentucky Derby aboard Smarty Jones. With Elliott aboard again, Milwaukee Appeal finished third in the 150th running of Canada's premier race, the Queen's Plate.

On July 12 of 2009, the filly went to Fort Erie for the annual Prince of Wales Stakes and placed second behind Gallant but ahead of Queen's Plate winner Eye of the Leopard.

In the Alabama Stakes, she finished second behind Careless Jewel.

== Pedigree ==
Pedigree of Milwaukee Appeal
Sire Milwaukee Brew	Wild Again	Icecapade	Nearctic
Sire Milwaukee Brew	Wild Again	Icecapade	Shenanigans
Sire Milwaukee Brew	Wild Again	Bushel-n-Peck	Khaled
Sire Milwaukee Brew	Wild Again	Bushel-n-Peck	Dama
Sire Milwaukee Brew	Ask Anita	Wolf Power	Flirting Around
Sire Milwaukee Brew	Ask Anita	Wolf Power	Pandora
Sire Milwaukee Brew	Ask Anita	Epanoui	Val de l'Orne
Sire Milwaukee Brew	Ask Anita	Epanoui	Swalthee
Dam Appealing Forum	Open Forum	Deputy Minister	Vice Regent
Dam Appealing Forum	Open Forum	Deputy Minister	Mint Copy
Dam Appealing Forum	Open Forum	Agretta	Graustark
Dam Appealing Forum	Open Forum	Agretta	Queen's Paradise
Dam Appealing Forum	Appealing Inez	Valid Appeal	In Reality
Dam Appealing Forum	Appealing Inez	Valid Appeal	Desert Trial
Dam Appealing Forum	Appealing Inez	Here's Inez	Venetian Court
Dam Appealing Forum	Appealing Inez	Here's Inez	Ky. Morn
