= Laffit Pincay Jr. Stakes =

- Class: Grade II
- Location: Santa Anita Park; Arcadia, California, United States
- Inaugurated: 1935 (as San Antonio Handicap)
- Race type: Thoroughbred - Flat racing
- Website: www.santaanita.com

Race information
- Distance: 1 1/16 miles (8.5 furlongs)
- Surface: Dirt
- Track: Left-handed
- Qualification: Three-year-olds & up
- Weight: Allowance
- Purse: $200,000 (2023)

The Laffit Pincay Jr. Stakes is an American Thoroughbred horse race held at Santa Anita Park in Arcadia, California. Run at 1 1/16 miles on the dirt, the race is for horses aged three and upward and carries a purse of $200,000.

The race was inaugurated in 1935 as the San Antonio Handicap. It has been a Grade II event since 1990, and was changed from handicap to allowance conditions in 2011. The race was traditionally run in February and was frequently used as a prep race for the Santa Anita Handicap. In 2017 the race was run once in February, and then again on December 26 (opening day of the Santa Anita winter-spring meet) to serve as a prep race for the Pegasus World Cup.

In November 2024 Santa Anita renamed the race in honor of Hall of Fame jockey Laffit Pincay Jr., who won the San Antonio five times over three decades.

== Records ==
Speed record:

- 1 1/8 miles – 1:46.20 – Vigors (1978)
- 1 1/16 miles – 1:42.36 – Nysos (2025)

Most wins:

- 2 - Gun Bow (1964, 1965)
- 2 - Gentlemen (1997, 1998)
- 2 - Game On Dude (2012, 2013)
- 2 - Hoppertunity (2016, 2017)
- 2 - Gift Box (2018,2019)

Most wins by a jockey:

- 7 - Bill Shoemaker (1951, 1953, 1960, 1964, 1967, 1971, 1985)

Most wins by a trainer:

- 8 - Bob Baffert (2003, 2010, 2012, 2013, 2016, 2017, 2022, 2025)

Most wins by an owner:

- 4 - Calumet Farm (1950, 1951, 1954, 1990)

== Winners ==
Year	Winner	Age	Jockey	Trainer	Owner	Time
Laffit Pincay Jr. Stakes
2025	Nysos	4	Flavien Prat	Bob Baffert	Baoma Corp, Mrs. John Magnier, Derrick Smith, Michael Tabor	1:42.36
2024	J B Strikes Back	3	Antonio Fresu	Doug F. O'Neill	Purple Rein Racing	1:43.80
San Antonio Stakes
2023	Newgrange	4	Irad Ortiz Jr.	Philip D'Amato	David A. Bernsen LLC, Little Red Feather Racing & Rockingham Ranch	1:42.79
2022	Country Grammer	5	Frankie Dettori	Bob Baffert	Zedan Racing, WinStar Farm & Commonwealth Thoroughbreds	1:43.45
2021	Express Train	4	Victor Espinoza	John Shirreffs	C R K Stable	1:44.82
2020	Kiss Today Goodbye	3	Mike E. Smith	J. Eric Kruljac	John Sondereker	1:43.37
2019	Gift Box	6	Joel Rosario	John W. Sadler	Hronis Racing	1:42.73
2018	Gift Box	5	Joel Rosario	John W. Sadler	Hronis Racing	1:43.88
2017 (December)	Giant Expectations	4	Gary Stevens	Peter Eurton	Exline- Border Racing, Gatto Racing & Garrett Zubok	1:43.07
2017 (February)	Hoppertunity	6	Flavien Prat	Bob Baffert	Watson/Pegram/Weitman	1:42.55
2016	Hoppertunity	5	Flavien Prat	Bob Baffert	Watson/Pegram/Weitman	1:48.47
2015	Shared Belief	4	Mike E. Smith	Jerry Hollendorfer	Jungle Racing	1:48.45
2014	Blingo	5	Aaron Gryder	John Shirreffs	Jerry & Ann Moss	1:47.95
2013	Game On Dude	6	Mike E. Smith	Bob Baffert	Diamond Pride/Lanni Family Trust	1:47.53
2012	Game On Dude	5	Chantal Sutherland	Bob Baffert	Diamond Pride/Lanni Family Trust/Mercedes Stable/Schiappa	1:46.88
2011	Gladding	4	Rafael Bejarano	John W. Sadler	C R K Stable	1:48.00
San Antonio Handicap
2010	Richard's Kid	5	Garrett Gomez	Bob Baffert	Zabeel Racing International	1:49.05
2009	Magnum	8	Joel Rosario	Darrell Vienna	Bill & Donna Mae Herrick	1:49.14
2008	Well Armed	5	Aaron Gryder	Eoin G. Harty	WinStar Farm	1:47.73
2007	Molengao	6	Garrett Gomez	Paulo Lobo	Stud TNT	1:48.67
2006	Spellbinder	5	Martin Pedroza	Richard Mandella	Ann & Jerry Moss	1:48.84
2005	Lundy's Liability	5	David Flores	Robert J. Frankel	Stud TNT/Mary Slack	1:49.05
2004	Pleasantly Perfect	6	Alex Solis	Richard Mandella	Diamond A Racing	1:47.25
2003	Congaree	5	Jerry Bailey	Bob Baffert	Stonerside Stable	1:47.60
2002	Redattore	7	Alex Solis	Richard Mandella	Luiz A. Taunay	1:48.66
2001	Guided Tour	5	Larry Melancon	Niall O'Callaghan	Morton Fink	1:48.26
2000	Budroyale	7	Garrett Gomez	Ted H. West	Jeffrey Sengara	1:48.70
1999	Free House	5	Chris McCarron	J. Paco Gonzalez	McCaffery & Toffan	1:48.54
1998	Gentlemen (ARG)	6	Gary Stevens	Richard Mandella	Randall D. Hubbard	1:47.60
1997	Gentlemen (ARG)	5	Gary Stevens	Richard Mandella	Randall D. Hubbard	1:47.38
1996	Alphabet Soup	5	Chris Antley	David Hofmans	Ridder Stable	1:49.96
1995	Best Pal	7	Chris McCarron	Richard Mandella	Golden Eagle Farm	1:47.43
1994	The Wicked North	5	Kent Desormeaux	David Bernstein	Philip Hersh	1:47.48
1993	Marquetry	6	Ed Delahoussaye	Robert J. Frankel	M. Engleson/R. Frankel	1:48.96
1992	Ibero	5	Alex Solis	Ron McAnally	I. Pavlovsky/F. Whitham	1:47.05
1991	Farma Way	4	Gary Stevens	D. Wayne Lukas	Quarter B. Farm	1:47.20
1990	Criminal Type	5	Alex Solis	D. Wayne Lukas	Calumet Farm	1:49.00
1989	Super Diamond	9	Laffit Pincay Jr.	Edwin J. Gregson	Roland & Ramona Sahm	1:48.80
1988	Judge Angelucci	5	Ed Delahoussaye	Charles Whittingham	Olin B. Gentry	1:48.60
1987	Bedside Promise	5	Gary Stevens	Robert L. Martin	Jawl Brothers	1:47.20
1986	Hatim	5	Laffit Pincay Jr.	John Gosden	Juddmonte Farms	1:47.40
1985	Lord At War	5	Bill Shoemaker	Charles Whittingham	Peter Perkins (L)	1:48.20
1984	Poley	5	Chris McCarron	Richard Mandella	Bretzfield & Oliver	1:48.00
1983	Bates Motel	4	Terry Lipham	John Gosden	J. Getty Phillips/M. Riordan	1:47.00
1982	Score Twenty Four	5	Pat Valenzuela	James Jordan	Score Stable/Purner Jr.	1:47.80
1981	Flying Paster	5	Chris McCarron	Gordon C. Campbell	Bernard J. Ridder	1:46.60
1980	Beau's Eagle	4	Donald Pierce	Larry Rose	Relatively Stable	1:48.40
1979	Tiller	5	Angel Cordero Jr.	David A. Whiteley	William Haggin Perry	1:47.00
1978	Vigors	5	Darrel McHargue	Larry J. Sterling	William R. Hawn	1:46.20
1977	Ancient Title	7	Sandy Hawley	Keith L. Stucki	Ethel Kirkland	1:47.80
1976	Lightning Mandate	5	Angel Cordero Jr.	Gary F. Jones	Golden Eagle Farm, et al.	1:48.20
1975	Cheriepe	5	Angel Santiago	W. Preston King	Camijo Stable	1:46.80
1974	Prince Dantan	4	Laffit Pincay Jr.	Pancho Martin	Sigmund Sommer	1:47.60
1973	Kennedy Road	5	Donald Pierce	Charles Whittingham	Helen G. Stollery	1:47.60
1972	Unconscious	4	Angel Cordero Jr.	John G. Canty	Arthur A. Seeligson Jr.	1:47.40
1971	Ack Ack	5	Bill Shoemaker	Charles Whittingham	Forked Lightning Ranch	1:47.00
1970	Dewan	5	Laffit Pincay Jr.	James W. Maloney	William Haggin Perry	1:47.60
1969	Praise Jay	5	Miguel Yanez	William C. Holmes	John M. Hudspeth	1:49.60
1968	Rising Market	4	Laffit Pincay Jr.	Ted Saladin	M/M Bert W. Martin	1:48.40
1967	Pretense	4	Bill Shoemaker	Charles Whittingham	Llangollen Farm	1:48.60
1966	Hill Rise	5	Manuel Ycaza	William B. Finnegan	El Peco Ranch	1:47.00
1965	Gun Bow	5	Manuel Ycaza	Edward A. Neloy	Gedney Farms	1:47.80
1964	Gun Bow	4	Bill Shoemaker	Edward A. Neloy	Gedney Farms	1:47.40
1963	Physician	6	Donald Pierce	Lynne A. Boice	Lynne A. Boice	1:51.00
1962	Olden Times	4	Alex Maese	Mesh Tenney	Rex C. Ellsworth	1:53.60
1961	American Comet	5	Willie Harmatz	Marty L. Fallon	C. W. Smith Ent., Inc.	1:48.60
1960	Bagdad	4	Bill Shoemaker	Joseph S. Dunn	Howard B. Keck	1:48.20
1959	Bug Brush	4	Angel Valenzuela	Robert L. Wheeler	C. V. Whitney	1:46.40
1958	Round Table	4	Bill Shoemaker	William Molter	Kerr Stable	1:46.80
1957	Terrang	4	Ismael Valenzuela	Carl A. Roles	Poltex Stable	1:47.40
1956	Mister Gus	5	William Boland	Charles Whittingham	Llangollen Farm	1:49.00
1955	Gigantic	4	Roy Lumm	J. Frank Laboyne	Joe W. Brown	1:48.40
1954	Mark-Ye-Well	5	Eddie Arcaro	Horace A. Jones	Calumet Farm	1:52.00
1953	Trusting	5	Bill Shoemaker	Joseph S. Dunn	Mrs. Rea Warner	1:49.20
1952	Phil D.	4	Raymond York	James Jordan	Mr. & Mrs. W. C. Martin	1:49.80
1951	All Blue	4	Bill Shoemaker	Horace A. Jones	Calumet Farm	1:49.40
1950	Ponder	4	Steve Brooks	Horace A. Jones	Calumet Farm	1:50.20
1949	Dinner Gong	4	Jack Westrope	Frank E. Childs	Abe Hirschberg	1:49.60
1948	Talon	6	Eddie Arcaro	Horatio Luro	Richard N. Ryan	1:49.40
1947	El Lobo	6	William Bailey	Stuart Hamblen	Stuart Hamblen	1:49.20
1946	First Fiddle	7	Johnny Longden	Edward Mulrenan	Mrs. Edward Mulrenan	1:50.00
1941	Mioland	4	Leon Haas	Tom Smith	Charles S. Howard	1:45.40
1940	Seabiscuit	7	Red Pollard	Tom Smith	Charles S. Howard	1:42.40
1939	Whichcee	5	Basil James	Darrell Cannon	Austin C. Taylor	1:49.40
1938	Aneroid	5	Charles Rosengarten	Dion K. Kerr	John A. Manfuso	1:50.00
1937	Rosemont	5	Harry Richards	Richard E. Handlen	William du Pont Jr.	1:50.20
1936	Time Supply	5	Tommy Luther	Carl A. Roles	Frank A. Carreaud	1:49.40
1935	Head Play	5	Charlie Kurtsinger	J. Thomas Taylor	Suzanne Mason	1:52.40
