= Ancient Title =

American-bred Thoroughbred racehorse

- Sire: Gummo
- Grandsire: Fleet Nasrullah
- Dam: Hi Little Gal
- Damsire: Bar Le Duc
- Sex: Gelding
- Foaled: 1970
- Country: United States
- Colour: Bay
- Breeder: William & Ethel Kirkland
- Owner: Kirkland Stable
- Trainer: Keith L. Stucki, Sr.
- Record: 57: 24-11-9
- Earnings: $1,252,791

Major wins
- California Breeders' Champion Stakes (1972); Sunny Slope Stakes (1972); Inglewood Handicap (1973); San Vicente Stakes (1973); Malibu Stakes (1974); Los Angeles Handicap (1974); Palos Verdes Handicap (1974); Charles H. Strub Stakes (1974); San Fernando Stakes (1974); Californian Stakes (1975, 1976); Hollywood Gold Cup (1975); San Carlos Handicap (1975); Whitney Handicap (1975); Caballero Handicap (1976); Del Mar Handicap (1977); Bel Air Handicap (1977); San Antonio Handicap (1977); San Pasqual Handicap (1978)

Awards
- California Horse of the Year (1974, 1975)

Honours
- United States Racing Hall of Fame (2008); Ancient Title Handicap at Santa Anita Park
- Last updated on October 2, 2007

Ancient Title (April 19, 1970 – September 1, 1981) was an American Thoroughbred Hall of Fame racehorse.

== Background ==
Foaled in California, he was bred by William and Ethel Kirkland and raced under Ethel Kirkland's name following her husband's death in 1972. She too died in 1976 and the horse then competed under the Kirkland Stable banner. Ancient was gelded before age three because of a very difficult disposition.

== Racing career ==
Ancient Title raced for seven years. He won many of the top Graded stakes races in California and was twice voted California Horse of the Year. Trained by Keith Stucki, Ancient Title began winning at age two with his most important victory coming in the 1972 California Breeders' Champion Stakes. He continued winning at age three but began to develop into a top level horse in 1974. That year, he became only the third horse to ever win all three races in the Strub Series. In addition to the Los Angeles and Palos Verdes Handicaps, he ran second to Prince Dantan in the Santa Anita Handicap and second to Tree Of Knowledge in the Hollywood Gold Cup. His 1974 performances earned him the first of two consecutive California Horse of the Year honors.

In 1975, Ancient Title's wins included the Californian Stakes, the San Carlos Handicap and the Hollywood Gold Cup. That year his handlers also brought him to race on the East Coast where he won the Whitney Handicap at New York's Saratoga Race Course and ran third to winner Wajima and runner-up Forego in the Marlboro Cup Invitational Handicap at Belmont Park. Ancient Title won more California stakes races in 1977 and after competing and winning in 1978 an injury led to his retirement. With earnings of $1,252,791, he ended his racing career as the richest California-bred horse to that time.

=== Race record ===
Date	Track	Race (Grade)	Distance	Finish	Jockey	Winner (Runner-Up)
1972 (2-year-old season)
6/15/1972	Hollywood Park	Maiden	D5F (fast)	2nd		Lucky Mike
7/7/1972	Hollywood Park	Maiden	D5.5F (fast)	1st		(Spin Lightning)
7/14/1972	Hollywood Park	Allowance	D5.5F (fast)	1st		(Crocation)
7/22/1972	Hollywood Park	Hollywood Juvenile Championship Stakes	D6F (fast)	8th		Bold Liz
8/11/1972	Del Mar	CTBA Sales Stakes	D6F (fast)	1st		(Bold Balcony)
8/25/1972	Del Mar	De Anza Stakes	D6F (fast)	3rd		Lucky Mike
10/18/1972	Santa Anita	Sunny Slope Stakes	D7F (fast)	1st		(Groshawk)
12/30/1972	Santa Anita	California Breeders' Champion Stakes	D7F (fast)	1st		(River Lad)
1973 (3-year-old season)
1/18/1973	Santa Anita	San Miguel Stakes (G3)	D6F (sloppy)	2nd		Linda's Chief
2/1/1973	Santa Anita	San Vicente Stakes (G3)	D7F (fast)	1st		(Linda's Chief)
3/1/1973	Santa Anita	San Jacinto Stakes (G2)	D8F (fast)	2nd		Linda's Chief
3/17/1973	Santa Anita	San Felipe Handicap (G2)	D8.5F (fast)	2nd		Linda's Chief
3/31/1973	Santa Anita	Santa Anita Derby (G1)	D9F (fast)	4th		Sham
4/28/1973	Hollywood Park	Inglewood Stakes (G2)	D7F (fast)	1st		(Groshawk)
5/19/1973	Hollywood Park	Will Rogers Handicap (G2)	T8F (firm)	2nd		Groshawk
12/27/1973	Santa Anita	Palos Verdes Handicap (G3)	D6F (fast)	3rd		Woodland Pines
1974 (4-year-old season)
1/12/1974	Santa Anita	Malibu Stakes (G2)	D7F (good)	1st		(Linda's Chief)
1/26/1974	Santa Anita	San Fernando Stakes (G2)	D9F (fast)	1st		(Linda's Chief)
2/9/1974	Santa Anita	Charles H. Strub Stakes (G1)	D10F (fast)	1st		(Dancing Pop)
3/10/1974	Santa Anita	Santa Anita Handicap (G1)	D10F (slow)	2nd		Prince Dantan
4/14/1974	Hollywood Park	Lakeside Handicap (G2)	T8.5F (firm)	5th		Matun
5/11/1974	Hollywood Park	Los Angeles Handicap (G2)	D7F (fast)	1st		(Woodland Pines)
5/27/1974	Hollywood Park	Californian Stakes (G1)	D8.5F (fast)	2nd		Quack
6/23/1974	Hollywood Park	Hollywood Gold Cup Invitational Handicap (G1)	D10F (fast)	2nd		Tree of Knowledge
12/26/1974	Santa Anita	Palos Verdes Handicap (G3)	D6F (fast)	1st		(Princely Native)
1975 (5-year-old season)
1/19/1975	Santa Anita	San Carlos Handicap (G2)	D7F (fast)	1st		(Hudson County)
2/23/1975	Santa Anita	San Antonio Stakes (G1)	D9F (fast)	3rd		Cheriepe
5/10/1975	Hollywood Park	Caballero Handicap	D8F (fast)	2nd		June's Love
5/26/1975	Hollywood Park	Californian Stakes (G1)	D8.5F (fast)	1st		(Big Band)
6/21/1975	Hollywood Park	Hollywood Gold Cup Invitational Handicap (G1)	D10F (fast)	1st		(Big Band)
7/4/1975	Hollywood Park	American Handicap (G2)	T9F (firm)	3rd		Montmartre
8/2/1975	Saratoga	Whitney Handicap (G2)	D9F (fast)	1st		(Group Plan)
9/1/1975	Belmont Park	Governor Stakes (G1)	D9F (fast)	3rd		Wajima
9/13/1975	Belmont Park	Marlboro Cup Invitational Handicap (G1)	D10F (fast)	3rd		Wajima
11/1/1975	Santa Anita	National Championship Invitational	D10F (fast)	7th		Dulcia
1976 (6-year-old season)
2/22/1976	Santa Anita	San Antonio Stakes (G1)	D9F (fast)	10th		Lightning Mandate
3/7/1976	Santa Anita	Santa Anita Handicap (G1)	D10F (fast)	2nd		Royal Glint
5/8/1976	Hollywood Park	Caballero Handicap (G3)	D8F (fast)	1st		(Big Destiny)
5/23/1976	Hollywood Park	Californian Stakes (G1)	D8.5F (fast)	1st		(Pay Tribute)
6/20/1976	Hollywood Park	Hollywood Gold Cup Handicap (G1)	D10F (fast)	6th		Pay Tribute
7/4/1976	Hollywood Park	American Handicap (G2)	T9F (firm)	5th		King Pellinore
12/28/1976	Santa Anita	Palos Verdes Handicap	D6F (fast)	3rd		Maheras
1977 (7-year-old season)
1/29/1977	Santa Anita	San Pasqual Handicap (G2)	D8.5F (fast)	5th		Uniformity
2/20/1977	Santa Anita	San Antonio Stakes (G1)	D9F (fast)	1st		(Double Discount)
3/6/1977	Santa Anita	Santa Anita Handicap (G1)	D10F (fast)	11th		Crystal Water
5/22/1977	Hollywood Park	Californian Stakes (G1)	D8.5F (fast)	3rd		Crystal Water
6/5/1977	Hollywood Park	Bel Air Handicap (G2)	D9F (fast)	1st		(Rajab)
6/18/1977	Hollywood Park	Hollywood Gold Cup Handicap (G1)	D10F (fast)	4th		Crystal Water
7/17/1977	Hollywood Park	Citation Handicap	D8.5F (fast)	4th		Painted Wagon
8/29/1977	Del Mar	Allowance	T8F (firm)	1st		(Chindo)
9/5/1977	Del Mar	Del Mar Handicap (G2)	D10F (fast)	1st		(Painted Wagon)
10/9/1977	Santa Anita	Carleton F. Burke Handicap (G2)	T10F (firm)	5th		Double Discount
10/23/1977	Santa Anita	Oak Tree Invitational (G1)	T12F (firm)	3rd		Crystal Water
1978 (8-year-old season)
1/29/1978	Santa Anita	San Pasqual Handicap (G2)	D8.5F (fast)	1st		(Mark's Place)
2/19/1978	Santa Anita	San Antonio Stakes (G1)	D9F (fast)	2nd		Vigors
7/30/1978	Del Mar	Allowance	D6F (fast)	1st		(Se Le Te)
8/19/1978	Del Mar	San Diego Handicap	D8.5F (fast)	DNF		Vic's Magic

== Retirement ==
For three years, Ancient Title lived in retirement at Rio Vista Farm near Atascadero, California operated by trainer Wallace Dollase. He reportedly died following surgery for colic problems on September 1, 1981.

== Honors ==
In 1985, the Oak Tree Racing Association honored the horse with the creation of the Ancient Title Handicap at Santa Anita Park.

On August 4, 2008, Ancient Title was only the fifth California bred inducted into the National Museum of Racing and Hall of Fame.
