= Bel Air Handicap =

Thoroughbred horse race

The Bel Air Handicap was a Thoroughbred horse race run in mid July at Hollywood Park Racetrack in Inglewood, California. Open to horses age three and older, it was contested on dirt at a distance of a mile and a sixteenth. In its final year it was a Grade III event offering a purse of U.S$.$100,000.

First run in 1939, the Bel Air Handicap was not run again until 1968. From 1980 through 1982 there was no race run.

In 1997, winner Crafty Friend equaled the Hollywood Park track record for a mile and a sixteenth with a time of 1:40 flat.

== Winners ==
Year	Winner	Age	Jockey	Trainer	Owner	Time
2001	Smile Again	6	Laffit Pincay, Jr.	Ron McAnally	Sidney & Jenny Craig	1:41.74
2000	Euchre	4	Alex Solis	Robert J. Frankel	Frank Stronach	1:41.76
1999	River Keen	7	Chris Antley	Bob Baffert	Hugo Reynolds	1:40.69
1998	Free House	4	Chris McCarron	J. Paco Gonzalez	Toffan & McCaffery	1:41.60
1997	Crafty Friend	4	Alex Solis	Wallace Dollase	The Thoroughbred Corp.	1:40.00
1996	Cleante	7	Chris McCarron	Ron McAnally	Janis R. Whitham	nf
1995	Soul of the Matter	4	Gary Stevens	Richard Mandella	Burt Bacharach	1:41.00

== Earlier winners ==
- 1994 - Region
- 1993 - Marquetry
- 1992 - Renegotiable
- 1991 - Twilight Agenda
- 1990 - Prospectors Gamble
- 1989 - Rahy
- 1988 - Cutlass Reality
- 1987 - Judge Angelucci
- 1986 - Super Diamond
- 1985 - My Habitony
- 1984 - Bid Us
- 1983 - Poley
- 1979 - Sirlad
- 1978 - Vigors
- 1977 - Ancient Title
- 1976 - Riot In Paris
- 1975 - Stardust Mel
- 1974 - Finalista
- 1973 - Tri Jet
- 1972 - Dating
- 1971 - What Goes On
- 1970 - Summer Sorrow
- 1969 - Boughs O' Holly
- 1968 - Nevada Marga
- 1939 - Leading Article
