= Moira (horse) =

Canadian-bred Thoroughbred racehorse

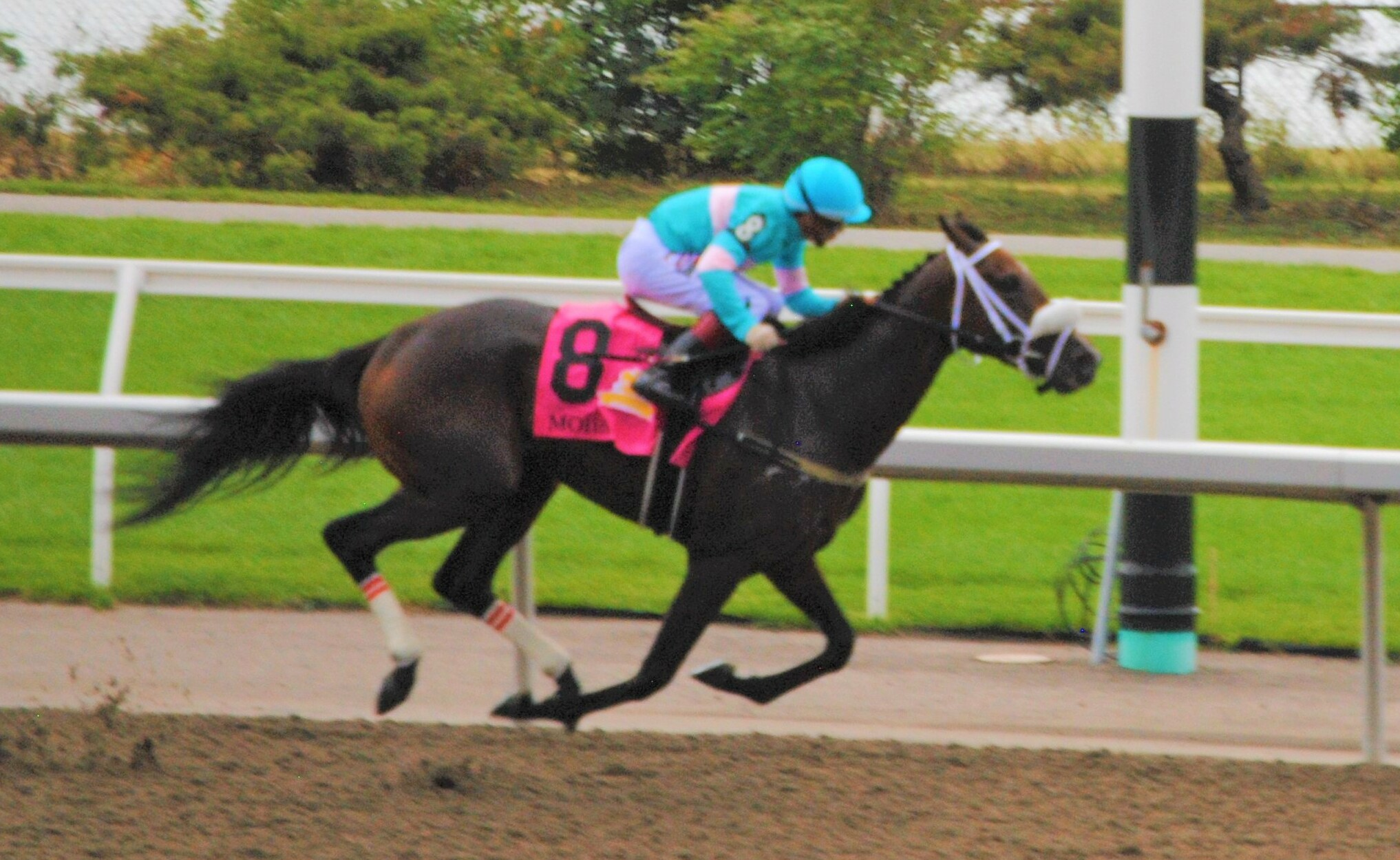
- Moira at the 2022 Queen's Plate
- Sire: Ghostzapper
- Grandsire: Awesome Again
- Dam: Devine Aida
- Damsire: Unbridled's Song
- Sex: Mare
- Foaled: April 11, 2019
- Country: Canada
- Color: Dark Bay
- Breeder: Adena Springs (ON)
- Owner: 1. Madaket Stables, SF Racing & X-Men Racing (Aug. 2021 – Nov. 2023); 2. DM Racing Ventures (Nov. 2023 - Jan. 2024); 3. Madaket Stables, SF Racing & X-Men Racing (Jan. 2024 – Nov. 2024); 4. Yu Long Investments (Nov. 2024 – )
- Trainer: 1. Kevin Attard (Aug. 2021 – Nov. 2024); 2. Chris Waller (Feb. 2025 – )
- Record: 19: 7 - 6 - 2
- Earnings: US$3,004,802

Major wins
- Princess Elizabeth Stakes (2021); Fury Stakes (2022); Woodbine Oaks (2022); Queen's Plate (2022); Canadian Stakes (2023); Beverly D. Stakes (2024); Breeders' Cup Filly & Mare Turf (2024)

Awards
- Canadian Horse of the Year (2022); Canadian Champion Three-Year-Old Filly (2022); American Champion Female Turf Horse (2024)
- Last updated on August 18, 2025

Moira (foaled April 11, 2019) is a champion Canadian-bred Thoroughbred racehorse. As a three-year-old she set a track record in the Queen's Plate while becoming the 38th filly to win the race. Later in her career she won the Grade 1 Breeders' Cup Filly & Mare Turf at Del Mar.

== Background ==
Moira is a dark bay mare who was bred in Ontario by Adena Springs. She was sired by Ghostzapper, the 2004 American Horse of the Year after winning the Breeders' Cup Classic. Her dam, Devine Aida, is a graded stakes-placed daughter of Unbridled's Song. The family traces to Begum, a blind daughter of Alydar who became an outstanding producer.

She was sold at the 2020 Keeneland Yearling Sale for $150,000 to X-Men Racing, a group of friends put together by bloodstock agent Donato Lanni. Lanni also brought American-based Madaket Stable and SF Racing into the partnership. "We put a fund together and we bought a dozen horses and she was one of them," said Lanni. "They're all guys that are in the horse business, some of them in the Standardbred business. But what they all have in common, besides being friends with me, is that they're all lucky."

She is named after the character Moira Rose, played by Catherine O'Hara, from Schitt's Creek. She is trained by Kevin Attard.

== Racing career ==
Moira made her first start on October 23, 2021, in the Princess Elizabeth Stakes at Woodbine Racetrack. She raced near the back of the pack for the first three-quarters of a mile, then started her move on the final turn. Bumped at the head of the stretch, she recovered her stride and made a strong late move to win by 4 1/4 lengths.

On November 28, Moira went off as the even-money favourite in the Mazarine Stakes. She settled near the back of the pack and made her move on the final turn, first on the outside and then on the inside as she looked for racing room. She closed late but was unable to get by Mrs. Barbara, who won by half a length.

=== 2022: three-year-old season ===
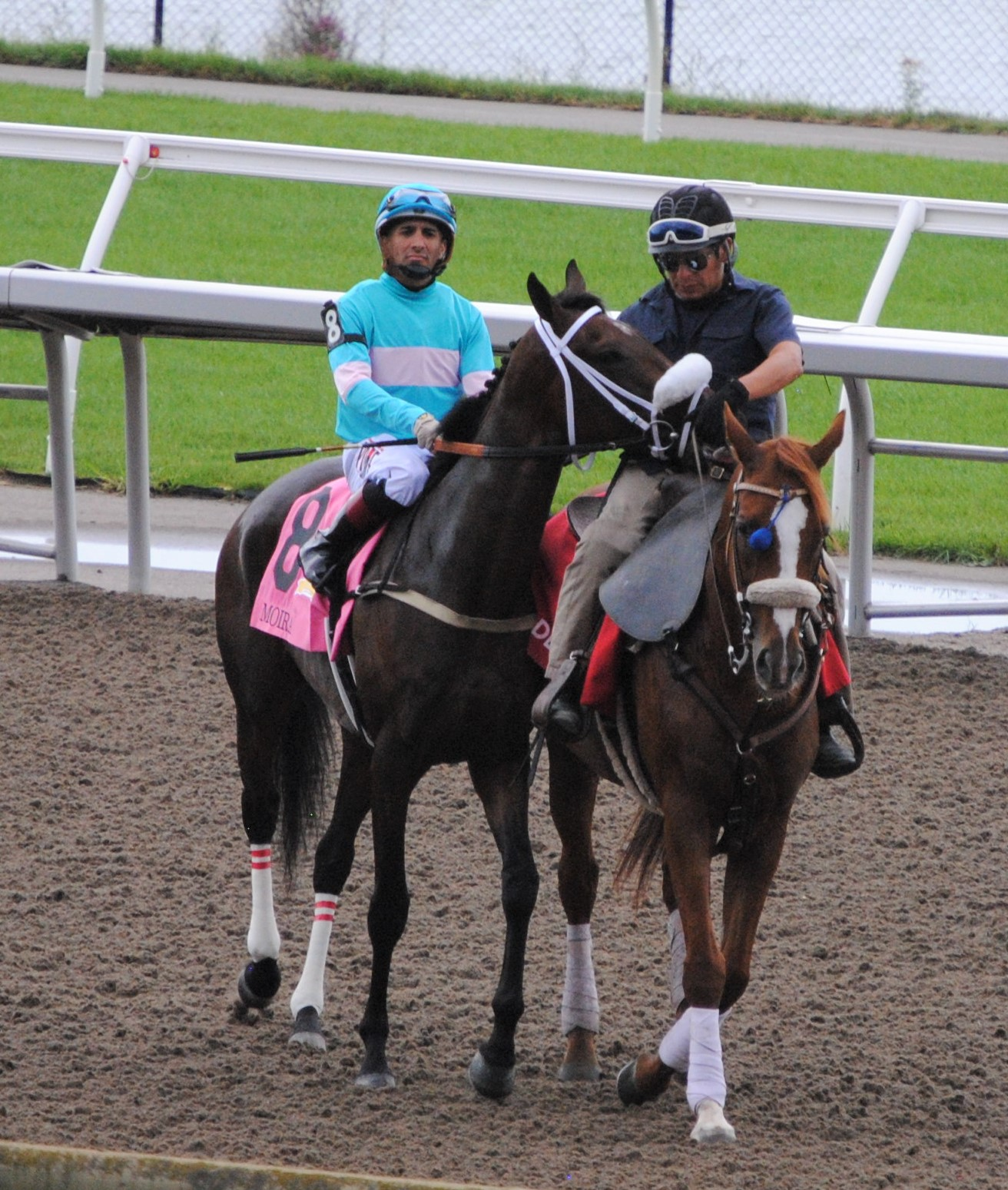
Moira in the post parade for the Queen's Plate

Moira made her three-year-old debut on June 11, 2022, in the Fury Stakes at Woodbine. She raced in mid-pack for the first half-mile, then moved four-wide as the field turned into the stretch. She reached the lead in mid-stretch then held off a late run by Pioneer's Edge to win by a head.

In the Woodbine Oaks on July 24, Moira went off as the even-money favourite in a field of ten. She was nervous in the paddock before the race and stepped on one her hind hooves, knocking off one shoe and bending the other. The paddock blacksmith tried to fix the problem but Attard ultimately decided to run her without either hind shoe. Moira settled in mid-pack for the first half-mile then made her move on the far turn while racing three-wide. She quickly took the lead near the top of the stretch and continued to draw away to win by 10 3/4 lengths. "We just sat there and saved as much ground as we could," said jockey Rafael Hernandez. "I knew horses were going to be stopping in front of me, so I just tried to get her away from them. By the three-eighths [pole], I was already where I wanted to be." Her time of 1:49.78 for nine furlongs was 0.84 faster than the colts ran the Plate Trial later on the same day at Woodbine.

Moira made her first start against male horses on August 21 in the Queen's Plate, the first leg of the Canadian Triple Crown. She faced a competitive field, headed by Rondure (Marine Stakes) and Sir for Sure (Plate Trial). The betting favourite for much of the day, Moira ultimately went off at odds of 9–5, the second choice in the betting to Rondure, who received late support. All other horses in the field went off at double-digit odds. Attard kept the filly in the saddling enclosure before the race, trying to keep her from getting over-excited. "I could see she was getting a little edgy just because so many people were around," said Attard. "She knew today was a different day."

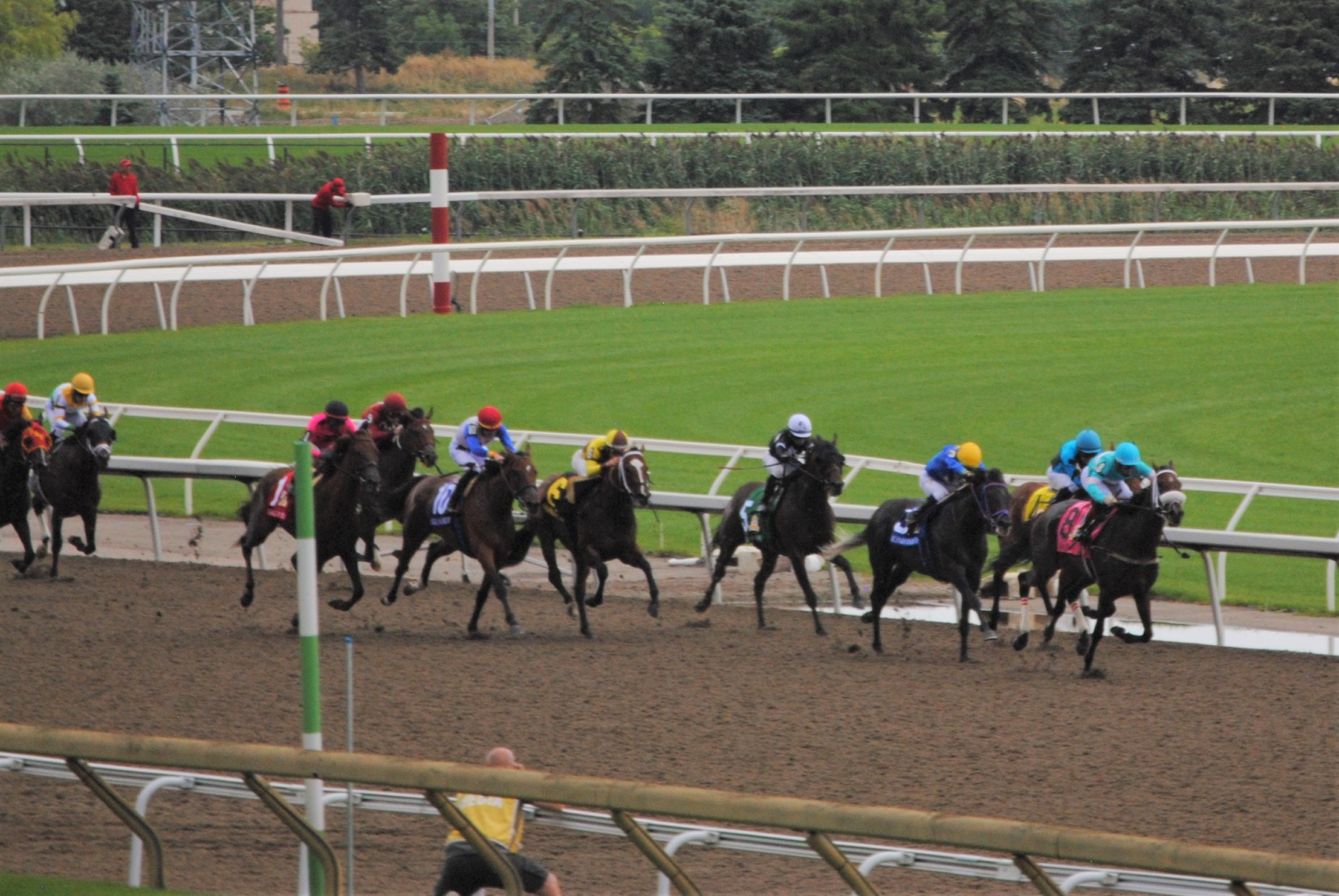
Moira takes the lead in the Queen's Plate

Moira settled near the back of the pack as the field moved down the stretch for the first time. She continued to race well back along the rail until the final turn when she was switched to the outside. Near the head of the stretch, she moved alongside the leaders and quickly drew away. She won easily by seven lengths, with Hernandez standing in the irons for the final strides. She set a track record for Woodbine's Tapeta surface of 2:01.48 for 1 1/4 miles, while running the fastest Queen's Plate in its 163-year history.

Moira is the 38th filly to win the Queen's Plate, with the fastest time in the post-1957 change to a 1^{1}/_{4} mile length and the eighth to win both the Woodbine Oaks and Queen's Plate. It was the first Queen's Plate win for owner Lanni and trainer Attard. "I've known [Attard] for 20 years, and this has been a dream – a dream of his, mine – being two Canadian boys to win this race," said Lanni. "This is unbelievable. What a filly."

Moira made her next start on October 8 in the Grade I E. P. Taylor Stakes, running over turf for the first time while facing older fillies and mares. Going off as the 6–5 favourite, she raced in the middle of a tightly bunched field. In the stretch, she lacked racing room so Hernandez moved her sharply to the inside, cutting off another horse, Lemista, in the process. Although Moira was tight against the rail, she began to inch her way to the lead, only to be beaten at the wire by Rougir, who made a late run on the outside. Moira was subsequently disqualified to eighth place for interference with Lemista.

Moira's final start of the year was the Breeders' Cup Filly & Mare Turf on November 5, where she was ridden by Frankie Dettori. Breaking from the outside post, she was well back early but closed steadily in the stretch to finish fifth.

=== 2023: four-year-old season ===
After her final race in 2023 Moira was sent to the Keeneland's Fasig-Tipton November Sale where she was sold for $3 million to DM Racing Ventures. Her original connections had seller's remorse at the same November Sale and bought her back for $3 million. Both last year and this year she was consigned by Hill 'n' Dale at Xalapa.

=== 2024: five-year-old season ===
Two days after winning the Grade 1 Breeders' Cup Filly and Mare Turf at Del Mar, Moira was sold for US$4.3 million at the Fasig-Tipton November Sale in Lexington. It was not publicly known who the new owners were however it was later revealed that Yulong Investments from China had bought Moira as well as other highly valued mares.

=== 2025: six-year-old season ===
Moira began racing for her new owners in Australia in April 2025 in the Doncaster Mile.

== Statistics ==
Date	Distance	Race	Grade	Track	Odds	Field	Finish	Winning Time	Winning (Losing) Margin	Jockey	Ref
2021 – two-year-old season
Oct 23, 2021	1 1/16 miles	Princess Elizabeth Stakes	Black-type	Woodbine	4.30	10	1	1:44.63	4 1/4 lengths	Justin Stein	
Nov 28, 2021	1 1/16 miles	Mazarine Stakes	III	Woodbine	1.15*	9	2	1:44.64	(1/2 length)	Justin Stein	
2022 – three-year-old season
Jun 11, 2022	7 furlongs	Fury Stakes	Black-type	Woodbine	2.25	7	1	1:22.81	head	Rafael Hernandez	
Jul 24, 2022	1 1/8 miles	Woodbine Oaks	Black-type (Note: The Woodbine Oaks and Queen's Plate are not eligible for grading as they are restricted to Canadian-bred horses)	Woodbine	1.00*	10	1	1:49.78	10 3/4 lengths	Rafael Hernandez	
Aug 21, 2022	1 1/4 miles	Queen's Plate	Black-type	Woodbine	1.80	11	1	2:01.48 (Note: New track record)	7 lengths	Rafael Hernandez	
Oct 8, 2022	1 1/4 miles	E.P. Taylor Stakes	I	Woodbine	1.15*	9	8 (Note: Moira crossed the finish line in second place but was disqualified to eighth place due to interference)	2:02.62	(neck)	Rafael Hernandez	
Nov 5, 2022	1 3/16 miles	Breeders' Cup Filly & Mare Turf	I	Keeneland	9.19	12	5	1:51.88	(6 lengths)	Frankie Dettori	
2023 – four-year-old season
Jun 3, 2023	1 1/16 miles	Belle Mahone Stakes	III	Woodbine	0.30*	7	2	1:44.49	(neck)	Patrick Husbands	
Jul 1, 2023	1 mile	Nassau Stakes	II	Woodbine	0.90*	9	2	1:40.03	(4 1/4 lengths)	Kazushi Kimura	
Aug 20, 2023	1 1/16 miles	Dance Smartly Stakes	II	Woodbine	1.10*	7	2	1:39.60	(1 length)	Rafael Hernandez	
Sep 9, 2023	abt. 1 1/8 miles	Canadian Stakes	II	Woodbine	2.95	6	1	1:46.04	6 1/4 lengths	Rafael Hernandez	
Oct 8, 2023	1 1/4 miles	E.P. Taylor Stakes	I	Woodbine	1.55*	10	3	2:04.20	(4 lengths)	Rafael Hernandez	
2024 – five-year-old season
Jul 13, 2024	1 1/8 miles	Diana Stakes	I	Saratoga	6.80	10	2	1:48.14	(3/4 length)	Tyler Gaffalione	
Aug 11, 2024	1 3/16 miles	Beverly D. Stakes	II	Colonial Downs	0.70*	5	1	1:54.80	head	José L. Ortiz	
Sep 14, 2024	1 1/4 miles	E.P. Taylor Stakes	I	Woodbine	0.90*	5	2	1:59.29	(3 1/2 lengths)	Rafael Hernandez	
Nov 2, 2024	1 3/8 miles	Breeders' Cup Filly & Mare Turf	I	Del Mar	5.80	12	1	2:14.95	1/2 length	Flavien Prat	
2025 – six-year-old season
Apr 5, 2025	1600 metres (Note: The distance of the Doncaster Mile is approximately one mile)	Doncaster Mile	I	Randwick	10.0	20	14	1:35.28	(4.9 lengths)	Zac Purton	
Aug 16, 2025	1400 metres (Note: The distance of the P.B. Lawrence Stakes is approximately seven furlongs)	P B Lawrence Stakes	II	Caulfield	9.0	9	4	1:25.96	(2.7 lengths)	Damian Lane	

Legend:
All-weather track Dirt Turf

An asterisk after the odds means Moira was the post-time favourite.

== Pedigree ==
Pedigree of Moira, bay filly, April 11, 2019
Sire Ghostzapper	Awesome Again	Deputy Minister	Vice Regent
Sire Ghostzapper	Awesome Again	Deputy Minister	Mint Copy
Sire Ghostzapper	Awesome Again	Primal Force	Blushing Groom (FR)
Sire Ghostzapper	Awesome Again	Primal Force	Prime Prospect
Sire Ghostzapper	Baby Zip	Relaunch	In Reality
Sire Ghostzapper	Baby Zip	Relaunch	Foggy Note
Sire Ghostzapper	Baby Zip	Thirty Zip	Tri Jet
Sire Ghostzapper	Baby Zip	Thirty Zip	Sailaway
Dam Devine Aida	Unbridled's Song	Unbridled	Fappiano
Dam Devine Aida	Unbridled's Song	Unbridled	Gana Facil
Dam Devine Aida	Unbridled's Song	Trolley Song	Caro (IRE)
Dam Devine Aida	Unbridled's Song	Trolley Song	Lucky Spell
Dam Devine Aida	Passion	Came Home	Gone West
Dam Devine Aida	Passion	Came Home	Nice Assay
Dam Devine Aida	Passion	Rajmata	Known Fact
Dam Devine Aida	Passion	Rajmata	Begum (family 1-l)
