= Woodbine Oaks =

- Class: Restricted
- Location: Woodbine Racetrack; Toronto, Ontario
- Inaugurated: 1956
- Race type: Thoroughbred - Flat racing
- Website: woodbineentertainment.com

Race information
- Distance: 1 1/8 miles (9 furlongs)
- Surface: Tapeta
- Track: Left-handed
- Qualification: Three-year-old fillies
- Weight: Scale Weight
- Purse: $500,000 CDN (2021)

The Woodbine Oaks is a Canadian Thoroughbred horse race run annually at Woodbine Racetrack in Toronto, Ontario. Inaugurated in 1956, it is the premier event for Canadian-foaled three-year-old fillies and the first leg of the Canadian Triple Tiara series.

Raced over a distance of 1 1/8 miles on Polytrack synthetic dirt, the Woodbine Oaks is currently sponsored by Budweiser and currently offers a purse of $391,200.

First run at 1 1/16 miles, since 1959 the distance has been set at 1 1/8 miles. Originally called the Canadian Oaks, in 2001 it was changed to the Labatt Woodbine Oaks, and then to the Woodbine Oaks presented by Budweiser in 2008.

== Records ==
Speed record:

- 1:48.80 - Square Angel (1973) (at current 1 1/8 miles)
- 1:45.80 - Yummy Mummy (1958) (at 1 1/16 miles)

Largest margin of victory:

- 13 lengths - Avowal (1982)

Most wins by a jockey:

- 8 - Sandy Hawley (1970, 1971, 1972, 1973, 1974, 1979, 1988, 1990)

Most wins by a trainer:

- 5 - James E. Day (1984, 1988, 1990, 1991, 2003)

Most wins by an owner:

- 7 - Sam-Son Farm (1984, 1988, 1990, 1991, 2000, 2001, 2004)

== Winners ==
Caption text
Year	Winner	Jockey	Trainer	Owner	Time
2026	Luster	John R. Velazquez	Josie Carroll	Gainesway Stables & Andrew Rosen	1:50.99

Year	Winner	Jockey	Trainer	Owner	Time
2025	No Time	John R. Velazquez	Mark E. Casse	Gary Barber	1:50.14
2024	Kin's Concerto	Sofia Vives	Josie Carroll	Chiefswood Stable	1:51.18
2023	Elysian Field	Sahin Civaci	Mark E. Casse	Team Valor International, Gary Barber	1:49.78
2022	Moira	Rafael Manuel Hernandez	Kevin Attard	X-Men Racing LLC, Madaket Stables LLC & SF Racing LLC	1:49.83
2021	Munnyfor Ro	Justin Stein	Kevin Attard	Raroma Stable	1:50.31
2020	Curlin's Voyage	Patrick Husbands	Josie Carroll	Hill 'n' Dale Equine Holdings Inc. & Windsor Boys Racing	1:50.04
2019	Desert Ride	Steve Bahen	Neil J. Howard	Sam-Son Farm	1:50.43
2018	Dixie Moon	Eurico Rosa Da Silva	Catherine Day Phillips	Sean & Dorothy Fitzhenry	1:50.38
2017	Holy Helena	Luis Contreras	Jimmy Jerkens	Stronach Stables	1:50.18
2016	Neshama	Eurico Rosa Da Silva	Catherine Day Phillips	Carnegie Hill Stable, Kingfield Racing Stable, Anderson Farms, & J.Fielding	1:52.34
2015	Academic	Justin Stein	Reade Baker	Bear Stables	1:48.86
2014	Lexie Lou	Patrick Husbands	Mark E. Casse	Gary Barber	1:49.77
2013	Nipissing	Steve Bahen	Rachel Halden	Chiefswood Stable	1:50.34
2012	Irish Mission	Alex Solis	Mark Frostad	Robert S. Evans	1:50.50
2011	Inglorious	Luis Contreras	Josie Carroll	Donver Stable	1:51.77
2010	Roan Inish	David J. Moran	Carolyn M. Costigan	Robert J. Costigan	1:50.53
2009	Milwaukee Appeal	Stewart Elliott	Scott H. Fairlie	C.E.C. Farms	1:49.84
2008	Ginger Brew	Javier Castellano	Brian A. Lynch	Stronach Stables	1:51.40
2007	Sealy Hill	Patrick Husbands	Mark E. Casse	Eugene Melnyk	1:50.68
2006	Kimchi	Patrick Husbands	Mark E. Casse	Seasoft Stable	1:52.23
2005	Gold Strike	Jim McAleney	Reade Baker	Dick Bonnycastle	1:51.63
2004	Eye of the Sphynx	Todd Kabel	Mark Frostad	Sam-Son Farm	1:53.11
2003	Too Late Now	Robert Landry	James E. Day	Edna Arrow	1:53.05
2002	Ginger Gold	Richard Dos Ramos	Sid C. Attard	Jim Dandy Stable	1:51.56
2001	Dancethruthedawn	Gary Boulanger	Mark Frostad	Sam-Son Farm	1:51.74
2000	Catch The Ring	Robert Landry	Mark Frostad	Sam-Son Farm	1:53.16
1999	Touch Dial	Mickey Walls	Tino Attard	Stronach Stables	1:51.13
1998	Kirby's Song	Todd Kabel	Tino Attard	Kirby Canada Farm	1:50.80
1997	Capdiva	Robert Landry	Roger Attfield	Legacy Thoroughbred	1:50.80
1996	Silent Fleet	Steven Bahen	Bernard Girault	Peter Chiodo	1:50.20
1995	Gal In A Ruckus	Herb McCauley	John T. Ward, Jr.	John C. Oxley	1:51.20
1994	Plenty Of Sugar	Richard Dos Ramos	Roger Attfield	Kinghaven/Ferguson	1:49.60
1993	Deputy Jane West	Robin Platts	Macdonald Benson	Lady Slipper Farm	1:52.40
1992	Hope For A Breeze	Herb McCauley	Paul Nielsen	Hopefield Farm	1:52.40
1991	Dance Smartly	Pat Day	James E. Day	Sam-Son Farm	1:51.20
1990	Tiffany's Secret	Sandy Hawley	James E. Day	Sam-Son Farm	1:51.20
1989	Blondeinamotel	Pat Day	Michael J. Doyle	Windhaven	1:52.40
1988	Tilt My Halo	Sandy Hawley	James E. Day	Sam-Son Farm	1:53.00
1987	One From Heaven	Gary Stahlbaum	Phil England	Richard R. Kennedy	1:51.40
1986	Playlist	Richard Dos Ramos	Roger Attfield	Kinghaven Farms	1:51.80
1985	La Lorgnette	David Clark	Macdonald Benson	Windfields Farm	1:51.20
1984	Classy 'n Smart	Irwin Driedger	James E. Day	Sam-Son Farm	1:51.80
1983	First Summer Day	David Clark	W. Millar	P. B. Ballentine	1:52.60
1982	Avowal	Brian Swatuk	Arthur H. Warner	Richard R. Kennedy	1:52.80
1981	Regent Miss	Richard Grubb	George S. Nemett	Whispering Hills	1:50.80
1980	Par Excellance	Gary Stahlbaum	Jacques Dumas	Knightsbridge-Big Boy	1:53.20
1979	Kamar	Sandy Hawley	Emile M. Allain	B. K. Y. Stable	1:51.20
1978	La Voyageuse	James Kelly	Yonnie Starr	Jean-Louis Levesque	1:50.40
1977	Northernette	Avelino Gomez	Jerry C. Meyer	Asadoorian/Cosentino	1:52.40
1976	Bye Bye Paris	Jeffrey Fell	Donnie Walker	Conn Smythe	1:51.40
1975	Reasonable Win	Richard Grubb	Fred H. Loschke	Hammer Kopf Farm	1:49.80
1974	Trudie Tudor	Sandy Hawley	John Morahan	D. Banks	1:55.40
1973	Square Angel	Sandy Hawley	Frank H. Merrill Jr.	W. Preston Gilbride	1:48.80
1972	Happy Victory	Sandy Hawley	David C. Brown	C. J. Jackson	1:51.80
1971	Lauries Dancer	Sandy Hawley	James C. Bentley	Helen G. Stollery	1:50.60
1970	South Ocean	Sandy Hawley	Gordon J. McCann	Charles P. B. Taylor	1:51.40
1969	Cool Mood	Johnny Sellers	John W. Russell	Kinghaven Farm	1:52.00
1968	Solometeor	William Boland	P. Richards	Windfields Farm	1:50.80
1967	All We Have	Eric Walsh	Warren Beasley	Warren Beasley	1:54.80
1966	Northern Minx	Jim Fitzsimmons	Yonnie Starr	Conn Smythe	1:51.60
1965	Northern Queen	Heliodoro Gustines	Horatio Luro	Windfields Farm	1:53.20
1964	Later Mel	Avelino Gomez	Willie Thurner	W. J. Farr	1:52.80
1963	Menedict	Paul Bohenko	Carl F. Chapman	H. A. Grant	1:55.40
1962	Flaming Page	Jim Fitzsimmons	Horatio Luro	Windfields Farm	1:52.00
1961	Maid o'North	Cliff Potts	Red Barnard	Shermanor Farm	1:53.60
1960	Menantic	Avelino Gomez	Gordon J. McCann	Windfields Farm	1:52.20
1959	Wonder Where	Al Coy	Yonnie Starr	Maloney & Smythe	1:52.20
1958	Yummy Mummy	E. A. Rodriguez	John Passero	William R. Beasley	1:45.80
1957	La Belle Rose	Avelino Gomez	Gordon J. McCann	E. P. Taylor	1:46.60
1956	Air Page	Ed Plesa	Willie Thurner	D. G. Ross	1:47.20
