= Sealy Hill =

Canadian-bred Thoroughbred racehorse

- Sire: Point Given
- Grandsire: Thunder Gulch
- Dam: Boston Twist
- Damsire: Boston Harbor
- Sex: Filly
- Foaled: April 14, 2004
- Died: February 23, 2021 (aged 16)
- Country: Canada
- Colour: Bay
- Breeder: Eugene Melnyk
- Owner: Melnyk Racing Stable
- Trainer: Mark E. Casse
- Record: 18: 7-4-3
- Earnings: $1,747,081

Major wins
- Glorious Song Stakes (2006); Bourbonette Breeders' Cup Stakes (2007); Woodbine Oaks (2007); Bison City Stakes (2007); Wonder Where Stakes (2007)

Awards
- 1st Canadian Triple Tiara Champion (2007); Canadian Champion 3-Year-Old Filly (2007); Canadian Champion Female Turf Horse (2007); Canadian Horse of the Year (2007)

Honours
- Canadian Horse Racing Hall of Fame (2013)

Sealy Hill (April 14, 2004 – February 23, 2021) was a Canadian Thoroughbred racehorse who won three Sovereign Awards in 2007, including Canadian Horse of the Year. In 2013, she was inducted into the Canadian Horse Racing Hall of Fame.

Owned and bred by Canadian businessman Eugene Melnyk, Sealy Hill was named for a village in Melnyk's adopted home, Barbados. She was sired by 2001 American Horse of the Year, Point Given. Her dam is Boston Twist, a daughter of the 1996 American Champion Two-Year-Old Colt and Breeders' Cup Juvenile winner, Boston Harbor.

Trained by Mark Casse, as a two-year-old, Sealy Hill got her first stakes win in the 2006 Glorious Song Stakes. In 2007, after defeating the highly regarded Panty Raid in the Bourbonette Breeders' Cup Stakes at Turfway Park in Kentucky, she finished far back of winner Rags to Riches in the Kentucky Oaks at Churchill Downs. Back home in Canada, the filly returned to form, winning four stakes races while becoming the first-ever winner of the Canadian Triple Tiara. On grass she earned a second in the Grade I E. P. Taylor Stakes and the GII Canadian Stakes.

For her 2007 performances, Sealy Hill was voted Canadian Champion 3-Year-Old Filly, Canadian Champion Female Turf Horse and the most prestigious honor in Canadian racing, Canadian Horse of the Year.

In 2008, Sealy Hill finished third in her second try at the E. P. Taylor Stakes, then finished a strong second in the 2008 Breeders' Cup Filly & Mare Turf behind Forever Together.

Casse said she was a temperamental filly who was her own worst enemy, especially in the starting gate. “Her mood swings and antics changed from minute to minute. You never knew which direction she was going to go, what she was going to do. At times she was more concerned with running over the competition than actually running by them.”

In 2013, Sealy Hill was inducted into the Canadian Horse Racing Hall of Fame.

She died on February 23, 2021.
