= Platel =

Platel is a surname. Notable people with the surname include:

- Alain Platel (born 1956), Belgian choreographer and director
- Carlins Platel (born 1999), American football player
- Élisabeth Platel (born 1959), French prima ballerina
- Nicolas-Joseph Platel (1777–1835), French cellist and composer
- Yves Platel (born 1977), Swiss swimmer
