= La Lorgnette =

Canadian-bred Thoroughbred racehorse

- Sire: Val de l'Orne
- Grandsire: Val de Loir
- Dam: The Temptress
- Damsire: Nijinsky
- Sex: Filly
- Foaled: 1982
- Country: Canada
- Colour: Bay
- Breeder: E. P. Taylor
- Owner: Windfields Farm
- Trainer: Macdonald Benson
- Record: 19: 5-8-2
- Earnings: $488,610

Major wins
- Natalma Stakes (1984); Canadian Oaks (1985) Canadian Classic Race wins: Queen's Plate (1985)

Awards
- Canadian Champion 3-Year-Old Filly (1985)

Honours
- La Lorgnette Stakes at Woodbine Racetrack

La Lorgnette (foaled 1982 in Ontario) is a Canadian Champion Thoroughbred racehorse.

== Background ==
A giant sized filly at 17.1 hands, she was bred and raced by E. P. Taylor's Windfields Farm. She was sired by the Val de l'Orne, a multiple stakes winner in France including the Group One Prix du Jockey Club. Val de L'Orne's sire was Val de Loir, the Leading sire in France for three straight years between 1973 and 1975. La Lorgnette's dam was The Temptress, a daughter of the 1970 British Triple Crown champion Nijinsky who was also bred at Windfields Farm. She was trained by Macdonald Benson.

== Racing career ==
La Lorgnette raced at age two with her best result a win in the 1984 Natalma Stakes. The following year she won the Canadian Oaks then, up against her male counterparts, defeated race favorite Imperial Choice to win Canada's most prestigious race, the Queen's Plate. In the ensuing Prince of Wales Stakes at the Fort Erie Racetrack, the two horses reversed their position. For her 1985 performances, La Lorgnette was voted the Sovereign Award as Canadian Champion 3-Year-Old Filly.

== Breeding record ==
Retired to broodmare duty, La Lorgnette has stood in Canada and in the United States. She is best known for producing Hawk Wing who was bred at John G. Sikura's Hill 'n' Dale Farms in Lexington, Kentucky. Hawk Wing was the top two-year-old of 2001 in the United Kingdom and Ireland and a winner of three Group One races. La Lorgnette's last foal, by Fusaichi Pegasus, was born in 2005.
