= Dancethruthedawn =

Canadian-bred Thoroughbred racehorse

- Sire: Mr. Prospector
- Grandsire: Raise a Native
- Dam: Dance Smartly
- Damsire: Danzig
- Sex: Filly
- Foaled: March 6, 1998 (age 27)
- Country: Canada
- Colour: Dark Bay
- Breeder: Sam-Son Farm
- Owner: Sam-Son Farm
- Trainer: Mark Frostad
- Record: 16: 7-2-3
- Earnings: $1,609,643

Major wins
- Princess Elizabeth Stakes (2000); Canadian Stakes (2001); Woodbine Oaks (2001); Go For Wand Handicap (2002); Doubledogdare Stakes (2002) Canadian Classic race wins: Queen's Plate (2001)

Awards
- Canadian Champion 3-Year-Old Filly
- Last updated on February 22, 2008

Dancethruthedawn (foaled March 6, 1998 in Ontario) is a Canadian Thoroughbred racehorse sired by leading United States stallion Mr. Prospector from Dance Smartly, a Canadian Triple Crown Champion mare and inductee of the Canadian and U.S. Racing Hall of Fame.

The 2001 winner of the Queen's Plate, Canada's most prestigious race, Dancethruthedawn was forced to retire in October 2002 following a leg fracture suffered while competing in the Spinster Stakes. Her performances that year earned her Canadian Champion 3-Year-Old Filly honors.

In the United States, at age four, Dancethruthedawn won the Grade I Go For Wand Handicap at Belmont Park and the Doubledogdare Stakes at Keeneland Race Course.
