= Eye of the Sphynx =

Canadian-bred Thoroughbred racehorse

- Sire: Smart Strike
- Grandsire: Mr. Prospector
- Dam: Queen of Egypt
- Damsire: Vice Regent
- Sex: Mare
- Foaled: 2001
- Country: Canada
- Colour: Bay
- Breeder: Sam-Son Farm
- Owner: Sam-Son Farm
- Trainer: Mark Frostad
- Record: 7: 4-2-0
- Earnings: Can$688,340

Major wins
- Fury Stakes (2004); Selene Stakes (2004); Woodbine Oaks (2004)

Awards
- Canadian Champion 3-Year-Old Filly (2004); Sovereign Award for Outstanding Broodmare (2014)

Eye of the Sphynx (foaled 2001 in Ontario) is a Canadian Champion Thoroughbred racehorse and successful broodmare.

Bred and raced by Sam-Son Farm, Eye of the Sphynx was trained by Mark Frostad. At age three, she won Canada's most important race for three-year-old fillies, the Woodbine Oaks. Her overall performance for that year earned her the 2004 Sovereign Award for Champion 3-Year-Old Filly. In 2014, Eye of the Sphynx received the Sovereign Award for Outstanding Broodmare.

Retired to broodmare duty at her owner's renowned stud farm, her first foal was sired by U.S. Racing Hall of Fame inductee and two-time Leading sire in North America, A.P. Indy. Born in 2006, the colt, Eye of the Leopard, won Canada's most prestigious horse race in 2009, the Queen's Plate.
