= Canadian Champion Two-Year-Old Filly =

The Canadian Champion Two-Year-Old Filly is a Canadian Thoroughbred horse racing honor. Created in 1975 by the Jockey Club of Canada, it is part of the Sovereign Awards program and is awarded annually to the top 2-Year-Old Filly Thoroughbred horse competing in Canada.

== Past winners ==
- 2024: Nitrogen
- 2023: Witwatersrand
- 2022: Cairo Consort
- 2021: Mrs. Barbara
- 2020: Lady Speightspeare
- 2019: Curlin's Voyage
- 2018: Bold Script
- 2017: Wonder Gadot
- 2016: Victory to Victory
- 2015: Catch a Glimpse
- 2014: Conquest Harlanate
- 2013: Ria Antonia
- 2012: Spring in the Air
- 2011: Tu Endie Wei
- 2010: Delightful Mary
- 2009: Biofuel and Negligee (tie)
- 2008: Van Lear Rose
- 2007: Dancing Allstar
- 2006: Catch the Thrill
- 2005: Knights Templar
- 2004: Simply Lovely
- 2003: My Vintage Port
- 2002: Brusque
- 2001: Ginger Gold
- 2000: Poetically
- 1999: Hello Seattle
- 1998: Fantasy Lake
- 1997: Primaly
- 1996: Larkwhistle
- 1995: Silken Cat
- 1994: Honky Tonk Tune
- 1993: Term Limits
- 1992: Deputy Jane West
- 1991: Bucky's Solution
- 1990: Dance Smartly
- 1989: Wavering Girl
- 1988: Legarto
- 1987: Phoenix Factor
- 1986: Ruling Angel
- 1985: Stage Flite
- 1984: Deceit Dancer
- 1983: Ada Prospect
- 1982: Candle Bright
- 1981: Choral Group
- 1980: Rainbow Connection
- 1979: Par Excellance
- 1978: Liz's Pride
- 1977: L'Alezane
- 1976: Northernette
- 1975: Seraphic
