= Mark E. Casse =

American racehorse trainer

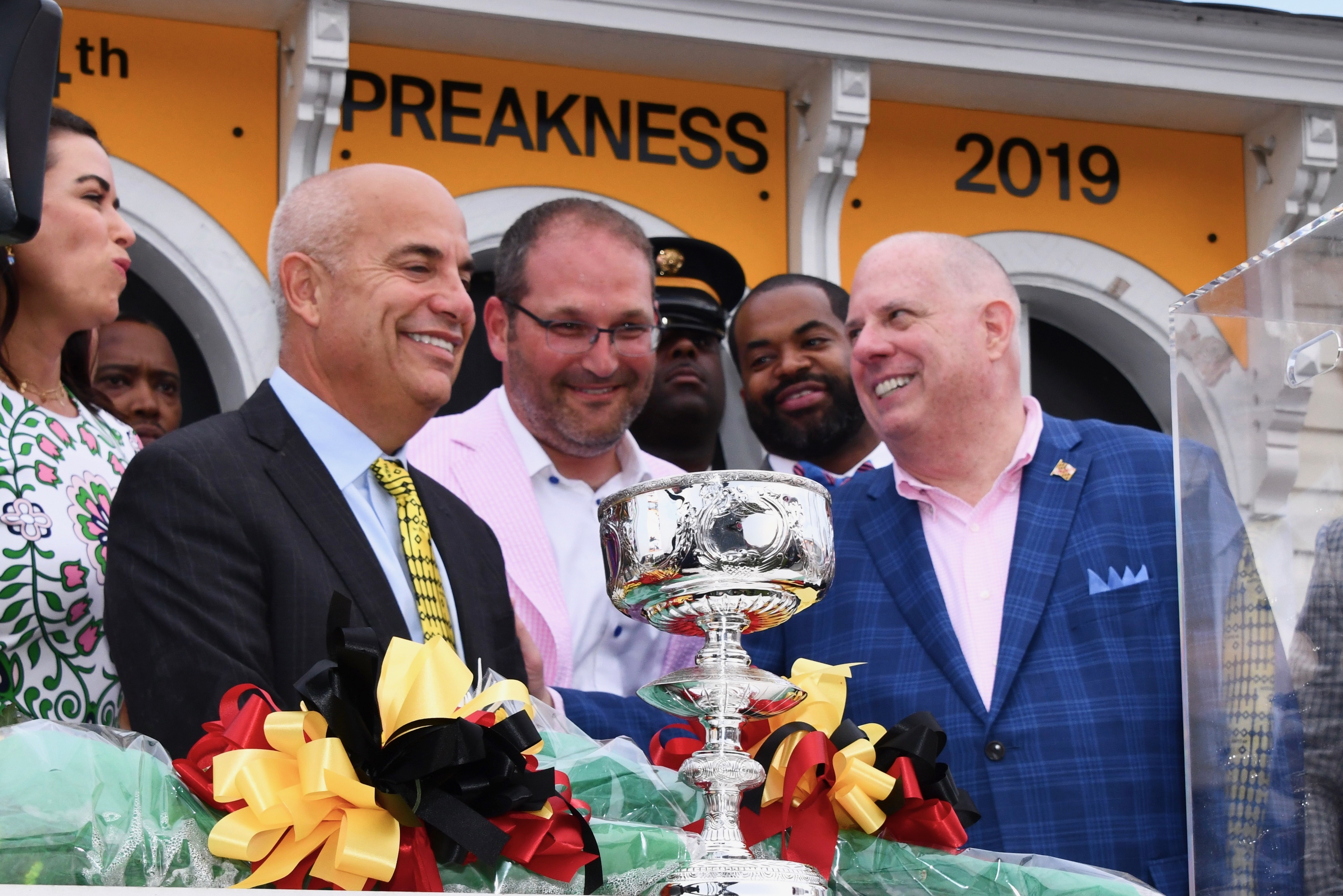
- Casse (left) at the trophy presentation for the 2019 Preakness Stakes

Personal information
- Born: February 14, 1961 (age 65) Indianapolis, Indiana
- Occupation: Trainer

Horse racing career
- Sport: Horse racing
- Career wins: 4,021+ (ongoing)

Major racing wins
- Metropolitan Handicap (2001); Stephen Foster Handicap (2011, 2015); Alcibiades Stakes (2012, 2013, 2017, 2022); Just A Game Stakes (2015); First Lady Stakes (2015); Jenny Wiley Stakes (2016); Pimlico Special (2016); United Nations Stakes (2016); Belmont Oaks Invitational (2016); Spinaway Stakes (2016); Breeders' Futurity Stakes (2016); Edgewood Stakes (2016, 2017); Gulfstream Park Oaks (2017); Arkansas Derby (2017); Dixie Handicap (2017); Fourstardave Handicap (2017, 2019, 2021); Del Mar Oaks (2017); Queen Elizabeth II Challenge Cup Stakes (2017); La Troienne Stakes (2018); Risen Star Stakes (2019); Alabama Stakes (2025) Canadian Stakes wins: Selene Stakes (2001, 2012, 2015, 2018); Natalma Stakes (2006, 2007, 2011, 2012, 2014, 2015, 2016); Grey Stakes (2006, 2010, 2011); Woodbine Oaks (2006, 2007, 2014); Wonder Where Stakes (2007, 2009, 2014, 2015); Bison City Stakes (2006, 2007, 2017); Summer Stakes (2013, 2014, 2015); Nassau Stakes (2015, 2016); Dance Smartly Stakes (2016); Woodbine Mile (2016, 2017) Canadian Triple Crown wins King's Plate (2014, 2018, 2023); Prince of Wales Stakes (2009, 2012, 2013, 2018); Breeders' Stakes (2007) International Stakes wins: Queen Anne Stakes (2016); Breeders' Cup wins: Breeders' Cup Mile (2015, 2017); Breeders' Cup Juvenile Fillies Turf (2015); Breeders' Cup Juvenile (2016); Breeders' Cup Filly & Mare Sprint (2018) U.S. Triple Crown series: Preakness Stakes (2019); Belmont Stakes (2019)

Racing awards
- Sovereign Award for Outstanding Trainer (2006-2008, 2011-2020)

Honours
- Canadian Horse Racing Hall of Fame (2016)

Significant horses
- Catch a Glimpse, Classic Empire, Lexie Lou, Sealy Hill, Sir Winston, Tepin, Uncaptured, War of Will, Wonder Gadot

Mark E. Casse (born February 14, 1961) is a Thoroughbred racehorse trainer whose most notable horses include 2015 American champion turf mare Tepin and Canadian Horses of the Year Sealy Hill (2007), Uncaptured (2012), Lexie Lou (2014), Catch A Glimpse (2015) and Wonder Gadot. He has won thirteen Sovereign Awards for outstanding trainer in Canada and has been the leading trainer at Woodbine Racetrack 14 times. In 2019, he won his first American Classic with War of Will in the Preakness Stakes.

== Background ==
Casse was born in Indianapolis, Indiana on February 14, 1961, to Norman Casse. He grew up in Ocala, Florida where his father ran Cardinal Hill Farm and was one of the founders of the Ocala Breeders' Sales Company. His brothers are John and Justin Casse, who are also involved in the racing industry. At age eight, Casse accompanied his father to the spring meet of the original Woodbine Racetrack. In 1973, father and son traveled to Churchill Downs and saw Secretariat win the 1973 Kentucky Derby.

Casse's third wife, Tina, is the Director of Operations for Casse Racing, a company they founded in 2002. Although they spend much of the year at Woodbine Racetrack in Canada, their home base is Moonshadow Farm in Florida.

== Racing career ==
Casse started to run his father's training operation in 1976 at the age of 15 and received his training license in Massachusetts when he was 17. He received a Kentucky trainer's license at age 18 and won his first race at Keeneland with Joe’s Coming on April 14, 1979. His first stakes winner was Amalie, who won the 1979 Indian Maid at Sportsman’s Park. He won the trainer's title at the Churchill Downs Spring meet of 1988, and also won four training titles at Turfway Park. He was Calumet Farm's private trainer for two years.

In the 1990s, Casse became the private trainer of Harry Mangurian and ran Mockingbird Farm, which at the time had 900 horses in the Ocala area. Manguarian dispersed most of his stock in 1999 and 2000, and the farm was bought by Eugene Melnyk, who renamed it Winding Oaks and become one of Casse's majort clients. Casse officially moved his center of operations to Woodbine Racetrack in 1998 though he had already been racing there for several years. Since moving to Canada, Casse has won a record nine Sovereign Awards as Canada's top trainer.

In 1999, Casse trained his first Sovereign Award winning horse, Exciting Story, who was champion two year-old colt. Two years later, Exciting Story would also earn Casse his first Grade I stakes win, the Metropolitan Handicap, at odds of 56–1. The next year, Casse captured his first Woodbine training title with 69 wins. Among his stakes winners was Added Edge, who was named Canada’s champion two-year-old.

Casse had developed a reputation for training good two-year-olds and selling them once they won, which kept him from winning most major races. This started to change around 2005 as Casse's client list started to grow. Casse earned his first Sovereign Award for outstanding trainer in 2005, and had his first Kentucky Derby starter, Seaside Retreat. The next year, his horses won eleven stakes races, a personal best, including the Woodbine Oaks, a prestigious race for Canadian-bred three-year-old fillies.

In 2007, Casse won his second Woodbine training title and second straight Sovereign Award. He trained his first Canadian Horse of the Year, Sealy Hill, who won the Canadian Triple Tiara and several other stakes races. In 2008, Sealy Hill would finish second in the Breeders' Cup Filly and Mare Turf and was eventually inducted into the Canadian Horse Racing Hall of Fame. Casse earned his 1,000th win on August 9, 2008, at Woodbine with Laragh.

In 2011, Casse won his fifth straight training title at Woodbine Toronto with a record 119 victories, which was nearly double the number of wins compiled by the runner-up. Among them were 13 stakes victories including the Grey Stakes, in which Casse saddled the top three finishers. He also earned his first Grade I win since 2001 when Pool Play won the Stephen Foster Stakes at odds of 36–1. In 2012, Casse ranked 7th in North America by trainer earnings. Uncaptured became his second Canadian Horse of the Year when, at the age of two, he won the Clarendon, Vandal, and Swynford stakes at Woodbine and the Iroquois and Kentucky Jockey Club Stakes at Churchill Downs. On July 6, 2014, Casse scored his first victory in the Queen's Plate, Canada's premier race, with filly Lexie Lou. She was later named Canadian Horse of the Year while Casse won his seventh Sovereign Award. Casse would finish the year ranked #6 in North America by earnings.

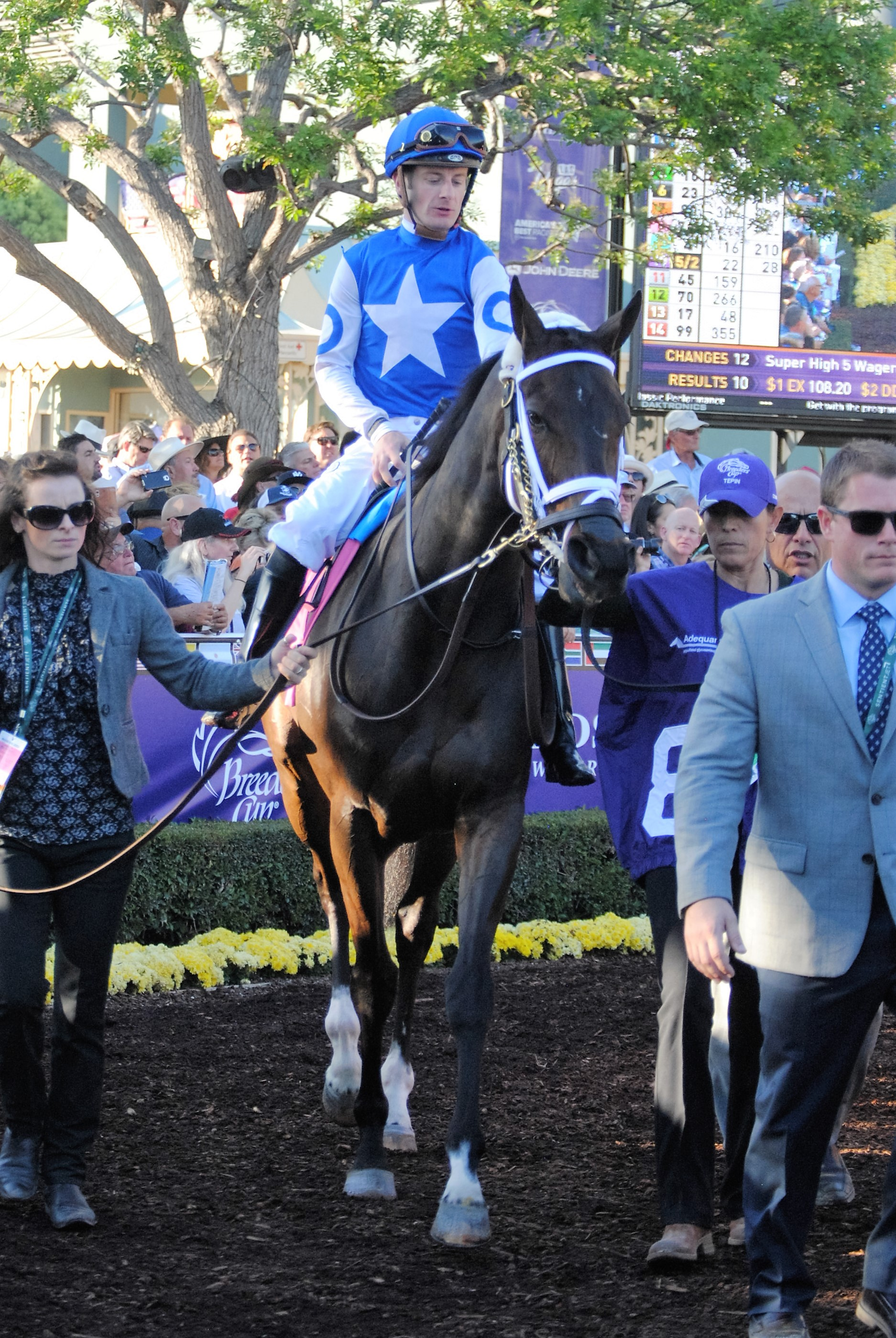
Casse (back right) and son Norman (right) with Tepin at the 2016 Breeders' Cup

In 2015, Casse scored his first two Breeders' Cup wins, with Catch a Glimpse in the Breeders' Cup Juvenile Fillies Turf, and with Tepin in the Breeders' Cup Mile. Tepin would be awarded the 2015 Eclipse Award for champion turf mare, while Catch A Glimpse was named the Canadian Horse of the Year. Unfortunately, a promising colt, Danzig Moon, who had finished fifth in the Kentucky Derby and was the favourite for the Queen's Plate, suffered a catastrophic breakdown during the Plate Trial. "If you knew why it happened, you could try to do it better or do it differently. So now we’ve got this fear and worry that it could happen again. It’s going to take a long time to be able to watch races because they (horses) are part of your family." That year, Casse was the #4 ranked trainer in North America by earnings.

In 2016, Casse won several major stakes races with Tepin, including the prestigious Queen Anne Stakes at Royal Ascot in England. Other major graded stakes winners included World Approval, Lexie Lou, Kaigun, Catch A Glimpse, Noble Bird and Pretty City Dancer. On May 14, he won his 2,000th race at Gulfstream Park, even though he himself was located at Woodbine at the time. "It's a great testimony to our team, which I'm very proud of," said Casse. At the 2016 Breeders' Cup, Classic Empire established himself as a leading contender for the 2017 Kentucky Derby by winning the Juvenile.

In 2016, Casse was inducted into the Canadian Horse Racing Hall of Fame.

On November 19, 2020, Casse won his 3,000th race with Souper Watson at Gulfstream Park West (formerly Calder Race Course). On July 17, 2025, he secured his 4,000th career victory at Colonial Downs with It's Witchcraft.
