= Ginger Gold (horse) =

Canadian-bred Thoroughbred racehorse

- Sire: Golden Gear
- Grandsire: Gulch
- Dam: Gleaming Glory
- Damsire: Vigors
- Sex: Mare
- Foaled: 1999
- Country: Canada
- Colour: Gray
- Breeder: Mel P. Lawson
- Owner: Jim Dandy Stable
- Trainer: Sid C. Attard
- Record: 25: 7-3-2
- Earnings: $1,065,448

Major wins
- Shady Well Stakes (2001); Princess Elizabeth Stakes (2001); Natalma Stakes (2001); Woodbine Oaks (2002)

Awards
- Canadian Champion 2-Year-Old Filly

Ginger Gold (foaled January 26, 1999) is a Canadian Champion filly Thoroughbred racehorse. Bred by Hamilton, Ontario lumber merchant, Mel Lawson, she was sired by multiple stakes winner Golden Gear, a son of 1988 American Champion Sprint Horse, Gulch. Her dam was Gleaming Glory and her damsire the highly regarded multiple American Grade 1 winner, Vigors.

Raced under Lawson's Jim Dandy Stable banner, Ginger Gold was trained by Sid Attard who guided her to a Champion season in 2001. At age three, she won the Woodbine Oaks, the premier event for Canadian-foaled three-year-old fillies.

Ginger Gold raced at age four with her best stakes race result a second-place finish in the Ontario Matron Stakes. She was retired to broodmare duty having earned in excess of $1 million. Her first foal, born in 2006, was sired by Claiborne Farm's, Pulpit.
