= Canadian Champion Three-Year-Old Filly =

The Canadian Champion Three-Year-Old Filly is a Canadian Thoroughbred horse racing honour created in 1975 by the Jockey Club of Canada. It is part of the Sovereign Awards program and is awarded annually to the top 3-Year-Old Filly Thoroughbred horse competing in Canada.

== Past winners ==
- 1973 : Square Angel
- 1975 : Momigi
- 1976 : Bye Bye Paris
- 1977 : Northernette
- 1978 : La Voyageuse
- 1979 : Kamar
- 1980 : Par Excellance
- 1981 : Rainbow Connection
- 1982 : Avowal
- 1983 : Northern Blossom
- 1984 : Classy 'n Smart
- 1985 : La Lorgnette
- 1986 : Carotene
- 1987 : Once From Heaven
- 1988 : Tilt My Halo
- 1989 : Blushing Katy
- 1990 : Lubicon
- 1991 : Dance Smartly
- 1992 : Hope For A Breeze
- 1993 : Deputy Jane West
- 1994 : Alywow
- 1995 : Scotzanna
- 1996 : Silent Fleet
- 1997 : Cotton Carnival
- 1998 : Kirby's Song
- 1999 : Gandria
- 2000 : Catch the Ring
- 2001 : Dancethruthedawn
- 2002 : Lady Shari
- 2003 : Too Late Now
- 2004 : Eye of the Sphynx
- 2005 : Gold Strike
- 2006 : Kimchi
- 2007 : Sealy Hill
- 2008 : Ginger Brew
- 2009 : Milwaukee Appeal
- 2010 : Biofuel
- 2011 : Inglorious
- 2012 : Irish Mission
- 2013 : Leigh Court
- 2014 : Lexie Lou
- 2015 : Academic
- 2016 : Caren
- 2017 : Holy Helena
- 2018 : Wonder Gadot
- 2019 : Desert Ride
- 2020 : Curlin's Voyage
- 2021 : Munnfor Ro
- 2022 : Moira
- 2023 : Elysian Field
- 2024 : Caitlinhergrtness
