= Fury Stakes =

- Class: Restricted
- Location: Woodbine Racetrack; Toronto, Ontario, Canada
- Inaugurated: 1956
- Race type: Thoroughbred - Flat racing
- Website: web.archive.org/web/20100316214346/http://www.woodbineentertainment.com:80/qct/default.asp

Race information
- Distance: 7 furlongs
- Surface: Tapeta
- Track: left-handed
- Qualification: Three-years-old, foaled in Ontario
- Weight: Assigned
- Purse: $114,375 (2016)

The Fury Stakes is a Thoroughbred horse race run annually at Woodbine Racetrack in Toronto, Ontario, Canada. Run in late April, the stakes race is open to three-Year-Old fillies who were foaled in the Province of Ontario. Raced over a distance of seven furlongs on Polytrack synthetic dirt, it currently offers a purse of $123,375.

The Fury Stakes was first run in 1956 at Fort Erie Racetrack in Fort Erie, Ontario as a 6 1/2 furlong sprint race. In 1970, the race was shifted to Woodbine Racetrack. Since inception it has been contested at various distances:

- 6.5 furlongs : 1956-1957, 1975
- 6 furlongs : 1958-1969, 1970-1972
- 7 furlongs : 1973-1974, 1976–present

== Winners since 1999 ==
Year	Winner	Jockey	Trainer	Owner	Time
2016	Tiz Imaginary	Luis Contreras	Michael J. Doyle	Windhaven Farms	1:25.43
2015	London Tower	Alan Garcia	Steve Owens	Steve Owens	1:22.43
2014	Wild Catomine	Gary Boulanger	Mark Casse	John C. Oxley	1:22.42
2013	Spring in the Air	Patrick Husbands	Mark Casse	John C. Oxley	1:23.51
2012	Northern Passion	Luis Contreras	Mark Casse	John C. Oxley	1:22.78
2011	Roxy Gap	Patrick Husbands	Mark Casse	Melnyk Racing Stables	1:22.95
2010	Resentless	Chantal Sutherland	Ian Howard	Donald Ross	1:21.66
2009	Woodsmoke	Tyler Pizarro	Mike Keogh	Gus Schickedanz	1:22.67
2008	Rumbling Cloud	Emma-Jayne Wilson	Sid C. Attard	Veronica Attard	1:11.46
2007	Like Mom Like Sons	Patrick Husbands	Sid C. Attard	Norseman Racing Stable	1:09.68
2006	Atlas Shrugs	Corey Fraser	Reade Baker	C. Roberts & J. Pepper	1:11.65
2005	Wholelottabourbon	David Clark	Nicholas Gonzalez	MAD Racing & Martha Gonzalez	1:12.89
2004	Eye of the Sphynx	Todd Kabel	Mark Frostad	Sam-Son Farm	1:23.32
2003	Elusive Thought	Jim McAleney	Reade Baker	R. Baker & J. Maine	1:24.10
2002	Gonetofarr	Jim McAleney	Reade Baker	George Farr	1:22.86
2001	Treasureinmyhand	Gary Boulanger	Mark Frostad	Sam-Son Farm	1:24.74
2000	Catch The Ring	Robert Landry	Mark Frostad	Sam-Son Farm	1:24.02
1999	Touch Dial	Mickey Walls	Tino Attard	Stronach Stables	1:23.11
