= Nearctic (horse) =

Canadian-bred Thoroughbred racehorse

- Sire: Nearco
- Grandsire: Pharos
- Dam: Lady Angela
- Damsire: Hyperion
- Sex: Stallion
- Foaled: February 11, 1954
- Died: July 27, 1973 (aged 19)
- Country: Canada
- Colour: Brown/black
- Breeder: E. P. Taylor
- Owner: Windfields Farm
- Trainer: Gordon J. McCann
- Record: 47: 21–5–3
- Earnings: $152,384

Major wins
- Clarendon Stakes (1956); Saratoga Special Stakes (1956); Victoria Stakes (1956); International Handicap (1957); Seaway Handicap (1958); Canadian Maturity Stakes (1958); Swynford Stakes (1958); Bold Venture Stakes (1958); Michigan Mile (1958)

Awards
- Canadian Horse of the Year (1958)

Honours
- Canadian Horse Racing Hall of Fame (1977); Nearctic Stakes at Woodbine Racetrack
- Last updated on January 26, 2010

Nearctic (February 11, 1954 – July 27, 1973) was a Canadian-bred Hall of Fame Thoroughbred racehorse.

== Background ==
Bred by E. P. Taylor, he was out of the Irish mare Lady Angela, a daughter of the British Champion sire Hyperion. He was sired by the extremely important stallion Nearco.

== Racing career ==
Conditioned for racing by future Canadian Hall of Fame trainer "Pete" McCann, Nearctic had his most successful season on the track at age four, when he won nine races and was voted Canadian Horse of the Year.

== Stud record ==
He retired to stand at stud at Taylor's Windfields Farm in Oshawa, Ontario. In 1967 he was syndicated for $1,050,000(US) and was moved to stand at Allaire du Pont's Woodstock Farm at Chesapeake City, Maryland. A successful stallion, Nearctic sired Kentucky Derby winner and the 20th century's greatest sire Northern Dancer. He also sired Icecapade, Ice Water, Nonoalco, Northern Queen, and Canadian Hall of Fame inductee, Cool Reception.

Nearctic was the grandsire of Northern Taste, Wild Again, Fanfreluche, Izvestia, and Son of Briartic, among others. He was also the damsire of Kennedy Road and the Canadian and U.S. Hall of Fame filly La Prevoyante.

Nearctic appears four generations back on both sides (dam and sire) of multiple graded stakes winning including Kentucky Derby champion thoroughbred race horse Big Brown.

Nearctic was euthanized at Woodstock Farm at age nineteen on July 27, 1973. He is buried in the farm's equine cemetery.

== Pedigree ==
Pedigree of Nearctic
Sire Nearco	Pharos	Phalaris	Polymelus
Sire Nearco	Pharos	Phalaris	Bromus
Sire Nearco	Pharos	Scapa Flow	Chaucer
Sire Nearco	Pharos	Scapa Flow	Anchora
Sire Nearco	Nogara	Havresac	Rabelais
Sire Nearco	Nogara	Havresac	Hors Concours
Sire Nearco	Nogara	Catnip	Spearmint
Sire Nearco	Nogara	Catnip	Sibola
Dam Lady Angela	Hyperion	Gainsborough	Bayardo
Dam Lady Angela	Hyperion	Gainsborough	Rosedrop
Dam Lady Angela	Hyperion	Selene	Chaucer
Dam Lady Angela	Hyperion	Selene	Serenissima
Dam Lady Angela	Sister Sarah	Abbots Trace	Tracery
Dam Lady Angela	Sister Sarah	Abbots Trace	Abbots Anne
Dam Lady Angela	Sister Sarah	Sarita	Swynford
Dam Lady Angela	Sister Sarah	Sarita	Molly Desmond

- Nearctic was inbred 4 x 4 to the stallion Chaucer, meaning that the latter appears twice in the fourth generation of his pedigree.

== Bibliography ==
- Lennox, Muriel Anne, Dark Horse : Unravelling The Mystery Of Nearctic (1997) Beach House Books ISBN 0-9699025-2-2
