= Lady Angela Stakes =

- Class: Restricted Stakes
- Location: Woodbine Racetrack; Toronto, Ontario, Canada
- Inaugurated: 1982
- Race type: Thoroughbred – Flat racing
- Website: www.woodbineentertainment.com/qct/default.asp

Race information
- Distance: 7 furlongs
- Surface: Tapeta
- Track: left-handed
- Qualification: Three-year-old fillies (Ontario Sire Stakes program)
- Purse: $100,375

The Lady Angela Stakes is a thoroughbred horse race run annually during the third week of May at Woodbine Racetrack in Toronto, Canada. An Ontario Sire Stakes, it is a restricted race for three-year-old fillies contested over a distance of seven furlongs on Polytrack synthetic dirt.

Inaugurated in 1982 at Greenwood Raceway, it was raced at a distance of six and one half furlongs in its first year but in 1983 was modified to its present seven furlongs. The event was moved to the Woodbine track in 1984.

The race is named for the Canadian Horse Racing Hall of Fame mare, Lady Angela. The Irish-bred daughter of the very important British sire Hyperion, she was the dam of Nearctic.

== Records ==
Speed record: (Through 1998, Woodbine times were recorded in fifths of a second. Since 1999 they are in hundredths of a second)

- 1:22.97 – Blonde Executive (2004)

Most wins by an owner:

- 2 – Eaton Hall Farm (1985, 2009)
- 2 – Knob Hill Stable (1988, 1992)

Most wins by a jockey:

- 4 – Mickey Walls (1992, 1996, 1999, 2000)

Most wins by a trainer:

- 2 – Michael J. Doyle (1985, 2009)
- 2 – Robert E. Barnett (2007, 2008)
- 2 – Reade Baker (2005, 2011)

== Winners ==
Year	Winner	Jockey	Trainer	Owner	Time
2015	Galina Point	Alan Garcia	Mark Casse	Gary Barber	1:23.35
2014	On Rainbow Bridge	Skye Chernetz	David Cotey	Triple K Stables	1:23.57
2013	I'm a Kittyhawk	David Moran	Robert Crean	J, M., N. & V. Earle/Crean	1:23.82
2012	Blues Dancing	Luis Contreras	Katerina Vassilieva	Domenic Triumbar	1:24.60
2011	Bear It's Time	Luis Contreras	Reade Baker	Bear Stables	1:21.88
2010	Jesters Jazz	Tyler Pizarro	Gail Cox	Craig Cameron	1:25.73
2009	Sans Sousi	Chantal Sutherland	Michael J. Doyle	Eaton Hall Farm & M. J. Doyle	1:24.97
2008	Anne's Purse	Eurico Rosa da Silva	Robert E. Barnett	Big C, Little C Stable	1:23.23
2007	You Will Love Me	Eurico Rosa da Silva	Robert E. Barnett	William G. Jones	1:24.50
2006	London Snow	Steve Bahen	John Charalambous	Fred J. Martin	1:24.61
2005	Bosskiri	James McAleney	Reade Baker	Harlequin Ranches et al.	1:23.88
2004	Blonde Executive	Richard Dos Ramos	A. Radlie Loney	Bruno Brothers Farms	1:22.97
2003	Deputy Cures Blues	Emile Ramsammy	Scotty McCulloch	Herbert W. Chambers	1:24.62
2002	Spanish Decree	Jake Barton	Frank Huarte	Frank Huarte	1:25.57
2001	Moonlight Affair	Emile Ramsammy	Tino Attard	Stronach Stable	1:26.37
2000	Comtesse Cristol	Mickey Walls	Jeffrey Stephens	Goldmart Farms	1:25.66
1999	Millashand	Mickey Walls	Ian Howard	Wayward Stable	1:24.66
1998	Barlee Mist	Kelly MacKay	Wray I. Lawrence	Barlee Farms	1:24.60
1997	No Foul Play	Steve Bahen	Margaret A. Spencer	Margaret A. Spencer	1:25.00
1996	Buxton Spice	Mickey Walls	Barbara J. Minshall	Minshall Farms	1:24.60
1995	Scotzanna	Robin Platts	Michael J. Wright	Bruno Schickedanz	1:23.60
1994	Holly Regent	Don Seymour	Peter DiPasquale	Peter DiPasquale	1:23.20
1993	Deputy Jane West	Robin Platts	Macdonald Benson	Lady Slipper Farm	1:23.20
1992	Debra's Victory	Mickey Walls	Phil England	Knob Hill Stable	1:27.60
1991	Bees 'N' Honey	Robert King, Jr.	Trevor Swan	Gambol/Sugar/Big Bux et al.	1:25.00
1990	Attraction Fatale	Sandy Hawley	Amanda Roxborough	Come By Chance Stable	1:25.60
1989	Lady Summerhill	Lloyd Duffy	Gil Rowntree	Summerhill Farms	1:25.20
1988	Volterra	Jacinto Vásquez	Patrick Collins	Knob Hill Stable	1:24.00
1987	Steady Hope	Richard Dos Ramos	Roger Attfield	Kinghaven Farms	1:25.00
1986	Pamper Me †	Marcos Malvaez	Jim Hutchinson	Robert G. Wilson	1:27.60
1985	Bessarabian	Gary Stahlbaum	Michael J. Doyle	Eaton Hall Farm	1:24.60
1984	Futurette	Robin Platts	James C. Bentley	John B. W. Carmichael	1:25.60
1983	Royalesse	Brian Swatuk	Arthur H. Warner	Richard R. Kennedy	1:27.40
1982	Tao Mina	Joey Belowus	Nick DiPaola	Riviera Racing Stable	1:21.00

* † In 1986, Miss Tressette finished first but was disqualified and set back to second.
