= Alywow Stakes =

- Class: Overnight stakes
- Location: Woodbine Racetrack; Toronto, Ontario, Canada
- Inaugurated: 2002
- Race type: Thoroughbred - Flat racing
- Website: www.woodbineentertainment.com

Race information
- Distance: 6 1/2 furlongs
- Surface: Turf
- Track: Left-handed
- Qualification: Three-year-old fillies
- Weight: Assigned
- Purse: $78,240 (2016)

The Alywow Stakes is a Canadian Thoroughbred horse race run annually during the second week of June at Woodbine Racetrack in Toronto, Ontario. Open to three-year-old fillies, the overnight stakes race is contested on turf over a distance of 6 1/2 furlongs.

Inaugurated in 2002, the race is named for the filly Alywow who died that year. Alywow was the 1994 Canadian Champion Three-Year-Old Filly and Horse of the Year. She was inducted in the Canadian Horse Racing Hall of Fame in 2009.

== Records ==
Speed record:

- 1:14.39 - Passion (2008)

Most wins by an owner:

- No owner has won this race more than once.

Most wins by a jockey:

- 4 - Patrick Husbands (2007, 2010, 2011, 2012)

Most wins by a trainer:

- 3 - Mark E. Casse (2007, 2012, 2015)
- 2 - Mark Frostad (2005, 2011)

== Winners ==
Year	Winner	Jockey	Trainer	Owner	Time
2025	Love Cervere	Eric Cancel	Miguel Clement	Edward and Beverly Seltzer	1:15.46
2024					
2023	Mohawk Trail	Adam Beschizza	Kelsey Danner		1:15.65
2022	Majestic D‘oro	Rafael Manuel Hernandez	Brendan P. Walsh		1:13.74
2021	Lady War Machine	Patrick Husbands	Josie Carroll		1.15.40
2020					
2019					
2018	Road to Victory	Gary Boulanger	Mark E. Casse		1:13.88
2017	Queen Del Valle	Edgard J. Zayas	Antonio Sano		1:12.93
2016	Miss Katie Mae (IRE)	Javier Castellano	H. Graham Motion	Crager/Hondros	1:16.10
2015	Mississippi Delta	Alan Garcia	Mark Casse	Jackpot Ranch/Rutherford	1:18.64
2014	Cristina's Halo	Chantal Sutherland	Vito Armata	Fig Star Stables	1:15.18
2013	Overheard	Eurico Rosa da Silva	Malcolm Pierce	Pin Oak Stable	1:14.93
2012	Dene Court	Patrick Husbands	Mark E. Casse	Eugene Melnyk	1:18.79
2011	New Normal	Patrick Husbands	Mark Frostad	Robert S. Evans	1:15.87
2010	Somme	Patrick Husbands	Josie Carroll	Jerry Jamgotchian	1:15.42
2009	Woodsmoke	Tyler Pizarro	Michael Keogh	Gus Schickedanz	1:15.44
2008	Passion	Javier Castellano	Todd A. Pletcher	Michael Tabor/Mrs. John Mercier/Derrick Smith	1:14.39
2007	Silky Smooth	Patrick Husbands	Mark E. Casse	Woodford Racing LLC	1:15.62
2006	Arravale	Emma-Jayne Wilson	Macdonald Benson	Robert J. Costigan	1:14.84
2005	Hatpin	Robert Landry	Mark Frostad	Sam-Son Farm	1:16.31
2004	Sweet Problem	James McAleney	Lorne Richards	K. K. Sangara	1:14.97
2003	Hour Of Justice	James McAleney	Reade Baker	Stronach Stable	1:17.37
2002	Lush Soldier	Mickey Walls	David R. Bell	John A. Franks	1:16.42
