= Steve Margolis =

American horse trainer

Personal information
- Born: September 8, 1963 (age 62) New York City, United States
- Occupation: Trainer

Horse racing career
- Sport: Horse racing
- Career wins: 602 (thru December 27, 2017)

Major racing wins
- John Battaglia Memorial Stakes (2002); WEBN Stakes (2002); Hallandale Beach Stakes (2003); Kentucky Cup Sprint Stakes (2003); Mr. Prospector Handicap (2004); Sorority Stakes (2007); Groupie Doll Stakes (2009); Delta Princess Stakes (2010); Rumson Stakes (2010); Letellier Memorial Stakes (2011); Silverbulletday Stakes (2011); Mardi Gras Stakes (2011, 2013); Monmouth Oaks (2012); Falls City Handicap (2013); Mint Julep Handicap (2013); Derby Trial Stakes (2014); Lukas Classic Stakes (2015); Pan Zareta Stakes (2015) Breeders' Cup wins: Breeders' Cup Sprint (2003)

Significant horses
- Cajun Beat, Request for Parole, Pickapocket, Country Day, Cool Bullet, Northern Belle, Lady Chace

Stephen R. "Steve" Margolis (born September 8, 1963 in New York City) is an American trainer of thoroughbred racehorses.

== Biography ==
Steve Margolis graduated from high school and would begin working as a groom in the sport of thoroughbred horse racing at Belmont Park in Elmont, Long Island, New York for Hall of Fame trainer John Veitch. In the 1990s Margolis worked for trainers Pat Byrne and Howard Tesher and later on for Stanley Hough. In 1997 he went to Kentucky with Stanley Hough as an assistant and in 2000 became a horse trainer himself. On September 15, 2000, Margolis won his first race as a trainer at Turfway Park with a horse named Her Great Affair. In 2002, he received another horse named Request for Parole with whom he won the WEBN and John Battaglia Memorial Stakes at Turfway Park. Request For Parole also finished fifth in the 2002 Kentucky Derby. In 2003, Margolis trained Baileys Edge to a win in the Mr. Prospector Handicap at Gulfstream Park. The same year, Cajun Beat brought Margolis victory in the Kentucky Cup Sprint at Turfway Park and then the most important win of his career in the Breeders' Cup Sprint. The same horse finished fourth in the Dubai Golden Shaheen at Nad Al Sheba Racecourse in Dubai.
