= Fanfreluche Stakes =

- Class: Restricted stakes
- Location: Woodbine Racetrack; Toronto, Ontario, Canada
- Inaugurated: 1981
- Race type: Thoroughbred - Flat racing
- Website: www.woodbineentertainment.com/qct/default.asp

Race information
- Distance: 6 furlongs
- Surface: Polytrack
- Track: left-handed
- Qualification: Two-year-old fillies, foaled in Ontario
- Weight: Assigned
- Purse: Can$112,455 (2016)

The Fanfreluche Stakes is a thoroughbred horse race run annually during the last week of October at Woodbine Racetrack in Toronto, Ontario, Canada. Restricted to two-year-old fillies foaled in Ontario, it is contested on dirt over a distance of six furlongs.

Inaugurated in 1981, the race is named in honor of J. Louis Lévesque's Hall of Fame filly, Fanfreluche.

== Records ==
Speed record: (Through 1998, Woodbine times were recorded in fifths of a second. Since 1999 they are in hundredths of a second)

- 1:09.30 - High Mist (2008)

Most wins by an owner:

- 3 - Eaton Hall Farm (1989, 2005, 2009)

Most wins by a jockey:

- 5 - David Clark (1981, 1983, 1995, 1999, 2007)

Most wins by a trainer:

- 4 - Reade Baker (1996, 2000, 2003, 2008)

== Winners since 1999 ==
Year	Winner	Jockey	Trainer	Owner	Time
2016	Will She	Jesse M. Campbell	Michael Keogh	Gustav Schickedanz	1:10.06
2015	Tiz Imaginary	Luis Contreras	Michael J. Doyle	Windhaven Farms	1:10.53
2014	Green Doctor	Jesse M. Campbell	John P. LeBlanc, Jr.	Paul Mouttet	1:10.07
2013	Executive Allure	Eurico Rosa Da Silva	Darwin Banach	William A. Sorokolit, Sr.	1:10.07
2012	Surtsey	Jermaine Bridmohan	Kevin Attard	Yvonne Schwabe	1:10.52
2011	Kitty's Got Class	Emma-Jayne Wilson	Michael P. De Paulo	Andrews/Colterjohns	1:10.78
2010	Inglorious	Chantal Sutherland	Josie Carroll	Donver Stable	1:10
2009	Bodua	Eurico Rosa da Silva	Michael J. Doyle	Eaton Hall Farm	1:10.48
2008	High Mist	Emma-Jayne Wilson	Reade Baker	N C Stable & Wendy Anderson	1:09.30
2007	Shilla	David Clark	Nicholas Gonzalez	Victura Farm	1:09.62
2006	Grandy's Glory	Steve Bahen	Michael P. DePaulo	Benjamin Hutzel	1:11.47
2005	Gumboots	Patrick Husbands	Josie Carroll	Eaton Hall Farm	1:10.09
2004	Simply Lovely	Steve Bahen	Robert P. Tiller	Rocco Marcello	1:12.41
2003	Ontheqt	James McAleney	Reade Baker	Janis Maine & Reade Baker	1:11.34
2002	Miss Crissy	Steve Bahen	Emile M. Allain	Harlequin Ranches	1:11.41
2001	Miss Noire	Raymond Sabourin	Emile M. Allain	Harlequin Ranches	1:11.00
2000	Ruby Shoes	Constant Montpellier	Reade Baker	A. Barkin & L. Feigman	1:11.80
1999	Golden Path	David Clark	Nickolas DeToro	Nickolas DeToro	1:10.63
