= Bull Page Stakes =

- Class: Restricted stakes
- Location: Woodbine Racetrack; Toronto, Ontario, Canada
- Inaugurated: 1976
- Race type: Thoroughbred - Flat racing
- Website: www.woodbineentertainment.com

Race information
- Distance: Six furlong sprint
- Surface: Polytrack
- Track: left-handed
- Qualification: Two-year-old Colts & Geldings (Ontario Sire Stakes program)
- Weight: Allowances
- Purse: $125,000

The Bull Page Stakes is a Thoroughbred horse race run annually in mid October at Woodbine Racetrack in Toronto, Ontario, Canada.

An Ontario Sire Stakes, it is a restricted race for two-year-old Colts and Geldings. It is raced over a distance of 6 furlongs on Polytrack and currently carries a purse of $125,000.

Inaugurated in 1976 as a five-and-a-half furlong sprint, it was modified to its present six furlong distance in 1980.

The race was named to honor E. P. Taylor's 1951 Canadian Horse of the Year and important sire, Bull Page.

The race was run in two divisions in 1979.

== Records ==
Speed record: (at current distance of 6 furlongs) (Through 1998, Woodbine times were recorded in fifths of a second. Since 1999 they are in hundredths of a second)

- 1:08.84 - Not Bourbon (2007) (new stakes and track record)

Most wins by an owner:

- 2 - Kingsbrook Farm (1983, 1993)
- 2 - Sam-Son Farm (1984, 1996)
- 2 - Woodford Racing LLC (2006, 2009)

Most wins by a jockey:

- 6 - Patrick Husbands (2006, 2009, 2010, 2011, 2013, 2014)

Most wins by a trainer:

- 3 - Ralph Biamonte (2011, 2012, 2013)
- 3 - Robert Tiller (1988, 2014, 2016)
- 2 - Glenn Magnusson (1982, 1992)
- 2 - Roger Attfield (1989, 2007)
- 2 - Michael J. Doyle (1993, 2002)
- 2 - Mark E. Casse (2006, 2009)

== Winners ==
Year	Winner	Jockey	Trainer	Owner	Time
2017	Latonka	Gary Boulanger	Denyse McClachrie	Denyse McClachrie, et al.	1:10.56
2016	Dragon's Cry	Sheena Ryan	Robert P. Tiller	Goldmart Farms	1:10.35
2015	Amis Gizmo	Luis Contreras	Josie Carroll	Tall Oaks Farm	1:10.06
2014	Goodoldhockeygame	Patrick Husbands	Robert Tiller	Frank D. Di Giulio Jr.	1:09.81
2013	Flashy Margaritta	Patrick Husbands	Ralph Biamonte	Lococo/Biamonte	1:09.99
2012	Double McTwist	Alex Solis	Ralph Biamonte	Bret Biamonte	1:09.75
2011	Jenna's Wabbit	Patrick Husbands	Ralph Biamonte	Lococo/Biamonte	1:09.91
2010	Bears Peak	Patrick Husbands	Reade Baker	Bear Stables	1:09.99
2009	Legal Review	Patrick Husbands	Mark E. Casse	Woodford Racing LLC	1:10.16
2008	Mean Green	Jono Jones	Sid C. Attard	Norseman Racing Stable	1:10.14
2007	Not Bourbon	Jono Jones	Roger Attfield	Charles E. Fipke	1:08.84
2006	Legal Move	Patrick Husbands	Mark E. Casse	Woodford Racing LLC	1:11.41
2005	Foxy Money	Richard Dos Ramos	Frank A. Passero, Jr.	Colebrook Farms	1:12.63
2004	Wholelottabourbon	David Clark	Nicholas Gonzalez	M.A.D. Racing/M. Gonzalez	1:11.22
2003	Stormthebarricade	Emile Ramsammy	Laurie Silvera	Laurie Silvera & partner	1:11.77
2002	Biddy's Lad	Chantal Sutherland	Michael J. Doyle	Springfield Stable & Dura Racing	1:11.25
2001	Molly's Wisdom	Emile Ramsammy	Vito Armata	Molinaro Stable	1:12.10
2000	Trailthefox	Robert Landry	Pierre Bellocq, Jr.	Frederick J. Liebau, Sr.	1:10.12
1999	Gallop'n Gold	Laurie Gulas	John DiMarco	Pat & Paul Boissonneault	1:10.96
1998	Indian Trouble	Steve Bahen	Danny Zita	My Way Farm	1:12.00
1997	Pino's Pride	Schemlin Montoute	Michael W. Wright	Mario Sinopoli	1:11.20
1996	Randy Regent	Mickey Walls	Mark Frostad	Sam-Son Farm	1:10.40
1995	Parisianprospector	Richard Dos Ramos	Joe Attard	J. R. Belanger	1:12.20
1994	Saints Leader	Robin Platts	Macdonald Benson	Augustin Stable	1:10.60
1993	O'Martin	Dave Penna	Michael J. Doyle	Kingsbrook Farm	1:12.20
1992	GST Blues	Dave Penna	Glenn Magnusson	Fonseca, Ward, Peters	1:12.40
1991	Cool Shot	Mickey Walls	Grant Pearce	Hillsbrook Farms	1:11.80
1990	Do's And Don't's	Jack Lauzon	Brian Kessel	Brian Kessel	1:10.00
1989	Ever Steady	Don Seymour	Roger Attfield	Kinghaven Farms	1:10.80
1988	Domasca Dan	Sandy Hawley	Robert P. Tiller	F. Digiulio, Sr. & F. Digiulio, Jr.	1:11.80
1987	Highland Ruckus	David Clark	Tony Mattine	Linmac Farms	1:11.00
1986	Fozzie Bear	Larry Attard	Tino Attard	V.C.L. Farms & F. Spatafora	1:11.60
1985	Dom Dancer	Dan Beckon	Gil Rowntree	B.K.Y. Stable	1:11.80
1984	Regal Remark	Jeffrey Fell	James E. Day	Sam-Son Farm	1:11.80
1983	Perfect Player	Dave Penna	Frank H. Merrill, Jr.	Kingsbrook Farm	1:11.40
1982	Haliburton Huskie	David Clark	Glenn Magnusson	G. Vasey & Partner	1:12.20
1981	Deputy Minister	Lloyd Duffy	Bill Marko	Centurion / Kinghaven Farms	1:11.20
1980	Moteral	John Bell	Emile M. Allain	Langill, O'Connor, Willcock	1:11.20
1979	Corvette Chris	Lloyd Duffy	Gerry Belanger	Edward B. Seedhouse	1:05.20
1979	My Only Love	Gary Stahlbaum	Jim Roberts	Mrs. M. Sutherland	1:05.00
1978	Vent d'Ouest	J. Paul Souter	Yonnie Starr	Jean-Louis Levesque	1:05.20
1977	Lucky Colonel S.	Gary Stahlbaum	Donnie Walker	Conn Smythe	1:05.40
1976	Pro Consul	Brian Swatuk	Brian Ottaway	Mrs. G. McCullough	1:05.00
