= Fatal Bullet =

American-bred Thoroughbred racehorse

- Sire: Red Bullet
- Grandsire: Unbridled
- Dam: Sararegal
- Damsire: Regal Classic
- Sex: Gelding
- Foaled: 2005
- Country: United States
- Colour: Bay
- Breeder: Adena Springs
- Owner: Bear Stables Ltd.
- Trainer: Reade Baker
- Record: 39: 12-5-8
- Earnings: $1,377,256

Major wins
- Bold Venture Stakes (2008, 2009); Tom Ridge Labor Day Stakes (2008); Kentucky Cup Sprint Stakes (2008); Hendrie Stakes (2008); Phoenix Stakes (2009)

Awards
- Canadian Champion Sprinter (2008); Canadian Horse of the Year (2008)

Fatal Bullet (foaled February 12, 2005 in Florida) is a Canadian Thoroughbred racehorse. A five-time stakes winner, he was crowned 2008 Canadian Horse of the Year and Champion Sprinter.

== Background and family ==
Bred in Florida by premier breeding farm Adena Springs, Fatal Bullet was sired by Red Bullet, the winner of the 2000 Preakness Stakes. The sire of other stakes horses such as Royal Currier, Cool Bullet, and Red Lead, his progeny have collectively earned more than $9.1 million. Fatal Bullet is out of the Regal Classic mare Sararegal, who has also produced stakes winning filly Millennia.

Fatal Bullet was purchased by Danny Dion's Bear Racing Stables for $27,000 at Adena Springs's 2007 Two-Year-Olds in Training sale.

== Racing career ==
=== 2007–2008: early career ===
During his racing career, Fatal Bullet was trained by Reade Baker who has also trained stakes winners Breaking Lucky, Bear Now, and Solid Appeal, among others.

Fatal Bullet ran his first six starts at Woodbine, winning his debut maiden and three allowances. He made his graded stakes debut in his third start, the 2007 Summer Stakes, finishing ninth.

Fatal Bullet's first start outside of Canada came in the Woody Stephens Stakes at Belmont Park in July 2008. He finished eighth in the race.

=== 2008: Horse of the Year ===
The gelding's first stakes win came next in the listed Bold Venture Stakes, where he set a new track record for 6.5 furlongs. Following his first big win were two more- the Tom Ridge Stakes at Presque Isle Downs and the Gr.III Kentucky Cup Sprint Stakes, a race in which he set another track record of 6.5 furlongs. In his final start of 2008, Fatal Bullet contested the 2008 Gr.I Breeders' Cup Sprint at Oak Tree. Fatal Bullet finished a valiant second to champion Midnight Lute, who came back from injury to win the race for the second time, in record time.

For his performances in 2008, Fatal Bullet was crowned the Sovereign Award for Canadian Champion Sprinter and Canadian Horse of the Year. Fatal Bullet also received three votes for American Champion Sprint Horse at the 2008 Eclipse Awards, with the winner being Benny the Bull.

=== 2009–2013: later career ===
Fatal Bullet's first start after the Breeders' Cup came next year in the 2009 Bold Venture Stakes, in a title defence. Fatal Bullet is one of six horses to win the Bold Venture Stakes twice. The final time, 1:14.90, was only 0.36 off Fatal Bullet's own stakes record, which Fatal Bullet had set the year before. In his next start, Fatal Bullet finished sixth in the Alfred G. Vanderbilt Handicap. The gelding's final stakes win came afterwards in the Gr.III Phoenix Stakes.

Fatal Bullet again contested the Breeders' Cup Sprint, this time finishing a poor sixth to winner Big Drama.

Fatal Bullet's later career consisted of several board-hitting performances in graded races, such as the Play the King Stakes, Nearctic Stakes, Kennedy Road Stakes, and Eclipse Stakes. His final win came in July 2016 in an allowance at Woodbine Racetrack.

Fatal Bullet has not raced since November 2013, when he finished 8th in the Kennedy Road Stakes. He has presumably been retired.
