= Lexie Lou =

Canadian Thoroughbred racehorse

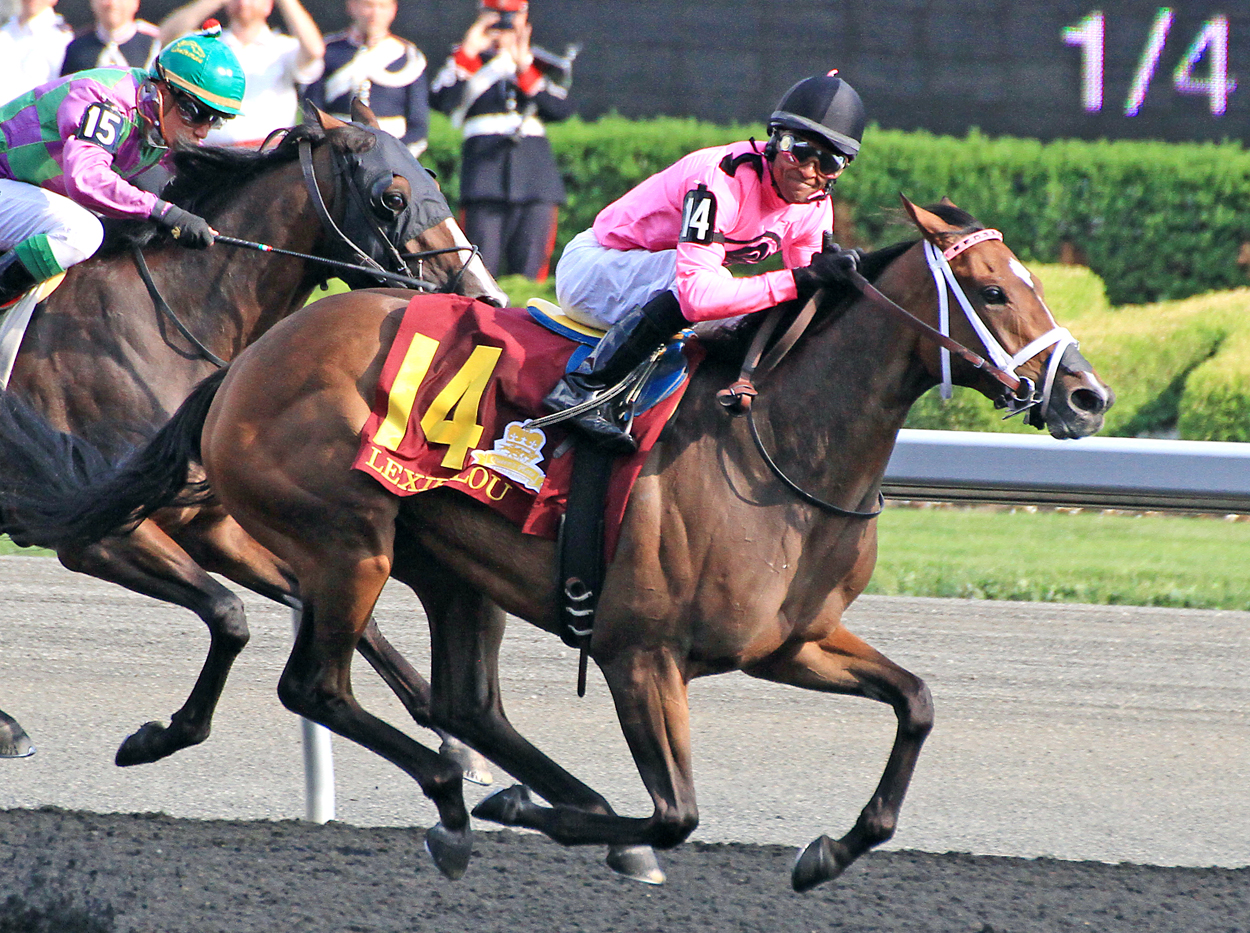
- Lexie Lou winning the 2014 Queen's Plate
- Sire: Sligo Bay
- Grandsire: Sadler's Wells
- Dam: Oneexcessivenite
- Damsire: In Excess
- Sex: Mare
- Foaled: February 26, 2011
- Country: Canada
- Colour: Bay
- Breeder: Paradox Farm
- Owner: John Ross (2013); Gary Barber
- Trainer: John Ross (2013); Mark Casse
- Record: 24: 10-4-4
- Earnings: US$1,763,538

Major wins
- South Ocean Stakes (2013); Autumn Miss Stakes (2014); Nassau Stakes (2016); Dance Smartly Stakes (2016); Victoriana Stakes 2016 Canadian Triple Crown wins: Queen's Plate (2014) Canadian Triple Tiara wins: Woodbine Oaks (2014); Wonder Where Stakes(2014)

Awards
- Canadian Horse of the Year (2014); Canadian Champion Three-Year-Old Filly (2014); Sovereign Award for Champion Female Turf Horse (2014, 2016)

Honours
- Canadian Horse Racing Hall of Fame (2019)
- Last updated on June 1, 2019

Lexie Lou (foaled February 26, 2011 in Ontario) is a Canadian Thoroughbred racehorse. In 2014, she won the Queen's Plate and two legs of the Canadian Triple Tiara on her way to winning three Sovereign Awards. She has also won three graded stakes in the United States and Canada, and finished second to American Horse of the Year California Chrome in the 2014 Hollywood Derby. In 2019, Lexie Lou was inducted into the Canadian Horse Racing Hall of Fame.

== Background ==
Lexie Lou was bred by Paradox Farm in Ontario. Her dam is Oneexcessivenite, a California bred mare who won 4 times in 18 starts, and whose three previous foals were all unraced. Lexie Lou's sire, Sligo Bay, is an Irish bred son of leading sire in Great Britain and Ireland Sadler's Wells and has been a moderate success at stud in Canada.

Lexie Lou was sold to John Ross for $5,577 at the 2012 Canadian Thoroughbred Horse Society yearling sale. Ross was her owner and trainer during her two-year-old campaign in 2013. She was sold after her first start of 2014 to Gary Barber, the chairman and CEO of Metro-Goldwyn-Mayer (MGM), for $300,000. She was then moved to the barn of Mark Casse, who at the time had already won six Sovereign Awards as outstanding trainer.

== Racing career ==
=== 2013: two-year-old season ===
In 2013, Lexie Lou raced eight times, all at Woodbine racetrack, in races for Canadian-bred fillies. She won three times and finished second twice. On August 28, she was awarded the Muskoka Stakes by disqualification after finishing second by a nose. She then finished second in both the Victorian Queen and Princess Elizabeth Stakes before winning the South Ocean Stakes by three lengths. She was the favorite for the Ontario Lassie Stakes on December 14 but finished third, a neck and a nose behind the first two filles.

=== 2014: three-year-old season ===
Lexie Lou started her three-year-old season by finishing fourth in the Star Shoot Stakes. Watching her that day was Barber, who was so impressed by the way she kept running after the finish line that he asked Casse to buy her. Racing for her new connections, Lexie Lou entered the 7-furlong Fury Stakes on May 10 as the favorite. She made a strong move going three wide around the far turn, but could not quite catch the front-runners and finished third by just over half a length.

On June 15, Lexie Lou stamped herself as one of the best three-year-old fillies in Canada by winning the Woodbine Oaks by 4 1/2 lengths. Her time of 1:49.77 for 1 1/8 miles was a full second faster than the colts had run earlier that day in the Plate Trial, the major prep race for the Queen's Plate. It was her first time racing without blinkers, a change that helped her relax during the race.

The Woodbine Oaks is the first leg of the Canadian Triple Tiara for three-year-old Canadian-bred fillies. Rather than race in the second leg of the Tiara, the Bison City Stakes, Lexie Lou's connections decided to race her against the colts in the CDN$1 million Queen's Plate. Later, she would bypass the second leg of the Canadian Triple Crown, the Prince of Wales Stakes, to enter the third leg of the Canadian Triple Tiara, the Wonder Where Stakes. The scheduling options meant she did not have a chance to win either the Crown or Tiara, though she would go on to win three Canadian classics that year.

For the Queen's Plate on July 6, Lexie Lou was the lone filly in a field of 15 and was made the 3-1 second choice by the bettors. Lexie Lou broke from post position 14 and settled towards the back of the pack for the first half mile. She then started to make up ground down the backstretch, moved to second around the far turn and hit the front heading into the stretch. She then held off Ami's Holiday to win by 1 1/2 lengths, becoming the sixth filly to complete the Oaks/Plate double.

It was the first Queen's Plate win for trainer Casse and the second for jockey Patrick Husbands, who became convinced the filly would win after he breezed her the day before the race.

On August 10, Lexie Lou made her first start on the turf in the Wonder Where Stakes for Canadian-bred fillies. After breaking well, she saved ground while rating in fourth behind a moderate pace. Exiting the final turn, she had several lengths to make up on the leader but responded to urging from Husbands to win commandingly.

In the Canadian Stakes on September 14, Lexie Lou faced older fillies and mares for the first time. It was also her first time in an unrestricted stakes race. On a turf course labeled good, she raced close to the lead for the first half mile but then faded to last.

On October 25, Lexie Lou traveled to Santa Anita Park for her first start outside Canada in the Grade III Autumn Miss Stakes. Her connections felt that she would be helped by the firmer turf in California compared to the conditions at Woodbine in the Canadian Stakes. Now ridden by Corey Nakatani, she made a powerful run down the stretch to win by 1 1/4 lengths in a good time of 1:33.70 for one mile. It was her first graded stakes victory.

On November 29, Lexie Lou stepped up in class by entering the Grade I Hollywood Derby at Del Mar. After racing in the middle of the pack for much of the race, she moved to the outside in the stretch and started to close rapidly. She finished second, just two lengths behind eventual American Horse of the Year California Chrome, who had earlier won that year's Kentucky Derby and Preakness Stakes. Nakatani said, "You've got to tip your cap to the winner. He's a heckuva horse. But my filly is a real runner. She fired it up today."

Lexie Lou was named the 2014 Canadian Horse of the Year, as well as winning Sovereign Awards as champion three-year-old filly and champion turf mare. Casse would also win another Sovereign Award for outstanding trainer.

=== 2015: four-year-old season ===
On January 17, Lexie Lou debuted as a four-year-old in the La Canada Stakes at Santa Anita Park as the even money favorite. It was her first race on a natural dirt surface: previously she had raced on either turf or Woodbine's all weather Polytrack surface. She broke well but reacted poorly when another horse sprinted in front of her for the early lead, causing dirt to be kicked in her face. She rallied late though to finish second. Jockey Corey Nakatani thought it was a promising performance, and that she would improve with longer distances.

After competing in nine stakes races in nine months, Lexie Lou was given some time off, then resumed training for an August return to the track. Shortly before her scheduled race on August 26, she injured her eye and had to be scratched.

=== 2016: five-year-old season ===
Lexie Lou finally returned to the racetrack on January 13 in an Allowance Optional Claiming race at Tampa Bay, finishing third. She then finished a disappointing sixth in the Grade III South Endeavour Stakes, also at Tampa Bay, then finished third in another allowance optional claimer, this time at Woodbine.

On May 29, Lexie Lou returned to form in the Grade II Nassau Stakes at one mile on the turf. Sent off at odds of 12-1, she rated off the pace in third, then outkicked Mississippi Delta in the stretch to win by 3/4 length. In her first victory since October 2014, the time was an excellent 1:32.98. "She's a funny filly," said Husbands. "You've got to play with her mind. You've got to let her do what she wants to do. Last time when I rode her, nobody wanted the lead, and she took the lead and quit. She's happy to be back home. She's a nice filly. She's a little champion."

On June 11, she shipped to Belmont Park for the Grade I Just A Game Stakes. She raced wide just off a quick pace, but could not keep up when asked for run in the stretch. She finished tenth, but just 7 1/4 lengths behind the winner, Celestine, who completed the mile in an exceptional 1:31.64.

On July 3, Lexie Lou entered the Grade II Dance Smartly Stakes at Woodbine as the second betting choice. She went to the early lead and opened up a three length lead going into far turn. When they entered the stretch, she appeared to be fading as her lead shrank to only one length, but she rallied in the final furlong to win by 1 1/4 lengths. She completed the race of "about" 1 1/8 miles in 1:44.89.

On July 30, Lexie Lou won the Victoriana Stakes in wire-to-wire fashion. It would prove her final start as she did not come out of the race showing her normal behaviour. "She owes us nothing," Casse said. "She’s a great filly. I was reflecting upon her today and thinking she’s probably one of the best horses I’ve ever trained. Not too many horses can do what she did in overcoming a year layoff. She could run on the turf, she could run on the synthetic, and the one time I ran her on the dirt, she ran pretty good. She’s just a remarkable filly that I’ll always remember."

Lexie Lou received the 2016 Sovereign Award for Champion Turf Female Horse.

== Retirement ==
Lexie Lou was entered in the 2016 Keeneland November Sale as a prospective broodmare. She sold for $1 million to KI Farm owned by Tomoyuki Nakamura. She was bred to Frankel in 2017 before being sent to Japan. In Japan, she foaled Danon Scorpion, the winner of the 2022 NHK Mile Cup, as well as Garavogue, who placed second in the Oka Shō and Shūka Shō in 2026.

Lexie Lou was named into the Canadian Horse Racing Hall of Fame in 2019.

== Pedigree ==
Pedigree of Lexie Lou (ON), bay mare, 2011
Sire Sligo Bay (IRE) 1998	Sadler's Wells; 1981	Northern Dancer	Nearctic
Sire Sligo Bay (IRE) 1998	Sadler's Wells; 1981	Northern Dancer	Natalma
Sire Sligo Bay (IRE) 1998	Sadler's Wells; 1981	Fairy Bridge	Bold Reason
Sire Sligo Bay (IRE) 1998	Sadler's Wells; 1981	Fairy Bridge	Special
Sire Sligo Bay (IRE) 1998	Angelic Song; 1988	Halo	Hail to Reason
Sire Sligo Bay (IRE) 1998	Angelic Song; 1988	Halo	Cosmah
Sire Sligo Bay (IRE) 1998	Angelic Song; 1988	Ballade	Herbager
Sire Sligo Bay (IRE) 1998	Angelic Song; 1988	Ballade	Miss Swapsco
Dam Oneexcessivenight 2000	In Excess (IRE); 1987	Siberian Express	Caro (IRE)
Dam Oneexcessivenight 2000	In Excess (IRE); 1987	Siberian Express	Indian Call
Dam Oneexcessivenight 2000	In Excess (IRE); 1987	Kantado	Saulingo (GB)
Dam Oneexcessivenight 2000	In Excess (IRE); 1987	Kantado	Vi
Dam Oneexcessivenight 2000	Favored One; 1992	Son of Briarctic	Briarctic
Dam Oneexcessivenight 2000	Favored One; 1992	Son of Briarctic	Taboola
Dam Oneexcessivenight 2000	Favored One; 1992	Highly Favored	Favorecidian
Dam Oneexcessivenight 2000	Favored One; 1992	Highly Favored	Minie Ball (family: 9-f)

Lexie Lou is inbred 4S × 5D to Nearctic, meaning Nearctic appears once in the fourth generation of the sire's side of Lexie's Lou's pedigree and once in the fifth generation of the dam's side. She is also inbred 4S x 5S to Hail to Reason, and 5S x 5S to Almahmoud
