= Exhi =

American-bred Thoroughbred racehorse

- Sire: Maria's Mon
- Grandsire: Wavering Monarch
- Dam: Soldera
- Damsire: Polish Numbers
- Sex: Colt
- Foaled: 2007
- Country: United States
- Colour: Bay
- Breeder: Wertheimer et Frère
- Owner: Wertheimer et Frère
- Trainer: Todd Pletcher
- Record: 14: 6-4-1
- Earnings: $800,382

Major wins
- Lexington Stakes (2010); Rushaway Stakes (2010); Victoria Park Stakes (2010); Ben Ali Stakes (2011)
- Last updated on April 24, 2011

Exhi (foaled 2007) was sired by Maria's Mon, and his dam was the Group 2-placed stakes winner Soldera (Polish Numbers). He is a homebred for Wertheimer et Frère and trained by Todd Pletcher.

Exhi broke his maiden on turf at Belmont Park, in his third career start of his two-year-old season.

In his three-year-old season he made a splash giving his trainer his third straight Lexington Stakes on April 17. In his prior start, Exhi gave Pin Oak sires a 1-2 finish in the $100,000 Rushaway Stakes, when he (by Maria's Mon) stubbornly held off Lonesome Street (by Broken Vow) on March 27 at Turfway Park.

To date, Exhi's total earnings are $284,198 and he has been in the money 6 of 8 starts.
