= Mike Fox (horse) =

Canadian-bred Thoroughbred racehorse

- Sire: Giant's Causeway
- Grandsire: Storm Cat
- Dam: Alexis
- Damsire: Alzao
- Sex: Stallion
- Foaled: 2004
- Country: Canada
- Colour: Bay
- Breeder: Firestone Farm
- Owner: D. Morgan Firestone
- Trainer: Ian Black
- Record: 10: 4-0-1
- Earnings: $734,020

Major wins
- Queen's Plate (2007)

Mike Fox (foaled 2004 in Caledon, Ontario) was a Canadian Thoroughbred racehorse best known as the upset winner of Canada's most prestigious race, the Queen's Plate, in 2007. He would die on Jan. 13 2007

In winning the Queen's Plate aboard Mike Fox, jockey Emma-Jayne Wilson became the first female rider to ever win the race in its 148 runnings.

== Pedigree ==
Pedigree of Mike Fox, bay stallion, 2004
| Sire Giant's Causeway | Storm Cat | Storm Bird | Northern Dancer |
| Sire Giant's Causeway | Storm Cat | Storm Bird | South Ocean |
| Sire Giant's Causeway | Storm Cat | Terlingua | Secretariat |
| Sire Giant's Causeway | Storm Cat | Terlingua | Crimson Saint |
| Sire Giant's Causeway | Mariah's Storm | Rahy | Blushing Groom |
| Sire Giant's Causeway | Mariah's Storm | Rahy | Glorious Song |
| Sire Giant's Causeway | Mariah's Storm | Immense | Roberto |
| Sire Giant's Causeway | Mariah's Storm | Immense | Imsodear |
| Dam Alexis | Alzao | Lyphard | Northern Dancer |
| Dam Alexis | Alzao | Lyphard | Goofed |
| Dam Alexis | Alzao | Lady Rebecca | Sir Ivor |
| Dam Alexis | Alzao | Lady Rebecca | Pocahontas |
| Dam Alexis | Sister Golden Hair | Glint of Gold | Mill Reef |
| Dam Alexis | Sister Golden Hair | Glint of Gold | Crown Treasure |
| Dam Alexis | Sister Golden Hair | Rain Again | Relko |
| Dam Alexis | Sister Golden Hair | Rain Again | Collateral (family: 19) |
