= South Ocean Stakes =

- Class: Restricted stakes
- Location: Woodbine Racetrack; Toronto, Ontario, Canada
- Inaugurated: 1997
- Race type: Thoroughbred - Flat racing
- Website: woodbine.com

Race information
- Distance: 11/16
- Surface: Tapeta synthetic dirt
- Track: left-handed
- Qualification: Four-year-olds and up
- Purse: $100,000

The South Ocean Stakes is a Canadian Thoroughbred horse race held annually at Woodbine Racetrack in Toronto, Ontario. A race for two-year-old fillies on Tapeta synthetic dirt over a distance of a mile and a sixteen, it offers a purse of $100,000. Part of the Ontario Sire Stakes program, it is restricted to horses sired by a stallion certified as standing in the Province of Ontario.

From the first running in 1997 through 2005, the race was contested on natural dirt. In 2006 the synthetic racing surface known as Polytrack was installed and used until 2016 when it was replaced with the current Tapeta synthetic racing surface.

== Race name ==
The stakes was named for the racemare South Ocean, a multiple stakes winner bred by E. P. Taylor at his Windfields Farm in Ontario. Bred to super-sire and sire of sires Northern Dancer, South Ocean was the dam of the Champion runner and important sire Storm Bird. Again with Northern Dancer, South Ocean produced Northernette, a Canadian Champion at age two and three and a Canadian Horse Racing Hall of Fame inductee who herself became an influential broodmare.

== Records ==
Speed record:

- 1:44.70 @ 11/16 miles: Lexie Lou (2013)

Most wins by a jockey:

- 2 - Todd Kabel (2002, 2004)
- 2 - Eurico Rosa Da Silva (2008, 2016)
- 2 - Steve Bahen (2011, 2012)

Most wins by a trainer:

- 3 - Mark Casse (2009, 2014, 2018)

Most wins by an owner:

- As at 2019, no owner has won this race more than once.

== Winners ==
Year	Winner	Age	Jockey	Trainer	Owner	Dist. (Miles)	Time	Win$
2019	Gun Society	2	Kazushi Kimura	Roger Attfield	Roger Attfield	11/16	1:45.34	$60,000
2018	Preferred Guest	2	Jerome Lermyte	Mark Casse	G. G. Racing Stable	11/16	1:46.10	$60,000
2017	Line of Vision	2	Luis Contreras	Andrew Smith	Joey Gee Thoroughbreds (Joe Guerrieri)	11/16	1:45.55	$75,000
2016	Cindervella	2	Eurico Rosa Da Silva	Michael P. DePaulo	Frank Annecchini & D'Alimonte Holdings	11/16	1:44.81	$75,000
2015	Trini Brewnette	2	Alan Garcia	Daniel Vella	Derek Chin	11/16	1:47.00	$75,000
2014	Galina Point	2	Patrick Husbands	Mark Casse	Gary Barber	11/16	1:47.35	$75,000
2013	Lexie Lou	2	Gary Boulanger	John A. Ross	J.R. Racing Stable Inc.	11/16	1:44.70	$75,000
2012	Nipissing	2	Steve Bahen	Rachel Halden	Chiefswood Stable (Robert & Mark Krembil)	11/16	1:45.79	$75,000
2011	Grace Phil	2	Steve Bahen	Robert Tiller	Hoof Hearted Stables	11/16	1:46.48	$75,000
2010	Isabella Bay	2	Chantal Sutherland	Ian Howard	Donald, Gretchen & Felicia Ross & Frances White	11/16	1:45.69	$75,000
2009	Attitude Included	2	Corey Fraser	Mark Casse	Quintessential Racing	11/16	1:46.75	$75,000
2008	Double Malt	2	Eurico Rosa Da Silva	Malcolm Pierce	Mike Ambler & Partners	11/16	1:44.77	$75,000
2007	Krz Exec	2	Jerry Baird	Michael P. DePaulo	Sylon Stable & Partner	11/16	1:46.52	$75,000
2006	Moon Path	2	Emma-Jayne Wilson	Mark Frostad	Sam-Son Farm	11/16	1:49.00	$75,000
2005	La Gran Marylin	2	Slade Callaghan	Hugo S. Taft	Fieldstone Farms (Ron Delmas & family)	11/16	1:48.64	$75,000
2004	Coastal Fortress	2	Todd Kabel	Barbara Minshall	Minshall Farms	11/16	1:48.89	$80,700
2003	My Vintage Port	2	Jono Jones	Kenneth B. Parsley	K. Parsley & R. Pettifer	11/16	1:47.35	$79,875
2002	Santerra	2	Todd Kabel	Michael Mattine	Ted Burnett	11/16	1:47.23	$79,575
2001	Galadriel	2	David Clark	Roger Attfield	Kinghaven Farms	11/16	1:46.45	$62,400
2000	Classical Romance	2	Na Somsanith	John Cardella	California Stable	11/16	1:46.77	$64,200
1999	Inspired Kiss	2	Neil Poznansky	Thomas O'Keefe	Caroga Stables & Wings Of Erin Farm	11/16	1:47.60	$32,100
1998	Ring Star	2	Sean Mario Giblin	Brian Ottaway	M. Stable	11/16	1:49.20	$22,050
1997	Pompeii Hollow	2	Kelly A. MacKay	Beverly Buck	Beverly Buck	11/16	1:47.40	$22,680
