= Kentucky Cup Sprint Stakes =

Kentucky Cup Sprint
- Class: Grade III
- Location: Turfway Park; Florence, Kentucky, United States
- Inaugurated: 1994
- Race type: Thoroughbred – Flat racing
- Website: www.turfway.com

Race information
- Distance: 6 furlong Sprint
- Surface: Polytrack
- Track: left-handed
- Qualification: Three-year-olds
- Weight: Assigned
- Purse: $100,000

The Kentucky Cup Sprint Stakes is an American Thoroughbred horse race run annually since 1994 at Turfway Park in Florence, Kentucky. Contested over a distance of six furlongs on Polytrack synthetic dirt, the Grade III event is open to three-year-old horses.

Contested in late September, previous winners Reraise and Cajun Beat went on to win the Breeders' Cup Sprint.

With the support of WinStar Farm, this race which was suspended in 2010 due to economic challenges, will return in 2011.

== Records ==
Speed record

- 1:08.03 – Fatal Bullet (2008)

Most wins by a jockey

- 3 – Pat Day (1997, 2001, 2002)

Most wins by a trainer

- 3 – D. Wayne Lukas (1997, 2001, 2002)

Most wins by an owner

- 2 – Overbrook Farm (2001, 2002)

== Winners Stakes ==
Year	Winner	Jockey	Trainer	Owner	Time
2011	Matthewburg	Victor Lebron	Mike Maker	Tom & Matt Conway	1:10.28
2010	No Race				
2009	El Brujo	Garrett Gomez	Malcolm Pierce	Windways Farm	1:09.04
2008	Fatal Bullet	Eurico Rosa Da Silva	Reade Baker	Bear Stables	1:08.03
2007	Piratesonthelake	Diego Sanchez	James DiVito	B Jock Racing LLC	1:09.09
2006	Reigning Court	Corey Lanerie	Scott Blasi	Brenda & Philip Robertson	1:09.13
2005	Estate Collection	Patrick Valenzuela	Doug O'Neill	Suarez Racing Inc.	1:09.75
2004	Level Playingfield	John McKee	Robert E. Holthus	Fly Racing LLC	1:09.78
2003	Cajun Beat	Cornelio Velásquez	Steve Margolis	S. Sanan/J. & J. Iracane	1:09.54
2002	Day Trader	Pat Day	D. Wayne Lukas	Overbrook Farm	1:10.01
2001	Snow Ridge	Pat Day	D. Wayne Lukas	Overbrook Farm	1:09.22
2000	Caller One	Kent Desormeaux	James K. Chapman	C. Chapman & T. McArthur	1:09.46
1999	Successful Appeal	Edgar Prado	John C. Kimmel	Starview Stable	1:09.42
1998	Reraise	Corey Nakatani	Craig Dollase	B Fey/M Han et al.	1:08.50
1997	Partner's Hero	Pat Day	D. Wayne Lukas	Horton Stable Inc.	1:09.02
1996	Appealing Skier	Mike E. Smith	Ben Perkins Sr.	New Farm	1:08.24
1995	Lord Carson	Mike E. Smith	D. Wayne Lukas	David P. Reynolds	1:08.60
1994	End Sweep	Chris McCarron	Mark E. Casse	Harry T. Mangurian Jr.	1:09.99
