= David Cotey =

Canadian Thoroughbred racehorse trainer

Personal information
- Born: February 18, 1948 (age 78) Toronto, Ontario, Canada
- Occupation: Trainer

Horse racing career
- Sport: Horse racing
- Career wins: 273+ (ongoing)

Major racing wins
- Manitoba Derby (2001); Mazarine Breeders' Cup Stakes (2001); Sky Classic Stakes (2001); Canadian Derby (2002); Maple Leaf Stakes (2002); Victoria Park Stakes (2003); Clarendon Stakes (2003); Vandal Stakes (2003); Display Stakes (2004); La Lorgnette Stakes (2007); Silver Deputy Stakes (2008); Swynford Stakes (2008); Grey Stakes (2008)

Significant horses
- Lady Shari, Mine That Bird

David Cotey (born February 18, 1948) is a Canadian Thoroughbred racehorse trainer. Near the beginning of the 1990s, he formed the nom de course Dominion Bloodstock to purchase and race Thoroughbreds with partners Hugh Galbraith and Derek Ball. In 2001, he began his training career, earning his first win on May 25 then a few months later the Manitoba Derby at Assiniboia Downs in Winnipeg, Manitoba. In 2002, he won the Canadian Derby at Northlands Park in Edmonton, Alberta. Cotey was born in Toronto, Ontario, Canada.

== Mine That Bird ==
In 2008, Cotey conditioned his second Sovereign Award winner, a horse named Mine That Bird he purchased for $9,500.(His first being Lady Shari who won the Top Three Year Old Filly category in 2002.) Raced as a partnership with two other investors, while maintaining a half-interest for himself, Cotey conditioned the gelding for racing. At age two, Mine That Bird raced at Woodbine Racetrack in Toronto where he won four of six starts. Jockey Chantal Sutherland rode him to victory in the Silver Deputy Stakes and the Swynford Stakes then, after she and the horse won the Grey Stakes on October 11, 2008, Cotey and his partners accepted a $400,000 offer from the New Mexico partnership of Double Eagle Ranch and Bueno Suerte Equine. Mine That Bird was subsequently voted the 2008 Canadian Champion 2-yr-old Male Horse.

David Cotey had believed in Mine That Bird so much that he nominated him for the Breeders' Cup Juvenile and the Kentucky Derby. For his new owners, on May 2, 2009, Mine That Bird won the United States' most prestigious race, the Kentucky Derby. In the post race ceremony, winning trainer Chip Woolley said: "A guy named Dave Cotey in Canada is the guy who really qualified this horse to be here. He deserves a lot of the credit and deserves to be here."
