= Cajun Beat =

American Thoroughbred racehorse

- Sire: Grand Slam
- Grandsire: Gone West
- Dam: Beckys Shirt
- Damsire: Cure the Blues
- Sex: Gelding
- Foaled: March 26, 2000
- Died: January 18, 2020 (aged 19)
- Country: United States
- Colour: Dark Bay/Brown
- Breeder: John T. L. Jones Jr. & H. Smoot Fahlgren
- Owner: Padua Stables & John & Joseph Iracane
- Trainer: Stephen R. Margolis
- Record: 19: 7-3-0
- Earnings: US$1,159,100

Major wins
- Kentucky Cup Sprint Stakes (2003); Hallandale Beach Stakes (2003); Hollywood Turf Express Handicap (2004); Mr. Prospector Handicap (2004); Breeders' Cup wins: Breeders' Cup Sprint (2003)

Cajun Beat (March 26, 2000 – January 18, 2020) was an American Thoroughbred racehorse best known for winning the 2003 Breeders' Cup Sprint at 25–1. Owned by Padua Stables and John & Joseph Iracane, Cajun Beat retired from racing in April 2005 having won seven of nineteen starts and with earnings of $1,159,100.

== Pedigree ==
Pedigree of Cajun Beat, 2000
Sire Grand Slam (USA) 2006	Gone West (USA); 2000	Mr Prospector	Raise a Native
Sire Grand Slam (USA) 2006	Gone West (USA); 2000	Mr Prospector	Gold Digger
Sire Grand Slam (USA) 2006	Gone West (USA); 2000	Secrettame	Secretariat
Sire Grand Slam (USA) 2006	Gone West (USA); 2000	Secrettame	Tamerett
Sire Grand Slam (USA) 2006	Bright Candles (USA); 1994	El Gran Senor	Northern Dancer
Sire Grand Slam (USA) 2006	Bright Candles (USA); 1994	El Gran Senor	Sex Appeal
Sire Grand Slam (USA) 2006	Bright Candles (USA); 1994	Christmas Bonus	Key to the Mint
Sire Grand Slam (USA) 2006	Bright Candles (USA); 1994	Christmas Bonus	Sugar Plum Time
Dam Beckys Shirt (CAN) 2006	Cure The Blues (USA); 1999	Stop The Music	Hail to Reason
Dam Beckys Shirt (CAN) 2006	Cure The Blues (USA); 1999	Stop The Music	Bebopper
Dam Beckys Shirt (CAN) 2006	Cure The Blues (USA); 1999	Quick Cure	Dr Fager
Dam Beckys Shirt (CAN) 2006	Cure The Blues (USA); 1999	Quick Cure	Speedwell
Dam Beckys Shirt (CAN) 2006	Thundertee (USA); 1993	Ye	Turn-to
Dam Beckys Shirt (CAN) 2006	Thundertee (USA); 1993	Ye	Ye-cats
Dam Beckys Shirt (CAN) 2006	Thundertee (USA); 1993	Hepzibah	Count Amber
Dam Beckys Shirt (CAN) 2006	Thundertee (USA); 1993	Hepzibah	Fullopep
