= Hill 'n' Dale Stakes =

- Class: Ungraded Stakes
- Location: Woodbine Racetrack; Toronto, Ontario
- Inaugurated: 2004
- Race type: Thoroughbred – Flat racing
- Website: www.woodbineentertainment.com/qct/default.asp

Race information
- Distance: 1 1/16 miles (8.5 furlongs)
- Surface: Polytrack
- Track: left-handed
- Qualification: Fillies & Mares, 3-years-old & up
- Weight: Assigned
- Purse: $100,000 plus stallion season

The Hill 'n' Dale Stakes is a Thoroughbred horse race run annually since 2004 at Woodbine Racetrack in Toronto, Ontario, Canada. Held in mid June, the ungraded stakes race is open to fillies & mares, age three and older. It is raced over a distance of 1 1/16 miles on Polytrack synthetic dirt.

The event currently offers a purse of $100,000 plus her owners receive a choice of three stallion services, courtesy of Hill 'n' Dale Farms in Lexington, Kentucky owned by Canadian John G. Sikura. The race winner gets first choice, then the runner-up chooses from the remaining two, leaving the final stallion's services for the third-place finisher.

This race appears to be discontinued as of 2010.

== Records ==
Speed record:

- 1:43.63 My Lordship (2004)

Most wins:

- No horse has won this race more than once.

Most wins by an owner:

- 2 – Live Oak Plantation (2004, 2005)

Most wins by a jockey:

- 3 – Todd Kabel (2004, 2005, 2006)

Most wins by a trainer:

- 2 – Malcolm Pierce (2004, 2005)

== Winners of the Hill 'n' Dale Stakes ==
Year	Winner	Age	Jockey	Trainer	Owner	Time
2010	Tasty Temptation	4	Patrick Husbands	Mark Casse	Woodford Racing	1:43.93
2009	Smart Surprise	5	Patrick Husbands	Josie Carroll	Hill 'n' Dale Equine Holdings	1:43.30
2008	Bear Now	4	Jerry Baird	Reade Baker	Bear Stables Ltd.	1:43.49
2007	Bear Now	3	Emile Ramsammy	Reade Baker	Bear Stables Ltd.	1:43.78
2006	Flaming Heart	5	Todd Kabel	Brian A. Lynch	Stronach Stables	1:44.45
2005	Lemon Maid	3	Todd Kabel	Malcolm Pierce	Live Oak Plantation	1:47.81
2004	My Lordship	3	Todd Kabel	Malcolm Pierce	Live Oak Plantation	1:43.63
