= Bold Venture Stakes =

Bold Venture stakes
- Class: Grade III
- Location: Woodbine Racetrack; Toronto, Ontario, Canada
- Inaugurated: 1956
- Race type: Thoroughbred - Flat racing
- Website: www.woodbineentertainment.com/qct/default.asp

Race information
- Distance: 6.5 furlongs
- Surface: Tapeta all weather
- Track: left-handed
- Qualification: Three-year-olds and up
- Weight: Weight-For-Age
- Purse: CAN$125,000

The Bold Venture Stakes is a Thoroughbred horse race run annually at Woodbine Racetrack in Toronto, Ontario, Canada. Open to horses age three and older, it is contested during the second half of July on Tapeta synthetic dirt over a distance of six and a half furlongs. Currently the race offers a purse of CAN$125,000.

== History ==
Inaugurated in 1956 at the Fort Erie Racetrack, the race was named in honor of Bold Venture, winner of the 1936 Kentucky Derby and Preakness Stakes.

This race was upgraded to a Grade III event in 2012.

Fatal Bullet set a new track record time for the 6 1/2 furlong distance of 1:14.54 when winning the 2008 renewal.

== Winners ==
Year	Winner	Age	Jockey	Trainer	Owner	Time
2026	Souped Up	6	Emma-Jayne Wilson	Ronald H. Sadler	Linda J Theil and Harri Hosein	1:17.06
2025	Simcoe	5	Rafael Manuel Hernandez	Katerina Vassilieva	Chiefswood Stables Limited	1:15.42
2024	Patches O'Houlihan	4	Sofia Vives	Robert P. Tiller	Frank D. Di Giulio Jr.	1:14.90
2023	Patches O'Houlihan	3	Daisuke Fukumoto	Robert P. Tiller	Frank D. Di Giulio Jr.	1:15.34
2022	Secret Reserve	4	Eswan Flores	Michael Mattine	Carlo D'Amato and Stacey Van Camp	1:16.19
2021	Pink Lloyd	9	Rafael Manuel Hernandez	Robert Tiller	Entourage Stable	1:15.13
2020	Pink Lloyd	8	Rafael Manuel Hernandez	Robert Tiller	Entourage Stable	1:16.03
2019	Yorkton	5	Patrick Husbands	Stuart Simon	Chiefswood Stable	1:14.96
2018	Yorkton	4	Jesse Campbell	Stuart Simon	Chiefswood Stable	1:15.05
2017	Ikerrin Road	4	David Moran	Vito Armata	Alpine Stable	1:15.40
2016	Puntrooskie	5	Patrick Husbands	Donald MacRae	Lay, Loughry and D Mac Racing Stable	1:16.06
2015	Stacked Deck	4	Luis Saez	Barbara J. Minshall	Bruce Lunsford	1:14.75
2014	Calgary Cat	4	Eurico Rosa Da Silva	Kevin Attard	Chesney/Hoffman	1:14.91
2013	Essence Hit Man	6	Jesse M. Campbell	Larry Cappuccitti	A & G Racing	1:15.46
2012	Essence Hit Man	5	Jesse M. Campbell	Audre Cappuccitti	Cappuccitti/Audre/Gordon	1:15.82
2011	Hollywood Hit	5	James McAleney	Terry Jordan	Peter Redekop B C., Ltd.	1:14.76
2010	Smokey Fire	5	Emma-Jayne Wilson	Sid C. Attard	Jim Dandy Stable	1:15.78
2009	Fatal Bullet	4	Eurico Rosa da Silva	Reade Baker	Bear Stables	1:14.90
2008	Fatal Bullet	3	Eurico Rosa da Silva	Reade Baker	Bear Stables	1:14.54
2007	Gangster	6	Todd Kabel	Sid C. Attard	Goldmart Farms	1:16.02

== Earlier winners ==
- 2006 - Are You Serious (1:29.81; 7.5 furlongs)
- 2005 - Judiths Wild Rush (1:15.41)
- 2004 - I'm the Tiger (1:15.69)
- 2003 - Milligan the Great (1:16.77)
- 2002 - Sambuca on Ice (1:16.06)
- 2001 - Tempered Appeal (1:16.05)
- 2000 - One Way Love (1:16.35)
- 1999 - One Way Love (1:16.74)
- 1998 - Deputy Inxs (1:15.60)
- 1997 - Parisianprospector (1:17.00)
- 1996 - Parental Pressure (1:17.60)
- 1995 - Sea Wall (1:17.40)
- 1994 - Premier Explosion (1:15.60)
- 1993 - Megas Vukefalos (1:18.60)
- 1992 - Canadian Silver (1:17.00)
- 1991 - Key Spirit (1:17.60)
- 1990 - Woden (1:17.80)
- 1989 - Overpeer (1:18.20)
- 1988 - Jamaican Gigolo (1:18.80)
- 1987 - Jamaican Gigolo (1:19.60)
- 1986 - S S Enterprise (1:19.00)
- 1985 - Aeronotic (1:17.60)
- 1984 - Nancy's Champion (1:20.40)
- 1983 - Play the Hornpipe (1:19.80)
- 1982 - Frost King (1:20.20)
- 1981 - Impressive Prince (1:19.00)
- 1980 - Royal Sparkle (1:21.60)
- 1979 - Stutz Bearcat (1:20.40)
- 1978 - Instead of Roses (1:20.20)
- 1977 - Pres de Tu (1:18.40)
- 1976 - Royal Chocolate (1:25.00; 7 furlongs)
- 1975 - Frohlich (1:10.20; 6 furlongs)
- 1974 - Queen's Splendour (1:10.60)
- 1973 - Dawes Road (1:12.60)
- 1972 - Briartic (1:09.40)
- 1971 - Coup Landing (1:11.40)
- 1970 - Perfect Tan (1:13.00)
- 1969 - Melindroso (1:10.80)
- 1968 - Lane (1:11.20)
- 1967 - One Sunday (1:10.40; 6.5 furlongs)
- 1966 - Bright Object (1:10.00)
- 1965 - Lebon M L (1:12.00)
- 1964 - Vindent de Paul (1:10.80)
- 1963 - First Minister (1:13.60)
- 1962 - First Minister (1:11.20)
- 1961 - Reactor (1:08.20; 5 furlongs)
- 1960 - War Eagle (1:04.80)
- 1959 - Riz (0:59.00)
- 1958 - Nearctic (0:58.20)
- 1957 - Pot Hunter (1:01.00)
- 1956 - Navy Page (1:00.40) INAUGURAL RUNNING

== See also ==
- List of Canadian flat horse races
