= Emma-Jayne Wilson =

Canadian jockey

Personal information
- Born: September 1, 1981 (age 44) Brampton, Ontario, Canada
- Occupation: Jockey

Horse racing career
- Sport: Horse racing
- Career wins: 1,900 (ongoing)

Major racing wins
- Canadian Stakes (2005); Ontario Lassie Stakes (2005, 2014, 2015); Alywow Stakes (2006); Ontario Matron Stakes (2006); Durham Cup Stakes (2006, 2011, 2015); South Ocean Stakes (2006); Valedictory Stakes (2006, 2012, 2014, 2016); Maple Leaf Stakes (2006, 2007, 2008); Victoria Stakes (2007); Vigil Stakes (2007); Jacques Cartier Stakes (2007); Seagram Cup Stakes (2008); Fanfreluche Stakes (2008, 2011); Glorious Song Stakes (2008); Victoria Park Stakes (2008, 2011); Woodstock Stakes (2008, 2009, 2015); Victoriana Stakes (2009); Ontario Colleen Stakes (2009); Kennedy Road Stakes (2009, 2013); Bold Venture Stakes (2010); Bison City Stakes (2010, 2015); Eclipse Stakes (Canada) (2010, 2012); Pan American Stakes (2011); Nijinsky Stakes (2011, 2013); Dominion Day Stakes (2012); Bessarabian Stakes (2012); Natalma Stakes (2013); Display Stakes (2013, 2015); Northern Dancer Turf Stakes (2015, 2020); Sky Classic Stakes (2015); Duchess Stakes (2016); Shergar Cup (2015); Shergar Cup Mile (2022); Canadian Classic Race wins: Queen's Plate (2007)

Racing awards
- United States Champion Apprentice Jockey (2005); Canadian Champion Apprentice Jockey (2005, 2006); Avelino Gomez Memorial Award (2018)

Significant horses
- Arravale, Classic Stamp, Mike Fox, Rahy's Attorney
- Updated on June 24, 2007

Emma-Jayne Wilson (born September 1, 1981) is a Sovereign and Eclipse Award-winning jockey in Thoroughbred horse racing. She began taking riding lessons at age nine, and after finishing high school in Brampton, she studied equine management at Kemptville College, part of the University of Guelph.

In 2007 aboard Mike Fox, Wilson became the first woman to win North America's oldest and Canada's most important race, the Queen's Plate.

On September 16, 2012, Wilson joined jockey Francine Villeneuve to become only the second Canadian woman to achieve the 1,000 career victories plateau, as she rode "D'wildcat Gold" to victory in the first race at Woodbine. Three days later by taking the fifth and sixth races at Woodbine, Emma-Jayne moved ahead of Villeneuve as Canada's all-time winningest female jockey, a distinction that Villeneuve had held for over 10 years.

Wilson ranks first in career earnings among Canadian women jockeys, as she has earned well over $91,000,000 in purses for her mounts.

In 2015, Wilson won the Shergar Cup alongside teammates Sammy Jo Bell and Hayley Turner, marking the first victory for an all-female side in this event.

In 2018, she became just the second woman to win the Avelino Gomez Memorial Award, given annually to jockeys who have made significant contributions to Canadian thoroughbred horse racing.

On July 11, 2024, she won the 4th race at Woodbine, to become the highest-earning female jockey in history, surpassing the record of $90,126,584 previously held by HOF rider Julie Krone.

In October 2024, Wilson suffered a neck fracture and shattered her pelvis when her mount Ready Shakespeare fell due to an apparent cardiac arrest. She was taken to Sunnybrook Health Sciences Centre and underwent surgery to stabilize her pelvis.

== Year-end charts ==
Chart (2005–present)	Peak position
National Earnings List for Jockeys 2005	29
National Earnings List for Jockeys 2006	32
National Earnings List for Jockeys 2007	22
National Earnings List for Jockeys 2008	30
National Earnings List for Jockeys 2009	38
National Earnings List for Jockeys 2010	62
National Earnings List for Jockeys 2011	18
National Earnings List for Jockeys 2012	30
National Earnings List for Jockeys 2013	42
National Earnings List for Jockeys 2014	42
National Earnings List for Jockeys 2015	68
