= Silver Deputy Stakes =

Annual horse race

- Class: Grade
- Location: Woodbine Racetrack; Toronto, Ontario, Canada
- Inaugurated: 1997
- Race type: Thoroughbred - Flat racing
- Website: woodbineentertainment.com

Race information
- Distance: 6.5 furlongs
- Surface: Polytrack
- Track: Left-handed
- Qualification: Two-year-olds
- Weight: 122 lbs. plus allowances
- Purse: $100,000 plus bonuses for eligible Ontario sired/breds

The Silver Deputy Stakes is a Thoroughbred horse race held annually during the fourth week of August at Woodbine Racetrack in Toronto, Ontario, Canada. Open to two-year-old horses, it is contested over a distance of 6 1/2 furlongs on Polytrack synthetic dirt.

In 2006, the race was run at 7.5 furlongs. 2009 will be its twelfth running.

In addition to the $100,000 purse, the event offers up to $10,000 in bonus money for eligible Ontario-bred horses as well as up to $15,150 Ontario Sired/Ontario Bred Breeder Awards.

The race is named for Windfields Farm stallion, Silver Deputy.

As of 2009 this race appears to be discontinued.

== Winners since 2000 ==
Year	Winner	Jockey	Trainer	Owner	Time
2008	Mine That Bird	Chantal Sutherland	David Cotey	D. Cotey/D. Ball/HGHR Inc	1:17.49
2007	Bear Holiday	Jerry Baird	Reade Baker	Bear Stables Ltd.	1:17.32
2006	Barilko	Constant Montpellier	David Dwyer	David Dwyer	1:33.31
2005	Bright N Golden	Jerry Baird	Frank Passero, Jr.	Colebrook Farms	1:17.98
2004	Wholelottabourbon	Francine Villeneuve	Nicholas Gonzalez	MAD Racing/Martha Gonzalez	1:18.14
2003	no race				
2002	Added Edge	Patrick Husbands	Mark E. Casse	Team Valor/Robert J. Wilson	1:19.39
2001	Nicholle's Devil	Todd Kabel	Robert Pion	Tenenbaum Racing Stable	1:18.90
2000	Ten Flat	David K. Clark	Roger Attfield	Attfield/Bill Werner	1:17.28
