= Jockeys (TV series) =

- Genre: Sports; Reality; Documentary; Drama
- Directed by: John Chester
- Presented by: Trevor Denman
- Narrated by: Eric Head
- Country of origin: United States
- Original language: English
- No. of seasons: 2
- No. of episodes: 19

Production
- Executive producers: Liz Bronstein; Tina Gazzerro; Gary Auerbach
- Producers: Jennifer Mullen; Paul Boese; John Chester; Patrick Deluca; Jeff Girion
- Production locations: Santa Anita Park, Arcadia, California
- Editors: Yvette Mangassarian; Sunny Bresin; Frank Lagnese; Joseph McCasland; Eric Myerson; Renaldo Romero
- Camera setup: Multiple
- Running time: 22 minutes
- Production company: Go Go Luckey Entertainment

Original release
- Network: Animal Planet
- Release: February 6 – October 2, 2009

Jockeys is an American documentary sports reality television series that premiered on February 6, 2009 on Animal Planet. The series chronicles the professional lives of jockeys during the famous thirty-day Oak Tree Meet at Santa Anita Park. First and second season episodes aired on Friday nights. Trevor Denman is the show's host.

The second season, which premiered on August 21, 2009 added Corey Nakatani and Garrett Gomez to the featured jockeys while Jon Court departed to race in Kentucky.

The taglines of the show are:

- "Win or Die Trying" for season 1 and
- "To Win It All You Have to Risk It All" for season 2.

"Stronger" by Kanye West is used as the theme song.

== Featured jockeys ==
=== Main ===
- Mike E. Smith – A veteran and Hall of Fame jockey
- Chantal Sutherland – Her move from Canada to California to continue her relationship with Mike Smith serves as a dramatic subplot in the series. Sutherland's struggles as a female jockey trying to break into a man's world is a key plot point.
- Joe Talamo – A young and successful jockey. The series chronicles how he handles success at a young age.
- Aaron Gryder – A veteran hard-working family man who has never won the big race but continues to press on.
- Jon Court – A 30-year veteran still chasing his dreams.
- Kayla Stra – A young Australian trying to break into the US racing world.
- Alex Solis – Solis is trying to recover from a broken back injury.
- Corey Nakatani – Breaks his collarbone in a fall early in the Oak Tree Meet in Season 1. His comeback his chronicled in Season 2.
- Garrett Gomez – Featured in the various episodes in Season 1 and was introduced as the nation's hottest jockey. He becomes a featured jockey in Season 2.

=== Other ===
- Iggy Puglisi – While not billed as a featured jockey in the series, Puglisi is a major focus in Season 2's second episode as he attempts to come back from a broken back injury.
- Brandon Meier – Brandon is the son of successful jockey Randall Meier.
- Gary Stevens – Featured in various episodes, he rides in the Jockey Living Legends race
- Sandy Hawley – Hawley wins the Jockey Living Legends race aboard Tribal Chief.
- Julie Krone – Featured in the Jockey Living Legends episode, Krone's status as the world's best female jockey is juxtaposed against Chantal's storyline.
- Angel Cordero Jr – Featured in the Jockey Living Legends episode.
- Pat Day, featured in the Jockey Living Legends episode.
- Rafael Bejarano – Featured in various episodes.
- Eibar Coa, cameos in the first two episodes.
- Edgar Prado – Cameos in the first two episodes.

== Episodes ==
=== Season 1 (2009) ===
No.	Title	Original release date
1	"At the Starting Gate"	February 6, 2009
Introduces rising star Joe and his effect on working man Aaron. Chantal decides to move to Los Angeles to live with her boyfriend Mike.
2	"One Good Horse (titled Zenyatta on Animal Planet's web site)"	February 13, 2009
Introduces Australian new girl Kayla as she tries to get her first U.S. mount. Mike races against nation's hottest jockey, Garrett Gomez.
3	"At What Cost?"	February 20, 2009
Introduces Brandon Meier, a young jockey hoping to rival the career of his father. Kayla takes a tumble.
4	"Broken"	March 3, 2009
Kayla considers quitting as she tries to win her first race at Santa Anita. Jon Court tries to prove that he still has what it takes.
5	"Losing Grace (titled Living with the Competition on Animal Planet's website)"	March 10, 2009
Chantal and Mike race against each other. Aaron races against a horse named after his daughter.
6	"Foul"	March 17, 2009
Joe rides for his girlfriend's father. After winning a big race on a horse with huge potential, Aaron Gryder faces a Stewards' inquiry.
7	"May the Horse be With You"	March 24, 2009
Joe turns to Mike for advice when he goes into a cold streak.
8	"Legend of the Fallen"	March 31, 2009
Some of the greatest riders of all time come out of retirement to risk it all on the track for one big race. Chantal faces a tough decision.
9	"Hands Down"	April 7, 2009
Alex rides a horse owned by his son. Brandon Meier has a hard time breaking through in Southern California.
10	"Go Big or Go Home"	April 14, 2009
Horse of the Year Curlin arrives at Santa Anita for the Breeders' Cup.
11	"Upset"	April 21, 2009
Jockeys and racing fans are shocked by the results of the $5 million Breeder's Cup Classic.
12	"It All Comes Down to This"	April 28, 2009
Mike Smith hopes to ride undefeated filly, Zenyatta, to victory and make his mark in horse racing history.

=== Season 2 (2009) ===
No.	Title	Original release date
13	"Life is a Gamble"	October 21, 2009
Corey Nakatani is ready to fight his way back to the top. Kristin Mulhall and Chantal Sutherland take a chance with a promising horse.
14	"I Want Revenge"	October 28, 2009
Three jockeys struggle for the same goals. Joe Talamo rides potential Kentucky Derby-bound I Want Revenge; Aaron Gryder tries to prove himself in Dubai; Iggy Puglisi tries to break back into the top ranks of jockeys.
15	"The Have Nots"	November 4, 2009
The women jockeys fight for their wins on and off the track in a male dominated sport.
16	"Split Decision"	November 11, 2009
Chantal and Jon must make a decision that will change the rest of their lives: should Chantal stay in California or go back to greener pastures in Canada.
17	"Tilt"	November 18, 2009
Alex Solis and his son face competition with rival trainer Bob Baffert, who enters a Rabbit in the race.
18	"No Such Thing as a Sure Thing"	November 25, 2009
After months of preparation, the jockeys are about to learn that nothing is a sure thing as they scramble to get a horse to ride in the Kentucky Derby.
19–20	"Nineteen Ways to Lose"	December 2, 2009
The Kentucky Derby arrives. Garrett, Mike and Joe prepare for the big moment while Chantal tries to score a mount aboard a horse she's ridden to Stakes victory before: Mine That Bird.
