= Francine Villeneuve =

Canadian Thoroughbred jockey (1964–2026)

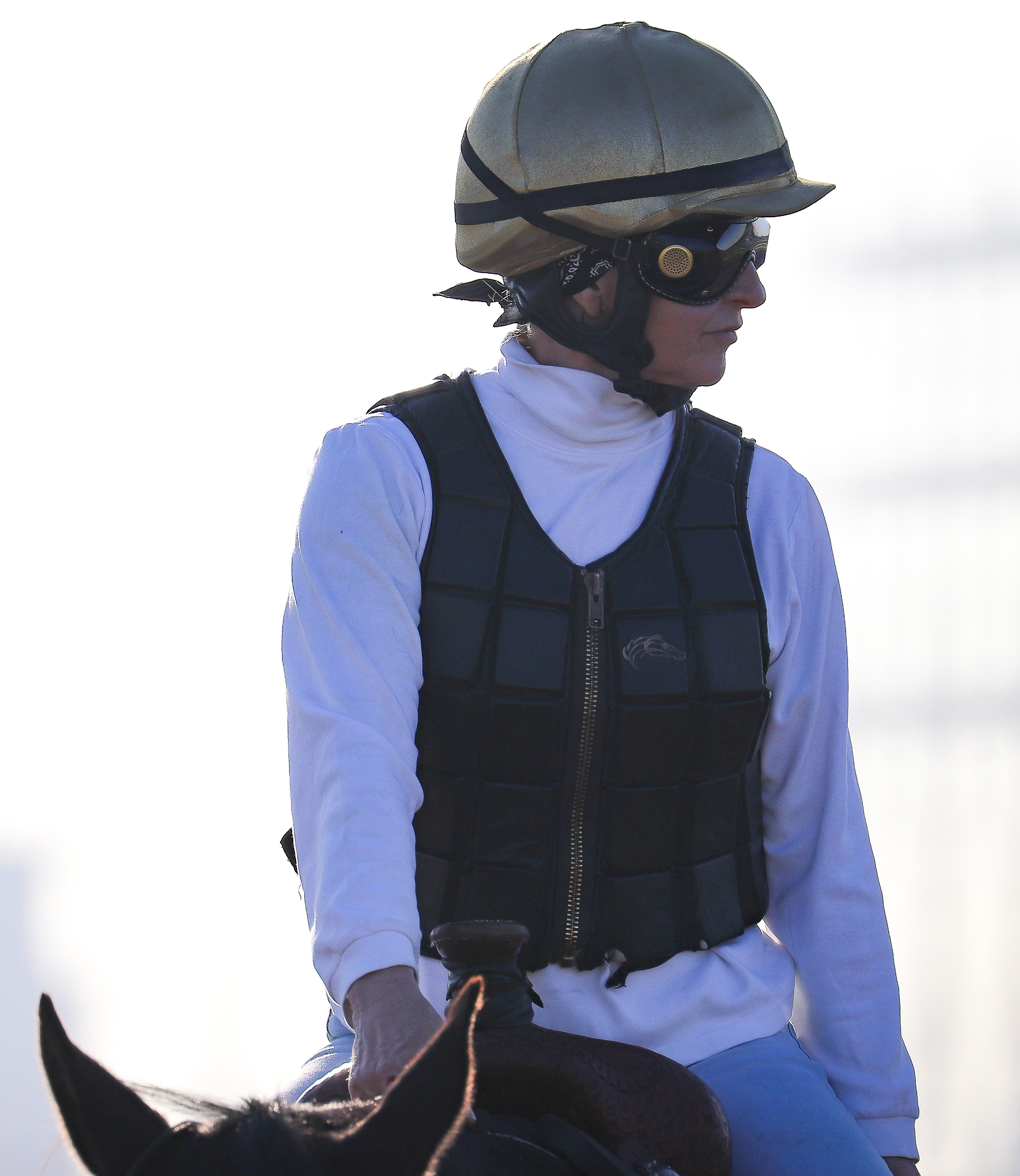
- Villeneuve training Thoroughbreds in 2018

Personal information
- Born: July 22, 1964 Ottawa, Ontario, Canada
- Died: June 5, 2026 (aged 61)
- Occupations: Jockey, Thoroughbred Trainer

Horse racing career
- Sport: Horse racing
- Career wins: 1,001

Major racing wins
- Autumn Stakes (1991); Bison City Stakes (1991); Durham Cup Stakes (1992); Hilltop Stakes (1997); Frost King Stakes (2003); Colin Stakes (2004); Silver Deputy Stakes (2004)

Racing awards
- Avelino Gomez Memorial Award (2004)

Honours
- (2012); Fort Erie Sports Wall of Fame; Queen Elizabeth II Diamond Jubilee Medal

Significant horses
- Wilderness Song, Concern, Autumn Snow

Francine Alicia Villeneuve (July 22, 1964 – June 5, 2026) was a Canadian Thoroughbred jockey and racing pioneer.

Villeneuve was sometimes referred to by the nickname "The Queen of Fort Erie" because of a long affiliation with the border oval. With 1,001 victories and 3,065 combined wins, places and shows, she retired "for good" in April 2012 as the winningest female Canadian jockey of all time and was the first Canadian woman to achieve the 1,000-wins milestone.

== Early life ==
The only child of Ron and Eleanor (née Broderick) Villeneuve, Francine grew up around horses on the family farm in Winchester Springs, Ontario and went to North Dundas District High School in the village of Chesterville. While attending Humber College for equine studies, she took a summer job at Woodbine Racetrack as a hot walker in 1984, and by 1987 she was a licensed racing jockey.

== Career ==
Within four years, in June 1991, Villeneuve crossed the finish line second in the Queen's Plate, riding Wilderness Song, making history as the first female ever to place in Canada's oldest and most prestigious race. At the same time she was also the first Canadian woman to even ride in the event, making it doubly special. By that August she had become the first (of only four women) to compete in all of the Canadian Triple Crown races; the Queen's Plate, the Prince of Wales Stakes and the Breeders' Stakes respectively, a feat that would not be duplicated by another woman for 16 more years. On November 2, 1991, Villeneuve became the first woman to ride in the Breeders' Cup Distaff, and was only the second in any Breeders' Cup race, as American Julie Krone had previously ridden at the Breeders' Cup in both 1988 and 1989.

Over the next decade and a half, the victories and the "first female to..." milestones began to accumulate rapidly. In May 2002 with her 600th victory, she overtook fellow pioneer Regina Sealock as the winningest female jockey in Canadian history (a crown she would wear for over ten years before being passed herself). Her career saw many successes culminating in 2004, when she became the first female winner of the prestigious Avelino Gomez Memorial Award. A year later she became the first woman to finish "in the money" at the 2005 Prince of Wales Stakes, barely missing the victory by a nose to finish second aboard a 16:1 outsider named Autumn Snow.

With over 25 years "in the irons" she rode more than 8,100 mounts and was also the first Canadian woman to reach the milestones of 1,000 seconds, 1,000 thirds, and the first to show a combined 3,000 times. All of this was achieved despite losing time in the saddle because of several serious injuries and taking two personal hiatuses from the sport; the first, a one-year break during her most active years to give birth to her son Aaron, and the second, a three-year sabbatical to better tend to her family. Her accomplishments made her a fan-favorite and inspired other Canadian women like Chantal Sutherland and Emma-Jayne Wilson. It was Wilson that would eventually overtake her record for most career victories in mid-September 2012. Sutherland would not pass her until 2017.

== 1,000th win, retirement and beyond ==
On October 31, 2011, in one of her final races, she rode Red Hot Doll to victory in the $30,000 Fan's Cup at Fort Erie Race Track for career win number 1,000. She retired as the all-time leading Canadian woman in wins, places and shows and was second only to Sealock in all-time starts. In June 2012 she was inducted into the Fort Erie Sports Wall of Fame. Villeneuve owned a horse farm in central Florida, where for a time she trained, bred and showed rare Akhal-Tekes. Because of her connection to the breed, she was extended the rare honour of being invited to race at the International Akhal-Teke Association meeting held in Ashgabat, Turkmenistan in late April 2012. She was the only female jockey in the field. Villeneuve was also a longtime supporter of the Juvenile Diabetes Research Foundation. It was announced in August 2012 that Villeneuve would also be a recipient of the Queen Elizabeth II Diamond Jubilee Medal at a ceremony held in November.

After galloping horses for Nick Zito at Saratoga in the summer of 2012 and then for others at Tampa Bay Downs during the following winter season, Villeneuve received her trainer's licence and like many Canadian trainers split her year between the Florida and Canada Thoroughbred racing seasons. In 2016, she and fellow jock-turned trainer, Amanda Roxborough, co-founded the Sport of Queens Racing Club. As a racing syndicate, SOQ allows everyday people to experience the thrill of thoroughbred horse ownership for as little as $200 a share, plus fees.

== Death ==
Villeneuve died from cancer on June 5, 2026, at the age of 61.

== Career charts ==
Francine Villeneuve: Career Thoroughbred Racing Summary
Active	Starts	Wins	Places	Shows	Earnings
1987–2012	*8,130	*1,000	1,019	1,065	*$15,466,554

- Equibase.com data do not reflect a July 2011 victory aboard Turbine in Kingston, Jamaica, which brings her totals to 8,131 starts, 1,001 victories and $15,471,404 in earnings.
