= Tom Ridge Stakes =

- Class: Ungraded
- Location: Presque Isle Downs; Erie, Pennsylvania, United States
- Inaugurated: 2007
- Race type: Thoroughbred, flat

Race information
- Distance: 1 3/4 miles (6 furlongs)
- Surface: Synthetic
- Qualification: 3-year-old
- Purse: $80,000
- Bonuses: $500

The Tom Ridge Stakes is an American Thoroughbred horse race run at Presque Isle Downs in Erie, Pennsylvania. First run in 2007, it was originally known as the Tom Ridge Labor Day Stakes when it was run the first two years on Labor Day. The race is a six-furlong event for three-year-old horses and is raced on Tapeta synthetic dirt.

In 2024, the race offered a purse of $80,000.

The race is named for Tom Ridge, who was the Governor of the State of Pennsylvania from 1995 to 2001.

== Records ==
Speed record:

- 1:08.16 - Noholdingback Bear (2016) (at current distance of 6 furlongs)

== Winners ==
Year	Winner	Jockey	Trainer	Owner	Time
2007	Elite Squadron	Dana Whitney	James E. Baker	Tom R. Walters	1:10.69
2008	Fatal Bullet	Eurico Rosa Da Silva	Reade Baker	Bear Stables	1:08.60
2009	Great Love	Erick D. Rodriguez	John J. Robb	Janet L. Wayson	1:10.00
2010	Rockin' Rockstar	Willie Martinez	Michael Lauer	Ralph T. Piercy	1:08.42
2011	Getaway Guy	Julien Leparoux	Greg Foley	Clarkland Farm/Foley	1:09.12
2012	Sum of the Parts	Julien Leparoux	Tom Amoss	Klaravich Stables/Lawrence	1:09.02
2013	Dan the Tin Man	Scott Spieth	Ricky Griffith	Debmar Stables	1:09:79
2014	Choctaw Chuck	Jose Angel Garcia	Kevin Rice	Clyde D. Rice	1:09.46
2015	Cyclogenisis	Trevor McCarthy	George Weaver	Matthew Schera	1:09.33
2016	Noholdingback Bear	Eurico Rosa Da Silva	Michael P. De Paulo	Bear Stables	1:08.16
2017	Balandeen	Albin Jimenez	Chris Hartman	Joey Keith Davis	1:10.31
2018	Trigger Warning	Irwin Rosendo	Mike Rone	Brinley Enterprises	1:08.71
2023	Dreaming of Kona	Scott Spieth	Aldana Spieth	Aldana Gonzalez Racing LLC/Ballou	1:10.68
2024	Ponce de Leon	Adam Beschizza	Kelsey Danner	Dede McGehee	1:08.85
