= Canadian Champion Female Turf Horse =

Horse racing honor

The Canadian Champion Female Turf Horse is a Canadian Thoroughbred horse racing honor that is part of the Sovereign Awards program awarded annually to the top female Thoroughbred horse competing in Canada in races on turf. Created in 1975, by the Jockey Club of Canada as a single award for Champion Turf Horse, it was first won by the filly Victorian Queen. In 1995, it was split into male and female categories.

== Past winners ==
- 1995: Bold Ruritana
- 1996: Windsharp
- 1997: Woolloomooloo
- 1998: Colorful Vices
- 1999: Free Vacation
- 2000: Heliotrope
- 2001: Sweetest Thing
- 2002: Chopinina
- 2003: Inish Glora
- 2004: Inish Glora
- 2005: Ambitious Cat
- 2006: Arravale
- 2007: Sealy Hill
- 2008: Callwood Dancer
- 2009: Points of Grace
- 2010: Miss Keller
- 2011: Never Retreat
- 2012: Irish Mission
- 2013: Solid Appeal
- 2014: Lexie Lou
- 2015: Catch a Glimpse
- 2016: Lexie Lou
- 2017: Starship Jubilee
- 2018: Starship Jubilee
- 2019: Starship Jubilee
- 2020: Theodora B.
- 2021: Jolie Olimpica
- 2022: Lady Speightspeare
- 2023: Fev Rover (IRE)
- 2024: Full Count Felicia
