= Victoriana Stakes =

- Class: Restricted Stakes
- Location: Woodbine Racetrack; Toronto, Ontario
- Inaugurated: 1975
- Race type: Thoroughbred - Flat racing
- Website: woodbineentertainment.com

Race information
- Distance: 1 1/16 miles (8.5 furlongs)
- Surface: Turf
- Track: Left-handed
- Qualification: Fillies & Mares, 3-Years-Old & Up (Ontario Sire Stakes program)
- Weight: Allowances
- Purse: CAN$125,000

The Victoriana Stakes is a thoroughbred horse race run annually in early to mid August at Woodbine Racetrack in Toronto, Ontario, Canada. An Ontario Sire Stakes, it is a restricted race for fillies and mares, age three and older. Contested over a distance of 1 1/16 miles (8.5 furlongs) on turf, it currently carries a purse of $115,000.

Inaugurated at Fort Erie Racetrack, it was raced there from 1975 through 1977 and again in 1994.

== Records ==
Speed record: (Through 1998, times were recorded in fifths of a second. Since 1999 they are in hundredths of a second)

Most wins:

- 2 - Christy's Mount (1977, 1979)
- 2 - Avenare (1980, 1981)
- 2 - Eternal Search (1982, 1983)
- 2 - Bold Ruritana (1994, 1996)
- 2 - Inish Glora (2003, 2004)
- 2 - Financingavailable (2006, 2007)
- 2 - Impossible Time (2010, 2011)

Most wins by an owner:

- 2 - D. H. Bunker (1977, 1979)
- 2 - Jim Dandy Stable (1982, 1983)
- 2 - Minshall Farms (1994, 1996)
- 2 - Robert Costigan (2003, 2004)
- 2 - K. K. Sangara (2006, 2007)
- 2 - Charles E. Fipke (2010, 2011)

Most wins by a jockey:

- 5 - Jim McAleney (1989, 1990, 1999, 2006, 2007)

Most wins by a trainer:

- 4 - Macdonald Benson (1990, 2000, 2003, 2004)

== Winners of the Victoriana Stakes ==
| Year | Winner | Age | Jockey | Trainer | Owner | Time |
|---|---|---|---|---|---|---|
| 2016 | Lexie Lou | 5 | Patrick Husbands | Mark E. Casse | Gary Barber | 1:41.05 |
| 2015 | Bear's Pride | 4 | Patrick Husbands | Reade Baker | Bear Stables | 1:40.22 |
| 2014 | Silent Star | 4 | Justin Stein | David R. Bell | CEC Stables | 1:42.90 |
| 2013 | Hobnobsnob | 4 | Gerry Olguin | Earl Barnett | Openwood Farm | 1:44.75 |
| 2012 | Moonlit Beauty | 6 | Eurico Rosa Da Silva | John LeBlanc Jr. | William Gierkink | 1:41.85 |
| 2011 | Impossible Time | 6 | Jesse M. Campbell | Roger L. Attfield | Charles E. Fipke | 1:43.15 |
| 2010 | Impossible Time | 5 | Jono Jones | Roger L. Attfield | Charles E. Fipke | 1:43.15 |
| 2009 | San Nicola Whiskey | 4 | Emma-Jayne Wilson | Robert E. Barnett | J. D. A. C. & F. Pirone | 1:42.13 |
| 2008 | You Will Love Me | 4 | Eurico Rosa da Silva | Earl Barnett | Bill Jones | 1:42.02 |
| 2007 | Financingavailable | 6 | Jim McAleney | Lorne Richards | K. K. Sangara | 1:41.26 |
| 2006 | Financingavailable | 5 | Jim McAleney | Lorne Richards | K. K. Sangara | 1:42.78 |
| 2005 | Spanish Decree | 6 | Gerry Olguin | Frank Huarte | Frank Huarte | 1:48.03 |
| 2004 | Inish Glora | 6 | Todd Kabel | Macdonald Benson | Robert Costigan | 1:41.97 |
| 2003 | Inish Glora | 5 | Todd Kabel | Macdonald Benson | Robert Costigan | 1:43.59 |
| 2002 | Ariel's Melody | 3 | Constant Montpellier | Steve Attard | C Attard & H Bhupaul | 1:43.52 |
| 2001 | Nymphenburg | 5 | Gary Boulanger | Jerry C. Meyer | Knob Hill Stable | 1:39.85 |
| 2000 | Bristol Pistol | 4 | Na Somsanith | Macdonald Benson | Augustin Stable | 1:40.66 |
| 1999 | Except For Wanda | 4 | Jim McAleney | Bruce Smither | George Richter | 1:43.84 |
| 1998 | Genuine Emerald | 4 | Richard Dos Ramos | Danny O'Callaghan | Estate G. R. Gardiner | 1:41.4 |
| 1997 | Classic Wonder | 5 | Mickey Walls | John P. MacKenzie | Rudy Singh | 1:41.00 |
| 1996 | Bold Ruritana | 6 | Robert Landry | Barbara Minshall | Minshall Farms | 1:45.4 |
| 1995 | Hey Hazel | 5 | Robert Landry | Roger Attfield | M. Canino | 1:41.4 |
| 1994 | Bold Ruritana | 4 | David Clark | James E. Day | Minshall Farms | 1:41.3 |
| 1993 | Myrtle Irene | 4 | Sandy Hawley | David C. Brown | M/M D. G. McClelland | 1:42.00 |
| 1992 | Country Stage | 4 | Dave Penna | Roger Laurin | Roger Laurin | 1:41.3 |
| 1991 | Shareefa | 3 | Mike E. Smith | Del W. Carroll Jr. | Hassan Shoaib | 1:42.1 |
| 1990 | Tarage | 4 | Jim McAleney | Macdonald Benson | Anderson/Curraghdale | 1:41.2 |
| 1989 | Majority | 5 | Jim McAleney | Michael J. Doyle | Double Axle Stable | 1:42.00 |
| 1988 | Ptermagant | 4 | Sandy Hawley | Stan Fishman | Kruger Brothers/Fishman | 1:42.1 |
| 1987 | Aromacor | 4 | Don Seymour | Michael Whittingham | Ventura Stables | 1:42.4 |
| 1986 | Insidious Charmer | 4 | Lloyd Duffy | Jacques Dumas | Pierre L. Levesque | 1:48.4 |
| 1985 | Tip O' My Finger | 4 | Jeffrey Fell | Gerry Belanger | Ed B. Seedhouse | 1:44.1 |
| 1984 | Lady Ice | 4 | Gary Stahlbaum | Michael J. Doyle | S. Simard | 1:45.1 |
| 1983 | Eternal Search | 5 | Lloyd Duffy | Janet Bedford | Jim Dandy Stable | 1:43.00 |
| 1982 | Eternal Search | 4 | Lloyd Duffy | Edward Mann | Jim Dandy Stable | 1:43.4 |
| 1981 | Avenare | 4 | Larry Saumell | Robert Donato | Jeffrey K. Rafsky | 1:44.1 |
| 1980 | Avenare | 3 | Brian Swatuk | Michael J. Doyle | Bo-Teek Farm | 1:45.3 |
| 1979 | Christy's Mount | 6 | George HoSang | David C. Brown | D. H. Bunker | 1:43.00 |
| 1978 | Regal Quillo | 5 | Avelino Gomez | Andrew Smithers | R. E. Leslie | 1:45.1 |
| 1977 | Christy's Mount | 4 | George HoSang | David C. Brown | D. H. Bunker | 1:48.3 |
| 1976 | Reasonable Win | 4 | John LeBlanc | Fred H. Loschke | Hammer Kopf Farm | 1:42.1 |
| 1975 | Victorian Queen | 4 | Robin Platts | Gil Robillard | Grovetree Stable | 1:44.1 |
