= La Lorgnette Stakes =

- Class: Ungraded Stakes
- Location: Woodbine Racetrack; Toronto, Ontario
- Inaugurated: 2000
- Race type: Thoroughbred - Flat racing
- Website: www.woodbineentertainment.com/qct/default.asp

Race information
- Distance: 1 1/16 miles (8.5 furlongs)
- Surface: Polytrack
- Track: left-handed
- Qualification: Three-year-old fillies
- Weight: Allowances
- Purse: $94,513 (2015)

The La Lorgnette Stakes is a Thoroughbred horse race run annually since 2000 at Woodbine Racetrack in Toronto, Ontario, Canada. Held during the third week of September, the ungraded stakes race is open to three-year-old fillies. It is raced over a distance of 1 1/16 miles on Polytrack synthetic dirt and currently offers a purse of $94,513.

The race is named in honour of Windfields Farm's Champion filly La Lorgnette who in 1985 won Canada's most prestigious race, the Queen's Plate.

== Records ==
Speed record:

- 1:43.32 - Leigh Court (2013)

Most wins by an owner:

- No owner has won this race more than once.

Most wins by a jockey:

- 3 - Patrick Husbands (2001, 2003, 2014)

Most wins by a trainer:

- 3 - Josie Carroll (2003, 2011, 2013)
- 2 - Robert P. Tiller (2001, 2014)

== Winners of the La Lorgnette Stakes ==
Year	Winner	Jockey	Trainer	Owner	Time
2015	Midnight Miley	Jesse M. Campbell	Julia Carey	Little Red Feather Racing	1:44.96
2014	Sweater Weather	Patrick Husbands	Robert P. Tiller	Frank D. Di Giulio, Jr.	1:43.70
2013	Leigh Court	Gary Boulanger	Josie Carroll	Melnyk Racing Stables	1:43.32
2012	La Tia	Justin Stein	Brian Williamson	Hernandez Racing Club	1:46.14
2011	Inglorious	Luis Contreras	Josie Carroll	Donver Stable	1:44.19
2010	Biofuel	Eurico Rosa da Silva	Reade Baker	Brereton C. Jones	1:45.49
2009	Hooh Why	Emile Ramsammy	Kenneth E. Hoffman	Derby Daze Farm/Hoffman	1:45.46
2008	Sugar Bay	Chantal Sutherland	Macdonald Benson	Augustin Stable	1:43.56
2007	Dance To My Tune	Constant Montpellier	David Cotey	D. Ball/H. Galbraith/Cotey	1:45.71
2006	Vestrey Lady	Jim McAleney	Reade Baker	Harlequin Ranches	1:44.91
2005	Coastal Fortress	Todd Kabel	Barbara J. Minshall	Minshall Farms	1:45.18
2004	Paiota Falls	Heberto Castillo, Jr.	William I. Mott	Dinwiddie Farm	1:45.14
2003	Willow Bunch	Patrick Husbands	Josie Carroll	Jim & Alice Sapara	1:46.79
2002	Mulrainy	Chantal Sutherland	Thomas O'Keefe	Wings of Erin Farm	1:44.04
2001	Madame Red	Patrick Husbands	Robert P. Tiller	Norseman Racing Stable	1:44.82
2000	Heat It Up	Gerry Olguin	Catherine Day Phillips	Kingfield Farms	1:44.59
