= Reade Baker =

Canadian horse trainer

Personal information
- Born: April 30, 1947 (age 79) Port Dalhousie, Ontario, Canada
- Occupation: Trainer

Horse racing career
- Sport: Horse racing
- Career wins: 1,119

Major racing wins
- Eclipse Stakes (1994, 2012); Cup and Saucer Stakes (1996); Fanfreluche Stakes (1996, 2000, 2003, 2008); Achievement Stakes (1999, 2006); Algoma Stakes (1999); Bison City Stakes (1999, 2004, 2010, 2011); Classy 'N Smart Stakes (2000, 2011); Fury Stakes (2002, 2003, 2005); Alywow Stakes (2003); Glorious Song Stakes (2003, 2011); Connaught Cup Stakes (2004); King Edward Stakes (2004); Nandi Stakes (2004, 2005); Star Shoot Stakes (2004, 2010, 2012); Lady Angela Stakes (2005, 2011); Selene Stakes (2005, 2007, 2010); Summer Stakes (2005); Vigil Stakes (2005, 2006); Woodbine Oaks (2005, 2015); Ballade Stakes (2006, 2013); Bold Ruckus Stakes (2006); Duchess Stakes (2006, 2007); Jacques Cartier Stakes (2006); La Lorgnette Stakes (2006, 2010); Queenston Stakes (2006); Woodstock Stakes (2006, 2009); Colin Stakes (2007); Cotillion Handicap (2007); Hill 'n' Dale Stakes (2007, 2008); Princess Elizabeth Stakes (2007); Royal North Stakes (2007); Silver Deputy Stakes (2007); Sir Barton Stakes (2007); Steady Growth Stakes (2007); Bold Venture Stakes (2008, 2009); Kentucky Cup Distaff Stakes (2008); Kentucky Cup Sprint Stakes (2008); Ontario Matron Stakes (2008); Tom Ridge Stakes (2008); Display Stakes (2009, 2013); Grey Stakes (2009, 2018); Mazarine Stakes (2009); Phoenix Stakes (2009); Swynford Stakes (2010); Wonder Where Stakes (2010); Bull Page Stakes (2010); Durham Cup Stakes (2011); My Dear Stakes (2011); Ontario Debutante Stakes (2011, 2015); Victoria Park Stakes (2011); Dominion Day Stakes (2012); Kennedy Road Stakes (2012, 2013); Plate Trial Stakes (2012); Seaway Stakes (2012); Coronation Futurity Stakes (2013); Dance Smartly Stakes (2013); Highlander Stakes (2013, 2015); Jammed Lovely Stakes (2013); Nassau Stakes (2013, 2014); Marine Stakes (2014); Victoriana Stakes (2015); Seagram Cup Stakes (2016) Canadian Triple Crown wins: Prince of Wales Stakes (2015)

Racing awards
- Sovereign Award for Outstanding Trainer (2005)

Honours
- Canadian Horse Racing Hall of Fame (2018)

Significant horses
- Bear Now, Biofuel, Fatal Bullet, Gold Strike, Judiths Wild Rush, Hunters Bay, Tu Endie Wei

Reade Baker (born April 30, 1947, in Port Dalhousie, Ontario) is a retired trainer of Thoroughbred racehorses who was voted the 2005 Sovereign Award for Outstanding Trainer in Canada and who in 2018 was inducted into the Canadian Horse Racing Hall of Fame. During his career Reade Baker trained horses that won 13 National Championships of which two earned Canadian Horse of the Year honors.

== Career ==
At age eighteen, Reade Baker worked in Toronto as a groom and exercise rider for Canadian Hall of Fame trainer Pete McCann. He went on to spend six years as the agent for jockey Gary Stahlbaum then in 1985 was hired as the racing manager for prominent Thoroughbred owner Richard R. Kennedy. In 1990 Baker opened a public stable.
