= Ontario Lassie Stakes =

- Class: Restricted stakes
- Location: Woodbine Racetrack; Toronto, Ontario, Canada
- Inaugurated: 1979
- Race type: Thoroughbred - Flat racing
- Website: www.woodbineentertainment.com/qct/default.asp

Race information
- Distance: 1 1/16 miles (8.5 furlongs)
- Surface: Polytrack synthetic dirt
- Track: left-handed
- Qualification: Ontario-bred two-year-old fillies
- Purse: $131,385

The Ontario Lassie Stakes is a Canadian Thoroughbred horse race run annually at Woodbine Racetrack in Toronto, Ontario. Open to Ontario-bred two-year-old fillies, it is contested on Polytrack synthetic dirt over a distance of 1 1/16 miles (8.5 furlongs).

Inaugurated at Toronto's Greenwood Raceway in 1979, it was raced there through 1993 at a distance of one mile. In 1994, the race was moved to Woodbine Racetrack and set at 1 1/16 miles.

The Ontario Lassie Stakes was run in two divisions in 1995.

== Records ==
Speed record: (Through 1998, Woodbine times were recorded in fifths of a second. Since 1999 they are in hundredths of a second)

- 1:45.32 - Inspired Kiss (1999) (on natural dirt)
- 1:43.98 - Resentless (2009) (on Polytrack)

Most wins by an owner:

- 4 - Sam-Son Farm (1984, 1986, 1987, 1993)

Most wins by a jockey:

- 3 - Robin Platts (1982, 1990, 1994)
- 3 - Todd Kabel (1991, 1999, 2006)
- 3 - Emma-Jayne Wilson (2005, 2014, 2015)

Most wins by a trainer:

- 4 - James E. Day (1984, 1986, 1987, 1993)
- 4 - Roger Attfield (1989, 1992, 1995, 2000)

== Winners since 1999 ==
Year	Winner	Jockey	Trainer	Owner	Time
2016	Ellan Vannin	Jeffrey Alderson	Tony M. Gattellaro	Jon Lee	1:45.05
2015	Sparkles' Girl	Emma-Jayne Wilson	John Charalambous	C. E. C. Farm	1:45.82
2014	London Tower	Emma-Jayne Wilson	Steve Owens	Steve Owens	1:44.73
2013	Paladin Bay	Gerry Olguin	Harold Ladouceur	Jessie Ladouceur	1:47.62
2012	Aunt Els	Justin Stein	Norman McKnight	R.M.C. Stable	1:46.17
2011	Dixie Strike	Patrick Husbands	Mark Casse	John C. Oxley	1:44.92
2010	Inglorious	Chantal Sutherland	Josie Carroll	Donver Stable	1:46.28
2009	Resentless	Chantal Sutherland	Ian Howard	Donald Ross	1:43.98
2008	Milwaukee Appeal	Na Somsanith	Scott H. Fairlie	C. E. C. Farms	1:45.43
2007	Krz Exec	Jerry Baird	Michael P. DePaulo	Sylon Stable & partner	1:46.19
2006	Palace Pier	Todd Kabel	Darwin Banach	William A. Sorokolit, Sr.	1:46.69
2005	Our Madison	Emma-Jayne Wilson	Joseph H. Johnson	Kenneth Sawatzky	1:49.26
2004	Silver Impulse	Emile Ramsammy	Stanley Baresich	B. & B. Stable & Winston Penny	1:47.46
2003	Six Sexy Sisters	Patrick Husbands	Mike Keogh	Gus Schickedanz	1:47.26
2002	Brattothecore	Jake Barton	John A. Ross	Jam Jar Racing Stable	1:47.80
2001	What A Breeze	Jake Barton	Earl Barnett	Hopefield Farm	1:46.34
2000	Poetically	David Clark	Roger Attfield	Kinghaven Farms	1:46.05
1999	Inspired Kiss	Todd Kabel	Thomas O'Keefe	Caroga Stables & Wings of Erin Farm	1:45.32

== Earlier winners ==
- 1998 - Last Vice
- 1997 - Wait for Silence
- 1996 - Mordacious
- 1995 - Trillia (1st div)
- 1995 - Heavenly Valley (2nd div)
- 1994 - Mips
- 1993 - Quiet Cheer
- 1992 - Hey Hazel
- 1991 - Parisinthespring
- 1990 - Grecian Earn
- 1989 - Bundle Bits
- 1988 - Sweet Briar Too
- 1987 - Tilt My Halo
- 1986 - Water Chimes
- 1985 - Grecian Touch
- 1984 - In My Cap
- 1983 - Sinister Spinster
- 1982 - Regal Taheka
- 1981 - Lady Treego
- 1980 - Muskoka Weekend
- 1979 - Girls 'L Be Girls
