= Grand Slam (horse) =

American-bred Thoroughbred racehorse

- Sire: Gone West
- Grandsire: Mr. Prospector
- Dam: Bright Candles
- Damsire: El Gran Senor
- Sex: Stallion
- Foaled: 1995
- Died: March 31, 2012
- Country: United States
- Colour: Dark Bay
- Breeder: Overbrook Farm
- Owner: Robert & Christina Baker, William Mack, David Cornstein, Michael Tabor, John Magnier
- Trainer: D. Wayne Lukas
- Record: 15: 4-5-2
- Earnings: $901,292

Major wins
- Champagne Stakes (1997); Belmont Futurity Stakes (1997); Peter Pan Stakes (1998)
- Last updated on December 3, 2007

Grand Slam (foaled 1995 in Kentucky, died March 31, 2012) was an American thoroughbred racehorse.

== Background ==
Trained by D. Wayne Lukas, the dark bay son of Gone West was purchased at the September 1996 Keeneland Sales as a yearling for $300,000 by Robert & Christina Baker, William Mack, and David Cornstein.

Grand Slam was sired by Gone West and out of Bright Candles.

David Cornstein's wife Sheila named the colt after a bridge hand in which all 13 tricks are taken. In 1997, Coolmore Stud purchased half of the colt for $500,000.

== Racing career ==
=== 1997: two-year-old season ===
A two-time Grade I winner as a juvenile, Grand Slam scored all four of his career victories over the dirt at Belmont Park.

At age two, he won the Belmont Futurity Stakes in September and Champagne Stakes in October, both Grade I races. Then in the 1997 Breeders' Cup Juvenile in November at Hollywood Park, he suffered a cut in his left hind leg going into the first turn and did not finish the race. He missed four months of racing while recovering from his injury.

=== 1998: three-year-old season ===
His first start back from injury was at Santa Anita in the San Pedro Stakes, where he finished sixth. A month later, he finished third in the Lexington Stakes at Keeneland, and in May, he won the Peter Pan Stakes.

The colt failed to win another race in his career, although after a 7th-place finish in the Belmont Stakes he was third in the Haskell Invitational as well as second in the Swaps Stakes, Jerome Handicap, and 1998 Breeders' Cup Sprint at Churchill Downs.

== Stud record ==
Grand Slam was retired to stud in after his 3-year-old campaign to Coolmore's Ashford Stud. His 2008 fee was $35,000. His progeny include Limehouse and 2003 Breeders' Cup Sprint winner Cajun Beat.
