= Victoria Park Stakes =

- Class: Ungraded Stakes
- Location: Woodbine Racetrack; Toronto, Ontario, Canada
- Inaugurated: 1988
- Race type: Thoroughbred - Flat racing
- Website: www.woodbineentertainment.com/qct/default.asp

Race information
- Distance: 1 1/8 miles (9 furlongs)
- Surface: Polytrack
- Track: left-handed
- Qualification: Three-year-olds
- Weight: Assigned
- Purse: $94,788

The Victoria Park Stakes is a Canadian Thoroughbred horse race run annually since 1988 at Woodbine Racetrack in Toronto, Ontario. Raced in early to mid June over a distance of one and one-eighth miles, it is open to three-year-old horses. It was run on dirt until 2006 when the new synthetic Polytrack surface was installed.

Named for Canadian Horse Racing Hall of Fame inductee, Victoria Park, the ungraded stakes race is considered the last prep for the Queen's Plate for any Canadian-bred participants.

== Records ==
Speed record:

- 1:49.80 - Jail Break (1997)

Most wins by an owner:

- 2 - Earle I. Mack (1995, 2006)

Most wins by a jockey:

- 3 - Dave Penna (1989, 1990, 1995)
- 3 - Todd Kabel (1994, 2000, 2001)

Most wins by a trainer:

- 5 - Roger Attfield (1991, 1993, 1995, 2005, 2015)

== Winners of the Victoria Park Stakes ==
Year	Winner	Jockey	Trainer	Owner	Time
2015	Billy's Star	Alan Garcia	Roger L. Attfield	Perfect Timber Partnership	1:51.42
2014	Conquest Top Gun	Eurico Rosa Da Silva	Mark E. Casse	Conquest Stables	1:50.96
2013	Five Iron	Luis Contreras	Robbie Martin	Fred M. Allor	1:50.38
2012	Prospective	Luis Contreras	Mark Casse	John Oxley	1:51.08
2011	Moonshine Mullin	Emma-Jayne Wilson	Reade Baker	Viking Farms	1:51.04
2010	Exhi	Robby Albarado	Todd Pletcher	Wertheimer et Frere	1:51.04
2009	Awesome Rhythm	James McAleney	John A. Ross	Domenic Triumbari	1:51.12
2008	Secret Getaway	Emma-Jayne Wilson	Michael Stidham	Sand and Cee Stable	1:51.11
2007	Approval Rating	Patrick Husbands	Mark E. Casse	Woodford Racing	1:50.89
2006	Harborage	Mike Luzzi	Gary C. Contessa	Earle I. Mack	1:51.70
2005	Palladio	Richard Dos Ramos	Roger Attfield	Haras Santa Maria de Araras	1:51.95
2004	Organ Grinder	Simon Husbands	Sid Attard	S. & B. Stable	1:51.55
2003	Pants N Kisses	Constant Montpellier	David Cotey	David Cotey et al.	1:53.12
2002	Tails of the Crypt	Jake Barton	John Ross	Jam Jar Racing Stable	1:50.36
2001	Dream Launcher	Todd Kabel	Andre Cappuccitti	Audre Cappuccitti	1:51.67
2000	Kiss A Native	Todd Kabel	David R. Bell	John A. Franks	1:50.97
1999	Irish Fury	Slade Callaghan	Ronald G. Burke	S & R Chen	1:51.45
1998	Silver Talk *	Robert C. Landry	Tino Attard	White Eagle Stable et al.	1:53.20
1997	Jail Break	Ray Sabourin	Mike Wright, Jr.	Mark Durigon	1:49.80
1996	Spider Wire	Robert C. Landry	Barbara J. Minshall	Minshall Farms	1:50.60
1995	Fritz	Dave Penna	Roger Attfield	Earle I. Mack & partners	1:52.40
1994	Stellarina	Todd Kabel	Daniel J. Vella	Frank Stronach	1:52.00
1993	St. Elias	Don Seymour	Roger Attfield	Virginia Kraft Payson	1:50.80
1992	Justfortherecord	James McKnight	Kathy Patton-Casse	Casse / Nedlaw Stable	1:50.80
1991	Shudanz	Don Seymour	Roger Attfield	Kinghaven Farms et al.	1:51.00
1990	Candid Cameron	Dave Penna	Trevor Swan	J. D. Cameron	1:51.00
1989	Happy Salesman	Dave Penna	Happy Alter	Arthur I. Appleton	1:50.60
1988	Regal Intention	Jack M. Lauzon	James E. Day	Sam-Son Farm	1:52.20

*In 1998, Kinkennie finished first but was disqualified and set back to fifth.
