= Inish Glora =

Canadian Thoroughbred racehorse

- Sire: Regal Classic
- Grandsire: Vice Regent
- Dam: Star Guest
- Damsire: Assert
- Sex: Filly
- Foaled: 1998
- Country: Canada
- Colour: Bay
- Breeder: C. G. Scott
- Owner: Robert J. Costigan
- Trainer: 1) Kathy Bremner; 2) Macdonald Benson
- Record: 32: 9-9-4
- Earnings: $935,128

Major wins
- Strawberry Morn Stakes (2002); Canadian Handicap (2003); Victoriana Stakes (2003, 2004); Nassau Stakes (2004)

Awards
- Canadian Champion Female Turf Horse (2003, 2004)

Inish Glora (foaled 1998 in Ontario) is a Canadian Thoroughbred Champion racehorse. She was sired by the Canadian Champion 2-Yr-Old-Colt, Regal Classic, a grandson of Northern Dancer. Her dam was Star Guest, a daughter of Irish-bred Assert who won four Group One races in Europe including the Irish Derby Stakes and Prix du Jockey Club.

Inish Glora was first trained by Kathy Bremner from a base at Hastings Racecourse in Vancouver, British Columbia where she raced at age two and for part of her three-year-old campaign. Sent to trainer Mac Benson at Toronto's Woodbine Racetrack, the filly would earn the Sovereign Award for Champion Female Turf Horse at age five and six.

Retired to broodmare duty at Windfields Farm near Oshawa, Ontario, Inish Glora has produced a foal by Gone West in 2006 and two by Elusive Quality during the next two years.
