= Kayla Stra =

Australian jockey (born 1984)

Personal information
- Born: 3 December 1984 (age 41) Adelaide, Australia
- Occupation: Jockey

Horse racing career
- Sport: Horse racing
- Career wins: 1716+ (ongoing)

Major racing wins
- City of Marion Stakes (2005)

Kayla Stra (born 3 December 1984) is a jockey and television personality in Thoroughbred horse racing who began racing in Australia, until coming to compete in the United States at racetracks in California. She currently rides once again in Southern California, after riding in the Northern California circuit. This was after a 2-year riding stint in the Southern California area. Stra is also known for her appearances on the reality television show Jockeys on Animal Planet.

== Biography ==
Kayla Stra was born in Adelaide, South Australia, Australia, where she launched her career in horseracing prior to moving to California in late 2007. From a very young age, Stra was interested in horses, having talked her parents into buying her a pony when she was eight years old. During her late childhood and adolescence, Stra worked at racing stables and eventually bought her first horse—a Thoroughbred named Gurtie, which she trained on her own for picnic races (unregistered race horses) before getting her certificate in racing.

Stra acknowledges her first trainer, Ray Moore, as someone who has had a strong racing influence in her life. Moore taught Stra how to be a horseman—how to communicate with horses by reading their body language and having a keen feel for what they're thinking. Stra credits John Letts as one of her mentors for his outstanding jockey career, having won two Melbourne Cups and hundreds upon hundreds of stake races.

As an apprentice, Stra was always in the top five riders and won all her premierships. During this time, she began traveling to different tracks to learn more from those experiences.

Stra eventually racked up approximately 500 victories in her native country and became the "poster girl" for Australian horseracing.. Racing in California, on 9 November 2007 Kayla Stra won her first American race aboard Flying Bearcat at Hollywood Park Racetrack. One notable victory was at Santa Anita on 49–1 longshot Paddin' Mud. In addition, Kayla scored an opening day victory at Del Mar with King Ledley, and then scored another victory aboard the same horse within three weeks. King Ledley is owned by Racing Capital Group, LLC, which is a race horse syndication company.

Stra became a leading Adelaide apprentice jockey who posted 220 winners in Australia. Her biggest Australian win was in the 2005 City of Marion Stakes with gelding Navy Shaker.

Stra was one of the jockeys featured in Animal Planet's 2009 reality television show, Jockeys. It lasted for two seasons.

Stra returned to professional horse racing in January 2013, after the birth of her son, Brys Headley, in November 2012. Soon after her return to racing, a steward banned her from the Betfair Hollywood Park jockeys' room for breastfeeding her son. One of the stewards had allegedly told Stra's agent that she needed to decide whether she was going to focus on caring for her child or her profession. California Horse Racing Board chairman David Israel overruled the steward, stating "Kayla Stra's baby can be in the jocks' room. Her nanny can be with the baby. And both the mother and the nanny can do all the things they need to do."
