= WEBN Stakes =

The WEBN Stakes or the 96ROCK Stakes is a one mile Thoroughbred horse race. It is held in February at Turfway Park. The race is open to three-year-olds willing to race one mile on the dirt, and is a designated points race for the Kentucky Derby. The race is an ungraded stakes with a purse of $50,000.

This race was formally called the Presidents Stakes. In 2002, it was renamed the WEBN Stakes due to a sponsorship arrangement with a Cincinnati based radio station. In 2009, the race was postponed a week due to unseasonable weather.

In 2013, the race was renamed the 96ROCK Stakes due to a new sponsorship arrangement.

== Past winners ==
- 2015 - The Great War
- 2013 - Mac The Man
- 2012 - Mr. Prankster (John McKee)
- 2011 -
- 2010 - Kera's Kitten (Thomas L. Pompell)
- 2009 - Parade Clown (Bill Troilo)
- 2008 - Big Glen (James Lopez)
- 2007 - Joe Got Even (Miguel Mena)
- 2006 - Warrior Within (Dean Sarvis)
- 2005 - Snack (Ramsey Zimmerman)
- 2004 - Silver Minister (Rafael Bejarano)
- 2003 - Champali (Jason Lumpkins)
- 2002 - Request for Parole (Perfect Drift placed.)
