= Arravale =

American-bred Thoroughbred racehorse

- Sire: Arch
- Grandsire: Kris S.
- Dam: Kalosca
- Damsire: Kaldoun
- Sex: Filly
- Foaled: 2003
- Country: United States
- Colour: Dark Bay
- Breeder: Bruce Lunsford
- Owner: Robert J. Costigan
- Trainer: Macdonald "Mac" Benson
- Record: 8: 5-1-1
- Earnings: $1,096,032

Major wins
- Natalma Stakes (2005); Alywow Stakes (2006); Del Mar Oaks (2006); E. P. Taylor Stakes (2006)

Awards
- Canadian Champion Female Turf Horse (2006); Canadian Horse of the Year (2006)
- Last updated on January 20, 2007

Arravale (born May 6, 2003, in Kentucky) is an American-bred Thoroughbred racehorse in Canada. Racing at Toronto's Woodbine Racetrack, at age 2 Arravale won two of her first three starts.

She made her first start at age 3 in June 2006, winning the Alywow Stakes at Woodbine. Racing in California, in early July she ran 3rd in the American Oaks at Hollywood Park Racetrack then with new rider Jose Valdivia, Jr. she won the August 19th Grade I Del Mar Oaks at the Del Mar Racetrack. In September's Canadian Stakes at Woodbine Racetrack, Arravale made a late charge but ran out of track and finished second. Back at Woodbine in October, she won her second Grade I event of the year, capturing the $1 million E. P. Taylor Stakes.

Arravale's performance in 2006 earned her Canadian Horse of the Year honours.
