= Presque Isle Downs & Casino =

Horse racing track in Erie, Pennsylvania

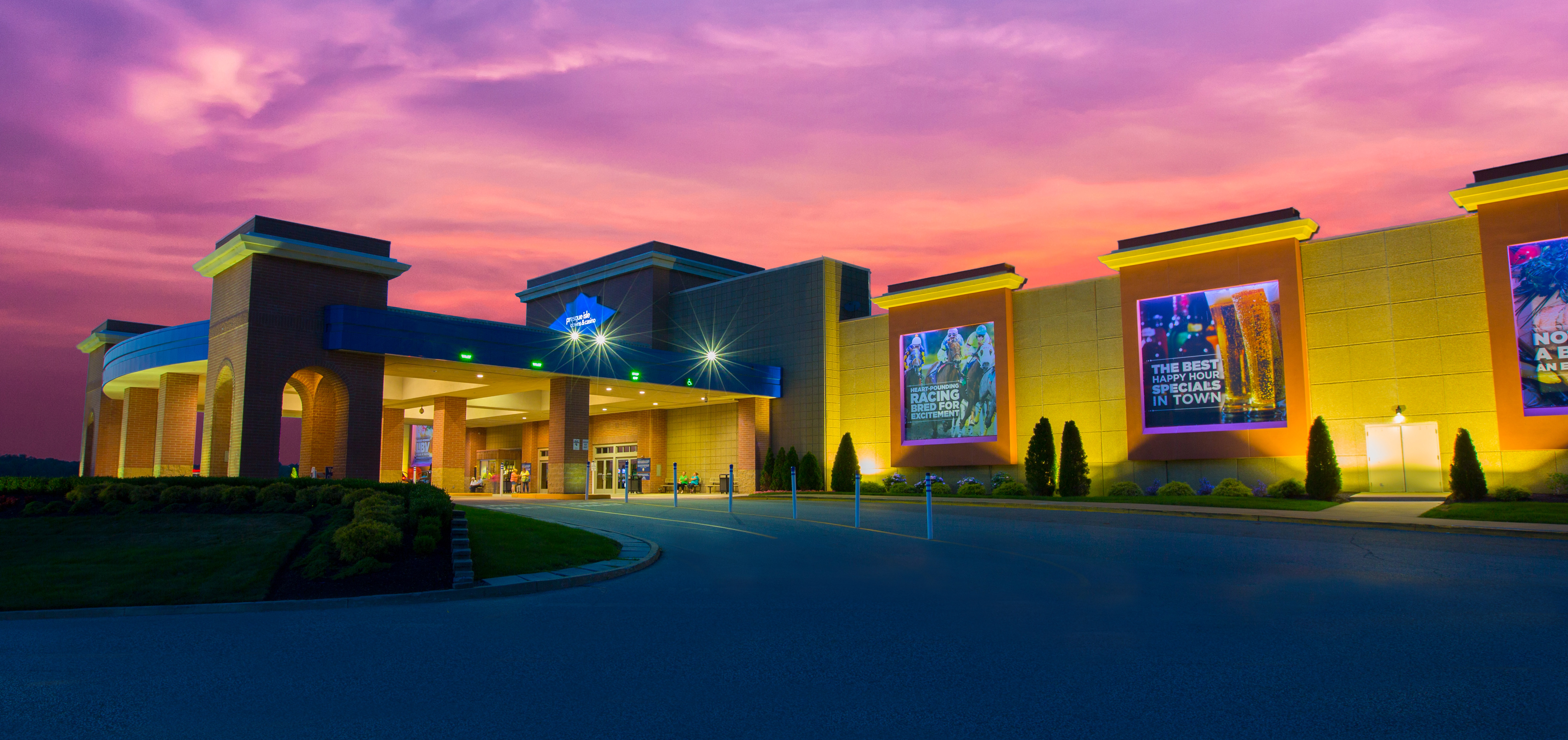

- Presque Isle Downs in Pennsylvania Presque Isle Downs & Casino (the United States)
- Interactive map of Presque Isle Downs & Casino
- Location: Summit Township, Pennsylvania; 8199 Perry Highway; 42.069°N 80.030°W
- Opened: February 28, 2007
- Gaming space: 48,074 sq ft (4,466.2 m^{2})
- Signature attractions: Thoroughbred racetrack
- Notable restaurants: LBV Steakhouse; Churchill's Bourbon & Brew Bar & Grille; Backstretch Buffet; The INCafe; The HUB; Bar 90; Trackside Bar
- Casino type: Racino
- Owner: Churchill Downs Inc.
- Website: presqueisledowns.com

Presque Isle Downs & Casino is a casino and horse racing track near Erie, Pennsylvania, owned and operated by Churchill Downs Inc.

== History ==
The developer, MTR Gaming Group, broke ground in October 2005 for the new facility, which opened on February 28, 2007.

Simulcasting was transferred from its former upper Peach Street location and became operational in August 2007.

In January 2019, Eldorado Resorts (the successor of MTR Gaming) sold the property to Churchill Downs Inc. for $178.9 million.

== Description ==
The casino contains 1,500 slot machines. The 1 mile (1.6 km) oval track opened on September 2, 2007. The racing surface is the synthetic material Tapeta Footings (a mixture of sand, rubber, fiber with a wax coating). It was the first synthetic horse racetrack longer than 1 mile (1.6 km) in the Northeast and the first racetrack paved with Tapeta in the United States.

Gaming revenue is split between the operator (45%) and the Commonwealth of Pennsylvania (55%), the latter of which will use the funds for property tax relief, economic development and tourism, and the horse racing industry. Revenue from table games goes to the state's general fund and the local government. Presque Isle Downs & Casino now operates table games, along with 1,600 slot machines.

On February 6, 2019, the Pennsylvania Gaming Control Board approved a sports betting license for Presque Isle Downs & Casino. The casino will construct a sportsbook and will also offer 50 self-betting kiosks. The BetAmerica self-betting kiosks began operation on August 9, 2019. On December 16, 2019, a three-day soft launch began for the BetAmerica online sportsbook. The full launch of the BetAmerica online sportsbook occurred on December 19, 2019.

The property is located on 272 acres (110 ha) off Exit 27 on Interstate 90 in Summit Township.

=== Graded events ===
The following Graded events were held at Presque Isle Downs in 2019.

Grade II

- Presque Isle Downs Masters Stakes

Other Stakes

- Presque Isle Mile
- Tom Ridge Stakes
- Satin and Lace Stakes
- Karl Boyes Memorial Stakes
- The HPBA Stakes
- Fitz Dixon, JR. Memorial Juvenile Stakes

== See also ==
- Gambling in Pennsylvania
