= Macdonald Benson =

American horse trainer

Personal information
- Born: June 30, 1930 (age 96) Wilmington, Delaware, United States
- Occupation: Trainer

Horse racing career
- Sport: Horse racing
- Career wins: 594

Major racing wins
- Duchess Stakes (1978, 1996, 2008); Seagram Cup Stakes (1978, 1982, 1983); Achievement Stakes (1979); King Edward Stakes (1979, 1982); Cup and Saucer Stakes (1980, 1981); Connaught Cup Stakes (1981, 1984); Princess Elizabeth Stakes (1981, 1992); La Prevoyante Stakes (1984, 1989, 1993); Natalma Stakes (1984, 1987, 1988, 1994, 2005); Wonder Where Stakes (1984); Canadian Oaks (1985, 1993); Swynford Stakes (1987); Mazarine Stakes (1988); Toronto Cup Stakes (1988); Victoriana Stakes (1990, 2000, 2003, 2004); Nandi Stakes (1992, 1996); Hendrie Stakes (1994, 2005); Ontario Colleen Stakes (1996, 2008); Bessarabian Stakes (1997, 1998); Coronation Futurity Stakes (1997); Display Stakes (1997); Ontario Matron Stakes (1997, 1998); Seaway Stakes (1997); Sir Barton Stakes (1999); Nijinsky Stakes (2001); Canadian Stakes (2003); My Dear Stakes (2003); Nassau Stakes (2004); Del Mar Oaks (2005); Whimsical Stakes (2005); E. P. Taylor Stakes (2006); La Lorgnette Stakes (2008); Eclipse Stakes (2009); Canadian Classic Race wins: Queen's Plate (1978, 1985); Breeders' Stakes (1979, 1984)

Honours
- Canadian Horse Racing Hall of Fame (2002)

Significant horses
- Arravale, Bounding Away, Choral Group, Deputy Jane West, Inish Glora, La Lorgnette, Legarto, Regal Embrace, Santa Amelia

Macdonald "Mac" Benson (born June 30, 1930, in Wilmington, Delaware) is a Canadian Horse Racing Hall of Fame trainer. A resident of Woodbridge, Ontario, Benson came to Canada in 1978 to train for E. P. Taylor's renowned Windfields Farm. Since then, horses trained by Benson have won ten Sovereign Awards and four Canadian Classics.

Mac Benson embarked on his professional training career in 1958 and began by working for prominent Delaware Thoroughbred owner, William du Pont, Jr. He later would operate a public stable, racing at tracks in Delaware, New Jersey, and Maryland. Among his clients in the early 1970s was another duPont family member, Bayard Sharp, who was a founding director of Delaware Park Racetrack and a former president of The Blood-Horse Inc. magazine. In 1976, Benson was offered a job by the head of operations for Windfields Farm who raced in Canada and the United States, and who maintained breeding operations in Maryland and Ontario.

Settling in the Toronto area in 1978, Mac Benson met with instant success as head trainer of the E. P. Taylor racing stable. He remained with Windfields Farm through the death of E. P. Taylor in 1989 and would later train for American George W. Strawbridge, Jr. and Robert J. Costigan of Vancouver, British Columbia. Still active in 2009, at age 76 Mac Benson trained Costigan's filly, Arravale, to 2006 Canadian Horse of the Year honors.

In 2002, Mac Benson was inducted in the Canadian Horse Racing Hall of Fame.
