= Chantal Sutherland =

America jockey (born 1976)

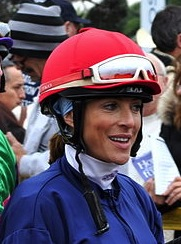
- Chantal Sutherland in 2009

Personal information
- Born: February 23, 1976 (age 50) Winnipeg, Manitoba, Canada
- Occupation: Jockey
- Spouse: Dan Kruse (2012–2016)

Horse racing career
- Sport: Horse racing
- Career wins: 1,200 (ongoing)

Major racing wins
- Bull Page Stakes (2002); La Lorgnette Stakes (2002); Seagram Cup Stakes (2002); Star Shoot Stakes (2003); Gotham Stakes (2005); Tom Fool Handicap (2005); Ashley T. Cole Handicap (2006); Miami Mile Handicap (2006); Irish O'Brien Stakes (2008); Wonder Where Stakes (2008, 2012); Silver Deputy Stakes (2008); Duchess Stakes (2008); With Approval Stakes (2008); Swynford Stakes (2008); Mazarine Stakes (2008); Grey Stakes (2008); Generous Stakes (2008); Eclipse Stakes (2009); Lady Angela Stakes (2009); Algoma Stakes (2009); Santa Ynez Stakes (2010); El Encino Stakes (2010); Fury Stakes (2010); Wishing Well Handicap (2010); Woodstock Stakes (2010); Queenston Stakes (2010); Nassau Stakes (2010); South Ocean Stakes (2010); Santa Anita Handicap (2011); Senorita Stakes (2011); Sunset Handicap (2011); Goodwood Stakes (2011); Hollywood Gold Cup (2012); Smile Sprint Stakes (2022)

Racing awards
- Sovereign Award for Outstanding Apprentice Jockey (2001, 2002)

Significant horses
- Mine That Bird, Inglorious, Game On Dude

Chantal Sutherland (born February 23, 1976, in Winnipeg, Manitoba) is a Canadian model, television personality and jockey in North American Thoroughbred horse racing. She is referred to as the Danica Patrick of horse racing. She is known for her appearances on the reality tv show Jockeys on Animal Planet, as well as being the poster girl for the Del Mar racetrack. During an interview on Sky Sports in the lead-up to the Dubai World Cup race, she said that her primary vocation was jockey.

== Background ==
Sutherland grew up in the Toronto, Ontario area where her father Hugh owned a horse farm and trained standardbreds. As a young girl, she played competitive field hockey and was invited to try out for Canada's junior World Cup team. She rode horses in equestrian events but after graduating from York University with a degree in communications and psychology, she decided to explore the opportunity to ride Thoroughbreds in flat racing.

== Career ==
Beginning in the year 2000, the Del Mar Racetrack's Del Mar Thoroughbred Club marketing team went through a major shift in their marketing direction. They realized they had to attract a more youthful audience as well as a female audience. They focused Del Mar as a fashionable destination, using social media and other avenues to market the racetrack. They hired jockey and model Chantal Sutherland to be the new face of the Del Mar racetrack. Their strategy paid off, as over 13 years later Del Mar has changed their demographics and audience attendance.

On October 9, 2000, at Woodbine Racetrack in Toronto, Sutherland won her first career race. The following year, she was voted the winner of Sovereign Award as Canada's top apprentice jockey, repeating in 2002 when she was one of Canada's highest-paid female athletes, earning $5.7 million in purses in eight months. She finished third in the Woodbine standings that year with 124 victories with earnings of $5,751,417. She finished 31st in the national earnings title in that same year as she earned $5,968,460 with victories of 136 and had 754 mounts. She remained in Canada until the end of 2004. In the winter of 2004, she rode the winter months in the Maryland Circuit riding at Laurel Park Racecourse.

She participated in the second annual Colombian Emeralds International Jockey Challenge on New Year's Day 2005 in Barbados, guided Maeve ($11.80) to victory in the first race, leading a 'Woodbine' sweep, as Jono Jones (Band Dancer) and Patrick Husbands (Blazing Colours) finished second and third, respectively. In 2005, she went to race in Florida and New York, where jockeys Ángel Cordero Jr., Shane Sellers and Edgar Prado helped her hone her skills. She rode the winter meet at Aqueduct in 2007. Her highlight in New York was a victory in the Tom Fool Handicap with Smokume at Belmont Park. During her time in New York, she rode for Hall of Fame trainer H. Allen Jerkens and trainer Todd Pletcher. In 2006, she partnered Gigawatt to win the Grade 3 Miami Mile Handicap.

Sutherland quickly became a top rider in Canada, but she realized that riding in Canada was never going to land her in the Kentucky Derby or the Breeders' Cup races. She then relocated to Southern California.

In 2007, she returned to Canada to ride at Woodbine after a 2-year stint in the New York and Florida circuit. She finished seventh in the Woodbine standings with 69 victories out of 572 mounts with earnings of $3,246,387. She finished 77th in the national earnings title that same year with 79 victories out of 668 mounts with earnings of $3,480,229.

From December 2007 to April 2008, Sutherland competed at Santa Anita Park in California. Retired U.S. Racing Hall of Fame jockey Gary Stevens said: "She has become the queen of the longshots. She has won several photos against top jockeys, which shows she is a strong finisher." Allen Gutterman, Santa Anita racetrack's head of marketing, said Sutherland "could become the best female jockey since Julie Krone." Sutherland returned to Toronto for the 2008 racing season, and on August 9 she rode five winners on a single race card. In the summer of 2008, she rode future Kentucky Derby winner Mine That Bird to stakes wins in the Silver Deputy, Swynford and Grey Stakes at Woodbine and finished 12th aboard Mine That Bird in the 2008 Breeders' Cup Juvenile at Santa Anita. She also rode Van Lear Rose in that year Breeders' Cup Juvenile Fillies to finish sixth. She rode the 2008 Oak Tree meeting as she left Canada in October 2008 to ride in California. She spent a total of 6 months in California as she rode also the 2008 Hollywood Park fall meeting and the 2009 Santa Anita meeting.

In 2008, she finished seventh in the Woodbine standings with earnings of $4,947,630 and had 89 victories out of 590 mounts. She finished 38th in the national earnings title with earnings of $5,937,965 and with victories of 116 out of 832 mounts.

She got publicity when she was one of the jockeys featured on the reality tv show Jockeys on Animal Planet. It lasted for two seasons.

Sutherland finished second in the 2009 Woodbine jockey standings with earnings of $7,588,868 with victories of 139 and had 981 mounts. She finished in 2009 22nd in the national earnings title as she earned $7,451,964 with victories of 159 and had 1,131 mounts. She was a finalist for the 2009 Sovereign Awards for Outstanding Jockey of the year.

Sutherland rode the 2010 Woodbine meet in Canada, and enjoyed a degree of success in California, winning both the Grade 2 Santa Ynez Stakes and the Grade 2 El Encino Stakes. It was her best year on earnings wise and peak position wise which placed her 13th on the National Earnings List with $8,778,038 on earnings with 152 wins.

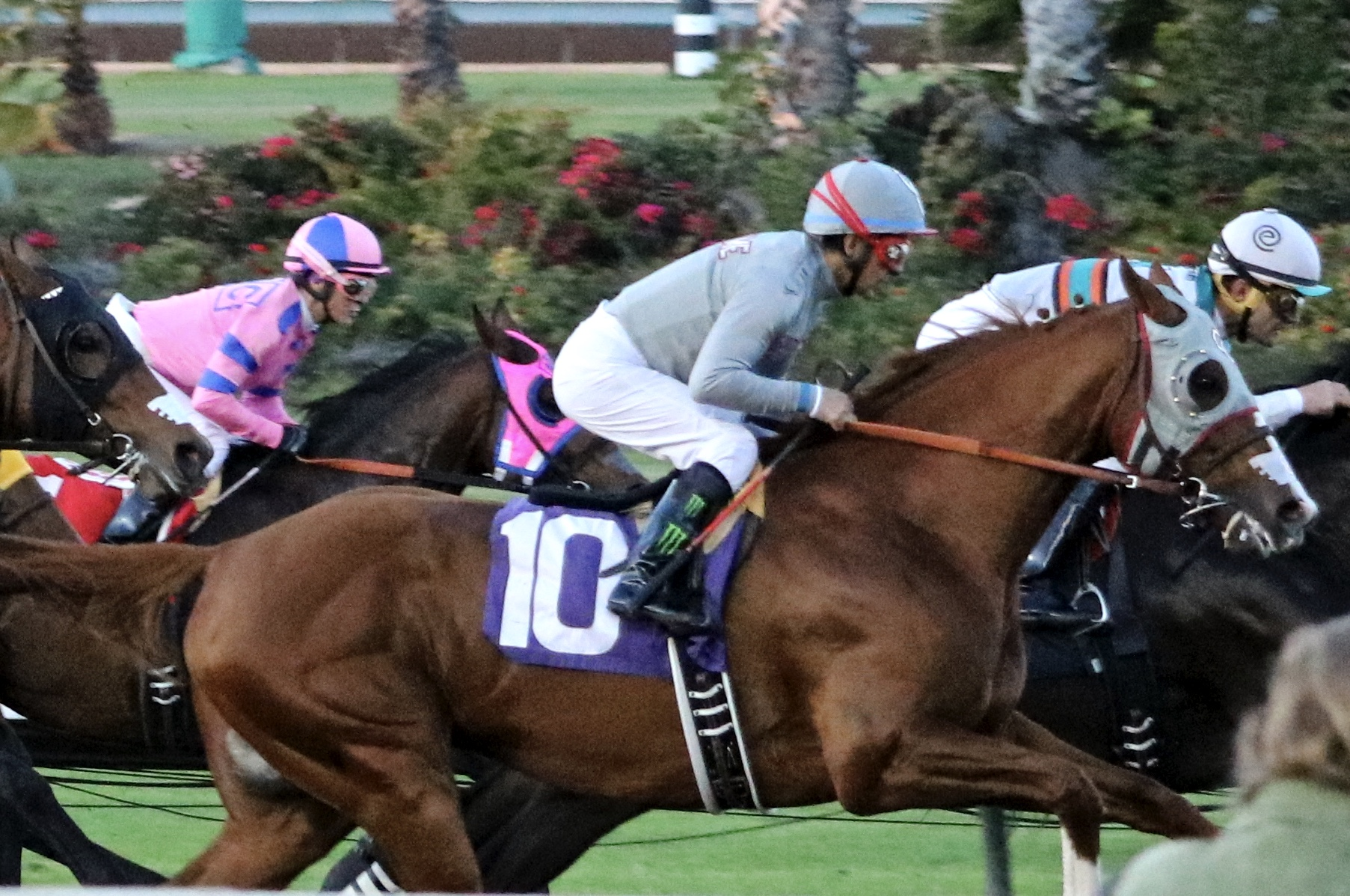
Sutherland (background, in pink silks) riding against Victor Espinoza and California Chrome at Los Alamitos Racetrack, 2016

Since 2011, she now rides daily on the Southern California Circuit. In March 2011 Sutherland rode Game On Dude in the Santa Anita Handicap and won by a nose in a victory that was as controversial as it was historic. It included a 12-minute stewards' inquiry due to heavy contact between her horse and two others at the top of the stretch. Ultimately the results were upheld by a 2–1 vote, making her the first woman jockey to win the Hundred Grander. In the Breeders' Cup Classic on November 5, 2011, she again led in the stretch with Game On Dude, as she sought to become the first women jockey to win the Classic. However, she was passed by Drosselmeyer, ridden by Smith, near the wire and finished 2nd to her ex-boyfriend.

On March 31, 2012, again riding Game On Dude, she made history as the first woman jockey to ride in the world's richest horse race, the $10 million Dubai World Cup. Running third at one point in the race, her mount faded towards the end, and finished 12th of 13 runners.

In July 2012, once again on board Game On Dude, Sutherland became the first woman jockey to win the Hollywood Gold Cup. On Sunday October 21, 2012 at Woodbine Race Course she announced her retirement from the sport of horse racing as a jockey. This would be short-lived, as she returned to racing in July, 2013 at Hollywood Park Racetrack.

On May 6, 2017, aboard Giro Candito in the third race at Santa Anita, Sutherland joined Emma-Jayne Wilson and Francine Villeneuve as the only Canadian-born women jockeys to reach the 1,000 wins plateau.

As of April 2025, Sutherland has only ridden in a single thoroughbred race since May 2023, at Meydan Racecourse on 5 April 2025.

As of May 2026, she is competing at Monmouth Park (NJ).

== Personal life ==
Sutherland had an on-again-off-again relationship with Hall of Fame jockey Mike E. Smith for six years, until 2010. Although engaged at one point, they broke the engagement in June 2010, two weeks before they raced each other at the Queen's Plate in Woodbine. In August 2011, the two were paired in a match race nicknamed the "Battle of the Exes".

Sutherland married businessman Dan Kruse in May 2012, nine months after meeting him on a blind date. They divorced in 2016.

== After The Wire ==
Chantal Sutherland's good looks have garnered much publicity. She has been featured in Sports Illustrated and had a four-page spread in Vogue magazine. She appeared in a 2004 TV commercial for Esquire watches. As well, she was chosen one of People magazine's "100 Most Beautiful People." In August 2008 it was announced that the Ottawa, Ontario-based cosmetics firm Mistura Inc. had signed Chantal Sutherland as the new face for their Mistura Beauty product line. She holds a pilot's license and has lent her time and efforts to several marketing and community endeavors at various racetracks throughout North America.

Sutherland appeared in five episodes of the television series Luck, which began airing in North America on HBO in February 2012, portraying the character Lizzy.

=== Year-end charts ===
Chart (2002–2011)	Peak position
National Earnings List for Jockeys 2002	31
National Earnings List for Jockeys 2007	77
National Earnings List for Jockeys 2008	38
National Earnings List for Jockeys 2009	22
National Earnings List for Jockeys 2010	13
National Earnings List for Jockeys 2011	38
