= Hendrie Stakes =

- Class: Grade III
- Location: Woodbine Racetrack; Toronto, Ontario Canada
- Inaugurated: 1975
- Race type: Thoroughbred - Flat racing
- Website: www.woodbineentertainment.com/qct/default.asp

Race information
- Distance: 6.5 furlongs
- Surface: Tapeta
- Track: left-handed
- Qualification: Fillies & Mares, four-years-old & up
- Weight: Allowances
- Purse: $116,205 (plus $50,000 for Ontario breds)

The Hendrie Stakes is a Thoroughbred horse race run annually at Woodbine Racetrack in Toronto, Ontario, Canada. Held in mid May, the Grade III sprint race is open to fillies and mares, aged four and older and is contested over a distance of 6 1/2 furlongs on Polytrack synthetic dirt. It offers a purse of $116,205 with an additional $50,000 for Ontario-bred horses provided by the Canadian Thoroughbred Horse Society (CTHS) through its Thoroughbred Improvement Program (TIP).

It was inaugurated in 1975 and run at the Fort Erie Racetrack for the first two years as the George C. Hendrie Handicap in honor of George Campbell Hendrie. The Hendrie's have been called one of Canada's most prominent racing families who, as did George Hendrie's father and grandfather before him, served as president of the Ontario Jockey Club.

== Records ==
Speed record: (Through 1998, times were recorded in fifths of a second. Since 1999 they are in hundredths of a second)

- 1:15.01 Embur's Song (2011)

Most wins:

- 2 - La Voyageuse (1979, 1980)
- 2 - El Prado Essence (2002, 2003)
- 2 - Creed's Gold (2025, 2026)

Most wins by an owner:

- 4 - Knob Hill Stable (1988, 1990, 1997, 2000)

Most wins by a jockey:

- 5 - Patrick Husbands (2003, 2009, 2011, 2012, 2014)
- 5 - David Clark (1986, 1989, 2000, 2004, 2005)
- 5 - Todd Kabel (1998, 1999, 2002, 2006, 2007)

Most wins by a trainer:

- 6 - Mark E. Casse (2012, 2013, 2014, 2021, 2025, 2026)

== Winners of the Hendrie Stakes ==
Year	Winner	Age	Jockey	Trainer	Owner	Time
2026	Creed's Gold	5	Rafael Manuel Hernandez	Mark E. Casse	Kristin Meldahl	1:16.14
2025	Creed's Gold	4	Rafael Manuel Hernandez	Mark E. Casse	Kristin Meldahl	1:15.54
2024	Gal in a Rush	5	Kazushi Kimura	Christophe Clement	West Point Thoroughbreds, Chris Larsen and Titletown Racing Stables	1:15.54
2023	Loyalty	4	Kazushi Kimura	Joise Carroll	Gainesway Stable (Anthony Beck) and LNJ Foxwoods	1:15.61
2022	Hazelbrook	4	Jason Hoyte	Lorne Richards	True North Stable	1:15.68
2021	Our Secret Agent	4	Kazushi Kimura	Mark E. Casse	Gary Barber	1:15.68
2020	Not run due to the COVID-19 pandemic					
2019	Summer Sunday	4	Rafael Manuel Hernandez	Stuart C. Simon	Anne & William Scott	1:16.62
2018	Code Warrior	5	Luis Contreras	Michael P. De Paulo	Zilli Racing Stables	1:16.75
2017	Code Warrior	4	Anne Sanguinetti	Rachel Halden	JC Racing Stable/Wachtel Stable/Barber	1:16.80
2016	Cactus Kris	5	Huber Villa-Gomez	Ryan D. Walsh	Anne L. Walsh	1:15.28
2015	Skylander Girl	4	Emile Ramsammy	Alexander P. Patykewich	Alexander P. Patykewich	1:15.12
2014	Spring in the Air	4	Patrick Husbands	Mark E. Casse	John C. Oxley	1:16.79
2013	Delightful Mary	5	Luis Contreras	Mark E. Casse	John C. Oxley	1:15.54
2012	Roxy Gap	4	Patrick Husbands	Mark E. Casse	Melnyk Racing Stables	1:16.46
2011	Embur's Song	4	Patrick Husbands	Todd Pletcher	Fares Farm	1:15.01
2010	Tribal Belle	5	James McAleney	Terry Jordan	Canvasback Farms	1:15.34
2009	Smart Surprise	5	Patrick Husbands	Josie Carroll	Hill 'n' Dale Equine Holdings	1:16.01
2008	My List	4	Eurico Rosa Da Silva	Nick Gonzalez	Tucci Stables	1:15.73
2007	Strike Softly	4	Todd Kabel	Mark Frostad	Sam-Son Farm	1:16.20
2006	High Button Shoes	4	Todd Kabel	Mark Frostad	Sam-Son Farm	1:17.38
2005	Nashinda	4	David Clark	Macdonald Benson	Augustin Stable	1:16.49
2004	Winter Garden	4	David Clark	Robert P. Tiller	Frank DiGiulio, Jr.	1:16.76
2003	El Prado Essence	6	Patrick Husbands	Audre Cappuccitti	G. & A. Cappuccitti	1:15.66
2002	El Prado Essence	5	Todd Kabel	Audre Cappuccitti	G. & A. Cappuccitti	1:16.86
2001	Mysterious Affair	4	Richard Dos Ramos	J. Mort Hardy	J. Mort Hardy	1:18.17
2000	Saoirse	4	David Clark	Phil England	Knob Hill Stable	1:16.58
1999	Kirby's Song	4	Todd Kabel	Tino Attard	Kirby Canada Farm	1:15.81
1998	Irish Cherry	4	Todd Kabel	Beverley Chubb	Pletan/McElwain	1:17.00
1997	Eseni	4	Mickey Walls	Phil England	Knob Hill Stable	1:15.60
1996	Klondike Strike	4	Ricky Griffith	Paul Nielsen	Mary Proctor	1:17.80
1995	Countess Steffi	6	Richard Dos Ramos	John Charalambous	Lieberman et al.	1:18.20
1994	Deputy Jane West	4	Robert Landry	Macdonald Benson	Lady Slipper Farm	1:16.60
1993	Dance For Donna	4	Ray Sabourin	Sherry Noakes	Aubrey W. Minshall	1:16.60
1992	Real Irish Hope	5	Sandy Hawley	Robert P. Tiller	G. J. Meyers	1:17.40
1991	Spanish Play	5	Sandy Hawley	Frank Huarte	Frank Huarte	1:16.00
1990	Volterra	5	Dave Penna	Daniel J. Vella	Knob Hill Stable	1:16.40
1989	Anglia	5	David Clark	Norman E. Smith	Golden Willow Farm	1:16.40
1988	Why Not Willie	5	Richard Dos Ramos	Patrick Collins	Knob Hill Stable	1:18.20
1987	Double Bundles	4	Ken Skinner	David R. Bell	John A. Franks	1:17.60
1986	Quitman	4	David Clark	Tony Mattine	E. H. Curnes	1:18.20
1985	Baldski's Holiday	4	Gary Stahlbaum	Michael J. Doyle	Eaton Hall Farm	1:17.40
1984	L'Epee	4	Irwin Driedger	Emile Allain	Terfloth Farms	1:17.20
1983	Wendy's Ten	4	Craig Perret	Warren A. Croll, Jr.	Blanche Levy	1:17.40
1982	Stellarette	4	Gary Stahlbaum	Tom Cosgrove	Frank Stronach	1:17.40
1981	Toga Toga	3	Dave Penna	Frank Merrill, Jr.	J. H. Hartigan	1:16.80
1980	La Voyageuse	5	J. Paul Souter	Yonnie Starr	Jean-Louis Levesque	1:17.00
1979	La Voyageuse	4	J. Paul Souter	Yonnie Starr	Jean-Louis Levesque	1:15.80
1978	Ms. Dolly A.	4	Gary Stahlbaum	Gerry Belanger	Ed Seedhouse	1:17.00
1977	Polder Pie	4	Jeffrey Fell	M. R. Clark	M. R. Clark	1:17.00
1976	Bye Bye Paris	3	Jeffrey Fell	Donnie Walker	Conn Smythe	1:17.20
1975	Trudie Tudor	4	Richard Grubb	John Morahan	Doug Banks	1:17.80

== See also ==
- List of Canadian flat horse races
