= Cup and Saucer Stakes =

- Class: Restricted
- Location: Woodbine Racetrack; Toronto, Ontario, Canada
- Inaugurated: 1937
- Race type: Thoroughbred - Flat racing
- Website: Woodbine Racetrack

Race information
- Distance: 1 1/16 miles (8.5 furlongs)
- Surface: Turf
- Track: Left-handed
- Qualification: Two-year-olds foaled in Canada
- Weight: Allowances
- Purse: $193,125 (2015)

The Cup and Saucer Stakes is a thoroughbred horse race held annually in October at Woodbine Racetrack in Toronto, Ontario, Canada. Open to two-year-old horses foaled in Canada, it is currently run at a distance of 1 1/16 miles on turf. Along with its dirt race counterpart, the Coronation Futurity Stakes, the Cup and Saucer Stakes is the richest race for two-year-olds foaled in Canada.

The race was first run on October 13, 1937 at Toronto's now-defunct Long Branch Racetrack. It was originally known as Mrs. Orpen's Cup and Saucer Handicap, named after the track owner Abe Orpen's wife. It held that name until 1947 when it was renamed the Orpen Cup and Saucer Handicap. It was changed to its current name in 1949.

The race was run from 1937 to 1952 on dirt at a distance of 1 mile 70 yards. World War II consolidations saw the race shifted to the Dufferin Park Racetrack from 1942 to 1945 before returning to Long Branch in 1946. In 1953, the racing distance was increased to 1 1/16 miles and remained at that distance after moving to the new Woodbine Racetrack in 1956. Converted to a turf race in 1959, the Cup and Saucer Stakes was raced at 1 1/8 miles from 1973 to 1982 but then reverted to its 1 1/16 miles in 1983.

The 1963 running was notable for who did not win as the future U.S. and Canadian Hall Of Famer Northern Dancer finished second. In the 1980s, Sam-Son Farm and their trainer James E. "Jim" Day came to dominate this event.

== Records ==
Time record: (at the present distance of 1 1/16 miles)

- 1:41.43 - Pyramid Park (2005)

Most wins by an owner:

- 13 - Sam-Son Farm (1982, 1984, 1985, 1986, 1987, 1988, 1989, 1990, 1993, 1994, 1999, 2000, 2001)

Most wins by a jockey:

- 5 - Patrick Husbands (2003, 2008, 2011, 2012, 2015)
- 4 - Sandy Hawley (1970, 1974, 1978, 1989)

Most wins by a trainer:

- 10 - James E. Day (1982, 1984, 1985, 1986, 1987, 1988, 1989, 1990, 1993, 1994)

== Winners of the Cup and Saucer Stakes ==
Year	Winner	Jockey	Trainer	Owner	Time
2021	God of Love	Rafael Manuel Hernandez	Mark Casse	Eclipse Thoroughbred Partners and Barber, Gary	1:47.86
2017	Dixie Moon (filly)	Eurico Rosa da Silva	Catherine Phillips	Sean & Dorothy Fitzhenry	1:44.33
2016	Tiz a Slam	Eurico Rosa da Silva	Roger Attfield	Chiefswood Stable	1:43.95
2015	Conquest Enforcer	Patrick Husbands	Mark Casse	Conquest Stables	1:43.17
2014	Passion for Action	Luis Contreras	Michael P. De Paulo	Benjamin Hutzel	1:42.66
2013	Matador	Luis Contreras	Mark Casse	John C. Oxley	1:47.89
2012	Star Contender	Patrick Husbands	Mark Casse	John C. Oxley	1:45.94
2011	Hard Not to Like (filly)	Patrick Husbands	Gail Cox	Hillsbrook Farms	1:48.00
2010	Celtic Conviction	Emile Ramsammy	Michael Doyle	Dura Racing/Doyle	1:44.88
2009	Hollinger	Tyler Pizarro	Roger Attfield	R. Harvey & A. Wortzman	1:42.53
2008	Utterly Cool	Patrick Husbands	Sid C. Attard	Jim Dandy Stable	1:44.62
2007	Deputiformer	Jono Jones	Mike DePaulo	David James	1:44.47
2006	Leonnatus Anteas	Jono Jones	Kevin Attard	Knob Hill Stable	1:45.58
2005	Pyramid Park	Slade Callaghan	Michael J. Doyle	Eaton Hall Farm	1:41.43
2004	Slew's Saga	Steven Bahen	Robert P. Tiller	Karen & Mickey Taylor	1:44.14
2003	Master William	Patrick Husbands	Michael W. Dickinson	Ken & Sarah Ramsey	1:42.46
2002	Mobil	Todd Kabel	Michael Keogh	Gus Schickedanz	1:42.33
2001	Atlantic Fury (filly)	Slade Callaghan	Mark Frostad	Sam-Son Farm	1:50.20
2000	Sky Alliance	Gary Boulanger	Mark Frostad	Sam-Son Farm et al.	1:42.49
1999	Dixieland Diamond	Todd Kabel	Mark Frostad	Sam-Son Farm	1:47.37
1998	Appalachian Chief	Richard Dos Ramos	James M. Dalton	William A. Sorokolit, Sr.	1:44.20
1997	Gudai Might	Richard Dos Ramos	David R. Bell	R. F. & J. E. Shaw	1:42.40
1996	Muskrat Sammy	Richard Dos Ramos	Reade Baker	Cinnamont & Assoc.	1:47.20
1995	Crown Attorney	Ricky Griffith	John P. MacKenzie	A. & M. Lamb	1:42.80
1994	Always a Rainbow	David Clark	James E. Day	Sam-Son Farm	1:42.00
1993	Comet Shine	David Clark	James E. Day	Sam-Son Farm	1:44.20
1992	Explosive Red	Mark Larsen	Daniel J. Vella	Stronach Stables	1:46.40
1991	Great Regent	James McKnight	Gil Rowntree	B. K. Y. Stable	1:42.80
1990	Rainbows For Life	Brian Swatuk	James E. Day	Sam-Son Farm	1:44.00
1989	Sky Classic	Sandy Hawley	James E. Day	Sam-Son Farm	1:42.40
1988	Wave Wise	Jack Lauzon	James E. Day	Sam-Son Farm	1:43.20
1987	Regal Classic	Dave Penna	James E. Day	Sam-Son Farm	1:44.20
1986	Devilish Gleam	Larry Attard	James E. Day	Sam-Son Farm	1:48.60
1985	Grey Classic	Irwin Driedger	James E. Day	Sam-Son Farm	1:43.20
1984	Dauphin Fabuleux	Jeffrey Fell	James E. Day	Sam-Son Farm	1:42.60
1983	Park Regent	Dan Beckon	Gordon Huntley	Parkview Stable	1:44.20
1982	Victorious Emperor	Irwin Driedger	James E. Day	Sam-Son Farm	1:50.00
1981	Brave Regent	David Clark	Macdonald Benson	Windfields Farm	1:52.80
1980	Frost King	Lloyd Duffy	Bill Marko	Ted Smith & Bill Marko	1:52.80
1979	Allan Blue	Joe Belowus	Gil Rowntree	Stafford Farms	1:51.00
1978	Nonparrell	Sandy Hawley	Jerry C. Meyer	S. Asadoorian	1:49.60
1977	Potential	George HoSang	Roy Johnson	Mrs. J. Josephson	1:53.00
1977	High Roller	Ron Turcotte	J. Lankinen	R. A. Kennedy & J. Indig	1:52.00
1976	Lucky North Man	Jeffrey Fell	Donnie Walker	Conn Smythe	1:49.60
1975	Proud Tobin	Jeffrey Fell	Gil Rowntree	Stafford Farms	1:50.40
1974	L'Enjoleur	Sandy Hawley	Yonnie Starr	Jean-Louis Levesque	1:46.40
1973	Cozy's Cousin	W. Green	David C. Brown	L. Jones	1:48.80
1972	Good Port	Hugo Dittfach	Gil Rowntree	Stafford Farms	1:53.00
1971	Presidial	John LeBlanc	W. Reeves	Windfields Farm	1:49.20
1970	Kennedy Road	Sandy Hawley	James C. Bentley	Helen G. Stollery	1:46.80
1969	Croquemitaine	Dave Dennie	Yonnie Starr	Jean-Louis Levesque	1:45.20
1968	Viceregal	Richard Grubb	Gordon McCann	Windfields Farm	1:46.40
1967	Arctic Blizzard	Sam McComb	Lou Cavalaris, Jr.	Larkin Maloney family	1:46.40
1966	Cool Reception	Avelino Gomez	Lou Cavalaris, Jr.	Larkin Maloney family	1:46.60
1965	Burning Luke	John LeBlanc	Richard B. Mattingly	Mrs. J. Cerullo	1:53.40
1964	Good Old Mort	Avelino Gomez	Jerry C. Meyer	Edward B. Seedhouse	1:45.60
1963	Grand Garcon	Richard Armstrong	Wolf Von Richthofen	F. A. Sherman	1:45.60
1962	Hop Hop	Hugo Dittfach	Carl F. Chapman	Larkin Maloney	1:57.80
1961	Peter's Chop	Sam McComb	W. Haynes	P. Del Greco	1:48.20
1960	Jammed Lucky	Hugo Dittfach	Yonnie Starr	Conn Smythe	1:47.60
1959	Victoria Park	Avelino Gomez	Horatio Luro	Windfields Farm	1:52.40
1958	New Providence	Ben Sorenson	Horatio Luro	Windfields Farm	1:46.20
1957	Chomiru	Samuel Cosentino	F. Look	Shermanor Farms	1:45.00
1956	Ali's Pride (DH)	E. Roy	William Thurner	W. J. Farr	1:45.80
1956	Lad Ator (DH)	Ernie Warme	Jim G. Fair	Jim G. Fair	1:45.80
1955	Canadian Champ	David Stevenson	John Passero	William R. Beasley	1:49.60
1954	Loyalist	David Stevenson	R. Punshon	W. A. Moffatt	1:47.20
1953	King Maple	Herb Lindberg	John Hornsby	Mrs. G. McMacken	1:46.00
1952	Canadiana	Jose Vina	Gordon McCann	E. P. Taylor	1:45.00
1951	Firey Red	Charlie McTague	G. Ward	G. Ward	1:46.60
1950	Libertine	Alf Bavington	Red Barnard	Medway Stable	1:47.20
1950	Little Secret	R. Fisher	Earl Harbourne	F. Little	1:47.00
1949	McGill	Chris Rogers	Willie Russell	Mrs. Frank Dougherty	1:46.00
1948	Speedy Irish	Johnny Dewhurst	O. Viau	C. George McCullagh	1:46.40
1947	Ohsodry	E. Roy	G. Campbell	L. H. Appleby	1:47.00
1946	Casa Camara	Herb Lindberg	Robert K. Hodgson	Willie F. Morrissey	1:49.80
1945	Kingarvie	Johnny Dewhurst	Arthur Brent	Parkwood Stable	1:54.00
1944	Uttermost	Robert B. Watson	Cecil Howard	Harry C. Hatch	1:54.20
1943	Heulwen	Chris Rogers	Arthur Brent	Parkwood Stable	1:52.00
1942	Arbor Vita	Pat Remillard	Robert K. Hodgson	Willie F. Morrissey	1:51.80
1941	Ten to Ace	C. W. Smith	Harry Giddings, Jr.	Harry Giddings, Jr.	1:44.60
1940	Warrigan	Tom Aimers	Frank Gilpin	Parkwood Stable	1:44.80
1939	Dark Comet	Charlie McTague	J. Hamilton	George M. Hendrie	1:49.60
1938	Archworth	S. Denny Birley	Mark Cowell	C. George McCullagh	1:44.00
1937	Suffern	Charlie McTague	William H. Bringloe	Harry C. Hatch	1:45.80

- Run in two divisions in 1950 and 1977. The second division in 1977 was won by Overskate but he was disqualified and set back to fourth.
