= Play the King Stakes =

Grass Stakes
- Class: Grade II
- Location: Woodbine Racetrack; Toronto, Ontario
- Inaugurated: 1987
- Race type: Thoroughbred - Flat racing
- Website: woodbineentertainment.com

Race information
- Distance: 7 furlongs
- Surface: Turf
- Track: Left-handed
- Qualification: Three-year-olds & up
- Weight: Assigned
- Purse: CAN$200,000 (since 2005)

The Play the King Stakes is a Canadian Thoroughbred horse race run annually at Woodbine Racetrack in Toronto, Ontario. A Grade II sprint race, it is open to horses age three and older and is run over a distance of seven furlongs on turf. It currently offers a purse of CAN$200,000.

Inaugurated in 1987 as the Toronto Budweiser Breeders' Cup Handicap, it was competed at a distance of six furlongs on dirt until 1996 when it was shifted to the turf and set at its current distance of seven furlongs. At the same time, the race was renamed in honor of Kinghaven Farms' 1988 Canadian Horse of the Year, Play the King.

The race was run in two divisions in 2000.

== Records ==
Speed record:

- 1:19.77 - Just Rushing (2008) (at current distance of 7 furlongs)
- 1:09.20 - Play the King (1987)
- 1:09.20 - Apelia (1993)

Most wins:

- 2 - Play the King (1987, 1988)
- 2 - King Corrie (1991, 1992)
- 2 - Soaring Free (2003, 2004)
- 2 - Le Cinquieme Essai (2006, 2007)

Most wins by an owner:

- 4 - Sam-Son Farm (1997, 1998, 2003, 2004)

Most wins by a jockey:

- 3 - Todd Kabel (1995, 2003, 2004)

Most wins by a trainer:

- 4 - Sid C. Attard (2008, 2009, 2010, 2016)
- 4 - Mark Frostad (1997, 1998, 2003, 2004)

== Winners of the Play The King Stakes ==
Year	Winner	Age	Jockey	Trainer	Owner	Time
2020	Not run due to the COVID-19 pandemic.					
2019	Silent Poet	4	Gary Boulanger	Nicholas Gonzalez	Stronach Stables	1:29.22
2018	Mr Havercamp	4	Eurico Rosa da Silva	Catherine Day Phillips	Sean & Dorothy Fitzhenry	1:23.94
2017	Conquest Panthera	5	Patrick Husbands	Mark E. Casse	Gary Barber	1:21.20
2016	Glenville Gardens	4	Gary Boulanger	Sid C. Attard	Janice Attard	1:20.82
2015	Reporting Star	5	Luis Contreras	Pat Parente	Copper Water Thoroughbred	1:20.66
2014	Kaigun	4	Patrick Husbands	Mark E. Casse	Quintessential Racing/Horse'n Around/Barber	1:20.71
2013	Dimension (GB)	5	David Moran	Conor Murphy	Riverside Bloodstock	1:19.89
2012	Big Band Sound	5	Tyler Pizarro	Daniel J. Vella	Kendel D. Standlee	1:21.62
2011	Havelock	4	Jermaine Bridgmohan	Darrin Miller	Silverton Hill	1:21.56
2010	Smokey Fire	5	J C Jones	Sid Attard	Jim Dandy Stable	1:20.83
2009	Jungle Wave	4	Todd Kabel	Sid Attard	Tucci Stables	1:23.06
2008	Just Rushing	7	James McAleney	Sid Attard	Tucci Stables	1:19.77
2007	Le Cinquieme Essai	8	Steve Bahen	Paul Nielsen	William A. Scott	1:26.28
2006	Le Cinquieme Essai	7	Steve Bahen	Paul Nielsen	William A. Scott	1:22.79
2005	Vanderlin	6	Martin Dwyer	Andrew Balding	J. C. Hitchins et al.	1:21.18
2004	Soaring Free	5	Todd Kabel	Mark Frostad	Sam-Son Farm	1:20.97
2003	Soaring Free	4	Todd Kabel	Mark Frostad	Sam-Son Farm	1:23.52
2002	Zone Judge	4	Constant Montpellier	Dave Dwyer	Winston W. Penny	1:20.42
2001	Mr. Epperson	6	James McKnight	Scott H. Fairlie	R. & S. Fairlie et al.	1:21.84
2000	Solitary Dancer	4	Mickey Walls	David R. Bell	John A. Franks	1:22.00
2000	Olympian	3	Na Somsanith	John Cardella	Rexdale Stable et al.	1:21.68
1999	Dawson's Legacy	4	Constant Montpellier	Norman McKnight	J. M. Stritzl Stable	1:21.87
1998	Skybound	4	Robert Landry	Mark Frostad	Sam-Son Farm	1:21.00
1997	Randy Regent	3	Sandy Hawley	Mark Frostad	Sam-Son Farm	1:23.40
1996	Jilin	4	David Clark	John MacKenzie	Greenoaks Farm	1:23.80
1995	King Ruckus	5	Todd Kabel	Daniel J. Vella	Frank Stronach	1:09.80
1994	Premier Angel	5	Sandy Hawley	Dennis M. Erwin	William Sorokolit	1:10.00
1993	Apelia	4	Larry Attard	Phil England	Knob Hill Stable	1:09.20
1992	King Corrie	4	Dave Penna	Sherry Noakes	Aubrey W. Minshall	1:09.40
1991	King Corrie	3	Pat Day	John A. Ross	Aubrey W. Minshall	1:09.40
1990	Cardel's Ruckus	3	Ray Sabourin	Joseph Attard	C. & D. Arnone	1:11.60
1989	Confederate Bill	4	James McAleney	David C. Brown	F. McDonnell	1:10.00
1988	Play the King	5	Don Seymour	Roger Attfield	Kinghaven Farms	1:10.40
1987	Play the King	4	Don Seymour	Roger Attfield	Kinghaven Farms	1:09.20

== See also ==
- List of Canadian flat horse races
