= Sky Conqueror =

Canadian Thoroughbred racehorse

- Sire: Sky Classic
- Grandsire: Nijinsky
- Dam: Heavenly Ballerina
- Damsire: Conquistador Cielo
- Sex: Stallion
- Foaled: 2002
- Country: Canada
- Colour: Chestnut
- Breeder: William A. Sorokolit, Sr.
- Owner: William A. Sorokolit, Sr.
- Trainer: Darwin D. Banach
- Record: 16: 7-1-3
- Earnings: $1,632,224

Major wins
- King Edward Breeders' Cup Stakes (2006); Northern Dancer Breeders' Cup Turf (2006, 2007); Turf Classic Stakes (2007)

Awards
- Canadian Champion Male Turf Horse (2006)
- Last updated on July 24, 2007

Sky Conqueror (foaled May 9, 2002 in Ontario) is a Canadian Thoroughbred racehorse.

== Background ==
Out of the mare Heavenly Ballerina, a daughter of 1982 United States Horse of the Year, Conquistador Cielo, he was sired by Sky Classic, a son of the 1970 British Triple Crown champion, Nijinsky. Sky Conqueror was trained by Darwin Banach,

== Racing career ==
Sky Conqueror was sent to the track at age three with his best Stakes race result a second in the Chief Bearhart Stakes at Woodbine Racetrack in Toronto and a third at Churchill Downs in November's Commonwealth Turf Stakes. Back on the track in April 2006, he had a fourth-place finish at Keeneland Race Course before being sent north to race again at Woodbine. After another third-place finish, he won the Grade II King Edward Breeders' Cup Stakes and the Northern Dancer Breeders' Cup Turf. He won an allowance race tune-up for the prestigious $2 million Canadian International Stakes in which he ran third.

Sky Conqueror made his 2007 debut in April at Keeneland Race Course, finishing fifth in the Grade II Maker's Mark Mile Stakes. In May, he defeated Better Talk Now and the favored Einstein in winning the Grade I Turf Classic Stakes at Churchill Downs. Back at Woodbine, in July he won his second consecutive Northern Dancer Breeder's Cup Turf. In August he finished third in the Nijinsky Stakes.
