= Charlie Barley Stakes =

Canadian Thoroughbred horse race run

- Class: Overnight stakes
- Location: Woodbine Racetrack; Toronto, Ontario (Canada)
- Inaugurated: 2001
- Race type: Thoroughbred - Flat racing
- Website: www.woodbineentertainment.com

Race information
- Distance: 1 mile (8 furlongs)
- Surface: Turf
- Track: Left-handed
- Qualification: Three-year-olds
- Weight: Assigned
- Purse: $77,440 (2016)

The Charlie Barley Stakes is a Canadian Thoroughbred horse race run annually in early July at Woodbine Racetrack in Toronto, Ontario. Therace is open to three-year-old horses and is contested on turf over a distance of one mile (eight furlongs).

Inaugurated in 2001, it was raced at a distance of one and one sixteenth miles in the first year. The race is named for the 1989 Canadian Champion Male Turf Horse, Charlie Barley.

== Records ==
Speed record:

- 1:33.02 - Dalavin (2004)

Most wins by an owner:

- 2 - Sam-Son Farm (2001, 2002)

Most wins by a jockey:

- 5 - Patrick Husbands (2003, 2004, 2006, 2012. 2016)

Most wins by a trainer:

- 5 - Mark Casse (2006, 2010, 2011, 2013, 2016)

== Winners ==
Year	Winner	Jockey	Trainer	Owner	Time
2016	Conquest Enforcer	Patrick Husbands	Mark E. Casse	Conquest Stables	1:33.63
2015	Samuel Dechamplain	Emma-Jayne Wilson	Mike Doyle	Eaton Hall Farm	1:34.73
2014	Stacked Deck	Chantal Sutherland	Barb Minshall	Bruce Lunsford	1:33.45
2013	Sky Commander*DQ	Justin Stein	Mark Casse	DCK Racing	1:34:35
2012	Hammers Terror	Patrick Husbands	Mike Stidham	Terry Hamilton	1:33.21
2011	Clement Rock	Luis Contreras	Mark E. Casse	Melnyk Racing Stables	1:36.59
2010	So Elite	Corey Fraser	Mark Casse	Woodford Racing/Westrock Stables	1:34.72
2009	Stylish Citizen	James McAleney	John A. Ross	Casanova Stud Enterprises	1:40.60
2008	Marlang	Richard Dos Ramos	Debbie England	Gus Schickedanz	1:35.66
2007	Ice Bear	David Clark	Macdonald Benson	Augustin Stable	1:33.82
2006	Seaside Retreat	Patrick Husbands	Mark E. Casse	William S. Farish III	1:34.21
2005	Gamblers Slew	Rui Pimentel	Jody Hammett	Herbert W. Chambers	1:33.64
2004	Dalavin	Patrick Husbands	Audre Cappuccitti	Audre & Gordon Cappuccitti	1:33.02
2003	Moonshine Hall	Patrick Husbands	Anthony Reinstedler	Eugene Melnyk	1:33.27
2002	Portcullis	Slade Callaghan	Mark Frostad	Sam-Son Farm	1:33.92
2001	Strut The Stage	Todd Kabel	Mark Frostad	Sam-Son Farm	1:40.90

(*Sky Commander won when Golden Sabre was disqualified)
