= Sir Barton Stakes (Canada) =

- Class: Restricted Stakes
- Location: Woodbine Racetrack; Toronto, Ontario Canada
- Inaugurated: 1975
- Race type: Thoroughbred - Flat racing
- Website: woodbineentertainment.com

Race information
- Distance: 1 1/16 miles (8.5 furlongs)
- Surface: Polytrack
- Track: Left-handed
- Qualification: Three-year-olds & up (Ontario Sire Stakes program)
- Weight: Allowances
- Purse: $92,438 (2016)

The Sir Barton Stakes is a Thoroughbred horse race run annually in early December at Woodbine Racetrack in Toronto, Ontario, Canada. An Ontario Sire Stakes, it is a restricted race for horses age three and older. Raced over a distance of 1 1/16 miles on Polytrack, the Sir Barton Stakes currently carries a purse of $93,938.

Originally restricted to three-year-olds, it is now open to older horses.

Inaugurated in 1975 at Greenwood Raceway and moved to Woodbine Racetrack in 1994, the race is named for the U.S. Racing Hall of Fame colt Sir Barton, who was the 1st U.S. Triple Crown Champion.

Since inception, the Sir Barton Stakes has been raced at a variety of distances:

- 7 furlongs - 1975
- 1 mile - 1976-1993
- 1/16 miles - 1994 to present

== Records ==
Speed record:

- 1:42.16 - Freitag (2016 - Track Record) (at current distance of 1/16 miles on Polytrack)
- 1:34.00 - Twist The Snow (1989) (New stakes and track record at 1 mile on dirt)

Most wins:

- 3 - Arch Hall (2004, 2005, 2006)
- 2 - Kingsport (2015, 2017)

Most wins by a jockey:

- 3 - Gary Stahlbaum (1980, 1982, 1987)
- 4 - Patrick Husbands (2004, 2005, 2006, 2015)

Most wins by a trainer:

- 3 - Mark E. Casse (2004, 2005, 2006)

Most wins by an owner:

- 3 - Melnyk Racing Stable (2004, 2005, 2006)

== Winners of the Sir Barton Stakes ==
Year	Winner	Age	Jockey	Trainer	Owner	Time
2017	Kingsport	5	Jesse M. Campbell	Sid C. Attard	Goldmart Farms/Royal Laser Racing	1:43.23
2016	Freitag	5	Alan Garcia	Mark R. Frostad	Earle I. Mack	1:42.16
2015	Kingsport	3	Patrick Husbands	Sid C. Attard	Goldmart Farms/Royal Laser Racing	1:43.14
2014	San Nicola Thunder	4	Jesse M. Campbell	John Cardella	Cooper/Pirone	1:45.99
2013	Ultimate Destiny	4	Luis Contreras	Alec Fehr	Alec Fehr	1:43.18
2012	Fifty Proof	6	Justin Stein	Ian Black	Kinghaven Farms/Fielding/Hutzel	1:43.46
2011	Crowns Path	3	Gerry Olguin	Greg De Gannes	J. M. Stritzl Stable	1:44.01
2010	Sands Cove	5	Richard Dos Ramos	Roger Attfield	Ralph L. Johnson	1:44.06
2009	Genius Kinshasa	3	Emile Ramsammy	Vito Armata	Vito Armata	1:44.26
2008	Dancer's Bajan	4	Patrick Husbands	Robert P. Tiller	3 Sons Racing Stable Ltd.	1:43.60
2007	Executive Choice	6	Jim McAleney	Reade Baker	J. Aston/A. Onesi/Bull Market St	1:42.85
2006	Arch Hall	5	Patrick Husbands	Mark E. Casse	Melnyk Racing Stable	1:45.89
2005	Arch Hall	4	Patrick Husbands	Mark E. Casse	Melnyk Racing Stable	1:44.13
2004	Arch Hall	3	Patrick Husbands	Mark E. Casse	Melnyk Racing Stable	1:45.04
2003	Time Of War	3	Jim McAleney	Alec Fehr	Knob Hill Stable	1:46.10
2002	Barbeau Ruckus	3	Constant Montpellier	Ross Armata	T. Thavamalar/J. Armata	1:44.47
2001	Devil Valentine	3	Emile Ramsammy	Fenton Platts	S. & G. Gibbs	1:45.08
2000	Prince of Style	3	Slade Callaghan	Grant Pearce	William Diamant	1:45.14
1999	Hot Pepper Hill	3	Robert Landry	Macdonald Benson	Cedarow Farms	1:45.20
1998	One Way Love	3	David Clark	Michael J. Wright, Jr.	B. Schickedanz & J. Hillier	1:44.80
1997	Arctic Squall	3	Todd Kabel	Tino Attard	Shahina Ahmad	1:43.60
1996	Regal Courser	3	Ray Sabourin	John A. Ross	Stan Richardson	1:45.20
1995	Dr. Ktonborg	3	Emile Ramsammy	Don J. Campbell	L. B. Sukhdeo	1:45.20
1994	Parental Pressure	3	Robert Landry	Fred H. Loschke	Hammer Kopf, Corrente & Ptns	1:44.60
1993	Carry The Crown	3	David Clark	James E. Day	Sam-Son Farm	1:39.20
1992	Grand Hooley	3	Daniel David	Sid C. Attard	P. E. L. Racing Stable	1:40.20
1991	Rainbow Gold	3	Daniel David	David Guitard	Kings Lane Farm	1:40.20
1990	Complete Endeavor	3	Richard Dos Ramos	Debbie England	Huntington Stud Farm	1:38.40
1989	Twist The Snow	3	Larry Attard	Roger Poynter	Angus McArthur	1:34.00
1988	Bouncing Brave	3	Dave Penna	George M. Carter	P. Lamantia / J. Russell	1:39.40
1987	Interrex	3	Gary Stahlbaum	Phil England	Kennedy/Miglietti Estate	1:39.20
1986	Steady Effort	3	Robin Platts	Roger Attfield	Kinghaven Farms	1:39.40
1985	Bert James	3	Lloyd Duffy	Daniel J. Vella	Knob Hill Stable	1:39.60
1984	Park Regent	3	Jeffrey Fell	Gordon M. Huntley	Parkview Stable	1:38.00
1983	Gone to Royalty	3	Irwin Driedger	Jacques Dumas	Pierre-Louis Levesque	1:40.20
1982	Son of Briartic	3	Gary Stahlbaum	Jerry G. Lavigne	Paddockhurst Stable	1:40.60
1981	Play The Hornpipe	3	George HoSang	James E. Day	Sam-Son Farm	1:37.60
1980	My Only Love	3	Gary Stahlbaum	Phil England	Mrs. M. Sutherland	1:37.20
1979	Mr. Kapacity	3	B. Smythe	W. Norris	Paddockhurst Stable	1:40.60
1978	Knight's Turn	3	John Bell	Emile M. Allain	Mrs. C. Terfloth	1:39.00
1977	Regent Bird	3	Robin Platts	Thomas O'Keefe	Request Farm	1:41.80
1976	Lucky Conn	3	Jeffrey Fell	Donnie Walker	Conn Smythe	1:38.40
1975	Banqueroute	3	Lloyd Duffy	Jacques Dumas	Jean-Louis Levesque	1:25.20
