= Arch Hall (horse) =

Canadian-bred Thoroughbred racehorse

- Sire: Archers Bay
- Grandsire: Silver Deputy
- Dam: Selena Smile
- Damsire: Fortunate Prospect
- Sex: Stallion
- Foaled: 2001
- Country: Canada
- Colour: Bay
- Breeder: Eugene Melnyk
- Owner: Melnyk Racing Stable
- Trainer: Mark E. Casse
- Record: 28: 10-6-3
- Earnings: $697,641

Major wins
- Sir Barton Stakes (2004, 2005, 2006); Eclipse Stakes (2006); Bunty Lawless Stakes (2006)

Arch Hall (foaled 2001 in Ontario) is a Canadian Thoroughbred racehorse best known for his three consecutive wins in the Sir Barton Stakes at Woodbine Racetrack in Toronto, Ontario. Owned and bred by Eugene Melnyk, he was out of the mare Selena Smile and sired by Archers Bay, the grandson of Leading sire in North America, Deputy Minister. Eugene Melnyk owned Archers Bay who won the 1998 Queen's Plate and was voted Canadian Champion Three-Year Old Colt.

Ridden by Patrick Husbands, Arch Hall won the first of his three straight Sir Barton Stakes in 2004. After winning the race again in December 2005, he then had his best year in 2006, winning the Grade III Eclipse Stakes and his third Sir Barton Stakes, plus earning a second in both the Razorback Breeders' Cup Handicap and the Fifth Season Stakes at Oaklawn Park Race Track in Hot Springs, Arkansas.

Arch Hall raced at age six in 2007. He attempted to win his fourth consecutive Sir Barton Stakes but finished sixth. His best result for 2007 was a second to Leonnatus Anteas in the Durham Cup Stakes.
