= Carotene (horse) =

Canadian-bred Thoroughbred racehorse

- Sire: Great Nephew
- Grandsire: Honeway
- Dam: Carrot Top
- Damsire: High Hat
- Sex: Filly
- Foaled: 1983
- Country: Canada
- Colour: Chestnut
- Breeder: Kinghaven Farms
- Owner: Kinghaven Farms
- Trainer: Roger Attfield
- Record: 40: 12-8-5
- Earnings: $1,267,092

Major wins
- Breeders' Stakes (1986); Toronto Cup Stakes (1986); Wonder Where Stakes (1986); Nassau Stakes (1987); Matchmaker Handicap (1987); New Hampshire Sweepstakes Handicap (1987); Yellow Ribbon Stakes (1987); Pan American Handicap (1988)

Awards
- Canadian Champion 3-Yr-Old Filly (1986); Canadian Champion Turf Horse (1986, 1987, 1988); Canadian Champion Older Female Horse (1987, 1988)

Honours
- Canadian Horse Racing Hall of Fame (2003); Carotene Stakes at Woodbine Racetrack

Carotene (foaled 1983 in Ontario) is a Canadian Thoroughbred Hall of Fame racehorse who holds the filly or mare record for winning the most Sovereign Awards. Bred by David Willmot's Kinghaven Farms, she was a daughter of the British sire Great Nephew, who also sired Epsom Derby winners Grundy and Shergar. Carotene's dam was Carrot Top, a mare David Willmot purchased in foal from the Whitney family at the 1982 dispersal sale of their bloodstock in the United Kingdom.

== Racing career ==
=== 1985 & 1986 Racing Seasons ===
Carotene was trained by Canadian Horse Racing Hall of Fame inductee Roger Attfield and raced from a base at Woodbine Racetrack in Toronto. In 1985, the two-year-old filly won her only start. The following year, she won the Toronto Cup Stakes, and the Wonder Where Stakes. She ran second in the 1986 E. P. Taylor Stakes and after going to California to race, finished third in the Yellow Ribbon Stakes at Santa Anita Park.

In the 1986 Canadian Triple Crown races for three-year-olds dominated by males, she finished second to Golden Choice in the Prince of Wales Stakes on dirt, then under jockey Richard Dos Ramos won the third and longest leg of the series run on turf, the 1½ mile Breeders' Stakes. Sent to Japan for the 1986 Japan Cup, Carotene finished ninth to winner Jupiter Ireland.

Carotene's 1986 performances earned her two Sovereign Awards for Canadian Champion 3-Yr-Old Filly and the first of her three consecutive Canadian Champion Turf Horse titles.

=== 1987 Racing Season ===
At her home base at Woodbine Racetrack, Carotene won the 1987 Nassau Stakes and was second in the Niagara Handicap and the King Edward Stakes. In the United States, she beat males in the New Hampshire Sweepstakes Handicap at Rockingham Park, won the Matchmaker Handicap at Atlantic City Race Course, and won the Yellow Ribbon Stakes at Santa Anita Park.

Carotene's performances earned her two more Sovereign Awards as the 1987 Canadian Champion Turf Horse and Canadian Champion Older Female Horse.

=== 1988 Racing Season ===
After her 1987 season in Canada, Carotene's handlers sent her south to Florida for the winter racing season, where jockey Don Seymour rode the five-year-old to victory in the 1988 Grade I Pan American Handicap at Gulfstream Park. In that race, she defeated males and did it in a winning time that was one-fifth of a second off the course record.

At home at Woodbine Racetrack, Carotene's best result was a second in the Jockey Club Cup Handicap. In other races in the United States, she ran second in the Santa Barbara Handicap and third in the 1988 San Juan Capistrano, the Matchmaker Handicap and the Sword Dancer Invitational Handicaps. At the end of the 1988 racing season, she was voted her third straight Sovereign Award for Champion Female Turf Horse and her second straight Canadian Champion Older Female Horse.

As a broodmare, Carotene had the first of her eight foals in 1990 and her last in 2003.
