= La Prevoyante Stakes =

- Class: Restricted Stakes
- Location: Woodbine Racetrack; Toronto, Ontario, Canada
- Inaugurated: 1975
- Race type: Thoroughbred - Flat racing
- Website: woodbineentertainment.com

Race information
- Distance: 1 1/16 miles (8.5 furlongs)
- Surface: All-weather track
- Qualification: Three-year-old fillies (Ontario Sire Stakes program)
- Weight: Assigned
- Purse: $125,000

The La Prevoyante Stakes is a thoroughbred horse race run annually in mid December at Woodbine Racetrack in Toronto, Ontario, Canada. An Ontario Sire Stakes, it is a restricted race for three-year-old fillies. It is contested over a distance of one and one-sixteenth miles (8.5 furlongs) on all-weather track and currently carries a purse of $125,000.

Inaugurated in 1975, it was raced at a distance of seven furlongs until 1979 when it was modified to a distance of one mile. Beginning in 2018, it was run at 1 1/16 miles on the all-weather track. For 1977 only, the race was run on dirt and in 1979 it was run in two divisions.

The race was named to honor the Canadian Horse Racing Hall of Fame and U.S. Racing Hall of Fame inductee, La Prevoyante. Owned by Quebec businessman and prominent racing stable owner, Jean-Louis Levesque's, La Prevoyante went undefeated in all twelve of her races in 1972 and was voted U.S. Champion 2-Year-Old Filly and Canadian Horse of the Year. In 1974, she collapsed and died of a ruptured lung following the Miss Florida Handicap at Calder Race Course, which also honored her with its own La Prevoyante Stakes.

== Records ==
Speed record: (Through 1998, Woodbine times were recorded in fifths of a second. Since 1999 they are in hundredths of a second)

- 1:34.68 - Blonde Executive (2004) (at 1 mile)

Most wins by an owner:

- 3 - Gus Schickedanz (1979, 1997, 1998)
- 3 - Sam-Son Farm (1985, 1987, 1991)

Most wins by a jockey:

- 4 - Richard Dos Ramos (1996, 1997, 2000, 2004)
- 4 - Eurico Rosa da Silva (2008, 2009, 2017, 2018)

Most wins by a trainer:

- 3 - Macdonald Benson (1984, 1989, 1993)
- 3 - James E. Day (1985, 1987, 1991)

== Winners ==
| Year | Winner | Jockey | Trainer | Owner | Time |
|---|---|---|---|---|---|
| 2018 | She's the Berries | Eurico Rosa da Silva | Mark Casse | Brereton C. Jones | 1:44.08 |
| 2017 | Silent Sonet | Eurico Rosa da Silva | Nicholas Gonzalez | Ivan Dalos | 1:34.37 |
| 2016 | Shake Down Baby | Alan Garcia | Christophe Clement | Cheyenne Stables, LLC | 1:35.70 |
| 2015 | Conquest Strate Up | Alan Garcia | Mark Casse | Conquest Stables, LLC | 1:35.58 |
| 2014 | Zazinga | Gary Boulanger | Steven Owens | Steven Owens & Beverly Lewis-Owens | 1:33.43 |
| 2013 | Professor's Ride | Michelle Rainford | Scott Fairlie | Hard Eight Stables, Inc. & Ace Racing Stable, Inc. | 1:39.36 |
| 2012 | Nikki's Bold Gelato | David Moran | Robert Tiller | Benjamin Hutzel | 1:41.70 |
| 2011 | Reconnect | Omar Moreno | Ashlee Brnjas | Colebrook Farms | 1:37.69 |
| 2010 | Dancing Raven | Chantal Sutherland | Michael Doyle | Windhaven | 1:36.07 |
| 2009 | Double Malt | Eurico Rosa da Silva | Malcolm Pierce | Mike Ambler & partners | 1:34.35 |
| 2008 | Tenjectory | Eurico Rosa da Silva | Mike De Paulo | T.V. Stables | 1:37.91 |
| 2007 | Siwa | Jono Jones | Kevin Attard | Knob Hill Stable | 1:36.17 |
| 2006 | London Snow | Steve Bahen | John Charalambous | Kirk Bradden Stables | 1:35.93 |
| 2005 | Top Ten List | Corey Fraser | Robert Tiller | Frank DiGiulio, Jr. & Robert Tiller | 1:40.55 |
| 2004 | Blonde Executive | Richard Dos Ramos | Radlie Loney | Bruno Bros. Farms | 1:34.68 |
| 2003 | Miss Crissy | Steve Bahen | Emile Allain | Harlequin Ranches | 1:36.28 |
| 2002 | Heyahohowdy | Shane Ellis | Norm DeSouza | S.V.G.B. Stable | 1:40.59 |
| 2001 | Moonlight Affair | Todd Kabel | Tino Attard | Stronach Stable | 1:36.77 |
| 2000 | Love A Ruckus | Richard Dos Ramos | David R. Bell | R.F. & J.E. Shaw | 1:38.17 |
| 1999 | Princess Alicia | Patrick Husbands | Sid C. Attard | Goldmart Farms | 1:37.94 |
| 1998 | Colorful T | Mickey Walls | Mike Keogh | Gus Schickedanz | 1:35.40 |
| 1997 | Silver Taler | Richard Dos Ramos | Mike Keogh | Gus Schickedanz | 1:35.40 |
| 1996 | Gambling Girl | Richard Dos Ramos | David R. Bell | Colleen Dalos | 1:35.80 |
| 1995 | Duchess Zea | Laurie Gulas | Roger Attfield | Anderson Farms et al. | 1:37.20 |
| 1994 | Plenty of Sugar | Robert Landry | Roger Attfield | Kinghaven Farm et al. | 1:34.80 |
| 1993 | Far Too Loud | Mickey Walls | Macdonald Benson | Summerhill Farms | 1:38.80 |
| 1992 | Victorious Lil | Sandy Hawley | Erika Winkelmann | Ivan Dalos | 1:35.60 |
| 1991 | Quiet Cleo | James McKnight | James E. Day | Sam-Son Farm | 1:35.80 |
| 1990 | Rose of Lancaster | Ray Sabourin | Lou Cavalaris, Jr. | Gardiner Farms | 1:40.20 |
| 1989 | Tarage | Sandy Hawley | Macdonald Benson | Anderson Farms et al. | 1:35.60 |
| 1988 | Regal Passer | Jack Lauzon | John Cirillo | C. E. Simmons | 1:38.00 |
| 1987 | Hangin On A Star | Dave Penna | James E. Day | Sam-Son Farm | 1:36.40 |
| 1986 | Cuantalamera | Dan Beckon | Gil Robillard | B. C. Stable | 1:43.40 |
| 1985 | In My Cap | Jeffrey Fell | James E. Day | Sam-Son Farm | 1:37.20 |
| 1984 | Bounding Away | David Clark | Macdonald Benson | Windfields Farm | 1:35.60 |
| 1983 | Lady Ice | Gary Stahlbaum | Michael J. Doyle | S. Simard | 1:36.80 |
| 1982 | Snowy Dancer | Robin Platts | Jacques Dumas | Meadowood Stable | 1:40.80 |
| 1981 | Eternal Search | Brian Swatuk | Ted Mann | Jim Dandy Stable | 1:38.00 |
| 1980 | Cranareen | Jim Fazio | Paul J. Buttigieg | S. Rovet | 1:37.40 |
| 1979 | Victorious Answer | Robin Platts | John Morahan | Gus Schickedanz | 1:36.80 |
| 1979 | Good Decree | Lloyd Duffy | Frank Huarte | Frank Huarte | 1:37.20 |
| 1978 | Satania | Robin Platts | John Morahan | Doug Banks | 1:28.60 |
| 1977 | Ms. Dolly A. | Gary Stahlbaum | Gerry Belanger | Edward B. Seedhouse | 1:27.20 |
| 1976 | Regal Gal | Earlie Fires | Chris W. Voyce | Edward A. Cox, Jr. | 1:26.00 |
| 1975 | Reasonable Win | John LeBlanc | Fred H. Loschke | Hammer Kopf Farm | 1:23.20 |
