= Rainbows for Life =

Canadian-bred Thoroughbred racehorse

Rainbows For Life
- Sire: Lyphard
- Grandsire: Northern Dancer
- Dam: Rainbow Connection
- Damsire: Halo
- Sex: Stallion
- Foaled: 1988
- Country: Canada
- Colour: Chestnut
- Breeder: Sam-Son Farm
- Owner: Sam-Son Farm
- Trainer: James E. Day
- Record: 36: 15-7-7
- Earnings: Can$1,105,926

Major wins
- Coronation Futurity Stakes (1990); Cup and Saucer Stakes (1990); Summer Stakes (1990); Hawthorne Derby (1991); Toronto Cup Stakes (1991); Fair Grounds Handicap (1992); Riggs Handicap (1992); Dominion Day Stakes (1992); New Hampshire Sweepstakes Handicap (1992); Connaught Cup Stakes (1993)

Awards
- Canadian Champion 2-Year-Old Colt (1990); Canadian Champion Male Turf Horse (1992); Canadian Champion Older Male Horse (1992); Leading sire in Slovakia (1999); Leading sire in the Czech Republic (1999, 2004, 2005, 2006)

Rainbows For Life (May 17, 1988 – September 1, 2012) was a Canadian Thoroughbred racehorse. Bred and raced by Sam-Son Farm, he was trained by Olympic Gold Medalist and Canadian Horse Racing Hall of Fame inductee, Jim Day.

A multiple Graded stakes race winner who competed successfully on both grass and dirt, Rainbows For Life won three Sovereign Awards for racing.

== At stud ==
Sold to Czech Republic breeders, Rainbows For Life was the Leading sire in the Czech Republic in 1999, 2004, 2005, 2006, and the Leading sire in Slovakia in 1999. He also stood at stud in Australia, but with limited success.

Rainbows for Life was euthanized in the Czech Republic on September 1, 2012, due to the infirmities of old age.
