= Canadian Champion Two-Year-Old Colt =

The Canadian Champion Two-Year-Old Colt is a Canadian Thoroughbred horse racing honour. Created in 1975 by the Jockey Club of Canada, it is part of the Sovereign Awards program and is awarded annually to the top 2-Year-Old male Thoroughbred horse competing in Canada.

== Past winners ==
- 1975 : Proud Tobin
- 1976 : Sound Reason
- 1977 : Overskate
- 1978 : Medaille d'Or
- 1979 : Allan Blue
- 1980 : Bayford
- 1981 : Deputy Minister
- 1982 : Sunny's Halo
- 1983 : Prince Avatar
- 1984 : Dauphin Fabuleux
- 1985 : Grey Classic
- 1986 : Blue Finn
- 1987 : Regal Classic
- 1988 : Mercedes Won
- 1989 : Sky Classic
- 1990 : Rainbows For Life
- 1991 : Free at Last
- 1992 : Truth of It All
- 1993 : Comet Shine
- 1994 : Talkin Man
- 1995 : Gomtuu
- 1996 : Cash Deposit
- 1997 : Dawson's Legacy
- 1998 : Riddell's Creek
- 1999 : Exciting Story
- 2000 : Highland Legacy
- 2001 : Rare Friends
- 2002 : Added Edge
- 2003 : Judiths Wild Rush
- 2004 : Wholelottabourbon
- 2005 : Edenwold
- 2006 : Leonnatus Anteas
- 2007 : Kodiak Kowboy
- 2008 : Mine That Bird
- 2009 : Hollinger
- 2010 : Madman Diaries
- 2011 : Maritimer
- 2012 : Uncaptured
- 2013 : Go Greeley
- 2014 : Conquest Typhoon
- 2015 : Riker
- 2016 : King and His Court
- 2017 : Admiralty Pier
- 2018 : Avie’s Flatter
- 2019 : Mr. Hustle
- 2020 : Gretzky The Great
- 2021 : God of Love
- 2022 : Philip My Dear
- 2023 : My Boy Prince
- 2024 : He’s Not Joking
