= Saoirse (horse) =

Canadian-bred Thoroughbred racehorse

- Sire: Cure the Blues
- Grandsire: Stop The Music
- Dam: Apelia
- Damsire: Cool Victor
- Sex: Mare
- Foaled: 1996
- Country: Canada
- Colour: Bay
- Breeder: Knob Hill Stable
- Owner: Knob Hill Stable
- Trainer: Phil England; Paul J. McGee (9/16/2002)
- Record: 18: 8-2-2
- Earnings: $502,721

Major wins
- La Voyageuse Stakes (2000); George C. Hendrie Stakes (2000); Chicago Breeders' Cup Handicap (2000); Seaway Stakes (2000)

Awards
- Canadian Champion Older Female Horse (2000)
- Last updated on February 15, 2010

Saoirse (foaled 1996 in Ontario) is a Canadian Champion Thoroughbred racehorse.

== Background ==
Bred and raced by Steve Stavro's Knob Hill Stable, her Gaelic name means "freedom, Liberty or Holiday" (though there is no official direct translation of the name) and is pronounced "Seer sha"

Saoirse was sired by 1980 Laurel Futurity Stakes winner, Cure the Blues. Her dam was Apelia, the 1993 Canadian Champion Sprint Horse who won the award at a time when it was a single honor for horses of either sex.

She was trained by Phil England from a base at Woodbine Racetrack in Toronto,

== Racing career ==
Saoirse did not race at age two. On April 10, 1999, the then three-year-old filly made an impressive racing debut at Woodbine with an 18¾ length win in a maiden race for three and four-year-old fillies. During the remainder of the year, Saoirse's best stakes result racing at age three was a second in the Jammed Lovely Stakes but on October 16 she won a race in which she equaled the Woodbine track record for 6.5 furlongs with a clocking of 1:14:78

Racing at age four in 2000, Saoirse won Woodbine's La Voyageuse Stakes and George C. Hendrie Stakes then in June raced in the United States for the first time. She made her American debut at Arlington Park in Chicago with a win in the Chicago Breeders' Cup Handicap. . Her next win came in early September in the Seaway Stakes at Woodbine shortly after which owner Steve Stavro announced he was closing down his racing operations and would be selling off his horses. On September 16, Saoirse was sold to a partnership of William Butler, William Steiden and Doninga Farm, owned by Ginger and David L. Mullins. Her new owners transferred the four-year-old filly to trainer Paul McGee. For her new handlers, Saoirse made five starts without a win but her performances for the year 2000 were still enough for her to be voted Canadian Champion Older Female Horse honors.

After running unplaced in an allowance race at Keeneland on April 13, 2001, five-year-old Saoirse was retired from racing and sent to broodmare duty at Doninga Farm near Lexington, Kentucky. In foal to Seeking The Gold, Saoirse was sold at the 2001 Keeneland November breeding stock sale for US$2.2 million. Between 2003 and 2005, Saoirse had four foals, all fillies. The first was the multiple stakes winner Hide And Chic by Seeking The Gold. She was followed by matings to Storm Cat that produced Saoirse Cat, to A.P. Indy that produced Autobahn Girl, and to El Prado that produced El Saoirse.

== Broodmare ==
Saoirse's descendants include:

c = colt, f = filly

Foaled	Name	Sex	Major Wins
2002	Hide and Chic	f	Seaway Stakes, Royal North Stakes
