= Seaside Retreat =

American-bred Thoroughbred racehorse

- Sire: King Cugat
- Grandsire: Kingmambo
- Dam: She's Like Rio
- Damsire: Boundary
- Sex: Stallion
- Foaled: 2003
- Country: United States
- Colour: Bay
- Breeder: Centennial Farms
- Owner: William S. Farish III
- Trainer: Mark E. Casse
- Record: 21: 7-4-3
- Earnings: US$1,044,840

Major wins
- Display Stakes (2005); Charlie Barley Stakes (2006); Nijinsky Stakes (2008)
- Last updated on May 19, 2010

Seaside Retreat (foaled May 1, 2003 in Kentucky) is a Thoroughbred racehorse who competed in Canada and the United States from a base at Woodbine Racetrack in Toronto, Ontario. As a foal of 2003, he was a possible contender for the U.S. Triple Crown in 2006 and finished tenth in the Kentucky Derby.

== Connections ==
Seaside Retreat is owned by William S. Farish III and trained by Mark Casse. He's often ridden by Patrick Husbands. Bred by Centennial Farms, his sire is King Cugat, and his dam is She's Like Rio by Boundary.

In 2008, Seaside Retreat set a new Woodbine course record for a mile and a quarter on turf in winning the Nijinsky Stakes.
