= Thornfield =

Canadian-bred Thoroughbred racehorse

- Sire: Sky Classic
- Grandsire: Nijinsky
- Dam: Alexandrina
- Damsire: Conquistador Cielo
- Sex: Gelding
- Foaled: 1994
- Country: Canada
- Colour: Chestnut
- Breeder: Knob Hill Stable
- Owner: Knob Hill Stable
- Trainer: Phil England
- Record: 19: 6-1-3
- Earnings: Can$1,206,074

Major wins
- Canadian International Stakes (1999); Niagara Breeders' Cup Handicap (1999)

Awards
- Canadian Horse of the Year (1999); Canadian Champion Male Turf Horse (1999)

Thornfield (foaled 1994 in Ontario) is a Canadian Thoroughbred Champion racehorse.

== Background ==
Thornfield was bred by Steve Stavro's Knob Hill Farm, he was sired by Eclipse and Sovereign Award and Canadian Horse Racing Hall of Fame inductee Sky Classic, a son of the English Triple Crown winner, Nijinsky. Thornfield's dam was Alexandrina, a daughter of 1982 American Horse of the Year, Conquistador Cielo.

== Racing career ==
In 1999, under trainer Phil England, five-year-old Thornfield won the Grade 2 Niagara Breeders' Cup Handicap. Ridden by Richard Dos Ramos, they then won the $1.5 million Canadian International as the longest shot in the field. The win made Thornfield the first winner sired by an International winner. His 1999 performances earned him Canadian Horse of the Year and Canadian Champion Male Turf Horse honours.

== Retirement ==
Retired from racing, the gelding Thornfield now resides at the branch of Old Friends Equine at Kentucky Downs in Franklin, Kentucky.

== Pedigree ==
Pedigree of Thornfield
Sire Sky Classic	Nijinsky	Northern Dancer	Nearctic
Sire Sky Classic	Nijinsky	Northern Dancer	Natalma
Sire Sky Classic	Nijinsky	Flaming Page	Bull Page
Sire Sky Classic	Nijinsky	Flaming Page	Flaring Top
Sire Sky Classic	No Class	Nodouble	Noholme
Sire Sky Classic	No Class	Nodouble	Abla-Jay
Sire Sky Classic	No Class	Classy Quillo	Outing Class
Sire Sky Classic	No Class	Classy Quillo	Quillopoly
Dam Alexandrina	Conquistador Cielo	Mr. Prospector	Raise a Native
Dam Alexandrina	Conquistador Cielo	Mr. Prospector	Gold Digger
Dam Alexandrina	Conquistador Cielo	K. D. Princess	Bold Commander
Dam Alexandrina	Conquistador Cielo	K. D. Princess	Tammy's Turn
Dam Alexandrina	La Lorgnette	Val de l'Orne	Val de Loir
Dam Alexandrina	La Lorgnette	Val de l'Orne	Aglae
Dam Alexandrina	La Lorgnette	The Temptress	Nijinsky
Dam Alexandrina	La Lorgnette	The Temptress	La Sevillana
