= Archers Bay =

Canadian-bred Thoroughbred racehorse

- Sire: Silver Deputy
- Grandsire: Deputy Minister
- Dam: Adorned
- Damsire: Val de l'Orne
- Sex: Stallion
- Foaled: 1995
- Country: Canada
- Colour: Brown
- Breeder: Windfields Farm
- Owner: Eugene Melnyk & Iris Bristow
- Trainer: Todd A. Pletcher
- Record: 13: 4-3-2
- Earnings: US$666,200

Major wins
- Canadian Triple Crown wins: Queen's Plate (1998); Prince of Wales Stakes (1998)

Awards
- Canadian Champion Three-Year-Old Male Horse (1998)
- Last updated on June 22, 2011

Archers Bay (1995–2002) was a Canadian Thoroughbred racehorse known for winning the first two legs of the 1998 Canadian Triple Crown. He was sired by Silver Deputy and out of the stakes-winning mare, Adorned, a daughter of the 1975 French Derby winner, Val de l'Orne.

In the 1998 Canadian Triple Crown series, Archers Bay won the Queen's Plate and the Prince of Wales Stakes but did not run in the final leg as the Breeders Stakes is a test on turf. He was voted Canadian Champion Three-Year-Old Male Horse.

Retired to stud duty, Archers Bay sired Arch Hall and other foals.

The stallion was humanely euthanized in 2002 after an unsuccessful colic surgery and is buried on his farm.
