= Royal North Stakes =

- Class: Grade II
- Location: Woodbine Racetrack; Toronto, Ontario Canada
- Inaugurated: 1989
- Race type: Thoroughbred - Flat racing
- Website: woodbineentertainment.com

Race information
- Distance: 6.5 furlongs
- Surface: Turf
- Track: Left-handed
- Qualification: Fillies & Mares, three-years-old & up
- Weight: Allowances
- Purse: $175,000 (2021)

The Royal North Stakes is a Canadian Thoroughbred horse race run annually since 1989 at Woodbine Racetrack in Toronto, Ontario. Held in July or early August, the Grade II sprint race is open to fillies and mares aged three and older and is run over a distance of six and a half furlongs on turf. It currently offers a purse of $115,065.

Inaugurated in 1989 as the Royal North Handicap, it was run as a six furlong race on dirt until 1996 when it was switched to Woodbine Racetrack's E. P. Taylor turf course. In 2018, this race is upgraded from Grade III to Grade II. The race was downgraded to Grade III in 2024.

== Records ==
Speed record: (Through 1998, times were recorded in fifths of a second. Since 1999 they are in hundredths of a second)

- 1:07.39 - Ageless (2014) (at previous distance of 6 furlongs)
- 1:13.55 - Boardroom (2022) (at current distance of 6.5 furlongs)

Most wins:

- 2 - Confessional (2000, 2001)

Most wins by an owner:

- 2 - Knob Hill Stable (1993, 2003)
- 2 - Frank Stronach and/or Stronach Stables (1995, 2004)
- 2 - Pin Oak Stable (2000, 2001)
- 2 - Live Oak Plantation (2006, 2023)
- 2 - Lael Stables (2014, 2015)

Most wins by a jockey:

- 5 - Patrick Husbands (1998, 2012, 2017, 2023, 2024)

Most wins by a trainer:

- 6 - Mark E. Casse (2012, 2017, 2020, 2023, 2024, 2026)

== Winners ==
Year	Winner	Age	Jockey	Trainer	Owner	Time
2026	Shifty	4	Rafael Manuel Hernandez	Mark E. Casse	D. J. Stable	1:29.08
2025	Ms. Tart	4	Huber Villa-Gomez	Kevin Rice	Nathan McCauley	1:15.56
2024	Play the Music	4	Patrick Husbands	Mark E. Casse	Glassman Racing LLC	1:14.85
2023	Our Flash Drive	5	Patrick Husbands	Mark E. Casse	Live Oak Plantation	1:13.88
2022	Boardroom	5	Rafael Manuel Hernandez	Josie Carroll	LNJ Foxwoods	1:13.55
2021	Amalfi Coast	5	Justin Stein	Kevin Attard	Terra Racing Stable	1:09.15
2020	Lady Grace	4	Kazushi Kimura	Mark E. Casse	Tracy Farmer	1:06.90
2019	Summer Sunday	4	Rafael Manuel Hernandez	Stuart Simon	Anne & William Scott	1:08.26
2018	Way To Versailles	4	Eurico Rosa Da Silva	Kevin Attard	Mahamoud Pootoolal	1:08.00
2017	Jennifer Lynnette	4	Patrick Husbands	Mark E. Casse	Conrad Farms	1:08.17
2016	Lady Shipman	4	Jesse M. Campbell	Kiaran P. McLaughlin	Ranlo Investments	1:07.70
2015	Ageless	6	Julien Leparoux	Arnaud Delacour	Lael Stables	1:07.17
2014	Ageless	5	Luis Garcia	Arnaud Delacour	Lael Stables	1:07.39
2013	Nikkis Smartypants	4	Eurico Rosa Da Silva	Robert P. Tiller	Benjamin Hutzel	1:09.49
2012	Roxy Gap	4	Patrick Husbands	Mark E. Casse	Melnyk Racing Stables	1:09.18
2011	Jenny's So Great	4	Jesse Campbell	Gregory De Gannes	Bill and Vicki Poston	1:08.76
2010	Unzip Me	4	Joe Talamo	Martin F. Jones	Harris Farms Inc., Valpredo et al.	1:08.05
2009	Glitter Rox	5	Gerry Olguin	Ian Black	Ellie-Boje Farm et al.	1:09.03
2008	Akronism	4	Eurico Rosa Da Silva	Timothy Ritchey	Robert S. Evans	1:07.88
2007	Vestrey Lady	4	Emile Ramsammy	Reade Baker	Harlequin Ranches	1:09.17
2006	Hide And Chic	4	David Clark	Malcolm Pierce	Live Oak Plantation	1:08.69
2005	Taras Touch	6	Robert Landry	Niall O'Callaghan	Team Valor/Margaux Farm	1:09.79
2004	Hour of Justice	4	Todd Kabel	Mike Keogh	Stronach Stables	1:07.83
2003	Chopinina	5	Todd Kabel	Alec Fehr	Knob Hill Stable	1:12.19
2002	Quick Blue	4	Emile Ramsammy	Linda L. Rice	Joseph LaCombe	1:09.53
2001	Confessional	5	Ramon Dominguez	H. Graham Motion	Pin Oak Stable	1:09.10
2000	Confessional	4	Ramon Dominguez	H. Graham Motion	Pin Oak Stable	1:08.35
1999	Hide The Bride	4	Mickey Walls	Joe Walls	Shelter Valley Farms	1:10.61
1998	Going to Extremes	4	Patrick Husbands	Thomas Patton	Frejlich, Beer/C. & A. Patton	1:09.00
1997	Domasca Bella	5	David Clark	Robert P. Tiller	Frank DiGiulio, Sr. & Jr.	1:09.40
1996	Special Moves	4	Victor Molina	Eugene Weymouth	William S. Farish III	1:09.40
1995	Bar U Mood	5	Todd Kabel	Daniel J. Vella	Frank Stronach	1:10.40
1994	Early Blaze	4	Lloyd Duffy	Brian Ottaway	Ken Ham	1:10.40
1993	Apelia	4	Larry Attard	Phil England	Knob Hill Stable	1:09.20
1992	Meafara	3	Brian Swatuk	Leslie Ahrens	Frank L. Muench	1:09.40
1991	Premier Question	4	Richard Dos Ramos	David R. Bell	John A. Franks	1:10.80
1990	Petite Duchess	4	Ray Sabourin	Robert P. Tiller	Lerner/Taylor/Anderson	1:10.20
1989	Blushing Katy	3	Gunnar Lindberg	Phil England	Kingsbrook Farm	1:09.80

== See also ==
- List of Canadian flat horse races
