= Canadian Champion Male Turf Horse =

Award for thoroughbred horses in Canada

The Canadian Champion Male Turf Horse is a Canadian Thoroughbred horse racing honour that is part of the Sovereign Awards program awarded annually to the top male Thoroughbred turf horse competing in Canada. Created in 1975 by the Jockey Club of Canada as a single award for Champion Turf Horse, it was split into male and female categories in 1995.

== Past winners ==
- 1975 : Victorian Queen (filly)
- 1976 : Victorian Prince
- 1977 : Momigi (mare)
- 1978 : Overskate
- 1979 : Overskate
- 1980 : Overskate
- 1981 : Ben Fab
- 1982 : Frost King
- 1983 : Kingsbridge
- 1984 : Bounding Away
- 1985 : Imperial Choice
- 1986 : Carotene
- 1987 : Carotene
- 1988 : Carotene
- 1989 : Charlie Barley
- 1990 : Izvestia
- 1991 : Sky Classic
- 1992 : Rainbows For Life
- 1993 : Hero's Love
- 1994 : Alywow
- 1995 : Hasten To Add
- 1996 : Chief Bearhart
- 1997 : Chief Bearhart
- 1998 : Chief Bearhart
- 1999 : Thornfield
- 2000 : Quiet Resolve
- 2001 : Numerous Times
- 2002 : Portcullis
- 2003 : Perfect Soul
- 2004 : Soaring Free
- 2005 : A Bit O'Gold
- 2006 : Sky Conqueror
- 2007 : Cloudy's Knight
- 2008 : Rahy's Attorney
- 2009 : Champs Elysees
- 2010 : Grand Adventure
- 2011 : Musketier
- 2012 : Riding the River
- 2013 : Forte Dei Marmi
- 2014 : Dynamic Sky
- 2015 : Interpol
- 2016 : Conquest Enforcer
- 2017 : Johnny Bear
- 2018 : Mr Havercamp
- 2019 : El Tormenta
- 2020 : Say The Word
- 2021 : Town Cruise
- 2022 : Filo Di Arianna (BRZ)
- 2023 : Lucky Score
- 2024 : Filo Di Arianna (BRZ)
