= True Metropolitan =

American-bred Thoroughbred racehorse

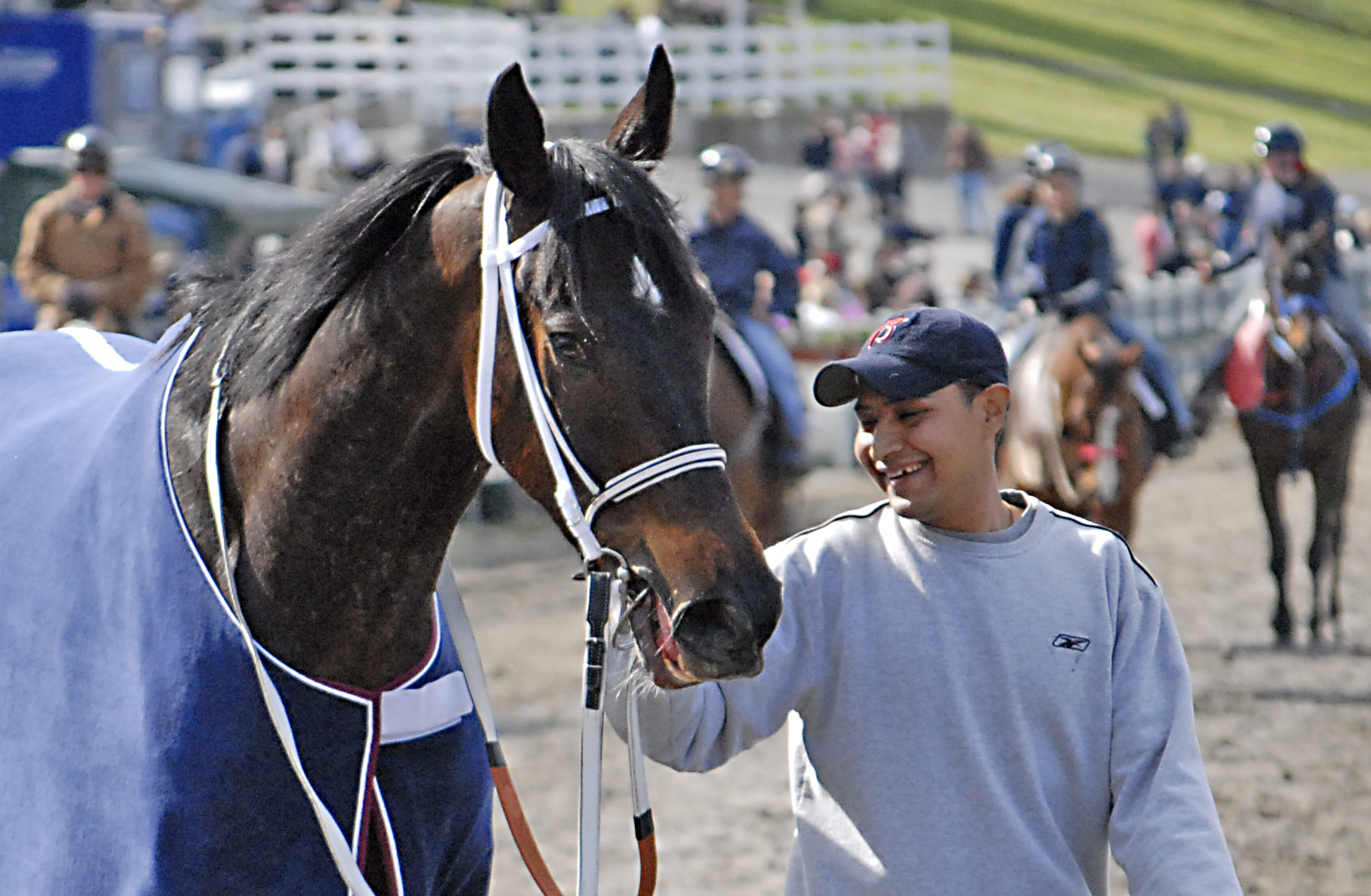
- Sire: Proud And True
- Grandsire: Mr. Prospector
- Dam: Forest Dunes
- Damsire: Green Forest
- Sex: Gelding
- Foaled: 2002
- Country: United States
- Colour: Dark Bay
- Breeder: Frank Bertolino
- Owner: Bahadur Cheema
- Trainer: Terry Jordan
- Record: 35: 18-5-4
- Earnings: $1 million +

Major wins
- Autumn Stakes (2006, 2007); Dominion Day Stakes (2007); Eclipse Stakes (2008)

Awards
- Canadian Champion Older Male Horse (2006, 2007)
- Last updated on July 6, 2008

True Metropolitan (foaled April 2, 2002, in Florida) is a Thoroughbred racehorse who has been voted Canada's Champion Older Male Horse in 2006 and 2007.

A gelding trained by Terry Jordan, True Metropolitan has won races at Toronto's Woodbine Racetrack and in the Western Canada at Northlands and Stampede Parks in Alberta and at Hastings Racecourse in Vancouver, British Columbia.

In June 2008, True Metropolitan surpassed the $1million mark in career earnings after winning the Eclipse Stakes.
