= Canadian Champion Older Male Horse =

Canadian Thoroughbred horse racing honour

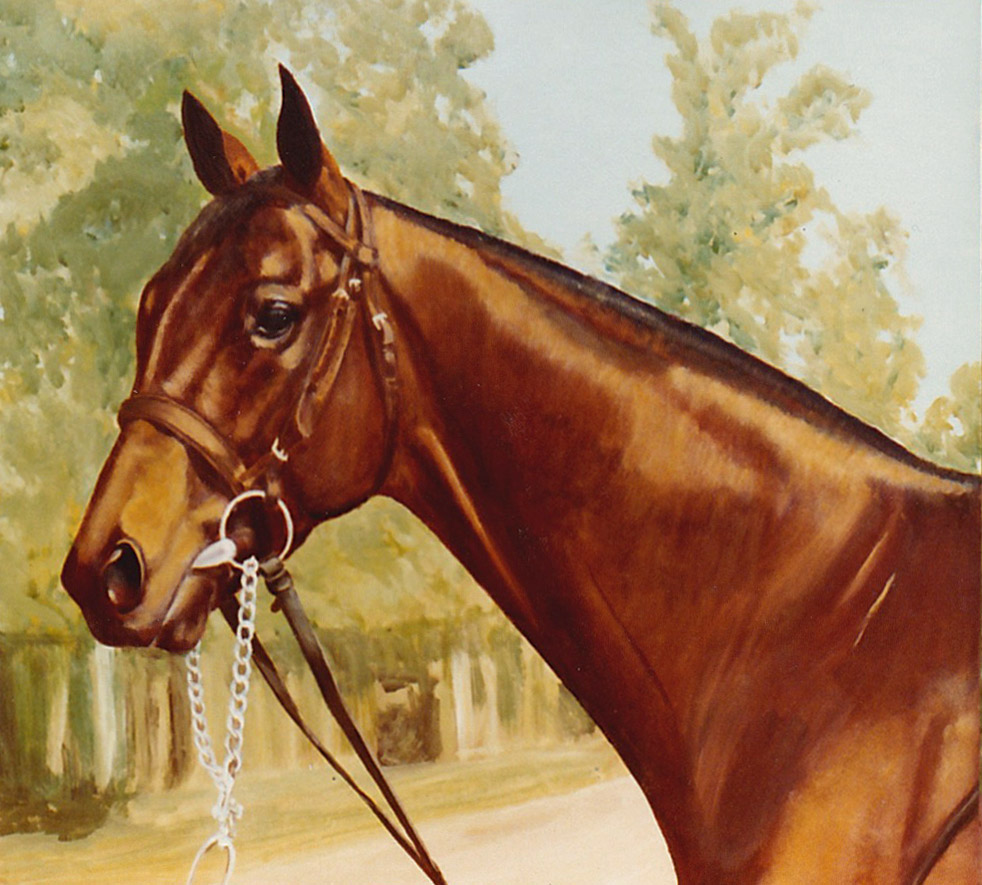
Norcliffe, painted by Bob Demuyser (1920–2003)

The Canadian Champion Older Male Horse is a Canadian Thoroughbred horse racing honour. Created in 1975 by the Jockey Club of Canada, it is part of the Sovereign Awards program and is awarded annually to the top horse four years or older competing in Canada. The award was renamed to Champion Older Main Track Male before the 2019 Sovereign Awards.

== Past winners ==
- 2024 : Paramount Prince
- 2023 : Tyson
- 2022 : Who’s the Star
- 2021 : Mighty Heart
- 2020 : Skywire
- 2019 : Pink Lloyd
- 2018 : Mr Havercamp
- 2017 : Pink Lloyd
- 2016 : Are You Kidding Me
- 2015 : Are You Kidding Me
- 2014 : Lukes Alley
- 2013 : Alpha Bettor
- 2012 : Hunters Bay
- 2011 : Fifty Proof
- 2010 : Sand Cove
- 2009 : Marchfield
- 2008 : Marchfield
- 2007 : True Metropolitan
- 2006 : True Metropolitan
- 2005 : A Bit O'Gold
- 2004 : Mobil
- 2003 : Phantom Light
- 2002 : Wake at Noon
- 2001 : A Fleets Dancer
- 2000 : One Way Love
- 1999 : Deputy Inxs
- 1998 : Terremoto
- 1997 : Chief Bearhart
- 1996 : Mt. Sassafras
- 1995 : Basqueian
- 1994 : King Ruckus
- 1993 : Cozzene's Prince
- 1992 : Rainbows For Life
- 1991 : Sky Classic
- 1990 : Twist the Snow
- 1989 : Steady Power
- 1988 : Play the King
- 1987 : Play the King
- 1986 : Let's Go Blue
- 1985 : Ten Gold Pots
- 1984 : Canadian Factor
- 1983 : Travelling Victor
- 1982 : Frost King
- 1981 : Driving Home
- 1980 : Overskate
- 1979 : Overskate
- 1978 : Giboulee
- 1977 : Norcliffe
- 1976 : Victorian Prince
- 1975 : Rash Move
