= Regal Classic =

Canadian-bred Thoroughbred racehorse

- Sire: Vice Regent
- Grandsire: Northern Dancer
- Dam: No Class
- Damsire: Nodouble
- Sex: Stallion
- Foaled: March 28, 1985
- Died: April 5, 2012 (aged 27)
- Country: Canada
- Colour: Chestnut
- Breeder: Sam-Son Farm
- Owner: Sam-Son Farm & Windfields Farm
- Trainer: James E. Day
- Record: 27: 8-8-3
- Earnings: $1,456,584

Major wins
- Grey Stakes (1987); Summer Stakes (1987); Cup and Saucer Stakes (1987); Grey Stakes (1987); Coronation Futurity (1987); Marine Stakes (1988); Plate Trial Stakes (1988); Eclipse Stakes (1989) Canadian Classic Race wins: Prince of Wales Stakes (1988)

Awards
- Canadian Champion 2-Yr-Old-Colt (1987)

Regal Classic (March 28, 1985 - April 5, 2012) was a Canadian Thoroughbred racehorse. In 1987, he earned the Sovereign Award for Champion 2-Year-Old Colt after winning the Summer Stakes, Cup and Saucer, Grey Stakes and Coronation Futurity, plus finishing second in the Breeders' Cup Juvenile. At age three, he started his campaign on the American Triple Crown trail, where he finished fifth in the Kentucky Derby and sixth in the Preakness. He then returned to Canada where he finished second in the Queen's Plate and won the Prince of Wales, the second leg of the Canadian Triple Crown.

== Background ==
Bred by Sam-Son Farm, he was by the highly successful sire Vice Regent and out of Sam-Son Farm's foundation mare No Class. In addition to Regal Classic, No Class produced champions Classy 'n' Smart, Grey Classic and Sky Classic. He was raced in partnership with Vice Regent's owner, Windfields Farm.

== Champion Two-Year-Old season ==
Regal Classic was trained by Olympic Games equestrian Gold Medalist and Canadian Horse Racing Hall of Fame inductee Jim Day. Racing at age two, He won every major stakes race for his age group. Sent to California for the 1987 Breeders' Cup Juvenile at Hollywood Park Racetrack, Regal Classic was in 11th place after a quarter mile, then moved up to seventh at the half before getting boxed in on the far turn. Under jockey Dave Penna, the colt made it through on the inside rail and came on with a strong stretch drive to pass race favorite Tejano and finish second to winner Success Express. His performances in 1987 earned Regal Classic the Sovereign Award as Canadian Champion 2-Yr-Old-Colt.

== At Three ==
Regal Classic's arch rival was another Sam-Son Farm colt sired by Vice Regent named Regal Intention. Regal Classic had defeated him at age two in winning the important Coronation Futurity Stakes and in 1988, the three-year-old Regal Classic beat him again in the Prince of Wales Stakes and the Marine Stakes.

Sent south to compete in the United States Triple Crown series, Regal Classic ran third in the Blue Grass Stakes prep, fifth in the Kentucky Derby, and sixth in the Preakness Stakes. He returned to Canada for the Canadian Triple Crown and won the Plate Trial Stakes prep, then finished second to Regal Intention in Canada's most prestigious race, the Queen's Plate. The two reversed positions in the Prince of Wales Stakes with Regal Classic earning the win. In the fall of 1988, Regal Classic finished second to Ballindaggin in the Molson Export Challenge Stakes.

Regal Classic returned to racing at age four in 1989. His best results were a win in the Eclipse Handicap at Woodbine in Toronto and a second in the Ben Ali Handicap at Keeneland Race Course in Kentucky.

== Stud Duties ==
Retired to stud duty, Regal Classic sired stakes winners Inish Glora, One Way Love, Classic Stamp, and Canadian Classic winners Regal Discovery and Stephanotis, as well as Australian millionaire runner Regal Roller. After standing at McMahon of Saratoga Thoroughbreds, LLC in Saratoga Springs, New York, for several years, he was pensioned after the 2007 season.

== Death ==
In early April 2012, he began experiencing colic symptoms that led to a vet emergency visit. The exam performed by the veterinarian indicated a large pulsing mass in the rectal area, and the ultrasound revealed bleeding. The determination made was that he could no longer be saved from extreme pain and suffering given his age and the malignant growth so he was humanely euthanized.

== Pedigree ==
Pedigree of Regal Classic, chestnut colt, March 28, 1985
Sire Vice Regent 1967	Northern Dancer; 1961	Nearctic	Nearco (ITY)
Sire Vice Regent 1967	Northern Dancer; 1961	Nearctic	*Lady Angela
Sire Vice Regent 1967	Northern Dancer; 1961	Natalma	Native Dancer
Sire Vice Regent 1967	Northern Dancer; 1961	Natalma	Almahmoud
Sire Vice Regent 1967	Victoria Regina; 1958	*Menetrier	Fair Copy (GB)
Sire Vice Regent 1967	Victoria Regina; 1958	*Menetrier	La Melodie (GB)
Sire Vice Regent 1967	Victoria Regina; 1958	Victoriana	Windfields
Sire Vice Regent 1967	Victoria Regina; 1958	Victoriana	Iribelle
Dam No Class 1974	Nodouble; 1965	*Noholme II	Star Kingdom (IRE)
Dam No Class 1974	Nodouble; 1965	*Noholme II	Oceana
Dam No Class 1974	Nodouble; 1965	Abla-jay	Double Jay
Dam No Class 1974	Nodouble; 1965	Abla-jay	Ablamucha
Dam No Class 1974	Classy Quillo; 1969	Outing Class	*Nasrullah
Dam No Class 1974	Classy Quillo; 1969	Outing Class	Track Medal
Dam No Class 1974	Classy Quillo; 1969	Quillopoly	*Princequillo
Dam No Class 1974	Classy Quillo; 1969	Quillopoly	Tonga (family: 23-b)

An asterisk before a name means the horse was imported into North America
