= Sky Classic =

Canadian-bred Thoroughbred racehorse

- Sire: Nijinsky II
- Grandsire: Northern Dancer
- Dam: No Class
- Damsire: Nodouble
- Sex: Stallion
- Foaled: March 17, 1987
- Country: Canada
- Colour: Chestnut
- Breeder: Sam-Son Farm
- Owner: Sam-Son Farm
- Trainer: James E. Day
- Record: 29: 15-6-1
- Earnings: $3,320,398

Major wins
- Grey Stakes (1989); Cup and Saucer Stakes (1989); Summer Stakes (1989); King Edward Gold Cup (1991); Rothmans International (1991); Canadian Maturity Stakes (1991); Connaught Cup Stakes (1991); Dixie Stakes (1991); Manhattan Handicap (1992); Turf Classic Invitational (1992); Arlington Handicap (1992); Caesars International (1992)

Awards
- Canadian Champion 2-Yr-Old Colt (1989); Canadian Champion Male Turf Horse (1991); Canadian Champion Older Male Horse (1991); U.S. Champion Male Turf Horse (1992)

Honours
- Canadian Horse Racing Hall of Fame (1998); Sky Classic Stakes at Woodbine Racetrack

Sky Classic (March 17, 1987 – April 30, 2015) was a Canadian Thoroughbred Hall of Fame racehorse. A son of U.K. Triple Crown champion Nijinsky, in 1989 Sky Classic won the Sovereign Award for Champion 2-Year-Old Male Horse in Canada but injuries kept him out for most of the 1990 racing season.

Back racing on grass in 1991, Sky Classic won six of his nine starts including the prestigious Rothmans International in course record time. The following year with Pat Day riding, he set a new race record in the Arlington Handicap, defeated Fraise in the Turf Classic Invitational at Belmont Park, but lost his two biggest races that year, a second in the Arlington Million to Dear Doctor, and another second by a nose to Fraise in the Breeders' Cup Turf. However, his five other wins that year earned him the 1992 United States Eclipse Award for Outstanding Male Turf Horse.

Retired in 1993, Sky Classic stood stud at Pin Oak Stud, LLC in Versailles, Kentucky. He has sired more than 50 Graded stakes race winners including:

- Thornfield (b. 1994) - 1999 Canadian Horse of the Year
- Nothing To Lose (b. 2000) - Multiple stakes winner including the G1 Turf Mile Stakes
- Sky Conqueror (b. 2002) - Canadian Champion Male Turf Horse (2006) Grade 1 winner in U.S., career earnings $1,720,699
- Hyperbaric (b. 2003) - won G1 Citation Handicap, G2 Oak Tree Mile Stakes

Sky Classic was inducted in the Canadian Horse Racing Hall of Fame in 1998. He died in his paddock an Pin Oak on 30 April 2015.
