= Prince of Wales Stakes =

Canadian Thoroughbred horse race

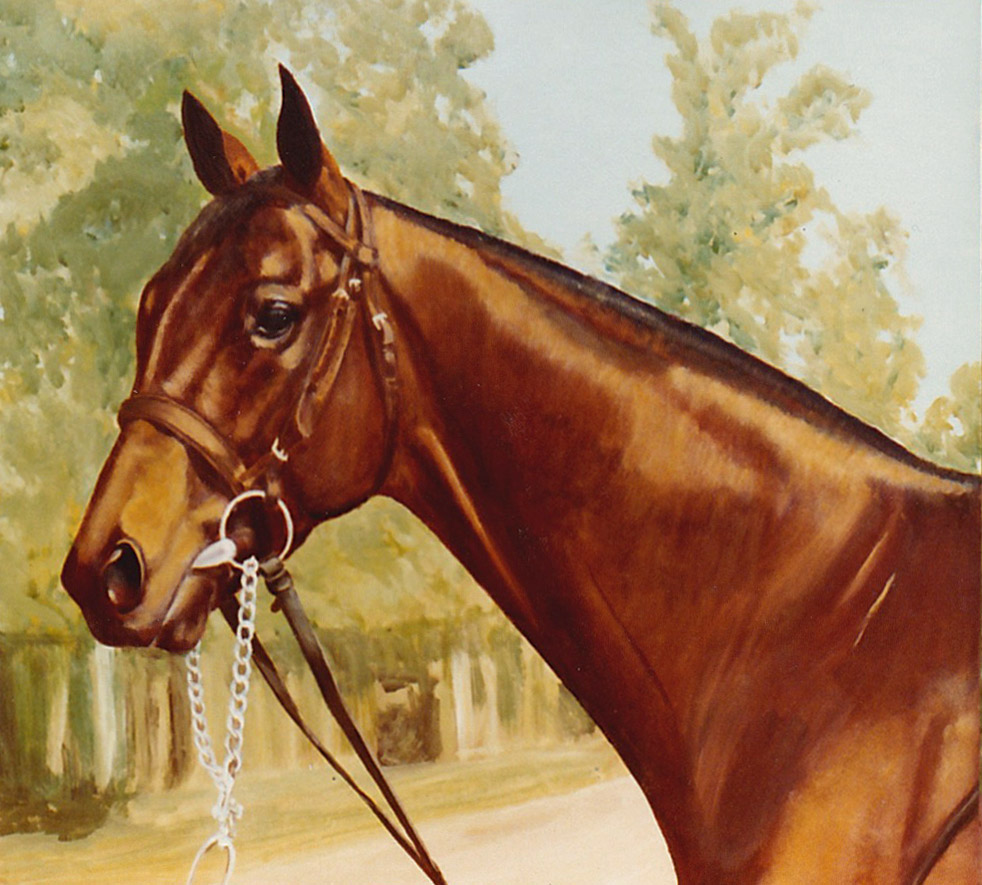
- Norcliffe, winner of the 1976 race
- Class: Restricted
- Location: Fort Erie Race Track; Fort Erie, Ontario, Canada
- Inaugurated: 1929 (97 years ago)
- Race type: Flat / Thoroughbred
- Website: forterieracing.com/prince-of-wales

Race information
- Distance: 1 3/16 mi (1.9 km)
- Surface: Dirt
- Track: Left-handed
- Qualification: Three-year-olds (foaled in Canada)
- Weight: Scale Weight
- Purse: CDN$400,000

The Prince of Wales Stakes is a Canadian Thoroughbred horse race run annually at Fort Erie Race Track in Fort Erie, Ontario. Restricted to only three-year-old horses bred in Canada, it is contested on dirt over a distance of 1 3/16 miles (1.9 km; 9 1/2 furlongs). In 1959, the Prince of Wales Stakes became the second race in the Canadian Triple Crown series. It follows the August running of the King's Plate and precedes the Breeders' Stakes in October.

The race was inaugurated in 1929 at the now defunct Thorncliffe Park Raceway in today's Thorncliffe Park neighbourhood of central east Toronto.

== Historical notes ==
In 1959, the E.P. Taylor colt New Providence emerged as a Triple Crown champion in its first year of existence. In the ensuing years, six more three-year-olds have equaled the feat. In 2014, it was decided to grandfather the five horses who had won the series prior to 1959 as well.

According to the racetrack's website, for fans, the most popular winner of the race was the Canadian and American Hall of Fame filly Dance Smartly who went on to win the 1991 Triple Crown.

In 1995 Barbara J. Minshall became the first woman to train the winner of a Canadian Triple Crown race when the Minshall Farms colt Kiridashi won. To date, no female jockey has won the Prince of Wales Stakes, although Francine Villeneuve and Autumn Snow lost the 2005 running by a nose to Ablo.

Uniquely, the 2003 edition featured the first "father vs. daughter" match up in a Canadian Triple Crown race, when jockeys David Clark and Cory Clark competed against one another. He finished third aboard Shoal Water, while she brought her horse, Sonofawac, home in sixth position.

From 1959 through 1987 the Prince of Wales Stakes was run on turf. Since inception, it has been contested at four different Ontario racetracks and at various distances:

- 1 1/8 miles : 1929–1930 at Thorncliffe Park Raceway, 1957–1958 at Woodbine Racetrack
- 1 1/16 miles : 1932–1942 and 1947–1952 at Thorncliffe Park Raceway, 1944–1945 and 1953–1955 at Old Woodbine Racetrack, 1956 at Woodbine Racetrack
- 1 3/8 miles : 1959–1975 at Fort Erie Racetrack
- 1 1/2 miles : 1976–1987 at Fort Erie Racetrack
- 1 3/16 miles : 1988–present at Fort Erie Racetrack

== Records ==
Speed record: (at current distance of 1 3/16 miles)

- 1:53.80 – Bruce's Mill (1994)

Most wins by a jockey:

- 5 – Hugo Dittfach (1960, 1962, 1963, 1966, 1967)

Most wins by a trainer:

- 7 – Gordon J. McCann (1951, 1952, 1954, 1959, 1961, 1963, 1967)

Most wins by an owner:

- 9 – E. P. Taylor and/or Windfields Farm (1951, 1952, 1954, 1959, 1961, 1963, 1967, 1972, 1988)

== Winners ==
| Year | Winner | Jockey | Trainer | Owner | Time |
|---|---|---|---|---|---|
| 2026 | Military Time | Fraser Aebly | Mark E. Casse | Gary Barber & St. Elias Stable | 1:56.02 |
| 2025 | Runaway Again | Ryan Munger | Sid C. Attard | Stronach Stables | 1:55.64 |
| 2024 | Vitality | Jose Campos | Harold Ladouceur | Stronach Stables | 1:55.72 |
| 2023 | Velocitor | Justin Stein | Kevin Attard | Al & Bill Ulwelling | 1:55.24 |
| 2022 | Duke of Love | Justin Stein | Josie Carroll | MyRaceHorse Stable | 1:58.07 |
| 2021 | Haddassah | Gary Boulanger | Kevin Attard | Al and Bill Ulwelling | 1:56.15 |
| 2020 | Mighty Heart | Daisuke Fukumoto | Josie Carroll | Lawrence P. Cordes | 1:55.59 |
| 2019 | Tone Broke | Ricardo Santana Jr. | Steve Asmussen | L and N Racing | 1:56.56 |
| 2018 | Wonder Gadot | John Velazquez | Mark E. Casse | Gary Barber | 1:58.71 |
| 2017 | Cool Catomine | Luis Contreras | John Ross | Jack of Hearts Racing / J.R. Racing Stable Inc. | 1:55.63 |
| 2016 | Amis Gizmo | Luis Contreras | Josie Carroll | Ivan Dalos | 1:56.76 |
| 2015 | Breaking Lucky | James S. McAleney | Reade Baker | Gunpowder Farms | 1:56.59 |
| 2014 | Coltimus Prime | Eurico Rosa da Silva | Justin J. Nixon | Cabernet Racing Stables | 1:54.58 |
| 2013 | Uncaptured | Miguel Mena | Mark E. Casse | John C. Oxley | 1:55.49 |
| 2012 | Dixie Strike | Patrick Husbands | Mark E. Casse | John C. Oxley | 1:57.54 |
| 2011 | Pender Harbour | Luis Contreras | Mike De Paulo | Denny Andrews & Robert Giffin | 1:55.74 |
| 2010 | Golden Moka | Anthony Stephen | Brian A. Lynch | Good Friends Stable | 1:56.45 |
| 2009 | Gallant | Corey Fraser | Mark E. Casse | Woodford Racing LLC | 1:56.74 |
| 2008 | Harlem Rocker | Eibar Coa | Todd Pletcher | Adena Racing Venture | 1:56.46 |
| 2007 | Alezzandro | Todd Kabel | Kevin Attard | Knob Hill Stable | 1:55.04 |
| 2006 | Shillelagh Slew | Dino Luciani | Michael P. DePaulo | David H. T. James | 1:55.87 |
| 2005 | Ablo | Gerry Olguin | Roger Attfield | Michael & Phyllis Canino | 1:56.90 |
| 2004 | A Bit O'Gold | Jono Jones | Catherine Day Phillips | Kingfield Racing Stables | 1:57.69 |
| 2003 | Wando † | Patrick Husbands | Mike Keogh | Gus Schickedanz | 1:55.84 |
| 2002 | Le Cinquieme Essai | Brian Bochinski | Paul Nielsen | William A. Scott | 1:56.53 |
| 2001 | Win City | Constant Montpellier | Robert P. Tiller | Frank Di Giulio Jr. | 1:56.14 |
| 2000 | Scatter the Gold | Todd Kabel | Mark Frostad | Sam-Son Farm | 1:56.01 |
| 1999 | Gandria | Constant Montpellier | James Cheadle | Arosa Farm | 1:56.20 |
| 1998 | Archers Bay | Robert Landry | Todd Pletcher | Melnyk / Bristow | 1:55.20 |
| 1997 | Cryptocloser | Willie Martinez | Mark Frostad | Mack / Sorokolit | 1:56.00 |
| 1996 | Stephanotis | Mickey Walls | Barbara J. Minshall | Minshall Farms | 1:55.20 |
| 1995 | Kiridashi | Larry Attard | Barbara J. Minshall | Minshall Farms | 1:55.00 |
| 1994 | Bruce's Mill | Craig Perret | Mark Frostad | Earle I. Mack & partners | 1:53.80 |
| 1993 | Peteski † | Dave Penna | Roger Attfield | Earle I. Mack | 1:54.40 |
| 1992 | Benburb | Larry Attard | Phil England | Knob Hill Stable | 1:57.40 |
| 1991 | Dance Smartly † | Pat Day | Jim Day | Sam-Son Farm | 1:56.60 |
| 1990 | Izvestia † | Don Seymour | Roger Attfield | Kinghaven Farms | 1:56.40 |
| 1989 | With Approval † | Don Seymour | Roger Attfield | Kinghaven Farms | 1:56.80 |
| 1988 | Regal Classic | Sandy Hawley | Jim Day | Sam-Son/Windfields | 2:00.20 |
| 1987 | Coryphee | Brian Swatuk | Sam DiPasquale | S. Carnevale | 2:39.60 |
| 1986 | Golden Choice | Vincent Bracciale, Jr. | Michael Tammaro | Sanderson / Belanger | 2:44.40 |
| 1985 | Imperial Choice | Irwin Driedger | Jim Day | Sam-Son Farm | 2:34.60 |
| 1984 | Val Dansant | John LeBlanc | Gerry Belanger | Sanderson / Norman | 2:48.60 |
| 1983 | Archdeacon | Vincent Bracciale, Jr. | John J. Tammaro, Jr. | Kinghaven Farms | 2:32.00 |
| 1982 | Runaway Groom | Robin Platts | John DiMario | Albert J. Coppola | 2:38.40 |
| 1981 | Cadet Corps | Robin Platts | W. Granger | FNR Stable | 2:34.80 |
| 1980 | Allan Blue | Joey Belowus | Gil Rowntree | Stafford Farms | 2:34.40 |
| 1979 | Mass Rally | George HoSang | Duke Campbell | D. Mann | 2:33.40 |
| 1978 | Overskate | Robin Platts | Gil Rowntree | Stafford Farms | 2:34.40 |
| 1977 | Dance In Time | Gary Stahlbaum | Frank H. Merrill, Jr. | Viscount Hardinge | 2:31.80 |
| 1976 | Norcliffe | Jeffrey Fell | Roger Attfield | Norcliffe Stable | 2:30.20 |
| 1975 | L'Enjoleur | Sandy Hawley | Yonnie Starr | Jean-Louis Lévesque | 2:32.40 |
| 1974 | Rushton's Corsair | James Kelly | Glen Magnusson | Aubrey W. Minshall | 2:23.40 |
| 1973 | Tara Road | Sandy Hawley | Gil Rowntree | Stafford Farms | 2:16:80 |
| 1972 | Presidial | John LeBlanc | Roy Johnson | Windfields Farm | 2:16.60 |
| 1971 | New Pro Escar | James Kelly | Andrew G. Smithers | E. Lieberman | 2:15.20 |
| 1970 | Almoner | Sandy Hawley | Jerry G. Lavigne | Parkview Stable | 2:19.80 |
| 1969 | Sharp-Eyed Quillo | Heliodoro Gustines | Horatio Luro | J. Hood | 2:16.60 |
| 1968 | Rouletabille | Richard Grubb | Yonnie Starr | Jean-Louis Lévesque | 2:18.60 |
| 1967 | Battling | Hugo Dittfach | Gordon J. McCann | Windfields Farm | 2:21.20 |
| 1966 | He's A Smoothie | Hugo Dittfach | Warren Beasley | William R. Beasley | 2:19.00 |
| 1965 | Good Old Mort | Sam McComb | Jerry C. Meyer | Dane Hill Acres | 2:22.80 |
| 1964 | Canadillis | Avelino Gomez | M. Long | Viscount Hardinge | 2:35.00 |
| 1963 | Canebora † | Hugo Dittfach | Gordon J. McCann | Windfields Farm | 2:30.60 |
| 1962 | King Gorm | Hugo Dittfach | Richard Townrow | Lanson Farm | 2:21.20 |
| 1961 | Song of Even | Jim Fitzsimmons | Gordon J. McCann | Windfields Farm | 2:29.00 |
| 1960 | Bulpamiru | Hugo Dittfach | Red Barnard | Shermanor Farm | 2:19.80 |
| 1959 | New Providence † | Avelino Gomez | Gordon J. McCann | Windfields Farm | 2:18.00 |
| 1958 | White Apache | Don Hale | F. Russell | Four L's Stable | 1:52.20 |
| 1957 | Our Sirdar | E. Roy | F. Cook | Shermanor Farms | 1:59.60 |
| 1956 | Canadian Champ † | David Stevenson | John Passero | William R. Beasley | 1:46.20 |
| 1955 | Ace Marine † | George Walker | Yonnie Starr | Larkin Maloney | 1:45.20 |
| 1954 | Queen's Own | B. Albert | Gordon J. McCann | E. P. Taylor | 1:46.20 |
| 1953 | Chain Reaction | Nick Combest | Richard Townrow | Mrs. Elodie S. Tomlinson | 1:44.40 |
| 1952 | Acadian | Jose Vina | Gordon J. McCann | E. P. Taylor | 1:44.80 |
| 1951 | Major Factor | Alf Bavington | Gordon J. McCann | E. P. Taylor | 1:52.20 |
| 1950 | Nephisto | Johnny Dewhurst | Arthur Brent | Parkwood Stable | 1:48.80 |
| 1949 | Victory Arch | Pat Remillard | Robert K. Hodgson | North Downs Farm | 1:45.60 |
| 1948 | Lord Fairmond | L. Kerr | Harry Giddings, Jr. | Whittier Park Stock Farm | 1:48.40 |
| 1947 | Burboy | Robert Fisher | Robert Rushton | Bur-fit Stable | 1:48.20 |
| 1946 | no race | | | | |
| 1945 | Uttermost † | Robert B. Watson | Cecil Howard | Harry C. Hatch | 1:45.00 |
| 1944 | Ompalo | Robert B. Watson | Cecil Howard | Harry C. Hatch | 1:47.00 |
| 1943 | no race | | | | |
| 1942 | Ten to Ace | Charles W. Smith | Harry Giddings, Jr. | Harry Giddings | 1:50.40 |
| 1941 | no race | | | | |
| 1940 | Hood | Pat Remillard | C. Mitchell | J. R. McIntyre | 1:49.40 |
| 1939 | Archworth † | Sydney Denny Birley | Mark Cowell | C. George McCullagh | 1:46.40 |
| 1938 | no race | | | | |
| 1937 | Cease Fire | Charley Critchfield | M. Maciver | H. R. Bain | 1:47.80 |
| 1936 | Samoan | Frankie Mann | Johnny Thorpe | Edward Frowde Seagram | 1:47.20 |
| 1935 | no race | | | | |
| 1934 | no race | | | | |
| 1933 | Syngo | John "Red" Pollard | Jack Whyte | R. E. Webster | 1:47.40 |
| 1932 | Queensway † | Frankie Mann | Harry Giddings, Jr. | Robert W. R. Cowie | 1:52.00 |
| 1931 | no race | | | | |
| 1930 | Spearhead | Earl Steffen | George Strate | Tedluc Stable | 1:55.20 |
| 1929 | Lion Hearted | Henry Little | R. Emmett Potts | Mrs. W. J. Giblin | 1:54.60 |

A † designates a Triple Crown winner.

== Broadcasting ==
TSN owns broadcast rights to the event. It has carried the race intermittently due to the lack of consistent sponsorship; the race aired on TSN in 2018 through a sponsorship with the Ontario Lottery and Gaming Corporation.
