= Chief Bearhart =

Canadian-bred Thoroughbred racehorse

- Sire: Chief's Crown
- Grandsire: Danzig
- Dam: Amelia Bearhart
- Damsire: Bold Hour
- Sex: Stallion
- Foaled: 1993
- Country: Canada
- Colour: Chestnut
- Breeder: Richard D. Maynard
- Owner: Sam-Son Farm
- Trainer: Mark Frostad
- Record: 26: 12-5-3
- Earnings: $3,381,557

Major wins
- Elkhorn Stakes (1997); King Edward Breeders' Cup Stakes (1997); Canadian International Stakes (1997); Sky Classic Stakes (1997, 1998); Niagara Breeders' Cup Turf Handicap (1998); Manhattan Handicap (1998); Canadian Classic Race wins: Breeders' Stakes (1996); Breeders' Cup wins: Breeders' Cup Turf (1997)

Awards
- American Champion Male Turf Horse (1997); Canadian Male Turf Champion (1996, 1997, 1998); Canadian Champion Older Male Horse (1997); Canadian Horse of the Year (1997, 1998)

Honours
- Canadian Horse Racing Hall of Fame (2002); Chief Bearhart Stakes at Woodbine Racetrack

Chief Bearhart (February 1, 1993 – September 18, 2012) was a Canadian Thoroughbred racehorse and sire. A turf specialist, he won six Sovereign Awards and was voted American Champion Male Turf Horse for 1997.

== Background ==
Chief Bearheart was bred by Richard D. Maynard and sired by Chief's Crown out of the mare Amelia Bearhart by Bold Hour. His grandsire was Danzig. He was owned by Sam-Son Farm of Milton, Ontario and was trained by Mark Frostad.

== Racing career ==
In 1995, at age two, injuries kept Chief Bearhart out of all but one race. At age 3, he had only modest success until his trainer switched him from racing on dirt tracks to racing on turf. He then won the 1996 Breeders' Stakes, the final and only leg on grass of the Canadian Triple Crown. On July 25, 1996, Chief Bearhart won an allowance race of about a mile and three-eighths on turf at Woodbine Racetrack in a track record time of 2:16 flat.

Popular with racing fans because he almost always came from well back in the field, in 1997 Chief Bearhart blossomed into a star. Ridden by José A. Santos he won five of seven races with two second-place finishes. Among his wins were the prestigious Canadian International Stakes at Woodbine Racetrack and at Hollywood Park Racetrack in the United States he won the Breeders' Cup Turf by a half length. For his 1997 performances, Chief Bearhart earned more than $2 million in purses and was voted the Sovereign Award for Horse of the Year and the Eclipse Award for Outstanding Male Turf Horse.

Racing at age five, in 1998 Chief Bearhart won his second Canadian "Horse of the Year" title after winning the Niagara Breeders' Cup Handicap, the Sky Classic Handicap and setting a course record in winning the Grade I Manhattan Handicap. He was retired after the 1998 racing season and in 2002 was inducted into the Canadian Horse Racing Hall of Fame.

== Stud career ==
Chief Bearhart stood at stud at the Shizunai Stallion Station in Japan. He sired six stakes winners for 10 stakes wins. He died of heart failure on September 18, 2012.

== Pedigree ==
Pedigree of Chief Bearhart
Sire Chief's Crown	Danzig	Northern Dancer	Nearctic
Sire Chief's Crown	Danzig	Northern Dancer	Natalma
Sire Chief's Crown	Danzig	Pas De Nom	Admiral's Voyage
Sire Chief's Crown	Danzig	Pas De Nom	Petitioner
Sire Chief's Crown	Six Crowns	Secretariat	Bold Ruler
Sire Chief's Crown	Six Crowns	Secretariat	Somethingroyal
Sire Chief's Crown	Six Crowns	Chris Evert	Swoon's Son
Sire Chief's Crown	Six Crowns	Chris Evert	Miss Carmie
Dam Amelia Bearhart	Bold Hour	Bold Ruler	Nasrullah
Dam Amelia Bearhart	Bold Hour	Bold Ruler	Miss Disco
Dam Amelia Bearhart	Bold Hour	Seven Thirty	Mr. Music
Dam Amelia Bearhart	Bold Hour	Seven Thirty	Time To Dine
Dam Amelia Bearhart	Myrtlewood Lass	Ribot	Tenerani
Dam Amelia Bearhart	Myrtlewood Lass	Ribot	Romanella
Dam Amelia Bearhart	Myrtlewood Lass	Gold Digger	Nashua
Dam Amelia Bearhart	Myrtlewood Lass	Gold Digger	Sequence
