= Northern Dancer Turf Stakes =

Turf horse race in Canada

- Class: Grade I
- Location: Woodbine Racetrack; Toronto, Ontario, Canada
- Inaugurated: 1953
- Race type: Thoroughbred - Flat racing
- Website: Woodbine racetrack

Race information
- Distance: 1 1/2 miles (12 furlongs)
- Surface: Turf
- Track: Left-handed
- Qualification: Three-year-olds & up
- Weight: Handicap
- Purse: Can$227,040 (2016)

The Northern Dancer Turf Stakes is a Canadian Thoroughbred horse race held annually at Woodbine Racetrack in Toronto, Ontario in mid-September. A Grade I event with a current purse of Can$300,000, it is run at a distance of 1 1/2 miles on Woodbine's E. P. Taylor turf course.

Inaugurated as the Niagara Handicap, it was first raced on dirt at the Fort Erie Racetrack. In 1957 the race was changed to run on turf and was moved to the Woodbine Racetrack in 1985 where for 1986 only, it was run on dirt. The race became part of the Breeders' Cup program and the name was amended to the Niagara Breeders' Cup Handicap. In 2006, the event was renamed to honour Canada's most famous racehorse, Northern Dancer.

Over the years, the race has been run at various distances:

- 1 1/16 miles : 1953-1956
- 1 1/8 miles : 1957-1975
- 1 1/4 miles : 1990-1994
- 1 1/2 miles : 1976-1989, 1995 to present

== Records ==
Speed Record:

- 2:25.87 - Strut the Stage (2004) at the current distance of 1 1/2 miles

Most wins:

- 2 - Marshall Ney II (1957, 1958)
- 2 - Strut the Stage (2003, 2004)
- 2 - Wigmore Hall (2011, 2012)
- 2 - Johnny Bear (2017, 2018)

Most wins by an owner:

- 8 - Sam-Son Farm (1991, 1996, 1997, 1998, 2002, 2003, 2004, 2020)
- 5 - Gardiner Farm (1967, 1968, 1970, 1974, 1976)

Most wins by a jockey:

- 4 - Todd Kabel (2002, 2003, 2004, 2006)
- 3 - Sandy Hawley (1970, 1996, 1997)

Most wins by a Trainer:

- 6 - Lou Cavalaris, Jr. (1966, 1967, 1968, 1970, 1974, 1976)
- 6 - Mark Frostad (1996, 1997, 1998, 2002, 2003, 2004)

== Winners since 1986 ==
Year	Winner	Age	Jockey	Trainer	Owner	Time
2021	Not held					
2020	Say The Word	5	Emma-Jayne Wilson	Gail Cox	Sam-Son Farm	2:29.87
2019	Old Persian	4	James Doyle	Charlie Appleby	Godolphin	2:27.78
2018	Johnny Bear	7	Luis Contreras	Ashlee Brnjas	Colebrook Farms & Bear Stables, Ltd.	2:25.74
2017	Johnny Bear	6	Luis Contreras	Ashlee Brnjas	Colebrook Farms & Bear Stables, Ltd.	2:27.30
2016	The Pizza Man	7	Flavien Prat	Roger A. Brueggemann	Midwest Thoroughbreds	2:31.75
2015	Interpol	4	Emma-Jayne Wilson	Sid C. Attard	JMJ Racing Stables	2:33.56
2014	Sheikhzayedroad	5	Martin Lane	David Simcock	Rabbah Bloodstock	2:32.37
2013	Forte Dei Marmi	7	Eurico Rosa Da Silva	Roger L. Attfield	Stella Perdomo	2:28.46
2012	Wigmore Hall	5	Jamie Spencer	Michael Bell	Mark B. Hawtin	2:28.28
2011	Wigmore Hall	4	Jamie Spencer	Michael Bell	Mark B. Hawtin	2:30.67
2010	Redwood	4	Michael Hills	Barry Hills	Juddmonte Farms	2:28.97
2009	Marsh Side†	6	Javier Castellano	Neil Drysdale	Robert S. Evans	2:26.68
2008	Champs Elysees	5	Garrett Gomez	Robert J. Frankel	Juddmonte Farms	2:32.02
2007	Sky Conqueror	5	Edgar Prado	Darwin D. Banach	William A. Sorokolit, Sr.	2:27.45
2006	Sky Conqueror	4	Todd Kabel	Darwin D. Banach	William A. Sorokolit, Sr.	2:34.36
2005	Revved Up	7	Brice Blanc	Christophe Clement	Live Oak Plantation	2:27.13
2004	Strut the Stage	6	Todd Kabel	Mark Frostad	Sam-Son Farm	2:25.87
2003	Strut the Stage	5	Todd Kabel	Mark Frostad	Sam-Son Farm	2:27.13
2002	Full of Wonder	4	Todd Kabel	Mark Frostad	Sam-Son Farm	2:26.18
2001	Honor Glide	7	Robbie Davis	Christophe Clement	Robert Schaedle III et al.	2:26.52
2000	River Boat	7	Gary Boulanger	Frank Huarte	Frank Huarte	2:32.16
1999	Thornfield	5	Richard Dos Ramos	Phil England	Knob Hill Stable	2:29.32
1998	Chief Bearhart	5	José A. Santos	Mark Frostad	Sam-Son Farm	2:30.00
1997	Desert Waves	7	Sandy Hawley	Mark Frostad	Sam-Son Farm	2:30.40
1996	Desert Waves	6	Sandy Hawley	Mark Frostad	Sam-Son Farm	2:27.00
1995	Lindon Lime	5	Craig Perret	W. Elliott Walden	Frank Mansell	2:27.00
1994	River Majesty	5	Mike E. Smith	Christophe Clement	W. Gretzky / S. Port	2:03.20
1993	Shiny Key	5	Mark Larsen	Alton H. Quanbeck	D. Morgan Firestone	2:01.60
1992	Beau Fasa	6	Stanley Bethley	Gordon Colbourne	Box Arrow Farm	2:02.20
1991	Tot of Rum	5	Daniel David	Jim Day	Sam-Son Farm	2:04.80
1990	Hodges Bay	5	Jean Cruguet	Willard C. Freeman	Plandome Stable	2:05.20
1989	Turfah	6	Dave Penna	Thomas Skiffington, Jr.	Shadwell Stable	2:28.00
1988	Master Treaty	4	Dave Penna	Trevor Swan	Anderson/Taylor Stables	2:34.40
1987	Southjet	4	Jean-Luc Samyn	Stephen L. DiMauro	Dogwood Stable	2:32.80
1986	Golden Choice	3	David Clark	Michael A. Tammaro	Sanderson / Belanger	2:32.40

== Earlier winners ==
- 1985 - Sondrio
- 1984 - Cost Control
- 1983 - Norwick
- 1982 - Lord Elgin
- 1981 - Bridle Path
- 1980 - Morold
- 1979 - Dom Alaric
- 1978 - Tuxedo Mac
- 1977 - Momigi
- 1976 - Don Lorenzo
- 1975 - Yvetot
- 1974 - Carney's Point
- 1973 - Fun Co K
- 1972 - Belle Geste
- 1971 - One For All
- 1970 - Panpiper
- 1969 - Hammer Kopf
- 1968 - The Knack ll
- 1967 - Canadel‡
- 1966 - Orbiter
- 1965 - Quick Pitch
- 1964 - Will I Rule
- 1963 - Puss n Boots
- 1962 - Our Jeep
- 1961 - Harmonizing
- 1960 - Moony
- 1959 - Grey Monarch
- 1958 - Marshall Ney II
- 1957 - Marshall Ney II
- 1956 - Captor
- 1955 - Jimminy Baxter
- 1954 - Pheasant Boy
- 1953 - Scene One
- † In 2009, Marsh Side finished first but was disqualified and set back to fourth. On appeal, the original order of finish was restored on May 26, 2010.
- ‡ In 1967, Carteret finished first but was disqualified and set back to last.

== See also ==
- List of Canadian flat horse races
