= Richard Dos Ramos =

Canadian jockey

Personal information
- Born: September 10, 1962 (age 64) Port of Spain, Trinidad and Tobago
- Occupation: Jockey

Horse racing career
- Sport: Horse racing
- Career wins: 2,000+ (ongoing)

Major racing wins
- Autumn Stakes (1982, 1989); Canadian Stakes (1982); Nearctic Stakes (1983, 1998); Eclipse Stakes (1984); Achievement Stakes (1986, 1987); Bessarabian Stakes (1986, 1988, 1990); Bison City Stakes (1986); Coronation Futurity Stakes (1986); Natalma Stakes (1986, 1991, 2001); Jockey Club Cup (1986); Toronto Cup Stakes (1986, 1999); Wonder Where Stakes (1986, 1987); Woodbine Oaks (1986, 1994); Canadian Derby (1987); Display Stakes (1987); George C. Hendrie Stakes (1988, 1995, 2001); Princess Elizabeth Stakes (1989, 2001); Whimsical Stakes (1990, 2001); Kennedy Road Stakes (1991); Royal North Stakes (1991); Molson Export Million Stakes (1992); Durham Cup Stakes (1993); Plate Trial Stakes (1993); Vigil Stakes (1995); La Prevoyante Stakes (1996, 1997, 2000, 2004); Cup and Saucer Stakes (1996, 1997, 1998); Frost King Stakes (1997, 2002); Canadian International Stakes (1999); Dominion Day Stakes (1999, 2001); Niagara Handicap (1999); Shady Well Stakes (2001); Nassau Stakes (2003); Ohio Derby (2005); Ontario Derby (2005); Charlie Barley Stakes (2008) Canadian Classic Race wins: Breeders' Stakes (1986, 2008, 2010)

Racing awards
- Canadian Champion Apprentice Jockey (1981, 1982); Avelino Gomez Memorial Award (2002)

Significant horses
- Benburb, Carotene, Thornfield; Blonde Executive, Palladio

Richard Anthony Dos Ramos (born September 10, 1962 in Port of Spain, Trinidad and Tobago) is a Canadian jockey in thoroughbred horse racing. He grew up in Malton, a neighbourhood in Mississauga, Ontario, where his family emigrated when he was young. He began his career in horse racing in 1981, winning the Sovereign Award for Outstanding Apprentice Jockey that year and again in 1982.

In 1986, Dos Ramos rode Carotene to victory in the Breeders' Stakes, the third leg of the Canadian Triple Crown. He has ridden two horses who went on to be named Canada's Horse of the Year: in 1992 with Benburb he rode to victory in the 1992 Molson Export Million Stakes and in 1999 with Thornfield he captured the prestigious Canadian International Stakes

Dos Ramos was voted the 2002 Avelino Gomez Memorial Award for his significant contribution to the sport of thoroughbred racing in Canada. During his career, he was won more than 2,000 races, of which more than 1,300 have been at his home base, Woodbine Racetrack. Racing in the United States, aboard Palladio, he won the 2005 Ohio Derby, that state's richest thoroughbred race.

== Year-end charts ==
Chart (2000–present)	Peak position
National Earnings List for Jockeys 2000	94
National Earnings List for Jockeys 2001	89
National Earnings List for Jockeys 2003	81
