= Leonnatus Anteas =

Canadian-bred Thoroughbred racehorse

- Sire: Stormy Atlantic
- Dam: South Sea Blues
- Damsire: Cure The Blues
- Sex: Stallion
- Foaled: 2004 - 2018
- Country: Canada
- Colour: Chestnut
- Breeder: Josham Farms
- Owner: Knob Hill Stable
- Trainer: Kevin Attard
- Record: 11: 5-2-0
- Earnings: $600,074

Major wins
- Vandal Stakes (2006); Cup and Saucer Stakes (2006); Coronation Futurity Stakes (2006); Durham Cup Stakes (2007)

Awards
- Canadian Champion 2-Yr-Old colt (2006)
- Last updated on February 21, 2008

Leonnatus Anteas (foaled March 20, 2004 in Ontario) is a Canadian Champion Thoroughbred racehorse. Owned by the Steve Stavro estate, the grandson of Storm Cat was sold by Denali Stud as agents for Josham Farms of Ontario at the September 2005 Keeneland Sales. The colt was named after one of Alexander the Great's bodyguards.

Racing in Canada at age two, Leonnatus Anteas won all three races he entered and was voted the 2006 Sovereign Award for Champion 2-Year-Old Male Horse. Each win was on a different track surface. He won the Vandal Stakes on dirt, the Cup and Saucer Stakes on turf, and the Coronation Futurity Stakes on the new Polytrack surface.

Leonnatus Anteas raced three times in 2007, the last two of which were on turf. A winterbook favorite for the Queen's Plate, two days before the race he had to be scratched due to an infection in his pastern. The three-year-old colt made his next start in the September 15 Super Derby at Louisiana Downs in Bossier City, Louisiana, finishing fourth.
