= L'Epée =

Mountain in Switzerland

- Location within Switzerland

Highest point
- Elevation: 3,605 m (11,827 ft)
- Coordinates: 45°57′14.5″N 7°15′55.2″E

Geography
- Location: Switzerland
- Parent range: Pennine Alps

L'Epée is a mountain in the Pennine Alps, situated near Bourg Saint Pierre in Switzerland. It is located on the ridge Les Maisons Blanches in the Grand Combin massif.
