= Overskate =

Canadian-bred Thoroughbred racehorse

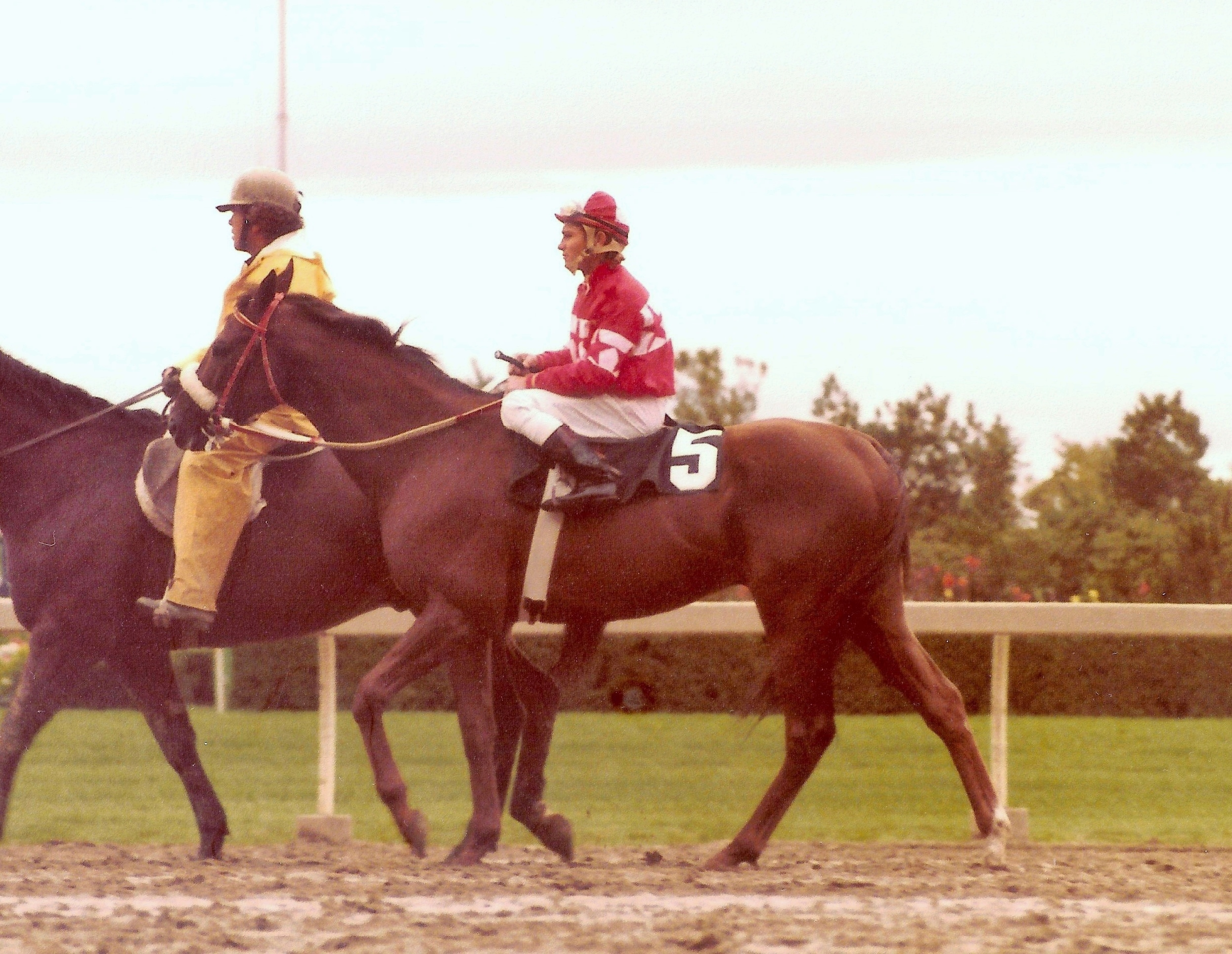
- Overskate and Robin Platts before the last race of the horse's career, the Jockey Club Cup Stakes Handicap at Woodbine on October 4, 1980. He won carrying 128 lbs.
- Sire: Nodouble
- Grandsire: Noholme
- Dam: Overstate
- Damsire: Speak John
- Sex: Stallion
- Foaled: 1975
- Country: Canada
- Colour: Chestnut
- Breeder: Stafford Farms
- Owner: Jack Stafford
- Trainer: Gil Rowntree
- Record: 42: 24-5-4
- Earnings: $791,634

Major wins
- Coronation Futurity Stakes (1977); Plate Trial Stakes (1978); Prince of Wales Stakes (1978); Breeders' Stakes (1978); Manitoba Derby (1978); Stars and Stripes Handicap (1979); Bernard Baruch Handicap (1979); Canadian Maturity Stakes (1979); Ultimus Stakes (1979); Bowling Green Handicap (1979); Jacques Cartier Stakes (1979, 1980); Jockey Club Cup Handicap (1980); Eclipse Handicap (1980)

Awards
- Canadian Champion 2-year-old Colt (1977); Canadian Champion 3-year-old Colt (1978); Canadian Horse of the Year (1978, 1979); Canadian Champion Older Male Horse (1979, 1980); Canadian Champion Turf Horse (1978, 1979, 1980)

Honours
- Canadian Horse Racing Hall of Fame (1993); Overskate Stakes at Woodbine Racetrack

Overskate (1975–1992) was a Canadian Thoroughbred Champion Hall of Fame racehorse. Sired by Nodouble out of the dam Overstate, who was a descendant of the great sire Princequillo as well as Man o' War, Overskate was foaled at his owner's farm in Port Elgin, Ontario.

A small horse, Overskate raced on both grass and dirt surfaces and won major races on sloppy tracks. He received nine Sovereign Awards while racing in Canada and at various tracks in the United States. He set a track record for 9 furlongs (1 1/8 miles) at Assiniboia Downs in Winnipeg, Manitoba and for 11 furlongs (1 3/8 miles) on turf at Belmont Park in Elmont, New York.

Ridden by jockey Robin Platts, Overskate came off his 1977 two-year-old championship season with a win in the Plate Trial Stakes and then finished second in the 1978 Queen's Plate, Canada's most prestigious race and the first leg of the Canadian Triple Crown. He came back to win the next two Triple Crown races, the Prince of Wales and Breeders' Stakes. Successful at age four and five, the two-time Canadian Horse of the Year retired in 1980 as the all-time leading money winner among Canadian-bred horses.
