= Chief Bearhart Stakes =

- Class: Non-graded stakes
- Location: Woodbine Racetrack; Toronto, Ontario, Canada
- Inaugurated: 2002
- Race type: Thoroughbred - Flat racing
- Website: www.woodbineentertainment.com

Race information
- Distance: 1 1/4 miles (10 furlongs)
- Surface: Turf
- Track: Left-handed
- Qualification: Three-years-old & up
- Weight: Assigned
- Purse: $100,000

The Chief Bearhart Stakes is a Thoroughbred horse race run annually in late October at Woodbine Racetrack in Toronto, Ontario, Canada. Open to horses age three and older, it is contested on turf over a distance of a mile and a quarter (10 furlongs).

Inaugurated on September 29, 2002, the race is named for Sam-Son Farm's Canadian Hall of Fame colt, Chief Bearhart.

The 2006 race was transferred to the dirt track.

== Records ==
Speed record: (Through 1998, Woodbine times were recorded in fifths of a second. Since 1999 they are in hundredths of a second)

- 2:04.65 - Simmard (2009)

Most wins:

- No horse has won this race more than once.

Most wins by an owner:

- 2 - Gary A. Tanaka (2006, 2007)

Most wins by a jockey:

- No jockey has won this race more than once.

Most wins by a trainer:

- 3 - Roger Attfield (2006, 2007, 2009

== Winners ==
Year	Winner	Age	Jockey	Trainer	Owner	Time
2009	Simmard	4	Robert Landry	Roger Attfield	Haras Santa Maria de Araras	2:04.65
2008	no race					
2007	Eccentric	6	David Clark	Roger Attfield	Gary A. Tanaka	2:06.37
2006	Pellegrino	7	James McAleney	Roger Attfield	Gary A. Tanaka	2:06.44
2005	Seattlespectacular	5	Patrick Husbands	Sid C. Attard	RWP Corp Inc.	2:05.42
2004	Last Answer	4	Jono Jones	Michael Keogh	Gus Schickedanz	2:09.67
2003	Colorful Judgement	3	Slade Callaghan	Mark Frostad	Sam-Son Farm	2:07.47
2002	Stage Classic	4	Ray Sabourin	David Cotey	Dominion Bloodstock/Derek Ball	2:06.08
