= Nijinsky Stakes (Canada) =

- Class: Grade II
- Location: Woodbine Racetrack; Toronto, Ontario, Canada
- Inaugurated: 1998
- Race type: Thoroughbred – Flat racing
- Website: Woodbine Racetrack

Race information
- Distance: 1 1/2 miles (12 furlongs)
- Surface: Turf
- Track: Left-handed
- Qualification: Three-year-olds & Up
- Weight: Assigned
- Purse: CAN$175,000 added (since 2013)

The Nijinsky Stakes is a Canadian Thoroughbred horse race held annually at Woodbine Racetrack in Toronto. Since 2009, it has been run in late July. The Grade II race is open to horses aged three years and up and is run on Woodbine Racetrack's E. P. Taylor Turf Course at a distance of one and one eight miles. The race currently offers a purse of CAD$175,000 added.

Inaugurated as the Hong Kong Jockey Club Trophy Stakes in 1998, it was raced during the third week of July on turf at a distance of 1 3/8 miles. In 2002, the Chinese Cultural Centre sponsored the race and it was renamed the Chinese Cultural Centre Stakes. In 2006, the race was renamed the Nijinsky Stakes and the Chinese Cultural Centre assumed sponsorship for the Seagram Cup Stakes .

The race honors the Canadian-born Nijinsky, the 1970 English Triple Crown champion and a son of Canada's most famous horse and most important sire of the 20th century, Northern Dancer.

== Records ==
Time record:

- 2:24.45 @ 1 1/2 miles : Tiz A Slam (2019)
- 2:12.37 @ 1 3/8 miles : Shoal Water (2004)
- 2:00.60 @ 1 1/4 miles : Seaside Retreat (2008) (new course record)
- 1:45.28 @ 1 1/8 miles : So Long George (2013)

Most wins by a horse

- 2 – Up With the Birds (2014, 2016)
- 2 – Windwards Islands (2010, 2011)
- 2 – Tiz A Slam (2018, 2019)

Most wins by a jockey:

- 3 – Todd Kabel (2003, 2004, 2012)

Most wins by a trainer:

- 6 – Mark Frostad (2000, 2002, 2003, 2004, 2010, 2011)

Most wins by an owner:

- 8 – Sam-Son Farm (2000, 2002, 2003, 2004, 2010, 2011, 2014, 2016)

== Winners ==
Year	Winner	Age	Jockey	Trainer	Owner	Dist. (Miles)	Time	Win$	Gr.
2020	Not run due to the COVID-19 pandemic.								
2019	Tiz a Slam	5	Steven Bahen	Roger Attfield	Chiefswood Stable (Robert & Mark Krembil)	11/2	2:24.45	$132,930	G2
2018	Tiz a Slam	4	Steven Bahen	Roger Attfield	Chiefswood Stable (Robert & Mark Krembil)	11/2	2:29.06	$105,000	G2
2017	Dragon Bay	4	Gary Boulanger	Stuart C. Simon	McLellan/McLellan/Simon	11/4	2:02.10	$105,000	G2
2016	Up With the Birds	6	Eurico Rosa Da Silva	Malcolm Pierce	Sam-Son Farm	11/8	1:49.18	$144,000	G2
2015	Are You Kidding Me	5	Alan Garcia	Roger L. Attfield	Kirk/Bates/Riordan	11/8	1:46.59	$120,000	G2
2014	Up With the Birds	4	Eurico Rosa Da Silva	Malcolm Pierce	Sam-Son Farm	11/8	1:45.74	$144,000	G2
2013	So Long George	4	Emma-Jayne Wilson	John Charalambous	Up Hill Stable	11/8	1:45.28	$120,000	G2
2012	Riding the River	5	Todd Kabel	David Cotey	Dominion Bloodstock/HGHR/Linmac Farm	11/8	1:48.05	$180,000	G2
2011	Windward Islands	7	Emma-Jayne Wilson	Mark Frostad	Sam-Son Farm	11/8	1:49.82	$180,000	G2
2010	Windward Islands	6	Chantal Sutherland	Mark Frostad	Sam-Son Farm	11/8	1:53.58	$180,000	G2
2009	Rahy's Attorney	5	Slade Callaghan	Ian Black	Ellie-Boje Farm, et al.	11/4	2:08.42	$207,000	G2
2008	Seaside Retreat	5	Patrick Husbands	Mark E. Casse	William S. Farish IV	11/4	2:00.60	$180,000	G2
2007	Last Answer	7	Emile Ramsammy	Michael Keogh	Gus Schickedanz	11/2	2:31.25	$180,000	G2
2006	Rush Bay	4	David Clark	Tom Amoss	Mueller Thoroughbred Stable	11/2	2:33.89	$180,000	G2
2005	A Bit O'Gold	4	Jono Jones	Catherine Day Phillips	The Two Bit Racing Stable	13/8	2:15.94	$205,920	G2
2004	Shoal Water	4	Todd Kabel	Mark Frostad	Sam-Son Farm	13/8	2:12.37	$199,980	G2
2003	Strut The Stage	5	Todd Kabel	Mark Frostad	Sam-Son Farm	13/8	2:13.85	$198,540	G2
2002	Strike Smartly	5	Laurie Gulas	Mark Frostad	Sam-Son Farm	13/8	2:13.16	$201,780	G2
2001	Allende	4	Na Somsanith	Macdonald Benson	Augustin Stable	13/8	2:16.98	$164,100	G2
2000	Quiet Resolve	5	Robby Albarado	Mark Frostad	Sam-Son Farm	13/8	2:13.20	$169,950	G2
1999	Crown Attorney	6	Mickey Walls	John MacKenzie	Tony & Mary Jane Lamb	13/8	2:18.53	$132,360	
1998	Buck's Boy	5	Earlie Fires	P. Noel Hickey	Quarter B. Farm (George Bunn)	13/8	2:15.40	$131,640	

== See also ==
- List of Canadian flat horse races
