= Mark Frostad =

Canadian racehorse trainer

Personal information
- Born: January 19, 1949 (age 77) Brantford, Ontario, Canada
- Occupations: Trainer, racing executive

Horse racing career
- Sport: Horse racing
- Career wins: 726

Major racing wins
- Northern Dancer Turf Stakes (1996, 1997, 1998, 2002, 2003, 2004); Canadian International Stakes (1997); Commonwealth Stakes (1997); King Edward Stakes (1997, 1999, 2001, 2005, 2010); Play the King Stakes (1997, 1998, 2003, 2004); Toronto Cup Stakes (1997, 2000, 2001, 2002, 2004, 2006, 2007); Turf Classic Stakes (1997); Canadian Stakes (1998); Manhattan Handicap (1998); Cup and Saucer Stakes (1999, 2000, 2001); Woodbine Mile (1999, 2004); Natalma Stakes (2000, 2010); Nijinsky Stakes (2000, 2002, 2003, 2004, 2010, 2011); Woodbine Oaks (2000, 2001, 2004, 2012); Dowager Stakes (2001); Chief Bearhart Stakes (2003); South Ocean Stakes (2006); Trillium Stakes (2012); Sir Barton Stakes (2016) Canadian Triple Crown series: Queen's Plate (1996, 2000, 2001, 2009); Prince of Wales Stakes (1994, 1997, 2000); Breeders' Stakes (1995, 1996, 2002, 2012); Breeders' Cup wins: Breeders' Cup Turf (1997)

Honors
- Canadian Horse Racing Hall of Fame (2011)

Significant horses
- Chief Bearhart, Cryptocloser, Dancethruthedawn, Eye of the Leopard, Eye of the Sphynx, Quiet Resolve, Soaring Free

Mark R. Frostad (born January 19, 1949) is a Canadian thoroughbred horse trainer. Born in Brantford, Ontario, he grew up with a father who owned a stud farm but before becoming involved in thoroughbred horse racing, Frostad obtained a BA degree in literature from Princeton University then in 1976 an MBA degree from the University of Western Ontario in London, Ontario.

In 1991 he became actively involved in racing as a thoroughbred trainer, meeting with great success in the employ of Sam-Son Farm whom he joined in 1995. Among his more than 100 stakes race victories, he won Canada's most prestigious horse race, the Queen's Plate, in 1996, 2000, 2001 and 2009 and both the Canadian International Stakes and the Breeders' Cup Turf in 1997. Mark has also had great success in both the second and third legs of the Canadian Triple Crown winning the Prince of Wales Stakes, three times (1994, 1997, 2000) and the Breeders' Stakes on four occasions (1995, 1996, 2002, 2012).

Frostad has won the Sovereign Award for Outstanding Trainer three times. His significant horses include Quiet Resolve, Chief Bearhart, and Soaring Free, all winners of the Sovereign Award for Canadian Horse of the Year.

Mark Frostad has served as president of the Canadian Horse Society and as a member of the board of directors of Woodbine Entertainment Group, operators of Woodbine Racetrack.

Mark Frostad has a wife, Pam Frostad, and three children, Kate, Justine, and Peter.
