= Paul Nielsen =

Canadian luger (born 1947)

Personal information
- Born: 30 August 1947 (age 77); Wayne, Alberta, Canada

Sport
- Sport: Luge

Paul Nielsen (born 30 August 1947) is a Canadian luger. He competed in the men's singles event at the 1972 Winter Olympics.
