= Knob Hill Stable =

Canadian thoroughbred horse breeder

Knob Hill Stable was a Canadian Thoroughbred horse racing and breeding operation established by Toronto, Ontario businessman Steve Stavro. Stavro's interest in horse racing began in 1967 when he acquired a pair of yearlings – Boy Bandit and Danforth Dan. They were conditioned by J. C. Meyer. However, It was not until the early 1980s that Stavro became passionate about thoroughbreds. As his passion grew, he founded Knob Hill Stable in Newmarket, Ontario. At the peak of Knob Hill Stables, there were more than 60 horses, which included 15 or more racers at Woodbine Racetrack. Stable standouts were Molson Million winner Benburb, Canadian International Stakes winner Thornfield, Sovereign Award champion Leonnatus Anteas and Prince of Wales Stakes winner Alezzandro.

== Steve Stavro Years ==
To further grow Knob Hill Stables prospects, Stavro purchased a 300-acre (120 ha) farm in Kentucky, United States, in 1988. Stavro had begun to take a bigger interest in not only racing horses, but breeding them as well. The Kentucky farm was used for training in the winter, but more importantly, served as the main location for Knob Hill Stables breeding operations. 1988 was also an important year for Knob Hill Stables due to the success of its thoroughbred Granacus. That year, Granacus won the Grade I Blue Grass Stakes at Keeneland Race Course and finished the year winning $300,000 of prize money. The following year Granacus continued his success, starting six races, finishing in the top three all but one time. Granacus ended the year with winnings of $228,755.

Later in the year Benburb had another upset win, this one in the GR2 Molson Export Million. In the race, Benburb knocked off a blue-chip field that included eventual American Horse of the Year A.P. Indy, Alydeed, and GR1 winner Technology. The win was the highest stake victory a Knob Hill Horse had ever achieved and helped to cement Stavro as one of the premiere Canadian stable owners. At the end of the 1992 season, Benburb was selected as the Sovereign Award winner for the Canadian Horse of the Year as well as Champion 3-year-old male honours.

The following year, Stavro's filly Apelia was Champion Sprinter and Bold Debra won the Sovereign Award for Outstanding Broodmare.

In 1995, Knob Hill Stables bred Schossberg, started five races, finishing in first on three occasions. Notably, the five-year-old thoroughbred captured the Philip H. Iselin Handicap and the Salvator Mile Handicap. For the 1995 season, Schossberg finished with earnings of $293,000.

For the remainder of the decade, Knob Hill Stables experienced moderate success, winning some smaller stakes races, but a major win proved elusive. Their fortunes changed, however, in 1999, with the success of the Knob Hill Stable bred 5-year-old Thornfield. Thornfield started six races and won three, including the major Canadian International Stakes, which carried a US$1 million purse. The win was a major upset as Thornfield started the race as the longest shot on the board, further cementing Knob Hill Stables reputation as both a superior breeding stable and as frequent upset artists. As a result of his performance in the 1999 season, Thornfield won the Sovereign Award for horse of the year and Champion Grass Horse.

In the early 2000s, Knob Hill Stables experienced moderate success, with 20 horses accumulating career earnings of US$70,000 or more; however, only two horses achieved graded stakes wins, Chopinina and Saoirse.

== Stavro Foundation Managed ==
After Stavro's death in 2006, his estate assumed the management of Knob Hill Stable, looking to carry on Stavro's legacy and love of horse racing. That year Stavro was posthumously inducted into the Canadian Racing Hall of Fame. The 2006 season would prove to be successful for the stables, largely due to one of the horses Stavro purchased at the Keeneland Yearling Sale, Leonnatus Anteas. Named after one of Alexander the Great's bodyguards, the two-year-old horse would go on to win all three races he entered, with each race being on a different track surface. For his efforts, Leonnatus was voted 2006 Sovereign Award Champion for 2-Year-Old Horse. Leonnatus quickly emerged as one of the more promising Canadian racing horses and began the 2007 season with high expectations. He was a winterbook favorite for the Queens Plate race; however, he could not race due to an infection in his pastern. The three-year-old colt made his next start in the September 15 Super Derby at Louisiana Downs in Bossier City, Louisiana, finishing fourth. Even with Leonnatus' injuries, the 2007 season was one of the most successful in the history of Knob Hill Stables. Leading the charge was the Knob Hill Stables bred three-year-old Alezzandro, a derivative of the name of Stavro's hero, Alexander the Great. That year Alezzandro won the Prince of Wales Stake and finished second in the Queen's Plate, a goal that Stavro strived for his entire life. Alezzandro finished the year 65th in earnings for all of North America and received the Sovereign Award for Champion 3-Year-Old Colt. For the 2007 season, Knob Hill Stables finished with US$1,247,000 in earnings, the second highest earnings in their history.

In 2008 Knob Hill Stables saw less success than years prior. Their only major stake win for the season was Nicki Knew, which won the Boston City Stake. Overall, the Stables' earnings were down to US$608,000. The 2008 season would be the last season that Knob Hill Stables won a major stake competition. Over the next four years the breeding program Stavro championed would slow and overall stable inventory dropped sharply. The horses still racing were mainly holdovers from the 2007/2008 season. 2012 would be the last year that the Stable entered horses into racing competitions.

In its 40-year career, Knob Hill Stable proved to be one of the premiere Canadian stables. Throughout its history, it produced 85 stakes winners that raced throughout North America and Europe. Knob Hill Stables remains one of the few Canadian stables to win the Thoroughbred Owners and Breeders Association award for the top owner horse breeder in North America.

== Facilities ==
- Newmarket, Ontario - 100-acre (0.40 km^{2}) breeding and training facility and Canadian headquarters
- Kentucky - 300-acre (1.2 km^{2}) US breeding and training facilities
