= Swynford Stakes =

- Class: Discontinued stakes
- Location: Woodbine Racetrack; Toronto, Ontario, Canada
- Inaugurated: 1956
- Race type: Thoroughbred - Flat racing

Race information
- Distance: 6 furlongs (2016)
- Surface: Dirt
- Track: left-handed
- Qualification: Two-year-olds
- Weight: Allowances

Swynford Stakes is a discontinued Canadian Thoroughbred horse race held annually from 1956 through 2016. It was first run at Greenwood Raceway as a race for horses aged three and older. In 1967 it was moved to Woodbine Racetrack where it was changed to a race for two-year-olds. It received Grade 3 status for 1999 and 2000.

== Historical notes ==
The 1958 Swynford Stakes was won by Nearctic who was a son of the great undefeated runner and one of the most influential sires in history, Nearco. Bred by E. P. Taylor at his Windfields Farm in Ontario, Nearctic would earn 1958 Canadian Horse of the Year honours and induction in the Canadian Horse Racing Hall of Fame. However, Nearctic's most important achievement came when he sired the greatest sire of the 20th Century, the now legendary Northern Dancer.

Jockey Dave Penna won the 1982 edition of the Swynford Stakes aboard Sunny's Halo, a colt who went on to win the 1983 Kentucky Derby. In 2008, the race produced its second Kentucky Derby winner when jockey Chantal Sutherland guided Mine That Bird to a Swynford victory.

The 1997 Belmont Stakes winner Touch Gold ran second to Holzmeister in the 1996 running of the Swynford.

The Swynford Stakes was run at various distances:

At Greenwood Raceway:

- 1956 : 6 furlongs
- 1957 : 6 1/2 furlongs
- 1958-1960 : 7 furlongs
- 1961-1966 : 1 mile

At Woodbine Racetrack:

- 1967-1970 : 5 furlongs
- 1971-1972 : 5 1/2 furlongs
- 1973–1975, 2016 : 6 furlongs
- 1976-1979 : 5 furlongs
- 1980-1985 : 7 furlongs

1986-1995 : 6 1/2 furlongs 1996 to 2015 : 7 furlongs

== Records ==
Speed record: (at distance of 7 furlongs)

- 1:23.00 - Holzmeister (1996) (recorded in fractions of 1/5 seconds)
- 1:23.02 - Turf War (2007)

Most wins by a jockey:

- 5 - Robin Platts (1968, 1971, 1976, 1978, 1992)

Most wins by a trainer:

- 6 - Mark E. Casse (1999, 2002, 2007, 2012, 2013, 2014)

Most wins by an owner:

- 2 - Lanson Farm (1956, 1960)
- 2 - Windfields Farm (1958, 1987)
- 2 - Stafford Farms (1976, 1978)
- 2 - John C. Oxley (2011, 2012)
- 2 - Conquest Stables (2013, 2014)

== Winners ==
Year	Winner	Age	Jockey	Trainer	Owner	Time	Win$	Gr.
2016	Undulated	2	Andy Garcia	Cathal A. Lynch	M M G Stables	6 F	1:10.26	$75,000
2015	Riker	2	Jesse M. Campbell	Nick Gonzalez	Tucci Stables	7 F	1:23.39	$75,000
2014	Conquest Boogaloo	2	Patrick Husbands	Mark E. Casse	Conquest Stables	7 F	1:23.97	$90,000
2013	Conquest Titan	2	Eurico da Silva	Mark E. Casse	Conquest Stables	7 F	1:23.64	$75,000
2012	Uncaptured	2	Patrick Husbands	Mark Casse	John C. Oxley	7 F	1:22.49	$113,400
2011	Indian Evening	2	Tyler Pizarro	Josie Carroll	John C. Oxley	7 F	1:22.57	$90,000
2010	Bears Future	2	Gerry Olguin	Reade Baker	Bear Stables	7 F	1:23.58	$90,000
2009	Ghost Fleet	2	Todd Kabel	Sid C. Attard	Jim Dandy Stable	7 F	1:23.20	$103,500
2008	Mine That Bird	2	Chantal Sutherland	David Cotey	Dominion Bloodstock et al.	7 F	1:23.52	$90,000
2007	Turf War	2	Patrick Husbands	Mark E. Casse	Woodford Racing LLC	7 F	1:23.02	$75,000
2006	Barilko	2	Constant Montpellier	David Dwyer	David Dwyer	7 F	1:24.65	$75,000
2005	Bear Character	2	Jim McAleney	Dale Greenwood	Bear Stables Ltd.	7 F	1:23.83	$83,632
2004	What's Up Dude	2	Patrick Husbands	Mike Mareina	Kuehne Racing	7 F	1:24.67	$81,600
2003	Winter Whiskey	2	Jono Jones	Catherine Day Phillips	Ten Goal Racing et al.	7 F	1:25.08	$80,550
2002	Added Edge	2	Patrick Husbands	Mark E. Casse	Robert Wilson/Valor	7 F	1:23.33	$83,948
2001	Rare Friends	2	David Clark	Robert P. Tiller	F. DiGiulio, Jr. & Tiller	7 F	1:25.83	$65,940
2000	Highland Legacy	2	Emile Ramsammy	Steve Owens	Empress Stable	7 F	1:23.64	$67,032
1999	Exciting Story	2	Emile Ramsammy	Mark E. Casse	Mockingbird Farm	7 F	1:23.05	$48,645
1998	Riddell's Creek	2	James McKnight	Beverly Buck	Clausen/Buck/Buck	7 F	1:25.00	$40,711
1997	Thunder Bow	2	Todd Kabel	Rita A. Schnitzler	J. M. Stritzl Stable	7 F	1:25.40	$39,060
1996	Holzmeister	2	Robert Landry	Daniel J. Vella	Frank Stronach	7 F	1:23.00	$67,740
1995	Hard Rock Crossing	2	Emile Ramsammy	Robert P. Tiller	Tiller/Norseman Stable	6.5 F	1:17.20	$49,635
1994	Talkin Man	2	Don Seymour	Roger Attfield	Kinghaven / Stollery	6.5 F	1:16.60	$39,240
1993	Pulled Through	2	Larry Attard	Tino Attard	Tanya Attard / Dav Stable	6.5 F	1:17.20	$33,768
1992	Reach The Gold	2	Robin Platts	John A. Ross	Huntington Stud Farm	6.5 F	1:18.60	$39,960
1991	Frosted Spy	2	Mickey Walls	Frank Passero, Jr.	Pedigree/Sunny Acre	6.5 F	1:19.40	$39,888
1990	Dark Brew	2	David Pugh	Jack R. Wilson	Robert & Saronda Smith & Jack R. Wilson	6.5 F	1:17.40	$39,816
1989	Dandy Shine	2	Lloyd Duffy	William R. MacKinnon	John Royle	6.5 F	1:18.00	$40,104
1988	Mercedes Won	2	Lloyd Duffy	Arnold Fink	Chris Spencer	6.5 F	1:17.00	$34,170
1987	Silver Deputy	2	Irwin Driedger	Mac Benson	Windfields Farm	6.5 F	1:17.20	$32,100
1986	Bell Lap	2	Jack Lauzon	Richie Papa	Carravetta / Rundle	6.5 F	1:19.00	$25,872
1985	Color Me Smart	2	Jeffrey Fell	James E. Day	Sam-Son Farm	7 F	1:27.00	$38,112
1984	Rulers Sceptre	2	Gary Stahlbaum	Joe Attard	N. Dickinson	7 F	1:24.60	$26,736
1983	Let's Go Blue	2	Sid Fenech	Janet Bedford	Jim Dandy Stable	7 F	1:24.20	$26,784
1982	Sunny's Halo	2	Dave Penna	David C. Cross Jr.	David J. Foster	7 F	1:23.80	$22,890
1981	Son of Briartic	2	Dave Dennie	Jerry Lavigne	Paddockhurst Stable	7 F	1:23.60	$16,395
1980	Native Fisher	2	David Clark	Gordon Huntley	S. Young & A. Fisher	7 F	1:26.20	$17,455
1979	Classic Joker	2	George HoSang	Brian Ottaway	Mrs. C. McCullough	5 F F	0:58.60	$14,560
1978	Port Master	2	Robin Platts	Gil Rowntree	Stafford Farms	5 F F	0:59.00	$13,880
1977	Buck Mountain	2	Gary Stahlbaum	Jim Roberts	S. Brener	5 F F	0:58.40	$14,225
1976	Sound Reason	2	Robin Platts	Gil Rowntree	Stafford Farms	5 F F	0:58.60	$10,710
1975	First	2	Jeffrey Fell	Yonnie Starr	Jean-Louis Levesque	6 F	1:11.60	$11,000
1974	Greek Answer	2	Wayne Green	Frank Merrill Jr.	W. Preston Gilbride	6 F	1:10.40	$11,480
1973-1	Bedknob	2	Richard Grubb	Gordon Huntley	R. Papa	6 F	1:09.20	$7,012
1973-2	Amazing Journey	2	Sandy Hawley	Jerry C. Meyer	Vallelonga Stable	6 F	1:11.40	$7012
1972	Sunny South	2	Sandy Hawley	Frank Merrill, Jr.	Mrs. C. Hardwicke	5.5 F	1:04.00	$7,850
1971	Jewel Prince	2	Robin Platts	Carl F. Chapman	Garden City Stable	5.5 F	1:04.40	$7,325
1970	Overproof	2	Chris Rogers	Earl Harbourne	V. Martin, Jr.	5 F F	0:58.00	$7,050
1969	Andy The Great	2	Lloyd Duffy	William F. Edmiston	William F. Edmiston	5 F F	0:59.60	$8,175
1968	Moss Lodge	2	Robin Platts	Charles S. Softley	Charles S. Softley	5 F F	0:59.80	$7,150
1967	Great Cohoes	2	Ronnie Ferraro	John Rufrano	Armond J. Castellani	5 F F	0:58.80	$7,925
1966	Sunstruck	6	Avelino Gomez	Lou Cavalaris Jr.	Hillcrest Stable	8 F	1:36.40	$6,450
1965	President Jim	5	Avelino Gomez	Lou Cavalaris Jr.	Gardiner Farm	8 F	1:36.80	$7,200
1964	Folk Dancer	5	Ron Turcotte	Jerry C. Meyer	Edward B. Seedhouse	8 F	1:38.60	$7,025
1963	Lord Quillo	4	Sam McComb	Edward Mann	Sarto Desnoyers	8 F	1:38.20	$6,650
1962	Strongboy	6	Jim Fitzsimmons	Nick Julius	J. E. F. Seagram	8 F	1:37.80	$4,575
1961	Moony	5	Avelino Gomez	Frank Merrill, Jr.	Roxie Gian & Fred Tosch	8 F	1:37.40	$4,455
1960	Anita's Son	4	Pat Remillard	Arthur H. Warner	Lanson Farm	7 F	1:27.20	$4,350
1959	Kitty Girl	5	Roberto Gonzalez	Yonnie Starr	Larkin Maloney & Conn Smythe	7 F	1:25.00	$4,560
1958	Nearctic	4	Ben Sorensen	Gordon McCann	Windfields Farm	7 F	1:25.20	$5,320
1957	Canadian Champ	4	Dave Stevenson	John Passero	William R. Beasley	6.5 F	1:24.40	$3,640
1956	Fleet Path	4	H. B. Wilson	Arthur H. Warner	Lanson Farm	6 F	1:11.00	$3,605

*Run in two divisions in 1973.
