= Shepperton Stakes =

- Class: Restricted
- Location: Woodbine Racetrack; Toronto, Ontario, Canada
- Inaugurated: 1976
- Race type: Thoroughbred - Flat racing
- Website: www.woodbineentertainment.com

Race information
- Distance: 6.5 furlongs
- Surface: All-weather
- Track: left-handed
- Qualification: Three-year-olds and upward (Ontario Sire Stakes program)
- Weight: Allowances
- Purse: $100,000

The Shepperton Stakes is a Thoroughbred horse race run annually in early August at Woodbine Racetrack in Toronto, Ontario, Canada. An Ontario Sire Stakes, it is a restricted race for horses age three and older. Raced on all-weather synthetic dirt over a distance of six and one-half furlongs, the Shepperton Stakes currently carries a purse of $100,000.

The race is named in honor of Canadian Horse Racing Hall of Fame inductee, Shepperton. Inaugurated in 1976 as a 7 furlong race at Greenwood Raceway, the following year it was modified to its present 6.5 furlongs and shifted to the Fort Erie Racetrack where it remained until 1981 when it was moved to Woodbine Racetrack.

In 2005, Sophia's Prince's winning time broke a forty-four-year-old track record.

== Records ==
Speed record: (Through 1998, Woodbine times were recorded in fifths of a second. Since 1999 they are in hundredths of a second)

- 1:14.56 - Sophia's Prince (2005)

Most wins:

- 3 - Paso Dobles (2011, 2013, 2014)
- 3 - Pink Lloyd (2017, 2019, 2020)

Most wins by an owner:

- 3 - Centennial Farms (2011, 2013, 2014)
- 3 - Entourage Stable (2017, 2019, 2020)
- 2 - Kinghaven Farms (1984, 1997)
- 2 - Frank Stronach (1994, 1995)
- 2 - Bruno Schickedanz & John Hillier (1999, 2000)

Most wins by a jockey:

- 7 - David Clark (1978, 1980, 1983, 1986, 1888, 1996, 2006)

Most wins by a trainer:

- 6 - Robert P. Tiller (2003, 2006, 2008, 2017, 2019, 2020)
- 4 - Mark Casse (2010, 2011, 2013, 2014)

== Winners of the Shepperton Stakes ==
Year	Winner	Age	Jockey	Trainer	Owner	Time	Ref
2020	Pink Lloyd	8	Rafael Hernandez	Robert P. Tiller	Entourage Stable	1:16.44	
2019	Pink Lloyd	7	Eurico Rosa Da Silva	Robert P. Tiller	Entourage Stable	1:15.40	
2018	Kingsport	6	Patrick Husbands	Sid Attard	Goldmart Farms/Royal Laser Racing Inc.	1:15.61	
2017	Pink Lloyd	5	Eurico Rosa Da Silva	Robert P. Tiller	Entourage Stable	1:15.03	
2016	Kingsport	4	Patrick Husbands	Sid Attard	Goldmart Farms/Royal Laser Racing Inc.	1:16.57	
2015	Phil's Dream	7	Justin Stein	Paul M. Buttigieg	Buttigieg Training Centre	1:14.74	
2014	Paso Dobles	8	Eurico Rosa Da Silva	Mark Casse	Centennial Farms/Craig Racing	1:16.58	
2013	Paso Dobles	7	Eurico Rosa da Silva	Mark Casse	Centennial Farms	1:16.39	
2012	Royal Egbert	4	Richard Dos Ramos	Paul Buttigieg	Paul Buttigieg	1:16.65	
2011	Paso Dobles	5	Patrick Husbands	Mark Casse	Centennial Farms	1:15.75	
2010	Grazettes Landing	5	Corey Fraser	Mark Casse	Melnyk Racing Stables	1:16.16	
2009	Drunken Love	4	Gerry Olguin	Norman J. McKnight	Tallyho Racing Ltd.	1:15.56	
2008	Dancer's Bajan	4	Corey Fraser	Robert P. Tiller	3 Sons Racing Stable	1:15.29	
2007	Main Executive	5	Richard Dos Ramos	Radlie Loney	Bruno Brothers Farms	1:16.77	
2006	Dave The Knave	4	David Clark	Robert P. Tiller	F. DiGiulio, Jr. & R. Tiller	1:30.55	
2005	Sophia's Prince	6	Simon Husbands	John LeBlanc, Jr.	Joan Agro	1:14.56	
2004	Krz Ruckus	7	Patrick Husbands	Mike DePaulo	New Venture Stable	1:16.37	
2003	Forever Grand	4	Patrick Husbands	Robert P. Tiller	F. DiGiulio, Jr. & R. Tiller	1:17.10	
2002	Runaway Love	5	Emile Ramsammy	Abraham Katryan	Brandon Brako St et al.	1:16.97	
2001	Hopeful Moment	5	Slade Callaghan	John LeBlanc, Jr.	Racing 2000 & Partners	1:15.85	
2000	One Way Love	5	Patrick Husbands	Abraham Katryan	B. Schickedanz & J. Hillier	1:15.45	
1999	One Way Love	4	Patrick Husbands	Michael Wright, Jr.	B. Schickedanz & J. Hillier	1:16.41	
1998	Deputy Inxs	7	Na Somsanith	Audre Cappuccitti	A. & G. Cappuccitti	1:16.40	
1997	Love Grows	5	Robert Landry	Roger Attfield	Kinghaven Farms	1:17.00	
1996	Jilin	4	David Clark	John P. MacKenzie	Greenoaks Farm	1:16.40	
1995	King Ruckus	5	Todd Kabel	Daniel J. Vella	Frank Stronach	1:16.20	
1994	King Ruckus	4	Todd Kabel	Daniel J. Vella	Frank Stronach	1:15.40	
1993	D'Or Ruckus	5	Sandy Hawley	Gordon Cowie	J.B.S. Racing Stable	1:16.00	
1992	Twist The Snow	6	Todd Kabel	Angus McArthur	Angus McArthur	1:15.80	
1991	King Corrie	3	Richard Dos Ramos	John A. Ross	Aubrey W. Minshall	1:16.80	
1990	Host Master	4	Sandy Hawley	John Cirillo	Arosa Stables	1:15.80	
1989	Regal Intention	4	Jack Lauzon	James E. Day	Sam-Son/Windfields	1:16.60	
1988	Highland Ruckus	3	David Clark	Tony Mattine	Linmac Farms	1:16.20	
1987	Bold Executive	3	Larry Attard	Gerry Belanger	Romeo/Marcello/Pedigree	1:17.20	
1986	Dance Corps	5	David Clark	Glenn Magnusson	Mr. & Mrs. C. Schwabe	1:17.40	
1985	Archregent	4	Gary Stahlbaum	Philip A. Gleaves	Richard R. Kennedy	1:15.80	
1984	Introspective	3	Jack Lauzon	John J. Tammaro, Jr.	Kinghaven Farms	1:16.60	
1983	Fiddle Dancer Boy	5	David Clark	James C. Bentley	John B. W. Carmichael	1:17.20	
1982	Juan de Fuca	4	Robin Platts	Roger Attfield	Norcliffe Stable	1:16.20	
1981	Northern Regent	4	David Dennie	Jerry G. Lavigne	Torsud Stable	1:17.20	
1980	My Only Love	3	David Clark	Phil England	Mrs. M. Sutherland	1:16.80	
1979	Neara Round	4	Robin Platts	J. Clark	F. Vlahovic	1:17.00	
1978	Viceera	3	David Clark	Glenn Magnusson	H. & L. Hindmarsh	1:18.00	
1977	Lucky Conn	4	Hugo Dittfach	Donnie Walker	Conn Smythe	1:19.80	
1976	Hopeful Answer	3	Gary Stahlbaum	Frank Merrill, Jr.	W. P. Gilbride	1:25.40	
