= Achievement Stakes =

- Class: Restricted Stakes
- Location: Woodbine Racetrack; Toronto, Ontario, Canada
- Inaugurated: 1953
- Race type: Thoroughbred - Flat racing
- Website: www.woodbineentertainment.com/qct/default.asp

Race information
- Distance: 6 furlongs
- Surface: All weather synthetic dirt
- Track: left-handed
- Qualification: Three-year-olds and up
- Weight: Allowances
- Purse: $75,000

The Achievement Stakes was a Canadian Thoroughbred horse race run annually at Woodbine Racetrack in Toronto, Ontario. An allowance race restricted to three-year-old horses foaled in the province of Ontario, it was run on Tapeta synthetic dirt over a distance of six furlongs.

First run as the Achievement Handicap at the Fort Erie Race Track in 1953, over the years the event was run on both dirt and turf and at a variety of distances:

- 1 1/16 miles on dirt : 1953–1957, 1968-1979 (Fort Erie Race Track)
- 1 mile on turf : 1958 (Fort Erie), 1959-1966 (Woodbine Racetrack)
- 1 mile on turf : 1967 (Fort Erie)
- 7 furlongs on dirt : 1980 (Woodbine Racetrack), 1981-1993 (Greenwood Raceway)
- 6 furlongs on dirt : 1994 to 2018 (Woodbine Racetrack)

In 2019, the race was replaced by the Greenwood Stakes.

== Records ==
Speed record:

- 1:08.33 - Tothemoonandback (2006) (at current distance of six furlongs)

Most wins by an owner:

- 5 - Edward P. and/or Winnifred Taylor and/or Windfields Farm (1954, 1955, 1957, 1961, 1979)

Most wins by a jockey:

- 6 - Sandy Hawley (1970, 1972, 1973, 1974, 1979, 1990)
- 6 - David Clark (1980, 1985, 1998, 2000, 2002, 2008)

Most wins by a trainer:

- 5 - Robert Tiller (1975, 2002, 2004, 2017, 2018)

== Winners ==
Year	Winner	Jockey	Trainer	Owner	Time
2018	Pink Lloyd	Eurico Rosa Da Silva	Robert Tiller	Entourage Stables	1:09.00
2017	Pink Lloyd	Eurico Rosa Da Silva	Robert Tiller	Entourage Stables	1:08.76
2016	Calgary Cat	Eurico Rosa Da Silva	Kevin Attard	Stephen Chesney & Cory S. Hoffman	1:10.66
2015	Calgary Cat	Eurico Rosa Da Silva	Kevin Attard	Stephen Chesney & Cory S. Hoffman	1:08.95
2014	Eighty Nine Red	Jesse Campbell	Michael P. De Paulo	John Russell & George Schramm	1:10.28
2013	Black Hornet	Justin Stein	Pat Parente	Joey Gee Thoroughbreds, Aldo Ventresca, Pat Parente	1:09.46
2012	Jenna's Wabbit	Eurico Rosa Da Silva	George Newland	Fortunato Galati	1:11.16
2011	Eternal Rule	David Clark	Sid C. Attard	Donald A. Myers	1:09.43
2010	Essence Hit Man	Chantal Sutherland	Larry Cappuccitti	A and G Racing Stable	1:10.01
2009	El Brujo	Patrick Husbands	Malcolm Pierce	Windways Farm Limited	1:09.21
2008	Stuck in Traffic	David Clark	Nick Gonzalez	M.A.D Racing/Martha Gonzalez	1:08.62
2007	Legal Move	Patrick Husbands	Mark E. Casse	Woodford Racing LLC	1:10.49
2006	Tothemoonandback	Jim McAleney	Reade Baker	Jim Aston, Robert Smithen, et al.	1:08.33
2005	Quick In Deed	Ray Sabourin	Abraham R. Katryan	Kelynack Racing Stable	1:11.68
2004	Twisted Wit	Steven Bahen	Robert Tiller	Ralph Davis	1:08.99
2003	Majestic Wisdom	Constant Montpellier	Chantal L. Paquette	Majestic Thoroughbreds	1:11.06
2002	Rare Friends	David Clark	Robert Tiller	Frank Digiulio Jr. & Robert Tiller	1:10.98
2001	Millennium Allstar	Robert Landry	Sue Leslie	Meehan/Sue Leslie & Curtis Joseph	1:11.51
2000	Wake At Noon	David Clark	Abraham R. Katryan	Bruno Schickedanz	1:10.33
1999	Sir Lloyd	Patrick Husbands	Reade Baker	L. Simpson et al.	1:10.11
1998	Vice n' Friendly	David Clark	Josie Carroll	Jim & Alice Sapara	1:10.80
1997	John The Magician	Ray Sabourin	John A. Ross	R.M.C. Stable	1:10.40
1996	Laredo	Todd Kabel	Daniel J. Vella	Frank Stronach	1:10.40
1995	Honky Tonk Tune	Robert Landry	Daniel J. Vella	Frank Stronach	1:11.80
1994	O'Martin	Dave Penna	Michael J. Doyle	Kingsbrook Farm	1:12.40
1993	Bold Anthony	Jim McAleney	Roger Attfield	Pedigree Farm	1:26.00
1992	Blitzer	Robert Landry	Daniel J. Vella	Frank Stronach	1:27.40
1991	Canadian Silver	Dave Penna	Michael J. Doyle	Pinejoy Stable	1:24.60
1990	Native Factor	Sandy Hawley	Phil England	Frank Stronach	1:24.60
1989	Key Spirit	Don Seymour	Roger Attfield	Kinghaven Farms	1:25.80
1988	Regal Intention	Jack Lauzon	James E. Day	Sam-Son Farm	1:25.20
1987	Steady Power	Richard Dos Ramos	Roger Attfield	Kinghaven Farms	1:23.60
1986	Silent Link	Richard Dos Ramos	Cliff Hopmans, Jr.	F. H. Sherman	1:26.20
1985	Pre Emptive Strike	David Clark	Arthur H. Warner	R. R. Kennedy/B. J. Cullen	1:26.20
1984	Scootch Over Ice	Robert King, Jr.	Carl F. Chapman	A. J. May	1:27.20
1983	Bompago	Larry Attard	John Cardella	Carl Cardella et al.	1:27.20
1982	Black Rule	John Bell	Emile Allain	Mrs. J. Josephson	1:26.40
1981	Frost King	Lloyd Duffy	Bill Marko	T. Smith & B. Marko	1:25.60
1980	My Only Love	David Clark	Phil England	Mrs. M. Sutherland	1:23.00
1979	Bold Agent	Sandy Hawley	Macdonald Benson	Windfields Farm	1:44.20
1978	Overskate	Robin Platts	Gil Rowntree	Stafford Farm	1:43.60
1977	Pro Consul	George HoSang	Brian Ottaway	Mrs. George McCullough	1:43.80
1976	Norcliffe	Jeffrey Fell	Roger Attfield	Norcliffe Stable	1:44.40
1975	Near the High Sea	Richard. Grubb	Robert Tiller	J. Laist & E. Fryman	1:44.60
1974	Native Aid	Sandy Hawley	Edward Mann	George C. Hendrie	1:46.20
1973	Come In Dad	Sandy Hawley	Conrad Cohen	H. Tenenbaum	1:43.20
1972	Nice Dancer	Sandy Hawley	Jerry G. Lavigne	Tom Morton & Harlequin	1:42.80
1971	Chatty Cavalier	Robin Platts	Lou Cavalaris, Jr.	Gardiner Farm	1:42.20
1970	Almoner	Sandy Hawley	Jerry G. Lavigne	Parkview Stable	1:44.60
1969	Jumpin Joseph	Avelino Gomez	Robert S. Bateman	Warren Beasley	1:42.60
1968	Phelodie	Hugo Dittfach	Nicholas Julius	J. E. F. Seagram	1:44.40
1967	Pine Point	Avelino Gomez	Jerry C. Meyer	Willow Downs Farm	1:39.00
1966	Ice Water	Avelino Gomez	Lou Cavalaris, Jr.	Gardiner Farm	1:35.40
1965	Victorian Era	Avelino Gomez	Lou Cavalaris, Jr.	A. Case	1:36.00
1964	Langcrest	Sam McComb	Edward Mann	Sydney J. Langill	1:37.00
1963	Son Blue	James Fitzsimmons	Willie Thurner	Wilfred J. Farr	1:36.00
1962	Sun Dan	James Fitzsimmons	Willie Thurner	Wilfred J. Farr	1:36.80
1961	Song of Even	James Fitzsimmons	Gordon J. McCann	Windfields Farm	1:37.00
1960	Naughty Flirt	Hugo Dittfach	Edward Mann	G. R. Gardiner/G. M. Bell	1:42.60
1959	Wonder Where	Al Coy	Yonnie Starr	Maloney & Smythe	1:38.60
1958	Foxy Phil	C. O'Brien	Arthur H. Warner	Lanson Farm	1:39.60
1957	Chopadette	Avelino Gomez	Gordon J. McCann	Winnifred Taylor	1:44.80
1956	Canadian Champ	David Stevenson	John Passero	William R. Beasley	1:47.00
1955	Board of Trade	Pat Remillard	James C. Bentley	Winnifred Taylor	1:48.20
1954	Queen's Own	Jose Vina	Gordon J. McCann	E. P. Taylor	1:44.60
1953	Chain Reaction	Nick Combest	Richard Townrow	Mrs. Elodie Tomlinson	1:44.00
