= Vigil Stakes =

- Class: Grade III
- Location: Woodbine Racetrack; Toronto, Ontario, Canada
- Inaugurated: 1956
- Race type: Thoroughbred - Flat racing
- Website: www.woodbineentertainment.com

Race information
- Distance: 6 furlongs
- Surface: Tapeta synthetic dirt
- Track: Left-handed
- Qualification: Three-year-olds & up
- Weight: 120 pounds for three-year-olds, 124 pounds for older horses with allowances
- Purse: Can$150,000 (since 2002)

The Vigil Stakes is a thoroughbred horse race run annually at Woodbine Racetrack in Toronto, Ontario, Canada. It is a Grade III sprint race open to horses aged three and older with a purse of Can$150,000. It is currently run in late July over a distance of 6 furlongs on Woodbine's Tapeta (synthetic dirt) surface.

Inaugurated as the Vigil Handicap, it was first run in 1956 at Fort Erie Race Track where it remained until 1980. Since inception it has been contested at various distances:

- 5.5 furlongs :1956-1958
- 6 furlongs: 1959
- 6.5 furlongs: 1960
- 1 1/16 miles (8.5 furlongs): 1961-1979
- 7 furlongs: 1980–2017, 2025-Present
- 6 furlongs: 2018–2024

== Records ==
Speed record: (Through 1998, Woodbine times were recorded in fifths of a second. Since 1999 they are in hundredths of a second)

- 1:08.06 - Pink Lloyd (2020) (at current distance of 6 furlongs)
- 1:20.07 - Hollywood Hit (2009) (at distance of 7 furlongs)

Most wins:

- 4 - Pink Lloyd (2017, 2018, 2019, 2020)

Most wins by an owner:

- 4 - Gardiner Farm (1969, 1970, 1973, 1974)
- 4 - Entourage Stable (2017, 2018, 2019, 2020)

Most wins by a jockey:

- 5 - Robin Platts (1969, 1974, 1976, 1981, 1987)

Most wins by a trainer:

- 6 - Lou Cavalaris, Jr. (1964, 1966, 1969, 1970, 1973, 1974)
- 6 - Rober P. Tiller (2017, 2018, 2019, 2020, 2023, 2024)

== Winners ==
Year	Winner	Age	Jockey	Trainer	Owner	Time
2026	Heavy Pour	5	Gaddiel A. Martinez	Tim Girten	Richard H. Bosshard Jr.	1:22.06
2025	Simcoe	5	Rafael Manuel Hernandez	Katerina Vassilieva	Chiefswood Stables Limited	1:21.19
2024	Patches O'Houlihan	4	Sofia Vives	Robert P. Tiller	Frank D. Di Giulio Jr.	1:08.88
2023	Patches O'Houlihan	3	Daisuke Fukumoto	Robert P. Tiller	Frank D. Di Giulio Jr.	1:09.16
2022	Lucky Score	4	Leo Salles	W. V. Armata	Dominic Liscio & Danny Iandoli	1:08.63
2021	Souper Stonehenge	5	Patrick Husbands	Mark E. Casse	Live Oak Plantation	1:09.52
2020	Pink Lloyd	8	Rafael Manuel Hernandez	Robert P. Tiller	Entourage Stable	1:08.06
2019	Pink Lloyd	7	Eurico Rosa da Silva	Robert P. Tiller	Entourage Stable	1:08.68
2018	Pink Lloyd	6	Eurico Rosa da Silva	Robert P. Tiller	Entourage Stable	1:09.26
2017	Pink Lloyd	5	Eurico Rosa da Silva	Robert P. Tiller	Entourage Stable	1:22.18
2016	Passion for Action	4	Eurico Rosa Da Silva	Michael P. De Paulo	Benjamin Hutzel	1:21.65
2015	Black Hornet	5	Luis Contreras	Pat Parente	Joey Gee Thoroughbreds & Aldo Ventresca	1:21.70
2014	Really Sharp	4	Steven Ronald Bahen	Ian Black	N & R Kaster	1:21.83
2013	Laugh Track	4	Luis Contreras	Mark E. Casse	Gary Barber & WinStar Farm	1:21.85
2012	Essence Hit Man	5	Jesse Campbell	Audre Cappuccitti	Audre & Cappuccitti	1:22.28
2011	Stunning Stag	7	Gerry Olguin	Sid Attard	Janice Attard	1:22.15
2010	Hollywood Hit	4	Jim McAleney	Terry Jordan	Peter Redekop	1:20.07
2009	Field Commission	4	Tyler Pizarro	Daniel J. Vella	Daniel J. Vella & Solera Farm	1:22.74
2008	Disfunction	4	Emile Ramsammy	Julia Carey	J M J's Stable & Weila Ye	1:20.51
2007	Just Rushing	6	Emma-Jayne Wilson	Sid C. Attard	Tucci Stables	1:23.87
2006	Judiths Wild Rush	5	James McAleney	Reade Baker	Tenenbaum Racing Stable	1:22.51
2005	Judiths Wild Rush	4	Slade Callaghan	Reade Baker	Tenenbaum Racing Stable	1:23.19
2004	Mobil	4	Todd Kabel	Mike Keogh	Gus Schickedanz	1:21.81
2003	Wake At Noon	6	Emile Ramsammy	Abraham R. Katryan	Bruno Schickedanz	1:23.25
2002	Wake At Noon	5	Emile Ramsammy	Abraham R. Katryan	Bruno Schickedanz	1:23.13
2001	Exciting Story	4	Patrick Husbands	Mark E. Casse	Mockingbird Farm Inc	1:23.49
2000	One Way Love	5	Patrick Husbands	Abraham R. Katryan	Bruno Schickedanz & John Hillier	1:22.66
1999	Deputy Inxs	8	Na Somsanith	Audre Cappuccitti	Audre & Gordon Cappuccitti	1:23.54
1998	Deputy Inxs	7	Na Somsanith	Audre Cappuccitti	Audre & Gordon Cappuccitti	1:22.40
1997	Kiridashi	5	Mickey Walls	Barbara Minshall	Minshall Farms	1:21.80
1996	Kiridashi	4	Sandy Hawley	Barbara Minshall	Minshall Farms	1:22.80
1995	Sea Wall	4	Richard Dos Ramos	Barbara Minshall	Minshall Farms	1:23.00
1994	Berry Moonolow	5	James McKnight	Gordon Cowie	Kings Lane Farm	1:21.80
1993	Canadian Silver	5	Dave Penna	Michael J. Doyle	Pinejoy Stable	1:23.40
1992	Hawk In Flight	6	Todd Kabel	Laurie Silvera	Silverbrook Stable	1:24.20
1991	Key Spirit	5	Mickey Walls	Stephen Barnes	Big Bux Stable	1:25.00
1990	Mr. Hot Shot	5	James McAleney	William Stewart	Jimmy Stewart & Michelle Upton	1:23.60
1989	Mr. Hot Shot	4	James McAleney	William Stewart	Jimmy Stewart & Michelle Upton	1:23.40
1988	Jamaican Gigolo	5	J. Paul Souter	Robert E. Fisher	Rodger Bawden	1:23.40
1987	Play The King	4	Robin Platts	Roger Attfield	Kinghaven Farms	1:25.40
1986	Regal Remark	4	Irwin Driedger	James E. Day	Sam-Son Farm	1:24.40
1985	Jacksboro	6	David Clark	Tony Mattine	Elizabeth Hunt Curnes	1:24.40
1984	My Only Love	7	Gary Stahlbaum	Phil England	Phil England (lessee)	1:26.20
1983	Jacksboro	4	David Clark	Tony Mattine	Nelson Bunker Hunt	1:22.60
1982	Great Gladiator	5	Larry Attard	Steve Attard	Tom Campbell	1:23.00
1981	Von Clausewitz	4	Robin Platts	Roger Attfield	Norcliffe Stables	1:22.60
1980	Stutz Bearcat	5	George HoSang	James E. Day	Sam-Son Farm	1:25.20
1979	Knight's Turn †	4	John Bell	Emile M. Allain	Constance Terfloth	1:45.80
1978	Giboulee	4	George HoSang	Jacques Dumas	Joe & Don Johnson	1:45.00
1977	Coverack	4	George HoSang	John J. Tammaro, Jr.	Kinghaven Farm	1:44.60
1976	Brilliant Sandy	4	Robin Platts	Jerry C. Meyer	Smith/Willow Downs Farm	1:44.80
1975	Spirit Rock	6	Gunnar Lindberg	Arthur H. Warner	Sam-Son Farm	1:46.40
1974	Henry Tudor	5	Robin Platts	Lou Cavalaris, Jr.	Gardiner Farm	1:42.60
1973	Sea Rider	4	Avelino Gomez	Lou Cavalaris, Jr.	Gardiner Farm	1:44.00
1972	Cool Moon	4	Avelino Gomez	Frank Merrill, Jr.	W. P. Gilbride	1:44.60
1971	Rouge Chanteur	4	Richard Grubb	James Mort Hardy	Prime Acres Stable	1:45.80
1970	Perfect Tan	5	Richard Armstrong	Lou Cavalaris, Jr.	Gardiner Farm	1:44.00
1969	James Bay	5	Robin Platts	Lou Cavalaris, Jr.	Gardiner Farm	1:46.80
1968	The Cheat	5	Richard Grubb	Jim Fisher	Ward C. Pitfield, Jr.	1:45.40
1967	Gauchesco	6	Frank Barroby	Andrew G. Smithers	Dane Hill Acres	1:43.80
1966	Sunstruck	6	Avelino Gomez	Lou Cavalaris, Jr.	Hillcrest Stable	1:43.20
1965	Sunny	5	Keith Robinson	Warren Beasley	William R. Beasley	1:44.00
1964	Vindent de Paul	6	Avelino Gomez	Lou Cavalaris, Jr.	Hillcrest Stable	1:45.20
1963	Lord Quillo	4	Sam McComb	Edward Mann	Sarto Desnoyers	1:43.80
1962	Axeman	4	Hugo Dittfach	Richard Townrow	Lanson Farm	1:44.40
1961	Moony	5	Hugo Dittfach	Frank Merrill, Jr.	Roxie Gian & Fred Tosch	1:48.00
1960	Anita's Son	4	Hugo Dittfach	Arthur H. Warner	Lanson Farm	1:17.00
1959	Nearctic	5	Ben Sorensen	Gordon J. McCann	Windfields Farm	1:10.60
1958	Nearctic	4	Ben Sorensen	Gordon J. McCann	Windfields Farm	1:05.40
1957	Pot Hunter	6	Herb Lindberg	Yonnie Starr	Maloney & Smythe	1:05.20
1956	Fleet Path	4	H. B. Wilson	Arthur H. Warner	Lanson Farm	1:07.40

- † In 1979, Coverack finished first but was disqualified and set back to third.

== See also ==
- List of Canadian flat horse races
