= Jacques Cartier Stakes =

- Class: Grade III
- Location: Woodbine Racetrack; Toronto, Ontario, Canada
- Inaugurated: 1954
- Race type: Thoroughbred - Flat racing
- Website: www.woodbineentertainment.com/qct/default.asp

Race information
- Distance: 6 furlongs
- Surface: Tapeta
- Track: left-handed
- Qualification: Four-Years-Old & Up
- Weight: Allowances
- Purse: Can$150,000
- Bonuses: $30,000 Ontario-bred

The Jacques Cartier Stakes is a Thoroughbred horse race run annually since 1954 at Woodbine Racetrack in Toronto, Ontario, Canada. Run near the beginning of the Woodbine spring meeting, the sprint race is open to horses aged four and older and is run over a distance of six furlongs on Tapeta synthetic dirt. In 2019, it became a Grade III stakes race and the purse has been subsequently increased to Can$150,000 with an additional $30,000 available for Ontario-bred horses.

Inaugurated in 1954 at the now defunct Greenwood Raceway in Toronto, the Jacques Cartier Stakes is named in honour of the French explorer, Jacques Cartier. It was raced at Woodbine Racetrack from 1956 through 1967 after which it was hosted by Fort Erie Racetrack through 1975. In 1976 the race returned to Greenwood Raceway where it remained through 1993. It returned to its prest location at Woodbine Racetrack in 1994.

The race was run in two divisions in 1984.

Since inception it has been contested at various distances:

- 6 furlongs : 1954-1975, 1994–present
- 6.5 furlongs : 1976
- 7 furlongs : 1977-1993

== Records ==
Speed record: (Through 1998, Woodbine times were recorded in fifths of a second. Since 1999 they are in hundredths of a second)

- 1:08.05 - Pink Lloyd (2018) (at current distance of 6 furlongs)

Most wins:

- 4 - Pink Lloyd (2017, 2018, 2019,2020)

Most wins by an owner:

- 4 - Sam-Son Farm (1973, 1990, 1995, 2000)
- 4 - Entourage Stables (2017, 2018, 2019, 2020)

Most wins by a jockey:

- 6 - Avelino Gomez (1956, 1957, 1959, 1961, 1973, 1977)
- 6 - Robin Platts (1974, 1975, 1978, 1979, 1980, 1987)

Most wins by a trainer:

- 5 - Robert P. Tiller (2003, 2017, 2018, 2019, 2020)

== Winners ==
Year	Winner	Age	Jockey	Trainer	Owner	Time
2026	Possiblemente	6	Eswan Flores	Joe Sharp	T and E Racing (Taylor A. Logan	1:10.01
2025	Old Chestnut	8	Eswan Flores	Martin Drexler	Bruno Schickedanz	1:08.17
2024	Flag Of Honour (AUS)	5	Kazushi Kimura	Julia Carey	R. M. Wanless and Mrs. J. M. Wanless	1:09.79
2023	Anarchist	4	Luis Contreras	Josie Carroll	Ilium Stables	1:08.96
2022	Arzak	4	Kazushi Kimura	Michael J. Trombetta	Sonata Stable	1:08.91
2021	Souper Stonehenge	5	Patrick Husbands	Mark E. Casse	Live Oak Plantation	1:08.89
2020	Pink Lloyd	8	Rafael Manuel Hernandez	Robert P. Tiller	Entourage Stables	1:09.61
2019	Pink Lloyd	7	Eurico Rosa Da Silva	Robert P. Tiller	Entourage Stables	1:08.55
2018	Pink Lloyd	6	Eurico Rosa Da Silva	Robert P. Tiller	Entourage Stables	1:08.05
2017	Pink Lloyd	5	Eurico Rosa Da Silva	Robert P. Tiller	Entourage Stables	1:08.62
2016	Passion for Action	4	Eurico Rosa Da Silva	Michael P. De Paulo	Benjamin Hutzel	1:09.75
2015	Calgary Cat	5	Eurico Rosa Da Silva	Kevin Attard	Chesney/Hoffman	1:08.98
2014	Dan the Tin Man	4	David Garcia	Ricky Griffith	Debmar Stables	1:09.75
2013	Essence Hit Man	6	Jesse M. Campbell	Sylvain Pion	A & G Racing Stable	1:08.83
2012	Essence Hit Man	5	Jesse M. Campbell	Audre Cappuccitti	Audre & Gordon Cappuccitti	1:09.26
2011	Essence Hit Man	4	Jesse M. Campbell	Audre Cappuccitti	Audre and Gordon Cappuccitti	1:08.16
2010	Hollywood Hit	4	James McAleney	Daniel O'Callaghan	Peter Redekop	1:08.99
2009	Disfunction	5	Emile Ramsammy	Julia Carey	JMJ's Stable & Weila Ye	1:08.62
2008	Legal Move	4	Simon Husbands	Mark Casse	Woodford Racing LLC	1:08.63
2007	Stradivinsky	4	Emma-Jayne Wilson	Malcolm Pierce	Live Oak Plantation Racing	1:09.68
2006	Judiths Wild Rush	5	James S. McAleney	Reade Baker	Tenenbaum Racing	1:09.17
2005	Ministers Wild Cat	5	Todd Kabel	Scott H. Fairlie	I. & M. Cowan et al.	1:09.67
2004	Chris's Bad Boy	7	Jono Jones	Vito Armata	Alpine Stable	1:08.75
2003	Rare Friends	4	Patrick Husbands	Robert P. Tiller	Frank Digiulio, Jr.	1:11.22
2002	Wake At Noon	5	Emile Ramsammy	Abraham R. Katryan	Bruno Schickedanz	1:10.26
2001	Wake At Noon	4	David Clark	Abraham R. Katryan	Bruno Schickedanz	1:09.53
2000	Randy Regent	6	Todd Kabel	Mark Frostad	Sam-Son Farm	1:10.00
1999	Transferred	4	Na Somsanith	Thomas R. Bowden	Colebrook Farm	1:10.00
1998	Cache In	5	Mickey Walls	David R. Bell	M. Oslanski & G. Smith	1:10.40
1997	Kiridashi	5	Mickey Walls	Barbara Minshall	Minshall Farms	1:09.80
1996	Demaloot Demashoot	6	Todd Kabel	Daniel J. Vella	Frank Stronach	1:09.40
1995	Double Glow	4	Sandy Hawley	Mark Frostad	Sam-Son Farm	1:10.60
1994	King Ruckus	4	Todd Kabel	Daniel J. Vella	Frank Stronach	1:08.80
1993	Lordly Ruckus	4	Robert Landry	Debiie Lockhurst	C. M. Stubbs	1:23.40
1992	Megas Vukefalos	4	Mickey Walls	Phil England	Knob Hill Stable	1:24.60
1991	Host Master	5	Don Seymour	Emile M. Allain	Arosa Stables	1:25.20
1990	Regal Intention	5	Sandy Hawley	James E. Day	Sam-Son Farm & Windfields Farm	1:23.80
1989	Overpeer	5	Robert King, Jr.	Trevor Swan	J. D. Cameron	1:24.80
1988	Bravest Shot	4	Irwin Driedger	Debi Lockhurst	Lorraine Stubbs	1:27.60
1987	Play the King	4	Robin Platts	Roger Attfield	Kinghaven Farms	1:24.00
1986	Ten Gold Pots	5	Dan Beckon	Gil Rowntree	B. K. Y. Stable	1:24.00
1985	Aeronotic	4	Jeffrey Fell	D. McCullough	Speedy Racing Stable	1:25.20
1984	My Only Love	7	Gary Stahlbaum	Phil England	Phil England (lessee)	1:25.20
1984	Sir Khaled	4	Richard Dos Ramos	Bill Marko	Reliable Stable & Bill Marko	1:26.20
1983	Regent Cat	5	Gary Stahlbaum	Phil England	Stieglan & Alexander	1:25.20
1982	Frost King	4	Lloyd Duffy	Bill Marko	Ted Smith & Bill Marko	1:25.40
1981	Someolio Man	4	Brian Swatuk	George M. Carter	J. Terdik	1:26.20
1980	Overskate	5	Robin Platts	Gil Rowntree	Stafford Farm	1:24.40
1979	Overskate	4	Robin Platts	Gil Rowntree	Stafford Farm	1:25.40
1978	Sound Reason	4	Robin Platts	Gil Rowntree	Stafford Farm	1:25.60
1977	Park Romeo	6	Avelino Gomez	Jerry G. Lavigne	Parkview Stable	1:28.20
1976	Park Romeo	5	Lloyd Duffy	Jerry G. Lavigne	Parkview Stable	1:19.40
1975	Conversation	4	Robin Platts	Lou Cavalaris, Jr.	Gardiner Farms	1:11.20
1974	Henry Tudor	5	Robin Platts	Lou Cavalaris, Jr.	Gardiner Farms	1:13.40
1973	Amber Stone	5	Avelino Gomez	Arthur H. Warner	Sam-Son Farm	1:10.00
1972	Step In Time	5	G. Gordon	Edward Mann	Valecrest Farm	1:13.40
1971	Aintee So Daintee	5	James Kelly	Edward Mann	Valecrest Farm	1:10.00
1970	Regal Dancer	6	Sandy Hawley	Frank Merrill, Jr.	S. Rotenberg	1:10.20
1969	Bow Shannon	4	G. Gibb	J. Gomez	Mrs. J. Cerullo	1:12.40
1968	Lady Taj	4	Richard Grubb	Lou Cavalaris, Jr.	Gardiner & Golden West Farm	1:11.80
1967	Victorian Era	5	Hugo Dittfach	Lou Cavalaris, Jr.	Windfields Farm	1:10.80
1966	E. Day	6	Noel Turcotte	Hume E. M. Pollock	Hume E. M. Pollock	1:10.60
1965	E. Day	5	Pat Remillard	Hume E. M. Pollock	Hume E. M. Pollock	1:10.40
1964	Roman Banquet	5	Nick Shuk	S. U. Ross	E. C. Pasquale	1:10.80
1963	Jammed Lucky	5	Keith Robinson	Yonnie Starr	Conn Smythe	1:11.00
1962	Hidden Treasure	5	George Gubbins	Robert S. Bateman	William R. Beasley	1:14.00
1961	Hidden Treasure	4	Avelino Gomez	Robert S. Bateman	William R. Beasley	1:10.60
1960	Theo Geo	4	G. Gordon	B. S. Chris	Mrs. B. S. Chris	1:13.20
1959	Top Tourn	6	Avelino Gomez	J. Hornsby	McMacken Stable	1:14.80
1958	Nearctic	4	Ben Sorensen	Gordon J. McCann	Windfields Farm	1:09.80
1957	Censor	4	Avelino Gomez	Gordon J. McCann	Winnifred Taylor	1:10.20
1956	Beau Bunty	5	Avelino Gomez	B. S. Chris	Mrs. B. S. Chris	1:12.00
1955	Canadiana	5	T. Johnson	Gordon J. McCann	E. P. Taylor	1:11.60
1954	Blue Scooter	4	T. Johnson	F. Higgins	J. R. Mclntyre	1:11.40

== See also ==
- List of Canadian flat horse races
