= Highlander Stakes =

- Class: Grade II
- Location: Woodbine Racetrack; Toronto, Ontario Canada
- Inaugurated: 1954
- Race type: Thoroughbred - Flat racing
- Website: woodbineentertainment.com

Race information
- Distance: 6 furlongs (1,200 m) sprint
- Surface: Turf
- Track: Left-handed
- Qualification: Three-years-old & up
- Weight: Allowance conditions
- Purse: $250,000 (since 2017)

The Highlander Stakes is a Thoroughbred horse race run annually at Woodbine Racetrack in Toronto, Ontario, Canada. Run in mid to late June, the Grade II race is open to horses aged three and older. Raced over a distance of six furlongs on turf, it currently offers a purse of $250,000.

Inaugurated in 1954 as the Highlander Handicap at Toronto's Greenwood Raceway, it was moved to Woodbine Racetrack in 1957. The race was contested on dirt through 2003 when it was moved to the turf for the 2004 edition. It has been run at a distance of six furlongs except for 1957 and 1958 when it was run at seven furlongs.

The race was upgraded to Grade II status for 2010, fell to a Grade III, and restored as a Grade II event in 2014. In 2018, the Jockey Club of Canada moved it to Grade I status.

The event was downgraded to Grade II in 2022.

== Records ==
Speed record: (through 1998, times were recorded in fifths of a second. Since 1999 they are in hundredths of a second)

- 1:07.13 - Long On Value (2018)

Most wins:

- 2 - Signature Red (2010, 2011)
- 2 - Stutz Bearcat (1979, 1980)
- 2 - Wake At Noon (2000, 2002)
- 2 - Soaring Free (2004, 2005)
- 2 - Smart Enough (2007, 2009)

Most wins by an owner:

- 6 - Sam-Son Farm (1973, 1978, 1979, 1980, 2004, 2005)

Most wins by a jockey:

- 4 - Todd Kabel (1997, 2003, 2004, 2005)

Most wins by a trainer:

- 4 - Lou Cavalaris, Jr. (1959, 1964, 1969, 1977)

== Winners ==
Year	Winner	Age	Jockey	Trainer	Owner	Time
2026	Miss Vyvyanne	6	Pietro Moran	Gail Cox	Ralph R. Murray and Calstar Farm	0.56.27
2025	Patches O'Houlihan	5	Sofia Vives	Robert P. Tiller	Frank D. Di Giulio, Jr.	1:08.39
2024	Filo Di Arianna (BRZ)	8	Kazushi Kimura	Mark E. Casse	Gary Barber, Wachtel Stable and Peter Deutsch	1:09.75
2023	Lucky Score	5	Sahin Civaci	Mark E. Casse	Gary Barber, Pantofel Stable, LLC and Wachtel Stable	1:07.86
2022	Bound For Nowhere	8	Pablo Morales	Wesley A. Ward	Wesley A. Ward	1:08.01
2021	Silent Poet	6	Justin Stein	Nicholas Rodriguez	Stronach Stables	1:07.98
2020	Not run due to the COVID-19 pandemic.					
2019	Wet Your Whistle	4	Alex Cintron	Michael J. Trombetta	David W. Palmer	1:07.88
2018	Long On Value	7	Florent Geroux	Brad H. Cox	Madaket Stables, Ten Strike Racing, Steveh Laymon	1:07.13
2017	Green Mask	6	Javier Castellano	Brad H. Cox	Abdullah Saeed Almaddah	1:07.59
2016	Passion for Action	4	Eurico da Silva	Michael P. De Paulo	Benjamin Hutzel	1:08.05
2015	Go Blue or Go Home	6	Alan Garcia	Reade Baker	Susan & Jim Hill	1:07.18
2014	Something Extra	6	Eurico da Silva	Gail Cox	Menary/Cox	1:07.78
2013	Go Blue Or Go Home	4	Luis Contreras	Reade Baker	Susan & Jim Hill	1:10.46
2012	Smokey Fire	7	Eurico da Silva	Sid Attard	Jim Dandy Stable	1:07.77
2011	Signature Red	5	Luis Contreras	Sid Attard	Norseman Racing Stable	1:09.00
2010	Signature Red	4	Chantal Sutherland	Sid Attard	Norseman Racing Stable	1:08.17
2009	Smart Enough	6	Jeremy Rose	John Fisher	Edith R. Dixon	1:08.26
2008	Heros Reward	6	Javier Castellano	Dale Capuano	Rob Ry Farm/Jayne Marie Slysz	1:08.02
2007	Smart Enough	4	Patrick Husbands	John Fisher	Edith R. Dixon	1:08.53
2006	Marco Be Good	4	Justin Stein	John A. Ross	Terra Farm	1:07.87
2005	Soaring Free	6	Todd Kabel	Mark Frostad	Sam-Son Farm	1:08.03
2004	Soaring Free	5	Todd Kabel	Mark Frostad	Sam-Son Farm	1:08.72
2003	Forever Grand	4	Todd Kabel	Robert P. Tiller	Frank DiGiulio Jr.	1:09.53
2002	Wake At Noon	5	Emile Ramsammy	Abraham Katryan	Bruno Schickedanz	1:09.72
2001	Mr. Epperson	6	James McKnight	Scott H. Fairlie	R. & S. Fairlie et al.	1:10.65
2000	Wake At Noon	3	David Clark	Abraham Katryan	Bruno Schickedanz	1:10.38
1999	Vice N' Friendly	4	Mickey Walls	Abraham Katryan	S. Sesook & D. Yarush	1:09.08
1998	Cocney Lass	3	Neil Poznansky	Darren Glennon	Rainbow End Racing et al.	1:09.60
1997	Glanmire	7	Todd Kabel	Mike Keogh	Kenny, O'Leary et al.	1:09.40
1996	Love Grows	4	Robert Landry	Roger Attfield	Kinghaven Farms	1:09.60
1995	Le Magister	4	Dave Penna	Bernard Girault	I. Jamieson	1:10.40
1994	Swamp King *	4	Robert Landry	Frank Montrose	Ridge Rock Farm	1:09.80
1994	End Sweep *	3	Chris McCarron	Kathy Patton-Casse	Harry T. Mangurian Jr.	1:09.80
1993	Premier Angel	4	Robert Landry	Dennis M. Erwin	William A. Sorokolit Sr.	1:10.80
1992	King Corrie	4	Dave Penna	Sherry Noakes	Aubrey W. Minshall	1:09.60
1991	Key Spirit	5	Mickey Walls	Stephen Barnes	Big Bux Stable	1:10.80
1990	Native Factor	3	Brian Swatuk	Phil England	Frank Stronach	1:09.80
1989	Mr. Hot Shot	4	Jim McAleney	William Stewart	J. Stewart / M. Upton	1:09.20
1988	Highland Ruckus	3	David Clark	Tony Mattine	Linmac Farms	1:09.40
1987	Play The King	4	Don Seymour	Roger Attfield	Kinghaven Farms	1:09.20
1986	Near The Storm	4	Dan Beckon	Jack Reid	Rose Hill Farms	1:10.60
1985	Centenarian	4	Brian Swatuk	Frank H. Merrill Jr.	Est. C. E. Pickering	1:10.40
1984	Introspective	3	Jack Lauzon	John Tammaro Jr.	Kinghaven Farms	1:09.40
1983	Fraud Squad	4	Dan Beckon	Bill Marko	Edward B. Seedhouse	1:09.80
1982	Great Gladiator	5	Larry Attard	Steve Attard	Tom Campbell	1:10.60
1981	Solo Guy	3	Brian Swatuk	Laurie Silvera	Gordon F. Hall	1:08.80
1980	Stutz Bearcat	5	George HoSang	James E. Day	Sam-Son Farm	1:09.20
1979	Stutz Bearcat	4	George HoSang	James E. Day	Sam-Son Farm	1:09.60
1978	Casanova Kid	5	Richard Grubb	James E. Day	Sam-Son Farm	1:09.80
1977	One Pound Sterling	5	Jeffrey Fell	Lou Cavalaris Jr.	Gardiner Farm	1:10.00
1976	Gurkhas Band	4	Robin Platts	Gil Rowntree	Stafford Farms	1:10.00
1975	Island Fling	4	Sandy Hawley	Jerry G. Lavigne	Parkview Stable	1:10.20
1974	Pocket Measure	4	James Kelly	Samuel G. Dixon	J. O. Pallett	1:11.20
1973	Don't Ask Me That	3	Gary Stahlbaum	Arthur H. Warner	Sam-Son Farm	1:10.00
1972	Briartic	4	James Kelly	Andrew Smithers	Bennett Farms	1:09.40
1971	Coup Landing	6	James Kelly	Andrew Smithers	Calvin H. Sturrock	1:10.00
1970	Muzledick	5	Richard Grubb	J. Mort Hardy	Prime Acres Stable	1:10.40
1969	James Bay	5	Johnny Sellers	Lou Cavalaris Jr.	Gardiner Farm	1:10.80
1968	No Reasoning	5	Wayne Chambers	Jerry G. Lavigne	Parkview Stable	1:11.00
1967	Chillicoot	5	Ronnie Ferraro	Stan U. Ross	Blue-C-Stable	1:09.60
1966	E. Day	6	Noel Turcotte	Hume E. M. Pollock	Hume E. M. Pollock	1:10.80
1965	Royal Tara	4	John LeBlanc	Glenn Magnusson	Stafford Farms	1:10.40
1964	Vindent de Paul	6	P. Maxwell	Lou Cavalaris Jr.	Hillcrest Stable	1:10.60
1963	Kisco Kid	5	Harlon Dalton	George C. Frostad	George C. Frostad	1:10.40
1962	Its Ann	6	Harrel Bolin	W. Moorhead	G. R. Woodrow	1:10.60
1961	Anita's Son	5	Hugo Dittfach	Arthur H. Warner	Lanson Farm	1:09.20
1960	Tyhawk	5	W. Marsh	Les Lear	Singer & Lear	1:10.20
1959	War Eagle	5	Clifford Potts	Lou Cavalaris Jr.	P. Del Greco	1:10.60
1958	Mister Jive	4	Johnny Longden	George M. Carter	J. L. Applebaum	1:22.00
1957	Nirdar	4	Al Coy	John J. Thorpe	J. E. Frowde Seagram	1:23.40
1956	Jimminy Baxter	6	Pat Remillard	James C. Bentley	B. R. Steen	1:10.60
1955	Canadiana	5	T. Johnson	Gordon J. McCann	E. P. Taylor	1:11.20
1954	Kentario	6	A. Nash	John Calhoun	Green Valley Stable	1:10.20

* In 1994 there was a dead heat for first.

== See also ==
- List of Canadian flat horse races
