= Overskate Stakes =

Thoroughbred horse race in Toronto

- Class: Restricted Stakes
- Location: Woodbine Racetrack; Toronto, Ontario Canada
- Inaugurated: 1997
- Race type: Thoroughbred - Flat racing
- Website: www.woodbineentertainment.com

Race information
- Distance: 7 1/2 furlong
- Surface: Inner turf course
- Track: left-handed
- Qualification: Three-years-old & up (Ontario Sire Stakes program)
- Weight: Allowances
- Purse: C$100,000

The Overskate Stakes is a Canadian Thoroughbred horse race run annually during the latter part of October at Woodbine Racetrack in Toronto, Ontario. An Ontario Sire Stakes, it is a restricted race for horses age three and older. It is currently contested over a distance of 7 1/2 furlongs on Woodbine's inner turf course with a purse of C$100,000.

Inaugurated in 1997, it is named in honor of Overskate, a Canadian Horse Racing Hall of Fame horse who holds the record for most Sovereign Award with nine.

Prior to 2020, the race was run on the main track at a distance of 7 furlongs.

== Records ==
Speed record:

- 1:20.54 - Verne's Baby (2006) - 7 furlongs on dirt

Most wins:

- 2 - Krz Ruckus (2001, 2002)

Most wins by a jockey:

- 3 - Eurico Rosa da Silva (2014, 2016, 2017)
- 3 - Justin Stein (2011, 2012, 2013)

Most wins by a trainer:

- 3 - Robert Tiller (2007, 2015, 2017)

Most wins by an owner:

- 2 - Buttigieg Training Centre (2011, 2013, 2018)
- 2 - Ron Guidolin et al. (2001, 2002)
- 2 - Bruno Schickendanz (2009, 2016)

== Winners of the Overskate Stakes ==
Year	Winner	Age	Jockey	Trainer	Owner	Time	Ref
2020	Not So Quiet	5	Rafael Hernandez	Mark Casse	Heste Sport	1:31.03	
2019	Dixie's Gamble	4	Luis Contreras	Josie Carroll	Ivan Dalos	1:25.03	
2018	Thor's Rocket	5	Alan Garcia	Paul Buttigieg	Buttigieg training centre and Gus Viahos	1:22.48	
2017	Pink Lloyd	5	E. Rosa Da Silva	Robert Tiller	Entourage Stable	1:21.73	
2016	Touch of Disney		O. Moreno	N. McKnight	Bruno Schickendanz	1:21.51	
2015	Goodoldhockeygame		E. Rosa Da Silva	Robert Tiller	Frank Di Giulio Jr.	1:22.72	
2014	Paso Doble		E. Rosa Da Silva	M. Fournier	Centennial Farms	1:21.43	
2013	Phil's Dream		Justin Stein	P. Buttigieg	Buttigieg Training Centre	1:21.31	
2012	Bear's Peak		J. Stein	R. Baker	Bear Stables	1:22.46	
2011	Gypsy Ring		J. Stein	P. Buttigieg	Paul Buttigieg	1:21.54	
2010	Sand Cove		J. Jones	Roger Attfield	Ralph Johnson	1:22.33	
2009	Yummy With Butter	5	Tyler Pizarro	Mark Fournier	Bruno Schickedanz	1:22.15	
2008	Not Bourbon	3	Jono Jones	Roger Attfield	Charles E. Fipke	1:21.78	
2007	Dancer's Bajan	3	Corey Fraser	Robert P. Tiller	3 Sons Racing Stable	1:23.21	
2006	Verne's Baby	4	Emile Ramsammy	Sid C. Attard	G B Stable	1:20.54	
2005	Mister Coop	6	Emile Ramsammy	Daniel J. Vella	R.M.C. Stable	1:21.30	
2004	Barath	5	Harry Vega	Guadalupe Preciado	Tze On Yeung	1:23.06	
2003	Mulligan The Great	4	James McKnight	Cliff C. Hopmans	Charles E. Simmons	1:22.02	
2002	Krz Ruckus	5	Dino Luciani	Mike P. DePaulo	Ron Guidolin et al.	1:23.56	
2001	Krz Ruckus	4	Dino Luciani	Mike P. DePaulo	Ron Guidolin et al.	1:24.27	
2000	One Way Love	5	Patrick Husbands	Abraham R. Katryan	B. Schickedanz & J. Hillier	1:22.37	
1999	Randy Regent	5	Todd Kabel	Mark Frostad	Sam-Son Farms	1:22.40	
1998	Deputy Inxs	7	Na Somsanith	Audre Cappuccitti	Audre & Gordon Cappuccitti	1:23.20	
1997	Seismic Report	6	Mickey Walls	Joe Walls	Shelter Valley Farm	1:22.80	
