= Mazarine Stakes =

Thoroughbred horse race at Woodbine Racetrack in Toronto, Ontario, Canada

- Class: Grade III
- Location: Woodbine Racetrack; Toronto, Ontario
- Inaugurated: 1965
- Race type: Thoroughbred - Flat racing
- Website: web.archive.org/web/20100316214346/http://www.woodbineentertainment.com:80/qct/default.asp

Race information
- Distance: 1 1/16 miles (8.5 furlongs)
- Surface: Polytrack
- Track: left-handed
- Qualification: Two-year-old fillies
- Weight: Allowances
- Purse: $114,045 (approx)

The Mazarine Stakes is a Thoroughbred horse race at Woodbine Racetrack in Toronto, Ontario, Canada. A Grade III race, it is open to two-year-old fillies. Contested over a distance of 1 1/16 miles (8.5 furlongs) on Polytrack synthetic dirt, it currently carries a purse of approximately $114,045.

Run annually in October, the Mazarine Stakes is a prep race for the Breeders' Cup Juvenile Fillies.

Inaugurated in 1965 at Greenwood Raceway, in 1980 it was moved to its present location at Woodbine Racetrack. From 1975 through 1979 it was contested at a distance of one mile (8 furlongs). It was run in two divisions in 1979.

== Records ==
Speed record: (Through 1998, times were recorded in fifths of a second. Since 1999 they are in hundredths of a second)

- 1:43.15 - Knights Templar (2005) (at current distance of 1 1/16 miles)

Most wins by an owner:

- 4 - Sam-Son Farm (1986, 1990, 1995, 1999)

Most wins by a jockey:

- 8 - Patrick Husbands (2003, 2004, 2007, 2012, 2013, 2014, 2017, 2023)

Most wins by a trainer:

- 10 - Mark E. Casse (2004, 2007, 2012, 2013, 2014, 2016, 2017, 2021, 2022, 2023)

== Winners of the Mazarine Stakes ==
| Year | Winner | Jockey | Trainer | Owner | Time |
|---|---|---|---|---|---|
| 2026 | Sunday Finery | Sahin Civaci | James Bentley Begg | Walmac Farm, Jeff Begg, Annabel Begg, Eric Long and Bart Siegel | 1:44.29 |
| 2025 | Dixie Law | Rafael Manuel Hernandez | Dale A. Deruisseaux | Hillsbrook Farms | 1:46.71 |
| 2024 | Somethinabouther | Declan Cannon | Brendan P. Walsh | X-Men Racing IV LLC, Madaket Stables LLC and SF Racing LLC | 1:45.00 |
| 2023 | Witwatersrand | Patrick Husbands | Mark E. Casse | Gary Barber | 1:43.72 |
| 2022 | Renegade Rebel | Rafael M. Hernandez | Mark E. Casse | D. J. Stable | 1:44.80 |
| 2021 | Mrs. Barbara | Rafael M. Hernandez | Mark E. Casse | Spruce Stable | 1:44.64 |
| 2020 | Race Not Run | | | | |
| 2019 | Curlin's Voyage | Eurico Rosa da Silva | Jerome Lermyte | Hill 'n' Dale Farms & Windsor Boys Racing | 1:43.30 |
| 2018 | Tiz Breathtaking | Eurico Rosa da Silva | Michael Doyle | Windhaven Farms Inc. | 1:45.28 |
| 2017 | Wonder Gadot | Patrick Husbands | Mark E. Casse | Gary Barber | 1:44.14 |
| 2016 | Gale Force | Eurico Rosa da Silva | Mark E. Casse | Dixiana Farm LLC | 1:44.96 |
| 2015 | Gamble's Ghost | Luis Contreras | Josie Carroll | Ivan Dalos | 1:45.62 |
| 2014 | Conquest Harlanate | Patrick Husbands | Mark E. Casse | Conquest Stables | 1:45.22 |
| 2013 | Madly Truly | Patrick Husbands | Mark E. Casse | John C. Oxley | 1:44.89 |
| 2012 | Spring Venture | Patrick Husbands | Mark E. Casse | Gary Barber & Stoneway Farm | 1:46.74 |
| 2011 | Blue Heart | Joe Bravo | Brian Lynch | Amerman Racing | 1:44.86 |
| 2010 | Wyomia | Emile Ramsammy | Dan Vella | Beverly S. Anderson Edward A. Seltzer | 1:43.92 |
| 2009 | Biofuel | Eurico Rosa da Silva | Reade Baker | Brereton Jones | 1:44.47 |
| 2008 | Van Lear Rose | Chantal Sutherland | Catherine Day Phillips | Kingview Farms | 1:43.69 |
| 2007 | Officer Cherrie | Patrick Husbands | Mark E. Casse | Charles Laloggia | 1:46.49 |
| 2006 | Coy Coyote | Corey Fraser | Michael Dickinson | Harlequin Ranches | 1:47.30 |
| 2005 | Knights Templar | Jim McAleney | Daniel J. Vella | Clover IV Stables & Krista Seltzer | 1:43.15 |
| 2004 | Higher World | Patrick Husbands | Mark E. Casse | Sea Soft Stable | 1:47.99 |
| 2003 | Dream About | Patrick Husbands | Josie Carroll | Arosa Farms | 1:47.54 |
| 2002 | Brusque | Emile Ramsammy | Ronald A. Woods | Ronald A. Woods | 1:45.33 |
| 2001 | Lady Shari | Constant Montpellier | David Cotey | Dominion Bloodstock, Derek Bell, & Hugh Galbraith | 1:46.99 |
| 2000 | Salty You | Todd Kabel | Stanley Baresich | B & B Racing Stable | 1:45.37 |
| 1999 | Hello Seattle | Robert Landry | Mark Frostad | Sam-Son Farm | 1:45.63 |
| 1998 | Fantasy Lake | Robert Landry | Roger Attfield | Windhaven Farm | 1:44.80 |
| 1997 | Kirby's Song | Todd Kabel | Tino Attard | Kirby Canada Farm | 1:47.60 |
| 1996 | Barbed Wire | Emile Ramsammy | Barbara Minshall | Minshall Farms | 1:46.40 |
| 1995 | Silken Cat | Todd Kabel | Mark Frostad | Sam-Son Farm | 1:48.20 |
| 1994 | Honky Tonk Tune | Robert Landry | Daniel J. Vella | Stronach Stables | 1:46.80 |
| 1993 | Term Limits | Don Seymour | Roger Attfield | December Hill Farm | 1:47.20 |
| 1992 | Play All Day | Don Seymour | Roger Attfield | Kinghaven Farms | 1:47.40 |
| 1991 | Hope For A Breeze | Jack Lauzon | Don Campbell | Hopefield Farm | 1:47.60 |
| 1990 | Wilderness Song | Brian Swatuk | James E. Day | Sam-Son Farm | 1:44.60 |
| 1989 | Bundle Bits | Don Seymour | Roger Attfield | Kinghaven Farms | 1:45.80 |
| 1988 | Legarto | Irwin Driedger | Macdonald Benson | Windfields Farm | 1:46.40 |
| 1987 | Tis Michelle | Robert E. Colton | William Badgett, Jr. | J. Valentine | 1:48.00 |
| 1986 | Ruling Angel | Dave Penna | James E. Day | Sam-Son Farm | 1:47.40 |
| 1985 | Stage Flite | Dave Penna | Arthur Mullen | Stafford Farms | 1:46.80 |
| 1984 | Bessarabian | Gary Stahlbaum | Michael J. Doyle | Eaton Hall Farm | 1:47.00 |
| 1983 | Alison's Deeds * | John Bell | Emile Allain | Peter D. Fuller | 1:45.60 |
| 1982 | L'Epee | John Bell | Emile Allain | Terfloth Farms | 1:47.00 |
| 1981 | Avowal | Brian Swatuk | Arthur H. Warner | Richard R. Kennedy | 1:47.00 |
| 1980 | Lady Sheppard | George HoSang | Sid C. Attard | Mrs. R. Snelgrove | 1:48.00 |
| 1979 | Polite Lady | Hugo Dittfach | Arthur H. Warner | Roy A. Kennedy | 1:40.00 |
| 1979 | Flightish | Larry Attard | John Morahan | Gus Schickedanz | 1:41.40 |
| 1978 | Come Lucky Chance | J. Paul Souter | Donnie Walker | Conn Smythe | 1:40.20 |
| 1977 | Pottahawk | J. Burton | Edward Mann | Jim Dandy Stable | 1:39.80 |
| 1976 | Northernette | Sandy Hawley | Jerry C. Meyer | Syl Asadoorian, Sam Cosentino & Peter M. Brant | 1:37.00 |
| 1975 | Deep Meadow | Jeffrey Fell | S. Dixon | Windfields Farm | 1:39.60 |
| 1974 | Reasonable Win | Lloyd Duffy | Fred H. Loschke | Hammer Kopf Stable | 1:46.80 |
| 1973 | Lovely Sunrise | Sandy Hawley | Donnie Walker | Conn Smythe | 1:46.40 |
| 1972 | Impressive Lady | Hugo Dittfach | Edward Mann | Jack M. Brunton | 1:48.00 |
| 1971 | Flamme d'Or | Gary Stahlbaum | Frank Merrill, Jr. | Windfields Farm | 1:48.80 |
| 1970 | Main Pan | Noel Turcotte | Odie Clelland | Peter D. Fuller | 1:45.20 |
| 1969 | Foxy Parent | Avelino Gomez | W. F. Edmiston | W. F. Edmiston | 1:45.40 |
| 1968 | Amber Sherry | Richard Grubb | Gil Rowntree | Stafford Farms | 1:48.60 |
| 1967 | Winning Isle | M. Gibson | J. Mort Hardy | Prime Stable | 1:48.60 |
| 1966 | Jammed Lovely | James Fitzsimmons | Yonnie Starr | Conn Smythe | 1:45.00 |
| 1965 | Solar Park | Eric Walsh | Duke Campbell | Tom Hays/Weldon | 1:48.80 |

* In 1983, Constant Change finished first but was disqualified and set back to second.

== See also ==
- Road to the Kentucky Oaks
- List of Canadian flat horse races
