= New Providence Stakes =

- Class: Restricted Stakes
- Location: Woodbine Racetrack; Toronto, Ontario, Canada
- Inaugurated: 1982
- Race type: Thoroughbred - Flat racing
- Website: www.woodbineentertainment.com

Race information
- Distance: Six 6 furlongs sprint
- Surface: Tapeta
- Track: left-handed
- Qualification: Three-Years-Old & Up (Ontario Sire Stakes program)
- Weight: Allowances
- Purse: $100,000

The New Providence Stakes, last run in 2018, was a Canadian Thoroughbred horse race run annually in mid May at Woodbine Racetrack in Toronto, Ontario. An Ontario Sire Stakes, it was a restricted race for horses aged three and older. A sprint race, it is competed over a distance of 6 furlongs on Polytrack synthetic dirt and currently carries a purse of $125,000.

Inaugurated in 1982, the race was named in honour of the Windfields Farm Canadian Horse Racing Hall of Fame colt New Providence who in 1959 became the first official winner of the Canadian Triple Crown.

== Records ==
Speed record:

- 1:08.77 - Paso Doble (2015)

Most wins:

- 3 - Paso Doble (2011, 2013, 2015)

Most wins by an owner:

- 3 - Kinghaven Farms (1984, 1986, 1987)

Most wins by a jockey:

- 6 -Eurico Rosa Da Silva (2008, 2009, 2013, 2015, 2017, 2018)

Most wins by a trainer:

- 5 - Robert P. Tiller (1997, 2003, 2007, 2017, 2018)

== Winners of the New Providence Stakes ==
Year	Winner	Age	Jockey	Trainer	Owner	Time
2018	Pink Lloyd	6	Eurico Rosa Da Silva	Robert P. Tiller	Entourage Stable	1:09.60
2017	Pink Lloyd	5	Eurico Rosa Da Silva	Robert P. Tiller	Entourage Stable	1:08.59
2016	R U Watchingbud	4	Emma-Jayne Wilson	John A. Ross	J.R. Racing Stable Inc.	1:10.35
2015	Paso Doble	9	Eurico Rosa Da Silva	Mark Fournier	Centennial Farms/Craig Racing	1:08.77
2014	Phil's Dream	6	Justin Stein	Paul M. Buttigieg	Paul M. Buttigieg	1:09.25
2013	Paso Doble	7	Eurico Rosa Da Silva	Mark Fournier	Centennial Farms	1:09.81
2012	Gypsy Ring	6	Justin Stein	Paul M. Buttigieg	Paul M. Buttigieg	1:10.72
2011	Paso Doble	5	Patrick Husbands	Mark Casse	Centennial Farms (Niagara) Inc.	1:09.18
2010	Dancing Alltheway	5	Chantal Sutherland	Lorne Richards	KK Sangara	1:09.10
2009	Stuck in Traffic	4	Eurico Rosa da Silva	Nick Gonzalez	M.A.D. Racing Stables & Martha Gonzalez	1:09.57
2008	Main Executive	6	Eurico Rosa Da Silva	Radlie Loney	Bruno Brothers Farms	1:09.22
2007	Dave The Knave	5	David Clark	Robert P. Tiller	Frank Di Giulio, Jr./Tiller	1:11.10
2006	Main Executive	4	Richard Dos Ramos	Radlie A. Loney	Bruno Brothers Farms	1:09.20
2005	Mister Coop	6	Robert Landry	Daniel J. Vella	R.M.C Stable	1:10.56
2004	Barbeau Ruckus	5	Emile Ramsammy	Ross Armata	J. Armata/T. Thayalan	1:10.19
2003	Forever Grand	4	Todd Kabel	Robert P. Tiller	Frank Di Giulio, Jr./Tiller	1:10.96
2002	Sambuca On Ice	5	Patrick Husbands	Rita A. Schnitzler	Frank Romano	1:10.76
2001	Krz Ruckus	4	Dino Luciani	Michael DePaulo	Ron Guidolin et al.	1:12.01
2000	Matter Of Courage	4	Slade Callaghan	Ross Armata	C.E.C. Farms	1:11.12
1999	Deputy Inxs	8	Na Somsanith	Audre Cappuccitti	A & G Cappuccitti	1:09.44
1998	Sharkio	5	David Clark	Michael Wright, Jr.	Bruno Schickedanz	1:10.00
1997	Dan's My Pal	4	Emile Ramsammy	Robert P. Tiller	Frank DiGiulio, Jr. & Sr.	1:10.20
1996	Glanmire	6	Dave Penna	Michael Keogh	Kenny/O'Leary et al.	1:09.00
1995	Carey The Belle	7	Larry Attard	T. Danks	J. Schmid	1:10.80
1994	Glanmire	4	Jim McAleney	Michael Keogh	Kenny/O'Leary et al.	1:09.60
1993	Carey The Belle	5	Larry Attard	T. Danks	J. Schmid	1:10.00
1992	Canadian Silver	4	Dave Penna	Michael J. Doyle	Pinejoy Stable	1:10.40
1991	Twist The Snow	5	Larry Attard	Angus McArthur	Angus McArthur	1:10.00
1990	Twist The Snow	4	Larry Attard	Angus McArthur	Angus McArthur	1:10.20
1989	Mr. Hot Shot	4	Jim McAleney	William Stewart	J. Stewart/M. Upton	1:10.60
1988	Canadian Fighter	4	Jim McAleney	Bill Marko	Village Squire et al.	1:11.80
1987	Body Check	4	Don Seymour	Roger Attfield	Kinghaven Farms	1:09.80
1986	Body Check	3	Robin Platts	Roger Attfield	Kinghaven Farms	1:12.20
1985	Centenarian	4	Dave Penna	Frank H. Merrill, Jr.	C. Pickering Estate	1:10.60
1984	Introspective	3	Jack Lauzon	John J. Tammaro, Jr.	Kinghaven Farms	1:10.80
1983	Sintrillium	5	Brian Swatuk	Conrad Cohen	Frank Stronach	1:11.20
1982	Fraud Squad	3	Dan Beckon	Bill Marko	Seedhouse/McPhillips	1:11.20
