= Kennedy Road Stakes =

- Class: Grade II
- Location: Woodbine Racetrack; Toronto, Ontario Canada
- Inaugurated: 1989
- Race type: Thoroughbred - Flat racing
- Website: www.woodbineentertainment.com/qct/default.asp

Race information
- Distance: 6 furlong sprint
- Surface: Tapeta synthetic dirt
- Track: left-handed
- Qualification: Three-years-old & up
- Weight: Assigned
- Purse: $175,000 (plus up to $35,000 for eligible Ontario breds)

The Kennedy Road Stakes is a thoroughbred horse race run annually at Woodbine Racetrack in Toronto, Ontario, Canada. Run during the latter part of November, the Grade II sprint race is open to horses aged three and older. Raced over a distance of 6 furlongs, it currently offers a purse of C$200,000. The race was originally run on a natural dirt surface, but since 2006 has been on a synthetic "all weather" surface (Polytrack from 2005 to 2015, Tapeta starting in 2016).

Inaugurated in 1989 as the Kennedy Road Handicap, it was named in honour of Kennedy Road, the 1973 Canadian Horse of the Year and a Canadian Horse Racing Hall of Fame inductee.

== Records ==
Speed record:

- 1:08.05 - Chris's Bad Boy (2003) (on natural dirt)

Most wins:

- 2 - Pink Lloyd (2017, 2019, 2021)

Most wins by an owner:

- 4 - Frank Stronach (1994, 1995, 1996, 1997)

Most wins by a jockey:

- 6 - Todd Kabel (1994, 1995, 1996, 1997, 2001, 2006)

Most wins by a trainer:

- 6 - Robert P. Tiller (1994, 2002, 2005, 2017, 2019, 2021)

== Winners ==
Year	Winner	Age	Jockey	Trainer	Owner	Dist. (Furlongs)	Time	Win $	Gr.
2026	War Strategy	7	Sahin Civaci	Michael Wright Jr.	TEC Racing (Elliott S. Logan)	6 f	1:09.77	$120,000	G2
2025	Nobals	6	Rafael Manuel Hernandez	Larry Rivelli	Patricia's Hope LLC	6 f	1:09.85	$175,000	G2
2024	Nobals	5	E. T. Baird	Larry Rivelli	Patricia's Hope LLC	6 f	1:08.59	$175,000	G2
2023	Flag Of Honour (AUS)	4	Kazushi Kimura	Julia Carey	R.M. Wanless and Mrs. J. M. Wanless	6 f	1:08.86	$175,000	G2
2022	Candy Overload	4	Sahin Civaci	Mark E. Casse	Leonard Schleifer, Wachtel Stable & Gary Barber	6 f	1:09.17	$175,000	G2
2021	Pink Lloyd	9	Rafael Hernandez	Robert Tiller	Entourage Stable	6 f	1:08.84	$120,000	G2
2020	Ride A Comet	5	Patrick Husbands	Mark E. Casse	John C. Oxley & My Meadowview Farm LLC	6 f	1:08.25	$105,000	G2
2019	Pink Lloyd	7	Eurico Rosa da Silva	Robert Tiller	Entourage Stable	6 f	1:08.72	$126,000	G2
2018	Ikerrin Road	4	Ademar Santos	Vito Armata	Alpine Stable Limited	6 f	1:08.42	$105,000	G2
2017	Pink Lloyd	5	Eurico Rosa da Silva	Robert Tiller	Entourage Stable	6 f	1:08.46	$126,000	G2
2016	Stacked Deck	5	Rafael Hernandez	Barbara J. Minshall	Bruce Lunsford	6 f	1:08.19	$120,000	G2
2015	Stacked Deck	4	Luis Contreras	Barbara J. Minshall	Bruce Lunsford	6 f	1:08.34	$120,000	G2
2014	Calgary Cat	4	Eurico Rosa Da Silva	Kevin Attard	Stephen Chesney & Cory Hoffman	6 f	1:08.46	$120,000	G2
2013	Bear No Joke	5	Emma-Jayne Wilson	Reade Baker	Bear Stables	6 f	1:08.63	$108,000	G2
2012	Bear Tough Tiger	4	Justin Stein	Reade Baker	Bear Stables	6 f	1:08.77	$90,000	G3
2011	Essence Hit Man	4	Jesse Campbell	Audre Cappuccitti	Audre Cappuccitti & Gordon Cappuccitti	6 f	1:08.75	$108,000	G3
2010	Ravalo	6	Jeffrey Sanchez	Donald Barr	Lindy M. Redding	6 f	1:09.00	$90,000	G3
2009	Smokey Fire	4	Emma-Jayne Wilson	Sid C. Attard	Jim Dandy Stable	6 f	1:08.49	$103,500	G3
2008	Shadowless	3	Justin Stein	David R. Bell	Heather M. Takahashi	6 f	1:09.08	$99,000	G3
2007	Connections	6	Jeremy Rose	Michael Dini	Ruman Stable	6 f	1:08.78	$75,000	G3
2006	Main Executive	4	Todd Kabel	Radlie Loney	Bruno Brothers Farm	6 f	1:10.02	$75,000	
2005	Are You Serious	3	Corey Fraser	Robert Tiller	Robert Tiller & Frank DiGiulio Jr.	6 f	1:09.40	$84,075	
2004	Race not held due to weather conditions								
2003	Chris's Bad Boy	6	Jono Jones	Vito Armata	Alpine Stable Limited (John Armata)	6 f	1:08.05	$82,425	
2002	Cheap Talk	3	Patrick Husbands	Robert Tiller	Robert Tiller & Tom Lottridge	6 f	1:09.50	$82,500	
2001	Olympian	4	Todd Kabel	John Cardella	Rexdale Stable & Partner	6 f	1:09.77	$65,700	
2000	Wake At Noon	3	David Clark	Abraham R. Katryan	Bruno Schickedanz	6 f	1:10.89	$64,500	
1999	Great Defender	3	Slade Callaghan	Ross Armata	Robert & Shirley Wilson	6 f	1:08.17	$51,435	
1998	Uncle Woger	3	Patrick Husbands	Abraham R. Katryan	Brandon Brako Stable	6 f	1:09.20	$38,628	
1997	All Firmed Up	5	Todd Kabel	Daniel J. Vella	Frank Stronach	6 f	1:10.80	$38,988	
1996	Goldminers Gold	3	Todd Kabel	Daniel J. Vella	Frank Stronach	6 f	1:09.60	$50,130	
1995	Blitzer	6	Todd Kabel	Daniel J. Vella	Frank Stronach	6 f	1:09.80	$47,460	
1994	Blitzer	5	Todd Kabel	Robert P. Tiller	Frank Stronach	6 f	1:09.80	$37,890	
1993	British Banker	5	Dave Penna	Michael J. Doyle	Dogwood Stable	6 f	1:10.20	$37,386	
1992	Canadian Silver	4	Dave Penna	Michael J. Doyle	Pinejoy Stable	6 f	1:09.80	$37,323	
1991	King Corrie	3	Richard Dos Ramos	John A. Ross	Aubrey W. Minshall	6 f	1:09.20	$35,935	
1990	Twist the Snow	4	Larry Attard	Angus McArthur	Angus McArthur	6 f	1:10.00	$19,188	
1989	Mr. Hot Shot	4	James McAleney	William J. Stewart	Jimmy Stewart & Michelle Upton	6 f	1:10.40	$35,160	

== See also ==
- List of Canadian flat horse races
