= Lou Cavalaris Jr. =

Canadian horse trainer

Personal information
- Born: Hamilton, Ohio, United States
- Died: Etobicoke, Ontario, Canada
- Resting place: Park Lawn Cemetery, Toronto, Ontario
- Occupation: Racehorse trainer

Horse racing career
- Sport: Horse racing
- Career wins: 2004

Major racing wins
- Summer Stakes (1958, 1966) Highlander Stakes (1959, 1964, 1969, 1977); King Edward Stakes (1959, 1965, 1966, 1967, 1968, 1976, 1978); Seaway Stakes (1959, 1967, 1968); Dominion Day Stakes (1964, 1966, 1975); Victoria Stakes (1964, 1966); Valedictory Stakes (1964, 1970, 1974, 1976, 1994); Vigil Stakes (1964, 1966, 1969, 1970, 1973, 1974); Achievement Stakes (1965, 1966, 1971); Autumn Stakes (1965, 1966, 1967, 1968, 1972); Marine Stakes (1965, 1967, 1970, 1972); Queenston Stakes (1965, 1972); Seagram Cup Stakes (1965, 1970); Swynford Stakes (1965, 1966); Toronto Cup Stakes (1965, 1966); Connaught Cup Stakes (1966, 1968, 1969, 1971); Coronation Futurity Stakes (1966, 1967); Cup and Saucer Stakes (1966, 1967); Durham Cup Stakes (1966); Niagara Handicap (1966, 1967, 1968, 1970, 1974, 1976); Jockey Club Cup Handicap (1966, 1974, 1975, 1990); Wonder Where Stakes (1966, 1970); Jacques Cartier Stakes (1967, 1968, 1974, 1975); Nassau Stakes (1967, 1969); Vandal Stakes (1967); Whimsical Stakes (1967); E. P. Taylor Stakes (1968, 1969, 1970); Wood Memorial Stakes (1968); Nearctic Stakes (1973, 1974); La Prevoyante Stakes (1990) Canadian Triple Crown race wins: Breeders' Stakes (1970, 1974)

Racing awards
- Canadian Champion trainer by wins: (1966, 1969, 1970, 1972, 1973); U.S. Champion Thoroughbred Trainer by wins (1966); Sovereign Award for Outstanding Trainer (1976)

Honours
- Canadian Horse Racing Hall of Fame (1995); Etobicoke Sports Hall of Fame (2006)

Significant horses
- Cool Reception, Dancer's Image, Ice Water

Louis C. "Lou" Cavalaris Jr. (January 30, 1924 - May 2, 2013) was an American-born trainer of Thoroughbred racehorses who was inducted into the Canadian Horse Racing Hall of Fame and who for ten years was a highly respected racing secretary for the Ontario Jockey Club.

== Background ==
Born in Hamilton, Ohio, Cavalaris served in the US Merchant Marine in World War II. Thereafter he became a short-order cook. Following that he worked in Detroit on the backstretch. In 1960 he became a Canadian citizen. He was married to Helen and they had two sons together, Michael and Louis. At the time of his passing he was living in Etobicoke and had a granddaughter Julia.

== Career highlights ==
In 1946, Cavalaris took out his trainer's license, working with his father, who had a couple of horses in Detroit. In the mid-1960s, he ran Canada's most powerful public stable. He led Canadian trainers in wins in 1966 (although that was a tie), 1969, 1970, 1972, 1973 (also a tie), and 1976. In 1966, Cavalaris led North American trainers with 175 winners.

Some of Cavalaris' most noteworthy clients were Allen Case, Peter D. Fuller, George R. Gardiner, Margaret Seitz, and Joan Reid. Among the most famous horses he trained were Cool Reception, Henry Tudor, Ice Water, and Victorian Era. He was also the trainer of Dancer's Image, who won the 1968 Kentucky Derby on the track but was disqualified two days later due to testing positive for traces of the pain-killer phenylbutazone, a substance later made legal by the Kentucky Racing Commission.

In 1969, Cavalaris became Gardiner's exclusive trainer. In 1976, he directed Gardiner to record earnings of $639,816 (over $100,000 more than the previous record in Canada that Cavalaris also set). This was one of eight money-winning titles in the space of 11 years. Other famous winners he trained were Arctic Blizzard, Carney's Point, Chatty Cavalier, Double Quill, Haymaker's Jig, James Bay, Mary of Scotland, Monte Christo II, Orbiter, Plegada, Prompt Hero, The Knack II, Two Violins, Vindent de Paul, and Yukon Eric. His last winner, in June 1996, was Major Pots, owned by Gardiner.

== Other related activities ==
Cavalaris had a place on the Breeders' Cup Selection Committee, the Ontario Racing Commission's Board of Appeals, and the Avelino Gomez Memorial Award committee.

== Retirement ==
Cavalaris turned in his trainer's license in 1978. At that point he became the Ontario Jockey Club's racing secretary for a decade. Following that he went back to training. And in 1996 he retired once more.

== Awards and recognition ==
In 1976, Cavalaris won the Sovereign Award as outstanding trainer. In 2006, he was inducted into the Etobicoke Sports Hall of Fame and in 1995 the Canadian Horse Racing Hall of Fame. In 1996, he was hailed as North America's leading trainer.
