= Ontario Derby =

Flat horse race in Canada

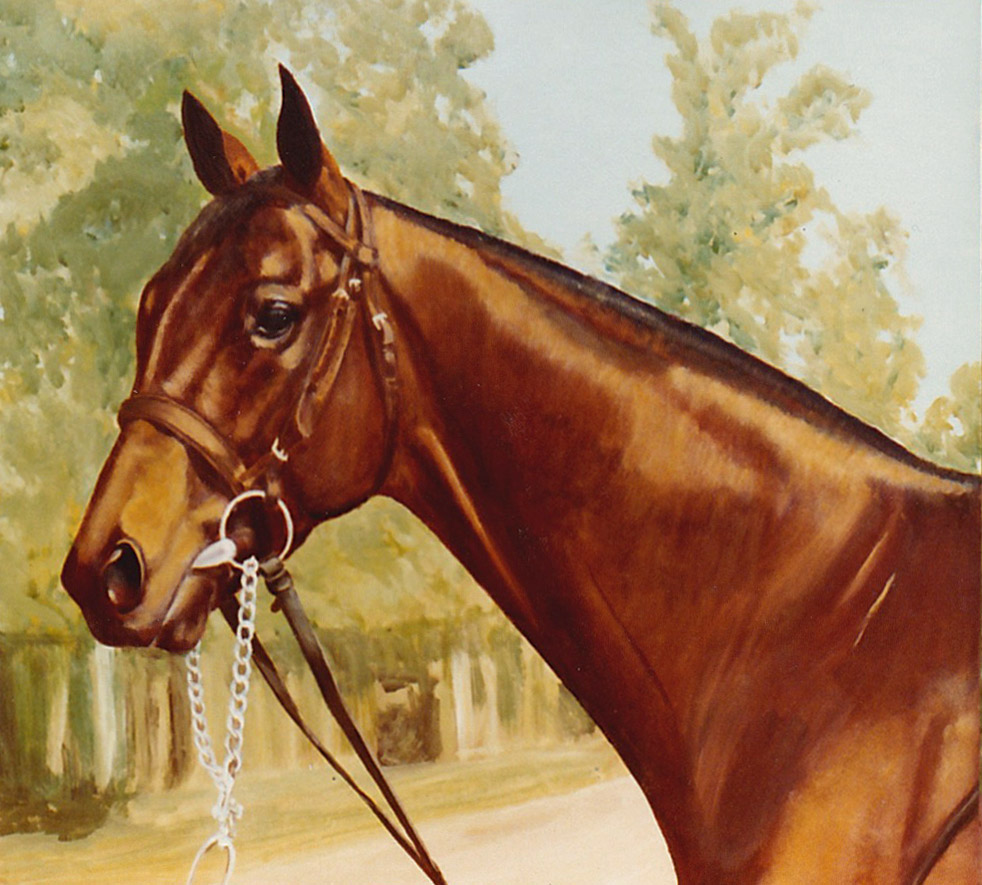
- Norcliffe, painted by Bob Demuyser (1920–2003)
- Class: Grade III
- Location: Woodbine Racetrack; Toronto, Ontario
- Inaugurated: 1972
- Race type: Thoroughbred – Flat racing
- Website: www.woodbineentertainment.com/qct/default.asp

Race information
- Distance: 1 1/8 miles (9 furlongs)
- Surface: Tapeta synthetic dirt
- Track: Left-handed
- Qualification: Three-year-olds
- Weight: Allowances
- Purse: Can$150,000 (2015)

The Ontario Derby is a Canadian Thoroughbred horse race run annually in mid-October at Woodbine Racetrack in Toronto, Ontario. A Grade III stakes since 2012, it is open to three-year-old horses. Raced over a distance of 1 1/8 miles (9 furlongs) on Tapeta, the Ontario Derby currently offers a purse of Can$150,000.

Inaugurated in 1972 as the Colonel R. S. McLaughlin Handicap, the race was renamed the Ontario Derby for the 2003 running. Originally contested at 1 3/16 miles, it was changed to its current 1 1/8-mile distance in 1992.

== Records ==
Speed record: (Through 1998, times were recorded in fifths of a second. Since 1999 they are in hundredths of a second)

- 1:48.30 – Ami's Gizmo (2016) (at current distance of 1 1/8 miles on Tapeta) – new track record
- 1:49.38 – Sand Cove (2008) (at current distance of 1 1/8 miles on Polytrack)
- 1:49.45 – Kiss A Native (2000) (at current distance of 1 1/8 miles on natural dirt)

Most wins by an owner:

- 3 – Sam-Son Farm (1974, 1987, 2013)
- 3 - Chiefswood Stables Limited (2017, 2023, 2025)

Most wins by a jockey:

- 5 – Sandy Hawley (1972, 1975, 1977, 1989, 1991)

Most wins by a trainer:

- 4 – Roger Attfield (1976, 1986, 2005, 2008)
- 4 – Mark E. Casse (2012 ,2014 ,2018, 2021)

== Winners of the Ontario Derby ==
Year	Winner	Jockey	Trainer	Owner	Time
2026	Fire and Wine	Jalon L. Samuel	Zeljko Krcmar	Paul Ryder	1:50.80
2025	Borealis Trail	Jose Luis Campos	Rachel Halden	Chiefswood Stables Limited	1:50.88
2024	Dresden Row	Ryan Munger	Lorne Richards	True North Stable and Bloom Racing Stable (Jeffery Stable)	1:49.12
2023	Touch'n Ride^{2}	Kazushi Kimura	Layne S. Giliforte	Chiefswood Stables Limited	1:48.93
2022	Ironstone	Kazushi Kimura	W. V. Armata	Jupiter Leasing Co. & Tequesta Racing Inc.	1:49.15
2021	Frosted Over	Kazushi Kimura	Mark E. Casse	Gary Barber	1:50.50
2020	Field Pass	Kazushi Kimura	Michael J. Maker	Three Diamonds Farm	1:48.35
2019	Global Access	Patrick Husbands	Michael J. Trombetta	Live Oak Plantation	1:48.24
2018	Lookin To Strike	Gary Boulanger	Mark E. Casse	Gary Barber	1:49.30
2017	Tiz a Slam	Eurico Rosa Da Silva	Roger L. Attfield	Chiefswood Stables Limited	1:51.57
2016	Ami's Gizmo	Luis Contreras	Josie Carroll	Ivan Dalos	1:48.30
2015	Lucky Lindy	Robby Albarado	Mark R. Frostad	Augustin Stable	1:50.64
2014	Florida Won	Patrick Husbands	Mark E. Casse	Live Oak Plantation	1:50.80
2013	His Race to Win	Eurico Rosa Da Silva	Malcolm Pierce	Sam-Son Farm	1:50.71
2012	Stealcase	Patrick Husbands	Mark E. Casse	John C. Oxley	1:50.56
2011	Derby Kitten	Mike E. Smith	Mike Maker	Kenneth and Sarah Ramsey	1:50.32
2010	Stately Victor	Victor Lebron	Mike Maker	Thomas F. Conway	1:50.51
2009	Crown Isle	Emile Ramsammy	John Charalambous	Uphill Stable	1:50.79
2008	Sand Cove	Richard Dos Ramos	Roger Attfield	Ralph Johnson	1:49.38
2007	Artie Hot	Eurico Rosa Da Silva	Martha Gonzalez	Carlo & Lou Tucci	1:51.19
2006	Shillelagh Slew	Dino Luciani	Mike DePaulo	David James	1:51.65
2005	Palladio	Richard Dos Ramos	Roger Attfield	Haras Santa Maria de Araras	1:50.67
2004	A Bit O'Gold	Jono Jones	Catherine Day Phillips	The Two Bit Racing Stable	1:53.18
2003	Mobil	Todd Kabel	Michael Keogh	Gus Schickedanz	1:51.99
2002	Early Wisdom	Jake Barton	Barb Pirie	Ken & Mike Ham	1:52.19
2001	Win City	Constant Montpellier	Robert P.Tiller	Frank DiGiulio, Jr.	1:51.54
2000	Kiss A Native	Mickey Walls	David R. Bell	John A. Franks	1:49.45
1999	Wonneberg	Emile Ramsammy	Michael Keogh	Gus Schickedanz	1:50.71
1998	Ski Maker	Jim McAleney	Arthur Silvera	J. Karalakis/T. Almbanis	1:50.60
1997	John The Magician	Steve Bahen	John A. Ross	R.M.C. Stable	1:52.00
1996	Stephanotis^{1}	Mickey Walls	Barbara J. Minshall	Minshall Farms	1:51.60
1995	Kiridashi	Larry Attard	Barbara J. Minshall	Minshall Farms	1:50.40
1994	Nice To Know	Robert Landry	Daniel J. Vella	Frank Stronach	1:51.40
1993	Bronze Basque	Mickey Walls	Vito Armata	Audre Cappuccitti	1:50.60
1992	Vying Victor	Robin Platts	Ian Jory	M/M Marvin Malmuth	1:51.20
1991	Majesterian	Sandy Hawley	Willard C. Freeman	John W. Meriwether	1:58.80
1990	Sezwhat	Brian Swatuk	Sam DiPasquale	Steve Wong	1:58.80
1989	Domasca Dan	Sandy Hawley	Robert P. Tiller	Frank DiGiulio Sr. & Jr.	1:57.60
1988	Derf	Jack Lauzon	Michael Tammaro	Clocker / Sunlight	1:58.60
1987	Duckpower	Larry Attard	James E. Day	Sam-Son Farm	1:59.40
1986	Lover's Cross	Robin Platts	Roger Attfield	Kinghaven Farms	1:57.60
1985	Old Gun Powder	Lloyd Duffy	Jerry G. Lavigne	Paddockhurst Stable	2:00.80
1984	Ten Gold Pots	Dan Beckon	Gil Rowntree	B. K. Y. Stable	1:58.20
1983	Canadian Factor	Gary Stahlbaum	Phil England	Frank Stronach	1:58.60
1982	Abruzzi Dancer	Richard Grubb	Jacques Dumas	F. & P. D'Andrea	1:57.20
1981	Frost King	Lloyd Duffy	Bill Marko	Ted Smith/Bill Marko	2:00.00
1980	Driving Home	Rick Hedge	Gil Rowntree	CFCW Racing Stable	1:56.20
1979	Port Master	Joey Belowus	Gil Rowntree	Stafford Farms	2:00.60
1978	Knight's Turn	John Bell	Emile M. Allain	Terfloth Farm	1:57.40
1977	Pro Consul	Sandy Hawley	Brian Ottaway	George McCullough	2:03.00
1976	Norcliffe	Jeffrey Fell	Roger Attfield	Norcliffe Stable	1:58.80
1975	L'Enjoleur	Sandy Hawley	Yonnie Starr	Jean-Louis Levesque	1:57.20
1974	Runnin Roman	Chris Rogers	Arthur H. Warner	Sam-Son Farm	1:55.80
1973	Come In Dad	W. Green	Conrad Cohen	Harvey Tenenbaum	1:56.60
1972	Nice Dancer	Sandy Hawley	Jerry G. Lavigne	Tom Morton / Harlequin	1:56.40

Notes:

^{1}In 1996, Steady Climb finished first but was disqualified and placed second.
^{2}In 2023, Solo Album finished first but was disqualified and placed fifth for interference in the first turn.

== See also ==
- List of Canadian flat horse races
