= Pink Lloyd =

Canadian-bred Thoroughbred racehorse

- Sire: Old Forester
- Grandsire: Forestry
- Dam: Gladiator Queen
- Damsire: Great Gladiator
- Sex: Gelding
- Foaled: February 23, 2012
- Country: Canada
- Colour: Chestnut
- Breeder: John Carey
- Owner: Entourage Stable
- Trainer: Robert Tiller
- Record: 38: 29-3-2 (Note: The record shown here is from Equibase, which treats the 2019 Bold Venture Stakes, where Pink Lloyd was declared a non-starter, as a start with a fourth place finish. The Daily Racing Form does not consider that race in Pink Lloyd's race record, thus considering him unbeaten in six starts in 2019.)
- Earnings: US$1,884,584

Major wins
- Jacques Cartier Stakes (2017, 2018, 2019, 2020); New Providence Stakes (2017, 2018); Achievement Stakes (2017, 2018); Vigil Stakes (2017, 2018, 2019, 2020); Shepperton Stakes (2017, 2019, 2020); Kenora Stakes (2017, 2018, 2019); Overskate Stakes (2017); Kennedy Road Stakes (2017, 2019, 2021); Bold Venture Stakes (2020, 2021)

Awards
- Canadian Horse of the Year (2017); Sovereign Award for Champion Male Sprinter (2017, 2018, 2019, 2020, 2021); Sovereign Award for Champion Older Male Horse (2017, 2019)
- Last updated on April 13, 2022

Pink Lloyd (foaled February 23, 2012) is a retired Canadian Thoroughbred racehorse who won eight Sovereign Awards during his career, including the award for Canadian Horse of the Year in 2017. He was undefeated in eight starts that year, with his largest win coming in the Kennedy Road Stakes. In 2018, he extended his winning streak to eleven with victories in the Jacques Cartier, New Providence and Achievement Stakes before the streak was broken on July 8 in the Shepperton Stakes. Three weeks later, he returned to the winner's circle in the Vigil Stakes followed by another win in the Kenora Stakes. Despite losing his last two starts of the year, he was named the Canadian Champion Sprinter of 2018.

In 2019, Pink Lloyd won six of seven starts, including his third victories in the Jacques Cartier, Vigil and Kenora Stakes, and second victory in the Kennedy Road. His only loss came in the Bold Venture Stakes when he was declared a non-starter after breaking through the starting gate. He was named Canadian Champion Sprinter for the third time and Champion Older Male Horse for the second time. During his 2020 campaign, he won the Jacques Cartier for the fourth time, the Shepperton Stakes for the third time, the Bold Venture for the first time and the Vigil for the fourth time. He was subsequently named Champion Sprinter for the fourth time. At age nine in 2021, he lost his first two starts but then won the next three, including his third victory in the Kennedy Road Stakes, for a career total of 26 stakes race wins. He was again named the Champion Sprinter, ending his career with eight Sovereign Awards.

== Background ==
Pink Lloyd is a chestnut gelding who was bred in Ontario by John Carey. He was sired by Old Forester and is out Gladiator Queen, a stakes-placed daughter of Great Gladiator. He was sold at the 2013 Canadian September yearling sales for US$28,446 to Entourage Stable, the nom de course for a group of five investors headed by Frank Di Giulio Jr. and friends Ed Longo, John Peri, John Lucato and Victor Mele. The horse's name is a reference to both the rock band Pink Floyd and to the character Lloyd from the television series Entourage.

Pink Lloyd was trained by Robert Tiller, a member of the Canadian Horse Racing Hall of Fame. When Pink Lloyd first started training, he would chase any horse who was working out at the same time, leaving him tired and sore. Tiller reacted by moving Pink Lloyd's training time to just before the track closes for training each morning. Pink Lloyd waited at the side of the track until all the other horses had left, then started his workout alone. Because Pink Lloyd had a tendency to kick, Tiller padded his stall with rubber to protect the horse from injury. His groom, Michelle Gibson, was given a special Sovereign Award as the outstanding groom of 2020.

== Racing career ==
Pink Lloyd did not race until his four-year-old season as he had trouble staying sound while reaching full maturity. He then raced exclusively at Woodbine Racetrack at sprint distances ranging up to seven furlongs. He made his first start on August 28, 2016, in a Maiden Special Weight race over six furlongs. Forced wide at the break, he used his early speed to get to the front and then withstood repeated challenges to win by a length and a half.

Pink Lloyd won his next two starts, both at the allowance level, before suffering his first defeat in the Overskate Stakes on October 29, finishing fifth. He finished his four-year-old campaign on November 25 in the Grade II Kennedy Road Stakes over six furlongs. He raced near the back of the pack during the early part of the race, then found racing room in the final furlong to close into second place, just one length behind the winner, Stacked Deck.

=== 2017: five-year-old season ===
Pink Lloyd began his five-year-old campaign in the listed six-furlong Jacques Cartier Stakes on April 15, 2017 – opening day at Woodbine. He was bumped at the start but soon settled in second behind a fast early pace set by Conquest Tsunami. Put to a drive turning into the stretch, he took over the lead in mid-stretch and then held off a late run from Commute to win by three-quarters of a length.

His next start was on May 6 in the New Providence Stakes, a six-furlong race restricted to horses sired by Ontario-based stallions. Going off as the odds-on favorite, Pink Lloyd raced in mid-pack for the first half mile, then circled wide for an easy win. He followed up with a wire-to-wire victory in the Achievement Stakes on June 10.

Pink Lloyd earned his first graded stakes win in the Vigil Stakes on July 16, run at a distance of seven furlongs. He took the early lead then withstood multiple challenges at the top of the stretch before drawing off to win by 2 1/4 lengths. "He's a gift from God, that's what I think," said Tiller. "At the barn, he's difficult. He's a big boy and he loves to make you worry."

Pink Lloyd followed up with wins in the Shepperton Stakes on August 12 and the Kenora Stakes on August 30 in restricted stakes company. During the latter race, he tore off the horseshoe on his right hind hoof, resulting in a cut and a quarter crack. He was given a few weeks to recover, then returned in the seven-furlong Overskate Stakes on October 29. He broke a half-stride behind the rest of the field, then settled about seven lengths behind the fast early pace set by Singandcryindubai. Turning into the stretch, he made an "eye-catching move" to take the lead and then drew away for a four-length victory.

Pink Lloyd's final start of the season came in the Kennedy Road Stakes on November 25. He pulled his way to the early lead, challenged on both sides down the backstretch and into the far turn. Drawing away from his early challengers at the top of the stretch, he turned back one last challenge and won by 2 1/4 lengths. "I thought I was going to be a little more behind the pace, but he brought me there," said jockey Eurico Rosa Da Silva. "He was really, really easy. But there's always horses around him, he's an aggressive horse."

Pink Lloyd completed the season with eight stakes race wins from eight starts – believed to be the longest stakes-winning streak ever at Woodbine Racetrack. At the Sovereign Awards, he was named Canadian Horse of the Year, Champion Sprinter and Champion Older Male Horse.

=== 2018: six-year-old season ===
Pink Lloyd was given some time off over the winter at a farm in Ontario, then resumed training in January 2018. He made his first start of the year in the Jacques Cartier Stakes on April 21. Tiller was somewhat concerned as the gelding had missed a workout due to weather problems and jockey Da Silva was serving a suspension. Under jockey Rafael Manuel Hernandez, Pink Lloyd settled behind the early leader Conquest Enforcer, who completed the first quarter mile in 21.96 seconds. Pink Lloyd then made a powerful move rounding the far turn to take control, drawing away to win by three-quarters of a length while setting a new track record of 1:08.05 for six furlongs. "I've ridden against him, and every time he's beat me," said Hernandez. "He beat me eight times. I finally get on him, and I won the race."

Pink Lloyd extended his winning streak to ten with his second victory in the New Providence Stakes on May 13. Reunited with Da Silva, he broke quickly but was soon passed by Marten River, who completed the first quarter mile in 22.70 seconds. Pink Lloyd then moved back to the lead, withstood a challenge from Lokinforpursemonee around the far turn, and drew off to win by 6 1/4 lengths. "I was fighting with him to sit second," said Da Silva, "and another horse started lugging out and I just went beside him and he took off from there. He said, 'You know what, let me do my job,' and he started running. He's a very special horse."

On June 3, Pink Lloyd went off as the 1-10 favorite in the Achievement Stakes against only three rivals. He broke poorly but then rushed up to challenge Lokinforpursemonee for the lead. The two set brisk fractions as they dueled around the turn, then Pink Lloyd pulled away down the stretch to win by three lengths. The win took his career earnings over Can$1 million. It was his eleventh straight win.

Pink Lloyd's winning streak finally came to an end in the Shepperton Stakes on July 8. He tossed his head in the starting gate and broke poorly, slamming sideways into Jack's Escarpment. He then rushed forward to enter into a speed duel with Boreal Spirit, completing the first quarter-mile in 22.43 seconds and the first half in 44.86. He started to pull clear in the stretch, but could not hold off the closing drive of Kingsport and Jack's Escarpment, finishing third. "Bad luck that my horse broke too sharp," said Da Silva. "When I tried to take him back, he was fighting me, and I let him run. I made that decision and I had to live with it."

Pink Lloyd spiked a fever two days after the Shepperton but was soon back in training. On July 29, he went off as the 2-5 favorite in a field of six contesting the Vigil Stakes. He settled in the middle of the pack for the first half mile then moved to the outside as they rounded the final turn. In the stretch, Pink Lloyd accelerated and drew clear to win by two lengths over Yorktown, with Jack's Escarpment another 2 1/4 lengths back in third. He followed up on August 29 with a win in the Kenora Stakes when he overcame a poor start to catch Circle of Friends in the final strides.

On September 15, Pink Lloyd went off as the even-money favourite in the Bold Venture Stakes. Shortly after being loaded, he broke through the starting gate and struggled against Da Silva's attempts to pull him up, resulting in a fall for Da Silva. Pink Lloyd was captured by the outrider, then was remounted by Da Silva and loaded again. When the race finally began, Pink Lloyd settled in mid-pack and failed to respond when they turned for home, finishing fifth. "He was too sharp, I guess," said Tiller. "He got away with that (breaking through the gate) once last year, but that’s not a good thing."

Pink Lloyd made his final start of the year in the Overskate Stakes on October 27. He again broke poorly, then settled in fourth place. Around the final turn, he moved to the lead but then tired and finished fourth. After the race, it was reported that he bled, indicating trouble with his breathing. Tiller announced that the gelding would be given time to "heal up his little issues" before re-entering training.

Pink Lloyd finished the year with five wins from eight starts and was named the Canadian Champion Sprinter of 2018.

=== 2019: seven-year-old season ===
Pink Lloyd began his seven-year-old campaign on May 4, 2019, with his third win in the Jacques Cartier Stakes. Carrying top weight of 124 pounds (56 kg) in a field of twelve, Pink Lloyd broke well and rated behind a fast early pace. In the stretch, he steadily closed ground and pulled away in the final strides to win by a length.

Pink Lloyd was supposed to make his second start of the year on May 25 in the $125,000 Greenwood Stakes. However, a thunderstorm started just as the field was nearing the starting gate, causing the race to be postponed. The race was rescheduled on June 1, with Pink Lloyd going off as the 3-10 favorite in a field of seven. He rated in mid-pack, then started his move rounding the far turn. He opened a three-length lead in midstretch then held off the closing run of Marten Lake to win by 1 3/4 lengths.

On July 14, Pink Lloyd earned his third victory in the Vigil Stakes, overcoming a career high weight assignment of 127 pounds (conceding the rest of the field from 5 to 9 pounds). He rated behind the early pace then "inhaled" the early leaders in the stretch to win by 4 1/2 lengths. Tiller called him "the greatest sprinter there ever was in Canada."

Pink Lloyd extended his new winning streak to five with victories in the Shepperton Stakes on August 4 and the Kenora Stakes on August 29. The streak was broken though in the Bold Venture Stakes on September 14 after he broke through the starting gate and was deemed a non-starter.

Pink Lloyd made his final start of the year as the 3-5 favorite in the Kennedy Road Stakes on November 23. He trailed the field of eight down the backstretch then swung wide on the turn as he moved into position. He moved to the lead at the eighth pole and won by 1 1/4 lengths. Da Silva was emotional after the race as he was retiring at the end of the season and knew this would be his last race with Pink Lloyd. "There was so much trouble in front of me, and I just took him back and said 'Boy, we need to go outside'," he said. "There's only one horse who could do it. His name is Pink Lloyd."

Pink Lloyd was narrowly edged out by Starship Jubilee in the 2019 Sovereign Award voting for Canadian Horse of the Year, losing by 105 votes to 108. He was named Canadian Champion Sprinter for the third year in a row and Champion Older Male Horse for the second time.

=== 2020: eight-year-old season ===
Pink Lloyd's eight-year-old debut was delayed by the closure of Woodbine due to the COVID-19 pandemic. On June 25, 2020, he won the Jacques Cartier for a record fourth time, pulling clear down the stretch to win by two lengths. "He's an old horse and does everything by himself, said new jockey Rafael Manuel Hernandez. "He just needs somebody on him to make the race official."

On July 23, he earned his third victory in the Shepperton Stakes. He made his next start on August 15 in the Bold Venture Stakes, in which he had finished fifth in 2018 and was a non-starter in 2019. Carrying 128 pounds, he was positioned in third place then split between the early leaders to take the lead in mid-stretch. He won by a neck over a fast closing Olympic Runner. "Pink Lloyd He overcame a bad trip today for him," said Tiller. "He loves to run at horses, not be squeezed in between horses, and I think he kind of thought it was over."

"Honestly, he doesn't like the heat, and he was kind of flat today," Tiller added. "He really wasn't as sharp as he can get. When you go to put the weight on this horse in the paddock and that big lead weight pad gets on him, you realize what kind of a horse this is. He's an icon."

Pink Lloyd made his next start in the Vigil Stakes on September 5, going off as the even-money favorite in a field of nine while carrying 128 pounds. He stalked the early pace, then angled out on the turn to start his move. He took the lead in mid-stretch and won by a length over Olympic Runner. He finished the six furlongs in 1:08.06, just one hundredth of a second off the track record he had set in 2018. It was his fourth win in the Vigil.

Pink Lloyd was given some rest after the race, then made his final start of the year in the Kennedy Road Stakes on November 21. He rated off the early pace but lacked his normal closing kick and finished third to Ride a Comet. He finished the year with four wins from five starts and was once again named Canadian Champion Sprinter. He finished second to Mighty Heart in the voting for Canadian Horse of the Year.

=== 2021: nine-year-old season ===
Tiller announced that 2021 would be Pink Lloyd's final season. "You're dealing with a 9-year-old", he said. "He's been a wonderful animal, he's earned over $2 million [Canadian], and he loves racing. He's happy and he's sound right now – that's why he's running. We're going to take it one start at a time and make a decision after each start."

Pink Lloyd made his 2021 debut in the Jacques Cartier Stakes, which was held on June 20 because of the delayed re-opening of Woodbine due to the COVID-19 pandemic. Going off as the 6-5 favourite, he was pinched back in a tightly bunched field. He started his move on the turn and improved to second place, but was outrun by Souper Stonehenge who won by four lengths.

Pink Lloyd made his next start on August 1 in the Vigil Stakes. Souper Stonehenge went to the early lead, pressed by Green Light Go. Pink Lloyd raced at the back of the pack and started his rally on the turn. However, he had to check strides when a tiring Green Light Go blocked his path. Pink Lloyd angled to the outside and closed steadily down the stretch. Souper Stonehenge hung on to win by three-quarters of a length.

On September 25, Pink Lloyd entered the Bold Venture Stakes as the even-money favorite in a field of five. Since there were no other speed horses in the field, Pink Lloyd went to the early lead and set a moderate pace of :23.83 for the first quarter-mile. The pace picked up when he was challenged by Lucky Curlin as they completed the half-mile in :46.48. Lucky Curlin closed to within a head in midstretch but Pink Lloyd then pulled away to win by three-quarters of a length.

"I'm just so very happy today," said Tiller, "because I thought he should have won his last race. This is not his best race on the lead, that's not what he wants. He likes to run at horses. He's a very competitive horse, but we had no choice today."

Pink Lloyd made his next start on November 7 in the Ontario Jockey Club Stakes, going off as the 2-5 favourite in a field of six. He pressed Souper Hot through a moderate opening quarter of :23.37 and a half-mile in :46.02. They battled each other down the stretch with Pink Lloyd winning by a neck in a time of 1:09.52 for the six furlongs. "He was just playing with the other horse", said Hernandez. "He likes to fight all the time."

Pink Lloyd made his final start in the Kennedy Road Stakes on November 27. He faced a strong field that included Souper Stonehenge, who went off as the 2-1 favourite in a field of eight. Clayton went to the early lead with Richiesinthehouse a length behind. Pink Lloyd settled in fifth place in a tightly bunched field. After a half-mile in :44.72, Pink Lloyd was angled to the outside for racing room, while Richiesinthehouse made his move along the rail. Pink Lloyd closed steadily and drew away in the final strides to win by half a length over Richiesinthehouse with Clayton a further head behind in third. Pink Lloyd returned to the winners circle to a standing ovation. It was his 26th stakes victory.

"We're blessed to win this race and it's a tremendous way to go out:, said Tiller. "You know, he's been Woodbine's horse, he's been Canada's horse, and the next time some horse wins 26 stakes and 29 races at Woodbine, let me know about it."

Pink Lloyd was named the Canadian Champion Sprinter for the fifth year in a row at the 2021 Sovereign Award ceremonies.

== Retirement ==
After his retirement, Pink Lloyd was sent to the LongRun Thoroughbred Retirement Society in Hillsburgh, Ontario. Although LongRun specializes in matching retired Thoroughbreds with new owners for a second career, Pink Lloyd will be a permanent resident of the farm.

== Pedigree ==
Pedigree of Pink Lloyd, chestnut gelding, 2012
Sire Old Forester 2001	Forestry; 1996	Storm Cat	Storm Bird
Sire Old Forester 2001	Forestry; 1996	Storm Cat	Terlingua
Sire Old Forester 2001	Forestry; 1996	Shared Interest	Pleasant Colony
Sire Old Forester 2001	Forestry; 1996	Shared Interest	Surgery
Sire Old Forester 2001	Halo River; 1995	Irish River (FR)	Riverman
Sire Old Forester 2001	Halo River; 1995	Irish River (FR)	Irish Star
Sire Old Forester 2001	Halo River; 1995	All Hallows	Halo
Sire Old Forester 2001	Halo River; 1995	All Hallows	Leap Lively
Dam Gladiator Queen 2001	Great Gladiator; 1977	Timeless Moment	Damascus
Dam Gladiator Queen 2001	Great Gladiator; 1977	Timeless Moment	Hour of Parting
Dam Gladiator Queen 2001	Great Gladiator; 1977	Ansellia	Hawaii
Dam Gladiator Queen 2001	Great Gladiator; 1977	Ansellia	Lovely Folly
Dam Gladiator Queen 2001	Ascot Sarah; 1996	Ascot Knight	Danzig
Dam Gladiator Queen 2001	Ascot Sarah; 1996	Ascot Knight	Bambee T. T.
Dam Gladiator Queen 2001	Ascot Sarah; 1996	Sarawilha	Sir Ivor
Dam Gladiator Queen 2001	Ascot Sarah; 1996	Sarawilha	Nosey Nan (family: 5-h)

Pink Lloyd is inbred 5 x 5 to Northern Dancer, meaning that stallion appears twice in the fifth generation of his pedigree.

== See also ==
- List of leading Thoroughbred racehorses
- Repeat winners of horse races
