= Mickey Walls =

Personal information
- Born: June 1, 1974 (age 52) Vancouver, British Columbia, Canada
- Occupation: Jockey

Horse racing career
- Sport: Horse racing
- Career wins: 1,453

Major racing wins
- Grey Breeders' Cup Stakes (1991, 2001); Glorious Song Stakes (1991); Highlander Stakes (1991, 1999); Plate Trial Stakes (1991); Princess Elizabeth Stakes (1991, 1993, 1997); Seaway Stakes (1991, 1999); Swynford Stakes (1991); Vigil Stakes (1991, 1997); Jacques Cartier Stakes (1992, 1997, 1998); Lady Angela Stakes (1992, 1996, 1999, 2000); Miss Woodford Stakes (1992); La Prevoyante Stakes (1993, 1998); Col. R. S. McLaughlin Handicap (1993, 1996, 2000); San Pasqual Handicap (1993); Star Shoot Stakes (1994); Tampa Bay Derby (1994); Ben Ali Stakes (1995); Laurance Armour Handicap (1995); Autumn Stakes (1996, 1998, 1999); Chicago Breeders' Cup Handicap (1996); Coronation Futurity Stakes (1996); Dominion Day Stakes (1996, 1998); King Edward Stakes (1996, 1998); Martha Washington Stakes (1996); Summer Stakes (1996); Bison City Stakes (1997, 2002); Connaught Cup Stakes (1997); Display Stakes (1997); Eclipse Stakes (1997, 2000); Hendrie Stakes (1997); Nassau Stakes (1997); Overskate Stakes (1997); Shady Well Stakes (1997); Victoriana Stakes (1997); Whimsical Stakes (1997); Wonder Where Stakes (1997); Hong Kong Jockey Club Trophy Stakes (1999); Royal North Stakes (1999); Woodbine Oaks (1999); Bessarabian Stakes (2000); Durham Cup Stakes (2000); Play The King Stakes (2000); Natalma Stakes (2001); Alywow Stakes (2002) Canadian Classic Race wins: Breeders' Stakes (1996); Prince of Wales Stakes (1996); Queen's Plate (1999)

Racing awards
- Canadian Champion Apprentice Jockey (1990, 1991); United States Champion Apprentice Jockey (1991); Canadian Champion Jockey (1991); Leading jockey at Greenwood Raceway (1990, 1991); Leading jockey at Woodbine Racetrack (1991, 1993); Avelino Gomez Memorial Award (2013)

Honours
- British Columbia Thoroughbred Hall of Fame (2008); Canadian Horse Racing Hall of Fame (2019)

Significant horses
- Chief Bearhart, Kiridashi, Prospective Dolly, Stephanotis, Woodcarver

Mickey K. Walls (born June 1, 1974, in Vancouver, British Columbia) is a retired Thoroughbred horse racing jockey who was a Champion in both the United States and Canada.

== Early life ==
Mickey Walls grew up in Langley, British Columbia, the son of Thoroughbred racehorse trainer, Joe Walls.

== Riding career ==
He began riding professionally in 1990 at age sixteen, first competing at Exhibition Park in Vancouver. Immediately successful, in the fall he went east to Toronto to ride at Woodbine Racetrack and then at Greenwood Raceway where he was the leading jockey at the Autumn Meet. For his performances, Walls was voted the Sovereign Award as the 1990 Canadian Champion Apprentice Jockey.

Still an apprentice in Canada, in 1991 Mickey Walls had a spectacular year, setting a Canadian record for most races won by an apprentice jockey with 231, and winning more races and garnering more purse money at Woodbine Racetrack than any jockey in history. At the Greenwood Raceway Spring Meet he won a second riding title. His 1991 efforts saw him become the first apprentice jockey to be voted the Sovereign Award and the United States' Eclipse Award in the same year. In addition, he was voted the overall Canadian Champion Jockey.

As a result of a serious injury, 1992 proved to be a difficult year for Mickey Walls. Nevertheless, he was the leading jockey at the Greenwood Spring Meet before breaking a leg in a racing accident that kept him out of racing for the season. In 1993, he was again back in form and was the leading jockey at Woodbine Racetrack for a second time. In 1994 and 1995, Walls competed in the United States at various tracks including Arlington Park, Churchill Downs, Fair Grounds Race Course, Keeneland, and Santa Anita Park. He returned to race in Canada in 1996 where he won the final two legs of the Canadian Triple Crown series, capturing the Prince of Wales Stakes aboard Stephanotis then the Breeders' Stakes on Canada's top turf runner and future Hall of Fame inductee, Chief Bearhart. Among his other racing accomplishments, in 1999 Mickey Walls rode Woodcarver to victory in the Queen's Plate, Canada's most prestigious race and the first leg of the Triple Crown series.

== Retirement ==
After years of struggling against weight gain, in 2002 Walls retired but in 2003 attempted a short-lived comeback at Nad Al Sheba Racecourse in Dubai before retiring permanently.

== Honors ==
In 2008, Mickey Walls was inducted in the British Columbia Thoroughbred Hall of Fame and was a nominee for the Canadian Horse Racing Hall of Fame in 2009. In June 2013, he won the Avelino Gomez Memorial Award for significant contributions to the sport of thoroughbred horse racing. Walls was later named into the Canadian Horse Racing Hall of Fame in 2019.
