= Jack M. Lauzon =

Jack Lauzon
Personal information
- Born: December 5, 1961 (age 64) Welland, Ontario, Canada
- Occupation: Jockey

Horse racing career
- Sport: Horse racing
- Career wins: 1,619

Major racing wins
- Highlander Stakes (1984); New Providence Stakes (1984); Ontario Fashion Stakes (1984, 1985); Shady Well Stakes (1984); Shepperton Stakes (1984, 1989); Bessarabian Stakes (1985); Bold Venture Stakes (1985); Bunty Lawless Stakes (1986); Seagram Cup Handicap (1986); Swynford Stakes (1986); Beverly D. Stakes (1987); Kingarvie Stakes (1987, 1991, 1993); Achievement Stakes (1988); Cup and Saucer Stakes (1988); La Prevoyante Stakes (1988); Victoria Park Stakes (1988); Jockey Club Cup Handicap (1988); Col. R.S. McLaughlin Handicap (1988); Queenston Stakes (1988); Nearctic Stakes (1989); Mazarine Breeders' Cup Stakes (1991); Toronto Cup Stakes (1991); Woodbine Handicap (1992); Dominion Day Stakes (1992); Connaught Cup Stakes (1993); Coronation Futurity (1993); Colin Stakes (1994); Natalma Stakes (1994, 1999); Sam F. Davis Stakes (1994); Canadian Classic Race wins: Queen's Plate (1988, 1994); Breeders' Stakes (1994)

Racing awards
- Avelino Gomez Memorial Award (2008)

Significant horses
- Regal Intention, Basqueian, Be Prosperous

Jack M. Lauzon (born December 5, 1961) is a Canadian retired Hall Of Fame Thoroughbred horse racing jockey whom The Blood-Horse magazine called "one of the most respected riders in Canada."

Lauzon began his professional riding career in 1981 and met with considerable success at Fort Erie Racetrack, Greenwood Raceway and Woodbine Racetrack and won races in the United States. He is a two-time winner of Canada's most prestigious race, the Queen's Plate. He won his first Plate in 1988 aboard Regal Intention then the following year missed winning the race again when his horse was beaten by less than a nose. In 1994 he won his second Plate aboard Basqueian plus went on that year to win the third leg of the Canadian Triple Crown series, the Breeders' Stakes.

== Accident and recovery ==
In August 1996 Jack Lauzon was competing at the Macau Jockey Club near Hong Kong when he was involved in a racing accident that most believed would end his career. He was paralysed from the chest down after fracturing three vertebrae and was within a hair of severing his spinal cord. After more than two and half years of painful rehabilitation therapy, he returned to racing in April 1999. In 2005, writer/broadcaster Peter Gross won a Sovereign Award for Outstanding Newspaper Article with the story of Lauzon's accident and recovery titled "The Amazing Story of Jack Lauzon" which appeared in The Game newspaper.

Jack Lauzon retired in 2007 and became a jockey's agent. As an Agent for Omar Moreno guided Omar to become a Two-time Sovereign Award (Canada) and Eclipse Award (America) Leading Apprentice.

With His contribution to the sport of Thoroughbred racing was honoured with the 2008 Avelino Gomez Memorial Award.
