= Win City =

Canadian-bred Thoroughbred racehorse

- Sire: Slew City Slew
- Grandsire: Seattle Slew
- Dam: Winsfordan
- Damsire: Domasca Dan
- Sex: Gelding
- Foaled: 1998
- Country: Canada
- Colour: Dark Bay
- Breeder: Frank Digiulio & Frank DiGiulio, Jr.
- Owner: Frank Digiulio & Frank DiGiulio, Jr.
- Trainer: Robert Tiller
- Record: 18: 6-3-3
- Earnings: $994,558

Major wins
- Queenston Stakes (2001); Marine Stakes (2001); Plate Trial Stakes (2001); Col. R. S. McLaughlin Stakes (2001); Autumn Stakes (2001) Canadian Classic Race wins: Prince of Wales Stakes (2001)

Awards
- Canadian Champion 3-Yr-Old Male Horse (2001); Canadian Horse of the Year (2001)
- Last updated on July 6, 2008

Win City (foaled 1998 in Ontario) is a retired Canadian Champion Thoroughbred racehorse. The grandson of U.S. Triple Crown champion, Seattle Slew, he was bred for a $5,000 stud fee by the father and son team of Frank Digiulio, Sr. and Jr. who owned his mare, Winsfordan.

In 2001, Win City won six important stakes races. He ran second to Dancethruthedawn in the Queen's Plate then the two horses reversed their positions in the second leg of the Canadian Triple Crown, the Prince of Wales Stakes. His 2001 performances earned Win City the Sovereign Award for Champion 3-Year-Old Male Horse and Canadian Horse of the Year honours.

Sent to the track in 2002, four-year-old Win City was winless in seven starts.
