= Robert Tiller =

Canadian Thoroughbred racehorse trainer (born 1949)

Personal information
- Born: 11 December 1949 (age 76) Amsterdam, Netherlands
- Occupations: Trainer, Owner/ woodbine

Horse racing career
- Sport: Horse racing
- Career wins: 2000 (ongoing)

Major racing wins
- Achievement Stakes (1975, 2002, 2004, 2017, 2018); Ontario Damsel Stakes (1985, 2001, 2004, 2005); Bull Page Stakes (1988); Col. RS McLaughlin Stakes (1989, 2001); Jamaica Handicap (1989); Queenston Stakes (1989, 1998, 2001, 2004); Royal North Stakes (1990, 1997, 2013); Display Stakes (1991); George C. Hendrie Stakes (1992, 2004); Kennedy Road Stakes (1994, 2002, 2005, 2017); Sky Classic Stakes (1994); New Providence Stakes (1997, 2003, 2007, 2017, 2018); Bison City Stakes (1998); Seaway Stakes (1998, 2003, 2004); Princess Elizabeth Stakes (1999); Autumn Stakes (2001); La Lorgnette Stakes (2001, 2014); Marine Stakes (2001); Plate Trial Stakes (2001); Vandal Stakes (2001, 2003); Classy 'N Smart Stakes (2002, 2003, 2004, 2016); Bessarabian Stakes (2003, 2016); Shepperton Stakes (2003, 2006, 2008, 2017); Highlander Handicap (2003); Jacques Cartier Stakes (2003, 2017, 2018); Cup and Saucer Stakes (2004); Clarendon Stakes (2006, 2017); Deputy Minister Stakes (2007, 2010, 2013, 2014); Overskate Stakes (2007, 2015, 2017); South Ocean Stakes (2011); Vigil Stakes (2017, 2018) Canadian Classic race wins: Prince of Wales Stakes (2001)

Racing awards
- Sovereign Award for Outstanding Trainer (2001, 2003, 2004); Woodbine Racetrack Leading Trainer (1994, 1997, 2001, 2003)

Honours
- Canadian Horse Racing Hall of Fame (2008)

Significant horses
- Pink Lloyd, Domasca Dan, Win City, Simply Lovely, Brass in Pocket
- Updated on September 14, 2018

Robert P. Tiller (born December 11, 1949, in Amsterdam, The Netherlands) is a Canadian Thoroughbred racehorse trainer. A resident of Brampton, Ontario, he has long been one of the top trainers at Toronto's Woodbine Racetrack. He has won four training titles at Woodbine Racetrack, earned three Sovereign Awards for Outstanding Trainer and was inducted into the Canadian Horse Racing Hall of Fame in 2008.

Tiller began training in 1972 and won his first race with Royal Greek Ship. He had his first starter in the Queen's Plate in 1975, finishing second with longshot Near the High Sea. Some of his early stars include stakes winners Domasca Dan, Elated Guy and Talk Back.

Tiller has won four Woodbine training titles, capturing top honours in 1994 with 65 wins, 1997 (55 wins), 2001 (62 wins), and 2003 (72 wins). He was originally known as a trainer of claiming horses, but now trains mainly stakes and allowance horses. Tiller earned his first Sovereign Award for Outstanding Trainer in 2001. The year was highlighted by six stakes victories by trainee Win City, who was voted Canadian Horse of the Year. Win City finished second in the Queen's Plate but came back to win the Prince of Wales Stakes, earning Tiller his first victory in a Canadian Triple Crown race. That year, Tiller also trained Rare Friends, the Canadian Champion Two-Year-Old Colt.

In 2003, Tiller earned his second Sovereign Award after a career-best year with 71 wins including 15 stakes victories and earnings of over Can$4 million. Trainee Brass in Pocket was a Sovereign-Award finalist after winning five stakes races.

Tiller followed up with his third Sovereign Award in 2004, a year where he was Woodbine's leading sprint trainer with 47 wins in the division. Trainee Simply Lovely was named the Canadian Champion Two-Year-Old Filly.

In 2008, he was inducted in the Canadian Horse Racing Hall of Fame.

On June 19, 2020, at Woodbine Racetrack, Tiller won his 2000th race.

Tiller has been one of Woodbine's leading trainers, especially in the sprint division. He came back into the spotlight in 2017 when trainee Pink Lloyd earned eight straight stakes victories on his way to Canadian Horse of the Year and Champion Sprinter honours. He had to work around Pink Lloyd's early injury problems and adopted an unusual training schedule to keep the horse relaxed in the mornings.
