= Simon Husbands =

Personal information
- Born: July 16, 1969 (age 57) Bridgetown, Barbados
- Occupation: Jockey

Horse racing career
- Sport: Horse racing
- Career wins: 38

Major racing wins
- Barbados Gold Cup (1998); Frost King Stakes (2000); Bold Ruckus Stakes (2001); Shady Well Stakes (2003); Victoria Park Stakes (2004); Jacques Cartier Stakes (2008)

Significant horses
- Federico, Organ Grinder

Simon Husbands (born July 16, 1969, in Bridgetown, Barbados) is a jockey in Thoroughbred horse racing.

Husbands began racing in his native Barbados in the mid nineteen eighties then a few years later relocated to Fort Erie Racetrack in Fort Erie, Ontario, Canada where he earned his first North American win in 1990. Riding from a base at Woodbine Racetrack in Toronto since 2000, among his victories, Simon Husbands has won the Shady Well, Frost King and Victoria Park Stakes. In 1998 he traveled to his homeland where he won the country's most prestigious race, the Barbados Gold Cup.

Simon Husbands is the older brother of jockey Patrick Husbands who followed in his footsteps and settled in Canada.
