= Sid C. Attard =

Maltese-Canadian horse trainer

Sid Attard
Personal information
- Born: September 29, 1950 (age 75) Birkirkara, Malta
- Occupation: Trainer

Horse racing career
- Sport: Horse racing
- Career wins: 2,000+ (ongoing)

Major racing wins
- Mazarine Stakes (1980); Ontario Matron Stakes (1982, 2004, 2005, 2006); Vigil Stakes (1982, 2007); Display Stakes (1985, 2006, 2011); Canadian Stakes (1987); Sir Barton Stakes (1992); Duchess Stakes (1995); Maryland Million Distaff Handicap (1996); Ontario Fashion Stakes (1996); Classy 'N Smart Stakes (1997, 1999); Maple Leaf Stakes (1997, 2003, 2004); Ballade Stakes (1998, 2005); Natalma Stakes (1998, 2001); La Prevoyante Stakes (1999); Atto Mile (2001); Play The King Stakes (2001, 2008); Princess Elizabeth Stakes (2001); Shady Well Stakes (2001); Woodbine Oaks (2002); Algoma Stakes (2003, 2004, 2005); Bold Ruckus Stakes (2004); Canadian Derby (2004); Seagram Cup Stakes (2004, 2005); Bull Page Stakes (2008); Victoria Park Stakes (2004); Bessarabian Stakes (2005); Chief Bearhart Stakes (2005); Queenston Stakes (2005, 2007); Valedictory Stakes (2005); Overskate Stakes (2006); Bold Venture Stakes (2007); Coronation Futurity Stakes (2007, 2011); Plate Trial Stakes (2007); Woodstock Stakes (2007, 2008); Dominion Day Stakes (2008); Swynford Stakes (2009); Highlander Stakes (2010, 2011, 2012); Vandal Stakes (2009, 2011)

Significant horses
- Numerous Times, Ginger Gold; Organ Grinder, One For Rose, Maritimer

Sid C. Attard (born September 29, 1950, Birkirkara, Malta) is a Canada-based thoroughbred horse racing trainer. Members of his family emigrated to Canada in the 1960s, and his older brothers Joseph and Tino became racehorse trainers. Larry became one of the top jockeys in the country and a member of the Canadian Horse Racing Hall of Fame.

A trainer since 1977, Attard is based at Toronto's Woodbine Racetrack, where he has led all trainers in wins four times. On December 6, 2008, he won his 1,600th career race with Forever Gleaming. On November 14/2010 he won his 1,700th career race in the Autumn Stakes with Stunning Stag. In 2011, Sid was inducted into the Brampton Sports Hall Of Fame.

A resident of Bramalea, a neighbourhood in Brampton, Ontario, Attard and his wife Janice have three children. Their sons Paul and Jamie have followed in their father's footsteps and are trainers at Woodbine Racetrack.
