= Rafael Hernandez (jockey) =

Puerto Rican jockey

Personal information
- Born: 1984 (age 41–42) San Lorenzo, Puerto Rico
- Occupation: Jockey

Horse racing career
- Sport: Horse racing
- Career wins: 3,239 (12/20/24)

Major racing wins
- Grey Stakes (2014, 2017, 2021); American Turf Stakes (2015); Marine Stakes (2015); Nearctic Stakes (2015); Kennedy Road Stakes (2016, 2021); Ontario Matron Stakes (2016, 2023); Seaway Stakes (2016, 2023); Eclipse Stakes (2018); Dominion Day Stakes (2019, 2023); Hendrie Stakes (2019); Royal North Stakes (2019, 2022); Autumn Stakes (2020); Bold Venture Stakes (2020, 2021); E. P. Taylor Stakes (2020); Jacques Cartier Stakes (2020); King Edward Stakes (2020, 2021); Maple Leaf Stakes (2020, 2023); Marine Stakes (2020, 2021, 2022); Vigil Stakes (2020); Mazarine Stakes (2021, 2022); Seagram Cup Stakes (2021,2023); Dance Smartly Stakes (2022); Nassau Stakes (2022); Natalma Stakes (2022, 2024); Valedictory Stakes (2022); Canadian Stakes (2023, 2024); Connaught Cup Stakes (2023); Ontario Matron Stakes (2023); Bessarabian Stakes (2024); Fury Stakes (2024); Canadian Triple Crown; King's Plate (2015, 2022, 2024); Breeders' Stakes (2016, 2017, 2019, 2025)

Racing awards
- Leading jockey at Fairmount Park (2005-2008, 2010-2014); Sovereign Award for Outstanding Jockey (2020, 2025)

Significant horses
- Caitlinhergrtness, Channel Maker, Moira, Shaman Ghost, Pink Lloyd

Rafael Manuel Hernandez (born 1984 or 1985) is a Puerto Rican thoroughbred racing jockey. During his career, he led in wins at Fairmount Park from 2005 to 2014 except for 2009. At graded stakes races, Hernandez has won 24 Grade III, 17 Grade II and 3 Grade I events. He also finished in thirteenth at the Breeders' Cup Juvenile Fillies Turf in 2015.

At the Canadian Triple Crown of Thoroughbred Racing from 2015 onward, Hernandez won three King's Plate and four Breeders' Stakes. He finished second at the Prince of Wales Stakes four times. As a Canadian Triple Tiara of Thoroughbred Racing competitor, Hernandez won the 2020 Wonder Where Stakes and 2022 Woodbine Oaks. He was also second at the 2020 Bison City Stakes. Hernandez has won more than 3,200 races and accumulated over $70 million in prize winnings. He received the Sovereign Award for Outstanding Jockey for 2020 and 2025.

== Early life and education ==
Hernandez was born during the mid-1980s in San Lorenzo, Puerto Rico. He became interested in horse racing as a teenager. Until the early 2000s, Hernandez attended the Vocational Equestrian School of Puerto Rico.

== Career ==
=== Racecourses ===
For his apprentice jockey career, Hernandez went to Tampa Bay Downs in 2004 and had his first victory there. He had the most victories at Ellis Park Race Course that year for apprentice riders. Hernandez started competing at Fairmount Park after the apprenticeship ended in the mid-2000s. While at Fairmount from 2005 to 2014, he led in wins each year except for 2009.

In February 2016, Hernandez was injured during a Gulfstream Park race. This resulted in "a broken collarbone, fractured ribs and had to have one of his kidneys removed." During June 2016, he resumed his career before moving to Woodbine Racetrack. Hernandez had the most wins there during 2020.

=== Major races ===
At the 2014 Grey Stakes, Hernandez became a graded stakes race winner. As part of his wins, Hernandez has won the Marine Stakes four times as a Grade III competitor. He has been in first place at 24 Grade III, 17 Grade II and 3 Grade I races. During this time period, he finished in thirteenth at the Breeders' Cup Juvenile Fillies Turf during 2015.

At Canadian Triple Crown of Thoroughbred Racing events, Hernandez had first places at the Queen's Plate during 2015 with Shaman Ghost and 2022 with Moira. After the event was renamed to the King's Plate, he re-won the event in 2024. In the Prince of Wales Stakes, Hernandez was second during 2015 and 2017. Additional second places by him were in 2020 and 2024. From 2016 to 2019, he was the Breeders' Stakes champion three times. Hernandez won this event during 2025.

In Canadian Triple Tiara of Thoroughbred Racing events, Hernandez was second at the 2022 Bison City Stakes. At the Woodbine Oaks, he was first in that year's edition. At the Wonder Where Stakes, he won the 2020 event.

== Overall performance and personal life ==
Hernandez received the Sovereign Award for Outstanding Jockey for 2020 and 2025. In Equibase rankings for North American races, his best performances were eighth place in 2011 wins and twenty-seventh place in 2020 earnings. Hernandez has won over 3,200 races and accumulated more than $70 million in prize winnings. He is married and has three children.
