= George R. Gardiner =

Canadian businessman and philanthropist

- Born: April 25, 1917; Toronto, Ontario, Canada
- Died: December 7, 1997 (aged 80); Caledon East, Ontario, Canada
- Resting place: Mount Pleasant Cemetery, Toronto
- Education: University of Toronto, Harvard University
- Occupations: Stockbroker, lawyer, racehorse owner/breeder, art Collector, philanthropist
- Known for: Gardiner Museum
- Board member of: Gardiner Watson Ltd., Toronto Stock Exchange, Harlequin Enterprises
- Spouse: 2) Helen E. McMinn
- Children: 3, (from 1st marriage)
- Awards: Sovereign Award for Outstanding Owner (1976); Jockey Club of Canada Man of the Year (1985); Order of Canada (1989); Canadian Horse Racing Hall of Fame (2000)

George Ryerson Gardiner, OC (April 25, 1917 – December 7, 1997) was a Canadian businessman, philanthropist and co-founder of the Gardiner Museum, the only museum in Canada devoted exclusively to ceramic art.

== Early years ==
Gardiner was born in Toronto and educated at University of Toronto Schools ('35), the University of Toronto (3T9 B.Comm) and Harvard University (MBA).

== Early career ==
George Gardiner began his career running a munitions factory during World War II and later started his stock brokerage firm Gardiner Watson Limited which he sold to Dean Witter in 1983. He then opened the first discount brokerage firm in Canada which he sold to TD Bank in 1987. He was also past president of the Toronto Stock Exchange, founder of Gardiner Oil and Gas Ltd. and Scott's Hospitality Inc. which acquired the Kentucky Fried Chicken rights for Canada in 1962.

Following a marriage in which he had three children, he married Helen Gardiner and with her co-founded the Gardiner Museum of Ceramic Arts in Toronto.

== Gardiner Farms ==
George Gardiner was a major figure in Canadian Thoroughbred horse racing. In the 1950s he established Gardiner Farms, a breeding operation in Caledon East, Ontario. He raced horses in Canada and the United States. Among his notable runners was St. Vincent who raced in the U.S. and who in 1955 set or equaled four course records, including a North American and World record, and was voted that year's American Champion Male Turf Horse.

== Honors ==
In 1976, Gardiner won a Sovereign Award for Outstanding Owner. In 1989 he was appointed an Officer of the Order of Canada. In 1990, Gardiner's family endowed a chair in his name at the Schulich School of Business at York University in Toronto, dedicated to enhancing the teaching of ethics in management. The first holder of the George R. Gardiner Professorship in Business Ethics, Wesley Cragg was appointed in 1992, and was succeeded in 2007 by Andrew Crane.In 2000, he was inducted in the Canadian Horse Racing Hall of Fame in the builders category.
