= Arthur H. Warner =

Canadian racehorse trainer and jockey

Arthur H. Warner was a Canadian Thoroughbred racehorse trainer and a former jockey in Toronto. He rose to fame in the late 1950s after winning the Marine Stakes in 1958 and 1959 as a trainer. He won more than 80 stakes throughout his career and was inducted into the Canadian Horse Racing Hall of Fame in 1984, as a trainer.

== Biography ==
Warner was born on July 25, 1911, in Toronto, Ontario, Canada. He began his early career with horses as a jockey, and later moved to training.

Warner's most famous purebred was Anita's Son, who was also inducted in the Canadian Horse Racing Hall of Fame in 2005, as one of the best thoroughbred horses in Canadian history. He was a highly respected trainer, known to be very loving to his horses.

Warner died in July 1986, at the age of 75.

=== Major wins ===
Warner's major wins are in Marine Stakes and Virgil Stakes. He also shares the record for the most wins in Marine Stakes as a trainer.

=== Top runners ===
Anita's Son

First Minister

Forest Path

Dr. Em Jay
