= Daniel Vella =

Canadian horse trainer

Personal information
- Born: November 18, 1955 (age 70) Toronto, Ontario, Canada
- Occupation: Horse trainer

Horse racing career
- Sport: Horse racing
- Career wins: 590+ (ongoing)

Major racing wins
- Sir Barton Stakes (1985); Hendrie Stakes (1990); Nearctic Stakes (1990, 1994, 1995); Cup and Saucer Stakes (1992); Autumn Stakes (1993, 1995, 2004); Hollywood Derby (1993); American Derby (1993); Eclipse Stakes (1993, 1995, 2003, 2004); E. P. Taylor Stakes (1993); Grey Stakes (1993, 1996, 1997); Natalma Stakes (1993, 1994); Wonder Where Stakes (1993, 1994, 2006); Col. R. S. McLaughlin Handicap (1994); Ontario Debutante Stakes (1994, 2005); Kennedy Road Stakes (1995, 1996, 1997); Plate Trial Stakes (1995, 1996); Royal North Stakes (1995); Seaway Stakes (1995); Summer Stakes (1995); Toronto Cup Stakes (1995); Canadian Stakes (1996); Princess Elizabeth Stakes (1996); Ontario Matron Stakes (1996, 2003); Longfellow Stakes (1997); Mazarine Stakes (2005); Star Shoot Stakes (2008); Play The King Stakes (2012); South Ocean Stakes (2015) Canadian Classic Race wins: Queen's Plate (1994); Breeders' Stakes (1992, 1994)

Racing awards
- Sovereign Award for Outstanding Trainer (1994, 1995)

Significant horses
- Basqueian, Explosive Red, Touch Gold

Daniel J. "Dan" Vella (born November 18, 1955) is a Canadian Champion Thoroughbred racehorse trainer.

Born in Toronto, Ontario, Vella was introduced to thoroughbred horse racing by an uncle who owned horses. After graduating from high school, Vella went to work at a racetrack in his native Toronto. After an apprenticeship he worked as an assistant trainer with Patrick Collins and got his first win in 1985. Following the death of Patrick Collins in 1990, Vella took over as head trainer for the prominent Woodbine-based Knob Hill Stable where he remained until joining the racing operations of Frank Stronach in late 1991.

== Biography ==
Training for Stronach Stables, between 1993 and 1998 Vella spent a good part of his time competing in the United States but won important races at Woodbine including Canada's most prestigious race in 1994, the Queen's Plate. That year, he was voted the Canadian Sovereign Award for Outstanding Trainer and repeated as Champion trainer in 1995. After parting ways with Stonach Stables he remained working in the United States then returned to a Toronto base in 2003.
