= Larry Attard =

Canadian jockey

Personal information
- Born: December 31, 1951 (age 74) Malta
- Occupation: Jockey

Horse racing career
- Sport: Horse racing
- Career wins: 2,366

Major racing wins
- Colin Stakes (1977, 1986, 1991); Cup and Saucer Stakes (1986); Autumn Stakes (1988, 1990); Jammed Lovely Stakes (1989); Kennedy Road Stakes (1990); Royal North Stakes (1993); Col. R. S. McLaughlin Stakes (1995) Canadian Classic Race wins: Queen's Plate (1983); Prince of Wales Stakes (1992, 1995)

Racing awards
- Sovereign Award for Outstanding Jockey (1983, 1986); Leading jockey at Woodbine Racetrack (1983, 1986, 1987); Avelino Gomez Memorial Award (1993)

Honours
- Mississauga Sports Hall of Fame (2001); Canadian Horse Racing Hall of Fame (2001)

Significant horses
- Bompago, Kiridashi, Benburb, Let's Go Blue
- Updated on February 23, 2007

Larry Attard (born December 31, 1951, in Malta) is a retired Hall of Fame Champion jockey and current horse trainer in Canadian Thoroughbred horse racing.

Born into a Maltese family who emigrated to Canada, Attard has three older brothers who became Thoroughbred trainers. In 1973 Larry Attard began riding and although hampered by many injuries, his career lasted twenty-five years. He rode at Ontario's Greenwood, Fort Erie and Woodbine Racetracks. He won three riding titles at Woodbine and was the leading jockey in Ontario three times. Twice voted the Sovereign Award for Outstanding Jockey, among his numerous stakes race wins, in 1983 Larry Attard won Canada's most prestigious race, the Queen's Plate.

For his contribution to Thoroughbred horse racing, in 1993 Larry Attard was voted the Avelino Gomez Memorial Award. He retired after another injury-filled year in 1997 and in 2001 was inducted into the Mississauga, Ontario Sports Hall of Fame and the Canadian Horse Racing Hall of Fame.
