= Summer Stakes (Canada) =

Turf horse race in Canada

- Class: Grade I
- Location: Woodbine Racetrack; Toronto, Ontario
- Inaugurated: 1953
- Race type: Thoroughbred – Flat racing
- Website: woodbineentertainment.com

Race information
- Distance: 1 mile (8.0 furlongs)
- Surface: Turf
- Track: Left-handed
- Qualification: Two-year-olds
- Weight: Scale Weight
- Purse: Can$400,000 (2021)

The Summer Stakes is a Thoroughbred horse race run annually in mid-September at Woodbine Racetrack in Toronto, Ontario, Canada. Contested on turf over a distance of 1 mile (8 furlongs), it is open to two-year-old horses. It became a Grade II in 1999 but in 2006 was downgraded to a Grade III status. In 2012, it returned to Grade II status. In 2018, the Jockey Club of Canada moved it to Grade I status.

Part of the Breeders' Cup Challenge series, the winner of the Summer Stakes automatically qualifies for the Breeders' Cup Juvenile Turf.

Inaugurated in 1953 at Fort Erie Racetrack as a sprint race on dirt, the Summer Stakes was moved to the turf in 1962. Since inception it has been run at various distances:

- 5 furlongs : 1953–1956 on dirt at Fort Erie Racetrack
- 5.5 furlongs : 1957–1960, 1961 on dirt at Fort Erie Racetrack
- 8 furlongs (1 mile) : 1962–1984 on turf at Fort Erie Racetrack, since 1985 on turf at Woodbine Racetrack

The race was run in two divisions in 1958, 1967, and 1969.

== Records ==
Speed record:

- 1:34.38 – Good Samaritan (2016)

Most wins by an owner:

- 8 – Sam-Son Farm (1980, 1984, 1985, 1986, 1987, 1989, 1990, 1993)

Most wins by a jockey:

- 6 – Robin Platts (1975, 1976, 1981, 1982, 1983, 1988)

Most wins by a trainer:

- 8 – James E. Day (1980, 1984, 1985, 1986, 1987, 1989, 1990, 1993)

== Winners ==
Year	Winner	Jockey	Trainer	Owner	Time
2026	Al Hudaiba (GB)	William Buick	Charlie Appleby	Godolphin	1:35.66
2025	Argos	Flavien Prat	Riley Mott	David S. Romanik	1:36.90
2024	New Century (GB)	Oisin Murphy	Andrew Balding	Qatar Racing	1:32.80
2023	Carson's Run	Dylan Davis	Christophe Clement	West Point Thoroughbreds & Steven Bouchey	1:35.70
2022	Mysterious Night (IRE)	William Buick	Charlie Appleby	Godolphin	1:34.98
2021	Albahr (GB)	Frankie Dettori	Charlie Appleby	Godolphin	1:35.77
2020	Gretzky The Great	Kazushi Kimura	Mark E. Casse	Gary Barber & Eclipse Thoroughbred Partners	1:34.53
2019	Decorated Invader	Irad Ortiz Jr.	Christophe Clement	West Point Thoroughbreds, William T Freeman & William Sandbrook	1:36.34
2018	Fog of War	Javier Castellano	Chad C. Brown	Peter M. Brant	1:33.90
2017	Untamed Domain	Joe Bravo	H. Graham Motion	West Point Thoroughbreds	1:34.73
2016	Good Samaritan	Joel Rosario	William Mott	China Horse Club & WinStar Farm	1:34.38
2015	Conquest Daddyo	Joe Bravo	Mark E. Casse	Conquest Stables	1:36.61
2014	Conquest Typhoon	Patrick Husbands	Mark E. Casse	Conquest Stables	1:41.10
2013	My Conquestadory	Eurico Rosa Da Silva	Mark E. Casse	Conquest Stables	1:34.81
2012	I'm Boundtoscore	Sarah Rook	Troy Rankin	Rankin/Davis	1:37.75
2011	Finale	John Velazquez	Todd Pletcher	Tabor/Magnier/Smith	1:35.51
2010	Pluck	Garrett Gomez	Todd Pletcher	Team Valor International	1:37.70
2009	Bridgetown	Robert Landry	Kenneth McPeek	Melynk Racing Stables	1:35.04
2008	Grand Adventure	Eurico Rosa Da Silva	Mark Frostad	Sam-Son Farms	1:35.86
2007	Prussian	Kent Desormeaux	William I. Mott	Monticule LLC	1:35.26
2006	Dreaming of Anna	René Douglas	Wayne Catalano	Frank C. Calabrese	1:35.03
2005	Bear's Kid	Jim McAleney	Reade Baker	Bear Stables	1:40.35
2004	Dubleo	Corey Nakatani	Todd A. Pletcher	Scatuorchio/P. Wetterman	1:34.69
2003	Bachelor Blues	Todd Kabel	Josie Carroll	William C. Schettine	1:34.95
2002	Lismore Knight	Pat Day	Todd A. Pletcher	J. J. Pletcher/Barry Simon	1:35.33
2001	El Soprano	Gary Stevens	Kevin Attard	Stronach Stables	1:35.14
2000	Speed Gun	Emile Ramsammy	Steve Owens	Larry Spindler	1:34.51
1999	Four On The Floor	Jim McAleney	Alex McPherson	A. Cotey et al.	1:35.41
1998	Riddell's Creek	James McKnight	Beverly Buck	Clausen/Buck/Buck	1:37.40
1997	Patriot Love	Sandy Hawley	Roger Attfield	Kinghaven Farms	1:37.40
1996	Synastry Express	Mickey Walls	Bernard Girault	K-5 Stable	1:38.00
1995	Blazing Hot	Todd Kabel	Daniel J. Vella	Frank Stronach	1:35.00
1994	Native Regent	Dave Penna	David R. Bell	John A. Franks	1:34.40
1993	Comet Shine	David Clark	James E. Day	Sam-Son Farm	1:39.60
1992	Gobo	Richard Dos Ramos	R. Wright	Sheehan Farms	1:41.00
1991	Free At Last	Todd Kabel	Laurie Silvera	Silverbrook Stable	1:38.40
1990	Rainbows For Life	Brian Swatuk	James E. Day	Sam-Son Farm	1:36.60
1989	Sky Classic	Sandy Hawley	James E. Day	Sam-Son Farm	1:36.00
1988	Charlie Barley	Robin Platts	Grant Pearce	King Caledon Farm	1:37.00
1987	Regal Classic	Dave Penna	James E. Day	Sam-Son Farm	1:39.80
1986	Blue Finn	Dave Penna	James E. Day	Sam-Son Farm	1:46.60
1985	Grey Classic	Irwin Driedger	James E. Day	Sam-Son Farm	1:40.20
1984	Dauphin Fabuleux	Jeffrey Fell	James E. Day	Sam-Son Farm	1:38.60
1983	Hobbys Son	Robin Platts	Frank Passero Jr.	J. B. Racing Stable	1:37.60
1982	Kingsbridge	Robin Platts	John Tammaro Jr.	Kinghaven Farms	1:38.60
1981	Exclusive Canadian	Robin Platts	Gil Rowntree	B. K. Y. Stable	1:44.40
1980	Stutz Finwhale	George HoSang	James E. Day	Sam-Son Farm	1:37.00
1979	Sunny Premier	Gary Stahlbaum	Frank Merrill Jr.	Meadowview Stable	1:38.80
1978	Nonparrell	Sandy Hawley	Jerry C. Meyer	Syl Asadoorian	1:43.00
1977	Pernickety Pete	Sandy Hawley	George S. Nemett	Warren Beasley	1:43.00
1976	Sound Reason	Robin Platts	Gil Rowntree	Stafford Farms	1:43.40
1975	Ambassador B.	Robin Platts	Gil Rowntree	Stafford Farms	1:37.80
1974	L'Enjoleur	Sandy Hawley	Yonnie Starr	Jean-Louis Levesque	1:42.40
1973	Backstretch	Noel Turcotte	Carl F. Chapman	O'Maonaigh Abu Stable	1:39.20
1972	Zaca Spirit	Avelino Gomez	Clarke Whitaker	Bo-Teek Farm	1:38.20
1971	Jewel Prince	Noel Turcotte	Carl F. Chapman	Garden City Stable	1:39.40
1970	Winlord	Noel Turcotte	V. Walker	Bo-Teek Farm	1:39.40
1969	Tudor Queen	Avelino Gomez	Gil Rowntree	Stafford Farms	1:37.60
1969	Admiral's Road	James Kelly	Andrew G. Smithers	Mrs. C. H. Sturrock	1:39.20
1968	Viceregal	Richard Grubb	Gordon J. McCann	Windfields Farm	1:38.60
1967	Son Costume	James Kelly	R. E. Fisher	Paison Stable	1:41.40
1967	No Parando	Noel Turcotte	Frank Merrill Jr.	Est. F. A. Sherman	1:40.60
1966	Cool Reception	Avelino Gomez	Lou Cavalaris Jr.	Margaret Seitz/Joan Reid	1:39.20
1965	Titled Hero	Avelino Gomez	Patrick MacMurchy	Peter K. Marshall	1:38.80
1964	Flyalong	Clifford Potts	Duke Campbell	T. Hays / D. Weldon	1:39.80
1963	Northern Dancer	Paul Bohenko	Horatio Luro	Windfields Farm	1:43.40
1962	Son Blue	G. Roser	Willie Thurner	J. Farr	1:40.40
1961	Royal Spirit	Al Coy	John Passero	Stafford Farms	1:12.60
1960	Song of Wine	Avelino Gomez	R. Harper	The Pheasant Stable	1:05.40
1959	Hidden Treasure	C. M. Clark	John Passero	William R. Beasley	1:05.40
1958	Willowdale Boy	Sam Cosentino	Lou Cavalaris Jr.	P. Del Greco	1:07.00
1958	Grand Passion	R. Gonzalez	Yonnie Starr	Maloney & Smythe	1:06.00
1957	Silver Ship	Pat Remillard	Gordon M. Huntley	Gordon F. Hall	1:06.00
1956	Mister Jive	G. Nadeau	Bud Carter	John L. Appelbaum	0:59.20
1955	Bunty's Flight	George Walker	Yonnie Starr	Larkin Maloney	1:00.40
1954	Charms	George Walker	P. Prieto	Stafford Farms	1:00.40
1953	Seville	Mario Beneito	P. Prieto	Stafford Farms	1:00.00

* In 1992, Desert Waves finished first but was disqualified and set back to sixth.

== See also ==
- List of Canadian flat horse races
