= Nassau Stakes (Canada) =

- Class: Grade II
- Location: Woodbine Racetrack; Toronto, Ontario
- Inaugurated: 1956
- Race type: Thoroughbred – Flat racing
- Website: www.woodbineentertainment.com

Race information
- Distance: 1 mile (8 furlongs)
- Surface: Turf
- Track: Left-handed
- Qualification: Fillies & Mares, Three-years-old & up
- Weight: Assigned
- Purse: $200,000 (2026)

The Nassau Stakes is a Canadian Thoroughbred horse race held annually at Woodbine Racetrack in Toronto, Ontario. A Grade II event raced in late June or early July, it is open to horses aged three and older and run over a distance of one mile on turf. Currently, the Nassau Stakes offers a purse of $200,000.

Inaugurated in 1956, it was raced on dirt until 1968 when it was shifted permanently to the turf. Over the years, it has been run at various distances both at the Woodbine Racetrack and at Fort Erie Race Track:

On dirt:

- 7 furlongs : 1956–1958 at Woodbine
- 1 mile : 1959–1966 at Woodbine, 1967 at Fort Erie

On turf:

- 1 mile : beginning 2010 at Woodbine Racetrack
- 1 1/16 miles : 1968 & 1994 at Fort Erie, 1969–1993, 1995 to present at Woodbine

The Nassau Stakes was run in two divisions in 1978, 1982, 1983, 1985, 1989, 1990

== Records ==
Time record:

- 1:39.60 – Bold Ruritana (1996 on Woodbine Racetrack) (1 1/16 miles turf)
- 1:32.40 - Lady Speightspeare & Crystal Cliffs (FR) (2022) (1 mile turf)

Most wins:

- 2 – Belle Geste (1971, 1972)
- 2 – Momigi (1976, 1977)
- 2 – Pointe Aux Pins (1978, 1979)
- 2 – Eternal Search (1982, 1983)
- 2 – Lake Country (1985, 1986)
- 2 – Radiant Ring (1991, 1992)
- 2 – Bold Ruritana (1995, 1996)
- 2 – Solid Appeal (2013, 2014)

Most wins by an owner:

- 6 – Sam-Son Farm (1989, 1991, 1992, 1998, 2001, 2007)

Most wins by a jockey:

- 5 – Todd Kabel (1994, 1998, 2001, 2004, 2007)

Most wins by a trainer:

- 4 – Roger Attfield (1987, 1988, 2020, 2022)

== Winners of the Nassau Stakes ==
Year	Winner	Age	Jockey	Trainer	Owner	Time
2026	Vina Arana (IRE)	5	Adam Beschizza	Jack Sisterson	Sterling Stables and MHM Stables	1:35.40
2025	Ocean Club	5	Sofia Vives	Thomas F. Proctor	Glen Hill Farm	1:33.62
2024	Implicated	4	Declan Cannon	Brendan P. Walsh	Bradley Thoroughbreds, Belmar Racing and Breeding LLC, Cambron Equine LLC and Laura Leigh Stable	1:35.50
2023	Fev Rover (IRE)	5	Patrick Husbands	Mark E Casse	Tracy Farmer	1:40.03
2022 (dh)	Lady Speightspeare	4	Emma-Jayne Wilson	Roger Attfield	Charles E. Fipke	1:32.40
2022 (dh)	Crystal Cliffs (FR)	5	Rafael Manuel Hernandez	H. Graham Motion	Michael Dubb, Madket Stables LLC and Wonder Stables	1:32.40
2021	Jolie Olympica	5	Luis Contreras	Josie Carroll	Fox Hill Farms	1:34.83
2020	Elizabeth Way	4	Emma-Jayne Wilson	Roger Attfield	John J. McCormack	1:35.30
2019	Secret Message	4	Trevor McCarthy	H.Graham Motion	Madaket Stables, ERJ Racing et al.	1:35.30
2018	Niigon's Eclipse	5	Gary Boulanger	Rachel Halden	Chiefswood Stable	1:32.74
2017	Starship Jubilee	4	Eurico Rosa Da Silva	Kevin Attard	Kevin Attard/Soli Mehta	1:36.86
2016	Lexie Lou	5	Patrick Husbands	Mark E. Casse	Gary Barber	1:32.98
2015	Sky Treasure	5	Gary Boulanger	Mark E. Casse	John C. Oxley	1:33.54
2014	Solid Appeal	5	Jesse M. Campbell	Reade Baker	Jim & Susan Hill	1:33.04
2013	Solid Appeal	4	Jesse M. Campbell	Reade Baker	Jim & Susan Hill	1:34.01
2012	Marketing Mix	4	Julien Leparoux	Thomas F. Proctor	Glen Hill Farm	1:37.74
2011	Bay to Bay	4	Luis Contreras	Brian Lynch	Robert Smithen	1:36.48
2010	Simply Splendid	5	Chantal Sutherland	Gail Cox	J. Menary & Gail Cox	1:34.23
2009	Rutherienne	5	Alan Garcia	Christophe Clement	Virginia Kraft Payson	1:41.89
2008	Callwood Dancer	4	Eurico Rosa Da Silva	Roger Attfield	Harlequin Ranches	1:40.46
2007	Strike Softly	4	Todd Kabel	Mark Frostad	Sam-Son Farm	1:39.90
2006	Naissance Royale	4	Kent Desormeaux	Christophe Clement	Monceaux Stable	1:46.16
2005	Que Puntual	5	Cornelio Velásquez	Angel Penna Jr.	Earle I. Mack	1:41.96
2004	Inish Glora	6	Todd Kabel	Macdonald Benson	Robert J. Costigan	1:40.38
2003	Strait From Texas	4	Richard Dos Ramos	Paul Buttigieg	James Michael	1:42.92
2002	Siringas	4	José A. Santos	Christophe Clement	Skymarc Farm	1:41.01
2001	Only To You	5	Todd Kabel	Mark Frostad	Sam-Son Farm	1:47.31
2000	Heliotrope	5	Neil Poznansky	David R. Bell	R. F. & J. E. Shaw	1:40.14
1999	Anguilla	4	Robert Landry	Tom Skiffington Jr.	John & Glenn Sikura	1:41.52
1998	Colorful Vices	5	Todd Kabel	Mark Frostad	Sam-Son Farm	1:41.80
1997	Classic Wonder	5	Mickey Walls	John P. MacKenzie	Rudy Singh	1:41.00
1996	Bold Ruritana	6	Robert Landry	Barbara Minshall	Minshall Farms	1:39.60
1995	Bold Ruritana	5	Robert Landry	Barbara Minshall	Minshall Farms	1:41.20
1994	Strong and Steady	4	Todd Kabel	Dan Vella	John Sikura Jr. et al.	1:41.20
1993	Dance For Donna	4	Robert Landry	Sherry Noakes	Aubrey W. Minshall	1:43.60
1992	Radiant Ring *	4	Garrett Gomez	James E. Day	Sam-Son Farm	1:41.00
1991	Radiant Ring	3	Pat Day	James E. Day	Sam-Son Farm	1:42.20
1990	Seattle Sangue	5	Larry Attard	Danny O'Callaghan	John Sikura Jr.	1:40.80
1990	Maison Close	5	Dave Penna	Tom Skiffington Jr.	John Sikura Jr.	1:41.00
1989	Regal Wonder	5	Sandy Hawley	James E. Day	Sam-Son Farm	1:43.60
1989	Fieldy	6	Pat Day	Tom Skiffington Jr.	Seltzer/Fernwood Stable	1:43.40
1988	Anglia	4	Robbie King Jr.	Norman E. Smith	Golden Willow Farm	1:42.00
1987	Carotene	4	Don Seymour	Roger Attfield	Kinghaven Farms	1:43.20
1986	Lake Country	5	Jeffrey Fell	Donnie Walker	Prowse / Mclntosh	1:43.80
1985	Lake Country	4	Jeffrey Fell	Donnie Walker	Prowse / McIntosh	1:46.00
1985	Annie Edge	5	Jim Walford	Jonathan Sheppard	Augustin Stable	1:46.00
1984	Northern Blossom	4	Dan Beckon	Gil Rowntree	B. K. Y. Stable	1:44.60
1983	Face The Verdict	4	David Clark	James C. Bentley	D. W. Carmichael	1:47.20
1983	Eternal Search	5	Gary Stahlbaum	James C. Bentley	Jim Dandy Stable	1:47.00
1982	Eternal Search	4	Brian Swatuk	Janet Bedford	Jim Dandy Stable	1:43.40
1982	Sunny Sparkler	3	Jean-Luc Samyn	Scotty Schulhofer	Greyhound Stable	1:44.60
1981	Suave Princess	3	Dave Dennie	Emile Allain	John Sikura Jr.	1:45.40
1980	Smidge Girl	5	Gary Stahlbaum	Jacque Dumas	Peggy & John Petrakos	1:43.40
1979	Pointe Aux Pins *	5	Gary Stahlbaum	Gerry Belanger	N. Rajnovich	1:44.20
1978	Pointe Aux Pins	4	Paul Souter	Gerry Belanger	N. Rajnovich	1:43.00
1978	Majestic Kahala	4	Sandy Hawley	James Mort Hardy	Windhaven	1:43.60
1977	Momigi	5	Sandy Hawley	John Morahan	Koichiro Hayata	1:52.20
1976	Momigi	4	Sandy Hawley	John Morahan	Koichiro Hayata	1:45.00
1975	Reasonable Win	3	John B. LeBlanc	Fred H. Loschke	Hammer Kopf Farm	1:42.20
1974	Two Rings	4	James Kelly	Andrew G. Smithers	Kinghaven Farms	1:44.40
1973	Connie Pat	5	James Kelly	Donnie Walker	Conn Smythe	1:44.20
1972	Belle Geste	4	Noel Turcotte	Carl F. Chapman	Mrs. W. D. Latimer	1:43.40
1971	Belle Geste	3	John Bell	Carl F. Chapman	Mrs. W. D. Latimer	1:42.80
1970	A. T's Olie	3	Rudy L. Turcotte	Willard C. Freeman	Peter D. Fuller	1:42.60
1969	Plegada	5	Hugo Dittfach	Lou Cavalaris Jr.	Gardiner Farm	1:44.20
1968	Forest Path	4	Jim Fitzsimmons	Arthur H. Warner	Lanson Farm	1:42.40
1967	Ice Water	4	Avelino Gomez	Lou Cavalaris Jr.	Gardiner Farm	1:37.00
1966	Kerensa	3	Avelino Gomez	Frank H. Merrill Jr.	Mrs. H. A. Luro	1:35.40
1965	Royal Tara	4	John B. LeBlanc	Glenn Magnusson	Stafford Farms	1:36.00
1964	Barbara	4	Wayne Harris	J. W. Woods	S. Cocomile	1:40.00
1963	Reluctant Deb	5	Jerry Harrison	J. Simon	J. Simon	1:37.40
1962	I Recall	3	Evan L. Anyon	Morris Fishman	B. & G. Stable	1:35.20
1961	Purple Bow	4	K. Robinson	A. Hickling	Newtondale Stable	1:37.60
1960	Wonder Where	4	Hugo Dittfach	Yonnie Starr	Maloney & Smythe	1:36.40
1959	Kitty Girl	5	Hugo Dittfach	Yonnie Starr	Maloney & Smythe	1:36.20
1958	Windy Answer	3	Ben Sorensen	Gordon McCann	Windfields Farm	1:23.40
1957	Pink Velvet	3	Pat Remillard	John Passero	William R. Beasley	1:23.20
1956	Baffin Bay	4	Ken Clemes	M. Long	Mrs. R. Y. Graul Jr.	1:23.60

- In 1979, Christy's Mount finished first but was disqualified and set back to second.
- In 1992, Lady Shirl finished first but following a positive test for a banned medication was disqualified and placed last.

== See also ==
- List of Canadian flat horse races
