= Duchess Stakes =

Horse race

- Class: Ungraded Stakes
- Location: Woodbine Racetrack; Toronto, Ontario, Canada
- Inaugurated: 1956
- Race type: Thoroughbred - Flat racing
- Website: web.archive.org/web/20100316214346/http://www.woodbineentertainment.com:80/qct/default.asp

Race information
- Distance: 7 furlongs
- Surface: Polytrack
- Track: left-handed
- Qualification: Three-year-old fillies
- Weight: Allowances
- Purse: $96,363 (2015)

The Duchess Stakes is a Thoroughbred horse race run annually at Woodbine Racetrack in Toronto, Ontario, Canada. It is open to three-year-old fillies. Held during the first part of August, it is contested over a distance of 7 furlongs on Polytrack synthetic dirt. It currently offers a purse of $96,363 with an additional $50,000 for Ontario-bred horses. Previously a Grade III race, it lost its graded status in 2006.

Inaugurated in 1956 at Fort Erie Racetrack, the Duchess Stakes has also been hosted by Toronto's Greenwood Raceway. Since inception the race has been run at various distances:

- 8.5 furlongs (1 1/16 miles) : 1956-1966 and 1970-1979 at Fort Erie Racetrack, 1967 at Greenwood Raceway, 1969 at Woodbine Racetrack, 1 1/16 miles; Fort Erie; main track
- 8 furlongs (1 mile) : 1968 at Greenwood Raceway
- 7.5 furlongs : 2006 at Woodbine Racetrack
- 7 furlongs : 1980-2005 and since 2007 at Woodbine Racetrack

== Records ==
Speed record: (at current distance of 7 furlongs)

- 1:22.03 - Lemon Maid (2005)

Most wins by a jockey:

- 4 - Todd Kabel (1992, 1994, 1999, 2005)

Most wins by a trainer:

- 3 - Glenn Magnusson (1963, 1964, 1973)
- 3 - John Morahan (1974, 1975, 1980)
- 3 - Macdonald Benson (1978, 1996, 2008)

Most wins by an owner:

- 4 - Stafford Farms (1963, 1964, 1966, 1970)

== Winners ==
Year	Winner	Jockey	Trainer	Owner	Time
2015	Her Majesty's Flag	Omar Moreno	David Cotey	Dominion Bloodstock/Butzer	1:22.91
2014	Pirate's Trove	Florent Geroux	Mike Stidham	Shahania Racing	1:22.75
2013	Leigh Court	Gary Boulanger	Josie Carroll	Melnyk Racing Stables	1:22.95
2012	Spirited Miss	Patrick Husbands	Mark Casse	John Oxley	1:23.48
2011	Anne's Beauty	Patrick Husbands	Paul Attard	Robert Smithen	1:22.83
2010	Sharp Secretary	Eurico da Silva	Lorne Richards	Landsdowne Stables	1:23.45
2009	Carem Crescent	Eurico da Silva	Malcolm Pierce	Eugene Melnyk	1:22.50
2008	Sugar Bay	Chantal Sutherland	Macdonald Benson	Augustin Stable	1:22.38
2007	Bear Now	Jerry Baird	Reade Baker	Bear Stables Ltd.	1:22.15
2006	Vestrey Lady	James McAleney	Reade Baker	Harlequin Ranches	1:31.74
2005	Lemon Maid	Todd Kabel	Malcolm Pierce	Live Oak Plantation	1:22.03
2004	Blonde Executive	Richard Dos Ramos	A. Radlie Loney	Bruno Brothers Farm	1:23.26
2003	Finally Here	Patrick Husbands	Tom Amoss	Pop-A-Top LLC	1:24.15
2002	Mulrainy	Chantal Sutherland	Thomas O'Keefe	Wings of Erin Farm	1:23.98
2001	Meadow Gem	David Clark	Robert P. Tiller	LQ Racing/Kinghaven Farms et al.	1:22.48
2000	Heat It Up	Gerry Olguin	Catherine Day Phillips	Kingfield Farms	1:22.50
1999	Gregorian Chance	Todd Kabel	Brian P. Morgan	D. Morrison & K. Schmidt	1:22.81
1998	Kissedbyacrusader	Steve Bahen	Michael Wright, Jr.	Bruno Schickedanz	1:22.80
1997	Cotton Carnival	Robert Landry	Roger Attfield	Windhaven	1:24.80
1996	Autumn Slew	Robert Landry	Macdonald Benson	Augustin Stable	1:23.40
1995	Heavenly Punch	Dave Penna	Sid C. Attard	C. C. Stable	1:23.80
1994	Mysteriously	Todd Kabel	Daniel J. Vella	Frank Stronach	1:23.40
1993	Elderberry Drive	Dave Penna	David Guitard	Kings Lane Farm	1:23.40
1992	Parisinthespring	Todd Kabel	Laurie Silvera	Silverbrook Stable	1:24.20
1991	Flicker Queen	Ray Sabourin	John A. Ross	Aubrey W. Minshall	1:24.60
1990	Premier Question	Richard Dos Ramos	David R. Bell	John A. Franks	1:22.80
1989	Blushing Katy	Gunnar Lindberg	Phil England	Kingsbrook Farm	1:23.80
1988	Volterra	Sandy Hawley	Patrick Collins	Knob Hill Stable	1:24.20
1987	Burgandy Dancer	Lloyd Duffy	Sheldon Wolfe	Willow Downs Farm	1:24.00
1986	Miss Tressette	Larry Attard	Joe Attard	F. & C. Russo	1:24.40
1985	Greyechel	Dan Beckon	George M. Carter	F. & J. Cosentino	1:24.00
1984	Baldski's Holiday	Gary Stahlbaum	Michael J. Doyle	Eaton Hall Farm	1:23.40
1983	L'Epee	John Bell	Emile M. Allain	Terforth Farm	1:25.00
1982	Ambassador of Luck	Antonio Graell	Flint S. Schulhofer	Richard Ransom	1:23.00
1981	Eternal Search	Brian Swatuk	Ted Mann	Jim Dandy Stable	1:23.60
1980	Solartic	Robin Platts	John Morahan	Douglas Banks	1:23.80
1979	Kamar	Sandy Hawley	Emile M. Allain	B. K. Y. Stable	1:44.20
1978	Flower Princess	Robin Platts	Macdonald Benson	Windfields Farm	1:44.60
1977	Majestic Kahala	Gary Stahlbaum	James M. Hardy	Windhaven	1:43.60
1976	Regal Gal	Earlie Fires	Chris W. Voyce	Edward A. Cox Jr.	1:42.80
1975	Momigi	Gary Melanson	John Morahan	Koichiro Hayata	1:42.60
1974	Trudie Tudor	Sandy Hawley	John Morahan	Douglas Banks	1:42.60
1973	Sharp Quill	Lloyd Duffy	Glenn Magnusson	Lucky C. Stable	1:44.20
1972	Susceptible	Greg McCarron	Del W. Carroll	Windfields Farm	1:43.20
1971	Essie Bs Venture	James Kelly	Andrew G. Smithers	E. Lieberman	1:45.60
1970	Tudor Queen	Robin Platts	Gil Rowntree	Stafford Farms	1:44.40
1969	Not Too Shy	Avelino Gomez	Donnie Walker	Conn Smythe	1:44.60
1968	Leprechaun Lady	Richard Grubb	J. Mack	M. H. Dudgeon	1:38.00
1967	Toward	James Kelly	John W. Russell	Mrs. John W. Sifton	1:42.00
1966	Royal Tara	Hugo Dittfach	J. Hechter	Stafford Farms	1:44.80
1965	Ciboulette	Noel Turcotte	Duke Campbell	Jean-Louis Levesque	1:44.80
1964	Royal Spirit	J. Davidson	Glenn Magnusson	Stafford Farms	1:46.20
1963	Royal Spirit	Hugo Dittfach	Glenn Magnusson	Stafford Farms	1:44.80
1962	Reluctant Deb	G. Roser	A. Hickling	J. Simon	1:45.00
1961	Purple Bow	Don Hale	Frank Merrill, Jr.	Newtondale Stable	1:49.60
1960	Chick Miss	J. A. Adams	Frank Merrill, Jr.	R. Gian & Tosch	1:45.20
1959	Kitty Girl	Hugo Dittfach	Yonnie Starr	Maloney & Smythe	1:45.60
1958	Real Cute	A. Nash	J. Calhoun	View Hulloa Farms	1:44.60
1957	Kitty Girl	Herb Lindberg	Yonnie Starr	Maloney & Smythe	1:47.00
1956	Infusion	Alex Wick	D. Kennedy	Kennedy-Veale Stable	1:43.40
