= Natalma Stakes =

- Class: Grade I
- Location: Woodbine Racetrack; Toronto, Ontario
- Inaugurated: 1965
- Race type: Thoroughbred – Flat racing
- Website: woodbineentertainment.com

Race information
- Distance: 1 mile (8 furlongs)
- Surface: Turf
- Track: Left-handed
- Qualification: Two-year-old fillies
- Weight: 121 lbs.
- Purse: Can$400,000

The Natalma Stakes is a Canadian Thoroughbred horse race held annually at Woodbine Racetrack in Toronto, Ontario. Run in mid-September, the Grade I race is run at a distance of one mile (8 furlongs) on turf and is open to two-year-old fillies. In 2016, the purse was increased to Can$250,000.

Part of the Breeders' Cup Challenge series, the winner of the Natalma Stakes automatically qualifies for the Breeders' Cup Juvenile Fillies Turf.

The race is named in honor of Natalma, the Virginia-bred mare who was the dam of Northern Dancer, one of the most influential sires in Thoroughbred history. Natalma is a member of the Canadian Horse Racing Hall of Fame.

Inaugurated in 1965, the Natalma Stakes was raced on dirt at a distance of 1 1/16 miles until 1968 when it was switched to the track's turf course. In 1980 the distance was modified to its present one mile.

The race was run in two divisions in 1979, 1983–1986, 1988. 1990–1995, 1997, 1998, 1999, 2001, 2002.

The Natalma was a Grade III race for many years, then became Grade II in 2012. In 2016, it became a Grade I stakes race. Several prominent fillies have competed in the Natalma, including Breeders' Cup winners Stephanie's Kitten, Dayatthespa and Catch A Glimpse.

== Records ==
Speed record:

- 1:33.70 – La Pelosa (2018)

Most wins by a jockey:

- 5 – Todd Kabel (1993, 1996, 1997, 2000, 2002)

Most wins by a trainer:

- 9 – Mark Casse (2006, 2007, 2011, 2012, 2014, 2015, 2016, 2024, 2026)

Most wins by an owner:

- 5 – Sam-Son Farm 1986, 1990 (two divisions), 1992, 2000)

== Natalma Stakes ==
Grade I

Year	Winner	Jockey	Trainer	Owner	Time
2026	Voyager	Javier Castellano	Mark E. Casse	D. J. Stable LLC	1:35.06
2025	Corsia Veloce	Fraser Aebly	Josie Carroll	Glenn Sikura and Mario Serrani	1:37.42
2024	And One More Time	Rafael Hernandez	Mark Casse	Live Oak Plantation	1:33.99
2023	She Feels Pretty	John R. Velazquez	Cherie DeVaux	Lael Stables	1:35.34
2022	Last Call	Rafael Manuel Hernandez	Kevin Attard	SF Racing LLC & X-Men Racing LLC	1:36.49
2021	Wild Beauty (GB)	Frankie Dettori	Charlie Appleby	Godolphin	1:35.08
2020	Lady Speightspeare	Emma-Jayne Wilson	Roger Attfield	Charles E. Fipke	1:34.61
2019	Abscond	Irad Ortiz Jr.	Eddie Kenneally	Apogee Bloodstock & Mike Anderson Racing	1:36.51
2018	La Pelosa	Jamie Spencer	Charlie Appleby	Godolphin	1:33.70
2017	Capla Temptress	Joel Rosario	Marco Botti	Team Valor International	1:35.12
2016	Victory to Victory	Florent Geroux	Mark E. Casse	Live Oak Plantation	1:35.24
2015	Catch a Glimpse	Florent Geroux	Mark E. Casse	Barber/Windways/et al.	1:35.95
2014	Conquest Harlanate	Patrick Husbands	Mark E. Casse	Conquest Stables	1:40.61
2013	Llanarmon	Emma-Jayne Wilson	Roger L. Attfield	Harlequin Ranches	1:35.89
2012	Spring Venture	Patrick Husbands	Mark E. Casse	Barber/Stoneway Farm	1:37.27
2011	Northern Passion	Luis Contreras	Mark E. Casse	John C. Oxley	1:35.00
2010	New Normal	Javier Castellano	Mark Frostad	Robert S Evans	1:36.51
2009	Bay to Bay	David Clark	Brian A. Lynch	Robert Smithen	1:36.06
2008	C Karma	Jono Jones	Greg De Gannes	Pamela Edel	1:40.74
2007	Clearly Foxy	Jono Jones	Mark E. Casse	Charles Laloggia	1:36.12
2006	Sprung	Emile Ramsammy	Mark E. Casse	Woodford Racing	1:35.30
2005	Arravale	David Clark	Macdonald Benson	Robert Costigan	1:35.73
2004	Fearless Flyer	Emile Ramsammy	Tommy Stack	J. Paul Reddam	1:34.99
2003	Pink Champagne	Richard Dos Ramos	John C. Kimmel	Starview Stable	1:36.53
2002	One and Twenty	Todd Kabel	Richard Violette Jr.	Klaravich Stables	1:35.03
2001	Ginger Gold	Richard Dos Ramos	Sid C. Attard	Jim Dandy Stable	1:34.66
2000	Sky Alliance	Todd Kabel	Mark Frostad	Sam-Son Farm et al.	1:34.64
1999	Mema's Turning Red	Jack Lauzon	C. Smith	C. Smith & P.A. Martin	1:35.82
1998	Dance Diane	Steven Bahen	Sid C. Attard	Pastorek/Suncrest/Attard	1:36.60
1997	Joustabout	Mike Luzzi	Richard Violette Jr.	Ralph M. Evans	1:36.40
1996	Diablo's Story	Todd Kabel	Kathy Patton-Casse	Harry T. Mangurian Jr.	1:35.80
1995	Platinum Blonde	Jerry Bailey	William I. Mott	Taylor/Grosso/Pray	1:38.20
1994	Honolulu Gold	Jack M. Lauzon	Daniel J. Vella	Frank Stronach	1:35.60
1993	Alywow	Don Seymour	Roger Attfield	Kinghaven Farms	1:39.80
1992	All An Angel	Brian Swatuk	James E. Day	Sam-Son Farm	1:45.20
1991	Morriston Belle	Richard Dos Ramos	Debbie England	Paula J. Tucker	1:37.20
1990	Dance Smartly	Sandy Hawley	James E. Day	Sam-Son Farm	1:39.40
1989	Wavering Girl	Dave Penna	Michael J. Doyle	Windhaven	1:37.40
1988	Legarto	Irwin Driedger	Macdonald Benson	Windfields Farm	1:38.20
1987	Heretic	Irwin Driedger	Macdonald Benson	Windfields Farm	1:43.80
1986	Etherial Princess	Richard Dos Ramos	John Cardella	Cinnamont Stable	1:45.00
1985	Parquill	Irwin Driedger	George M. Carter	F. & J. Cosentino	1:38.00
1984	La Lorgnette	David Clark	Macdonald Benson	Windfields Farm	1:38.80
1983	Allison's Deeds	John Bell	Emile M. Allain	Peter D. Fuller	1:42.60
1982	Bemissed	Frank Lovato Jr.	Woody Stephens	Ryehill Farm	1:40.60
1981	Proud Lou	Dan Beckon	Mort Hardy	Windhaven	1:37.60
1980	Rainbow Connection	Gary Stahlbaum	Gerry Belanger	Fleetwood / Cameron	1:37.20
1979	Par Excellance	Lloyd Duffy	Jacques Dumas	Knightsbridge/Greenberg	1:52.60
1978	Ocean's Answer	Joey Belowus	David Guitard	T. & J. Bernett	1:52.60
1977	Pottahawk	J. Burton	Edward Mann	Jim Dandy Stable	2:05.00
1976	Rumbling Roman	John Bell	Emile M. Allain	H. & S. Monk	1:45.60
1975	Chinarie	Hugo Dittfach	J. Hermens	Victura Farm	1:48.40
1974	Ruthie's Run	Hugo Dittfach	Edward Mann	Jim Dandy Stable	1:53.00
1973	Kim Sue	Richard Grubb	Robert S. Bateman	Warren Beasley	1:47.00
1972	Rome Frolic	Noel Turcotte	Carl F. Chapman	John J. Mooney	1:51.20
1971	Hildesheim	John Bell	Fred H. Loschke	M/M C. Schwabe	1:45.80
1970	Arctic Actress	Sandy Hawley	Gordon J. McCann	Windfields Farm	1:50.40
1969	Fanfreluche	Chris Rogers	Yonnie Starr	Jean-Louis Levesque	1:45.40
1968	Amber Sherry	Richard Grubb	Gil Rowntree	Stafford Farms	1:46.60
1967	Rhythm Sal	Noel Turcotte	J. Brown	I. Tenney	1:58.20
1966	Jammed Lovely	Jim Fitzsimmons	Yonnie Starr	Conn Smythe	1:48.20
1965	Ice Water	Avelino Gomez	Lou Cavalaris Jr.	Gardiner Farm	1:45.60

Note that there is no Grade II.

Grade III

Year	Winner	Jockey	Trainer	Owner	Time
2002	Fortuitous	Robert C. Landry	H. James Bond	William Clifton	1:36.94
2001	Lush Soldier	Mickey Walls	David R. Bell	John A. Franks	1:35.44
1999	Hoh Dear	Robby Albarado	Thomas Amoss	Craig & Kathy Beam	1:37.03
1998	Pico Teneriffe	Na Somsanith	Todd A. Pletcher	Eugene Melnyk	1:36.60
1997	Kirby's Song	Todd Kabel	Tino Attard	Kirby Canada Farm	1:36.60
1995	Mountain Affair	Corey Nakatani	Kathy Patton-Casse	Harry T. Mangurian Jr.	1:37.80
1994	With Care	Robin Platts	Macdonald Benson	Augustin Stable	1:35.80
1993	In My Heart	Todd Kabel	Daniel J. Vella	Frank Stronach	1:40.00
1992	Foxy Ferdie	Dave Penna	David R. Bell	John A. Franks	1:45.20
1991	Buckys Solution	Sandy Hawley	Tino Attard	Elizabeth A. Farr	1:37.20
1990	Radiant Ring	Sandy Hawley	James E. Day	Sam-Son Farm	1:38.40
1988	Miracles Happen	P. Ravera	Phil England	Richard R. Kennedy	1:39.20
1986	Ruling Angel	Dave Penna	James E. Day	Sam-Son Farm	1:45.20
1985	Sweet Saree	Dan Beckon	Rod Wright	Sherwood / Sheehan	1:38.00
1984	Bessarabian	Gary Stahlbaum	Michael J. Doyle	Eaton Hall Farm	1:38.20
1983	Baldski's Holiday	Dan Beckon	Michael J. Doyle	Eaton Hall Farm	1:42.40
1979	Flightish	Robin Platts	John Morahan	Gus Schickedanz	1:52.40

== See also ==
- List of Canadian flat horse races
