= Grey Stakes =

- Class: Grade III
- Location: Woodbine Racetrack; Toronto, Ontario, Canada
- Inaugurated: 1906
- Race type: Thoroughbred - Flat racing
- Website: www.woodbineentertainment.com/qct/default.asp

Race information
- Distance: 1 1/16 miles (8.5 furlongs)
- Surface: Dirt (Polytrack since 2006)
- Track: left-handed
- Qualification: Two-year-olds
- Weight: Allowances
- Purse: $114,045 (approx) (2015)

The Grey Stakes is a Canadian Thoroughbred horse race held annually during the first week of October at Woodbine Racetrack in Toronto. A Grade III, it is open to two-year-old horses and is raced on dirt at a distance of 1 1/16 miles. Since 2006, the dirt racing surface at Woodbine Racetrack has been the synthetic Polytrack.

Inaugurated as the Grey Stakes at the Old Woodbine Racetrack in 1906, it was named in honor of the then Governor General of Canada, Earl Grey. Over the years it has been run at various distances:

- 1 mile : 1906-1929 (Old Woodbine Racetrack)
- 1 mile 70 yards : 1930-1955 (Old Woodbine Racetrack)
- 1 1/16 miles : 1956 to present at Woodbine Racetrack

J. K. L. Ross, owner of the first United States Triple Crown Champion, Sir Barton, won this race five years in a row with future U.S. Racing Hall of Fame trainer, Henry McDaniel. In 1926 Henry McDaniel added another win, making him the leader among all winning trainers.

Notable horses who have won the race include future Canadian Horse Racing Hall of Fame inductees Horometer (1933), Kennedy Road (1970), Sunny's Halo (1982), and Sky Classic (1989). Dancer's Image won the 1967 race and went on to capture the following year's Kentucky Derby, as did Mine That Bird in 2009. Since the creation of the Breeder's Cup races in 1984, Macho Uno is the only horse to have won the Grey Stakes then gone on to win that year's Breeders' Cup Juvenile.

Famous horses who did not win the Grey Stakes include Display who ran second in 1925 but was the ensuing year's Preakness Stakes winner. As well, the 1997 Belmont Stakes winner Touch Gold finished third in the 1996 running of the Grey Stakes.

== Records ==
Time record: (at current 1 1/16 miles distance)

- 1:43.20 - Black Cash (1997)

Most wins by an owner:

- 5 - J. K. L. Ross (1921, 1922, 1923, 1924, 1925)
- 5 - Sam-Son Farm (1984, 1986, 1987, 1989, 2004)

Most wins by a jockey:

- 5 - Pat Remillard (1937, 1943, 1947, 1961, 1963)
- 5 - Dave Penna (1982, 1986, 1987, 1992, 1995)

Most wins by a trainer:

- 6 - Henry McDaniel (1921, 1922, 1923, 1924, 1925, 1926)

== Winners of the Grey Stakes since 1956 ==
| Year | Winner | Jockey | Trainer | Owner | Time |
|---|---|---|---|---|---|
| 2026 | Speaker's Speech | Rafael Manuel Hernandez | Mark E. Casse | Gold Standard Racing Stable | 1:44.55 |
| 2025 | The Big Con (GB) | Sahin Civaci | Miguel Clement | Reeves Thoroughbred Racing, Tony Weintraub and Brandon M. Dalinka | 1:46.57 |
| 2024 | He's Not Joking | Kazushi Kimura | Josie Carroll | Di Scola Boys Stable | 1:43.18 |
| 2023 | Two Ghosts | Justin Stein | Barbara J. Minshall | Hoolie Racing Stable LLC | 1:44.56 |
| 2022 | Bluebirds Over | Edgard J. Zayas | Saffie A. Joseph Jr. | Edward Seltzer & Beverly Anderson | 1:45.32 |
| 2021 | God of Love | Rafael M. Hernandez | Mark E. Casse | Eclipse Thoroughbred Partners & Gary Barber | 1:44.20 |
| 2019 | Chapalu | Patrick Husbands | Arnaud Delacour | EA Seltzer & BS Anderson | 1:44.50 |
| 2018 | Solidify | Emma-Jayne Wilson | Reade Baker | Paul Braverman & Timothy Pinch | 1:43.90 |
| 2017 | Archaggelos | Rafael M. Hernandez | Michael W. Dickinson | Monticule LLC | 1:44.56 |
| 2016 | Golden Hawk | Patrick Husbands | Mark E. Casse | Live Oak Plantation | 1:43.38 |
| 2015 | Riker | Jesse M. Campbell | Nicholas Gonzalez | Tucci Stables | 1:44.31 |
| 2014 | International Star | Rafael M. Hernandez | Michael J. Maker | Kenneth & Sarah Ramsey | 1:45.15 |
| 2013 | Ami's Holiday | Luis Contreras | Josie Carroll | Ivan Dalos | 1:44.80 |
| 2012 | River Seven | Eurico Rosa Da Silva | Nicolas Gonzalez | Tucci Stables | 1:43.98 |
| 2011 | Prospective | Luis Contreras | Mark E. Casse | John C. Oxley | 1:44.55 |
| 2010 | Blue Laser | Corey Fraser | Mark E. Casse | WinStar Farm | 1:45.78 |
| 2009 | Bear Tough Guy | Eurico Rosa da Silva | Reade Baker | Bear Stables | 1:45.34 |
| 2008 | Mine That Bird | Chantal Sutherland | David Cotey | David Cotey, D. Ball & HGHR Inc. | 1:44.45 |
| 2007 | Globetrotter | Jeremy Rose | H. Graham Motion | Earle I. Mack | 1:46.59 |
| 2006 | Skip Code | Patrick Husbands | Mark E. Casse | Charles Laloggia | 1:45.56 |
| 2005 | Unification | Robert Landry | Eoin G. Harty | Darley Stable | 1:46.50 |
| 2004 | Dance with Ravens | Todd Kabel | Mark Frostad | Sam-Son Farm | 1:47.79 |
| 2003 | Smoocher | Jim McAleney | David R. Bell | John A. Franks | 1:46.74 |
| 2002 | Wando | Richard Migliore | Michael Keogh | Gus Schickedanz | 1:45.10 |
| 2001 | Changeintheweather | Mickey Walls | David R. Bell | Pin Oak Stable | 1:47.03 |
| 2000 | Macho Uno | Jerry D. Bailey | Joe Orseno | Stronach Stable | 1:44.13 |
| 1999 | Four On The Floor | Patrick Husbands | Alexander McPherson | Lor Stables | 1:45.12 |
| 1998 | Certainly Classic | Constant Montpellier | Alexander McPherson | Dominion Bloodstock et al. | 1:46.20 |
| 1997 | Black Cash | Robert Landry | Daniel J. Vella | Frank Stronach | 1:43.20 |
| 1996 | Cash Deposit | Todd Kabel | Daniel J. Vella | Frank Stronach | 1:45.00 |
| 1995 | Gomtuu | Dave Penna | Dominic J. Polsinelli | Tri-Colour Racing Stable | 1:46.60 |
| 1994 | Talkin Man | Robert Landry | Roger Attfield | Kinghaven Farms & Helen G.Stollery | 1:46.60 |
| 1993 | Road Rush | Robert Landry | Daniel J. Vella | Frank Stronach | 1:46.00 |
| 1992 | Truth Of It All | Dave Penna | Sheldon Wolfe | A. Schmidt | 1:46.20 |
| 1991 | Steady Rise | Mickey Walls | Roger Attfield | Kinghaven Farms | 1:47.40 |
| 1990 | Wildy Special | Art Madrid, Jr. | Stephen L. DiMauro | Robert J. Sullivan | 1:46.20 |
| 1989 | Sky Classic | Sandy Hawley | James E. Day | Sam-Son Farm | 1:46.00 |
| 1988 | Mercedes Won | Lloyd Duffy | Arnold Fink | Chris Spencer | 1:45.60 |
| 1987 | Regal Classic | Dave Penna | James E. Day | Sam-Son Farm | 1:45.00 |
| 1986 | Blue Finn | Dave Penna | James E. Day | Sam-Son Farm | 1:47.40 |
| 1985 | Bishop Bob | David Clark | Arthur H. Warner | Victura Farm | 1:47.80 |
| 1984 | Dauphin Fabuleux | Jeffrey Fell | James E. Day | Sam-Son Farm | 1:45.40 |
| 1983 | Ten Gold Pots | Gary Stahlbaum | Gil Rowntree | B. K. Y. Stable | 1:45.00 |
| 1982 | Sunny's Halo | Dave Penna | David C. Cross Jr. | David J. Foster | 1:45.40 |
| 1981 | Tampa Bay Buck | Dan Beckon | Arnold Fink | John Spencer | 1:46.00 |
| 1980 | Bayford | Robin Platts | John J. Tammaro, Jr. | Kinghaven Farms | 1:44.20 |
| 1979 | Sunny Premier | Gary Stahlbaum | Frank H. Merrill, Jr. | Meadowview Stable | 1:46.20 |
| 1978 | Port Ebony | George HoSang | M. Clapperton | S. C. S. Stable | 1:44.40 |
| 1977 | Cash the Ticket | W. Woods | J. Kelly | M. Martin | 1:52.80 |
| 1976 | Do Lishus | Chris Rogers | Sheldon Wolfe | Krever Farm | 1:47.20 |
| 1975 | Bay Streak | David Clark | Gordon M. Huntley | Whittaker Stable | 1:47.40 |
| 1974 | Silverbatim | Jeffrey Fell | Gordon M. Huntley | Mutual Enterprises | 1:44.80 |
| 1973 | Trojan Bronze | Robin Platts | Glenn Magnusson | A. B. Roks | 1:46.40 |
| 1972 | Impecunious | J. Moseley | George Handy | Mrs. R. L. Feinberg | 1:44.00 |
| 1971 | Spirit Rock | Brian Swatuk | Gil Rowntree | Stafford Farms | 1:44.40 |
| 1970 | Kennedy Road | Sandy Hawley | James C. Bentley | Helen G. Stollery | 1:47.20 |
| 1969 | Dance to Market | Chris Rogers | Earl Harbourne | V. Martin Jr. | 1:52.60 |
| 1968 | Jumpin Joseph | Brian Swatuk | Robert S. Bateman | Warren Beasley | 1:46.80 |
| 1967 | Dancer's Image | Avelino Gomez | Lou Cavalaris, Jr. | Peter D. Fuller | 1:48.20 |
| 1966 | Pine Point | Avelino Gomez | Jerry C. Meyer | Willow Downs Farm | 1:45.20 |
| 1965 | Titled Hero | Avelino Gomez | Patrick MacMurchy | Peter K. Marshall | 1:47.20 |
| 1964 | Des Erables | John LeBlanc | Duncan R. Campbell | Mrs. S. Thomas | 1:48.40 |
| 1963 | Ramblin Road | Pat Remillard | Gordon M. Huntley | Gordon F. Hall | 1:45.00 |
| 1962 | Sound Stage | George Gubbins | John Passero | Stafford Farms | 1:44.20 |
| 1961 | Admiral Gano | Pat Remillard | Alfred I. Taylor | Don G. Ross | 1:45.20 |
| 1960 | Belle O McClure | John R. Adams | Harry Trotsek | Hasty House Farm | 1:45.20 |
| 1959 | Eltoro The Great | George Gubbins | John Passero | William R. Beasley | 1:50.40 |
| 1958 | Anita's Son | C. M. Clark | Arthur H. Warner | Lanson Farm | 1:48.80 |
| 1957 | Salon | Billie Fisk | J. Brown | I. Tenney | 1:47.40 |
| 1956 | Roman Artist | Eegene A. Rodriguez | John Passero | William R. Beasley | 1:45.00 |

- In 1963 Bimini Bill finished first but was disqualified and set back to second.
- In 1999 Exciting Story won but was disqualified and placed fifth.

== Earlier winners ==
- 1955 - Compactor
- 1954 - Senator Jim
- 1953 - King Maple
- 1952 - Avella
- 1951 - I'm Sandy
- 1950 - Argyle
- 1949 - Mighty Nice
- 1948 - Avona
- 1947 - Dymoke
- 1946 - Watch Wrack
- 1945 - Hyperhelio
- 1944 - Dune
- 1943 - Green Bush
- 1942 - Gallant Foe
- 1941 - Air Sure
- 1940 - Jascarf
- 1939 - Second Helping
- 1938 - Peterhof
- 1937 - Poona
- 1936 - Aldwych
- 1935 - Abbatoro
- 1934 - Brannon
- 1933 - Horometer
- 1932 - Tractable
- 1931 - Dark Mission
- 1930 - Irish Maiden
- 1929 - Sweet Sentiment
- 1928 - Butter John
- 1927 - Solace
- 1926 - Willie K.
- 1925 - Penstick
- 1924 - Caduceus
- 1923 - Turnberry
- 1922 - Prismar
- 1921 - Marble
- 1920 - Our Flag
- 1919 - No race (World War I)
- 1918 - No race (World War I)
- 1917 - No race (World War I)
- 1916 - Arravan
- 1915 - Candle
- 1914 - Lady Curzon
- 1913 - Hodge
- 1912 - Leochares
- 1911 - Aldebaran
- 1910 - Picolata
- 1909 - Penn
- 1908 - Arondack
- 1907 - Dredger
- 1906 - Glimmer

== See also ==
- Road to the Kentucky Derby
- List of Canadian flat horse races
