= Canadian Stakes =

Horse race in Toronto, Ontario, Canada

- Class: Grade II
- Location: Woodbine Racetrack; Toronto, Ontario, Canada
- Inaugurated: 1955
- Race type: Thoroughbred - Flat racing
- Website: woodbineentertainment.com

Race information
- Distance: 1 1/8 miles (9 furlongs)
- Surface: Turf
- Track: Left-handed
- Qualification: Fillies & Mares, 3-years-old & up
- Weight: Assigned
- Purse: Can$250,000 (2021)

The Canadian Stakes is a Grade II Thoroughbred horse race run annually at Woodbine Racetrack in Toronto, Ontario, Canada. Run in mid September, it is a Grade II event open to fillies and mares, three years of age and older. It is raced on turf over a distance of "about" 1 1/8 miles.

Known as the Canadian Handicap until 2006, it was inaugurated at the now defunct Greenwood Raceway in 1955 as a 1 1/16 mile race on dirt and was open to horses of either sex, aged three and older. In 1964, the event was transferred to Woodbine Racetrack where in 1970 it became a race on the grass for fillies and mares only.

In 1996, the race was run on dirt and was split into two divisions in 1982 through 1985 and again in 1989.

== Records ==
Most wins:

- 2 - Classic Stamp (2004, 2005)
- 2 - Starship Jubilee (2018, 2019)

Most wins by an owner:

- 5 - Sam-Son Farm (1989, 1991, 1998, 2014, 2020)

Most wins by a jockey:

- 5 - Robin Platts (1975, 1982, 1983, 1984, 1986)

Most wins by a trainer:

- 4 - Kevin Attard (2018, 2019, 2023, 2024)

== Winners of the Canadian Stakes ==
Year	Winner	Age	Jockey	Trainer	Owner	Time
2026	Proctor Street	4	Pietro Moran			
2025	Ready for Shirl	4	Emma-Jayne Wilson	Roger L. Attfield	Charles E. Fipke	1:49.57
2024	Full Count Felicia	5	Rafael Manuel Hernandez	Kevin Attard	Gold Square LLC	1:48.69
2023	Moira	4	Rafael Manuel Hernandez	Kevin Attard	Madaket Stables LLC, SF Racing LLC and X-Men Racing	1:46.04
2022	Fev Rover (IRE)	4	Patrick Husbands	Mark E. Casse	Tracy Farmer	1:47.33
2021	La Dragontea (GB)	4	Joel Rosario	Christophe Clement	Reeves Thoroughbred Racing and Rebecca Hillen	1:50.33
2020	Rideforthecause	4	David Moran	Gail Cox	Sam-Son Farm	1:45.00
2019	Starship Jubilee	7	Luis Contreras	Kevin Attard	Blue Heaven Farm	1:45.84
2018	Starship Jubilee	6	Luis Contreras	Kevin Attard	Kevin Attard / Soli Mehta	1:42.91
2017	Quidura (GB)	4	Junior Alvarado	H. Graham Motion	Gestuet Faehrhof	1:45.26
2016	Rainha Da Bateria	4	Julien Leparoux	Chad Brown	Lael Stables	1:46.87
2015	Strut the Course	5	Luis Contreras	Barbara J. Minshall	John Unger	1:49.56
2014	Deceptive Vision	4	Eurico Rosa Da Silva	Malcolm Pierce	Sam-Son Farm	1:47.80
2013	Minakshi (FR)	5	Luis Contreras	Michael R. Matz	Northern Bloodstock	1:44.05
2012	Barefoot Lady	4	David Moran	Richard Fahey	Mrs. H. Steel	1:45.89
2011	Never Retreat	6	Julien Leparoux	Chris Block	Team Block	1:45.13
2010	Miss Keller	4	Javier Castellano	Roger Attfield	Three Chimneys Racing	1:45.84
2009	Princess Haya	4	Rafael Bejarano	Michael R. Matz	Eileen H. Hartis	1:45.03
2008	J'ray	5	Joe Bravo	Todd Pletcher	Lawrence Goichman	1:51.86
2007	Essential Edge	4	Jono Jones	Eric Coatrieux	Chiefswood Stable	1:45.62
2006	Readys Gal	4	Ramon Dominguez	Todd Pletcher	James T. Scatuorchio	1:46.56
2005	Classic Stamp	5	Emma-Jayne Wilson	Darwin D. Banach	William A. Sorokolit, Sr.	1:47.25
2004	Classic Stamp	4	Patrick Husbands	Cliff Hopmans, Jr.	William A. Sorokolit, Sr.	1:43.59
2003	Inish Glora	5	Todd Kabel	Macdonald Benson	Robert J. Costigan	1:44.56
2002	Calista	4	Corey Nakatani	Christophe Clement	Gerald W. Leigh	1:45.04
2001	Diadella	4	David Clark	Malcolm Pierce	Stronach Stables	1:43.76
2000	Wild Heart Dancing	4	Jorge Chavez	Eugene Brajczewski	My Jo Lee Stable	1:45.07
1999	Anguilla	4	Pat Day	Tom Skiffington, Jr.	John & Glenn Sikura	1:46.87
1998	Skytrial	3	Robert Landry	Mark Frostad	Sam-Son Farm	1:42.80
1997	Woolloomooloo	5	Todd Kabel	David R. Bell	R. F. & J. E. Shaw	1:40.60
1996	Daylight Come	3	Constant Montpellier	Daniel J. Vella	Frank Stronach	1:44.60
1995	Bold Ruritana	5	Robert Landry	Barbara Minshall	Minshall Farms	1:39.60
1994	Alywow	3	Dave Penna	Roger Attfield	Kinghaven Farms	1:39.80
1993	Myrtle Irene	4	Sandy Hawley	David C. Brown	Don & Jane McClelland	1:42.80
1992	Red Journey	4	Ricky Griffith	Kathy Patton-Casse	Harry T. Mangurian, Jr.	1:42.20
1991	Radiant Ring	3	Sandy Hawley	James E. Day	Sam-Son Farm	1:44.80
1990	Premier Question	3	Gerry Baird	David R. Bell	John A. Franks	1:41.40
1989	Hangin On A Star	5	Sandy Hawley	James E. Day	Sam-Son Farm	1:42.80
1989	Ben De De	4	Lloyd Duffy	Robert A. Pion	Chpn Society	1:43.40
1988	Hear Music	5	Gunnar Lindberg	John Charalambous	John Charlambous	1:43.00
1987	Silent Royalty	3	Dave Penna	Sid Attard	Hadid Stable	1:44.80
1986	Bessarabian	4	Robin Platts	Michael J. Doyle	Eaton Hall Farm	1:47.20
1985	Vacumette	3	Dan Beckon	Trevor Swan	A. B. Roks/A. Titleman	1:44.60
1985	Lake Country	4	Jeffrey Fell	Donnie Walker	Prowse / McIntosh	1:43.80
1984	Dundrum Dancer	4	Robin Platts	Roger Attfield	Nemeth / Ryan	1:42.60
1984	Baldski's Holiday	3	Gary Stahlbaum	Michael J. Doyle	Eaton Hall Farm	1:42.40
1983	Regal Nan	3	Robin Platts	J. Mort Hardy	Windhaven	1:44.00
1983	County Meath	3	Dave Penna	G. Nagy	Ward C. Pitfield, Jr.	1:43.40
1982	Myrthful Mynx	5	Richard Dos Ramos	S. Wolfe	K. & D. Lee	1:49.00
1982	Turnablade	5	Robin Platts	Emile M. Allain	John Sikura, Jr.	1:49.40
1981	Noble Martha	4	David Clark	Yonnie Starr	Lakeview Stable	1:47.80
1980	La Voyageuse	5	J. Paul Souter	Yonnie Starr	Jean-Louis Levesque	1:46.80
1979	Amerigirl	4	Brian Swatuk	John Tammaro, Jr.	Kinghaven Farm	1:41.20
1978	Christy's Mount	5	Brian Swatuk	David C. Brown	D. H. Bunker	1:42.80
1977	Regal Alibi	4	John Burton	Ted Mann	J. M. B. Stable	1:46.80
1976	Momigi	4	Gary Melanson	John Morahan	Koichiro Hayata	1:42.60
1975	Victorian Queen	4	Robin Platts	Gil Robillard	Grovetree Stable	1:42.60
1974	Hildesheim	5	Hugo Dittfach	W. Moorhead	M/M Carl H. Schwabe	1:51.80
1973	Main Pan	5	Gregg McCarron	Odie D. Clelland	Peter D. Fuller	1:44.40
1972	Belle Geste	4	Noel Turcotte	Carl F. Chapman	Mrs. W. D. Latimer	1:48.60
1971	Painted Pony	3	James Kelly	Morris Fishman	L. Erlick	1:45.00
1970	Not Too Shy	4	Brian Swatuk	Donnie Walker	Conn Smythe	1:45.60
1969	Dave The Knave	3	J. Bell	John Annesley, Jr.	Mrs. G. M. Graham	1:58.60
1968	Muzledick	3	Richard Grubb	J. Mort Hardy	Prime Racing Stable	1:57.20
1967	Pine Point	3	Avelino Gomez	Jerry C. Meyer	Willow Downs Farm	1:57.00
1966	Native Victor	4	Hugo Dittfach	Horatio Luro	Windfields Farm	1:49.00
1965	Langcrest	4	Sam McComb	Ted Mann	Sydney J. Langill	1:52.00
1964	King Gorm	5	Avelino Gomez	Alfred I. Taylor	Lanson Farm	1:50.80
1963	Hidden Treasure	6	Pat Remillard	Robert S. Bateman	William R. Beasley	1:44.80
1962	Windy Ship	5	M. N. Gonzalez	John Passero	Stafford Farms	1:44.00
1961	Winisteo	4	Sam McComb	R. Barbier	Kia Ora Farm	1:44.40
1960	Henry B. Good	6	Avelino Gomez	O. Viau	E. C. Pasquale	1:44.80
1959	Admiral's Ace	6	Clifford Potts	E. Ordorico	Stafford Farms	1:44.40
1958	Stinson's Boy	4	Alex Wick	A. Bennie	Bayfield Farm	1:45.00
1957	Mister Nick	4	Pat Remillard	W. Russell	Four L's Stable	1:44.00
1956	Dorenes Lad	4	Vic Bovine	N. Julius	Clifford Bennett	1:44.80
1955	King Maple	4	Herb Lindberg	J. Hornsby	McMacken Stable	1:46.40

== See also ==
- List of Canadian flat horse races
