= Wonder Where Stakes =

Canadian thoroughbred horse race

- Class: Restricted
- Location: Woodbine Racetrack; Toronto, Ontario, Canada
- Inaugurated: 1965
- Race type: Thoroughbred - Flat racing
- Website: woodbineentertainment.com

Race information
- Distance: 1 1/4 miles (10 furlongs)
- Surface: Turf
- Track: Left-handed
- Qualification: Three-year-old fillies
- Weight: Scale Weight
- Purse: Can$250,000 (2016)

The Wonder Where Stakes is a Canadian Thoroughbred horse race run annually since 1965 at Woodbine Racetrack in Toronto, Ontario. Held during the end of July/first week in August, it is the third leg of Canadian Triple Tiara series for Canadian-foaled three-year-old fillies.

Raced on Turf, the Wonder Where Stakes currently offers a purse of Can$250,000. Since inception in 1965, it has been contested at 1 1/4 miles (10 furlongs) except for 1994 when the distance was set at 1 1/8 miles (9 furlongs).

The race is named in honor of the champion filly, Wonder Where, Canada's 1959 Horse of the Year and a Canadian Horse Racing Hall of Fame inductee.

In 2007, Sealy Hill became the first filly to win the Canadian Triple Tiara since the series was created in 1999.

== Records ==
Speed record: (Through 1998, Woodbine times were recorded in fifths of a second. Since 1999 they are in hundredths of a second)

- 1:58.88 - Inflexibility (2017)

Most wins by an owner:

- 7 - Sam-Son Farm (1972, 1985, 1990, 1991, 1996, 2000, 2013)

Most wins by a jockey:

- 4 - Todd Kabel (1993, 1994, 1998, 2002)
- 5 - Patrick Husbands (2007, 2009, 2011, 2014, 2015)

Most wins by a trainer:

- 4 - James E. Day (1985, 1990, 1991, 1996)
- 4 - Roger Attfield (1986, 1988, 1999, 2001)
- 4 - Mark Casse (2007, 2009, 2014, 2015)

== Winners ==
| Year | Winner | Jockey | Trainer | Owner | Time |
|---|---|---|---|---|---|
| 2024 | Hurricane Clair | Sahin Civaci | Martin Drexler | | 2:01.14 |
| 2023 | Tito's Calling | Sahin Civaci | Mike De Paulo | | 2:04.06 |
| 2022 | Sister Seagull | Antonio Gallardo | Catherine Day-Phillips | | 2:04.65 |
| 2021 | Munnyfor Ro | Justin Stein | Kevin Attard | Raroma Stable | 2:05.36 |
| 2020 | Merveilleux | Rafael Hernandez | Kevin Attard | | 2:05.34 |
| 2019 | Desert Ride | Steven Bahen | Neil J. Howard | Sam-Son Farm | 2:02.01 |
| 2018 | Avies Mineshaft | Gary Boulanger | Josie Carroll | | 2:03.67 |
| 2017 | Inflexibility | Luis Contreras | Chad C. Brown | Klaravich Stables | 1:58.88 |
| 2016 | Caren | Jesse M. Campbell | Michael P. De Paulo | Robert Marzilli | 2:03.10 |
| 2015 | Season Ticket | Patrick Husbands | Mark E. Casse | Gary Barber | 2:03.01 |
| 2014 | Lexie Lou | Patrick Husbands | Mark E. Casse | Gary Barber | 2:00.90 |
| 2013 | Smartyfly | Eurico Rosa da Silva | Malcolm Pierce | Sam-Son Farms | 2:03.27 |
| 2012 | Awesome Fire | Chantal Sutherland | Nick Gonzalez | Urban Fire Corp | 2:04.12 |
| 2011 | Marketing Mix | Patrick Husbands | Tom Proctor | Glen Hill Farm | 2:01.21 |
| 2010 | Free Fee Lady | Emma-Jayne Wilson | Reade Baker | Harlequin Ranches | 2:03.40 |
| 2009 | Tasty Temptation | Patrick Husbands | Mark E. Casse | Woodford Racing | 2:10.81 |
| 2008 | Northern Kraze | Chantal Sutherland | Mark Frostad | Frostad/Anderson Farms | 2:06.78 |
| 2007 | Sealy Hill | Patrick Husbands | Mark E. Casse | Melynk Racing | 2:02.17 |
| 2006 | Like a Gem | David Clark | Daniel J. Vella | Garland Williamson | 2:05.61 |
| 2005 | Silver Highlight | Martin Dwyer | Andrew Balding | D.H. Calson & C.D. Miller | 2:03.69 |
| 2004 | My Vintage Port | Jono Jones | Ken Parsley | K. Parsley & R. Pettifer | 2:05.08 |
| 2003 | Alpha Saphire | Emile Ramsammy | Malcolm Pierce | Stronach Stable | 2:06.59 |
| 2002 | Hot Talent | Todd Kabel | Malcolm Pierce | Stronach Stable | 2:02.27 |
| 2001 | Sweetest Thing | James McAleney | Roger Attfield | Canino, Werner & Attfield | 2:06.08 |
| 2000 | Misty Mission | Slade Callaghan | Mark Frostad | Sam-Son Farm | 2:03.30 |
| 1999 | Free Vacation | Laurie Gulas | Roger Attfield | M. & P. Canino et al. | 2:08.78 |
| 1998 | Kirby's Song | Todd Kabel | Tino Attard | Kirby Canada Farm | 2:03.80 |
| 1997 | One Emotion | Mickey Walls | Barbara Minshall | Minshall Farms | 2:05.60 |
| 1996 | Colorful Vices | Emile Ramsammy | James E. Day | Sam-Son Farm | 2:07.80 |
| 1995 | Sylky Market | Emile Ramsammy | Ann Kuti | T. Molony | 2:03.40 |
| 1994 | Mysteriously | Todd Kabel | Daniel J. Vella | Frank Stronach | 1:47.40 |
| 1993 | Strong And Steady | Todd Kabel | Daniel J. Vella | John G. Sikura & partner | 2:01.20 |
| 1992 | Bally Vaughn | Dave Penna | David Guitard | Kings Lane Farm | 2:05.60 |
| 1991 | Quiet Cleo | James McKnight | James E. Day | Sam-Son Farm | 2:04.20 |
| 1990 | Spinnakers Flying | Brian Swatuk | James E. Day | Sam-Son Farm | 2:02.80 |
| 1989 | Princess Caveat | Ray Sabourin | John A. Ross | Aubrey W. Minshall | 2:03.00 |
| 1988 | Sparrow Lake | Don Seymour | Roger Attfield | Kinghaven Farms | 2:03.60 |
| 1987 | Misty Magic | Richard Dos Ramos | Albert Trudell | J. G. Wren | 2:06.40 |
| 1986 | Carotene | Richard Dos Ramos | Roger Attfield | Kinghaven Farms | 2:14.20 |
| 1985 | In My Cap | Jeffrey Fell | James E. Day | Sam-Son Farm | 2:09.40 |
| 1984 | Bounding Away | David Clark | Macdonald Benson | Windfields Farm | 2:04.20 |
| 1983 | Northern Blossom | Dan Beckon | Gil Rowntree | B. K. Y. Stable | 2:07.80 |
| 1982 | Pensioner | George HoSang | Emile Allain | Helen G. Stollery | 2:14.60 |
| 1981 | Rainbow Connection | Gary Stahlbaum | Gerry Belanger | Fleetwood/Cameron | 2:06.80 |
| 1980 | Leading Witness | J. Paul Souter | Glenn Mangusson | H. & L. Hindmarsh | 2:08.00 |
| 1979 | Glorious Song | John LeBlanc | Yonnie Starr | Frank Stronach | 2:11.00 |
| 1978 | No Politics | Larry Attard | Peter DiPasquale | H. K. Stable | 2:14.40 |
| 1977 | Wasaga | Brian Swatuk | Gil Rowntree | Stafford Farms | 2:25.40 |
| 1976 | Sharp Sherry | Robin Platts | Gil Rowntree | Stafford Farms | 2:10.20 |
| 1975 | Momigi | Gary Melanson | John Morahan | Koichiro Hayata | 2:03.80 |
| 1974 | Lost Majorette | Lloyd Duffy | Jerry Lavigne | T. A. Morton | 2:06.20 |
| 1973 | Musketeer Miss | Robin Platts | Pat Remillard | Hedley McDougald | 2:07.40 |
| 1972 | Takaring | Avelino Gomez | Arthur H. Warner | Sam-Son Farm | 2:04.40 |
| 1971 | Painted Pony | James Kelly | Morris Fishman | L. Erlick | 2:01.60 |
| 1970 | Mary of Scotland | Sandy Hawley | Lou Cavalaris, Jr. | Gardiner Farm | 2:10.00 |
| 1969 | Not Too Shy | Avelino Gomez | Donnie Walker | Conn Smythe | 2:04.60 |
| 1968 | Golden Garter | Fernando Toro | George S. Nemett | Bill Beasley | 2:06.00 |
| 1967 | Speedy Sonnet | Hugo Dittfach | Arrthur H. Warner | Armstrong Bros. | 2:05.40 |
| 1966 | Ice Water | Avelino Gomez | Lou Cavalaris, Jr. | Gardiner Farm | 2:06.00 |
| 1965 | Northern Queen | Wayne Harris | Horatio Luro | Windfields Farm | 2:09.20 |

* In 1973, Square Angel finished first but was disqualified and set back to second.
