= Dance Smartly Stakes =

- Class: Grade II
- Location: Woodbine Racetrack; Toronto, Ontario, Canada
- Inaugurated: 1986 (as Woodbine Handicap)
- Race type: Thoroughbred – Flat racing
- Website: Woodbine Racetrack

Race information
- Distance: 1 1/16 miles (8.5 furlongs)
- Surface: Turf
- Track: Left-handed
- Qualification: Three-year-olds & Up
- Weight: Weight for Age with allowances
- Purse: $200,000 (2023)

The Dance Smartly Stakes is a thoroughbred horse race run annually in August at Woodbine Racetrack in Toronto, Ontario, Canada. A Grade II stakes race raced on turf, it is open to fillies and mares three years of age and older and run at 1 1/16 miles. Originally known as the Woodbine Handicap, the race was renamed in 1998 for Dance Smartly, the second filly to win the Canadian Triple Crown who went undefeated during the 1991 racing season and was inducted into both the Canadian and United States Racing Hall of Fames.

Inaugurated in 1986, it was raced on dirt through 1989 at a distance of 1 1/8 miles. In 1990 it was switched over to the turf course and raced that year at 1 1/16 miles after which it remained on the turf but at its original 1 1/8 miles. It was lengthened to 1 1/4 miles in 2017. In 2022 the race returned to the current distance of 1 1/16 miles.

== Records ==
Time record on turf:

- 1 1/16 miles (current distance): 1:39.46 – Wakanaka (2022)
- 1 1/8 miles: 1:44.25 – Overheard (2014)
- 1 1/4 miles: 1:59.51 – Santa Monica (2018)

Most wins:

- 2 – Radiant Ring (1991, 1992)

Most wins by an owner:

- 3 – Sam-Son Farm (1991, 1992, 1998)

Most wins by a jockey:

- 4 – Patrick Husbands (1999, 2003, 2010, 2016)

Most wins by a trainer:

- 4 – Roger Attfield (1987, 2002, 2005, 2010)

== Winners ==
Year	Winner	Age	Jockey	Trainer	Owner	Time
2026	Warming	4	Fraser Aebly	H. Graham Motion	Eclipse Thoroughbred Partners	1:43.78
2025	Breath Away (GB)	5	Sahin Civavi	Miguel Clement	Reeves Thoroughbred Racing, Steven Rocco and Marc I. Levine	1:41.74
2024	Mouffy	5	Vincent Cheminaud	Jonathan Thomas	Augustin Stables	1:42.07
2023	Miss Dracarys	5	Javier Castellano	Neil D. Drysdale	Al Shira'aa Farms	1:39.60
2022	Wakanaka	4	Rafael Manuel Hernandez	William I. Mott	Team Valor International & Gary Barber	1:39.46
2021	Mutamakina	5	Dylan Davis	Christophe Clement	Al Shira'aa Farms	2:01.26
2020	Theodora B.	5	Justin Stein	Michael Dickinson	Augustin Stable	2:02.35
2019	Holy Helena	5	Javier Castellano	James Jerkens	Stronach Stables	2:02.08
2018	Santa Monica	5	José Ortiz	Chad C. Brown	Magnier/Madaket Stables/Pearson	1:59.51
2017	Starship Jubilee (DH); Rainha Da Bateria(DH)	4; 5	Eurico Rosa Da Silva; Javier Castellano	Kevin Attard; Chad C. Brown	Kevin Attard, Soli Mehta; Leal Stable	2:01.91
2016	Lexie Lou	5	Patrick Husbands	Mark E. Casse	Gary Barber	1:44.89
2015	Strut the Course	5	Luis Contreras	Barbara J. Minshall	John Unger	1:45.41
2014	Overheard	4	Eurico Rosa Da Silva	Malcolm Pierce	Pin Oak Stable	1:44.25
2013	Solid Appeal	4	Jesse M. Campbell	Reade Baker	Jim & Susan Hill	1:46.19
2012	Marketing Mix	4	Julien Leparoux	Thomas F. Proctor	Glen Hill Farm	1:48.02
2011	Never Retreat	6	Shaun Bridgmohan	Chris Block	Team Block	1:46.48
2010	Mekong Melody	5	Patrick Husbands	Roger L. Attfield	David C. Egan	1:46.09
2009	Points of Grace	4	Luis Contreras	Malcolm Pierce	Live Oak Racing	1:45.51
2008	The Niagara Queen	5	Jim McAleney	Steve Asmussen	The Elite Racing Company	1:50.01
2007	Masseuse	5	Edgar Prado	James J. Toner	H.R.C. Elser et al.	1:45.55
2006	Ambitious Cat	5	Todd Kabel	Eric Coatrieux	Chiefswood Stable	1:49.81
2005	Noble Stella	4	Emile Ramsammy	Roger Attfield	Gary A. Tanaka	1:49.95
2004	Mona Rose	4	E. R. Da Silva	R. Earl Barnett	Paul & Frank O'Brien	1:48.18
2003	Madeira Mist	4	Patrick Husbands	Christophe Clement	Skymarc Farm	1:48.05
2002	Sweetest Thing	4	Jim McAleney	Roger Attfield	Lael Stables	1:45.72
2001	Alexis	5	Jono Jones	Cliff Hopmans Jr.	D. Morgan Firestone	1:47.81
2000	Except For Wanda	5	Jim McAleney	Bruce R. Smither	George W. Richter	1:46.61
1999	Ascot Yael	5	Patrick Husbands	John A. Ross	R.M.C. Stable	1:47.25
1998	Colorful Vices	5	Todd Kabel	Mark Frostad	Sam-Son Farm	1:46.20
1997	Woolloomooloo	5	Todd Kabel	David R. Bell	Richard & Jo Ellen Shaw	1:46.80
1996	Bold Ruritana	6	Robert Landry	Barbara Minshall	Minshall Farms	1:46.60
1995	Memories	4	Shane Sellers	Burke Kessinger Jr.	Haynes/New Phoenix Stable	1:47.20
1994	Silky Feather	4	Steven Bahen	Richard Violette Jr.	Stanton P. Powell	1:50.00
1993	Myrtle Irene	4	Sandy Hawley	David C. Brown	Don & Jane Anne McClelland	1:46.40
1992	Radiant Ring	4	Jack Lauzon	James E. Day	Sam-Son Farm	1:46.40
1991	Radiant Ring	3	Pat Day	James E. Day	Sam-Son Farm	1:46.00
1990	Fieldy	7	Eddie Maple	Thomas J. Skiffington Jr.	Fernwood Stable	1:44.80
1989	Charming Sassafras	4	Ray Sabourin	John A. Ross	Aubrey W. Minshall	1:52.00
1988	Grecian Flight	4	Craig Perret	Joseph H. Pierce Jr.	Henry C. B. Lindh	1:50.60
1987	Triple Wow	4	Don Seymour	Roger Attfield	Kinghaven Farms	1:54.00
1986	Bessarabian	4	Sandy Hawley	Michael J. Doyle	Eaton Hall Farm	1:52.00

*In 1986, Triple Wow finished first but was disqualified and placed last following a positive test for a banned medication.

== See also ==
- List of Canadian flat horse races
