= Cardinal Stakes (USA) =

Thoroughbred horse race in the United States

- Class: Listed
- Location: Churchill Downs; Louisville, Kentucky, United States
- Inaugurated: 1974 (as Kentucky Cardinal Stakes)
- Race type: Thoroughbred – Flat racing
- Website: Churchill Downs

Race information
- Distance: 1 1/8 miles
- Surface: Turf
- Track: Left-handed
- Qualification: fillies and mares, three-year-olds and older
- Weight: Base weights with allowances: 4-year-olds and up: 125 lbs. 3-year-olds: 122 lbs.
- Purse: $300,000 (2023)

The Cardinal Stakes is a Listed American thoroughbred horse race for fillies and mares three-years-old and older over a distance of one and one eighth miles on the turf held annually in November at Churchill Downs in Louisville, Kentucky. The event offers a purse of $300,000.

== History ==
The event was named after the official state bird of Kentucky, the Northern cardinal.

The event was inaugurated on 23 November 1974, as the Kentucky Cardinal Stakes as a 1 1/16 miles dirt race for three year olds and was won by veterinarian Albert F. Polk Jr's Cut the Talk, who was trained by Ohio native James E. (Jim) Morgan and ridden by Darrell Brown in a time of 1:45 1/5.

The event was run for three year olds only one more time in 1975. In the 1976 the conditions of the event were changed to fillies and mares that were three years old or older at a distance of seven furlongs as the Kentucky Cardinal Handicap. In 1982 the event was increased to 1 mile for one year and in 1983 increased again to back its inaugural running distance of 1 1/16 miles. In 1987 the event was scheduled on the turf over a distance of 1 1/16 miles with the name Cardinal Handicap. The following year the distance of the event increased to 1 1/8 miles but it was moved off the turf and onto the main track due to inclement weather.

The American Graded Stakes Committee classified the event as Grade III in 1995. The 2017 edition of the race, won by Tricky Escape, was run on dirt as the turf course was deemed unfit for racing. The race's Grade III status was kept for 2017.

The event has been run in split divisions nine times, the last of which was in 1990.

The event was run as a handicap prior to 2019.

The event was not run in 2020 and 2021.

In 2025 the event was downgraded by the Thoroughbred Owners and Breeders Association to Listed status.

== Records ==
Speed record:

- 1 1/8 miles: 1:47.29 – Daisy Devine (2012)
- 1 1/16 miles (dirt): 1:45.20 - Cut the Talk (1974)
- 7 furlongs (dirt): 1:24.20 - Unreality (1978), Safe Play (1981)

Margins:

- 10 lengths – Star Fortress (IRE) (2023)

Most wins:

- no horse with more than one win

Most wins by an owner:

- 3 – Helen C. Alexander (1988, 1992, 2009)

Most wins by a jockey:

- 5 – Pat Day (1983, 1987, 1990, 1994, 1995)

Most wins by a trainer:

- 6 – William I. Mott (1985, 1987, 1995, 1997, 2008, 2011)

== Winners ==
Year	Winner	Age	Jockey	Trainer	Owner	Distance	Time	Purse	Grade	Ref
Cardinal Stakes
2025	Proctor Street	4	Tyler Gaffalione	Brendan P. Walsh	Patricia L. Moseley	1 1/8 miles	1:49.65	$289,665	Listed	
2024	Duvet Day (IRE)	4	Flavien Prat	Michael W. McCarthy	Jane Bacharach, William DeBurgh & Richard Schatz	1 1/8 miles	1:48.79	$265,000	III	
2023	Star Fortress (IRE)	4	Luis Saez	Cherie DeVaux	John D. Gunther & Eurowest Bloodstock Services	1 1/8 miles	1:51.10	$267,500	III	
2022	Dalika (GER)	6	Brian Hernandez Jr.	Albert Stall Jr.	Bal Mar Equine	1 1/8 miles	1:50.61	$268,500	III	
2020–2021		Race not held								
2019	Kallio	4	Tyler Gaffalione	Brendan P. Walsh	Madaket Stables, Tim & Anna Cambron, Bradley Thoroughbreds	1 1/8 miles	1:55.07	$175,000	III	
Cardinal Handicap
2018	English Affair	5	Corey J. Lanerie	George R. Arnold II	Calumet Farm	1 1/8 miles	1:50.41	$100,000	III	
2017	Tricky Escape	4	Christopher P. DeCarlo	Lynn A. Ashby	Jon A. Marshall	1 1/8 miles	1:53.85	$100,000	III	Off turf
2016	Cash Control	5	Shaun Bridgmohan	Brad H. Cox	Richard & Bertram Klein	1 1/8 miles	1:49.39	$100,000	III	
2015	Button Down (GB)	4	Paco Lopez	Josie Carroll	Greenwood Lodge Farm	1 1/8 miles	1:56.19	$100,000	III	
2014	Strike Charmer	4	Chris Landeros	David M. Carroll	Courtlandt Farms	1 1/8 miles	1:49.97	$119,700	III	
2013	Abaco	5	Rosie Napravnik	Claude R. McGaughey III	Phipps Stable	1 1/8 miles	1:50.85	$112,800	III	
2012	Daisy Devine	4	Calvin H. Borel	Andrew McKeever	James M. Miller	1 1/8 miles	1:47.29	$111,500	III	
2011	Deluxe	4	Julien R. Leparoux	William I. Mott	Juddmonte Farms	1 1/8 miles	1:50.53	$109,900	III	
2010	Askbut I Won'ttell	4	Shaun Bridgmohan	Chris M. Block	Team Block & Rich Ege	1 1/8 miles	1:50.41	$109,900	III	
2009	Acoma	4	Jesus Lopez Castanon	David M. Carroll	Helen C. Alexander & Helen K. Groves	1 1/8 miles	1:50.02	$111,700	III	
2008	Indescribable	4	Kent J. Desormeaux	William I. Mott	Courtlandt Farms	1 1/8 miles	1:55.77	$113,400	III	
2007	Criminologist	4	John R. Velazquez	Claude R. McGaughey III	Stuart S. Janney III & Phipps Stable	1 1/8 miles	1:51.06	$164,550	III	
2006	Sabellina	5	Julien R. Leparoux	Charles Simon	Jay A. Lieberman	1 1/8 miles	1:49.96	$171,750	III	
2005	Sundrop (JPN)	4	Mark Guidry	Saeed bin Suroor	Godolphin Racing	1 1/8 miles	1:50.10	$175,050	III	
2004	Aud	4	Brice Blanc	Anthony L. Reinstedler	Willmott Stables	1 1/8 miles	1:53.94	$173,550	III	
2003	Riskaverse	4	Cornelio Velasquez	Patrick J. Kelly	Fox Ridge Farm	1 1/8 miles	1:50.53	$175,200	III	
2002	Quick Tip	4	Robby Albarado	Neil J. Howard	William S. Farish III	1 1/8 miles	1:51.08	$173,100	III	
2001	Watch	4	Craig Perret	Frank L. Brothers	Claiborne Farm	1 1/8 miles	1:49.12	$169,350	III	
2000	Illiquidity	4	Jon Court	Patrick B. Byrne	Stonerside Stable	1 1/8 miles	1:49.72	$176,100	III	
1999	Pratella	4	Brian Dale Peck	Burk Kessinger Jr.	Bruce Barton & Alvin D. Haynes	1 1/8 miles	1:48.88	$171,450	III	
1998	B. A. Valentine	5	Jorge F. Chavez	Dale L. Romans	Alberta Butner	1 1/8 miles	1:48.62	$180,150	III	
1997	Colcon	4	Jerry D. Bailey	William I. Mott	Cavallix	1 1/8 miles	1:51.89	$175,650	III	
1996	† Miss Caerleona (FR)	4	Larry Melancon	Niall M. O'Callaghan	Stonerside Stable	1 1/8 miles	1:47.81	$117,500	III	
1995	Apolda	4	Pat Day	William I. Mott	Allen E. Paulson	1 1/8 miles	1:49.59	$116,200	III	
1994	Bold Ruritana (CAN)	4	Pat Day	James E. Day	Minshall Farms	1 1/8 miles	1:48.25	$117,500	Listed	
1993	River Ball (ARG)	4	James Parsley	Thomas Kurt Arnemann	Thomas & Jurgen K Arnemann	1 1/8 miles	1:55.79	$115,300	Listed	
1992	Auto Dial	4	Shane Sellers	Frank L. Brothers	Helen C. Alexander	1 1/8 miles	1:52.04	$110,000	Listed	Off turf
1991	Christiecat	4	Angel Cordero Jr.	Patrick J. Kelly	Fox Ridge Farm	1 1/8 miles	1:51.10	$115,400	Listed	
1990	Dance for Lucy	4	Dave Penna	Sheldon Wolfe	Alex Schmidt	1 1/8 miles	1:51.80	$60,425		Division 1
1990	Lady in Silver	4	Pat Day	Flint S. Schulhofer	Morven Stud	1 1/8 miles	1:51.40	$59,675		Division 2
1989	Townsend Lass	4	K. Keith Allen	Mark A. Rimer	Richard Kaster & Bruce Dresdner	1 1/8 miles	1:52.00	$88,050		
1988	Top Corsage	5	Pat Valenzuela	Jerry M. Fanning	Helen C. Alexander	1 1/8 miles	1:52.40	$56,650		Off turf
1987	Lake Champlain (IRE)	4	Pat Day	William I. Mott	Mrs. Diana Firestone	1 1/16 miles	1:46.20	$57,600		
1986	Oriental	4	K. Keith Allen	Jack Van Berg	Robert Kruger, Robert Snell & William Thimigan	1 1/16 miles	1:45.80	$47,775		
Kentucky Cardinal Stakes
1985	Mrs. Revere	4	Larry Melancon	William I. Mott	Dr. Hiram Polk & David Richardson	1 1/16 miles	1:48.20	$33,682		Division 1
1985	Mr. T.'s Tune	4	K. Keith Allen	Carl A. Nafzger	Warren Terry	1 1/16 miles	1:47.20	$34,182		Division 2
1984	Electric Fanny	3	Julio C. Espinoza	Harvey L. Vanier	GM Breeding Farms	1 1/16 miles	1:48.00	$32,725		
1983	Charge My Account	4	Pat Day	Claude R. McGaughey III	Cooper Hartley (Lessee)	1 1/16 miles	1:47.20	$29,800		
Kentucky Cardinal Handicap
1982	Betty Money	3	Bernon Sayler	Ronnie G. Warren	Russell Michael Jr.	1 mile	1:38.80	$31,988		Division 1
1982	Promising Native	3	Sam Maple	Ronnie G. Warren	Ronnie G. Warren et al.	1 mile	1:39.60	$31,112		Division 2
1981	Knights Beauty	4	Travis Wayne Hightower	Emmett N. Sylvester	William J. Forster	7 furlongs	1:24.80	$31,950		Division 1
1981	Safe Play	3	Stanley Spencer	Harvey L. Vanier	Carl Lauer & Nancy Vanier	7 furlongs	1:24.20	$29,075		Division 2
1980	Vite View	4	Don Brumfield	Michael B. Ball	Mira Ball	7 furlongs	1:24.80	$28,000		Division 1
1980	Champagne Ginny	3	Don Brumfield	Ray Metcalf	Elkcam Stable	7 furlongs	1:24.60	$27,850		Division 2
1979	Impetuous Gal (CAN)	4	Earlie Fires	Joseph M. Bollero	Edward A. Cox Jr.	7 furlongs	1:24.60	$27,850		Division 1
1979	Gap Axe	4	Don Brumfield	David Kassen	Andrew Adams	7 furlongs	1:24.80	$29,350		Division 2
1978	Love to Tell	3	Eddie Delahoussaye	James E. Morgan	James Crutcher	7 furlongs	1:24.40	$27,512		Division 1
1978	Unreality	4	Lane Suire	Ralph Irwin	Karil Vangeloff	7 furlongs	1:24.20	$27,762		Division 2
1977	Likely Exchange	3	James McKnight	Thomas H. Stevens Sr.	Mrs. Pamela Stark Humphrey	7 furlongs	1:24.80	$22,575		Division 1
1977	Famed Princess	4	Concepcion Ledezma	Harry Trotsek	Mrs. Bobby Russell & Ed Seltzer	7 furlongs	1:24.80	$22,825		Division 2
1976	Hope of Glory	4	Don Brumfield	Ted McClain	Donald McKellar	7 furlongs	1:25.00	$22,563		Division 1
1976	Vivacious Meg	4	Bobby Breen	Doug Dodson	Eagle Mountain Farm	7 furlongs	1:25.40	$22,563		Division 2
Kentucky Cardinal Stakes
1975	Visier	3	Rene Riera Jr.	Richard J. Fischer	Juliette Combs Trapp	1 1/16 miles	1:45.80	$26,500		3YO only
1974	Cut the Talk	3	Darrell Brown	James E. Morgan	Albert F. Polk Jr.	1 1/16 miles	1:45.20	$22,075		3YO only

Legend:
Dirt Turf
Notes:
† In the 1996, running Bail Out Becky was first past the post by 2 1/2 lengths but was disqualified for interference as the horse turned into the straight bumping the eventual second-place finisher Miss Caerleona. Miss Caerleona was declared the winner and Bail Out Becky placed second.

== See also ==
- List of American and Canadian Graded races
