= Bold Ruritana =

Canadian-bred Thoroughbred racehorse

- Sire: Bold Ruckus
- Grandsire: Boldnesian
- Dam: Stage Queen
- Damsire: Ruritania
- Sex: Stallion
- Foaled: 1990
- Country: Canada
- Colour: Bay
- Breeder: Minshall Farms
- Owner: Minshall Farms
- Trainer: Barbara J. Minshall
- Record: 44: 14-10-6
- Earnings: $1,140,163

Major wins
- Ontario Damsel Stakes (1993); Cardinal Handicap (1994); Victoriana Stakes (1994, 1996); Canadian Stakes (1995); Churchill Distaff Turf Mile Stakes (1995); Nassau Stakes (1995, 1996); King Edward Breeders' Cup Handicap (1995); Dance Smartly Stakes (1996)

Awards
- Canadian Champion Older Female Horse (1995); Canadian Champion Female Turf Horse (1995)

Bold Ruritana (foaled 1990 in Ontario) is a Canadian Thoroughbred Champion racehorse. She was bred and raced by Minshall Farms, the successful 350-acre (1.4 km^{2}) horse farm at Hillsburgh, Ontario owned and managed by trainer Barbara Minshall and her husband, Aubrey.

Bold Ruritana was out of Stage Queen, whose sire was Graustark and damsire was Nearctic. She was sired by Bold Ruckus, a grandson of Bold Ruler.

Conditioned for racing by Barbara Minshall, her husband only saw Bold Ruritana race a short time, dying at age sixty-three in November 1993 following complications from a stroke. Bold Ruritana raced on dirt but had become a successful turf horse by age five, winning the 1995 Sovereign Award for Champion Female Turf Horse. She raced in Canada, from a base at Toronto's Woodbine Racetrack, as well as in the United States where she won the 1994 Cardinal Handicap and 1995 Distaff Turf Mile Stakes at Churchill Downs.

In addition to her fourteen career wins, Bold Ruritana finished in the top three in several other important Canadian and American stakes races including:

- 1993 – Wonder Where Stakes – 2nd
- 1993 – Duchess Stakes – 3rd
- 1994 – Canadian Stakes – 2nd
- 1994 – Dance Smartly Stakes – 2nd
- 1994 – Nassau Stakes – 2nd
- 1994 – E. P. Taylor Stakes – 3rd
- 1995 – Dance Smartly Stakes – 2nd
- 1995 – Yellow Ribbon Stakes – 3rd
- 1996 – Canadian Stakes – 2nd
- 1996 – Churchill Distaff Turf Mile Stakes – 3rd

Retired after her 1996 racing campaign with more than $1.1 million earnings, as a broodmare Bold Ruritana had her first foal in 1998 followed by five more, the last born in 2005.
