= Momigi =

Canadian-bred Thoroughbred racehorse

- Sire: Laugh Aloud
- Grandsire: Tom Fool
- Dam: Hold Me Close
- Damsire: Native Dancer
- Sex: Filly
- Foaled: 1972
- Country: Canada
- Colour: Dark Bay/Brown
- Breeder: E. P. Taylor
- Owner: Dr. Koichiro Hayata
- Trainer: John Morahan
- Record: 44: 12-9-6
- Earnings: $282,401

Major wins
- Duchess Stakes (1975); Wonder Where Stakes (1975); Nettie Handicap (1976); Canadian Stakes (1976); Nassau Stakes (1976, 1977); Seagram Cup Handicap (1976); Niagara Handicap (1977) Canadian Classic Race wins: Breeders' Stakes (1975)

Awards
- Canadian Champion 3-Year-Old Filly (1975); Canadian Champion Older Female Horse (1976); Canadian Champion Turf Horse (1977)

Momigi (foaled 1972 in Ontario) was a Canadian three-time Champion Thoroughbred racehorse.

== Background ==
Momigi was bred by E. P. Taylor at his Windfields Farm in Oshawa, Ontario. She was sold to Japanese veterinarian Koichiro Hayata whose Hayata Farm would later breed 1996 Japanese Triple Crown winner and Horse of the Year, Narita Brian.

Trained by John Morahan, Momigi was based at Toronto's Woodbine Racetrack.

== Racing career ==
At age two, the colt's best result was a third in the Natalma Stakes then at age three she won the Duchess and Wonder Where Stakes and ended L'Enjoleur's hope's for a Canadian Triple Crown when she beat her male counterparts to win the third leg on turf, the Breeders' Stakes. Momigi's performances earned her 1975 Canadian Champion 3-Year-Old Filly honours.

In 1976, the then four-year-old Momigi earned Canadian Champion Older Female Horse honours and in 1977, at a time when there was no distinction between males and females, she was voted the Canadian Champion Turf Horse.

== Breeding record ==
Retired from racing, owner Koichiro Hayata brought Momigi to Japan to serve as a broodmare for his fledgling breeding operation.
