= Cardinal Stakes =

Cardinal Stakes may refer to:

- Cardinal Stakes (Great Britain), a flat horse race in Great Britain
- Cardinal Stakes (USA), a Thoroughbred horse race in the United States
