= Robert C. Landry =

Canadian jockey

Robert Landry
Personal information
- Born: September 18, 1962 (age 64) Toronto, Ontario, Canada
- Occupation: Jockey

Horse racing career
- Sport: Horse racing
- Career wins: 2,000+ (ongoing)

Major racing wins
- Nandi Stakes (1983, 1994, 1996); Achievement Stakes (1992, 1995, 2001); Maple Leaf Stakes (1992, 1993, 2001); Autumn Stakes (1993, 2004); Clarendon Stakes (1993, 1994, 1997, 1999); Colin Stakes (1993, 1997, 2002); Eclipse Stakes (1993, 1996, 2001, 2004); Grey Stakes (1993, 1994, 1997, 2005); Highlander Stakes (1993, 1994, 1996); Jacques Cartier Stakes (1993); Nassau Stakes (1993, 1995, 1996, 1999); Ontario Matron Stakes (1993, 1994); Coronation Futurity Stakes (1994); George C. Hendrie Handicap (1994); Col. R. S. McLaughlin Stakes (1994); Mazarine Stakes (1994, 1998, 1999); Shady Well Stakes (1994, 1996, 1999, 2002); Sir Barton Stakes (1994, 1999); Victoria Stakes (1994, 1996, 1998, 2004); Canadian Stakes (1995, 1998); King Edward Stakes (1995, 2002, 2003); Toronto Cup Stakes (1995); Victoriana Stakes (1995, 1996); Dance Smartly Stakes (1996); Duchess Stakes (1996, 1997); Nearctic Stakes (1996); Ontario Debutante Stakes (1996, 2000); Swynford Stakes (1996); Victoria Park Stakes (1996, 1998); Whimsical Stakes (1996); Fury Stakes (1997, 2000); Seaway Stakes (1997, 2005); Selene Stakes (1997, 2003); Woodbine Oaks (1997, 2000, 2003); Frost King Stakes (1998); Marine Stakes (1998, 2000); Play The King Stakes (1998); Plate Trial Stakes (1999, 2005); Vandal Stakes (1999); Atto Mile (1999); Bison City Stakes (2000); Bull Page Stakes (2000); Sam F. Davis Stakes (2000); Sky Classic Stakes (2000); Durham Cup Stakes (2001); Natalma Stakes (2002); New Providence Stakes (2005); Royal North Stakes (2005); Princess Elizabeth Stakes (2006); Bunty Lawless Stakes (2007); Delaware Oaks (2009); Alabama Stakes (2009); Summer Stakes (2009); Cotillion Handicap (2009) Canadian Classic Race wins: Prince of Wales Stakes (1998); Breeders' Stakes (1998); Queen's Plate (2004)

Racing awards
- Sovereign Award for Outstanding Jockey (1993, 1994); Avelino Gomez Memorial Award (2003); Leading jockey at Woodbine Racetrack (1994)

Significant horses
- A Fleet's Dancer, Talkin Man, Archers Bay; Bold Ruritana, Niigon, Careless Jewel, Milwaukee Brew, Quiet Resolve, Graeme Hall

Robert Charles Landry (born September 18, 1962) is a Canadian Champion jockey in thoroughbred horse racing.

Landry embarked on his career while in his teens, earning his first victory on June 21, 1981, at Fort Erie Racetrack. He went on to a stellar career as one of his country's top jockeys and in 1993 and 1994 was voted the Sovereign Award for Outstanding Jockey. In addition to numerous Graded stakes race wins, in 1998 Robert Landry won two of the three Canadian Classics. In 2004, he rode Niigon to victory in Canada's most prestigious race, the Queen's Plate.

In 2003, Landry was voted the Avelino Gomez Memorial Award, an annual honour given to a jockey in recognition of their significant contribution to the sport of Thoroughbred racing.

On July 1, 2009, Landry earned the 2000th win of his career at Woodbine Racetrack.

== Outside racing ==
In addition to volunteer work for various children's charities, Robert Landy has been an active supporter and a member of the board of directors of the LongRun Thoroughbred Retirement Society. The Rexdale organization is dedicated to providing aged Thoroughbred racers with a permanent adoptive home or alternative careers as pleasure horses or companion animals.

== Year-end charts ==
Chart (2000–present)	Peak position
National Earnings List for Jockeys 2000	44
National Earnings List for Jockeys 2001	67
National Earnings List for Jockeys 2002	54
National Earnings List for Jockeys 2003	52
National Earnings List for Jockeys 2004	53
National Earnings List for Jockeys 2005	90
National Earnings List for Jockeys 2008	82
National Earnings List for Jockeys 2009	66
