= Barbara J. Minshall =

Canadian racehorse trainer (born 1953)

Barbara Minshall
Personal information
- Born: November 6, 1953 (age 72) Montreal, Quebec, Canada
- Occupation: Trainer/Owner/Breeder

Horse racing career
- Sport: Horse racing
- Career wins: 317+ (ongoing)

Major racing wins
- Bold Venture Stakes (1995); Canadian Stakes (1995); Col. R. S. McLaughlin Handicap (1995, 1996); King Edward Stakes (1995, 1996); Nassau Stakes (1995, 1996); Vigil Stakes (1995,1985, 1997); Autumn Stakes (1996); Dominion Day Stakes (1996, 1998, 1999); Woodbine Breeders' Cup Handicap (1996); Eclipse Stakes (1996, 1997); Mazarine Stakes (1996); Victoria Park Stakes (1996); Victoriana Stakes (1996); Connaught Cup Stakes (1997, 1998); Gulfstream Park Handicap (1997); Jacques Cartier Stakes (1997); Wonder Where Stakes (1997); Vice Regent Stakes (2000); Frost King Stakes (2002); Deputy Minister Stakes (2003); South Ocean Stakes (2004); La Lorgnette Stakes (2005); Bison City Stakes (2009) Canadian Classic Race wins: Prince of Wales Stakes (1995, 1996)

Racing awards
- Sovereign Award for Outstanding Trainer (1996); Sovereign Award for Outstanding Breeder (1996); Sovereign Award for Outstanding Owner (1996)

Significant horses
- Bold Ruritana, Kiridashi, Mt. Sassafras, Stephanotis

Barbara J. Minshall (born November 6, 1953) is a Canadian Thoroughbred racehorse trainer and owner who has competed both in Canada and the United States. She is the widow of Canadian Horse Racing Hall of Fame inductee Aubrey W. Minshall, the successful breeder and owner of the 350-acre (1.4 km^{2}) Minshall Farms near Hillsburgh, Ontario. Following her husband's death in 1993, Barbara Minshall, having been involved in the operation of the farm, continued the business and became a licensed trainer in 1999.

Born in Montreal, Quebec, Ms. Minshall was raised around horses and as a young lady rode jumpers and qualified for the Canadian dressage team for the Summer Olympics and the Pan-American Games. In her first year as a trainer in Thoroughbred racing, Barbara Minshall became the first woman to train the winner of a Canadian Triple Crown race when the Minshall Farms colt Kiridashi won the Prince of Wales Stakes at Fort Erie Racetrack. She followed that up by being voted the 1996 Sovereign Award as Canada's outstanding trainer and her Minshall Farms won the Sovereign Award for Outstanding Breeder and Outstanding Owner.

Among her other top horses have been Mt. Sassafras, Bold Ruritana, and Stephanotis. Mt. Sassafras was the 1996 Canadian Horse of the Year and Canadian Champion Older Male Horse. On March 29, 2021, Mt. Sassafras was one of three horses named as a finalist for induction in the Canadian Horse Racing Hall of Fame in its Thoroughbred Veteran Category.
