= Mark Samuel =

Canadian equestrian

Mark Chadburn Samuel (born 1963) is a Canadian businessman and former equestrian. He is a member of the prominent Samuel family of Toronto that established Samuel, Son & Co., and his family still owns the company.

== Equestrian career ==
In 1999 Samuel was named to his first Nations' Cup team representing Canada in show jumping. In 2002 Samuel was the traveling reserve for the World Equestrian Games in Jerez, Spain and in 2003 he represented Canada at the Pan American Games in the Dominican Republic. In all competitions, he rode the Selle Français Darios V. Samuel's family owns the Thoroughbred breeding operation Sam-Son Farm, which has produced Breeders' Cup winners.

== Professional career ==
Samuel is a former director of the Ontario Equestrian Federation (OEF), the Canadian Equestrian Federation (now known as Equine Canada), co-founder of the Ontario Hunter Jumper Association (OHJA), co-founder, past chair and current committee member of Jump Canada, Chair of the Jump Canada Hall of Fame. He is the current Group IV Chair (North America) and Bureau member of the International Equestrian Federation (FEI).
