= George Gubbins =

Canadian jockey

Personal information
- Born: December 8, 1935 (age 90) Hamilton, Ontario, Canada
- Occupation: Jockey

Horse racing career
- Sport: Horse racing
- Career wins: not found

Major racing wins
- Grey Stakes (1959, 1962); Jacques Cartier Stakes (1962); Selene Stakes (1962); Connaught Cup Stakes (1963)

Racing awards
- Leading rider at Blue Bonnets Raceway (1961)

George Gubbins (born December 8, 1935, in Hamilton, Ontario) is a Canadian retired jockey. He began his professional riding career in 1953 in Toronto where he competed at Greenwood Raceway and Woodbine Racetrack until 1974, with several years missed due to accidents. In addition he competed at Fort Erie Racetrack and at Blue Bonnets Raceway in Montreal where he won a riding title in 1961. Gubbins also raced at Waterford Park in Chester, West Virginia and various other tracks in the United States.

After his retirement as a jockey, George Gubbins became a clocker in southern California. He died in 2023 in southern California.
