= Luis Contreras (jockey) =

Mexican jockey (born 1986)

Personal information
- Born: March 14, 1986 (age 40) Mexico City, Mexico
- Occupation: Jockey

Horse racing career
- Sport: Horse racing
- Career wins: 2,510 (January 6, 2025)

Major racing wins
- El Camino Real Derby (2008); Dance Smartly Stakes (2009, 2015); Bison City Stakes (2011); Nassau Stakes (2011, 2021); Highlander Stakes (2011, 2013); Natalma Stakes (2011); Dominion Day Stakes (2011, 2013); Grey Stakes (2011, 2013); Woodbine Oaks (2011, 2017); Tampa Bay Derby (2012); Ontario Fashion Stakes (2012, 2023); Canadian Stakes (2013, 2015, 2018, 2019); Hendrie Stakes (2013, 2018); Vigil Stakes (2013, 2015); Orchid Stakes (2013); Selene Stakes (2013, 2016); Carter Handicap (2014); Eclipse Stakes (2014); Sky Classic Stakes (2014); Autumn Stakes (2014); Maple Leaf Stakes (2014, 2015); Durham Cup Stakes (2014); Ontario Colleen Stakes (2014, 2019); Kennedy Road Stakes (2015); Play the King Stakes (2015); Mazarine Stakes (2015); Star Shoot Stakes (2015, 2016, 2017); Nearctic Stakes (2016, 2017, 2021); Ontario Derby (2016); Seagram Cup Stakes (2016); Northern Dancer Turf Stakes (2017, 2018); Presque Isle Downs Masters Stakes (2017); Fantasy Stakes (2017); Schuylerville Stakes (2017); Seaway Stakes (2017, 2020, 2021); Ontario Matron Stakes (2017, 2019); Commonwealth Stakes (2018); E. P. Taylor Stakes (2019); Connaught Cup Stakes (2019), 2021, 2022); Singspiel Stakes (2020); Trillium Stakes (2020, 2021); Whimsical Stakes (2021); Honeybee Stakes (2022); West Virginia Governor's Stakes (2023); Jacques Cartier Stakes (2023); Valedictory Stakes (2023) Canadian Triple Crown races won Queen's Plate (2011, 2017); Prince of Wales Stakes (2011, 2016, 2017); Breeders' Stakes (2011, 2014, 2020)

Racing awards
- Sovereign Award for Outstanding Jockey (2011, 2012)

Significant horses
- Inglorious, Pender Harbour, Starship Jubilee
- Updated on March 25, 2025

Luis Contreras (born March 14, 1986) is a Mexican thoroughbred jockey since 2006. After starting his career in Mexico, Contreras started competing in the United States and Canada during the late 2000s. For his graded stakes race career, Contreras has won forty Grade III races, twenty-two Grade II races and four Grade I races. As part of his eight Canadian Triple Crown of Thoroughbred Racing wins, Contreras won all three events during 2011. He missed another Triple Crown after finishing tenth at the 2017 Breeders' Stakes. In the Triple Crown of Thoroughbred Racing, Contreras's best results were third at the 2014 Preakness Stakes and sixth at the 2018 Kentucky Derby.

During the Canadian Triple Tiara of Thoroughbred Racing events, Contreras won the Woodbine Oaks and Bison City Stakes in 2011 and was fourth at the Wonder Where Stakes that year. After winning the Woodbine Oaks and Wonder Where Stakes in 2017, he was fifth at the Bison City Stakes that year. Contreras placed sixth at the 2011 Alabama Stakes as part of the American Triple Tiara of Thoroughbred Racing. In Breeders' Cup races, his highest finish was runner-up at the Filly and Mare Sprint event during 2017. Contreras received the Sovereign Award for Outstanding Jockey in 2011 and 2012. He has won over 2,500 races and accumulated more than $100 million in prize winnings.

== Early life ==
On March 14, 1986, Contreras was born in Mexico City, Mexico. Growing up, Contreras had hundreds of wins in Mexico after he started his jockey career as a teenager. While racing in Mexico, Contreras had two runner-ups and one top five finish in 2006.

== Racing career ==
Contreras began competing in the United States in 2007 at races held in California and New Mexico. That year, his victories at Golden Gate Fields in 2007 gave Contreras his first American race win and first stakes race win. In 2008, Contreras had his first ever graded stakes race win at the 2008 El Camino Real Derby as a Grade III race.

From 2009 to 2010, Contreras was a jockey for Steve Asmussen in Toronto while on a work permit before he was fired by Asmussen. In 2010, Contreras could work solely for non-Canadian trainers due to his permit. That year, Contreras thought about leaving Canada before he received an open work permit. Throughout his career, Contreras won at least one Grade III race consecutively between 2011 and 2023. Of his forty Grade III wins, Contreras has won the Seaway Stakes three times.

Contreras won his first of twenty-two Grade II events at the 2009 Dance Smartly Stakes. From 2011 to 2022, he was first in at least one Grade II race except for 2020. During this time period, Contreras has won the Canadian Stakes four times. As a Grade I racer, Contreras's first win was at the 2014 Carter Handicap. Contreras additionally won the Northern Dancer Turf Stakes consecutively from 2017 to 2018 and the 2019 E. P. Taylor Stakes.

=== Triple Crowns ===
At the Canadian Triple Crown of Thoroughbred Racing, Contreras was the 2011 Canadian Triple Crown winner with his wins at the Queen's Plate, Prince of Wales Stakes and Breeders' Stakes. With Inglorious and Pender Harbour, Contreras was the first jockey to use two horses to win the Canadian Triple Crown. In 2014, Contreras re-won the Breeders' Stakes after having top three finishes at the Queen's Plate and Prince of Wales. During the 2016 Triple Crown, Contreras was the winner at the Prince of Wales and the runner-up at the Queen's Plate.

In 2017, Contreras missed his second Triple Crown after he was tenth at the Breeders' Stakes following his wins at the Queen's Plate and Prince of Wales. He additionally was first at the 2020 Breeders' Stakes. In the Triple Crown of Thoroughbred Racing, Contreras was eighteenth at the 2012 Kentucky Derby and sixth at the 2018 Kentucky Derby. At the Preakness Stakes, Contreras had a third-place finish at the 2014 Preakness Stakes and was sixth during the 2018 Preakness Stakes.

=== Triple Tiaras ===
For the Canadian Triple Tiara of Thoroughbred Racing, Contreras won both the Woodbine Oaks and the Bison City Stakes in 2011. Contreras did not win the 2011 Triple Tiara after he finished fourth at the Wonder Where Stakes. In 2017, Contreras won the Woodbine Oaks and Wonder Where Stakes while coming in fifth at Bison City. At the American Triple Tiara of Thoroughbred Racing, Contreras was sixth at the 2011 Alabama Stakes.

=== Breeders' Cup ===
Competing at the 2011 Breeders' Cup, Contreras was seventh in the Juvenile Fillies race and thirteenth at the Juvenile event. He was sixth in the Juvenile event at the 2012 Breeders' Cup. In the Turf Sprint, Contreras had a fourth-place finish at the 2016 Breeders' Cup.

He was runner-up at the Filly and Mare Sprint event during the 2017 Breeders' Cup. Contreras raced in the Juvenile, Sprint and Dirt Mile during the 2018 Breeders' Cup. He was third in the Dirt Mile, eighth in the Sprint and eleventh in the Juvenile.

=== Overall performance ===
In December 2018, Contreras won his 2,000th North American race while competing at Woodbine Racetrack. During his career, Contreras has won more than 2,500 races and accumulated over $100 million in prize winnings. In Equibase rankings for North American events, he was seventh in earnings during 2011 and thirteenth in wins during 2017. Contreras also received the Sovereign Award for Outstanding Jockey in 2011 and 2012.
