= Dave Penna =

American jockey

Personal information
- Born: January 11, 1958 Auburn, New York, U.S.
- Died: January 13, 2004 (aged 46)
- Occupation: Jockey

Horse racing career
- Sport: Horse racing
- Career wins: 1,772

Major racing wins
- Thanksgiving Day Handicap (1979); George C. Hendrie Stakes (1981, 1990); Colin Stakes (1982, 1989, 1990); Coronation Futurity Stakes (1982, 1987); Grey Stakes (1982, 1986, 1987, 1992, 1995); Bull Page Stakes (1983, 1992, 1993); Canadian Stakes (1983, 1987, 1994); Princess Elizabeth Stakes (1983, 1985, 1986); Seaway Stakes (1983, 1992, 1994); Whimsical Stakes (1984, 1987, 1988, 1991, 1993, 1994); Glorious Song Stakes (1985, 1986, 1988, 1995); Connaught Cup Stakes (1985); King Edward Stakes (1986, 1987, 1989, 1990); Natalma Stakes (1986, 1989, 1992); Nearctic Stakes (1986, 1991, 1993); Summer Stakes (1986, 1987, 1994); Bison City Stakes (1987); Cup and Saucer Stakes (1987); Toronto Cup Stakes (1987); Niagara Handicap (1988, 1989); Sir Barton Stakes (1988); Victoria Park Stakes (1989, 1990, 1995); Fountain of Youth Stakes (1990); Nassau Stakes (1990); New York Derby (1990); Phoenix Breeders' Cup Stakes (1990); Jockey Club Cup Handicap (1990); Achievement Stakes (1991, 1994); Dominion Day Stakes (1991, 1995); Durham Cup Stakes (1991); Highlander Handicap (1992, 1995); Kennedy Road Stakes (1992, 1993); My Charmer Handicap (1992); Play The King Stakes (1992); Seagram Cup Stakes (1992); Wonder Where Stakes (1992); Palm Beach Stakes (1993); Swale Stakes (1993); Victoria Stakes (1993, 1995); Plate Trial Stakes (1994); Beaumont Stakes (1995); Salvator Mile Handicap (1995); Philip H. Iselin Handicap (1995) Canadian Classic Race wins: Breeders' Stakes (1987); Prince of Wales Stakes (1993)

Significant horses
- Alywow, Peteski, Rainbows For Life, Regal Classic, Ruling Angel, Sunny's Halo, Wavering Girl

David Penna (January 11, 1958 – January 13, 2004) was an American jockey in thoroughbred horse racing who competed in the United States but had his greatest successes in Canada.

Born in Auburn, New York, he began his career as a professional rider in 1978 and three years later went to compete at Woodbine Racetrack in Toronto. In a career that spanned nineteen years, from 12,527 mounts he had 1,772 winners which earned purses totaling more than $39.5 million. Two of his most notable wins came in Canada's Triple Crown races.

One of the top riders in the 1980s and very popular with the Woodbine fans, Dave Penna rode primarily in Ontario at the Fort Erie Race Track in Fort Erie, and at Greenwood Raceway and Woodbine Racetrack, both in Toronto. In the 1990s, he began riding more frequently in the United States where he won important Graded stakes races at Keeneland Race Course in Kentucky and Gulfstream Park in Florida. In 1995 at Monmouth Park in New Jersey he won his last Grade I race, the Philip H. Iselin Handicap. A racing accident resulted in an injury that forced Penna to retire in 1996 and for a short time he turned to training horses at Gulfstream Park.

In 2004, Dave Penna died at age 46 in Saanich, British Columbia.
