= Todd Kabel =

Canadian jockey (1965–2021)

Personal information
- Born: December 7, 1965 McCreary, Manitoba, Canada
- Died: March 27, 2021 (aged 55)
- Occupation: Jockey

Horse racing career
- Sport: Horse racing
- Career wins: 3,306

Major racing wins
- Natalma Stakes (1993, 1996, 1997, 2000, 2002); Dominion Day Stakes (1994, 1997, 2003, 2004, 2007); Jammed Lovely Stakes (1994, 2004, 2005, 2006); Kennedy Road Stakes (1994, 1995, 1996, 1997, 2001, 2006); Nassau Stakes (1994, 1998, 2001, 2004, 2007); Nearctic Stakes (1994, 2003); Victoria Park Stakes (1994, 2000, 2001); Autumn Stakes (1995, 2002, 2005, 2006); Play The King Stakes (1995, 2003, 2004); Royal North Stakes (1995, 2003, 2004); Seagram Cup Stakes (1995, 1998, 1999); Sky Classic Stakes (1995, 2002); Grey Stakes (1996, 2004); Canadian Stakes (1997, 2003); Dance Smartly Stakes (1997, 1998, 2006); Highlander Handicap (1997, 2003, 2004, 2005); Sir Barton Stakes (1997); Monmouth Breeders' Cup Oaks (1998); Woodbine Oaks (1998, 2004); Cup and Saucer Stakes (1999, 2002); Toronto Cup Stakes (2000, 2001, 2003, 2004, 2005, 2006, 2007); E. P. Taylor Stakes (2000); King Edward Stakes (2001, 2005, 2006); Northern Dancer Breeders' Cup Turf; South Ocean Stakes (2002, 2004) (2002, 2003, 2004, 2006); Deputy Minister Stakes (2003, 2006, 2007); Nijinsky Stakes (2003, 2004); Woodbine Mile (2004); Hill 'n' Dale Stakes (2004, 2005, 2006); National Museum of Racing Hall of Fame Stakes (2005) Canadian Classic Race wins: Queen's Plate (1995, 2000); Prince of Wales Stakes (2000, 2007)

Racing awards
- Sovereign Award for Outstanding Apprentice Jockey (1986); Sovereign Award for Outstanding Jockey (1992, 1995, 2003, 2004, 2005, 2006)

Significant horses
- Mobil, Regal Discovery, Scatter The Gold, Sky Conqueror, Soaring Free, Strut The Stage, Woolloomooloo

Todd Kabel (December 7, 1965 – March 27, 2021) was a Canadian Thoroughbred horse racing jockey. A native of McCreary, Manitoba, he began his career as a jockey at Assiniboia Downs in Winnipeg, Manitoba, and in 1987 started competing at tracks in Ontario, moving to Toronto permanently in 1991.

Riding from a base at Woodbine Racetrack, Todd Kabel won Canada's Sovereign Award seven times, beginning with the Outstanding Apprentice Jockey in 1986 followed by Outstanding Jockey in 1992 and 1995 and during the four-year period from 2003 to 2006.

In the 1997 Breeders' Cup Juvenile at Hollywood Park Racetrack, Kabel rode 78-1 long shot Dawson's Legacy to a second-place finish behind 1997's American Horse of the Year, Favorite Trick. In 2003 he became the first Canadian-based jockey to earn more than $10 million in purse money and the following year he equalled the Hall of Fame jockey Avelino Gomez's record of 36 graded stakes race wins in a single season.

Among Kabel's major wins he rode Regal Discovery to victory in the 1995 Queen's Plate, the country's most prestigious race and that was his big break. In 2000, aboard Scatter The Gold, he earned his second victory in the Queen's Plate then won the Prince of Wales Stakes, both of which were run on dirt. However, Kabel and Scatter The Gold missed winning the Canadian Triple Crown when they finished third in the Breeders' Stakes on turf.

Todd Kabel retired from Thoroughbred racing having won 3,306 races with total purses amounting to $105,831,055.

== Year-end charts ==
| Chart (2000–2007) | Peak position |
|---|---|
| National Earnings List for Jockeys 2000 | 24 |
| National Earnings List for Jockeys 2001 | 23 |
| National Earnings List for Jockeys 2002 | 19 |
| National Earnings List for Jockeys 2003 | 9 |
| National Earnings List for Jockeys 2004 | 13 |
| National Earnings List for Jockeys 2005 | 31 |
| National Earnings List for Jockeys 2006 | 35 |
| National Earnings List for Jockeys 2007 | 58 |
