= Roger Attfield =

Canadian horse trainer and owner (born 1939)

Personal information
- Born: 28 November 1939 (age 86) Newbury, Berkshire, England
- Occupation: Trainer

Horse racing career
- Sport: Horse racing
- Career wins: 2,038

Major racing wins
- In Canada: Coronation Futurity Stakes (1975, 1994); Ontario Derby (1976, 1986, 2005, 2008); Autumn Stakes (1980, 1982, 1987); Plate Trial Stakes (1980, 1989, 1990, 1991, 1992); Vigil Stakes (1981, 1987); Jammed Lovely Stakes (1983, 1993, 2001); Canadian Stakes (1984, 1994); Bessarabian Handicap (1985, 1986, 1993); Bison City Stakes (1986, 1990, 1993; Manitoba Derby (1986, 1987); Sky Classic Stakes (1986, 1989, 2000); Woodbine Oaks Stakes (1986, 1994, 1997); Wonder Where Stakes (1986, 1988, 1999, 2001); Dance Smartly Stakes (1987); Durham Cup Stakes (1987, 1989, 1990, 2001); Canadian Derby (1987); Nassau Stakes (1987); Nearctic Stakes (1987, 1988); Achievement Stakes (1989, 1993); Princess Elizabeth Stakes (1989, 1991, 1993, 1997, 2002); Marine Stakes (1989, 1991, 1992, 1993); Woodbine Mile (1990, 1993); Connaught Cup Stakes (1990, 2001, 2007); Grey Breeders' Cup Stakes (1991, 1994); Glorious Song Stakes (1992, 1995, 2000); Dominion Day Stakes (1995, 2001); South Ocean Stakes (2001, 2019); E.P. Taylor Stakes (2011) Canadian Classic Race wins: Queen's Plate (1976, 1987, 1989, 1990, 1992, 1993, 1995, 2008); Prince of Wales Stakes (1976, 1989, 1990, 1993, 2005); Breeders' Stakes (1986, 1989, 1990, 1993, 1998, 1999, 2001) In the United States: Yellow Ribbon Stakes (1987); Pan American Handicap (1988); Carter Handicap (1993); Wood Memorial Stakes (1995); Shadwell Turf Mile Stakes (2003); Maker's Mark Mile Stakes (2004); Flower Bowl Invitational Stakes (2010) Breeders' Cup wins: Breeders' Cup Filly & Mare Turf (2011)

Racing awards
- Sovereign Award for Outstanding Trainer (1986, 1987, 1989, 1990, 1993, 2002, 2009)

Honours
- Canadian Horse Racing Hall of Fame (1999); United States Racing Hall of Fame (2011); Ontario Sports Hall of Fame (2012)

Significant horses
- Alydeed, Alywow, Carotene, Izvestia, Norcliffe, Not Bourbon, Peteski, Play The King, Perfect Shirl, Regal Discovery, Talkin Man, With Approval

Roger L. Attfield (born 28 November 1939 in Newbury, Berkshire, England) is a Canadian thoroughbred horse trainer and owner and an inductee of both the Canadian and United States horseracing Halls of Fame.

Attfield at Woodbine, June 2012

In his native England, Attfield had become an accomplished international-level equestrian competitor when he emigrated to Canada in 1970. Five years later he returned to the sport and began working as a trainer of show jumping horses and eventually was offered the chance to train thoroughbred race horses. Instant success led to training opportunities for other owners including for Frank Stronach and Kinghaven Farms where he met with his greatest success.

A resident of Nobleton, Ontario, Roger Attfield won the Sovereign Award for Outstanding Trainer a record six times. Of the seven horses who have won the Canadian Triple Crown, three were trained by Attfield. A winner of twenty Canadian Triple Crown races, he holds or equals the record for most wins in each of the three races. In 2001, he set a record for most wins by a trainer in the Breeders' Stakes and in 2005 set the record for trainers by winning his fifth Prince of Wales Stakes. At the 2008 Queen's Plate, Attfield tied the record with Harry Giddings, Jr. as a trainer with eight wins. This was his first win as an owner. Overall he has trained nearly forty Champions, six of which were voted Canadian Horse of the Year.

As the trainer for Kinghaven Farms, in 1990 his stable was the leading money winner in North America. In the United States, his horses race at Gulfstream Park in Hallandale Beach, Florida, the Fair Grounds Race Course, in New Orleans, Louisiana and at the Keeneland Race Course in Lexington, Kentucky. Attfield trained horse has won a number of important U.S. Stakes races including the 1995 Wood Memorial and Gotham Stakes.

In 1999, Roger Attfield was inducted into the Canadian Horse Racing Hall of Fame and in 2006, he was nominated for induction into the U.S. National Museum of Racing and Hall of Fame.

In 2012, Roger Attfield was inducted into the National Museum of Racing and Hall of Fame

In 2012, Roger Attfield was inducted into the Ontario Sports Hall of Fame.
