= Patrick Husbands =

Barbadian-Canadian jockey

Personal information
- Born: May 22, 1973 (age 53) Bridgetown, Barbados
- Occupation: Jockey

Horse racing career
- Sport: Horse racing
- Career wins: 3,000+ (ongoing)

Major racing wins
- Barbados Gold Cup (1990, 2006, 2010, 2014); Barbados Derby (1998); Kennedy Road Stakes (1998, 2002); Royal North Stakes (1998, 2012); Display Stakes (1999, 2002, 2005, 2010); Eclipse Stakes (1999, 2002, 2006); Grey Stakes (1999, 2006); Dance Smartly Stakes (1999, 2003, 2010, 2016); Shepperton Stakes (1999, 2000, 2003, 2004, 2012, 2016); Autumn Stakes (2000, 2003, 2008, 2010); Nandi Stakes (2000, 2002, 2003, 2014); Overskate Stakes (2000); La Lorgnette Stakes (2001, 2003, 2014); Woodbine Mile (2001); Metropolitan Handicap (2001); Seaway Stakes (2001, 2007); Nashua Stakes (2002); Swynford Stakes (2002, 2004, 2007, 2012, 2014); Cup and Saucer Stakes (2003, 2008, 2011, 2012, 2015); George C. Hendrie Stakes (2003, 2009, 2011, 2012, 2014); Canadian Stakes (2004); Charlie Barley Stakes (2004, 2006, 2012, 2016); Sir Barton Stakes (2004, 2005, 2006, 2008, 2015); Bison City Stakes (2007); Bourbonette Oaks (2007); Highlander Stakes (2007); Seagram Cup Stakes (2007, 2011, 2015); Victoria Park Stakes (2007); Wonder Where Stakes (2007, 2009, 2011, 2015); Woodbine Oaks (2007, 2014); King Edward Breeders' Cup Stakes (2008, 2010); Princess Elizabeth Stakes (2008); Connaught Cup Stakes (2009, 2010); Hendrie Stakes (2009, 2011, 2012, 2014); South Ocean Stakes (2014) Canadian Classic Race wins: King's Plate (2003, 2014, 2023); Prince of Wales Stakes (2003, 2012); Breeders' Stakes (2003, 2006, 2007, 2015)

Racing awards
- Sovereign Award for Outstanding Jockey (1999, 2000, 2001, 2002, 2007, 2008, 2009); Leading jockey at Woodbine Racetrack (1999, 2000, 2002, 2007, 2008); Avelino Gomez Memorial Award (2014)

Honours
- January 7, 2004 - "Patrick Husbands Day" in Barbados

Significant horses
- Wando, Arch Hall, Seaside Retreat, Sealy Hill

Patrick Husbands (born May 22, 1973) is a Barbadian jockey in Thoroughbred horse racing. The son of a jockey, he began riding as a young boy, turning professional in his home country where he rode successfully until emigrating to Toronto, Ontario in 1994. In 1990 he became the youngest jockey to win the prestigious Barbados Gold Cup at just 16 years, 9 months on his mount Vardar.

Racing out of Woodbine Racetrack, in 2003 Husbands won the Canadian Triple Crown aboard the colt Wando and that year became his breakout year. Among his other notable wins, he rode Numerous Times to victory in the $1 million 2001 Woodbine Mile and Exciting Story in that same year's Metropolitan Handicap at Belmont Park in New York. He rode Arch Hall to three straight wins between 2004 and 2006 in the Sir Barton Stakes. In 2007, he was the regular rider on Canadian Horse of the Year, Sealy Hill.

Patrick Husbands was voted the Sovereign Award for Outstanding Jockey a then unprecedented four straight years between 1999 and 2002. He made his first Kentucky Derby appearance in 2006 riding Seaside Retreat for trainer Mark Casse. In 2008 he won his fifth riding title at Woodbine Racetrack and was voted the Sovereign Award for Outstanding Jockey for a record-tying sixth time.

On October 4, 2009, Patrick Husbands earned his 2,000th career victory at Woodbine Racetrack.

On June 5, 2014, it was announced the Husband would be the 30th winner of the Avelino Gomez Memorial Award. The award recognizes jockeys who are Canadian-born, Canadian-raised, or a regular in the country for more than five years, who have made significant contributions to the sport of thoroughbred horse racing.

On June 18, 2016, Patrick Husbands earned his 3,000th career victory at Woodbine Racetrack.

Husbands makes his home in Brampton, Ontario. He has a brother (Simon Husbands) and a nephew- apprentice (Terry Husbands) who are also jockeys.

== Year-end charts ==
Chart (2000–present)	Peak position
National Earnings List for Jockeys 2000	14
National Earnings List for Jockeys 2001	18
National Earnings List for Jockeys 2002	14
National Earnings List for Jockeys 2003	10
National Earnings List for Jockeys 2004	24
National Earnings List for Jockeys 2005	32
National Earnings List for Jockeys 2006	26
National Earnings List for Jockeys 2007	20
National Earnings List for Jockeys 2008	16
National Earnings List for Jockeys 2009	12
National Earnings List for Jockeys 2010	11
National Earnings List for Jockeys 2011	10
National Earnings List for Jockeys 2012	15
National Earnings List for Jockeys 2013	47
National Earnings List for Jockeys 2014	15
National Earnings List for Jockeys 2015	33
