= John A. Franks =

American businessman (1925–2003)

John Franks
- Born: April 21, 1925; Haughton, Louisiana, U.S.
- Died: December 31, 2003 (aged 78); Shreveport, Louisiana, U.S.
- Education: Louisiana State University
- Occupations: Oilman; real estate investor; racehorse owner/breeder
- Spouse: Alta V.
- Children: 2
- Honors: Eclipse Award for Outstanding Owner (1983, 1984, 1993, 1994); Fair Grounds Racing Hall of Fame (1992); Louisiana Sports Hall of Fame (1995); John Franks Memorial Sales Stakes at Evangeline Downs; John Franks Memorial Stakes at Louisiana Downs; John Franks Juvenile Fillies Turf at Calder Race Course

John Franks (April 21, 1925 – December 31, 2003) was an American businessman and a Thoroughbred racehorse owner and breeder. A native of Haughton, Louisiana, he earned a degree in geology from Louisiana State University. In 1957, he founded the highly successful Franks Petroleum Inc. and later invested in real estate with Franks Realty LLC. In 1989 he sold his petroleum company to Sonat Inc.

== Thoroughbred racing ==
In 1976, Franks became involved in the horse racing business and would become a leading North American stable owner with a horse farm in Shreveport, Louisiana plus his own breeding operation in Ocala, Florida.

Franks success in Thoroughbred racing saw him become the leading owner at Louisiana Downs in Bossier City, Louisiana for eighteen consecutive years from 1982 through 1999. Nationally, he earned the American Eclipse Award for Outstanding Owner in 1983, 1984, 1993, and 1994. As at 2007, his four wins remain the most of any owner. In 1993 and 1994 he led all American owners in earnings from racing. Seven times he was the leading owner in races won, taking the title in 1983, 1984, 1986, 1987, 1988, 1989, and 1994.

Franks was the owner and/or breeder of more than a dozen horses which earned more than $1 million in their racing careers including Answer Lively, winner of the 1998 Breeders' Cup Juvenile who was voted American Champion Two-Year-Old Colt. His other horses of note included Royal Anthem, Sharp Cat, Heatherten and Kissin Kris. In poor health, in 2002 the seventy-seven-year-old Franks undertook a liquidation of his horse racing and breeding operations. He died on December 31, 2003, at the WK Pierremont Health Center in Shreveport, Louisiana. In his memory, three racetracks have named races for him.

In 1992, Franks was inducted into the Fair Grounds Racing Hall of Fame.
