= Gary Stahlbaum =

Canadian jockey

Personal information
- Born: Canada
- Occupation: Jockey

Horse racing career
- Sport: Horse racing
- Career wins: 1,759

Major racing wins
- Pennsylvania Derby (1987)

Racing awards
- Sovereign Award (1980)

Honours
- Avelino Gomez Memorial Award (2016)

Significant horses
- Afleet, Bessarabian, Rainbow Connection, Eternal Search
- Updated on February 26, 2025

Gary Stahlbaum (born in Toronto, Canada) is a retired Champion jockey in Canadian Thoroughbred horse racing.

== Career ==
He began racing in 1969, and by 1971 won 148 races in a season and in 1977 won 196 times.

He was nominated for the Canadian Horse Racing Hall of Fame in 2023.

Stahlbaum retired from racing in 1998.
