= Sandy Hawley =

Canadian jockey

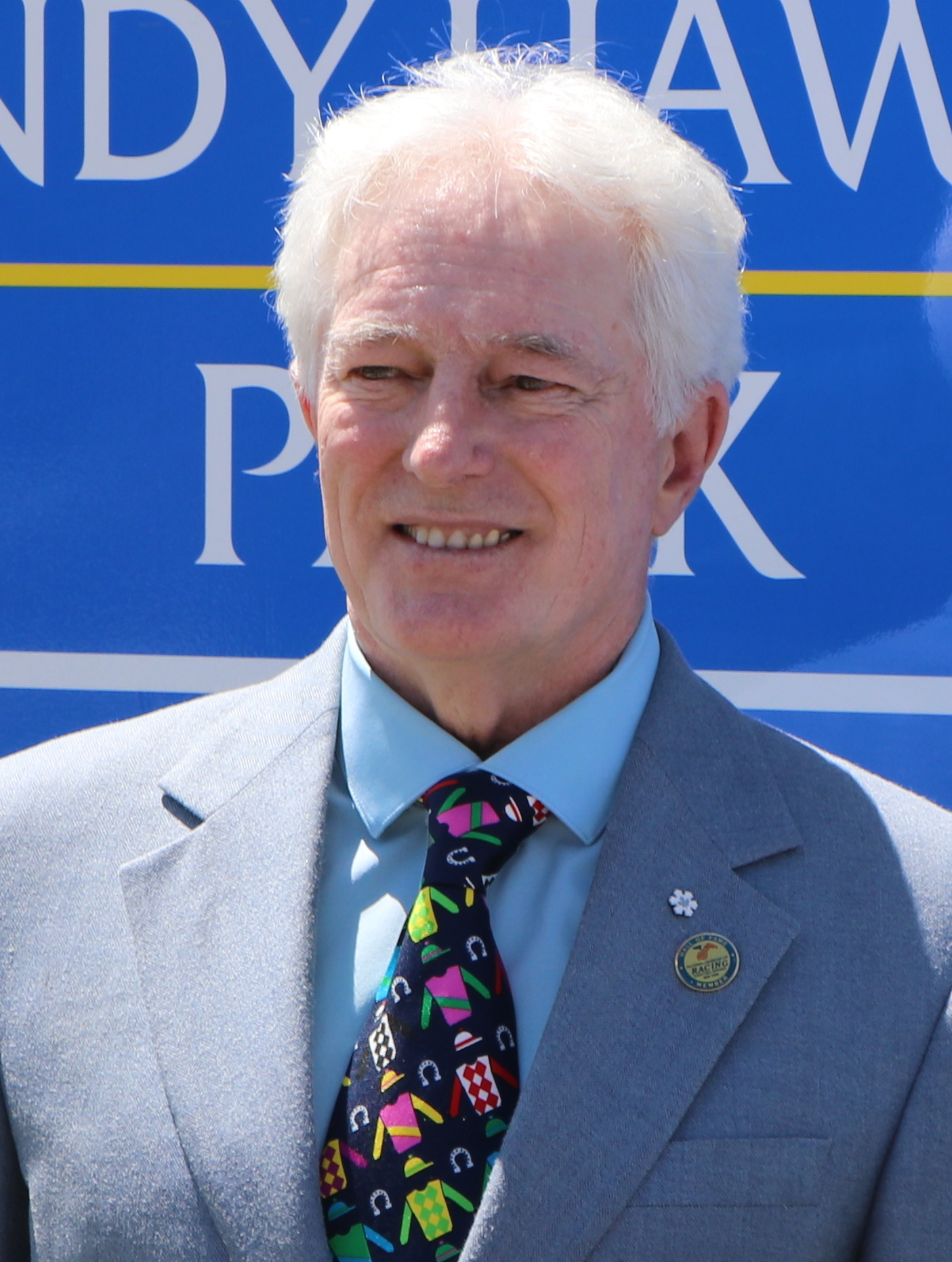
- Hawley in 2022

Personal information
- Born: April 16, 1949 (age 77) Oshawa, Ontario
- Occupation: Jockey

Horse racing career
- Sport: Horse racing
- Career wins: 6,450

Major racing wins
- Alabama Stakes (1970); Canadian Oaks (1970, 1971, 1972, 1973, 1974, 1979, 1988, 1990); Coronation Futurity (1971, 1973, 1974, 1975, 1976); Star Shoot Stakes (1971, 1972, 1974, 1989, 1996); Dominion Day Stakes (1972); Col. R.S. McLaughlin Stakes (1972, 1975, 1977, 1989, 1991); Summer Stakes (1974, 1977, 1978, 1989, 1997); Whitney Handicap (1975); Washington, D.C. International (1975, 1976); United Nations Handicap (1976); Canadian International Stakes (1976, 1979); Hawthorne Handicap (1977, 1982); Longacres Mile (1976, 1982); Hollywood Gold Cup (1981); Hollywood Futurity (1983); Bing Crosby Handicap (1979, 1980); Lane's End Breeders' Futurity (1986); Spinster Stakes (1986); Ashland Stakes (1987); Jammed Lovely Stakes (1988, 1990, 1992, 1996); Jamaica Handicap (1989); Barbados Gold Cup (1993) Canadian Triple Crown wins: Queen's Plate (1970, 1971, 1975, 1978); Prince of Wales Stakes (1970, 1975); Breeders' Stakes (1970, 1973, 1976, 1988)

Racing awards
- Leading jockey at Woodbine Racetrack (1969 through 1978, 1988 through 1990); North America's Outstanding Apprentice Jockey (1969); United States Champion Jockey by wins (1970, 1972, 1973, 1976); Canadian Champion Jockey by wins (nine times); Eclipse Award for Outstanding Jockey (1976); George Woolf Memorial Jockey Award (1976); Canada's Most Outstanding Athlete (1973, 1976); Sovereign Award for Outstanding Jockey (1978, 1988); Avelino Gomez Memorial Award (1986)

Honours
- Canadian Horse Racing Hall of Fame (1986); Canadian Horse racing's Man of the Year (1988); United States' Racing Hall of Fame (1992); Canada's Sports Hall of Fame (1998); Order of Canada (1976)

Significant horses
- L'Enjoleur, Kennedy Road, Youth; Fanfreluche, Ancient Title, Golden Act, Dahlia
- Updated on January 29, 2007

Desmond Sandford "Sandy" Hawley, CM (born April 16, 1949) is a Canadian Hall of Fame jockey.

Sandy Hawley was born in Oshawa, Ontario, decided to be a jockey when he was a 17-year-old boy, hotwalking, grooming horses at a Woodbine racetrack in Toronto Ontario. When he was 19 years old, he rode his first race at Woodbine race track as a Jockey. Then he became a regular rider at racetracks in Ontario and then rode at racetracks on the East Coast of the United States. Hawley became the first jockey to ever lead the Canadian standings in a full season as an apprentice. In 1969, a time when there were no Sovereign or Eclipse Awards for jockeys, Hawley rode 230 winners, the most that year of any apprentice jockey in North America. He went on to race in the United States where he led all jockeys in victories for the years 1970, 1972, 1973 and 1976. In the 1973 season, he became the first jockey to ever win 500 races in one year, breaking Bill Shoemaker's record. Sandy Hawley has career earnings of over $88.6 million and was one of the most successful jockeys of his generation.

Racing in California, Hawley was named the winner of Santa Anita Park's prestigious George Woolf Memorial Jockey Award. Given to a North American rider who demonstrates the highest of standards of personal and professional conduct both on and off the racetrack, Hawley has had the lifelong reputation of being a gentleman and a man of honor. In 1976 he won the Eclipse Award for Outstanding Jockey in the United States after he broke thoroughbred racing's all-time money-winning record for a single year.

As a boy growing up in Canada, Hawley developed a love for the game of ice hockey and while riding in California, he got an ice-level job as a penalty timekeeper for the home games of the Los Angeles Kings hockey team, giving himself a great view of his favorite game.

He won the Lou Marsh Trophy in 1973 and 1976 as Canada's top athlete and was named a Member of the Order of Canada, his country's highest individual civilian honor for outstanding accomplishments by a citizen.

In addition to winning many major Stakes races in the United States, four times he won Canada's most prestigious thoroughbred horse race, the Queen's Plate. Twice, Hawley won seven races in a single day at Toronto's Woodbine Racetrack and at Santa Anita Park had six wins in a single day on two occasions. Hawley and Avelino Gomez each won the Coronation Futurity Stakes a record five times. Gomez won the race four years running between 1964 and 1967. Hawley won the race five out of six years between 1971 and 1976, his streak broken by Gomez's fifth win in 1972.

Hawley's best result in the Kentucky Derby was two third-place finishes one of which was with Golden Act in 1979 aboard whom he finished second in both the Preakness and Belmont Stakes.

Overall, Sandy Hawley's career as a jockey spanned 31 years from 1968 to his retirement on July 1, 1998. He had 31,455 mounts, garnering 6,449 wins and won 18 riding titles at Woodbine Racetrack.

Diagnosed with skin cancer in 1987, doctors only gave him a few months to live but he fought to overcome the disease with experimental drugs, a careful high-fibre diet, and his sheer determination.

Sandy Hawley was voted the 1986 Avelino Gomez Memorial Award and that same year was inducted into the Canadian Horse Racing Hall of Fame. He was inducted into the United States National Museum of Racing and Hall of Fame in 1992 and Canada's Sports Hall of Fame in 1998. He was inducted into the Ontario Sports Hall of Fame in 1999.

The Sandy Hawley Award is presented every year by the Ontario Sports Hall of Fame to an individual who best exemplifies a dedication to the community.

He currently is a Public Relations Ambassador for Woodbine Entertainment Group, and resides in Toronto, Ontario with his wife Kaoru. He has worked as an analyst for The Score and CKXT-TV's horse racing coverage.

Sandy met a fellow Jockey Kaoru Tsuchiya when they were riding at Keeneland Race Track in 1987. The two were married in Lexington, Kentucky on March 10, 2019.

Sandy and his wife are working with the team of retired jockeys to help the permanently disabled Jockeys fund in many of the Community Association for Riding for the Disabled former and current volunteers.

== Living Legends Race ==
On October 18, 2008, at Santa Anita Park, Sandy Hawley and seven other U.S. Racing Hall of Fame jockeys came out of retirement for the Living Legends Race that officially counted in their career totals and was specially approved for legalized parimutuel wagering. Hawley earned his 6,450th official career victory with a win aboard Tribal Chief, a horse owned by musician/record producer Herb Alpert and his brother David Alpert.

== Selected major race wins ==
- Alabama Stakes (1970)
- Queen's Plate (1970, 1971, 1975, 1978)
- Prince of Wales Stakes (1970 & 1975)
- Whitney Handicap (1975)
- Washington, D.C. International (1975 & 1976)
- Sport Page Handicap (1976)
- Canadian International Stakes (1976 & 1979)
- Man O' War Stakes (1977)
- San Felipe Stakes (1977, 1979, 1984)
- Breeders' Stakes (1972, 1976, 1979, 1988)
- Hollywood Gold Cup (1981)
- Hollywood Futurity (1983)
- Lane's End Breeders' Futurity (1986)
- Spinster Stakes 1986
- Ashland Stakes (1987)
- Jamaica Handicap (1989)
