= Sam-Son Farm =

Thoroughbred horse racing stable

Coordinates: 43.49266°N 79.79684°W

- Company type: Horse breeding farm and Thoroughbred racing stable
- Industry: Horse racing
- Founded: 1972 (as a racing stable)
- Founder: Ernest L. Samuel
- Defunct: c. 2022
- Headquarters: Milton, Ontario, Canada
- Key people: Rick Balaz (President); Mark Samuel (CEO)
- Website: samsonfarm.com

Sam-Son Farm was a Thoroughbred horse racing stable that had farms located in Milton, Ontario (Canada) and Ocala, Florida (USA). Established in the 1960s by Ernest L. "Ernie" Samuel, it began as a home for competition hunter/jumper horses. One Sam-Son horse (Canadian Club) won the 1967 Pan-American Games Individual Jumping Gold Medal and was a member of the 1968 Team Gold Medal for Canada at the Mexico Olympics (ridden by Jim Day).

Sam-Son continued to send entries to international show jumping, dressage and three-day eventing events, including the 1972 and 1976 Olympics, and thereafter. In 1971, Sam-Son Farm became home to its first Thoroughbred race horse and officially entered racing in 1972.

Sam-Son Farm was a five-time winner of the Queen's Plate, Canada's most important horse race, and won a record seven Woodbine Oaks. In 1991, the stable won the Eclipse Award for Outstanding Owner after its horses established a new world record for race earnings.Under trainers Jim Day and then Mark Frostad (who took over in 1995), Sam-Son Farm won ten Sovereign Awards for outstanding owner and eight for outstanding breeder. The most recent trainer was Malcolm Pierce.

Following the death of Sam-Son Farm's founder in 2000, farm operations were taken over by his daughter Tammy Samuel-Balaz and lasted until her death from cancer in 2008, at age forty-seven. Management of the business was then transferred to her husband and brother, with Rick Balaz in the role of President and Mark Samuel as CEO. Ownership of Sam-Son Farm belonged to the Samuel-Balaz family, consisting of Rick Balaz, Mark Samuel, and Kim Samuel.

The business used the farm in Milton, Ontario, as a broodmare installation and maintained a training facility in Ocala, Florida. Both Ernie Samuel and Tammy Samuel-Balaz were inducted into the Canadian Horse Racing Hall of Fame, as were Sam-Son trainers Day and Frostad. Nine Sam-Son horses were inducted into the Hall of Fame, including Dance Smartly, No Class, Sky Classic, Chief Bearhart, Classy ’n Smart, Smart Strike, Wilderness Song, Dancethruthedawn and, most recently, Soaring Free in 2013.

== Notable horses ==
Sam-Son Farm owned nine horses that were voted Canadian Horse of the Year honours: Dauphin Fabuleux (1984), Imperial Choice (1985), Ruling Angel (1985), Dance Smartly (1991), Chief Bearhart (1997-'98), Quiet Resolve (2000) and Soaring Free (2004), Up With The Birds (2013).

Sam-Son Grade 1 Stakes winner, Smart Strike, went on to even greater fame as a stallion. Standing at Lane's End Farm in Versailles, Kentucky, Smart Strike was twice honoured as North America's leading Thoroughbred Sire. Smart Strike died on March 25, 2015. At that time, he was already the sire of 113 stakes winners, 12 champions, four Breeders' Cup winners, and two Classic victors.

Some of their notable Thoroughbred racehorses included:

- Chief Bearhart - won the 1997 Breeders' Cup Turf and was named the Eclipse Award for Outstanding Male Turf Horse and a two-time Canadian Horse of the Year;
- Classy 'n Smart - Canadian Champion 3-Year-Old Filly (1984), Canadian Broodmare of the Year (1991), Canadian Horse Racing Hall of Fame. Dam of Dance Smartly and Smart Strike
- Dance Smartly - undefeated in the 1991 racing season, en route to winning the Breeders' Cup Distaff, she became the only filly to ever win the Canadian Triple Crown. She won the Eclipse Award for Outstanding Three-Year-Old Filly in North America and in 2003 was inducted into the National Museum of Racing and Hall of Fame;
- Dancethruthedawn - won the 2001 Queens' Plate and the Grade 1 Go For Wand Handicap at Saratoga Race Course
- Regal Classic – Canadian Champion Two-Year-Old Colt
- Sky Classic - Canadian Champion Two-Year-Old Colt (1989), Canadian Champion Male Turf Horse, Canadian Champion Older Male Horse (1991), and the Eclipse Award in the United States for American Champion Male Turf Horse (1992)
- Smart Strike - multiple Graded stakes race winner, Leading sire in North America (2007, 2008), sire of Curlin and English Channel.
- Up With The Birds - Graded Stakes Race Grade 1 winner, 2013 Canadian Horse of the Year.
