= Jim Day =

Canadian equestrian (born 1946)

Medal record

Equestrian

Representing Canada

Olympic Games
Gold medal – first place	1968 Mexico City	Team jumping

Pan American Games
Gold medal – first place	1967 Winnipeg	Individual jumping
Bronze medal – third place	1967 Winnipeg	Team jumping

James E. Day (born July 7, 1946, in Thornhill, Ontario) was a Canadian Olympic equestrian show jumping champion and Thoroughbred horse trainer.

Day first joined the Canadian Equestrian Team in 1964, and in 1966 tied the record high jump of 7 feet 1 inch at the National Horse Show in New York. Day took gold in individual jumping at the 1967 Pan American Games. Day was named Canada's Horseman of the Year three years running in 1966 through 1968. In 1968, he was a member of Canada's gold-medal equestrian team at the Summer Olympics in Mexico City. At 22 years of age, Day was the youngest member of the show jumping team. In the 1972 Olympics in Munich he finished 4th individually, and a team 6th. In the 1976 Summer Olympics he competed in both the show jumping and three-day eventing competitions, coming in 15th individually and 5th team in the show jumping, and not finishing the three-day eventing competition, although the Canadian team came in 6th.

In 1971, Day took a job training race horses for Ernie Samuel, who had recently founded Sam-Son Farm. Day assisted in building the operation into a top Thoroughbred racing and breeding facility over the next 25 years. His training successes include two American Eclipse Awards, five Canadian Horse of the Year honors, two Queen's Plate awards, the Breeders' Cup Distaff and the Canadian Triple Crown in 1991. Day was voted Canada's top trainer on four occasions.

In 1995, Day left the employ of Sam-Son Farm and continued training for others. In 1997 he became only the third trainer to ever win Arlington Park's Mid-America Triple. His horse Honor Glide won the three races made up of the Arlington Classic Stakes in late June, the American Derby in July, and the Secretariat Stakes in August.

Jim Day was inducted into Canada's Sports Hall of Fame in 1968, the Canadian Olympic Hall of Fame in 1971, and the Canadian Horse Racing Hall of Fame in 2006.
