= Takeno Velvet =

Japanese Thoroughbred racehorse (1989–2014)

Takeno Velvet; タケノベルベット
- Breed: Thoroughbred
- Sire: Pas de Seul
- Grandsire: Mill Reef
- Dam: Takeno Dancer
- Damsire: China Rock
- Sex: Mare
- Foaled: 13 March 1989
- Died: 28 February 2014 (aged 24)
- Country: Japan
- Color: Dark bay
- Breeder: Takeoka Bokujo
- Owner: Takeoka Hisayoshi
- Racing colours
- Trainer: Minoru Kobayashi
- Jockey: Shinji Fujita
- Record: 11: 5-1-2
- Earnings: ¥228,270,000

Major wins
- Naruo Kinen (1992); Japanese Classic Tiara Race wins: Queen Elizabeth II Cup (1992)

Takeno Velvet (タケノベルベット, Hepburn: Takeno berubetto, 13 March 1989 – 28 February 2014) was a Japanese Thoroughbred racehorse who won the third leg of Japanese Triple Tiara, the 1992 Queen Elizabeth II Cup, in an upset as the 17th favourite on the day. She also showed her prowess in mixed graded race as she won in the 1992 Naruo Kinen and finished in second place behind Mejiro Palmer in the long-distance race of 1993 Hanshin Daishoten.

== Background ==
Takeno Velvet was foaled out of Takeno Dancer, which made her a half siblings to Riesengroß, the 1982 winner of Oka Sho and Martha Red, the 1983 JRA Award for Best Three-Year-Old Filly. She was sired by Pas de Seul, a British bred horse who won four races in six starts, including the 1982 Prix de la Foret.

== Racing career ==
Prior to Japan's conversion to the international age system for racehorses in 2001, they used an old system called "kazoedoshi", hence the one-year difference of horses in some races.

=== 1992: four-year-old season ===
She made her debut in February on an 1,800-metre dirt race at the Kyoto Racecourse. In this race, Hiroshi Kawachi guided her from start to finish on the lead and won by two and half lengths over Ai Paramita. She had her second starts in the Tulip Sho, a trial for the Oka Sho, the first leg of the fillies' classic. On a slightly worse track, she was hustling at the front pack for the most part and ended up in third place behind the winner, Adorable (the future Yushun Himba winner) and Nishino Flower (the future Oka Sho winner). She missed the top two priority entry for the Oka Sho and tried out for the Sweetpea Stakes (the Yushun Himba trial), in which she finished down in eight place and missed another priority entry to the second leg of the fillies classic. To increase her gained prize money, Takeno Velvet continued racing in the allowance for her next two races where she won both the Noichigo Sho and the Himeyuri Stakes by pace chasing in the early phase before getting to the front at the final bend under her jockey, Katsumi Shiomura.

These two wins allowed Takeno Velvet to participate in her first-ever graded stakes race, the Chunichi Sports Yonsai Stakes. In this race, the horse never got to settle at the front as Kyoei Bowgun led the whole way whilst she stuck in the middle pack and crossed the line in seventh place. She rested for four months before competing in the third leg of the fillies classic, the Queen Elizabeth II Cup in November. Initially, she was not qualified for the race, but at the last moment Kyowa Hoseki, the horse that finished third in the Yushun Himba, withdrew. This withdrawal allowed Takeno Velvet to enter the race as a replacement. On the race day, she entered as the 17th favourite out of 18 entry at 93.1 odds to 1. On a rather dark day, Takeno Velvet broke from gate 12 with ease and settled at the back in the early phase whilst Mejiro Kammuri, Sanei Thank You and Narita Fujihime set the pace. At the third corner, her young jockey, Shinji Fujita, who took the reins at the last minute, propelled her to the outside and drew level with the leading group. With 200 metres of race to go, Fujita cued the signal for the horse and she accelerated, overtook the leading pack and pulled away to win by three and a half lengths ahead of Mejiro Kammuri. This was the first G1 race for the young Shinji Fujita, who started his career one year prior. Fujita continued his brilliance with the horse as he rode her to another graded race win at the Naruo Kinen in December as she mingled in the middle pack before launching her final burst in the homestretch. She came home by one length ahead of the second-place finisher, Eighty Volley.

=== 1993: five-year-old season ===
In this season, she had a decent first start as she ran in eighth position before progressing positively in the final homestretch as she finished in third behind El Casa River and Nice Nature in the Nikkei Shinshun Hai. In March, Takeno Velvet joined a long distance G2 race, the Hanshin Daishoten. At the start, Mejiro Palmer, ridden by Taisei Yamada, scrambled to the lead alongside Erimo Passer and Let's Go Tarquin. Meanwhile, Yutaka Take, who was her jockey, steadied the horse down in eighth position before making his move at the third bend and accelerating towards the leading group. Entering the homestretch, Takeno Velvet closing out rapidly and overtook Nice Nature, Erimo Passer and Let's Go Tarquin but ran out of the track as she finished in second place half a length behind Mejiro Palmer, who set the race record in the process. This was still one of the best finishes by a mare in the race. This good result made her a dark horse for the Tenno Sho (Spring) in April as the fifth favourite of the day. Sadly, she did not perform well, stuck in the middle of the pack due to estrus condition and finished in tenth. She retired soon after this race as her racehorse registration was deactivated on 1 May.

== Racing form ==
Takeno Velvet won eight races and placed four times out of 11 starts. This data is available based on JBIS and netkeiba.

Date	Track	Race	Grade	Distance (Condition)	Entry	HN	Odds (Favored)	Finish	Time	Margins	Jockey	Winner (Runner-up)
1992 – four-year-old season
Feb 2	Kyoto	4yo Newcomer		1,800 m (Muddy)	9	3	2.2 (1)	1st	1:54.4	–0.4	Hiroshi Kawachi	(Ai Paramita)
Mar 15	Hanshin	Tulip Sho	OP	1,600 m (Good)	14	12	19.9 (6)	3rd	1:39.9	1.1	Hiroshi Kawachi	Adorable
Apr 26	Tokyo	Sweetpea Stakes	OP	1,800 m (Firm)	18	6	5.8 (2)	8th	1:50.0	0.6	Katsuharu Tanaka	Tai Corsage
May 24	Hanshin	Noichigo Sho (ALW)	1W	2,000 m (Firm)	12	12	2.0 (1)	1st	2:05.0	0.0	Katsumi Shiomura	(Kitashiba Lyon)
Jun 21	Chukyo	Himeyuri Stakes (ALW)	2W	2,000 m (Firm)	14	9	7.0 (3)	1st	2:01.6	–0.1	Katsumi Shiomura	(Cyclenon Groom)
Jul 5	Chukyo	Chunichi Sports Yonsai Stakes	G3	1,800 m (Firm)	14	12	4.5 (2)	7th	1:49.2	1.0	Katsumi Shiomura	Kyoei Bowgun
Nov 15	Kyoto	Queen Elizabeth II Cup	G1	2,400 m (Firm)	18	12	91.3 (17)	1st	2:27.1	–0.6	Shinji Fujita	(Mejiro Kammuri)
Dec 13	Hanshin	Naruo Kinen	G2	2,500 m (Good)	11	3	5.1 (2)	1st	2:39.1	–0.2	Shinji Fujita	(Eighty Volley)
1993 – five-year-old season
Jan 24	Kyoto	Nikkei Shinshun Hai	G2	2,200 m (Firm)	12	11	5.2 (3)	3rd	2:14.3	0.3	Shinji Fujita	El Casa River
Mar 14	Hanshin	Hanshin Daishoten	G2	3,000 m (Firm)	11	2	3.5 (2)	2nd	3:09.3	0.1	Yutaka Take	Mejiro Palmer
Apr 25	Kyoto	Tenno Sho (Spring)	G1	3,200 m (Firm)	15	6	15.4 (5)	10th	3:19.8	2.7	Hiroshi Kawachi	Rice Shower

Legend:
Turf Dirt

== Broodmare career and death ==
She returned to her birthplace in 1993, Takeoka Bokujo at Shinhidaka, Hokkaido, as a broodmare in which she foaled ten progeny until 2007. None of her progeny were outstanding, and despite much effort, she did not foal any more offspring until she was retired from breeding in 2011. She moved to the Ihatov Ocean Farm in Shiraoi, Hokkaido to spent the rest of her life. She died on 28 February 2014, at the age of 24.

== Pedigree ==
Pedigree of Takeno Velvet, dark bay mare, 1989
Sire Pas de Seul (GB) b. 1979	Mill Reef (USA) b. 1968	Never Bend	Nasrullah
Sire Pas de Seul (GB) b. 1979	Mill Reef (USA) b. 1968	Never Bend	Lalun
Sire Pas de Seul (GB) b. 1979	Mill Reef (USA) b. 1968	Milan Mill	Princequillo
Sire Pas de Seul (GB) b. 1979	Mill Reef (USA) b. 1968	Milan Mill	Virginia Water
Sire Pas de Seul (GB) b. 1979	Thereby (GB) dkb. 1965	Star Moss	Mossborough
Sire Pas de Seul (GB) b. 1979	Thereby (GB) dkb. 1965	Star Moss	Star of France
Sire Pas de Seul (GB) b. 1979	Thereby (GB) dkb. 1965	Besides	Naucide
Sire Pas de Seul (GB) b. 1979	Thereby (GB) dkb. 1965	Besides	Bees Knees
Dam Takeno Dancer (JPN) ch. 1971 F.no: 2-f	China Rock (GB) d.ch. 1953	Rockefella	Hyperion
Dam Takeno Dancer (JPN) ch. 1971 F.no: 2-f	China Rock (GB) d.ch. 1953	Rockefella	Rockfel
Dam Takeno Dancer (JPN) ch. 1971 F.no: 2-f	China Rock (GB) d.ch. 1953	May Wong	Rustom Pasha
Dam Takeno Dancer (JPN) ch. 1971 F.no: 2-f	China Rock (GB) d.ch. 1953	May Wong	Wezzan
Dam Takeno Dancer (JPN) ch. 1971 F.no: 2-f	La Danseuse (GB) b. 1964	Le Levanstell	Le Lavandou
Dam Takeno Dancer (JPN) ch. 1971 F.no: 2-f	La Danseuse (GB) b. 1964	Le Levanstell	Stella's Sister
Dam Takeno Dancer (JPN) ch. 1971 F.no: 2-f	La Danseuse (GB) b. 1964	Star Dancer	Arctic Star
Dam Takeno Dancer (JPN) ch. 1971 F.no: 2-f	La Danseuse (GB) b. 1964	Star Dancer	Dancing Time

- Takeno Velvet was an inbred of 5 x 5 x 5 to Nearco (Nasrullah's, Mossborough's, and Arctic Star's sire).
