= Adorable (horse) =

Japanese Thoroughbred racehorse (1989–2005)

Adorable アドラーブル
- Breed: Thoroughbred
- Sire: Northern Taste
- Grandsire: Northern Dancer
- Dam: Ecorche
- Damsire: Big Spruce
- Sex: Mare
- Foaled: 28 March 1989
- Died: 23 April 2005 (aged 15)
- Country: Japan
- Color: Chesnut
- Breeder: Shadai Farm
- Owner: Haruo Negishi
- Racing colours
- Trainer: Minoru Kobayashi
- Jockey: Yoshiyuki Muramoto
- Record: 9: 3-2-1
- Earnings: ¥225,459,000

Major wins
- Japanese Classic Tiara Race wins: Yushun Himba (1992)

Adorable (アドラーブル, Hepburn: Adorāburu, 28 March 1989 – 23 April 2005) was a Japanese Thoroughbred racehorse who won the second leg of Japanese Triple Tiara, the Yushun Himba, in 1992. Her total earnings were ¥225,459,000 after her racing career.

== Background ==
Adorable was foaled on March 28, 1989, at the Shadai Farm, from the mare Ecorche, a foal of Big Spruce. She was sired by Northern Taste, a leading sire in Japan for 10 consecutive years. Her grandsire, Northern Dancer, was a double crown winner of the US Triple Crown and a leading sire in many countries.

== Racing career ==
=== 1991: Three-year-old season (Note: Prior to Japan's conversion to the international age system for racehorses in 2001, they used an old system called "kazoedoshi", hence the one year difference of horses in some races.) ===
On July 13, Adorable made her debut race at the Niigata Racecourse. She was ridden by Katsumi Shiomura and finished first with an overwhelming six lengths over Union Boy. At her next race, she competed in the Sapporo Sansai Stakes, along with thirteen other horses. Although she was the second most popular, with Nishino Flower being the favorite, she had finished lower, placing 9th. After that, it was decided that she would run on a dirt race, with a different jockey this time, Mikio Matsunaga. Despite the changes, she still failed to win, only placing third.

=== 1992: Four-year-old season ===
In her second season, she returned to a turf race, the Kobai Sho. Now with a different jockey, Yoshyuki Muramoto, she had placed higher than her previous race last year, now second, just behind Kogane Tesco. She then returned to a dirt track once again, although it only made her perform worse as she placed lower than bettors anticipated, 7th among 14 runners. Afterwards, she switched to a turf race for the last time, now with the Tulip Sho, which was formerly an open race. With an odds of 14.8 (3rd favorite), she finally achieved victory against Nishino Flower by three and-a-half lengths.

At the first leg of Triple Tiara, the Oka Sho, she had lost again from Nishino Flower with the same margin as her previous race. On the Yushun Himba, she won by half a length against Sanei Thank You. She then went and lost in the Queen Elizabeth II Cup, finishing fourth, just behind Nishino Flower by three-fourth lengths.

== Racing Record ==
Adorable's racing career was quite short, spanning only from July 13, 1991, until November 15, 1992. During that time, she won three races, only one of which is a G1 race.

Date	Track	Race	Grade	Distance (Condition)	BK (PP)	Entry	Odds (Favored)	Finish	Time	Margin	Jockey	Winner (Runner-up)
1991 – three-year-old season
Jul 13	Niigata	3YO Debut		1000m (Heavy)	5 (5)	10	3.3 (2)	1st	0:57.9	-1.0	Katsumi Shiomura	(Union Boy)
Jul 28	Sapporo	Sapporo Sansai Stakes	G3	1200m (Firm)	7 (11)	14	7.4 (2)	9th	1:12.1	1.6	Katsumi Shiomura	Nishino Flower
Dec 1	Hanshin	3YO	ALW (1 Win)	1200m (Fast)	8 (12)	12	10.1 (3)	3rd	1:14.1	0.3	Mikio Matsunaga	Tai Dreamer
1992 – four-year-old season
Jan 6	Kyoto	Kobai Sho	OP	1200m (Good)	6 (11)	16	20.1 (8)	2nd	1:10.8	0.2	Yoshiyuki Muramoto	Kogane Tesco
Feb 2	Kyoto	Kanzakura Sho	ALW (1 Win)	1200m (Sloppy)	3 (3)	14	2.2 (1)	7th	1:12.5	1.3	Yoshiyuki Muramoto	Nishino Olivia
Mar 15	Hanshin	Tulip Sho	OP	1600m (Good)	8 (14)	14	14.8 (3)	1st	1:38.5	-0.6	Yoshiyuki Muramoto	(Nishino Flower)
Apr 12	Hanshin	Oka Sho	G1	1600m (Firm)	6 (11)	18	14.7 (6)	2nd	1:38.1	0.6	Yoshiyuki Muramoto	Nishino Flower
May 14	Tokyo	Yushun Himba	G1	2400m (Firm)	1 (2)	18	15.1 (4)	1st	2:28.9	-0.1	Yoshiyuki Muramoto	(Sanei Thank You)
Nov 15	Kyoto	Queen Elizabeth II Cup	G1	2400m (Firm)	4 (7)	18	12.2 (5)	4th	2:27.8	0.7	Yoshiyuki Muramoto	Takeno Velvet

Dirt

== Breeding Career and Death ==
Adorable had foaled a total of 9 horses. Her leading progeny, Emocion (horse), is the winner of 1999 Kyōto Kinen.

She later died on April 23, 2005.

== Pedigree ==
Pedigree of Adorable, chestnut mare, 28 March 1989
Sire Northern Taste ch. 1971 (CAN)	Northern Dancer b. 1961 (CAN)	Nearctic (CAN)	Nearco (ITY)
Sire Northern Taste ch. 1971 (CAN)	Northern Dancer b. 1961 (CAN)	Nearctic (CAN)	Lady Angela (GB)
Sire Northern Taste ch. 1971 (CAN)	Northern Dancer b. 1961 (CAN)	Natalma (USA)	Native Dancer (USA)
Sire Northern Taste ch. 1971 (CAN)	Northern Dancer b. 1961 (CAN)	Natalma (USA)	Almahmoud (USA)
Sire Northern Taste ch. 1971 (CAN)	Lady Victoria dk.b. 1962 (CAN)	Victoria Park (CAN)	Chop Chop (USA)
Sire Northern Taste ch. 1971 (CAN)	Lady Victoria dk.b. 1962 (CAN)	Victoria Park (CAN)	Victoriana (USA)
Sire Northern Taste ch. 1971 (CAN)	Lady Victoria dk.b. 1962 (CAN)	Lady Angela (GB)	Hyperion (GB)
Sire Northern Taste ch. 1971 (CAN)	Lady Victoria dk.b. 1962 (CAN)	Lady Angela (GB)	Sister Sarah (GB)
Dam Ecorche dk.b. 1982 (USA)	Big Spruce dk.b. 1969 (USA)	Herbager (FR)	Vandale (FR)
Dam Ecorche dk.b. 1982 (USA)	Big Spruce dk.b. 1969 (USA)	Herbager (FR)	Flagette (FR)
Dam Ecorche dk.b. 1982 (USA)	Big Spruce dk.b. 1969 (USA)	Silver Sari (USA)	Prince John (USA)
Dam Ecorche dk.b. 1982 (USA)	Big Spruce dk.b. 1969 (USA)	Silver Sari (USA)	Golder Sari (USA)
Dam Ecorche dk.b. 1982 (USA)	Idmon ch. 1975 (USA)	Dr. Fager (USA)	Rough'n Tumble (USA)
Dam Ecorche dk.b. 1982 (USA)	Idmon ch. 1975 (USA)	Dr. Fager (USA)	Aspidistra (USA)
Dam Ecorche dk.b. 1982 (USA)	Idmon ch. 1975 (USA)	Arachne (USA)	Intentionally (USA)
Dam Ecorche dk.b. 1982 (USA)	Idmon ch. 1975 (USA)	Arachne (USA)	Molecombe Peak (GB) (Family: 14-c)
