= Fiddle Dancer Boy =

Canadian-bred Thoroughbred racehorse

- Sire: Nice Dancer
- Grandsire: Northern Dancer
- Dam: Fiddly Dee
- Damsire: Hidden Treasure
- Sex: Stallion
- Foaled: 1978
- Country: Canada
- Colour: Bay
- Breeder: Warren Beasley
- Owner: John Bernard Woods Carmichael
- Trainer: James C. Bentley
- Earnings: $364,773

Major wins
- Heresy Stakes (1981); Connaught Cup Stakes (1983); Shepperton Stakes (1983) Canadian Classic Race wins: Queen's Plate (1981)

Fiddle Dancer Boy (1978–1991) was a Canadian Thoroughbred racehorse who won the 1981 Queen's Plate, Canada's most prestigious race and North America's oldest annually run stakes race. Bred by prominent Ontario owner/breeder Warren Beasley, he was sired by Nice Dancer, the 1972 Canadian Champion Three-Year-Old Male Horse. He was out of the mare Fiddly Dee, whose sire was 1961 Canadian Horse of the Year Hidden Treasure.

As a yearling, Fiddle Dancer Boy was purchased for $20,000 by Toronto car dealer Jack Carmichael and his brother Donald on the recommendation of future Hall of Fame trainer Jim Bentley.

== 1981 Queen's Plate ==
Sent off by the betting public at 8-to-1 odds in the Queen's Plate, Fiddle Dancer Boy defeated the heavily favored Frost King to win the race. The horse's success led to owner Jack Carmichael eventually buying the Huntington Stud Farm in Kleinburg, Ontario following the retirement of owner Bill Sills.

Although Fiddle Dancer Boy suffered from foot ailments, he raced successfully for another two years, retiring at age five to stand at stud. From a limited number of offspring, he notably sired Complete Endeavor, who won fourteen career races including five in a row in 1990.

Fiddle Dancer Boy died of colic at age thirteen on November 11, 1991.

== Pedigree ==
Pedigree of Fiddle Dancer Boy, bay stallion, 1978
Sire Nice Dancer	Northern Dancer	Nearctic	Nearco
Sire Nice Dancer	Northern Dancer	Nearctic	Lady Angela
Sire Nice Dancer	Northern Dancer	Natalma	Native Dancer
Sire Nice Dancer	Northern Dancer	Natalma	Almahmoud
Sire Nice Dancer	Nice Princess	Le Beau Prince	Fontenay
Sire Nice Dancer	Nice Princess	Le Beau Prince	Quillerie
Sire Nice Dancer	Nice Princess	Happy Night	Alizier
Sire Nice Dancer	Nice Princess	Happy Night	Happy Grace
Dam Fiddly Dee	Hidden Treasure	Dark Star	Royal Gem
Dam Fiddly Dee	Hidden Treasure	Dark Star	Isolde
Dam Fiddly Dee	Hidden Treasure	Ratine	Bahram
Dam Fiddly Dee	Hidden Treasure	Ratine	Monel
Dam Fiddly Dee	Stormy Cruise	Third Degree	Questionnaire
Dam Fiddly Dee	Stormy Cruise	Third Degree	Panache
Dam Fiddly Dee	Stormy Cruise	Pinnace	Roman
Dam Fiddly Dee	Stormy Cruise	Pinnace	Boat
