= Naruo Kinen =

Japanese thoroughbred race

Naruo Kinen 鳴尾記念
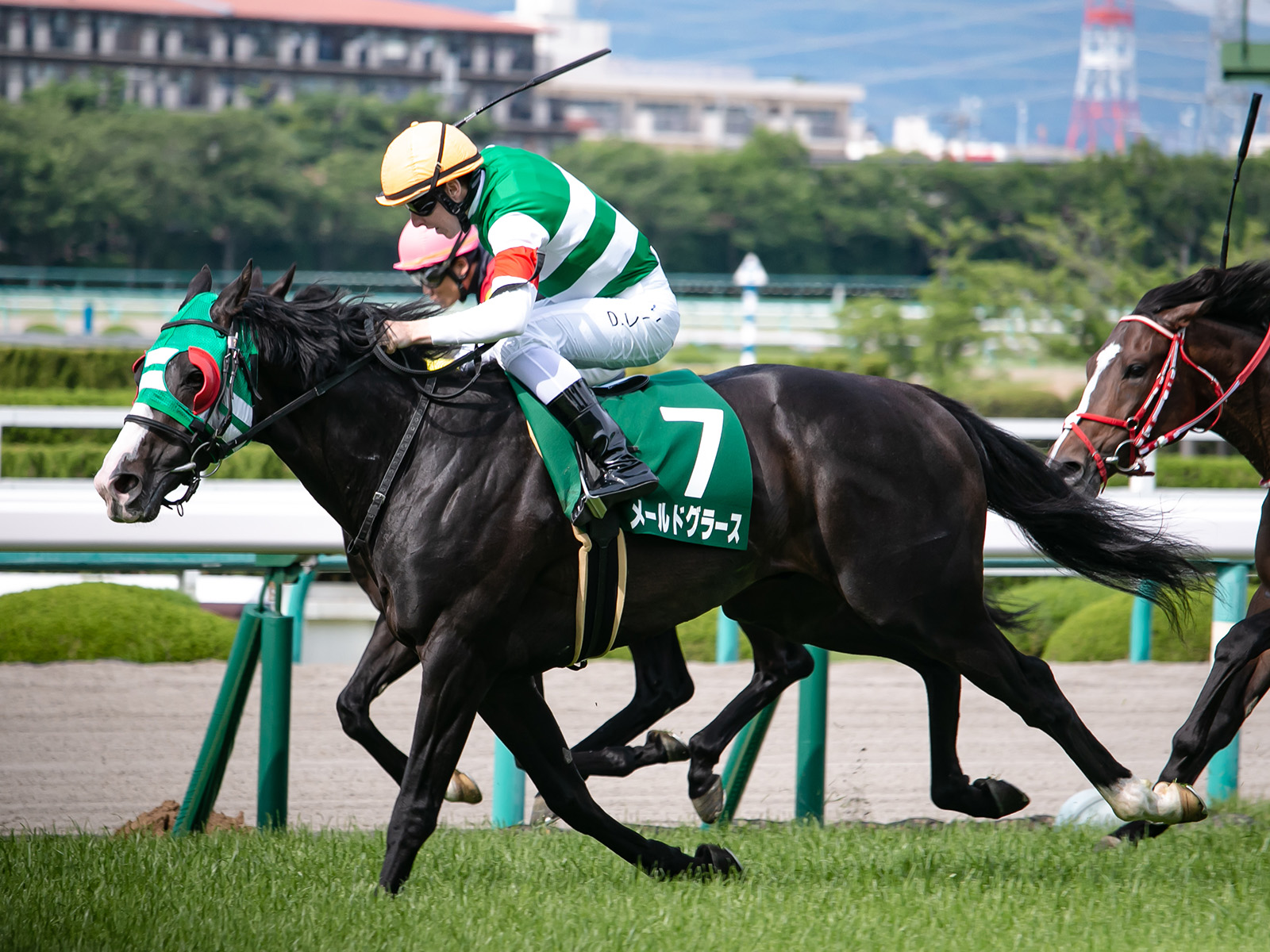
- Mer de Glace wins the 2019 Naruo Kinen
- Class: Grade 3
- Location: Hanshin Racecourse; Hyogo, Japan
- Inaugurated: 1951
- Race type: Thoroughbred - Flat racing

Race information
- Distance: 1,800 meters
- Surface: Turf
- Track: Right-handed (inner course)
- Qualification: Three-year-old and up
- Weight: Special Weight
- Purse: ¥ 92,980,000 (as of 2025): 1st: ¥ 43,000,000; 2nd: ¥ 17,000,000; 3rd: ¥ 11,000,000

The Naruo Kinen (鳴尾記念) is a Grade 3 middle-distance race for three-year-olds and older horses in the JRA. It is run over 1,800 meters at Hanshin Racecourse in December.

== History ==
The first race was held in 1951 and was run twice a year until 1953. After that, the race has been held once a year. The race was run over a variety of longer distances before being contested over 2,000 meters for the first time in 1997. The distance was 1,800 meters from 2006 to 2011 and raised again to 2,000 meters from 2012 to 2024.

The race was run at Chukyo Racecourse in 1959, and at Kyoto Racecourse in 1966, 1969 and 1990.

From 1955 to 1985, the race was for horses over 5 years old, however the requirement was changed to 4 years old in 1987.

Notable winners of the Naruo Kinen have included Ten Point, Bubble Gum Fellow, Tamamo Cross and Lovely Day.

== Weight ==
56 kg for three-year-olds, 57 kg for four-year-olds and above.

Allowances:

- 2 kg for fillies / mares
- 2 kg for southern hemisphere bred three-year-olds

Penalties (excluding two-year-old race performance):

- If a graded stakes race has been won within a year:
  - 3 kg for a grade 1 win (2 kg for fillies / mares)
  - 2 kg for a grade 2 win (1 kg for fillies / mares)
  - 1 kg for a grade 3 win
- If a graded stakes race has been won for more than a year:
  - 2 kg for a grade 1 win (1 kg for fillies / mares)
  - 1 kg for a grade 2 win

== Winners since 2000 ==
Year	Winner	Age	Jockey	Trainer	Owner	Time
2000	Daitaku Riva	3	Mikio Matsunaga	Kojiro Hashiguchi	Midori Jutaku Co Ltd	1:59.3
2001	Meisho Odo	6	Yuji Iida	Akihiro Iida	Yoshio Matsumoto	1:59.8
2002	Ibuki Government	6	Hiroshi Kawachi	Kojiro Hashiguchi	Ibuki	1:59.5
2003	Win Blaze	5	Hatsuhiro Kowata	Yoshitada Munataka	Win Co Ltd	2:00.0
2004	Sakura Century	4	Tetsuzo Sato	Shozo Sasaki	Sakura Commerce	2:00.7
2005	Mejiro Mantle	8	Yutaka Yoshida	Yokichi Okubo	Mejiro Stud	2:01.6
2006	Sakura Mega Wonder	3	Olivier Peslier	Yasuo Tomomichi	Sakura Commerce	1:46.9
2007	Higher Game	6	Yusuke Fujioka	Yokichi Okubo	Hiroyoshi Usuda	1:47.5
2008	Sakura Mega Wonder	5	Yuichi Fukunaga	Yasuo Tomomichi	Sakura Commerce	1:46.0
2009	Axion	6	Shinji Fujita	Yoshitaka Ninomiya	Tetsu Nakata	1:46.5
2010	Rulership	3	Yasunari Iwata	Katsuhiko Sumii	Sunday Racing	1:44.9
2011	Red Davis	3	Mirco Demuro	Hidetaka Otonashi	Tokyo Horse Racing	1:45.6
2012	To The Glory	5	Yuichi Fukunaga	Yasutoshi Ikee	U Carrot Farm	2:00.1
2013	Tokei Halo	4	Yutaka Take	Hisashi Shimizu	Nobuhiko Kimura	1:58.9
2014	Air Saumur	5	Keita Tosaki	Katushiko Sumii	Lucky Field	1:59.1
2015	Lovely Day	5	Yasunari Iwata	Yasuotoshi Ikee	Kaneko Makoto Holdings	1:58.8
2016	Satono Noblesse	6	Yuga Kawada	Yasuotoshi Ikee	Hajime Satomi	1:57.6
2017	Stay in Seattle	6	Yutaka Take	Yasuotoshi Ikee	Aoshiba Trading Corporation	1:59.4
2018	Strong Titan	5	Mirco Demuro	Yasuotoshi Ikee	Silk Racing	1:57.2
2019	Mer de Glace	4	Damian Lane	Hisashi Shimizu	U Carrot Farm	1:59.6
2020	Perform A Promise	8	Yuichi Fukunaga	Hideaki Fujiwara	Sunday Racing	2:00.1
2021 (Note: The race was run on Chukyo Racecourse)	Unicorn Lion	5	Ryusei Sakai	Yoshito Yahagi	Lion Race Horse	2:00.7
2022	Weltreisende	5	Damian Lane	Yasutoshi Ikee	Sunday Racing	1:57.7
2023	Boccherini	7	Suguru Hamanaka	Yasutoshi Ikee	Kaneko Makoto Holdings	1:59.1
2024 (Note: The race was run on Kyoto Racecourse)	Yoho Lake	6	Mirai Iwata	Yasuo Tomomichi	Kaneko Makoto Holdings	1:57.2
2025	David Barows	6	Mirai Iwata	Hiroyuki Uemura	Hirotsugu Inokuma	1:43.7

== Previous winners ==
- 1951: Takakurayama
- 1951 (autumn): Track O
- 1952: Hiro Homare
- 1952 (autumn): Queen Narubi
- 1953: Queen Narubi
- 1953 (autumn): Bostonian
- 1954: Royal Wood
- 1955: Royal Wood
- 1956: Sekai O
- 1957: Sekai O
- 1958: Sekai O
- 1959: Katsura Shuho
- 1960: Tokitsu Hiro
- 1961: Caesar
- 1962: Great Stan
- 1963: Ryu Forel
- 1964: Goukai
- 1965: Ballymoss Nisei
- 1966: Eight Crown
- 1967: Apo Onward
- 1968: Yama Pit
- 1969: Fine Rose
- 1970: New Kiminonawa
- 1971: Tama Hope
- 1972: Fi Dor
- 1973: Shinzan Misaki
- 1974: Strong Eight
- 1975: Naoki
- 1976: Taiho Hero
- 1977: Ten Point
- 1978: Erimo George
- 1979: Captain Namura
- 1980: Lindo Pleben
- 1981: Hashi Kranz
- 1982: Marubutsu Winner
- 1983: Kyoei Ascent
- 1984: Hashi Rodi
- 1985: Nishino Raiden
- 1986: Ron Spark
- 1987: Tamamo Cross
- 1988: Yaeno Muteki
- 1989: Mr. Cyclennon
- 1990: Kachiuma Hawk
- 1991: Nice Nature
- 1992: Takeno Velvet
- 1993: Ruble Act
- 1994: Star Man
- 1995: Kanetsu Cross
- 1996: Maruka Diesis
- 1997: Bubble Gum Fellow
- 1998: Sunrise Flag
- 1999: Suehiro Commander

== See also ==
- Horse racing in Japan
- List of Japanese flat horse races
