= Alywow =

Canadian-bred Thoroughbred racehorse

- Sire: Alysheba
- Grandsire: Alydar
- Dam: Triple Wow
- Damsire: Coastal
- Sex: Mare
- Foaled: February 7, 1991
- Died: March 2, 2002 (aged 11)
- Country: Canada
- Colour: Bay
- Breeder: Kinghaven Farms
- Owner: Kinghaven Farms
- Trainer: Roger Attfield
- Record: 19: 7-6-3
- Earnings: $648,431

Major wins
- Natalma Stakes (1993); Nijana Stakes (1994); Canadian Breeders' Cup Handicap (1994); Canadian Maturity Stakes (1995)

Awards
- Canadian Champion 3-Yr-Old Filly (1994); Canadian Champion Turf Horse (1994); Canadian Horse of the Year (1994)

Honours
- Alywow Stakes at Woodbine Racetrack; Canadian Racing Hall Of Fame (2009)
- Last updated on January 28, 2010

Alywow (February 7, 1991 – March 2, 2002) was a Canadian Thoroughbred Champion racehorse and a member of the Canadian Racing Hall Of Fame.

== Background ==
Alywow was owned and bred by David Willmot's Kinghaven Farms in King, Ontario. Her sire was Alysheba, the 1988 American Horse of the Year and a U.S. Racing Hall of Fame inductee whose own sire was another U.S. Racing Hall of Fame inductee, Alydar. Alywow's dam was Triple Wow, a daughter of 1979 Belmont Stakes winner Coastal, who was a son of U.S. Racing Hall of Fame inductee Majestic Prince. She was trained by Canadian Horse Racing Hall of Fame inductee Roger Attfield.

== Racing career ==
At two, Alywow won the Natalma Stakes on the turf course at Woodbine Racetrack, her home base in Toronto. At age three in 1994, she finished third on dirt in the most important race for Canadian-bred fillies, the Woodbine Oaks. Back on turf, she won Woodbine's Canadian Breeders' Cup Handicap and was second in the prestigious Grade I Canadian International Stakes turf race to the Juddmonte Farms colt Raintrap. Racing in the United States, Alywow finished second in the Flower Bowl Invitational Handicap, won the Lady Dean Stakes at Pimlico Race Course and under jockey Mike Smith came from last to first to win a division of the 1994 Nijana Stakes at Saratoga Race Course. Her 1994 performances earned Alywow three Sovereign Awards for Canadian Champion 3-Yr-Old Filly, Canadian Champion Turf Horse, and most prestigious of all, Canadian Horse of the Year.

Competing at age four in 1995, on the turf at Woodbine Racetrack, Alywow ran second in the Sky Classic Handicp and won the Canadian Maturity Stakes.

== Retirement ==
Retired to broodmare duty, Alywow produced a foal by Storm Cat in 1997 before being sold in 1998 while in foal to Mr. Prospector. Purchased by Pat O'Kelly's Kilcarn Stud near Navan in County Meath, Ireland, she produced two more foals, the first in 1999 from Danzig and another in 2000 by Sadler's Wells.

Alywow was seriously injured in an October 2001 accident when she crashed into a fence. Despite three operations, she never recovered and after a long struggle with a bone infection was humanely euthanized on March 2, 2002.

Alywow was inducted to the Canadian Horse Racing Hall of Fame on August 27, 2009.
