= Canadian Maturity Stakes =

Horse race in Toronto, Ontario, Canada

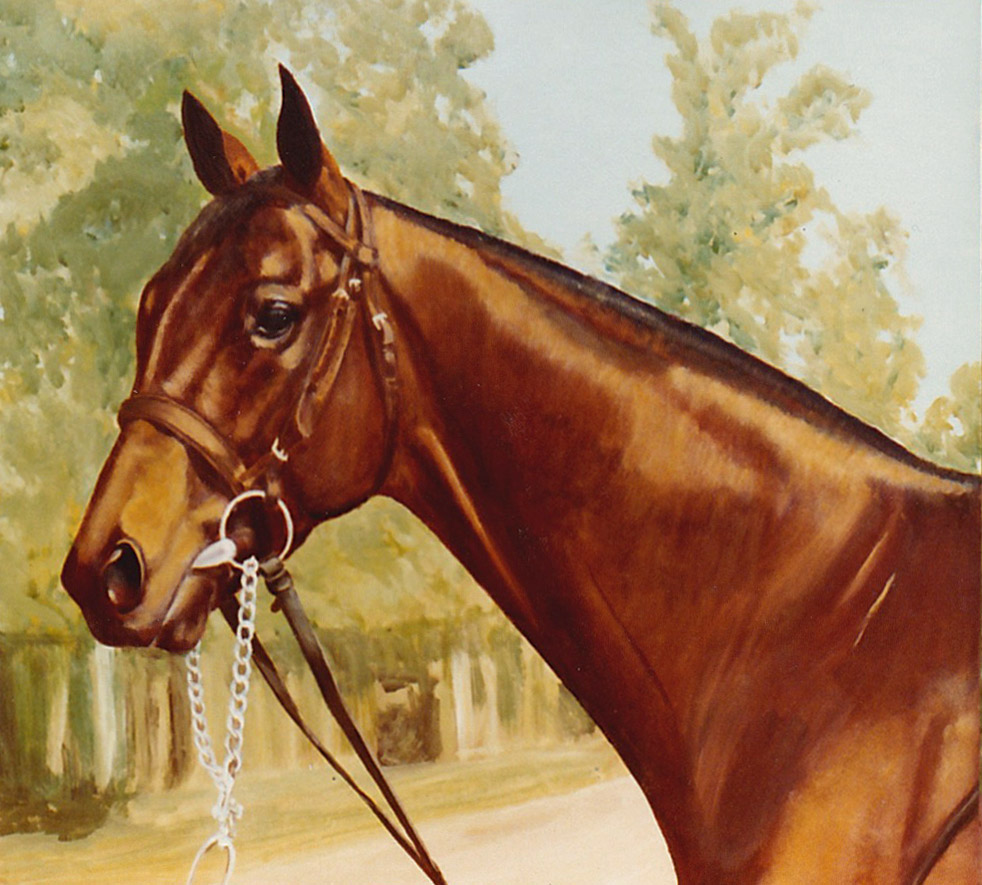
- Norcliffe, painted by Bob Demuyser (1920-2003)
- Class: Discontinued stakes
- Location: Woodbine Racetrack; Toronto, Ontario, Canada
- Inaugurated: 1953
- Race type: Thoroughbred - Flat racing
- Website: woodbineentertainment.com

Race information
- Distance: 1 1/4 miles (10 furlongs)
- Surface: Turf
- Track: Left-handed
- Qualification: Canadian bred four-year-olds
- Weight: Assigned

The Canadian Maturity Stakes was a Canadian Thoroughbred horse race run annually in late November at Woodbine Racetrack in Toronto, Ontario. Inaugurated in 1953, the race was restricted to four-year-old horses bred in Canada. It was contested on turf over a distance of a mile and a quarter (10 furlongs).

At a time when Thoroughbreds regularly ran on both dirt and turf, the Canadian Maturity Stakes attracted the best four-year-olds in Canada. However, by the late 1980s that situation had changed dramatically and by the time of the 1994 running, it attracted a field of only four horses.

The Canadian Maturity Stakes was won for five consecutive years between 1990 and 1994 by Sam-Son Farm and Hall of Fame trainer, Jim Day. Sam-Son Farm and Day also won in 1983.

== Records ==
Speed record: (Through 1998, Woodbine times were recorded in fifths of a second. Since 1999 they are in hundredths of a second)

- 2:00.20 - Classic Reign (1993)

Most wins by an owner:

- 6 - Sam-Son Farm (1983, 1990, 1991, 1992, 1993, 1994)

Most wins by a jockey:

- 4 - Robin Platts

Most wins by a trainer:

- 6 - James E. Day (1983, 1990, 1991, 1992, 1993, 1994)

== Winners ==
- 1996 - Dagda
- 1995 - Alywow
- 1994 - Desert Waves
- 1993 - Classic Reign
- 1992 - Dance Smartly
- 1991 - Sky Classic
- 1990 - Most Valiant
- 1989 - Imperial Colony
- 1988 - Lindjean
- 1987 - Boulder Run
- 1986 - Kazbek
- 1985 - Nagurski
- 1984 - Piper John
- 1983 - Twice An Angel
- 1982 - Frost King
- 1981 - Bejilla
- 1980 - Glorious Song
- 1979 - Overskate
- 1978 - Sound Reason
- 1977 - Norcliffe
- 1976 - Brilliant Sandy
- 1975 - Rash Move
- 1974 - Good Port
- 1973 - Nice Dancer
- 1972 - Belle Geste
- 1971 - Mary of Scotland
- 1970 - Jollysum Dancer
- 1969 - No Parando
- 1968 - Battling
- 1967 - He's A Smoothie
- 1966 - Good Old Mort
- 1965 - Langcrest
- 1964 - Albion Star
- 1963 - King Gorm
- 1962 - Majestic Hour
- 1961 - Hidden Treasure
- 1960 - Wonder Where
- 1959 - Foxy Phil
- 1958 - Nearctic
- 1957 - Censor
- 1956 - Ace Marine
- 1955 - King Maple
- 1954 - Chain Reaction
- 1953 - Foxy Pilot
