= Nice Nature =

Thoroughbred racehorse (1988–2023)

Nice Nature ナイスネイチャ
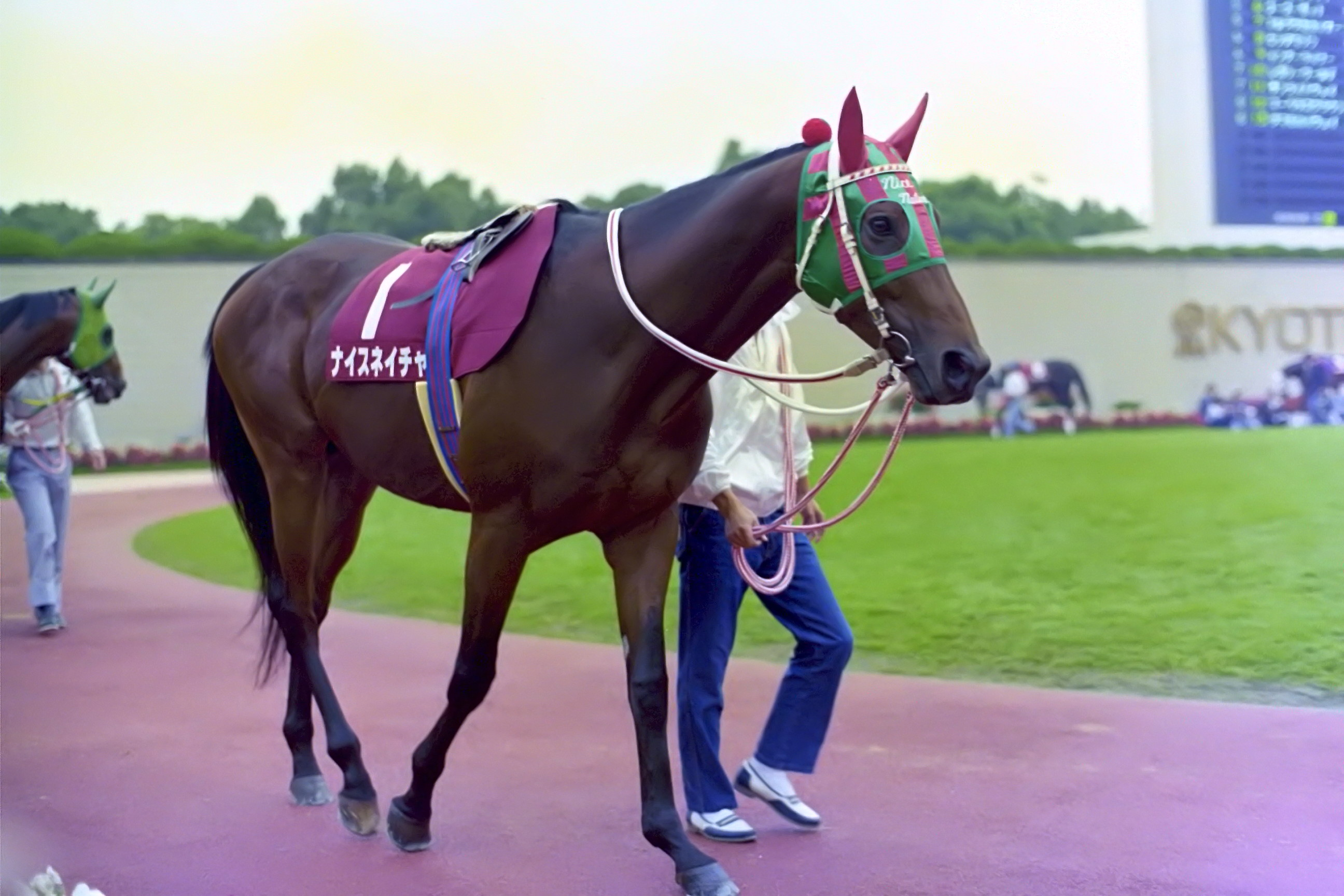
- Nice Nature in the paddock.
- Breed: Thoroughbred
- Sire: Nice Dancer
- Grandsire: Northern Dancer
- Dam: Urakawa Miyuki
- Damsire: Habitony
- Sex: Stallion
- Foaled: April 16, 1988
- Died: May 30, 2023 (aged 35)
- Country: Japan
- Colour: Bay
- Breeder: Watanabe Ranch
- Owner: Masao Toyoshima→ Taizo Toyoshima
- Racing colours
- Trainer: Matsunaga Yoshiharu（Rittō）
- Jockey: Mikio Matsunaga
- Record: 41: 7-6-8
- Earnings: ¥623,585,600

Major wins
- Kokura Kinen (1991); Kyoto Shimbun Hai (1991); Naruo Kinen (1991); Takamatsunomiya Hai (1994)

Nice Nature (Japanese: ナイスネイチャ, Hepburn: Naisu Neicha; April 16, 1988 – May 30, 2023) was a Japanese Thoroughbred racehorse and sire. From his debut in 1990 to his retirement in 1996, Nice Nature had a record of 41 starts and 7 wins, including 4 major wins. With a long GI racing career and often placing third, Nice Nature gained popularity as the "Bronze Collector". Nice Nature consecutively placed third in the 1991, 1992, and 1993 Arima Kinen. Before his death, Nice Nature was the oldest living stallion to have a JRA major win.

== Background ==
Nice Nature was born in 1988 at the Watanabe Ranch in Urakawa, Hokkaido. His sire, Nice Dancer, had six major wins in Canada, and his dam, Urakawa Miyuki, had three wins, including the 1984 open of what would become the Tulip Sho. Nice Nature's to-be owner Toyoshima Masao (Note: Japanese: 豊嶌正雄) made a deposit at Watanabe Ranch. According to the owner of the ranch Watanabe Kazuma, (Note: Japanese: 渡辺一馬) Nice Nature was average as a foal, nor did he stand out in the training ranch. However, Watanabe vaguely alluded that he felt that Nice Nature might be just as good as Nice Nice Nice, also out of Nice Dancer and the winner of the 1989 Kisaragi Sho and 1990 Kyōto Kinen. Nice Nature's to-be trainer Matsunaga Yoshiharu quickly embraced the impression of a "good horse", saying that he felt that things were moving in a "good direction" as he looked at Nice Nature's growth.

After reaching the racing age of three years in 1990, Nice Nature transferred to the Rittō Training Center in Rittō, Shiga under Matsunaga. After Nice Nature's older sister suffered a career ending injury, Nice Nature was trained cautiously and debuted relatively late in December.

== Racing career ==
Nice Nature won 4 major races, the Kokura Kinen, the Kyoto Shimbun Hai, and Naruo Kinen, all in 1991, as well as the Takamatsunomiya Hai in 1994. Nice Nature also started in a total of 34 group races throughout his career, including 16 GI races, which was a record at the time.

== Retirement & death ==
Due to problems on his right foreleg, Nice Nature was retired from racing in late 1996 in spite of initial plans to have the horse run in that year's Arima Kinen. The horse was sent to Hidaka Stallion Station to stand at stud, but retired in 2001 after siring a total of 17 registered horses. Alongside standing at stud, Nice Nature also became the poster character announcing the introduction of Quinella Place betting in JRA races in 1999. Nice Nature spent the remainder of his life pensioned at the Watanabe Ranch, the same farm where he was bred. He died on May 30, 2023, at the age of 35.

== In popular culture ==
An anthropomorphized version of Nice Nature appears as a character in the Japanese multimedia franchise Umamusume: Pretty Derby, voiced by Kaori Maeda. She is depicted as being cynical and pessimistic, and often undervalues her own achievements, causing her to intentionally place third during races. However, she learns to embrace the support of her fans and have more confidence in herself during her career mode with the help of the player trainer. In the third season of the anime, she also serves as a close friend and mentor figure to Kitasan Black.

Consequently, Umamusume players have raised tens of millions of yen each year in celebration of Nice Nature's birthday donation. The developers of the Umamusume game and Maeda were among those who sent their condolences upon Nice Nature's passing.

== Racing statistics ==
Below data is based on data available on JBIS Search and netkeiba.com.

Date	Age	Track	Race	Grade	Distance (Condition)	Entry	HN	Odds (Favored)	Finish	Time	Margins	Jockey	Winner (Runner-up)
Dec 2, 1990	2	Kyoto	2yo Newcomer		1,200m (Firm)	11	3	3.9 (3rd)	2nd	1:11.9	0.0	M. Matsunaga	Koei Royal
Dec 15, 1990	2	Kyoto	2yo Newcomer		1,400m (Standard)	9	4	1.7 (1st)	1st	1:26.1	-0.1	M. Matsunaga	(Prairie Love)
Jan 5, 1991	3	Kyoto	Fukujoso Tokubetsu	ALW	2,000m (Firm)	15	2	6.3 (3rd)	6th	2:04.2	1.2	M. Matsunaga	Sister Tosho
Jan 19, 1991	3	Kyoto	Wakagoma Stakes	OP	2,000m (Firm)	9	7	18.2 (5th)	3rd	2:02.5	1.1	M. Matsunaga	Tokai Teio
Jul 6, 1991	3	Chukyo	Nadeshiko Sho	ALW	1,800m (Good)	10	3	5.6 (3rd)	2nd	1:50.4	0.0	M. Matsunaga	Shirokita Teio
Jul 28, 1991	3	Kokura	Shiranui Tokubetsu	ALW	1,800m (Firm)	12	2	1.7 (1st)	1st	1:49.8	-0.4	M. Matsunaga	(Pierre Marie)
Aug 10, 1991	3	Kokura	Hazuki Sho	ALW	1,800m (Soft)	9	4	2.0 (1st)	1st	1:49.6	-0.2	M. Matsunaga	(Second Caesar)
Aug 25, 1991	3	Kokura	Kokura Kinen	G3	2,000m (Firm)	10	7	2.5 (1st)	1st	2:02.7	-0.3	M. Matsunaga	(Nuevo Tosho)
Oct 13, 1991	3	Kyoto	Kyoto Shimbun Hai	G2	2,200m (Firm)	14	11	3.3 (2nd)	1st	2:15.6	-0.1	M. Matsunaga	(Ibuki Maikagura, Shako Grade)
Nov 3, 1991	3	Kyoto	Kikuka Sho	G1	3,000m (Firm)	18	5	5.2 (2nd)	4th	3:09.8	0.3	M. Matsunaga	Leo Durban
Dec 8, 1991	3	Hanshin	Naruo Kinen	G2	2,500m (Firm)	11	8	1.9 (1st)	1st	2:36.3	-0.1	M. Matsunaga	(Mr. Cyclennon)
Dec 22, 1991	3	Nakayama	Arima Kinen	G1	2,500m (Firm)	15	5	8.7 (2nd)	3rd	2:31.1	0.5	M. Matsunaga	Dai Yusaku
Oct 11, 1992	4	Tokyo	Mainichi Okan	G2	1,800m (Firm)	11	2	3.4 (1st)	3rd	1:45.9	0.3	M. Matsunaga	Daitaku Helios
Nov 1, 1992	4	Tokyo	Tenno Sho (Autumn)	G1	2,000m (Firm)	18	11	3.9 (2nd)	4th	1:59.0	0.4	M. Matsunaga	Let's Go Tarquin
Nov 22, 1992	4	Kyoto	Mile Championship	G1	1,600m (Firm)	18	8	6.9 (4th)	3rd	1:33.7	0.4	M. Matsunaga	Daitaku Helios
Dec 27, 1992	4	Nakayama	Arima Kinen	G1	2,500m (Firm)	16	1	11.1 (4th)	3rd	2:33.7	0.2	M. Matsunaga	Mejiro Palmer
Jan 24, 1993	5	Kyoto	Nikkei Shinshun Hai	G2	2,200m (Firm)	12	7	2.7 (1st)	2nd	2:14.1	0.1	M. Matsunaga	El Casa River
Mar 14, 1993	5	Hanshin	Hanshin Daishoten	G2	3,000m (Firm)	11	7	1.9 (1st)	3rd	3:09.4	0.2	K. Minai	Mejiro Palmer
Apr 4, 1993	5	Hanshin	Sankei Osaka Hai	G2	2,000m (Firm)	16	5	2.4 (2nd)	2nd	2:04.1	0.8	M. Matsunaga	Mejiro McQueen
Oct 10, 1993	5	Tokyo	Mainichi Okan	G2	1,800m (Firm)	13	12	7.6 (4th)	3rd	1:45.9	0.4	M. Matsunaga	Shinko Lovely
Oct 31, 1993	5	Tokyo	Tenno Sho (Autumn)	G1	2,000m (Firm)	17	7	5.6 (2nd)	15th	2:01.5	2.6	M. Matsunaga	Yamanin Zephyr
Nov 28, 1993	5	Tokyo	Japan Cup	G1	2,400m (Firm)	16	11	39.2 (15th)	7th	2:25.1	0.7	M. Matsunaga	Legacy World
Dec 26, 1993	5	Nakayama	Arima Kinen	G1	2,500m (Firm)	14	12	26.6 (10th)	3rd	2:31.6	0.7	M. Matsunaga	Tokai Teio
Jan 23, 1994	6	Nakayama	American Jockey CC	G2	2,200m (Firm)	14	7	3.9 (2nd)	7th	2:14.7	0.6	M. Matsunaga	Matikanetannhauser
Apr 3, 1994	6	Hanshin	Sankei Osaka Hai	G2	2,000m (Firm)	14	11	4.6 (3rd)	2nd	2:01.8	0.6	M. Matsunaga	Nehai Caesar
Apr 24, 1994	6	Hanshin	Tenno Sho (Spring)	G1	3,200m (Good)	11	4	23.3 (7th)	4th	3:23.3	0.7	M. Matsunaga	Biwa Hayahide
Jun 12, 1994	6	Hanshin	Takarazuka Kinen	G1	2,200m (Firm)	14	2	12.0 (3rd)	4th	2:12.4	1.2	M. Matsunaga	Biwa Hayahide
Jul 10, 1994	6	Chukyo	Takamatsunomiya Hai	G2	2,000m (Firm)	13	12	8.5 (5th)	1st	2:00.7	-0.1	M. Matsunaga	(Star Ballerina)
Oct 9, 1994	6	Tokyo	Mainichi Okan	G2	1,800m (Firm)	11	4	4.5 (2nd)	6th	1:45.1	0.5	M. Matsunaga	Nehai Caesar
Oct 30, 1994	6	Tokyo	Tenno Sho (Autumn)	G1	2,000m (Firm)	13	5	30.4 (6th)	7th	1:59.1	0.5	M. Matsunaga	Nehai Caesar
Nov 27, 1994	6	Tokyo	Japan Cup	G1	2,400m (Firm)	14	11	23.3 (11th)	8th	2:24.4	0.8	M. Matsunaga	Marvelous Crown
Dec 15, 1994	6	Nakayama	Arima Kinen	G1	2,500m (Firm)	13	9	46.0 (11th)	5th	2:33.3	1.1	M. Matsunaga	Narita Brian
Feb 12, 1995	7	Kyoto	Kyoto Kinen	G2	2,200m (Firm)	8	6	7.7 (4th)	2nd	2:12.0	0.2	M. Matsunaga	Wako Chikako
Oct 8, 1995	7	Kyoto	Kyoto Daishoten	G2	2,400m (Firm)	13	1	13.0 (5th)	8th	2:26.0	0.7	M. Matsunaga	Hishi Amazon
Nov 26, 1995	7	Tokyo	Japan Cup	G1	2,400m (Firm)	14	15	46.9 (13th)	13th	2:26.2	1.6	M. Matsunaga	Lando
Dec 24, 1995	7	Nakayama	Arima Kinen	G1	2,500m (Firm)	12	5	43.1 (10th)	9th	2:35.4	1.8	M. Matsunaga	Mayano Top Gun
Mar 17, 1996	8	Chukyo	Chukyo Kinen	G3	2,000m (Good)	16	16	9.8 (7th)	4th	2:02.6	0.4	M. Matsunaga	Inazuma Takao
Apr 6, 1996	8	Nakayama	Lord Derby Challenge	G3	1,600m (Firm)	16	16	30.3 (10th)	6th	1:33.8	0.4	M. Matsunaga	Fujino Makken O
May 11, 1996	8	Kyoto	Keihan Hai	G3	2,200m (Firm)	16	4	10.8 (5th)	8th	2:13.6	0.8	M. Matsunaga	Dance Partner
Oct 27, 1996	8	Tokyo	Tenno Sho (Autumn)	G1	2,000m (Firm)	17	2	93.6 (14th)	10th	1:59.7	1.0	M. Matsunaga	Bubble Gum Fellow
Nov 16, 1996	8	Tokyo	Copa Republica Argentina	G2	2,500m (Firm)	18	2	17.5 (10th)	15th	2:34.0	2.2	M. Matsunaga	L-Way Win

Legend:
Turf Dirt

== Pedigree ==
Pedigree of Nice Nature (JPN), bay stallion, 1988
Sire Nice Dancer (CAN) b. 1969	Northern Dancer (CAN) b. 1961	Nearctic (CAN)	Nearco (ITY)
Sire Nice Dancer (CAN) b. 1969	Northern Dancer (CAN) b. 1961	Nearctic (CAN)	Lady Angela (GB)
Sire Nice Dancer (CAN) b. 1969	Northern Dancer (CAN) b. 1961	Natalma (USA)	Native Dancer (USA)
Sire Nice Dancer (CAN) b. 1969	Northern Dancer (CAN) b. 1961	Natalma (USA)	Almahmoud (USA)
Sire Nice Dancer (CAN) b. 1969	Nice Princess (USA) ch. 1964	Le Beau Prince (FR)	Fontenay (FR)
Sire Nice Dancer (CAN) b. 1969	Nice Princess (USA) ch. 1964	Le Beau Prince (FR)	Quillerie
Sire Nice Dancer (CAN) b. 1969	Nice Princess (USA) ch. 1964	Happy Night (FR)	Alizier (FR)
Sire Nice Dancer (CAN) b. 1969	Nice Princess (USA) ch. 1964	Happy Night (FR)	Happy Grace (GB)
Dam Urakawa Miyuki (JPN) b. 1981	Habitony (IRE) b. 1974	Habitat (USA)	Sir Gaylord (USA)
Dam Urakawa Miyuki (JPN) b. 1981	Habitony (IRE) b. 1974	Habitat (USA)	Little Hut (USA)
Dam Urakawa Miyuki (JPN) b. 1981	Habitony (IRE) b. 1974	Courteous Lady (USA)	Gallant Man (GB)
Dam Urakawa Miyuki (JPN) b. 1981	Habitony (IRE) b. 1974	Courteous Lady (USA)	Fleurlea (USA)
Dam Urakawa Miyuki (JPN) b. 1981	Kemmaru Midori (JPN) b. 1971	Kenmaru Chikara (JPN)	Hindostan (GB)
Dam Urakawa Miyuki (JPN) b. 1981	Kemmaru Midori (JPN) b. 1971	Kenmaru Chikara (JPN)	Mikazuki (JPN)
Dam Urakawa Miyuki (JPN) b. 1981	Kemmaru Midori (JPN) b. 1971	Ken Midori (JPN)	Guersant (FR)
Dam Urakawa Miyuki (JPN) b. 1981	Kemmaru Midori (JPN) b. 1971	Ken Midori (JPN)	Velvet (FR)

Inbreeding within 5 generations: None

Retrieved from Nice Nature's profile on JBIS (Japan Bloodstock Information Database)

Nice Nature's dam Urakawa Miyuki died on June 2, 2017, at the age of 36, making her the longest lived female thoroughbred in Japan to have been properly documented.
