= Hidden Treasure (horse) =

Canadian-bred Thoroughbred racehorse

- Sire: Dark Star
- Grandsire: Royal Gem
- Dam: Ratine
- Damsire: Bahram
- Sex: Stallion
- Foaled: 1957
- Country: Canada
- Colour: Bay
- Breeder: William R. Beasley
- Owner: William R. Beasley
- Trainer: Robert S. Bateman
- Record: 65: 24-16-6
- Earnings: $187,734

Major wins
- Display Stakes (1959); Carleton Stakes (1959); Summer Stakes (1959); Kingarvie Stakes (1960); Toronto Cup Handicap (1960); Fairbank Handicap (1960); Bison City Stakes (1960); Marine Stakes (1960); Heresy Stakes (1960); Woodstock Stakes (1960); Durham Cup Stakes (1961); Canadian Maturity Stakes (1961); Connaught Cup Stakes (1961); Jacques Cartier Stakes (1961, 1962); Inferno Handicap (1962); Quebec Stakes (1962); Fort Erie Handicap (1962); Canadian Handicap (1963) Canadian Classic Race wins: Breeders' Stakes (1960)

Awards
- Canadian Horse of the Year (1961)
- Last updated on May 20, 2010

Hidden Treasure (foaled 1957 in Ontario) is a Canadian Champion Thoroughbred racehorse who was voted Horse of the Year in 1961.

== Background ==
Hidden Treasure was a bay horse and raced by prominent horseman, Bill Beasley. He was sired by the 1953 Kentucky Derby winner, Dark Star. His dam was Ratine, a daughter of the undefeated 1935 English Triple Crown winner, Bahram. He was trained by Robert Bateman.

== Racing career ==
Hidden Treasure won the 1959 Display, Carleton and Summer Stakes and ran second to Victoria Park in the two most important races for Canadian two-year-olds, the Cup and Suaucer and Coronation Futurity Stakes. As a three-year-old, Hidden Treasure won a number of important races but after stepping on a nail, ran fifth in the 1960 Queen's Plate before winning the Breeders' Stakes. Following a year in which Hidden Treasure's wins included the 1961 Durham Cup, Canadian Maturity, Connaught Cup and Jacques Cartier Stakes, the then four-year-old was voted Canadian Horse of the Year honours. At five, Hidden Treasure won the 1962 Fort Erie Handicap while setting a new Fort Erie Racetrack track record for 6.5 furlongs (1:16.60) and at age six won the Canadian Handicap.

== Stud record ==
Retired to stud duty, Hidden Treasure sired a limited number of horses in a short career. Through his daughter Fiddly Dee he is the damsire of Fiddle Dancer Boy, winner of the 1981 Queen's Plate.

== Pedigree ==
Pedigree of Hidden Treasure
Sire Dark Star	Royal Gem	Dhoti	Dastur*
Sire Dark Star	Royal Gem	Dhoti	Tricky Aunt
Sire Dark Star	Royal Gem	French Gem	Beau Fils
Sire Dark Star	Royal Gem	French Gem	Fission
Sire Dark Star	Isolde	Bull Dog	Teddy
Sire Dark Star	Isolde	Bull Dog	Plucky Liege
Sire Dark Star	Isolde	Fiji	Bostonian
Sire Dark Star	Isolde	Fiji	O Girl
Dam Ratine	Bahram	Blandford	Swynford
Dam Ratine	Bahram	Blandford	Blanche
Dam Ratine	Bahram	Friar's Daughter*	Friar Marcus*
Dam Ratine	Bahram	Friar's Daughter*	Garron Lass*
Dam Ratine	Monel	Sir Greysteel	Roi Herode
Dam Ratine	Monel	Sir Greysteel	Grania
Dam Ratine	Monel	La Muiron	Durbar
Dam Ratine	Monel	La Muiron	Santa Maria

* Hidden Treasure is inbred 5S x 3D to the mare Friar's Daughter, meaning that she appears fifth generation (via Dastur) on the sire side of his pedigree, and third generation on the dam side of his pedigree.
