= Nishino Flower =

Japanese Thoroughbred racehorse

Nishino Flower ニシノフラワー
- Nishino Flower racing at the 1991 Sapporo Sansai Stakes.
- Breed: Thoroughbred
- Sire: Majestic Light
- Grandsire: Majestic Prince
- Dam: Duplicit
- Damsire: Danzig
- Sex: Mare
- Foaled: April 19, 1989
- Died: February 5, 2020 (aged 30)
- Country: Japan
- Color: Dark Bay
- Breeder: Nishiyama Stud
- Owner: Masayuki Nishiyama
- Racing colors
- Trainer: Masahiro Matsuda
- Record: 16: 7-1-3
- Earnings: ¥469,706,600

Major wins
- Sapporo Sansai Stakes (1991); Daily Hai Sansai Stakes (1991); Hanshin Sansai Himba Stakes (1991); Sprinters Stakes (1992); Yomiuri Milers Cup (1993); Japanese Classic Tiara Race wins: Oka Sho (1992)

Awards
- JRA Best Sprinter or Miler (1992); JRA Best Two-Year-Old Filly (1991); JRA Best Three-Year-Old Filly (1992)

Nishino Flower (Japanese: ニシノフラワー, Hepburn: Nishino Furawā, 19 April 1989 – 5 February 2020) was a Japanese Thoroughbred racehorse and broodmare who was active from 1991 to 1993. She competed in a total of 16 races, with an earnings total of ¥469,706,600 JPY ($2,964,290 USD).

== Background ==
Nishino Flower was foaled on April 19, 1989, at Nishiyama Farm in Mukawa, Hokkaido. She was a dark bay filly sired by Majestic Light, a son of Majestic Prince, a undefeated American stallion. Her maternal line was the same as that of Secretariat, with his Dam, Somethingroyal, being Nishino Flower's great-great-grandmdam.

Since 1966, Nishiyama Farm had mass‑produced and frequently raced japanese‑bred horses for several years. The farm achieved its greatest success in 1973, when it dethroned the leading breeder Shadai Farm—which had held the top ranking for ten consecutive years—and became Japan’s leading breeder that year. However, they never produced a Grade 1 winner under the Graded stakes system, despite a series of close calls—most notably Nishino Raiden's disqualification in the 1987 Tennō Shō (Spring).

By the late 1980s, over‑reliance on its own breeding stock had led to an increasingly narrow gene pool and declining results. To revitalize the farm’s bloodlines, Masayuki's son, Shigeyuki Nishiyama took the initiative to refresh the broodmare lines. He purchased an in‑foal broodmare at from the United States: Duplicit. She was carrying a foal by Majestic Light and was imported to Japan just before foaling. Because of her frail build as a foal, Nishino Flower was initially refused by several trainers. She eventually entered the stable of Masahiro Matsuda at the Ritto Training Center. Due to being born in Japan, she was allowed to participate in the classics and not considered a "gaikokusanba" (Foreign-bred horse).

== Racing career ==
=== 1991: three-year-old season ===
As her debut approached, the training load intensified, but her frail legs could not withstand it; she developed Shin splints in both forelegs, making it impossible to continue on a full training regime. Initially, she was scheduled to debut on the opening day of the first Sapporo Racecourse meeting, June 8, in a new‑mare race. However, due to the shin splints, she was delayed, debuting instead on the second day of the second Sapporo meeting, July 7. Because the shin splints had not yet fully healed, she was entered in a 1000‑meter dirt race, as the softer terrain placed less strain on her legs. She was the fourth favorite. She broke well, took the lead, and set the pace, never allowing the challengers to get close, winning by four lengths. After her legs fully healed, it was decided that she would race on turf. Participation in the Hakodate Nisai Stakes (late September) was considered, but given the Hakodate Racecourse was known to often have a poorly maintained, uneven track, she continued racing at Sapporo.

On July 28, she contested the Sapporo Nisai Stakes (G3), her first graded stakes. Among the rivals were highly rated horses such as Hagino Grandor (a foal of Symboli Rudolf) and Adorable (a foal of Northern Taste, who had won at Niigata). Nishino Flower was the fourth favorite. Breaking well from the innermost gate, she settled in third place, tracking the fast‑paced leader Iide Zao. From the final turn, Iide Zao tired and dropped back, and Nishino Flower took over the lead; on the straight, she advanced along the rail, finishing three‑and‑a‑half lengths lengths ahead of second place. Her performance was judged superior to that of Scarlet Bouquet (the previous year's winner, who had gone on to finish fourth in the Oka Shō and fifth in the Japanese Oaks), and talk began to circulate that she was a candidate for the Oka Sho. The victory also gave Masao Sato, in his 23rd year as a jockey, his first graded stakes win.

After a break, she returned to the stable at Ritto, with her next goal set on Hanshin Sansai Himba Stakes (later renamed the Hanshin Juvenile Fillies). On November 2, at the Daily Hai Nisai Stakes—A G2 and preparatory race—she was ridden by Seiki Tahara. She broke well and raced prominently. After the single turn, as she approached the final corner, closed on the leader and moved up to second. She spurted on the straight, took the lead, and pulled clear with 200 metres remaining. Thereafter, she ran alone, finishing three‑and‑a‑half lengths lengths ahead.

==== Hanshin Juvenile Fillies ====
Next, on December 1, she contested the feature race, the Hanshin Juvenile Fillies (G1) That year, the programme for three‑year‑old stakes had been restructured, making this, technically, the race's first year. Previously, there had been two GI races for three‑year‑olds at the end of the year, with participation largely determined by the training center: Kantō‑based horses went to the Asahi Hai Sansai Stakes, at Nakayama; Kansai‑based horses went to the Hanshin Sansai Stakes, at Hanshin. After the reform, the distinction changed from east‑west to sex: colts and geldings were assigned to the Asahi Hai Futurity Stakes, and fillies to the Hanshin race. The race was set at 1600 meters on turf at Hanshin, the same distance and course as the following year's classic opener, the Oka Sho.

External Link
- 1991 Hanshin Sansai Himba Stakes (GI); Race Footage: Video via the Official JRA YouTube Channel

Fifteen fillies from both the east and west gathered. Nishino Flower was the favorite; the second favorite was Shinko Lovely, a Kanto‑based foreign‑bred (thus ineligible for the classics), who was undefeated in two starts.

Starting from gate 4, Nishino Flower broke well and took the lead. As they approached the corner, pressure from the outside caused her to lose her path, leaving Sato with no choice but to slow down and race from the back, which was disadvantageous for Nishino Flower, who was accustomed to running at the front of the pack. Sato managed to calm the horse down and keep Nishino Flower running without any trouble; as a result, they secured a good position, settling into third place. Eventually, as Foundry Evert began to run out of energy in the final corner, they moved into second place, chasing Uto Jane, who had taken the lead. In the home stretch, Uto Jane ran alone for a while. Nishino Flower made her move past the halfway point of the stretch, passing Uto Jane to take the lead. Behind Nishino Flower were Sanei Thank You, Disco Hall, and Shinko Lovely, who made a late charge to close in on her. For Nishino Flower, who had previously won by margins of three lengths or more, this was her first close race, finishing three-quarters of a length ahead of second date.

=== 1992: four-year-old season ===
==== Tulip Sho ====
Nishino Flower’s prep race for the Oka Sho, the first classic of the season started on 15 March, in the Tulip Sho (Open Race), a "designated Oka Sho qualifier." Among her rivals were Adorable and Oguri White, the latter being a sister of Oguri Cap. Regardless, Nishino Flower was once again the favorite.

From the start she raced prominently as usual, settling in third place. Soon, however, she was squeezed from the outside and forced to drop back. she tried to regain lost ground, but she was repeatedly blocked by horses in front of her and lost valuable momentum; on the straight she allowed Adorable, who had already slipped through to the lead, to run alone. Nishino Flower finally found a clear path with 300 meters remaining, but by then Adorable had built up a safe distance. She fell short by three and a half lengths. Placing second, along her high earnings in the previous year, guaranteed her entry rights to the Oka Sho.

==== Oka Sho ====
External Link
- 1992 Oka Sho (G1); Race Footage via the Official JRA YouTube Channel

On April 12, she entered the Oka Sho (GI). Her defeat in the preliminary race had lead many to lose faith in her ability, with reports describing the field as a "wide-open race"; although Nishino Flower was the favorite, she was not the clear-cut, undisputed favorite, and her win odds were 2.3 to 1. The next favorites were Sanei Thank You, Disco Hall, El Casa River, Dantsu Centaur, and Adorable.

Her training team was to train her back to peak condition by 10 days before the race, and have her rest for at least 3. Her new jockey, Hirosi Kawachi, decided to subject her to consecutive intense workouts three days before the race as well.

Nishino Flower took the lead early on initially racing in third place. However, she yielded to several horses pushing from the outside, and settled into 5th or 6th place. Midway through the final turn, as the pace increased, she advanced to a position where she could catch up to the pace-setter, Vienna Concert. As they entered the corner, Nishino Flower pulled away and managed to reach the front of the pack yet again, with Adorable half a length behind. Exiting the corner, she surged ahead, pulling away from Adorable and the rest of the field to run alone, and quickly built a comfortable lead. Although she began to tire out in the final stretch and struggled to extend her lead, she maintained her position, finishing first place by three and a half lengths.

This was Kawachi's fourth Oka Sho win, while it marked the first Classic victory for Matsuda and Nishiyama. She became the fourth filly in history to win the Oka Sho as the top-ranked 3-year-old filly, following Tesco Gabby in 1975, Titania in 1976, and Mejiro Ramonu in 1986.

==== 3 Consecutive Defeats ====
On May 24, still worn down and her appetite diminished following the Oka Sho, the filly was entered in the Yushun Himba (Japanese Oaks) (GI)—the second leg of the fillies' classics—more to maintain her physique than to press for a win. The preparation was extremely tight: carrying a career‑low 420 kg in the Oka Sho, she had only managed to regain 8 kg for the Oaks. Despite being the favourite, ahead of the trial winners Kyōwa Hōseki and Taiko Sarge, as well as the Oka Sho rivals Adorable and Sanei Than You, she weakened on the straight and finished a distant seventh.

After a summer break at Nishiyama Farm in Hokkaido, Nishino Flower's next goal was set to be the final leg of the Fillies' Triple Crown at the time, the autumn Queen Elizabeth II Cup (before it was replaced by the Shūka Shō in 1996).

She resumed to racing in the Rose Stakes (G2) on October 25, going off as the favourite. Racing second throughout, she was first passed by El Casa River, then outfought for the 3rd placing, finishing fourth behind Sanei Thank You and Fantasy Suzuka.

On November 15, she contested the Queen Elizabeth Cup (G1) as the sixth favourite. She had a good start, but despite keeping a good pace, found no room to maneuver on the back-half of the race, and was left behind. The 17th‑ranked Takeno Velvet swooped from the rear to defeat her by approximately three‑and‑a‑half lengths; she was also beaten by a nose by Mejiro Kammuri, taking third.

Kawachi later recalled, "She had a limit when it came to distance," and Matsuda concurred: "She was a classic miler."

==== Sprinters Stakes ====
For the end of the racing season, the 1200 meter Sprinters Stakes was selected against the possibility of a longer handicap race for fillies. At Nakayama on December 20, she raced against a powerful field of older males; including the back‑to‑back Mile Champion Daitaku Helios, and the future "sprint king" Sakura Bakushin O. Amidst this field, Nishino Flower was the second favorite at 4.9-to-1 odds, behind only Daitaku Helios. Although she had the advantage in weight, Matsuda and Kawachi believed she was at a disadvantage against top-tier sprinters in a race with a shorter distance. Therefore, Kawachi decided to take a completely different approach with Nishino Flower, who had previously racked up victories by racing from the front, instead biding their time at the back of the pack.

External Link
- 1992 Sprinters Stakes (G1); Race Footage from the Official JRA YouTube Channel

Breaking from gate 8 in the fourth stall, she settled in 12th position, at the rear. She tracked a fast pace set by Sakura Bakushin O, Daitaku Helios, and Yamanin Zephyr, all of whom contested the early lead. Even from the back, Kawachi attempted to pass frequently, trying to edge her into a more forward position, but Nishino Flower struggled to improve and reached the final turn still trapped at the rear. She entered the straight in ninth place, well behind the leaders Sakura Bakushin O and Yamanin Zephyr, with no path except the extreme outside.

From the outside, Nishino Flower ran with all her power and began to pull ahead. In the front of the pack, Yamanin Zephyr had surged clear along the rail to take a solo lead. The front-runners, having contested a fast pace, began to tire as they climbed the uphill stretch, and Nishino Flower steadily closed the gap as the finish line drew near. Nishino Flower produced one more burst of acceleration, rapidly cutting into Yamanin Zephyr's lead, threatening the front, and finally overtaking him in the very last stride. She crossed the finish line a neck ahead of Yamanin Zephyr.

This was her third GI victory, becoming the first four‑year‑old filly to win the Sprinter's Stakes since it was upgraded to GI status.

=== 1993: five-year-old season ===
She kicked off her campaign in the Yomiuri Milers Cup (G2) on February 28, re-matching with Yamanin Zephyr. Starting from gate 3, she took the lead early on. She settled into third place behind the pace-setting Narcissus Noir. The pace was slow. As a result, the race was fought mostly in the home stretch, with Nishino Flower leading and Yamanin Zephyr chasing, a scenario exactly opposite to that of the Sprinters Stakes; however, Nishino Flower did not allow Yamanin Zephyr to catch up. She one again pulled ahead with all her strength, leaving the rest of the field behind and crossing the finish line three and a half lengths ahead. This victory boosted the training team's confidence in Nishino Flower's ability and, rather than competing in the preliminary Keio Spring Cup, they signed her up directly for the Yasuda Kinen (G1).

Starting that same year, the Yasuda Kinen became an international race, allowing horses bred and trained abroad to compete. Nishino Flower raced against two foreign-trained horses: Kitwood, from France, and Lotus Pool, from the United States, in addition to her usual rivals, such as Yamanin Zephyr and Shinko Lovely.

Nishino Flower took the lead from the start, but tired out quickly and was forced to chase from the middle of the pack. She also suffered a major setback when she was bumped by another horse. She was unable to make a move in the home stretch, finishing in 10th place, despite having been voted the favorite. Next, on June 13, she competed in the Takarazuka Kinen (G1); this time, shee was the third favorite behind Mejiro McQueen and Mejiro Palmer but finished eighth, having run out of steam after getting restless partway through the race. She returned to Nishiyama Farm in Hokkaido, resting throughout the duration of her summer break.

Her autumn campaign began on October 30, with the Swan Stakes (G2), a rematch with Shinko Lovely. With a G2 victory and a G1 second-place finish to her credit, she was considered a lower-class horse than Nishino Flower. However, Shinko Lovely had won six races over the past year, finishing in the top three in every start, and was on the rise after defeating Yamanin Zephyr at the Mainichi Ōkan. Nishino Flower, on the other hand, had been active since her 3-year-old season and was already a fully developed horse with little room for further improvement. Going off as the second favourite behind Shinko lovely, she finished third.

In the subsequent Mile Championship (G1) on November 21, she was again the second favorite, trailing Shinko Lovely once more. However, the track was in heavy condition that day, creating an unfavorable stage for Nishino Flower, who relied on her speed to take the lead on the final corner. Although she managed to settle and keep pace throughout the race, she began to lose her footing on the downhill stretch of the third turn, and quickly lost her position. Unable to make use of her finishing kick, she fell back and finished 13th. This allowed Shinko Lovely to claim the win on her retirement race.

External Link
- 1993 Sprinters Stakes (G1); Race Footage from the Official JRA YouTube Channel

Then, on December 19, she raced for a repeat victory in the Sprinters Stakes. Standing in her way were Yamanin Zephyr, who had defeated her in the Yasuda Kinen, and Sakura Bakushin O; Nishino Flower was the third favorite behind them. Nishino Flower ran in the middle of the pack and made a move in the final straight, she chased down the front-runners but could not catch up to them. She finished third, three-quarters of a length behind Yamanin Zephyr, and more than three lengths behind Sakura Bakushin O, who, having maintained the lead all throughout the race, pushed toward the front and away from the pack halfway through the homestretch. With the hopes for a repeat victory now having proved false, Nishino Flower's team decided to retire her from racing.

A retirement ceremony was held at Hanshin Racecourse on January 9, 1994. She was ridden by Kawachi, wearing the No. 9 race number from the Oka Sho.

== Broodmare career and death ==
After her retirement from racing, she became a broodmare at Nishiyama Farm in Mukawa, Hokkaido.

In her first year, she was mated with Sheriff's Star, a Grand Prix de Saint-Cloud winner who Nishiyama had imported. She failed to conceive, but continued to be mated with strong stallions of prestigious bloodlines, in the hopes of producing another stakes winner for Nishiyama.

In 2002, she mated with Seiun Sky, winner of two classic races and also owned by Nishiyama. In 2004, she traveled to England to mate with Singspiel, an Eclipse Award recipient. No mating attempts after 2007 were successful; attempts stopped in 2011.

On February 5, 2020, she died of old age at 30 years old.

c = colt, f = filly, g = gelding

Foaled	Name	Sex	Sire	Major Wins
1995	Failed to conceive		Sheriff's Star	
1996	Nishino Seiryu	c	Brian's Time	1999 Wakakoma Stakes
1997	unnamed	c	Sunday Silence	
1998	Nishino Shishi O	c	Lammtarra	2003 Suita Special
1999	Nishino Raimei	c	Dancing Brave	
2000	Nishino Harlock	g	Taiki Shuttle	
2001	Nishino Due	c	Brian's Time	
2002	Nishino Kaedemaru	c	Peintre Celebre	Nishigo Tokubetsu, Atsuta Tokubetsu
2003	Nishino Mirai	f	Seiun Sky	
2004	Nishino Manamusume	f	Agnes Tachyon	Utopia Stakes, Horikawa Tokubetsu
2006	unnamed	f	Singspiel	
2007	Nishino Offense	g	Agnes Tachyon	
2008	Failed to conceive		Rock of Gibraltar	
2009	Failed to conceive		Tanino Gimlet	
2010	Failed to conceive		Daiwa Major	
2011	Failed to conceive		Symboli Kris S	

== In popular culture ==
An anthropomorphized version of Nishino Flower appears as a character in the Japanese multimedia franchise Umamusume: Pretty Derby, voiced by Haruna Kawai. She is depicted as a kindhearted child prodigy, whose exceptional racing talents allowed her to skip several grades and enroll into Tracen Academy, and holds the distinction of being the shortest playable trainee in the game at 135 centimeters tall. She strives to grow up to be a proper lady, but often struggles with insecurities over how much younger she is compared to her peers. She is often depicted alongside her close friend Seiun Sky, which references their real-life counterparts being stablemates owned by Nishiyama Stud.

== Racing statistics ==
Out of 16 starts, she won 7 of her races. Data below shows her racing statistics taken from both netkeiba and JBIS.

Date	Age	Race	Grade	Distance	Surface	Condition	Track	Entry	Finish	Time	Margin	Jockey	Winner (Runner-up)
Jul 7, 1991	3	3YO Debut		1000m	Dirt	Fast	Sapporo	10	1st	0:59.8	-0.7	Masao Sato	(Meiner the Great)
Jul 28, 1991	3	Sapporo Sansai Stakes	G3	1200m	Turf	Firm	Sapporo	14	1st	1:01.5	-0.6	Masao Sato	(Disco Hall)
Nov 2, 1991	3	Daily Hai Sansai Stakes	G2	1400m	Turf	Firm	Kyoto	10	1st	1:23.2	-0.6	Seiki Tabara	(Uto Jane)
Dec 1, 1991	3	Hanshin Sansai Himba Stakes	G1	1600m	Turf	Firm	Hanshin	15	1st	1:36.2	-0.1	Masao Sato	(Sanei Thank You)
Mar 15, 1992	4	Tulip Sho	OP	1600m	Turf	Good	Hanshin	14	2nd	1:39.1	0.6	Masao Sato	Adorable
Apr 12, 1992	4	Oka Sho	G1	1600m	Turf	Firm	Hanshin	18	1st	1:37.5	-0.6	Hiroshi Kawachi	(Adorable)
May 24, 1992	4	Yushun Himba	G1	2400m	Turf	Firm	Tokyo	18	7th	2:29.5	0.6	Hiroshi Kawachi	Adorable
Oct 25, 1992	4	Rose Stakes	G2	2000m	Turf	Firm	Kyoto	13	4th	2:00.8	0.6	Hiroshi Kawachi	El Casa River
Nov 15, 1992	4	Queen Elizabeth II Cup	G1	2400m	Turf	Firm	Kyoto	18	3rd	2:27.7	0.6	Hiroshi Kawachi	Takeno Velvet
Dec 20, 1992	4	Sprinters Stakes	G1	1200m	Turf	Firm	Nakayama	16	1st	1:07.7	-0.1	Hiroshi Kawachi	(Yamanin Zephyr)
Feb 28, 1993	5	Yomiuri Milers Cup	G2	1600m	Turf	Firm	Hanshin	12	1st	1:36.4	-0.6	Hiroshi Kawachi	(Yamanin Zephyr)
May 16, 1993	5	Yasuda Kinen	G1	1600m	Turf	Firm	Tokyo	16	10th	1:34.1	0.6	Hiroshi Kawachi	Yamanin Zephyr
Jun 13, 1993	5	Takarazuka Kinen	G1	2200m	Turf	Firm	Hanshin	11	8th	2:20.9	3.2	Hiroshi Kawachi	Mejiro McQueen
Oct 30, 1993	5	Swan Stakes	G2	1400m	Turf	Soft	Kyoto	16	3rd	1:22.0	0.1	Hiroshi Kawachi	Shinko Lovely
Nov 21, 1993	5	Mile Championship	G1	1600m	Turf	Heavy	Kyoto	15	13th	1:36.6	0.9	Hiroshi Kawachi	Shinko Lovely
Dec 19, 1993	5	Sprinters Stakes	G1	1200m	Turf	Firm	Nakayama	14	3rd	1:08.4	0.5	Hiroshi Kawachi	Sakura Bakushin O

== Pedigree ==
Pedigree of Nishino Flower, dark bay mare, 1989
Sire Majestic Light b. 1973	Majestic Prince ch. 1966	Raise a Native	Native Dancer
Sire Majestic Light b. 1973	Majestic Prince ch. 1966	Raise a Native	Raise You
Sire Majestic Light b. 1973	Majestic Prince ch. 1966	Gay Hostess	Royal Charger
Sire Majestic Light b. 1973	Majestic Prince ch. 1966	Gay Hostess	Your Hostess
Sire Majestic Light b. 1973	Irradiate gr. 1966	Ribot	Tenerani
Sire Majestic Light b. 1973	Irradiate gr. 1966	Ribot	Romanella
Sire Majestic Light b. 1973	Irradiate gr. 1966	High Voltage	Ambiorix
Sire Majestic Light b. 1973	Irradiate gr. 1966	High Voltage	Dynamo
Dam Duplicit b. 1985	Danzig b. 1977	Northern Dancer	Nearctic
Dam Duplicit b. 1985	Danzig b. 1977	Northern Dancer	Natalma
Dam Duplicit b. 1985	Danzig b. 1977	Pas de Nom	Admiral's Voyage
Dam Duplicit b. 1985	Danzig b. 1977	Pas de Nom	Petitioner
Dam Duplicit b. 1985	Fabulous Fraud b. 1974	Le Fabuleux	Wild Risk
Dam Duplicit b. 1985	Fabulous Fraud b. 1974	Le Fabuleux	Anguar
Dam Duplicit b. 1985	Fabulous Fraud b. 1974	The Bride	Bold Ruler
Dam Duplicit b. 1985	Fabulous Fraud b. 1974	The Bride	Somethingroyal
