= Nice Dancer =

Canadian Thoroughbred racehorse

- Sire: Northern Dancer
- Grandsire: Nearctic
- Dam: Nice Princess
- Damsire: Le Beau Prince
- Sex: Stallion
- Foaled: 1969
- Country: Canada
- Colour: Bay
- Breeder: Dean Alfange
- Owner: Tom Morton & Harlequin Ranches
- Trainer: Jerry G. Lavigne
- Record: 20: 10-2-3
- Earnings: $154,825

Major wins
- Achievement Handicap (1972); Manitoba Derby (1972); Col. R. S. McLaughlin Handicap (1972); Canadian Maturity Stakes (1973); Dominion Day Handicap (1973) Canadian Classic Race wins: Breeders' Stakes (1972)

Awards
- Canadian Champion Three-Year-Old Male Horse (1972)
- Last updated on February 13, 2010

Nice Dancer (1969–1997) was a Canadian Thoroughbred racehorse.

== Background ==
He was from the last Canadian-sired crop of Northern Dancer before the International champion sire was relocated to Windfields Farm American subsidiary in Maryland.

Owned by Tom Morton and Dick Bonnycastle's Harlequin Ranches, Nice Dancer was trained by Jerry Lavigne.

== Racing career ==
In his three-year-old season, the colt was ridden primarily by future Canadian and U.S. Hall of Fame jockey, Sandy Hawley. In addition to important stakes races including the Manitoba Derby at Assiniboia Downs in Winnipeg, Manitoba, Nice Dancer set a new Woodbine track record for a mile and three sixteenths in winning the inaugural running of the Col. R. S. McLaughlin Handicap. He won the third leg of the 1972 Canadian Triple Crown series, the Breeders' Stakes, a race run on turf at a distance of 1½ miles (12 furlongs). In the pre Sovereign Award era, Nice Dancer is historically viewed as the Canadian Champion 3-Year-Old Male Horse of 1972.

At age four, Nice Dancer won the Dominion Day Handicap and the Canadian Maturity Stakes before being retired to stud duty.

== Stud record ==
He stood in Canada from 1974 to 1978 during which time he sired seventy-six foals out of which nine became stakes winners. His most notable offspring was Fiddle Dancer Boy, winner of the 1981 Queen's Plate. Sent to a breeding farm in Japan, Nice Dancer sired nine more stakes winners, most notably Nice Nature, before his death at age twenty-eight in 1997. He is the damsire of Glide Path, winner of the 1995 Stockholm Cup International, Sweden's most important race, as well as JRA Hall of Fame inductee Tokai Teio.

== Pedigree ==
Pedigree of Nice Dancer, bay stallion, 1969
Sire Northern Dancer	Nearctic	Nearco	Pharos
Sire Northern Dancer	Nearctic	Nearco	Nogara
Sire Northern Dancer	Nearctic	Lady Angela	Hyperion
Sire Northern Dancer	Nearctic	Lady Angela	Sister Sarah
Sire Northern Dancer	Natalma	Native Dancer	Polynesian
Sire Northern Dancer	Natalma	Native Dancer	Geisha
Sire Northern Dancer	Natalma	Almahmoud	Mahmoud
Sire Northern Dancer	Natalma	Almahmoud	Arbitrator
Dam Nice Princess	Le Beau Prince	Fontenay	Tornado
Dam Nice Princess	Le Beau Prince	Fontenay	Flying Colours
Dam Nice Princess	Le Beau Prince	Quillerie	Sultan Mahomed
Dam Nice Princess	Le Beau Prince	Quillerie	Hotep Heres
Dam Nice Princess	Happy Knight	Alizier	Teleferique
Dam Nice Princess	Happy Knight	Alizier	Alizarine
Dam Nice Princess	Happy Knight	Happy Grace	His Grace
Dam Nice Princess	Happy Knight	Happy Grace	Happy Morn (family: 1-h)
