= Kokura Kinen =

Kokura Kinen 小倉記念
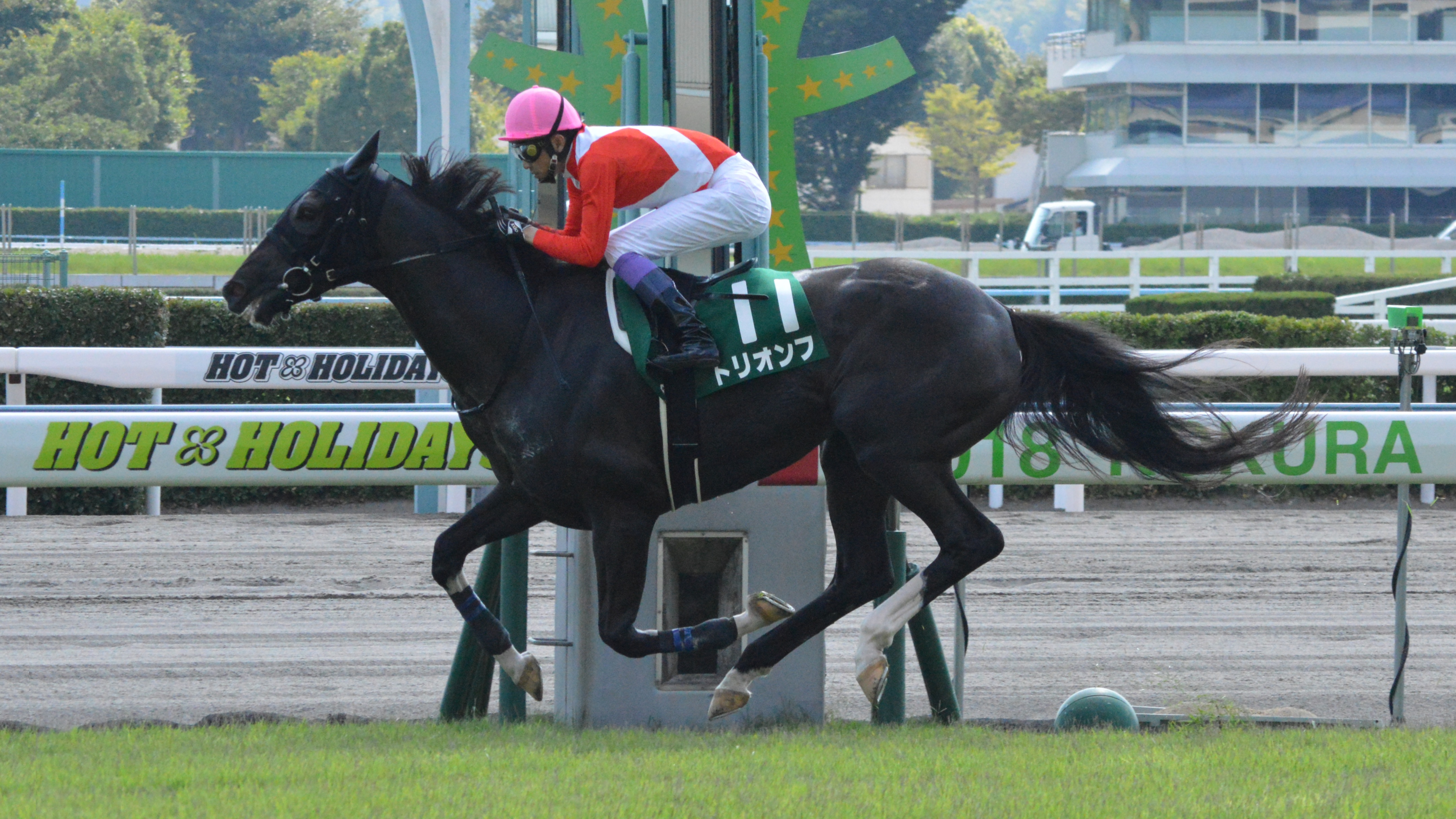
- Triomphe winning the 2018 Kokura Kinen
- Class: Grade 3
- Location: Kokura Racecourse
- Inaugurated: 1965
- Race type: Thoroughbred Flat racing

Race information
- Distance: 2000 metres
- Surface: Turf
- Track: Right-handed
- Qualification: 3-y-o+
- Weight: Handicap
- Purse: ¥ 92,980,000 (as of 2025): 1st: ¥ 43,000,000; 2nd: ¥ 17,000,000; 3rd: ¥ 11,000,000

The Kokura Kinen (Japanese 小倉記念) is a Grade 3 horse race in Japan for Thoroughbreds aged three and over. It is run in August over a distance of 2000 metres on turf at Kokura Racecourse, in Kitakyushu, Fukuoka Prefacture.

The Kokura Kinen was first run in 1965 and has held Grade 3 status since 1984. The race was run over 1800 metres at Kyoto Racecourse in 1998.

== Winners since 2000 ==
Year	Winner	Age	Jockey	Trainer	Owner	Time
2000	Mikki Dance	4	Tetsuzo Sato	Toshiyuki Hattori	Hisashi Miki	1:59.7
2001	Rosado	5	Futoshi Komaki	Kojiro Hashiguchi	Shadai Race Horse	2:00.2
2002	Aratama Indy	5	Yuji Iida	Megumu Shinkawa	Michi Araki	1:59.7
2003	Rosado	7	Koshiro Take	Kojiro Hashiguchi	Shadai Race Horse	2:00.7
2004	Meisho Kaido	5	Yutaka Take	Masahiro Sakaguchi	Yoshio Matsumoto	1:58.5
2005	Meisho Kaido	6	Yutaka Take	Masahiro Sakaguchi	Yoshio Matsumoto	1:58.0
2006	Swift Current	5	Yuichi Fukunaga	Hideyuki Mori	Shadai Race Horse	1:57.8
2007	Sanrei Jasper	5	Tetsuzo Sato	Shigetada Takahashi	Keiji Nagai	1:58.7
2008	Dream Journey	4	Kenichi Ikezoe	Yasutoshi Ikee	Sunday Racing	1:57.9
2009	Dance A Joy	8	Koichi Tsunoda	Masahiro Matsunaga	Yasuaki Kato	1:58.3
2010	Nihonpillow Regalo	7	Manabu Sakai	Toshiyuki Hattori	Hyakutaro Kobayashi	1:57.9
2011	Italian Red	5	Suguru Hamanaka	Sei Ishikaza	Tokyo Horse Racing	1:57.3
2012	Expedition	5	Suguru Hamanaka	Sei Ishikaza	Shadai Race Horse	1:57.3
2013	Meisho Naruto	5	Yutaka Take	Hiroshi Takeda	Yoshio Matsumoto	1:57.1
2014	Satono Noblesse	4	Ryuji Wada	Yasutoshi Ikee	Hajime Satomi	1:59.8
2015	Azuma Shuttle	4	Fuma Matsukawa	Tadashi Kayo	Tetsuji Azuma	1:58.0
2016	Crans Montana	7	Ryuji Wada	Hidetaka Otonashi	Shadai Race Horse	2:00.0
2017	Tatsu Gogeki	5	Shinichiro Akiyama	Ippo Sameshima	Takayuki Suzuki	1:57.6
2018	Triomphe	4	Yutaka Take	Naosuke Sugai	KT Racing	1:56.9
2019	Mer de Glace	4	Yuga Kawada	Hisashi Shimizu	Carrot Farm	1:58.8
2020	R Star	5	Yoshihito Nagaoka	Haruki Sugiyama	KR Japan	1:57.5
2021	Mozu Nagareboshi	4	Kohei Matsuyama	Yoshiyuki Arakawa	Capital System	1:59.7
2022	Maria Elena	4	Kohei Matsuyama	Naohiro Yoshida	Kaneko Makoto Holdings	1:57.4
2023	Echt	6	Yuga Kawada	Hideyuki Mori	Yu Hirai	1:57.8
2024 (Note: The race took place at Chukyo Racecourse)	Reframing	6	Yuga Kawada	Ippo Sameshima	Manabu Kuriyama	1:56.5 (Note: Course record at Chukyo Racecourse)
2025	England Eyes	5	Fuma Matsuwaka	Shogo Yasuda	Reiko Hara	1:59.9
2026	Zendan Hayabusa	4	Manabu Sakai	Yoshitake Hashida	Masanori Kohama	1:58.0

== Earlier winners ==
- 1965 - Hiro Takakuma
- 1966 - Wakakumo
- 1967 - Toughness
- 1968 - Pero Back
- 1969 - Atlas
- 1970 - Open Tsubame
- 1971 - Kachisu
- 1972 - Y M China
- 1973 - Matsu Kaori
- 1974 - Hoshu Missile
- 1975 - Rokko Ichi
- 1976 - Miyaji Marengo
- 1977 - Bell
- 1978 - Shofu Green
- 1979 - Linen Jo O
- 1980 - Suzuka Shimpu
- 1981 - Lafontaice
- 1982 - Long Words
- 1983 - Snark Arrow
- 1984 - Ogon Takeru
- 1985 - Shadai Chatter
- 1986 - Yakumo Desire
- 1987 - Golden Beauty
- 1988 - President City
- 1989 - Dantsu Miracle
- 1990 - Snow Jet
- 1991 - Nice Nature
- 1992 - Ikuno Dictus
- 1993 - Marubutsu Sunkist
- 1994 - Hokusei Amber
- 1995 - Spring Bamboo
- 1996 - Hishi Natalie
- 1997 - Gaily Eagle
- 1998 - T M Oarashi
- 1999 - Embrasser Moi

== See also ==
- Horse racing in Japan
- List of Japanese flat horse races
