= George Whiting Badman =

- Born: 12 December 1886; Lower Light, South Australia
- Died: 3 September 1953 (aged 66); Adelaide, South Australia
- Known for: business, horse owner and breeder

George Whiting Badman (21 December 1886 – 3 September 1953) was a South Australian business man and horse breeder and owner.

== Business ==
- Angaston Quarries
- X. L. Quarries

== Horse racing ==
=== Breeder ===
- Royal Gem (foaled 1942 in Australia, out of French Gem), a versatile Thoroughbred racehorse that won 23 races ranging from 5 furlongs (1,000 metres) to 12 furlongs (2,400 m). He was later a successful sire in the United States.
- Good Whiskey, 1930 winner of the Australian Steeplechase at Caulfield Racecourse

=== Owner ===
- Aurie's Star (foaled in 1932), (leased for 3 years by G. W. Badman from J. Murphy of Hamley Bridge) a gelding who won 28 of his 89 starts, including the 1937 Newmarket Handicap, the 1937 and 1939 Oakleigh Plate as well as the 1940 Goodwood Handicap.
- French Gem, winner of the 1938 VRC Oaks and dam of Royal Gem
- Royal Gem

== Family ==
Badman was born on 21 Dec 1886 at Lower Light, South Australia.

George Whiting Badman was the son of Joel Badman (1853-1924) and Adelaide Louisa née Whiting (1864-1950)

He married Ivy Clarice Bodey (1891–1966) on 21 Feb 1914 at the residence of J Thorne, Malvern, South Australia, Australia and divorced on 17 December 1920.

He married his second cousin, Rita Isabell Pank (17 September 1887 Adelaide – 4 April 1971 St Georges, South Australia), on 29 January 1923 at Dulwich, South Australia, Australia. She was the daughter of George Thomas Pank (1844-1916) and Mary Emma (formerly Hulbert née Badman). (1847-1925)

Together Rita and George had 2 daughters. Shirley (27 November 1924) & Marie Rita (3 April 1928) Both girls were born at "Rockford" Park Terrace, Wayville, South Australia

Also 2 still born babies. The first unknown b/d 23 Sep 1923 The second stillborn son b/d 18 Apr 1926 Both are buried in West Terrace Cemetery - Sturt, Path 12, Aspect W, Site Number 2

He died in a private hospital in Adelaide on 3 September 1953 at the age of 66.
