= Nishigoshi, Kumamoto =

Dissolved municipality in Kumamoto prefecture, Japan

Nishigōshi (西合志町, Nishigōshi-machi) was a town located in Kikuchi District, Kumamoto Prefecture, Japan.

As of 2003, the town had an estimated population of 28,479 and a density of 1,172.94 persons per km^{2}. The total area was 24.28 km^{2}.

On February 27, 2006, Nishigōshi, along with the former town of Kōshi (also from Kikuchi District), was merged to create the city of Kōshi and no longer exists as an independent municipality.
