= Royal Gem =

Australian Thoroughbred racehorse

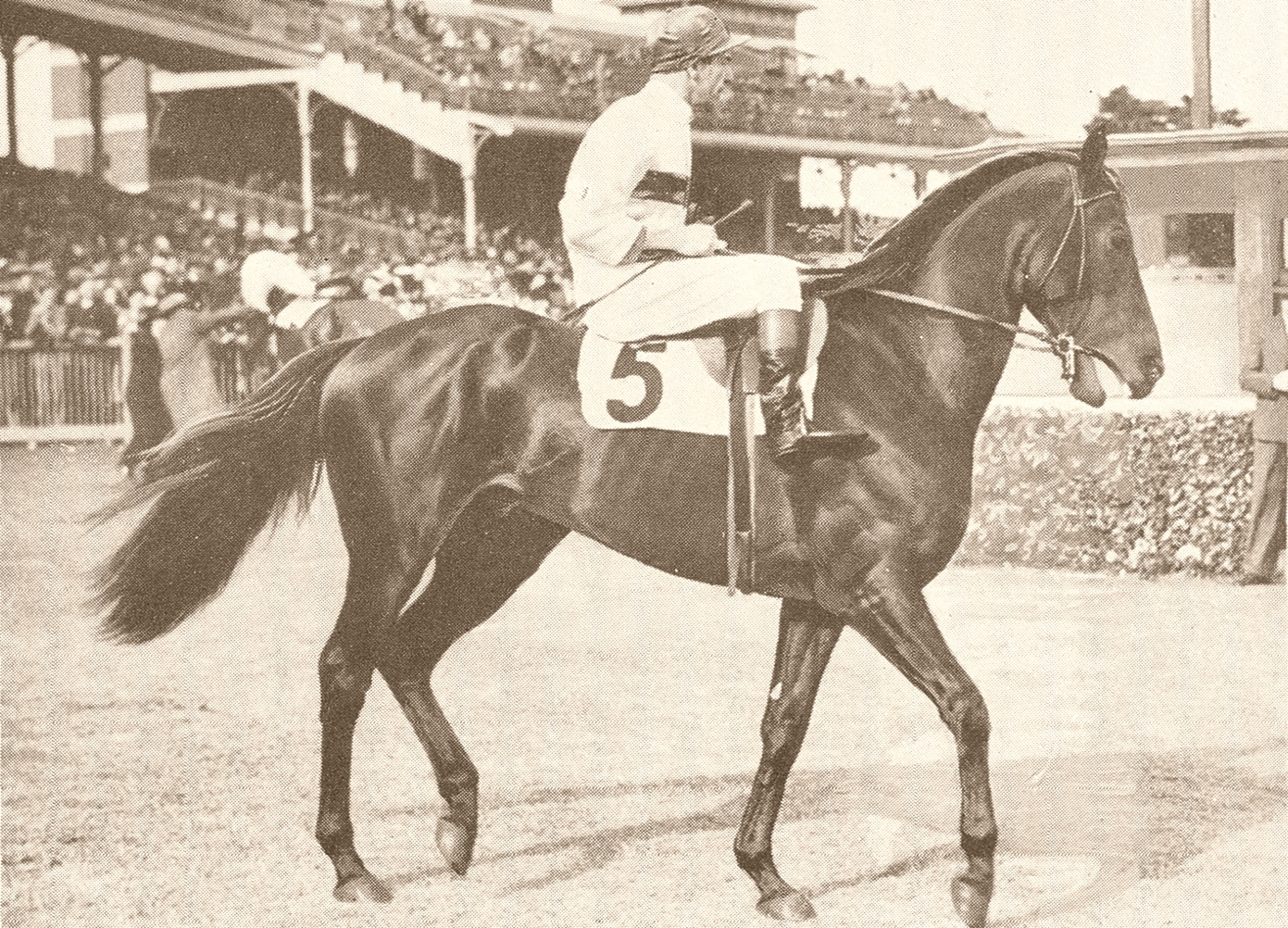
- Sire: Dhoti (GB)
- Grandsire: Dastur
- Dam: French Gem
- Damsire: Beau Fils (GB)
- Sex: Stallion
- Foaled: 1942
- Country: Australia
- Colour: Brown
- Breeder: George W. Badman
- Owner: George W. Badman
- Trainer: George R. Jesser
- Record: 51: 23-8-5
- Earnings: £27,630

Major wins
- Ascot Vale Stakes (1945); Caulfield Guineas (1945); Cantala Stakes (1945); Linlithgow Stakes (1945); Caulfield Cup (1946); Goodwood Handicap (1946); Toorak Handicap (1946); City of Adelaide Stakes (1946, 1948); Futurity Stakes (1948); Newmarket Handicap (1948); Underwood Stakes (1948)

Honours
- Royal Gem Handicap, Caulfield.
- Last updated on 28 May 2010

Royal Gem (foaled 1942 in Australia) was a versatile Thoroughbred racehorse that won 23 races ranging from 5 furlongs (1,000 metres) to 12 furlongs (2,400 m). He was later a successful sire in the United States.

== Breeding ==
He was a brown stallion by the good racehorse and sire, Dhoti (GB) from French Gem, (a winner of five races in Melbourne including the 1938 VRC Oaks), by Beau Fils (GB). French Gem was the dam of 5 stakes-winners which had 23 stakes-wins. Her other stakes-winners were:

- Solar Gem by Helios (GB), won PARC Sires Produce Stakes
- Regal Gem by Dhoti, won SAJC Sires' Produce Stakes
- Beau Gem by Helios, won Victoria Derby, Underwood Stakes (twice), Adelaide RC South Aust. St. Leger Stakes, VRC Turnbull Stakes, Adelaide RC Parkside Stakes, exported to America
- Crown Gem by Dhoti, won Adelaide RC Birthday Cup and other races for £7,008 in stakes.

Royal Gem was inbred to Son-in-Law in the third generation of his pedigree (3x3).

=== 1948 racebook ===
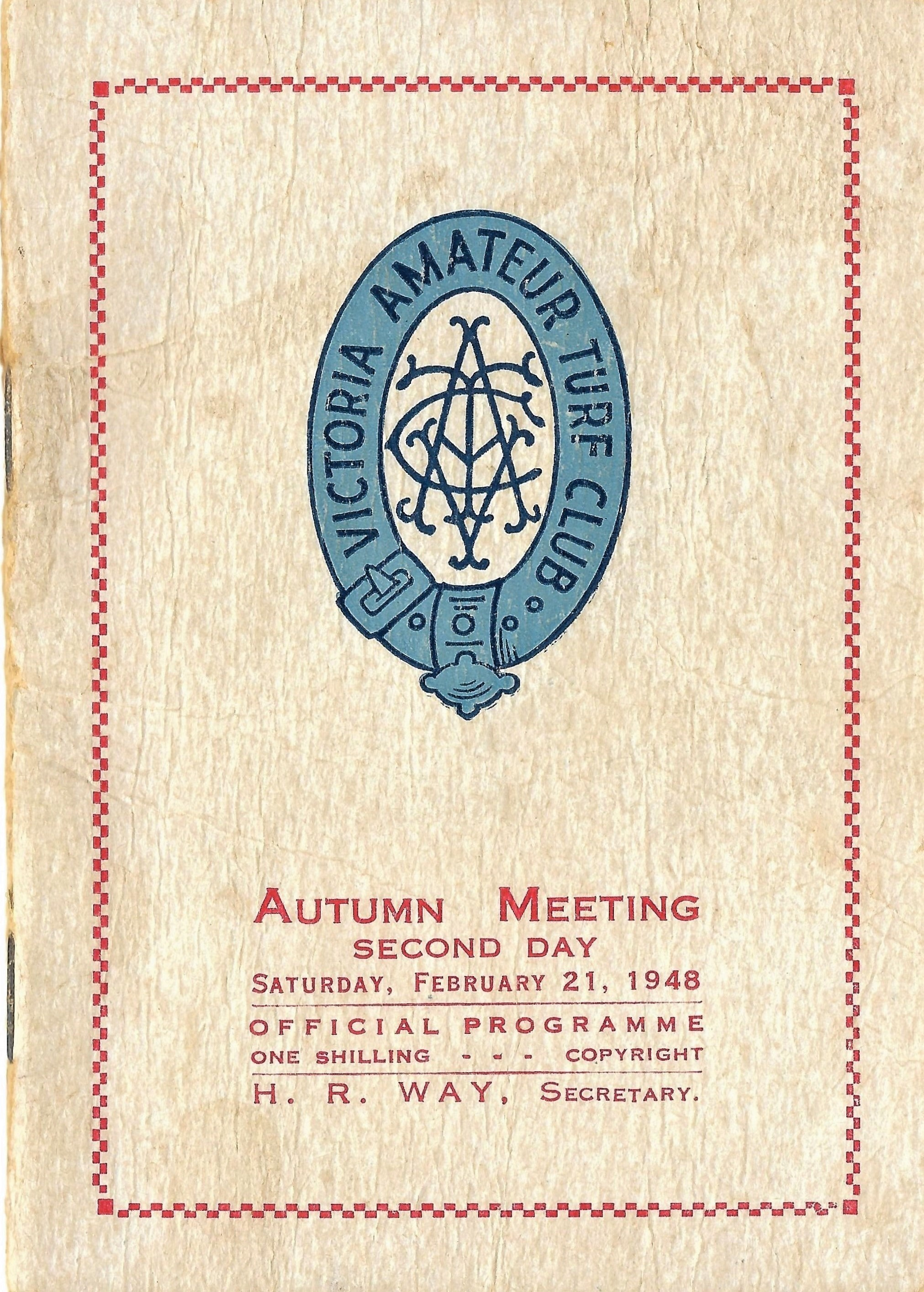
1948 VATC Futurity Stakes racebook front cover

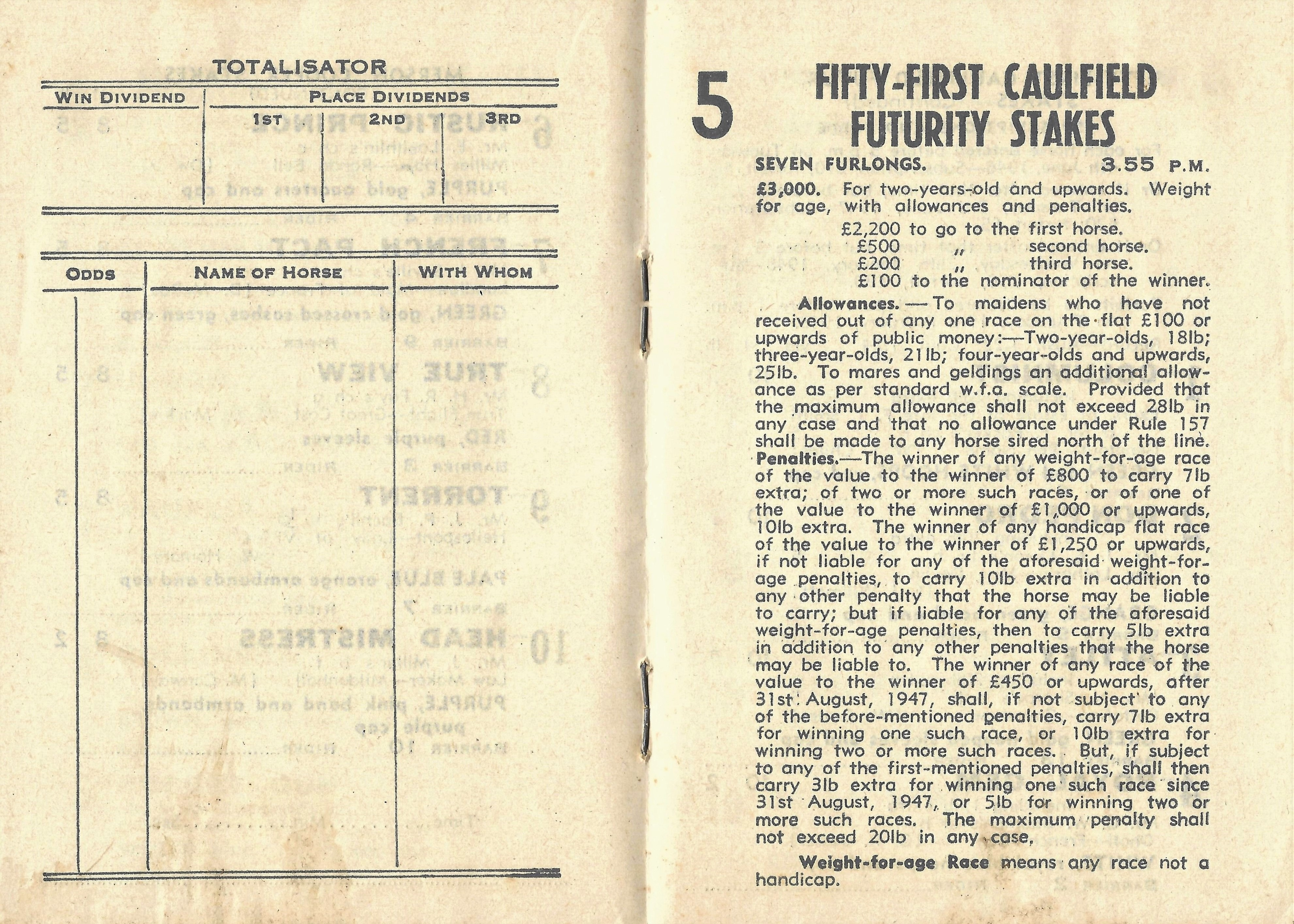
1948 VATC Futurity Stakes showing race conditions

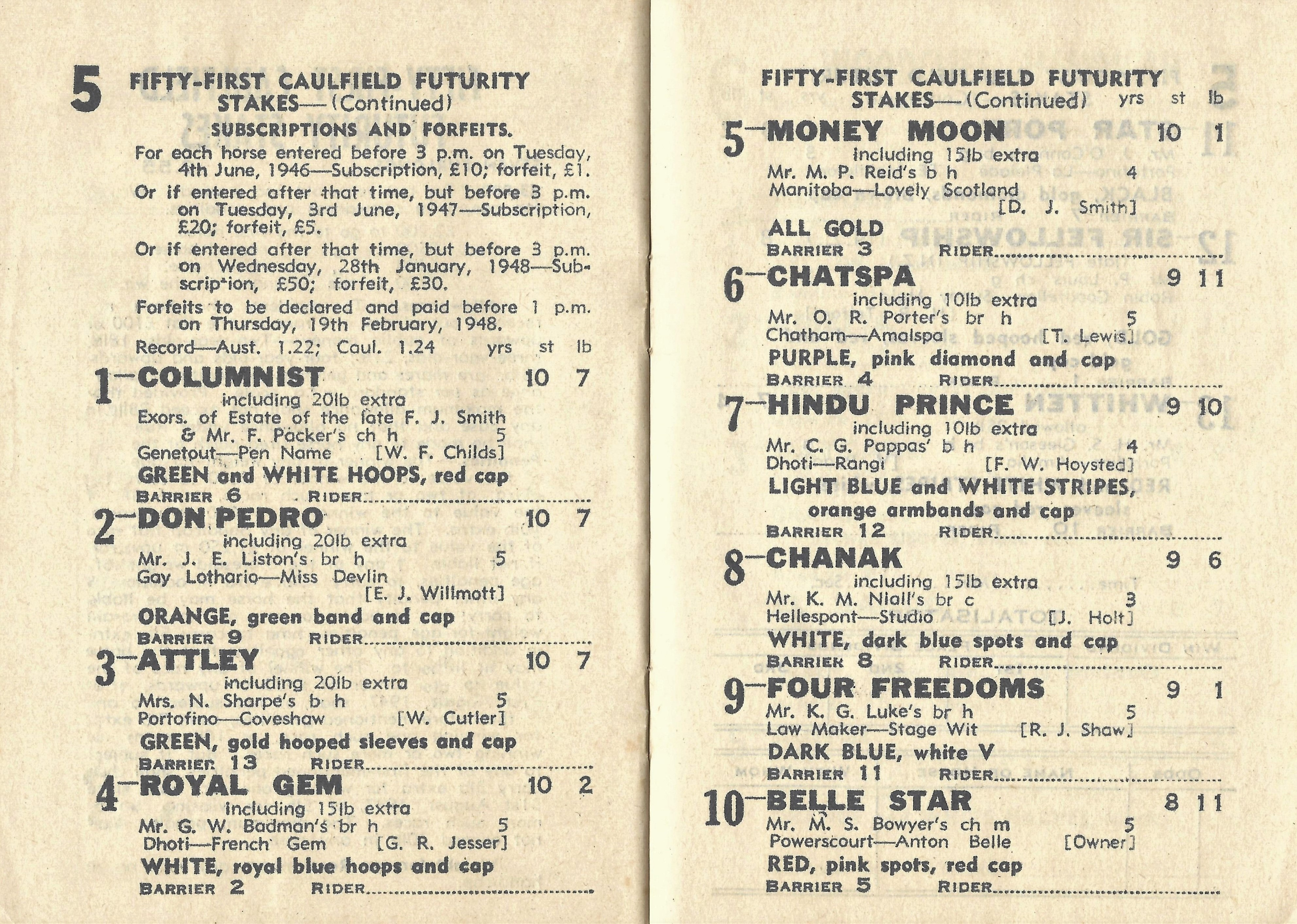
1948 VATC Futurity Stakes starters and results showing the winner, Royal Gem

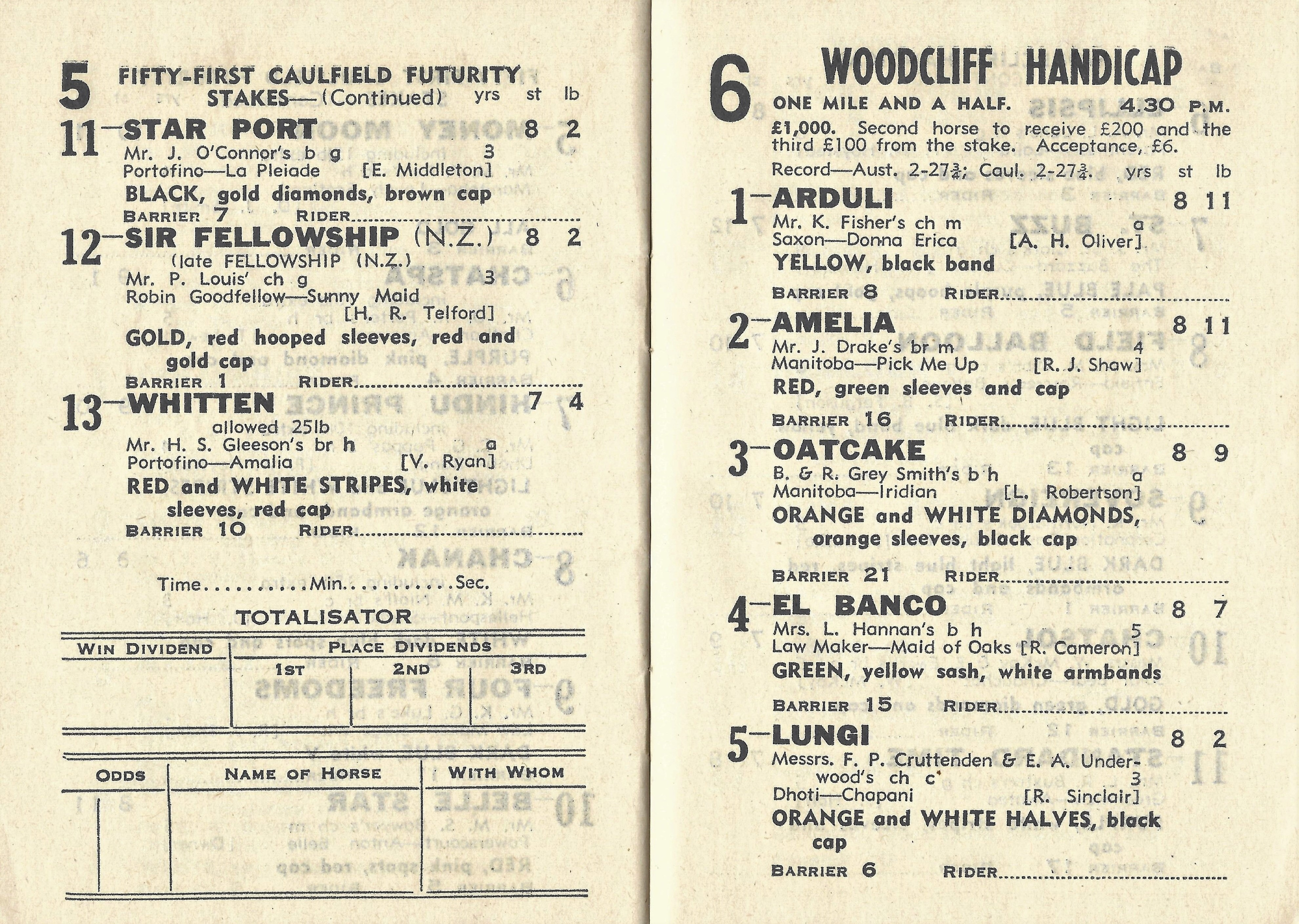
1948 VATC Futurity Stakes starters and results

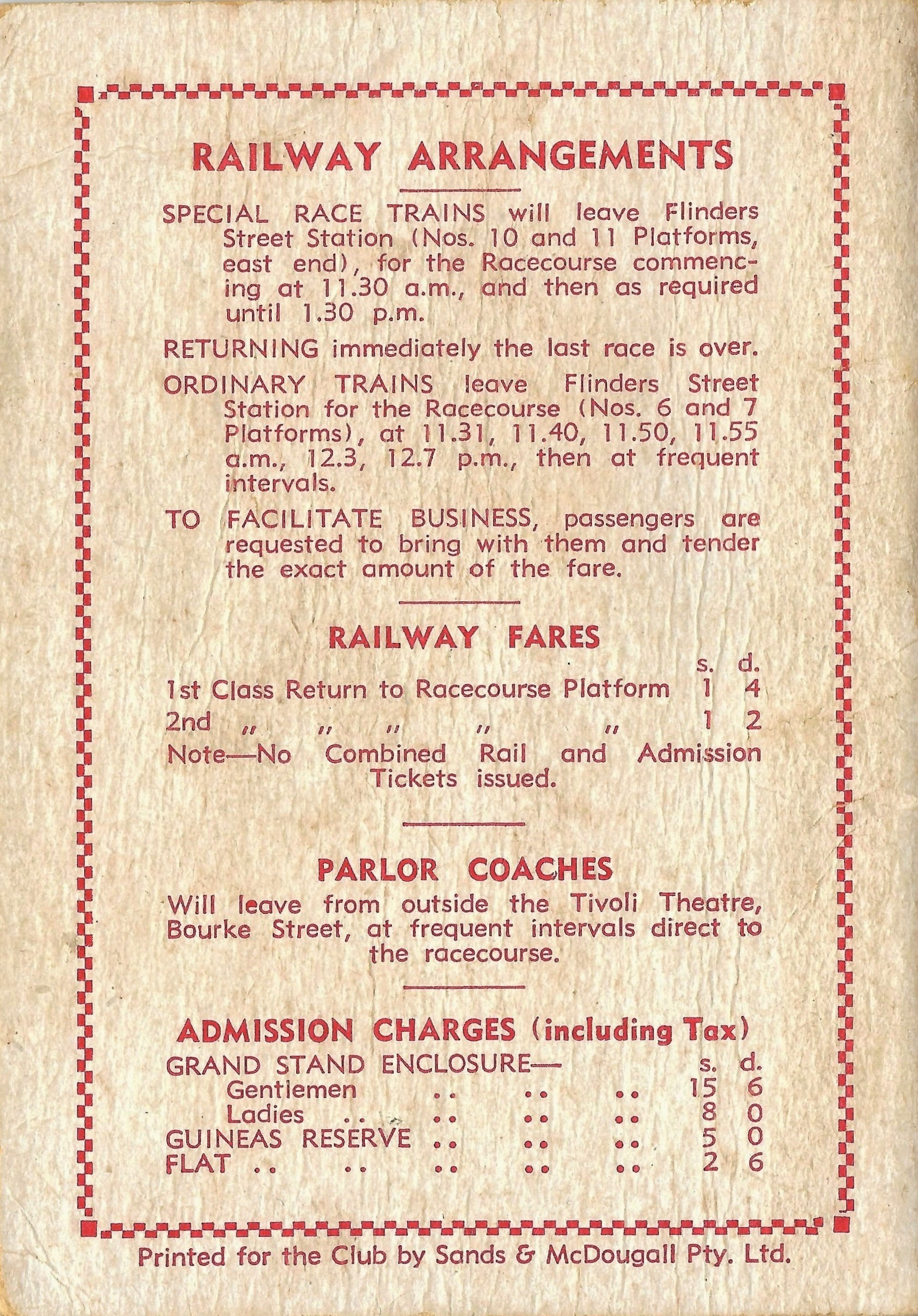
Back cover showing entrance gate and railway charges

== Stakes races ==
=== At two-years: 1944–1945 ===
Five wins including the Ascot Vale Stakes (2yo) over six furlongs.

=== At three-years: 1945–1946 ===
Eight wins including the

- 1945 VATC Caulfield Guineas, eight furlongs, in a dead heat with Attley
- 1945 Cantala Stakes, eight furlongs
- 1945 Linlithgow Stakes, eight furlongs (defeating Attley and Tranquil Star)
- 1946 Adelaide City Handicap (carrying 9 st. 8 lb [61 kg])
- 1946 SAJC Sir Willoughby Norrie Stakes (wfa) 10 furlongs (dead heat with Brazen Jester)
- 1946 SAJC Goodwood Handicap, six furlongs.

=== At four-years: 1946–1947 ===
Four wins including the

- 1946 Caulfield Cup 12 furlongs
- 1946 VATC Toorak Handicap 8 furlongs

Royal Gem's biggest win was the 1946 Caulfield Cup with nine stone (57 kg). However, this win was overshadowed by the controversy surrounding the defeat of the champion Bernborough who had won his previous 15 races and then conceded 11 kg to Royal Gem, to finish fifth in this race. It was reported that Royal Gem's owner, George W. Badman, won £30,000 by backing his horse to win the race.

=== At five-years: 1947–1948 ===
Five wins including the

- 1948 Adelaide City Handicap with 10 stone 5 lbs.
- 1948 VRC Newmarket Handicap, six furlongs (1,200 m) carrying nine stone nine pounds;
- 1948 Futurity Stakes over seven furlongs (1,400m) with 10 stone 2 pounds

The fact Royal Gem won the Futurity Stakes over seven furlongs (1,400m) and Newmarket Handicap over six furlongs (1,200 m) after his Caulfield Cup 12 furlongs (2,400 m) win proved his versatility.

=== At six-years: 1948–1949 ===
One win, 1948 MRC Underwood Stakes over eight furlongs. Royal Gem carrying 11 stone (70 kg) was also second to Chatter Lad, 7 st 12 lbs (50 kg), in the SAJC Warradale Handicap.

Often asked to carry big weights by the handicappers, he had raced for five seasons starting 51 times for 23 wins, 8 seconds and 5 thirds for £27,630 in prize money.

== Stud record ==
Following his six-year-old season Royal Gem was purchased by interests from the United States for £30,000 and brought to stand at stud at Warner Jones, Jr.'s Hermitage Farm in Kentucky. There, he sired the winners of over a thousand races including the 1953 Kentucky Derby winner Dark Star who in turn sired Hidden Treasure, the 1961 Canadian Horse of the Year. Royal Gem's son, Royal Bay Gem (b. 1950), was a winner of five stakes races in 1953 including the Everglades Stakes and Jersey Stakes for $224,495. Royal Bay Gem also ran third in the Preakness and Belmont Stakes after finishing fourth to Dark Star in the Kentucky Derby.

Other Royal Gem progeny includes, Precious Stone won $110,861; Royal Spirit, won in Canada the Duchess Stakes (twice), E.P.Taylor Stakes and Summer Stakes. Its Ann won in Canada the Highlander Stakes and Rose's Gem won $230,964.

The Royal Gem Handicap for three-year-olds run over 1,000 metres at Caulfield is named in honour of Royal Gem.

== Sire line tree ==
- Royal Gem
  - Dark Star
    - Hidden Treasure
    - Iron Peg
    - My Dad George
  - Precious Stone
  - Royal Bay Gem
