= Mikio Matsunaga =

Retired Japanese jockey and current racehorse trainer

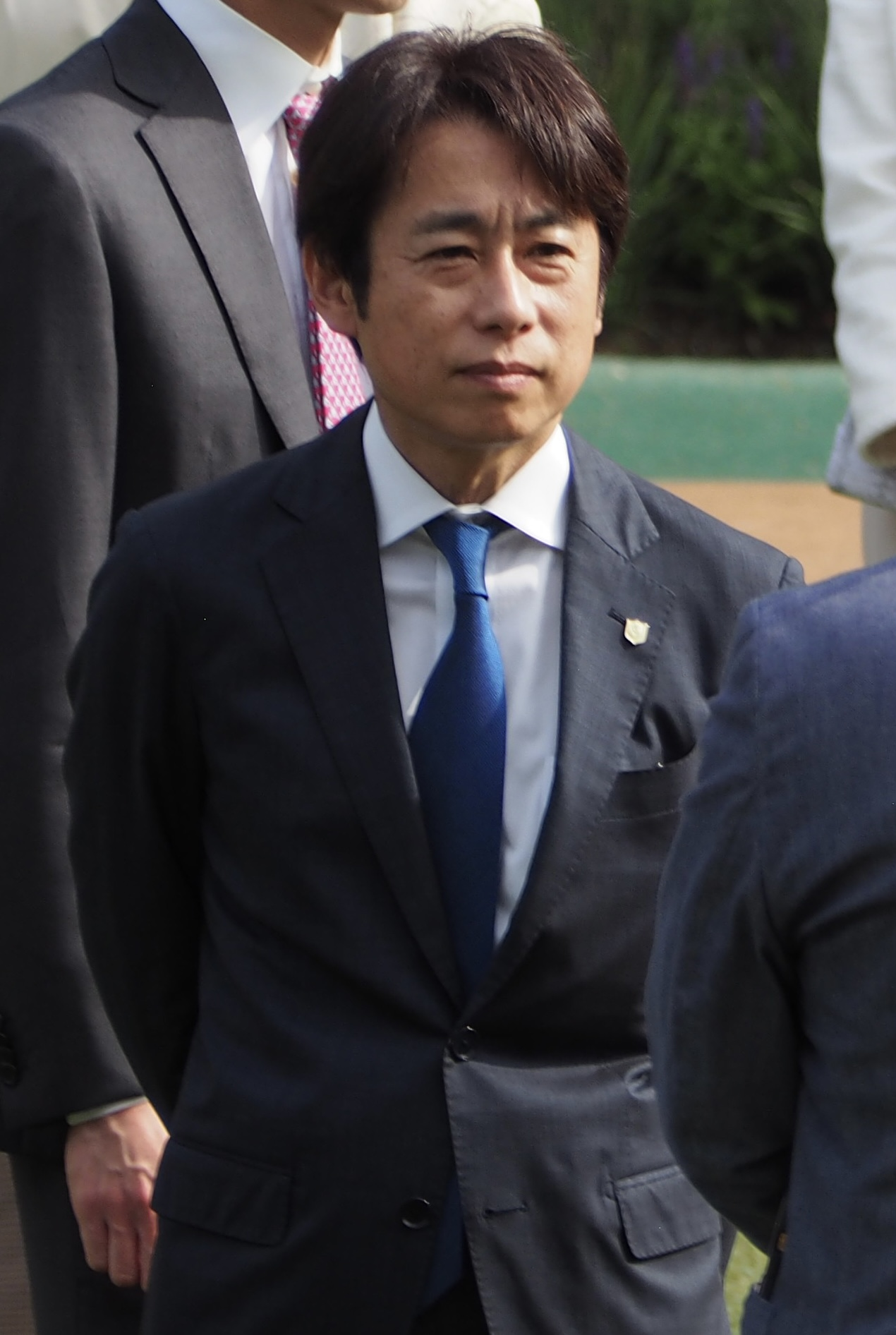
- Matsunaga in 2023

Personal information
- Native name: 松永幹夫
- Born: April 10, 1967 (age 59) Nishigoshi, Kumamoto, Japan

Horse racing career
- Sport: Horse racing

Mikio Matsunaga (松永幹夫) is a Japanese former jockey and horse trainer.

On June 20, 2021, his horse Gran Approuso came in first in the fifth race at Sapporo Racecourse, achieving his 400th JRA win.
