= Ontario Matron Stakes =

Canadian Race for Mares & Fillies held annually in Ontario

- Class: Grace III
- Location: Woodbine Racetrack; Toronto, Ontario, Canada
- Inaugurated: 1979
- Race type: Thoroughbred - Flat racing
- Website: www.woodbineentertainment.com/qct/default.asp

Race information
- Distance: 1 1/16 miles (8.5 furlongs)
- Surface: Polytrack
- Track: left-handed
- Qualification: Fillies & Mares, three-years-old & up
- Weight: Weight-For-Age
- Purse: $115,635 (2016)
- Bonuses: $50,000 for Ontario-bred horses from the T.I.P.

The Ontario Matron Stakes is a Canadian Thoroughbred horse race run annually at Woodbine Racetrack in Toronto, Ontario. Held during the third week of July, it is open to fillies and mares, age three and older. Once an ungraded stakes, it is now a Grade III and raced over a distance of 1 1/16 miles on Polytrack synthetic dirt, the race currently offers a purse of $115,635 with an addition $50,000 for Ontario bred horses from the Ontario Thoroughbred Improvement Program (T.I.P.).

The Ontario Matron Stakes was first run in 1979. Until 2006 it was known as the Ontario Matron Handicap.

== Records ==
Speed record: (Through 1998, Woodbine times were recorded in fifths of a second. Since 1999 they are in hundredths of a second)

- 1:42.94 - Kate's Kingdom (2022)

Most wins:

- 2 - La Voyageuse (1979, 1980)
- 2 - Spanish Play (1990, 1991)
- 2 - Santa Amelia (1997, 1998)
- 2 - One For Rose (2004, 2005)

Most wins by an owner:

- 3 - Tucci Stables (2004, 2005, 2006)
- 3 Augustin Stable (1997, 1998, 2019)

Most wins by a jockey:

- 6 - Todd Kabel (1995, 1996, 1998, 1999, 2001, 2003)

Most wins by a trainer:

- 5 - Roger Attfield (1987, 1992, 1994, 2002, 2015)

== Winners ==
| Year | Winner | Age | Jockey | Trainer | Owner | Time |
|---|---|---|---|---|---|---|
| 2026 | Lupa (IRE) | 4 | Fraser Aebly | Joise Carroll | Mark Dodson | 1:43.38 |
| 2025 | Caitlinhergrtness | 4 | Flavien Prat | Kevin Attard | WinStar Farm LLC | 1:42.92 |
| 2024 | Fashionably Fab | 4 | David Moran | Kevin Attard | Terra Racing Stable | 1:43.84 |
| 2023 | Millie Girl | 5 | Rafael Manuel Hernandez | Catherine Day Phillips | Kingfield Racing Stable Ltd, Braconcrest Inc. and Apricot Valley Thoroughbreds | 1:41.96 |
| 2022 | Kate's Kingdom | 4 | Antonio A. Gallardo | Armando De la cerda | Stephen Screnci | 1:41.94 |
| 2021 | Art Of Almost | 5 | Emma-Jayne Wilson | Mark Casse | D J Stable | 1:43.99 |
| 2020 | Not run due to the COVID-19 pandemic | | | | | |
| 2019 | Pamina | 4 | Luis Contreras | Michael Dickinson | Augustin Stable | 1:42.42 |
| 2018 | Gamble's Ghost | 5 | Eurico Rosa da Silva | Josie Carroll | Ivan Dalos | 1:44.88 |
| 2017 | Ami's Mesa | 4 | Luis Contreras | Josie Carroll | Ivan Dalos | 1:43.44 |
| 2016 | Midnight Miley | 4 | Rafael Manuel Hernandez | Julia Carey | Little Red Feather Racing | 1:43.74 |
| 2015 | Uchenna (IRE) | 4 | Alan Garcia | Roger L. Attfield | Triton Racing | 1:43.74 |
| 2014 | La Tia | 5 | Justin Stein | Armando De la cerda | Salvador Hernandez | 1:42.70 |
| 2013 | Sisterly Love | 5 | Eurico Rosa Da Silva | Mark E. Casse | Gary Barber | 1:43.41 |
| 2012 | Stars to Shine | 5 | Alex Solis | Mark R. Frostad | Grange House Partnership | 1:45.04 |
| 2011 | Embur's Song | 3 | Patrick Husbands | Todd A. Pletcher | Fares Farm | 1:43.39 |
| 2010 | La Rocca | 4 | James McAleney | Terry Jordan | Peter Redekop | 1:45.63 |
| 2009 | Smart Surprise | 5 | Patrick Husbands | Josie Carroll | Hill 'n' Dale Equine Holdings | 1:43.55 |
| 2008 | Bear Now | 4 | Jerry Baird | Reade Baker | Bear Stables | 1:42.85 |
| 2007 | She's Indy Money | 4 | Garrett Gomez | Malcolm Pierce | Live Oak Plantation | 1:44.22 |
| 2006 | Miss Concerto | 5 | Emma-Jayne Wilson | Sid C. Attard | Tucci Stables | 1:45.52 |
| 2005 | One For Rose | 6 | Emile Ramsammy | Sid C. Attard | Tucci Stables | 1:45.28 |
| 2004 | One For Rose | 5 | Emile Ramsammy | Sid C. Attard | Tucci Stables | 1:44.22 |
| 2003 | Winning Chance | 4 | Todd Kabel | Daniel J. Vella | Stronach Stables | 1:43.72 |
| 2002 | Extend | 4 | David Clark | Roger Attfield | Cam Allard | 1:43.67 |
| 2001 | Mountain Angel | 4 | Todd Kabel | Mark Frostad | Sam-Son Farm | 1:44.36 |
| 2000 | Masada | 4 | Neil Poznansky | Thomas O'Keefe | Wings of Erin Farm | 1:44.04 |
| 1999 | Kirby's Song | 4 | Todd Kabel | Tino Attard | Kirby Canada Farm | 1:43.69 |
| 1998 | Santa Amelia | 6 | Todd Kabel | Macdonald Benson | Augustin Stable | 1:43.80 |
| 1997 | Santa Amelia | 5 | Jesus Bracho | Macdonald Benson | Augustin Stable | 1:45.20 |
| 1996 | Stellarina | 5 | Todd Kabel | Daniel J. Vella | Frank Stronach | 1:44.80 |
| 1995 | Holly Regent | 4 | Todd Kabel | Sam DiPasquale | Peter DiPasquale | 1:44.20 |
| 1994 | Pennyhill Park | 4 | Robert Landry | Roger Attfield | Anderson Farms et al. | 1:43.60 |
| 1993 | Dance For Donna | 4 | Robert Landry | Sherry Noakes | Aubrey W. Minshall | 1:43.40 |
| 1992 | A Gal For Gordo | 4 | Don Seymour | Roger Attfield | Tibor Bankuti/Larson | 1:45.80 |
| 1991 | Spanish Play | 5 | Robin Platts | Frank Huarte | Frank Huarte | 1:45.00 |
| 1990 | Spanish Play | 4 | Robin Platts | Frank Huarte | Frank Huarte | 1:46.00 |
| 1989 | Anglia | 5 | David Clark | Norm Smith | Golden Willow Farm | 1:44.40 |
| 1988 | Chateau D'lrlande | 4 | Don Seymour | D. Lockhurst | Sunlight Farm | 1:45.40 |
| 1987 | Triple Wow | 4 | Don Seymour | Roger Attfield | Kinghaven Farms | 1:44.40 |
| 1986 | Bessarabian | 4 | Robin Platts | Mike Doyle | Eaton Hall Farm | 1:45.20 |
| 1985 | Sinister Spinster | 4 | Larry Attard | George M. Carter | Bonnie Acres Farm | 1:44.80 |
| 1984 | Miksamjoe | 5 | Robert King, Jr. | Frank Passero, Jr. | M. S. & J. Passero, Jr. | 1:47.20 |
| 1983 | Eternal Search | 5 | Lloyd Duffy | Janet Bedford | Jim Dandy Stable | 1:43.80 |
| 1982 | Sharons Fare Well | 5 | Larry Attard | Sid C. Attard | Tom Campbell | 1:47.20 |
| 1981 | Turnablade | 4 | George HoSang | Tony Mattine | John Sikura, Jr. | 1:44.40 |
| 1980 | La Voyageuse | 5 | J. Paul Souter | Yonnie Starr | Jean-Louis Levesque | 1:44.80 |
| 1979 | La Voyageuse | 4 | J. Paul Souter | Yonnie Starr | Jean-Louis Levesque | 1:45.20 |

== See also ==
- List of Canadian flat horse races
