= Junius (horse) =

American-bred Thoroughbred racehorse

- Sire: Raja Baba
- Grandsire: Bold Ruler
- Dam: Solid Thought
- Damsire: Solidarity
- Sex: Stallion
- Foaled: 15 March 1976
- Country: United States
- Colour: Bay or Brown
- Breeder: Warner L. Jones Jr.
- Owner: Simon Fraser
- Trainer: Vincent O'Brien
- Record: 5: 3-1-0

Major wins
- Middle Park Stakes (1978)

Awards
- Timeform rating 124 (1978)

Junius (15 March 1976 – 1997) was an American-bred, Irish-trained Thoroughbred racehorse and sire. After fetching a price of $300,000 as a yearling he was sent to race in Europe where he had his greatest success as a two-year-old in 1978. Following a narrow defeat on his debut he won twice in Ireland before traveling to England and winning the Group One Middle Park Stakes in record time. He failed on his only appearance in the following year and was retired from racing. He stood as a breeding stallion in Ireland and Japan but had little impact as a sire of winners.

== Background ==
Junius was a "neat" brown horse with a white blaze and three white socks bred in Kentucky by Warner L. Jones Jr. He was from the third crop of foals sired by the American sprinter Raja Baba whose other offspring included Summer Mood, Sacahuista and Is It True. Junius's dam, Solid Thought was a high-class racemare who won the Santa Ynez Stakes and the Honeymoon Handicap in 1960. She produced several other winner including Gentle Thoughts. Solid Thought was a descendant of the broodmare Traverse, making her a distant relative of Hasty Road, Bold Bidder and Intrepidity.

As a yearling Junius was offered for sale and bought for $300,000. The colt entered the ownership of Simon Fraser and was sent to Europe where he was trained by Vincent O'Brien at Ballydoyle.

== Racing career ==
=== 1978: two-year-old season ===
On his racecourse debut, Junius started at odds of 1/3 in a minor race over five furlongs but was beaten a short head into second place. At the Curragh in September he was opposed by eleven horses in a six furlong maiden race and accelerated clear of his rivals to win by four lengths from Rare Duke. Two weeks later, over the same course and distance, Junius won the Suir Plate, beating the previously unraced Pittsville by half a length.

For his final appearance of the season Junius was sent to England and moved up to Group One level for the Middle Park Stakes over six furlongs at Newmarket Racecourse on 5 October. He was his trainer's first juvenile runner in Britain that year and started at odds of 7/1 in a ten-runner field. Main Reef, who had been disqualified after finishing first in the Mill Reef Stakes, started favourite, whilst the other contenders included Stanford (Gimcrack Stakes), Young Generation (Richmond Stakes) and King of Spain (awarded the Mill Reef Stakes). Ridden by Lester Piggott, Junius disputed second place as Main Reef set the early pace, before going to the front at half way. He got the better of a sustained struggle with Young Generation before drawing ahead to win by a length. The winning time 1:11.0 was a new course record for a two-year-old.

=== 1979: three-year-old season ===
In April 1979 Junius started odds on favourite in a six-runner field for the Tetrarch Stakes over seven furlongs at the Curragh. He appeared unsuited by the soft ground and finished a well-beaten fifth behind Gerald Martin. He never raced again and was retired at the end of the year.

== Assessment ==
In the official International Classification of European two-year-olds for 1978 was given a rating of 85, placing him joint sixth behind Tromos, Irish River, Sigy, Ela-Mana-Mou and Sandy Creek. The independent Timeform organisation gave Junius a rating of 124, ten pounds behind Tromos who was their top-rated juvenile.

== Stud record ==
After the end of his racing career Junius became a breeding stallion at the Corbally Stud in County Kildare in 1980. He was exported to Japan in 1984. The best of his offspring was Come Summer who won the 1986 Clark Handicap whilst his other progeny included Soluce, who won the Leopardstown 1,000 Guineas Trial Stakes in 1984. Although he remained at stud in Japan until 1997 he sired few foals after 1989 and none at all after 1992.

== Pedigree ==
Pedigree of Junius (USA), bay or brown stallion, 1976
Sire Raja Baba (USA) 1968	Bold Ruler (USA); 1954	Nasrullah	Nearco
Sire Raja Baba (USA) 1968	Bold Ruler (USA); 1954	Nasrullah	Mumtaz Begum
Sire Raja Baba (USA) 1968	Bold Ruler (USA); 1954	Miss Disco	Discovery
Sire Raja Baba (USA) 1968	Bold Ruler (USA); 1954	Miss Disco	Outdone
Sire Raja Baba (USA) 1968	Missy Baba (USA); 1958	My Babu	Djebel
Sire Raja Baba (USA) 1968	Missy Baba (USA); 1958	My Babu	Perfume
Sire Raja Baba (USA) 1968	Missy Baba (USA); 1958	Uvira	Umidwar
Sire Raja Baba (USA) 1968	Missy Baba (USA); 1958	Uvira	Lady Lawless
Dam Solid Thought (USA) 1957	Solidarity (USA); 1945	Alibhai	Hyperion
Dam Solid Thought (USA) 1957	Solidarity (USA); 1945	Alibhai	Teresina
Dam Solid Thought (USA) 1957	Solidarity (USA); 1945	Jerrybuilt	Empire Builder
Dam Solid Thought (USA) 1957	Solidarity (USA); 1945	Jerrybuilt	Varnish
Dam Solid Thought (USA) 1957	Unforgettable (USA); 1951	Burning Dream	Bimelech
Dam Solid Thought (USA) 1957	Unforgettable (USA); 1951	Burning Dream	By Mistake
Dam Solid Thought (USA) 1957	Unforgettable (USA); 1951	Cantadora	Case Ace
Dam Solid Thought (USA) 1957	Unforgettable (USA); 1951	Cantadora	Comeover (Family:3-n)
