= Canadian Champion Older Female Horse =

The Canadian Champion Older Female Horse is a Canadian Thoroughbred horse racing honour created in 1975 by the Jockey Club of Canada. It is part of the Sovereign Awards program and is awarded annually to the top Thoroughbred Filly four years of age and older competing in Canada. The award was renamed to Champion Older Main Track Female before the 2019 Sovereign Awards.

== Past winners ==
- 1975 : Victorian Queen
- 1976 : Momigi
- 1977 : Reasonable Win
- 1978 : Christy's Mount
- 1979 : La Voyageuse
- 1980 : Glorious Song
- 1981 : Glorious Song
- 1982 : Eternal Search
- 1983 : Eternal Search
- 1984 : Sintrillium
- 1985 : Lake Country
- 1986 : Bessarabian
- 1987 : Carotene
- 1988 : Carotene
- 1989 : Proper Evidence
- 1990 : Diva's Debut
- 1991 : Avant's Gold
- 1992 : Wilderness Song
- 1993 : Dance for Donna
- 1994 : Pennyhill Park
- 1995 : Bold Ruritana
- 1996 : Windsharp
- 1997 : Woolloomooloo
- 1998 : Santa Amelia
- 1999 : Magic Code
- 2000 : Saoirse
- 2001 : Mountain Angel
- 2002 : Small Promises
- 2003 : One For Rose
- 2004 : One For Rose
- 2005 : One For Rose
- 2006 : Financingavailable
- 2007 : Financingavailable
- 2008 : Bear Now
- 2009 : Serenading
- 2010 : Impossible Time
- 2011 : Embur's Song
- 2012 : Roxy Gap
- 2013 : Sisterly Love
- 2014 : Strut the Course
- 2015 : Miss Mischief
- 2016 : Midnight Miley
- 2017 : Ami's Mesa
- 2018 : Escape Clause
- 2019 : Here's Hannah
- 2020 : Souper Escape
- 2021 : Skygaze
- 2022 : Lady Speightspeare
- 2023 : Millie Girl
- 2024 : Fashionably Fab
