= Eternal Search =

Canadian-bred Thoroughbred racehorse

- Sire: Northern Answer
- Grandsire: Northern Dancer
- Dam: Bon Debarras
- Damsire: Ruritania
- Sex: Filly
- Foaled: 1978
- Country: Canada
- Colour: Dark Bay/Brown
- Breeder: North American Bloodstock Agency
- Owner: Jim Dandy Stable
- Trainer: Ted Mann
- Record: 44: 18-11-2
- Earnings: Can$642,177

Major wins
- Kingarvie Stakes (1980); Duchess Stakes (1981); La Prevoyante Stakes (1981); Ontario Colleen Stakes (1981); Ontario Damsel Stakes (1981); Ontario Fashion Stakes (1981); Belle Mahone Stakes (1982); Maple Leaf Stakes (1982); Nassau Stakes (1982, 1983); Seaway Stakes (1982); Victoriana Stakes (1982, 1983); Whimsical Stakes (1982); Ontario Matron Stakes (1983)

Awards
- Canadian Champion Sprint Horse (1981); Canadian Champion Older Female Horse (1982, 1983)

Honours
- Eternal Search Stakes at Woodbine Racetrack
- Last updated on February 25, 2010

Eternal Search (1978–2007) was a Canadian Champion Thoroughbred racehorse foaled in Ontario.

Purchased at age two for $50,000 by Mel Lawson who raced her under his Jim Dandy Stable banner, she was trained by Canadian Horse Racing Hall of Fame inductee, Ted Mann. The winner of numerous stakes races on both dirt and turf from age two through five, Eternal Search was voted a Sovereign Award as the Canadian Champion Sprinter for 1981 and twice as Canadian Campion Older Mare in 1982 and 1983.

Afflicted with cancer, Eternal Search was euthanized at age twenty-nine in late June 2007 at Curraghmore Farm near Waterdown, Ontario.
