= One for Rose =

Canadian-bred Thoroughbred racehorse

One For Rose
- Sire: Tejano Run
- Grandsire: Tejano
- Dam: Saucyladygaylord
- Damsire: Lord Gaylord
- Sex: Mare
- Foaled: 1999
- Country: Canada
- Colour: Dark Bay/Brown
- Breeder: Hill 'n' Dale Farms
- Owner: Tucci Stables
- Trainer: Sid C. Attard
- Record: 27: 15-5-2
- Earnings: Can$1,380,298

Major wins
- Algoma Stakes (2003, 2004, 2005); Maple Leaf Stakes (2003, 2004); Ontario Matron Handicap (2004, 2005); Seagram Cup Stakes (2004, 2005)

Awards
- Canadian Champion Older Female Horse (2003, 2004, 2005)

Honours
- Canadian Horse Racing Hall of Fame (2026)

One For Rose (foaled 1999 in Ontario) is a Canadian three-time Champion Thoroughbred racehorse. On October 4, 2002, with little success in racing at nearly four years of age, One For Rose was claimed for $40,000 by trainer Sid Attard for Lou and Carlo Tucci's racing stable. Under trainer Attard, the filly blossomed in 2003 and earned the first of her three consecutive Sovereign Awards as the Canadian Champion Older Female Horse. She was retired at the end of the 2005 racing season after having won her third straight running of the Algoma Stakes, her second straight Ontario Matron Handicap and having beaten her male counterparts in her second straight victory in the Seagram Cup Stakes.

Sent to the January 2006 Keeneland Sales, One For Rose was sold as a broodmare prospect to Isami Nakamura of Japan for US$875,000.
