= Ontario Fashion Stakes =

- Class: Grade III Stakes
- Location: Woodbine Racetrack; Toronto, Ontario, Canada
- Inaugurated: 1979
- Race type: Thoroughbred - Flat racing
- Website: www.woodbineentertainment.com

Race information
- Distance: Six furlong sprint
- Surface: Polytrack
- Track: left-handed
- Qualification: Fillies & Mares, Three-Years-Old & Up
- Weight: Assigned
- Purse: $135,000 (Plus $50,000 for Ontario Breds from the T.I.P.)

The Ontario Fashion Stakes is a Canadian Thoroughbred horse race run annually since 1979 at Woodbine Racetrack in Toronto, Ontario. Run in early November, the event is open to Fillies and mares age three and older and is contested over six furlongs on Polytrack synthetic dirt.

Financingavailable holds the race record at 1:08.56 run in 2007.

It is a Grade 3 race as of 2022.

== Records ==
Speed Record

- 1:08.38 – Hazelbrook (2022)

Most Wins

- 2 – La Voyageuse (1979, 1980)
- 2 – Summer Mood (1984, 1985)
- 2 – Bimini Blues (1997, 1998)
- 2 – Feathers (2001, 2002)
- 2 – Winter Garden (2003, 2004)
- 2 – Atlantic Hurricane (2011, 2012)

Most wins by a jockey

- 4 – Eurico Rosa da Silva (2005, 2006, 2016, 2019)

Most wins by a trainer

- 4 – Roger Attfield (1983, 1985, 1993, 2000)

Most wins by an owner

- 4 – Kinghaven Farms (1984, 1985, 1993, 2000)

== Winners ==
Year	Winner	Jockey	Trainer	Owner	Time
2026	Quadruple (GB)	Ryan Munger	Josie Carroll	Mark Dodson	1:09.42
2025	Les Reys (FR)	Rafael Manuel Hernandez	Miguel Clement	West Point Thoroughbreds, Peter Leidel and Winters Equine LLC	1:10.42
2024	A Game	Fraser Aebly	Josie Carroll	Mark Dodson	1:09.49
2023	Spun Glass	Luis Contreras	Michael J. Trombetta	R. Larry Johnson	1:08.64
2022	Hazelbrook	Jason Hoyte	Lorne Richards	True North Stable	1:08.38
2021	Amalfi Coast	Justin Stein	Kevin Attard	Terra Racing Stable	1:09.40
2020	Painting	Patrick Husbands	Josie Carroll	Hill 'n' Dale Farms, Windsor Boys Racing & Glenn Sikura	1:09.46
2019	Jean Elizabeth	Eurico Rosa da Silva	Larry Rivelli	Patricia's Hope LLC, Larry Rivelli, & Richard Ravin	1:09.26
2018	Silent Sonet	David Moran	Nicholas Gonzalez	Ivan Dalos	1:08.77
2017	Moonlit Promise	Gary Boulanger	Josie Carroll	Hill 'n' Dale Farms	1:09.06
2016	Southern Ring	Eurico Rosa da Silva	Malcolm Pierce	Malcolm Pierce	1:08.65
2015	Cactus Kris	Huber Villa-Gomez	Ryan D.Walsh	Annie L. Walsh	1:10.06
2014	Native Bombshell	Patrick Husbands	Chad C. Brown	Michael Dubb, The Elkstone Group, Bethleham Stables & David A. Ross Racing Stables	1:09.48
2013	Youcan'tcatchme	Justin Stein	Sam Di Pasquale	Murray Stroud	1:10.15
2012	Atlantic Hurricane	Luis Contreras	Stuart C. Simon	Stuart C. Simon	1:09.57
2011	Atlantic Hurricane	Emile Ramsammy	Stuart C. Simon	Stuart C. Simon	1:09.23
2010	Indian Apple Is	Chantal Sutherland	Robert P. Tiller	Robert P. Tiller	1:09.76
2009	Tribel Belle	James McAleney	Terry Jordan	Canvasback Farms	1:08.84
2008	Porte Bonheur	Channing Hill	David P. Duggan	Johanna Murphy	1:08.64
2007	Financingavailable	James McAleney	Lorne Richards	K. K. Sangara	1:08.56
2006	Shot Gun Ela	Eurico Rosa da Silva	Ross Armata	Annecchini and D'Alimonte Holdings, Inc.	1:11.79
2005	Colonial Surprise	Eurico Rosa da Silva	Nickolas De Toro	Nickolas De Toro	1:10.89
2004	Winter Garden	David Clark	Robert P. Tiller	Frank D. Di Giulio Jr.	1:10.35
2003	Winter Garden	David Clark	Robert P. Tiller	Frank D. Di Giulio Jr.	1:10.59
2002	Feathers	James McKnight	Ralph J Biamonte	Tooth and Nail Stable	1:10.82
2001	Feathers	Mickey Walls	Ralph J Biamonte	Tooth and Nail Stable	1:11.11
2000	Torrid Affair	Robert C. Landry	Roger Attfield	Kinghaven Farms	1:10.82
1999	Appealing Phylly	Na Somsanith	Thomas R. Bowden	Colebrook Farms	1:10.94
1998	Bimini Blues	Robert C. Landry	Michael Mattine	Theodore F. Burnett	1:10:80
1997	Bimini Blues	Sandy Hawley	Michael Mattine	Theodore F. Burnett	1:10.00
1996	Dial A Song	Larry Attard	Sid C. Attard	Stronach Stables	1:12.20
1995	Countess Steffi	Richard Anthony Dos Ramos	John Charalambous	M. Lieberman, T. Filipowich, & M. Kates	1:10.40
1994	Early Blaze	Lloyd Duffy	Brian Ottaway	Kenneth T. Ham	1:10.40
1993	Sing and Swing	James McAleney	Roger Attfield	Kinghaven Farms	1:10.40
1992	Apelia	Larry Attard	Phillip England	Knob Hill Stable	1:10.00
1991	Illeria	David Penna	Michael J. Doyle	Eaton Hall Farm	1:11.20
1990	Victorious Trick	Jerry Baird	David R. Bell	John Franks	1:10.60
1989	Bientot Gold	Raymond Brian Sabourin	Samuel G. Dixon	Cinnamont Stable & Pegasus Racing Stable	1:11.00
1988	Zadracarta	Sandy Hawley	Patrick J. Collins	Mr. Stavaro Sa	1:10.60
1987	Ruling Angel	David Penna	James E. Day	Sam-Son Farm	1:11.20
1986	Futurette	Jeff Fell	Donald Walker	J. B. W. Carmichael	1:10.60
1985	Summer Mood	Jack M. Lauzon	Roger Attfield	Kinghaven Farms	1:10.80
1984	Summer Mood	Jack M. Lauzon	John J. Tammaro, Sr.	Kinghaven Farms	1:10.60
1983	Lil Ol Gal	Robin Platts	Roger Attfield	John Franks	1:13.60
1982	Avowal	Brian Swatuk	Arthur H. Warner	R.R. Kennedy	1.11.20
1981	Eternal Search	Brian Swatuk	E. Mann	Jim Dandy Stables	1:12.20
1980	La Voyageuse	J.P. Souter	John Starr	Jean-Louis Lévesque	1:09.80
1979	La Voyageuse	J.P. Souter	John Starr	Jean-Louis Lévesque	1:11.20

== See also ==
- List of Canadian flat horse races
