= He's A Smoothie =

Canadian-bred Thoroughbred racehorse

- Sire: Round Table
- Grandsire: Princequillo
- Dam: Ratine
- Damsire: Bahram
- Sex: Stallion
- Foaled: 1963
- Country: Canada
- Colour: Bay
- Breeder: William R. Beasley
- Owner: William R. Beasley
- Trainer: Warren Beasley & Robert S. Bateman
- Record: 38: 18-4-6
- Earnings: $258,410

Major wins
- Seagram Cup Handicap (1966, 1967); Fairbanks Handicap (1966); Mohawk Handicap (1966); Valedictory Handicap (1966); Canadian Maturity Stakes (1967); Durham Cup Handicap (1967); Eclipse Stakes (1967); Canadian International Championship (1967); Hialeah Turf Cup Handicap (1968) Canadian Classic Race wins: Prince of Wales Stakes (1966)

Awards
- Canadian Horse of the Year (1967)

Honours
- Canadian Horse Racing Hall of Fame (2003)

He's A Smoothie (foaled 1963 in Ontario) was a Canadian Thoroughbred Champion and Hall of Fame racehorse who set track records on both dirt and turf. Bred and raced by William R. Beasley, his sire was the U.S. Racing Hall of Fame inductee Round Table. His dam was Ratine, a daughter of Bahram, the Aga Khan's 1935 British Triple Crown champion. A successful sire of two British Classic winners, Bahram was purchased in 1940 by an American syndicate led by Alfred G. Vanderbilt II, who brought him to stand at stud in Maryland.

== Racing career ==
=== 1966 ===
He's a Smoothie was trained by the owner's son, Warren Beasley, who said, "I was listed as the trainer but Bobby (Bateman) was really the trainer." Slow to develop, the colt did not race at age two. At age three, he earned his first win in May 1966 on the dirt at the Fort Erie Racetrack in Fort Erie, Ontario. He went on to win the Mohawk Handicap, the Fairbanks Handicap, the first of two straight Seagram Cup Handicaps, the Valedictory Handicap at 1 3/4 miles, and a Canadian Classic, the Prince of Wales Stakes.

=== 1967 Horse of the Year ===
In 1967, He's a Smoothie raced in both Canada and the United States. His major victories came in the Canadian Maturity Stakes, the Durham Cup Handicap, the Eclipse Stakes, his second straight Seagram Cup Handicap, and the most prestigious win of his career, the Canadian International Championship.

Based on his performances in Canada, He's a Smoothie was invited to compete against some of the best American and European horses in the November 12, 1967 Washington, D.C. International Stakes at Laurel Park Racecourse in Maryland. He's a Smoothie ran fourth after he was given seven more pounds to carry that the great Damascus and race winner Fort Marcy. On December 9, He's A Smoothie was sent to Aqueduct Racetrack to compete in the Display Handicap. Once again he was high-weighted, given a handicap of nine pounds more than winner Quicken Tree. Nonetheless, he still came from far back in the two-mile race to finish second, just three-quarters of a length behind the winner.

He's a Smoothie was voted 1967 Canadian Horse of the Year honors.

=== 1968 ===
Wintered in Florida, at Gulfstream Park He's a Smoothie ran second in a division of the January 24, 1968 Palm Beach Handicap, then earned a third in the February 11 Bougainvillea Handicap at Hialeah Park Race Track. In the longest and richest of the grass races on the local 1968 race schedule, on February 24 He's a Smoothie was ridden by Braulio Baeza to victory in the 1½ mile Hialeah Turf Cup Handicap. The holder of a Woodbine Racetrack and a Greenwood Raceway track record on dirt, among his other 1968 wins in Canada He's a Smoothie set a new course record for 1 1/16 miles on turf at the Fort Erie Racetrack.

=== Sale and Death ===
On July 24, 1968, He's a Smoothie was sold to a California syndicate led by William E. Pasko III, who planned to retire the horse at the end of the year to stand at stud. He's a Smoothie was competing in the August 7 Bernard Baruch Handicap at Saratoga Race Course when he broke down as a result of torn ligaments and had to be humanely euthanized.

In 2003, He's a Smoothie's racing career was honored with induction in the Canadian Horse Racing Hall of Fame.

== Pedigree ==
Pedigree of He's a Smoothie
Sire Round Table	Princequillo	Prince Rose	Rose Prince
Sire Round Table	Princequillo	Prince Rose	Indolence
Sire Round Table	Princequillo	Cosquilla	Papyrus
Sire Round Table	Princequillo	Cosquilla	Quick Thought
Sire Round Table	Knight's Daughter	Sir Cosmo	The Boss
Sire Round Table	Knight's Daughter	Sir Cosmo	Ayn Hali
Sire Round Table	Knight's Daughter	Feola	Friar Marcus
Sire Round Table	Knight's Daughter	Feola	Aloe
Dam Ratine	Bahram	Blandford	Swynford
Dam Ratine	Bahram	Blandford	Blanche
Dam Ratine	Bahram	Friar's Daughter	Friar Marcus
Dam Ratine	Bahram	Friar's Daughter	Garron Lass
Dam Ratine	Monel	Sir Greysteel	Roi Herode
Dam Ratine	Monel	Sir Greysteel	Grania
Dam Ratine	Monel	La Muiron	Durbar
Dam Ratine	Monel	La Muiron	Santa Maria

* He's A Smoothie is inbred 4S x 4D to the stallion Friar Marcus, meaning that he appears fourth generation on the sire side of his pedigree and fourth generation on the dam side of his pedigree.
