= Raja Baba =

American-bred Thoroughbred racehorse

- Sire: Bold Ruler
- Grandsire: Nasrullah
- Dam: Missy Baba
- Damsire: My Babu
- Sex: Stallion
- Foaled: 1968
- Country: United States
- Colour: Dark Bay
- Breeder: Michael G. Phipps
- Owner: Michael G. Phipps
- Trainer: Del W. Carroll
- Record: 41: 7-12-9
- Earnings: US$123,287

Major wins
- Alligator Handicap (1970); Francis Scott Key Stakes (1971); Delaware Valley Handicap (1971)

Awards
- Leading sire in North America (1980)

Honours
- Raja Baba Purse at Aqueduct Racetrack

Raja Baba (April 5, 1968 – October 9, 2002) was an American Thoroughbred racehorse who became the 1980 Champion sire in North America.

== Background ==
Raja Baba was sired by Bold Ruler, the leading sire in North America eight times and a National Museum of Racing and Hall of Fame inductee. His dam was Missy Baba, a daughter of My Babu, a winner of the British Classic 2,000 Guineas Stakes in 1948 who became the influential sire of forty-seven stakes winners and a damsire sire of ninety-five winners.

Raja Baba was bred and raced by Michael G. Phipps, the son of Ogden Phipps.

== Racing career ==
As a three-year-old, he won the Francis Scott Key Stakes at Bowie Race Course followed a week later by a division of the Delaware Valley Handicap at Garden State Park. At age four, Raja Baba won the Bold Ruler Purse at Delaware Park Racetrack and finished second in the Phoenix Handicap at Keeneland, the Japan Racing Association Handicap at Laurel Park, and the Garrison Handicap at Liberty Bell Park Racetrack.

== Stud record ==
Near the end of his racing career, Raja Baba was sold to William S. Farish III who in turn sold a half interest to breeder, Warner L. Jones. He was syndicated in 1972 in a 36 share deal at $10,000 per share, a figure that his success as a stallion would see rise to a selling price of $205,000 per share on the open market by 1982. Retired from racing at the end of 1972, he was sent to stand at stud at Warner Jones' Hermitage Farm near Goshen, Kentucky. As a freshman stallion in 1976, Raja Baba was the leading juvenile sire in the United States and four years later both the leading juvenile sire and overall leading sire in the United States.

During his career at stud, Raja Baba sired sixty-two stakes winners and two Champions. In 1985, his daughter Summer Mood won the Sovereign Award as the Canadian Champion Sprint Horse of either sex. Another daughter, Sacahuista, won the 1987 Breeders' Cup Distaff and was voted the Eclipse Award as that year's American Champion Three-Year-Old Filly. Sacahuista was the dam of Hussonet who became a highly successful multiple Champion sire in Chile and who in 2002 earned the highest stud fee of any stallion ever to have stood in that country and Gran Zar Horse of the year and champion 3 year old in Mexico Triple crown winner.

Raja Baba's other successful offspring included Is It True, winner of the 1988 Breeders' Cup Juvenile, as well as Grade 1 winners Junius, Well Decorated and Royal Ski, the latter the damsire of the undefeated Japanese runner Agnes Tachyon who became the Leading sire in Japan in 2008.

At the end of the 1987 breeding season Raja Baba was pensioned. He was euthanized at Hermitage Farm in 2002 at age thirty-four due to complications from age related infirmities and was buried in its equine cemetery.

== Pedigree ==
Pedigree of Raja Baba, bay stallion 1968
Sire Bold Ruler	Nasrullah	Nearco	Pharos
Sire Bold Ruler	Nasrullah	Nearco	Nogara
Sire Bold Ruler	Nasrullah	Mumtaz Begum	Blenheim
Sire Bold Ruler	Nasrullah	Mumtaz Begum	Mumtaz Muhal
Sire Bold Ruler	Miss Disco	Discovery	Display
Sire Bold Ruler	Miss Disco	Discovery	Ariadne
Sire Bold Ruler	Miss Disco	Outdone	Pompey
Sire Bold Ruler	Miss Disco	Outdone	Sweep Out
Dam Missy Baba	My Babu	Djebel	Tourbillon
Dam Missy Baba	My Babu	Djebel	Loika
Dam Missy Baba	My Babu	Perfume	Badruddin
Dam Missy Baba	My Babu	Perfume	Lavendula
Dam Missy Baba	Uvira	Umidwar	Blandford
Dam Missy Baba	Uvira	Umidwar	Uganda
Dam Missy Baba	Uvira	Lady Lawless	Son-in-Law
Dam Missy Baba	Uvira	Lady Lawless	Entanglement
