= La Voyageuse =

Canadian-bred Thoroughbred racehorse

- Sire: Tentam
- Grandsire: Intentionally
- Dam: Fanfreluche
- Damsire: Northern Dancer
- Sex: Mare
- Foaled: 1975
- Country: Canada
- Colour: Dark Bay/Brown
- Breeder: Jean-Louis Levesque
- Owner: Jean-Louis Levesque
- Trainer: Yonnie Starr
- Record: 56: 26-10-7
- Earnings: $524,993

Major wins
- Canadian Oaks (1978); Bison City Stakes (1978); Miss Tropical Handicap (1979, 1980); Ontario Matron Handicap (1979, 1980); Ontario Fashion Stakes (1979, 1980); Seaway Stakes (1980); Canadian Stakes (1980); George C. Hendrie Handicap (1980); Nearctic Handicap (1980)

Awards
- Canadian Champion 3-Year-Old Filly (1978); Canadian Champion Older Female Horse (1979); Canadian Champion Sprinter (1980)

Honours
- Canadian Horse Racing Hall of Fame (2009); La Voyageuse Stakes at Woodbine Racetrack

La Voyageuse (foaled 1975 in Ontario) is a Canadian Thoroughbred racehorse who was a three-time Sovereign Award winner. She was bred and raced by prominent Quebec businessman and major racing stable owner Jean-Louis Levesque.

Retired to broodmare duty for the 1981 season, La Voyageuse produced thirteen foals between then and 1997. One of her daughters, Society Lady (1990), produced the European Champion Two-Year-Old Filly, Bint Allayl.

La Voyageuse was inducted into the Canadian Horse Racing Hall of Fame on August 27, 2009.
