= Ice Water (horse) =

Canadian-bred Thoroughbred racehorse

- Sire: Nearctic
- Grandsire: Nearco
- Dam: Seiches
- Damsire: Count Fleet
- Sex: Filly
- Foaled: 1963
- Country: Canada
- Colour: Bay
- Breeder: Gardiner Farms
- Owner: Gardiner Farms
- Trainer: Lou Cavalaris, Jr.
- Record: 66: 22-11-9
- Earnings: CAN$148,757

Major wins
- Natalma Stakes (1965); Achievement Handicap (1966); Belle Mahone Stakes (1966, 1967, 1968); Toronto Cup Handicap (1966); Wonder Where Stakes (1966); Nassau Stakes (1967); Whimsical Stakes (1967); Nettie Handicap (1968); Seaway Stakes (1968)

Honours
- Ice Water Stakes at Woodbine Racetrack

Ice Water (foaled 1963 in Ontario) was a Canadian Thoroughbred racehorse.

== Background ==
Ice Water was a bay mare owned and bred by George Gardiner. She was the daughter of Gardiner's unraced filly Seiches who was a daughter of the 1948 U.S. Triple Crown champion, Count Fleet. Ice Water's sire was Nearctic who also sired the most influential sire of the 20th Century, Northern Dancer. She was trained by future Hall of Fame trainer, Lou Cavalaris, Jr.,

== Racing career ==
Racing at tracks in Toronto, at age two Ice Water won the important Natalma Stakes. At age three in 1966, she defeated her male counterparts in the Achievement Handicap, Toronto Cup Handicap, and the Nassau Stakes. Against females, Ice Water won the Wonder Where Stakes and the Belle Mahone Stakes. Although she ran second in the Canadian Oaks, she ended 1966 as the dominant filly in her country.

Ice Water raced and won at age four and five, notably winning her second and third consecutive runnings of the Belle Mahone Stakes.

== Breeding record ==
She was retired to broodmare duty for the 1969 season at her owner's breeding farm where she had limited success.
