= Algoma Stakes =

- Class: Restricted stakes
- Location: Woodbine Racetrack; Toronto, Ontario, Canada
- Inaugurated: 1992
- Race type: Thoroughbred - Flat racing
- Website: www.woodbineentertainment.com/qct/default.asp

Race information
- Distance: 1 1/16 miles
- Surface: Polytrack
- Track: left-handed
- Qualification: Canadian-bred fillies & mares, three-years-old & up
- Weight: Assigned
- Purse: $135,000 (2020)

The Algoma Stakes is a Canadian Thoroughbred horse race run annually at Woodbine Racetrack in Toronto, Ontario. Restricted to Canadian-Bred and foaled fillies and mares, age three and older, the Algoma Stakes is one of the CTHS Yearling Sales Stakes. It is contested on Polytrack synthetic dirt over a distance of one and one-sixteenth miles (8.5 furlongs).

== Records ==
Speed record: (Through 1998, Woodbine times were recorded in fifths of a second. Since 1999 they are in hundredths of a second)

- 1:42.90 - Roses 'n' Wine (2009)

Most wins:

- 3 - One For Rose (2003, 2004, 2005)

Most wins by an owner:

- 3 - Tucci Stables (2003, 2004, 2005)

Most wins by a jockey:

- 3 - Emile Ramsammy (2003, 2004, 2005)

Most wins by a trainer:

- 3 - Roger Attfield (1992, 1994, 2002)
- 3 - Sid C. Attard (2003, 2004, 2005)

== Winners ==
Year	Winner	Age	Jockey	Trainer	Owner	Time
2016	Sweater Weather	5	Jermaine V. Bridgmohan	Robert P. Tiller	Frank D. Di Giulio Jr.	1:45.13
2015	Brooklynsway	3	Emma-Jayne Wilson	John A. Ross	J.R. Racing Stable	1:43.98
2014	I'm a Kittyhawk	4	David Moran	Robert Crean	J., M., N. & V. Earle/Crean	1:44.19
2013	Logan's Peak	4	Eurico Rosa Da Silva	Nicolas Gonzalez	Kennedy/Lessee	1:44.71
2012	Tee Game	5	Richard Dos Ramos	Sam DiPasquale	Louie/DiPasquale	1:45.78
2011	Euro Platinum	4	Corey Fraser	Audre Cappuccitti	Audre Cappuccitti	1:44.58
2010	Secret Wish	4	James McAleney	Elizabeth R. Charalambous	Cudney Stables	1:45.66
2009	Roses 'n' Wine	4	Chantal Sutherland	David R. Bell	Firestone Farms	1:42.90
2008	Arden Belle	5	Jono Jones	Robert Gerl	Salt and Pepper Stable	1:44.10
2007	Arden Belle	4	Matt Moore	Ronald Sadler	Salt and Pepper Stable	1:45.75
2006	Financingavailable	5	James McAleney	Lorne Richards	K. K. Sangara	1:45.04
2005	One For Rose	6	Emile Ramsammy	Sid C. Attard	Tucci Stables	1:44.24
2004	One For Rose	5	Emile Ramsammy	Sid C. Attard	Tucci Stables	1:43.54
2003	One For Rose	4	Emile Ramsammy	Sid C. Attard	Tucci Stables	1:43.90
2002	Small Promises	4	James McAleney	Roger Attfield	Attfield & Kinghaven Farms	1:45.14
2001	Healing Knowledge	4	Todd Kabel	Vito Armata	J. Armata & G. Mazarese	1:47.56
2000	Gandria	4	Constant Montpellier	James W. Cheadle	Arosa Farms	1:45.97
1999	Synchronized	3	Tyrone Harding	Reade Baker	John A. Franks	1:44.69
1998	Solarity	3	David Clark	Michael Mattine	Ted Burnett	1:46.20
1997	Silky Oaks	4	Steve Bahen	Emile Allain	George M. Hendrie	1:47.40
1996	Wings of Erin	4	Kevin Willey	Thomas O'Keefe	Les Roberts / Matthews	1:44.00
1995	Holly Regent	4	Todd Kabel	Peter DiPasquale	Peter DiPasquale	1:43.40
1994	Plenty of Sugar	3	Robert Landry	Roger Attfield	Kinghaven / R. Ferguson	1:43.80
1993	Smiles With A Fist	3	James McKnight	Michelle Bonte	Gierkink / Bonte	1:44.40
1992	A Gal For Gordo	4	Don Seymour	Roger Attfield	Tibor Bankuti / Larson	1:44.40
