= Belle Mahone Stakes =

- Class: Grade III
- Location: Woodbine Racetrack; Toronto, Ontario, Canada
- Inaugurated: 1956
- Race type: Thoroughbred - Flat racing
- Website: web.archive.org/web/20100316214346/http://www.woodbineentertainment.com:80/qct/default.asp

Race information
- Distance: 1 1/16 miles (8.5 furlongs)
- Surface: Polytrack
- Track: left-handed
- Qualification: Fillies & Mares, three-years-old & up
- Weight: Three-year-olds: 117 lbs., Older horses: 122 lbs, plus Allowances
- Purse: $75,750

The Belle Mahone Stakes is a Canadian Thoroughbred horse race run annually at Woodbine Racetrack in Toronto, Ontario. Run in August, the ungraded event is open to fillies and mares, age three and older. Raced over a distance of 1 1/16 miles on Polytrack synthetic dirt, it currently offers a purse of $75,750.

The Belle Mahone Stakes was first run in 1956 but was ended after the 1997 edition. Revived in 2002, there was no race held in 2005.

Upgraded to Grade III in 2023.

== Records ==
Most wins:

- 3 - Ice Water (1966, 1967, 1968)

Fastest Time:

- 1:42.26 - Caitlinhergrtness (2025)

Most Owner wins:

- 2 - Stronach Stable (2004, 2009)
- 2 - Ivan Dalos (2017, 2018)

Most Trainer wins:

- 4 - Mark E. Casse (2015, 2016, 2021, 2023)
- 4 - Roger L. Attfield (1987, 1988, 1994, 2002)

Most Jockey wins:

- 6 - Todd Kabel (1990, 1992, 1995, 1997, 2004, 2009)

== Winners ==
Year	Winner	Age	Jockey	Trainer	Owner	Time
2026	Deloraine	4	Ryan Munger	Eion G. Hardy	Godolphin	1:44.47
2025	Caitlinhergrtness	4	Rafael Manuel Hernandez	Kevin Attard	WinStar Farm LLC	1:42.26
2024	Fashionably Fab	4	Pietro Moran	Kevin Attard	Terra Racing Stable	1:43.73
2023	Souper Hoity Toity	4	Patrick Husbands	Mark E. Casse	Live Oak Plantation	1:44.49
2022	Dreaming of Drew	4	Kazushi Kimura	Barbara J. Minshall	Hoolie Racing Stable LLC and Madaket Stables LLC	1:44.08
2021	Skygaze	4	Patrick Husbands	Mark E. Casse	Tracy Farmer	1:42.73
2020	Summer Sunday	5	Rafael Manuel Hernandez	Stuart C. Simon	William J. and Anne Scott	1:44.08
2019	Lift Up	5	Patrick Husbands	Michael W. Dickinson	Augustin Stables	1:43.57
2018	Gamble's Ghost	5	Eurico Rosa Da Silva	Josie Carroll	Ivan Dalos	1:44.51
2017	Gamble's Ghost	4	Luis Contreras	Josie Carroll	Ivan Dalos	1:44.83
2016	Uchenna (IRE)	5	Patrick Husbands	Mark E. Casse	Gary Barber	1:43.74
2015	Theogony	5	Gary Boulanger	Mark E. Casse	Conrad Farms	1:44.13
2014	NO RACE?					
2013	Reconnect	5	Jesse M. Campbell	Ashlee Brnjas	Colebrook Farms	1:44.72
2012	Moment of Majesty	5	Gerry Olguin	Sue Leslie	Meehan/S. & C. Joseph	1:45.63
2011	Stars to Shine	4	Patrick Husbands	Mark R. Frostad	Grange House Partnership	1:43.77
2010	Biofuel	3	Eurico Rosa Da Silva	Reade Baker	Brereton C. Jones	1:44.27
2009	Ginger Brew	4	Todd Kabel	Brian A. Lynch	Stronach Stable	1:43.55
2008	Serenading	4	David Clark	Josie Carroll	John & Glen Sikura	1:43.14
2007	Arden Belle	4	Matt Moore	Ronald H. Sadler	Salt and Pepper Stable	1:44.29
2006	Roving Angel	4	Justin Stein	Robert A. Pion	Keith & Rachel McClelland	1:44.43
2005	no race					
2004	Winning Chance	5	Todd Kabel	Daniel J. Vella	Stronach Stable	1:45.27
2003	Royal Dalliance	6	Na Somsanith	Joanna Iglar-Hughes	Dave Hughes/John Godwin	145.99
2002	Extend	4	David Clark	Roger Attfield	Cam Allard	1:45.51

== Earlier winners ==
- 2001 - no race
- 2000 - no race
- 1999 - no race
- 1998 - no race
- 1997 - Mips
- 1996 - Ennisbeg
- 1995 - Holly Regent
- 1994 - Pennyhill Park
- 1993 - Dance For Donna
- 1992 - Platinum Paws
- 1991 - Wilderness Song
- 1990 - One More Breeze
- 1989 - Charming Sassafras
- 1988 - Arcroyal
- 1987 - Playlist
- 1986 - Regency Silk
- 1985 - Conform
- 1984 - Sintrillium
- 1983 - Noble Town
- 1982 - Eternal Search
- 1981 - Solar Command
- 1980 - Feu d'Artifice
- 1979 - Glorious Song
- 1978 - La Malchance
- 1977 - Reasonable win
- 1976 - Bed Shy
- 1975 - Lost Majorette
- 1974 - Lost Majorette
- 1973 - Connie Pat
- 1972 - Connie Pat
- 1971 - Painted Pony
- 1970 - Not Too Shy
- 1969 - Miss Suzaki
- 1968 - Ice Water
- 1967 - Ice Water
- 1966 - Ice Water
- 1965 - Speedy Lament
- 1964 - Menedict
- 1963 - Stormy Morn
- 1962 - Court Royal
- 1961 - Mystery Guest
- 1960 - Royal Border
- 1959 - Wonder Where
- 1958 - Queen of Wind
- 1957 - La Belle Rose
- 1956 - Butter Ball
