= Seagram Cup Stakes =

- Class: Grade III
- Location: Woodbine Racetrack; Toronto, Ontario, Canada
- Inaugurated: 1903
- Race type: Thoroughbred - Flat racing
- Website: www.woodbineentertainment.com/qct/default.asp

Race information
- Distance: 1 1/16 miles (8.5 furlongs)
- Surface: Polytrack
- Track: Left-handed
- Qualification: Three-year-olds & Up
- Weight: Allowances
- Purse: $115,065 (2016)

The Chinese Cultural Centre Seagram Cup Stakes is a Thoroughbred horse race run annually during the last week of July/first week of August at Woodbine Racetrack in Toronto, Ontario, Canada. A Grade III event, it is open to horses Three years old and up. Raced over a distance of one and one-sixteenth miles, the race currently offers a purse of $115,065.

The Seagram Cup was inaugurated at the Old Woodbine Racetrack in 1903. A race on dirt, it was named in honor of owner/breeder Joseph E. Seagram whose Seagram Stables dominated Canadian racing at the time and who had won Canada's most prestigious race, the Queen's Plate, eight consecutive times between 1891 and 1898. With the cessation of Thoroughbred racing at Old Woodbine Racetrack, the Seagram Cup was moved to the new Woodbine Racetrack and in 1959 became a race on turf.

In 1998 the Seagram Cup reverted to being run permanently on dirt with the 2007 edition marking the first time it would be raced on the new synthetic Polytrack surface.

Over the years the Seagram Cup has been contested at various distances:
On dirt:

- 1 1/16 miles : 1903–1924 (Old Woodbine Racetrack)
- 1 1/2 miles : 1925–1926 (Old Woodbine Racetrack)
- 1 1/8 miles : 1928–1930 (Old Woodbine Racetrack)
- 1 1/16 miles : 1934–1958 (Old Woodbine Racetrack), 1959–1963 and 1998 to present at Woodbine Racetrack
- 1 1/4 miles : 1980–1981 Greenwood Raceway

On turf:

- 1 1/16 miles : 1959–1963 (Woodbine Racetrack)
- 1 1/4 miles : 1964–1979, 1982–1993 (Woodbine Racetrack)
- 1 3/8 miles : 1994–1997 (Woodbine Racetrack)

== Records ==
Speed record:

- 1:41.40 - Terremoto (1998) (at 1 1/16 miles on dirt)
- 2:00.60 - Sky Classic (1991) (at 1 1/4 miles on turf)

Most wins by a jockey:

- 7 - Sandy Hawley (1974, 1976, 1978, 1979, 1988, 1989, 1996)
- 7 - Patrick Husbands (2007, 2011, 2015, 2019, 2020, 2024, 2025)

Most wins by a trainer:

- 5 - Mark E. Casse (2015, 2021, 2024, 2025, 2026)

Most wins by an owner:

- 6 - Sam-Son Farm (1986, 1988, 1989, 1991, 1996, 2014)

== Winners of the Seagram Cup Stakes ==
Year	Winner	Age	Jockey	Trainer	Owner	Time
2026	Paramount Prince	6	Fraser Aebly	Mark E. Casse	Michael J. Langlois and Gary Barber	1:43.24
2025	Swift Delivery	4	Patrick Husbands	Mark E. Casse	Gary Barber, Team Valor International LLC, Travis Kelce, Bruce Zoldan and Steven Rocco	1:43.65
2024	Paramount Prince	4	Patrick Husbands	Mark E. Casse	Michael J. Longlois and Gary Barber	1:43.37
2023	Tyson	4	Rafael Manuel Hernandez	Josie Carroll	Hill 'n' Dale Equine Holdings Inc. (J. G. Sikura) and Stretch Run Ventures LLC	1:43.26
2022	War Bomber (IRE)	4	Sahin Civaci	Norman McKnight	Bruno Schickedanz	1:43.26
2021	Tap It To Win	4	Rafael Hernandez	Mark E. Casse	Live Oak Plantation	1:43.79
2020	Mr Ritz (GB)	5	Patrick Husbands	Josie Carroll	Earle I Mack	1:43.28
2019	Mr Ritz (GB)	4	Patrick Husbands	Josie Carroll	Earle I Mack	1:42.75
2018	Decorated Soldier	5	Gary Boulanger	Norman McKnight	Racer's Edge Inc & Maxis Stable	1:43.71
2017	Melmich	6	Eurico Rosa da Silva	Kevin Attard	Stephen Chesney & Cory Hoffman	1:43.43
2016	Breaking Lucky	4	Luis Contreras	Reade Baker	Gunpowder Farms	1:42.70
2015	Florida Won	4	Patrick Husbands	Mark E. Casse	Live Oak Plantation	1:43.33
2014	His Race to Win	4	Eurico Rosa Da Silva	Malcolm Pierce	Sam-Son Farm	1:43.35
2013	Alpha Bettor	5	Justin Stein	Daniel J. Vella	Bulldog Racing	1:43.63
2012	Alpha Bettor	4	Tyler Pizarro	Daniel J. Vella	Bulldog Racing	1:43.79
2011	James Street	4	Patrick Husbands	Josie Carroll	Eugene Melynyk	1:44.01
2010	Sand Cove	5	Richard Dos Ramos	Roger Attfield	Ralph L. Johnson	1:43.57
2009	Palladio	7	Richard Dos Ramos	Roger Attfield	Haras Santa Maria de Araras	1:43.84
2008	Artie Hot	4	Emma-Jayne Wilson	Nicholas Gonzalez	Tucci Stables	1:43.30
2007	Gouldings Green	6	Patrick Husbands	Anthony Reinstedler	Melnyk Racing Stable	1:43.73
2006	Gouldings Green	5	Corey Lanerie	Anthony Reinstedler	Melnyk Racing Stable	1:42.76
2005	One For Rose	6	Emile Ramsammy	Sid Attard	Tucci Stables	1:44.18
2004	One For Rose	5	Emile Ramsammy	Sid Attard	Tucci Stables	1:44.34
2003	Wake at Noon	6	Emile Ramsammy	Abraham Katryan	Bruno Schickedanz	1:42.92
2002	Lucky Molar	7	Chantal Sutherland	Mike Wright, Jr.	Richard A. Englander	1:44.51
2001	Trajectory	4	Ramon Dominguez	H. Graham Motion	Pin Oak Stable	1:43.97
2000	Guided Tour	4	Gary Boulanger	Niall O'Callaghan	Morton Fink	1:42.04
1999	Brite Adam	4	Todd Kabel	Norman J. McKnight	R.M.C. Stable	1:42.57
1998	Terremoto	7	Todd Kabel	Beverly Buck	Janeane & Arika Everatt	1:41.40
1997	Crown Attorney	4	Steven Bahen	John P. MacKenzie	Tony & Mary Jane Lamb	2:15.20
1996	Desert Waves	6	Sandy Hawley	Mark Frostad	Sam-Son Farm	2:14.20
1995	Jet Freighter	4	Todd Kabel	Tony Mattine	Fishman/Yu	2:13.40
1994	Zester	5	Larry Attard	Gil Rowntree	Rodomar/Badali	2:21.60
1993	Avid Affection	4	James McKnight	John Cardella	C.E.C. Farms	2:02.20
1992	Cozzene's Prince	5	Dave Penna	Tino Attard	Kirby Canada Farm	2:05.80
1991	Sky Classic	4	Pat Day	James E. Day	Sam-Son Farm	2:00.60
1990	Twist The Snow	4	Larry Attard	Angus McArthur	Angus McArthur	2:02.80
1989	King's Deputy	4	Sandy Hawley	James E. Day	Sam-Son Farm	2:01.40
1988	Royal Treasurer	5	Sandy Hawley	James E. Day	Sam-Son Farm	2:03.20
1987	Coryphee	3	Brian Swatuk	Sam DiPasquale	S. Carnevale	2:12.40
1986	Royal Treasurer	3	Jack Lauzon	James E. Day	Sam-Son Farm	2:16.00
1985	Corseque	4	Robert King, Jr.	David L. Maclean	Norcliffe Stables	2:03.60
1984	Cool Northerner	3	Gary Stahlbaum	Jacques Dumas	F. & P. D'Andrea	2:03.20
1983	Bridle Path	7	Dan Beckon	Macdonald Benson	Windfields Farm	2:06.00
1982	Bridle Path	6	John Paul Souter	Macdonald Benson	Windfields Farm	2:09.40
1981	Right Role	4	John Bell	Emile Allain	Jean Josephson	2:07.60
1980	Driving Home	3	Rick Hedge	Glenn Magnusson	CFCW Racing Stable	2:04.60
1979	Christy's Mount	6	Sandy Hawley	Dave Brown	D. H. Bunker	2:07.20
1978	Regal Embrace	3	Sandy Hawley	Macdonald Benson	Windfields Farm	2:09.00
1977	Hopeful Answer	4	Gary Stahlbaum	Frank Merrill, Jr.	W. Preston Gilbride	2:20.60
1976	Momigi	4	Sandy Hawley	John Morahan	Koichiro Hayata	2:07.80
1975	Good Port	5	Richard Grubb	Gil Rowntree	Stafford Farms	2:15.40
1974	Fabe Count	6	Sandy Hawley	Jerry G. Lavigne	Parkview Stable	2:02.80
1973	Twice Lucky	7	Hugo Dittfach	Donnie Walker	Conn Smythe	2:11.20
1972	Lord Vancouver	4	Lloyd Duffy	Frank Merrill, Jr.	W. Preston Gilbride	2:02.00
1971	Dance Act	5	Robin Platts	Larry Grant	Green Hills Farm	2:03.80
1970	Yukon Eric	4	Hugo Dittfach	Lou Cavalaris, Jr.	Gardiner Farm	2:02.80
1969	Bye and Near	6	Avelino Gomez	Donnie Walker	Conn Smythe	2:04.20
1968	Pine Point	4	Fernando Toro	Red Barnard	Willow Downs Farm	2:04.40
1967	He's A Smoothie	4	Avelino Gomez	Warren Beasley	William R. Beasley	2:05.00
1966	He's A Smoothie	3	Sam McComb	Warren Beasley	William R. Beasley	2:05.40
1965	Victorian Era	3	Avelino Gomez	Lou Cavalaris, Jr.	A. Case, Jr.	2:04.40
1964	Galindo	6	Wayne Harris	Andrew G. Smithers	John B. Azanza	2:03.00
1963	Windy Ship	6	Paul Bohenko	Howard C. Hoffman	Stafford Farms	1:45.20
1962	Chopavane	6	Jim Fitzsimmons	M. Long	Viscount Hardinge	1:43.80
1961	Windy Ship	4	Hugo Dittfach	John Passero	Stafford Farms	1:44.20
1960	Chopavane	4	C. M. Clark	M. Long	Viscount Hardinge	1:44.40
1959	New Providence	3	Avelino Gomez	Gordon J. McCann	Windfields Farm	1:46.80
1958	Our Sirdar	4	Al Coy	Red Barnard	Shermanor Farm	1:45.20
1957	Dorenes Lad	5	Norman Leid	N. Julius	Clifford Bennett	1:44.20
1956	Canadian Champ	3	E. A. Rodriguez	John Passero	William R. Beasley	1:46.00
1955	Ace Marine	3	George Walker	Yonnie Starr	Larkin Maloney	1:45.60

== Earlier winners ==
- 1954 - Verey Light
- 1953 - Teddy's Sister
- 1952 - Bulverde
- 1951 - McGill
- 1950 - McGill
- 1949 - No race
- 1948 - No race
- 1947 - Mugwump
- 1946 - No race
- 1945 - No race
- 1944 - Chance Cross
- 1943 - Tulachmore
- 1942 - No race
- 1941 - McMark
- 1940 - High Honors
- 1939 - Siete Colores
- 1938 - Storm Lass
- 1937 - Sun Power
- 1936 - No race
- 1935 - No race
- 1934 - Prince Fox
- 1933 - No race
- 1932 - No race
- 1931 - No race
- 1930 - Sandy Ford
- 1929 - Jollan
- 1928 - Sir Harry
- 1927 - No race
- 1926 - Harrovan
- 1925 - Edisto
- 1924 - Nancy Langhorne
- 1923 - New Hampshire
- 1922 - Baby Grand
- 1921 - Golden Sphere
- 1920 - No race
- 1919 - No race
- 1918 - No race
- 1917 - No race
- 1916 - Sands of Pleasure
- 1915 - Redland
- 1914 - Privet Petal
- 1913 - Rifle Brigade
- 1912 - Chepontuc
- 1911 - Ganogue
- 1910 - Ta Nun Da
- 1909 - Direct
- 1908 - Photographer
- 1907 - Picaroon
- 1906 - Moonraker
- 1905 - Charles Elwood
- 1904 - Nameoki
- 1903 - Easy Street
*In 1954, Queen's Own finished first but was disqualified and set back to second

== See also ==
- List of Canadian flat horse races
