= Bint Allayl =

British-bred Thoroughbred racehorse

- Racing silks of Sheikh Ahmed Al Maktoum
- Sire: Green Desert
- Grandsire: Danzig
- Dam: Society Lady
- Damsire: Mr. Prospector
- Sex: Filly
- Foaled: 19 January 1996
- Country: United Kingdom
- Colour: Bay
- Breeder: Sheikh Ahmed Al Maktoum
- Owner: Sheikh Ahmed Al Maktoum
- Trainer: Mick Channon
- Record: 4:3-1-0
- Earnings: £86,927

Major wins
- Queen Mary Stakes (1998); Lowther Stakes (1998)

Awards
- European Champion Two-year-old Filly (1998)

Bint Allayl (19 January 1996 – 22 February 1999) was a British champion Thoroughbred racehorse. She was rated the best two-year-old filly of 1998 by both the International Classification and the Cartier Racing Awards. She won three of her four races including the Queen Mary Stakes and the Lowther Stakes and was made favourite for the 1999 1000 Guineas. She was put down after suffering an injury in training in February 1999.

== Background ==
Bint Allayl, a powerfully built ("barrel-chested") bay filly, was bred by her owner Sheikh Ahmed Al Maktoum. She was sired by Green Desert out of the Mr. Prospector mare Society Lady.

Green Desert finished second to Dancing Brave in the 2000 Guineas and became a leading sprinter, winning the July Cup. Apart from Bint Allayl, he sired the winners of over 1,000 races, including Oasis Dream, Sheikh Albadou and Cape Cross, the sire of Sea the Stars. Society Lady, a daughter of the Canadian champion La Voyageuse, failed to win a race but produced the Jersey Stakes winner Kheleyf. Bint Allayl was inbred 3x4 to Northern Dancer (see below)

Bint Allayl was sent into training with Mick Channon at West Ilsley, Berkshire.

== Racing career ==
=== 1996: two-year-old season ===
Bint Allayl made her debut in a five-furlong maiden race at York in May. Ridden by Frankie Dettori, she reportedly had "every chance" but was beaten a neck by Pipalong, a filly who went on to be a Group One winning sprinter. It was to be her only defeat. Two weeks later, she reappeared in the Listed National Stakes at Sandown. She was held up by Dettori before being sent past the odds-on favourite, Speedy James, a furlong from the finish. She immediately went clear and scored a three and a half length victory.

She was then moved up to Group Three class for the Queen Mary Stakes at Royal Ascot where she was again matched against Pipalong. She had already been described in the press as "arguably the season's fastest two-year-old", while Channon was reported to believe that she was the best juvenile he had trained. Dettori settled her just behind the leaders, then moved her into the lead a furlong out. She once again went quickly clear of her opponents and won by two lengths from Pipalong, who ran on from well off the pace.

It was more than two months before Bint Allayl appeared for her final start, the Lowther Stakes at York, although she was reported to be working impressively at home. In the York race, she ran over six furlongs for the first time and the field was considered a strong one, with her opponents including the Princess Margaret Stakes winner Mythical Girl and Wannabe Grand, who had won the Cherry Hinton Stakes. Ridden by Mick Kinane Bint Allayl was held up in the early stages before moving easily up to take the lead a furlong out and win by a length and three-quarters from Wannabe Grand. After the race, she was made favourite for the 1,000 Guineas, a position she still held at the time of her death.

Plans to run Bint Allayl in the Moyglare Stud Stakes and the Cheveley Park Stakes did not materialise after she suffered a setback in training. Although Bint Allayl did not race again, the form of the Lowther Stakes was boosted when Wannabe Grand won the Group One Cheveley Park Stakes at Newmarket in September.

=== Death ===
Despite a strong belief in the press that Bint Allayl would join the Godolphin Racing team, her owner decided to keep the filly in England with Mick Channon. During the winter, she required surgery on an injured hock but appeared to have fully recovered. On 24 February 1999, Bint Allayl was injured when cantering during light exercise at West Ilsley. She received emergency veterinary treatment, but examinations revealed that she had suffered an untreatable "spiral fracture of her left-fore humerus". She was euthanized that evening.

== Race record ==
| Date | Race | Dist (f) | Course | Class | Prize (£K) | Odds | Runners | Placing | Margin | Time | Jockey | Trainer |
|---|---|---|---|---|---|---|---|---|---|---|---|---|
| 12 May 1998 | EBF Novice Fillies Stakes Stakes | 5 | York | M | 7 | 9/4 | 8 | 2 | 0.25 | 1:00.13 | Frankie Dettori | Mick Channon |
| 26 May 1998 | National Stakes | 5 | Sandown | Listed | 9 | 3/1 | 7 | 1 | 3.5 | 1:02.36 | Frankie Dettori | Mick Channon |
| 17 June 1998 | Queen Mary Stakes | 5 | Ascot | 3 | 29 | 2/1 | 17 | 1 | 2 | 1:02.27 | Frankie Dettori | Mick Channon |
| 20 August 1998 | Lowther Stakes | 6 | York | 2 | 45 | 15/8 | 10 | 1 | 1.75 | 1:10.92 | Michael Kinane | Mick Channon |

== Assessment ==
In the 1998 International Classification, Bint Allayl was assessed at 116, making her the highest rated two-year-old filly in Europe.

She was named European Champion Two-year-old Filly at the Cartier Racing Awards.

== Pedigree ==
Pedigree of Bint Allayl (GB), bay filly, 1996
| Sire Green Desert (USA) 1983 | Danzig; 1977 | Northern Dancer* | Nearctic |
| Sire Green Desert (USA) 1983 | Danzig; 1977 | Northern Dancer* | Natalma |
| Sire Green Desert (USA) 1983 | Danzig; 1977 | Pas de Nom | Admirals Voyage |
| Sire Green Desert (USA) 1983 | Danzig; 1977 | Pas de Nom | Petitioner |
| Sire Green Desert (USA) 1983 | Foreign Courier; 1979 | Sir Ivor | Sir Gaylord |
| Sire Green Desert (USA) 1983 | Foreign Courier; 1979 | Sir Ivor | Attica |
| Sire Green Desert (USA) 1983 | Foreign Courier; 1979 | Courtly Dee | Never Bend |
| Sire Green Desert (USA) 1983 | Foreign Courier; 1979 | Courtly Dee | Tulle |
| Dam Society Lady (IRE) 1990 | Mr. Prospector; 1970 | Raise a Native | Native Dancer |
| Dam Society Lady (IRE) 1990 | Mr. Prospector; 1970 | Raise a Native | Raise You |
| Dam Society Lady (IRE) 1990 | Mr. Prospector; 1970 | Gold Digger | Nashua |
| Dam Society Lady (IRE) 1990 | Mr. Prospector; 1970 | Gold Digger | Sequence |
| Dam Society Lady (IRE) 1990 | La Voyageuse; 1975 | Tentam | Intentionally |
| Dam Society Lady (IRE) 1990 | La Voyageuse; 1975 | Tentam | Tamerett |
| Dam Society Lady (IRE) 1990 | La Voyageuse; 1975 | Fanfreluche | Northern Dancer* |
| Dam Society Lady (IRE) 1990 | La Voyageuse; 1975 | Fanfreluche | Ciboulette (Family:4-g) |

- Bint Allayl was inbred 3 × 4 to Northern Dancer. This means that the stallion appears in both the third and fourth generations of her pedigree.
