= Uchenna Nwosu =

American football player (born 1996)

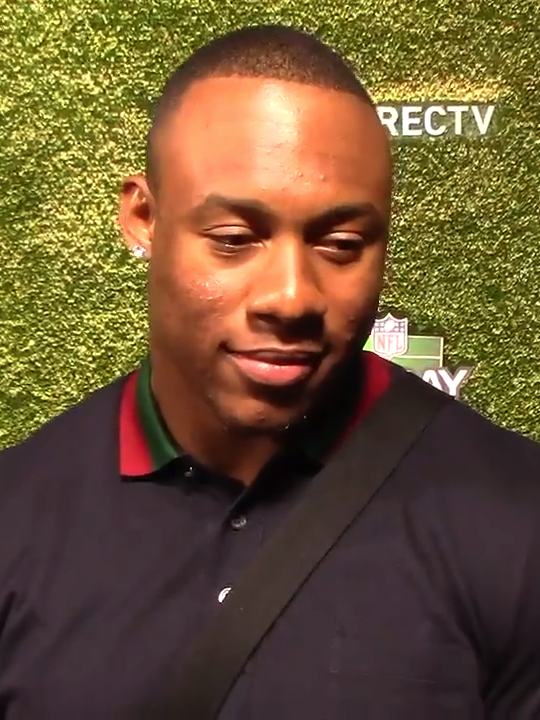
- Nwosu with the Los Angeles Chargers in 2018

No. 7 – Seattle Seahawks
- Position: Outside linebacker
- Roster status: Active

Personal information
- Born: December 28, 1996 (age 29); Carson, California, U.S.
- Listed height: 6 ft 2 in (1.88 m)
- Listed weight: 265 lb (120 kg)

Career information
- High school: Narbonne (Harbor City, California)
- College: USC (2014–2017)
- NFL draft: 2018: 2nd round, 48th overall pick

Career history
- Los Angeles Chargers (2018–2021); Seattle Seahawks (2022–present)

Awards and highlights
- Super Bowl champion (LX); First-team All-Pac-12 (2017)

Career NFL statistics as of 2025
- Tackles: 263
- Sacks: 34.5
- Forced fumbles: 8
- Fumble recoveries: 3
- Pass deflections: 16
- Interceptions: 1
- Stats at Pro Football Reference

Anon Uchenna Nwosu Jr. (born December 28, 1996) is an American professional football outside linebacker for the Seattle Seahawks of the National Football League (NFL). He played college football for the USC Trojans and was selected by the Los Angeles Chargers in the second round of the 2018 NFL draft. At USC, he was named a co-MVP of the team after his senior season.

== College career ==
Nwosu attended USC and played college football under head coaches Steve Sarkisian and Clay Helton. After playing in 12 games during his freshman season, Nwosu was not able to participate in the 2014 Holiday Bowl due to unspecified team rules violations. It was later reported that Nwosu did not enroll for the following spring semester. Despite speculation that he might leave the team, Nwosu was able to take summer classes and rejoin the team in the 2015 season. After his senior season, Nwosu was named a co-MVP alongside quarterback Sam Darnold. He was also on the watchlist for the Butkus Award. Overall, Nwosu played in 44 games in four seasons at USC, recording 169 total tackles, 12.5 sacks, 19 pass deflections, 1 interception, 1 forced fumble, and 1 fumble recovery. Following his senior season, he participated in the 2018 Senior Bowl.

== Professional career ==
Pre-draft measurables
Height	Weight	Arm length	Hand span	Wingspan	40-yard dash	10-yard split	20-yard split	20-yard shuttle	Three-cone drill	Vertical jump	Broad jump	Bench press
6 ft 2 1/8 in (1.88 m)	251 lb (114 kg)	33 5/8 in (0.85 m)	9 in (0.23 m)	6 ft 6 1/4 in (1.99 m)	4.65 s	1.62 s	2.71 s	4.27 s	7.05 s	32 in (0.81 m)	9 ft 11 in (3.02 m)	20 reps
All values from NFL Combine/Pro Day

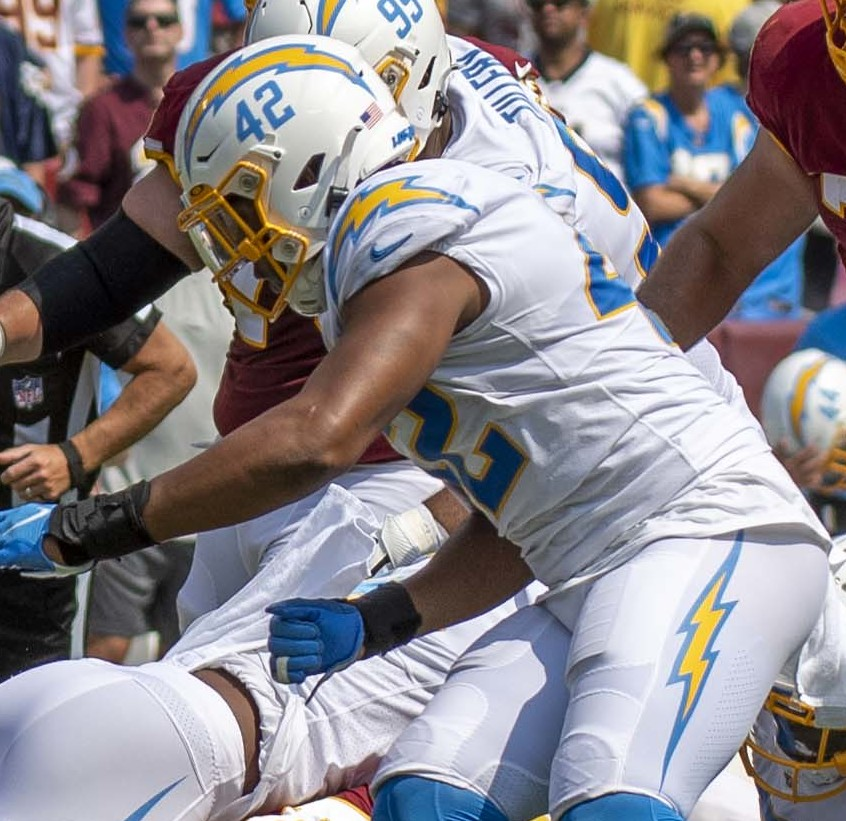
Nwosu with the Chargers in 2021

External videos
- Chargers draft Nwosu 48th overall
- Instant Draft Grade: Uchenna Nwosu

=== Los Angeles Chargers ===
The Los Angeles Chargers selected Nwosu in the second round (48th overall) of the 2018 NFL draft, where he was the sixth linebacker selected in the draft. He played in his hometown of Carson at StubHub Center, the temporary home of the Chargers. On May 13, 2018, the Chargers signed Nwosu to a four-year, $5.75 million contract that includes $3.01 million guaranteed and a signing bonus of $2.26 million. Nwosu entered training camp slated as a backup outside linebacker. Head coach Anthony Lynn named Nwosu the backup strongside linebacker to start the regular season, behind veteran Kyle Emanuel.

==== 2018 ====
He made his professional regular season debut in the Chargers' season-opening 28–38 loss to the Kansas City Chiefs. In Week 2, Nwosu recorded four combined tackles and made his first career sack for a three-yard loss in the first quarter of a 31–20 road victory over the Buffalo Bills. As the Chargers made the playoffs with a 12–4 regular season record, they faced off against the Baltimore Ravens on the road in the Wild Card round. Nwosu made a critical play with 28 seconds left in the game, where he sacked Ravens quarterback Lamar Jackson and forced a fumble recovered by Chargers linebacker Melvin Ingram. Nwosu's first career forced fumble sealed a 23–17 win to advance to the Divisional round. He finished his rookie season with 28 tackles, 3.5 sacks, and one pass defensed in 16 games and three starts.

==== 2019 ====
In the 2019 season, Nwosu had two sacks, 31 total tackles (23 solo), and one pass defended.

==== 2020 ====
In Week 11 of the 2020 season, Nwosu suffered a shoulder injury against the New York Jets, causing him to miss Week 12 against the Bills. On December 26, 2020, he was placed on season-ending injured reserve following a knee injury. Nwosu finished the season appearing in 13 games and four starts, recording 4.5 sacks, 33 tackles, and two passes defensed.

==== 2021 ====
In Week 11 of the 2021 season against the Pittsburgh Steelers, Nwosu sacked quarterback Ben Roethlisberger at Pittsburgh's 25-yard line and forced a fumble which was recovered by Roethlisberger. The play turned a first-and-10 into a second-and-19, although the drive ended with a Pittsburgh touchdown with 4:49 left in the game, as the Chargers narrowly won at home 41–37. In Week 13 against the Cincinnati Bengals, Nwosu recorded a season-high 2.0 sacks and his first career fumble recovery. In the first quarter, Nwosu sacked quarterback Joe Burrow at Cincinnati's 35-yard line and forced a fumble that the former recovered. The subsequent drive allowed the Chargers to score a field goal and widen their lead to 9–0. Los Angeles went on to win 41–22 on the road. In Week 15 against the Kansas City Chiefs, while the Chargers had possession of the ball and led 14–13 in the fourth quarter, Tershawn Wharton forced Joshua Kelley to fumble at Kansas City's 1-yard line and the ball was recovered by Ben Niemann and the Chiefs. On the subsequent drive, quarterback Patrick Mahomes missed his receiver and threw to Nwosu for the latter's first career interception at Kansas City's 4-yard line. The Chargers scored on the next play and brought their lead up to 21–13. The game ended with a Los Angeles loss of 28–34 in overtime. Nwosu finished the season appearing in all 17 games and 15 starts, recording 5.0 sacks, 40 tackles, four passes defensed, two forced fumbles, a fumble recovery and an interception.

=== Seattle Seahawks ===
==== 2022 ====
On March 17, 2022, Nwosu signed a two-year contract with the Seattle Seahawks. In Week 1, Nwosu recorded seven tackles, a sack, and a forced fumble in a 17–16 win over the Denver Broncos at home. To start the second quarter, Nwosu sacked former Seahawks quarterback Russell Wilson on first-and-15. In the third quarter, while Denver was at the Seahawks' 1-yard line on third-and-one, he forced Javonte Williams to fumble and Mike Jackson recovered the ball for Seattle. Nwosu was awarded his first NFC Defensive Player of the Week for his performance. In his first year with the Seahawks, he recorded 6.0 sacks within three games throughout five weeks, leading to career-highs in total tackles (66), sacks (9.5), QB hits (26), forced fumbles (3) and fumble recoveries (2) in 17 games and starts. He made his first career postseason start in a 23–41 road loss to the San Francisco 49ers.

==== 2023 ====
On July 24, 2023, Nwosu signed a three-year contract extension with the Seahawks. In Week 2 on the road against the Detroit Lions, at the start of the second half, he forced David Montgomery to fumble at Detroit's 23-yard line as Jarran Reed recovered the ball for Seattle. The Seahawks subsequently scored on the next drive, bringing them to 14–14, as Seattle went on to win 37–31 in overtime. In Week 4 against the New York Giants, as Seattle led 24–3 with 3:36 left in the game, Nwosu sacked Daniel Jones on fourth-and-five and forced a fumble recovered by Joshua Ezeudu of the Giants. The remainder of the game went scoreless as Seattle won. Nwosu finished the game with 2.0 sacks against Jones, who was sacked a season-high ten times. In Week 7, he suffered a pectoral injury and was placed on season-ending injured reserve on October 26. He finished the season with 16 tackles, 2.0 sacks, and two forced fumbles in six games and starts.

==== 2024 ====
In the 2024 preseason finale against the Cleveland Browns, Wyatt Teller chop blocked Nwosu, which ruled the latter out for the first four weeks of the regular season. Despite this, Seattle elected to keep Nwosu off injured reserve. In Week 5 against the Giants, he made his season premiere, but was subsequently placed on injured reserve for the following seven weeks after suffering a thigh injury in the game. Nwosu finished the season with 14 tackles and 1.0 sack in six games and two starts.

==== 2025 ====
In March 2025, it was reported that Nwosu agreed to a $7 million pay cut and received a $4 million roster bonus, as he underwent knee surgery. On July 17, he was placed on the active/PUP list ahead of training camp. On August 17, Nwosu passed his physical to return to practice. Prior to Week 1, the Seahawks ruled him out for the game. In Week 2, Nwosu made his 2025 season debut. In Week 4 against the Arizona Cardinals, Nwosu led Seattle's defense with 2.0 sacks on quarterback Kyler Murray, posting his first multi-sack game since Week 4 of the 2023 season. This was also a career-high for Nwosu in single-game sacks while not starting the game since Week 7 of the 2020 season (1.5). The Seahawks narrowly won on the road 23–20.

Nwosu returned an interception 45 yards for a touchdown in Super Bowl LX on February 8, 2026, when New England Patriots quarterback Drake Maye was hit by Seahawks corner Devon Witherspoon, sending the ball flying into Nwosu's arms, helping the Seahawks win the game.

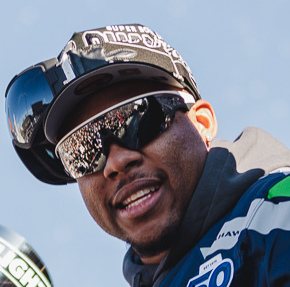
Nwosu at the Seattle Seahawks Super Bowl LX victory parade

== NFL career statistics ==
Legend
	Won the Super Bowl
**Bold**	Career High

=== Regular season ===
Year	Team	Games		Tackles				Interceptions				Fumbles			
Year	Team	GP	GS	Cmb	Solo	Ast	Sck	Int	Yds	TD	PD	FF	FR	Yds	TD
2018	LAC	16	3	28	18	10	3.5	0	–	–	1	0	0	–	–
2019	LAC	16	3	31	23	8	2.0	0	–	–	1	1	0	–	–
2020	LAC	13	4	33	20	13	4.5	0	–	–	2	0	0	–	–
2021	LAC	**17**	15	40	24	16	5.0	**1**	**2**	0	**4**	2	1	-6	0
2022	SEA	**17**	**17**	**66**	**42**	**24**	**9.5**	0	–	–	**4**	**3**	**2**	**4**	0
2023	SEA	6	6	16	12	4	2.0	0	–	–	0	2	0	–	–
2024	SEA	6	2	14	8	6	1.0	0	–	–	1	0	0	–	–
2025	SEA	16	11	35	17	18	7.0	0	–	–	3	0	0	–	–
Career		107	61	263	164	99	34.5	1	2	0	16	8	3	-2	0

=== Postseason ===
Year	Team	Games		Tackles				Interceptions				Fumbles			
Year	Team	GP	GS	Cmb	Solo	Ast	Sck	Int	Yds	TD	PD	FF	FR	Yds	TD
2018	LAC	2	0	**7**	**5**	**2**	0.0	0	–	–	0	**1**	0	–	–
2022	SEA	1	1	3	3	0	0.0	0	–	–	0	0	0	–	–
2025	SEA	**3**	**2**	2	1	1	**1.0**	**1**	**45**	**1**	**1**	0	0	–	–
Career		6	3	12	9	3	1.0	1	45	1	1	1	0	0	0

== Personal life ==
Born in the U.S., Nwosu's name is of Nigerian descent. His full name is Anon Uchenna Nwosu, Jr., which was passed down from his grandfather. The meaning of Uchenna in the Igbo language is God's will.
