= Summer Mood =

Canadian-bred Thoroughbred racehorse

- Sire: Raja Baba
- Grandsire: Bold Ruler
- Dam: Fairly Regal
- Damsire: Viceregal
- Sex: Mare
- Foaled: 1981
- Country: Canada
- Color: Bay
- Breeder: Kinghaven Farms
- Owner: Kinghaven Farms
- Trainer: John J. Tammaro Jr.
- Record: 50: 17-10-9
- Earnings: $542,446

Major wins
- Ontario Debutante Stakes (1983); Shady Well Stakes 1983); Ontario Fashion Stakes (1984, 1985); Valnore Handicap (1984); Etobicoke Handicap (1985); Quick Reward Handicap (1986)

Awards
- Canadian Champion Sprint Horse (1985)

Summer Mood (foaled 1981 in Ontario) is a retired Canadian Thoroughbred racemare who won the Sovereign Award as the 1985 Canadian Champion Sprint Horse of either sex. A daughter of 1980 leading sire in North America, Raja Baba, she was bred and raced by Kinghaven Farms. During her career, Summer Mood won races in Canada and the United States.

Trained by American John J. Tammaro Jr. through 1984, Roger Attfield took over in 1985.

Summer Mood died at age twenty-two in April 2003 as a result of complications during pregnancy.
