= Uchenna =

- Gender: Unisex, but predominantly male
- Language: Igbo

Origin
- Meaning: The will of the father
- Region of origin: Southeast Nigeria

Uchenna // is a common given name of Igbo origin meaning "father's will". Literally, this refers to one's birth father, but it is also interpreted by Christians to mean God. Notable bearers include:

- Uchenna Emedolu (born 1976), Nigerian sprinter
- Uchenna Iroegbu (born 1996), American basketball player
- Uchenna Kanu (born 1997), Nigerian footballer
- Uchenna Nwosu (born 1996), American football player
- Uchenna Uzo (born 1992), Nigerian footballer
