= Is It True (horse) =

American-bred Thoroughbred racehorse

- Sire: Raja Baba
- Grandsire: Bold Ruler
- Dam: Roman Rockette
- Damsire: Proudest Roman
- Sex: Stallion
- Foaled: 1986
- Country: United States
- Colour: Bay
- Breeder: Warner L. Jones, Jr.
- Owner: Eugene V. Klein
- Trainer: D. Wayne Lukas
- Record: 15: 5-2-2
- Earnings: $819,999

Major wins
- Jim Dandy Stakes (1989); Riva Ridge Stakes (1989) Breeders' Cup wins: Breeders' Cup Juvenile (1988)
- Last updated on September 5, 2007

Is It True (May 12, 1986 – February 22, 2007) was an American Thoroughbred racehorse. He is best known for his win in the 1988 Breeders' Cup Juvenile.

== Background ==
Bred by Warner L. Jones at his Hermitage Farm near Goshen, Kentucky, he was purchased by Eugene Klein who handed him over to trainer D. Wayne Lukas for race conditioning.

== Racing career ==
At age two, Is It True made six starts, compiling a 2–2–1 record. He lost three times to future U.S. Racing Hall of Fame inductee Easy Goer, having finished fourth in the Grade I Cowdin Stakes, second in the Grade I Champagne Stakes, and second in a maiden race. However, in their most important meeting of 1988, run on a muddy track at Churchill Downs, Is It True defeated Easy Goer in the Breeders' Cup Juvenile by a little over a length, though Easy Goer won the Eclipse Award for American Champion Two Year Old Male. For owner Eugene Klein, it was his third straight win in the Juvenile. In an August 8, 2007 article, ESPN's Jeremy Plonk wrote that "Easy Goer's loss, on a muddy track at Churchill Downs, in the 1988 Juvenile to Is It True arguably is the biggest upset in the event's 23-year history."

As a three-year-old in 1989, Is It True never made it to the U.S. Triple Crown races. He started nine times, earning three wins and one third-place finish. His most important win came in the Grade II Jim Dandy Stakes at Saratoga Race Course.

== Stud record ==
Retired to stud duty, Is It True stood five seasons in Australia and another five seasons shuttling between Heytesbury Stud near Perth in Western Australia to Walmac International in Kentucky. He sired several stakes race winners, the most notable of which was the American millionaire Grade I and multiple stakes winner, Yes Its True.

== Death ==
While in his paddock on February 22, 2007, he reportedly suffered a fatal heart attack.

== Pedigree ==
Pedigree of Is It True (USA), brown colt, 1986
Sire Raja Baba (USA) 1968	Bold Ruler (USA); 1954	Nasrullah (GB)†	Nearco (ITY)
Sire Raja Baba (USA) 1968	Bold Ruler (USA); 1954	Nasrullah (GB)†	Mumtaz Begum (FRA)
Sire Raja Baba (USA) 1968	Bold Ruler (USA); 1954	Miss Disco (USA)	Discovery (USA)
Sire Raja Baba (USA) 1968	Bold Ruler (USA); 1954	Miss Disco (USA)	Outdone (USA)
Sire Raja Baba (USA) 1968	Missy Baba (USA); 1958	My Babu (FRA)	Djebel (FRA)
Sire Raja Baba (USA) 1968	Missy Baba (USA); 1958	My Babu (FRA)	Perfume (GB)
Sire Raja Baba (USA) 1968	Missy Baba (USA); 1958	Uvira (GB)	Umidwar (GB)
Sire Raja Baba (USA) 1968	Missy Baba (USA); 1958	Uvira (GB)	Lady Lawless (GB)
Dam Roman Rockette (USA) 1977	Proudest Roman (USA); 1968	Never Bend (USA)	Nasrullah (GB)†
Dam Roman Rockette (USA) 1977	Proudest Roman (USA); 1968	Never Bend (USA)	Lalun (USA)
Dam Roman Rockette (USA) 1977	Proudest Roman (USA); 1968	Roman Song (USA)	Roman (USA)
Dam Roman Rockette (USA) 1977	Proudest Roman (USA); 1968	Roman Song (USA)	Quiz Song (USA)
Dam Roman Rockette (USA) 1977	Kitchen Window (USA); 1970	Dead Ahead (USA)	Turn-To (USA)
Dam Roman Rockette (USA) 1977	Kitchen Window (USA); 1970	Dead Ahead (USA)	Siama (USA)
Dam Roman Rockette (USA) 1977	Kitchen Window (USA); 1970	Sally Heather (GB)	Salonaway (IRE)
Dam Roman Rockette (USA) 1977	Kitchen Window (USA); 1970	Sally Heather (GB)	Heather Thatcher (GB)

† indicates inbreeding
