= Ontario Damsel Stakes =

- Class: Restricted Stakes
- Location: Woodbine Racetrack; Toronto, Ontario, Canada
- Inaugurated: 1979
- Race type: Thoroughbred - Flat racing
- Website: woodbineentertainment.com

Race information
- Distance: 1 mile (8 furlongs
- Surface: Turf
- Track: Left-handed
- Qualification: Ontario-bred three-year-old fillies
- Weight: Allowances
- Purse: $150,000

The Ontario Damsel Stakes is a Canadian Thoroughbred horse race run annually during the first week of July at Woodbine Racetrack in Toronto, Ontario. Restricted to three-year-old fillies who were foaled in the Province of Ontario, it is contested on Turf over a distance of one mile (8 furlongs).

Since inception it has been contested at:

- 6.5 furlongs: 1979–1993, 1995–2009
- 7 furlongs: 1994 (at Fort Erie Racetrack)
- 8 furlongs: beginning in 2010

== Records ==
Most wins by a trainer:

- 6 – James Day (1980, 1987, 1990, 1991, 1995, 1996)

Most wins by a jockey:

- 5 – Patrick Husbands (1999, 2000, 2007, 2012, 2022)

Most wins by an owner:

- 8 – Sam-Son Farm (1980, 1987, 1990, 1991, 1995, 1996, 2006, 2015)

== Recent winners ==
Year	Winner	Jockey	Trainer	Owner	Time
2024					
2023	Race Not Held				
2022	Souper Hoity Toity	Patrick Husbands	Mark E. Casse	Live Oak Plantation	1:43.44
2021	Munnyfor Ro	Justin Stein	Kevin Attard	Raroma Stable	1:45.36
2020	Merveilleux	Rafael Manuel Hernandez	Kevin Attard	Al Ulwelling & Bill Ulwelling	1:44.37
2019	Amalfi Coast	Eurico Rosa da Silva	Kevin Attard	Terra Racing Stable	1:34.67
2018	Zestina	Gary Boulanger	Sid C. Attard	Stronach Stables	1:35.91
2017	Financial Recovery	David Moran	Catherine Day Phillps	Narola & Anderson Farm Ontario Inc.	1:36.48
2016	Calling Rhy Rhy	Alan Garcia	Roger Attfield	Robert Harvey	1:35.04
2015	Ready for Romance	Eurico Rosa Da Silva	Malcolm Pierce	Sam-Son Farm	1:34.73
2014	Regal Conqueror	Eurico Rosa Da Silva	Darwin D. Banach	William A. Sorokolit, Sr.	1:34.11
2013	Surtsey	Jermaine V. Bridgmohan	Kevin Attard	Yvonne Schwabe	1:33.80
2012	Dene Court	Patrick Husbands	Mark E. Casse	Melnyk Racing Stable	1:35.14
2011	Bingo	Luis Contreras	Mark E. Casse	Quintessential Racing Florida & Horse'n Around Racing Stable	1:34.86
2010	Barracks Road	Corey Fraser	Mark E. Casse	Melnyk Racing Stables	1:14.97
2009	Mullins Beach	Eurico Rosa da Silva	Malcolm Pierce	Melnyk Racing Stables	1:14.97
2008	Krz Exec	Jerry Baird	Mike DePaulo	Sylon Stable & Partner	1:14.66
2007	Quiet Action	Patrick Husbands	Mark E. Casse	Woodford Racing LLC	1:18.40
2006	Strike Softly	Todd Kabel	Mark Frostad	Sam-Son Farm	1:15.29
2005	Top Ten List	Corey Fraser	Robert P. Tiller	Frank Di Giulio & Robert P. Tiller	1:15.75
2004	Velvet Snow	Corey Fraser	Robert P. Tiller	Frank Di Giulio	1:16.40
2003	Dressed For Action	Robert Landry	Tony Mattine	Shoestring Stable	1:16.75
2002	Cavalier Billie	Robert Landry	Sergio Greco	George Ledson	1:15.70
2001	Highland Mood	David Clark	Robert P. Tiller	Hali Stable & Norseman Racing Stable	1:15.78
2000	Princess Ruckus	Patrick Husbands	Michael Keogh	Gus Schickedanz	1:16.77
1999	Julie's Witt	Patrick Husbands	Norm DeSouza	Norm DeSouza	1:15.77
1998	Barlee Mist	Mickey Walls	Lawrence Wray	Barlee Farm	1:16.20
1997	Inspired Heiress	Steven Bahen	Michael De Paulo	Bernard Xuereb & Charlie Spiteri	1:15.60
1996	Colorful Vices	Todd Kabel	James Day	Sam-Son Farm	1:15.00
1995	Search The Sea	Robert Landry	James Day	Sam-Son Farm	1:16.20
1994	Lady Eton	Robin Platts	MacDonald Benson	T. Kovacevic, F. Peotto & H. Grenn	1:28.60
1993	Bold Ruritana	Don Seymour	Sherri Noakes	A. W. Minshall	1:15.20
1992	Dance For Donna	Raymond Sabourin	Bernard Girault	A. W. Minshall	1:16.20
1991	Dancing With Wings	Sandy Hawley	James Day	Sam-Son Farm	1:16.50
