= Mountain Angel =

2001 song by Dolly Parton

Mountain Angel is a song written and performed by Dolly Parton off of her 2001 album Little Sparrow. This song, including the other tracks from the album, was recorded at ‘Oceanway and The Doghouse’ in Nashville, and at ‘Schnee Studios’ in Los Angeles. Mountain angel is a bluegrass piece with elements of folk. In order to match the success of her previous album, The Grass is Blue, Dolly used the band Nickel Creek and the backing vocals of Alison Krauss to create a new innovative bluegrass sound. The song was performed on several occasions including Larry King: Live to promote Little Sparrow and the Live and Well Tour. It was also written as a tribute, and dedicated, to her father who told her these wild stories in the Great Smoky Mountains.

== Synopsis ==
The song follows a beautiful female protagonist – referred to as a Mountain Angel –who is corrupted by a passerby who she falls in love with and marries. He leaves her and her town as abruptly as he arrived leaving the girl confused and depressed. She eventually loses her mind and flees to the mountains. From the mountains she watches over the town that she once called home. There’s talk about her having a child that didn’t make it past birth, which she mourns from the mountains, by howling. She spends the last years of her life roaming the mountains clothe-less and being referred to as a witch. The juxtaposition is also made, the young girl who was pale and beautiful, who was loved by her family and the wider community, to this deranged woman who lost all she had.

== Concept ==
Mountain Angel is written in the key of D and is completely acoustic. It has a 4/4 time signature with 63 bpm. The song goes for seven minutes, which is unusual for a song. This is because Little Sparrow was released on Dolly’s record label ‘Sugar Hill’ and Dolly had full control over the concept and songs. The speed is andante and maintains this throughout the whole piece, however the dynamic changes several times between each section from piano all the way through to forte. The instrumentation includes three guitars, a double bass, a mandolin, a violin, a banjo, a fiddle, a dulcimer, two whistles, and two backing vocalists. The Vocal range of the song is E – A# above middle C. The vocal is very repetitive throughout the verses; this is done to feature the story of the song rather than distracting the audience with an ever-changing melody.

The song begins with the sound of one of the acoustic guitars plucking the ostinato that played throughout the piece. This is accompanied by another acoustic guitar strumming on every second beat. The main vocalist comes in after two bars and sings in her light, soft tone. She sings for 8 bars. The Violin is introduced in bar 8 of the piece playing a short melisma over the guitars. The banjo is plucked in bar 10 as Dolly finishes singing the first section. The banjo is continually plucked throughout the second section. The double bass is the played in bar 17. As Dolly sings the chorus, the backing vocals join her ‘Oh’s’. The instruments pick up in dynamics during the chorus. One backing vocalist joins the main vocalist during the final line of the chorus- “He lifted her so high, then let her drop”. There are minimal changes throughout the second verse with the exception of the violin become more prominent and the backing vocals highlighting more lines. The bridge breaks down to just two guitars and hints of a violin as the vocals almost speak the lyrics. The mandolin, however, is featured heavily in this part of the track-using glissando. The bridge goes for 16 bars.

The following chorus has backing vocals all the way through and is forte. Verse 3 introduces the flute subtly. And the instrumentation remains fluent and consistent throughout the rest of the piece.
