= Santa Amélia =

Coordinates: 23.2658°S 50.4239°W

- Municipality
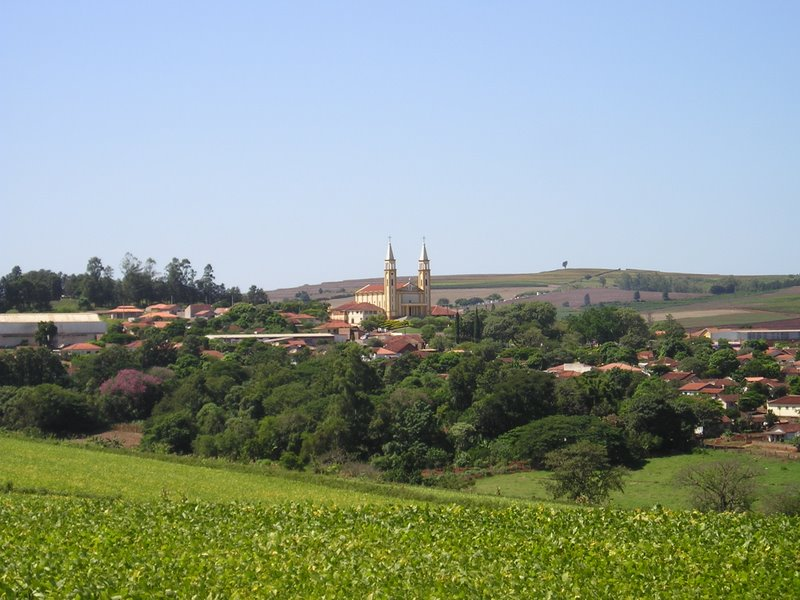

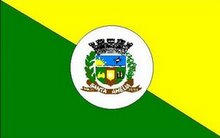
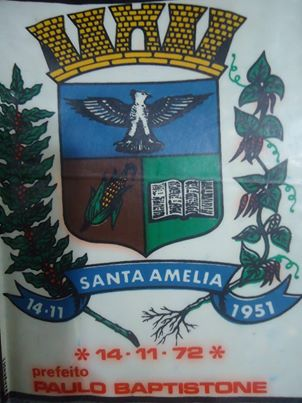
- Flag Coat of arms
- Interactive map of Santa Amélia
- Country: Brazil
- Region: Southern
- State: Paraná
- Mesoregion: Norte Pioneiro Paranaense

Population (2020)
  - Total: 3,266
- Time zone: UTC−3 (BRT)

Santa Amélia is a municipality in the state of Paraná in the Southern Region of Brazil.

== See also ==
- List of municipalities in Paraná
