= Kameko =

American-bred Thoroughbred racehorse

- Racing silks of Qatar Racing
- Sire: Kitten's Joy
- Grandsire: El Prado
- Dam: Sweeter Still
- Damsire: Rock of Gibraltar
- Sex: Colt
- Foaled: 7 April 2017
- Country: United States
- Colour: Bay or brown
- Breeder: Calumet Farm
- Owner: Qatar Racing
- Trainer: Andrew Balding
- Record: 10: 4-2-0
- Earnings: £416,298

Major wins
- Vertem Futurity Trophy (2019); 2000 Guineas (2020); Joel Stakes (2020)

Kameko (foaled 7 April 2017) is an American-bred, British-trained Thoroughbred racehorse. As a two-year-old in 2019 he won his first race and then ran second in both the Solario Stakes and the Royal Lodge Stakes before winning the Vertem Futurity Trophy. On his first appearance as a three-year-old he won the 2000 Guineas in record time. He went on to win the Joel Stakes and finished fourth in both the Sussex Stakes and the International Stakes before being retired to stud at the end of the year.

== Background ==
Kameko is a bay or brown colt with a narrow white blaze and four white socks bred in Kentucky by Calumet Farm. As a yearling in September 2018 he was offered for sale at Keeneland and was bought for $90,000 by Sheikha Melissa Al Fahad on behalf of Sheikh Fahad Al Thani's Qatar Racing. He was sent into training with Andrew Balding at Kingsclere in Hampshire. The horse name of Kameko is taken from Japanese, meaning "child turtle". Kameko was ridden in all of his starts by Oisin Murphy.

He was sired by Kenneth and Sarah Ramsey's stallion Kitten's Joy the U.S. Champion Male Turf Horse of 2004 whose other offspring include Roaring Lion, Stephanie's Kitten, Hawkbill, Bobby's Kitten and Big Blue Kitten.

Kameko's dam Sweeter Still (a half-sister to Kingsbarns) was bred in Ireland but spent most of her racing career in North America where she won five races including the Grade 3 Senorita Stakes in 2008. She was a great-great-granddaughter of Mesopotamia, an Irish broodmare whose other female-line descendants have included Halling, Mastery, Balla Cove and Just The Judge.

== Racing career ==
=== 2019: two-year-old season ===
Kameko made his racecourse debut in a maiden race over seven furlongs at Sandown Park on 25 July when he started at odds of 15/2 in an eight-runner field. After racing in fourth place he took the lead approaching the final furlong and held off a late challenge from the outsider It's Good To Laugh to win by half a length. Five weeks later, over the same course and distance, the colt was stepped up in class and started a 14/1 outsider for the Group 3 Solario Stakes. He tracked the leaders before finishing strongly but failed by a nose to overhaul the odds-on favourite Positive.

At Newmarket Racecourse on 28 September Kameko started 6/5 favourite for the Group 2 Royal Lodge Stakes over one mile. Murphy positioned the colt just behind the leaders before going to the front in the last quarter mile but he was caught near the finish and beaten a neck by the Aidan O'Brien-trained outsider Royal Dornoch. The Group 1 Vertem Futurity Trophy at Doncaster Racecourse on 26 October attracted an unusual five-day entry of twelve, with Kameko matched against eleven colts from the O'Brien stable. As a result of heavy rain at the already waterlogged Yorkshire track the race was abandoned and rescheduled to take place six days later on the synthetic Tapeta surface at Newcastle Racecourse, with entries being reopened. In the new race Kameko started the 11/2 third favourite behind the unbeaten Kinross and Mogul, the winner of the Champions Juvenile Stakes and the best fancied of the five O'Brien runners. The other eight contenders included Verboten (representing Godolphin), Innisfree (Beresford Stakes) and Tammani (Prix Isonomy). The race was the first British Group 1 contest to be run on a synthetic track. Kameko settled just behind the leaders as Royal County Down set the pace, before moving up to take the lead approaching the final furlong. He quickly went clear and despite hanging to the right in the closing stages he won "comfortably" by 3 1/4 lengths from Innisfree. After the race Andrew Balding said "He was impressive, but he's a very good horse who is improving all the time... How far will he stay? A mile and a quarter will be no problem, but we'll have to wait and see whether he stays a mile and a half. If he does, there is only one place he will go. We will probably start him off in the Guineas and go from there. We can still dream."

In the official rating of European two-year-olds for 2019 Kameko was rated the second-best juvenile of the year, level with Earthlight but ten pounds inferior to Pinatubo.

=== 2020: three-year-old season ===
The flat racing season in England was disrupted by the COVID-19 pandemic and the 2000 Guineas was run a month later than usual on 6 June over the Rowley mile at Newmarket. As racing had been cancelled in April and May Kameko went into the race without a previous run but Balding expressed confidence in his trainee saying "He's a big framed horse. He's not the flashiest horse in his routine exercise but he's always been the type that, every time you ask him for a little bit more, he's given and improved for it. Oisin was always saying of Roaring Lion, who was by Kitten's Joy, he seemed to just thrive on racing and every time he ran he just got better and better. I think this horse is very similar."

In the Guineas Kameko went off the 10/1 fourth choice in the betting behind Pinatubo, Arizona (Coventry Stakes) and Wichita (Somerville Tattersall Stakes). The other eleven runners included Military March (Autumn Stakes), Kinross and Royal Dornoch. Murphy settled his mount in mid division as Persuasion set the early pace from Juan Elcano, Starcat and Wichita. Entering the last quarter mile Wichita went to the front with Pinatubo on his left and Military March to his right as Kameko looked to be trapped behind horses and unlikely to obtain a clear run. In the final furlong Kameko forced his way between Wichaita and Military March to gain the advantage and despite hanging right towards the centre of the track he won by a neck. Wichita took second place ahead of Pinatubo and Military March. The winning time of 1:34.72 was a new record for the race. Commenting on his first win in a Classic race Murphy said "It means the absolute world to me. It's the stuff of dreams. Around four furlongs he got a little bit lost but he came home really well. It was a gutsy performance. He hardly blew a candle out afterwards – he must have a tremendous amount of ability". When asked about the colt's prospects for the Epsom Derby Andrew Balding said "To me it looks the obvious choice, there would be a stamina doubt but there's only one way to find out. Probably his optimum trip would be a mile-and-a-quarter, but I think for one day only, he might be able to stay a mile-and-a-half."

On 4 July Kameko started the 5/2 favourite for the 241st running of the Epsom Derby, over 1 1/2 miles at Epsom Racecourse. After tracking the early leaders he moved into fourth place behind the runaway leader Serpentine but was unable to make further progress and came home fourth behind Serpentine, Khalifa Sat and Amhran Na Bhfiann. Later that month the colt was dropped back in distance and matched against older horses for the first time in the Sussex Stakes over one mile at Goodwood Racecourse. He started well before settling behind the leaders but was repeatedly denied a clear run in the straight and finished fourth behind Mohaather, Circus Maximus and Siskin. Three weeks later Kameko was the only three-year-old colt to contest the International Stakes over 10 1/2 furlongs at York Racecourse. He raced towards the rear before moving into second place behind the front-running Ghaiyyath in the straight but faded in the final furlong and came home fourth of the five runners. In the Group 2 Joel Stakes over one mile at Newmarket on 25 September Kameko started the 85/40 second favourite behind Benbatl in a six-runner field which also included Zabeel Prince, Top Rank (Superior Mile), Regal Reality (Sovereign Stakes) and Tilsit (Thoroughbred Stakes). Kameko raced in fourth place as Benbatl set the pace but gained the advantage approaching the final furlong and kept on well to win by half a length from Regal Reality. After the race Andrew Balding said "That was 100% as good as his Guineas win. There was no hiding place today. I don't think we have had a fair crack of the whip with him this year. The horse has not had the campaign that we really wanted. I think there is no doubt he is a miler and that was a really good effort."

For his final race Kameko was sent to the United States for the Breeders' Cup Mile at Keeneland on 7 November and went off the 4/1 favourite but after tracking the leaders he faded in the closing stages and came home seventh of the fourteen runners, beaten 3 1/4 lengths by the upset winner Order of Australia.

Before his run in the Breeders' Cup it had been announced that Kameko would be retired from racing at the end of the year. Andrew Balding commented "Kameko is without doubt the best horse I've trained. He has all the attributes of a top-class miler and is a striking horse to look at. I feel very honoured to have had the opportunity to train a horse of such class. I felt from the very beginning that this could be a special horse. He's the perfect model – he has size, durability and a great character. To ride, he has super balance, a great turn of foot and a good mind – you can put him anywhere in a race. He's a machine".

In the 2020 World's Best Racehorse Rankings, Kameko was rated on 122, making him the equal twenty-first best racehorse in the world.

== Stud career ==
Kameko began his stud career at his owner's Tweenhills Stud in Gloucestershire at a fee of £25,000.

== Pedigree ==
Pedigree of Kameko (USA), bay or brown colt, 2017
Sire Kitten's Joy (USA) 2001	El Prado (IRE); 1989	Sadler's Wells	Northern Dancer
Sire Kitten's Joy (USA) 2001	El Prado (IRE); 1989	Sadler's Wells	Fairy Bridge
Sire Kitten's Joy (USA) 2001	El Prado (IRE); 1989	Lady Capulet	Sir Ivor
Sire Kitten's Joy (USA) 2001	El Prado (IRE); 1989	Lady Capulet	Cap and Bells
Sire Kitten's Joy (USA) 2001	Kitten's First (USA); 1991	Lear Fan	Roberto
Sire Kitten's Joy (USA) 2001	Kitten's First (USA); 1991	Lear Fan	Wac
Sire Kitten's Joy (USA) 2001	Kitten's First (USA); 1991	That's My Hon	L'Enjoleur
Sire Kitten's Joy (USA) 2001	Kitten's First (USA); 1991	That's My Hon	One Lane
Dam Sweeter Still (IRE) 2005	Rock of Gibraltar (IRE); 1999	Danehill (USA)	Danzig
Dam Sweeter Still (IRE) 2005	Rock of Gibraltar (IRE); 1999	Danehill (USA)	Razyana
Dam Sweeter Still (IRE) 2005	Rock of Gibraltar (IRE); 1999	Offshore Boom	Be My Guest (USA)
Dam Sweeter Still (IRE) 2005	Rock of Gibraltar (IRE); 1999	Offshore Boom	Push A Button
Dam Sweeter Still (IRE) 2005	Beltisaal (FR); 1994	Belmez (USA)	El Gran Senor
Dam Sweeter Still (IRE) 2005	Beltisaal (FR); 1994	Belmez (USA)	Grace Note (FR)
Dam Sweeter Still (IRE) 2005	Beltisaal (FR); 1994	Ittisaal (GB)	Caerleon (USA)
Dam Sweeter Still (IRE) 2005	Beltisaal (FR); 1994	Ittisaal (GB)	House Tie (IRE) (Family: 10-c)
