= Hawkbill (Thoroughbred racehorse) =

American-bred Thoroughbred racehorse

- Racing silks of Godolphin
- Sire: Kitten's Joy
- Grandsire: El Prado
- Dam: Trensa
- Damsire: Giant's Causeway
- Sex: Stallion
- Foaled: 6 March 2013
- Country: United States
- Colour: Chestnut
- Breeder: Helen K Groves Revokable Trust
- Owner: Godolphin
- Trainer: Charlie Appleby
- Record: 24: 10-2-6
- Earnings: £3,544,995

Major wins
- Newmarket Stakes (2016); Tercentenary Stakes (2016); Eclipse Stakes (2016); Aston Park Stakes (2017); Princess of Wales's Stakes (2017); Dubai City of Gold (2018); Dubai Sheema Classic (2018)

Hawkbill (foaled 6 March 2013) is an American-bred, British-trained Thoroughbred racehorse. During his racing career he competed in England, Ireland, France, Germany, Canada and Dubai. In 2015 he was beaten on his first two appearances but then recorded three consecutive wins in minor races. As a three-year-old in 2016 he made rapid progress, taking his winning run to six with victories in the Newmarket Stakes, Tercentenary Stakes and Eclipse Stakes. As a four-year-old he won the Aston Park Stakes and Princess of Wales's Stakes and was placed in the Coronation Cup, Grosser Preis von Berlin and Northern Dancer Turf Stakes. He began his fourth season by winning the Dubai City of Gold and followed up by recording his most valuable success when he took the Dubai Sheema Classic.

== Background ==
Hawkbill is a chestnut colt with a broad white blaze and long white socks on his hind legs bred in Kentucky by the Helen K Groves Revokable Trust. As a yearling in September 2014 Hawkbill was offered for sale at Keeneland and bought for $350,000 by the John Ferguson on behalf of Sheikh Mohammed's Godolphin organisation. The colt was sent to race in Europe and entered training with Charlie Appleby at Godolphin's British base in Newmarket.

He was sired by Kenneth and Sarah Ramsey's stallion Kitten's Joy the U.S. Champion Male Turf Horse of 2004. His other offspring include Stephanie's Kitten, Bobby's Kitten and Big Blue Kitten. Hawkbill's dam Trensa won three races from nineteen starts in the United States between 2006 and 2010. Her grand-dam Mochila was a half-sister to Cozzene.

== Racing career ==
=== 2015: two-year-old season ===
Hawkbill began his racing career by finishing ninth of ten in a five furlong maiden race at Newbury Racecourse on 17 April. He was of the course for two months before returning in a similar event over seven furlongs at Kempton Park Racecourse in which he finished third behind They Seek Him Here after leading for most of the way. In a maiden on the Polytrack surface at Lingfield Park Racecourse in July he was partnered for the first time by William Buick, who became his regular jockey. Starting the 11/10 favourite he took the lead a furlong out and won by a neck from Lazzam to record his first victory. Hawkbill's two remaining starts of 2015 were on the Polytrack course at Kempton. On 18 August he carried top weight of 133 pounds in a nursery handicap and won by three and a quarter lengths after leading for most of the way and drawing clear in the straight. He was then moved up in class and distance for a race over one mile on 9 September. After leading from the start and going three lengths clear early in the straight he was hard-pressed in the final strides before prevailing by a head from the Richard Hannon Jr.-trained Steel of Madrid.

At the end of the season Hawkbill was sent to spend the winter at Godolphin's base in Dubai.

=== 2016: three-year-old season ===
On his first appearance of 2016, Hawkbill started a 14/1 outsider in an eight-runner field for the Listed Newmarket Stakes over ten furlongs at Newmarket Racecourse in which his opponents included the Prix Jean-Luc Lagardère runner-up Cymric. After tracking the leaders he went to the front approaching the final furlong and won by one and a quarter lengths from Abdon with the favourite Sky Kingdom in third. The colt was stepped up in class again at Royal Ascot when he was one of nine colts to contest the Group Three Tercentenary Stakes on 16 June. Abdon and the Cocked Hat Stakes runner-up Prize Money started 4/1 joint favourites ahead of the unbeaten Long Island Sound, with Hakwbill next in the betting on 11/2 alongside Blue de Vega (third in the Irish 2000 Guineas). After racing in third place behind the outsider Race Day, Hawkbill took the lead approaching the final furlong and stayed on to win by one and a quarter lengths from Prize Money, with a gap of almost three lengths back to Long Island Sound in third. After the race Appleby commented "We didn’t know how good he was until he went to Newmarket and since then he's thrived. It was a great ride from William and a great win for the team".

On 2 July Hawkbill was moved up in class and was matched against older horses for the first time in the Eclipse Stakes at Sandown Park Racecourse. The odds-on favourite was the Irish colt The Gurkha who had won the Poule d'Essai des Poulains before being narrowly beaten in the St James's Palace Stakes. Hawkbill was next in the betting alongside My Dream Boat (Prince of Wales's Stakes) and Time Test (Joel Stakes). The other three runners were Western Hymn (Brigadier Gerard Stakes), Bravery (fourth in the Irish 2000 Guineas) and Time Test's pacemaker Countermeasure. Hawkbill tracked the leader Countermeasure before taking the lead two furlongs out but was soon challenged and headed by The Gurkha. The two colts engaged in a prolonged struggle in the closing stages before Hawkbill gained the advantage in the final strides and won by half a length. Time Test took third ahead of Countermeasure. Buick commented "Hawkbill is a very good horse. He goes on the ground very well and the future is very bright for him". John Ferguson added "He's a horse that has improved and the sky is the limit for him. I think it's going to be a really enjoyable time now thinking where to go. There's no hurry and the horse has a great future in front of him."

Hawkbill bypassed the King George VI and Queen Elizabeth Stakes and reappeared in the International Stakes at York Racecourse on 17 August. Starting the 6/1 second favourite in a strong field he tracked the leaders but weakened in the last quarter mile and finished eighth of the twelve runners behind Postponed. In the Irish Champion Stakes at Leopardstown Racecourse on 16 September he started a 16/1 outsider and finished ninth, twelve lengths behind the winner Almanzor. He ended his season with a trip to Germany, where he finished third behind the four-year-olds Guignol and Racing History in the Grosser Preis von Bayern over 2400 metres at Munich on 1 November.

=== 2017: four-year-old season ===
Hawkbill began his third campaign on 1 May in the Prix Ganay, run that year at Saint-Cloud Racecourse. He briefly took the lead in the straight but was outsprinted in the closing stages and finished fifth of the seven runners behind Cloth of Stars. Nineteen days later the colt was dropped in class for the Group 3 Aston Park Stakes over one and a half miles on soft ground at Newbury Racecourse and started 3/1 favourite against five opponents. Buick sent him into the lead from the start and he was never seriously challenged, winning by two lengths from My Dream Boat. He then finished third to Highland Reel and Frontiersman in the Coronation Cup before running sixth behind Zarak in the Grand Prix de Saint-Cloud. In the Princess of Wales's Stakes at Newmarket 13 July he started at odds of 7/1 against five opponents including Wings of Desire, Frontiersman, Algometer (Cocked Hat Stakes) and Western Hymn. He led from the start and won by three quarters of a length from Frontiersman. In his two remaining starts of 2017 Hawkbill finished runner-up to Dschingis Secret in the Grosser Preis von Berlin and was then sent to Canada where he was beaten a head by Johnny Bear in the Northern Dancer Turf Stakes.

=== 2018: five-year-old season ===
Hawkbill was sent Dubai in early 2018 and began his campaign in the Group 2 Dubai City of Gold over 2400 metres on 10 March and started the 2/1 favourite against twelve opponents. Ridden by Buick he took the lead 300 metres from the finish and won by a head from his stablemate Frontiersman. Three weeks later over the same course and distance the horse contested the Group 1 Sheema Classic in which he faced nine opponents including Rey de Oro (Japanese Derby), Cloth of Stars, Poet's Word, Idaho and Satono Crown. The start was delayed when Hawkbill contrived to get his leg over the top of the starting stalls and had to be reloaded. Sent into the lead from the start by Buick, Hawkbill opened up a clear advantage approaching the straight and won "comfortably" by three lengths from Poet's Word. After the race Buick said "Physically he did well over the winter and we’ve always thought a lot of him. He relaxed well in front and was in a lovely rhythm. It was going to take a good one to get past him".

On his return to Europe Hawkbill ran poorly when finishing a distant fifth behind Cracksman in the Coronation Cup on 1 June but produced a slightly better effort at Royal Ascot later that month when he ran third to Poet's Word and Cracksman in the Prince of Wales's Stakes. In July the horse returned to Sandown as he attempted to repeat his 2016 success in the Eclipse Stakes. He led for most of the way but was overtaken approaching the final furlong and came home fourth behind Roaring Lion, Saxon Warrior and Cliffs of Moher, four lengths behind the winner. After a break of over two months Hawkbill was sent to Canada for a second time but ran poorly when unplaced behind Johnny Bear in the Northern Dancer Turf Stakes on 15 September.

Hawkbill's retirement from racing was announced on 9 October. Charlie Appleby commented "He was a wonderful racehorse who will be remembered for bringing Moulton Paddocks to the international stage. He was an ambassador for Godolphin who gave everybody connected with him immense pleasure. He was hugely popular in the yard. Now he is set to enjoy a well-deserved retirement".

== Stud career ==
Hawkbill commenced stallion duties in 2020 for Godolphin at their Darley Stud in Japan for a fee of 1 million yen.

== Pedigree ==
Pedigree of Hawkbill (USA), chestnut horse, 2013
| Sire Kitten's Joy (USA) 2001 | El Prado (IRE); 1989 | Sadler's Wells | Northern Dancer |
| Sire Kitten's Joy (USA) 2001 | El Prado (IRE); 1989 | Sadler's Wells | Fairy Bridge |
| Sire Kitten's Joy (USA) 2001 | El Prado (IRE); 1989 | Lady Capulet | Sir Ivor |
| Sire Kitten's Joy (USA) 2001 | El Prado (IRE); 1989 | Lady Capulet | Cap and Bells |
| Sire Kitten's Joy (USA) 2001 | Kitten's First (USA); 1991 | Lear Fan | Roberto |
| Sire Kitten's Joy (USA) 2001 | Kitten's First (USA); 1991 | Lear Fan | Wac |
| Sire Kitten's Joy (USA) 2001 | Kitten's First (USA); 1991 | That's My Hon | L'Enjoleur |
| Sire Kitten's Joy (USA) 2001 | Kitten's First (USA); 1991 | That's My Hon | One Lane |
| Dam Trensa (USA) 2004 | Giant's Causeway (USA); 1997 | Storm Cat | Storm Bird |
| Dam Trensa (USA) 2004 | Giant's Causeway (USA); 1997 | Storm Cat | Terlingua |
| Dam Trensa (USA) 2004 | Giant's Causeway (USA); 1997 | Mariah's Storm | Rahy |
| Dam Trensa (USA) 2004 | Giant's Causeway (USA); 1997 | Mariah's Storm | Immense |
| Dam Trensa (USA) 2004 | Serape (USA); 1988 | Fappiano | Mr. Prospector |
| Dam Trensa (USA) 2004 | Serape (USA); 1988 | Fappiano | Killaloe |
| Dam Trensa (USA) 2004 | Serape (USA); 1988 | Mochila | In Reality |
| Dam Trensa (USA) 2004 | Serape (USA); 1988 | Mochila | Ride the Trails (Family: 4-m) |
