= Kitten's Joy =

American-bred Thoroughbred racehorse

- Sire: El Prado
- Grandsire: Sadler's Wells
- Dam: Kitten's First
- Damsire: Lear Fan
- Sex: Stallion
- Foaled: May 8, 2001
- Died: July 15, 2022 (aged 21)
- Country: United States
- Colour: Chestnut
- Breeder: Kenneth L. and Sarah K. Ramsey
- Owner: Kenneth L. and Sarah K. Ramsey
- Trainer: Dale L. Romans
- Record: 14: 9-4-0
- Earnings: $2,075,791

Major wins
- Palm Beach Stakes (2004); Tropical Park Derby (2004); American Turf Stakes (2004); Virginia Derby (2004); Secretariat Stakes (2004); Joe Hirsch Turf Classic (2004); Firecracker Breeders' Cup Handicap (2005)

Awards
- U.S. Champion Male Turf Horse (2004); Leading sire in North America (2013, 2018)

Honours
- Grade III Kitten's Joy Stakes held at Gulfstream Park
- Last updated on May 12, 2020

Kitten's Joy (May 8, 2001 – July 15, 2022) was a Thoroughbred racehorse who was a multiple graded stakes winner and the American Champion Turf Horse of 2004. Since retiring to stud, he became one of the leading sires in North America and has had great success with his runners in Europe.

== Background ==
Kitten's Joy was a chestnut stallion who was bred by Ken and Sarah Ramsey at their farm in Nicholasville, Kentucky. Sarah Ramsay's nickname "Kitten" was the basis of the name of the first horse she ever bought, Kitten's First. Kitten's First injured herself in her second start and was retired from racing, but proved to be a "Blue Hen" broodmare. Kitten's First was the dam of not only Kitten's Joy, but also of Precious Kitten (Grade I winner, earned over $1.1 million) and Justenuffheart (stakes winner and successful broodmare). Kitten's First broke a hip during her racing career, resulting in narrowing of her pelvis. She delivered Justenuffheart in 1995 but several of her subsequent foals did not survive. In 2001, Ramsey opted to have a Cesarean section performed on Kitten's First – Kitten's Joy was the resultant foal. Kitten's First produced two more foals via c-section, including Precious Kitten, before she was euthanized in 2006 due to laminitis.

Kitten's Joy was sired by El Prado, who in turn was sired by leading Irish sire, Sadler's Wells. El Prado was co-champion as a two-year-old in Ireland with St Jovite, and the first son of Sadler's Wells to retire to stud in North America. El Prado was the leading sire in North America in 2002 thanks in part to multiple Grade I winner Medaglia d'Oro, who went on to become a major sire worldwide.

The Ramseys once put Kitten's Joy up for sale at auction, at the 2003 Ocala Two-Year-Olds-in-Training Sale, with a reserve of $99,000. "We had a live bid of $95,000", said Ramsay. "He (the bidder) called me up after the sale, and didn't want to go to $100,000. We came within $5,000 of selling him." The colt subsequently raced with the Ramseys' colors, trained by Dale Romans.

== Racing career ==
Ramsey racing colors

Kitten's Joy made his first start on August 20, 2003, at Saratoga racetrack, finishing fifth in a five-furlong sprint on the dirt. On September 24 at Belmont Park, he improved to finish second in a one-mile race on the dirt, beaten by a neck. For his third start on October 9, Kitten's Joy was switched to the turf and responded with a 4 1/2-length victory, followed up by another win on the turf at Churchill Downs on November 16.

Kitten's Joy started his three-year-old season on January 1, 2004, in the Grade III Tropical Park Derby at Calder racetrack, winning by 4 1/2 lengths. "He's a pretty easy horse to ride", said jockey Jerry Bailey. "He puts you in the race where you want to be, then he comes off the bridle and relaxes until you call on him. I told [Romans], I thought he had a kick left, but I didn't think it would be as explosive as it was."

Given the win, Ramsey wanted to try the horse on the dirt again in hopes of qualifying for the Kentucky Derby. Accordingly, Bailey rode Kitten's Joy in a six-furlong workout on the dirt, in which Kitten's Joy spotted stakes-winner Dubai Sheikh a six-length lead but still ran him down. While it was an impressive performance, Bailey advised Ramsay that the horse was better on grass and should not be tried on dirt again.

On February 21, Kitten's Joy returned to win the Palm Beach Stakes at Gulfstream Park by a length. He followed this up with a win on April 30 in the American Turf Stakes at Churchill Downs before losing his first race since moving to the turf, finishing second in the Jefferson Cup Stakes on June 12.

In the Virginia Derby on July 10 at Colonial Downs, Kitten's Joy faced off with favored Artie Schiller. The two tracked the early leaders before Artie Schiller made his move entering the stretch. Kitten's Joy responded and the two dueled for about a furlong before Kitten's Joy finally pulled away to win by over two lengths. It was his fourth Grade III win of the year.

Kitten's Joy then stepped up to the Grade I level in the Secretariat Stakes at Arlington Park on August 14. He was the 4-5 favorite and rewarded bettors with a "convincing" victory by over three lengths. His time for the 1 1/4-mile race was 1:59.65, which was 2/5 of a second faster than older horses ran in the Arlington Million earlier that day. The time is a still-standing stakes record.

In the Joe Hirsch Turf Classic Invitational Handicap at Belmont Park on October 2, Kitten's Joy faced older horses for the first time, including European stars Magistretti and Maktub, Arlington Million winner Kicken Kris, and United Nations winner Request for Parole. It was also his first start at 12 furlongs, a distance at which European-bred horses typically excel. Kitten's Joy responded with an "authoritative" win by 2 1/2 lengths on a yielding turf course. "What amazed me about him is his turn of foot, acceleration and how kind he is during the race", Romans said. "When you ask him, he just turns it on. This is the best race he's run so far. I thought he would relish a mile and a half, and he showed that he did today."

In his final start of the year, Kitten's Joy ran second in the 2004 Breeders' Cup Turf, finishing 1 3/4 lengths behind Better Talk Now. Kitten's Joy had trouble handling the wet turf course but finally started to make up ground only to be bumped by the eventual winner in the stretch drive. "It completely stopped our momentum", said jockey John Velazquez. "If we had a clean trip, we would have won it." Kitten's Joy dropped back to third but then rallied to beat Powerscourt for second place by a neck. A claim of interference was disallowed by the stewards. "The whole time around he looked like he struggled", said Romans. "He tried the whole way. He showed the heart of a champion." He was voted the Eclipse Award for Outstanding Male Turf Horse.

Kitten's Joy started twice as a four-year-old, finishing first in the Firecracker Handicap (now known as the Wise Dan Stakes). He finished second to Powerscourt in the Arlington Million, considered by some to be the turf race equivalent of the Kentucky Derby. He was retired after the Million due to damaged cartilage in his left knee.

== Stud career ==
Kitten's Joy was retired to stud at Ramsey Farm in 2006 for an initial fee of $25,000. As a turf runner with a turf pedigree, he was not originally fashionable in the North American breeding market, which prizes precocious dirt runners. Rather than relying on outside breeders, Ramsey built a broodmare band of over 100 mares to support Kitten's Joy, often purchasing them in claiming races. The gamble to invest so heavily in an unproven stallion started to pay off when the first offspring of Kitten's Joy reached the racetrack in 2009. Kitten's Joy was the 5th ranked freshman sire in 2009, became the leading 3rd crop and champion Juvenile sire in 2011 and led the North America general sire listing in 2013. In 2014, his stud fee was increased to $100,000.

In 2017, Ramsay announced that he was planning to sell Kitten's Joy, probably to European interests, feeling that the stallion was not getting the respect he deserved from North American breeders. Eventually, Ramsay sold a 50% interest to Hill 'n' Dale Farm, where the stallion stood the 2018 season for a fee of $60,000. Kitten's Joy earned his second leading sire title in 2018, after which his fee was increased to $75,000 for 2019.

Kitten's Joy has enjoyed his greatest success with mares who are bred along similar lines to him, with Northern Dancer and/or Roberto in their pedigrees. According to Ramsey Farm manager Mark Partridge, he also works best with well-balanced, strong mares and has enjoyed less success with fine-boned mares. According to trainer Chad Brown, who has trained many offspring of Kitten's Joy, one of the secrets to their success is their temperament.

"To be a top racehorse, you have to be physically gifted, but it also takes an incredible mental constitution. You have to be focused to train every day. One after another, the Kitten's Joys carry that trait. They’re tough-minded horses. They never get sour. They can’t wait to train, and they drag their riders to get to the track."

The first 16 stakes winners sired by Kitten's Joy were bred by the Ramseys and most of them also raced for the Ramseys. Even as his reputation grew, the Ramsey's were still the breeders of 54 of his first 68 stakes winners. Three of Kitten's Joy's progeny won Grade I races on the same day, August 17, 2013 – Big Blue Kitten (Sword Dancer Invitational Handicap), Real Solution (Arlington Million), and Admiral Kitten (Secretariat Stakes) – all of them Ramsey homebreds. As a result, when Kitten's Joy led the sire list in 2013, the Ramseys were also the leading breeders and owners, winning Eclipse Awards in these categories. Over time though, more of his offspring were produced from outside mares, including his first Group 1 winner in Europe, Hawkbill, who won the 2016 Eclipse Stakes.

Kitten's Joy died on July 15, 2022, in his paddock at Hill 'n' Dale at Xalapa in Paris, Kentucky, of what the farm described as an apparent heart attack.

=== Major winners ===
c = colt, f = filly, g = gelding

Foaled	Name	Sex	Major wins
2008	Big Blue Kitten	c	United Nations Stakes, Sword Dancer Invitational Stakes, Joe Hirsch Turf Classic Invitational Stakes
2009	Stephanie's Kitten	f	Breeders' Cup Juvenile Fillies Turf, Just A Game Stakes, Flower Bowl Invitational Stakes, Breeders' Cup Filly and Mare Turf
2009	Diplomat	g	New York Turf Writers Cup
2009	Real Solution	c	Arlington Million, Manhattan Handicap
2010	Admiral Kitten	c	Secretariat Stakes
2010	Kitten's Dumplings	f	Queen Elizabeth II Challenge Cup Stakes
2011	Bobby's Kitten	c	Breeders' Cup Turf Sprint
2011	Divisidero	c	Joe Hirsch Turf Classic Invitational Stakes
2012	Chiropractor	c	Hollywood Derby
2013	Hawkbill	c	Eclipse Stakes, Dubai Sheema Classic
2013	Sadler's Joy	c	Sword Dancer Stakes
2014	Oscar Performance	c	Breeders' Cup Juvenile Turf, Belmont Derby, Secretariat Stakes, Woodbine Mile
2015	Gendarme	c	Sprinters Stakes
2015	Roaring Lion	c	Eclipse Stakes, International Stakes, Irish Champion Stakes, Queen Elizabeth II Stakes
2016	Henley's Joy	c	Belmont Derby
2017	Kameko	c	Vertem Futurity Trophy, 2000 Guineas
2017	Tripoli	c	Pacific Classic Stakes

=== Statistics ===
By Racing Year
Year	North American Rank	Winners	Stakes Winners	Graded Stakes Winners	Chief Earner	Earnings^{†}
2009	#5 first-crop	19	5	1	William's Kitten	$1,156,779
2010	111	66	2	1	Dean's Kitten	$2,551,584
2011	10	104	15	5	Stephanie's Kitten	$6,801,569
2012	19	133	14	6	Politicallycorrect	$6,533,591
2013	1	135	24	11	Big Blue Kitten	$11,330,908
2014	3	149	25	9	Bobby's Kitten	$11,713,264
2015	3	134	13	7	Stephanie's Kitten	$11,616,036
2016	5	149	17	10	Camelot Kitten	$10,798,048
2017	3	174	16	13	Sadler's Joy	$13,155,517
2018	1	177	17	9	Hawkbill	$18,647,331
2019	10	123	14	7	Henley's Joy	$10,491,985

^{†} Prior to 2015, the Leading Sire Lists published by The Blood-Horse excluded earnings from Hong Kong and Japan due to the potential distortion caused by higher purse sizes. Starting in 2015, earnings from Hong Kong and Japan are included on an adjusted basis.

== Pedigree ==
Pedigree of Kitten's Joy, chestnut horse, May 8, 2001
Sire El Prado (IRE) 1989	Sadler's Wells; 1981	Northern Dancer	Nearctic
Sire El Prado (IRE) 1989	Sadler's Wells; 1981	Northern Dancer	Natalma
Sire El Prado (IRE) 1989	Sadler's Wells; 1981	Fairy Bridge	Bold Reason
Sire El Prado (IRE) 1989	Sadler's Wells; 1981	Fairy Bridge	Special
Sire El Prado (IRE) 1989	Lady Capulet; 1974	Sir Ivor	Sir Gaylord
Sire El Prado (IRE) 1989	Lady Capulet; 1974	Sir Ivor	Attica
Sire El Prado (IRE) 1989	Lady Capulet; 1974	Caps and Bells	Tom Fool
Sire El Prado (IRE) 1989	Lady Capulet; 1974	Caps and Bells	Ghazni
Dam Kitten's First 1991	Lear Fan; 1981	Roberto	Hail To Reason
Dam Kitten's First 1991	Lear Fan; 1981	Roberto	Bramalea
Dam Kitten's First 1991	Lear Fan; 1981	Wac	Lt. Stevens
Dam Kitten's First 1991	Lear Fan; 1981	Wac	Belthazar
Dam Kitten's First 1991	That's My Hon; 1983	L'Enjoleur	Buckpasser
Dam Kitten's First 1991	That's My Hon; 1983	L'Enjoleur	Fanfreluche
Dam Kitten's First 1991	That's My Hon; 1983	One Lane	Prince John
Dam Kitten's First 1991	That's My Hon; 1983	One Lane	Danger Ahead (family: 2-d)
