= Big Blue Kitten =

American-bred Thoroughbred racehorse

- Sire: Kitten's Joy
- Grandsire: El Prado
- Dam: Spent Gold
- Damsire: Unaccounted For
- Sex: Stallion
- Foaled: May 1, 2008
- Country: United States
- Colour: Bay
- Breeder: Kenneth and Sarah Ramsey
- Owner: Kenneth and Sarah Ramsey
- Trainer: Chad Brown
- Record: 33:14-8-5
- Earnings: $2,983,350

Major wins
- National Museum of Racing Hall of Fame Stakes (2011); United Nations Stakes (2013, 2015); Sword Dancer Invitational Stakes (2013); Lure Stakes (2014); Fort Marcy Handicap (2015); Joe Hirsch Turf Classic Stakes (2015)

Awards
- American Champion Male Turf Horse (2015)
- Last updated on July 16, 2021

Big Blue Kitten (foaled May 1, 2008) is an American Thoroughbred racehorse who specialised in turf races. Unraced as a juvenile, he finished third on his debut in 2011 and then went on a five-race winning streak, culminating in a victory in the Grade II National Museum of Racing Hall of Fame Stakes. After winning one minor race as a four-year-old, he emerged as a top-class turf performer in 2013 when his wins included the United Nations Stakes and the Sword Dancer Invitational Stakes. His only win of consequence in 2014 came in the Lure Stakes, but he returned to his best as a seven-year-old in 2015 winning the Fort Marcy Handicap, a second United Nations Stakes, and the Joe Hirsch Turf Classic Invitational Stakes. Apart from his victories, he finished second in the Arlington Million and third in the Breeders' Cup Turf. His performances earned him the title of American Champion Male Turf Horse for 2015.

== Background ==
Big Blue Kitten is a bay horse bred and owned by Kenneth and Sarah Ramsey. He was sired by the Ramsey stallion Kitten's Joy, the U.S. Champion Male Turf Horse of 2004. His dam Spent Gold made no impact on the track, failing to win in three races as a two-year-old in 1999. She was a granddaughter of Mystical Mood, who won the Schuylerville Stakes and produced Citation Handicap winner Fair Judgment.

The Ramseys sent their horse into training with Chad Brown. Although Big Blue Kitten is an entire male horse he is officially described as a ridgling, as he has an undescended testicle. The "Big Blue" part of his name is a reference to the sports teams of the University of Kentucky, Ken Ramsey's alma mater.

== Racing career ==
=== 2011: three-year-old season ===
Big Blue Kitten began his racing career by finishing third in a maiden race at Gulfstream Park on February 21 and then won in a similar event over nine furlongs at the same track on 20 March. He next won a minor turf race at Keeneland in April and gained further successes at Belmont Park in May and July to take his winning run to four. On August 12 at Saratoga Race Course, Big Blue Kitten was stepped up in class for the Grade II National Museum of Racing Hall of Fame Stakes and started second favorite in a seven-runner field. Ridden by John Velazquez, he tracked the leaders before moving up on the rail, taking the lead in the straight and winning by one and a quarter lengths from Perregaux. Commenting on the horse's successful step up in class, Ramsey said, "We’ve offered this horse for a claiming price three times and no one claimed him. No more claimers!" The colt was then off the course for four months before finishing third in a minor race at Gulfstream in December.

=== 2012: four-year-old season ===
On his 2012 debut, Big Blue Kitten was moved up to Grade I level for the Gulfstream Park Handicap and finished third behind Get Stormy and Hollinger. In the Ben Ali Stakes at Keeneland in April, he finished a distant second to the five-year-old gelding Wise Dan. He was then sent to England to contest the Prince of Wales's Stakes at Royal Ascot in June. Starting a 50/1 outsider, he briefly took the lead a quarter of a mile out before fading in the final furlong to finish tenth of the eleven runners behind So You Think. On his only other start of the year, he won a minor race at Gulfstream in December.

=== 2013: five-year-old season ===
In 2013, Big Blue Kitten began his campaign by finishing third to Mucho Mas Macho in the Fort Lauderdale Stakes and then won minor events at Gulfstream in March and Churchill Downs in May. In June, he moved to Monmouth Park where he was partnered for the first time by Joe Bravo, who became his regular jockey. He finished second to Boisterous in the Monmouth Stakes and then contested the Grade I United Nations Stakes over one mile and three furlongs on 6 July. Breeders' Cup Turf winner Little Mike started favorite, with Big Blue Kitten second choice in the betting at odds of 2.5/1, and the 2011 winner Teaks North at 7.6/1. After being restrained by Bravo in the early stages, he made rapid progress on the rail in the straight, took the lead in the closing stages, and won by one and a quarter lengths from Teaks North. Chad Brown described Bravo's ride as "one for his highlight reel" and added that "this horse will run as far as you want".

On August 17, Big Blue Kitten was one of twelve horses to contest the Grade I Sword Dancer Invitational Stakes over one and a half miles at Saratoga. His opponents included Boisterous, Twilight Eclipse (Pan American Stakes), Stormy Lord (Connaught Cup), Al Khali (Bowling Green Handicap), and Optimizer (Kent Stakes). After racing towards the rear of the field, he began to make progress on the inside but failed to obtain a clear run in the straight. Bravo switched him to the outside in the final furlong, and Big Blue Kitten produced a strong late run to take the lead and win "readily" by a length from Twilight Eclipse. Brown said that he had been "super confident" before the race while Bravo commented, "the happiest I was was turning for home. I'm looking at each rider and they're riding their horses, and I hadn't even asked the Kitten yet".

Big Blue Kitten started odds-on favorite for the Joe Hirsch Turf Classic Invitational Stakes at Belmont Park on September 28, but in a closely contested finish he was beaten a nose into second by Little Mike. On his final appearance of the year, he finished eighth behind Magician in the Breeders' Cup Turf at Santa Anita Park on November 2.

=== 2014: six-year-old season ===
Big Blue Kitten missed the first half of the 2014 season, making his debut in the Listed Lure Stakes at Saratoga on 12 August. Starting the 1.7/1 favorite, he came from well off the pace to take the lead in the last 50 yards and won by three quarters of a length from Bio Pro. Brown was delighted with the performance, saying, "What a great horse. I wasn't quite sure if I had him fit enough off the layoff. I told Joe if he won, it'd be terrific, but as long as he finished well we had some big plans for this horse later in the year. Lo' and behold, he got through anyway on heart".

Later that month, he finished second at Monmouth and in September he finished fourth to Main Sequence in the Joe Hirsch Turf Classic. In October, he was sent to Toronto for the Canadian International Stakes in which he finished second to the British colt Hillstar. On his final start of the year, he started favorite for the Red Smith Handicap in November but was beaten into second place by Dynamic Sky.

=== 2015: seven-year-old season ===
Big Blue Kitten began his fifth season in the Grade III Fort Marcy Handicap at Belmont on May 2. Ridden as usual by Bravo, he started favorite in an eight-runner field and won by two and a quarter lengths from Howe Great with Travers Stakes winner V E Day in sixth. Bravo explained his tactics by saying, "If you just point him at horses, he'll run them down. And ever since the first time I rode, that's all I've done—point him at horses." In the Grade I Manhattan Handicap at the same track in June, he struggled to obtain a clear run in the straight before finishing second, two and three quarter lengths behind his stable companion Slumber. Big Blue Kitten and Slumber met again in the United Nations Stakes on Monmouth on July 5, where the other contenders included Main Sequence, Twilight Eclipse, and San Luis Rey Handicap winner Ashleyluvssugar. After being restrained by Bravo as usual, he produced a strong late run to take the lead a furlong out and won the race for the second time, beating Slumber by a length and a half. Joe Bravo described the winner as "just like an old glass of wine, he keeps getting better with age".

In August, Big Blue Kitten was sent to Chicago to contest the Arlington Million and started 3/1 joint favorite alongside Slumber and Stars and Stripes Stakes winner The Pizza Man. He was held up for his customary late charge but failed by a neck to catch The Pizza Man. On September 26, Big Blue Kitten made his third attempt to win the Joe Hirsch Turf Classic Stakes at Belmont. He started second favorite behind the Bowling Green Handicap winner Red Rifle in a field which also included Slumber and Twilight Eclipse. He was held up as usual before overtaking pace-setter Shining Copper in the last quarter mile. He opened up a clear advantage and held off the late challenge of Slumber to win by three quarters of a length. The winning time of 2:23.9 was a turf track record and the fastest mile and a half ever run at Belmont, beating Secretariat's 2:24.0 on dirt in the 1973 Belmont Stakes.

Big Blue Kitten ended his season in the Breeders' Cup Turf at Keeneland on October 31. He proved the best of the North American horses as he finished a close third to the European challengers Found and Golden Horn.

In the Eclipse Awards for 2015, Big Blue Kitten was named American Champion Male Turf Horse, taking 134 of the 261 votes to win from Golden Horn and The Pizza Man.

=== 2016: eight-year-old season ===
Big Blue Kitten went winless in three starts as an eight-year/old. He began his sixth year of racing in the Woodford Reserve Turf Classic, finishing fifth behind Tourist (who went on to win the Breeders' Cup Turf Mile), Slumber, World Approval, and winner Divisidero. He then ran in the Manhattan Stakes, finishing sixth. After running last in the Northern Dancer Turf Stakes, he was retired to Calumet Farm. His 2017 stud fee was set at $15,000.

== Retirement ==
In 2025, Big Blue Kitten was retired to Old Friends in Georgetown, Kentucky.

== Pedigree ==
Pedigree of Big Blue Kitten (USA), bay horse, 2008
Sire Kitten's Joy (USA) 2001	El Prado (IRE); 1989	Sadler's Wells	Northern Dancer
Sire Kitten's Joy (USA) 2001	El Prado (IRE); 1989	Sadler's Wells	Fairy Bridge
Sire Kitten's Joy (USA) 2001	El Prado (IRE); 1989	Lady Capulet	Sir Ivor
Sire Kitten's Joy (USA) 2001	El Prado (IRE); 1989	Lady Capulet	Cap and Bells
Sire Kitten's Joy (USA) 2001	Kitten's First (USA); 1991	Lear Fan	Roberto
Sire Kitten's Joy (USA) 2001	Kitten's First (USA); 1991	Lear Fan	Wac
Sire Kitten's Joy (USA) 2001	Kitten's First (USA); 1991	That's My Hon	L'Enjoleur
Sire Kitten's Joy (USA) 2001	Kitten's First (USA); 1991	That's My Hon	One Lane
Dam Spent Gold (USA) 1997	Unaccounted For (USA); 1991	Private Account	Damascus
Dam Spent Gold (USA) 1997	Unaccounted For (USA); 1991	Private Account	Numbered Account
Dam Spent Gold (USA) 1997	Unaccounted For (USA); 1991	Mrs Jenney	The Minstrel
Dam Spent Gold (USA) 1997	Unaccounted For (USA); 1991	Mrs Jenney	Mrs Penny
Dam Spent Gold (USA) 1997	Spend A Dream (USA); 1987	Spend A Buck	Buckaroo
Dam Spent Gold (USA) 1997	Spend A Dream (USA); 1987	Spend A Buck	Belle de Jour
Dam Spent Gold (USA) 1997	Spend A Dream (USA); 1987	Mystical Mood	Roberto
Dam Spent Gold (USA) 1997	Spend A Dream (USA); 1987	Mystical Mood	Mystery Mood (Family: A1)

- Big Blue Kitten is inbred 4 × 4 to Roberto, meaning that this stallion appears twice in the fourth generation of his pedigree.
