= Kitten's Joy Stakes =

- Class: Listed
- Location: Gulfstream Park; Hallandale Beach, Florida, United States
- Inaugurated: 2012
- Race type: Thoroughbred – Flat racing – Turf
- Website: Gulfstream Park

Race information
- Distance: 1 1/16 miles
- Surface: Turf
- Track: Left-handed
- Qualification: Three-year-olds
- Weight: 124 lbs with allowances
- Purse: US$175,000 (2026)

The Kitten's Joy Stakes is a Listed American Thoroughbred horse race for horses three years old at the distance of one and one-sixteenths mile on the turf held annually in late January or early February at Gulfstream Park, Hallandale Beach, Florida. The event currently carries a purse of $175,000.

== History ==
The race was inaugurated in 2012 over the distance of 1 1/16 miles after Kitten's Joy who was a multiple graded stakes winner and the 2004 American Champion Turf Horse. Kitten's Joy also won the Grade III Palm Beach Stakes at Gulfstream Park where this race is held.

The event was shortened in one mile in 2015 and once again in 2018 to the current distance of about 7 1/2 furlongs.

In 2020 the event was upgraded to a Grade III.

In 2021 the distance of the event was increased to 1 mile.

The 2013 winner Charming Kitten and the 2017 winner Kitten's Cat were both sired by Kitten's Joy. Also both winners were owned Kenneth L. and Sarah K. Ramsey who also owned Kitten's Joy.

In 2022 the distance of the event was increased again to 1 1/16 miles.

In 2025 the event was downgraded by the Thoroughbred Owners and Breeders Association to Listed status.

== Records ==
Speed record:

- 1 1/16 miles: 1:39.78 – First World War (2024)
- 1 mile: 1:35.18 – Chess's Dream (2021)
- about 7 1/2 furlongs: 1:28.25 – Island Commish (2020)

Margins:

- 2 1/2 lengths – Howe Great (2012)

Most wins by a jockey

- 3 – John R. Velazquez (2013, 2015, 2019)
- 3 – Tyler Gaffalione (2021, 2023, 2024)

Most wins by a trainer

- 3 – Todd A. Pletcher (2013, 2022, 2023)

Most wins by an owner

- 2 – Kenneth L. and Sarah K. Ramsey (2013, 2017)

== Winners ==
Year	Winner	Jockey	Trainer	Owner	Distance	Time	Purse	Grade	Ref
2026	Thousandsticks	Mario Gutierrez	Brian A. Lynch	Silverton Hill	1 1/16 miles	1:40.23	$155,000	Listed	
2025	Charlie's to Blame	Luis Saez	Peter Eurton	BG Stables, Roadrunner Racing, SAF Racing, West Coast Stables, Barbara Evenson & Jeffrey Lambert	1 1/16 miles	1:40.48	$150,000	Listed	
2024	First World War	Tyler Gaffalione	Brendan P. Walsh	Qatar Racing & Hunter Valley Farm	1 1/16 miles	1:39.78	$175,000	III	
2023	Major Dude	Irad Ortiz Jr.	Todd A. Pletcher	Spendthrift Farm	1 1/16 miles	1:40.22	$175,000	III	
2022	Grand Sonata	Tyler Gaffalione	Todd A. Pletcher	Whisper Hill Farm	abt. 1 1/16 miles	1:41.53	$100,000	III	
2021	Chess's Dream	Tyler Gaffalione	Michael J. Maker	Michael Dubb, Steven Bouchey, Bethlehem Stables & Chester A. Bishop	1 mile	1:35.18	$100,000	III	
2020	Island Commish	Paco Lopez	Saffie A. Joseph Jr.	Matthew Schera	abt. 7 1/2 furlongs	1:28.25	$100,000	III	
2019	Casa Creed	John R. Velazquez	William I. Mott	LRE Racing & JEH Racing Stable	abt. 7 1/2 furlongs	1:30.64	$100,000	Listed	
2018	Flameaway	Julien R. Leparoux	Mark E. Casse	John C. Oxley	abt. 7 1/2 furlongs	1:29.78	$100,000	Listed	
2017	Kitten's Cat	Luis Saez	Joe Sharp	Kenneth L. and Sarah K. Ramsey	1 mile	1:36.41	$100,000	Listed	
2016	J R 's Holiday	Emisael Jaramillo	Jose Garoffalo	J.R. Racing	1 mile	1:35.20	$100,000	Listed	
2015	Dubai Sky	John R. Velazquez	William I. Mott	Three Chimneys Farm and Besilu Stable	1 mile	1:36.05	$100,000	Listed	
2014	Storming Inti	Alan Garcia	Chad C. Brown	Santa Rosa Racing Stables	1 1/16 miles	1:42.34	$100,000	Listed	
2013	Charming Kitten	John R. Velazquez	Todd A. Pletcher	Kenneth L. and Sarah K. Ramsey	1 1/16 miles	1:43.43	$100,000	Listed	
2012	Howe Great	Edgar S. Prado	H. Graham Motion	Team Valor International	1 1/16 miles	1:40.42	$100,000	Listed	

== See also ==
List of American and Canadian Graded races
