= Bobby's Kitten =

American-bred Thoroughbred racehorse

- Sire: Kitten's Joy
- Grandsire: El Prado
- Dam: Celestial Woods
- Damsire: Forestry
- Sex: colt
- Foaled: 2011
- Country: United States
- Colour: Dark Bay/Brown
- Breeder: Ken & Sarah Ramsey
- Owner: Ken & Sarah Ramsey
- Trainer: Chad C. Brown
- Record: 15: 6-1-3
- Earnings: $1,389,417

Major wins
- Pilgrim Stakes (2013); Penn Mile Stakes (2014); Breeders' Cup Turf Sprint (2014); Cork Sprint Stakes (2016)
- Last updated on June 4, 2018

Bobby's Kitten (foaled March 30, 2011 in Kentucky) is an American Thoroughbred racehorse who won the 2014 Breeders' Cup Turf Sprint. A dark bay or brown colt sired by Kitten's Joy, and homebred by his owners Kenneth and Sarah Ramsey, he is trained by Chad Brown. In 2013 he won his second race as a two-year-old before going on to win his first graded stakes race, the Grade III Pilgrim Stakes at Belmont Park. Both races were at 1 1/16 miles. He contested the Breeders' Cup Juvenile Turf that year and finished third. In his three-year-pld year, he won two minor races with uneven results in graded stakes competition until his come-from-last victory in the 2014 Breeders' Cup Turf Sprint at 6 1/2 furlongs.

== Pedigree ==
Pedigree of Bobby's Kitten (USA), bay, 2011
Sire Kitten's Joy (USA) 2001	El Prado (IRE); 1989	Sadler's Wells	Northern Dancer
Sire Kitten's Joy (USA) 2001	El Prado (IRE); 1989	Sadler's Wells	Fairy Bridge
Sire Kitten's Joy (USA) 2001	El Prado (IRE); 1989	Lady Capulet	Sir Ivor
Sire Kitten's Joy (USA) 2001	El Prado (IRE); 1989	Lady Capulet	Cap and Bells
Sire Kitten's Joy (USA) 2001	Kitten's First (USA); 1991	Lear Fan	Roberto
Sire Kitten's Joy (USA) 2001	Kitten's First (USA); 1991	Lear Fan	Wac
Sire Kitten's Joy (USA) 2001	Kitten's First (USA); 1991	That's My Hon	L'Enjoleur
Sire Kitten's Joy (USA) 2001	Kitten's First (USA); 1991	That's My Hon	One Lane
Dam Celestial Woods (USA) 2003	Forestry (USA); 1996	Storm Cat	Storm Bird
Dam Celestial Woods (USA) 2003	Forestry (USA); 1996	Storm Cat	Terlingua
Dam Celestial Woods (USA) 2003	Forestry (USA); 1996	Shared Interest	Pleasant Colony
Dam Celestial Woods (USA) 2003	Forestry (USA); 1996	Shared Interest	Surgery
Dam Celestial Woods (USA) 2003	Celestial Wish (USA); 1990	Relaunch	In Reality
Dam Celestial Woods (USA) 2003	Celestial Wish (USA); 1990	Relaunch	Foggy Note
Dam Celestial Woods (USA) 2003	Celestial Wish (USA); 1990	North of Eden	Northfields
Dam Celestial Woods (USA) 2003	Celestial Wish (USA); 1990	North of Eden	Tree of Knowledge (Family 3-h)
