= Alice Headley Chandler =

American horsebreeder and racing stable owner (1926–2021)

- Born: January 15, 1926; Lexington, Kentucky, United States
- Died: April 6, 2021 (aged 95); Lexington, Kentucky, United States
- Resting place: Lexington Cemetery
- Education: Ethel Walker School
- Occupation(s): Thoroughbred racehorse owner & breeder
- Known for: Mill Ridge Farm
- Spouse(s): 1) Reynolds Bell; 2) John A. Chandler
- Parent(s): Hal Price Headley & Genevieve Morgan Molloy
- Awards: United States Racing Hall of Fame (2020)

Alice Headley Chandler (January 15, 1926 — April 6, 2021) was an American Thoroughbred racehorse breeder and racing stable owner.

Chandler is known for establishing Mill Ridge Farm in Lexington, Kentucky. In 2020, the National Museum of Racing and Hall of Fame inducted Chandler under the Pillars of the Turf category for “extraordinary contributions to Thoroughbred racing in a leadership or pioneering capacity at the highest national level."

Chandler's motto was, “Take care of the horse, and it will take care of you.”

== Early life ==
Alice Molloy Headley was born January 15, 1926, in Lexington, Kentucky, to Hal Price Headley and Genevieve Morgan Molloy. Chandler's father owned Beaumont Farm, 4,000 acres of land in the western part of Fayette County, and was “one of the prime, and perhaps most important, of the original organizers of Keeneland,” an equine racing and sales facility in Lexington.

Chandler attended Warrenton Country Day in Virginia, the Ethel Walker School, and the University Training School in Lexington. She married Howard Current Judy in 1944 and had two children, Patricia and Michael. Chandler remarried in 1950 to Reynolds Wait Bell and moved to Texas, where Bell worked in the oil industry. Chandler had two sons while married to Bell, Headley and Reynolds.

Inspired by her father's legacy, Chandler returned to Lexington in 1959 to engage in horse breeding and sales.

In 1972, she married equine veterinarian Dr. John A. Chandler. Alongside Chandler, “they worked tirelessly to turn Mill Ridge into a leading destination for top sires and mares.”

== Mill Ridge Farm ==
In 1962, Hal Price Headley died and bequeathed to Chandler four mares and 286 acres of the Beaumont Farm, with which she founded Mill Ridge Farm.

In 1968, Chandler became the first American woman to breed an Epsom Derby winner who was sold at auction, Sir Ivor, a stallion descended from Alcibiades, a champion bred by Chandler's father in 1927. Sir Ivor was sold to Raymond Guest, an American businessman and U.S. Ambassador to Ireland, at Keeneland in 1966 for $42,000. After winning several major European races, Chandler's stallion influenced a shift in horse sales, emphasizing the U.S. commercial market and Keeneland, specifically.

Mill Ridge Farm has raised and sold several notable horses since its founding, to include 2001 Horse of the Year Point Given, 2011 Horse of the Year Havre de Grace, and 2005 Kentucky Derby winner Giacomo. Since 2000, Mill Ridge Farm has raised or sold seven Breeders’ Cup winners and 36 Grade 1 winners.

== Honors ==
Chandler's most prestigious honor is her induction into the National Museum of Racing and Hall of Fame in 2020 under the category of “Pillars of the Turf.” Her father was inducted only two years prior in 2018.

Chandler became a member of Keeneland's Button Club in 2012, an award that honors individuals/farms who have “played a prominent role in the growth of the Keeneland Association.”

In 2008, Chandler was given the Eclipse Award of Merit, one of the industry's highest honors, presented for “displaying outstanding lifetime achievement in, and service to, the Thoroughbred industry.”

In 2005, Chandler was the Honor Guest for the Thoroughbred Club of America's Annual Testimonial Dinner, an event that honors “outstanding figures of the turf world.”

== Death and legacy ==
Chandler died in her sleep at her home in Lexington, Kentucky on April 6, 2021. The Lexington-Herald Leader called Chandler a “pioneering horsewoman” and attributed Chandler as the conduit between the European horse industry and Keeneland.[7]

Chandler's legacy in the Thoroughbred industry endures through her children and grandchildren. Her son, Headley Bell, is the Managing Partner of Mill Ridge Farm. Bell's son, Price (named after his great-grandfather) is the General Manager. Mike Bell is a trainer, while Reynolds Bell is a bloodstock advisor and past president of the Thoroughbred Owners and Breeders Association.
