= Hampton Court Stakes =

Flat horse race in Great Britain

- Class: Group 3
- Location: Ascot Racecourse; Ascot, England
- Race type: Flat / Thoroughbred
- Website: Ascot

Race information
- Distance: 1m 1f 212y (2,004 metres)
- Surface: Turf
- Track: Right-handed
- Qualification: Three-year-olds excluding G1 / G2 winners
- Weight: 9 st 0 lb Allowances; 3 lb for fillies Penalties; 4 lb for Group 3 winners
- Purse: £150,000 (2025); 1st: £85,065

Hampton Court Stakes
2026
Generic	Endorsement	Glacius

Previous years
2025
Trinity College	Tornado Alert	Glittering Legend
2024
Jayarebe	King's Gambit	Bellum Justum
2023
Waipiro	Exoplanet	Bold Act
2022
Claymore	Reach For The Moon	Kingmax
2021
Mohaafeth	Roman Empire	Secret Protector

2020-2011
2020
Russian Emperor	First Receiver	Berlin Tango
2019
Sangarius	Fox Chairman	King Ottokar
2018
Hunting Horn	Crossed Baton	Zaaki
2017
Benbatl	Orderofthegarter	Mirage Dancer
2016
Hawkbill	Prize Money	Long Island Sound
2015
Time Test	Peacock	Mustadeem
2014
Cannock Chase	Mutakayyef	Postponed
2013
Remote	Shikarpour	Van Der Neer
2012
Energizer	Stipulate	Rewarded
2011
Pisco Sour	Alkimos	Slumber

2010-2001
2010
Afsare	Quadrille	Wigmore Hall
2009
Glass Harmonium	Cashelgar	Monitor Closely
2008
Collection	Staying On	King Of Rome
2007
Zaham	Al Shemali	Desert Dew
2006
Snoqualmie Boy	Petrovich	Hazeymm
2005
Indigo Cat	Belenus	Elliots World
2004
Moscow Ballet	Crocodile Dundee	Mutafanen
2003
Persian Majesty	Foodbroker Founder	Evolving Tactics
2002
Burning Sun	Izdiham	Common World
2001
Freefourinternet	Chianti	Down To The Woods

2000-1991
2000
Port Vila	Rasm	Chinatown
1999
Zarfoot	Flaming Quest	Helvetius
1998
Dark Moondancer	Mowbray	Kahtan
1997
Falak	Monza	Conon Falls
1996
Astor Place	Acharne	Masehaab
1995
Juyush	Warning Order	Stiffelio
1994
Rudagi	Run Softly	Ijlal
1993
White Muzzle	Right Win	Scottish Peak
1992
Profusion	Milzig	Lobilio
1991
Luchiroverte	Habaayib	Chandlery

1990-1988
1990
Middle Kingdom	Snurge	Lucky Guest
1989
Spritsail	Gran Alba	Relief Pitcher
1988
Mazzacano	Kalakate	Rasmara

The Hampton Court Stakes is a Group 3 flat horse race in Great Britain open to three-year-old horses. It is run at Ascot over a distance of 1 mile 1 furlongs and 212 yards (2,004 metres), and it is scheduled to take place each year in June.

== History ==
The race has been run under several different titles, and its status has been raised twice since the 1980s. For a period it was an ungraded event called the Churchill Stakes, and it was traditionally part of a Saturday fixture known as the Ascot Heath meeting. This took place on the day after the conclusion of Royal Ascot, which at that time was held over four days. The distance of the Churchill Stakes was 1 mile and 4 furlongs.

The car dealer Milcars began to sponsor the race in 1996, and it became known as the Milcars Conditions Stakes. The event was given Listed status in 1999, and from this point it was called the New Stakes (a former title of Royal Ascot's Norfolk Stakes). It was cut to 1 mile and 2 furlongs in 2000, and the sponsorship of Milcars continued until 2001.

The race was switched to day three of Royal Ascot in 2002, when the meeting was extended to five days to commemorate the Golden Jubilee of Queen Elizabeth II. That year's running was registered as the New Stakes, but for the Royal meeting it was renamed the Hampton Court Stakes. The extension of Royal Ascot was initially intended to be for one year only, but the extra day was retained thereafter. The race was now regularly titled the Hampton Court Stakes, named after Hampton Court, a royal residence of the Tudor period.

The event was promoted to Group 3 level and renamed the Tercentenary Stakes in 2011. Its new title was introduced to mark the 300th anniversary of Ascot Racecourse, which staged its first race meeting in 1711.

In 2017 the race reverted to its previous name, the Hampton Court Stakes.

== Records ==
Leading jockey (9 wins):

- Lester Piggott - Primera (1958), Lomond (1966), Laurentian Hills (1973), Arthurian (1974), Guillaume Tell (1975), Transworld (1977), Noble Quillo (1978), Lymphas (1982), The Miller (1984)

Leading trainer (6 wins):

- Sir Henry Cecil - Arthurian (1974), Lyphmas (1982), Skaramanga (1985), Russian Steppe (1987), Spritsail (1989), Burning Sun (2002)

== Winners ==
Year	Winner	Jockey	Trainer	Time
1950	Jai Mahal	Charlie Elliott	Harry Wragg	2:33.60
1951	Mossborough	Doug Smith	George Colling	2:35.00
1952	Le Sage	Gordon Richards	Jack Watts	2:31.80
1953	Le Vent	Jean Massard	François Mathet	2:37.00
1954	Prince Arthur	Charlie Smirke	Walter Nightingall	2:41.00
1955	Prefect	Scobie Breasley	Noel Cannon	2:36.00
1956	Le Pretendant	Doug Smith	Walter Nightingall	2:33.22
1957	Sway	Scobie Breasley	Staff Ingham	2:34.32
1958	Primera	Lester Piggott	Noel Murless	2:39.07
1959	Amourrou	Peter Robinson	Towser Gosden	2:40.12
1960	Sunny Court	Harry Carr	John M Rogers	2:35.04
1961	Brocade Slipper	Joe Mercer	Jack Colling	2:36.20
1962	Darling Boy	Joe Mercer	Jack Colling	2:36.38
1963	London Gazette	Greville Starkey	Harry Thomson Jones	2:36.66
1964	Abandoned due to waterlogging
1965	Goupi	Geoff Lewis	Staff Ingham	2:40.31
1966	Lomond	Lester Piggott	Ryan Jarvis	2:37.38
1967	Wage War	George Moore	Ted Leader	2:45.24
1968	Richmond Fair	Brian Taylor	Jack Jarvis	2:36.37
1969	Swallow Tail	Tony Murray	Doug Smith	2:36.97
1970	No race (Note: The 1970 running was cancelled, as the Saturday card was replaced by the usual Gold Cup day programme, which had been postponed due to a General Election in the UK.)
1971	Abandoned due to waterlogging
1972	Casual Lass	Eric Eldin	Ryan Jarvis	2:37.38
1973	Laurentian Hills	Lester Piggott	Robert Armstrong	2:40.43
1974	Arthurian	Lester Piggott	Henry Cecil	2:32.69
1975	Guillaume Tell	Lester Piggott	Vincent O'Brien	2:33.86
1976	Coin Of Gold	Willie Carson	Clive Brittain	2:35.26
1977	Transworld	Lester Piggott	Vincent O'Brien	2:40.90
1978	Noble Quillo	Lester Piggott	Vincent O'Brien	2:34.71
1979	Billbroker	John Reid	Gavin Pritchard-Gordon	2:35.87
1980	Fingals Cave	Willie Carson	John Dunlop	2:33.27
1981	Six Mile Bottom	Pat Eddery	Harry Wragg	2:40.67
1982	Lyphmas	Lester Piggott	Henry Cecil	2:40.67
1983	Society Boy	Pat Eddery	Jeremy Tree	2:32.30
1984	The Miller	Lester Piggott	Vincent O'Brien	2:33.59
1985	Skaramanga	Steve Cauthen	Henry Cecil	2:40.27
1986	Sadeem	Greville Starkey	Guy Harwood	2:30.00
1987	Russian Steppe	Steve Cauthen	Henry Cecil	2:41.84
1988	Mazzacano	Greville Starkey	Guy Harwood	2:31.02
1989	Spritsail	Steve Cauthen	Henry Cecil	2:31.32
1990	Middle Kingdom	Steve Cauthen	Barry Hills	2:36.00
1991	Luchiroverte	Michael Roberts	Clive Brittain	2:32.52
1992	Profusion	Alan Munro	Paul Cole	2:32.62
1993	White Muzzle	John Reid	Peter Chapple-Hyam	2:41.38
1994	Rudagi	Michael Roberts	Clive Brittain	2:31.15
1995	Juyush	Willie Carson	Barry Hills	2:32.76
1996	Astor Place	John Reid	Peter Chapple-Hyam	2:33.18
1997	Falak	Richard Hills	Dick Hern	2:39.51
1998	Dark Moondancer	Michael Kinane	Peter Chapple-Hyam	2:35.24
1999	Zarfoot	Frankie Dettori	Luca Cumani	2:32.56
2000	Port Vila	Richard Hills	John Gosden	2:07.27
2001	Freefourinternet	Pat Eddery	Brian Meehan	2:06.05
2002	Burning Sun	Richard Quinn	Henry Cecil	2:06.85
2003	Persian Majesty	Johnny Murtagh	Peter Harris	2:06.45
2004	Moscow Ballet	Jamie Spencer	Aidan O'Brien	2:07.98
2005 (Note: The 2005 running took place at York.)	Indigo Cat	Kieren Fallon	Aidan O'Brien	2:08.53
2006	Snoqualmie Boy	John Egan	David Elsworth	2:06.73
2007	Zaham	Richard Hills	Mark Johnston	2:06.27
2008	Collection (Note: The 2008 winner Collection was later exported to Hong Kong)	Kerrin McEvoy	William Haggas	2:07.55
2009	Glass Harmonium	Ryan Moore	Sir Michael Stoute	2:04.52
2010	Afsare	Kieren Fallon	Luca Cumani	2:06.22
2011	Pisco Sour	Jimmy Fortune	Hughie Morrison	2:11.84
2012	Energizer	Adrie de Vries	Jens Hirschberger	2:10.03
2013	Remote	William Buick	John Gosden	2:04.46
2014	Cannock Chase	Ryan Moore	Sir Michael Stoute	2:05.31
2015	Time Test	Frankie Dettori	Roger Charlton	2:03.05
2016	Hawkbill	William Buick	Charlie Appleby	2:09.59
2017	Benbatl	Oisin Murphy	Saeed bin Suroor	2:05.40
2018	Hunting Horn	Ryan Moore	Aidan O'Brien	2:03.02
2019	Sangarius	Frankie Dettori	Sir Michael Stoute	2:08.36
2020	Russian Emperor (Note: The 2020 winner Russian Emperor was later exported to Hong Kong)	Ryan Moore	Aidan O'Brien	2:05.86
2021	Mohaafeth	Jim Crowley	William Haggas	2:05.72
2022	Claymore	Adam Kirby	Jane Chapple-Hyam	2:07.45
2023	Waipiro (Note: The 2023 winner Waipiro was later exported to Hong Kong)	Tom Marquand	Ed Walker	2:05.10
2024	Jayarebe	Sean Levey	Brian Meehan	2:04.32
2025	Trinity College (Note: The 2025 winner Trinity College was later exported to Australia)	Ryan Moore	Aidan O'Brien	2:04.30
2026	Generic (Note: The 2026 winner Generic was later exported to Hong Kong)	James Doyle	Andrew Balding	2:04.94

== See also ==
- Horse racing in Great Britain
- List of British flat horse races
