= Colonel Liam Stakes =

American Thoroughbred horse race

- Class: Listed
- Location: Gulfstream Park; Hallandale Beach, Florida, United States
- Inaugurated: 1987 (as Palm Beach Handicap)
- Race type: Thoroughbred – Flat racing
- Website: www.gulfstreampark.com

Race information
- Distance: 1 mile
- Surface: Turf
- Track: Left-handed
- Qualification: Three-Year-Olds
- Weight: 124 lbs. with allowances
- Purse: US$200,000 (since 2023)

The Colonel Liam Stakes is a Listed American Thoroughbred horse race run annually in late February or early March on the turf course at Gulfstream Park in Hallandale Beach, Florida, over a distance of 1 1/16 miles. A listed event open to three-year-old horses and currently offers a purse of $200,000.

== History ==
The inaugural running in 1987 was run as the Palm Beach Handicap for horses age three and older. Since then it has been run on an allowance weight basis.

Kitten's Joy, who won the race in 2004, went on to be named that year's Champion Turf Horse after winning the Joe Hirsch Turf Classic and Secretariat Stakes and finishing second in the Breeders' Cup Turf. 2010 winner Paddy O'Prado finished third in the Kentucky Derby, first in the Secretariat, and sixth in the Breeders' Cup Classic in his three-year-old season. 1993 winner Kissin Kris went on to finish seventh in the that' year's Kentucky Derby, second in the Belmont Stakes, first in the Haskell Invitational Stakes, and third in the Breeders' Cup Classic in his three-year-old season.

Jockey Chris Antley's February 9, 1991 win aboard Magic Interlude was one of his five wins that day.

The race was run in two divisions in 1989. It was switched to dirt in 1990, 1993 and 1995.

The Palm Springs has been run at several distances:

- 7 furlongs – 1990
- 1 mile – 1987–1989
- 1 1/16 miles – 1991–1994, 2015 to present
- 1 1/8 miles – 1995–2014

The event was downgraded to Listed status in 2021.

In 2023 the event was renamed as the Colonel Liam Stakes after Colonel Liam who won the Pegasus World Cup Turf Invitational twice.

== Records ==
Speed record: (at current distance of 1-1/16 miles)

- 1:40.38 – Ticonderoga (2017)

Most wins by a jockey:

- 3 – Jerry Bailey (2002, 2003, 2004)
- 3 – Javier Castellano (2008, 2009, 2016)
- 3 – John Velazquez (2012, 2014, 2018)

Most wins by a trainer:

- 3 – William I. Mott (1984, 1985, 1998, 2014)
- 3 – Dale L. Romans (2004, 2007, 2010)

Most wins by an owner:

- 2 – Kenneth and Sarah Ramsey (2003, 2004)
- 2 – Peter Vegso (2002, 2006)

== Winners ==
Year	Winner	Age	Jockey	Trainer	Owner	Distance	Time	Purse	Grade
Colonel Liam Stakes
2023	Dude N Colorado (GB)	3	Irad Ortiz Jr.	Todd Pletcher	Three Diamonds Farm	1 mile	1:35.05	$200,000	Listed
Palm Beach Stakes
2022	Coinage	3		Mark E. Casse		abt. 1 mile	1:36.12		Listed
2021	Annex	3		William I. Mott		11/16 M	1:40.62		Listed
2020	Vitalogy (GB)	3	Javier Castellano	Brendan Walsh	Qatar Racing, M. Detampel & Bottle Rocket Stable	11/16 M	1:41.86	$150,000	III
2019	A Thread of Blue	3	Luis Saez	Kiaran P. McLaughlin	Leonard Green	11/16 M	1:41.93	$150,000	III
2018	Maraud	3	John Velazquez	Todd Pletcher	Treadway Racing Stable	11/16 M	1:41.01	$100,000	III
2017	Ticonderoga	3	Joel Rosario	Chad C. Brown	Woodford Racing, LLC	11/16 M	1:40.38	$100,000	III
2016	Converge	3	Javier Castellano	Chad C. Brown	Paul P. Pompa Jr.	11/16 M	1:40.64	$150,000	III
2015	Eh Cumpari	3	Jose C. Caraballo	Michael Dilger	Anstu Stables	11/16 M	1:40.96	$150,000	III
2014	Gala Award	3	John Velazquez	Todd Pletcher	M. Tabor/Derrick Smith/Susan Magnier	11/8 M	1:46.19	$150,000	III
2013	Rydilluc	3	Edgar Prado	Gary C. Contessa	Green/Dellatore-Bobo/et al.	11/8 M	1:48.18	$150,000	III
2012	Howe Great	3	John Velazquez	Graham Motion	Team Valor International	11/8 M	1:46.56	$150,000	III
2011	Joes Blazing Aaron	3	Orlando Bocachica	Allan hunter Jr.	Joseph Witek	11/8 M	1:47.85	$150,000	III
2010	Paddy O'Prado	3	Jesus Castanon	Dale L. Romans	Winchell Thoroughbreds	11/8 M	1:45.40	$150,000	III
2009	El Crespo	3	Javier Castellano	George R. Arnold II	G. Watts Humphrey Jr.	11/8 M	1:47.71	$150,000	III
2008	Sporting Art	3	Javier Castellano	Christophe Clement	Jon & Sarah Kelly	11/8 M	1:45.98	$150,000	III
2007	Duveen	3	Mark Guidry	Dale L. Romans	Andrew Farm	11/8 M	1:47.48	$150,000	III
2006	Go Between	3	Edgar Prado	William I. Mott	Peter Vegso	11/8 M	1:45.80	$100,000	III
2005	Interpatation	3	Thomas G. Turner	Robert Barbara	Elliot Mavorah	11/8 M	1:47.12	$100,000	III
2004	Kitten's Joy	3	Jerry Bailey	Dale L. Romans	Kenneth and Sarah Ramsey	11/8 M	1:48.76	$100,000	III
2003	Nothing To Lose	3	Jerry Bailey	D. Wayne Lukas	Kenneth and Sarah Ramsey	11/8 M	1:48.28	$100,000	III
2002	Orchard Park	3	Jerry Bailey	William I. Mott	Peter Vegso	11/8 M	1:49.80	$100,000	III
2001	Proud Man	3	René Douglas	Harry Benson	Robert Kaufman et al.	11/8 M	1:48.32	$100,000	III
2000	Mr. Livingston	3	Shane Sellers	William A. Kaplan	David & Teresa Palmer	11/8 M	1:48.04	$75,000	III
1999	Swamp	3	Richard Migliore	John C. Kimmel	Heiligbrodt Racing Stable	11/8 M	1:48.38	$75,000	III
1998	Cryptic Rascal	3	Mike E. Smith	William M. Badgett Jr.	Landon Knight	about 11/8 M	1:55.0	$75,000	III
1997	Unite's Big Red	3	Ruben Hernandez	Randy Mills	Joan Williams	11/8 M	1:47.2	$75,000	III
1996	Harrowman	3	Mike E. Smith	Robert Reid Jr.	Gulyas Stable	11/8 M	1:49.2	$75,000	III
1995	Admiralty	3	Julie Krone	William I. Mott	Allen E. Paulson	11/8 M	1:51.0	$75,000	III
1994	Mr. Angel	3	Herb McCauley	Martin D. Wolfson	Marian Prince	11/16 M (±)	1:44.4	$50,000	III
1993	Kissin Kris	3	Dave Penna	David R. Bell	John Franks	11/16 M	1:46.4	$50,000	III
1992	Preferences	3	Jorge Duarte	Martin D. Wolfson	Harbor View Farm	11/16 M	1:42.6	$50,000	III
1991	Magic Interlude	3	Chris Antley	Joseph H. Pierce Jr.	Pastime Stable (G. Watts Humphrey Jr. et al.)	11/16 M	1:43.0	$50,000	III
1990	Dawn Quixote	3	Craig Perret	Sonny Hine	Scott C. Savin	7 F	1:23.4	$50,000	III
1989-1	Shy Tom	3	Randy Romero	D. Wayne Lukas	Overbrook Farm	1 M	1:37.2	$40,000	
1989-2	Storm Predictions	3	Steve Gaffalione	Luis A. Olivares	Lisa Becker	1 M	1:36.2	$40,000	
1988	Tanzanid	3	Douglas Valiente	William J. Cesare	Three G Stable (B. Morton Gittlin family)	1 M	1:35.6	$50,000	
1987	Racing Star	5	Santiago Soto	Manuel A. Estevez	Five Star Stable	1 M	1:34.8	$50,000	
