= Creag-An-Sgor =

Irish-bred Thoroughbred racehorse

- Racing colours of Bill & Georgina Tulloch
- Sire: Captain James
- Grandsire: Captain's Gig
- Dam: Happy Thought
- Damsire: Kauai King
- Sex: Stallion
- Foaled: 25 March 1981
- Country: Ireland
- Colour: Bay
- Owner: Georgina Tulloch
- Trainer: Charlie Nelson
- Record: 9: 3-2-0

Major wins
- Middle Park Stakes (1983); Greenham Stakes (1984)

Awards
- Timeform rating 122 (1983), 114 (1984)

Creag-An-Sgor (25 March 1981 – 2003) was an Irish-bred, British-trained Thoroughbred racehorse and sire. He was one of the best British-trained colts of his generation in 1983 when he won two of his five races including the Group One Middle Park Stakes as well as taking second in the Richmond Stakes. He won the Greenham Stakes in the following spring but never won again although he took second place in the Sussex Stakes. He later stood as a breeding stallion in New Zealand and Australia.

== Background ==
Creag-An-Sgor was a bay horse with a narrow white blaze and a white coronet on his left hind foot. He was one of the best horses sired by Captain James, whose biggest win came in the 1978 edition of the Waterford Crystal Mile. Creag-An-Sgor's dam Happy Thought failed to win a race in eight attempts and was sold for £500 at the end of her racing career. Her dam Grenadiere was a high-class stayer who finished second in both the Lancashire Oaks and the Cesarewitch Handicap and was a half-sister to Full Dress. Grenadiere was in turn a granddaughter of the influential British broodmare Mitrailleuse whose other descendants have included One in a Million, Commanche Run and Milligram.

As a yearling, Creag-An-Sgor was put up for auction and bought for 20,000 Irish guineas by the bloodstock agent John Warren. He entered the ownership of Bill and Georgina Tulloch and was sent into training with Charlie Nelson at Kingsdown Stables at Upper Lambourn in Berkshire. The colt usually raced in a sheepskin noseband. Creag-An-Sgor is the name of a hill in Aberdeenshire and is a Scottish Gaelic phrase meaning Rock of the Cleft.

== Racing career ==
=== 1983: two-year-old season ===
Creag-An-Sgor began his racing career by finishing fourth in a six furlong maiden race at York Racecourse in June. Over the same course and distance in July he recorded his first success in a similar event, beating Bounty Hawk by a head despite veering to the left in the closing stages. He was then moved up in class for the Group Two Richmond Stakes at Goodwood Racecourse a race which proved to be one of the most controversial of the season. He finished second, beaten three quarters of a length by Vacarme with the front-running Godstone a length away in third. Following an objection by Godstone's jockey for "bumping and boring" the placings of the second and third-placed finishers was reversed, whilst a separate stewards inquiry led to the disqualification of Vacarme whose jockey, Lester Piggott was found guilty of "careles riding". The revised result saw Godstone declared the winner ahead of Creag-An-Sgor. In September, Creag-An-Sgor was moved up to seven furlongs for the Champagne Stakes over seven furlongs at Doncaster Racecourse and finished last of the four runners behind Lear Fan. It was subsequently revealed that the colt had sustained a minor leg injury in his previous race which had interrupted his training schedule.

On 29 September Creag-An-Sgor was moved up to Group One level for the Middle Park Stakes over six furlongs at Newmarket Racecourse and started the 50/1 outsider in a nine-runner field. Vacarme (the odds-on favourite) and Godstone were again in opposition whilst the other runners included Superlative (July Stakes, Flying Childers Stakes), Hegemony (runner-up in the Coventry Stakes), Executive Man (Premio Primi Passi) and Water Moccasin (Zukunfts-Rennen). Ridden by Steve Cauthen, Creag-An-Sgor took the lead soon after the start and set the pace from Superlative and Godstone before accelerating in the last quarter mile. He stayed on strongly in the closing stages and won by a length and a half and a short head from Superlative and Vacarme. He was the longest-priced winner in the history of the race which was first run in 1866.

=== 1984: three-year-old season ===
On his first appearance as a three-year-old Creag-An-Sgor contested the Greenham Stakes (a major trial race for the 2000 Guineas) over seven furlongs at Newbury Racecourse in April. Ridden by the veteran Joe Mercer he started at odds of 5/2 with his main opponent being Defecting Dancer, who had won the Windsor Castle Stakes and the Sirenia Stakes in 1983. After leading for most of the way he was overtaken by Defecting Dancer but rallied in the closing stages to regain the advantage and won by half a length. In an exceptionally strong renewal of the 2000 Guineas at Newmarket he was among the early leaders before fading to finish seventh of the nine runners behind El Gran Senor, Chief Singer, Lear Fan, Rainbow Quest, Keen and Bountiful.

After an absence of three months, Creag-An-Sgor returned to action in the Sussex Stakes at Goodwood in which he was matched against older horses for the first time. He finished third behind Chief Singer and Rousillon but was promoted to second after the racecourse stewards found Greville Starkey guilty of "reckless riding" on the runner-up. On his only subsequent start Creag-An-Sgor failed to reproduce his best form when finishing sixth in the Hungerford Stakes over seven furlongs at Newbury in August.

== Assessment ==
In the official International Classification for 1983 Creag-An-Sgor was rated the sixth-best two-year-old in Europe behind El Gran Senor, Rainbow Quest, Lear Fan, Long Mick and Siberian Express. The independent Timeform organisation gave him a rating of 122, nine pounds behind El Gran Senor, who was their top-rated juvenile. He was rated on 114 by Timeform in 1984.

== Stud record ==
At the end of his racing career, Creag-An-Sgor was exported to New Zealand to become a breeding stallion. He was sent to Australia in 2001, and died in 2003. The best of his offspring was the mare Let's Sgor, whose wins included the New Zealand Oaks and the Championship Stakes.

== Pedigree ==
Pedigree of Creag-An-Sgor (IRE), bay stallion, 1981
Sire Captain James (IRE) 1974	Captain's Gig (USA); 1965	Turn-To	Royal Charger
Sire Captain James (IRE) 1974	Captain's Gig (USA); 1965	Turn-To	Source Sucree
Sire Captain James (IRE) 1974	Captain's Gig (USA); 1965	Make Sail	Ambiorix
Sire Captain James (IRE) 1974	Captain's Gig (USA); 1965	Make Sail	Anchors Aweigh
Sire Captain James (IRE) 1974	Aliceva (IRE); 1966	Alcide	Alycidon
Sire Captain James (IRE) 1974	Aliceva (IRE); 1966	Alcide	Chenille
Sire Captain James (IRE) 1974	Aliceva (IRE); 1966	Feevagh	Solar Slipper
Sire Captain James (IRE) 1974	Aliceva (IRE); 1966	Feevagh	Astrid Wood
Dam Happy Thought (FR) 1973	Kauai King (USA); 1963	Native Dancer	Polynesian
Dam Happy Thought (FR) 1973	Kauai King (USA); 1963	Native Dancer	Geisha
Dam Happy Thought (FR) 1973	Kauai King (USA); 1963	Sweep In	Blenheim
Dam Happy Thought (FR) 1973	Kauai King (USA); 1963	Sweep In	Sweepesta
Dam Happy Thought (FR) 1973	Grenadiere (GB); 1967	Right Royal	Owen Tudor
Dam Happy Thought (FR) 1973	Grenadiere (GB); 1967	Right Royal	Bastia
Dam Happy Thought (FR) 1973	Grenadiere (GB); 1967	Fusil	Fidalgo
Dam Happy Thought (FR) 1973	Grenadiere (GB); 1967	Fusil	Mitraille (Family:16-h)
