= Christophe Clement Turf Stakes =

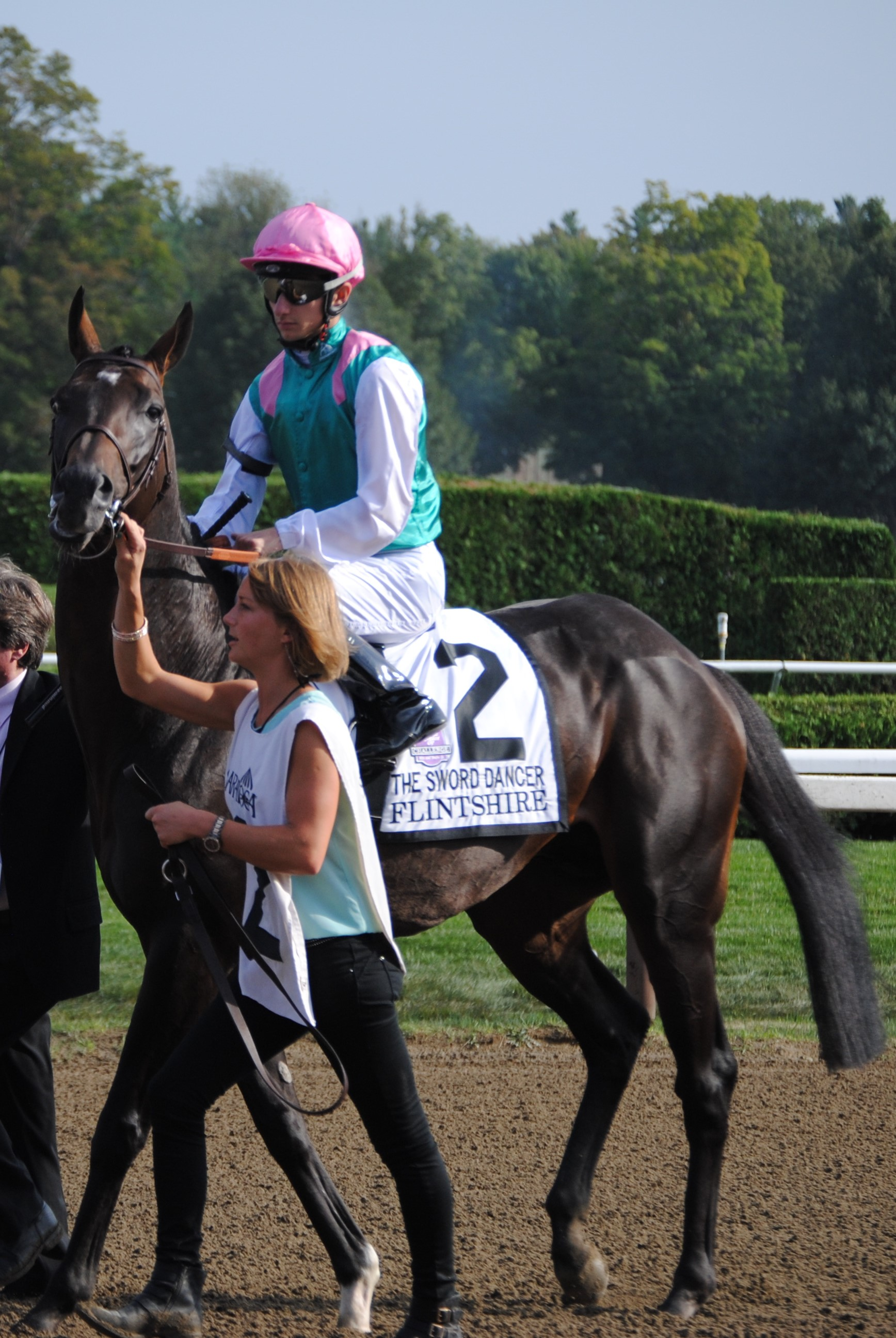
- Flintshire prior to winning the 2015 Sword Dancer
- Class: Grade 1
- Location: Saratoga Race Course; Saratoga Springs, New York, United States
- Inaugurated: 1975 (as the Sword Dancer Stakes)
- Race type: Thoroughbred – Flat racing
- Website: www.nyra.com

Race information
- Distance: 1 1/2 miles (12 furlongs)
- Surface: Turf
- Track: Left-handed
- Qualification: Three-year-olds & up
- Weight: Assigned
- Purse: US$750,000

The Christophe Clement Turf Stakes (formerly the Sword Dancer Stakes) is an American race for thoroughbred horses, aged three and up, run annually in mid August at Saratoga Race Course in Saratoga Springs, New York. A prep for the Breeders' Cup Turf, it is set at a distance of one and one-half miles (12 furlongs) on the turf. A Grade I event, the race currently offers a purse of $750,000.

Inaugurated in 1975 as a six furlong sprint on dirt for three-year-old horses, the race was originally named for 1959 Horse of the Year Sword Dancer, who was elected to the United States Racing Hall of Fame in 1977.

Beginning in 1977 the race was held at Belmont Park, then in 1992 it was moved to the Saratoga Race Course. Since its inception, the race has been contested at various distances:

- 6 furlongs : 1975–1976 (on dirt)
- 8.5 furlongs (1 1/16 miles) : 1977–1979
- 12 furlongs (1 1/2 miles) : 1980–present (on turf)

The race was run as an Invitational Handicap from 1994 to 2014.

In August 2025, it was announced on the day of the Sword Dancer Stakes that the race would be renamed in 2026 for the late thoroughbred trainer Christophe Clement, who died earlier that year. Clement won the Sword Dancer five times, more than any other trainer.

== Records ==
Speed record: (at current distance of 1 1/2 miles)

- 2:23.20 – Awad (1997)

Most wins:

- 2 – Majesty's Prince (1983, 1984)
- 2 – El Senor (1989, 1990)
- 2 – With Anticipation (2001, 2002)
- 2 – Grand Couturier (2007, 2008)
- 2 – Telling (2009, 2010)
- 2 – Flintshire (2015, 2016)
- 2 – Gufo (2021, 2022)

Most wins by an owner:

- 2 – John DeWitt Marsh (1983, 1984)
- 2 – Augustin Stable (2001, 2002)
- 2 – Marc Keller (2007, 2008)
- 2 – Alex & JoAnn Lieblong (2009, 2010)
- 2 – Juddmonte Farms (2015, 2016)
- 2 – Otter Bend Stables (2021, 2022)
- 2 - Michael B. Tabor (2023, 2026)

Most wins by a jockey:

- 4 – Pat Day (1987, 1997, 2001, 2002)

Most wins by a trainer:

- 5 – Christophe Clement (1999, 2011, 2021, 2022, 2024)

== Winners since 1975 ==
Year	Winner	Age	Jockey	Trainer	Owner	Distance (Miles)	Time	Grade
2026	Survie (IRE)	5	Manuel Franco	George Boughey	Michael Tabor	1-1/2	2:31.55	I
2025	El Cordobes (IRE)	4	Flavien Prat	Charlie Appleby	Godolphin Racing	1-1/2	2:25.04	I
2024	Far Bridge	4	Joel Rosario	Christophe Clement	LSU Stables	1-1/2	2:29.51	I
2023	Bolshoi Ballet (IRE)	5	John R. Velazquez	Aidan O'Brien	Westerberg, Mrs. John Magnier, Michael B. Tabor & Derrick Smith	1-1/2	2:29.29	I
2022	Gufo	5	Joel Rosario	Christophe Clement	Otter Bend Stables	1-1/2	2:28.92	I
2021	Gufo	4	Joel Rosario	Christophe Clement	Otter Bend Stables	1-1/2	2.28.30	I
2020	Channel Maker	6	Manuel Franco	William Mott	Wachtel Stable, Gary Barber Et Al	1-1/2	2:34.86	I
2019	Annals of Time	6	Javier Castellano	Chad C. Brown	Klaravich Stables, Inc. & William H. Lawrence	1-1/2	2:27.50	I
2018	Glorious Empire	7	Julien Leparoux	James L. Lawrence, II	Matthew Schera	1-1/2	2:24.41	I
2017	Sadler's Joy	4	Julien Leparoux	Thomas Albertrani	Woodslane Farm	1-1/2	2:24.58	I
2016	Flintshire (GB)	6	Javier Castellano	Chad C. Brown	Juddmonte Farms	1-1/2	2:23.45	I
2015	Flintshire (GB)	5	Vincent Cheminaud	André Fabre	Juddmonte Farms	1-1/2	2:23.77	I
2014	Main Sequence	5	Rajiv Maragh	H. Graham Motion	Flaxman Holdings	1-1/2	2:24.72	I
2013	Big Blue Kitten	5	Joe Bravo	Chad C. Brown	Kenneth and Sarah Ramsey	1-1/2	2:26.46	I
2012	Point of Entry	4	John Velazquez	Claude R. McGaughey III	Phipps Stable	1-1/2	2:26.40	I
2011	Winchester	6	Cornelio Velásquez	Christophe Clement	Mr. & Mrs. Bertram Firestone	1-1/2	2:26.74	I
2010	Telling	6	Garrett Gomez	Steve Hobby	Alex & JoAnn Lieblong	1-1/2	2:25.29	I
2009	Telling	5	Javier Castellano	Steve Hobby	Alex & JoAnn Lieblong	1-1/2	2:25.43	I
2008	Grand Couturier	5	Alan Garcia	Robert Ribaudo	Marc Keller	1-1/2	2:32.21	I
2007	Grand Couturier	4	Calvin Borel	Robert Ribaudo	Marc Keller	1-1/2	2:26.59	I
2006	Go Deputy	6	Eibar Coa	Todd Pletcher	Wertheimer et Frère	1-1/2	2:26.78	I
2005	King's Drama	5	Jorge Chavez	Robert J. Frankel	Gary A. Tanaka	1-1/2	2:27.38	I
2004	Better Talk Now	5	Ramon Domínguez	H. Graham Motion	Bushwood Stables	1-1/2	2:28.49	I
2003	Whitmore's Conn	5	Jean-Luc Samyn	Randy Schulhofer	Michael & Lynn Shanley	1-1/2	2:28.14	I
2002	With Anticipation	7	Pat Day	Jonathan Sheppard	Augustin Stable	1-1/2	2:24.06	I
2001	With Anticipation	6	Pat Day	Jonathan Sheppard	Augustin Stable	1-1/2	2:26.41	I
2000	John's Call	9	Jean-Luc Samyn	Thomas H. Voss	Trillium Stable	1-1/2	2:32.17	I
1999	Honor Glide	5	José A. Santos	Christophe Clement	Robert G. Schaedle	1-1/2	2:28.23	I
1998	Cetewayo	4	John Velazquez	Michael Dickinson	John A. Chandler	1-1/2	2:29.56	I
1997	Awad	7	Pat Day	David G. Donk	Ryehill Farm	1-1/2	2:23.20	I
1996	Broadway Flyer	5	Mike E. Smith	William I. Mott	Sultan & Bienstock	1-1/2	2:32.08	I
1995	Kiri's Clown	6	Mike Luzzi	Philip G. Johnson	Cobble View Stable	1-1/2	2:25.08	I
1994	Alex The Great	5	Pat Valenzuela	Rodney Rash	Vistas Stables	1-1/2	2:28.66	I
1993	Spectacular Tide	4	Julie Krone	Stanley M. Hough	Royal Lines Stable	1-1/2	2:30.39	I
1992	Fraise	4	Jerry Bailey	William I. Mott	Madeleine Paulson	1-1/2	2:25.88	I
1991	Dr. Root	4	Jean-Luc Samyn	Vincent L. Blengs	Barry K. Schwartz	1-1/2	2:25.43	I
1990	El Senor	6	Ángel Cordero Jr.	William W. Wright	William W. Wright	1-1/2	2:28.00	I
1989	El Senor	5	Herb McCauley	William W. Wright	Frances W. Luro	1-1/2	2:27.00	I
1988	Anka Germania	6	Craig Perret	Tom Skiffington	Fernwood Stable	1-1/2	2:32.20	I
1987	Theatrical	5	Pat Day	William I. Mott	Bertram R. Firestone	1-1/2	2:26.00	I
1986	Southern Sultan	5	Robbie Davis	Ross Pearce	Buckland Farm	1-1/2	2:39.60	I
1985	Tri For Size	4	Robert Thibeau Jr.	Michael Sedlacek	Rory Green Stable	1-1/2	2:33.20	I
1984	Majesty's Prince	5	Eddie Maple	Joseph B. Cantey	John DeWitt Marsh	1-1/2	2:31.00	I
1983	Majesty's Prince	4	Eddie Maple	Joseph B. Cantey	John DeWitt Marsh	1-1/2	2:34.40	II
1982	Lemhi Gold	4	Chris McCarron	Lazaro S. Barrera	Aaron U. Jones	1-1/2	2:26.00	II
1981	John Henry	6	Bill Shoemaker	Lefty Nickerson	Dotsam Stable	1-1/2	2:26.80	III
1980	Tiller	6	Ruben Hernandez	David A. Whiteley	William Haggin Perry	1-1/2	2:25.20	
1979	Darby Creek Road	4	Ángel Cordero Jr.	Howard M. Tesher	H. Joseph Allen	1-1/16	1:41.60	
1978	True Colors	4	Michael Venezia	Willard C. Freeman	Robert Billips	1-1/16	1:41.00	
1977	Effervescing	4	Ángel Cordero Jr.	John W. Russell	Ogden Phipps	1-1/16	1:39.60	
1976	Arabian Law	3	Jacinto Vásquez	David A. Whiteley	Lazy F Ranch	6 fur.	1:10.60	
1975	Gallant Bob	3	Gerard Gallitano	Joseph Marquette	Robert Horton	6 fur.	1:09.60	

- In 1987, Theatrical was awarded first place following the disqualification of Dance of Life.
