= Alcibiades (horse) =

American-bred Thoroughbred racehorse

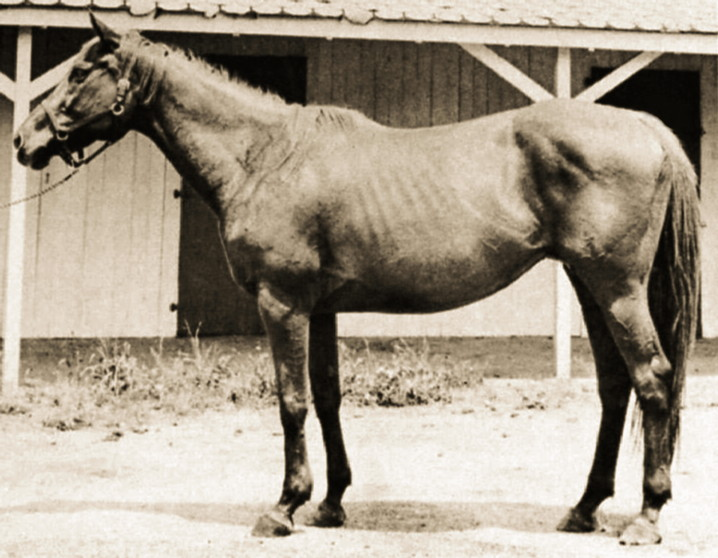
- Sire: Supremus
- Grandsire: Ultimus
- Dam: Regal Roman (GB)
- Damsire: Roi Herode (FR)
- Sex: Mare
- Foaled: 1927
- Country: United States
- Colour: Chestnut
- Breeder: Hal Price Headley
- Owner: Hal Price Headley
- Trainer: Walter Taylor
- Record: 23: 7–2–4
- Earnings: $47,860

Major wins
- Debutante Stakes (1929); Clipsetta Stakes (1929); Kentucky Oaks (1930); Arlington Oaks (1930)

Awards
- U.S. Champion 2-Yr-Old Filly (1929); U.S. Co-Champion 3-Yr-Old Filly (1930)

Honours
- Alcibiades Stakes at Keeneland Race Course
- Last updated on June 25, 2011

Alcibiades (1927–1957) was an American Thoroughbred racemare that won the Kentucky Oaks and was later a good broodmare.

== Background ==
Owned and bred by Hal Price Headley at his Beaumont Farm near Lexington, Kentucky, Alcibiades was named for the ancient Greek soldier and statesman Alcibiades. She was sired by Supremus out of Regal Roman. On her sire's side, she goes back to the great stallion Domino.

== Racing career ==
Alcibiades had seven starts with four wins at two-years. She won the Clipsetta Stakes and Debutante Stakes; ran second in the Kentucky Jockey Club Stakes, and was retrospectively named U.S. Champion two-year-old filly of 1929.

At the age of three years, she had 16 starts, for three wins. Alcibiades won the Grade I Kentucky Oaks, the Arlington Oaks and finished third in the Hawthorne Gold Cup, the Illinois and Latonia Oaks, and the Arlington Matron Handicap. She tore a tendon badly in the Latonia Championship, and this was the end of her racing career. She was retrospectively named Co-Champion three-year-old filly of 1930.

Alcibiades was retired from racing for a record of 23 starts with 7 wins, 2 seconds and 4 thirds with earnings of $47,860.

== Breeding record ==
As a broodmare, Alcibiades produced eight foals, seven of which were runners including:

- Lithe, a sister to Menow, won the Arlington Matron Stakes, the Demoiselle Stakes and Comely Stakes, etc.
- Menow was the American Champion Two-Year-Old Colt of 1937 and himself was an influential sire.
- Salaminia, winner of 5 races, including the Alabama Stakes; third dam of Epsom Derby winner Sir Ivor
- Sparta, had 12 wins and 13 seconds. Female-line ancestor of Cloud Computing.

== Pedigree ==
Pedigree of Alcibiades, chestnut mare, 1927
Sire Supremus	Ultimus	Commando	Domino
Sire Supremus	Ultimus	Commando	Emma C.
Sire Supremus	Ultimus	Running Stream	Domino
Sire Supremus	Ultimus	Running Stream	Dancing Water
Sire Supremus	Mandy Hamilton	John O'Gaunt	Isinglass
Sire Supremus	Mandy Hamilton	John O'Gaunt	La Fleche
Sire Supremus	Mandy Hamilton	My Sweetheart	Galeazzo
Sire Supremus	Mandy Hamilton	My Sweetheart	Lady Chancellor
Dam Regal Roman	Roi Herode	Lee Samaritain	Le Sancy
Dam Regal Roman	Roi Herode	Lee Samaritain	Clementina
Dam Regal Roman	Roi Herode	Roxelane	War Dance
Dam Regal Roman	Roi Herode	Roxelane	Rose of York
Dam Regal Roman	Lady Cicero	Cicero	Cyllene
Dam Regal Roman	Lady Cicero	Cicero	Gas
Dam Regal Roman	Lady Cicero	Ste Claire II	Isinglass
Dam Regal Roman	Lady Cicero	Ste Claire II	Santa Brigida (family: 8-g)
