= Lady Capulet (horse) =

American Thoroughbred racehorse

- Sire: Sir Ivor
- Grandsire: Sir Gaylord
- Dam: Cap and Bells
- Damsire: Tom Fool
- Sex: Mare
- Foaled: 3 April 1974
- Country: United States
- Colour: Grey
- Breeder: Claiborne Farm
- Owner: Robert Sangster
- Trainer: Vincent O'Brien
- Record: 3: 1-1-1

Major wins
- Irish 1000 Guineas (1977)

Awards
- Timeform rating 116 (1977)

Lady Capulet (foaled 3 April 1974) was an American-bred, Irish-trained Thoroughbred racehorse and broodmare. Her brief track career consisted of only three races in May and June 1977. She won the Irish 1000 Guineas on her debut before finishing second in the Coronation Stakes and third in the Pretty Polly Stakes. She was retired from racing to become a broodmare and made a major impact as the dam of the leading stallion El Prado.

== Background ==
Lady Capulet was a "lengthy, good-bodied, attractive" grey mare (originally described as "roan"), bred in Kentucky by Claiborne Farm. As a yearling she was offered for sale at Keeneland and was bought for $70,000 by representatives of the British owner Robert Sangster. She was sent to race in Europe where she was trained in Ireland by Vincent O'Brien at Ballydoyle.

Her sire, Sir Ivor was an American-bred colt who was trained in Europe and won The Derby and the Washington D C International in 1968 before standing as a breeding stallion in Kentucky. Sir Ivor's other major winners included Ivanjica, Cloonlara and Bates Motel. Lady Capulet's dam Cap and Bells was a successful racehorse and broodmare. Her other foals included Drone, an undefeated racehorse and successful breeding stallion, and Sir Wimborne, winner of the National Stakes and Royal Lodge Stakes. She was descended from the influential British broodmare Mistrella (foaled 1907) whose descendants have included The Oaks winners Beam and Light Brocade.

== Racing career ==
=== 1977: three-year-old season ===
A lack of physical maturity, coupled with the effects of a viral infection, meant that Lady Capulet did not race as a two-year-old. Poor ground conditions hampered her training in the spring of 1977 and it was not until 13 May that she made her first racecourse appearance in the Irish 1000 Guineas over one mile at the Curragh Racecourse. With the stable's first-choice jockey Lester Piggott opting to ride the Princess Elizabeth Stakes winner Lady Mere she was partnered by Tommy Murphy. The Athasi Stakes winner Orchestration started favourite ahead of Bold Fantasy, Lady Mere and Lady North with Lady Capulet starting a 16/1 outsider in a fourteen-runner field. After being restrained in the early stages Lady Capulet moved up on the outside a quarter of a mile from the finish to dispute the lead with Bold Fantasy and Nanticious before accelerating away from her rivals. She won by three lengths and a head from Bold Fantasy and Lay Mere with Nanticious (later to win the Ribblesdale Stakes) taking fourth place.

In June the filly was sent to England and was made odds-on favourite for the Coronation Stakes in which she was ridden by Piggott. On this occasion, however, her lack of experience seemed to tell as she was beaten a head into second by Orchestration. Piggott was again in the saddle later that month when Lady Capulet started odds-on favourite for the Pretty Polly Stakes over ten furlongs at the Curragh. She failed to reproduce her best form and finished third, five lengths behind the winner Claire's Slipper, appearing to be unsuited by the distance and the good-to-firm ground. She was later found to have been suffering from a "blood disorder".

== Assessment ==
In 1977, the independent Timeform organisation gave Lady Capulet a rating of 116, seventeen pounds behind their top three-year-old filly Dunfermline. In the Irish Free Handicap for three-year-olds, she was rated the second best filly, one pound behind Orchestration.

== Breeding record ==
Lady Capulet never raced again after her defeat in the Pretty Polly and was retired from racing at the end of 1977 to become a broodmare. She produced at least thirteen foals and four winner between 1980 and 1996:

- Donna Sabina, a chestnut filly, foaled in 1980, sired by Nonoalco. Unraced.
- All Ashore, grey filly, 1982, by Nureyev
- Sheristadar, grey filly, 1983, by Shergar
- Entitled, chestnut colt, 1984, by Mill Reef. Won Desmond Stakes, third in the Irish Derby.
- Zakarif, bay mare, 1988, by Lomond. Unraced.
- El Prado, grey colt, 1989, by Sadler's Wells. Won four races including the National Stakes. Later the Leading sire in North America, with his winners including Medaglia d'Oro and Kitten's Joy.
- Portrait Gallery, grey colt, 1990, by Sadler's Wells. Won three races, second in Blandford Stakes. Sire of National Hunt horses.
- Pia Tiara, bay filly, 1991, by Sadler's Wells. Won one race in Japan.
- Royal College, bay colt, 1992, by Sadler's Wells. Failed to win in three races.
- Antonia Bin, grey filly, 1993, by Sadler's Wells. Failed to win in two races.
- Asakusa Arondel, chestnut colt, 1994, by Caerleon. Failed to win in eight races.
- Lake Valentia, bay filly, 1995, by Fairy King. Unplaced on only start.
- Valnerina, grey filly, 1996, by Caerleon. Unraced.

== Pedigree ==
Pedigree of Lady Capulet (USA), grey mare, 1974
Sire Sir Ivor (USA) 1965	Sir Gaylord (USA); 1959	Turn-To	Royal Charger
Sire Sir Ivor (USA) 1965	Sir Gaylord (USA); 1959	Turn-To	Source Sucree
Sire Sir Ivor (USA) 1965	Sir Gaylord (USA); 1959	Somethingroyal	Princequillo
Sire Sir Ivor (USA) 1965	Sir Gaylord (USA); 1959	Somethingroyal	Imperatrice
Sire Sir Ivor (USA) 1965	Attica (USA); 1953	Mr. Trouble	Mahmoud
Sire Sir Ivor (USA) 1965	Attica (USA); 1953	Mr. Trouble	Motto
Sire Sir Ivor (USA) 1965	Attica (USA); 1953	Athenia	Pharamond
Sire Sir Ivor (USA) 1965	Attica (USA); 1953	Athenia	Salaminia
Dam Cap and Bells (USA) 1958	Tom Fool (USA); 1949	Menow	Pharamond
Dam Cap and Bells (USA) 1958	Tom Fool (USA); 1949	Menow	Alcibiades
Dam Cap and Bells (USA) 1958	Tom Fool (USA); 1949	Gaga	Bull Dog
Dam Cap and Bells (USA) 1958	Tom Fool (USA); 1949	Gaga	Alpoise
Dam Cap and Bells (USA) 1958	Ghazni (USA); 1942	Mahmoud	Blenheim
Dam Cap and Bells (USA) 1958	Ghazni (USA); 1942	Mahmoud	Mah Mahal
Dam Cap and Bells (USA) 1958	Ghazni (USA); 1942	Sun Miss	Sun Briar
Dam Cap and Bells (USA) 1958	Ghazni (USA); 1942	Sun Miss	Missinaibi (Family:1-l)

- Lady Capulet was inbred 3 × 4 to Mahmoud, meaning that this stallion appears in both the third and fourth generations of her pedigree.
