= El Prado (horse) =

Irish Thoroughbred racehorse

- Sire: Sadler's Wells
- Grandsire: Northern Dancer
- Dam: Lady Capulet
- Damsire: Sir Ivor
- Sex: Stallion
- Foaled: February 3, 1989
- Died: September 21, 2009 (aged 20)
- Country: Ireland
- Colour: Gray
- Breeder: Lyonstown Stud
- Owner: Robert Sangster
- Trainer: Vincent O'Brien
- Record: 9: 4-1-0
- Earnings: £141,245

Major wins
- Railway Stakes (1991); National Stakes (1991); Beresford Stakes (1991)

Awards
- Leading sire in North America (2002)

El Prado (February 3, 1989 – September 21, 2009) was a Thoroughbred racehorse and Champion sire. He was sired by Sadler's Wells, who was a fourteen-time Leading sire in Great Britain & Ireland. Out of the mare, Lady Capulet who won the Irish 1,000 Guineas on her racecourse debut, his damsire was Sir Ivor whose wins included the 1968 Epsom Derby, 2,000 Guineas Stakes, Champion Stakes and Washington, D.C. International Stakes.

Bred by Lyonstown Stud in Cashel, County Tipperary, El Prado was raced by leading British horseman, Robert Sangster, and trained by Vincent O'Brien. Racing at age two, he won four of his six starts including the National Stakes, Railway Stakes and the Beresford Stakes, all at The Curragh Racecourse and ridden by Lester Piggott. He was joint Irish champion 2 year-old. At age three, El Prado finished out of the money in all three starts.

== As a sire ==
Retired to stud duty, El Prado stood at Adena Springs in Midway, Kentucky. The Leading sire in North America in 2002, he sired eighty five stakes winners. Among them were:

- Nite Dreamer (b. 1995) - multiple stakes winner. Career earnings: $1,149,788
- Medaglia d'Oro (b. 1999) - Career earnings: $5,754,720. Leading North American and Australian sire. Sire of Rachel Alexandra and Songbird.
- Artie Schiller (b. 2001) - won Breeders' Cup Mile. Career earnings: $2,088,853.
- Borrego (b. 2001) - won Grades I Jockey Club Gold Cup, Pacific Classic Stakes. Career earnings: $2,052,090.
- Fort Prado (b. 2001 ) - 2004 Illinois-bred Champion Three Year Old, 2005 Illinois-bred Champion Older Handicap Male and Male Turf Horse. Career earnings: $1,097,002
- Kitten's Joy (b. 2001) - 2004 American Champion Male Turf Horse. Career earnings: $2,075,791. Leading Sire in the United States
- Asi Siempre (b. 2002) - racing mare whose wins included the Grade I Spinster Stakes. Career earnings: $953,300. Sold for broodmare duty for US$3 million to Sheikh Mohammed.
- Paddy O'Prado (b. 2007) - 3rd in the 2010 Kentucky Derby; sixth in the Preakness; winner of the Colonial Turf Cup and Virginia Derby.
- Winter Memories (2008) - 1st in the 2010 Miss Grillo Stakes; 2nd in Breeders' Cup Juvenile Fillies Turf; 1st in Appalachian Stakes, Sands Point Stakes and in Lake George Stakes.

At maturity, he reached 16 hands (64 inches, 163 cm) high.

== Pedigree ==
Pedigree of El Prado (IRE), gray stallion, 1989
Sire Sadler's Wells bay 1981	Northern Dancer bay 1961	Nearctic	Nearco
Sire Sadler's Wells bay 1981	Northern Dancer bay 1961	Nearctic	Lady Angela
Sire Sadler's Wells bay 1981	Northern Dancer bay 1961	Natalma	Native Dancer
Sire Sadler's Wells bay 1981	Northern Dancer bay 1961	Natalma	Almahmoud
Sire Sadler's Wells bay 1981	Fairy Bridge bay 1975	Bold Reason	Hail To Reason
Sire Sadler's Wells bay 1981	Fairy Bridge bay 1975	Bold Reason	Lalun
Sire Sadler's Wells bay 1981	Fairy Bridge bay 1975	Special	Forli
Sire Sadler's Wells bay 1981	Fairy Bridge bay 1975	Special	Thong
Dam Lady Capulet gray/roan 1974	Sir Ivor bay 1965	Sir Gaylord	Turn-to
Dam Lady Capulet gray/roan 1974	Sir Ivor bay 1965	Sir Gaylord	Somethingroyal
Dam Lady Capulet gray/roan 1974	Sir Ivor bay 1965	Attica	Mr. Trouble
Dam Lady Capulet gray/roan 1974	Sir Ivor bay 1965	Attica	Athenia
Dam Lady Capulet gray/roan 1974	Cap and Bells gray 1958	Tom Fool	Menow
Dam Lady Capulet gray/roan 1974	Cap and Bells gray 1958	Tom Fool	Gaga
Dam Lady Capulet gray/roan 1974	Cap and Bells gray 1958	Ghazni	Mahmoud
Dam Lady Capulet gray/roan 1974	Cap and Bells gray 1958	Ghazni	Sun Miss(Family 1-l)
