= Kenneth and Sarah Ramsey =

Horse breeders and owners

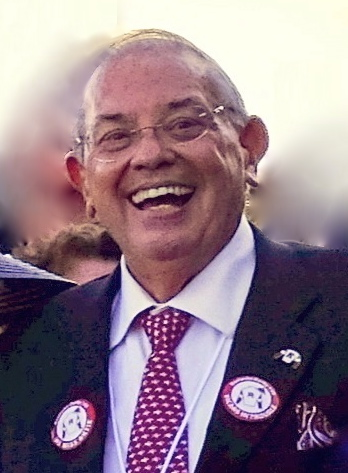
- Kenneth Ramsey in 2014

Personal information
- Occupation: Thoroughbred racehorse owners/breeders
- Website: Ramsey Farm

Horse racing career
- Sport: Horse racing
- Career wins: 1,976+ongoing As of 22 January 2017

Major racing wins
- Breeders' Cup wins: Breeders' Cup Turf Sprint (2014); Breeders' Cup Juvenile Fillies Turf (2011); Breeders' Cup Dirt Mile (2009); Breeders' Cup Filly & Mare Turf; Major Graded stakes race wins: Lecomte Stakes; 2014; 2015; Louisiana Derby; 2014; Knob Creek Manhattan Stakes; 2014; Flower Bowl Invitational Stakes; 2014; Arlington Million Stakes; 2013; Sword Dancer Invitational Stakes; 2013; Secretariat Stakes; 2004; 2013; United Nations Stakes; 2013; Just A Game Stakes; 2013; Queen Elizabeth II Challenge Cup Stakes; 2013; Breeders' Futurity Stakes; 2005; 2013; Darley Alcibiades Stakes; 2011; Colonial Cup Hurdle Stakes; 2010; Matriarch Stakes; 2007; John C. Mabee Handicap; Firecracker Breeders' Cup Handicap; 2005; 2007; Joe Hirsch Turf Classic Invitational Stakes; 2004; Whitney Handicap; 2004; Shadwell Turf Mile Stakes; 2004; Queen's Plate; 2016

Racing awards
- Eclipse Award for Outstanding Owner (2004, 2011, 2013, 2014); Eclipse Award for Outstanding Breeder (2013, 2014)

Significant horses
- Kitten's Joy; Catienus; Furthest Land; Real Solution; Precious Kitten; Stephanie's Kitten; Roses in May; Bobby's Kitten

Kenneth L. "Ken" Ramsey (born 1935) and Sarah Kathern "Kitten" Ramsey (February 5, 1939 – May 29, 2022) are horse breeders and owners of Thoroughbred race horses. They have multiple graded stakes winners, three Breeders' Cup winners, and the Ramseys themselves have won multiple Eclipse Awards for outstanding owner and breeder. Ken and Sarah own Ramsey Farm, a 1,200 acre horse breeding operation in Nicholasville, Kentucky, and have raced horses at tracks throughout the United States. Many of their race horses have names incorporating the word "Kitten", Ken's nickname for Sarah Ramsey, used as the inspiration for the name of their leading stallion, Kitten's Joy, a successful racehorse in longer races on turf racetracks. When his style of racing proved unfashionable and outside breeders were reluctant to send mares to him, the Ramseys bought a herd of their own mares to breed and raced the progeny themselves, with considerable success, punctuated by Ken Ramsey personally leading most of his horses into the winner's circle after their races. To further promote the stallion, most of his offspring have "Kitten" in their names and, in some cases such as Breeders' Cup winners Bobby's Kitten and Stephanie's Kitten, the Ramseys honor friends or family members by incorporating their names as well.

== Background ==
Both Ramseys are natives of Artemus, Kentucky, near Barbourville. Ken's father was a TVA mechanic. The family lived in a rural area and Ken's childhood home lacked indoor plumbing. Ken graduated from high school in 1952 as the valedictorian and began his college education on scholarship at Union College. He attended Eastern Kentucky University his sophomore year and then enlisted in the United States Navy. He graduated from the University of Kentucky, with help from the GI Bill. He went on to Officer Training School and was a commissioned officer in the Naval Reserve.

Sarah was the daughter of a coal miner. She is called by her middle name, Kathern, by friends and family, but is known generally as Sarah. She attended Union College, where she graduated in 1962. Her nickname "Kitten" was derived from her middle name and given to her by Ken when the couple was dating in 1954. They married in 1958 and have four children.

"Both of us gamble. Realtor, cellphone towers, stock market, horse players."

— Sarah Ramsey

Ken Ramsey began his business career as a truck driver in the northeast before returning to Kentucky and managing a trucking company. He became a realtor in the 1970s and 1980s. Sarah assisted Ken as a secretary and manager of their various enterprises. The Ramseys went on to generate much of their wealth through investment in radio and cellular phone businesses. They owned cellular telephone tower businesses in Georgia, North Carolina, Oregon, California and Kentucky, one of which they sold in 1994 for $39 million and used the proceeds to purchase the former Almahurst Farm in Nicholasville, Kentucky. Their original purchase included 377 acres of the original historic farm, but the seller kept the Almahurst name with him. They named the property Ramsey Farm in 1995, and purchased additional parcels of land over the years, bringing the total acreage to approximately 1,200 acres.

Sarah had a severe stroke in 2007, which resulted in her being in a coma for three weeks and developing paralysis on the right side of her body. She used a wheelchair and had difficulty speaking; she sometimes communicated via whiteboard. Fellow horse owner Marylou Whitney, who had also suffered a stroke, offered medical advice and emotional support to the Ramseys. To express their gratitude, the Ramseys named one of their fillies Thank You Marylou.

Their philanthropic interests include the Kenneth L. and Sarah K. Ramsey Center for Health and Natural Sciences building at Union College. They helped the college obtain the property, which was the former Knox County Hospital, and contributed the funds to help remodel it into a classroom building.

=== Kidney transplantation ===
On June 20, 2024, Kenneth, age 88, underwent a successful kidney transplantation at the Weill Cornell Transplant Center of NewYork-Presbyterian Hospital. The same day his grandson Nolan Ramsey saddled at Gulfstream Park "Clearly Copper' for a 4 1/2-length maiden-breaking victory. The second oldest kidney transplant record in the United States is 84.

== Horse breeding and racing ==
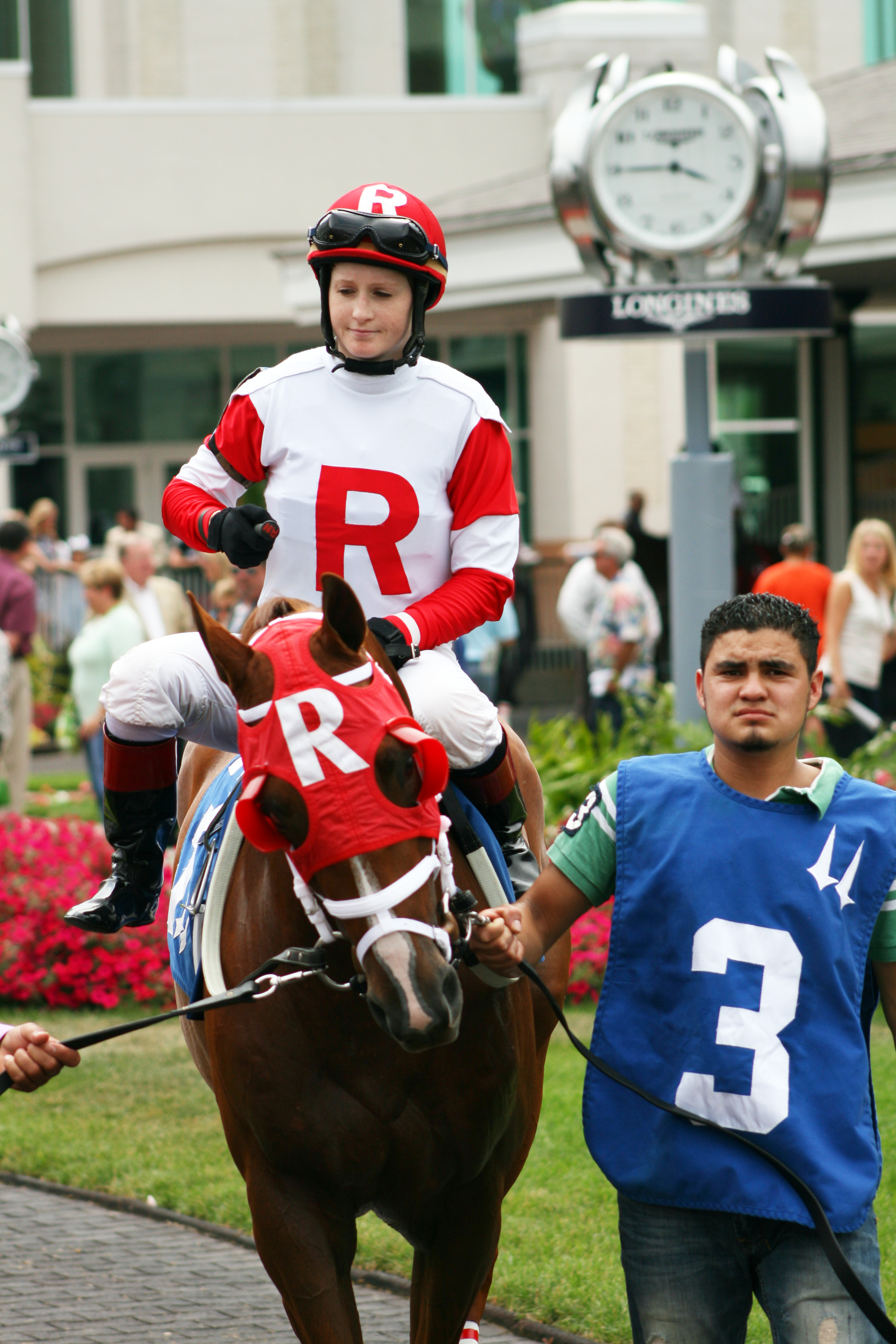
Rosie Napravnik on the Ramseys' Dehere On Tour, 2013

Ken's original interest in horse racing began when an aunt took him to Churchill Downs when he was 6 years old. As an adult, he began buying race horses from the claiming race ranks, but his first claimer never raced. As Ramsey explained, "The first horse I ever owned was Red Redeemer and it was about 1968 or '69—I've been around a long time. I claimed the horse for $1,500 at a now-defunct half-mile bull ring called Miles Park in west Louisville... [the horse] was totally blind in one eye so we ended up claiming a horse that had one eye and no testicles."

Ken held a trainer's license for a short period, and the Ramseys bred a few Thoroughbreds in the 1970s and 1980s. They became serious about horse breeding in 1994 when they purchased the former Almahurst Farm, which was the birthplace of 1918 Kentucky Derby winner Exterminator and the Standardbred racehorse Greyhound. They renamed the farm Ramsey Farm and as of 2015 stand the stallions Kitten's Joy, Catienus and Real Solution.

The Ramsey Farm focuses on breeding horses to race, not simply to sell or show. They allow their horses to live in a natural environment outside most of the time, which helps the horses be tougher on the track. They stay outside even in cold weather and are allowed to run over rolling, hilly terrain. The Ramsey fields are about 70 acres each and horses are grouped into herds of about 30. Ken Ramsey takes particular pride in the farm's water, which is taken from springs and creeks that are on farm property, and used for both human and horse consumption. However, the horses are also given luxury treatment when needed—the farm also has an equine spa that has an underwater treadmill with whirlpool jets. It can be heated, and when horses exit the spa, there is also a vibrating platform beneath heat lamps for further treatment. It was originally built for the care of Kitten's Joy, but is also used by other horses who have a need for its benefits.

The Ramseys work with many trainers, matching their horses to trainers that fit a horse's specialty. Kitten's Joy was trained by Dale Romans. Other horses have been trained by D. Wayne Lukas, Bobby Frankel, Chad Brown, and Mike Maker. In 2015, they sent 11 horses to the new training stable of Maker's former assistant, Joe Sharp.

By 2017, the Ramseys had 630 horses, with as many as 400 in race training, and produced about 100 foals a year. At the urging of their sons, they began to reduce the number of claiming horses they raced, and downsized their breeding size of their operation to focus their efforts on higher-end races, particularly using daughters of Kitten's Joy to produce horses that can run on dirt tracks and with Derby potential. A grandson said of Ken, "he wants it on his tombstone that he won the Kentucky Derby."

=== Horses ===
Their best known race horse and premier stallion at their farm is Kitten's Joy, who retired with a 14: 9-4-0 race record and earnings of $2,075,791. He won multiple graded stakes races on turf courses, was second in the 2004 Breeders' Cup Turf, and won the Eclipse Award for American Champion Male Turf Horse. They also had success with the dirt track horse Roses in May, winner of the Dubai World Cup, who they sold to stand at stud in Japan. After retiring Kitten's Joy, they found that the market was poor for offspring of turf horses who did well at distance races; buyers wanted horses that ran on dirt at a young age. So they began to carefully invest in relatively inexpensive mares, some obtained in claiming races, but with suitable pedigrees. They built up a herd of over 100 mares to breed to Kitten's Joy and then they raced the offspring themselves. To help promote the farm's program, Ken Ramsey made a point of leading his horses into the winner's circle after races. Prior to her stroke, Sarah Ramsey also led in winners, but only for the Grade I wins. After their formula proved successful and they had many homebred winners, the stud fee for people to breed outside mares to Kitten's Joy rose, reaching $100,000 for the 2014 breeding season. They also added their Kitten's Joy son Real Solution to their stallion roster in 2015, after that colt won races that included the Premio Botticelli in Italy, the Arlington Million and the Manhattan Stakes in the US, and retired with winnings over $1.3 million.

Racing colors of Ramsey Farms

The "Kitten" moniker given to most of the Ramsey's homebred horses originates with Sarah's nickname, "Kitten". Sarah's first Thoroughbred was named Kitten's First, and that mare produced Kitten's Joy as well as several other winners. Sarah named their stallion "Kitten's Joy" because "she sensed that the horse would bring them great happiness." On the advice of a former partner, Brereton Jones, the Ramseys continue to give "Kitten" names to the foals sired by Kitten's Joy to recognize the value of the stallion. The Ramseys also name their horses after family members, such as Dean's Kitten, who was named after Kenneth Ramsey's sister-in-law. The filly Stephanie's Kitten, winner of the 2015 Breeders' Cup Filly & Mare Turf, was named for the Ramsey's granddaughter. Other people are honored with Ramsey horses being named after them, such as their Breeders' Cup winner Bobby's Kitten, named in honor of race horse trainer Bobby Frankel, and Thank You Marylou, who ran third in the 2014 Kentucky Oaks, named for Marylou Whitney. Other "Kittens" in the Ramsey stable include Admiral Kitten, Kitten Kaboodle, Fear the Kitten, Big Blue Kitten, and Emotional Kitten. Their naming scheme also brought out humor from other race horse owners; Perry Martin, owner of California Chrome, named a filly Not a Kitten.

=== Awards and major races ===
The Ramseys have been North America's leading owners by earnings in 2013 and 2014. They have won four Eclipse Awards for outstanding owners and two for outstanding breeder, and won the 2006 Kentucky Thoroughbred Media award. The Ramseys have won leading owner titles at Saratoga, Gulfstream Park, Ellis Park, and Turfway Park. They hold the record at Churchill Downs for most leading owner titles in the history of the track, with 28 titles, and the record at Keeneland, with 18. The one major race victory to elude them is the Kentucky Derby, which they have yet to win. Their best finish to date in a Triple Crown race was a third-place finish in the 2005 Belmont Stakes with Nolan's Cat. Their Kentucky Derby contenders included Ten Cents A Shine (eighth in 2003), Dean's Kitten (14th in 2010), Derby Kitten (13th in 2011), Charming Kitten (ninth in 2013), We Miss Artie and Vicar's in Trouble (10th and 19th in 2014) and Oscar Nominated (17th in 2016). They were forced to scratch their 2015 contender, Louisiana Derby winner International Star.

=== Legal issues ===
In 2021 trainer Wesley A. Ward filed a lawsuit to recover nearly $1 million he claims to be owed in delinquent training bills. Ward acquired an agricultural lien against the horses because of the debt and received permission to sell them during a hearing before Jessamine County Court. Fourteen racing prospects, racing or stallion prospects, and racing or broodmare prospects to the Keeneland January (2022) Horses of All Ages Sale.
