= Lear Fan =

American-bred Thoroughbred racehorse

- Sire: Roberto
- Grandsire: Hail To Reason
- Dam: Wac
- Damsire: Lt. Stevens
- Sex: Stallion
- Foaled: 2 February 1981
- Country: United States
- Colour: Bay
- Breeder: Constantine Karpidas
- Owner: Ahmed Salman
- Trainer: Guy Harwood
- Record: 8: 5-0-1

Major wins
- Champagne Stakes (1983); Craven Stakes (1984); Prix Jacques Le Marois (1984)

Awards
- Timeform rating: 130 (1983), 127 (1984)

Lear Fan (2 February 1981 – 7 July 2008) was an American-bred, British-trained Thoroughbred racehorse and sire. One of an exceptionally strong generation of European racehorses he was one of the leading two-year-olds when he was unbeaten in three races including the Champagne Stakes. In the following year he defeated Rainbow Quest in the Craven Stakes before finishing third to El Gran Senor and Chief Singer in the 2000 Guineas. He recorded his most valuable success later that year when defeating Palace Music in the Prix Jacques Le Marois. At the end of his three-year-old season he was retired to stud in Kentucky where he proved to be a successful sire of winners. He was retired from stud duty in 2004 and died four years later.

== Background ==
Lear Fan was a big, powerfully-built bay horse with a faint white star, bred in Kentucky by Constantine Karpidas. He was sired by Roberto, an American-bred horse who won The Derby and the inaugural Benson and Hedges Gold Cup as a three-year-old in 1972. At stud, Roberto sired many important winners including Sunshine Forever, Real Shadai, At Talaq, Touching Wood, Kris S. and Dynaformer. Lear Fan's dam Wac was a full-sister to Bel Sheba, the dam of the Kentucky Derby winner Alysheba.

As a yearling, Lear Fan was sent to Europe and offered for sale at the Tattersalls Highflyer sale at Newmarket. He was bought for 64,000 guineas by the bloodstock agent James Delahooke acting on behalf of Ahmed Salman. The colt was sent into training with Guy Harwood at Pulborough. At the time, Harwood was noted for his modern approach to training, introducing Britain to features such as artificial gallops and barn-style stabling. The colt was named after the experimental LearAvia Lear Fan aircraft.

== Racing career ==
=== 1983: two-year-old season ===
Lear Fan made his first racecourse appearance in the Isleham Maiden Stakes over seven furlongs at Newmarket Racecourse in August. Ridden by Greville Starkey he started 2/1 favorite in a field of twenty runners. He produced a highly impressive performance, taking the lead approaching the final furlong and accelerating clear to win by eight lengths from Millside. The colt was scheduled to run next in the Solario Stakes, but his connections decided not to risk him on the firm ground. At the end the month, he returned to Newmarket for the Fitzroy House Stakes, the first one-mile race for two-year-old of the season in the United Kingdom. Ridden by Tony Clark (Starkey was required to ride at Goodwood), Lear Fan carried eleven pounds more than his rivals but started the 4/11 favorite in a field of six. He took the lead just after half way and quickly went clear of his opponents before being eased down by Clark in the closing stages. The official winning margin was eight lengths, but Timeform assessed his winning distance as at least eleven.

On 9 September, Lear Fan was moved up in class to contest the Group Two Champagne Stakes over seven furlongs at Doncaster Racecourse with Clark again in the saddle as Starkey was serving a suspension. Only three horses appeared to oppose him, following the late withdrawal of the Vintage Stakes winner Trojan Fen, and he started at odds of 1/4. Lear Fan gave some trouble at the start after being distracted by the appearance of a pony with a small dog on its back. In the race he took the lead at half way and went five lengths clear before being eased down to win by three and a half lengths from Kalim. The form of the race was boosted when Creag-An-Sgor, who finished last of the four runners, won the Group One Middle Park Stakes at Newmarket in October.

=== 1984: three-year-old season ===
Lear Fan was ridden by Starkey when he made his three-year-old debut in the Craven Stakes, a trial race for the 2000 Guineas, over the Rowley Mile course at Newmarket in April. He was required to carry five pounds more than Rainbow Quest, one of only two colts to have been rated ahead of him in 1983. Starkey sent Lear Fan into the lead from the start and set a strong pace until Rainbow Quest moved up to challenge him in the last quarter mile. The two colts drew clear of their opponents and raced alongside each other throughout the closing stages in what was described as a "tremendous duel" before Lear Fan prevailed by a head. Three weeks later, Lear Fan started second favorite at odds of 7/2 for the 2000 Guineas, with the Irish-trained El Gran Senor, the top-rated juvenile of 1983 being made the 15/8 favorite. Lear Fan again went into the lead from the start but was overtaken after six furlongs and finished third, beaten two and a half lengths and four lengths by El Gran Senor and Chief Singer. Rainbow Quest finished one place behind Lear Fan in fourth and it was suggested that both horses were still feeling the effects of their race in the Craven.

Lear Fan was off the racecourse for three months before returning in the Group One Prix Jacques Le Marois over 1600 metres at Deauville Racecourse in August. He started second favorite behind the French colt Siberian Express in a field which also included Palace Music, Masarika (Poule d'Essai des Pouliches) and Mendez (Prix Jean Prat). Lear Fan settled behind the pacemaker Ardash, before taking the lead 400 meters from the finish accelerating clear of the field and winning by four lengths from Palace Music. A month later, Lear Fan returned to France and started odds-on favorite for the Prix du Moulin at Longchamp Racecourse. Racing on much softer ground than at Deauville, Lear Fan took the lead in the straight and looked likely to win, but tired in the closing stages and was beaten half a length by Mendez.

On his final appearance, Lear Fan was sent to California to contest the inaugural running of the Breeders' Cup Mile at Hollywood Park Racetrack in November. The firm ground was expected to suit the colt, but he failed to cope with the tight oval track and lost all chance by running wide on the turns, finishing seventh behind Royal Heroine.

== Assessment ==
In the official International Classification for 1983, Lear Fan was rated the third-best two-year-old in Europe, behind El Gran Senor and Rainbow Quest, respectively first and second in the Dewhurst Stakes. The independent Timeform organization rated him on 130, equal with Rainbow Quest and a pound behind El Gran Senor. In the following season, Timeform rated him on 127, nine pounds below the top-rated El Gran Senor. In that year' International Classification, he was rated the fifth best three-year-old colt in Europe behind El Gran Senor, Chief Singer, Darshaan and Sadler's Wells and the eighth best horse of any age.

== Stud record ==
Lear Fan was retired from racing to become a breeding stallion at the Gainesway Farm near Lexington, Kentucky. Lear Fan remained at Gainesway throughout his stallion career, establishing himself as one of the United States' leading turf sires, before being pensioned in 2004. He sired the winners of at least 65 stakes races and $41m in prize money.

- Lear Spear (bay gelding, foaled 1985), won Prince of Wales's Stakes
- Sikeston (bay colt, foaled 1986), won Gran Criterium, Premio Parioli, Premio Ribot, Premio Vittorio di Capua, Premio Presidente della Repubblica, Queen Anne Stakes, Premio Roma, International Stakes
- Verveine (brown mare, foaled 1989), won Prix de l'Opéra
- Labeeb (bay colt, foaled 1992), won Hollywood Derby, Woodbine Mile
- Ryafan (bay mare, foaled 1994), European Champion Three-year-old filly and American Champion Female Turf Horse
- Sarafan (bay gelding, foaled 1997), won Eddie Read Handicap
- Arcalis (grey gelding, foaled 2000), won Supreme Novices' Hurdle, Fighting Fifth Hurdle
- Good Ba Ba (bay gelding, foaled 2000), won Chairman's Trophy, Hong Kong Mile, Hong Kong Stewards' Cup, Queen's Silver Jubilee Cup, Champions Mile

Among the horses bred from Lear Fan mares have been the Breeders' Cup Turf winner Johar, the European Champion Older Horse Azamour and the American Champion Male Turf Horse Kitten's Joy.

Lear Fan died at Gainesway of "natural causes" 7 July 2008.

== Pedigree ==
Pedigree of Lear Fan (USA), bay horse, 1981
Sire Roberto (USA) 1969	Hail To Reason (USA); 1958	Turn-To	Royal Charger
Sire Roberto (USA) 1969	Hail To Reason (USA); 1958	Turn-To	Source Sucree
Sire Roberto (USA) 1969	Hail To Reason (USA); 1958	Nothirdchance	Blue Swords
Sire Roberto (USA) 1969	Hail To Reason (USA); 1958	Nothirdchance	Galla Colors
Sire Roberto (USA) 1969	Bramalea (USA); 1959	Nashua	Nasrullah
Sire Roberto (USA) 1969	Bramalea (USA); 1959	Nashua	Segula
Sire Roberto (USA) 1969	Bramalea (USA); 1959	Rarelea	Bull Lea
Sire Roberto (USA) 1969	Bramalea (USA); 1959	Rarelea	Bleebok
Dam Wac (USA) 1969	Lt. Stevens (USA); 1961	Nantallah	Nasrullah
Dam Wac (USA) 1969	Lt. Stevens (USA); 1961	Nantallah	Shimmer
Dam Wac (USA) 1969	Lt. Stevens (USA); 1961	Rough Shod	Gold Bridge
Dam Wac (USA) 1969	Lt. Stevens (USA); 1961	Rough Shod	Dalmary
Dam Wac (USA) 1969	Belthazar (USA); 1960	War Admiral	Man o' War
Dam Wac (USA) 1969	Belthazar (USA); 1960	War Admiral	Brushup
Dam Wac (USA) 1969	Belthazar (USA); 1960	Blinking Owl	Pharamond
Dam Wac (USA) 1969	Belthazar (USA); 1960	Blinking Owl	Baba Kenny (Family 20)
