= Sir Ivor =

American-bred Thoroughbred racehorse and sire (1965–1995)

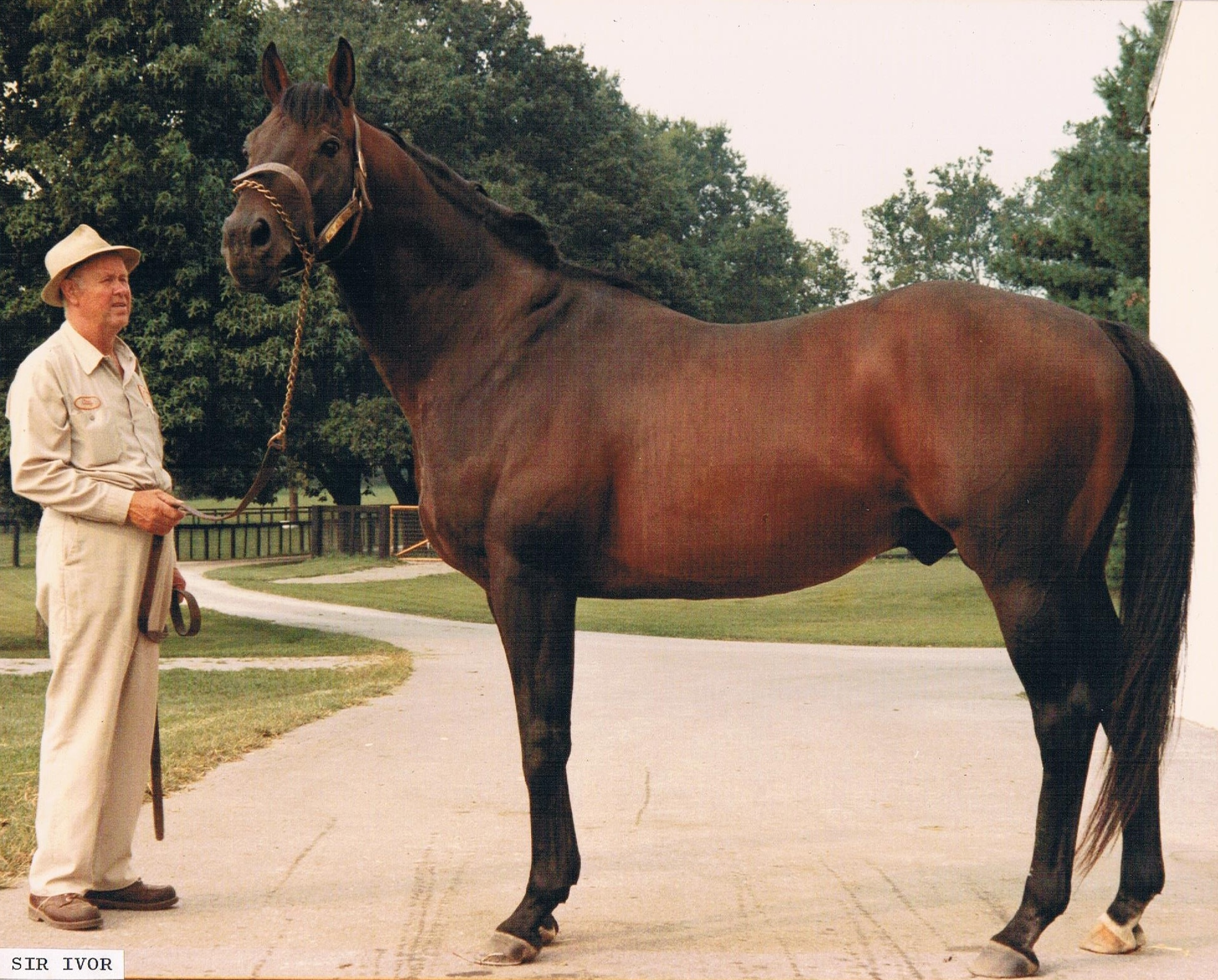
- Sir Ivor at Claiborne Farm in 1981
- Sire: Sir Gaylord
- Grandsire: Turn-To
- Dam: Attica
- Damsire: Mr. Trouble
- Sex: Stallion
- Foaled: 1965
- Country: United States
- Colour: Bay
- Breeder: Mill Ridge Farm
- Owner: Raymond R. Guest
- Trainer: Vincent O'Brien
- Record: 13: 8–3–1
- Earnings: $561,323

Major wins
- Grand Criterium (1967); National Stakes (1967); 2,000 Guineas Trial Stakes (1968); 2,000 Guineas (1968); Epsom Derby (1968); Champion Stakes (1968); Washington, D.C. International (1968)

Awards
- United Kingdom Horse of the Year (1968); Leading broodmare sire in Britain & Ireland (1983); Timeform rating: 135
- Last updated on 23 July 2024

Sir Ivor (5 May 1965 – 10 November 1995) was an American-bred, Irish-trained champion Thoroughbred racehorse and sire. In a career which lasted from July 1967 to October 1968 he ran thirteen times and won eight races. He won major races in four countries: the National Stakes in Ireland, the Grand Criterium in France, the 2000 Guineas, Epsom Derby and Champion Stakes in England and the Washington D.C. International in the United States.

== Background ==
Sir Ivor was bred by Alice Headley Bell at her Mill Ridge Farm in Lexington, Kentucky. He was from the second crop of foals sired by Secretariat's half-brother Sir Gaylord, out of the mare Attica, who produced several other winners. As a yearling the colt was sent to the sales and was bought for $42,000 (equivalent to $420,000 in 2025) by American businessman and U.S. Ambassador to Ireland, Raymond R. Guest, who named the horse after his British grandfather, Sir Ivor Guest, 1st Baron Wimborne. Sir Ivor was sent to Ireland to be trained by Vincent O'Brien at Ballydoyle.

== Racing career ==
=== 1967: two-year-old season ===
Sir Ivor's first three races were at Curragh. In July, he finished sixth in the Tyros Stakes and then won the Probationers' Stakes. He was then stepped up in class and won the National Stakes. On his final start of the year, he was sent to Paris to contest the Grand Criterium at Longchamp Racecourse. He established himself as one of the best European colts of his generation with a three-length win. His jockey Lester Piggott described him as having almost “quickened out from beneath him”, his turn of foot having been so electric.

=== 1968: three-year-old season ===
On his three-year-old debut, Sir Ivor traveled to England for the first time and won the 2000 Guineas Trial Stakes at Ascot. He then started 11/8 favourite for the 2000 Guineas at Newmarket in which his main rival was expected to be the English colt, and champion miler, Petingo. Ridden by Lester Piggott, Sir Ivor accelerated past Petingo in the closing stages to win by one and a half lengths.

At Epsom Sir Ivor was made 4/5 favourite for the Derby. Held up in the early stages by Piggott, he turned into the straight in seventh place. In the final furlong, he produced what the Glasgow Herald described as an "electrifying surge" of speed on the outside to catch the leader Connaught well inside the final furlong and win by one and a half lengths. After the race, Piggott described Sir Ivor as "the best I have ridden." Sir Ivor had now won six races in succession, but his run of success ended in his next race, as he was beaten two lengths by Ribero in the Irish Derby. At that time Liam Ward was retained to ride for O’Brien in Ireland and rode Sir Ivor. Piggott riding Ribero set out to test Sir Ivor's stamina over a stiffer track and held Sir Ivor at bay in the final furlong. Only a week later he was then matched against 1967 Derby winner Royal Palace in the Eclipse Stakes at Sandown. In a closely contested race, Sir Ivor finished third, beaten a short head and three quarters of a length by Royal Palace and Taj Dewan. Both Piggott and O'Brien blamed the firm ground for Sir Ivor's defeat. He was then rested for an autumn campaign.

Sir Ivor returned in late September when he ran in the Prix Henry Delamarre at Longchamp in which he finished half a length second to Prince Sao, to whom he was conceding nine pounds. One week later, he returned to Longchamp for the Prix de l'Arc de Triomphe. Sir Ivor, whose best distance was probably 10 furlongs was outstayed by the favourite, Vaguely Noble, in the very soft ground who won by three lengths. Sir Ivor finished four lengths ahead of the remainder of the field to take second. Two weeks after his run in Paris, Sir Ivor appeared at Newmarket, where he won the Champion Stakes easily by two and a half lengths from a field which included Taj Dewan. On his final start, Sir Ivor was sent to the United States for the Washington, D.C. International at Laurel Park, Maryland. Piggott held the colt up before producing a "furious stretch drive" to lead in the last twenty yards and beat Czar Alexander, with the American Champion Male Turf Horse Fort Marcy, and dual winner of the race (1967 and 1970), in third.

== Stud record ==
Sir Ivor's grave at Claiborne Farm

Retired after his three-year-old racing season, Sir Ivor was sold to a syndicate to stand at stud at Claiborne Farm in Paris, Kentucky. He sired 94 stakes winners and was the broodmare sire of more than 145 stakes winners before his death at age 30 in 1995. His best winners included:

| Foaled | Name | Sex | Major Wins/Achievements |
|---|---|---|---|
| 1971 | Sir Tristram | Stallion | Leading sire in New Zealand; 17 times champion Australasian sire |
| 1972 | Ivanjica | Mare | Poule d'Essai des Pouliches, Prix de l'Arc de Triomphe |
| 1973 | Sir Wimborne | Stallion | Vincent O'Brien National Stakes, Royal Lodge Stakes |
| 1973 | Malinowski | Stallion | Craven Stakes |
| 1974 | Cloonlara | Mare | European Champion Two-Year-Old Filly |
| 1974 | Lady Capulet | Mare | Irish 1,000 Guineas, dam of El Prado |
| 1976 | Godetia | Mare | Irish 1,000 Guineas, Irish Oaks |
| 1979 | Bates Motel | Stallion | American Champion Older Male Horse |
| | Optimistic Gal | Mare | Spinster Stakes, Frizette Stakes, Kentucky Oaks |
| | Sweet Alliance | Mare | Kentucky Oaks |

== Assessment and honours ==
Sir Ivor was named British Horse of the Year by the Racecourse Association, gaining twenty-six of the forty votes to defeat Royal Palace. He was awarded a rating of 135 by Timeform. In their book A Century of Champions, John Randall and Tony Morris rated Sir Ivor as a "superior" Derby winner and the seventh best Irish racehorse of the 20th century. Vincent O'Brien rated Nijinsky and Sir Ivor as the two best horses he had trained, placing Nijinsky first for brilliance and Sir Ivor first for toughness. Vincent Rossiter, a key work rider for O'Brien, believed that Sir Ivor had greater speed even than Triple Crown winner Nijinsky.

Sir Ivor was the subject of the 1969 documentary film The Year of Sir Ivor.

A street in the town of Newmarket, Ontario Canada, was named after Sir Ivor. The street is called Sir Ivor Court and is located in the upper-class neighbourhood of Stonehaven in the southeast corner of the town. Matt Farrell went under the pseudonym Sir Ivor with racing tips in the Evening Press, where he was deputy editor.

== Pedigree ==
Pedigree of Sir Ivor
| Sire Sir Gaylord | Turn-To | Royal Charger | Nearco |
| Sire Sir Gaylord | Turn-To | Royal Charger | Sun Princess |
| Sire Sir Gaylord | Turn-To | Source Sucree | Admiral Drake |
| Sire Sir Gaylord | Turn-To | Source Sucree | Lavendula |
| Sire Sir Gaylord | Somethingroyal | Princequillo | Prince Rose |
| Sire Sir Gaylord | Somethingroyal | Princequillo | Cosquilla |
| Sire Sir Gaylord | Somethingroyal | Imperatrice | Caruso |
| Sire Sir Gaylord | Somethingroyal | Imperatrice | Cinqpace |
| Dam Attica | Mr Trouble | Mahmoud | Blenheim |
| Dam Attica | Mr Trouble | Mahmoud | Mah Mahal |
| Dam Attica | Mr Trouble | Motto | Sir Gallahad |
| Dam Attica | Mr Trouble | Motto | Maxima |
| Dam Attica | Athenia | Pharamond | Phalaris |
| Dam Attica | Athenia | Pharamond | Selene |
| Dam Attica | Athenia | Salamina | Man o' War |
| Dam Attica | Athenia | Salamina | Alcibiades |
