= Cormorant (horse) =

American thoroughbred racehorse

- Sire: His Majesty
- Grandsire: Ribot
- Dam: Song Sparrow
- Damsire: Tudor Minstrel
- Sex: Stallion
- Foaled: April 21, 1974
- Died: May 4, 2007
- Country: USA
- Breeder: Ben Roach
- Owner: Berry C T Jr
- Trainer: James P. Simpson
- Jockey: Danny Wright
- Record: 12:8-2-0
- Earnings: $243,174

Major wins
- Jersey Derby (1977); Gotham Stakes (1977); Bay Shore Stakes (1977)

Cormorant (April 21, 1974 - May 4, 2007) was an American Thoroughbred racehorse and the winner of the 1977 Jersey Derby .

== Racing career ==
Cormorant was purchased for $16,000 and was named after the owner's wife's sailboard. He debuted on June 22, 1976. He had a strong 1976, winning 4 out of 5 races including the October 16, 1976, Nursery Stakes. His winning ways continued into the 1977 season, where he won the Iroquois Handicap and the Grade-3 Bay Shore Stakes in March. He then won the April 9th, 1977, Grade-2 Gotham Stakes. His 7 race winning streak was snapped after a 2nd-place finish at the May 14th, 1977 Grade-2 Withers Stakes. On May 21, 1977, he entered the 1977 Preakness Stakes. He finished in 4th place behind Seattle Slew, Iron Constitution and Run Dusty Run as the 2nd favorite at 4:1 odds. He returned just 9 days later when he won the biggest victory of his career - the Grade-1 1977 Jersey Derby on May 30. He defeated For the Moment by 3 1/2 lengths and netted $124,200. He finished his career on June 19, 1977, with a 2nd-place finish at the Grade-2 Ohio Derby.

== Stud career ==
Cormorant descendants include:

c = colt, g = gelding, f = filly

Foaled	Name	Sex	Major Wins
1984	Grecian Flight	f	First Flight Handicap, Breeders' Cup Handicap
1987	Social Retiree	g	Gailant Man Stakes
1989	Saratoga Dew	f	Beldame Stakes, Gazelle Stakes
1989	Zinc Tamon O (JPN)	c	Kokura Nisai Stakes
1991	Go for Gin	c	1994 Kentucky Derby, Remsen Stakes, Preview Stakes
1991	Mr Angel	c	Palm Beach Stakes
1993	Instant Friendship	c	Red Smith Handicap
1993	Draw Shot	c	Poker Handicap
1996	Gander	g	Meadowlands Cup Handicap, Albany Stakes, Empire Classic Handicap

== Sire line tree ==
- Cormorant
  - Social Retiree
  - Zinc Tamon O
  - Go For Gin
    - Albert the Great
      - Albertus Maximus
      - Nobiz Like Shobiz
      - Moonshine Mullin
    - El Autentico
  - Mr Angel
  - Draw Shot
  - Instant Friendship
  - Gander

== Pedigree ==
Pedigree of Cormorant (USA), 1974
Sire His Majesty (USA) b. 1968	Ribot (GB) b. 1952	Tenerani	Bellini
Sire His Majesty (USA) b. 1968	Ribot (GB) b. 1952	Tenerani	Tofanella
Sire His Majesty (USA) b. 1968	Ribot (GB) b. 1952	Romanella	El Greco
Sire His Majesty (USA) b. 1968	Ribot (GB) b. 1952	Romanella	Barbara Burrini
Sire His Majesty (USA) b. 1968	Flower Bowl (USA) b. 1952	Alibhai	Hyperion*
Sire His Majesty (USA) b. 1968	Flower Bowl (USA) b. 1952	Alibhai	Teresina
Sire His Majesty (USA) b. 1968	Flower Bowl (USA) b. 1952	Flower Red	Beau Pere
Sire His Majesty (USA) b. 1968	Flower Bowl (USA) b. 1952	Flower Red	Boudoir
Dam Song Sparrow (USA) b. 1967	Tudor Minstrel (GB) b. 1944	Owen Tudor	Hyperion*
Dam Song Sparrow (USA) b. 1967	Tudor Minstrel (GB) b. 1944	Owen Tudor	Mary Tudor
Dam Song Sparrow (USA) b. 1967	Tudor Minstrel (GB) b. 1944	Sansonnet	Sansovino
Dam Song Sparrow (USA) b. 1967	Tudor Minstrel (GB) b. 1944	Sansonnet	Lady Juror
Dam Song Sparrow (USA) b. 1967	Swoons Tune (USA) b. 1962	Swoon's Son	The Doge
Dam Song Sparrow (USA) b. 1967	Swoons Tune (USA) b. 1962	Swoon's Son	Swoon
Dam Song Sparrow (USA) b. 1967	Swoons Tune (USA) b. 1962	Recess	Count Fleet
Dam Song Sparrow (USA) b. 1967	Swoons Tune (USA) b. 1962	Recess	Recce

* Cormorant is inbred 4S x 4D to the stallion Hyperion, meaning that he appears fourth generation on the sire side of his pedigree and fourth generation on the dam side of his pedigree.
