= 1994 in sports =

1994 in sports describes the year's events in world sport.

== Alpine skiing ==
- January 29 – death of Ulrike Maier (26), Austrian skier, who broke her neck when she crashed during a World Cup downhill race at Garmisch-Partenkirchen
- Alpine Skiing World Cup
  - Men's overall season champion: Kjetil André Aamodt, Norway
  - Women's overall season champion: Vreni Schneider, Switzerland

== American football ==
- Super Bowl XXVIII – the Dallas Cowboys (NFC) won 30–13 over the Buffalo Bills (AFC)
  - Location: Georgia Dome
  - Attendance: 72,817
  - MVP: Emmitt Smith, RB (Dallas)
  - Note: It is the fourth consecutive Super Bowl appearance by the Bills as well as their fourth consecutive loss. This is also the first (and thus far only) time that the same two teams have met in consecutive Super Bowls.
- Orange Bowl (1993 season):
  - The Florida State Seminoles won 18–16 over the Nebraska Cornhuskers to win the national championship.
- October 23 – in a game where the New Orleans Saints beat the Los Angeles Rams 37–34 Robert Bailey of the Rams sets the NFL record for longest punt return (103 yards) and Tyrone Hughes of the Saints sets the NFL single game record for kickoff return yards (304) and most return yards (347) and ties the single game record for kickoff returns returned for touchdown (2).
- October 31 – In a rainy and windy game at Soldier Field on Monday Night Football, Dick Buktus' and Gale Sayers' Jerseys were retired at Halftime, but the Bears were blown away by Brett Favre and the Packers, 6–33.
- November 13 – Drew Bledsoe sets NFL single game records for pass attempts (70) and pass completions (45) helping New England Patriots beat Minnesota Vikings 26–20.

== Association football ==
- Brazil won the 1994 FIFA World Cup, hosted in the United States
  - July 2 – death of Andrés Escobar, Colombian player, who was shot dead apparently because of an own goal he had scored in a World Cup match

== Athletics ==
- February 20 – in Boston, Massachusetts, Ireland's 41-year-old Eamonn Coghlan becomes the first man over the age of forty to run a sub-four minute mile when he clocks 3min.58.15sec.
- August – 1994 European Championships in Athletics held at Helsinki
- August – 1994 Commonwealth Games held at Victoria, British Columbia, Canada

== Australian rules football ==
- Australian Football League
  - The West Coast Eagles win the 98th AFL premiership (West Coast Eagles 20.23 (143) d Geelong 8.15 (63))
  - Brownlow Medal awarded to Greg Williams (Carlton)in 1994

== Baseball ==
- January 12 – Steve Carlton, winner of 329 games and four Cy Young Awards, is elected to the Baseball Hall of Fame.
- June 22 – OF Ken Griffey Jr. leads the Mariners to a 12–3 win over the Angels by stroking his 31st home run of the season. In doing so, Griffey Jr. breaks Babe Ruth's record for most home runs before the end of June.
- September 14 – A labor strike by Major League Baseball players results in the premature termination of the season, and the cancellation of the World Series for the first time since 1904. The Montreal Expos were the league-leading team up to the strike, with a 74–40 record.
- Mets pitcher John Franco breaks Dave Righetti's major league record for left-handers of 252 career saves.
- The Richmond Braves win the International League championship.
- The Albuquerque Dukes win the Pacific Coast League championship.
- The Indianapolis Indians win the American Association championship.
- The Winnipeg Goldeyes win the Northern League championship.
- The Yomiuri Giants win the Japan Series, and in the view of the baseball media, are World Champions.

== Basketball ==
- NBA Finals - Houston Rockets win four games to three over the New York Knicks
- NCAA men's basketball tournament was won by the University of Arkansas defeating Duke University, 76–72
- NCAA women's basketball tournament was won by the University of North Carolina defeating Louisiana Tech University, 60–59

== Boxing ==
- January 29 – Frankie Randall causes Julio César Chávez his first defeat in 91 professional bouts, winning the WBC world Jr. Welterweight title in the process, by a split decision in 12 rounds.
- November 5 – forty-five-year-old George Foreman becomes boxing's oldest heavyweight champion when he knocked out Michael Moorer in the 10th round of a Las Vegas fight.

== Canadian football ==
- Grey Cup – B.C. Lions win 26–23 over the Baltimore Stallions
- Vanier Cup – Western Ontario Mustangs win 50–40 over the Saskatchewan Huskies

== Cycling ==
- Giro d'Italia won by Eugeni Berzin of Russia
- Tour de France – Miguel Indurain of Spain
- UCI Road World Championships – Men's road race – Luc Leblanc of France
- Djamolidine Abdoujaparov becomes the first cyclist (and only as of 2007) to win the points classification at the Tour de France and Giro d'Italia in the same year.

== Dogsled racing ==
- Iditarod Trail Sled Dog Race Champion –
  - Martin Buser wins with lead dogs: D2 & Dave

== Field hockey ==
- Men's Champions Trophy: Pakistan
- Men's World Cup: Pakistan
- Women's World Cup: Australia

== Figure skating ==
- World Figure Skating Championships –
  - Men's champion: Elvis Stojko, Canada
  - Ladies' champion: Yuka Sato, Japan
  - Pairs' champions: Evgenia Shishkova and Vadim Naumov, Russia
  - Ice dancing champions: Oksana Grishuk and Evgeny Platov, Russia

== Floorball ==
- Floorball European Championship – Men's champion: Sweden
- European Cup
  - Men's champion: Balrog IK
  - Women's champion: Sjöstad IF

== Gaelic Athletic Association ==
- Camogie
  - All-Ireland Camogie Champion: Kilkenny
  - National Camogie League: Galway
- Gaelic football
  - All-Ireland Senior Football Championship – Down 1–12 v Dublin 0–13
  - National Football League – Meath 2–11 v Armagh 0–8
- Ladies' Gaelic football
  - All-Ireland Senior Football Champion: Waterford
  - National Football League: Monaghan
- Hurling
  - All-Ireland Senior Hurling Championship – Offaly 3–16 v Limerick 2–13
  - National Hurling League – Tipperary 2–14 beat Galway

== Golf ==
Men's professional

- Masters Tournament – José María Olazábal
- U.S. Open – Ernie Els
- British Open – Nick Price
- PGA Championship – Nick Price
- PGA Tour money leader – Nick Price – $1,499,927
- Senior PGA Tour money leader – Dave Stockton – $1,402,519

Men's amateur

- British Amateur – Lee James
- U.S. Amateur – Tiger Woods becomes the youngest man ever to win the U.S. Amateur, at age 18.
- European Amateur – Stephen Gallacher

Women's professional

- Nabisco Dinah Shore – Donna Andrews
- LPGA Championship – Laura Davies
- U.S. Women's Open – Patty Sheehan
- Classique du Maurier – Martha Nause
- LPGA Tour money leader – Laura Davies – $687,201
- Solheim Cup won by the United States team who beat the European team 13 to 7.

== Handball ==
- Men's European Championship: Sweden
- Women's European Championship: Denmark

== Harness racing ==
- North America Cup – Cam's Card Shark
- United States Pacing Triple Crown races –
  1. Cane Pace – Falcons Future
  2. Little Brown Jug – Magical Mike
  3. Messenger Stakes – Cam's Card Shark
- United States Trotting Triple Crown races –
  1. Hambletonian – Victory Dream
  2. Yonkers Trot – Bullville Victory
  3. Kentucky Futurity – Bullville Victory
- Australian Inter Dominion Harness Racing Championship –
  - Pacers: Weona Warrior
  - Trotters: Diamond Field

== Horse racing ==
Steeplechases

- Cheltenham Gold Cup – The Fellow
- Grand National – Miinnehoma

Flat races

- Australia – Melbourne Cup won by Jeune
- Canada – Queen's Plate won by Basqueian
- France – Prix de l'Arc de Triomphe won by Carnegie
- Ireland – Irish Derby Stakes won by Balanchine
- Japan
  - Narita Brian won the Satsuki Sho (Japanese 2,000 Guineas), Tokyo Yushun (Japanese Derby), and Kikuka Sho (Japanese St. Leger) to become the first horse since 1984 to win the Japanese Triple Crown.
  - Japan Cup won by Marvelous Crown
- English Triple Crown Races:
  1. 2,000 Guineas Stakes – Mister Baileys
  2. The Derby – Erhaab
  3. St. Leger Stakes – Moonax
- United States Triple Crown Races:
  1. Kentucky Derby – Go for Gin
  2. Preakness Stakes – Tabasco Cat
  3. Belmont Stakes – Tabasco Cat
- Breeders' Cup World Thoroughbred Championships:
  1. Breeders' Cup Classic – Concern
  2. Breeders' Cup Distaff – One Dreamer
  3. Breeders' Cup Juvenile – Timber Country
  4. Breeders' Cup Juvenile Fillies – Flanders
  5. Breeders' Cup Mile – Barathea
  6. Breeders' Cup Sprint – Cherokee Run
  7. Breeders' Cup Turf – Tikkanen

== Ice hockey ==
- January 4 - Canada won gold in the World Junior. Sweden was silver and Russia was bronze.
- February 27 - Sweden won gold medal in the Winter Olympics. Canada won silver and Finland, bronze.
- May 8 - Canada won gold at the World Championship. Finland was silver and Sweden, bronze.
- June 14 – The New York Rangers won the Stanley Cup for the 1993–1994 season four games to three over the Vancouver Canucks, ending a 54-year drought.
- October 1 – The NHL locked out its players and the regular season was put on hold for the next 3½ months and the season began under a 48-game schedule through 1995.
- Art Ross Trophy as the NHL's leading scorer during the regular season: Wayne Gretzky, Los Angeles Kings
- Hart Memorial Trophy – for the NHL's Most Valuable Player: Sergei Fedorov – Detroit Red Wings
- World Hockey Championship
  - Men's champion: Canada defeated Finland
  - Junior Men's champion: Canada defeated Sweden
  - Women's champion: Canada defeated the United States

== Kickboxing ==
The following is a list of major noteworthy kickboxing events during 1994 in chronological order.

Before 2000, K-1 was considered the only major kickboxing promotion in the world.

Date	Event	Location	Attendance	Notes
March 4	K-1 Challenge	Tokyo, Japan	15,000	
April 30	K-1 Grand Prix '94	Tokyo, Japan	11,000	Second K-1 World Grand Prix. Tournament features eight competitors, rather than sixteen like the year before.
May 8	K-2 Plus Tournament 1994	Amsterdam, Netherlands		Features eight-man light heavyweight (76–79 kg/167-174 lbs) tournament. First K-1 event held outside Japan.
September 18	K-1 Revenge	Tokyo, Japan	14,000	
December 10	K-1 Legend	Nagoya, Japan	9,550	First K-1 event to feature a mixed martial arts bout.

== Lacrosse ==
- The 7th World Lacrosse Championship is held in Manchester, England. The United States win and Australia is the runner-up.
- The Philadelphia Wings beat the Buffalo Bandits 26–15 in the Major Indoor Lacrosse League Championship.
- The Six Nations Chiefs win the Mann Cup.
- The Orillia Rogers Kings win the Founders Cup.
- The New Westminster Salmonbellies win the Minto Cup.

== Mixed martial arts ==
The following is a list of major noteworthy MMA events during 1994 in chronological order.

Before 1997, the Ultimate Fighting Championship (UFC) was considered the only major MMA organization in the world and featured many fewer rules than are used in modern MMA.

Date	Event	Alternate Name/s	Location	Attendance	PPV Buyrate	Notes
March 11	UFC 2: No Way Out	UFC 2 The Ultimate Fighting Championship 2	(United States) Denver, Colorado, US	2,000	300,000	UFC rule change, time limits were dropped. Groin strikes became legal again, however still illegal to grab the genitals. Cage design was modified. The first and only sixteen-man tournament in UFC history.
September 9	UFC 3: The American Dream	—N/a	(United States) Charlotte, North Carolina, US	—N/a	—N/a	UFC rule change, referee is officially given the right to stop a fight. Kicking with shoes is banned, however this rule was quickly discarded.
December 16	UFC 4: Revenge of the Warriors	—N/a	(United States) Tulsa, Oklahoma, US	5,857	—N/a	UFC rule change, After tournament alternate Steve Jennum won UFC 3 by winning only one bout, alternates (replacements) were required to win a pre-tournament bout to qualify for the role of an alternate.

== Multi-sport event ==
- 1994 Commonwealth Games held in Victoria, British Columbia, Canada

== Professional Wrestling ==
- June 11 Hulk Hogan signs with World Championship Wrestling.

== Radiosport ==
- Seventh Amateur Radio Direction Finding World Championship held in Södertälje, Sweden.

== Rugby league ==
- 30 April – 1993–94 Challenge Cup final is won by Wigan 26–16 over Leeds at Wembley Stadium before 78,348
- 1 June – 1994 World Club Challenge match is won by Wigan 20–14 over Brisbane Broncos at Queensland Sport & Athletics Centre before 54,220
- 20 June – 1994 State of Origin is won by New South Wales in the third and deciding game of the three-match series against Queensland at Lang Park before 40,665
- 25 September – 1994 NSWRL season Grand Final is won by Canberra Raiders 36–12 over Canterbury-Bankstown Bulldogs at Sydney Football Stadium before 42,234
- 15 November – 1994 Ashes are retained by Australia in the third and deciding game of the three–match series against Great Britain at Elland Road before 39,468
- 4 December – Béziers, France: Australian captain Mal Meninga plays the last game of his illustrious career, leading Australia to a 74–0 victory over France and scoring the final try of the game

== Rugby union ==
- 100th Five Nations Championship series is won by Wales

== Snooker ==
- World Snooker Championship – Stephen Hendry beats Jimmy White 18–17
- World rankings – Stephen Hendry remains world number one for 1994/95

== Speed skating ==
- February 18 - Dan Jansen skates world record 1000 meter (1:12.43) in Hamar

== Swimming ==
- Seventh FINA World Championships, held in Rome, Italy (September 1 – 11)
- Fourth European Sprint Championships, held in Stavanger, Norway (December 3 – 4)
  - Germany wins the most medals (13), and the most gold medals (7)
- March 13 – Alexander Popov clocks 21.50 to break the world record in the men's 50m freestyle (short course) in Desenzano del Garda, Italy

== Tennis ==
- Grand Slam in tennis men's results:
  1. Australian Open – Pete Sampras
  2. French Open – Sergi Bruguera
  3. Wimbledon championships – Pete Sampras
  4. U.S. Open – Andre Agassi
- Grand Slam in tennis women's results:
  1. Australian Open – Steffi Graf
  2. French Open – Arantxa Sánchez Vicario
  3. Wimbledon championships – Conchita Martínez
  4. U.S. Open – Arantxa Sánchez Vicario
- Davis Cup – Sweden wins 4–1 over Russia.
- Federation Cup – In the last event to be called the "Federation Cup", Spain wins 3–0 over the USA. The following year would see the event renamed the Fed Cup.

== Triathlon ==
- ITU World Championships held in Wellington, New Zealand
- ITU World Cup (ten races) started in Japan and ended in Mexico
- ETU European Championships held in Eichstätt, Germany

== Volleyball ==
- Men's World League: Italy
- Men's World Championship: Italy
- Men's European Beach Volleyball Championships: Jan Kvalheim and Bjørn Maaseide (Norway)
- Women's World Grand Prix: Brazil
- Women's World Championship: Cuba
- Women's European Beach Volleyball Championships: Beate Bühler and Danja Müsch (Germany)

== Water polo ==
- Men's World Championship: Italy
- Women's World Championship: Hungary

== Wrestling ==
- World Wrestling Championships
  - Men's Freestyle Team: Turkey
  - Men's Greco-Roman Team: Russia
  - Women's Team: Japan
- NCAA Wrestling team championship won by Oklahoma State University

(see links, above, for individual medals)

== Awards ==
- Associated Press Male Athlete of the Year – George Foreman, Boxing
- Associated Press Female Athlete of the Year – Bonnie Blair, Speed skating
