= Albert the Great (horse) =

American thoroughbred racehorse

- Breed: Thoroughbred
- Sire: Go for Gin
- Grandsire: Cormorant
- Dam: Bright Feather
- Damsire: Fappiano
- Foaled: May 7, 1997
- Died: November 19, 2021 (aged 24)
- Country: USA
- Breeder: Albert G. Clay
- Owner: Tracy Farmer
- Trainer: Nicholas P. Zito
- Record: 22: 8-6-4
- Earnings: $3,012,490

Major wins
- Jockey Club Gold Cup (2000); Dwyer Stakes (2000); Widener Handicap (2001); Brooklyn Handicap (2001); Suburban Handicap (2001)

Albert the Great (May 7, 1997 – November 19, 2021) was an American Thoroughbred racehorse and the winner of the 2000 Jockey Club Gold Cup.

== Career ==
Albert the Great's first race was on January 22, 2000, at Gulfstream Park, where he came in 3rd. He won his first race on April 22, 2000, at Keeneland.

His first major win came on July 9, 2000, when he won the Dwyer Stakes. In that race he finished ahead of Red Bullet the winner of that year's Preakness Stakes, and Commendable the winner of that year's Belmont stakes.

Later that summer, on August 26, he ran a game 2nd in the prestigious Travers Stakes. His runner up finish was eye opening to many observers considering that a miscalculation on the part of the jockey Jorge F. Chavez to put Albert on the dead Saratoga rail gave a huge advantage to Shane Sellers and Unshaded riding to his outside.

He did not win again until October 14, 2000, when he won the 2000 Jockey Club Gold Cup. by six lengths.

He came in 4th place in the 2000 Breeders' Cup Classic. Finishing ahead of Fusaichi Pegasus his three year old counterpart who won the Kentucky Derby earlier in the year.

He picked up his next win at the Grade 3 Widener Handicap on March 24, 2001.

He then got a pair of victories in Summer 2001, when he won the Brooklyn Handicap and the Suburban Handicap.

He tried to win the Jockey Club Gold Cup for a second time in October 2001, but came in 4th. In his final race on October 27, 2001, he tried again to win the Breeders' Cup Classic, but came in 3rd place.

== Stud career ==
Albert the Great's descendants include:

c = colt, f = filly

Foaled	Name	Sex	Major Wins
2004	Nobiz Like Shobiz	c	Wood Memorial Stakes, Belmont Derby, Kent Stakes, Holy Bull Stakes, Remsen Stakes
2004	Albertus Maximus	c	Donn Handicap, Windy Sands Handicap
2008	Moonshine Mullin	c	Stephen Foster Handicap, Alysheba Stakes

== Retirement ==
In 2017, Albert the Great was retired to Old Friends in Georgetown, Kentucky; he joined his son Nobiz Like Shobiz, who retired there in 2016.

== Pedigree ==
Pedigree of Albert the Great (USA), 1997
Sire Go for Gin (USA) 1991	Cormorant (USA); 1974	His Majesty	Ribot
Sire Go for Gin (USA) 1991	Cormorant (USA); 1974	His Majesty	Flower Bowl
Sire Go for Gin (USA) 1991	Cormorant (USA); 1974	Song Sparrow	Tudor Minstrel
Sire Go for Gin (USA) 1991	Cormorant (USA); 1974	Song Sparrow	Swoons Tune
Sire Go for Gin (USA) 1991	Never Knock (USA); 1979	Stage Door Johnny	Prince John
Sire Go for Gin (USA) 1991	Never Knock (USA); 1979	Stage Door Johnny	Peroxide Blonde
Sire Go for Gin (USA) 1991	Never Knock (USA); 1979	Never Hula	Never Bend
Sire Go for Gin (USA) 1991	Never Knock (USA); 1979	Never Hula	Hula Hula
Dam Bright Feather (CAN) 1989	Fappiano (USA); 1977	Mr. Prospector	Raise a Native
Dam Bright Feather (CAN) 1989	Fappiano (USA); 1977	Mr. Prospector	Gold Digger
Dam Bright Feather (CAN) 1989	Fappiano (USA); 1977	Killaloe	Dr. Fager
Dam Bright Feather (CAN) 1989	Fappiano (USA); 1977	Killaloe	Grand Splendor
Dam Bright Feather (CAN) 1989	In My Cap (CAN); 1982	Vice Regent	Northern Dancer
Dam Bright Feather (CAN) 1989	In My Cap (CAN); 1982	Vice Regent	Victoria Regina
Dam Bright Feather (CAN) 1989	In My Cap (CAN); 1982	Passing Look	Buckpasser
Dam Bright Feather (CAN) 1989	In My Cap (CAN); 1982	Passing Look	Gay Meeting (family: 16-h)
