= His Majesty (horse) =

American-bred Thoroughbred racehorse

- Sire: Ribot
- Grandsire: Tenerani
- Dam: Flower Bowl
- Damsire: Alibhai
- Sex: Stallion
- Foaled: 1968
- Country: United States
- Colour: Bay
- Breeder: John W. Galbreath
- Owner: Darby Dan Farm
- Trainer: Lou Rondinello
- Record: 22: 5-6-3
- Earnings: US$99,430

Major wins
- Everglades Stakes (1971)

Awards
- Leading sire in North America (1982)
- Last updated on January 23, 2010

His Majesty (April 17, 1968 – September 21, 1995) was an American Thoroughbred racehorse and leading sire in North America.

== Background ==
His Majesty was bred by John W. Galbreath and raced under the colors of his Darby Dan Farm. A full brother to Graustark, His Majesty was a son of the undefeated European runner and three-time Leading sire in Great Britain and Ireland, Ribot. His dam was a runner and outstanding broodmare, Flower Bowl who hemorrhaged to death the morning after his birth. His Majesty was trained by Lou Rondinello.

== Racing career ==
=== 1971: Three-Year-Old Season ===
At age three, His Majesty started 1971 at Florida's Hialeah Park Race Track where he won two of his first three starts.

Then he recovered from being forced into the rail and stumbling badly to finish third in the Bahamas Stakes.

He then won the Everglades Stakes on February 17 under jockey Braulio Baeza.

Injured in the Flamingo Stakes in which he finished sixth, His Majesty underwent surgery for a broken bone in his right front ankle and was sidelined for nine months.

=== 1972: Four-Year-Old Season ===
Racing at age four, His Majesty finished second by a nose to stablemate Good Counsel in the Widener Handicap at Hialeah Park on March 25. He was injured again while preparing for the May 30 Hawthorne Gold Cup and was out of racing for another five months. Returning to race at Hialeah Park in January 1973, His Majesty set a new track record of 1:46 2/5 for a mile and an eighth on dirt but in the ensuing March 10, 1973 Donn Handicap he suffered a tendon injury that ended his racing career.

== Stud Record ==
Retired to stud duty at Darby Dan Farm in Lexington, Kentucky, His Majesty became an influential sire of more than fifty stakes winners as well as a prominent broodmare sire. Among his most notable progeny were:

- Asaltante (1974) - winner of the Handicap de las Américas
- Mehmet (1978) - a multiple stakes winner including the Philip H. Iselin Stakes
- Pleasant Colony (1978) - winner of the Kentucky Derby and Preakness Stakes, and the 1981 American Champion Three-Year-Old Male Horse
- Majesty's Prince (1979) - winner of the Canadian International Stakes in 1982 and 1984, the Man o' War Stakes in 1983 and 1984, and the Sword Dancer Handicap in 1983 and 1984
- Country Pine (1980) - winner of the Withers Stakes
- Tight Spot (1987) - the 1991 American Champion Male Turf Horse and winner of the Arlington Million, Eddie Read Handicap, and Del Mar Derby

Through his daughter, Razyana, His Majesty is the damsire of the international sire Danehill.

His Majesty was the grandsire of the 1993 Belmont Stakes winner Colonial Affair and of the 1994 Kentucky Derby winner Go For Gin. He was also the damsire of:

- Risen Star - winner of the 1988 Preakness Stakes and Belmont Stakes
- Risen Moon - winner of the 1990 Cambridgeshire Handicap in England
- Midway Lady - winner of the 1985 Prix Marcel Boussac and the 1986 1,000 Guineas Stakes and Epsom Oaks
- Parade Ground - winner of the 1998 Lawrence Realization Stakes, National Museum of Racing Hall of Fame Handicap, Belmont Lexington Stakes, and Tampa Bay Derby

His Majesty died at age 27 on September 21, 1995, from the infirmities of old age. He is buried in the Darby Dan Farm equine cemetery.

== Sire line tree ==
- His Majesty
  - Asaltante
  - Cormorant
    - Social Retiree
    - Zinc Tamon O
    - Go For Gin
      - Albert the Great
        - Albertus Maximus
        - Nobiz Like Shobiz
        - Moonshine Mullin
      - El Autentico
    - Mr Angel
    - Draw Shot
    - Instant Friendship
    - Gander
  - Obraztstovy
  - Pleasant Colony
    - Lac Ouimet
    - Pleasant Variety
    - Cherokee Colony
      - Cherokeeinthehills
    - Pleasant Tap
      - Pleasant Breeze
      - Tap Dance City
      - David Junior
      - Premium Tap
        - Aan Alawaan
        - Amtae
        - Aelam Beladi
      - Tiago
        - Viva Majorca
      - Sahara Sky
        - Sky Judge
    - Roanoke
    - Sir Beaufort
    - St Jovite
      - Amerique
    - Colonial Affair
      - Cafrune
    - Behrens
    - Forbidden Apple
      - Forbidden Bear
    - Colonial Colony
    - Denon
    - Pleasantly Perfect
      - Rapid Redux
      - Idalino
      - Whitmore
      - King Of The Sun
      - Secret Lover
    - Official Visit
      - Almobeer
  - Mehmet
  - Panjandrum
  - Majesty's Prince
    - Dr Kiernan
  - Country Pine
  - Pi Phi Prince
  - Tight Spot
    - Bravo Green
  - Valiant Nature
  - Cetewayo

== Pedigree ==
Pedigree of His Majesty
Sire Ribot	Tenerani	Bellini	Cavaliere d'Arpino
Sire Ribot	Tenerani	Bellini	Bella Minna
Sire Ribot	Tenerani	Tofanella	Apelle
Sire Ribot	Tenerani	Tofanella	Try Try Again
Sire Ribot	Romanella	El Greco	Pharos
Sire Ribot	Romanella	El Greco	Gay Gamp
Sire Ribot	Romanella	Barbara Burrini	Papyrus*
Sire Ribot	Romanella	Barbara Burrini	Bucolic
Dam Flower Bowl	Alibhai	Hyperion	Gainsborough
Dam Flower Bowl	Alibhai	Hyperion	Selene
Dam Flower Bowl	Alibhai	Teresina	Tracery*
Dam Flower Bowl	Alibhai	Teresina	Blue Tit
Dam Flower Bowl	Flower Bed	Beau Pere	Son-in-Law
Dam Flower Bowl	Flower Bed	Beau Pere	Cinna
Dam Flower Bowl	Flower Bed	Boudoir	Mahmoud
Dam Flower Bowl	Flower Bed	Boudoir	Kampala

* His Majesty is inbred 5S x 4D to the stallion Tracery, meaning that he appears fifth generation (via Papyrus) on the sire side of his pedigree and fourth generation on the dam side of his pedigree.
