= Winslow Homer (horse) =

American-bred Thoroughbred racehorse

- Sire: Unbridled's Song
- Grandsire: Unbridled
- Dam: Summer Raven
- Damsire: Summer Squall
- Sex: Colt
- Foaled: 2007
- Country: United States
- Colour: Gray
- Breeder: Fox Hill Farms (Rick Porter)
- Owner: Fox Hill Farms
- Trainer: Tony Dutrow
- Record: 11: 4-1-3
- Earnings: $273,365

Major wins
- Holy Bull Stakes (2010); Curlin Stakes (2010)

Winslow Homer (foaled January 30, 2007) is an American thoroughbred racehorse best known for winning the 2010 Holy Bull Stakes.

== Background ==
Bred in Kentucky by Overbrook Farm, Winslow Homer is a gray horse with three white socks and a white blaze. He was sired by Unbridled's Song, the sire of many notable horses such as Arrogate, Will Take Charge, and Forever Unbridled. His dam, Summer Raven, won the Tempted Stakes as a juvenile and placed in two other stakes.

Winslow Homer is a half-brother to multiple Gr.II winner Lewis Bay and full brother to General George Handicap winner Misconnect.

Rick Porter, under his banner Fox Hill Farm, purchased Winslow Homer for $310,000 at the 2008 Keeneland September Yearling Sale. He was the highest-priced yearling of his class by his stallion. Named for the artist, Winslow Homer was trained by Anthony W. Dutrow.

== Racing career ==
Winslow Homer made his racing debut on July 28, 2009, in a maiden race at Delaware Park, finishing third by a neck. He broke his maiden next out in a maiden race at Saratoga, and won again at Philadelphia Park in an allowance by a 12 ½ length margin.

Winslow Homer made his first start as a sophomore in the Holy Bull Stakes, a race that was both his stakes and graded stakes debut. Breaking from the 6 starting gate at odds of 7-2, Winslow Homer won the race by a length over Jackson Bend. His final time was 1:35.97. After his win, Winslow Homer was considered an early favorite for the Kentucky Derby, but was sidelined with a stress fracture and did not make the race. He didn't race again until June, when he finished third in the Iowa Derby behind Concord Point and Thiskyhasnolimit. The colt next won the listed Curlin Stakes at Saratoga by 9 lengths in what was the final win of his career. After the Curlin Stakes, Winslow Homer was sidelined again with a colyndar fracture in his left foreleg.

Winslow Homer returned the next year in March, contesting the 2011 Razorback Handicap as the 9-5 favorite. Winslow Homer trailed towards the end of the field for most of the race, before moving up to fourth at the top of the stretch. Winslow Homer did not hold long and he faded back into 6th place. He fared much better next-out in the Oaklawn Handicap, finishing third. He did not race again until October, finishing second and fifth in two allowance races. He did not race

Winslow Homer was again sidelined and did not race in 2012. He finished fourth in his final start in the listed Super Stakes at Tampa Bay Downs, in September 2013. He retired with four wins, one second, and three thirds from 11 stars, and earnings of $273,365.

== Retirement and Stud Career ==
Winslow Homer was retired to Brent and Crystal Fernung's Journeyman Stud in Ocala, Florida. His stud fee for his first year as a stallion was $5,000.

Winslow Homer's first winner was the filly Cloe Raven. She won a maiden race at Louisiana Downs on July 1, 2017. She was the favorite, let from start to finish, and won by more than six lengths.
