= Kent Stakes =

- Class: Listed
- Location: Delaware Park Racetrack; Stanton, Delaware, United States
- Inaugurated: 1937
- Race type: Thoroughbred – Flat racing
- Website: www.delawarepark.com

Race information
- Distance: 1 3/8 miles (11 furlongs)
- Surface: Turf
- Track: Left-handed
- Qualification: Three-year-olds
- Weight: 124 lbs. with allowances
- Purse: US$250,000 (2023)

The Kent Stakes is a Listed American race for Thoroughbred race horses, age three, run on the turf at Delaware Park Racetrack located in Stanton, Delaware. Set at a distance of one and three eighth mile (11 furlongs), the race currently offers a purse of $250,000.

In 2011, due to heavy rain, this turf race was held on the main track. Because of this, the number of horses contesting was reduced by scratches from 13 to 6.

First run in 1937 when Delaware Park opened, there was no Kent Stakes run in 1943, 1977–1978, 1980–1981, and 1983–1995.

In 2023 the American Graded Stakes Committee downgraded the event to a Listed race.

== Distances since inception ==
1937 – 1968, 1979, 1982 : 1 1/16 miles
1969 – 1976 : 1 mile
1996 – 2022 : 1 1/8 miles
2023 – present : 1 3/8 miles

== Records ==
=== Speed record ===
1 1/8 miles – 1:46.94 – Gufo (2020)

Most wins by a jockey:

- 4 – Ramon Domínguez: (2001, 2003, 2005, 2010)

Most wins by a trainer:

- 4 – William I. Mott: (2002, 2005, 2008, 2015)

Most wins by an owner:

- 2 – Live Oak Plantation: (2002, 2005)

== Winners since 1999 ==
| Year | Winner | Jockey | Trainer | Owner | Time |
|---|---|---|---|---|---|
| 2026* | McCready | Carol Cedeno | McLean Robertson | Novogratz Racing Stables, Inc. (Joe Novogratz) | 1:53.50 |
| 2025 | Soleil Volant | Sameul Marin | H. Graham Motion | Jacques Dupuis Jr., Luke Bourque, Bobby Sutton | 1:50.73 |
| 2024 | Desvio | Ben Curtis | Madison F. Meyers | Stonelea Stables LLC | 2:16.39 |
| 2023 | Really Good | Ruben Silvera | Michael J. Maker | Paradise Farms Corp, David Staudacher & Jason Ash | 2:17.89 |
| 2022 | Main Event | Eric Cancel | George Weaver | Harrell Ventures LLC | 1:48.74 |
| 2021 | Yes This Time | Joe Bravo | Kelly J. Breen | Edge Racing | 1:52.39 |
| 2020 | Gufo | Trevor McCarthy | Christophe Clement | Otter Bend Stables LLC | 1:46.94 |
| 2019 | Eons | Trevor McCarthy | Arnaud Delacour | Mark B. Grier | 1:49.26 |
| 2018 | Golden Brown | Jairo Rendon | Patrick B. McBurney | ABL Stable, D. Bossone, et al. | 1:48.06 |
| 2017 | Frostmourne | Joel Rosario | Christophe Clement | Green Lantern Stables | 1:49.95 |
| 2016 | American Patriot | José L. Ortiz | Todd A. Pletcher | WinStar Farm | 1:47.19 |
| 2015 | Syntax | Junior Alvarado | William I. Mott | Matthew Schera | 1:49.77 |
| 2014 | Divine Oath | Jose C. Caraballo | Todd Pletcher | Let's Go Stable | 1:47.78 |
| 2013 | Are You Kidding Me | Rajiv Maragh | Roger L. Attfield | Kirk/Bates/Riordan | 1:47.61 |
| 2012 | Optimizer | Jon Court | D. Wayne Lukas | Bluegrass Hall | 1:47.27 |
| 2011* | I'm Steppin' It Up | Jeremy Rose | Tony Pecoraro | Roman Hill Farm | 1:50.50 |
| 2010 | Grand Rapport | Ramon Domínguez | Gary Contessa | Earle I. Mack | 1:48.77 |
| 2009 | No Inflation | Rosemary Homeister Jr. | Thomas Proctor | Glen Hill Farm | 1:48.29 |
| 2008 | Adriano | Kent Desormeaux | William I. Mott | Donald Adam | 1:52.54 |
| 2007 | Nobiz Like Shobiz | Javier Castellano | Barclay Tagg | Elizabeth J. Valando | 1:49.60 |
| 2006 | Brilliant | Mark Guidry | Neil J. Howard | Mill House Stable | 1:56.63 |
| 2005 | Seeking Slew | Ramon Domínguez | William I. Mott | Live Oak Plantation Racing | 1:47.32 |
| 2004 | Timo | Richard Migliore | William Badgett Jr. | C. K. Woods Stable | 1:55.75 |
| 2003 | Foufa's Warrior | Ramon Domínguez | Lawrence E. Murray | Sondra D. Bender | 1:47.44 |
| 2002 | Miesque's Approval | Jerry Bailey | William I. Mott | Live Oak Plantation Racing | 1:48.81 |
| 2001 | Navesink | Ramon Domínguez | Alan E. Goldberg | Jayeff B Stables (Richard Santulli, managing partner) | 1:49.98 |
| 2000 | Three Wonders | Pat Day | W. Elliott Walden | Mark H. Stanley | 1:48.95 |
| 1999 | North East Bound | José A. Vélez Jr. | William W. Perry | Julian Demarco & Richard Disano | 1:51.93 |

- Due to heavy rains that left the grass course unusable, the 2011 and 2026 race was run on a sloppy main track.
