= Billy Turner =

American horse trainer (1940–2021)

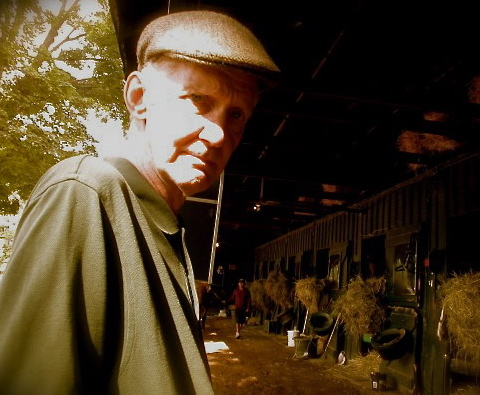
- Turner in 2008

Personal information
- Full name: William H. Turner Jr.
- Born: February 29, 1940 Rochester, New York, U.S.
- Died: December 31, 2021 (aged 81) Reddick, Florida, U.S.
- Occupation: Trainer

Horse racing career
- Sport: Horse racing
- Career winnings: $17,501,009 (1976-2016)
- Career wins: 533 (1976-2016)

Major racing wins
- Remsen Stakes (1967); Nashua Stakes (1975, 1993); Champagne Stakes (1976); Flamingo Stakes (1977); Wood Memorial Stakes (1977); Jerome Handicap (1979); Withers Stakes (1979, 1984); Carter Handicap (1980); Metropolitan Handicap (1980); Damon Runyon Stakes (1981); Lexington Stakes (1983); Shirley Jones Handicap (1996); Bold Ruler Handicap (1989, 1997); Delaware Handicap (1995); Fall Highweight Handicap (1998); Maryland Million Sprint Handicap (1996); Garden City Breeder's Cup (2000); Sands Point Stakes (2000); Athenia Handicap (2004); Beaugay Handicap (2005) American Classic Race wins: Kentucky Derby (1977); Preakness Stakes (1977); Belmont Stakes (1977); United States Triple Crown (1977)

Significant horses
- Czaravich, Finery, Gaviola, Salerno, Seattle Slew, Play On, Punch Line
- Updated on December 31, 2021

William H. Turner Jr. (February 29, 1940 – December 31, 2021) was an American Thoroughbred flat racing trainer best known for winning the United States Triple Crown of Thoroughbred Racing in 1977 with Seattle Slew.

Turner maintained a public training stable and bloodstock consulting services, operating mainly in New York, Florida, and the Mid-Atlantic region. At the time of his retirement he had been training horses competing on the New York Racing Association circuit.

== Early life and career ==
Born in Rochester, New York on February 29, 1940, Turner grew up riding and fox hunting in Pennsylvania's horse country and began his career with racehorses in 1958 as a steeplechase jockey. Working under Hall of Fame trainer Burley Cocks, Turner rode over jumps until 1963 when his 6'2" height made race riding unrealistic. He continued as an assistant trainer until he went out on his own in 1966. He saw immediate success with Salerno, a horse who won the Remsen Stakes in 1967 and placed in the Withers Stakes in 1968.

== Seattle Slew ==
In 1975, Turner was handed a colt by Bold Reasoning that had been purchased at a Lexington yearling auction for $17,500 by a partnership led by Karen and Mickey Taylor. Turner began to train the colt, named Seattle Slew, at Andor Farm in Monkton, Maryland. Seattle Slew went undefeated in his two-year-old racing season and was named Champion Two-Year-Old Male. In 1977, the Turner-trained Seattle Slew became racing's tenth Triple Crown champion by sweeping the Kentucky Derby, Preakness Stakes and Belmont Stakes. Seattle Slew, who would go on to be named Horse of the Year, was one of only two Triple Crown winners to have entered the Derby undefeated; the other was Justify.

After the Triple Crown, a disagreement occurred between Turner, who wanted to give Seattle Slew a rest, and the owners, who wanted to run him in three weeks at the Swaps Stakes at Hollywood Park. After a fourth-place finish in the Swaps, Turner was fired as Seattle Slew's trainer and the colt was handed over to trainer Doug Petersen. While Turner continued to insist that he did not want to run the horse in the Swaps, Seattle Slew's owners alleged that Turner had a drinking problem which was putting the horse at risk.

== Later career ==
Two years after Seattle Slew's Triple Crown run, Turner trained a chestnut colt named Czaravich who won or placed in all of his 13 starts, including victories in the Carter Handicap, Withers Stakes, Jerome Handicap and Metropolitan Handicap.

In 1984, Turner conditioned Welcome Farm's colt Play On, who won that year's Withers Stakes and finished second to Gate Dancer in the Preakness.

From 1995 to 1999, Turner trained Althea Richard's Punch Line, a horse he referred to as "the second best horse I ever trained." A winner of 21 races from ages 2 to 8, Punch Line was named Virginia's Horse of the Year and champion sprinter in 1997 and 1998. At the age of 8, he won the Fall Highweight Handicap carrying 136 pounds.

Turner retired from training in 2016 and moved to Ocala, Florida. He retired with 533 career wins and earnings in excess of $17 million, though these statistics only go back as far as 1976 when Equibase began keeping race records.

== Personal life ==
Turner was married to former jockey and exercise rider Patricia Rich 'Patti' Turner and had two children from previous marriages.

He entered hospice care in late December 2021 after being diagnosed with prostate cancer in early 2020. He died on December 31, at the age of 81.
