= Harlem Rocker =

Canadian-bred Thoroughbred racehorse

- Sire: Macho Uno
- Grandsire: Holy Bull
- Dam: Freedom Come
- Damsire: Lit de Justice
- Sex: Stallion
- Foaled: 2005
- Country: Canada
- Colour: Gray
- Breeder: Adena Springs
- Owner: Adena Racing Venture II
- Trainer: Todd Pletcher
- Record: 10: 4-2-1
- Earnings: US $585,649

Major wins
- Withers Stakes (2008) Canadian Classic Race wins: Prince of Wales Stakes (2008)
- Last updated on January 5, 2010

Harlem Rocker (foaled April 25, 2005 in Ontario) is a Grade I winning Canadian thoroughbred racehorse.

== Background ==
He was owned by Adena Springs Racing Venture, a partnership headed by Frank Stronach. He was bred by Adena Springs at their Aurora, Ontario division. He is the son of Macho Uno who won the Breeders' Cup Juvenile in 2000. Harlem Rocker has been ridden exclusively by Jockey Eibar Coa and is trained by Todd Pletcher.

== Racing career ==
=== 2008: three-year-old season ===
Harlem Rocker's racing career began at Gulfstream Park where, after stumbling out of the gate, he rallied on the front stretch to win his maiden race. He then finished first in an allowance race, also at Gulfstream, in preparation for a start in the Grade III Withers Stakes. Harlem Rocker won the Withers on April 26, 2008, over a field of 3 other horses, including favorite J Be K. There was much speculation that Harlem Rocker would follow the path of Bernardini (2006 Preakness winner) and challenge Big Brown in the 2008 Preakness Stakes. However, owner Frank Stronach decided to direct the colt towards the Queen's Plate, the first of three races that make up the Canadian Triple Crown.

Harlem Rocker raced in the Plate Trial at Woodbine Racetrack, a prep race for the Queen's Plate. Going in as the betting favorite, he finished 4th on the synthetic surface known as polytrack. Todd Pletcher and Stronach then decided that Harlem Rocker was not suited to the artificial racing surface and that the Queen's Plate would not be in his best interest. After shipping back to Belmont Park to train with Todd Pletcher, Harlem Rocker returned to racing on dirt July 13, finishing first at the $500,000 Prince of Wales Stakes, the second leg of the Canadian Triple Crown.

Following his appearance in Canada, Harlem Rocker returned to the United States in August to appear at the 2008 Travers Stakes in Saratoga. Going up against one of the largest fields in recent history (12 horses), he finished 4th, beaten out by a nose for 3rd place by Pyro. He next raced in November in the Cigar Mile at Aqueduct Raceway, the same track where he won the Withers Stakes in April. Harlem Rocker faced a field of nine other horses and battled down the front stretch against Tale of Ekati. Harlem Rocker crossed the wire first in a photo finish but was disqualified to second place due to interference with Tale of Ekati. The stewards deemed that Harlem Rocker's move to the inside rail impacted Tale of Ekati's race.

Following the finish of the 2008 racing season, Harlem Rocker experienced abdominal discomfort and was sent for treatment at the Equine Medical Center of Ocala.

=== Later career ===
He was scheduled to be returned to training in July, but a respiratory ailment was spotted, and he underwent a "tie-back" surgery, or laryngeal hemiplegia to correct the issue.

Harlem Rocker made his return to racing as a 4 year old in November at Churchill Downs where he finished second in an Allowance Race. Harlem Rocker has made his first start as a 5 year old facing Quality Road at Gulfstream Park in the Hal's Hope Grade 3 Stakes Race. He finished in 4th place after being bumped at the start.

== Race record ==
| Date | Race | Track | Location | Distance | Surface | Purse | Finish |
|---|---|---|---|---|---|---|---|
| February 14, 2008 | Maiden Special Weight | Gulfstream Park | Hallandale Beach, Florida | 7/8 mi (7.0 furlongs; 1.4 km) | Dirt | $40,000 | 1st |
| March 30, 2008 | Allowance | Gulfstream Park | Hallandale Beach, Florida | 1 mi (8.0 furlongs; 1.6 km) | Dirt | $42,500 | 1st |
| April 26, 2008 | Withers Stakes | Aqueduct Racetrack | New York City, New York | 1 mi (8.0 furlongs; 1.6 km) | Dirt | $142,500 | 1st |
| June 1, 2008 | Plate Trial Stakes | Woodbine Racetrack | Toronto, Ontario | 1 1/8 mi (9.0 furlongs; 1.8 km) | Polytrack | $151,781 | 4th |
| July 13, 2008 | Prince of Wales Stakes | Fort Erie Racetrack | Fort Erie, Ontario | 1 1/16 mi (8.5 furlongs; 1.7 km) | Dirt | $495,400 | 1st |
| August 23, 2008 | Travers Stakes | Saratoga Race Course | Saratoga Springs, New York | 1 1/4 mi (10 furlongs; 2.0 km) | Dirt | $1,000,000 | 4th |
| October 5, 2008 | Jerome Handicap | Belmont Park | Elmont, New York | 1 mi (8.0 furlongs; 1.6 km) | Dirt | $150,000 | 3rd |
| November 29, 2008 | Cigar Mile Handicap | Aqueduct Racetrack | New York City, New York | 1 mi (8.0 furlongs; 1.6 km) | Dirt | $300,000 | 2nd |
| November 14, 2009 | Allowance Optional Claiming | Churchill Downs | Louisville, Kentucky | 7/8 mi (7.0 furlongs; 1.4 km) | Dirt | $56,000 | 2nd |
| January 3, 2010 | Hal's Hope Handicap | Gulfstream Park | Hallandale Beach, Florida | 1 mi (8.0 furlongs; 1.6 km) | Dirt | $100,000 | 4th |

== Pedigree ==
Pedigree of Harlem Rocker
| Sire Macho Uno | Holy Bull | Great Above | Minnesota Mac |
| Sire Macho Uno | Holy Bull | Great Above | Ta Wee |
| Sire Macho Uno | Holy Bull | Sharon Brown | Al Hattab |
| Sire Macho Uno | Holy Bull | Sharon Brown | Agathea's Dawn |
| Sire Macho Uno | Primal Force | Blushing Groom | Red God |
| Sire Macho Uno | Primal Force | Blushing Groom | Runaway Bride |
| Sire Macho Uno | Primal Force | Prime Prospect | Mr Prospector* |
| Sire Macho Uno | Primal Force | Prime Prospect | Square Generation |
| Dam Freedom Come | Lit de Justice | El Gran Senor | Northern Dancer |
| Dam Freedom Come | Lit de Justice | El Gran Senor | Sex Appeal |
| Dam Freedom Come | Lit de Justice | Kanmary | Kenmare |
| Dam Freedom Come | Lit de Justice | Kanmary | Djallybrook |
| Dam Freedom Come | Zee Lady | Unreal Zeal | Mr Prospector |
| Dam Freedom Come | Zee Lady | Unreal Zeal | Quick Nurse |
| Dam Freedom Come | Zee Lady | Try To Be A Lady | Sham |
| Dam Freedom Come | Zee Lady | Try To Be A Lady | Eight Lady |

* Harlem Rocker is inbred 4S x 4D to the stallion Mr Prospector, meaning that he appears fourth generation on the sire side of his pedigree, and fourth generation on the dam side of his pedigree.
