= Salerno (horse) =

American-bred Thoroughbred racehorse

- Sire: Sir Ribot
- Grandsire: Ribot
- Dam: Winsome Woman
- Damsire: Blandisher
- Sex: Stallion
- Foaled: 1965
- Country: United States
- Colour: Bay
- Breeder: Snowden-Doherty
- Owner: James P. Mills
- Trainer: William H. Turner, Jr.
- Record: 33: 8-3-8
- Earnings: US$103,149

Major wins
- Remsen Stakes (1967)
- Last updated on April 22, 2010

Salerno (foaled 1965 in Kentucky) was an American Thoroughbred racehorse who compiled a record of 8-3-8 in 33 career starts and retired in 1969 with earnings of $103,149. He was owned by Alice and James P. Mills and trained by William H. Turner, Jr. who went on to train the 1977 U.S. Triple Crown winner, Seattle Slew.

A grandson of Ribot, among Salerno's most important successes came as a two-year-old when he won the 1967 Remsen Stakes. The following year, he had a second-place finish in the Withers Stakes.

Salerno was retired to his owner's Hickory Tree Farm in Middleburg, Virginia.
