= Andrea Seefeldt =

American racing jockey (born 1963)

Andrea Jean Seefeldt Knight (born May 31, 1963) is a retired American thoroughbred racing jockey who first competed between 1981 and 1994. At graded stakes races, she won two Grade II events and one Grade III event. In Triple Crown races, Seefeldt was sixteenth at the 1991 Kentucky Derby and seventh at the 1994 Preakness Stakes. She became "the third woman to ever ride in the Derby" and "the second female jockey in the Preakness". Seefeldt Knight competed in a few races in the early 2010s before she stopped racing in 2014. She accumulated 605 wins and over $7 million in prize winnings.

Apart from racing, Seefeldt held administrative positions for Trump Plaza Hotel and Casino in the late 1980s. She started her sporting clays shooting career in 2010. Seefeldt Knight won silver at the 2019 World English Sporting Championship held by the International Clay Target Shooting Federation. She was a First Team All-America selection for the National Sporting Clays Association and Fédération Internationale de Tir aux Armes Sportives de Chasse. Seefeldt Knight joined the Anne Arundel County Sports Hall of Fame in 2002.

== Early life ==
Seefeldt was born in Elmhurst, Illinois on May 31, 1963. She grew up with show horses and her sibling. As a child, "Seefeldt ... lived in Florida before settling in Maryland".

== Career ==
=== Horse racing ===
In 1981, Seefeldt started her thoroughbred racing career. She became a race winner that year for Delaware Park Racetrack. Seefeldt competed in Laurel Race Course and Penn National Race Course events as an apprentice jockey during 1982. She was first at that year's Female Jockey Championship held at Fort Erie Race Track.

She experienced a vertebral compression fracture during 1984 and a pelvic fracture during 1988. Seefeldt underwent physical therapy for her pelvis. She stopped racing for several months after each injury. Seefeldt started working as a jockey agent in 1989 while continuing to race. Her inactivity continued after both a 1990 kidney injury and 1991 clavicle fracture.

Seefeldt competed at the International Queen Jockey Series in 1991. She temporarily paused her racing career in 1993 for her honeymoon. During this time period, Seefeldt won the 1991 Pennsylvania Derby and 1992 Cotillion Handicap as a Grade II jockey. Her final graded stakes race victory was at the Grade III Martha Washington Stakes during 1993.

As part of the Triple Crown, Seefeldt filled in for Mark Johnston at the 1991 Kentucky Derby. After she was sixteenth at the event, she became "the third woman to ever ride in the Derby". Seefeldt expanded her Triple Crown experience by competing at the 1994 Preakness Stakes. She was seventh at the event and was "the second female jockey in the Preakness".

Seefeldt started a sabbatical during 1995. She became interested in racing during 2010. Seefeldt Knight entered a few races in the early 2010s before she stopped racing again in 2014. After her career ended, Seefeldt had 605 wins and accumulated over $7 million in prize winnings.

=== Additional positions ===
Seefeldt was a clerk-typist and secretary for Trump Plaza Hotel and Casino in the late 1980s. She became a sporting clays shooter during 2010. Seefeldt Knight competed at the 2013 North America Cup Sporting held by the Fédération Internationale de Tir aux Armes Sportives de Chasse. As an International Clay Target Shooting Federation competitor, Seefeldt won silver in the Lady division during the 2019 World English Sporting Championship. Seefeldt Knight planned a "Delmarva chapter of ... Girls Really Into Shooting" in 2015 as a co-creator.

== Honors and personal life ==
Seefeldt Knight was selected as an All-America First Team selection for the FITSAC in 2019. This occurred after she finished sixth in points at 12-Gauge events. As a National Sporting Clays Association competitor, Seedfelt Knight received All-America First Team selections in 2021 and 2022. She finished fourth in points at 28-Gauge events during both years.

She joined the Anne Arundel County Sports Hall of Fame in 2002. During the late 1980s, Seefeldt was in a marriage and had a divorce. She started a marriage during 1992.
