= 1994 Preakness Stakes =

119th running of the Preakness Stakes

119th Preakness Stakes
- The Preakness Stakes
- Location: Pimlico Race Course, Baltimore, Maryland, United States
- Date: May 21, 1994
- Winning horse: Tabasco Cat
- Jockey: Pat Day
- Trainer: D. Wayne Lukas
- Conditions: Fast
- Surface: Dirt

The 1994 Preakness Stakes was the 119th running of the Preakness Stakes thoroughbred horse race. The race took place on May 21, 1994, and was televised in the United States on the ABC television network. Tabasco Cat, who was jockeyed by Pat Day, won the race by three quarters of a lengths over runner-up Go For Gin. Approximate post time was 5:32 p.m. Eastern Time. The race was run over a fast track in a final time of 1:56-2/5. The Maryland Jockey Club reported total attendance of 99,834, this is recorded as second highest on the list of American thoroughbred racing top attended events for North America in 1994.

== Payout ==
The 119th Preakness Stakes Payout Schedule

Program Number	Horse Name	Win	Place	Show
2	Tabasco Cat	$9.20	$4.60	$4.60
3	Go For Gin	-	$4.60	$4.40
1	Concern	-	-	$6.40

$2 Exacta: (2–3) paid $34.20

$2 Trifecta: (2–3–1) paid $160.40

== The full chart ==
Finish Position	Margin (lengths)	Post Position	Horse name	Jockey	Trainer	Owner	Post Time Odds	Purse Earnings
1st	0	1	Tabasco Cat	Pat Day	D. Wayne Lukas	Overbrook Farms	3.60-1	$325,000
2nd	3/4	2	Go For Gin	Chris McCarron	Nick Zito	William J. Condren, Joseph M. Cornacchia	2.80-1 favorite	$100,000
3rd	6 3/4	3	Concern	Garrett Gomez	Richard W. Small	Robert E. Meyerhoff	10.20-1	$500,000
4th	7 1/4	7	Kandaly	Craig Perret	Louie J. Roussel III	Cole, Lamarque, Roussel	11.80-1	$25,000
5th	9	10	Numerous	Pat Valenzuela	Charles Whittingham	Howard B. Keck	9.10-1	
6th	10 1/2	6	Blummin Affair	Jerry Bailey	Jack Van Berg	Leroy Bowman	3.10-1	
7th	12 1/2	9	Looming	Andrea J. Seefeldt	Richard W. Small	Robert E. Meyerhoff	10.20-1	
8th	13 1/2	4	Silver Goblin	Dale W. Cordova	Kenny P. Smith	Al J. Horton	9.90-1	
9th	14	5	Powis Castle	Brent E. Bartram	Rodney Rash	Vistas Stables	11.30-1	
10th	25	8	Polar Expedition	Curt Bourque	Hugh H. Robertson	James B. Cody	18.10-1	

- Winning Breeder: Overbrook Farms & David P. Reynolds; (KY)
- Final Time: 1:56 2/5
- Track Condition: Fast
- Total Attendance: 99,834

== See also ==
- 1994 Kentucky Derby
