= Mucho Gusto (horse) =

American thoroughbred racehorse

- Sire: Mucho Macho Man
- Grandsire: Macho Uno
- Dam: Itsagiantcauseway
- Damsire: Giant's Causeway
- Sex: Stallion
- Foaled: 2016
- Country: United States
- Breeder: Teneri Farm Inc. & Bernardo Alvarez Calderon
- Owner: Faisal bin Khalid
- Trainer: Bob Baffert
- Record: 11:6-2-2
- Earnings: $2,441,800

Major wins
- Bob Hope Stakes (2018); Affirmed Stakes (2019); Lazaro Barrera Memorial Stakes (2019); Robert B. Lewis Stakes (2019); Pegasus World Cup (2020)
- Last updated on January 16, 2021

Mucho Gusto (foaled April 26, 2016) is an American Thoroughbred racehorse who won the 2020 Pegasus World Cup.

== Racing career ==
Mucho Gusto's first race was on September 20, 2018, at Los Alamitos Race Course where he came in first. His next race was the Grade 3 Bob Hope Stakes, on November 17, 2018, where he also came in first. He finished his 2018 season with a second-place finish at the Grade 1 Los Alamitos Futurity.

Mucho Gusto began his 2019 season on February 2 with a win in the Grade 3 Robert B. Lewis Stakes. On May 18, he picked up a win at the Grade 3 Lazaro Barrera Memorial Stakes. He then picked up another win the month after by winning the Affirmed Stakes. On July 20, he finished second in the Grade 1 Haskell Invitational, and on August 24, he finished third in the Grade 1 Travers Stakes. His final race of the season was a fourth-place finish in the September 29 Oklahoma Derby.

He began his 2020 season with the biggest win of his career by winning his first Grade 1 race, the Pegasus World Cup. His next start was the $20 million Saudi Cup, where he finished third. He didn't record any workouts until October at Los Alamitos Race Course where he ran a leisurely 3 furlongs.

In the 2020 World's Best Racehorse Rankings, Mucho Gusto was rated on 118, making him the equal 80th best racehorse in the world.

San Antonio (G2) at Santa Anita Park on December 26 turned out to be his last race, where he finished fourth. In early January 2021, published reports stated that Mucho Gusto had been retired due to a soft tissue injury.

== Pedigree ==
Pedigree of Mucho Gusto (USA), 2016
Sire Mucho Macho Man (USA) 2008	Macho Uno (USA); 1998	Holy Bull	Great Above
Sire Mucho Macho Man (USA) 2008	Macho Uno (USA); 1998	Holy Bull	Sharon Brown
Sire Mucho Macho Man (USA) 2008	Macho Uno (USA); 1998	Primal Force	Blushing Groom*
Sire Mucho Macho Man (USA) 2008	Macho Uno (USA); 1998	Primal Force	Prime Prospect*
Sire Mucho Macho Man (USA) 2008	Ponche de Leona (USA); 1999	Ponche	Two Punch*
Sire Mucho Macho Man (USA) 2008	Ponche de Leona (USA); 1999	Ponche	Street Ballet
Sire Mucho Macho Man (USA) 2008	Ponche de Leona (USA); 1999	Perfect And Proud	Nonparrell
Sire Mucho Macho Man (USA) 2008	Ponche de Leona (USA); 1999	Perfect And Proud	Proud Sal
Dam Itsagiantcauseway (USA) 2007	Giant's Causeway (USA); 1997	Storm Cat	Storm Bird
Dam Itsagiantcauseway (USA) 2007	Giant's Causeway (USA); 1997	Storm Cat	Terlingua
Dam Itsagiantcauseway (USA) 2007	Giant's Causeway (USA); 1997	Mariah's Storm	Rahy*
Dam Itsagiantcauseway (USA) 2007	Giant's Causeway (USA); 1997	Mariah's Storm	Immense
Dam Itsagiantcauseway (USA) 2007	Countervail (USA); 2001	Seeking the Gold	Mr Prospector*
Dam Itsagiantcauseway (USA) 2007	Countervail (USA); 2001	Seeking the Gold	Con Game
Dam Itsagiantcauseway (USA) 2007	Countervail (USA); 2001	Strike A Balance	Green Dancer
Dam Itsagiantcauseway (USA) 2007	Countervail (USA); 2001	Strike A Balance	Strike a Pose (family: A29)

* Mucho Gusto is inbred 5S x 5S x 4D to the stallion Mr Prospector, meaning that he appears fifth generation twice (via Prime Prospect and Two Punch) on the sire side of his pedigree, and fourth generation once on the dam side of his pedigree.

* Mucho Gusto is inbred 4S x 5D to the stallion Blushing Groom, meaning that he appears fourth generation on the sire side of his pedigree, and fifth generation (via Rahy) on the dam side of his pedigree.
