= Macho Uno =

American Thoroughbred racehorse

- Sire: Holy Bull
- Grandsire: Great Above
- Dam: Primal Force
- Damsire: Blushing Groom
- Sex: Stallion
- Foaled: April 24th, 1998
- Died: August 30th, 2024 (Aged 26); Adena Springs South, Williston, Florida
- Country: United States
- Colour: Gray
- Breeder: Adena Springs
- Owner: Stronach Stables
- Trainer: Joe Orseno
- Record: 14: 6–1–3
- Earnings: $1,851,803

Major wins
- Grey Breeders' Cup Stakes (2000); Pennsylvania Derby (2001); Massachusetts Handicap (2002) Breeders' Cup wins: Breeders' Cup Juvenile (2000)

Awards
- U.S. Champion 2-Yr-Old Colt (2000)
- Last updated on September 3, 2007

Macho Uno (foaled April 24, 1998 in Kentucky) was an American Thoroughbred racehorse. He was sired by the 1994 American Horse of the Year and U.S. Racing Hall of Fame inductee, Holy Bull.

Trained by Joe Orseno, Macho Uno is best known for narrowly winning the 2000 Breeders' Cup Juvenile over future three-year-old champion Point Given and being voted the Eclipse Award as the American Champion Two-Year-Old Colt.

His three-year-old campaign was delayed until July resulting in limited starts though he did capture the Pennsylvania Derby and finish a creditable fourth to Tiznow in the Breeders' Cup Classic. At four he won an allowance race and the grade ii Massachusetts Handicap before closing out his career with a fifth-place finish in the 2002 Breeders Cup Classic behind Volponi.

Retired to stud duty, Macho Uno stood at his owner's Adena Springs South in Ocala, Florida. He is the sire of graded stakes winners Harlem Rocker, Macho Again, Mucho Macho Man, and Wicked Style. He was pensioned in 2020.

In August 2024, Adena Springs South reported that Macho Uno had been euthanized due to liver complications at the age of 26.

== Sire line tree ==
- Macho Uno
  - Harlem Rocker
  - Macho Again
  - Wicked Style
  - Mucho Macho Man
    - Mucho Gusto
  - Tolomeo
  - Macho Macho
    - Maenawy
  - Mucho Mas Macho
  - Private Zone
  - Danon Legend
  - Ovunque
  - Sib Macho Uno
  - VIP Zone
  - We'll Rock You
  - Whoopee Maker
  - Hy Riverside
  - Tommy Macho
  - Uno Mas Modelo
  - Bobby Abu Dhabi
