= Holy Bull =

American-bred Thoroughbred racehorse

- Sire: Great Above
- Grandsire: Minnesota Mac
- Dam: Sharon Brown
- Damsire: Al Hattab
- Sex: Stallion
- Foaled: January 24, 1991; Florida, US
- Died: June 7, 2017 (aged 26); Kentucky, US
- Country: United States
- Colour: Gray
- Breeder: Pelican Stable
- Owner: Rachel Carpenter; Warren A. Croll, Jr.
- Trainer: Warren A. Croll, Jr.
- Record: 16:13-0-0
- Earnings: $2,481,760

Major wins
- Belmont Futurity Stakes (1993); Hutcheson Stakes (1994); Florida Derby (1994); Blue Grass Stakes (1994); Metropolitan Handicap (1994); Dwyer Stakes (1994); Haskell Invitational Handicap (1994); Travers Stakes (1994); Woodward Stakes (1994); Olympic Handicap (1995)

Awards
- U.S. Champion 3-Yr-Old Colt (1994); U.S. Horse of the Year (1994)

Honours
- United States Racing Hall of Fame (2001) #64 - Top 100 U.S. Racehorses of the 20th Century; Holy Bull Stakes at Gulfstream Park

Holy Bull (January 24, 1991 – June 7, 2017) was a champion Thoroughbred racehorse. Although he finished a disappointing twelfth in the 1994 Kentucky Derby, his major wins that year in the Florida Derby, Blue Grass Stakes, Metropolitan Handicap, Haskell Invitational, Travers Stakes and Woodward Stakes earned him American Horse of the Year honors. He suffered a career-ending injury in the Donn Handicap soon after the beginning of his four-year-old campaign in 1995.

Subsequently, retired to stud, he was the sire of Kentucky Derby winner Giacomo and champion two-year-old Macho Uno.

Holy Bull was ranked #64 on the Blood-Horse magazine's list of the Top 100 U.S. racehorses of the 20th Century and was inducted into the National Museum of Racing and Hall of Fame in 2001.

== Background ==
Holy Bull was a gray stallion who was bred in Florida by Rachel Carpenter's Pelican Stables. When Carpenter died in 1993, she bequeathed her horses to her long-time trainer Warren A. Croll, Jr. Croll was previously best known as the trainer of the brilliant sprinter Mr. Prospector.

Holy Bull was sired by Great Above, whose dam was the U.S. Racing Hall of Fame filly Ta Wee. Unlike most modern sire lines, Great Above did not descend from either Nearco or Native Dancer but instead from the now rare line of Plaudit, the Kentucky Derby winner of 1898.

Holy Bull, nicknamed "The Bull", stood 16.1 hands (65 inches, 165 cm) high. He was known for his brilliant speed and was able to win from the front or off the pace. Daily Racing Form caricaturist Peb captured his somewhat split personality by portraying him as a raging bull with a halo above his head. On the one hand, Holy Bull was aggressive on the track and inclined to bite. On the other, he loved people, leading Croll to call him a ham. "Whenever he sees a photographer," said Croll, "he'll stop and pose. He's getting smarter by the day."

== Race history ==
=== 1993: two-year-old season ===
Holy Bull was unbeaten in his four races as a two-year-old, including the Grade I Belmont Futurity. He made his racing debut on August 14, 1993, in a maiden special weight race at Monmouth Park, displaying "super speed" despite racing greenly. In his next start on September 2 in an allowance race at Belmont Park, he led from start to finish, winning by seven lengths.

On September 18, he made his stakes debut in the Belmont Futurity, where he faced the previously undefeated Dehere, the eventual champion two-year-old colt of 1993. Over a muddy track, Holy Bull went to the early lead with Dehere tracking the pace in third place. As they entered the stretch, Dehere moved into second and started to close ground on Holy Bull but could not get past. Holy Bull hung on to win by half a length in a time of 1:23.31 for seven furlongs.

Holy Bull had not been nominated as a foal to the Breeders' Cup and his Croll declined to supplement at a cost of $120,000 to race in the Juvenile. Instead, Holy Bull finished his two-year-old season by winning the In Reality Stakes, part of the Florida Stallion series.

=== 1994: three-year-old season ===
At age three Holy Bull won eight out of ten starts, five of which were Grade I events. His average Beyer Speed Figure over the course of the year was 115.

He made his first start of 1994 in the Hutcheson Stakes at Gulfstream Park on January 20. He took the early lead but was passed in the stretch by Patton. Holy Bull then rallied and pulled away to win by three-quarters of a length. He suffered his first loss in the Fountain of Youth Stakes when he was caught in an early speed duel and tired, finishing last. The loss was blamed on Holy Bull getting excited and breathing through his mouth instead of his nose, thus not getting enough air. Croll subsequently fit him with a new nose band and bit to keep his mouth closed.

After his unexpectedly poor performance, Holy Bull was made the third betting choice in the Florida Derby in a field of fourteen that included favorite Go For Gin. Holy Bull took the early lead and set a solid early pace, then drew away in the stretch to win by nearly six lengths. His time of 1:47.96 for 1 1/8 miles was the fastest Florida Derby since Alydar in 1978 and earned him a "lofty" Beyer Speed Figure of 115. "This," said jockey Mike Smith, "was the real Holy Bull."

"The most exciting thing I ever saw was him alone on the lead Saturday," Croll said. "After the race, he cooled out in 15 minutes and was screaming for his dinner. He cleaned out every oat and the following morning was as bright as the sun."

In his next start on April 16, Holy Bull was the odds-on favorite in the Blue Grass Stakes. He went to the early lead and set a moderate pace, then responded to a brief challenge by pulling away under a hand ride. The win earned a Beyer of 113. After the race, Smith was confident in the colt's ability to go an extra furlong in the upcoming Kentucky Derby. "He would have gone around again today," he said. "I think he'll go as far as you want him. I'm not going to say no one can ever beat him, but when he runs his race, they've got to have their running shoes on. Every time I get on his back, I realize he's incredible."

Holy Bull was the favorite in the 1994 Kentucky Derby but after breaking poorly, he finished a distant 12th on a sloppy track. Croll later claimed that the horse must have been tampered with, as he had behaved in an uncharacteristically lethargic manner before the race. The purpose of the tampering, in this claim, was to knock out the odds-on favourite to create a dutch book. Holy Bull was treated for several days after the race with antibiotics against a possible infection and missed a few days of training.

Croll skipped the Preakness Stakes on May 21 and instead entered Holy Bull in the prestigious Metropolitan Handicap, popularly known as the Met Mile, against older horses on May 30. The field included 1993 Belmont Stakes winner Colonial Affair, multiple stakes winner Devil His Due, and Cherokee Run, who went on to be named the champion sprinter of 1994. Holy Bull quickly took the lead and drew off to win by 5 1/2 lengths, earning a Beyer Speed Figure of 122. "I still can't explain the Derby," said Smith. "But today he came out and showed what he is, like he always does – except for the first Saturday in May. He broke well and, every time I asked him to pick it up, he picked it up."

As the Belmont Stakes was held 12 days after the Met Mile, Croll bypassed it to focus on races later in the year. "The last thing I want to do is jeopardize his future," he said. Holy Bull returned in the Dwyer Stakes at Belmont Park on July 3, where he faced three rivals. Again, he went to the early lead, then pulled away in the stretch to win by 6 3/4 lengths. "He's an amazing horse," said Croll, who had shipped Holy Bull in from Monmouth Park on the day of the race. "This morning, getting on the van, he knew exactly where he was going. If I hadn't put him on the van, he'd have been disappointed."

He was next entered in the Haskell Invitational Handicap at Monmouth Park on July 31, in which he conceded at least eight pounds to each of his rivals. He again led from the start, then turned back a brief challenge by Meadow Flight down the stretch to win by 1 3/4 lengths. "I just tightened him up a little bit in the stretch and let him cruise on home," said Smith. "I felt no pressure at all."

Holy Bull's next start on August 20 was the Travers Stakes, held at the same 1 1/4-mile distance as the Kentucky Derby. The field of five included Preakness and Belmont Stakes winner Tabasco Cat and Arkansas Derby winner Concern, who later won the 1994 Breeders' Cup Classic. Trainer D. Wayne Lukas also entered Commanche Trail to act as a "rabbit" for stablemate Tabasco Cat, hoping to force Holy Bull into a speed duel and set the race up for Tabasco Cat to close in the stretch. As planned, Commanche Trail went straight to the lead, completing the first quarter-mile in :22 4/5 and the half-mile in :46 1/5. Holy Bull was right alongside and pulled into the lead down the backstretch, completing the first three-quarters in 1:10 3/5. In the long history of the Travers, only Man o' War had ever run a faster six furlongs and held on to win the race. Rounding the far turn, Holy Bull opened up a large lead but then Concern, at one point more than 20 lengths behind, started to close ground rapidly. As they neared the finish line, Concern looked the likely winner but Holy Bull refused to let him by, prevailing by a neck. Tabasco Cat finished 17 lengths behind in third; Commanche Trail finished last, "distanced" by the field.

"They thought he didn't have the breeding to go a mile and a quarter," said Croll. "They said he couldn't go around two turns. They thought he could win only on the lead. They had a rabbit up front and a closing horse chasing him at the end of a mile and a quarter. Well, he did what he had to do. He answered all the questions."

Holy Bull finished the season in the Woodward Stakes on September 17 against a field that included Grade I winners Devil His Due, Colonial Affair, Go For Gin, Tinners Way, and Bertrando. This time Holy Bull rated behind the early pace set by Bertrando, then drew off to win by five lengths. Smith said, "I'm in awe of him. I thought he grew wings at the quarter pole."

Holy Bull again skipped the Breeders’ Cup, in part because the supplemental fee to enter him in the Classic would have been $360,000. Croll also felt the colt needed a rest after a demanding season. "You could give me a half-million dollars tax-free and I wouldn't run him in the Breeders' Cup," he said. "This horse has been good for me and now it's time for me to be good to him."

Holy Bull was voted the Eclipse Award for Outstanding 3-Year-Old Male Horse and American Horse of the Year, earning 241 out of 245 votes for the latter award. The Daily Racing Form weighted Holy Bull at 130 lbs., most for a 3-year-old in 15 years (Spectacular Bid in 1979).

=== 1995: four-year-old season ===
As a four-year-old, Holy Bull won the Olympic Handicap easily but was pulled up during the Donn Handicap. Subsequent examinations showed a bowed tendon but no permanent injury. "If he wasn't Holy Bull, I'd bring him back to the races next year", said Croll. "I'm sorry we couldn't finish the year with him. He would have gone out in a blaze of glory. He has courage and class. I'm going to miss him. Everybody's going to miss him."

=== Statistics ===
Date	Age	Distance	Race	Grade	Track	Odds	Field	Finish	Winning Time	Winning (Losing) Margin	Jockey	Ref
Aug 14, 1993	2	5 1/2 furlongs	Maiden Special Weight	Maiden	Monmouth Park	*1.10	9	1	1:03.93	2 1/2 lengths	Luis Rivera Jr.	
Sep 2, 1993	2	6 1/2 furlongs	Allowance	Allowance	Belmont Park	*0.90	6	1	1:17.04	7 lengths	Mike Smith	
Sep 18, 1993	2	7 furlongs	Belmont Futurity	I	Belmont Park	3.10	6	1	1:23.31	1/2 lengths	Mike Smith	
Oct 23, 1993	2	1 1/16 miles	In Reality Stakes	black type	Calder Racetrack	*0.50	12	1	1:46.35	7 1/2 lengths	Mike Smith	
Jan 30, 1994	3	7 furlongs	Hutcheson Stakes	II	Gulfstream Park	*0.50	5	1	1:21.23	3/4 lengths	Mike Smith	
Feb 19, 1994	3	1 1/16 miles	Fountain of Youth Stakes	II	Gulfstream Park	*1.30	6	6	1:44.70	(24 1/4 lengths)	Mike Smith	
Mar 12, 1994	3	1 1/8 miles	Florida Derby	I	Gulfstream Park	2.70	14	1	1:47.96	5 3/4 lengths	Mike Smith	
Apr 16, 1994	3	1 1/8 miles	Blue Grass Stakes	II	Keeneland	*0.60	7	1	1:50.02	3 1/2 lengths	Mike Smith	
May 7, 1994	3	1 1/4 miles	Kentucky Derby	I	Churchill Downs	*2.20	14	12	2:03.72	(18 3/4 lengths)	Mike Smith	
May 30, 1994	3	1 mile	Metropolitan Handicap	I	Belmont	*1.00	10	1	1:33.98	5 1/2 lengths	Mike Smith	
Jul 3, 1994	3	1 1/16 miles	Dwyer Stakes	II	Belmont Park	*0.30	4	1	1:41.15	6 3/4 lengths	Mike Smith	
Jul 31, 1994	3	1 1/8 miles	Haskell Invitational	I	Monmouth Park	*0.20	6	1	1:48.36	1 3/4 lengths	Mike Smith	
Aug 21, 1994	3	1 1/4 miles	Travers Stakes	I	Saratoga	*0.80	5	1	2:02.03	neck	Mike Smith	
Sep 17, 1994	3	1 1/8 miles	Woodward Stakes	I	Belmont	*0.90	8	1	1:46.89	5 lengths	Mike Smith	
Jan 22, 1995	4	7 furlongs	Olympic Handicap	listed	Gulfstream Park	*0.40	6	1	1:22.04	2 1/2 lengths	Mike Smith	
Feb 11, 1995	4	1 1/8 miles	Donn Handicap	I	Gulfstream Park	*0.30	9	did not finish			Mike Smith	

== Retirement ==
Holy Bull was retired to stud at Jimmy Bell's Jonabell Farm, which was later sold to Darley Stud and became part of their North American operation. Despite his unfashionable pedigree, he was considered a "blue collar" success with 70% of his runners going on to win. Three years after the time of his retirement from stud in 2012, he had sired 51 stakes winners. His offspring include 2000 Breeders' Cup Juvenile winner and U.S. Champion 2-year-old male Macho Uno, 2005 Kentucky Derby winner Giacomo, 2007 Stephen Foster Handicap winner Flashy Bull, and graded stakes race winners Bwana Bull, Confessional, Bishop Court Hill, Woke Up Dreamin, Eishin Boone, and Sunny Ridge.

Holy Bull's chances of extending the Plaudit sire line depends mainly on Macho Uno, who has also proved a moderate success at stud. Macho Uno's descendants include Breeders' Cup Classic winner Mucho Macho Man.

Holy Bull also established himself as a successful broodmare sire. His daughters have produced over 50 stakes winners including Grade/Group One winners Judy the Beauty and Caravaggio.

In the Blood-Horse magazine List of the Top 100 Racehorses of the 20th Century, Holy Bull was ranked #64. In 2001, he was inducted in the National Museum of Racing and Hall of Fame.

Holy Bull was euthanized due to the infirmities of old age on June 7, 2017, at the age of 26.

== Sire line tree ==
- Holy Bull
  - Dream Chief
  - Macho Uno
    - Harlem Rocker
    - Macho Again
    - Wicked Style
    - Mucho Macho Man
      - Mucho Gusto
    - Tolomeo
    - Macho Macho
      - Maenawy
    - Mucho Mas Macho
    - Private Zone
    - Danon Legend
    - Ovunque
    - Sib Macho Uno
    - VIP Zone
    - We'll Rock You
    - Whoopee Maker
    - Hy Riverside
    - Tommy Macho
    - Uno Mas Modelo
    - Bobby Abu Dhabi
  - Bishop Court Hill
  - Eishin Boone
  - Woke Up Dreamin
  - Giacomo
    - Fancy Cruz
    - Germanico
    - Slim Pickins
    - Tiz Gianni
    - Giacom
    - Jomelo
    - King White
    - Tom Joy
    - Bet Your Life
    - Classic Giacnroll
    - El Kurdo
    - Hansboro
  - Flashy Bull
  - Bwana Bull
  - In Orario
  - Sunny Ridge

== Pedigree ==
Pedigree of Holy Bull, gray horse, January 24, 1991
Sire Great Above 1972	Minnesota Mac; 1964	Rough'n Tumble	Free For All
Sire Great Above 1972	Minnesota Mac; 1964	Rough'n Tumble	Roused
Sire Great Above 1972	Minnesota Mac; 1964	Cow Girl II	Mustang (GB)
Sire Great Above 1972	Minnesota Mac; 1964	Cow Girl II	Axe (GB)
Sire Great Above 1972	Ta Wee; 1966	Intentionally	Intent
Sire Great Above 1972	Ta Wee; 1966	Intentionally	My Recipe
Sire Great Above 1972	Ta Wee; 1966	Aspidistra	Better Self
Sire Great Above 1972	Ta Wee; 1966	Aspidistra	Tilly Rose
Dam Sharon Brown 1980	Al Hattab; 1966	The Axe II	Mahmoud* (GB)
Dam Sharon Brown 1980	Al Hattab; 1966	The Axe II	Blackball
Dam Sharon Brown 1980	Al Hattab; 1966	Abyssinia	Abernant (GB)
Dam Sharon Brown 1980	Al Hattab; 1966	Abyssinia	Serengeti (GB)
Dam Sharon Brown 1980	Agathea's Dawn; 1970	Grey Dawn II	Herbager
Dam Sharon Brown 1980	Agathea's Dawn; 1970	Grey Dawn II	Polamia*
Dam Sharon Brown 1980	Agathea's Dawn; 1970	Agathea	I Will
Dam Sharon Brown 1980	Agathea's Dawn; 1970	Agathea	Alxanth (family: 16-g)

* Holy Bull is inbred 4D x 5D to the stallion Mahmoud, meaning that he appears fourth generation and fifth generation (via Polamia) on the dam side of his pedigree.
