= Go for Gin =

American-bred Thoroughbred racehorse

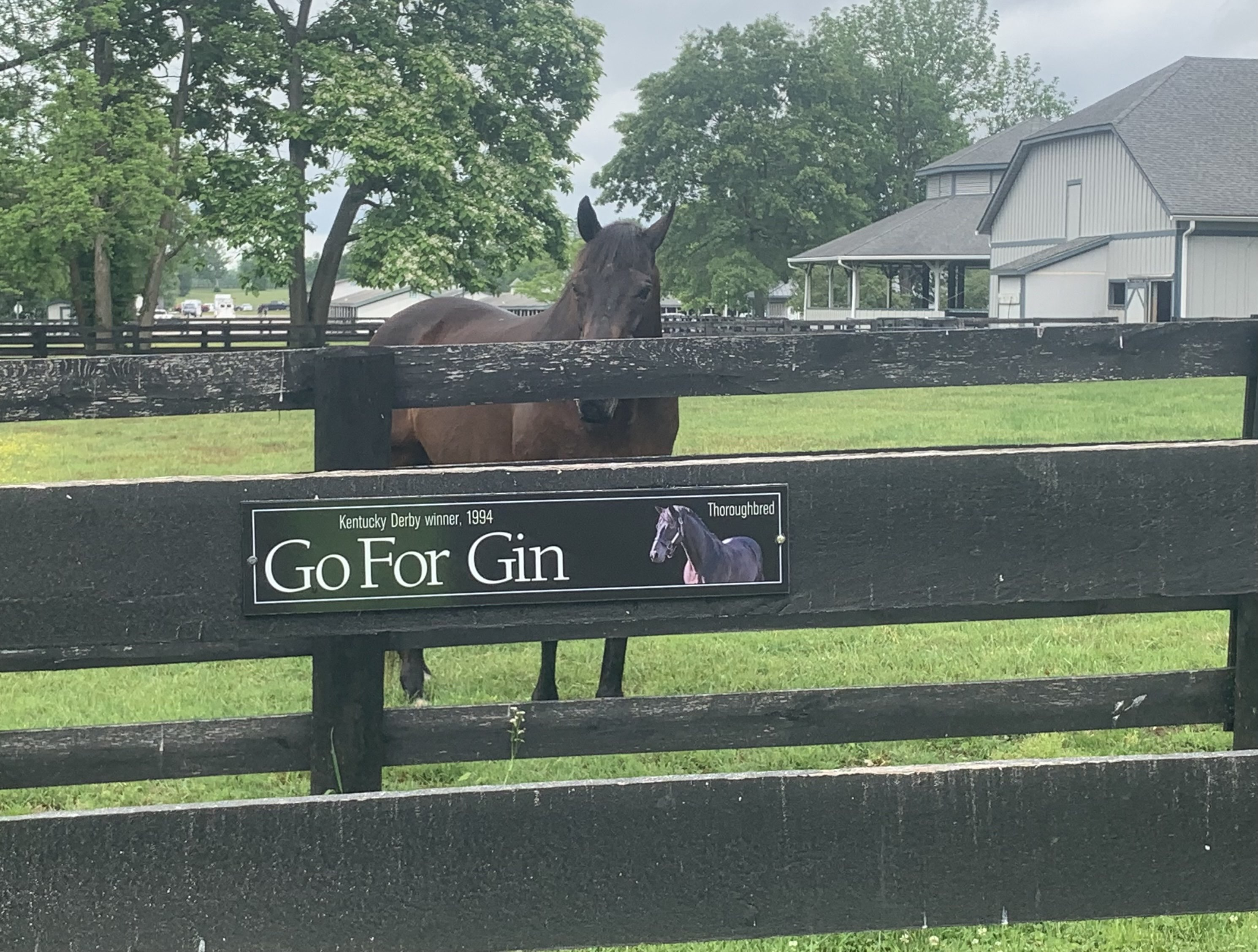
- Go For Gin at the Kentucky Horse Park (2021)
- Sire: Cormorant
- Grandsire: His Majesty
- Dam: Never Knock
- Damsire: Stage Door Johnny
- Sex: Stallion
- Foaled: April 18, 1991
- Died: March 8, 2022 (aged 30)
- Country: United States
- Colour: Bay
- Breeder: Pamela duPont Darmstadt
- Owner: William J. Condren & Joseph M. Cornacchia
- Trainer: Nicholas Zito
- Record: 19: 5-7-2
- Earnings: $1,380,866

Major wins
- Remsen Stakes (1993); Preview Stakes (1994) Triple Crown Race wins: Kentucky Derby (1994); Preakness Stakes 2nd (1994); Belmont Stakes 2nd (1994)
- Last updated on January 23, 2010

Go for Gin (April 18, 1991 – March 8, 2022) was an American thoroughbred racehorse best known as the winner of the 1994 Kentucky Derby. He was sired by Cormorant out of the dam Never Knock. He was ridden in the Derby by Chris McCarron, who had previously won the race on Alysheba.

Foaled in Kentucky in 1991, Go for Gin was bred by Pamela duPont Darmstadt and trained by Nick Zito, who also trained 1991 Kentucky Derby winner Strike the Gold.

In 1995, Go for Gin suffered a small tear of a tendon sheath in his left foreleg while working out at Belmont Park. This precipitated his retirement to stud.

After the death of Sea Hero in July 2019, Go for Gin became the oldest living Kentucky Derby winner. Upon the death of A.P. Indy on February 21, 2020, Go For Gin became the oldest living winner of any of the Triple Crown of Thoroughbred Racing races. This title now belongs to Silver Charm, the winner of the 1997 Kentucky Derby and Preakness.

== Racing history ==
Go for Gin started 19 races, winning five and running in the money 14 times. Though he challenged for the Triple Crown of Thoroughbred Racing, he never won again, losing his last nine races.

=== 1994 Kentucky Derby ===
The 120th Kentucky Derby was held on May 7, 1994, over a sloppy track. The race went off at 5:34 p.m. local time. Go for Gin entered the race at 9.10:1 odds, behind Holy Bull at 2.20, Brocco at 4.30, Tabasco Cat at 6.10, and Strodes Creek at 7.90. He started by ducking out, forcing Tabasco Cat into Brocco. By the 1/4 mile pole, Go for Gin moved up to second place behind Ulises. At the 1/2 mile pole, he led by half a length. As he entered the stretch, he increased the lead to four lengths. Strodes Creek and Blumin Affair both made late charges, closing the gap, but Go for Gin won by two lengths in a time of 2:03.72 and netted US$628,800 for the victory. Tabasco Cat finished sixth in this race but won that year's other two legs of the Triple Crown. Go for Gin placed second in both of those races.

=== Race record at age 2 ===
- Won Remsen Stakes
- Won Maiden
- Won Chief's Crown Stakes

=== Race record at age 3 ===
- Won Preview Stakes
- Won Kentucky Derby
- 2nd at Preakness Stakes
- 2nd at Belmont Stakes
- 2nd at Fountain of Youth Stakes
- 2nd at Wood Memorial Stakes
- 3rd at Forego Stakes

=== Race record at age 4 ===
- 3rd at Churchill Downs Handicap

=== Statistics ===
Date	Age	Distance	Surface (Condition)	Race	Grade	Track	Odds	Field	Finish	Winning Time	Winning (Losing) Margin	Jockey	Ref
Sep 13, 1993	2	6 furlongs	Dirt (Fast)	Maiden Special Weight	Maiden	Belmont Park	22.90	11	5	1:11.14	(14 1/4 lengths)	Jorge Chavez	
Oct 3, 1993	2	1 mile	Dirt (Muddy)	Maiden Special Weight	Maiden	Belmont Park	1.90	5	2	1:37.53	(1 3/4 lengths)	Jerry Bailey	
Oct 21, 1993	2	1 mile	Dirt (Sloppy)	Maiden Special Weight	Maiden	Aqueduct Racetrack	*0.90	7	1	1:35.52	10 1/2 lengths	Jerry Bailey	
Nov 6, 1993	2	1 mile	Dirt (Sloppy)	Chief's Crown Stakes	listed	Aqueduct Racetrack	*0.40	4	1	1:37.09	9 3/4 lengths	Jean-Luc Samyn	
Nov 27, 1993	2	1 1/8 miles	Dirt (Fast)	Remsen Stakes	II	Aqueduct Racetrack	*0.40	7	1	1:52.79	8 1/2 lengths	Jerry Bailey	
Jan 22, 1994	3	1 1/16 miles	Dirt (Fast)	Preview Stakes	listed	Gulfstream Park	*0.50	6	1	1:41.62	3 1/2 lengths	Jerry Bailey	
Feb 19, 1994	3	1 1/16 miles	Dirt (Good)	Fountain of Youth Stakes	II	Gulfstream Park	1.60	6	2	1:44.70	(3/4 lengths)	Jerry Bailey	
Mar 12, 1994	3	1 1/8 miles	Dirt (Fast)	Florida Derby	I	Gulfstream Park	*2.40	14	4	1:47.66	(6 3/4 lengths)	Jerry Bailey	
Apr 16, 1994	3	1 1/8 miles	Dirt (Good)	Wood Memorial Stakes	I	Aqueduct Racetrack	*0.90	9	2	1:49.07	(3 1/2 lengths)	Jerry Bailey	
May 7, 1994	3	1 1/4 miles	Dirt (Sloppy)	Kentucky Derby	I	Churchill Downs	9.10	14	1	2:03.72	2 lengths	Chris McCarron	
May 21, 1994	3	1 3/16 miles	Dirt (Fast)	Preakness Stakes	I	Pimlico Race Course	*2.80	10	2	1:56.47	(3/4 length)	Chris McCarron	
Jun 11, 1994	3	1 1/2 miles	Dirt (Fast)	Belmont Stakes	I	Belmont Park	1.50	6	2	2.26.82	(2 lengths)	Chris McCarron	
Aug 24, 1994	3	7 furlongs	Dirt (Fast)	Forego Stakes	II	Saratoga	1.80	7	3	1:22.74	(1 3/4 lengths)	Chris McCarron	
Sep 17, 1994	3	1 1/8 miles	Dirt (Fast)	Woodward Stakes	I	Belmont	7.00	8	4	1:46.89	(9 lengths)	Mike Smith	
Oct 8, 1994	3	1 1/4 miles	Dirt (Fast)	Jockey Club Gold Cup	I	Belmont Park	5.70	8	8	2:02.19	(14 3/4 lengths)	Chris McCarron	
Nov 5, 1994	3	1 1/4 miles	Dirt (Fast)	Breeders' Cup Classic	I	Churchill Downs	13.20	14	8	2.02.41	(12 lengths)	Laffit Pincay Jr.	
Mar 4, 1995	4	6 1/2 furlongs	Dirt (Fast)	Allowance	Allowance	Gulfstream Park	*1.30	5	2	1:16.80	(neck)	Jerry Bailey	
Apr 7, 1995	4	7 furlongs	Dirt (Fast)	Allowance	Allowance	Keeneland Race Course	*0.70	8	2	1:26.07	(1 1/2 lengths)	Chris Antley	
May 6, 1995	4	7 furlongs	Dirt (Fast)	Churchill Downs Handicap	III	Churchill Downs	3.80	11	3	1:21.75	(2 3/4 lengths)	Chris Antley	

== History at stud ==
Go for Gin was retired to stud in 1995 at Claiborne Farm in Kentucky. In 2004, he was sold to Bonita Farm in Darlington, Maryland. His stud feed as of 2007 was US$4000. He was the sire of Albert the Great, who retired with lifetime winnings in excess of US$3 million and has sired Nobiz Like Shobiz. His runners have earned an average US$71,742 per starter. He has sired seven stakes winners. In total, Go for Gin offspring have netted more than US$22 million in career winnings.

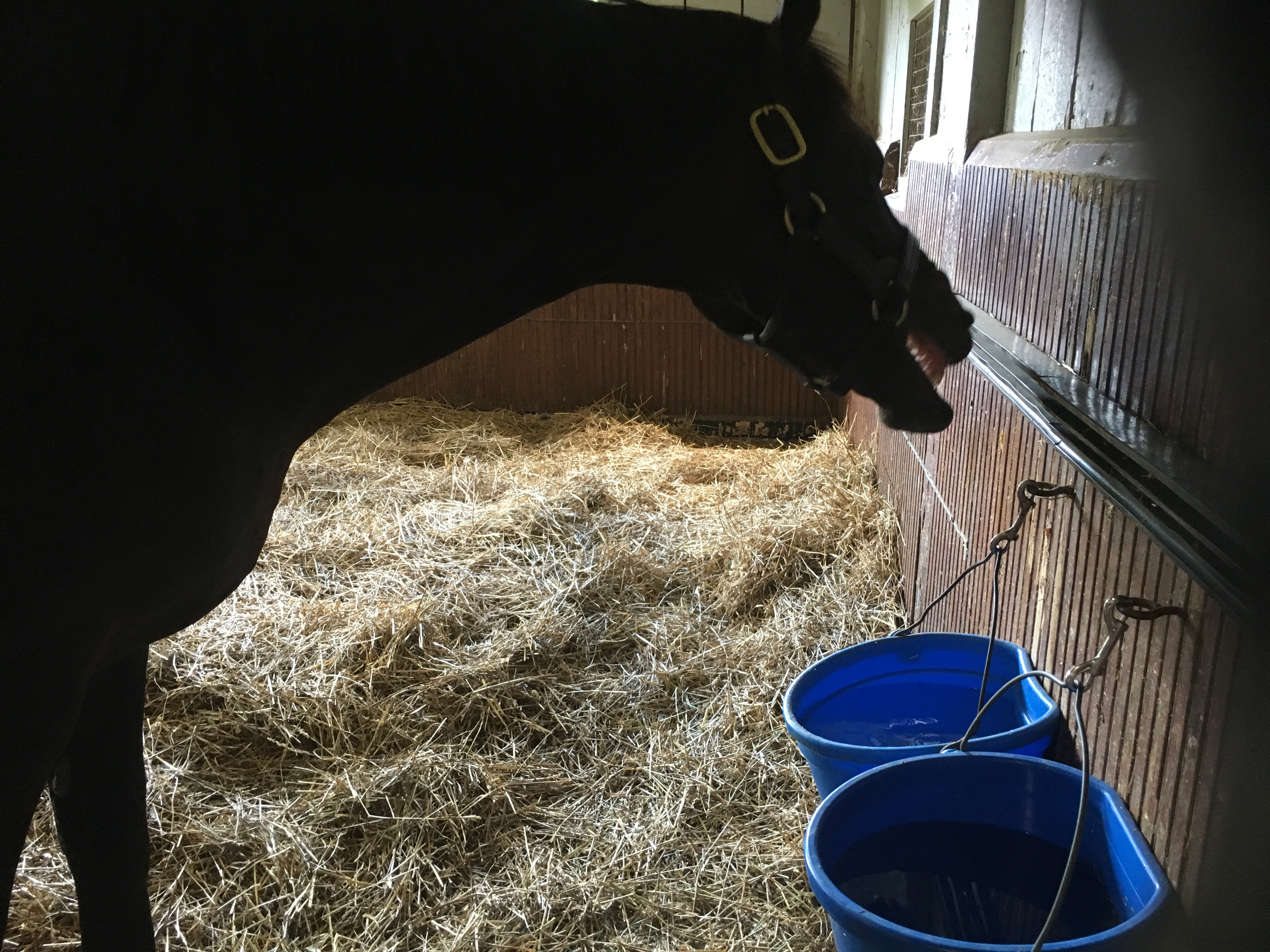
Go For Gin enjoying fresh hay.

== Post-retirement ==
On August 11, 2011, Go for Gin moved to the Kentucky Horse Park, an equine-themed park and industry showplace in Lexington, Kentucky. Along with Thoroughbred champions Funny Cide, Da Hoss, and Point Given, he greeted visitors to the Hall of Champions Go for Gin was the oldest living Kentucky Derby winner. He died from heart failure on March 8, 2022, at the age of 30.

== Sire line tree ==
- Go For Gin
  - Albert the Great
    - Albertus Maximus
    - Nobiz Like Shobiz
    - Moonshine Mullin
  - El Autentico

== Pedigree ==
Pedigree of Go for Gin
Sire Cormorant b. 1974	His Majesty b. 1968	Ribot b. 1952	Tenerani
Sire Cormorant b. 1974	His Majesty b. 1968	Ribot b. 1952	Romanella
Sire Cormorant b. 1974	His Majesty b. 1968	Flower Bowl b. 1952	Alibhai
Sire Cormorant b. 1974	His Majesty b. 1968	Flower Bowl b. 1952	Flower Bed
Sire Cormorant b. 1974	Song Sparrow b. 1967	Tudor Minstrel br. 1944	Owen Tudor
Sire Cormorant b. 1974	Song Sparrow b. 1967	Tudor Minstrel br. 1944	Sansonnet
Sire Cormorant b. 1974	Song Sparrow b. 1967	Swoons Tune b. 1962	Swoon's Son
Sire Cormorant b. 1974	Song Sparrow b. 1967	Swoons Tune b. 1962	Recess
Dam Never Knock dkb/br. 1979	Stage Door Johnny ch. 1965	Prince John ch. 1953	Princequillo
Dam Never Knock dkb/br. 1979	Stage Door Johnny ch. 1965	Prince John ch. 1953	Not Afraid
Dam Never Knock dkb/br. 1979	Stage Door Johnny ch. 1965	Peroxide Blonde ch. 1960	Ballymoss
Dam Never Knock dkb/br. 1979	Stage Door Johnny ch. 1965	Peroxide Blonde ch. 1960	Folie Douce
Dam Never Knock dkb/br. 1979	Never Hula br. 1969	Never Bend br. 1960	Nasrullah
Dam Never Knock dkb/br. 1979	Never Hula br. 1969	Never Bend br. 1960	Lalun
Dam Never Knock dkb/br. 1979	Never Hula br. 1969	Hula Hula br. 1952	Polynesian
Dam Never Knock dkb/br. 1979	Never Hula br. 1969	Hula Hula br. 1952	Black Helen
