= Holy Bull Stakes =

- Class: Grade III
- Location: Gulfstream Park; Hallandale Beach, Florida
- Inaugurated: 1990 (as Preview Stakes)
- Race type: Thoroughbred – Flat racing
- Website: www.gulfstreampark.com

Race information
- Distance: 1 1/16 miles
- Surface: Dirt
- Track: left-handed
- Qualification: Three-year-olds
- Weight: 124 lbs with allowances
- Purse: $275,000 (2026)

The Holy Bull Stakes is a Grade III American Thoroughbred horse race for three year old horses run over the distance of one and one-sixteenth miles on the dirt, held annually in January at Gulfstream Park, Hallandale Beach, Florida. The event currently carries a purse of $275,000.

== History ==
The event was inaugurated on 7 April 1990 as the Preview Stakes over a distance of 1 1/8 miles, and it was created as a replacement for the Flamingo Stakes that ceased to exist following the closure of Hialeah Park Race Track. The event was held three weeks after the Florida Derby and the winner Home At Last did not run in any of the Triple Crown Races.

In 1991 the distance was decreased to 1 1/16 miles and in 1992 the event was rescheduled to early February thus becoming a preparatory race for the Florida Derby.

In 1995 the Preview Stakes was upgraded to a Grade III. That same year Gulfstream Park scheduled an event in March in honor of U.S. Racing Hall of Fame horse Holy Bull who had won the Florida Derby in 1994.

The following year in 1996, Gulfstream Park replaced the Preview Stakes with the Holy Bull Stakes which assumed the classification of the event.

In 2008 the event was scheduled in April after the Florida Derby and run over a distance of 1 3/16 miles.

The event was upgraded to Grade II in 2014 and held this status until 2019. The event was degraded to Grade III for 2020.

The event has produced Classic winners. The 1994 winner Go for Gin won the Kentucky Derby. In 2006 Barbaro won the event for his fourth straight win continuing on to win the Florida Derby and the Kentucky Derby. In 2020 Tiz the Law also won the Florida Derby continuing on to win the Belmont Stakes when it was held in late June and was the first event in the Triple Crown series which was rescheduled due to COVID-19 pandemic.

The event is part of the Road to the Kentucky Derby with qualification points given to the first five placegetters.

== Records ==
Speed record:

- 1 1/16 miles – 1:41.62 Go for Gin (1994)
- 1 mile – 1:35.19 Dialed In (2011)
- 1 1/8 miles – 1:49.31 Barbaro (2006)

Margins:

- 8 lengths – Suave Prospect (1995)

Most wins by a trainer:

- 3 – Nick Zito (1994, 1995, 2011)
- 3 – Kiaran McLaughlin (2005, 2014, 2016)
- 3 – Todd A. Pletcher (2012, 2018, 2026)

Most wins by a jockey:

- 5 – Jerry D. Bailey (1990, 1993, 1994, 1995, 1998)

Most wins by an owner:

- 2 – William J. Condren (1994, 1995)
- 2 – Paul Braverman (2014, 2019)

== Winners ==
Year	Winner	Jockey	Trainer	Owner	Distance	Time	Purse	Grade	Ref
Holy Bull Stakes
2026	Nearly	John R. Velazquez	Todd A. Pletcher	Centennial Farms	1 1/16 miles	1:44.52	$267,500	III	
2025	Burnham Square	Edgard Zayas	Ian Wilkes	Whitham Thoroughbreds	1 1/16 miles	1:43.60	$250,000	III	
2024	Hades	Paco Lopez	Joseph Orseno	D. J. Stable & Robert Cotran	1 1/16 miles	1:46.07	$260,000	III	
2023	Rocket Can	Junior Alvarado	William I. Mott	Frank Fletcher Racing Operations	1 1/16 miles	1:44.97	$250,000	III	
2022	White Abarrio	Tyler Gaffalione	Saffie A. Joseph Jr.	C2 Racing Stable & La Milagrosa Stable	1 1/16 miles	1:42.80	$250,000	III	
2021	Greatest Honour	Jose L. Ortiz	Claude R. McGaughey III	Courtlandt Farms	1 1/16 miles	1:43.19	$200,000	III	
2020	Tiz the Law	Manuel Franco	Barclay Tagg	Sackatoga Stable	1 1/16 miles	1:42.04	$250,000	III	
2019	Harvey Wallbanger	Brian Hernandez Jr.	Kenneth G. McPeek	Harold Lerner, AWC Stables, Nehoc Stables, Scott Akman & Paul Braverman	1 1/16 miles	1:43.69	$350,000	II	
2018	Audible	Javier Castellano	Todd A. Pletcher	WinStar Farm, China Horse Club & SF Racing	1 1/16 miles	1.41.92	$350,000	II	
2017	Irish War Cry	Joel Rosario	H. Graham Motion	Isabelle de Tomaso	1 1/16 miles	1:42.52	$350,000	II	
2016	Mohaymen	Junior Alvarado	Kiaran P. McLaughlin	Shadwell Stables	1 1/16 miles	1:42.07	$350,000	II	
2015	Upstart	Jose L. Ortiz	Richard A. Violette Jr.	Ralph M. Evans	1 1/16 miles	1:43.61	$400,000	II	
2014	Cairo Prince	Luis Saez	Kiaran P. McLaughlin	Namcook Stables, Paul Braverman, Harvey A. Clarke & Craig W. Robertson III	1 1/16 miles	1:42.16	$400,000	II	
2013	Itsmyluckyday	Elvis Trujillo	Edward Plesa Jr.	Trilogy Stable & Laurie Plesa	1 1/16 miles	1:41.81	$400,000	III	
2012	Algorithms	Javier Castellano	Todd A. Pletcher	Starlight Racing	1 mile	1:36.17	$400,000	III	
2011	Dialed In	Julien R. Leparoux	Nicholas P. Zito	Robert V. LaPenta	1 mile	1:35.19	$400,000	III	
2010	Winslow Homer	Ramon A. Dominguez	Anthony W. Dutrow	Fox Hill Farms	1 mile	1:35.97	$150,000	III	
2009	Saratoga Sinner	Julien R. Leparoux	Eddie Kenneally	Lally Stable	1 1/8 miles	1:51.45	$150,000	III	
2008	Hey Byrn	Charles C. Lopez	Edward Plesa Jr.	Beatrice Oxenberg	1 3/16 miles	1:58.14	$150,000	III	
2007	Nobiz Like Shobiz	Cornelio Velasquez	Barclay Tagg	Elizabeth J. Valando	1 mile	1:35.47	$150,000	III	
2006	Barbaro	Edgar S. Prado	Michael R. Matz	Lael Stables	1 1/8 miles	1:49.31	$150,000	III	
2005	Closing Argument	Cornelio Velasquez	Kiaran P. McLaughlin	Philip & Marcia Cohen	1 1/8 miles	1:50.14	$150,000	III	
2004	Second of June	Cornelio Velasquez	William J. Cesare	Barbara Cesare	1 1/16 miles	1:43.00	$100,000	III	
2003	Offlee Wild	Mark Guidry	Thomas Victor Smith	Azalea Stables	1 1/16 miles	1:43.00	$100,000	III	
2002	Booklet	Eibar Coa	John T. Ward Jr.	John C. Oxley	1 1/16 miles	1:46.16	$100,000	III	
2001	Radical Riley	Eduardo O. Nunez	James Hatchett	Jacks or Better Farm	1 1/16 miles	1:46.06	$100,000	III	
2000	Hal's Hope	Roger I. Velez	Harold J. Rose	Harold J. Rose Trust	1 1/16 miles	1:44.52	$100,000	III	
1999	Grits'n Hard Toast	Robbie Davis	Thomas Victor Smith	Thomas Victor Smith & Robert A. Anderson	1 1/16 miles	1:45.32	$100,000	III	
1998	Cape Town	Jerry D. Bailey	D. Wayne Lukas	Overbrook Farm	1 1/16 miles	1:44.15	$100,000	III	
1997	Arthur L.	John R. Velazquez	Luis Olivares	Cobble View Stable	1 1/16 miles	1:42.93	$100,000	III	
1996	Cobra King	Chris McCarron	Mike Puype	Betty Biszantz	1 1/16 miles	1:43.42	$75,000	III	
1995	Royal Mitch	Robbie Davis	Dennis W. Ebert	Crown Stable	1 1/16 miles	1:44.03	$50,000		
Preview Stakes
1995	Suave Prospect	Jerry D. Bailey	Nicholas P. Zito	William J. Condren & Michael H. Sherman	1 1/16 miles	1:44.03	$75,000	III	
1994	Go for Gin	Jerry D. Bailey	Nicholas P. Zito	William J. Condren & Joseph Cornacchia	1 1/16 miles	1:41.62	$75,000	Listed	
1993	Pride of Burkaan	Jerry D. Bailey	Leo Azpurua Jr.	R. Johnson & G. Murchison	1 1/16 miles	1:44.74	$75,000	Listed	
1992	Waki Warrior	Earlie Fires	William G. Huffman	Stanley Lowenbraun	1 1/16 miles	1:44.32	$130,430	Listed	
1991	Shoot to Kill	Wigberto S. Ramos	Linda L. Rice	Clyde D. Rice	1 1/16 miles	1:43.54	$200,000	Listed	
1990	Home At Last	Jerry D. Bailey	Carl A. Nafzger	Russell L Reineman Stable	1 1/8 miles	1:53.20	$233,600		

== See also ==
List of American and Canadian Graded races
