= Remsen Stakes =

Annual horse race in Queens, New York

- Class: Grade II
- Location: Aqueduct Racetrack; Queens, New York, USA
- Inaugurated: 1904
- Race type: Thoroughbred – Flat racing
- Website: www.nyra.com/index_aqueduct.html

Race information
- Distance: 1 1/8 miles (9 furlongs)
- Surface: Dirt
- Track: left-handed
- Qualification: Two-year-olds
- Weight: Handicap
- Purse: $250,000

The Remsen Stakes is an American Grade II race for Thoroughbred horse race run annually near the end of November at Aqueduct Racetrack in Queens, New York. The one and one-eighths mile race is open to two-year-olds and currently offers a purse of $250,000.

Inaugurated in 1904, the Remsen was named for Colonel Joremus Remsen (1735–1790) whose family at one time owned a large portion of Long Island and who became leader of the American Revolutionary forces at the 1776 Battle of Long Island.

Run at Jamaica Race Course from inception in 1904 to 1959, it was run in two divisions in 1943 and until 1954 was known as the Remsen Handicap. There was no race held in 1908, and none from 1910 to 1917 as well as 1951.

The Remsen stakes is influential as one of the last graded stakes for two-year-olds on the New York racing circuit and its winner is generally among the winterbook favorites for the following year's Kentucky Derby.

== Records ==
- 1:47 4/5 – Believe It (1977) (at current 1 1/8 miles distance)
- 1:33 4/5 – Sum Up (1964) 2nd fastest 2yo dirt mile

Most wins by a jockey:

- 4 – Eddie Maple (1972, 1977, 1981, 1989)
- 4 – John R. Velazquez (2001, 2005, 2010, 2016)

Most wins by a trainer:

- 4 – Claude R. McGaughey III (1988, 1997, 2001, 2013)

Most wins by an owner:

- 2 – Belair Stud (1938, 1941)
- 2 – Brookmeade Stable (1940, 1944)
- 2 – Maine Chance Farm (1944, 1945)
- 2 – Allen T. Simmons (1943, 1948)
- 2 – Windfields Farm (1959, 1963)
- 2 – Rokeby Stable (1971, 1986)
- 2 – Fox Hill Farms, Inc. (2004, 2008)
- 2 – WinStar Farm (2005, 2007)
- 2 – West Paces Racing (2022, 2023)

== Winners ==
Year	Winner	Jockey	Trainer	Owner	Distance	Time	Win$
2025	Paladin	Flavien Prat	Chad C. Brown	Susan Magnier, Michael Tabor, Derrick Smith, Peter M. Brant, Brook T. Smith & Summer Wind Equine, LLC	11/8 M	1:50.97	$250,000
2024	Poster	Flavien Prat	Eoin G. Harty	Godolphin, LLC	11/8 M	1:50.37	$250,000
2023	Dornoch	Luis Saez	Danny Gargan	West Paces Racing, R. A. Hill Stable, Belmar Racing & Breeding, Two Eight Racing & Pine Racing Stables	11/8 M	1:50.30	$250,000
2022	Dubyuhnell	José Ortiz	Danny Gargan	West Paces Racing & Stonestreet Stables	11/8 M	1:50.88	$250,000
2021	Mo Donegal	Irad Ortiz Jr.	Todd A. Pletcher	Donegal Racing	11/8 M	1:53.61	$250,000
2020	Brooklyn Strong	Joel Rosario	Daniel Velazquez	Mark Schwartz	11/8 M	1:50.60	$82,500
2019	Shotski	Luis Saez	Jeremiah O'Dwyer	Gary Barber, Wachtel Stable (Adam Wachtel), Pantofel Stable (Len Schleifer), Mike Karty	11/8 M	1:54.24	$137,500
2018	Maximus Mischief	Frankie Pennington	Robert E. Reid Jr.	Cash Is King LLC (Chuck Zacney) & LC Racing (Glenn Bennett)	11/8 M	1:51.34	$137,500
2017	Catholic Boy	Manuel Franco	Jonathan Thomas	Robert V. LaPenta	11/8 M	1:52.50	$150,000
2016	Mo Town	John R. Velazquez	Anthony W. Dutrow	S. Magnier, M. Tabor, D. Smith, Team D	11/8 M	1:51.58	$180,000
2015	Mohaymen	Junior Alvarado	Kiaran McLaughlin	Shadwell Stable	11/8 M	1:50.69	$180,000
2014	Leave the Light On	José L. Ortiz	Chad C. Brown	Klaravich Stables, Inc. & William Lawrence	11/8 M	1:51.06	$240,000
2013	Honor Code	Javier Castellano	Claude R. McGaughey III	Lane's End Farm & Dell Ridge Racing LLC	11/8 M	1:52.92	$240,000
2012	Overanalyze	Ramon Domínguez	Todd A. Pletcher	Repole Stable	11/8 M	1:50.13	$150,000
2011	O'Prado Again	Kent Desormeaux	Dale Romans	Donegal Racing	11/8 M	1:52.07	$120,000
2010	To Honor and Serve	John R. Velazquez	William I. Mott	Live Oak Plantation	11/8 M	1:50.03	$120,000
2009	Buddy's Saint	Jose Lezcano	Bruce N. Levine	Kingfield Stables (Eli Lomita)	11/8 M	1:52.95	$120,000
2008	Old Fashioned	Ramon Domínguez	J. Larry Jones	Fox Hill Farms, Inc.	11/8 M	1:50.33	$120,000
2007	Court Vision	Eibar Coa	William I. Mott	WinStar Farm	11/8 M	1:52.48	$120,000
2006	Nobiz Like Shobiz	Cornelio Velásquez	Barclay Tagg	Elizabeth Valando	11/8 M	1:48.82	$120,000
2005	Bluegrass Cat	John Velazquez	Todd A. Pletcher	WinStar Farm	11/8 M	1:52.20	$120,000
2004	Rockport Harbor	Stewart Elliott	John Servis	Fox Hill Farms, Inc.	11/8 M	1:48.80	$120,000
2003	Read the Footnotes	Jerry Bailey	Richard A. Violette Jr.	Klaravich Stables, Inc.	11/8 M	1:50.60	$120,000
2002	Toccet	Jorge Chavez	John F. Scanlan	Dan Borislow	11/8 M	1:50.40	$120,000
2001	Saarland	John R. Velazquez	Claude R. McGaughey III	Cynthia Phipps	11/8 M	1:51.20	$120,000
2000	Windsor Castle	Robbie Davis	Frank A. Alexander	Frank A. Alexander	11/8 M	1:51.80	$120,000
1999	Greenwood Lake	Jean-Luc Samyn	Nick Zito	Dee Conway et al.	11/8 M	1:50.60	$120,000
1998	Comeonmom	Joe Bravo	Robert A. Barbara	Sabine Stable, LLC (Joseph & Winnie Greeley)	11/8 M	1:49.80	$120,000
1997	Coronado's Quest	Mike Smith	Claude R. McGaughey III	Stuart S. Janney III	11/8 M	1:52.20	$120,000
1996	The Silver Move	Richard Migliore	Linda L. Rice	Earl Silver	11/8 M	1:53.40	$120,000
1995	Tropicool	Jorge Chavez	John C. Kimmel	Kenneth Ellenberg	11/8 M	1:50.20	$170,000
1994	Thunder Gulch	Gary Stevens	D. Wayne Lukas	Michael Tabor	11/8 M	1:53.80	$120,000
1993	Go for Gin	Jerry Bailey	Nick Zito	William J. Condren	11/8 M	1:52.60	$120,000
1992	Silver of Silver	Jacinto Vásquez	Stanley R. Shapoff	Chevalier Stable (Joanne Shapoff, et al.)	11/8 M	1:50.20	$120,000
1991	Pine Bluff	Craig Perret	Thomas Bohannan	Loblolly Stable	11/8 M	1:50.80	$120,000
1990	Scan	Jerry Bailey	Flint S. Schulhofer	William Haggin Perry	11/8 M	1:52.40	$106,560
1989	Yonder	Eddie Maple	Woody Stephens	Claiborne Farm	11/8 M	1:51.20	$145,680
1988	Fast Play	Ángel Cordero Jr.	Claude R. McGaughey III	Ogden Phipps	11/8 M	1:50.60	$197,400
1987	Batty	Jose Santos	Suzanne H. Jenkins	Joseph Daniero	11/8 M	1:52.40	$176,400
1986	Java Gold	Pat Day	MacKenzie Miller	Rokeby Stable	11/8 M	1:49.60	$172,680
1985	Pillaster	Ángel Cordero Jr.	LeRoy Jolley	Peter M. Brant	11/8 M	1:49.00	$193,000
1984	Stone White *	Robbie Davis	Gilbert Puentes	Gilbert Puentes	11/8 M	1:53.20	$178,680
1983	Dr. Carter	Jorge Velásquez	John M. Veitch	Frances A. Genter	11/8 M	1:49.00	$134,700
1982	Pax In Bello	Jeffrey Fell	Steve Jerkens	Mrs. Arnold Willcox	11/8 M	1:50.20	$141,300
1981	Laser Light	Eddie Maple	Patrick J. Kelly	Live Oak Racing	11/8 M	1:50.80	$103,500
1980	Pleasant Colony *	Vincent Bracciale Jr.	P. O'Donnell Lee	Buckland Farm	11/8 M	1:50.20	$67,920
1979	Plugged Nickle	Buck Thornburg	Thomas J. Kelly	John M. Schiff	11/8 M	1:50.40	$64,560
1978	Instrument Landing	Jeffrey Fell	David A. Whiteley	Pen-Y-Bryn Farm	11/8 M	1:50.20	$48,375
1977	Believe It	Eddie Maple	Woody Stephens	Hickory Tree Stable	11/8 M	1:47.80	$48,375
1976	Royal Ski	Jack Kurtz	John J. Lenzini Jr.	Gerry Cheevers	11/8 M	1:50.40	$49,545
1975	Hang Ten	Laffit Pincay Jr.	Woody Stephens	Mill House Stable	11/8 M	1:49.20	$52,219
1974	El Pitirre	Mike Venezia	Lazaro S. Barrera	Enrique Ubarri	11/8 M	1:49.40	$34,380
1973	Heavy Mayonnaise	Chuck Baltazar	David Erb	William Trotter II	11/8 M	1:51.40	$17,925
1972	Kinsman Hope	Eddie Maple	John L. Cotter	Kinship Stable	1 M	1:37.00	$18,045
1971	Key To The Mint	Braulio Baeza	J. Elliott Burch	Rokeby Stable	1 M	1:36.60	$21,570
1970	Jim French	Ángel Cordero Jr.	John P. Campo	Frank Caldwell	1 M	1:36.80	$18,360
1969	Protanto	Jorge Velásquez	MacKenzie Miller	Cragwood Stables	1 M	1:35.60	$19,792
1968	Palauli	Larry Adams	Frank Y. Whiteley Jr.	Powhatan Stable	1 M	1:36.40	$18,980
1967	Salerno	Manuel Ycaza	William H. Turner Jr.	James P. Mills	1 M	1:38.00	$19,890
1966	Damascus	Bill Shoemaker	Frank Y. Whiteley Jr.	Edith W. Bancroft	1 M	1:37.00	$19,695
1965	Gary G.	Braulio Baeza	Rudolph L. Coyne	Harbor View Farm	1 M	1:36.00	$18,460
1964	Sum Up	Don Pierce	Edward A. Neloy	Elmendorf Farm	1 M	1:33.80	$18,428
1963	Northern Dancer	Manuel Ycaza	Horatio Luro	Windfields Farm	1 M	1:35.60	$18,330
1962	Rocky Link	John Rotz	Stephen A. DiMauro	Golden Triangle Stable	1 M	1:36.40	$19,305
1961	Figaro Bob	John Rotz	Eugene Jacobs	Alexander J. Ostriker	1 M	1:36.80	$19,240
1960	Carry Back	Johnny Sellers	Jack A. Price	Katherine Price	1 M	1:36.40	$22,822
1959	Victoria Park	Eric Guerin	Horatio Luro	Windfields Farm	1 M	1:37.20	$23,050
1958	Atoll	John Ruane	Raymond Metcalf	Elkcam Stable (Mackle brothers)	11/16 M	1:44.60	$18,322
1957	Misty Flight	Eddie Arcaro	James E. Fitzsimmons	Wheatley Stable	11/16 M	1:45.00	$20,100
1956	Ambehaving	Logan Batcheller	Dr. John Lee	Bohemia Stable	11/16 M	1:45.60	$64,975
1955	Nail	Hedley Woodhouse	George M. Odom	Josephine Widener Bigelow	11/16 M	1:45.20	$64,475
1954	Roman Patrol	Douglas Dodson	Joseph H. Pierce Jr.	Pin Oak Farm (James S. Abercrombie)	11/16 M	1:48.00	$37,250
1953	Galdar	Jimmy Nicols	Edward M. O'Brien	Edward M. O'Brien	11/16 M	1:46.60	$19,550
1952	Social Outcast *	Eric Guerin	William C. Winfrey	Alfred G. Vanderbilt	11/16 M	1:45.40	$19,600
1951	Race not held						
1950	Repetoire	Kenneth Church	Albert Jensen	Nora A. Mikell	6 F	1:11.40	$8,575
1949	Lights Up	Ovie Scurlock	Winbert F. Mulholland	George D. Widener Jr.	6 F	1:13.40	$8,875
1948	Eternal World	Ted Atkinson	Frank Catrone	Allen T. Simmons	5 F	1:00.60	$14,300
1947	Big If	Charles Givens	James W. Maloney	Mrs. J. T. Maloney	11/16 M	1:47.00	$17,450
1946	Phalanx	Ruperto Donoso	Sylvester Veitch	C. V. Whitney	11/16 M	1:45.80	$18,000
1945	Lord Boswell	Eric Guerin	Tom Smith	Maine Chance Farm	6 F	1:11.20	$8,595
1944	Great Power * (DH)	Eddie Arcaro	Preston M. Burch	Brookmeade Stable	6 F	1:12.40	$5,395
1944	War Jeep * (DH)	Albert Snider	Tom Smith	Maine Chance Farm	6 F	1:12.40	$5,395
1943-1	Bellwether	Johnny Longden	Joseph A. Kramer	Cain Hoy Stable	6 F	1:13.20	$7,912
1943-2	Black Badge	Wayne Wright	Frank E. Childs	Abraham Hirschberg	6 F	1:11.40	$8,112
1942	Blue Swords	Carroll Bierman	Walter A. Kelley	Allen T. Simmons	6 F	1:12.80	$8,250
1941	Apache	James Stout	James E. Fitzsimmons	Belair Stud	6 F	1:12.80	$8,950
1940	Harvard Square * (DH)	Buddy Haas	Max Hirsch	W. Arnold Hanger	6 F	1:11.20	$6,425
1940	Mettlesome * (DH)	Alfred Robertson	Hugh L. Fontaine	Brookmeade Stable	6 F	1:11.20	$6,425
1939	Camp Verde	Don Meade	Lewis T. Whitehill	T. P. Morgan	6 F	1:11.80	$6,600
1938	Johnstown	James Stout	James E. Fitzsimmons	Belair Stud	6 F	1:11.00	$7,100
1937	Bourbon King	Charles Kurtsinger	Duval A. Headley	Hal Price Headley	6 F	1:12.40	$7,500
1936	Clodion	John Gilbert	Walter A. Carter	Walter A. Carter	6 F	1:12.60	$3,065
1935	The Fighter	Eddie Arcaro	Robert McGarvey	Milky Way Farm Stable	6 F	1:12.00	$3,885
1934	Esposa	Earl Porter	John F. Schorr	Middleburg Stable	6 F	1:13.40	$3,660
1933	Sgt. Byrne	Alfred Robertson	James Ritchie	John Simonetti	6 F	1:12.60	$1,690
1932	Quel Jeu	Jack Long	George M. Odom	Arden Farm	6 F	1:11.80	$1,425
1931	Cambal	Eddie Ambrose	John J. Hastings	Mrs. George U. Harris	6 F	1:13.00	$2,895
1930	Vander Pool	Whitey Abel	D. R. "Puddin" McDaniel	Tennessee Stable (Agnes Allen)	6 F	1:13.80	$5,100
1929	Flying Heels	Willie Kelsay	Henry McDaniel	Gifford A. Cochran	6 F	1:12.80	$4,350
1928	Chatford	Clarence Watters	Andrew Walker	Dave Lederer	6 F	1:12.80	$4,250
1927	Excalibur	George Ellis	Clyde S. Phillips	Greentree Stable	6 F	1:12.00	$4,950
1926	Sweepster	Laverne Fator	Sam Hildreth	Rancocas Stable	6 F	1:12.60	$4,500
1925	Timmara	Harold Thurber	John O. Burttschell	T. W. O'Brien	6 F	1:13.40	$4,175
1924	Master Charlie	George Babin	Andrew G. Blakely	William Daniel	6 F	1:11.60	$4,675
1923	Ladkin	Harold Thurber	Louis Feustel	August Belmont Jr.	6 F	1:12.00	$4,075
1922	Tall Timber	James Butwell	T. J. Healey	Richard T. Wilson Jr.	6 F	1:12.00	$4,125
1921	Missionary	Andy Schuttinger	Kimball Patterson	Lexington Stable (E. F. Simms & H. W. Oliver)	6 F	1:13.60	$4,450
1920	Grey Lag	Lavelle Ensor	Sam Hildreth	Sam Hildreth	6 F	1:13.00	$3,625
1919	Pilgrim	Charles Fairbrother	Thomas Welsh	Joseph E. Widener	6 F	1:12.80	$2,675
1918	War Pennant	Johnny Loftus	Walter B. Jennings	A. Kingsley Macomber	6 F	1:13.20	$1,925
1909	– 1917	Race not held					
1908	The Turk	Carroll Shilling	Richard O. Miller	Silver Brook Farm	5.5 F	1:08.20	$1,050
1908	Race not held						
1907	King Cobalt	Eddie Dugan	Algernon W. Claxon	Brownleigh Park Stable	5.5 F	1:07.40	$1,525
1906	Frank Gill	Joe Notter	John I. Smith	J. L. McGinnis	5.5 F	1:08.00	$1,635
1905	Jacobite	Joseph A. Jones	A. Jack Joyner	Sydney Paget	5.5 F	1:07.40	$1,810
1904	Dandelion	Willie Davis	John E. Madden	Francis R. Hitchcock	5.5 F	1:06.80	$1,535

- 1984 – Stone White finished first, but was disqualified from purse money.
- 1980 – Akureyri finished first, but was disqualified and placed third.
- 1952 – Jamie K finished first, but was disqualified.
- 1940, 1944 – Dead heat for the win.

== See also ==
- Road to the Kentucky Derby
