= 1994 Kentucky Derby =

Horse race

120th Kentucky Derby
- Kentucky Derby
- Location: Churchill Downs
- Date: May 7, 1994
- Winning horse: Go for Gin
- Jockey: Chris McCarron
- Trainer: Nick Zito
- Owner: William J. Condren & Joseph M. Cornacchia
- Conditions: Sloppy
- Surface: Dirt
- Attendance: 130,594

The 1994 Kentucky Derby was the 120th running of the Kentucky Derby. The race took place on May 7, 1994. There were 130,594 in attendance. Rain made this the first sloppy track since 1948.

== Payout ==
The 120th Kentucky Derby Payout Schedule

Program Number	Horse Name	Win	Place	Show
6	Go for Gin	$ 20.20	$8.40	$5.80
5	Strodes Creek	-	$7.80	$6.00
10	Blumin Affair	-	-	$8.00

- $2 Exacta: (6-5) Paid $184.80
- $2 Trifecta: (6-5-10) Paid $2,351.40

== Full results ==
Finished	Post	Horse	Jockey	Trainer	Owner	Time / behind
1st	8	Go for Gin	Chris McCarron	Nick Zito	W.J. Condren & J.M. Cornacchia	2:03.72
2nd	7	Strodes Creek	Eddie Delahoussaye	Charles Whittingham	Hancock, Rose Hill Stable, Whittingham	
3rd	13	Blumin Affair	Jerry D. Bailey	Jack Van Berg	Leroy Bowman & Arthur Vogel	
4th	10	Brocco	Gary Stevens	Randy Winick	Albert & Dana Broccoli	
5th	1	Soul of the Matter	Kent Desormeaux	Richard Mandella	Burt Bacharach	
6th	9	Tabasco Cat	Pat Day	D. Wayne Lukas	Overbrook Farm & D.P. Reynolds	
7th	12	Southern Rhythm	Garrett Gomez	James O. Keefer	Heiligbrodt, Keefer, New	
8th	3	Powis Castle	Chris Antley	Rodney Rash	Vistas Stables	
9th	6	Mahogany Hall	Willie Martinez	James E. Baker	Robert Hoeweler	
10th	11	Smilin Singin Sam	Larry Melancon	Niall M. O'Callaghan	Dogwood Stable	
11th	14	Meadow Flight	Shane Sellers	James Ryerson	Ben J. Aliyuee Stables	
12th	4	Holy Bull	Mike E. Smith	Warren A. Croll, Jr.	Warren A. Croll, Jr.	
13th	2	Valiant Nature	Laffit Pincay, Jr.	Ronald McAnally	Verne H. Winchell	
14th	5	Ulises	Jorge Chavez	Alfredo Callejas	Robert Perez	

- Winning Breeder: Pamela duPont Darmstadt; (KY)
