= Nobiz Like Shobiz =

American-bred Thoroughbred racehorse

- Nobiz Like Shobiz at Old Friends (2024)
- Sire: Albert the Great
- Grandsire: Go for Gin
- Dam: Nightstorm
- Damsire: Storm Cat
- Sex: Stallion
- Foaled: 2004
- Country: United States
- Colour: Bay
- Breeder: Elizabeth J. Valando
- Owner: Elizabeth J. Valando
- Trainer: Barclay Tagg
- Record: 13: 7-2-1
- Earnings: $1,544,730 (as of Nov. 5, 2007)

Major wins
- Remsen Stakes (2006); Holy Bull Stakes (2007); Wood Memorial Stakes (2007); U.S. Racing Hall of Fame Stakes (2007); Kent Breeders' Cup Stakes (2007); Jamaica Handicap (2007)
- Last updated on October 7, 2007

Nobiz Like Shobiz (born January 29, 2004) is an American Thoroughbred racehorse, who during his three-year-old season was considered a top contender for the 2007 U.S. Triple Crown series of races. Though he did not place in the Kentucky Derby, Nobiz added to his stakes winnings by making a successful conversion to turf racing after the Derby.

The horse was given the name Nobiz Like Shobiz by his show business owner Elizabeth J. Valando whose late husband Tommy Valando was a Broadway theatre producer and owner of an important music publishing business. She and her husband owned Fly So Free, the 1990 U.S. Champion Two-Year-Old who won that year's Breeders' Cup Juvenile.

Nobiz Like Shobiz was sired by multiple Graded stakes race winner, Albert the Great, a son of the 1994 Kentucky Derby winner, Go for Gin. His damsire is Storm Cat, who was the stallion with the highest breeding fee in North America. Trained by Barclay Tagg who notably trained Kentucky Derby and Preakness Stakes winner Funny Cide, Nobiz Like Shobiz was an awkward colt who did not start his racing career until late in his two-year-old season. Tagg said of his first sight of the colt on a Florida farm, "Before he jogged three steps, I called Elizabeth Valando and said, 'This is the most gorgeous horse I've ever seen. If he's not a Triple Crown candidate, they've never made one.'"

== 2006 racing season ==
Nobiz Like Shobiz made his racing debut in early September 2006 at Belmont Park, it was an impressive one. Racing at a distance of a full mile, he won by 10 3/4 lengths. Owner Elizabeth J Valando was then offered $17 million for the colt by Sheikh Mohammed bin Rashid Al Maktoum. She turned it down. Nobiz Like Shobiz competed for the second time in mid October in the important Champagne Stakes against two-year-olds, many of whom had more racing experience. Nobiz Like Shobiz finished second by 3/4 of a length to Scat Daddy who overtook him in the homestretch. Although he had run a solid race, his trainer chose to skip the November 4th $2 million Breeders' Cup Juvenile, preferring to allow the colt to mature more while continuing his training.

As such, his next outing, and last of 2006, was in the Grade-2 $200,000 US Remsen Stakes where he won by an impressive 6 1/2-lengths. He earned a very respectable Beyer Speed Figure of 97 and his time of (1:48.82) was the fastest Remsen at the distance since 1977, when Believe It won in (1:47.80). Nobiz Like Shobiz was wintered in Barn 16 at Gulfstream Park in Florida along with Funny Cide.

== 2007 racing season ==
Barclay Tagg had indicated for 2007 he would enter Nobiz Like Shobiz into three prep races—all at 1 1/8 miles (1.8 km)—before the Kentucky Derby. The first would be the Grade 3 Holy Bull Stakes on February 3. Going off as the favorite, Nobiz Like Shobiz outran his rival Scat Daddy and won going away by one and one/half lengths. In the March 3rd Fountain of Youth Stakes he lugged in during the stretch and finished third. Equipped with blinkers, he held off a late rally from longshot Sightseeing to win the G1 Wood Memorial Stakes by 1/2 length as the 7/10 favorite. Second choice Any Given Saturday (3/2 odds) was 3 3/4 lengths behind the winner in third.

Nobiz Like Shobiz had a seemingly perfect trip in the 2007 Kentucky Derby, stalking the pace in 4th into the stretch. As he angled to the outside for his stretch run under jockey Cornelio Velásquez, the pace of the race picked up dramatically and Nobiz Like Shobiz failed to generate a late run, finishing 10th in the full field of 20. In his next race, July 4, he finished a well-beaten second to Any Given Saturday in the Grade II Dwyer Stakes.

After that defeat, and because Nobiz was running down on dirt (burning his heels and ankles on the rough surface), trainer Barclay Tagg began training him for grass racing. On August 6, 2007, Nobiz won his first start on turf: the National Museum of Racing Hall of Fame Stakes under Cornelio Velazquez. On September 1, he won again on turf in the Grade III Kent Breeders' Cup Stakes at Delaware Park Racetrack. The following October he captured his third straight turf race by winning the Grade II Jamaica Handicap. He was entered in the Breeders Cup (Turf) Mile on October 27 and briefly seemed poised to make a strong move but managed only to finish fourth on a rain-softened turf course. In the late-November Hollywood Derby, he was unable to catch front-running Daytona and again finished out of the money.

== Overall racing statistics ==
As of October 2007, Nobiz Like Shobiz has won seven races in thirteen starts. He has finished out of the money three times: in the 2007 Kentucky Derby (tenth), the 2007 Breeders Cup (Turf) Mile (fourth) and the 2007 Hollywood Derby (sixth). His total career earnings are just over $1,500,000 US.

== Retirement ==
On May 25, 2008, Barclay Tagg announced that Nobiz Like Shobiz would retire. Tagg felt that certain ailments were bound to keep the horse from achieving his best at the track.

Nobiz Like Shobiz stood at stud for $7500 at Darby Dan Farm in Kentucky for the 2009 breeding season. For the 2010 breeding season, his fee was dropped to $2500.

The first reported foal by Nobiz Like Shobiz was a filly out of stakes-winning mare Rachele'sprincess (by Summing). The filly, born January 27 at Haymarket Farm in Kentucky, is half-sister to stakes winner Gabrieles Princess and stakes-placed Lil Joes Luckycent.

In 2016, Nobiz Like Shobiz was retired to Old Friends in Georgetown, Kentucky.
