= Tabasco Cat =

American-bred Thoroughbred racehorse

- Sire: Storm Cat
- Grandsire: Storm Bird
- Dam: Barbicue Sauce
- Damsire: Sauce Boat
- Sex: Stallion
- Foaled: April 15th, 1991
- Died: March 6th, 2004 (aged 12); Shizunai Stallion Station, Hokkaido, Japan
- Country: United States
- Colour: Chestnut
- Breeder: Overbrook & David P. Reynolds
- Owner: Overbrook & David P. Reynolds
- Trainer: D. Wayne Lukas
- Record: 18: 8-3-2
- Earnings: $2,347,671

Major wins
- San Rafael Stakes (1994); El Camino Real Derby (1994); Kentucky Cup Classic Handicap (1994) Triple Crown race wins: Preakness Stakes (1994); Belmont Stakes (1994)
- Last updated on June 13, 2007

Tabasco Cat (April 15, 1991 – March 6, 2004) was an American Thoroughbred racehorse. He was best known for his performances in 1994 when he won the Preakness Stakes and the Belmont Stakes, the second and third legs of the Triple Crown Series.

== Background ==
A son of Storm Cat, who in 2006 became the world's most expensive stallion, Tabasco Cat was out of the mare Barbicue Sauce. He was bred on a foal share partnership between Overbrook Farm owner William T. Young and Reynolds Metals Chairman David P. Reynolds. He was trained by D. Wayne Lukas and ridden by jockey Pat Day.

== Racing career ==
=== 1993:two-year-old season ===
Tabasco Cat's most important win as a 2-year-old came in the Fort Springs Stakes at Keeneland Race Course. In his last race of 1993, the colt finished third to winner Brocco in the Breeders' Cup Juvenile.

In December 1993, Tabasco Cat seriously injured Jeff Lukas, who worked for his father as an assistant trainer. In a shedrow accident at Santa Anita Park, the colt broke loose and when Jeff Lukas tried to stop him, the excited horse slammed into him with such force that it fractured his skull and left him in a coma for several weeks. Jeff Lukas suffered permanent brain damage; he had changes in personality, vision loss, and damage to his memory. By spring of 1994, he had recovered enough that he attempted to return to horse racing, but after a series of less-demanding jobs ending in 2003, it was clear he could not work safely around race horses. He also tried living and working near horse farms, but his disabilities were too severe for him to be safe around horses at all. He ultimately moved to Atoka, Oklahoma in 2007 to work for David Burrage, who had been the accountant and general manager for Lukas Racing Stables. At that time, Burrage was a banker and owned the First Bank in Atoka, which employed Lukas, who lived a quiet life until his death at age 58 in March 2016.

=== 1994:three-year-old season ===
In the spring of 1994, in the run-up to the U.S. Triple Crown series, Tabasco Cat won January's San Rafael Stakes and the El Camino Real Derby in March, then finished second to Brocco in the Grade I Santa Anita Derby.

Sent to Churchill Downs for the Kentucky Derby, Tabasco Cat was sent off at more than 9:1 odds as the bettors third choice. Owner/trainer Warren A. Croll, Jr. had the heavy favorite in Holy Bull, with second choice going to Tabasco Cat's California nemesis, Brocco. At the start of the Kentucky Derby, eventual longshot winner Go for Gin ducked out, forcing Tabasco Cat into another horse. Although the colt recovered and rider Pat Day got him to within striking distance of the frontrunners, he tired in the stretch run and finished sixth. Brocco finished fourth, and Holy Bull was twelfth.

Tabasco Cat went on to win the next two legs of the U.S. Triple Crown series, capturing both the Preakness Stakes at Pimlico Race Course and the Belmont Stakes at Belmont Park. Go for Gin finished second in both races. In the fall of 1994, Tabasco Cat defeated Best Pal in winning the inaugural Kentucky Cup Classic Stakes. He finished third behind Holy Bull and Concern in the Travers Stakes at Saratoga Race Course and was second to the latter in the Breeders' Cup Classic.

== Stud career ==
Retired to stud duty after his 3-year-old season, Tabasco Cat sired several stakes winners at Overbrook Farm. Among his notable offspring were the colt Snow Ridge, the multiple stakes winning filly Habibti, and another filly, Island Sand who earned more than $1.1 million and won several stakes races including the Grade I Acorn Stakes.

In the fall of 2000, Tabasco Cat was sold to the Japan Bloodstock Breeders' Association and stood at their Shizunai Stallion Station until 2004, when he died at age thirteen from a heart attack while in the breeding shed. In all, Tabasco Cat sired twenty-one stakes race winners.

== Pedigree ==
Pedigree of Tabasco Cat
Sire Storm Cat brown 1983	Storm Bird bay 1978	Northern Dancer bay 1961	Nearctic
Sire Storm Cat brown 1983	Storm Bird bay 1978	Northern Dancer bay 1961	Natalma
Sire Storm Cat brown 1983	Storm Bird bay 1978	South Ocean bay 1967	New Providence
Sire Storm Cat brown 1983	Storm Bird bay 1978	South Ocean bay 1967	Shining Sun
Sire Storm Cat brown 1983	Terlingua chestnut 1976	Secretariat chestnut 1970	Bold Ruler
Sire Storm Cat brown 1983	Terlingua chestnut 1976	Secretariat chestnut 1970	Somethingroyal
Sire Storm Cat brown 1983	Terlingua chestnut 1976	Crimson Saint chestnut 1969	Crimson Satan
Sire Storm Cat brown 1983	Terlingua chestnut 1976	Crimson Saint chestnut 1969	Bolero Rose
Dam Barbique Sauce bay 1983	Sauce Boat chestnut 1975	Key To The Mint bay 1969	Graustark
Dam Barbique Sauce bay 1983	Sauce Boat chestnut 1975	Key To The Mint bay 1969	Key Bridge
Dam Barbique Sauce bay 1983	Sauce Boat chestnut 1975	Missy Babba bay 1958	My Babu
Dam Barbique Sauce bay 1983	Sauce Boat chestnut 1975	Missy Babba bay 1958	Uriva
Dam Barbique Sauce bay 1983	Lady Barbizon bay 1970	Barbizon bay 1954	Polynesian
Dam Barbique Sauce bay 1983	Lady Barbizon bay 1970	Barbizon bay 1954	Good Blood
Dam Barbique Sauce bay 1983	Lady Barbizon bay 1970	Cancelada bay 1958	Nigromante
Dam Barbique Sauce bay 1983	Lady Barbizon bay 1970	Cancelada bay 1958	Caninha
