= Tommy Valando =

Thomas F. "Tommy" Valando (March 1, 1916 – February 14, 1995) was a Broadway producer and owner of a New York City music publishing company, Tommy Valando Publishing Group, Inc.

Valando played a role in the emergence of BMI songwriters on the Broadway scene. In the early 1950s, he was responsible for composer Jerry Bock getting onto Broadway with the score for Catch a Star. In 1964, he introduced John Kander and Fred Ebb who became a prominent songwriting team.

Valando's company published the scores to such Broadway shows as:

- Fiorello! (1959)
- She Loves Me (1963)
- Fiddler on the Roof (1964)
- Cabaret (1966)
- Zorba (1968)
- Company (1970)
- Follies (1972)
- A Little Night Music (1973)
- Sweeney Todd (1979)
- Woman of the Year (1981)
- Sunday in the Park with George (1984)

== Thoroughbred horse racing ==
Valando and his wife Elizabeth Jones Valando owned several racehorses, including the 1990 U.S. Champion Two-Year-Old colt Fly So Free who won the Breeders' Cup Juvenile.

The Valandos were living in Greenwich, Connecticut at the time of his death in 1995. Elizabeth continued their involvement in thoroughbred racing and was the owner of Nobiz Like Shobiz, who was rated as a top contender for the 2007 U.S. Triple Crown series of races.
