= Stronach Stables =

Stronach Stables is the North American racing arm of Thoroughbred horse racing owner and breeder, Frank Stronach, who also owns the horse breeding operation Adena Springs. Stronach is also the CEO of the Stronach Group which owns racetracks that include Santa Anita Park, Gulfstream Park, Pimlico Race Course and Laurel Park

The Stronach racing operation has owned and raced notable Thoroughbreds Glorious Song, Touch Gold and Giacomo in partnership with others. Among Stonach wholly owned horses, Ghostzapper won several major races including the 2004 Breeders' Cup Classic, was voted the Eclipse Award for Horse of the Year, and named the World's Top Ranked Horse for 2004.

In Canada, Frank Stronach/Stronach Stables has won the Sovereign Award for Outstanding Owner nine times. In the United States, Stronach earned the Eclipse Award for Outstanding Owner in 1998, 1999, and 2000.

In 2000, Frank Stronach won the Eclipse Award for Outstanding Breeder. He subsequently established Adena Springs which owns horse breeding farms in Kentucky, Florida and Canada and won the Eclipse Award for Outstanding Breeder in 2004, 2005 and 2006.

Stronach Stables is a finalist for the Eclipse Award for Outstanding Owner for 2008.

== Selected major race wins ==
=== Canadian Triple Crown Races ===
- Blitzer : (Breeders' Stakes - 1992)
- Basqueian (Queen's Plate : Breeders' Stakes - 1994)
- Awesome Again : (Queen's Plate - 1997)
- Royal Challenger : (Breeders' Stakes - 2006)

=== United States Triple Crown Races ===
- Touch Gold : (Belmont Stakes - 1997)
- Red Bullet : (Preakness Stakes - 2000)

=== Breeders' Cup races ===
- Awesome Again : (Classic - 1998)
- Ghostzapper : (Classic - 2004)
- Macho Uno : (Juvenile - 2000)
- Perfect Sting : (Filly & Mare Turf - 2000)
- Ginger Punch : (Ladies Classic - 2007)
