= High-performance instrumented airborne platform for environmental research =

Research aircraft

HIAPER
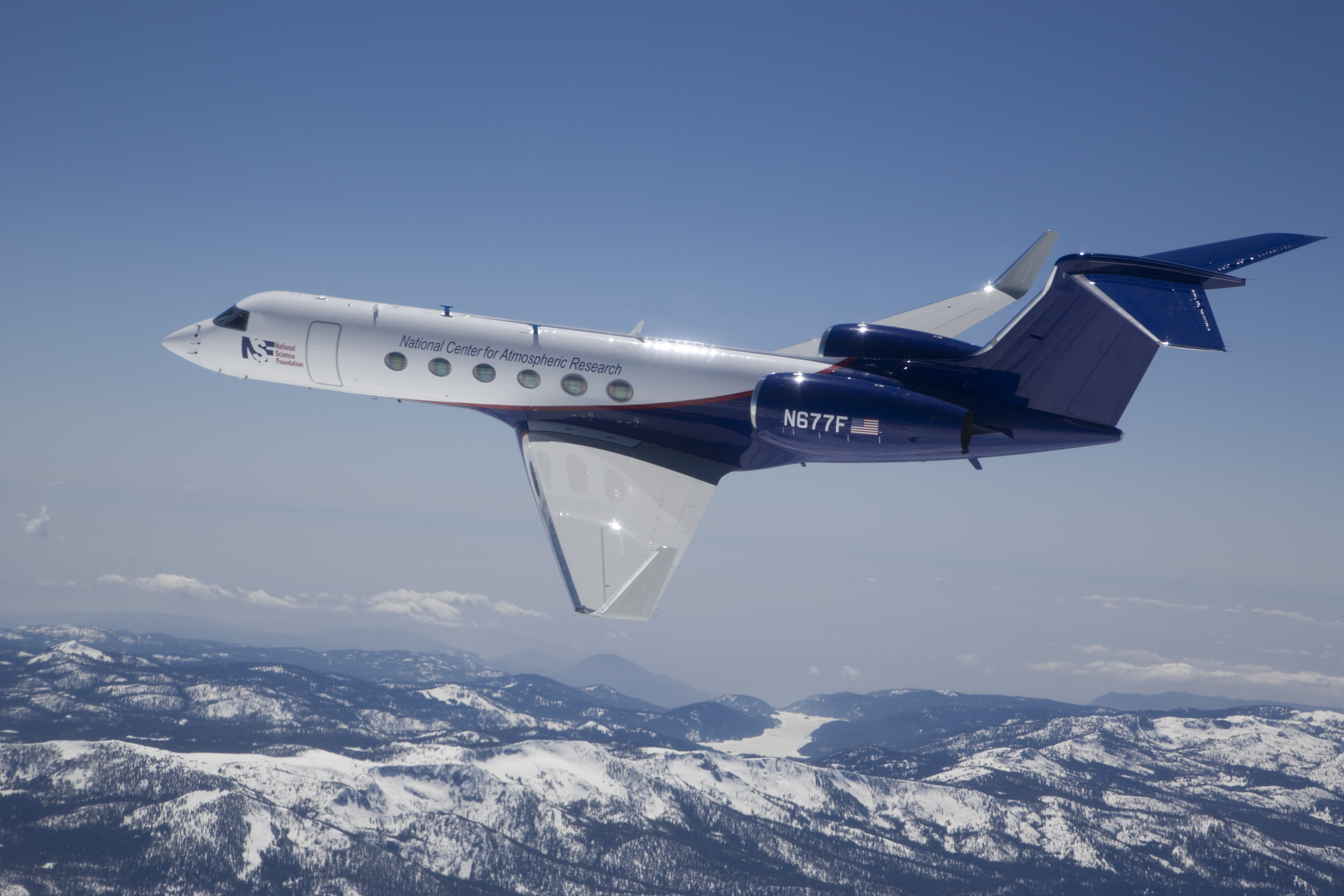
- NSF/NCAR Gulfstream V research aircraft

General information
- Type: atmospheric research
- Manufacturer: Gulfstream
- Primary user: National Center for Atmospheric Research
- Number built: 1

History
- Developed from: Gulfstream V

The high-performance instrumented airborne platform for environmental research (HIAPER) is a modified Gulfstream V aircraft operated by the Earth Observing Laboratory at the National Center for Atmospheric Research (NCAR) in Boulder, Colorado. The aircraft was purchased brand-new from Gulfstream Aerospace in 2002 and then modified by Lockheed Martin in Greenville, South Carolina over a period of two years, for a total cost of $80 million.

The aircraft includes a wing mounted cloud radar which allows researchers a high resolution view into snow producing storms. The aircraft is designed and instrumented to observe and measure clouds from the stratosphere.

The HIAPER cloud radar (HCR) is an airborne, polarimetric, millimeter-wavelength radar capable of cloud remote sensing. Whole air samplers also collect air samples for later analysis on the ground.

Data collected by the 2013 HIAPER Pole-to-Pole Observations (HIPPO) campaign is publicly available.
