= Adena Springs Ranch =

Cattle ranch in Florida, United States

Coordinates: 29.33692°N 81.96597°W

Adena Springs Ranch is the former name of a 30,000-acre cattle ranch in Florida's Marion County now known as Sleepy Creek Ranch Lands. Adena Ranches is a related cattle ranch property in Levy County. Both are owned by Canadian billionaire Frank Stronach.

Sleepy Creek Ranch Lands (formerly Adena Springs Ranch) is located near Gainesville. The first 24,000 acres cost $62 million with another $18 million in expenditures expected. The ranch is expected to produce all-natural, hormone-free, grass-fed beef cattle on the once wooded property, in part to supply a planned chain of restaurants. Stronach has indicated that 40 percent of the land would remain wooded for commercial timber. A $30 million, 61,000-square-foot abattoir is also part of the plan as well as a biomass energy plant to power it. Concerns have been raised over water usage plans and how springs (including the artesian Silver Springs of Silver Springs, Florida) will be affected. Flow from Silver Springs has already dropped by 50% in the past few years due to an ongoing drought. Stronach has filed for a permit to pump more than 13 million gallons of water from the Floridan aquifer daily from the St. Johns River Water Management District. This is more than the city of Ocala uses for its 150,000 people.

Stronach is also developing an upscale golf course community (Ocala Meadows Farms) at U.S. 441 and State Road 326. The $60 million development is the most recent venture for the founder Magna International and former owner thoroughbred horse racing tracks in Florida, Maryland and California.

== See also ==
- Ted Turner
- Ralph Lauren
- Adena Springs, horse breeding operation
