= Allen Paulson =

American businessman (1922–2000)

- Born: Allen Eugene Paulson; April 22, 1922; Clinton, Iowa, U.S.
- Died: July 19, 2000 (aged 78); La Jolla, California, U.S.
- Resting place: Forest Lawn Memorial Park, Glendale
- Occupations: Businessman (Aircraft manufacturing); Racehorse owner/breeder; Philanthropist
- Spouse(s): Irene, Mary Lou, Madeleine
- Children: 4
- Honors: Aviation: James H. Doolittle Award (1982); Wright Brothers Memorial Trophy (1987); Harmon Trophy (1987); Howard Hughes Memorial Award (1988); Award for Meritorious Service to Aviation (1994); Thoroughbred racing: Eclipse Award for Outstanding Breeder (1993); Eclipse Award for Outstanding Owner (1995, 1996); Eclipse Award of Merit (1996); Keeneland Mark of Distinction (2000)

Allen Eugene Paulson (April 22, 1922 – July 19, 2000) was an American businessman.

== Business career in aviation ==
Born in Clinton, Iowa, Allen E. Paulson was on his own at age 13, supporting himself selling newspapers and doing janitorial work at local hotel until he moved to California in 1937. There, he worked on a dairy farm to pay his way through school. After finishing high school in 1941, he took a 30-cent-per-hour job as an entry-level mechanic for TWA. In 1943-45 he served in the US Army Air Corps and spent a year studying engineering at the University of West Virginia. After the war, he went back to TWA, this time as a flight engineer, and used his GI Bill to get his pilot's license. He then began flying commercially for TWA. Using his TWA travel privileges, he began flying to Chicago to buy cars that he drove back to California to sell. Soon, he had a van and was transporting a number of vehicles on every trip.

He left TWA to form his own company in 1951, first buying surplus Wright R-3350 engines from Boeing B-29s and selling the parts to airlines. In 1955, he purchased his first aircraft for resale, stripping the aircraft for parts and scrapping the rest and later rebuilding one aircraft for resale out of the parts of several. The first airplanes he bought were three Convair 240s; Western Airlines had turned to Lockheed Electras. Later, he bought all of TWA's Martin 404s. He sold those, along with Convair 240 and 340 models, for corporate airplanes.

His company, the California Airmotive Corp., became one of the largest dealers in second-hand aircraft (particularly second-hand airliners) in the world. At one time he had 35 Lockheed Constellations of various models, 22 Douglas DC-6s and DC-7s and 4 other airliners in storage at Fox Field in Lancaster, California in 1970/71, not to mention other aircraft at other airfields such as Burbank.

A subsidiary company during the early 1960s was West Coast Airmotive Corporation. Allen Paulson bought out the Pacific Airmotive Corp. at Burbank and started converting various types of passenger transport to freighters. Several Lockheed Constellations were rebuilt by Paulson's company and converted to freighter aircraft. California Airmotive was renamed American Jet Industries in 1973.

In November 1970, he and his friend Clay Lacy entered an ex-American Airlines Douglas DC-7BF (N759Z msn 45233) in the California 1000 Mile Air Race at Mojave. Named "Super Snoopy", the airplane finished in a commendable sixth place in a field of twenty and still had 1,500 gallons of fuel remaining at the end. One writer observed during the race that the DC-7 flew lower than some of the single-engined aircraft and that it flew faster and made better pylon turns than a competing Douglas A-26 Invader. The race was won by a Hawker Sea Fury in 2 hours 52 minutes and 38 seconds at an average speed of 344.08 mph. When a second 1000-mile race was scheduled for Brown Field near San Diego, California in July 1971, the Paulson teamed with Lockheed test pilot Herman "Fish" Salmon and entered Lockheed L-1049G Super Constellation N9723C the "Red Baron", which once served Qantas as VH-EAP "Southern Zephyr", while Clay Lacy entered "Super Snoopy". The "Red Baron" qualified for the race, rounding the pylons at 200 feet. The other pilots entered in the race held a meeting the night prior to the race, and advised Darryl Greenamyer, who was in charge of the race arrangements, that if the two big airplanes participated, they wouldn't, so the two aircraft were withdrawn.

In 1970, Paulson began to develop the American Jet Hustler, a corporate aircraft that featured a propeller in front for short runway use, and a jet in back for high-altitude cruising. The concept was a pressurised business aircraft powered by a Pratt & Whitney PT6 in the nose and equipped with a standby Teledyne Continental turbine unit in the tail. The aircraft first flew on January 11, 1978, but never entered production.

In 1978, he seized the opportunity to buy the Grumman American plants and offices from Grumman for $52 million, forming the Gulfstream American Corporation. In 1982, he bought Rockwell International's aviation division in Oklahoma and combined it with Gulfstream American to form Gulfstream Aerospace. Paulson transformed the company into the world's largest manufacturer of private jets. Sales increased to $1 billion yearly. In June 1985, he sold the company to Chrysler for $637 million. He was awarded the Clarence E. Page Memorial Trophy from the Oklahoma Air and Space Hall of Fame in 1989. In 1990, with the assistance of Forstmann Little & Company, Paulson purchased all 25 million shares of Gulfstream's common stock from Chrysler, an investment of some $825 million. Paulson announced his retirement in January 1992 and his shares in the company were purchased by Forstmann Little.

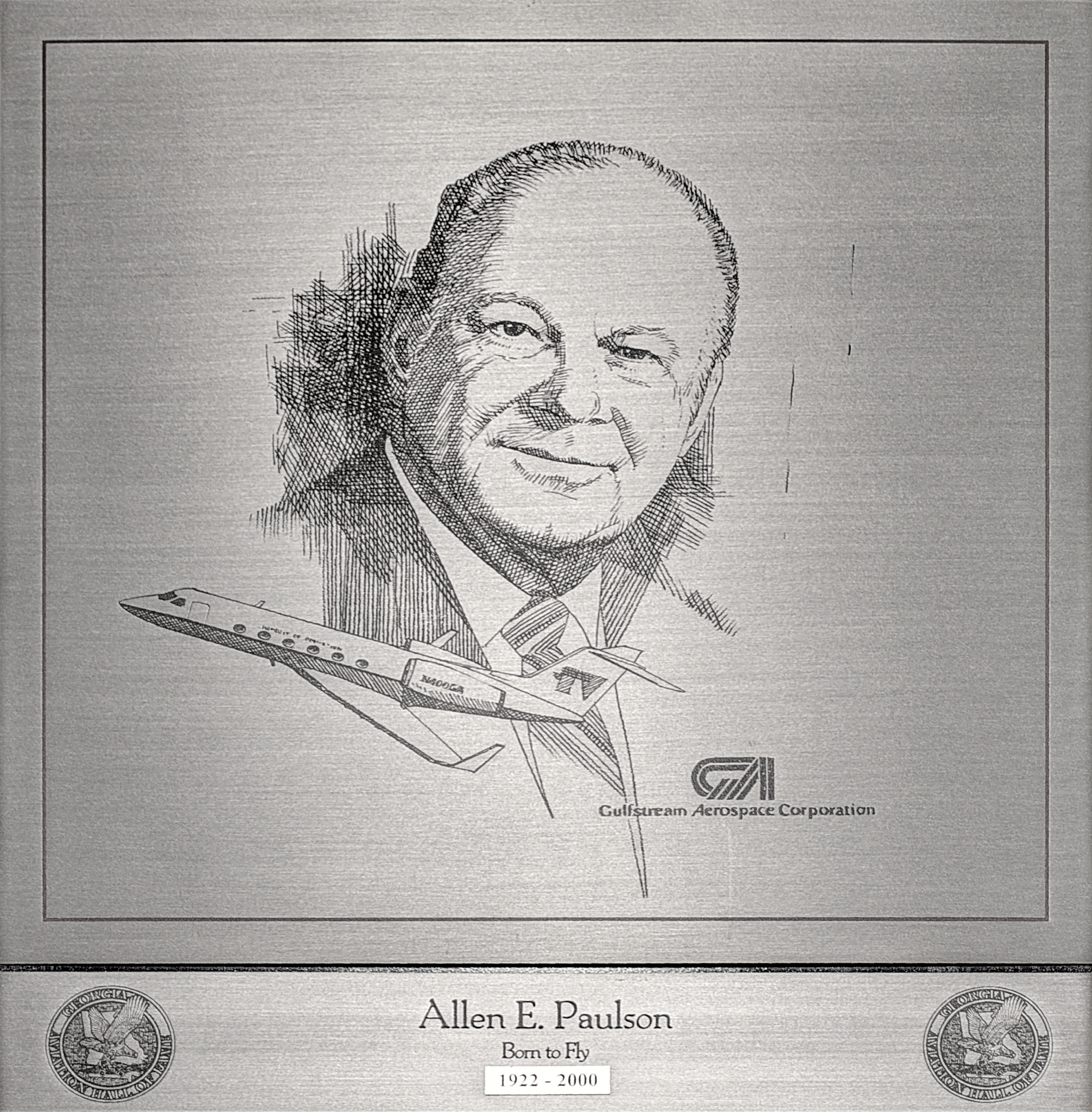
Plaque honoring Paulson at the Georgia Aviation Hall of Fame

In 1990, Paulson and a Gulfstream flight crew set 35 international records for around-the-world flight in a Gulfstream IV aircraft. In 1987 he won the Harmon Trophy as the world's outstanding aviator, and in 1992 was inducted into the Georgia Aviation Hall of Fame. Allen E. Paulson received numerous other awards during his lifetime including five honorary doctorates, the Award for Meritorious Service to Aviation by the National Business Aviation Association, Inc. and the Golden Plate Award of the American Academy of Achievement.

== Other business interests ==
In the early 1990s, Paulson bought many automotive dealerships in Beverly Hills, California, where he resided. He bought the Ford, Cadillac, Lincoln-Mercury, Infiniti, and Rolls-Royce franchises in the area and opened a Lexus dealership in Beverly Hills. In 1993, he and his wife Madeleine bought the Del Mar Country Club in Rancho Santa Fe, California

== Thoroughbred horse racing ==
In 1983, Allen Paulson got involved in the sport of thoroughbred horse racing. He eventually became a significant force in racing in North America and in France. A major breeder, he operated horse farms in Kentucky, Florida and California

His first American Champion in racing was Estrapade, the 1986 Eclipse Award winner as American Champion Female Turf Horse. He owned Arazi, the 1991 European Horse of the Year for whom Sheikh Mohammed paid him $9 million for a half interest. He also owned the Champion filly Azeri, although he did not live to see her compete, but his son, Michael, campaigned Azeri over three championship seasons for Paulson's trust. Paulson's most famous American horse was U.S. Racing Hall of Fame inductee, Cigar, a darling of race fans and the media alike who captured the Breeders' Cup Classic, the first Dubai World Cup, and was voted Eclipse Award as American Horse of the Year in 1995 and 1996 while winning a record 16 straight races.

Allen Paulson owned more than 115 winners of graded stakes races. His horses won a record eight Breeders' Cup races and earned him more Breeders' Cup purse money than any other stable owner. He was voted the American Eclipse Award for Outstanding Owner in 1995 and 1996, the 1993 Eclipse Award for Outstanding Breeder, and the American Thoroughbred horse racing industry's highest honor, the Eclipse Award of Merit. Paulson's accomplishments in the thoroughbred racing arena were numerous, including earning nearly 20 'Eclipse Awards' during his 17 years in the business, and two Hall of Fame horses, Azeri and Cigar. Paulson is still the 'all time' leading owner of 'Breeders' Cup' champion horses and earnings.

== Gaming ==
In 1994, Paulson bought a 17.5 percent stake in casino operator Full House Resorts and became chairman and CEO. He would lead the company until his death.

Separate from Full House, Paulson took ownership of the Gold River casino in Laughlin, Nevada in 1997, having paid an estimated $28 million for the bankrupt property's $90 million in debt. He also agreed to buy the Riviera and Four Queens casinos in Las Vegas for $304 million, but later canceled the deal, stating he was given inadequate financial information.

== Philanthropy ==
A supporter of Georgia Southern University, his company created the Gulfstream Scholarships in engineering technology and as a major benefactor, the university named the Allen E. Paulson College of Engineering and Information Technology in his honor as well as the Allen E. Paulson Stadium.

Paulson died in 2000 in a hospital near La Jolla, California, from cancer at age 78. He is interred at the Forest Lawn Memorial Park in Glendale, California.
