= Gulfstream Peregrine =

Single-engine business jet prototype aircraft

Fanjet 1500 / Peregrine
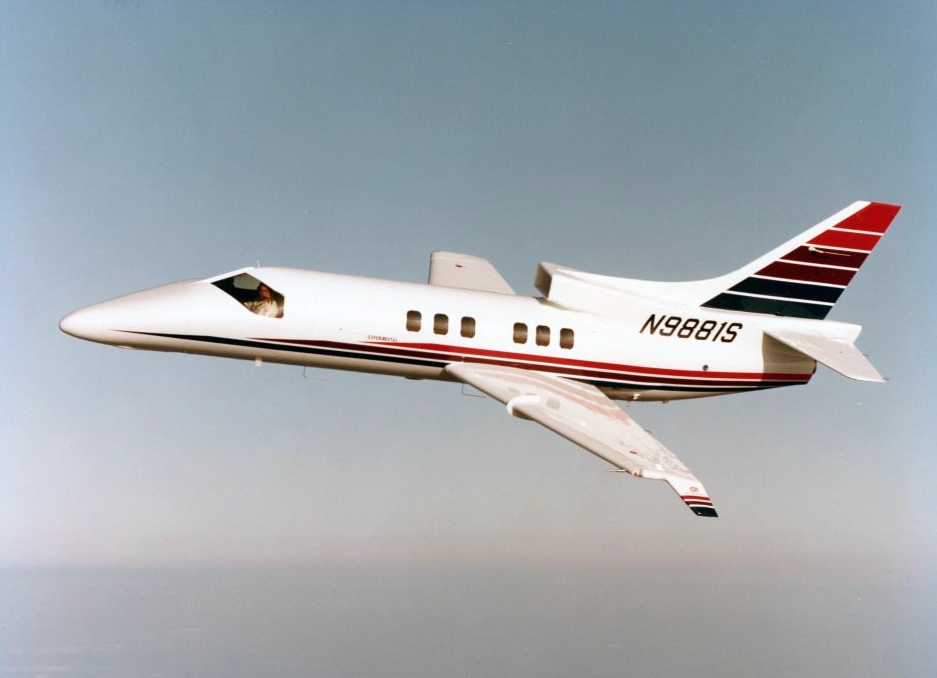
- Fanjet 1500 on flight testing

General information
- Type: Business jet
- National origin: United States
- Manufacturer: Gulfstream Aerospace
- Number built: 1

History
- First flight: 14 January 1983
- Developed from: Gulfstream American Hustler; Gulfstream Peregrine 600

The Gulfstream Aerospace Peregrine was a single-engine business jet prototype aircraft developed in the United States by Gulfstream Aerospace in the early 1980s. It was developed from the company's Hustler business aircraft and the company's military trainer aircraft, the Peregrine 600.

== Design and development ==
The Peregrine was originally known as the Commander Fanjet 1500, and as such it flew for the first time on 14 January 1983. After the cancellation of the Peregrine 600, the Fanjet 1500 was renamed Peregrine. The Hustler's forward fuselage design (with a new nose) was used for the Peregrine, while the Peregrine 600's wings, tail and rear fuselage were incorporated into the new type. In 1984 Gulfstream Aerospace announced that it would go ahead with production after receiving 27 orders with paid deposits. However Gulfstream's inability to produce a design that met regulatory requirements (especially the requirement then in force - since rescinded - that single-engine aircraft have a maximum stalling speed of 61 knots), combined with insufficient orders, resulted in the program being terminated in 1985. The prototype airframe N84GP is on display in the aviation wing of the Science Museum in Oklahoma City, Oklahoma.

== Specifications (proposed production version) ==
Data from The New Observer's Book of Aircraft

General characteristics

- Crew: 1 pilot
- Capacity: 6–7 passengers
- Length: 42 ft 1 1/2 in (12.840 m)
- Wingspan: 39 ft 2 in (11.94 m)
- Height: 16 ft 11 3/4 in (5.175 m)
- Empty weight: 5,120 lb (2,322 kg)
- Max takeoff weight: 8,800 lb (3,992 kg)
- Powerplant: 1 × Pratt & Whitney JT15D-5 turbofan, 2,900 lbf (13 kN) thrust

Performance

- Maximum speed: 416 mph (669 km/h, 361 kn) at 31,000 ft (9,400 m)
- Cruise speed: 381 mph (613 km/h, 331 kn) at 35,000 ft (11,000 m)
- Range: 1,600 mi (2,600 km, 1,400 nmi)
- Service ceiling: 38,400 ft (11,700 m)
- Rate of climb: 2,877 ft/min (14.62 m/s)

== See also ==
Related development

- Gulfstream American Hustler
- Gulfstream Peregrine 600
