= Gulfstream V =

Long-range, large business jet

Gulfstream V C-37A
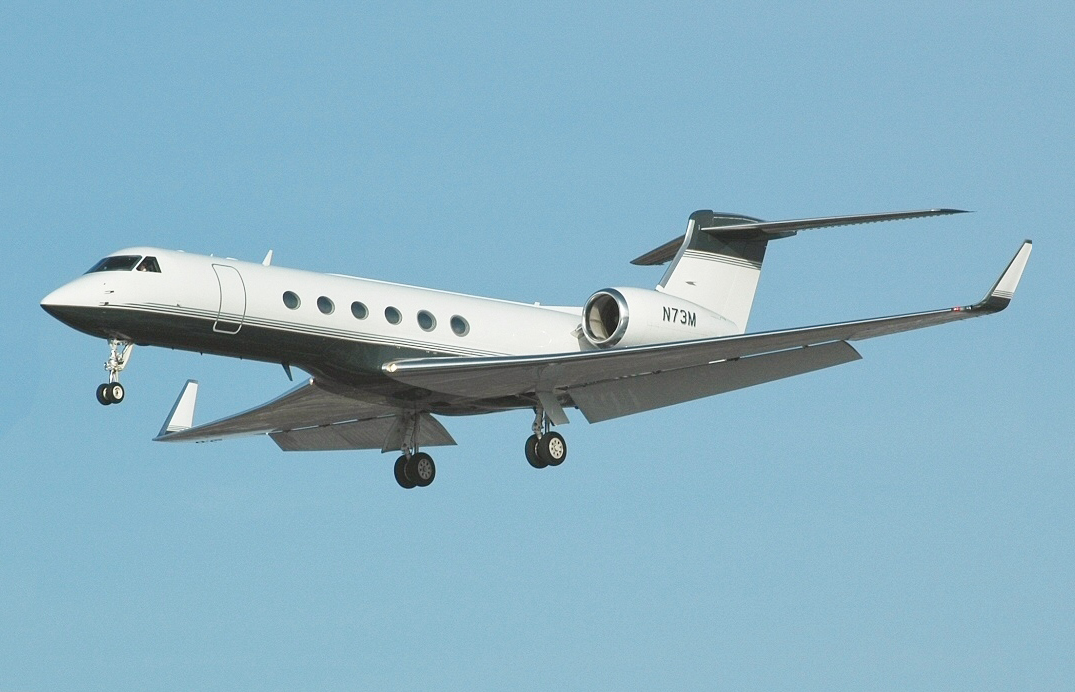

General information
- Type: Business jet
- National origin: United States
- Manufacturer: Gulfstream Aerospace
- Status: In service
- Primary users: United States Air Force United States Coast Guard; United States Navy
- Number built: 193

History
- Manufactured: 1995–2002
- Introduction date: June 1997
- First flight: November 28, 1995
- Developed from: Gulfstream IV
- Developed into: Gulfstream G550

The Gulfstream V (Model GV, pronounced "G-five") is a large, long-range business jet aircraft produced by Gulfstream Aerospace, derived from the previous Gulfstream IV. It has a maximum speed of Mach 0.885 (584 mph; 508 kn; 940 km/h), flight ceiling of 51,000 feet (16,000 m), and a maximum range of 6,500 nmi (7,500 mi; 12,000 km). It typically accommodates four crew and 14 passengers. It first flew on November 28, 1995, and entered service in June 1997. It is used by the US military under the designation C-37A.

In 2003, the GV airframe was succeeded by an improved version, the Gulfstream G550 (Model GV-SP).

== Development ==
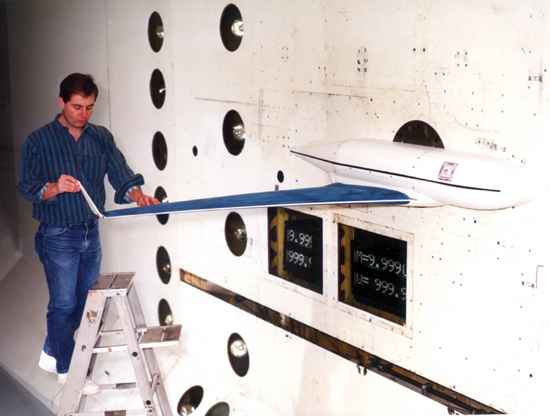
Model in wind tunnel

In the early 1990s, the Gulfstream V (GV) was developed as a response to the Bombardier Global Express. It was certified on April 11, 1997. Capable of flying up to 6,500 nmi (7,500 mi; 12,000 km), it rolled out in 1995 and was Gulfstream's first ultra-long range business jet. Total production of the Gulfstream V was 193 aircraft. By 2018, 1997-1999 Gulfstream GVs were trading at $8.8-10.25 million. By 2019, a GV was worth around $10 million: below $6 million for high time aircraft, up to $13 million for a late model low-time aircraft.

== Design ==
The engines are now Rolls-Royce BR700-710A1-10 with increased thrust, a higher bypass ratio, and Full Authority Digital Engine Controls (FADEC). Operating ceiling increased from 45,000 to 51,000 ft (14,000 to 16,000 m). It has thrust reversers and composite flight control surfaces. The horizontal tail area is 30% larger, wingspan increased from 74.6 to 93.5 ft (22.7 to 28.5 m), and the fuselage is lengthened by 5 ft (1.5 m) forward of the main entry door, and by 2 ft (61 cm) aft of the wing. Maximum takeoff and landing weights are increased by 15%.

It has a new semi supercritical wing with a fuel capacity of 41,000 lb (19 t) which is 12,000 lb (5.4 t) more than the G-IV. The three zone cabin is similar to the G-IV, but smaller than the Global Express, while its dispatch reliability, cabin noise and fuel efficiency compare favourably against its competitors of the same era. Compared to the comparably priced Global Express, the GV offers more range and is more fuel efficient while the Bombardier offers better runway performance, a larger cabin and a softer ride. The BR710 overhaul comes due at 8,000 hours or 10 years and costs $1.25 million per engine.

== Variants ==
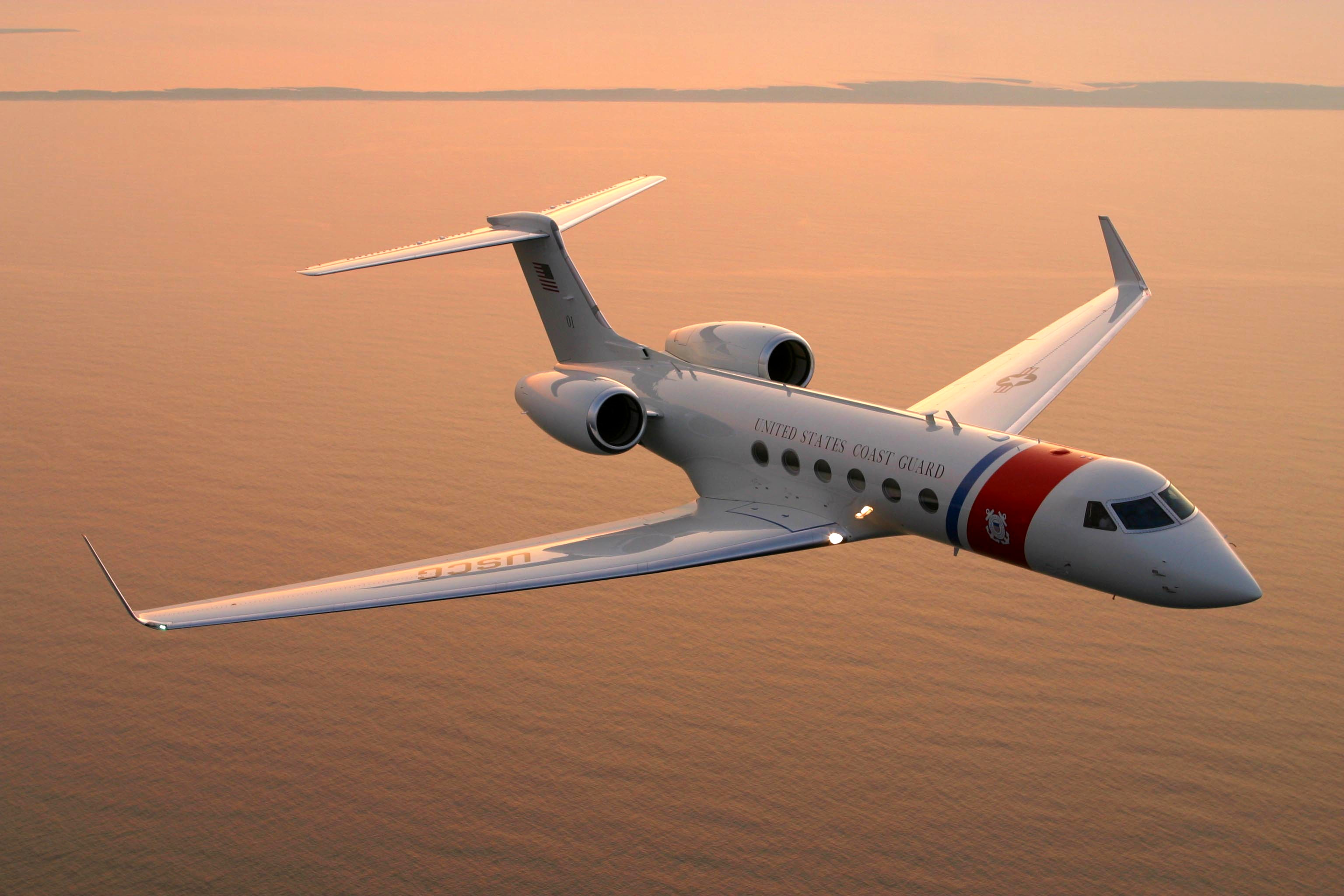
USCG C-37A in flight

G-V
Production aircraft powered by two BMW-Rolls-Royce 700-710A1-10 engines.
C-37A
United States military designation for the G-V aircraft.

== Operators ==
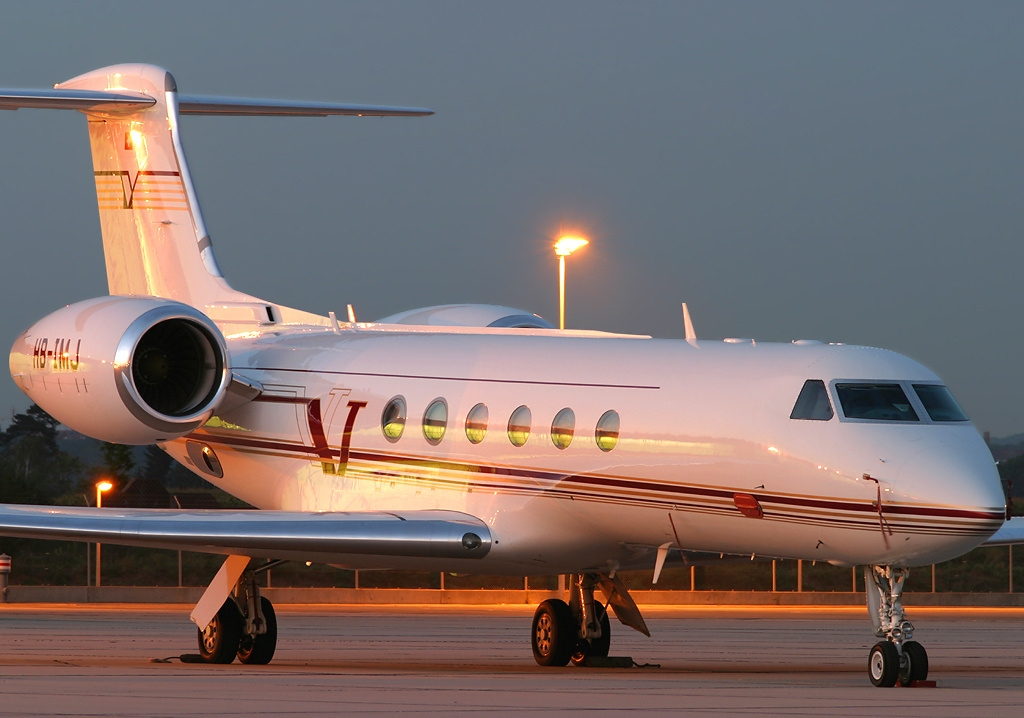
On ramp, Gulfstream V fuselage with six windows

=== Civil operators ===
The majority of G-Vs are operated by corporate and individual owners. Mark Cuban paid $40 million for a Gulfstream V in October 1999, earning a Guinness Record of "largest single e-commerce transaction". Steve Jobs received a Gulfstream V as compensation from Apple in 2000.

=== Government and military operators ===
Algeria

- Algerian Air Force operates the Gulfstream V for VIP transport

Greece

- Hellenic Air Force operates one Gulfstream V for VIP transport.

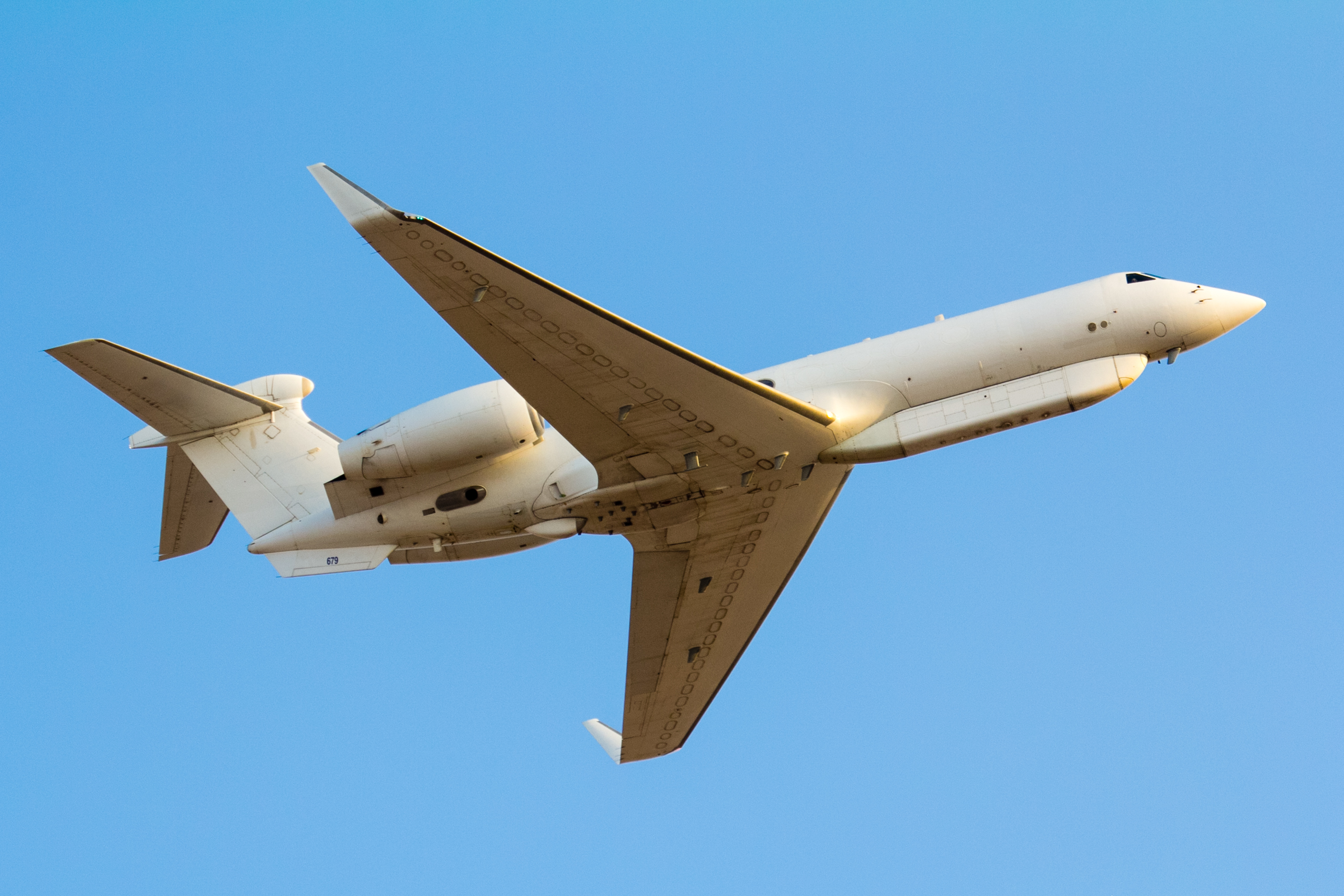
Israeli SEMA Gulfstream G550 inflight

Israel

- A Special Electronic Mission Aircraft (SEMA), based on a highly modified Gulfstream G-V aircraft, was delivered to the Israeli Ministry of Defense in June 2005.

Italy

- Italian Air Force operates two G550-based AEW&C systems (IAI EL/W-2085). The first aircraft was delivered on 19 December 2016. The second aircraft was delivered on 23 January 2018.

Singapore

- Singapore Air Force operates four G550-based AEW&C systems (IAI EL/W-2085).

Japan

- Japan Coast Guard received the sole C-37A on January 17, 2005. Dubbed "Umi Washi" (Sea Eagle), the aircraft will be operated by the JCG for maritime surveillance search and rescue. The second aircraft was delivered in mid-2005.

Kuwait

- The State of Kuwait operates a G-V aircraft in a transport role for the royal family.

Saudi Arabia

- Saudi Arabia operates two GVs in a medevac configuration.

United States

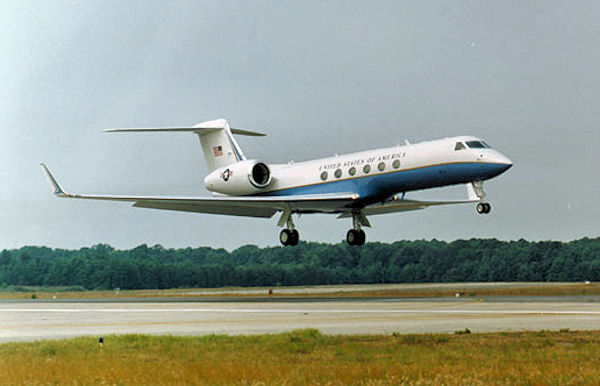
U.S. Air Force C-37A in VIP livery

The 89th Airlift Wing's 99th Airlift Squadron, Andrews Air Force Base, Maryland, operates four C-37As. The 6th Air Mobility Wing's 310th Airlift Squadron, MacDill Air Force Base, Florida operates three C-37As. The 15th Airlift Wing's 65th Airlift Squadron, Hickam Air Force Base, Hawaii operates one C-37A. The 86th Airlift Wing's 76th Airlift Squadron, Ramstein Air Base, Germany has two C-37As. The Executive Transport Detachment Pacific, Hickam Air Force Base, Hawaii operates one C-37A. The United States Army Priority Air Transport Det. (USAPAT), Andrews AFB, MD, operates two C-37As.

On March 11, 2005, Gulfstream delivered an ultra-long-range G-V to the National Center for Atmospheric Research (NCAR). The aircraft—known as the High-performance, Instrumented Airborne Platform for Environmental Research (HIAPER), based in Boulder, Colorado, is being used by environmental and atmospheric scientists from both public and private research facilities. The GV was chosen by NCAR for its exceptionally high cruising altitude, long range, endurance, payload, reliability, and low operating costs, as well as worldwide product support. The HIAPER Gulfstream V is modified to accept wing/pylon mounted instrumentation.

- United States Air Force operates the C-37A as command/executive transport
- United States Army operates the C-37A as command/executive transport; 2 as of January 2025
- United States Marine Corps operates the C-37A as command/executive transport
- United States Navy operates the C-37A as command/executive transport
- United States Coast Guard operates one C-37A and one C-37B for executive transportation of the Secretary of Homeland Security and the Coast Guard Commandant as of June 2022.
- Federal Aviation Administration operates one Gulfstream G-IV with tail number N1.
- Federal Bureau of Investigation & Department of Justice operate one Gulfstream G-V.
- Federal Emergency Management Agency operates one Gulfstream G-V for team transport in disaster response.
- National Center for Atmospheric Research operates one Gulfstream G-V for scientific research.
- The National Aeronautics and Space Administration operates one Gulfstream G-V (N95NA) at the Lyndon B. Johnson Space Center which takes part in research flights as well as to transport NASA astronauts returning from the International Space Station back to the JSC in Houston upon their landing in Kazakhstan.

== Specifications ==
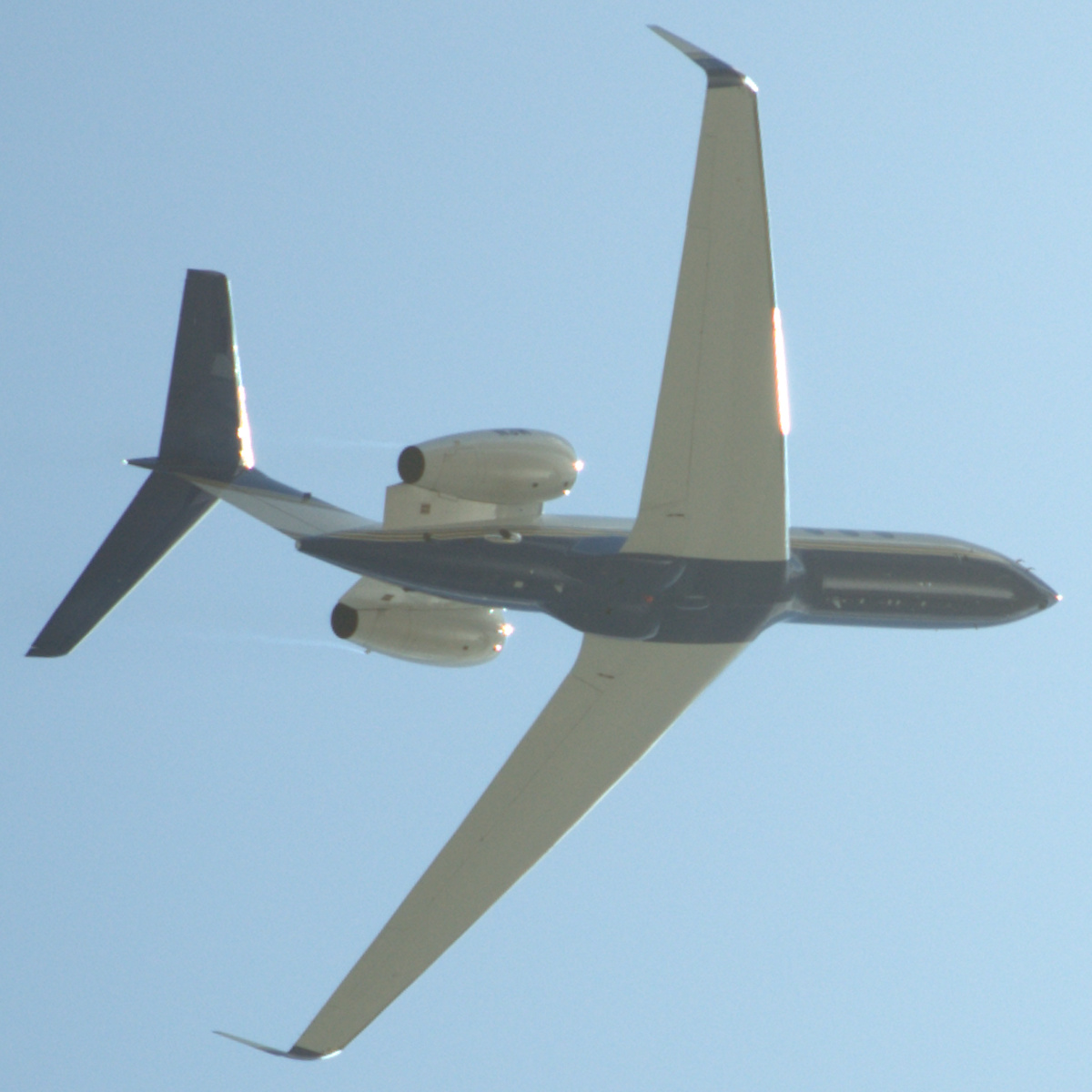
Viewed from below

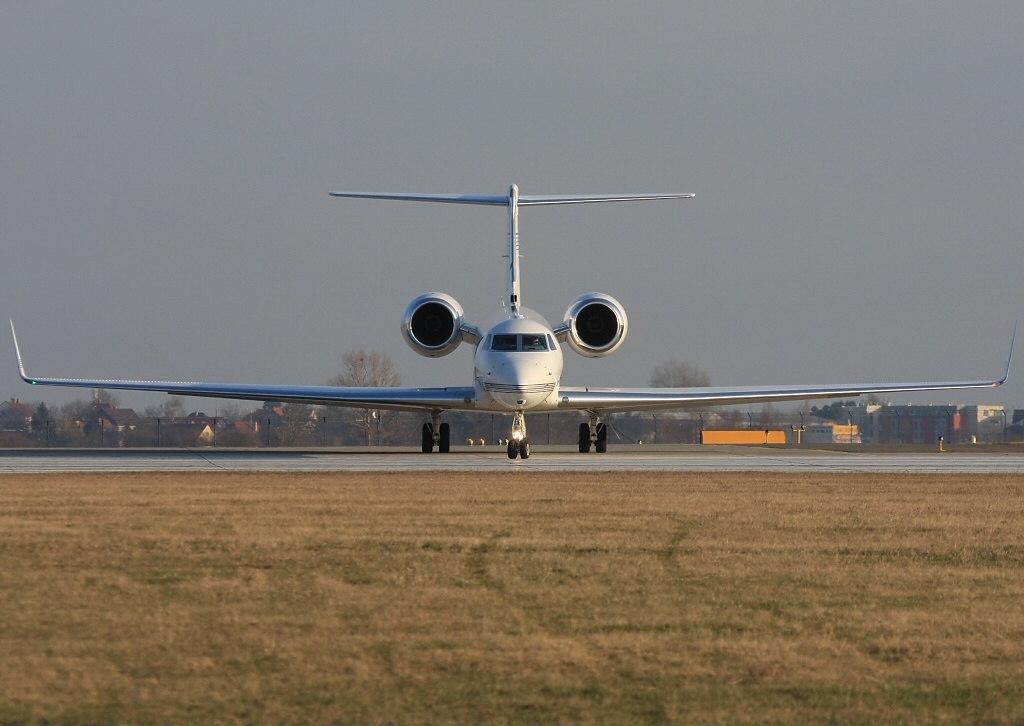
Front view

Data from HIAPER GV Brochure

General characteristics

- Crew: 2
- Capacity: 15–19
- Length: 96.4 ft (29.4 m)
- Wingspan: 93.45 ft (28.48 m)
- Height: 26.85 ft (8.18 m)
- Wing area: 1,137 sq ft (105.6 m^{2})
- Aspect ratio: 7.68
- Empty weight: 46,200 lb (20,956 kg) , Basic Operating Weight with 4 crew : 46,800 pounds (21,228 kg)
- Max takeoff weight: 90,500 lb (41,050 kg)
- Maximum Landing Weight : 75,300 lb (34,200 kg)
- Maximum Zero Fuel Weight : 54,500 lb (24,700 kg)
- Maximum Fuel Load : 41,300 lb (18,700 kg)
- Maximum Payload : 8,300 lb (3,800 kg)
- Payload w/ Max Fuel : 3,400 lb (1,500 kg)
- Cabin Length : 43.92 ft (13.39 m)
- Cabin floor Width : 5.25 ft (1.60 m)
- Cabin Height : 6.17 ft (1.88 m)
- Powerplant: 2 × Rolls-Royce BR710A1-10 turbofan, 14,750 lbf (65.6 kN) thrust each

Performance

- Maximum speed: Mach 0.88
- Range: 7,500 mi (12,000 km, 6,500 nmi) , long range cruise with 4 crew, 8 passengers
- Endurance: 14hr 28min
- Service ceiling: 51,000 ft (16,000 m)
- Cruise speed : Mach 0.83 (476 kn; 548 mph; 882 km/h)
- Normal cruise range : 5,500 nmi (6,329 mi; 10,186 km), with 5 crew, 12 passengers
- Takeoff distance MTOW, ISA, SL : 6,100 ft (1,900 m)
- Climb rate : 4,188 ft/min (21.28 m/s)
- Ceiling : 51,000 ft (16,000 m)

== See also ==
Related development

- Gulfstream IV
- Gulfstream G550

Aircraft of comparable role, configuration, and era

- Airbus Corporate Jets
- Boeing Business Jet
- Bombardier Global Express
- Dassault Falcon 7X
