= Gulfstream Peregrine 600 =

Prototype military trainer aircraft

Peregrine 600
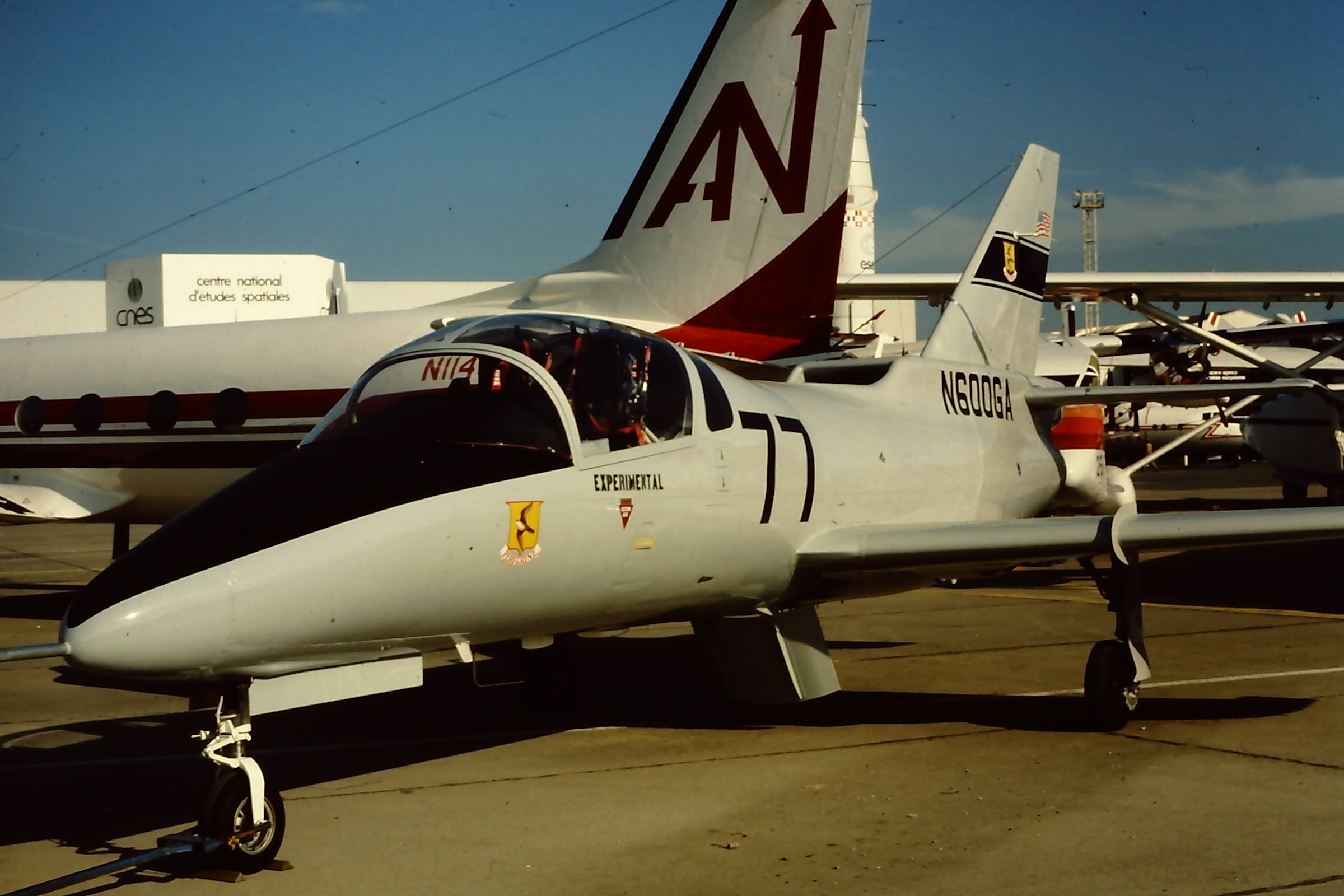
- Peregrine in 1981

General information
- Type: Military jet trainer
- National origin: United States of America
- Manufacturer: Gulfstream American
- Number built: 1

History
- First flight: 22 May 1981
- Developed from: Gulfstream American Hustler
- Developed into: Gulfstream Peregrine

The Gulfstream American Peregrine 600 was a military trainer aircraft developed in the United States in the early 1980s but which did not progress further than prototype stage.

== Design and development ==
Developed from the company's Hustler business aircraft, the Peregrine shared the same wings, empennage and rear fuselage, but had a new forward fuselage with side-by-side seating for the pilot and instructor. The aircraft was developed as a contender in the United States Air Force's Next Generation Trainer program, but was ultimately passed over in favor of the Fairchild T-46. Attempts to market it to (at least) the air forces of Australia, New Zealand, Japan, and China also proved unsuccessful, and the project was canceled in 1985. The wing and rear fuselage design was incorporated in the Gulfstream Aerospace Peregrine business aircraft.

The aircraft was destroyed in a crash shortly after takeoff from Wiley Post Airport on 23 November 1983. The pilot, Bill Lawton, had been forced to eject due to a loss of control.

== Variants ==
Peregrine A
The Peregrine offered with side-by-side seating and a single 2,500 lbf (11 kN) Pratt & Whitney Canada JT15D-4 turbofan.
Peregrine B
The Peregrine offered with tandem seating and two 1,500 lbf (7 kN) Williams WR44 turbofans.

== Specifications (Peregrine A) ==
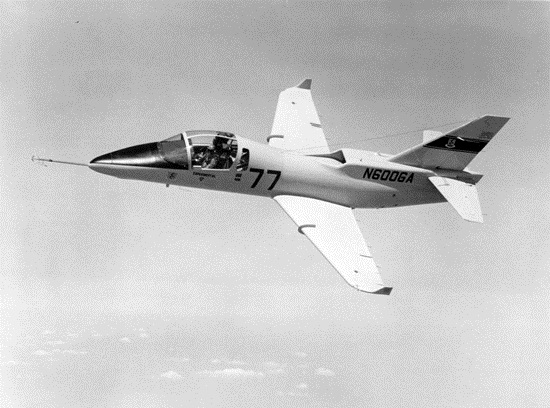
Peregine 600

Data from Jane's All the World's Aircraft 1982–83

General characteristics

- Crew: 2
- Length: 38 ft 4 in (11.68 m)
- Wingspan: 34 ft 5 in (10.5 m)
- Height: 13 ft 5 in (4.09 m)
- Gross weight: 5,254 lb (2,383 kg)
- Max takeoff weight: 6,199 lb (2,812 kg)
- Normal landing weight: 4,402 lb (1,997 kg)
- Powerplant: 1 × Pratt & Whitney Canada JT15D-4 turbofan engine, 2,500 lbf (11.12 kN) thrust

Performance

- Maximum speed: 394 kn (453 mph, 730 km/h) at 20,000 ft (6,100 m)
- Stall speed: 66 kn (76 mph, 122 km/h) power off
- Range: 1,080 nmi (1,240 mi, 2,000 km) at 40,000 ft (12,000 m) and 369 kn (425 mph; 683 km/h)
- Service ceiling: 48,000 ft (15,000 m)
- Rate of climb: 5,200 ft/min (26 m/s) at sea level
- Take-off run to 50 ft (15 m): 489 ft (149 m)
- Landing from 50 ft (15 m): 639 ft (195 m) at normal landing weight

== See also ==
Related development

- Gulfstream American Hustler
- Gulfstream Peregrine
