= Adena Springs =

North American horse breeding operation

Coordinates: 38.224329°N 84.172155°W

- Type: Horse breeding farms & Thoroughbred Racing stables
- Industry: Thoroughbred Horse racing
- Headquarters: 707 Cane Ridge Rd; Paris, Kentucky, United States
- Key people: Frank Stronach
- Divisions: Ocala, Florida, US; Aurora, Ontario, Canada
- Website: http://www.adenastallions.com

Adena Springs is a Thoroughbred horse breeding operation owned by Frank Stronach and his family. The main farm is located in Paris, Kentucky, with satellite locations in Florida and Ontario, Canada. Adena Springs has won the Eclipse Award for Outstanding Breeder eight times, one of which was Stronach winning the award in his own name. Adena Springs has won the Canadian Sovereign Award for Outstanding Breeder eight times, plus four earlier wins under Stronach's own name.

Adena Springs has stood multiple stallions at its various farms since 1996. Their first important stallion was El Prado, who was the leading sire in North America for 2002, and an influential sire of sires, including Medaglia d'Oro and Kitten's Joy, himself the leading sire in 2012. They next expanded their program by adding half-brothers Awesome Again and Macho Uno. As of 2016, the operation stands 18 stallions. In 2013, Adena Springs stood three of the top 15 stallions in the Thoroughbred industry, with stud fees ranging from $3,500 to $75,000 for various stallions.

Adena Springs began as a nursery to produce horses for Stronach Stables. Famous homebreds include Breeders' Cup Classic winner Awesome Again and his best son, Horse of the Year Ghostzapper, both of whom stand at Adena. With the expansion of the farm, Adena is now a major seller of young thoroughbreds. Horses bred and sold by Adena include Game On Dude and Judy the Beauty.

== Organization and history ==
The first Adena Springs location was a 640 acres (260 ha) farm near Versailles, Kentucky, purchased in 1989. The farm was named after the Adena, who were the earliest known inhabitants of the region. Adena Springs Kentucky expanded to its current 2,000 acres (810 ha) facility located in Bourbon County near Paris, Kentucky in 2005.

The Adena Springs South farm is located in Williston, Florida, which is north of Ocala and was established in 1996 when the initial 453 acres (183 ha) were purchased, with an additional 1,050 acres (420 ha) added in 1999. The Florida facility now has 3,800 acres (1,500 ha) and in addition to housing several stallions, it is where the young Thoroughbreds begin their race training.

The Adena Springs North farm is located in Aurora, Ontario, and houses several stallions. It is also home to a retirement program that prepares Thoroughbreds for second careers by retraining them and rehabilitating any injuries they may have. The goal is to place these horses in permanent adoptive homes and as of 2014 over 100 horses had been placed. Horses that are retired from racing but are not suitable for adoption are permanently retired to the Adena facility in Florida. The original concept for opening a stud farm in Canada was to produce horses deemed competitive on the international market. Stronach organized a partnership with Michael Coulterjohn in 2008 and brought Silent Name, a son of Sunday Silence to the facility, as well as Sligo Bay, a son of Sadler's Wells.

Stronach also sometimes leases stallions to stand in other regions across the United States, such as sending Giacomo to Oregon. Adena Springs also sends stallions to stud at other facilities in states where Adena Springs does not have its own farms, such as New York, and Maryland. They also stand stallions at facilities across Canada and in England.

== Stallions ==
Some of the stallions retired to stud at Adena Springs
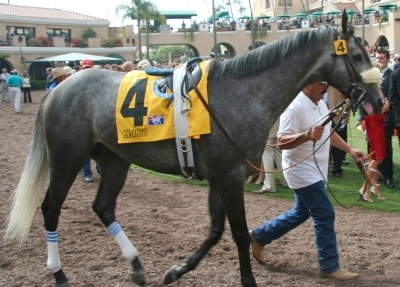
Giacomo

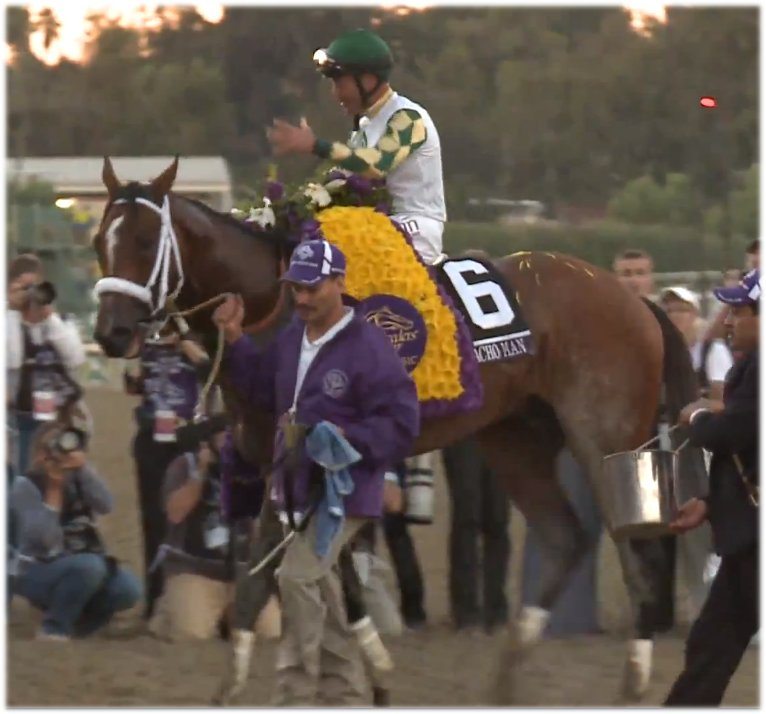
Mucho Macho Man

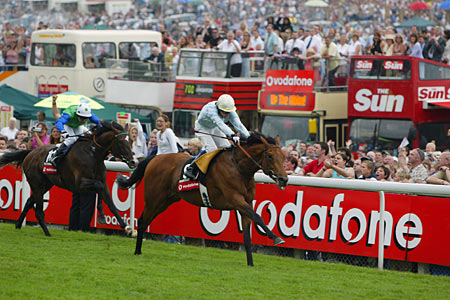
North Light

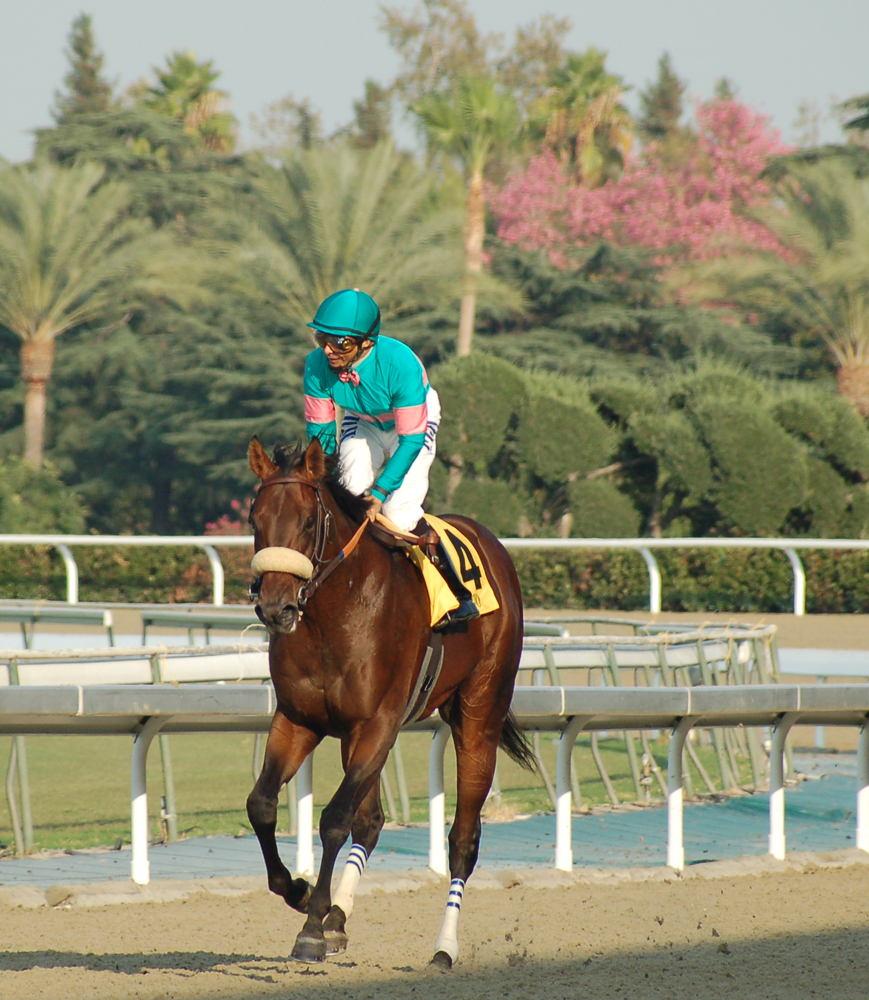
Tiago

Stallions who stand or have stood at Adena Springs

- Alphabet Soup^{‡}
- Awesome Again (Kentucky)
- Capo Bastone (Florida)
- Einstein (California)
- El Prado† (1989-2009)
- Fort Larned (Florida)
- Ghostzapper (Kentucky)
- Giant Gizmo (Canada)
- Giacomo (Oregon)
- Hunter's Bay (Florida)
- Macho Uno (Kentucky)
- Mast Track (California)
- Milwaukee Brew (Canada)
- Mucho Macho Man (Kentucky)
- North Light (Canada)
- Plan
- Point of Entry (Kentucky)
- Rookie Sensation (Canada)
- Silent Name (Canada)
- Silver Max (Canada)
- Singing Saint (Canada(
- Sligo Bay (Canada)
- Tiago† (2004-2015)
- Touch Gold^{‡}
- Wilko (Canada)

†—Horse now deceased
‡-Retired to Old Friends Equine

In February 2014, Adena Springs purchased an undisclosed interest in Mucho Macho Man, who at the time was still racing, and was retired in July of that year. Both his sire, Macho Uno, and his dam, Ponche de Leona, were owned by Adena Springs at the time of mating; the pregnant mare was subsequently purchased by John and Carole Rio of Florida, where Mucho Macho Man was foaled, and thus the Rios are officially listed as his breeders. Stronach, noting that Adena arranged the original mating, described the sale as "a homecoming of sorts."

== See also ==
- Adena Springs Ranch
- Stronach Group
- Stronach Stables
