= Gutenberg, Styria =

Gutenberg
- Municipality
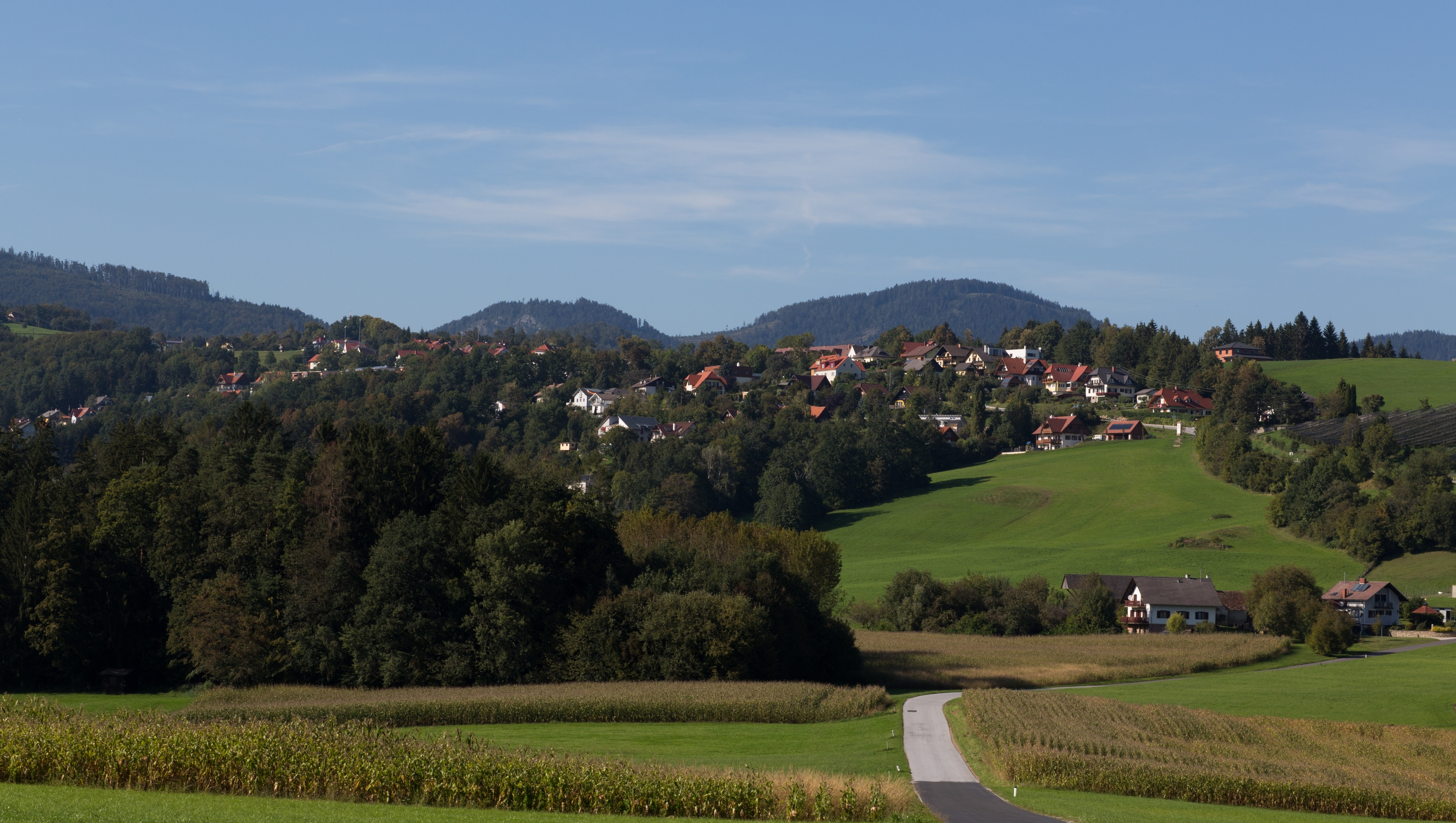

- Coat of arms

- Location within Austria Gutenberg (Austria)
- Coordinates: 47°12′32″N 15°33′47″E
- Country: Austria
- State: Styria
- District: Weiz
- Established: 2015 Gutenberg-Stenzengreith

Government
  - Mayor: Vinzenz Mautner (SPÖ)
- Elevation: 569 m (1,867 ft)

Population (2018-01-01)
  - Total: 1,773
- Time zone: UTC+01:00 (CET)
  - Summer (DST): UTC+02:00 (CEST)
- Postal code: 8061, 8160, 8162
- Area code: +43 3132, 3172
- Vehicle registration: WZ
- Website: gutenberg.gv.at

Gutenberg is a municipality since 2015 in the Weiz District of Styria, Austria. It was created as part of the Styria municipal structural reform, at the end of 2014, by merging the former towns of Gutenberg an der Raabklamm and Stenzengreith and named Gutenberg-Stenzengreith until May 2023.

== Geography ==
=== Municipality arrangement ===
The municipality territory includes the following four sections and like-named Katastralgemeinden (populations and areas as of 2023 resp. 2019):

Katastralgemeinde / Ortschaft	Area	Population 1 Jan 2015
Garrach	1,038.65 ha (2,566.6 acres)	491
Kleinsemmering	415.79 ha (1,027.4 acres)	780
Stenzengreith	575.52 ha (1,422.1 acres)	204
Stockheim	262.03 ha (647.5 acres)	161

== Politics ==
=== Mayor ===
On 27 April 2015, Vinzenz Mautner (SPÖ) was elected mayor. Mautner was clear to see the vote prevail against the former mayor of Gutenberg and the interim government commissioner, Thomas Wild, with 7:8 votes. Thomas Wild had to settle for vice-mayor, and town treasurer as Erwin Neubauer (ÖVP) of the municipality.

=== Town council ===
The municipal council consists of 15 members and convened on the results of the 2020 election as follows:

- 8 Mandatare of ÖVP
- 6 Mandatare of SPÖ
- 1 Mandatar of Die Grünen

The prior elections brought the following results:

Party	2015			2010						2005						2000					
Party	merged town			Gutenberg			Stenzengreith			Gutenberg			Stenzengreith			Gutenberg			Stenzengreith		
Party	Stimmen	%	Mandate	St.	%	M.	St.	%	M.	St.	%	M.	St.	%	M.	St.	%	M.	St.	%	M.
ÖVP	487	41	7	486	58	9	223	57	5	494	58	9	227	60	6	411	55	8	183	52	
SPÖ	401	33	5	354	42	6	78	20	2	294	34	5	95	25	2	240	32	5	116	33	3
FPÖ	132	11	1	not running			92	23	2	not running			55	15	1	50	7	1	53	15	1
Die Grünen	182	15	2	not running			not running			65	8	1	not running			48	6	1	not running		
Wahlbeteiligung	83%			85%			90%			85%			87%			87%			89%		

=== Coat of arms ===

The award of the town crest followed with Wirkung of 1 August 1984 to the town Gutenberg an der Raabklamm. By way of the merger, the crest lost its official validity on 1 January 2015. The new award was on 15 February 2015.
Blazon (crest description):

"In ermine, a black anchor inverted (Wurfparte)“.
