= Stenzengreith =

- Former municipality
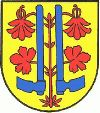
- Coat of arms

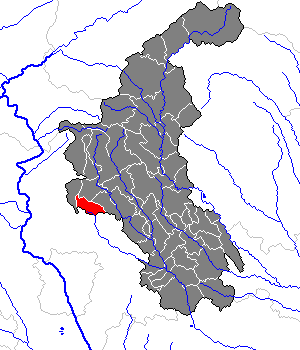
- Location within Weiz district

- Location within Austria
- Coordinates: 47°12′00″N 15°30′36″E
- Country: Austria
- State: Styria
- District: Weiz

Area
  - Total: 13.13 km^{2} (5.07 sq mi)
- Elevation: 988 m (3,241 ft)

Population (1 January 2016)
  - Total: 521
  - Density: 39.7/km^{2} (103/sq mi)
- Time zone: UTC+1 (CET)
  - Summer (DST): UTC+2 (CEST)
- Postal code: 8061, 8160
- Area code: 03132
- Vehicle registration: WZ
- Website: www.stenzengreith.at

Stenzengreith is a former municipality in the district of Weiz in the Austrian state of Styria. Since the 2015 Styria municipal structural reform, it is part of the municipality Gutenberg-Stenzengreith.
