= Sovereign Award for Outstanding Owner =

Horse racing award

The Sovereign Award for Outstanding Owner is a Canadian Thoroughbred horse racing honor. Created in 1975 by the Jockey Club of Canada, it is part of the Sovereign Awards program and is awarded annually to the most successful owner of Thoroughbred horses racing in Canada.

Past winners:

- 1975 : Jack H. Stafford
- 1976 : George R. Gardiner
- 1977 : Bory Margolus
- 1978 : Conn Smythe
- 1979 : Jimmy Shields
- 1980 : Ernie Samuel
- 1981 : Dave Kapchinsky
- 1982 : Kinghaven Farms
- 1983 : Bahnam K. Yousif
- 1984 : Ernie Samuel
- 1985 : Ernie Samuel
- 1986 : Kinghaven Farms
- 1987 : Kinghaven Farms
- 1988 : Ernie Samuel
- 1989 : Kinghaven Farms
- 1990 : Kinghaven Farms
- 1991 : Ernie Samuel
- 1992 : Steve Stavro
- 1993 : Frank Stronach
- 1994 : Frank Stronach
- 1995 : Frank Stronach
- 1996 : Minshall Farms
- 1997 : Frank Stronach
- 1998 : Stronach Stables
- 1999 : Stronach Stables
- 2000 : Sam-Son Farm
- 2001 : Sam-Son Farm
- 2002 : Stronach Stables
- 2003 : Stronach Stables
- 2004 : Sam-Son Farm
- 2005 : Stronach Stables
- 2006 : Sam-Son Farm
- 2007 : Melnyk Racing Stables
- 2008 : Bear Stables, Ltd.
- 2009 : Melnyk Racing Stables
- 2010 : Sam-Son Farm
- 2011 : Donver Stables, Glen Todd & Patrick Kinsella
- 2012 : John C. Oxley
- 2013 : John C. Oxley
- 2014 : John C. Oxley
- 2015 : Sam-Son Farm
- 2016 : Conquest Stables, LLC
- 2017 : Chiefswood Stables Ltd.
- 2018 : Chiefswood Stables Ltd.
- 2019 : Sam-Son Farm
- 2020 : Live Oak Plantation
- 2021 : Live Oak Plantation
- 2022 : Bruno Schickedanz
- 2023 : Gary Barber
- 2024 : Gary Barber
- 2025 : Chiefswood Stables Ltd.
