= Sovereign Award for Outstanding Breeder =

The Sovereign Award for Outstanding Breeder is a Canadian Thoroughbred horse racing honor created in 1975 by the Jockey Club of Canada. It is part of the Sovereign Awards program and is awarded annually to the top breeder whose horse(s) have competed in Thoroughbred races in Canada during the year.

The award's counterpart in the United States is the Eclipse Award for Outstanding Breeder.

Past winners:

- 1975 : Bory Margolus
- 1976 : E. P. Taylor
- 1977 : Conn Smythe
- 1978 : J. Louis Levesque
- 1979 : Kinghaven Farms
- 1980 : Marvin W. Hamilton
- 1981 : Tom Webb
- 1982 : Kinghaven Farms
- 1983 : Russell Bennett
- 1984 : Frank Stronach
- 1985 : E. P. Taylor
- 1986 : Kinghaven Farms
- 1987 : Kinghaven Farms
- 1988 : Ernie Samuel
- 1989 : Kinghaven Farms
- 1990 : Kinghaven Farms
- 1991 : Ernie Samuel
- 1992 : Steve Stavro
- 1993 : Kinghaven Farms
- 1994 : Kinghaven Farms
- 1995 : Kinghaven Farms
- 1996 : Minshall Farms
- 1997 : Frank Stronach
- 1998 : Frank Stronach
- 1999 : Frank Stronach
- 2000 : Sam-Son Farm
- 2001 : Sam-Son Farm
- 2002 : Sam-Son Farm
- 2003 : Sam-Son Farm
- 2004 : Sam-Son Farm
- 2005 : Adena Springs
- 2006 : Adena Springs
- 2007 : Adena Springs
- 2008 : Adena Springs
- 2009 : Eugene Melnyk
- 2010 : Adena Springs
- 2011 : Gardiner Farms Limited
- 2012 : William D Graham
- 2013 : Sam-Son Farm
- 2014 : Sam-Son Farm
- 2015 : Adena Springs
- 2016 : Adena Springs
- 2017 : Adena Springs
- 2018 : Tall Oaks Farm
- 2019 : Sam-Son Farm
- 2020 : Tall Oaks Farm
- 2021 : Sam-Son Farm
- 2022 : Adena Springs
- 2023 : Adena Springs
- 2024 : Adena Springs
- 2025 : Chiefswood Stables Limited
