= Frank Stronach =

Austrian-Canadian industrialist and politician, convicted of indecent assault

Frank Stronach CM
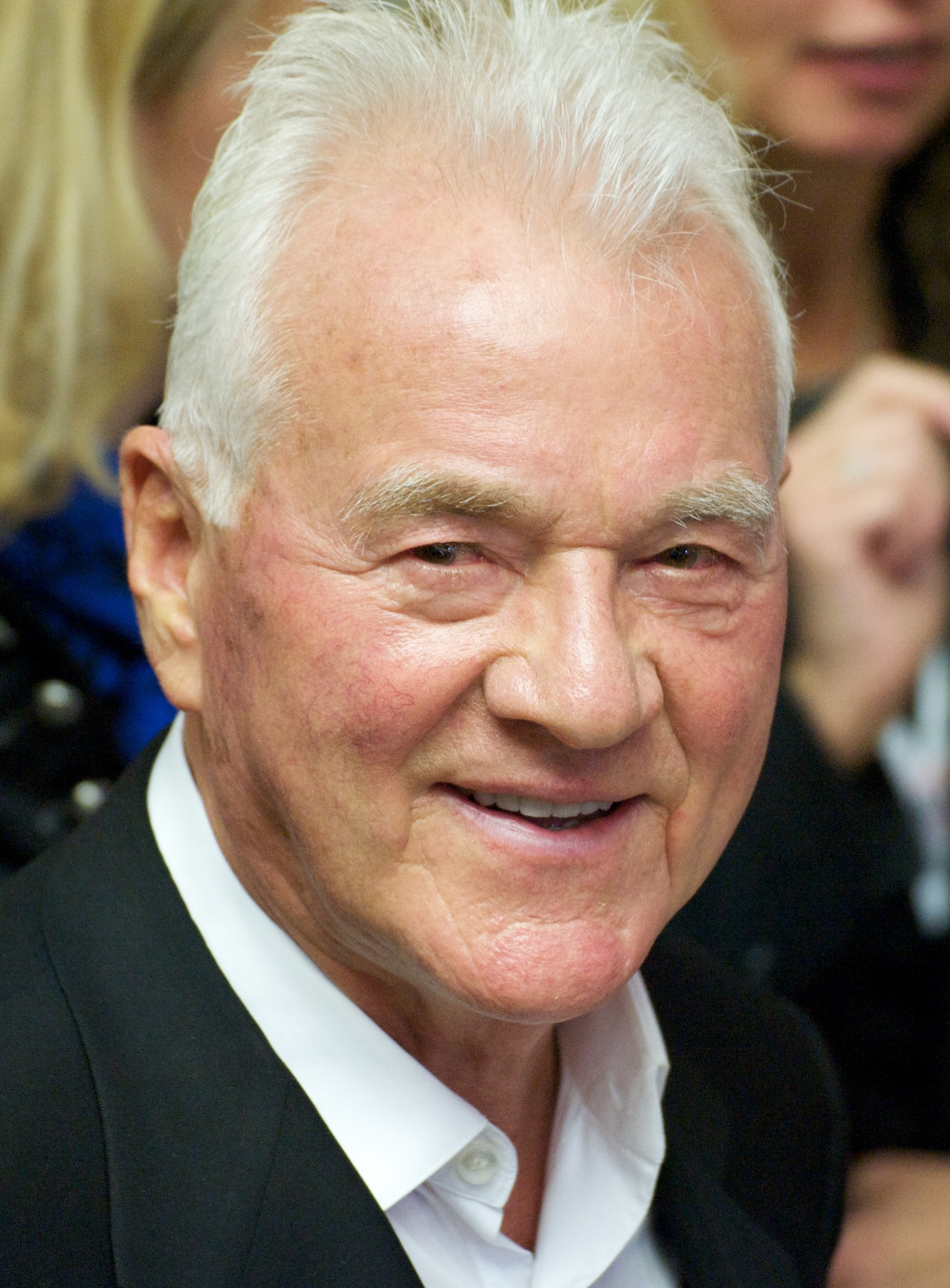
- Stronach in 2013
- Born: Franz Strohsack; 6 September 1932 (age 94); Kleinsemmering, Styria, Austria
- Occupations: Businessman; Racehorse owner/breeder Politician, Austria and Canada
- Criminal charges: indecent assault.
- Spouse: Elfriede Sallmutter (m. 1964; died 2024)
- Children: Belinda, Andrew
- Awards: Order of Canada (1999); Thoroughbred horse racing awards: Sovereign Award for Outstanding Owner (1993, 1994, 1997, 1998, 1999, 2002, 2003, 2005); Sovereign Award for Outstanding Breeder (1997, 1998, 1999); Eclipse Award for Outstanding Owner (1998, 1999, 2000, 2008); Eclipse Award for Outstanding Breeder (2000, 2004, 2005, 2006, 2007, 2008)

Frank Stronach CM (born 6 September 1932) is an Austrian-Canadian billionaire businessman and politician. He was convicted of indecent assault.

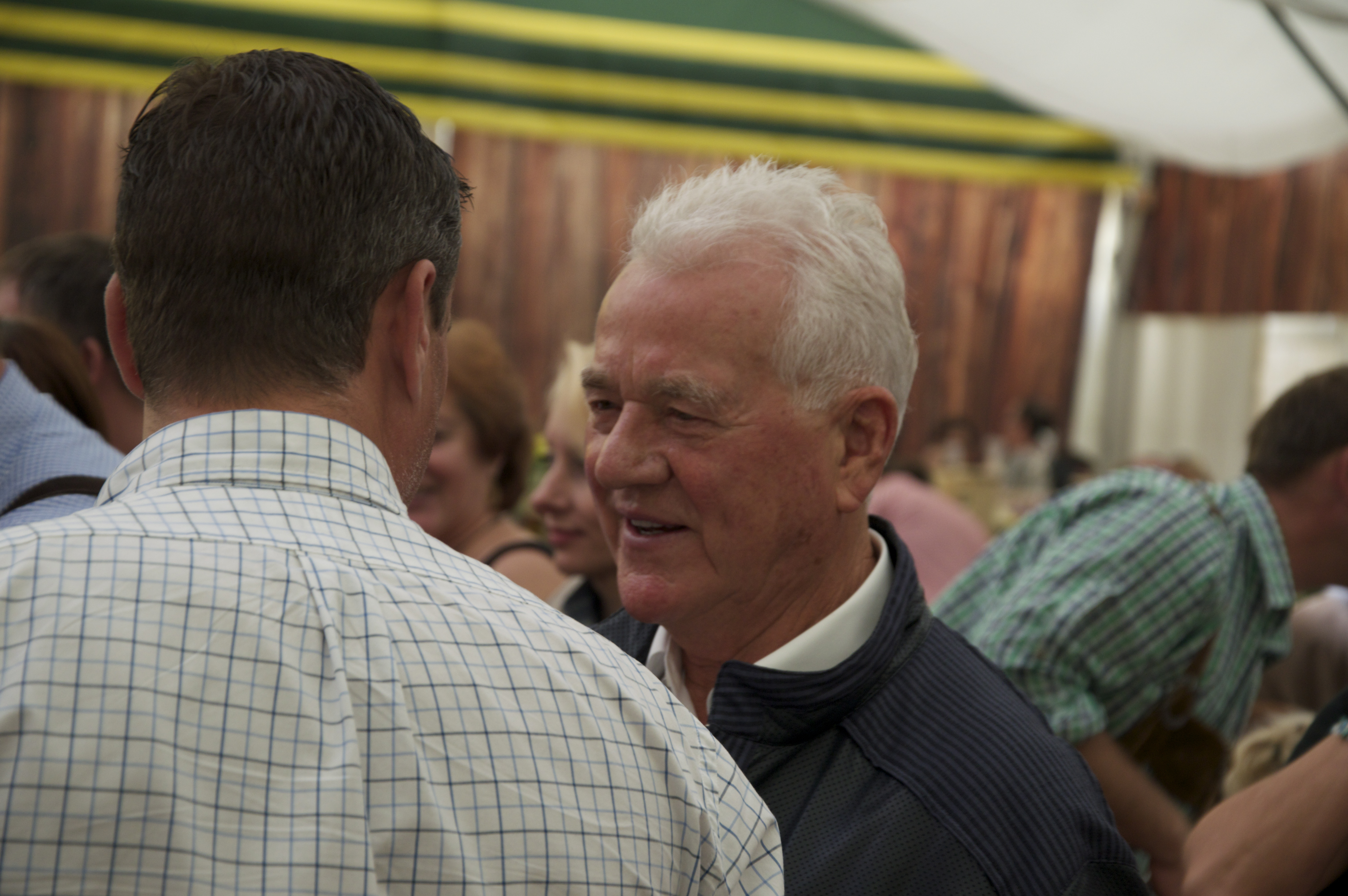
Frank Stronach, September 2013

He is the founder of Magna International, an international automotive parts company based in Aurora, Ontario, Canada; Granite Real Estate, and the Stronach Group. With an estimated net worth of $C3.06 billion (as of December 2017), Stronach was ranked by Canadian Business as the 31st richest Canadian.

In 2011, he entered Austrian politics, founding the Stronach Institute to campaign for a flat tax and lowering national debt. In 2012, he founded the political party Team Stronach for Austria.

In 2026, Stronach was found guilty of sexual assault and indecent assault in Canada for incidents that happened in the 1970s and 1980s.. A second trial is scheduled for May 2027 in Newmarket, representing multiple charges from six further complainants.

== Early life ==
Stronach was born Franz Strohsack in Kleinsemmering, Styria, Austria, to working-class parents of Croatian heritage. He married Elfriede Sallmutter, a fellow Austrian. She died in Canada on March 25, 2024 at the age of 80. Belinda Stronach, a former MP and CEO of Magna, is their daughter, and Andrew Stronach, who is involved in Adena Springs Farms' Thoroughbred horse breeding. His grandchildren include electronic musician Frank Walker.

== Business career ==
In 1956, Stronach started his first business, Multimatic Investments Ltd in Toronto. In 1969, his firm acquired its first automotive parts contract and merged with Magna Electronics. In 1973, the company's name was changed from Multimatic Investments Ltd. to Magna International Ltd. He resigned as chairman of the board in May 2011 after approval of a $863-million (U.S.) deal to buy out the multiple voting shares with which he controlled the company. He no longer plays any role in the company.

In 2020, the Stronachs settled a 2018 lawsuit against their daughter Belinda, their grandchildren Nicole and Frank Walker, and Alon Ossip for failure to honour commitments regarding the management of The Stronach Group (TSG)'s management of racing horses and gambling, from which Stronach resigned in 2013 when he ran for office in Austria. As part of the settlement, Stronach and Elfriede will assume full control and ownership of a stallion and breeding business, all farm operations in North America, and all European assets. Belinda Stronach retains full control of The Stronach Group's horse racing, gaming, real estate and related assets.

Other ventures by Stronach over the years include the "As Prime Minister, I Would…" symposium, the Fair Enterprise Institute think tank, the business magazine Vista, Frank's Energy Drink, and the beef ranch operations of Adena Farms.

== Thoroughbred horse racing ==
In 2011, Stronach along with his daughter Belinda Stronach, founded The Stronach Group, a horse racing, entertainment and pari-mutuel wagering technology company. The Stronach Group horse racing industry brands include; Santa Anita Park, "The Great Race Place"; Pimlico Race Course, home of the Preakness Stakes; Gulfstream Park, one of Florida's entertainment destination centers, and home to the $16-million Pegasus World Cup Invitational, the world's richest Thoroughbred horse race; Laurel Park; Golden Gate Fields; Portland Meadows; and Rosecroft Raceway. The Stronach Group is in pari-mutuel technology through its subsidiaries AmTote and Xpressbet and is a distributor of horse racing content to audiences through Monarch Content Management. A settlement to the lawsuit launched by Stronach on October 1, 2018, was announced on August 13, 2020. As part of the settlement, Stronach assumes full control and ownership of a stallion and breeding business, all farm operations in North America, and all European assets while Belinda Stronach retains full control of The Stronach Group's horse racing, gaming, real estate and related assets. Stronach no longer plays a role in The Stronach Group. Among his early successes was his partnership with Nelson Bunker Hunt in the filly Glorious Song who was received the 1980 Sovereign Award for Canadian Horse of the Year.

His horses have won the Queen's Plate in 1994 and 1997, the Belmont Stakes in 1997, and the Preakness Stakes in 2000. His horse Ghostzapper won several major races including the 2004 Breeders' Cup Classic, was voted the Eclipse Award for Horse of the Year, and named the World's Top Ranked Horse for 2004. In Canada, Stronach and/or his Stronach Stables has won the Sovereign Award for Outstanding Owner nine times. In the United States, he earned the Eclipse Award for Outstanding Owner in 1998, 1999, and 2000. In 2000, he won the Eclipse Award for Outstanding Breeder. He subsequently established Adena Springs Farms which owns horse breeding farms in Kentucky, Florida, and Canada and have won the Eclipse Award for Outstanding Breeder in 2004, 2005 and 2006.

== Politics ==
In the 1988 Canadian federal election, Stronach was the Liberal candidate in York—Simcoe, receiving 35% of the vote to place second to Progressive Conservative winner John E. Cole. In 2011, Stronach entered Austrian politics, proposing the establishment of a new political party: a "Citizens' Alliance" advocating tax, health, and education reform. In November 2011, he called for an 'intellectual revolution' in Austria, suggesting that he would be willing to fund a student-led political party.

Stronach's plans to form a party gained prominence in 2012. He called for a flat tax of 20%, a reduction in bureaucracy by 10% over five years, and a balanced budget. Stronach argued that Austria should stay in the EU, but that the euro was a 'monstrosity'. His program was compared to the Alliance for the Future of Austria (BZÖ); Stronach had admired the BZÖ's leader Josef Bucher as the only politician in Austria that represented economic liberalism. That led to suggestions that Stronach would take over the BZÖ ahead of the 2013 elections so as to give his movement seats in Parliament.

The party, called Team Stronach, was launched in September 2012. Four MPs – Gerhard Köfer of the Social Democratic Party, Elisabeth Kaufmann-Bruckberger of the BZÖ and independents Robert Lugar and Erich Tadler agreed to join the party. The endorsement of at least three members of the National Council was required for a party to compete in general elections (alternatively, a quorum of 2,600 signatures in support of the party's candidacy have to be collected).

== Hurricane Katrina ==
On September 6, 2005, Stronach announced that he and Magna International were committing $2 million to start a model community for people displaced by Hurricane Katrina. The Toronto Star reported that "Magna Entertainment Corp. (a gambling and racing business once the world’s largest owner of race tracks) is providing housing for about 260 evacuees from the New Orleans area at a racetrack training facility in Palm Beach County, Florida and will move them to a new community in November. Auto-parts giant Magna International Inc. and MEC are scouting for about 500 to 1,000 acres (2 to 4 km^{2}) in an area of Baton Rouge, Louisiana to set up trailers and infrastructure. We "would like to build a small community where we would try to be sponsors for the next five to seven years", Stronach said in an interview with The Star.

== Honours awarded ==
In 1999, Stronach was made a Member of the Order of Canada. In 2010, Stronach received the Gold Medal of Honor with Star for Services to the Republic of Austria.. Stronach became a member of the Automotive Hall of Fame in 2018 He received the Founders Award from the Fraser Institute in 2011, and the International Schumpeter Prize from the Schumpeter Society in 2010.

Stronach has received multiple honorary degrees: Honorary Doctor of Business Administration from Laurentian University in 2011, Honorary Doctor of Management from Kettering University in 1997, Honorary Doctor of Commerce from Saint Mary's University in 1995, Honorary Doctor of Laws from Cape Breton University in 1994, Honorary Doctor from University of Haifa in 1994. In 2023, University of Toronto Scarborough made Stronach an "Executive in Residence."

== Honours revoked ==
Following his conviction for sexual assault, multiple organizations revoked Frank Stronach's honours, including the Automotive Hall of Fame, Aurora Sports Hall of Fame, Southlake Health's Frank Stronach Cancer Centre was renamed the Magna Cancer Centre, the city of Newmarket, Ontario has renamed "Frank Stronach Park", "Veterans Park", Aurora, Ontario has stripped Stronach's name from its Aurora Recreation Complex. At Stronach's sentencing hearing in September 2026, Stronach's defense attorney announced that the Automotive Hall of Fame was revoking his induction.

== Rape and sexual assault charges ==
In 2024, Stronach was charged with 13 offenses including rape, indecent assault on a female, eight counts of sexual assault and one of forcible confinement, involving 10 alleged victims. Police allege that the sexual assaults spanned from the 1970s to 2023. His counsel Brian Greenspan said that Stronach denied all the accusations in at least 18 pending sexual assault complaints. Stronach also faces a civil suit from Jane Boon, who alleges he sexually assaulted her when she was a teen co-op student working at Magna in 1986. His charges were separated into two trials, one which began February 2026 The second trial is scheduled for May 2027 in Newmarket.

In early February 2026, the first trial, which had been anticipated to take four weeks, was delayed following allegations by the defense that some of the complainants may have been coached by the Crown. The first trial concluded in April 2026, and on June 19, 2026, Stronach was found guilty of indecent assault and sexual assault. Justice Molloy described Stronach's actions as "gross and disgusting conduct." There were no findings that the complainants had been coached. On July 17, 2026, when one of the complainants sought a private, financial settlement from Stronach citing facts at odds with her testimony at trial, Justice Molloy declared a mistrial for that complainant. On August 17, 2026 the Crown sought an appeal on the mistrial, so that the guilty verdict on Stronach's sexual assault charge would be restored.
