= Gutenberg an der Raabklamm =

- Former municipality
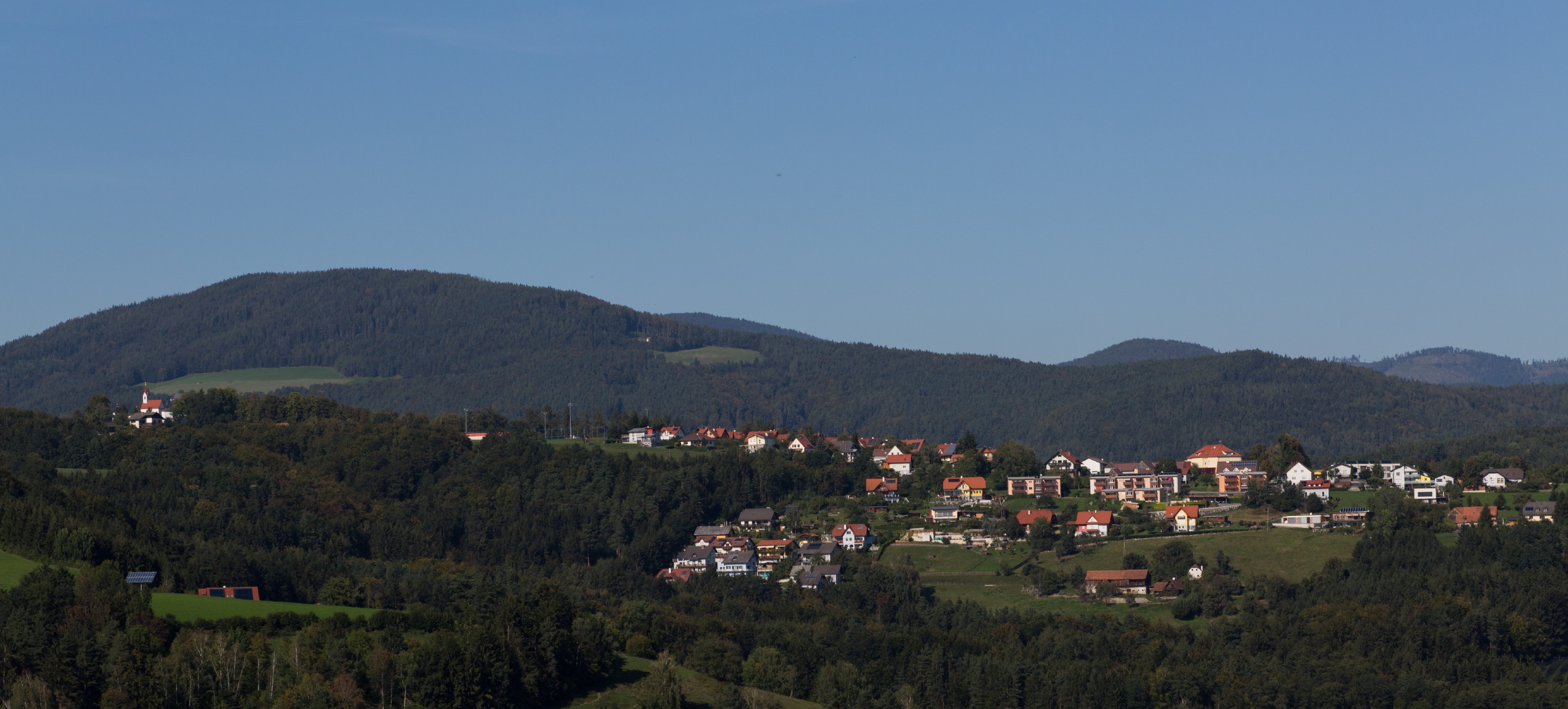

- Coat of arms

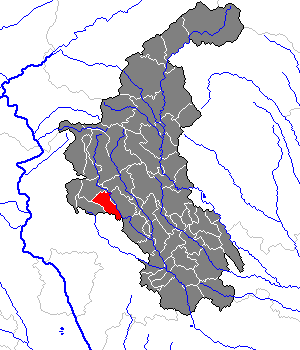
- Location within Weiz district

- Location within Austria Gutenberg an der Raabklamm (Austria)
- Coordinates: 47°12′36″N 15°31′48″E
- Country: Austria
- State: Styria
- District: Weiz

Area
  - Total: 14.51 km^{2} (5.60 sq mi)
- Elevation: 569 m (1,867 ft)

Population (1 January 2016)
  - Total: 1,234
  - Density: 85.04/km^{2} (220.3/sq mi)
- Time zone: UTC+1 (CET)
  - Summer (DST): UTC+2 (CEST)
- Postal code: 8160
- Area code: 03172
- Vehicle registration: WZ
- Website: www.gutenberg-raabklamm.gv.at

Gutenberg an der Raabklamm is a former municipality in the district of Weiz in the Austrian state of Styria. Since the 2015 Styria municipal structural reform, it is part of the municipality Gutenberg-Stenzengreith.
