= Eclipse Award for Outstanding Breeder =

Eclipse Award for Outstanding Breeder is an American Thoroughbred horse racing honor for breeders. Created in 1971, it is part of the Eclipse Awards program and is awarded annually.

Its Canadian counterpart is the Sovereign Award for Outstanding Breeder.

Past winners:

- 1971 : Paul Mellon
- 1972 : C. T. Chenery
- 1973 : C. T. Chenery
- 1974 : John W. Galbreath
- 1975 : Fred W. Hooper
- 1976 : Nelson Bunker Hunt
- 1977 : E. P. Taylor
- 1978 : Harbor View Farm
- 1979 : Claiborne Farm
- 1980 : Adele W. Paxson
- 1981 : Golden Chance Farm
- 1982 : Fred W. Hooper
- 1983 : E. P. Taylor
- 1984 : Claiborne Farm
- 1985 : Nelson Bunker Hunt
- 1986 : Paul Mellon
- 1987 : Nelson Bunker Hunt
- 1988 : Ogden Phipps
- 1989 : North Ridge Farm
- 1990 : Calumet Farm
- 1991 : John & Betty Mabee
- 1992 : William S. Farish III
- 1993 : Allen E. Paulson
- 1994 : William T. Young
- 1995 : Juddmonte Farms
- 1996 : Farnsworth Farms
- 1997 : John & Betty Mabee
- 1998 : John & Betty Mabee
- 1999 : William S. Farish III
- 2000 : Frank Stronach
- 2001 : Juddmonte Farms
- 2002 : Juddmonte Farms
- 2003 : Juddmonte Farms
- 2004 : Adena Springs Farms
- 2005 : Adena Springs Farms
- 2006 : Adena Springs Farms
- 2007 : Adena Springs Farms
- 2008 : Adena Springs Farms
- 2009 : Juddmonte Farms
- 2010 : Adena Springs Farms
- 2011 : Adena Springs Farms
- 2012 : Darley Stud
- 2013 : Kenneth and Sarah Ramsey
- 2014 : Kenneth and Sarah Ramsey
- 2015 : Zayat Stables
- 2016 : WinStar Farm
- 2017 : Clearsky Farms
- 2018 : John D. Gunther
- 2019 : George Strawbridge Jr.
- 2020 : WinStar Farm
- 2021 : Godolphin
- 2022 : Godolphin
- 2023 : Godolphin
- 2024 : Godolphin
- 2025 : Godolphin
