= Gulfstream American Hustler =

American mixed-power executive aircraft

Hustler

General information
- Type: Executive or utility aircraft
- Manufacturer: American Jet Industries/Gulfstream American
- Designer: Allen Paulson
- Status: Suspended
- Number built: 1

History
- First flight: January 11, 1978
- Retired: 1981
- Developed into: Gulfstream Peregrine 600

The Gulfstream American Hustler was a 1970s American mixed-power executive/utility aircraft designed by American Jet Industries, which later changed to Gulfstream American Corporation. The aircraft had a nose-mounted turboprop and a tail-mounted turbofan.

== Development ==
In 1974, Allen Paulson began to develop the Hustler, which was a corporate aircraft that featured a propeller in front for short runway use, and a jet in back for high-altitude cruising. He piloted the first test flight.

American Jet Industries was to produce a seven-seat executive transport, powered by a Pratt & Whitney PT6 turboprop engine in the nose supplemented by a Williams Research Corporation WR19-3-1 turbofan mounted in the tail. It was originally intended that the Hustler would be certified as a single-engined aircraft because the Williams turbofan had not been certified for use as an aircraft propulsion unit. The turbofan, if certified, was to be a standby emergency power unit that could also be used if extra thrust was needed for take-off. But the company, by then renamed Gulfstream American, decided it should be approved as a twin-engined aircraft, and the Williams turbofan was replaced with a Pratt & Whitney Canada JT15D turbofan. To enable the new engine to be fitted a 2 ft 8 in (0.81 m) extension to the forwards fuselage was implemented, allowing the cabin entrance door to be moved in front of the wing, and other aerodynamic changes were made. The intake for the jet engine was also moved from the lower rear fuselage to the base of the fin.

On October 24, 1975, Paulson unveiled the Hustler 400 to the public. Its primary selling points were its fuel economy and exceptional service ceiling for its day. There were technical problems that took more time and money that Paulson had anticipated. He tried to solve these problems in 1977. At one point, he had 76 refundable deposits for the Hustler 500.

The prototype, designated Hustler 400, first flew on January 11, 1978, but never entered production. The Hustler was a low-wing cantilever monoplane with retractable tricycle landing gear, and a high-mounted tailplane.

Gulfstream American Corporation, a company formed by Allen Paulson, acquired the Grumman-American Division for $32 million and $20.5 million in preferred stock. Grumman American, was a subsidiary of the Grumman Aerospace Corporation, that manufactured and sold the Gulfstream II executive aircraft. Paulson's Gulfstream American Corporation manufactured the Gulfstream American Hustler.

Another change was made to the Hustler in 1979, when the front engine was replaced by a Garrett TPE331 turboprop, and the aircraft was re-designated the Hustler 500. The aircraft was flown in this configuration in 1981; however the program was suspended due to a recession in the general aviation market. Elements of the design were used in the prototype Peregrine 600 jet trainer.

== Variants ==
Hustler 400
Prototype mixed-power aircraft with a Pratt & Whitney Canada PT6A-41 in the nose.
Hustler 500
Modified aircraft with a Garrett TPE331 Turboprop in the nose.

== Specifications (Hustler 500 - performance estimated) ==
Data from Jane's All the World's Aircraft 1980–81

General characteristics

- Crew: One
- Capacity: 5–7 passengers
- Length: 41 ft 3 in (12.57 m)
- Wingspan: 34 ft 5 in (10.49 m)
- Height: 13 ft 2 1/2 in (4.03 m)
- Wing area: 190.71 sq ft (17.72 m^{2})
- Airfoil: GAW Mod. 4
- Empty weight: 5,430 lb (2,463 kg)
- Max takeoff weight: 10,000 lb (4,536 kg)
- Fuel capacity: 483 US gal (402 imp gal; 1,830 L)
- Powerplant: 1 × Garrett TPE331-10-501 turboprop , 900 shp (670 kW)
- Powerplant: 1 × Pratt & Whitney Canada JT15D-1 turbofan , 2,200 lbf (9.8 kN) thrust
- Propellers: 4-bladed Hartzell metal constant-speed, reversible-pitch propeller, 7 ft 8 1/2 in (2.35 m) diameter

Performance

- Maximum speed: 400 kn (460 mph, 740 km/h) at 25,000 ft (7,600 m) (max cruise)
- Cruise speed: 350 kn (400 mph, 650 km/h) at 38,000 ft (12,000 m) (normal cruise)
- Stall speed: 79 kn (91 mph, 146 km/h)
- Range: 2,000 nmi (2,300 mi, 3,700 km) (normal cruise speed), 2,400 nmi (2,800 mi; 4,400 km) with one-engined cruise
- Service ceiling: 38,000 ft (12,000 m)
- Rate of climb: 3,450 ft/min (17.5 m/s)
- Takeoff run to 50 ft (15 m): 1,745 ft (532 m)
- Landing run from 50 ft (15 m): 1,600 ft (490 m) (with propeller reversal)
