= Gulfstream Aerospace =

American aircraft company

Gulfstream Aerospace Corporation
- Type: Subsidiary
- Predecessor: Grumman Aerospace Corporation
- Founded: 1958; 68 years ago
- Headquarters: Savannah, Georgia, United States
- Area served: Worldwide
- Key people: Mark Burns (president); Amy Ariano (Senior Vice President, CPO); Jeannine Haas (Senior Vice President, CMO); Lor Izzard (Senior Vice President, Customer Support); John Kenan (Senior Vice President, Operations); Scott Neal (Vice President, Worldwide Sales); Anthony Newlin (Senior Vice President, CIO); Courtney Valentine (Senior Vice President, General Counsel); Tim Waterman (Senior Vice President, CFO); Derek Zimmerman (Senior Vice President, Enterprise Supply Chain Management)
- Products: Jet business aircraft
- Number of employees: 19,000+
- Parent: General Dynamics
- Website: www.gulfstream.com

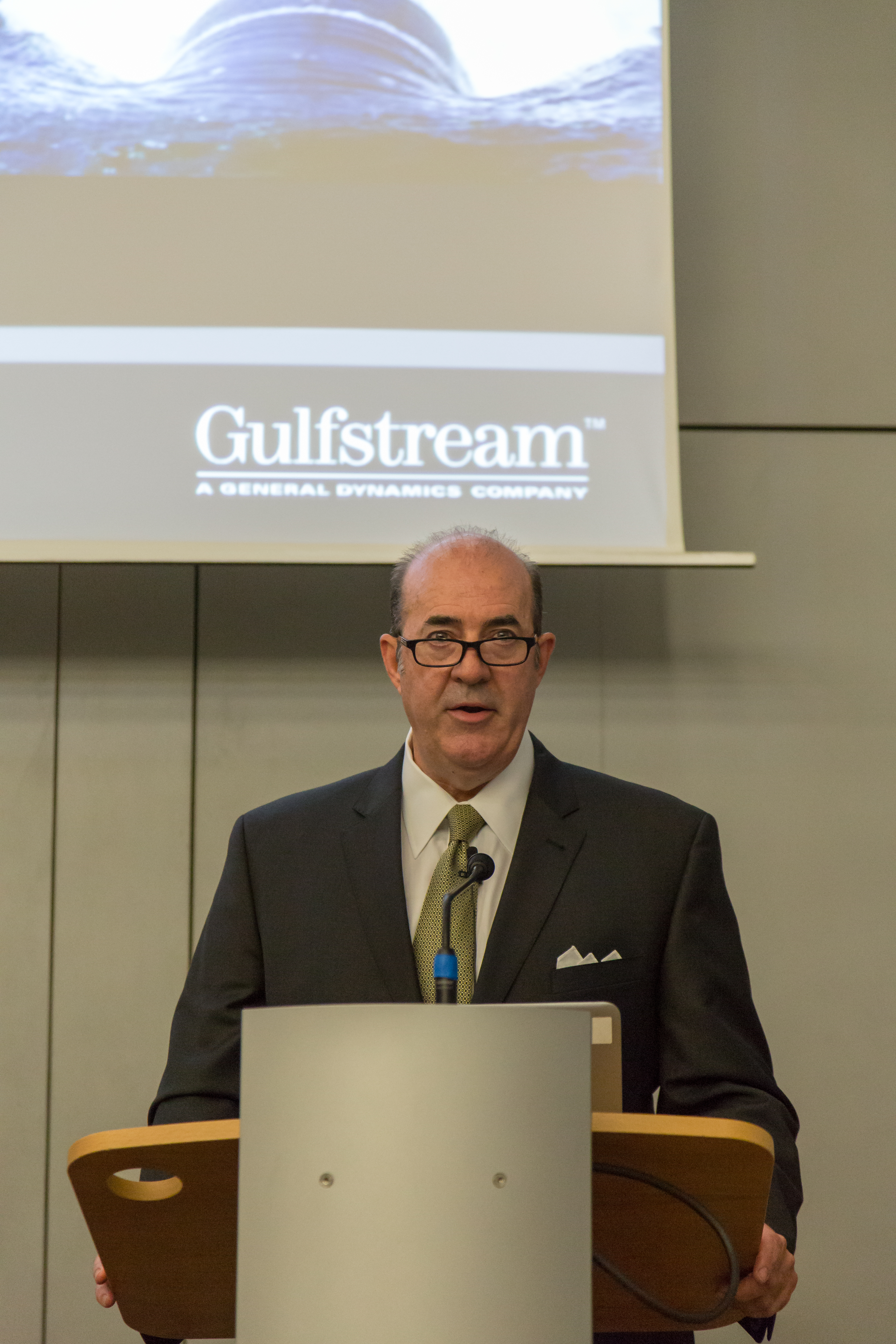
President Mark L. Burns

Gulfstream Aerospace Corporation is an American aircraft company and a subsidiary of General Dynamics. Gulfstream designs, develops, manufactures, markets, and services business jet aircraft. Gulfstream has produced more than 2,000 aircraft since 1958. Gulfstream's aircraft consist of the G280, G400, Gulfstream G400/G500/G600, and Gulfstream G650/G700/G800.

== History ==
=== Origins ===
The company that evolved into Gulfstream Aerospace Corp. started in the late 1950s when Grumman Aircraft Engineering Co., known for military aircraft production, developed a twin turboprop business aircraft at its facilities in Bethpage, New York, called the Grumman Gulfstream I (G-I). The G-I could seat 12 passengers, had a maximum speed of 350 mph (560 km/h) at 25,000 feet (7,620 m) and a range of 2,200 miles (3,540 km). The new aircraft, the first of its kind designed for business travel, was a success, prompting Grumman to develop the jet-powered Grumman Gulfstream II or GII.

=== 1960s ===
At the start of the GII program, Grumman officials separated the company's civil and military aircraft production to improve efficiency. In 1966, they relocated the civilian component to Savannah, Georgia where they had found a supply of skilled labor, an airfield adjacent to the plant and room for expansion. Transportation facilities suitable for heavy equipment and machinery as well as weather favorable to year-round flight-testing and flight-training operations enhanced Savannah's appeal. The new building opened in June 1967 and was dedicated on September 29, 1967. It housed production and flight testing for the GII. The 100-person work force that built the GII was 90% local, and grew to over 1,700 within a few years. On May 4, 1968, the Gulfstream II carved its name into aviation history as the first business jet to fly nonstop from the U.S. to Europe, launching a new era where executives could fly across North America or the Atlantic Ocean non-stop.

=== 1970s ===
On January 2, 1973, Grumman merged its civil aircraft operations with light-aircraft manufacturer American Aviation Corporation. The 256th and final GII delivery took place in 1977. One year later, the Gulfstream line and the Savannah plant were sold to American Jet Industries, which was headed by entrepreneur Allen Paulson. Paulson became the president and CEO of the company, renaming it Gulfstream American. He made a priority of developing the Gulfstream III. The GIII was a new aircraft designed to achieve greater range and speed than the GII. The GIII made its first flight in December 1979, with the first delivery in 1980. It was the first business jet designed to fly over both poles. The Hustler 400 was a corporate aircraft that featured a propeller in front for short runway use, and a jet in back for high-altitude cruising. The prototype, designated Hustler 400, first flew on January 11, 1978, but never entered production.

=== 1980s ===
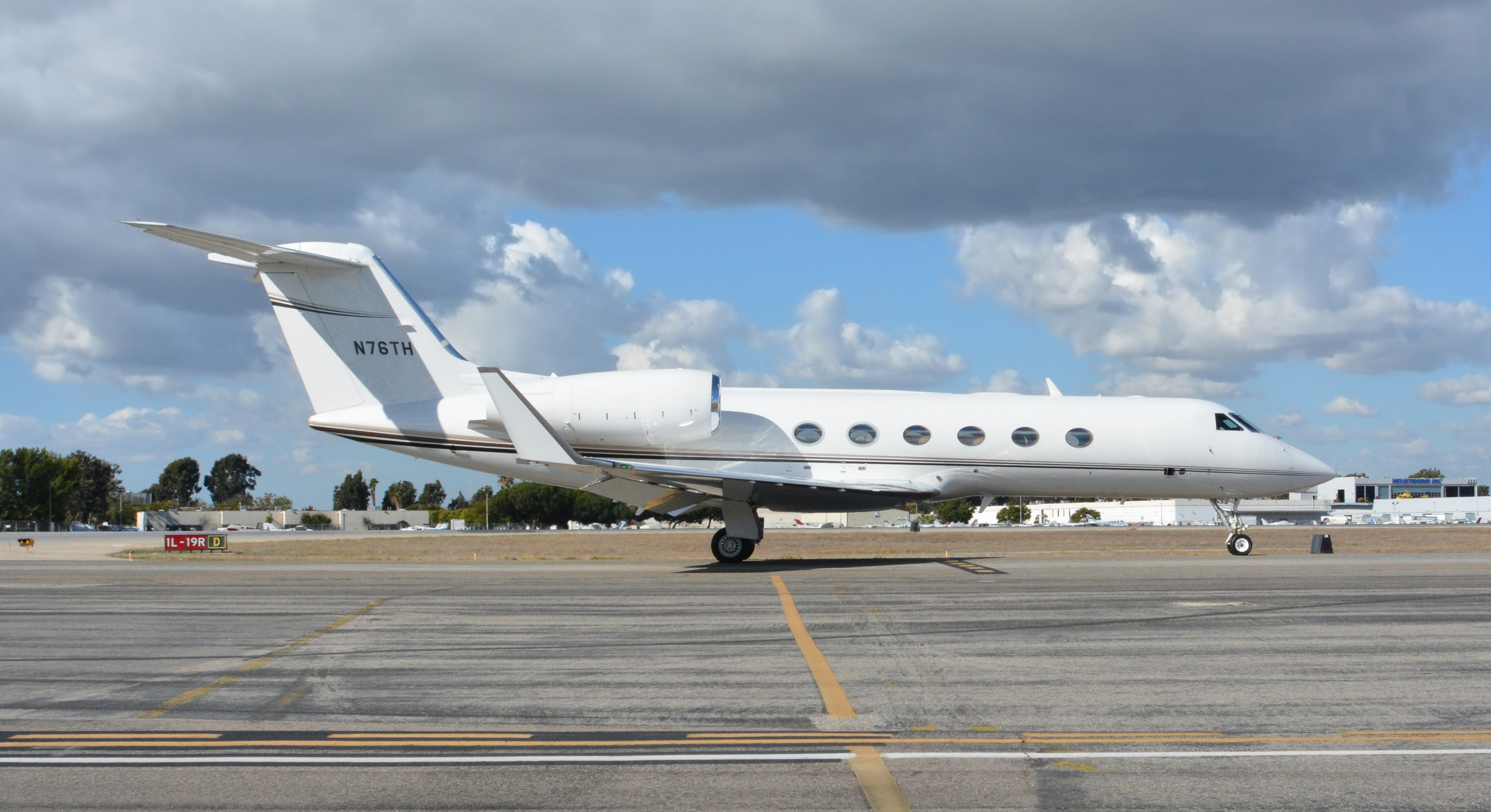
2004 Gulfstream G450 on ramp

In 1981, Gulfstream introduced the Gulfstream GIIB. The GIIB had a modified GII fuselage and the GIII wings, complete with winglets. The variant offered weight and performance characteristics similar to the GIII, but with the shorter GII fuselage. Gulfstream completed and delivered approximately 40 GIIBs.

Under Paulson the Savannah work force grew to 2,500 by the spring of 1982. Also in this year, the company's name changed to Gulfstream Aerospace Corporation to reflect its worldwide scope, and a new plane, the Gulfstream IV, was conceived. The following year, Gulfstream offered 8.8 million shares of stock to the public. In 1985, Chrysler Corp. acquired Gulfstream for $637 million as part of the automaker's plan to diversify into high-tech industries. This was also the year that Gulfstream first appeared on the Fortune 500 list, at No. 417. Two years later, the 200th and last Gulfstream III was delivered, and the first delivery of a Gulfstream IV took place. The GIV was the first jet in business aviation to have an all-glass cockpit. In 1989 Chrysler decided to sell Gulfstream, and Paulson teamed with Forstmann Little & Co. – a private equity firm specializing in leveraged buyouts – and bought Gulfstream back.

=== 1990s ===
The decade that followed the 1989 repurchase was a time of significant advancements for Gulfstream. The company signed a five-year contract with NetJets in 1994. It completed the Gulfstream V Integration Test Facility and rolled out the GV – the first ultra-long range business jet – in 1995. The opening of a $16 million Savannah service center with 136,000 square feet (12,630 m^{2}) of hangar space followed in 1996. In 1997, Gulfstream began the simultaneous manufacture of two aircraft models – the GIV-SP and the GV. Within a few months of the GV's first delivery in June 1997, it set nearly 40 city-pair and/or speed and distance records, and its development team was awarded the 1997 Robert J. Collier Trophy, the highest honor in aeronautics or astronautics in North America. In 1998, Gulfstream purchased K-C Aviation from Kimberly-Clark Corp. for $250 million, which had operations in Dallas, Appleton, Wisconsin, and Westfield, Massachusetts.

=== 2000s ===
In 1999, General Dynamics purchased Gulfstream, and it opened a $5.5 million aircraft refurbishment and completions support facility in Savannah in 2000. In 2001, it acquired Galaxy Aerospace and with it, the mid-size Astra SPX and super mid-size Galaxy, which were later rebranded the Gulfstream G100 and Gulfstream G200, respectively. Also in 2001, Gulfstream purchased four U.S. maintenance facilities in Dallas, Las Vegas, Minneapolis, and West Palm Beach, Florida. Those service centers, along with a Gulfstream facility in Westfield, Massachusetts, formed General Dynamics Aviation Services, which maintained and repaired Gulfstream and other business-jet aircraft.

In 2002, Gulfstream renamed its products, using Arabic numerals instead of Roman numerals to differentiate its aircraft. At the time, the company's lineup included the ultra long-range Gulfstream G550 and G500, the long-range Gulfstream G400, the mid-range Gulfstream G300 and G200, and the high-speed G100. 2002 was also the year that Gulfstream introduced its Airborne Product Support aircraft, a specially equipped G100 used to deliver parts and provide any-time service to Gulfstream customers under warranty in North America and the Caribbean.

In 2003, Gulfstream acquired a service center at the London-Luton Airport, the first Gulfstream-owned service center to be operated outside the United States. Also, in 2003, the long-range Gulfstream G450 was introduced. The large-cabin, mid-range G350 was presented a year later. In 2004, Gulfstream was awarded the 2003 Collier Trophy for the development of the G550. It was the second time in less than a decade that Gulfstream had won the award. The G550 is the first civil aircraft to receive a Type Certificate issued by the Federal Aviation Administration (FAA) that includes an Enhanced Vision System (EVS) as standard equipment on an aircraft. The aircraft also contained the first cockpit to incorporate PlaneView®, an integrated avionics suite featuring four 14-inch (36 cm) liquid crystal displays in landscape format.

In 2005, Gulfstream began to offer an in-flight internet connection – its Broad Band Multi-Link (BBML) system. Gulfstream also designed and developed a means of reducing the sonic boom caused by an aircraft "breaking" the sound barrier – the Quiet Spike. The Quiet Spike is a telescopic nose device that softens the effect of the sonic boom by smoothing the pressure wave created by flying at the speed of sound. Gulfstream views lifting the current US supersonic ban as essential for a viable business case for supersonic aircraft.

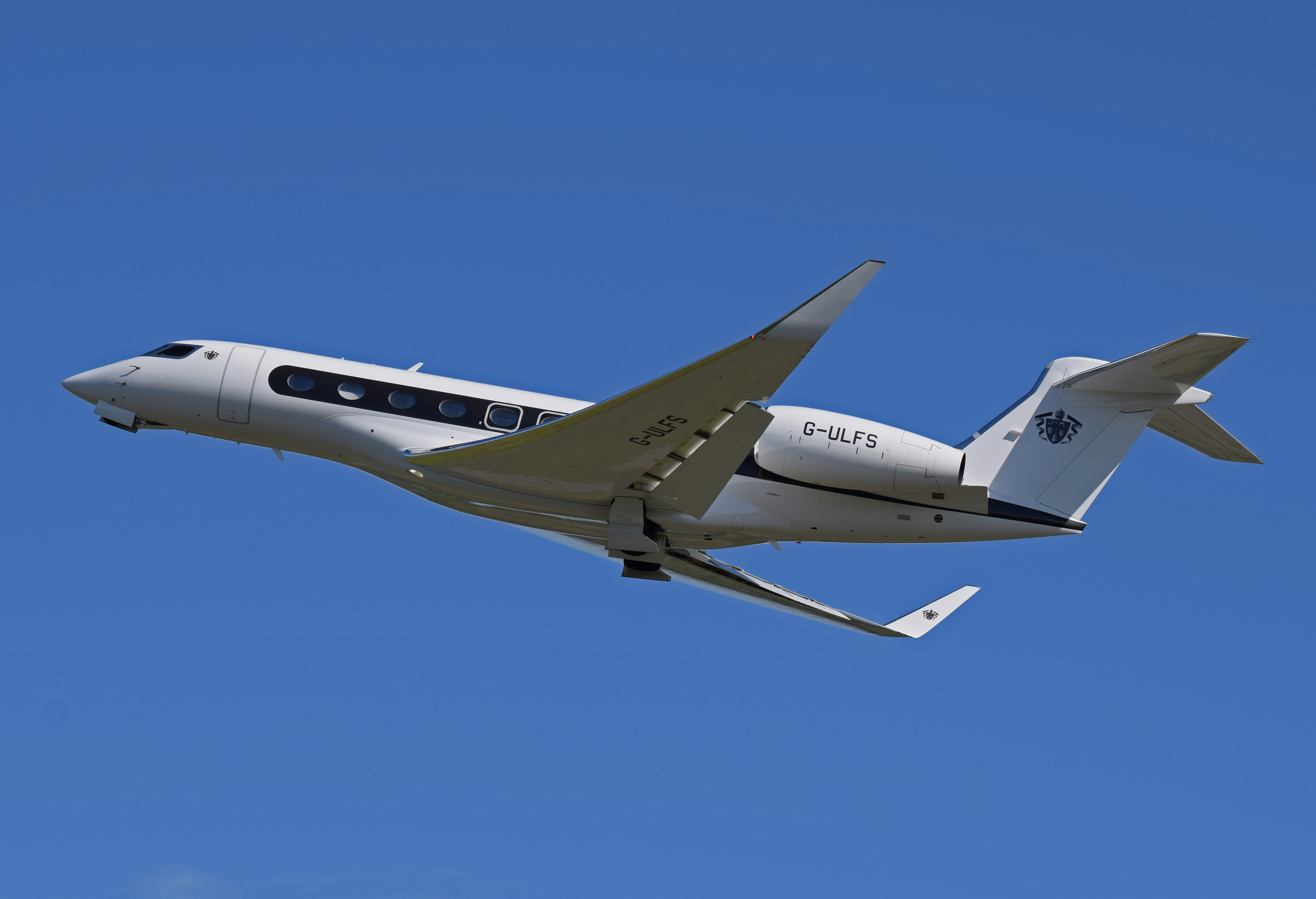
Gulfstream G650 departs Bristol Airport, England, in 2014

In 2006, the 12-year production run of the G100 ended, and the Gulfstream G150 entered service to take its place. The G150 was the first business jet to be certified by the FAA for Stage 4, the industry's most stringent noise standards. Also in 2006, Gulfstream announced plans to expand its manufacturing and service facilities in Savannah. The seven-year, $400 million Long-Range Facilities Master Plan included the creation of a new 624,588-square-foot (58,030 m^{2}) service center, an independent fuel farm, a 42,600-square-foot (3,960 m^{2}) paint hangar and the addition of a new Sales and Design Center. As a result of the expansion, employment at the facility was expected to grow by some 1,100 jobs. To meet the immediate need for engineering office space, Gulfstream opened a Research and Development Center (RDC). The RDC accommodates approximately 750 technical and engineering employees.

In April 2007 Gulfstream broke ground for a new business-jet manufacturing building at its headquarters in Savannah. The following month, the company signed a nine-year lease with North Point Real Estate for a second Research and Development Center. The RDC II consists of an office building, which can accommodate 550 employees, and a laboratory building, which is designed for 150 employees and test equipment used in Gulfstream's research and development work. Gulfstream completed the new Sales and Design Center addition in June and officially opened the first phase of the new Savannah Service Center in August.

In 2007, Gulfstream tested its Synthetic Vision-Primary Flight Display (SV-PFD) and EVS II together for the first time. The SV-PFD is an enhancement to the Gulfstream PlaneView flight displays. It features a three-dimensional color image of terrain overlaid with the primary flight display instrument symbology, which are arranged on the screen to create a large-view area for terrain. By early 2008, the FAA had certified both EVS II and SV-PFD.

On March 13, 2008, Gulfstream announced the introduction of a new business jet: the Gulfstream G650. The G650 offered the longest range, fastest speed, largest cabin and most advanced cockpit in the Gulfstream fleet. It is capable of traveling 7,000 nautical miles (12,960 km; 8,060 mi) at Mach 0.85 or will cover shorter distances at Mach 0.925, making it the fastest civilian aircraft flying at the time. It can climb to 51,000 feet (15,540 m), allowing it to avoid airline-traffic congestion and adverse weather.

On October 5 of the same year, Gulfstream announced another addition to its business-jet fleet: the large-cabin, mid-range Gulfstream G250 (later renamed the Gulfstream G280). It is capable of traveling 3,600 nautical miles (6,670 km; 4,140 mi) at Mach 0.80 and has a maximum operating speed of Mach 0.85. It can reach its 41,000-foot (12,500 m) initial cruise altitude in 20 minutes and can climb to a maximum altitude of 45,000 feet (13,720 m).

In 2009, the company conducted two powered rollouts one week apart. The Gulfstream G650 officially rolled out of the Savannah manufacturing facility under its own power on September 29, 2009. The G280 followed just one week later.

Both the G650 and the G280 flew before the end of 2009. The G650 took its first flight on November 25, while the G280 went up for the first time on December 11.

=== 2010s ===
In November 2010, Gulfstream announced an expansion of its Savannah facilities through a $500-million, seven-year plan. The growth resulted in 1,000 additional Gulfstream jobs, an increase of more than 15 percent.

In addition to the Savannah expansion, Gulfstream's sites in Westfield, Massachusetts, US, and Luton, UK, also grew in 2011. In October, Gulfstream announced an expansion of its service center at the Barnes Regional Airport in Westfield, Massachusetts, that will result in 100 additional Gulfstream jobs, a nearly 80 percent increase over the size of Gulfstream's Westfield workforce. The Luton service center also relocated to a 75,000-square-foot, more modern hangar. The hangar and accompanying office area nearly doubles space at the site, allowing Gulfstream Luton technicians to service Gulfstream's entire fleet, including the all-new G650, the company's flagship aircraft.

Gulfstream suffered a major setback on April 2, 2011, when one of its G650 ultra long-range business jets crashed on the runway at Roswell, NM, fatally injuring the two test pilots and two flight test engineers on board. The aircraft was conducting a takeoff-performance test during which an engine failure was simulated by reducing the right engine's thrust to idle. The G650 became airborne briefly at a high angle of attack before its right wingtip hit the runway, then slid on the ground and caught fire.

The National Transportation Safety Board (NTSB) determined the probable cause of the crash was an aerodynamic stall of the aircraft due to a failure to properly develop and validate takeoff speeds, persistent and increasingly aggressive attempts to achieve a V2 speed that was too low and an inadequate investigation of previous uncommanded roll events. Following the crash, Gulfstream raised the V2 speed of the G650. The NTSB accused Gulfstream of withholding information and the use of legal counsel during the investigation, which were denied by the company.

In November 2011, the Gulfstream G650 received its provisional type certificate (PTC) from the FAA. This cleared the way for the company to begin interior completions of the ultra-large-cabin, ultra-long-range business jet in preparation for customer deliveries in the second quarter of 2012, as originally planned.

In January 2011, General Dynamics Aviation Services was rebranded as Gulfstream to simplify its brand identity. Gulfstream now owns and operates nine service centers worldwide, plus one component repair facility.

As of late 2012 there were indications that Gulfstream was close to announcing the design of a quiet supersonic business jet, first drawings of which appeared in December 2012.

Gulfstream employs more than 11,500 people at 12 major locations: Savannah, Georgia.; Appleton, Wisconsin; Brunswick, Georgia; Dallas; Las Vegas; Westfield, Massachusetts; West Palm Beach, Florida; Van Nuys and Lincoln, California in the US; London, UK; Mexicali, Mexico, and Sorocaba, Brazil;

The Gulfstream G500/G600 were unveiled on October 14, 2014, with the G500 taxiing under its own power. It first flew on May 18, 2015. The longer G600 followed on December 17, 2016, intended for delivery in 2018.

The company expects the 2017 deliveries to be the same as 2016 at 115 units: 88 large and 27 midsize G280s.

Following the meeting of US President Donald Trump and Qatar’s Emir Sheikh Tamim bin Hamad Al Thani in July 2019, Qatar Airways expressed a desire to buy large-cabin aircraft from Gulfstream.

=== 2020s ===
On October 4, 2021, the company introduced the G400 and G800 to their product line.

On 28 March 2023, Gulfstream opened a 12,000 ft^{2} (1,100 m^{2}) sales and design center in Beverly Hills, housing mock ups for the G400, G700 and G800 cabins.

=== Government and special mission aircraft ===
About 200 Gulfstream are used by 35 governments, mainly the G550: air transports of heads of state and government, airborne early warning, medical evacuation, high-altitude atmospheric research, and intelligence, surveillance and reconnaissance.

== Products ==
Family Tree of Gulfstream Aircraft

Aero Commander 500
Gulfstream I
IAI Westwind
Gulfstream II
Gulfstream III
IAI Astra
Gulfstream IV
Gulfstream G300 (2002)
Gulfstream G350
Gulfstream G400 (2003)
Gulfstream G450
Gulfstream V
Gulfstream G500 (2003)
Gulfstream G550
IAI Galaxy
Gulfstream G100	Gulfstream G200
Gulfstream G150
Gulfstream VI
Gulfstream G650	Gulfstream G250
Gulfstream G700	Gulfstream G280
Gulfstream G800
Gulfstream VII
Gulfstream G400 (2024)
Gulfstream G500 (2015)
Gulfstream G600
Gulfstream G300 (2025)

=== Existing products ===
Model name	First flight	Number built	Type
Gulfstream G300	2025	1	Twin engine business jet
Gulfstream G400	2024	1	Twin engine business jet
Gulfstream G500	2015	125+	Twin engine business jet
Gulfstream G600	2016	130+	Twin engine business jet
Gulfstream G700	2020	53+	Twin engine business jet
Gulfstream G800	2022		Twin engine business jet

=== Former products ===
Model name	First flight	Number built	Type
Gulfstream American Hustler	1978	1	Prototype turboprop and turbofan engine business aircraft
Gulfstream Peregrine	1983	1	Prototype single engine business jet
Gulfstream Peregrine 600	1981	1	Prototype single jet engine trainer
Gulfstream I	1958	200 (Note: All aircraft built while under Grumman ownership and before existence as independent company.)	Twin-turboprop business aircraft
Gulfstream II	1966	256 (Note: Many aircraft built while under Grumman ownership and before existence as independent company.)	Twin engine business jet
Gulfstream III	1979	206	Twin engine business jet
Gulfstream IV	1985	500	Twin engine business jet
Gulfstream V	1995	193	Twin engine business jet
Gulfstream G100	1984 (Note: As IAI Astra.)	145 (Note: Includes aircraft built by Israel Aerospace Industries.)	Twin engine business jet
Gulfstream G150	2005	120	Twin engine business jet
Gulfstream G200	1997 (Note: As IAI Astra Galaxy.)	250 (Note: Includes aircraft built by Israel Aerospace Industries.)	Twin engine business jet
Gulfstream G280	2009	200+	Twin engine business jet
Gulfstream G300 (2002)		13	Twin engine business jet
Gulfstream G350		11	Twin engine business jet
Gulfstream G400 (2003)			Twin engine business jet
Gulfstream G450		354	Twin engine business jet
Gulfstream G500 (2003)			Twin engine business jet
Gulfstream G550	2001		Twin engine business jet
Gulfstream G650	2009	598	Twin engine business jet
Sukhoi-Gulfstream S-21	N/A	0	Unbuilt trijet supersonic business jet

== See also ==
- Gulfstream X-54
