= Eclipse Award for Outstanding Owner =

Horse racing honor for racehorse owners

Eclipse Award for Outstanding Owner is an American Thoroughbred horse racing honor for racehorse owners. Created in 1971, it is part of the Eclipse Awards program and is awarded annually.

Past winners:

- 1971 : Mr. & Mrs. E. E. Fogelson
- 1972 : No award
- 1973 : No award
- 1974 : Dan Lasater
- 1975 : Dan Lasater
- 1976 : Dan Lasater
- 1977 : Maxwell Gluck
- 1978 : Harbor View Farm
- 1979 : Harbor View Farm
- 1980 : Bertram & Diana Firestone
- 1981 : Dotsam Stable
- 1982 : Viola Sommer
- 1983 : John A. Franks
- 1984 : John A. Franks
- 1985 : Mr. & Mrs. Gene Klein
- 1986 : Mr. & Mrs. Gene Klein
- 1987 : Mr. & Mrs. Gene Klein
- 1988 : Ogden Phipps
- 1989 : Ogden Phipps
- 1990 : Frances A. Genter
- 1991 : Sam-Son Farm
- 1992 : Juddmonte Farms
- 1993 : John A. Franks
- 1994 : John A. Franks
- 1995 : Allen E. Paulson
- 1996 : Allen E. Paulson
- 1997 : Carolyn Hine
- 1998 : Frank Stronach
- 1999 : Frank Stronach
- 2000 : Frank Stronach
- 2001 : Richard A. Englander
- 2002 : Richard A. Englander
- 2003 : Juddmonte Farms
- 2004 : Kenneth and Sarah Ramsey
- 2005 : Michael J. Gill
- 2006 : Lael Stables & Darley Stables (tied)
- 2007 : Shadwell Stable
- 2008 : Stronach Stables
- 2009 : Godolphin
- 2010 : WinStar Farm
- 2011 : Kenneth and Sarah Ramsey
- 2012 : Godolphin Racing
- 2013 : Kenneth and Sarah Ramsey
- 2014 : Kenneth and Sarah Ramsey
- 2015 : Zayat Stables
- 2016 : Juddmonte Farms
- 2017 : Juddmonte Farms
- 2018 : Hronis Racing
- 2019 : Klaravich Stables and William H. Lawrence
- 2020 : Godolphin
- 2021 : Godolphin
- 2022 : Godolphin
- 2023 : Godolphin
- 2024 : Godolphin
- 2025 : Godolphin
