= Joe Hirsch Turf Classic Invitational Handicap top three finishers and starters =

This is a listing of the horses that finished in either first, second, or third place and the number of starters in the Joe Hirsch Turf Classic Invitational Handicap, an American Grade 1 race for three-year-olds and up at 1½ miles on turf held at Belmont Park in New York. (List 1977–present)

Year	Winner	Second	Third	Starters
2014	Main Sequence	Twilight Eclipse	Imagining	7
2013	Little Mike	Big Blue Kitten	Real Solution	9
2012	Point of Entry	Treasure Beach	Kindergarden Kid	6
2011	Cape Blanco	Dean's Kitten	Grassy	5
2010	Winchester	Paddy O'Prado	Grassy	9
2009	Interpatation	Gio Ponti	Grand Couturier	6
2008	Grand Couturier	Interpatation	Summer Patriot	8
2007	English Channel	Stream of Gold	Interpatation	7
2006	English Channel	Freedonia	Royal Highness	7
2005	Shakespeare	English Channel	Ace	7
2004	Kitten's Joy	Magistretti	Tycoon	7
2003	Sulamani	Deeliteful Irving	Balto Star	7
2002	Denon	Blazing Fury	Delta Form	8
2001	Timboroa	King Cugat	Cetewayo	6
2000	John's Call	Craigsteel	Ela Athena	12
1999	Val's Prince	Dream Well	Fahris	7
1998	Buck's Boy	Cetewayo	Lazy Lode	6
1997	Val's Prince	Flag Down	Ops Smile	5
1996	Diplomatic Jet	Awad	Marlin	10
1995	Turk Passer	Hernando	Celtic Arms	8
1994	Tikkanen	Vaudeville	Yenda	6
1993	Apple Tree	Solar Splendor	George Augustus	5
1992	Sky Classic	Fraise	Solar Splendor	6
1991	Solar Splendor	Dear Doctor	Fortune's Wheel	9
1990	Cacoethes	Alwuhush	With Approval	6
1989	Yankee Affair	El Senor	My Big Boy	7
1988	Sunshine Forever	My Big Boy	Most Welcome	9
1987	Theatrical	River Memories	Talakeno	6
1986	Manila	Damister	Danger's Hour	9
1985	Noble Fighter	Win	Strawberry Road	12
1984	John Henry	Win	Majesty's Prince	6
1983	All Along	Thunder Puddles	Erins Isle	10
1982	April Run	Naskra's Breeze	Bottled Water	7
1981	April Run	Galaxy Libra	The Very One	9
1980	Anifa	Golden Act	John Henry	8
1979	Bowl Game	Trillion	Native Courier	7
1978	Waya	Tiller	Trillion	6
1977	Johnny D.	Majestic Light	Crow	9

== See also ==
- Joe Hirsch Turf Classic Invitational Handicap
