= Joe Palmer Award =

American horse racing award

- Sport: Horse racing
- Awarded for: "Meritorious service to racing"
- Location: U.S.
- Presented by: National Turf Writers Association

History
- First award: 1964
- First winner: Wathen Knebelkamp
- Most recent: Joe Harper

The Joe Palmer Award is presented annually by the National Turf Writers and Broadcasters (NTWAB) for long and meritorious service to horse racing. The award is dedicated to Joe Palmer, who served as racing editor of the New York Herald Tribune.

== History ==
The award, presented since 1964, honors the legacy of the New York Herald Tribune's Joe H. Palmer.

The Joe Palmer Award recognizes an individual for meritorious service to thoroughbred racing. Each year, it is presented during the National Turf Writers Association's annual dinner.

Wathen Knebelkamp, former president of Churchill Downs, was the first to receive the honor.

== Past recipients ==
- 1964 – (United States) Wathen Knebelkamp
- 1965 – (United States) John D. Schapiro
- 1966 – (United States) Marshall Cassidy
- 1967 – (United States) John Longden
- 1968 – (United States) Marion Van Berg
- 1969 – (United States) Raymond R. Guest
- 1970 – (United States) Warner L. Jones Jr.
- 1971 – (United States) Bill Shoemaker
- 1972 – (United States) Paul Mellon
- 1973 – (United States) John Galbreath
- 1974 – (United States) Secretariat
- 1975 – (United States) I. J. Collins
- 1976 – (United States) Fred W. Hooper
- 1977 – (United States) Nelson Bunker Hunt
- 1978 – (United States) Steve Cauthen
- 1979 – (United States) Laz Barrera
- 1980 – (Canada) Chick Lang; (United States) Leo O’Donnell
- 1981 – (United States) Keene Daingerfield; Marion duPont Scott
- 1982 – (United States) Frank E. "Jimmy" Kilroe
- 1983 – (United States) Sonny Werblin
- 1984 – (Canada) E. P. Taylor
- 1985 – (United States) John Gaines
- 1986 – (United States) James E. "Ted" Bassett III
- 1987 – (United States) Alfred Vanderbilt
- 1988 – (United States) Charlie Whittingham
- 1989 – (United States) Shug McGaughey
- 1990 – (United States) James P. Ryan
- 1991 – (United States) Joe Burnham
- 1992 – (United States) Barry Weisbord
- 1993 – (United States) Henryk de Kwiatkowski
- 1994 – (United States) Joe Hirsch
- 1995 – (United States) Mark Kaufman
- 1996 – (United States) Allen E. Paulson and Cigar
- 1997 – (United States) Jim Bolus
- 1998 – (Canada) Sandy Hawley
- 1999 – (United States) Kent Hollingsworth
- 2000 – (United States) Jim McKay
- 2001 – (United States) Shirley Day Smith
- 2002 – (United States) Richard L. Duchossois; (Canada) Eugene Melnyk
- 2003 – (United States) Laffit Pincay Jr.
- 2004 – (United States) Noble Threewitt
- 2005 – (United States) Pete Pedersen
- 2006 – (United States) Dr. Dean Richardson and New Bolton Center
- 2007 – (United States) Dr. Larry Bramlage
- 2008 – (United States) Chris McCarron
- 2009 – (United States) Dr. Jack Robbins
- 2010 – (United States) Old Friends Equine
- 2011 – (United States) Nancy LaSala
- 2012 – (United States) Raymond "Butch" Lear
- 2013 – (United States) Marylou Whitney and John Hendrickson
- 2014 – (United States) Cot Campbell
- 2015 – (United States) Cathy Schenck
- 2016 – (United States) American Association of Equine Practitioners
- 2017 – (United States) Winners Foundation
- 2018 – (United States) Jim Gluckson
- 2019 – (United States) Rick Violette
- 2020 – None
- 2021 – (United States) Dan Smith
- 2022 – (United States) Barbara Livingston
- 2023 – (United States) Edwin J. Gregson Foundation
- 2024 – (United States) Backside Learning Center
- 2025 – (United States) Joe Harper

== See also ==
- National Turf Writers Association
