= Cash Asmussen =

American jockey

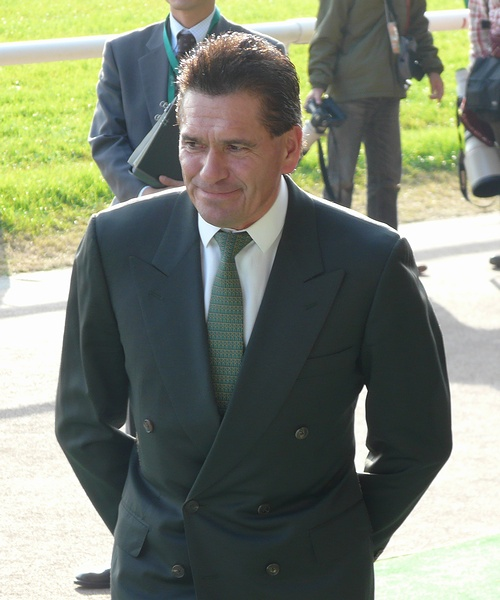
Asmussen in 2010

Cash Asmussen (born March 15, 1962, in Agar, South Dakota) is an American thoroughbred horse racing jockey. Born Brian Keith Asmussen, in 1977 he legally changed his name to "Cash".

From a Texas horse racing family, his parents, Keith and Marilyn "Sis" Asmussen, operate a ranch in Laredo in Webb County, Texas. His brother, Steve Asmussen, is a successful horse trainer in American racing. He is currently residing in Laredo, Texas, with his Wife, Erica Asmussen and three daughters.

== Career ==
Asmussen scored his first important graded stakes race win at the Beldame Stakes in 1979 and won that year's Eclipse Award for Outstanding Apprentice Jockey. In 1981, he rode Wayward Lass to victory in the Coaching Club American Oaks at Belmont Park (over the 1-5 entry of De La Rose and Heavenly Cause, who ran last and next-to-last), and traveled to Japan where he won the Japan Cup. The following year he won the Washington, D.C. International Stakes and his first of two Turf Classic Invitational Stakes then gained his most success as a jockey racing in France where he went to ride under contract for the wealthy stable owner, Stavros Niarchos.

While based at Chantilly Racecourse in Chantilly, France, Asmussen also scored victories in a number of important stakes races in England including the 1988 July Cup, 1989 Coronation Stakes, 1990 Coronation Cup, and the 1993 St. James's Palace Stakes. Racing in Ireland he won the 1987 Irish St. Leger and the 1988 National Stakes. Asmussen also returned to compete in the U.S. for various major races and won his second "Washington, D.C., International" in 1984 plus the 1988 and 1992 Arlington Million in Chicago. Internationally he also won the 1993 Canadian International Stakes and the 1997 Hong Kong Cup.

The first foreign rider to win the French riding title, between 1985 and 1990 Asmussen was the country's Champion jockey every year except for 1987 when he competed in Ireland. In 1991, he rode Suave Dancer to victory in the Prix de l'Arc de Triomphe, France's most prestigious race. In 1998, riding Dream Well Asmussen completed the double, by winning both the Irish and French Derby. During his career in France he won numerous other Group 1 races.

Asmussen retired from riding in 2001. Over the course of his career, he rode more than 3,000 winners .

== Major winners ==
Canada

- Canadian International Stakes: 1993 Husband
- Arlington Million: 1988 Mill Native

United States

- Beldame Stakes: 1979 Waya
- Vosburgh Stakes: 1980 Plugged Nickle, 1981 Guilty Conscience
- Coaching Club American Oaks: 1981 Wayward Lass
- Mother Goose Stakes: 1981 Wayward Lass
- Turf Classic Invitational Stakes: 1982 April Run, 1994 Tikkanen
- Washington, D.C. International Stakes: 1982 April Run, 1984 Seattle Song
- Hollywood Derby: 1984 Procida
- Arlington Million: 1992 Dear Doctor
- Breeders' Cup Mile: 1997 Spinning World

France

- Prix de l'Arc de Triomphe: 1991 Suave Dancer
- Prix du Cadran: 1988 Yaka, 1992 Sought Out
- Prix de l'Opéra: 1990 Colour Chart, 1998 Insight
- Prix de la Forêt: 1993 Dolphin Street
- Prix Jacques Le Marois: 1989 Polish Precedent, 1992 Exit to Nowhere, 1994 East of the Moon, 1996 & 1997 Spinning World
- Grand Critérium: 1989 Jade Robbery, 1998 Way of Light
- Grand Prix de Paris: 1989 Dancehall
- Grand Prix de Saint-Cloud: 1988 Village Star, 1990 In the Wings, 1997 Helissio, 2000 Montjeu
- Poule d'Essai des Pouliches: 1993 Madeleine's Dream, 1994 East of the Moon
- Poule d'Essai des Poulains: 1983 L'Emigrant, 1986 Fast Topaze, 1993 Kingmambo
- Prix d'Ispahan: 1987 Highest Honor, 1990 Creator
- Prix du Jockey Club: 1991 Suave Dancer, 1993 Hernando, 1998 Dream Well, 1999 Montjeu
- Prix de Diane: 1984 Northern Trick, 1994 East of the Moon, 1996 Sil Sila
- Prix Royal-Oak: 1988 Star Lift
- Prix Jean Prat: 1984 Mendez, 1985 Baillamont, 1986 Magical Wonder, 1989 Local Talent
- Prix du Moulin de Longchamp: 1984 Mendez, 1988 Soviet Star, 1989 Polish Precedent, 1993 Kingmambo, 1997 Spinning World, 2000 Indian Lodge
- Prix de la Salamandre: 1983 Seattle Song, 1993 Coup de Genie
- Prix Ganay: 1984 Romildo, 1990 Creator
- Prix Lupin: 1983 L'Emigrant, 1986 Fast Topaze, 1993 Hernando
- Prix Maurice de Gheest: 1990 Dead Certain, 1995 Cherokee Rose
- Prix Morny: 1993 Coup de Genie
- Prix Vermeille: 1984 Northern Trick, 1996 My Emma

Hong Kong

- Hong Kong Cup: 1997 Val's Prince

Ireland

- Irish St. Leger: 1987 Eurobird
- National Stakes: 1985 Tate Gallery, 1987 Caerwent
- Irish Derby: 1998 Dream Well, 1999 Montjeu
- Irish 2,000 Guineas: 1996 Spinning World
- Irish Champion Stakes: 1991 Suave Dancer

Japan

- Japan Cup: 1981 Mairzy Doates

(United Kingdom) Great Britain

- July Cup: 1988 Soviet Star
- Coronation Stakes: 1989 Golden Opinion
- Coronation Cup: 1990 In the Wings
- St. James's Palace Stakes: 1993 Kingmambo
- Racing Post Trophy: 1991 Seattle Rhyme
- Cheveley Park Stakes: 1989 Dead Certain
- Fillies' Mile: 1993 Fairy Heights
- Haydock Sprint Cup: 1991 Polar Falcon, 1995 Cherokee Rose
- Middle Park Stakes: 1990 Lycius
