= Pierre Bellocq =

French and American cartoonist (1926–2026)

Pierre Camille Lucien Hilaire Jean Bellocq (November 25, 1926 – November 12, 2026) was a French and American artist and horse racing cartoonist known as "Peb". As a small boy, his family moved to Maisons-Laffitte where his father worked at the local race track. There, at a young age Pierre Bellocq used his natural talent to begin creating caricatures of horses and horse people. At age 19, the French racing journal France Courses gave him national exposure when they published one of his cartoons of a jockey. Bellocq signed the drawing as "Peb", a signature which would become his lifelong moniker. Within a few years Peb was widely known and an emerging artist who also gained recognition for his caricatures on sports advertising posters.

== Life and career ==
Bellocq was born in Bedenac, Charente-Maritime, France, on November 25, 1926. By 1954, Bellocq's work had achieved international recognition and he was contracted by Laurel Park owner John D. Schapiro to do drawings for the inaugural running of the Washington, D.C. International Stakes. He settled in the United States and in early 1955 accepted an offer to work as the staff cartoonist for the Morning Telegraph newspaper and its sister paper, the Daily Racing Form, a job he held until December 2008.

He produced several books; his first consisted of 150 cartoons and was titled Peb's Equine Comedy. It was published by Random House in 1957 and is still in print. As well, he did the illustrations for the 1969 Joe Hirsch book A Treasury of Questions and Answers from the Morning Telegraph and Daily Racing Form. In 2004, he created drawings for author Ed Hotaling's book on jockey Jimmy Winkfield whom Bellocq had known personally when the African American rider was living and racing in his hometown of Maisons-Laffitte, France.

Bellocq received the National Cartoonists Society 1991 Sports Cartoon Award and their 1999 Newspaper Illustration Award. In 1998, the Daniel Wildenstein Art Gallery in New York held an exhibition of Bellocq's work titled "The Racing World in Sketch and Caricature." From July 24, 2004, until December 31, 2005, the National Museum of Racing and Hall of Fame put on a special exhibition of his works titled "Peb: The Art of Humor" that celebrated his 50th anniversary of horse racing artwork in the United States.

In 2001, when Churchill Downs began its major renovations, one of the additions to the clubhouse was a 36-foot mural by Pierre Bellocq depicting all 96 jockeys who had won the Kentucky Derby from 1875 to 2004. Another Bellocq mural, in the clubhouse of Belmont Park in Elmont, New York, depicts the dominant jockeys, trainers and racing personalities of the track's century-long history.

Pierre Bellocq died on November 12, 2026, aged 99.

== Works ==
- Peb's Equine Comedy (1957)
- Peb 71 (1971)
- Peb at Keeneland (1986)
- Forty years of Peb: The racing world in sketch and caricature (1995)
- Peb: The Art of Humor (2004)
- PEB: Possum, Emu, Bat: Ablafor and the Art of Sleeping (2005)

Pierre Bellocq's sons Rémi and Pierre Jr. are both involved in horse racing. Rémi Bellocq is the executive director of equine programming for Bluegrass Community and Technical College, which includes the North American Racing Academy (NARA); and Pierre Bellocq Jr. is a Thoroughbred trainer in Southern California.
