= Eclipse Award of Merit =

Award Event

The Eclipse Award of Merit is part of the American Eclipse Awards in Thoroughbred horse racing. It is presented to an individual or entity displaying outstanding lifetime achievement in, and service to, the Thoroughbred industry.

First awarded in 1976, the Eclipse Award of Merit is voted on by a panel of representatives from the National Thoroughbred Racing Association, Daily Racing Form and the National Turf Writers Association.

== Winners ==
- 2025 - Ed Bowen (posthumously)
- 2023 - Stuart Janney
- 2021 - Earle I. Mack
- 2018 - Joe Harper
- 2016 - Andrew Beyer / Steven Crist
- 2015 - Leonard Lavin
- 2014 - Tom Durkin
- 2013 - D. Wayne Lukas
- 2012 - Nick Nicholson
- 2011 - W. Cothran "Cot" Campbell
- 2010 - Claiborne Farm / Marylou Whitney
- 2009 - William S. Farish III, Lane's End Farm
- 2008 - Alice Headley Chandler of Mill Ridge Farm
- 2006 - John A. Nerud
- 2005 - Penny Chenery
- 2004 - The Cella Family
- 2003 - Richard L. Duchossois
- 2002 - Ogden Phipps / Howard Battle
- 2001 - Harry T. Mangurian Jr. / Pete Pederson
- 2000 - Jim McKay
- 1998 - D. G. Van Clief Jr.
- 1997 - Bob and Beverly Lewis
- 1996 - Allen E. Paulson
- 1995 - James E. "Ted" Bassett III
- 1994 - Alfred G. Vanderbilt II
- 1993 - Paul Mellon
- 1992 - Joe Hirsch / Robert P. Strub
- 1991 - Fred W. Hooper
- 1990 - Warner L. Jones Jr.
- 1989 - Michael Sandler
- 1988 - John Forsythe
- 1987 - James B. Faulconer
- 1986 - Herman Cohen
- 1985 - Keene Daingerfield
- 1984 - John R. Gaines
- 1981 - Bill Shoemaker
- 1980 - John D. Shapiro
- 1979 - Frank E. Kilroe
- 1978 - Ogden Mills Phipps
- 1977 - Steve Cauthen
- 1976 - Jack J. Dreyfus
