= Aviance (horse) =

Irish-bred Thoroughbred racehorse

- Sire: Northfields
- Grandsire: Northern Dancer
- Dam: Minnie Hauk
- Damsire: Sir Ivor
- Sex: Mare
- Foaled: 6 May 1982
- Country: Ireland
- Colour: Chestnut
- Breeder: Ballydoyle Stud
- Owner: Robert Sangster; Stavros Niarchos
- Trainer: David O'Brien
- Record: 6: 2-0-0

Major wins
- Phoenix Stakes (1984)

Awards
- Timeform rating 111p (1984), 112 (1985)

Aviance (6 May 1982 – after 2006) was an Irish Thoroughbred racehorse and broodmare. She was unbeaten in two races as a juvenile in 1984, including the Group 1 Phoenix Stakes. In 1985 she failed to win or place in four races but ran well in defeat in several top-class races including the 1000 Guineas and the July Cup. After retiring at the end of the season she became a very successful broodmare, and is the female-line ancestor of many good winners.

== Background ==
Aviance was a small, "lightly-built" chestnut mare with a narrow white blaze bred in Ireland by the Ballydoyle Stud. She raced for most of her career in the colours of the British businessman Robert Sangster and was trained in Ireland by David O'Brien.

She was sired by Northfields, an American horse whose biggest win came in the Louisiana Derby in 1971, before spending most of his stud career in Europe. His other winners included Northjet, Oats, North Stoke and Northern Treasure. Aviance's dam Minnie Hauk was a daughter of the influential broodmare Best In Show, whose other descendants included El Gran Senor, Try My Best, Xaar, Jazil, Rags to Riches and Redoute's Choice.

== Racing career ==
=== 1984: two-year-old season ===
Aviance began her racing career in a maiden race over seven furlongs at Leopardstown Racecourse in July. She started the odds-on favourite and won "impressively" by six lengths from twelve opponents. On her second, and only subsequent run as a two-year-old, the filly was stepped up to Group 1 class for the Phoenix Stakes over six furlongs at Phoenix Park Racecourse in August. Ridden by Declan Gillespie she started the 7/4 second favourite behind the Vincent O'Brien-trained colt Magic Mirror, who had won the Norfolk Stakes at Royal Ascot in June. The best fancied of the other six runners were the unbeaten filly La Escala and the colt Beginners Luck. Aviance was among the leaders from the start, went clear of her rivals approaching the last quarter mile and won by three lengths from Well Related, with La Escala and Magic Mirror in third and fourth. Plans to bring the filly back for a run in the Cheveley Park Stakes were abandoned as she had "gone in her coat".

In the official International Classification of two-year-olds for 1984 Aviance was given a rating of 75, seven pounds behind the top-rated filly Triptych. She was rated the third-best Irish filly behind Park Appeal and Alydar's Best. The independent Timeform organisation gave her a rating of 111 p (the "p" meaning that she was expected to make more than usual improvement) making her fourteen pounds inferior to Triptych. In their annual "Racehorses of 1984", Timeform described her as "a filly of considerable potential".

=== 1985: three-year-old season ===
Aviance began her second campaign in the 1000 Guineas over the Rowley Mile course at Newmarket on 2 May. Ridden by Christy Roche she started at odds of 9/1 in a seventeen-runner field and finished well to take sixth place, three lengths behind the winner Oh So Sharp. In the Irish 1,000 Guineas at the Curragh three weeks later she failed to reproduce her best form and finished eleventh behind Al Bahathri. The filly was then dropped back to sprint distances and matched against older horses in the July Cup at Newmarket on 11 July. She ran well and disputed the lead for most of the way but faded in the final furlong and came home sixth of the nine runners behind Never So Bold.

After the July Cup Aviance was formally transferred to the ownership of the Greek shipping magnate Stavros Niarchos, whose colours she carried in the five furlong William Hill Sprint Championship at York Racecourse. Ridden by Roche and starting at odds of 10/1 she was in contention in the first half of the race but faded in the last quarter mile to finish seventh behind Never So Bold.

Her performances in 1985 saw her awarded a 112 rating by Timeform, 19 pounds behind Oh So Sharp who was the top-rated three-year-old filly.

== Breeding record ==
Aviance was retired to become a broodmare for her owner's stud. After the death of Niarchos in 1996 she passed into the ownership of Flaxman Holdings, the breeding company of the Niarchos family. She produced at least fourteen foals and nine winners between 1987 and 2006.

- Chimes of Freedom, a chestnut filly, foaled in 1987, sired by Private Account. Won six races including the Moyglare Stud Stakes and Coronation Stakes. Dam of the American Champion Sprint Horse Aldebaran.
- Imperfect Circle, brown filly, 1988, by Riverman. Won two races including Firth of Clyde Stakes. Dam of Spinning World and grand-dam of both Pathfork and War of Will.
- Binkhaldoun, colt, 1989, by Roberto. Won two races.
- Ledge of Night, bay colt, 1990, by Alleged. Unraced.
- Piquetnol, chestnut filly, 1992, by Private Account. Failed to win in five races. Dam of Dietrich (King George Stakes).
- Privately Held, bay colt, 1994, by Private Account. Won eight races.
- Prehistoric, bay colt, 1995, by Pleasant Colony. Unraced.
- Remote Romance, chestnut filly, 1997, by Irish River. Won two races. Dam of Saddex (Rheinland-Pokal, Premio Presidente della Repubblica).
- Denon, bay colt, 1998, by Pleasant Colony. Won six races including Hollywood Derby, Charles Whittingham Memorial Handicap, Turf Classic, Manhattan Handicap.
- Telesto, bay colt, 1999, by Mr. Prospector. Won one race.
- Everchanging, bay filly, 2000, by Kingmambo
- Vitruvian, chestnut colt, 2002, by Lemon Drop Kid. Won one race.
- Bellerophon, chestnut colt, 2003, by Giant's Causeway. Unraced.
- Anticenter, chestnut colt, 2006, by Kingmambo. Won one race.

== Pedigree ==
Pedigree of Aviance (IRE), chestnut mare, 1982
Sire Northfields (USA) 1968	Northern Dancer (CAN); 1961	Nearctic	Nearco
Sire Northfields (USA) 1968	Northern Dancer (CAN); 1961	Nearctic	Lady Angela
Sire Northfields (USA) 1968	Northern Dancer (CAN); 1961	Natalma	Native Dancer
Sire Northfields (USA) 1968	Northern Dancer (CAN); 1961	Natalma	Almahmoud
Sire Northfields (USA) 1968	Little Hut (USA); 1952	Occupy	Bull Dog
Sire Northfields (USA) 1968	Little Hut (USA); 1952	Occupy	Miss Bunting
Sire Northfields (USA) 1968	Little Hut (USA); 1952	Savage Beauty	Challenger
Sire Northfields (USA) 1968	Little Hut (USA); 1952	Savage Beauty	Khara
Dam Minnie Hauk (USA) 1975	Sir Ivor (USA); 1965	Sir Gaylord	Turn-To
Dam Minnie Hauk (USA) 1975	Sir Ivor (USA); 1965	Sir Gaylord	Somethingroyal
Dam Minnie Hauk (USA) 1975	Sir Ivor (USA); 1965	Attica	Mr Trouble
Dam Minnie Hauk (USA) 1975	Sir Ivor (USA); 1965	Attica	Athenia
Dam Minnie Hauk (USA) 1975	Best In Show (USA); 1965	Traffic Judge	Alibhai
Dam Minnie Hauk (USA) 1975	Best In Show (USA); 1965	Traffic Judge	Traffic Court
Dam Minnie Hauk (USA) 1975	Best In Show (USA); 1965	Stolen Hour	Mr Busher
Dam Minnie Hauk (USA) 1975	Best In Show (USA); 1965	Stolen Hour	Late Date (Family 8-f)
