= Mr. Fitz Award =

American horse racing award

- Sport: Horse racing
- Awarded for: "Typifying the spirit of racing"
- Location: U.S.
- Presented by: National Turf Writers Association

History
- First award: 1981
- First winner: Jack Klugman
- Most recent: Perry Ouzts

The Mr. Fitz Award is presented annually by the National Turf Writers and Broadcasters (NTWAB) for typifying the spirit of horse racing. The award is named in honor of Sunny Jim Fitzsimmons.

== History ==
The Mr. Fitz award has been presented since 1981 in honor of the late horse trainer Sunny Jim Fitzsimmons, who trained horses such as 1955 Horse of the Year Nashua and 1957 Horse of the Year Bold Ruler.

The award recognizes an individual who reflects "the spirit of thoroughbred racing." The National Turf Writers Association presents the award at its annual dinner each year.

The first to receive the award was Quincy actor Jack Klugman, owner of Jaklin Klugman, in 1981.

In 1985, John Henry, two-time American Horse of the Year, was the first horse selected by racing writers to receive the Mr. Fitz Award.

== Past recipients ==
- 1981 – (United States) Jack Klugman, Owner-Breeder
- 1982 – (United States) Bill Shoemaker, Jockey; Woody Stephens, Trainer-Owner-Breeder
- 1983 – (United States) Fred W. Hooper, Owner-Breeder
- 1984 – (United States) Penny Chenery, Owner-Breeder
- 1985 – (United States) John Henry, Horse of the Year
- 1986 – (United States) Arlington Park Management
- 1987 – (Panama) Laffit Pincay Jr., Jockey
- 1988 – (United States) Jack Van Berg, Trainer
- 1989 – (United States) Ogden Phipps, Owner-Breeder
- 1990 – (United States) Arthur B. Hancock III, Owner-Breeder
- 1991 – (United States) Frances Genter, Owner-Breeder
- 1992 – (United States) Ron McAnally, Trainer
- 1993 – (Puerto Rico) Ángel Cordero Jr., Jockey
- 1994 – (United States) Jeff Lukas, Trainer
- 1995 – (United States) Jimmy Croll, Trainer
- 1996 – (United States) MacKenzie Miller, Trainer
- 1997 – (United States) Bob Baffert, Trainer
- 1998 – (United States) Joe Hirsch, Journalist
- 1999 – (United States) Robert B. Lewis and Beverly Lewis, Owners
- 2000 – (United States) Pat Day, Jockey
- 2001 – (United States) Allen Jerkens, Trainer
- 2002 – (United States) Chris McCarron, Jockey
- 2003 – (United States) Sackatoga Stable, Owner
- 2004 – (United States) Patricia Cooksey, Jockey
- 2005 – (United States) Nick Zito, Trainer
- 2006 – (United States) Team Barbaro
- 2007 – (United States) Calvin Borel, Jockey
- 2008 – (United States) Luke Kruytbosch, Track Announcer
- 2009 – (United States) Larry Jones, Trainer
- 2010 – (United States) Richard Migliore, Jockey
- 2011 – (United States) Terry Wallace, Track Announcer
- 2012 – (Mexico) Mario Gutierrez, Jockey; Ivan Puhich, Trainer
- 2013 – (Venezuela) Ramon Domínguez, Jockey
- 2014 – (United States) Art Sherman, Trainer
- 2015 – (United States) Team American Pharoah
- 2016 – (United States) Russell Baze, Jockey
- 2017 – (United States) Rick Porter, Owner-Breeder
- 2018 – (United States) Mike Smith, Jockey
- 2019 – (United States) D. Wayne Lukas, Trainer
- 2020 – None
- 2021 – (United States) John Shear, Santa Anita Paddock Captain
- 2022 – (United States) Jim McIngvale, Owner, Philanthropist, Promoter
- 2023 – (United States) Team Cody's Wish
- 2024 – (United States) Team Kenny McPeek
- 2025 – (United States) Perry Ouzts, Jockey

== See also ==
- National Turf Writers Association
