= Steve Haskin =

American journalist (born 1947)

Steve Haskin (born 1947 in New York) is an American horse racing journalist and author. A former Wall Street employee, Haskin became interested in horse racing in 1967. He gained recognition for his annual coverage of the Kentucky Derby, first as National Correspondent for the Daily Racing Form and then as Senior Correspondent at The Blood-Horse until June 2015.

Among his awards are the Walter Haight Award, Charles Englehard Award, and Old Hilltop Award, all for career excellence; he won six Red Smith Awards for Kentucky Derby coverage, two William Leggett Awards for Breeders' Cup coverage, and five First Place American Horse Publications Awards in five different categories. He was elected to the National Museum of Racing Hall of Fame Media Roll of Honor (2016).

== Books ==
Steve Haskin is the author of six books:

- Baffert : Dirt Road to the Derby, co-author with Bob Baffert, Blood-Horse, 1999.
- Dr. Fager: Thoroughbred Legends, Eclipse Press, 2000.
- Horse Racing's Holy Grail: The Epic Quest for the Kentucky Derby, Eclipse Press, 2002.
- Kelso, Eclipse Press, 2003.
- John Henry: Racing's Grand Old Man, Eclipse Press, 2007.
- Tales From the Triple Crown, Eclipse Press, 2008.
