= Ed Schuyler Jr. =

American sports writer

- Born: Edward Schuyler Jr. March 14, 1935 (age 91); Bloomsburg, Pennsylvania, U.S.
- Other names: Fast Eddie; Iron Man of Boxing
- Occupation: Sports writer
- Years active: 1960-2002
- Known for: His work for the Associated Press
- Awards: Nat Fleischer Award (1979); Walter Haight Award (1996); International Boxing Hall of Fame (2010); National Museum of Racing and Hall of Fame (2024)

Ed Schuyler Jr. (born March 14, 1935) is an American retired sports writer who worked for the Associated Press (AP), specializing in horse racing and boxing coverage. He joined the Associated Press in 1960 and served as its national boxing writer from 1970 to 2002 and lead national racing writer from 1974 to 2002.

== Early life and education ==
Edward Schuyler Jr. was born on March 14, 1935, in Bloomsburg, Pennsylvania. He grew up on Ridge Avenue.

He was the son of Edward and Florence Schuyler. His father, Ed Schuyler Sr., had served as sports editor of the Bloomsburg Morning Press.

Following his graduation from Bloomsburg High School in 1953, he began studies at Washington and Lee University, which were briefly suspended during a term of service with the United States Army. His military service in the U.S. Army lasted from September 1954 until September 1956. He graduated from Washington and Lee University in 1960 with a degree in journalism. While still a student, he started working part-time at the Bloomsburg Morning Press, gaining experience in the newsroom, among other duties.

== Career ==
His early experience at a newspaper, coupled with limited success in athletics, led him to follow in his father's footsteps. In the summer of 1960, with his father's assistance, he secured a position as a summer replacement at the Associated Press bureau in Pittsburgh, which transitioned into a full-time role covering sports and general assignments. His father was a close personal friend of the bureau chief of the Associated Press office.

Schuyler was hired by the Associated Press in June 1960 and spent the following 40 years as a journalist focused on horse racing and boxing. His first interview for the Associated Press was a 45-minute sit-down with Pittsburgh Pirates legend Roberto Clemente.

In 1965, the Bloomsburg native transferred from the Pittsburgh bureau to the AP offices in New York City.

Schuyler's signature method involved dictating live fight commentary over the phone as the action unfolded, delivering instant round-by-round coverage to AP. He became known as "Fast Eddie" among AP colleagues and the writers he covered events with due to his reporting style.

=== Boxing ===
Schuyler made his debut in boxing coverage by reporting the September 1963 matchup of Rubin Carter vs. Farid Salim at Pittsburg's Civic Arena. His first championship boxing assignment was when Emile Griffith defeated Dick Tiger over 15 rounds on April 15, 1966.

From 1970 until his retirement, he held the position of national boxing writer for the Associated Press. His coverage included some of the most famous fights in boxing, notably the complete Muhammad Ali vs. Joe Frazier trilogy. He covered the March 1971 Fight of the Century. After covering the 1975 Thrilla in Manila, Schuyler reflected that it was "the best fight I've ever seen." He reported on 23 of Muhammad Ali's bouts for the Associated Press.

Schuyler, the New York-based sportswriter, also covered boxing at the Olympic Games from 1976 through 2000. His international assignments included reporting on bouts in 18 countries. He was dubbed the "Iron Horse" for his unbroken streak in Olympic boxing coverage, reaching 1,615 consecutive bouts by 1992.

On September 15, 1983, he covered his 100th championship fight as a sportswriter for the AP. The title bout featured Boom Boom Mancini and Orlando Romero at Madison Square Garden.

He notably sat ringside for the 1990 Mike Tyson vs. Buster Douglas, witnessing Mike Tyson's upset defeat by knockout to Buster Douglas in Japan. He was later among the first reporters to interview Mike Tyson following the boxer's release from prison in 1995.

Throughout his career, he handled coverage of over 300 world championship bouts and estimated he was ringside for around 6,000 boxing matches.

=== Horse racing ===
The first horse race he reported on for the Associated Press took place in 1966. He first covered the Triple Crown events in 1967, producing a sidebar for that year's Kentucky Derby. He became the Associated Press lead national racing writer in 1974 and held the post through retirement. He reported on every Triple Crown race and the Breeders' Cup from its inaugural 1984 running, chronicling top horses such as Secretariat, Seattle Slew, and Affirmed. He developed a reputation as one of America's top experts on horse racing.

After announcing his retirement, an honorary race named "Ed Schuyler's Last Call" was run at Churchill Downs on May 4, 2001. On May 5, he reported on his last Kentucky Derby. He retired from his post at the Associated Press in March 2002.

The longtime Associated Press correspondent provided coverage for more than 33 Kentucky Derbies and 99 individual Triple Crown events during his career.

Stories by Schuyler made the front pages of major newspapers, including The New York Times, The Washington Post, and the Los Angeles Times.

== Recognition ==
- Nat Fleischer Award for Excellence in Boxing Journalism (1979)
- National Turf Writers Association Walter Haight Award (1996)
- International Boxing Hall of Fame (2010)
- National Museum of Racing and Hall of Fame (2024)
