= Walter Haight (sports journalist) =

American sports writer (1899–1968)

- Born: Walter Dewey Haight; April 11, 1899; Washington, D.C., U.S.
- Died: October 3, 1968 (aged 69); Cheverly, Maryland, U.S.
- Occupation: Sports writer
- Years active: 1923-1968
- Known for: His work for The Washington Post
- Notable work: "Horses and People" column
- Honors: NMRHF Joe Hirsch Media Roll of Honor (2021)

Walter Haight (April 11, 1899 – October 3, 1968) was an American sports writer who worked as the horse racing writer for The Washington Post from 1926 to 1968.

== Early life and education ==
Walter Dewey Haight was born on April 11, 1899, in Washington, D.C.

He graduated from the eighth grade at a public school in June 1913. He attended Business High School (now Roosevelt High School) in Washington before serving as a seaman in the U.S. Navy during World War I.

== Career ==
In December 1915, he was appointed as a temporary messenger boy at the Government Printing Office under Public Printer Cornelius Ford. He resigned as a messenger boy in February 1916.

Haight became a well-experienced sandlot athlete who played on the Metropolitan baseball team and the Washington A.C. football eleven, among other teams. His time as a Metropolitan A.C. fullback concluded in October 1920 after breaking his collarbone in a game against the Mercury A.C.

=== Early journalism ===
His background in sandlot football and amateur baseball opened a newspaper opportunity. His regular submissions of his team's box scores to the sports department led to his eventual appointment as a sandlot sports scribe. By early 1923, he worked as a part-time correspondent at the now-defunct Washington Herald.

Haight became a general assignment reporter at The Washington Post in 1924. His coverage expanded to include wrestling, hockey, and the Washington Redskins, which he began reporting on when the franchise relocated to Washington in the late 1930s.

=== Horse racing coverage ===
He started specializing in thoroughbred horse racing coverage in 1932. His "Horses and People" daily column in The Washington Post attracted racing fans across Maryland and West Virginia. The 1932 Kentucky Derby marked his debut covering the prestigious horse race, beginning a streak of 37 consecutive years of coverage. Haight earned the "No. 1 seat" in the press box at Churchill Downs in Louisville, Kentucky, during the 1960s, having attended more consecutive Kentucky Derbys than any other racing writer.

He helped found the Maryland Racing Writers' Association in 1937 and served as its president.

When baseball pitcher Bert Shepard took the mound for the Washington Senators in 1945, he covered the story and personally drove Shepard to Griffith Stadium for the first time.

By the early 1950s, he began doubling as a public address announcer. He called the races over the public address system at the Maryland and Charles Town tracks.

He held the position of vice president of the National Turf Writers Association in 1966.

The veteran racing writer spent 45 years as a member of The Washington Post sports department.

== Death ==
Walter Haight died in Cheverly, Maryland, on October 3, 1968, at 69.

== Personal life ==
His son was Raymond Tennyson Haight, a racetrack announcer.

== Legacy ==
Early in his career, Haight received an invitation to the White House on New Year's Day from President William Howard Taft, who rewarded him with a $5 gift for his work.

During the 1940s, Alan T. Clarke named one of his horses after the turf writer.

The Walter Haight Memorial Handicap was inaugurated at Laurel Race Course in October 1968, becoming an annual race held in his honor.

The National Turf Writers Association honored his legacy in 1972 with the Walter Haight Award "for Career Excellence in Turf Writing."

The National Museum of Racing and Hall of Fame posthumously honored Haight in 2021 with selection to the Joe Hirsch Media Roll of Honor.
