= Pathfork =

American-bred Thoroughbred racehorse

- Sire: Distorted Humor
- Grandsire: Forty Niner
- Dam: Visions of Clarity
- Damsire: Sadler's Wells
- Sex: Stallion
- Foaled: 12 March 2008
- Country: United States
- Colour: Bay
- Breeder: Flaxman Holdings
- Owner: Silverton Hill Partnership
- Trainer: Jessica Harrington; John W. Sadler
- Record: 6: 3-0-0
- Earnings: £165,217

Major wins
- Futurity Stakes (2010); National Stakes (2010)

Awards
- Top-rated two-year-old in Ireland

Pathfork (foaled 12 March 2008) is an American-bred Thoroughbred racehorse and sire. He was the top-rated two-year-old in Ireland when he won all three of his starts including the Futurity Stakes and National Stakes. In the following spring he was regarded as one of the few colts in Europe capable of challenging Frankel but finished unplaced behind the English champion in the 2000 Guineas and did not race again that year. In 2012 he was campaigned in California but made no impact in two starts before his track career was ended by injury. He was retired from racing to become a breeding stallion in South Africa.

== Background ==
Pathfork is a bay horse with a white star bred in Kentucky by Flaxman Holdings, a company owned by the Niarchos family. In September 2009, the yearling was consigned to the Keeneland Association sale and was bought for $230,000 by the Silverton Hill partnership. The colt was sent to Ireland and entered training with Jessica Harrington at Moone in County Kildare.

His sire Distorted Humor was a successful racehorse, but just below top-class, scoring his biggest wins at Grade II level. As a breeding stallion he made an immediate impact by siring Funny Cide in his first crop of foals and went on to get numerous major winners including Drosselmeyer, Commentator, Flower Alley and Any Given Saturday. Pathfork's dam Visions of Clarity showed considerable ability as a racehorse, winning the Listed Prix Bagatelle over 1600 metres at Maisons-Laffitte Racecourse in 2003. She was a half-sister to Spinning World and, as a granddaughter of Aviance, closely related to many good horses including Chimes of Freedom, Aldebaran (American Champion Sprint Horse), Dietrich (King George Stakes), Saddex (Rheinland-Pokal) and Denon (Hollywood Derby).

== Racing career ==
=== 2010: two-year-old season ===
On his first racecourse appearance Pathfork started the 9/2 second favourite in a fourteen-runner maiden race over seven furlongs at the Curragh on 18 July. Ridden by Shane Foley he took the lead a furlong from the finish and drew away to win "comfortably" to win by four lengths from the Aidan O'Brien-trained favourite Robin Hood. Fran Berry took over the ride when the colt was stepped up to Group 3 class for the Futurity Stakes over the same course and distance on 21 August and started the 10/11 favourite ahead of the Jim Bolger-trained Glor Na Mara (runner-up in the Phoenix Stakes). He was always among the leaders, before going to the front entering the last quarter mile and kept on well in the closing stages to win by one and a half lengths from Glor Na Mara. After the race Harrington said "He just jumped out and got a great position, Fran said he was always cruising. He's such a laid-back horse, he's brilliant with an amazing temperament. Fran said he was only getting going at the end. We'll discuss with the owners as regards future plans for him".

With Berry again in the saddle, Pathfork was one of nine colts to contest the Group 1 National Stakes at the Curragh on 11 September and started 2/1 second choice in the betting behind Zoffany. The best-fancied of the other runners were Glor Na Mara, Janood (winner of the Washington Singer Stakes) and Casamento. Pathfork raced in third place before moving up to join the leader Casamento entering the last quarter-mile. The two colts drew away from their rivals with Pathfork prevailing by a head after a sustained struggle in the closing stages. Jessica Harrington commented "Fran said he had to be really tough and that he didn't really like the ground. Pure class got him there in the end and it's just fantastic. I felt sick beforehand and my panic during the race was that he was in front for so long... He did have a very hard race there". Despite reports that he was likely to run on dirt in the Breeders' Cup Juvenile he did not run again in 2010.

=== 2011: three-year-old season ===
On his three-year-old debut Pathfork was sent to England to contest the 2000 Guineas over the Rowley Mile course at Newmarket Racecourse on 30 April and was made the 8/1 second choice in the betting behind the odds-on favourite Frankel. In the build-up to the race Jessica Harrington said "Everything's fine with Pathfork. I’m happy with him, he's developed well over the winter. Everything's worked out well so far" but admitted that Frankel was an "awesome" opponent. In the race Pathfork never looked likely to get into contention and came home seventh, twenty-six lengths behind the winner.

Pathfork had injury problems which kept him off the track for the rest of the season. At the end of the year he was transferred to the United States and entered the training stable of John W. Sadler.

=== 2011: four-year-old season ===
In 2011 Pathfork was ridden in both of his races by Joel Rosario. On 4 February at Santa Anita Park the colt made his first appearance for his new trainer and finished sixth of seven runners behind Mr Commons in the Grade II Arcadia Handicap. A month later he was dropped in class for an allowance race at the same track in which he started favourite but came home last of the six runners.

== Stud record ==
At the end of his racing career Pathfork was retired to become a breeding stallion at the Highlands Stud Farm in South Africa.

== Pedigree ==
Pedigree of Pathfork, bay stallion, 2008
Sire Distorted Humor (USA) 1993	Forty Niner (USA); 1985	Mr. Prospector	Raise a Native
Sire Distorted Humor (USA) 1993	Forty Niner (USA); 1985	Mr. Prospector	Gold Digger
Sire Distorted Humor (USA) 1993	Forty Niner (USA); 1985	File	Tom Rolfe
Sire Distorted Humor (USA) 1993	Forty Niner (USA); 1985	File	Continue
Sire Distorted Humor (USA) 1993	Danzig's Beauty (USA); 1987	Danzig	Northern Dancer
Sire Distorted Humor (USA) 1993	Danzig's Beauty (USA); 1987	Danzig	Pas De Nom
Sire Distorted Humor (USA) 1993	Danzig's Beauty (USA); 1987	Sweetest Chant	Mr. Leader
Sire Distorted Humor (USA) 1993	Danzig's Beauty (USA); 1987	Sweetest Chant	Gay Sonnet
Dam Visions of Clarity (IRE) 2000	Sadler's Wells (USA); 1981	Northern Dancer	Nearctic
Dam Visions of Clarity (IRE) 2000	Sadler's Wells (USA); 1981	Northern Dancer	Natalma
Dam Visions of Clarity (IRE) 2000	Sadler's Wells (USA); 1981	Fairy Bridge	Bold Reason
Dam Visions of Clarity (IRE) 2000	Sadler's Wells (USA); 1981	Fairy Bridge	Special
Dam Visions of Clarity (IRE) 2000	Imperfect Circle (USA); 1988	Riverman	Never Bend
Dam Visions of Clarity (IRE) 2000	Imperfect Circle (USA); 1988	Riverman	River Lady
Dam Visions of Clarity (IRE) 2000	Imperfect Circle (USA); 1988	Aviance	Northfields
Dam Visions of Clarity (IRE) 2000	Imperfect Circle (USA); 1988	Aviance	Minnie Hauk (Family: 8-f)

- Pathfork was inbred 3 × 4 to Northern Dancer, meaning that this stallion appears in both the third and fourth generations of his pedigree.
