= Patrick Kane (disambiguation) =

Patrick Kane (born 1988) is an American professional ice hockey player.

Patrick Kane or Pat Kane may also refer to:

- Pat Kane (pickleball), American 2022 Pickleball Hall of Fame inductee
- Pat Kane (born 1964), Scottish musician, journalist, political activist
- Patrick J. Kane (1927–2021), member of the South Dakota House of Representatives

== See also ==
- Patrick Cain (1962–2016), American football player
