= Walter Haight Award =

American horse racing award

- Sport: Horse racing
- Awarded for: "Career excellence in turf writing"
- Location: U.S.
- Presented by: National Turf Writers Association

History
- First award: 1972
- First winner: Jimmy Doyle
- Most recent: Steve Andersen

The Walter Haight Award is an award conferred annually by the National Turf Writers And Broadcasters (NTWAB) for career excellence in turf writing. The award is named after Walter Haight, former racing reporter of the Washington Post.

== History ==
Established in 1972, the award honors sports journalist Walter Haight. It is presented each year at the annual dinner of the National Turf Writers Association.

The Walter Haight Award began as a recognition of the year's outstanding training achievement, with the first presentation made in 1969 for achievements in 1968. It was later dedicated to turf writers who had made a distinguished contribution to the profession of covering thoroughbred racing. Its first recipient was American sportswriter Jimmy Doyle of the Cleveland Plain Dealer.

== Past recipients ==
- 1972 – (United States) Jimmy Doyle
- 1973 – (Canada) George F. T. Ryall (Audax Minor)
- 1974 – (United States) Raleigh Burroughs
- 1975 – (United States) Don Fair
- 1976 – (United States) Saul Rosen
- 1977 – (United States) Red Smith
- 1978 – (United States) Nelson Fisher
- 1979 – (United States) Barney Nagler
- 1980 – (United States) Joe Nichols
- 1981 – (United States) Bill Robertson
- 1982 – (United States) Joe Agrella
- 1983 – (United States) Fred Russell
- 1984 – (United States) Joe Hirsch
- 1985 – (United States) Sam McCracken
- 1986 – (United States) Ed Comerford
- 1987 – (United States) Si Burick
- 1988 – (United States) Leon Rasmussen
- 1989 – (United States) William Leggett
- 1990 – (United States) Kent Hollingsworth
- 1991 – (United States) Bob Harding
- 1992 – (United States) Mike Barry, Bill Nack
- 1993 – (United States) Jack Mann
- 1994 – (United States) Edward L. Bowen
- 1995 – (United States) Jay Hovdey
- 1996 – (United States) Ed Schuyler Jr.
- 1997 – (United States) Jim Bolus
- 1998 – (United States) Andrew Beyer
- 1999 – (United States) Jennie Rees
- 2000 – (United States) Bill Christine
- 2001 – (United States) Gary West
- 2002 – (United States) Billy Reed
- 2003 – (United States) Russ Harris
- 2004 – (United States) Steve Haskin
- 2005 – (United States) Jay Privman
- 2006 – (United States) Steven Crist
- 2007 – (United States) Dick Jerardi
- 2008 – (United States) Maryjean Wall
- 2009 – (United States) Dan Farley
- 2010 – (United States) Neil Milbert
- 2011 – (United States) David Grening
- 2012 – (United States) Bill Mooney
- 2013 – (United States) Bob Fortus
- 2014 – (United States) Tom LaMarra
- 2015 – (United States) Tim Layden
- 2016 – (United States) Hank Wesch
- 2017 – (United States) Matt Hegarty
- 2018 – (United States) Marty McGee
- 2019 – (United States) Tim Wilkin
- 2020 – (United States) None
- 2021 – (United States) Lenny Shulman
- 2022 – (United States) Tom Pedulla
- 2023 – (United States) Mike Kane
- 2024 – (United States) Sean Clancy
- 2025 – (United States) Steve Andersen

== See also ==
- National Turf Writers Association
