= Big Sport of Turfdom Award =

The Big Sport of Turfdom Award has been given annually by the Turf Publicists of America since 1966 to a person or group who enhances coverage of Thoroughbred racing through cooperation with the media and Thoroughbred racing publicists.

The Turf Publicists of America, founded in 1951, is made up of approximately 180 Thoroughbred racing publicists and marketing executives at various racetracks throughout North America with the shared goal of promoting the sport of Thoroughbred racing.

Two-time recipients of the Big Sport of Turfdom Award include Penny Chenery (1973 and 2017), Laffit Pincay Jr. (1985 and 2000), Bob Baffert (1997 and 2015, the latter as part of Team American Pharoah), Mike Smith (2014 and 2015, the former as part of Team Zenyatta), and Ken McPeek (2002 and 2024).

== List of Big Sport of Turfdom Award winners ==
- 2025 – Griffin Johnson
- 2024 – Ken McPeek
- 2023 – Jena Antonucci
- 2022 – Cody Dorman, namesake of Cody's Wish
- 2021 – Brad Cox
- 2020 – Tom Amoss
- 2019 – Mark Casse
- 2018 – John Asher
- 2017 – Penny Chenery
- 2016 – Art Sherman
- 2015 – Team American Pharoah: Zayat Stables, Bob Baffert, Victor Espinoza
- 2014 – Tom Durkin
- 2013 – Gary Stevens
- 2012 – Dale Romans
- 2011 – H. Graham Motion
- 2010 – Mike E. Smith
- 2009 – Team Zenyatta: Ann & Jerry Moss, John Shirreffs, Dottie Shirreffs, Mike E. Smith
- 2008 – J. Larry Jones
- 2007 – Carl Nafzger
- 2006 – Dr. Dean Richardson
- 2005 – Pat Day
- 2004 – John Servis
- 2003 – Sackatoga Stable
- 2002 – Ken and Sue McPeek
- 2001 – Laura Hillenbrand
- 2000 – Laffit Pincay Jr.
- 1999 – D. Wayne Lukas
- 1998 – Michael E. Pegram
- 1997 – Bob Baffert
- 1996 – Team Cigar: Allen E. Paulson, William I. Mott, Jerry Bailey
- 1995 – Robert and Beverly Lewis
- 1994 – Warren A. Croll Jr.
- 1993 – Chris McCarron
- 1992 – Ángel Cordero Jr.
- 1991 – Hammer and Oaktown Stable
- 1990 – Carl Nafzger
- 1989 – Tim Conway
- 1988 – Julie Krone
- 1987 – Jack Van Berg
- 1986 – Jim McKay
- 1985 – Laffit Pincay Jr.
- 1984 – John Henry
- 1983 – Joe Hirsch
- 1982 – Woody Stephens
- 1981 – John Forsythe
- 1980 – Jack Klugman
- 1979 – Laz Barrera
- 1978 – Ron Turcotte
- 1977 – Steve Cauthen
- 1976 – Telly Savalas
- 1975 – Francis P. Dunne
- 1974 – Eddie Arcaro
- 1973 – Penny Chenery
- 1972 – John W. Galbreath
- 1971 – Burt Bacharach
- 1970 – Saul Rosen (jockey)
- 1969 – Bill Shoemaker
- 1968 – John A. Nerud
- 1967 – Allaire du Pont
- 1966 – E.P. Taylor
