= Johnny D. =

American-bred Thoroughbred racehorse

- Sire: Stage Door Johnny
- Grandsire: Prince John
- Dam: Dusk
- Damsire: Olden Times
- Sex: Gelding
- Foaled: 1974
- Country: United States
- Colour: Dark Brown
- Breeder: Miss Peggy Augustus
- Owner: Dana S. Bray, Jr.
- Trainer: Michael Kay
- Record: 17: 7-2-6
- Earnings: US$$371,256

Major wins
- Washington, D.C. International Stakes (1977); Turf Classic Invitational Stakes (1977); Lexington Handicap (1977)

Awards
- American Champion Male Turf Horse (1977)

Johnny D. (foaled in 1974) was an American Thoroughbred racehorse. He was bred in Virginia by Miss Peggy Augustus and raced under the Dana Bray banner as his owner. He finished racing with a record of 7–2–6 in 17 starts with career earnings of $371,256. Johnny D. was best known for his wins in the grade one Washington, D.C. International Stakes and the grade one Turf Classic Invitational Stakes. Although he raced for several years, 1977 is when he won all but his maiden race including his two grade one turf races. That same year he was named the country's top grass equine by being voted 1977 American Champion Male Turf Horse honors.

== Two-year-old career ==
Johnny D. was a very late developing thoroughbred. As a two-year-old Johnny D. only raced four times, he placed third in twice and won a maiden race that year. He finished the year with an annual record of 1–0–2 in 4 starts.

== Three-year-old career ==
Early in his three-year-old season, Johnny D. had moderate success in competition, but not in stakes races. Following a sixth-place finish on dirt in the Peter Pan Stakes, he was switched from dirt racing to grass racing, and began to improve. He won four turf races in a row, culminating with a victory in July, in the Lexington Handicap, a Grade II race formerly held at Belmont Park for three-year-olds on the turf (not to be confused with the Lexington Stakes, another stakes race for three-year-olds, run at Keeneland in April).

After winning an overnight handicap at Saratoga Race Course in August, he returned to Belmont in the fall, running third in the Grade II Lawrence Realization Stakes against three-year-olds, then trying older horses in graded stakes for the first time, in the Grade I Man o' War Stakes, where again he ran third. With the confidence that he could hold his own against older horses on turf, Johnny D. was shipped up to Canada to run in the Canadian International Stakes, a prestigious Grade I race run at Woodbine Racecourse in Toronto, Ontario, Canada. There, he ran third to future National Museum of Racing and Hall of Fame inductee Exceller.

In November, he was sent to another prestigious international stakes race, the D.C. International at Laurel Park. Facing another top international field of grass horses, he was sent off at 10–1. The French import Crow took the early lead in the mile and a half race, but entering the backstretch, Johnny D. surged to the front, opening up a lead on the field by as many as ten lengths, before easing up towards the finish and defeating Majestic Light and Exceller over a soft turf course.

In his final start of 1977, Johnny D. returned to New York for a start in the inaugural Aqueduct Turf Classic Invitational Stakes, as it was known then before being renamed for famed turf writer Joe Hirsch in 2004. Facing Majestic Light, Exceller and Crow, among other entrants, once more Johnny D. went to the front, but faced a stiffer challenge from Majestic Light this time. The two horses dueled throughout the final half of the race, before Johnny D. pulled clear in the last quarter-mile, winning by almost 4 lengths. His jockey for these later races was Steve Cauthen, who would become better known in 1978 for being the jockey of Triple Crown champion Affirmed.

For his grass racing successes that fall, Johnny D. was named Champion Male Turf Horse at the Eclipse Awards.

== Later career ==
After his three-year-old campaign came to an end in 1977, Johnny D. suffered a string of injuries that proved difficult to overcome. Every time he seemed ready to return to the races, there would be a setback, causing him to be kept out of action for what eventually turned into a 45-month layoff. "But I knew he had the talent and great heart" to return to racing, said Dana S. Bray, his owner.

Finally, on August 3, 1981, Johnny D. returned to the track at Saratoga, for his first race since his win in the 1977 Aqueduct Turf Classic. Now trained by Laz Barrera, Johnny D. was off slow in his return, made up ground on the backstretch, then tired and faded to last of nine horses. Following that effort, Johnny D. was retired from racing.
