= Dead Certain (horse) =

British-bred Thoroughbred racehorse

- Racing silks of Commander G G Marten
- Sire: Absalom
- Grandsire: Abwah
- Dam: Sirnelta
- Damsire: Sir Tor
- Sex: Mare
- Foaled: 19 March 1987
- Country: United Kingdom
- Colour: Bay
- Breeder: Fulke Johnson Houghton
- Owner: Toby Marten
- Trainer: David Elsworth
- Record: 12: 5-3-0
- Earnings: £253,923

Major wins
- Queen Mary Stakes (1989); Lowther Stakes (1989); Cheveley Park Stakes (1989); Prix Maurice de Gheest (1990)

Dead Certain (19 March 1987 – 2008) was a British Thoroughbred racehorse and broodmare. In a racing career which lasted from May 1989 until September 1990 she won five of her twelve races. She was one of the best two-year-old fillies in Britain in 1989 when she won four of her six races including the Queen Mary Stakes, Lowther Stakes and Cheveley Park Stakes. In the following year she competed mainly in sprint races and recorded another major success when she won the Prix Maurice de Gheest. After her retirement from racing she had some success as a broodmare. Her last foal was born in 2008.

== Background ==
Dead Certain was a bay mare with no white markings bred in the United Kingdom by Fulke Johnson Houghton. She was sired by Absalom, a grey sprinter who won the Cornwallis Stakes in 1977, the Haydock Sprint Cup in 1978 and the Diadem Stakes in 1979. The best of Absalom's other progeny was probably Absalom's Lady, a leading National Hunt mare who won the Christmas Hurdle in 1994. Dead Certain's dam Sirnelta won three races over middle distances and produced several other winners including Fire Top, who won twelve races. Sirnelta was a great-granddaughter of Satanella, a broodmare whose other descendants have included Chief Singer, Winged Love and Pleasantly Perfect.

During her racing career, Dead Certain was owned by Commander G G "Toby" Marten and trained by David Elsworth (best known for handling the outstanding steeplechaser Desert Orchid) at Whitsbury near Fordingbridge in Hampshire. Dead Certain was a very temperamental and difficult filly to train: Elsworth recalled "She was the kind that you really needed to keep a lid on, Peter Maughan and Rodney Boult (senior members of the stable staff) did a great job, otherwise she'd have boiled over".

== Racing career ==
=== 1989: two-year-old season ===
Dead Certain began her racing career in the five furlong Lady Caroline Stakes at Windsor Racecourse on 8 May 1989 in which she started 11/10 favourite but was beaten two lengths into second by the Richard Hannon-trained Between the Sticks. Two weeks later she started favourite for a maiden race over the same distance at Salisbury Racecourse and recorded her first success, leading from the start and accelerating in the final furlong to win by one and a half lengths from Love Returned, with a gap of eight lengths back to the other five runners. On her next appearance the filly was moved up in class for the Group Three Queen Mary Stakes at Royal Ascot in June. The National Stakes winner Princess Taufan started favourite ahead of Shagudine and Please Believe Me with Dead Certain, ridden by Steve Cauthen fourth choice on 8/1. She was among the leaders from the start, went to the front two furlongs out and won by one and a half lengths from Please Believe Me with Performing Arts in third.

In the Cherry Hinton Stakes at Newmarket Racecourse in July, Dead Certain was moved up to six furlongs for the first time and started third favourite behind the highly regarded Chimes of Freedom. Ridden by Ray Cochrane she took the lead in the closing stages but was caught on the line and beaten a short head by Chimes of Freedom, to whom she was conceding five pounds. Cauthen resumed the ride when the filly started 5/4 favourite for the Group Two Lowther Stakes at York Racecourse on 24 August. Princess Taufan and Please Believe Me were again in opposition as well as the Princess Margaret Stakes runner-up Routilante and the Michael Stoute-trained Fire and Shade. Dead Certain took the lead from the start, drew away in last quarter mile and won "comfortably" by two and half lengths from Routilante.

On 4 October at Newmarket, Dead Certain was one of an eleven horse field to contest the Cheveley Park Stakes, which was then the only Group One race in Britain restricted to juvenile fillies. Chimes of Freedom started favourite after following up her win in the Cherry Hinton with a victory in the Moyglare Stud Stakes. Dead Certain was the 11/2 second choice in the betting whilst the other runners included Kissogram Girl, Mademoiselle Chloe (Harry Rosebery Challenge Trophy), Haunting Beauty (Molecomb Stakes) and Tabdea (Firth of Clyde Stakes). Ridden by Cash Asmussen, she started quickly before settling in second place behind In The Papers. She took the lead two furlongs out and stayed on strongly in the closing stages to win by three quarters of a length from Line of Thunder with Chimes of Freedom a head away in third.

=== 1990: three-year-old season ===
On her three-year-old debut, Dead Certain was stepped up in distance for the Fred Darling Stakes (a trial race for the 1000 Guineas) over seven furlongs at Newbury Racecourse in April. She started favourite but after leading for five furlongs she dropped back and finished tailed-off last of the eight runners behind Salsabil. After a two-month break the filly returned to sprinting and was matched against colts and older horses in the Cork and Orrery Stakes at Royal Ascot. She led throughout the race but was caught in the final strides and beaten a head by the four-year-old colt Great Commotion. She was then moved up to the highest class for the Group One July Cup at Newmarket and finished sixth of the nine runners behind Royal Academy. In August, Dead Certain was sent to France for the Prix Maurice de Gheest (then a Group Two race) over 1300 metres at Deauville Racecourse. Her four opponents were Machiavellian, Rock City (Gimcrack Stakes), Whippet and Pole Position (Prix Eclipse). Ridden by Asmussen, she took the lead 300 metres from the finish and won by a length and a short head from Rock City and Pole Position.

Dead Certain failed to reproduce her best form in her last two races. In the Haydock Sprint Cup on 8 September she started third favourite behind Dayjur and Royal Academy but refused to co-operate with her jockey Alan Munro, throwing her head in the air and finishing tailed-off last of the nine runners. In the Diadem Stakes three weeks later she ran well for half a mile but faded quickly and finished twelfth of the fourteen runners behind the French-trained colt Ron's Victory.

== Breeding record ==
Dead Certain was retired from racing to become a broodmare. She produced thirteen foals and nine winners between 1992 and her death in 2008:

- Full Cover, a bay colt (later gelded) foaled in 1992, sired by Thatching. Failed to win in five races.
- Supreme Bases, bay colt (later gelded), 1993, by Sadler's Wells. Won two races.
- Dead Aim, bay colt (later gelded), 1994, by Sadler's Wells. Won one race.
- Dodo, bay filly, 1995, by Alzao. Won one race.
- Deadly Nightshade, bay filly, 1996, by Night Shift. Won two races.
- True Night, bay colt (later gelded), 1997, by Night Shift. Won twelve races.
- Certainly Brave, bay filly, 1999, by Indian Ridge. Failed to win in five races.
- Night Speed, chestnut colt, 2000, by Night Shift. Won one race.
- Palatinate, bay colt (later gelded), 2002, by Desert Prince. Won one race.
- Sinduda, bay filly, 2003, by Anabaa. Won one race.
- Rio Novo, bay colt (later gelded), 2005, by Nayef. Failed to win under rules, but won three times on the amateur Point-to-point circuit.
- Phoenix Rising, bay filly, 2006, by Dr Fong. Failed to win in three races.
- Dead Cool, chestnut filly, 2008, by Kyllachy. Won two races.

== Pedigree ==
Pedigree of Dead Certain (GB), bay mare, 1987
Sire Absalom (GB) 1975	Abwah (GB); 1969	Abernant	Owen Tudor
Sire Absalom (GB) 1975	Abwah (GB); 1969	Abernant	Rustom Mahal
Sire Absalom (GB) 1975	Abwah (GB); 1969	The Creditor	Crepello
Sire Absalom (GB) 1975	Abwah (GB); 1969	The Creditor	The Accused
Sire Absalom (GB) 1975	Shadow Queen (GB); 1965	Darius	Dante
Sire Absalom (GB) 1975	Shadow Queen (GB); 1965	Darius	Yasna
Sire Absalom (GB) 1975	Shadow Queen (GB); 1965	Shadow	Alycidon
Sire Absalom (GB) 1975	Shadow Queen (GB); 1965	Shadow	Sunshade
Dam Sirnelta (FR) 1971	Sir Tor (USA); 1963	Round Table	Princequillo
Dam Sirnelta (FR) 1971	Sir Tor (USA); 1963	Round Table	Knights Daughter
Dam Sirnelta (FR) 1971	Sir Tor (USA); 1963	Never Too Late	Never Say Die
Dam Sirnelta (FR) 1971	Sir Tor (USA); 1963	Never Too Late	Gloria Nicky
Dam Sirnelta (FR) 1971	Finelta (FR); 1959	Fine Top	Fine Art
Dam Sirnelta (FR) 1971	Finelta (FR); 1959	Fine Top	Toupie
Dam Sirnelta (FR) 1971	Finelta (FR); 1959	Sanelta	Tourment
Dam Sirnelta (FR) 1971	Finelta (FR); 1959	Sanelta	Satanella (Family: 16-a)
