= Chimes of Freedom (horse) =

American-bred Thoroughbred racehorse

- Racing silks of Stavros Niarchos
- Sire: Private Account
- Grandsire: Damascus
- Dam: Aviance
- Damsire: Northfields
- Sex: Mare
- Foaled: 23 January 1987
- Country: United States
- Colour: Chestnut
- Breeder: Flaxman Holdings
- Owner: Stavros Niarchos
- Trainer: Henry Cecil
- Record: 9: 6-0-1
- Earnings: £294,039

Major wins
- Cherry Hinton Stakes (1989); Moyglare Stud Stakes (1989); Coronation Stakes (1990); Child Stakes (1990)

Chimes of Freedom (23 January 1987 – 2014) was an American-bred British-trained Thoroughbred racehorse and broodmare. Bred in Kentucky by her owner Stavros Niarchos she was sent to race in England where she was trained by Henry Cecil. She was one of the best juvenile fillies of her generation in Europe, winning four of her five races including the Cherry Hinton Stakes in Britain and the Moyglare Stud Stakes in Ireland. In the following year she did not contest any of the classics but recorded major victories in the Coronation Stakes and the Child Stakes. After being retired at the end of the season she became a highly successful broodmare, producing several major winners.

== Background ==
Chimes of Freedom was a chestnut mare with a small white star and a white sock on her right front foot bred in Kentucky by Flaxman Holdings, the breeding company of her owner Stavros Niarchos. She was trained throughout her racing career by Henry Cecil at his Warren Place stable in Newmarket, Suffolk and was ridden in all of her races by Steve Cauthen.

She was sired by Private Account a top-class performer on dirt in the United States who won the Gulfstream Park Handicap and the Widener Handicap in 1980. He later became a very successful breeding stallion who showed a particular aptitude for siring racemares: the best of his offspring included Personal Ensign, East of the Moon and Inside Information. Chimes of Freedom's dam Aviance won the Phoenix Stakes for Robert Sangster in 1984 and was later sold privately to Niarchos. Aviance produced several other winners including Denon (Hollywood Derby, Charles Whittingham Memorial Handicap, Turf Classic, Manhattan Handicap), and Imperfect Circle (dam of Spinning World). Aviance was a granddaughter of the influential broodmare Best In Show, whose other descendants included El Gran Senor, Try My Best, Xaar, Jazil, Rags to Riches and Redoute's Choice.

== Racing career ==
=== 1989: two-year-old season ===
Chimes of Freedom began her racing career in a six furlong maiden race at Lingfield Park Racecourse on 27 May. She started 4/11 favourite against seven opponents and won easily by six lengths. Nineteen days later she beat two rivals in the Kingsclere Stakes over the same distance at Newbury Racecourse at odds of 1/4. On 11 July the filly was stepped up in class for the Group Three Cherry Hinton Stakes at Newmarket Racecourse and started 4/9 favourite in an eight-runner field. Her challengers included Dead Certain and Please Believe Me who had finished first and second in the Queen Mary Stakes at Royal Ascot. After chasing the leaders she finished strongly but it was only in the final stride that she caught Dead Certain (who was carrying a five-pound weight penalty for her Ascot victory) to win by a short head.

In September Chimes of Freedom was sent to Ireland for the Group One Moyglare Stud Stakes at the Curragh and started second favourite behind Pharaoh's Delight, a British-trained filly who had won the Princess Margaret Stakes and the Phoenix Stakes. Chimes of Freedom produced her best performance up to that time, moving up alongside Pharaoh's Delight two furlongs out before drawing away to win by six lengths. On her final appearance of the season, Chimes of Freedom started favourite for Britain's most prestigious race for juvenile fillies, the Cheveley Park Stakes over six furlongs at Newmarket. In a blanket finish in which the first five finishers were separated by one and a half lengths, she finished third of the eleven runners behind Dead Certain and Line of Thunder.

=== 1990: three-year-old season ===
On her first appearance as a three-year-old Chimes of Freedom started second favourite behind Dead Certain in the Fred Darling Stakes (a trial for the 1000 Guineas) at Newbury. Although Dead Certain ran poorly and finished tailed-off, Chimes of Freedom never looked likely to win and finished fourth of the eight runners behind Salsabil, Haunting Beauty and London Pride.

After a break of two months, Chimes of Freedom was one of seven fillies to contest the 141st renewal of the Coronation Stakes at Royal Ascot and was made the 11/2 fourth choice in the betting. The favourite was Heart of Joy who had won the Nell Gwyn Stakes before finishing second in both the 1000 Guineas and the Irish 1000 Guineas whilst the other contenders included Pharaoh's Delight and the highly regarded Harry Thomson Jones-trained Hasbah. The filly was restrained by Cauthen in the early stages and turned into the straight in fourth place behind Hasbah, Water Well and Heart of Joy. She moved forward in the straight to take the lead a furlong out and accelerated clear of the field to win "easily" by five lengths from Hasbah, with Heart of oy a length and a half away in third place. On 11 July Chimes of Freedom started 4/6 for the Group Two Child Stakes (now the Group One Falmouth Stakes) at Newmarket for which her rivals included Hasbah and the four-year-old Aldbourne. After being held up by Cauthen, she took the lead approaching the final furlong and drew away to win by two and a half lengths from the Dick Hern-trained Arousal with Hasbah in third.

A month after her win at Newmarket, Chimes of Freedom was sent to France and was matched against colts and older horses in the Prix Jacques Le Marois at Deauville. She was amongst the leaders until the last 400 metres but then weakened and finished seventh of the ten runners behind Priolo.

== Breeding record ==
Chimes of Freedom was retired from racing to become a broodmare for Flaxman Holdings in Kentucky. She produced at least eleven foals and six winners between 1993 and 2008:

- Wind of Roses, a chestnut filly, foaled in 1993, sired by Lomond. Unraced.
- Tomisue's Indy, chestnut filly, 1994, by A.P. Indy. Won six races.
- Slievenamon, chestnut colt, 1995, by Seeking the Gold. Won one race.
- Good Journey, chestnut colt, 1996, by Nureyev. Earned $1.7 million and won seven races including the Atto Mile, Citation Handicap (twice) and Firecracker Handicap.
- Aldebaran, bay colt, 1998, by Mr. Prospector. Earned $1.7 million and won eight races including the San Carlos Handicap, Metropolitan Handicap, Forego Handicap, Churchill Downs Handicap, Tom Fool Handicap. 2003 American Champion Sprint Horse.
- Sea of Showers, bay filly, 1999, by Seattle Slew. Won four races including the Jenny Wiley Stakes.
- Borobudur, bay colt, 2003, by Kingmambo. Won two races.
- Modesty Blaise, bay filly, 2004, by A.P. Indy. Failed to win in six races.
- Best Project, chestnut colt, 2005, by Kingmambo. Raced in Japan.
- Arithmancer, bay colt, 2007, by Kingmambo. Failed to win in two races.
- White Curtain, chestnut colt, 2008, by Mingun. Failed to win in two races.

Chimes of Freedom died in 2014.

== Pedigree ==
Pedigree of Chimes of Freedom (USA), chestnut mare 1987
Sire Private Account (USA) 1976	Damascus (USA); 1964	Sword Dancer	Sunglow
Sire Private Account (USA) 1976	Damascus (USA); 1964	Sword Dancer	Highland Fling
Sire Private Account (USA) 1976	Damascus (USA); 1964	Kerala	My Babu
Sire Private Account (USA) 1976	Damascus (USA); 1964	Kerala	Blade Of Time
Sire Private Account (USA) 1976	Numbered Account (USA); 1969	Buckpasser	Tom Fool
Sire Private Account (USA) 1976	Numbered Account (USA); 1969	Buckpasser	Busanda
Sire Private Account (USA) 1976	Numbered Account (USA); 1969	Intriguing	Swaps
Sire Private Account (USA) 1976	Numbered Account (USA); 1969	Intriguing	Glamour
Dam Aviance (IRE) 1982	Northfields (USA); 1968	Northern Dancer	Nearctic
Dam Aviance (IRE) 1982	Northfields (USA); 1968	Northern Dancer	Natalma
Dam Aviance (IRE) 1982	Northfields (USA); 1968	Little Hut	Occupy
Dam Aviance (IRE) 1982	Northfields (USA); 1968	Little Hut	Savage Beauty
Dam Aviance (IRE) 1982	Minnie Hauk (USA); 1975	Sir Ivor	Sir Gaylord
Dam Aviance (IRE) 1982	Minnie Hauk (USA); 1975	Sir Ivor	Attica
Dam Aviance (IRE) 1982	Minnie Hauk (USA); 1975	Best In Show	Traffic Judge
Dam Aviance (IRE) 1982	Minnie Hauk (USA); 1975	Best In Show	Stolen Hour (Family 8-f)
