= Sunshine Forever =

American-bred Thoroughbred racehorse

- Sire: Roberto
- Grandsire: Hail To Reason
- Dam: Outward Sunshine
- Damsire: Graustark
- Sex: Stallion
- Foaled: 1985
- Country: United States
- Colour: Dark Bay
- Breeder: John W. Galbreath
- Owner: Darby Dan Farm
- Trainer: John M. Veitch
- Record: 23: 8-6-2
- Earnings: $2,084,800

Major wins
- Hill Prince Stakes (1988); Lexington Stakes (1988); Turf Classic (1988); Washington, D.C. International Stakes (1988); Man o' War Stakes (1988)

Awards
- American Champion Male Turf Horse (1988)
- Last updated on March 7, 2014

Sunshine Forever (March 14, 1985 – January 7, 2014) was an American Champion Thoroughbred racehorse. Bred by Darby Dan Farm owner John W. Galbreath who owned his dam, Outward Sunshine, and his damsire, Graustark, Sunshine Forever was sired by Galbreath's 1972 Epsom Derby winner, Roberto.

Trained by future U.S. Racing Hall of Fame inductee, John M. Veitch, Sunshine Forever was voted the Eclipse Award for American Champion Male Turf Horse following a 1988 season in which he won three Grade I races. In addition to winning the important Turf Classic, Man o' War Stakes, and the Washington, D.C. International Stakes, the colt ran second to Great Communicator in the Breeders' Cup Turf and third to winner Mill Native in the Arlington Million.

In 1989, Sunshine Forever's best major race results were a second in the Grade II Canadian Turf Handicap at Gulfstream Park in Florida and a third-place finish in the Grade III Fort Marcy Handicap at Aqueduct Racetrack in New York City.

Retired to stud duty at Darby Dan Farm, Sunshine Forever's offspring met with modest racing success. After standing in the United States, he was sent to Nitta Farm in Japan. In late 2004, arrangements were made to bring the then nineteen-year-old horse to the Old Friends retirement home for thoroughbred racehorses in Georgetown, Kentucky. He died at Old Friends on January 7, 2014, aged 29.
