= Audax Minor =

Canadian writer (1887–1979)

George F. T. Ryall
- Born: 1887; Toronto, Ontario, Canada
- Died: October 8, 1979 (aged 91–92); Columbia, Maryland, United States
- Other names: Audax Minor
- Occupation: newspaper/magazine writer
- Employer(s): The New Yorker; New York World; London Exchange-Telegraph
- Notable work: "The Race Track" (1926-1978)
- Awards: Walter Haight Award (1972)
- Honors: NMRHF Joe Hirsch Media Roll of Honor (2013)

Audax Minor (1887 – October 8, 1979), the pen name of George F. T. Ryall, was a Canadian writer who worked as the horse racing columnist for The New Yorker for 52 years.

Born in Toronto, Ryall was sent to England to be educated in 1900. In England, he began working as a general reporter for the newspaper London Exchange-Telegraph and began writing racing reports from England for New York World.

Ryall afterwards went to New York City, and his first column for The New Yorker was published on July 10, 1926. The New Yorker had been launched on February 21, 1925. Ryall chose a pen name because at the time he was still writing for New York World; he used this name in honor of Audax, the nom de plume of British racing journalist Arthur Fitzhardinge Berkeley Portman. (Ryall's full name was George Francis Trafford Ryall. His son, a horse-racing photographer, and grandson, an art photographer, both received the same name, designated as generations II and III.)

His column, "The Race Track," ran in The New Yorker, where he wrote from 1926 to 1978, a 52-year record of seniority at the magazine that was later eclipsed by Roger Angell, who wrote for The New Yorker from 1944 until his death in 2022 at the age 101, and by John McPhee, who has written for the magazine for 60 years, beginning in 1963. Ryall wrote on various aspects of horse racing, from starting barriers to horse training, from the Saratoga Special Stakes to the names given horses. "Being one of those peevish fellows who believe that every horse deserves a good name (and you'll find that, on the whole, the better racers are well named)," Ryall wrote in 1960, "I'm sorry to say this year's crop of two-year-olds has fared pretty badly... Ambiopoise... Nassue... Rulamyth..."

He also wrote for PM, The Blood-Horse, Town & Country, The Sportsman, Polo, and Country Life. Ryall won the Walter Haight Award in 1972.

Ryall also wrote on automobiles, polo and men's fashions.

He died at Columbia, Maryland. His obituary in Time magazine described him as a "jaunty, tweedy Canadian."

In 2013, Ryall was posthumously selected to the National Museum of Racing and Hall of Fame's Joe Hirsch Media Roll of Honor.
