= Agar, South Dakota =

- Town
- Location in Sully County and the state of South Dakota
- Coordinates: 44°50′23″N 100°04′24″W
- Country: United States
- State: South Dakota
- County: Sully
- Settled: 1910
- Incorporated: 1926

Area
  - Total: 0.20 sq mi (0.53 km^{2})
  - Land: 0.20 sq mi (0.53 km^{2})
  - Water: 0 sq mi (0.00 km^{2})
- Elevation: 1,854 ft (565 m)

Population (2020)
  - Total: 68
  - Density: 331.6/sq mi (128.03/km^{2})
- Time zone: UTC-6 (Central (CST))
  - Summer (DST): UTC-5 (CDT)
- ZIP code: 57520
- Area code: 605
- FIPS code: 46-00460
- GNIS feature ID: 1267259

Agar (/ˈeɪɡɑːr/; AY-gar) is a small town in Sully County, South Dakota, United States. As of the 2020 census, Agar had a population of 68. Agar is a farm/ranch service center.

== History ==
Agar was laid out in 1910, and named in honor of Charles H. Agar, a county official. It was also called Milford.

== Geography ==
According to the United States Census Bureau, the town has a total area of 0.16 square miles (0.41 km^{2}), all land.

== Demographics ==
Historical population
| Census | Pop. | Note | %± |
|---|---|---|---|
| 1930 | 200 | | — |
| 1940 | 142 | | −29.0% |
| 1950 | 141 | | −0.7% |
| 1960 | 139 | | −1.4% |
| 1970 | 156 | | 12.2% |
| 1980 | 139 | | −10.9% |
| 1990 | 82 | | −41.0% |
| 2000 | 82 | | 0.0% |
| 2010 | 76 | | −7.3% |
| 2020 | 68 | | −10.5% |
U.S. Decennial Census

=== 2010 census ===
As of the census of 2010, there were 76 people, 44 households, and 22 families residing in the town. The population density was 475.0 inhabitants per square mile (183.4/km^{2}). There were 48 housing units at an average density of 300.0 per square mile (115.8/km^{2}). The racial makeup of the town was 98.7% White and 1.3% from two or more races. Hispanic or Latino of any race were 1.3% of the population.

There were 44 households, of which 18.2% had children under the age of 18 living with them, 31.8% were married couples living together, 13.6% had a female householder with no husband present, 4.5% had a male householder with no wife present, and 50.0% were non-families. 47.7% of all households were made up of individuals, and 22.7% had someone living alone who was 65 years of age or older. The average household size was 1.73 and the average family size was 2.36.

The median age in the town was 53 years. 11.8% of residents were under the age of 18; 7.9% were between the ages of 18 and 24; 11.8% were from 25 to 44; 38.2% were from 45 to 64; and 30.3% were 65 years of age or older. The gender makeup of the town was 44.7% male and 55.3% female.

=== 2000 census ===
As of the census of 2000, there were 82 people, 41 households, and 22 families residing in the town. The population density was 487.8 inhabitants per square mile (188.3/km^{2}). There were 54 housing units at an average density of 321.2 per square mile (124.0/km^{2}). The racial makeup of the town was 98.78% White and 1.22% Native American. Hispanic or Latino of any race were 2.44% of the population.

There were 41 households, out of which 19.5% had children under the age of 18 living with them, 43.9% were married couples living together, 7.3% had a female householder with no husband present, and 46.3% were non-families. 39.0% of all households were made up of individuals, and 19.5% had someone living alone who was 65 years of age or older. The average household size was 2.00 and the average family size was 2.64.

In the town, the population was spread out, with 14.6% under the age of 18, 8.5% from 18 to 24, 19.5% from 25 to 44, 32.9% from 45 to 64, and 24.4% who were 65 years of age or older. The median age was 49 years. For every 100 females, there were 105.0 males. For every 100 females age 18 and over, there were 105.9 males.

The median income for a household in the town was $28,125, and the median income for a family was $38,750. Males had a median income of $31,250 versus $12,083 for females. The per capita income for the town was $21,812. There were no families and 7.1% of the population living below the poverty line, including no under eighteens and 6.9% of those over 64.

== Notable people ==
- Cash Asmussen, Thoroughbred horse racing jockey
- Patrick J. Kane, member of the South Dakota House of Representatives
