= Past performance =

In general, "past performance" refers to how something has performed in the past, for example how an athlete, a business, an investment portfolio, an individual stock, a sports team or a race horse has performed. The term "past performance" is used more specifically in relation to government procurement, horse racing and mutual fund disclosure documents.

== Government Procurement ==
=== United Kingdom ===
Crown Commercial Service's Procurement Policy Note 04/15, applicable to central government departments, executive agencies and non-departmental public bodies, sets out UK government policy effective from 1 April 2015 regarding use of suppliers' past performance information when awarding public contracts.

=== United States ===
Past performance is a central element of the process used by U.S. government agencies when they evaluate companies and proposals to determine which ones will be awarded contracts. Knowledge and awareness of how past performance is evaluated are critical to successful proposals to perform government work.

Although past performance is a natural consideration and has been used as an implied evaluation factor, its use was not formalized by the U.S. government until the 1960s through a Department of Defense past performance reporting system known as the Contractor Performance Report.

Defining past performance as an evaluation factor distinguishes it from past performance information, or relevant information about a contractor’s actions under previously awarded contracts. In practice in the U.S. government contracting market, the term “past performance” includes three elements; 1) what work a contractor performed, 2) judgments about the breadth, depth and relevance of that experience and 3) judgments about how well the contractor performed.

The Contractor Performance Assessment Reporting System (CPARS), accessible through the Past Performance Information Retrieval System (PPIRS) until the two systems were merged on 15 January 2019, is the U.S. government enterprise solution for collection and retention of contractor past performance information. The main activity associated with this system is the documentation of contractor and grantee performance information that is required by federal regulations (see Federal Acquisition Regulations part 42.15). This is accomplished in web-enabled reports referred to as CPARS reports or report cards. These reports are available to U.S. government agencies making contract award decisions.

== Horse Racing ==
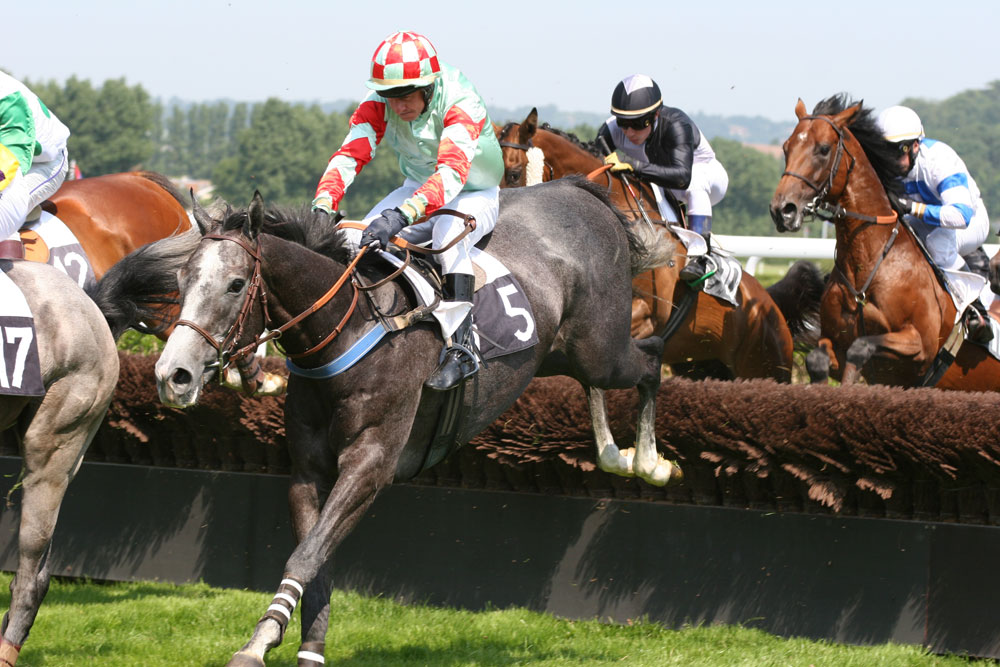
Steeplechase racing at Deauville

Past Performances appear on horse racing programs such as the DRF (Daily Racing Form), Equibase, and Brisnet. Information on jockeys, trainers, date of races, finishes in races, speed figures, odds and more of the last 10 races are provided to give handicappers a sense of history and information to bet with. Horse racing handicappers study the past performance of each horse in a race, examining among other things the combination of speed, endurance and grit demonstrated by the animal in prior meets.

== Mutual Fund Disclosures ==
The phrase “past performance is not an indicator of future performance” (or similar) can be found in the fine print of most mutual fund literature. Nonetheless, past performance of an investment fund or portfolio, and the management thereof, is frequently considered when judging the fund or the management of it. Demonstrating the ability to outperform peers or index funds repeatedly is seen as a way to evaluate a fund manager’s skill.

The S&P Persistence Scorecard is published twice a year to answer the question of whether past performance in investment funds matters. This report tracks the consistency of top performers over yearly consecutive periods and measures performance persistence through transition matrices. The University of Chicago’s Center for Research in Security Prices (CRSP) Survivorship Bias Free Mutual Fund Database serves as the underlying data source for these reports.
