= Ted Bassett (businessman) =

American police chief (1921–2025)

- Born: October 26, 1921
- Died: January 23, 2025

James Edward Bassett III (October 26, 1921 – January 23, 2025) was an American executive in law enforcement and horse racing.

== Background ==
Bassett graduated from Kent School in 1941 and Yale College. He served as an infantry officer in 4th Marine Regiment of the 6th Marine Division in World War II and received a Presidential Unit Citation and two Purple Hearts for wounds sustained in combat during the Battle of Okinawa.

Bassett turned 100 in 2021, and died on January 23, 2025, at the age of 103.

== Career ==
Bassett was the Director of the Kentucky State Police and initiated the foundation of the College of Justice and Safety at Eastern Kentucky University in August 1965. He worked at Keeneland for over 40 years, and held senior positions, including president and chairman of the board. He received the Eclipse Award of Merit in 1995. He was inducted in the National Museum of Racing and Hall of Fame in 2019.
