= Daily Racing Form Horse Racing =

- Developer: Radish Works
- Publisher: Head Games Publishing
- Platform: Windows
- Release: November 1999
- Genre: Horse Racing

Daily Racing Form Horse Racing is a 1999 video game developed by Radish Works and published by Head Games Publishing. It was released in November 1999.

== Gameplay ==
The player manages a horse stable by buying, naming, breeding, feeding, training, and racing horses, earning money through race winnings and breeding fees to expand the stable. The player can either race as a jockey, hire one to compete against computer-controlled opponents, or place bets on races using win, place, show, exacta, and quinella wagers. Online play allows the player to enter horses in races against other players, join or host races with friends, or bet on other players' horses. Before races, the player can review entrants, play horse trivia, chat online, and make wagers, then watch the race and cheer on a chosen horse. The game features four racetracks, over 100 horses that can be bought, sold, and bred, and multiple entry-fee and purse levels.

== Development ==
Daily Racing Form Horse Racing was developed by Radish Works, a company founded by employees who worked at Visio Corporation, Boomerang Technology and Softdesk.

== Reception ==
Reception

Review scores
Publication	Score
Computer Games Magazine	1.5/5
IGN	4/10

Computer Games Magazine called Horse Racing a bad game even with the $20 price point. IGN dislked the presentation and gameplay in Horse Racing.
