= Baltimore Washington International Turf Cup =

Turf horse race in the United States

- Class: Grade III
- Location: Pimlico Race Course, Baltimore, Maryland, United States
- Inaugurated: 1952
- Race type: Thoroughbred – flat racing
- Website: Laurel Park Racecourse

Race information
- Distance: 1 mile (8 furlongs)
- Surface: Turf
- Track: Left-handed
- Qualification: 3-year-olds and up
- Purse: $200,000 (2021)

The Baltimore Washington International Turf Cup is an American Grade III invitational horse race run over one mile. Inaugurated in 1952 as the Washington, D.C. International Stakes, it was raced at Laurel Park Racecourse on the turf in Laurel, Maryland, at a distance of 1 1/2 miles (12 furlongs), and attracted top turf horses from North America and Europe.

It was held annually from 1952 to 1994, then it was discontinued because of its place on the late fall calendar and the popularity of the Breeders' Cup Turf. The race was brought back in 2005 as the Colonial Turf Cup run at Colonial Downs in Richmond, Virginia, and then at Laurel Park Racecourse as the Commonwealth Turf Cup in Laurel, Maryland, from 2015 to 2016. Then in 2017 the original root of race name was brought back as well adding it to a portion of its last version the Turf Cup suffix. So it is now being called the Baltimore Washington International Turf Cup. The race has been contested at Pimlico Race Course since 2021.

When it was founded by John D. Schapiro (owner of the Laurel Park Racecourse), it was the only international horse race in the United States. Until then, bringing horses from Europe and elsewhere to the United States for a specific race was unprecedented. J. Samuel Pearlman, editor of the Daily Racing Form, discussed the idea with Schapiro after the 1950 racing season. Less than a year and half later, the concept became a reality.

Usually just called the International, the race drew the best Thoroughbreds from the U.S. and Europe; it was important enough to attract horses from the Soviet Union during the 1960s, despite the Cold War. In the 1980s, the Washington, D.C. International was part of a million-dollar bonus given to any horse who won both it, the Canadian International Stakes at Woodbine Racetrack in Toronto, and the Turf Classic at Belmont Park in New York.

In the race's early days, few American horses excelled on the turf; some were turf specialists, while others built their race records on the dirt and then specifically switched over to grass for the International. U.S. Hall of Famer Kelso won five straight Horse of the Year honors competing almost entirely on the dirt in the early 1960s and finished second three times in a row in the International. In 1964, the great gelding finally won the race in an American record time of 2:23.80. He had given the event international status in Europe by just missing three times, before winning it at age seven.

The Washington, D.C. International Stakes was raced at a distance of 1 1/2 miles from its inception in 1952 until 1986, when it was shortened to 1 1/4 miles. With the exception of 1993 (when it was raced at one mile), the International remained at 1 1/4 miles until its final running in 1994.

Run the Gantlet won the International in 1971; his son Providential won it in 1981. Providential was bred and previously owned by Bertram R. Firestone, whose wife Diana won the race the following year with her filly April Run after coming in second to Providential in 1981.

During its run, the D.C. International Stakes was won by horses from the United States 22 times and by foreign representatives 21 times.

== Records ==
Speed record:

- 2:23.80 @ 1-1/2 miles: Kelso (1964) (stakes and track record)
- 1:59.60 @ 1-1/4 miles: Paradise Creek (1994)
- 1:52.98 @ 1-3/16 miles: Showing Up (2005)
- 1:33.35 @ 1 mile: Caribou Club (2019)

Most wins by a horse:

- 2 – Bald Eagle (1959, 1960)
- 2 – Fort Marcy (1967, 1970)

Most wins by an owner:

- 3 – Nelson Bunker Hunt (1973, 1975, 1976)

Most wins by a jockey:

- 3 – Manuel Ycaza (1959, 1960, 1967)
- 3 – Lester Piggott (1968, 1969, 1980)

Most wins by a trainer:

- 4 – Maurice Zilber (1973, 1975, 1976, 1980)

== Winners of the Baltimore Washington International Turf Cup since 1952 ==
Year	Winner	Nation	Age	Jockey	Trainer	Owner	Distance (miles)	Time	Grade
2023	Highestdistinction	(United States)	6	Jairo Rendon	Lindsay Schultz	Willow Lane Stables	1 m	1:36.63	III
2022	Set Piece	(United Kingdom)	6	Sheldon Russell	Brad H. Cox	Juddmonte Farms	1 m	1:35.70	III
2021	Field Pass	(United States)	4	Victor Carrasco	Michael Maker	Three Diamonds Farm	1 m	1:35.12	III
2020	no race								
2019	Caribou Club	(United States)	5	Feargal Lynch	Thomas F. Proctor	Glen Hill Farm (Craig Bernick)	1 m	1:33.35	III
2018	Doctor Mounty	(United States)	5	Forest Boyce	C. R. McGaughey III	Dave Alden	1 m	1:41.78	III
2017	Projected	(United Kingdom)	5	Nik Juarez	Chad C. Brown	Juddmonte Farms	1 m	1:34.25	II
2016	Blacktype	(France)	5	Trevor McCarthy	Christophe Clement	Jump Sucker Stable LLC (Duncker, Warsh, Walker)	1 m	1:33.43	II
2015	Mr. Speaker	(United States)	3	José Ortiz	C. R. McGaughey III	Phipps Stable	1 1/8	1:47.30	II
2014	no race								
2013	London Lane	(United Kingdom)	6	Horacio Karamanos	Lawrence Murray	Howard M. Bender	1 3/16	1:55.40	II
2012	Turbo Compressor	(United States)	4	Joe Bravo	Todd A. Pletcher	P & G Stable & Off The Hook Racing	1 3/16	1:55.00	II
2011	Rahystrada	(United States)	7	Sheldon Russell	Byron Hughes	Robert Courtney	1 3/16	1:54.68	II
2010	Paddy O'Prado	(United States)	3	Kent Desormeaux	Dale Romans	Donegal Racing	1 3/16	1:54.20	II
2009	Battle of Hastings	(United Kingdom)	3	Tyler Baze	Jeff Mullins	Michael House	1 3/16	1:57.79	II
2008	Sailor's Cap	(United States)	3	Alan Garcia	James J. Toner	Team Valor	1 3/16	2:04.42	III
2007	Summer Doldrums	(United States)	3	Jose Lezcano	Richard Violette Jr.	Klaravich Stables	1 3/16	1:55.68	III
2006	Showing Up	(United States)	3	Cornelio Velásquez	Barclay Tagg	Lael Stables (Gretchen & Roy Jackson)	1 3/16	1:52.98	
2005	English Channel	(United Kingdom)	3	John Velazquez	Todd Pletcher	James T. Scatuorchio	1 3/16	1:56:37	
1995–2004	no race								
1994	Paradise Creek	(United States)	5	Pat Day	William I. Mott	Masayki Nishiyama	1 1/4	1:59.60	I
1993	Buckhar	(United States)	5	Jean Cruguet	Willard C. Freeman	John W. Meriwether	1 m	1:38.00	I
1992	Zoman	(United Kingdom)	5	Alan Munro	Paul Cole	Prince Fahd Salman	1 1/4	2:01.40	I
1991	Leariva	(France)	4	Edgar Prado	David Smaga	Thierry van Zuylen	1 1/4	2:06.40	I
1990	Fly Till Dawn	(United States)	4	Laffit Pincay Jr.	Darrell Vienna	Josephine T. Gleis	1 1/4	2:01.20	I
1989	Caltech	(United States)	3	René Douglas	Eduardo Azpurua Sr.	David S. Romanik	1 1/4	2:07.60	I
1988	Sunshine Forever	(United States)	3	Ángel Cordero Jr.	John M. Veitch	Darby Dan Farm	1 1/4	2:03.00	I
1987	Le Glorieux	(France)	3	Laffit Pincay Jr.	Robert Collet	Sieglinde Wolf	1 1/4	2:02.80	I
1986	Lieutenant's Lark	(United States)	4	Robbie Davis	Howard M. Tesher	Lowell T. Stevens	1 1/4	2:09.00	I
1985	Vanlandingham	(United States)	4	Don MacBeth	C. R. McGaughey III	Loblolly Stable	1 1/2	2:35.60	I
1984	Seattle Song	(France)	3	Cash Asmussen	François Boutin	Stavros Niarchos	1 1/2	2:27.20	I
1983	All Along	(France)	4	Walter Swinburn	Patrick Biancone	Daniel Wildenstein	1 1/2	2:35.00	I
1982	April Run	(France)	4	Cash Asmussen	François Boutin	Diana M. Firestone	1 1/2	2:31.00	I
1981	Providential	(United States)	4	Alain Lequeux	Charles Whittingham	Serge Fradkoff	1 1/2	2:31.20	I
1980	Argument	(France)	3	Lester Piggott	Maurice Zilber	Bruce McNall	1 1/2	2:30.20	I
1979	Bowl Game	(United States)	5	Jorge Velásquez	John M. Gaver Jr.	Greentree Stable	1 1/2	2:51.00	I
1978	Mac Diarmida	(United States)	3	Jean Cruguet	Scotty Schulhofer	Jerome M. Torsney	1 1/2	2:27.00	I
1977	Johnny D.	(United States)	3	Steve Cauthen	Michael Kay	Dana S. Bray Jr.	1 1/2	2:32.00	I
1976	Youth	(France)	3	Sandy Hawley	Maurice Zilber	Nelson Bunker Hunt	1 1/2	2:46.20	I
1975	Nobiliary	(France)	3	Sandy Hawley	Maurice Zilber	Nelson Bunker Hunt	1 1/2	2:31.20	I
1974	Admetus	(France)	4	Maurice Philipperon	John Cunnington Jr.	Sir Michael Sobell	1 1/2	2:29.60	I
1973	Dahlia	(France)	3	Bill Pyers	Maurice Zilber	Nelson Bunker Hunt	1 1/2	2:31.80	I
1972	Droll Role	(United States)	4	Braulio Baeza	Thomas J. Kelly	John M. Schiff	1 1/2	2:38.80	I
1971	Run the Gantlet	(United States)	3	Robert Woodhouse	J. Elliott Burch	Rokeby Stables	1 1/2	2:50.60	
1970	Fort Marcy	(United States)	6	Jorge Velásquez	J. Elliott Burch	Rokeby Stables	1 1/2	2:42.80	
1969	Karabas	(United Kingdom)	4	Lester Piggott	Bernard van Cutsem	Benjamin Guinness	1 1/2	2:27.00	
1968	Sir Ivor	(Republic of Ireland)	3	Lester Piggott	Vincent O'Brien	Raymond R. Guest	1 1/2	2:37.20	
1967	Fort Marcy	(United States)	3	Manuel Ycaza	J. Elliott Burch	Rokeby Stables	1 1/2	2:27.00	
1966	Behistoun	(France)	3	Jean Deforge	Joseph Lieux	Alec Weisweiller	1 1/2	2:28.80	
1965	Diatome	(France)	3	Jean Deforge	Geoffroy Watson	Guy de Rothschild	1 1/2	2:28.20	
1964	Kelso	(United States)	7	Ismael Valenzuela	Carl Hanford	Bohemia Stable	1 1/2	2:23.80	
1963	Mongo	(United States)	4	Wayne Chambers	Frank A. Bonsal	Marion duPont Scott	1 1/2	2:27.40	
1962	Match II	(France)	4	Yves Saint-Martin	François Mathet	Haras d'Ouilly	1 1/2	2:28.20	
1961	T.V. Lark	(United States)	4	Johnny Longden	Paul K. Parker	Preston W. Madden	1 1/2	2:26.20	
1960	Bald Eagle	(United States)	5	Manuel Ycaza	Woody Stephens	Cain Hoy Stable	1 1/2	2:33.00	
1959	Bald Eagle	(United States)	4	Manuel Ycaza	Woody Stephens	Cain Hoy Stable	1 1/2	2:28.00	
1958	Sailor's Guide*	(Australia)	6	Howard Grant	J. Bowes Bond	Jaclyn Stable	1 1/2	2:33.20	
1957	Mahan	(United States)	6	Sam Boulmetis Sr.	Harry Trotsek	Hasty House Farm (Allie E. Reuben)	1 1/2	2:34.60	
1956	Master Boing	(France)	3	Guy Chancelier	Georges Pelat	Andre E. Lombard	1 1/2	2:39.00	
1955	El Chama	(Venezuela)	4	Raul Bustamante	Jose Israel La Belle	Carlos V. Rincones	1 1/2	2:36.20	
1954	Fisherman	(United States)	3	Eddie Arcaro	Sylvester Veitch	C. V. Whitney	1 1/2	2:47.80	
1953	Worden	(France)	4	Charles Smirke	Georges Bridgland	Ralph Strassburger	1 1/2	2:36.00	
1952	Wilwyn	(United Kingdom)	4	Manny Mercer	John Waugh	Robert C. Boucher	1 1/2	2:30.80	

* In 1958, Tudor Era finished first, but was disqualified and set back to second.
