= Patrick J. Kane =

American politician

Member of the South Dakota House of Representatives
- In office 1985–1992

Personal details
- Born: August 22, 1927 Agar, South Dakota, U.S.
- Died: July 14, 2021 (aged 93)
- Party: Democratic
- Education: South Dakota State University; University of South Dakota

Patrick J. Kane (August 22, 1927 – July 14, 2021) was an American politician. He served as a Democratic member of the South Dakota House of Representatives.

== Life and career ==
Kane was born in Agar, South Dakota. He attended South Dakota State University and the University of South Dakota.

Kane was a lawyer.

Kane served in the South Dakota House of Representatives from 1985 to 1992.

Kane died on July 14, 2021, at the age of 93.
