= Joe Hirsch Turf Classic Stakes =

- Class: Grade I
- Location: Belmont Park; Elmont, New York, United States
- Inaugurated: 1977 (as Turf Classic at Aqueduct Racetrack)
- Race type: Thoroughbred – Flat racing
- Website: NYRA

Race information
- Distance: 1 1/2 miles
- Surface: Turf
- Track: Left-handed
- Qualification: Three-years-old and older
- Weight: Weight for Age
- Purse: $500,000 (2021)

The Joe Hirsch Turf Classic Stakes is a Grade I American Weight for Age Thoroughbred horse race for three years old and older over a distance of 1 1/2 miles on the turf track scheduled in late September or early October at Belmont Park. The event currently offers a purse of $500,000.

== History ==
The inaugural running of the event was on 19 November 1977 as the Aqueduct Turf Classic Stakes and was won by Johnny D., ridden by 17-year-old Steve Cauthen by 3 3/4 lengths in a time of 2:33 1/5. The event was scheduled two weeks after the Washington D.C. International, an event that Johnny D. won as well earning him US Champion Male Turf Horse honors for 1977. The following year the event was held at Belmont Park. In 1979, the event was classified as Grade I and was returned to the Aqueduct and was held there until 1983.

In 1983 the name of the event was shortened to being called just the Turf Classic. The event drew the top Thoroughbreds from the U.S. and Europe when it was part of a million-dollar bonus for any horse who won it plus the Canadian International Stakes at Woodbine Racetrack in Toronto and the Washington D.C. International at Laurel Park Racecourse in Laurel, Maryland. That year the champion French bred filly All Along was able to win the treble, winning the million-dollar bonus and being crowned US Champion Female Turf Horse and US Horse of the Year.

Other notable champions to win the event in the pre-Breeders' Cup era include the French bred mare, winner in 1978, Waya, who was crowned the US Champion Older Female Horse the following year. The Irish bred filly April Run won the event twice in 1981 and 1982. In 1982 she also won the Washington D.C. International and was voted as US Champion Female Turf Horse. John Henry remarkably won this event in 1984 as a nine-year-old and what would be his second last start. He was crowned the US Horse of the Year that year.

Early in the Breeders' Cup era the event immediately become one of the major preparatory races for the Breeders' Cup Turf. The 1986 winner, the three-year-old Manila, and the 1987 winner, the Irish bred Theatrical, both won the Breeders' Cup Turf and were voted US Champion Male Turf Horse. In 1994 Tikkanen also won the Turf Classic-Breeders' Cup Turf double enroute to US Champion Male Turf Horse.

In 2004 the event was renamed in honor of Joe Hirsch, the award-winning racing columnist and founding president of the National Turf Writers Association. Joe Hirsch, aged 80, died on January 9, 2009.

Dual winner English Channel was a Breeders' Cup Turf winner in 2007 and also the sire of Channel Maker, a dual winner (2018, 2020) and second-placed finisher in 2019 of this event.

In 2022 the event was moved to Aqueduct Racetrack due to infield tunnel and redevelopment work at Belmont Park. The 2022 & 2023 winner was English Channel's daughter War Like Goddess, with his offspring successful in the event for the fourth time.

== Records ==
Time record:

- 2:23.39 – Big Blue Kitten (2015)

Margins:

- 10 1/4 lengths – Grand Couturier (GB) (2008)

Most wins:

- 2 – April Run (IRE) (1981, 1982)
- 2 – Val's Prince (1997, 1999)
- 2 – English Channel (2006, 2007)
- 2 – Channel Maker (2018, 2020)
- 2 – War Like Goddess (2022, 2023)

Most wins by an owner:

- 4 – Bertram & Diana M. Firestone (1981, 1982, 1987, 2010)

Most wins by a jockey:

- 5 – John R. Velazquez (1995, 2004, 2006, 2007, 2012)

Most wins by a trainer:

- 6 – William I. Mott (1987, 2005, 2018, 2020, 2022, 2023)

== Winners ==
Year	Winner	Age	Jockey	Trainer	Owner	Distance	Time	Purse	Grade	Ref
At Aqueduct – Joe Hirsch Turf Classic Stakes
2026	Minaret Station	4	Jose L. Ortiz	William Walden	OXO Equine	1 1/2 miles	2:28.18	$500,000	I	
2025	Rebel's Romance (IRE)	7	Frankie Dettori	Charlie Appleby	Godolphin	1 1/2 miles	2:25.72	$485,000	I	
2024	Far Bridge	4	Joel Rosario	Christophe Clement	LSU Stables	1 1/2 miles	2:32.22	$485,000	I	
2023	ƒ War Like Goddess	6	Junior Alvarado	William I. Mott	George Krikorian	1 1/2 miles	2:32.86 (Note: War Like Goddess set a new track record for the distance on the outer turf track at Aqueduct)	$500,000	I	
2022	ƒ War Like Goddess	5	Jose Lezcano	William I. Mott	George Krikorian	1 1/2 miles	2:27.29	$500,000	I	
At Belmont Park
2021	Rockemperor (IRE)	5	Javier Castellano	Chad C. Brown	Michael Dubb, Michael E. Kisber, Wonder Stables, Bethlehem Stables & Madaket Stables	1 1/2 miles	2:25.61	$500,000	I	
2020	Channel Maker	6	Manuel Franco	William I. Mott	Wachtel Stable, Gary Barber, R. A. Hill Stable & Reeves Thoroughbred Racing	1 1/2 miles	2:25.99	$250,000	I	
2019	Arklow	5	Junior Alvarado	Brad H. Cox	Donegal Racing, Joseph Bulger & Peter Coneway	1 1/2 miles	2:27.34	$507,500	I	
2018	Channel Maker	4	Jose L. Ortiz	William I. Mott	Wachtel Stable & Gary Barber	1 1/2 miles	2:30.73	$500,000	I	
2017	Beach Patrol	4	Joel Rosario	Chad C. Brown	James Covello, Sheep Pond Partners & Head of Plains Partners	1 1/2 miles	2:26.29	$500,000	I	
2016	Ectot (GB)	5	Jose L. Ortiz	Todd A. Pletcher	Al Shaqab Racing & Gerard Augustin-Normand	1 1/2 miles	2:28.76	$475,000	I	
2015	Big Blue Kitten	7	Joe Bravo	Chad C. Brown	Kenneth and Sarah Ramsey	1 1/2 miles	2:23.39	$600,000	I	
2014	Main Sequence	5	Rajiv Maragh	H. Graham Motion	Flaxman Holdings	1 1/2 miles	2:26.32	$600,000	I	
Joe Hirsch Turf Classic Invitational Stakes
2013	Little Mike	6	Mike E. Smith	Dale L. Romans	Priscilla Vaccarezza	1 1/2 miles	2:25.00	$600,000	I	
2012	Point of Entry	4	John R. Velazquez	Claude R. McGaughey III	Phipps Stable	1 1/2 miles	2:33.73	$600,000	I	
2011	Cape Blanco (IRE)	4	Jamie P. Spencer	Aidan P. O'Brien	Derrick Smith, Mrs. John Magnier, Michael Tabor & Mrs. Fitriani Hay	1 1/2 miles	2:36.61	$500,000	I	
2010	Winchester	5	Cornelio Velasquez	Christophe Clement	Bertram and Diana Firestone	1 1/2 miles	2:36.09	$500,000	I	
2009	Interpatation	7	Robby Albarado	Robert Barbara	Elliot Mavorah	1 1/2 miles	2:41.22	$600,000	I	
2008	Grand Couturier (GB)	5	Alan Garcia	Robert Ribaudo	Marc Keller	1 1/2 miles	2:34.84	$600,000	I	
2007	English Channel	5	John R. Velazquez	Todd A. Pletcher	James T. Scatuorchio	1 1/2 miles	2:25.73	$600,000	I	
2006	§ English Channel	4	John R. Velazquez	Todd A. Pletcher	James T. Scatuorchio	1 1/2 miles	2:28.69	$600,000	I	
2005	Shakespeare	4	Jerry D. Bailey	William I. Mott	Dell Ridge Farm & William Schettine	1 1/2 miles	2:27.22	$750,000	I	
2004	Kitten's Joy	3	John R. Velazquez	Dale L. Romans	Kenneth and Sarah Ramsey	1 1/2 miles	2:29.97	$750,000	I	
Turf Classic Invitational Stakes
2003	Sulamani (IRE)	4	Jerry D. Bailey	Saeed bin Suroor	Godolphin Racing	1 1/2 miles	2:27.51	$750,000	I	
2002	§ Denon	4	Edgar S. Prado	Robert J. Frankel	Edmund A. Gann & Flaxman Stable	1 1/2 miles	2:28.47	$750,000	I	
2001	Timboroa (GB)	5	Edgar S. Prado	Robert J. Frankel	Edmund A. Gann	1 1/2 miles	2:29.43	$750,000	I	
2000	John's Call	9	Jean-Luc Samyn	Thomas H. Voss	Trillium Stable	1 1/2 miles	2:28.58	$750,000	I	
1999	Val's Prince	7	Jorge F. Chavez	H. James Bond	Robin Martin & Steve Weiner	1 1/2 miles	2:28.63	$600,000	I	
1998	Buck's Boy	5	Shane Sellers	P. Noel Hickey	Quarter B Farm	1 1/2 miles	2:33.25	$500,000	I	
1997	Val's Prince	5	Mike E. Smith	James E. Picou	Robin Martin & Steve Weiner	1 1/2 miles	2:28.92	$500,000	I	
1996	Diplomatic Jet	4	Jorge F. Chavez	James E. Picou	Fred W. Hooper	1 1/2 miles	2:27.51	$500,000	I	
1995	Turk Passer	5	John R. Velazquez	Flint S. Schulhofer	Michael Shanley	1 1/2 miles	2:36.63	$500,000	I	
1994	Tikkanen	3	Cash Asmussen	Jonathan E. Pease	Augustin Stable	1 1/2 miles	2:25.88	$500,000	I	
1993	Apple Tree (FR)	4	Mike E. Smith	André Fabre	Mohammed Al Kabeer	1 1/2 miles	2:28.31	$500,000	I	
1992	Sky Classic	5	Pat Day	James E. Day	Sam-Son Farm	1 1/2 miles	2:24.50	$500,000	I	
1991	Solar Splendor	4	Herb McCauley	Patrick J. Kelly	Live Oak Plantation	1 1/2 miles	2:27.89	$500,000	I	
At Belmont Park – Turf Classic
1990	Cacoethes	4	Ray Cochrane	Guy Harwood	Lady Jane Harrison	1 1/2 miles	2:25.00	$600,000	I	
1989	Yankee Affair	7	Jose A. Santos	Henry L. Carroll	Jujugen Stable	1 1/2 miles	2:27.20	$654,200	I	
1988	Sunshine Forever	3	Angel Cordero Jr.	John M. Veitch	Darby Dan Farm	1 1/2 miles	2:33.80	$600,000	I	
1987	Theatrical (IRE)	5	Pat Day	William I. Mott	Bertram R. Firestone	1 1/2 miles	2:29.20	$600,000	I	
1986	Manila	3	Jose A. Santos	LeRoy Jolley	Bradley M. Shannon	1 1/2 miles	2:27.80	$705,250	I	
1985	Noble Fighter	3	Alain Lequeux	Mitri Saliba	Buckram Oak Farm	1 1/2 miles	2:25.40	$718,500	I	
1984	John Henry	9	Chris McCarron	Ron McAnally	Dotsam Stable	1 1/2 miles	2:25.20	$626,250	I	
At Aqueduct
1983	ƒ All Along (FR)	4	Walter R. Swinburn	Patrick L. Biancone	Daniel Wildenstein	1 1/2 miles	2:34.00	$585,700	I	
1982	ƒ April Run (IRE)	4	Cash Asmussen	François Boutin	Diana M. Firestone	1 1/2 miles	2:29.80	$476,800	I	
1981	ƒ April Run (IRE)	3	Philippe Paquet	François Boutin	Diana M. Firestone	1 1/2 miles	2:31.20	$300,000	I	
1980	ƒ Anifa	4	Alfred Gibert	Mitri Saliba	Buckram Oak Farm	1 1/2 miles	2:39.60	$300,000	I	
1979	Bowl Game	5	Jorge Velasquez	John M. Gaver Jr.	Greentree Stable	1 1/2 miles	2:28.20	$250,000	I	
At Belmont
1978	ƒ Waya (FR)	4	Angel Cordero Jr.	Angel Penna Sr.	Daniel Wildenstein	1 1/2 miles	2:26.80	$200,000		
At Aqueduct
1977	Johnny D.	3	Steve Cauthen	Michael Kay	Dana S. Bray Jr.	1 1/2 miles	2:33.20	$200,000		

Legend:
Turf
Notes:
§ Ran as an entry
ƒ Filly or Mare

== See also ==
- List of American and Canadian Graded races
- Joe Hirsch Turf Classic Invitational Handicap top three finishers and starters
