= Dream Well (horse) =

French-bred Thoroughbred racehorse

- Sire: Sadler's Wells
- Grandsire: Northern Dancer
- Dam: Soul Dream
- Damsire: Alleged
- Sex: Stallion
- Foaled: 1995
- Country: France
- Colour: Bay
- Breeder: Flaxman Holdings Ltd.
- Owner: Niarchos family
- Trainer: Pascal Bary
- Record: 14: 4-4-4
- Earnings: €1,327,644

Major wins
- Prix La Force (1998); Prix du Jockey Club (1998); Irish Derby Stakes (1998); Prix Gontaut-Biron (1999)

Awards
- European Champion 3-Yr-Old Colt (1998); European Horse of the Year (1998)
- Last updated on June 22, 2007

Dream Well (31 January 1995 – 13 October 2022) was a champion Thoroughbred racehorse, bred in France by the Niarchos family. Dream Well was purchased at the Agence Francaise Yearling Sale in Deauville by Jean Louis Bouchard. He became best known for winning not only the Prix du Jockey Club (French Derby), but also the Irish Derby Stakes in 1998 – a classic double which until that year was only completed by Assert and Old Vic in the 1980s.

== Background ==
Dream Well's dam was Soul Dream, herself the daughter of the dual Prix de l'Arc de Triomphe winner Alleged. Sired by Champion Sadler's Wells, himself the winner of Irish 2,000 Guineas and the Eclipse Stakes. Dream Well's ancestors through his great grand dam Mia Pola can be traced back to U.S. Triple Crown champion War Admiral, and also his pedigree carries a double cross of world-renowned sire Northern Dancer, through his dam and sire.

== Racing career ==
As a three-year-old, trained by Pascal Bary and ridden by Cash Asmussen, Dream Well won the Prix du Jockey Club (French Derby) on only his fourth ever outing, beating Croco Rouge by ½ length. One month later in magnificent style, quickly leaving his rivals for dead, Dream Well completed the double by winning the Irish Derby and so beating City Honours by 4½ lengths. This led to Dream Well being voted the 1998 Irish Horse of the Year and 1998 European Horse of the Year.

== Stud record ==
Dream Well was retired from racing at the end of the 1999 season and was sent to stud in Japan and, for one season, New Zealand. He returned to France in 2004 to stand at Haras de Fresnay-le-Buffard.

Dream Well died on 13 October 2022.

== Pedigree ==
Pedigree of Dream Well
Sire Sadler's Wells	Northern Dancer	Nearctic	Nearco
Sire Sadler's Wells	Northern Dancer	Nearctic	Lady Angela
Sire Sadler's Wells	Northern Dancer	Natalma	Native Dancer
Sire Sadler's Wells	Northern Dancer	Natalma	Almahmoud
Sire Sadler's Wells	Fairy Bridge	Bold Reason	Hail to Reason
Sire Sadler's Wells	Fairy Bridge	Bold Reason	Lalun
Sire Sadler's Wells	Fairy Bridge	Special	Forli
Sire Sadler's Wells	Fairy Bridge	Special	Thong
Dam Soul Dream	Alleged	Hoist The Flag	Tom Rolfe
Dam Soul Dream	Alleged	Hoist The Flag	Wavy Navy
Dam Soul Dream	Alleged	Princess Pout	Prince John
Dam Soul Dream	Alleged	Princess Pout	Determined Lady
Dam Soul Dream	Normia	Northfields	Northern Dancer
Dam Soul Dream	Normia	Northfields	Little Hut
Dam Soul Dream	Normia	Mia Pola	Relko
Dam Soul Dream	Normia	Mia Pola	Polamia
