= Waya =

French-bred Thoroughbred racehorse

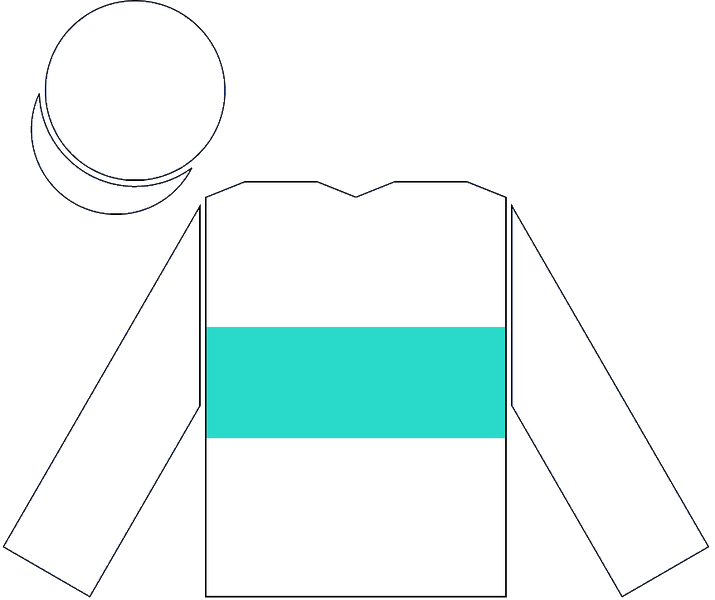
- Racing silks of George Strawbridge
- Sire: Faraway Son
- Grandsire: Ambiopoise
- Dam: War Path
- Damsire: Blue Prince
- Sex: Filly
- Foaled: 1974
- Country: France
- Colour: Bay
- Breeder: Dayton Ltd.
- Owner: 1) Daniel Wildenstein (France & USA); 2) P. M. Brant/G. W. Strawbridge (1979)
- Trainer: 1) Angel Penna, Sr. (France & USA); 2) David A. Whiteley (1979)
- Record: 29: 14-6-4
- Earnings: US$822,948

Major wins
- Prix de Royaumont (1977); Prix de l'Opéra (1977); Flower Bowl Handicap (1978); Diana Handicap (1978); Man o' War Stakes (1978); Aqueduct Turf Classic Invitational Stakes (1978); Santa Ana Handicap (1979); Santa Barbara Handicap (1979); Edgemere Handicap (1979); Top Flight Handicap (1979); Saratoga Cup Handicap (1979); Beldame Stakes (1979)

Awards
- American Champion Older Female Horse (1979)

Honours
- Waya Stakes at Saratoga Race Course

Waya (1974–2001) was a French Thoroughbred World Record holding racehorse who competed successfully in France and was a Champion in the United States. She was bred by the prominent French horseman Daniel Wildenstein through his breeding company, Dayton Ltd. Out of the mare War Path, her sire was Wildenstein's stallion Faraway Son, a Group 1 winner and the 1971 French Champion Miler.

== Racing in France ==
In 1977, the three-year-old Waya competed in France for Daniel Wildenstein, where she was conditioned for racing by the Argentine-born trainer Angel Penna, a future U.S. Racing Hall of Fame inductee. A winner in her debut at Saint-Cloud Racecourse, Waya also won the Group 3 Prix de Royaumont at Chantilly and the Group 2 Prix de l'Opéra at Longchamp. She ended her French racing career in October 1977 with a record of three wins, two seconds, and a third from her eight starts.

== Sent to the United States ==
For the 1978 racing season, Waya and her trainer Angel Penna competed on the New York Racing Association circuit, where she won the Flower Bowl Handicap and the Diana Handicap against fillies. In winning the Diana Handicap, she equaled the world record of 1:45 2/5 for 1 1/8 miles (1.8 km) on grass. She then beat her male counterparts in the Aqueduct Turf Classic Invitational Stakes and the Man o' War Stakes. Against a mostly male field of top American and European horses in the Washington, D.C. International Stakes at Laurel Park Racecourse in Laurel, Maryland, Waya ran third behind winner Mac Diarmida, whom she beat in the Man o' War Stakes.

== New owners and a Championship year ==
Waya was sold to Americans George Strawbridge and Peter Brant, who campaigned her in 1979. Under new trainer David Whiteley, she continued to perform at top levels despite being assigned high weights of as much as one hundred and thirty-one pounds. Of her five major wins that year, she once again defeated her male counterparts in the Edgemere Handicap and in her first-ever race on dirt, won the Top Flight Handicap at New York's Aqueduct Racetrack. She was voted the 1979 Eclipse Award as the American Champion Older Female Horse.

== As a broodmare ==
In early 1980, Waya was retired to broodmare duty at Derry Meeting Farm near Cochranville, Pennsylvania. She was bred to some of the world's top stallions including Red Ransom, Danzig, Seattle Slew, Riverman, Alydar, and twice to Gulch, Mr. Prospector and Nijinsky. Her first foal by Nijinsky was a filly named Vidalia, who raced in Italy and was the 1983 Italian Champion Two-Year-Old Filly. Of her ten other runners, Waya produced eight winners, of which one earned a graded stakes victory.

As a result of complications from laminitis, the twenty-seven-year-old Waya was humanely euthanized at Derry Meeting Farm on December 12, 2001.
