= John W. Galbreath =

American businessman

- Born: August 10, 1897; Derby, Ohio, U.S.
- Died: July 20, 1988 (aged 90); Galloway, Ohio, U.S.
- Education: Ohio University
- Occupations: Business man, horse breeder
- Awards: Columbus Award (1964); Eclipse Award for Outstanding Breeder (1974); Pillar of the Turf (2018)

John Wilmer Galbreath (August 10, 1897 – July 20, 1988) was an American building contractor and sportsman.

Born in Derby, Ohio, he grew up in Mount Sterling, Ohio, where he graduated from high school. He then graduated from Ohio University in 1922 and was a member of the Beta chapter of Delta Tau Delta International Fraternity. The non-denominational Galbreath Memorial Chapel on the Ohio University College Green was donated by Galbreath in memory of his first wife, Helen Mauck, who died in 1946.

In 1955, he married Dorothy Bryan Firestone, widow of Russell Allen Firestone of the Firestone Tire and Rubber Company.

== Pittsburgh Pirates ==
John Galbreath made a fortune in commercial property development, building skyscrapers in the United States and abroad. However, he may be best known for his role as owner of the Pittsburgh Pirates. He initially held a 20 percent stake in majority owner Frank E. McKinney's four-man syndicate when it purchased the Pirates on August 8, 1946. Galbreath's partners also included entertainer Bing Crosby and Pittsburgh attorney Thomas P. Johnson.

Not quite four years later, when McKinney sold his 50 percent stake, Galbreath acquired majority control on July 18, 1950. He was the Pirates' principal owner through 1985, during which the Pirates won three world series championships — in 1960, 1971, and 1979. Galbreath was the first owner to break the so-called "Million Dollar Mark" when he signed Dave Parker to a multi-year contract in 1979. During his tenure, the Pirates also drafted Hall of Fame player Roberto Clemente from the Brooklyn Dodgers in the 1954 Rule 5 draft.

== Thoroughbred horse racing ==
In 1935, Galbreath founded Darby Dan Farm near the Darby Creek in Galloway, Ohio. In 1949, he purchased the 650-acre (2.6 km^{2}) core property of Idle Hour Stock Farm in Kentucky and renamed it Darby Dan Farm.

Galbreath met his second wife Dorothy through thoroughbred racing. She had been involved in the sport with her first husband and would be very active with Darby Dan breeding and racing. The Darby Dan Farm raced several champion horses. John Galbreath is one of only four men to have raced both a Kentucky Derby winner and an Epsom Derby winner. The others are Paul Mellon, Michael Tabor, and Prince Ahmed bin Salman.

In the early 1950s, he served as chairman of the Greater New York Association. During his time, he oversaw the construction of the new Aqueduct Racetrack and the extensive rebuilding of Belmont Park.

John Galbreath was voted the 1972 Big Sport of Turfdom Award by the Turf Publicists of America and in 1974 he won the Eclipse Award for Outstanding Breeder.

In 2018, Galbreath was voted into the National Museum of Racing and Hall of Fame as one of its esteemed Pillars of the Turf. Galbreath died in Galloway, Ohio, three weeks prior to his 91st birthday.

== Awards and honors ==
- Golden Plate Award of the American Academy of Achievement (1961)
- Columbus Award (1964)
- Big Sport of Turfdom Award (1972)
- Eclipse Award for Outstanding Breeder (1974)
- National Museum of Racing and Hall of Fame, Pillar of the Turf (2018)
