= April Run =

Irish-bred Thoroughbred racehorse

- Sire: Run the Gantlet
- Grandsire: Tom Rolfe
- Dam: April Fancy
- Damsire: No Argument
- Sex: mare
- Foaled: 1978-1994 (aged 15–16)
- Country: Ireland
- Colour: Bay
- Breeder: F. Feeney
- Owner: Diana M. Firestone
- Trainer: François Boutin
- Record: 18: 8-2-3
- Earnings: $1,095,022

Major wins
- Prix Cléopâtre (1981); Prix de Pomone (1981); Prix Vermeille (1981); Turf Classic Invitational Stakes (1981, 1982); Prix Foy (1982); Washington, D.C. International (1982)

Awards
- American Champion Female Turf Horse (1982)

Honours
- April Run Stakes at Laurel Park

April Run (1978–1994) was an Irish-bred Thoroughbred racehorse who competed internationally and who in 1982 was voted a Champion both in France and the United States.

A granddaughter of U.S. Hall of Famer Tom Rolfe, April Run was bred at Bertram & Diana Firestone's Gilltown Stud in Kilcullen, County Kildare, Ireland. The filly was trained in France by François Boutin where she won several important races before finishing a fast-closing third in the 1981 Prix de l'Arc de Triomphe.

She was then shipped to the United States where she won the first of her two consecutive Turf Classic Invitational Stakes. She finished second in the 1981 Washington, D.C. International, but came back to win the same race in 1982. That same year, she was sent to Japan where she finished third in the Japan Cup.

Retired to broodmare service at the end of her four-year-old racing season, April Run was the Dam of 7 foals to race, producing 5 winners. In 1992, she was sent to a breeding farm in Japan. She died on April 28, 1994.
