= Joe Hirsch =

American horse racing columnist (1928–2009)

- Born: Joe Hirsch; February 27, 1928; New York City, New York, U.S.
- Died: January 9, 2009 (aged 80); New York City, New York, U.S.
- Occupation: Journalist
- Known for: His work for the Daily Racing Form
- Awards: Eclipse Award (1978); Lord Derby Award (1981); Big Sport of Turfdom Award (1983); The Jockey Club Medal (1989); Eclipse Award of Merit (1992); National Museum of Racing and Hall of Fame (2024)

Joe Hirsch (February 27, 1928 – January 9, 2009) was an American horse racing columnist and the founding president of the National Turf Writers Association.

== Early life and education ==
Joe Hirsch was born on February 27, 1928, in New York City, New York, U.S.

He graduated from New York University with a degree in journalism, then served for four years in the United States Army.

== Career ==
Hirsch joined the staff of the New York Times but remained only a short time before going to work at The Morning Telegraph, then the companion paper of the Daily Racing Form, with which he became associated in 1954.

In 1959, he was elected as the first president of the National Turf Writers Association.

Hirsch also became known as the roommate of New York Jets rookie quarterback Joe Namath upon Namath's arrival in New York City, living together from 1965 to 1976.

He was named executive columnist of the Daily Racing Form in 1974 and held the position until his retirement in 2003.

Until his death, Hirsch served as a member of the selection committee for the National Museum of Racing and Hall of Fame.

== Death ==
Joe Hirsch died on January 9, 2009, at St. Luke's Hospital in New York City at the age of 80.

== Legacy ==
Often referred to as the "dean" of Thoroughbred racing writers, Hirsch is one of two American writers (the other is John Englehardt) to win both the Eclipse Award for outstanding writing and the Lord Derby Award in London from the Horserace Writers and Reporters Association of Great Britain. He also received the Eclipse Award of Merit (1992), the Big Sport of Turfdom Award (1983), and The Jockey Club Medal (1989), and was designated as the honored guest at the 1994 Thoroughbred Club of America's Testimonial Dinner. The annual Grade 1 Joe Hirsch Turf Classic Invitational at Belmont Park was named in his honor, as are the press boxes at the Saratoga Race Course and Churchill Downs racecourses. The Breeders' Cup Ltd. presents the Joe Hirsch Award to a member of the media for their coverage of the Breeders' Cup.

In 2005, the University of Kentucky and the National Thoroughbred Racing Association (NTRA) announced the creation of the Joe Hirsch Scholarship to assist a worthy student interested in pursuing a career in Thoroughbred racing journalism. The first recipient of the scholarship was Ms. Amanda Duckworth.

Hirsch was selected for induction into the National Museum of Racing and Hall of Fame in 2024 as a "Pillar of the Turf."

== See also ==
- Joe Hirsch Turf Classic Stakes

== Bibliography ==
- First Century : Daily Racing Form chronicles 100 years of Thoroughbred Racing (1996)
- The Grand senor : The Fabulous Career of Horatio Luro (1989)
- Kentucky Derby : The Chance of a Lifetime (1988) co-authored with Jim Bolus.
- In The Winner's Circle: The Jones Boys of Calumet Farm (1974) co-authored with Gene Plowden
- A Treasury of Questions and Answers from the Morning Telegraph and Daily Racing Form - Illustrations by Peb (1969)
