= Daily Racing Form =

American horse racing publication

- Owner: Affinity Interactive
- Founder: Frank Brunell
- Founded: 1894
- Language: English
- Headquarters: New York City
- Website: www.drf.com

The Daily Racing Form (DRF) (referred to as the Racing Form or "Form" and sometimes "telegraph" or "telly") is a tabloid newspaper founded in 1894 in Chicago, Illinois, by Frank Brunell. The paper publishes the past performances of racehorses as a statistical service for bettors covering horse racing in North America.

The first edition of the DRF was published in Chicago in November 1894. DRF publishes up to 35 regional editions every day but Christmas.

In cooperation with the National Thoroughbred Racing Association and the National Turf Writers and Broadcasters Association, the Daily Racing Form selects the winners of the annual Eclipse Awards.

In 1922, the DRF publishing company was sold to Moses Annenberg's Triangle Publications, which would eventually be owned by Walter Annenberg.

In 2007, the Wicks Group sold DRF to Arlington Capital Partners for nearly $200 million. Arlington sold the DRF's parent company, Sports Information Group (SIG), to Z Capital Partners in 2017 for less than $100 million. In 2021, Z Capital merged SIG into a sister company, Affinity Gaming, to form Affinity Interactive. In 2021, DRF released the DRF Sport website in September, and in October released the DRF Cash Grab free-to-play sports prediction app. Together with Affinity Interactive, DRF released its first online sports book. The DRF Bets sports went live in Iowa in January 2022.

== See also ==
- Daily Racing Form Horse Racing
