= National Turf Writers Association =

American association of journalists, columnists and other writers

The National Turf Writers Association (NTWA) is an American association of journalists, columnists and other writers involved with reporting on the horse racing industry. The organization was founded by prominent sports writer Joe Hirsch who served as its first president.

The association currently has approximately 225 members and meets twice a year at the Kentucky Derby and the Breeders' Cup. In cooperation with the National Thoroughbred Racing Association and the Daily Racing Form, the National Turf Writers Association selects the winners of the annual Eclipse Awards. As well, it presents other awards:

- Joe Palmer Award for meritorious service to racing – named for the late racing editor at the New York Herald Tribune
- Mr. Fitz Award for typifying the spirit of racing – named for the late trainer, Sunny Jim Fitzsimmons
- Walter Haight Award for lifetime excellence in turf writing – named for the Washington Post racing columnist
- Isaac Murphy Award to the jockey with the year's highest winning percentage – named for African American jockey, Isaac Burns Murphy

== See also ==
- United States Harness Writers Association
- National Sportscasters and Sportswriters Association
