= 2011 in sports =

The year 2011 in sports saw a number of significant events, some of which are listed below.

== Calendar by month ==
=== January ===
Date	Sport	Venue/Event	Status	Winner/s
10	American football	(United States) 2011 BCS National Championship Game	Domestic	(Alabama) Auburn University
26 Dec 2010–5	Ice hockey	(United States) 2011 World Junior Ice Hockey Championships	International	Russia
21	Marathon	(United Arab Emirates) Dubai Marathon	International	(Kenya) David Barmasai / (Ethiopia) Aselefech Mergia

=== February ===
Date	Sport	Venue/Event	Status	Winner/s
6	American football	(United States) Super Bowl XLV	Domestic	(Wisconsin) Green Bay Packers

=== March ===
- 31 March – 28 October: Baseball, (United States) / (Canada) 2011 Major League Baseball season. 2011 World Series: (Missouri) St. Louis Cardinals.

=== April ===
- 17: Marathon, (United Kingdom) London Marathon. Winners: (Kenya) Emmanuel Mutai, Mary Keitany.
- 18: Marathon, (United States) Boston Marathon. Winners: (Kenya) Geoffrey Mutai, Caroline Kilel.

=== May ===
- 18: Association football, (Republic of Ireland) 2011 UEFA Europa League final. Winner: (Portugal) Porto.
- 21: Rugby union, (England) 2011 Heineken Cup final. Winner: (Ireland) Leinster Rugby.
- 28: Association football, (England) 2011 UEFA Champions League final. Winner: (Spain) FC Barcelona.
- 31 May — 12 June: Basketball, (United States) / (Canada) 2011 NBA Finals. Winner: (Texas) Dallas Mavericks.

=== June ===
- 12: Formula One, (Canada) 2011 Canadian Grand Prix. Winner: (United Kingdom) Jenson Button.
- 18 — July 3: Basketball, (Poland) EuroBasket Women 2011. Winner: Russia
- 25: MotoGP, (Netherlands) 2011 Dutch TT. Winner: (United States) Ben Spies.
- 26: Formula One, (Spain) 2011 European Grand Prix. Winner: (Germany) Sebastian Vettel.
- 26 — 17 July: Association football, (Germany) 2011 FIFA Women's World Cup. Winner: Japan

=== July ===
- 24: Formula One, (Germany) 2011 German Grand Prix. Winner: (United Kingdom) Lewis Hamilton.

=== August ===
- 29 — September 12: Tennis, (United States) 2011 US Open. Winners in singles (Serbia) Novak Djokovic, (Australia) Samantha Stosur.
- 30 — September 11: Basketball, 2011 FIBA Americas Championship. Winner: Argentina
- 31 — September 18: Basketball, (Lithuania) EuroBasket 2011. Winner: Spain

=== September ===
- 7 — 11: Basketball, 2011 FIBA Oceania Championship. Winner: Australia
- 7 — 11: Basketball, 2011 FIBA Oceania Championship for Women. Winner: Australia
- 24 — October 1: Basketball, (Colombia) 2011 FIBA Americas Championship for Women. Winner: Brazil
- 25: Formula One, 2011 Singapore Grand Prix. Winner: (Germany) Sebastian Vettel
- 25: Marathon, (Germany) Berlin Marathon. Winners: (Kenya) Patrick Makau Musyoki, (Kenya) Florence Kiplagat.

=== October ===
- 9: Marathon, (United States) Chicago Marathon. Winners: (Kenya) Moses Mosop, (Russia) Liliya Shobukhova.
- 16: Formula One, (South Korea) 2011 Korean Grand Prix. Winner: (Germany) Sebastian Vettel.

=== November ===
- 7: Marathon, (United States) New York City Marathon. Winners: (Kenya) Geoffrey Mutai, (Ethiopia) Firehiwot Dado.
- 13: Formula One, (United Arab Emirates) 2011 Abu Dhabi Grand Prix. Winner: (United Kingdom) Lewis Hamilton.

=== December ===
- 25 – April 2012: Basketball, (United States) / (Canada) 2011–12 NBA season.

== American football ==
- Super Bowl XLV – the Green Bay Packers (NFC) won 31–25 over the Pittsburgh Steelers (AFC)
  - Location: AT&T Stadium
  - Attendance: 103,219
  - MVP: Aaron Rodgers, QB (Green Bay)
- January 8 – Peyton Manning plays his final game in an Indianapolis Colts uniform, a 16–17 loss to the New York Jets in the wild-card round. The next season Manning would sit out the entire 2011 season to undergo neck surgeries and in that offseason, was released by the Colts and subsequently signed with the Denver Broncos in free agency, where he led them to 5 straight playoff appearances, Super Bowl XLVIII, and to their 3rd championship title in Super Bowl 50.
- January 10 – 2011 BCS National Championship Game, University of Phoenix Stadium, Glendale, Arizona: The Auburn Tigers defeated the Oregon Ducks 22–19 claiming the 2010 college football season national championship.
- April 28–30 – 2011 NFL draft at Radio City Music Hall in New York City. The Carolina Panthers selected quarterback Cam Newton of Auburn as the first overall pick.
- July 8–16 – The 2011 IFAF World Championship was held in Austria. The USA defeated Canada 50–7 in the gold medal match to win their second straight title.
- December 10 – 2011 Heisman Trophy was awarded to Robert Griffin III

== Aquatics ==
- 2011 FINA Men's Water Polo World League
- 2011 FINA World Junior Swimming Championships
- March 8–13, 2011: 2011 European Diving Championships in Turin, Italy
- July 16–31, 2011: 2011 World Aquatics Championships in Shanghai, China
- December 8–11, 2011: 2011 European Short Course Swimming Championships in Szczecin, Poland

== Association football ==
- January 7–29 – 2011 AFC Asian Cup in Qatar
  - Fourth title for Japan. Runner up Australia. Third place South Korea. MVP Keisuke Honda
- April 2 and 17 – OFC Champions League final won by Auckland City FC
- April 20 and 27 – CONCACAF Champions League finals:
  - (Mexico) C.F. Monterrey defeat (United States) Real Salt Lake 3–2 on aggregate.
- May 28 – UEFA Champions League final in London:
  - (Spain) FC Barcelona defeat (England) Manchester United 3–1.
- June 5–25 – 2011 CONCACAF Gold Cup in the United States
  - Winner: Mexico. Runner-up: United States. Semifinalists: Honduras, Panama. MVP Javier Hernández.
- June 15 and 22 – Copa Libertadores finals
  - (Brazil) Santos defeat (Uruguay) Peñarol 2–1 on aggregate.
- June 17 – July 1 – 2011 CPISRA Football 7-a-side World Championships in the Netherlands
- June 18 – July 10 – 2011 FIFA U-17 World Cup in Mexico
  - Mexico won the cup as host being the first team to achieve that, defeating Uruguay 2–0 and achieving their second title in the category.
- June 26 – July 17 – 2011 FIFA Women's World Cup in Germany
  - First title for Japan. Runner up United States. Third place Sweden. Best Player Homare Sawa
- July 1–24 – 2011 Copa América in Argentina
  - 15th title for Uruguay. Runner-up Paraguay. Third place Peru. Best Player Luis Suárez.
- July 29 – August 20 – 2011 FIFA U-20 World Cup in Colombia
  - Fifth title for Brazil. Runner up Portugal. Third place Mexico. Best Player Henrique
- November 5 – AFC Champions League final
  - (Qatar) Al-Sadd defeat (South Korea) Jeonbuk Hyundai Motors 2–2 (4–2 in penalties).
- November 6 and 12 – CAF Champions League finals
  - (Tunisia) Espérance ST defeat (Morocco) Wydad Casablanca 1–0 on aggregate.
- December 8–18 – 2011 FIFA Club World Cup in Japan
  - Final (Spain) FC Barcelona defeat (Brazil) Santos 4–0.

== Athletics ==
- January 21–30 – 2011 IPC Athletics World Championships in Christchurch, New Zealand
- August 27 – September 4 – 2011 World Championships in Athletics in Daegu, South Korea

== Bandy ==
- January 30, Russia becomes world champion

== Basketball ==
- February 20: 2011 NBA All-Star Game at Staples Center, Los Angeles.
  - West 148 beat 143 East
- May 8: Euroleague
  - Panathinaikos beats Maccabi Tel Aviv 78–70 and wins its sixth title in Barcelona. Dimitris Diamantidis was named MVP.
- May 31 – June 12: 2011 NBA Finals
  - The Western Conference champion Dallas Mavericks defeated the Eastern Conference champion Miami Heat, 4–2, to win their first NBA title. German player Dirk Nowitzki was named Finals MVP.
- August 30 – September 11 – FIBA Americas Championship 2011 in Mar del Plata, Argentina
  - Second title for (gold) Argentina. (silver) Brazil and (bronze) Dominican Republic. MVP: Luis Scola (ARG)
- September 3–18 – EuroBasket 2011 in Lithuania
  - Second title for (gold) Spain. (silver) France and (bronze) Russia. MVP: Juan Carlos Navarro (ESP)
- October 2–7: 2011 WNBA Finals
  - The Western Conference champion Minnesota Lynx defeated the Eastern Conference champion Atlanta Dream, 3–0, to win their first WNBA title. Seimone Augustus was named Finals MVP.

== Beach Soccer ==
- September 1–11 – The 2011 FIFA Beach Soccer World Cup in Ravenna, Italy.
  - Russia puts an end to Brazil's dominance, defeating them in the final by the score of 12–8. Portugal claimed third place.
- June 7–9, 2011 — Florida Beach Soccer FC wins the North American Sand Soccer Championship (NASSC)Virginia Beach, Virginia
- November, 2011 — Florida Beach Soccer FC also claims victory at BagoSports Beach Football Championship in Trinidad and Tobago securing the Caribbean Championshiptitle, going undefeated in the tournament winning 5–3.

== Beach volleyball ==
- June 13–19 – The 2011 Beach Volleyball World Championships in Rome
  - Men's Event: Emanuel Rego, Alison Cerutti (BRA)
  - Women's Event: Larissa França, Juliana Felisberta (BRA)

== Boxing ==
- January 29 – Timothy Bradley defeats Devon Alexander by a tenth-round technical decision. The fight was stopped due to a cut Alexander had received from an accidental headbutt in the third round, which was made worse by two more headbutts in the eighth round and a final fourth headbutt in the tenth round. Both fighters came in with undefeated records and the fight was initially praised as one of the few good match-ups between two top-ranked Americans in recent years. With the win, Bradley unified the light welterweight titles by defending his WBO title and winning Alexander's WBC title.
- February 19 – Nonito Donaire defeats Fernando Montiel by technical knockout in the second round to unify the WBO and WBC bantamweight titles. Donaire started the fight strong by controlling most of the first round, landing a left hook that briefly stunned Montiel. In the second round Donaire started landing a few combinations before finishing Montiel with a solid hook that knocked out his opponent.
- March 12 – Sergio Gabriel Martínez knocks out undefeated Sergiy Dzindziruk in the eighth round to win the vacant WBC diamond belt middleweight championship.
- March 12 – Miguel Cotto knocks out Ricardo Mayorga in the twelfth round to retain his WBA world light middleweight title.
- March 19 – Vitali Klitschko knocks out Odlanier Solís in the first round to retain his WBC heavyweight title for the sixth time. The knockout came as a surprise after Solís appeared to have sustained serious knee injury. Initially following the stoppage, Vitali Klitschko was angry at Solís and felt he took a dive. However following the fight Solís was taken to a hospital, where a scan revealed tears to his anterior cruciate ligament and external meniscus, as well as cartilage damage in his right knee.
- April 2 – Giovanni Segura knocks out Iván Calderón in the third round in a repeat of 2010's fight of the year.
- May 7 – Manny Pacquiao easily defeats Shane Mosley, retaining his WBO welterweight title by unanimous decision.
- July 2 – Wladimir Klitschko defeats David Haye by unanimous decision, adding Haye's WBA heavyweight title to the four he already held.

== Canadian football ==
- November 25 – 47th Vanier Cup game at BC Place Stadium in Vancouver – McMaster Marauders defeat Laval Rouge et Or 41–38
- November 27 – 99th Grey Cup game at BC Place Stadium in Vancouver – BC Lions defeat Winnipeg Blue Bombers 34–23

== Canoeing ==
- August 17– 21, 2011: 2011 ICF Canoe Sprint World Championships in Szeged, Hungary
- September 7–11, 2011: 2011 ICF Canoe Slalom World Championships in Bratislava, Slovakia

== Cheerleading ==
Cheerleading Worlds

April 28, – May 2, – The Walt Disney World Resort, Orlando, Florida, USA

== Cricket ==
- February 19 – April 2 – 2011 Cricket World Cup in Sri Lanka, India, Bangladesh
  - The tournament was won by India who defeated Sri Lanka by 6 wickets. India became the first host-nation to win the world cup with final played in the host country itself. Captain Mahendra Singh Dhoni played a captain's knock of unbeaten 91 in the final and was adjudged man of the match.
- Dates TBA – ICC Champions Trophy will take place.
- April 8 – May 28 – 2011 IPL in India. Chennai Super Kings beat Royal Challengers Bangalore by 58 runs in the final to win for the second consecutive year.

== Curling ==
=== 2010–11 curling season ===
World Championships

- Capital One World Women's Curling Championship (Esbjerg, Denmark, Mar. 19–27)
  - Women's winner: Sweden (Anette Norberg) def. Canada (Amber Holland)
- Ford World Men's Curling Championship (Regina, Saskatchewan, Apr. 2–10)
  - Men's winner: Canada (Jeff Stoughton) def. Scotland (Tom Brewster)
- World Mixed Doubles Curling Championship (St. Paul, Minnesota, Apr. 15–24)
  - Winner: Switzerland def. Russia

=== 2011–12 curling season ===
Season of Champions

- Canada Cup of Curling (Cranbrook, British Columbia, Nov. 30 – Dec. 4)
  - Men's winner: (Alberta) Kevin Martin def. (Ontario) Glenn Howard
  - Women's winner: (Manitoba) Jennifer Jones def. (Manitoba) Chelsea Carey

== Fencing ==
- October 8–16: 2011 World Fencing Championships in Catania, Italy

== Figure skating ==
- January 24–30 – 2011 European Figure Skating Championships in Bern, Switzerland
- February 15–20 – 2011 Four Continents Figure Skating Championships in Taipei, Taiwan
- February 28 – March 6 – 2011 World Junior Figure Skating Championships in Gangneung, South Korea
- April 24 – May 1 – 2011 World Figure Skating Championships in Moscow, Russia

== Floorball ==
- Women's World Floorball Championships
  - Champion: Sweden
- Men's under-19 World Floorball Championships
  - Champion: Finland
- Champions Cup
  - Men's champion: (Finland) SSV Helsinki
  - Women's champion: (Sweden) IF Djurgårdens IBF

== Gymnastics ==
- 2011 European Artistic Gymnastics Championships
- 2011 Rhythmic Gymnastics European Championships
- 2011 World Rhythmic Gymnastics Championships
- 2011 World Artistic Gymnastics Championships

== Handball ==
- January 13–30 – 2011 World Men's Handball Championship in Sweden
  - (gold) France, (silver) Denmark and (bronze) Spain. Fourth Title for France. MVP = Nikola Karabatić (FRA)
- December 3–16 – 2011 World Women's Handball Championship in Brazil
  - (gold) Norway, (silver) France and (bronze) Spain.

== Horse racing ==
Steeplechases

- Cheltenham Gold Cup – Long Run
- Grand National – Ballabriggs
- Grand Steeple-Chase de Paris – Mid Dancer
- Nakayama Grand Jump – Meiner Neos

Flat races

- Australia:
  - Cox Plate – Pinker Pinker
  - Melbourne Cup – Dunaden
- Canadian Triple Crown:
  1. Queen's Plate – Inglorious
  2. Prince of Wales Stakes – Pender Harbour
  3. Breeders' Stakes –Pender Harbour

- Luis Contreras becomes the first jockey to win the Canadian Triple Crown aboard two different horses in the same year.

- Dubai, United Arab Emirates: Dubai World Cup – Victoire Pisa
- France: Prix de l'Arc de Triomphe – Danedream
- Hong Kong: Hong Kong International Races
  - Hong Kong Vase – Dunaden
  - Hong Kong Sprint – Lucky Nine
  - Hong Kong Mile – Able One
  - Hong Kong Cup – California Memory
- Ireland: Irish Derby – Treasure Beach
- Japan: Japan Cup – Buena Vista
- English Triple Crown:
  1. 2,000 Guineas Stakes – Frankel
  2. Epsom Derby – Pour Moi
  3. St. Leger Stakes – Masked Marvel
- United States Triple Crown:
  1. Kentucky Derby – Animal Kingdom
  2. Preakness Stakes – Shackleford
  3. Belmont Stakes – Ruler on Ice
- Breeders' Cup World Thoroughbred Championships at Churchill Downs, Louisville, Kentucky (both days arranged in race card order):
  - Day 1:
    1. Breeders' Cup Juvenile Sprint – Secret Circle
    2. Breeders' Cup Juvenile Fillies Turf – Stephanie's Kitten
    3. Breeders' Cup Filly & Mare Sprint – Musical Romance
    4. Breeders' Cup Juvenile Fillies – My Miss Aurelia
    5. Breeders' Cup Filly & Mare Turf – Perfect Shirl
    6. Breeders' Cup Ladies' Classic – Royal Delta
  - Day 2:
    1. Breeders' Cup Marathon – Afleet Again
    2. Breeders' Cup Juvenile Turf – Wrote
    3. Breeders' Cup Sprint – Amazombie
    4. Breeders' Cup Turf Sprint – Regally Ready
    5. Breeders' Cup Turf – St Nicholas Abbey
    6. Breeders' Cup Dirt Mile – Caleb's Posse
    7. Breeders' Cup Juvenile – Hansen
    8. Breeders' Cup Mile – Court Vision
    9. Breeders' Cup Classic – Drosselmeyer

== Ice hockey ==
- December 26 (2010)–January 5: 2011 World Junior Ice Hockey Championships in Buffalo, United States.
  - (gold) Russia (silver) Canada (bronze) United States
- April 29, – May 15, 2011: 2011 IIHF World Championship in Slovakia, with games being played in Bratislava and Košice.
  - (gold) Finland (silver) Sweden (bronze) Czech Republic
- June 15: The Boston Bruins defeat the Vancouver Canucks 4–0 in game seven to win the 2011 Stanley Cup Finals.
- September 7: The entire active roster of the Lokomotiv Yaroslavl team is killed in the 2011 Lokomotiv Yaroslavl plane crash.
- October 6: Start of the 2011–12 NHL regular season.

== Ice sledge hockey ==
- February 12–20 – 2011 IPC Ice Sledge Hockey European Championships in Sollefteå

== Kickboxing ==
The following is a list of major noteworthy kickboxing events during 2011 in chronological order.

Date	Event	Alternate Name/s	Location	Attendance	Notes
December 31	Fight For Japan: Genki Desu Ka Omisoka 2011	Fight for Japan. How are you! New Year! 2011	Saitama, Japan	24,606	—N/a

== Korfball ==
- October 27 – 5 November: 2011 Korfball World Championship in Shaoxing, China
  - (gold) Netherlands (silver) Belgium (bronze) Chinese Taipei

== Mixed martial arts ==
The following is a list of major noteworthy MMA events during 2011 in chronological order.

Date	Event	Alternate Name/s	Location	Attendance	PPV Buyrate	Notes
January 1	UFC 125: Resolution	—N/a	(United States) Las Vegas, Nevada, USA	12,874	270,000	—N/a
January 22	UFC: Fight For The Troops 2	UFC Fight Night 23	(United States) Killeen, Texas, USA	3,200	—N/a	—N/a
January 29	Strikeforce: Diaz vs. Cyborg	—N/a	(United States) San Jose, California, USA	9,059	—N/a	—N/a
February 5	UFC 126: Silva vs. Belfort	—N/a	(United States) Las Vegas, Nevada, USA	10,893	725,000	—N/a
February 12	Strikeforce / M-1 Global: Fedor vs. Silva	Strikeforce: Fedor vs. Silva	(United States) East Rutherford, New Jersey, USA	11,287	—N/a	Quarterfinals to 2011 Strikeforce Heavyweight GP tournament.
February 25	MFC 28: Supremacy	—N/a	Edmonton, Alberta, Canada	—N/a	—N/a	—N/a
February 26	UFC 127: Penn vs. Fitch	—N/a	Sydney, Australia	18,186	260,000	—N/a
February 26	BAMMA 5: Daley vs. Shirai	—N/a	Manchester, England	—N/a	—N/a	—N/a
March 3	UFC Live: Sanchez vs. Kampmann	—N/a	(United States) Louisville, Kentucky, USA	8,319	—N/a	—N/a
March 5	Strikeforce: Feijao vs. Henderson	Strikeforce: Columbus	(United States) Columbus, Ohio, USA	7,123	—N/a	—N/a
March 5	Bellator XXXV	—N/a	(United States) Lemoore, California, USA	—N/a	—N/a	Start of Bellator Season 4.
March 12	Bellator XXXVI	—N/a	(United States) Shreveport, Louisiana, USA	—N/a	—N/a	—N/a
March 19	Bellator XXXVII	—N/a	(United States) Concho, Oklahoma, USA	—N/a	—N/a	—N/a
March 19	UFC 128: Shogun vs. Jones	—N/a	(United States) Newark, New Jersey, USA	12,619	445,000	—N/a
March 26	Bellator XXXVIII	—N/a	(United States) Tunica, Mississippi, USA	—N/a	—N/a	—N/a
March 26	UFC Fight Night: Nogueira vs. Davis	UFC Fight Night 24 UFC Fight Night: Seattle	(United States) Seattle, USA	13,741	—N/a	—N/a
April 2	Bellator XXXIX	—N/a	(United States) Uncasville, Connecticut, USA	—N/a	—N/a	—N/a
April 8	MFC 29: Conquer	—N/a	Windsor, Ontario, Canada	—N/a	—N/a	—N/a
April 9	Bellator XL	—N/a	(United States) Newkirk, Oklahoma, USA	—N/a	—N/a	—N/a
April 9	Strikeforce: Diaz vs. Daley	—N/a	(United States) San Diego, California, USA	—N/a	—N/a	—N/a
April 16	Bellator XLI	—N/a	(United States) Yuma, Arizona, USA	—N/a	—N/a	—N/a
April 23	Bellator XLII	—N/a	(United States) Concho, Oklahoma, USA	—N/a	—N/a	—N/a
April 30	UFC 129: St-Pierre vs. Shields	—N/a	Toronto, Ontario, Canada	55,724	800,000 (Min.); 900,000 (Max.)	Randy Couture announces his retirement after nearly 14 years of competition.
May 6	Tachi Palace Fights 9	—N/a	(United States) Lemoore, California, USA	—N/a	—N/a	—N/a
May 7	Bellator XLIII	—N/a	(United States) Newkirk, Oklahoma, USA	—N/a	—N/a	—N/a
May 14	Bellator XLIV	—N/a	(United States) Atlantic City, New Jersey, USA	—N/a	—N/a	—N/a
May 21	Bellator XLV	—N/a	(United States) Lake Charles, Louisiana, USA	—N/a	—N/a	End of Bellator season 4.
May 21	BAMMA 6: Watson vs. Ninja	—N/a	London, England	—N/a	—N/a	Murilo Rua announces his retirement after 11 years of competition.
May 29	Dream: Fight for Japan!	Dream Japan GP – 2011 Bantamweight Japan Tournament	Saitama, Japan	6,522	—N/a	—N/a
June 4	The Ultimate Fighter 13 Finale	—N/a	(United States) Las Vegas, Nevada, USA	—N/a	—N/a	—N/a
June 10	MFC 30: Up Close and Personal	—N/a	Edmonton, Alberta, Canada	—N/a	—N/a	—N/a
June 11	UFC 131: dos Santos vs. Carwin	—N/a	Vancouver, British Columbia, Canada	14,685	325,000 (Min.); 335,000 (Max.)	—N/a
June 18	Strikeforce: Overeem vs. Werdum	Strikeforce: Dallas	(United States) Dallas, Texas, USA	—N/a	—N/a	The event will feature the first women's bouts ever held by Zuffa.
June 25	Bellator XLVI	—N/a	(United States) Hollywood, Florida, USA	—N/a	—N/a	Start of Bellator 2011 Summer Series.
June 26	UFC Live: Kongo vs. Barry	—N/a	(United States) Pittsburgh, Pennsylvania, USA	7,792	—N/a	—N/a
July 2	UFC 132: Cruz vs. Faber 2	—N/a	(United States) Las Vegas, Nevada, USA	13,109	350,000 (Min.); 375,000 (Max.)	—N/a
July 16	Dream: Japan GP Final	—N/a	Tokyo, Japan	8,142	—N/a	—N/a
July 23	Bellator XLVII	—N/a	Rama, Ontario, Canada	—N/a	—N/a	—N/a
July 30	Strikeforce: Fedor vs. Henderson	—N/a	(United States) Hoffman Estates, Illinois, USA	—N/a	—N/a	—N/a
August 6	UFC 133: Evans vs. Ortiz 2	—N/a	(United States) Philadelphia, Pennsylvania, USA	11,583	—N/a	—N/a
August 14	UFC Live: Hardy vs. Lytle	—N/a	(United States) Milwaukee, Wisconsin, USA	6,751	—N/a	—N/a
August 20	Bellator XLVIII	—N/a	(United States) Uncasville, Connecticut, USA	—N/a	—N/a	End of Bellator 2011 Summer Series.
August 27	UFC 134: Silva vs. Okami	UFC: Rio	Rio de Janeiro, Brazil	—N/a	—N/a	—N/a
September 3	ONE FC: Champion vs. Champion	—N/a	Kallang, Singapore	—N/a	—N/a	—N/a
September 10	Strikeforce: Heavyweight Grand Prix Semifinals	—N/a	(United States) Cincinnati, Ohio, USA	—N/a	—N/a	—N/a
September 10	Bellator XLIX	—N/a	(United States) Atlantic City, New Jersey, USA	—N/a	—N/a	Start of Bellator Season 5
September 10	BAMMA 7	—N/a	Birmingham, England	—N/a	—N/a	—N/a
September 17	UFC Fight Night: Battle on the Bayou	UFC Fight Night 25	(United States) New Orleans, Louisiana, USA	—N/a	—N/a	—N/a
September 17	Bellator L	—N/a	(United States) Hollywood, Florida, USA	—N/a	—N/a	—N/a
September 24	Dream 17	—N/a	Saitama, Japan	—N/a	—N/a	—N/a
September 24	Bellator LI	—N/a	(United States) Canton, Ohio, USA	—N/a	—N/a	—N/a
September 24	UFC 135	—N/a	(United States) Denver, Colorado, USA	—N/a	—N/a	—N/a
October 1	UFC on Versus 6	—N/a	(United States) Washington, D.C., USA	—N/a	—N/a	—N/a
October 1	Bellator LII	—N/a	(United States) Lake Charles, Louisiana, USA	—N/a	—N/a	—N/a
October 8	UFC 136: Edgar vs. Maynard III	—N/a	(United States) Houston, Texas, USA	—N/a	—N/a	—N/a
October 8	Bellator LIII	—N/a	USA	—N/a	—N/a	—N/a
October 15	Bellator LIV	—N/a	(United States) Atlantic City, New Jersey, USA	—N/a	—N/a	—N/a
October 29	UFC 137: St-Pierre vs. Diaz	—N/a	(United States) Las Vegas, Nevada, USA	—N/a	—N/a	—N/a
November 5	UFC 138: Leben vs. Muñoz	—N/a	Birmingham, England	—N/a	—N/a	The main event was the first five-round non-title fight in the history of the UFC.
November 12	UFC on Fox: Velasquez vs. Dos Santos	—N/a	(United States) Anaheim, California, USA	—N/a	—N/a	The UFC's debut on the Fox Network.
November 19	Bellator Event	—N/a	(United States) Hollywood, Florida, USA	—N/a	—N/a	End of Bellator Season 5.
December 3	The Ultimate Fighter 14 Finale	—N/a	(United States) Las Vegas, Nevada USA	—N/a	—N/a	—N/a
December 10	UFC 140	—N/a	Toronto, Ontario, Canada	—N/a	—N/a	—N/a
December 31	Fight For Japan: Genki Desu Ka Omisoka 2011	Fight for Japan. How are you! New Year! 2011	Saitama, Japan	24,606	—N/a	—N/a

== Multi-sport events ==
- 2011 Winter Universiade
- 2011 Summer Universiade
- 2011 All-Africa Games
- 2011 Pan American Games
- 2011 Asian Winter Games
- 2011 South Asian Winter Games
- 2011 Pacific Games
- 2011 South East Asian Games
- 2011 Military World Games
- 2011 Commonwealth Youth Games
- 2011 Special Olympics World Summer Games
- 2011 Island Games
- 2011 ALBA Games
- 2011 European Youth Winter Olympic Festival
- 2011 European Youth Summer Olympic Festival

== Netball ==
International tournaments

Date	Tournament	Winners	Runners up
7–9 June	2011 Pacific Netball Series	Fiji	Cook Islands
9 Jun–30 Oct	2011 Constellation Cup	Australia	New Zealand
3–10 July	2011 World Netball Championships	Australia	New Zealand
6–15 September	2011 All-Africa Games	Uganda	Tanzania
3–6 October	2011 Taini Jamison Trophy Series	New Zealand	England
25–27 November	2011 World Netball Series	England	New Zealand

Major leagues

Host	League	Winners	Runners up
Australia/New Zealand	ANZ Championship	Queensland Firebirds	Northern Mystics
United Kingdom	Netball Superleague	Hertfordshire Mavericks	Surrey Storm

== Rink Hockey ==
- 2011 Rink Hockey Asian Championship
- 2011 Ladies Rink Hockey European Championship
- 2011 Rink Hockey World Championship San Juan, Argentina
- 2011 Rink Hockey World Championship U-20, in Barcelos, Portugal
  - won by Spain
- 2011 Ladies Rink Hockey European Championship

== Road bicycle racing ==
- May 7–29: 2011 Giro d'Italia
  - Alberto Contador sealed overall victory in the Giro d'Italia for the second time in his career. The win was later awarded to second-place finisher Michele Scarponi after Contador was given a retroactive ban following his positive test for clenbuterol at the 2010 Tour de France.
- July 2–24: 2011 Tour de France
  - Australian Cadel Evans won the race, having gained the lead in a time-trial on the penultimate day. He became the first Australian to win the race, and at 34, the oldest post-war winner.
- August 20 – September 11: 2011 Vuelta a España
  - Spanish Juan José Cobo claimed his first major title. British Chris Froome and Bradley Wiggins on the podium.
- September 19–25: 2011 UCI Road World Championships in Copenhagen, Denmark
  - Mark Cavendish became the first British male since Tom Simpson to win the road race title

== Rowing ==
- August 28 to September 4 – 2011 World Rowing Championships will be held at Lake Bled, Bled, Slovenia.

== Rugby league ==
- 2011's Golden Boot for world's best player was awarded to Australian half back Johnathan Thurston.
- February 13; NRL All Stars Game
- February 23; World Club Challenge
- May; City vs Country Origin
- May; Australia vs New Zealand ANZAC Test
- May 25 – 6 July: State of Origin
  - Queensland defeat New South Wales 2–1 for their sixth consecutive series win.
- June 10: International Origin Match at Headingley Rugby Stadium, Leeds
  - In the first of what is planned to be an annual affair, the Exiles, a team consisting of non-English Super League players, defeated England 16–12.
- August; Challenge Cup final
- March 11 to October 2; National Rugby League season
  - Champions: Manly-Warringah Sea Eagles
  - Minor premiers: Melbourne Storm
- February 12 to October 2; 2011 Super League season
  - Champions: Leeds Rhinos
  - League Leaders: Warrington Wolves
- November; Rugby League Four Nations

== Rugby union ==
- February 4 – 19 March: Six Nations Championship
  - Winner: England, 26th title.
- May 20: Amlin Challenge Cup final at Cardiff City Stadium, Cardiff
  - (England) Harlequins claimed the title with a 19–18 win over (France) Stade Français, becoming the first team to win the Challenge Cup three times.
- May 21: Heineken Cup final at Millennium Stadium, Cardiff
  - (Ireland) Leinster won its second European title with a 33–22 win over (England) Northampton Saints.
- IRB Sevens World Series – New Zealand clinched the series title at the London Sevens on May 22, with the Edinburgh Sevens remaining to be played.
- May 24 – 5 June: 2011 IRB Junior World Rugby Trophy in Georgia
  - (gold) Samoa, (silver) Japan and (bronze) Georgia. This was the first title for Samoa.
- June 10–26: 2011 IRB Junior World Championship in Italy
  - (gold) New Zealand, (silver) England and (bronze) Australia. This was the fourth title for New Zealand.
- July 9: Super Rugby final at Suncorp Stadium, Brisbane
  - The (Australia) Reds claimed their first title in the competition's professional era with an 18–13 win over the (New Zealand) Crusaders.
- July 23 – 27 August: Tri Nations Series
  - Australia won its third title.
  - This was also the final edition of the Tri Nations under that name. With the entry of Argentina in 2012, the competition was renamed The Rugby Championship.
- September 9 – 23 October: 2011 Rugby World Cup in New Zealand
  - The tournament was won by New Zealand's All Blacks defeating France in the final by a score of 8–7. (gold) New Zealand, (silver) France and (bronze) Australia.

Domestic competitions

- (England) English Premiership – Final, May 28 at Twickenham: Leicester Tigers vs. Saracens
  - Saracens defeated Leicester Tigers 22–18 for their first-ever Premiership title.
- RFU Championship – Worcester Warriors. As the only side among the semifinalists that met the requirements for promotion, they replaced Leeds Carnegie in the 2011–12 Premiership.
- Top 14 – Final, June 4 at Stade de France: Toulouse vs. Montpellier
  - Toulouse won 15–10 and lifted the Bouclier de Brennus for the 18th time.
- Rugby Pro D2 – Lyon won the championship and automatic promotion to the Top 14. Bordeaux Bègles won the promotion playoffs. The two clubs will replace La Rochelle and Bourgoin.
- (Ireland) (Italy) (Scotland) (Wales) Celtic League – Grand Final, May 28 in Limerick:
  - In an all-Irish affair, Munster won their third title against Leinster 19–9.
- (England) (Wales) LV Cup (Anglo-Welsh Cup) – Gloucester
- ITM Cup:
  - Premiership – Final, September 3 in Hamilton: Waikato vs. Canterbury
    - Canterbury won 12–3 for their fourth consecutive title in the Air New Zealand/ITM Cup and ninth in the history of New Zealand provincial rugby.
  - Championship: Final, September 4 in Palmerston North: Manawatu vs. Hawke's Bay
    - Hawke's Bay won 35–30 and will replace Southland in the 2012 ITM Cup Premiership.
- (South Africa) Currie Cup: Final, October 29 in Johannesburg: Golden Lions vs. Sharks
  - The Lions won 42–16 in the most one-sided Currie Cup final since 1980.

Other major events

- February 26: During the England–France match in the Six Nations, England's Jonny Wilkinson retakes the all-time lead for career Test points from New Zealand's Dan Carter.
- February 27: During the Scotland–Ireland match in the Six Nations, Ireland's Ronan O'Gara retakes the all-time lead for career points in the Championship from Wilkinson.
- March 19: During the Ireland–England Six Nations match, two Irish players reach major career milestones in the Championship:
  - Brian O'Driscoll takes over the all-time lead for career tries in the Championship with his 25th try, breaking the record of Scotland's Ian Smith that had lasted since 1933.
  - Ronan O'Gara makes his 56th appearance in the Championship, drawing level with countryman Mike Gibson for the Championship record.
- July 30: During New Zealand's Tri Nations opener at home to South Africa, Carter reclaims the all-time lead for career Test points from Wilkinson.

== Tennis ==
- 2011 Australian Open (January 17–30)
  - Men's final: Novak Djokovic defeats Andy Murray 6–4, 6–2, 6–3
  - Women's final: Kim Clijsters defeats Li Na 3–6, 6–3, 6–3
- 2011 French Open (May 17 – June 5)
  - Men's final: Rafael Nadal defeats Roger Federer 7–5, 7–6, 5–7, 6–1
  - Women's final: Li Na defeats Francesca Schiavone 6–4, 7–6^{(7–0)}
- 2011 Wimbledon Championships (June 20 – July 3)
  - Men's final: Novak Djokovic defeats Rafael Nadal 6–4, 6–1, 1–6, 6–3
  - Women's final: Petra Kvitová defeats Maria Sharapova 6–3, 6–4
- 2011 US Open (August 29 – September 12)
  - Men's final: Novak Djokovic defeats Rafael Nadal 6–2, 6–4, 6–7, 6–1
  - Women's final: Samantha Stosur defeats Serena Williams 6–2, 6–3
- 2011 WTA Tour Championships in Istanbul, Turkey. (October 24–30)
  - (Czech Republic) Petra Kvitová defeats (Belarus) Victoria Azarenka 7–5 4–6 6–3. 1st title
- 2011 Fed Cup (February – November)
  - Czech Republic won the Fed Cup for the sixth time beating Russia in Moscow 3–2.
- 2011 ATP World Tour Finals in London, United Kingdom. (November 20–27)
  - (Switzerland) Roger Federer defeats (France) Jo-Wilfried Tsonga 6–3, 6–7, 6–3. Sixth title.
- 2011 Davis Cup (March – December)
  - Spain defeats Argentina in Seville. 5th title.

== Volleyball ==
- Women's CEV Champions League 2010–11 November 23, 2010 – March 20, 2011. Final Four in Istanbul, Turkey
  - Champions (Turkey) VakıfBank Güneş TTelekom, (Azerbaijan) Rabita Baku, (Turkey) Fenerbahçe Acıbadem (Turkey) . MVP: Małgorzata Glinka (POL)
- Men's CEV Champions League 2010–11 November 17, 2010 – March 27, 2011. Final Four in Bolzano, Italy.
  - Champions (Italy) Trentino BetClic, (Russia) Zenit Kazan, (Russia) Dynamo Moscow. MVP: Osmany Juantorena (CUB)
- 2011 Montreux Volley Masters June 7–12 in Montreux, Switzerland
  - (gold) Japan, (silver) Cuba and (bronze) China. MVP: Hitomi Nakamichi (JPN)
- 2011 FIVB World League, May 27 – July 10, 2011, with the Final Eight in Gdańsk / Sopot, Poland
  - (gold) Russia, (silver) Brazil and (bronze) Poland. MVP: Maxim Mikhaylov (RUS)
- 2011 FIVB Women's Junior World Championship July 22–31 in Lima and Trujillo, Peru
  - (gold) Italy, (silver) Brazil and (bronze) China. MVP: Caterina Bosetti (ITA)
- 2011 FIVB Men's Junior World Championship August 1–10 in Rio de Janeiro and Niteròi, Brazil
  - (gold) Russia, (silver) Argentina and (bronze) Serbia. MVP: Leonid Shchadilov (RUS)
- 2011 FIVB World Grand Prix August 5–28, with the Final Eight in Macau, China
  - (gold) United States, (silver) Brazil and (bronze) Serbia. MVP: Destinee Hooker (USA)
- 2011 Men's European Volleyball Championship September 10–18 in Austria and Czech Republic
  - (gold) Serbia, (silver) Italy and (bronze) Poland. MVP: Ivan Miljkovic (SRB)
- 2011 Women's European Volleyball Championship September 22 – October 2 in Italy and Serbia
  - (gold) Serbia, (silver) Germany and (bronze) Turkey. MVP: Jovana Brakocevic (SRB)
- 2011 FIVB Women's World Cup November 4–18 in Japan
  - (gold) Italy, (silver) United States and (bronze) China. MVP: Carolina Costagrande (ITA)
- 2011 FIVB Men's World Cup November 20 – December 4 in Japan
  - (gold) Russia, (silver) Poland and (bronze) Brazil. MVP:Maxim Mikhaylov (RUS)

== See also ==
- International sports calendar 2011
