= 2011 Breeders' Cup =

Thoroughbred horse racing event

The 2011 Breeders' Cup World Championships was the 28th edition of thoroughbred racing's season ending premier event, and took place on November 4 and 5 at Churchill Downs in Louisville, Kentucky.

== Friday ==
The Breeders' Cup races were part of a 10 race program with post time at 2:00 pm EST for the first race. The post time of the first Breeders' Cup race was 4:12 pm EST. The attendance was 40,677.

Race Name	Sponsor	Distance/Surface	Restrictions	Purse	Winner
Juvenile Sprint	Sentient Jet	3/4 mile (1.2 km)	2 yrs	$500,000	Secret Circle
Juvenile Fillies Turf		1 mile (Turf)	2-year-old fillies	$1 million	Stephanie's Kitten
Filly & Mare Sprint	Sentient Jet	7/8 mile (1.4 km)	3 yrs+ fillies & mares	$1 million	Musical Romance
Juvenile Fillies Dirt	Grey Goose	1 1/16 miles (1.7 km)	2-year-old fillies	$2 million	My Miss Aurelia
Filly & Mare Turf	Emirates	1 3/8 miles (2.2 km) (Turf)	3 yrs+ fillies & mares	$2 million	Perfect Shirl
Ladies' Classic		1 1/8 miles (1.8 km)	3 yrs+ fillies & mares	$2 million	Royal Delta

== Saturday ==
The Breeders' Cup races were part of a 12 race program with post time at 12:05 pm EST for the first race. The post time of the first Breeders' Cup race was 1:20 pm EST. The attendance was 65,143.

Highlights of the day's card was the attempt by Goldikova to win a fourth consecutive Breeders' Cup Mile in her last race. She was defeated into third place by 64–1 long shot Court Vision. Joseph O'Brien, son of famed Irish trainer Aidan O'Brien, became the youngest jockey to win a Breeders' Cup race (St Nicholas Abbey) at 18 years, 5 months, surpassing Fernando Jara, who was 18 years, 10 months old when he won the 2006 Classic on Invasor.

Race Name	Sponsor	Distance/Surface	Restrictions	Purse	Winner
Marathon		1 3/4 miles (2.8 km)	3 yrs+	$500,000	Afleet Again
Juvenile Turf		1 mile (Turf)	2-year-old colts & geldings	$1 million	Wrote
Dirt Sprint	Sentient Jet	3/4 mile (1.2 km)	3 yrs+	$1,500,000	Amazombie
Turf Sprint		5/8 mile (1.0 km) (Turf)	3 yrs+	$1 million	Regally Ready
Dirt Mile		1 mile (one turn)	3 yrs+	$1 million	Caleb's Posse
Turf	Emirates	1 1/2 miles (2.4 km) (Turf)	3 yrs+	$3 million	St Nicholas Abbey
Juvenile Dirt	Grey Goose	1 1/16 miles (1.7 km)	2-year-old colts & geldings	$2 million	Hansen
Turf Mile	TVG Network	1 mile (Turf)	3 yrs+	$2 million	Court Vision
Classic		1 1/4 miles (2.0 km)	3 yrs+	$5 million	Drosselmeyer

== See also ==
- 2011 Kentucky Derby
