= Breeders' Cup Marathon top three finishers =

This is a listing of the horses that finished in either first, second, or third place and the number of starters in the Breeders' Cup Marathon, a race run on dirt on the first day of the Breeders' Cup World Thoroughbred Championships. It was an ungraded race for its first two editions in 2008 and 2009, became a Grade III race in 2010 and was upgraded to GII status for 2011. On April 25, 2014, the Breeders' Cup announced that the Marathon would be discontinued. The event in 2014 was renamed to the Las Vegas Marathon as an undercard Breeders' Cup stakes races. In 2015 the event was raced under the name The Marathon.

Year	Winner	Second	Third	Starters
2013	London Bridge	Blueskiesnrainbows	Worldly	10
2012	Calidoscopio	Grassy	Atigun	13
2011	Afleet Again	Birdrun	Giant Oak	11
2010	Eldaafer	Gabriel's Hill	A. U. Miner	12
2009	Man of Iron	Cloudy's Knight	Mastery	10
2008	Muhannak	Church Service	Big Booster	8

== See also ==
- Breeders' Cup World Thoroughbred Championships
