= Greenwood Cup Stakes =

- Class: Grade III
- Location: Parx Casino and Racing; Bensalem, Pennsylvania, United States
- Inaugurated: 2002 (as Greenwood Cup Handicap)
- Race type: Thoroughbred - Flat racing
- Website: Parx

Race information
- Distance: 1 1/2 miles
- Surface: Dirt
- Track: left-handed
- Qualification: Three-year-olds and older
- Weight: Base weights with allowances: Older: 126 lbs 3YOs: 123 lbs
- Purse: $200,000 (since 2011)

The Greenwood Cup Stakes is a Grade III American Thoroughbred horse race for three-year-olds and older, over a distance of one-and-one-half miles on the dirt held annually in September during the fall meeting at Parx Casino and Racing in Bensalem, Pennsylvania. The current purse is $200,000.

== History ==
The race is named for Greenwood Racing, Inc. who purchased Philadelphia Park in December 1990.

The inaugural running of the event was on 8 June 2002 under handicap conditions and held on the turf course as the Greenwood Cup Handicap. The event was won by multiple Grade I winner, eight-year-old Cetewayo, bred and owned by Dr. John A. Chandler. The horse finished strongly as the 1/2 odds-on favorite to win by a length in a time of 2:35.01. The following year the event was moved off the turf and raced on a sloppy dirt track. It was won by Golden Ticket, who led all the way, winning by ten-and-one-quarter lengths.

The event was not held between 2005 and 2007. When the event resumed, it was scheduled in mid-July and was held on the dirt track as a stakes allowance.

Previously a Listed race, the event was upgraded to Grade III status for 2012 by the American Graded Stakes Committee.

In 2013, Eldaafer, a former winner of the Grade III Breeders' Cup Marathon, won the event as an eight-year-old.

In 2020, Parx Racing cancelled their race meeting due to the COVID-19 pandemic in the United States.

== Records ==
Speed record

- 1 1/2 miles: 2:28.01 Redeemed (2012)

Margins

- 25 lengths – Next (2023)

Most wins

- 2 – Next (2023, 2024)

Most wins by a trainer

- 2 - Brendan P. Walsh (2014, 2016)
- 2 - Todd A. Pletcher (2017, 2018)
- 2 - William D. Cowans (2023, 2024)

Most wins by a jockey

- 4 - Paco Lopez (2015, 2018, 2021, 2022)

Most wins by an owner

- 2 - Michael A. Foster (2023, 2024)

== Winners ==
Year	Winner	Age	Jockey	Trainer	Owner	Distance	Time	Purse	Grade	Ref
2025	No Bien Ni Mal (BRZ)	4	Joel Rosario	Paulo H. Lobo	Duplo Ouro Stables	1 1/2 miles	2:31.23	$200,000	III	
2024	Next	6	Luan Machado	William D. Cowans	Michael A. Foster	1 1/2 miles	2:33.61	$200,000	III	
2023	Next	5	Luan Machado	William D. Cowans	Michael A. Foster	1 1/2 miles	2:33.28	$200,000	III	
2022	Ridin With Biden	4	Paco Lopez	Robert E. Reid Jr.	Cash Is King & LC Racing	1 1/2 miles	2:32.92	$200,000	III	
2021	Magic Michael	4	Frankie Pennington	Jamie Ness	Morris E. Kernan Jr., Yo Berbs & Jagger, Inc.	1 1/2 miles	2:32.01	$200,000	III	
2020	Race not held									
2019	Adventist	6	John Bisono	Uriah St. Lewis	Bleu Max Stable	1 1/2 miles	2:33.81	$200,000	III	
2018	You're to Blame	4	Paco Lopez	Todd A. Pletcher	Bortolazzo Stable	1 1/2 miles	2:32.40	$200,000	III	
2017	Madefromlucky	5	Javier Castellano	Todd A. Pletcher	Cheyenne Stables & Mac Nichol	1 1/2 miles	2:32.72	$200,000	III	
2016	Scuba	5	Kendrick Carmouche	Brendan P. Walsh	DARRS, Inc.	1 1/2 miles	2:32.76	$200,000	III	
2015	Neck 'n Neck	6	Paco Lopez	Ian R. Wilkes	Ted Mitzlaff	1 1/2 miles	2:33.64	$200,000	III	
2014	Cary Street	5	Miguel Mena	Brendan P. Walsh	JBL Thoroughbreds & Walsh Racing	1 1/2 miles	2:30.71	$200,000	III	
2013	Eldaafer	8	Ricardo Santana Jr.	Diane D. Morici	Jim Atwell & Kevin Jacobsen	1 1/2 miles	2:33.73	$200,000	III	
2012	Redeemed	4	Ramon A. Dominguez	Richard E. Dutrow Jr.	Jay Em Ess Stable	1 1/2 miles	2:28.01	$200,000	III	
2011	†Birdrun	5	Rajiv Maragh	William I. Mott	Preston Stables	1 1/2 miles	2:30.30	$200,000	Listed	
2010	A. U. Miner	5	Frankie Pennington	Clark Hanna	Don L. Benge	1 1/2 miles	2:29.97	$240,000	Listed	
2009	Alcomo (BRZ)	6	Willie Martinez	Eduardo Caramori	Abdul Rahman Al Jasmi	1 1/2 miles	2:31.88	$250,000	Listed	
2008	Evening Attire	10	Jose L. Espinoza	Patrick J. Kelly	Mary & Joseph Grant & Thomas J. Kelly	1 1/2 miles	2:29.90	$250,000	Listed	
2005–2007		Race not held								
2004	In Hand	4	Rafael Mojica Jr.	Philip J. Oliver	Shining Armor Stable & G. Watts Humphrey Jr.	1 1/2 miles	2:33.32	$100,000	Listed	
2003	Golden Ticket	5	Cesar DeAlba	Clifford W. Sise Jr.	Glenn Holsinger	1 1/2 miles	2:31.61	$100,000	Listed	Off turf
2002	Cetewayo	8	Clinton L. Potts	Michael W. Dickinson	Dr. John A. Chandler	1 1/2 miles	2:35.01	$100,000	Listed	

Legend:
Turf Dirt
Notes:
† In the 2011 running, A. U. Miner was first past the post and wagering was paid out as the winner, however the horse returned a positive swab for methylprednisolone and was disqualified from first place purse money. The redistributed winner's purse went to Birdrun, who finished second.

== See also ==
- List of American and Canadian Graded races
