= Secret Circle =

Secret Circle may refer to:

- The Secret Circle, a trilogy of novels by L.J. Smith
- The Secret Circle (TV series), based on the novels
- Secret Circle (horse), a Thoroughbred racehorse
