= Mobil (horse) =

Canadian-bred Thoroughbred racehorse

- Sire: Langfuhr
- Grandsire: Danzig
- Dam: Kinetagal
- Damsire: Naskra
- Sex: Stallion
- Foaled: 2000
- Country: Canada
- Colour: Bay
- Breeder: Gus Schickedanz
- Owner: Gus Schickedanz
- Trainer: Mike Keogh
- Record: 29: 12-9-1
- Earnings: $1,877,136

Major wins
- Cup and Saucer Stakes (2002); Simcoe Stakes (2002); Toronto Cup Handicap (2003); Plate Trial Stakes (2003); Queenston Stakes (2003); Ontario Derby (2003); Dominion Day Handicap (2004); Vigil Stakes (2004); Halton Stakes (2004, 2005)

Awards
- Canadian Champion Older Male Horse (2004)
- Last updated on July 5, 2005

Mobil (foaled 2000 in Ontario) is a retired Canadian Thoroughbred racehorse. At age two, he won the two top races for his age group, the Cup and Saucer Stakes and the Coronation Futurity Stakes. However, in the Futurity he dead heated with Arco's Gold for the win but was subsequently disqualified for interference and set back to second.

A top three-year-old, Mobil ran second to Canadian Triple Crown winner Wando (his half brother, both by Langfuhr), in the Queen's Plate. His performances in 2004 earned him the Sovereign Award as Canada's Champion Older Male Horse.

Mobil was retired after the 2005 racing season having won twelve of his twenty-nine starts and having earned $1.877 million. He was sent to stand at stud at historic Windfields Farm in Oshawa, Ontario.
