= Woodman (horse) =

American-bred Thoroughbred racehorse

- Sire: Mr. Prospector
- Grandsire: Raise A Native
- Dam: Playmate
- Damsire: Buckpasser
- Sex: Stallion
- Foaled: 1983
- Country: United States
- Colour: Chestnut
- Breeder: Warner L. Jones Jr. & Eward A. Cox Jr.
- Owner: Robert Sangster
- Trainer: Vincent O'Brien
- Record: 5: 3-0-1
- Earnings: US$32,011 (Equivalent)

Major wins
- Futurity Stakes (1985); Anglesey Stakes (1985)

Awards
- Champion 2-year-old colt in Ireland

Woodman (1983–2007) was an American-bred Thoroughbred racehorse who raced in Ireland but who is best known as a sire of a number of important racehorses.

A descendant of the great sire Nearco through both his dam, Playmate, and his Champion sire, Mr. Prospector, Woodman was a Champion 2-year-old colt in Ireland but was retired to stud duty after five races. Returned to the United States, he stood at Ashford Stud in Versailles, Kentucky. Among his offspring, Woodman sired:

- Hansel - winner of the 1991 Preakness and Belmont Stakes and American Champion Three-Year-Old Male Horse
- Hishi Akebono - the 1995 Sprinters Stakes winner
- Timber Country - the 1994 Breeders' Cup Juvenile and Preakness Stakes winner
- Bosra Sham - 1996 European Champion 3-Year-Old Filly whose Group One wins include the British Classic, the 1,000 Guineas, and the Champion Stakes
- Hector Protector - multiple stakes winner in France including three Group Ones at age two in 1990: Grand Critérium, Prix Morny, Prix de la Salamandre plus two more Group Ones at age three in 1991: Poule d'Essai des Poulains, Prix Jacques Le Marois
- Woodcarver - the 1999 Canadian Champion 3-Year-Old Colt and Queen's Plate winner
- Hawk Wing - top two-year-old of 2001 in the United Kingdom and Ireland

Woodman was the damsire of Wando, the 2003 Canadian Triple Crown champion, and of Kinsale King, winner of the 2010 Dubai Golden Shaheen.

At age twenty-four, Woodman was humanely euthanized due to the infirmities of old age on July 19, 2007.

== Pedigree ==
Pedigree of Woodman, chestnut colt, 1983
Sire Mr. Prospector	Raise a Native	Native Dancer	Polynesian
Sire Mr. Prospector	Raise a Native	Native Dancer	Geisha
Sire Mr. Prospector	Raise a Native	Raise You	Case Ace
Sire Mr. Prospector	Raise a Native	Raise You	Lady Glory
Sire Mr. Prospector	Gold Digger	Nashua	Nasrullah
Sire Mr. Prospector	Gold Digger	Nashua	Segula
Sire Mr. Prospector	Gold Digger	Sequence	Count Fleet
Sire Mr. Prospector	Gold Digger	Sequence	Miss Dogwood
Dam Playmate	Buckpasser	Tom Fool	Menow
Dam Playmate	Buckpasser	Tom Fool	Gaga
Dam Playmate	Buckpasser	Busanda	War Admiral
Dam Playmate	Buckpasser	Busanda	Businesslike
Dam Playmate	Intriguing	Swaps	Khaled
Dam Playmate	Intriguing	Swaps	Iron Reward
Dam Playmate	Intriguing	Glamour	Nasrullah
Dam Playmate	Intriguing	Glamour	Striking (family: 1-x)
