= D. Wayne Lukas =

American horse trainer (1935–2025)

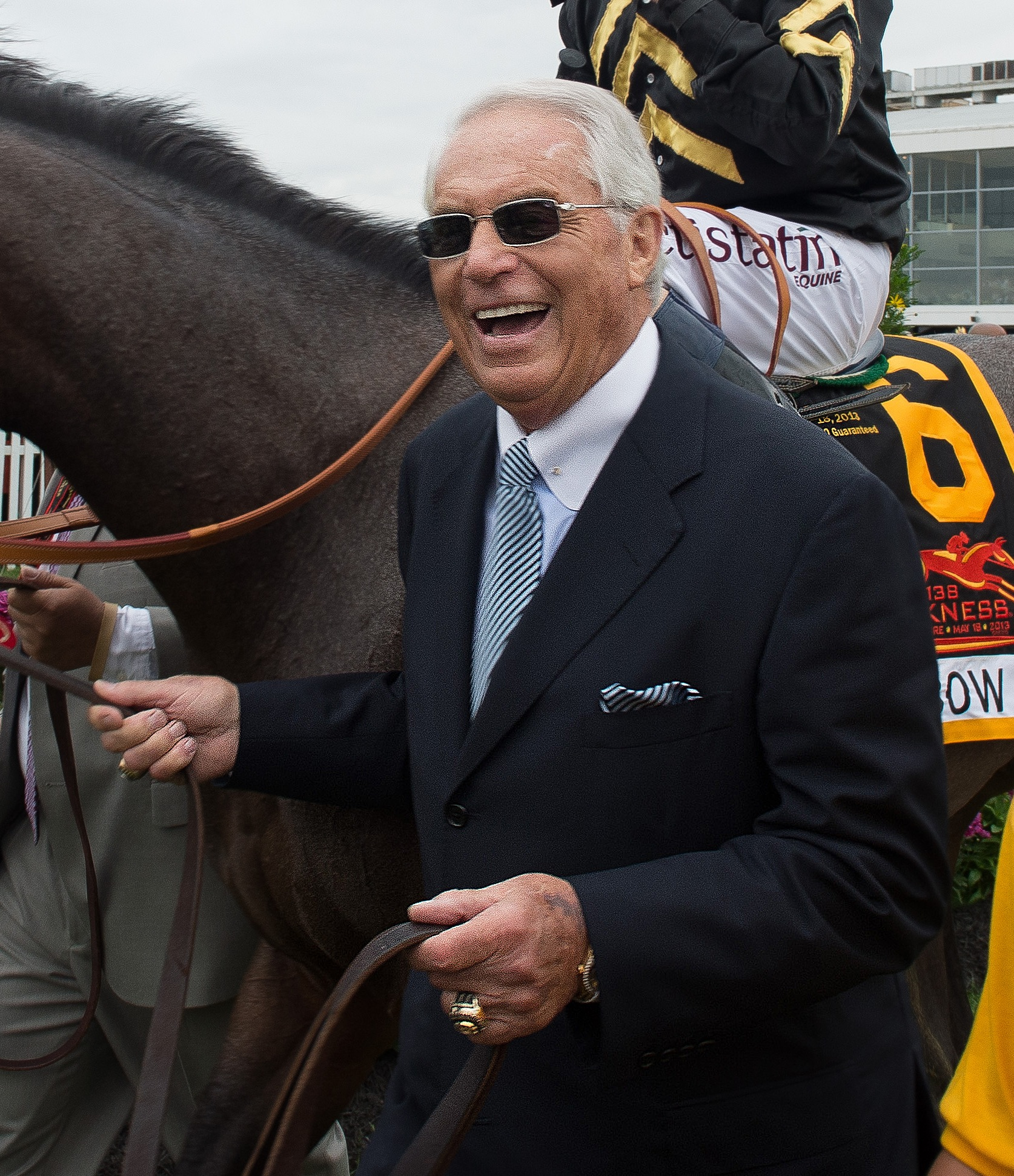
- Lukas in 2013

Personal information
- Full name: Darrell Wayne Lukas
- Born: September 2, 1935 Antigo, Wisconsin, U.S.
- Died: June 28, 2025 (aged 89) Louisville, Kentucky, U.S.

Horse racing career
- Sport: Horse racing
- Career wins: Quarter Horse racing: 739; Thoroughbred flat racing: 4,953

Major racing wins
- American Classics wins: Kentucky Derby (1988, 1995, 1996, 1999); Preakness Stakes (1980, 1985, 1994, 1995, 1999, 2013, 2024); Belmont Stakes (1994, 1995, 1996, 2000); Breeders' Cup wins: Breeders' Cup Juvenile Fillies (1985, 1988, 1994, 1999, 2005, 2014); Breeders' Cup Juvenile (1986, 1987, 1988, 1994, 1996); Breeders' Cup Juvenile Sprint (2012); Breeders' Cup Sprint (1988, 2002); Breeders' Cup Turf Mile (1989); Breeders' Cup Distaff (1985, 1986, 1987, 2000); Breeders' Cup Classic (1999) Grade 1 Stakes Wins: Acorn Stakes 1989, 1990, 1997; Alabama Stakes 1984, 1989; American Pharoah Stakes / FrontRunner Stakes / Norfolk Stakes 1981, 1986, 1989; Apple Blossom Handicap 1983, 1987, 2004; Arkansas Derby 1984, 1985; Arlington Million 1989, 1997; Arlington-Washington Futurity Stakes 1987; Arlington-Washington Lassie Stakes 1985; Ashland Stakes 1987, 1998; Ballerina Stakes 1990, 1997; Beldame Stakes 1984, 1985, 1986, 1991, 1995; Belmont Futurity Stakes 1997; Bernard Baruch Handicap 1989; Blue Grass Stakes 1987, 2000; Breeders' Futurity Stakes 2004; Carter Handicap 1988, 1989; Champagne Stakes 1994, 1997; Chandelier Stakes / Oak Leaf Stakes 1982, 1983, 1985, 1986, 1987, 1988, 1994, 1995, 1996; Charles Whittingham Memorial Handicap/Hollywood Turf Handicap 1990; Clark Handicap 2013; Coaching Club American Oaks 1987, 1989; Cowdin Stakes 1985, 1987; Del Mar Futurity 1984, 1987; Demoiselle Stakes 1988; Flamingo Stakes 1986, 1987; Florida Derby 1995, 1998; Flower Bowl Stakes 1989; Forego Stakes 2002; Fountain of Youth Stakes 2000; Frank J. De Francis Memorial Dash Stakes 1999; Frizette Stakes 1985, 1987, 1988, 1989, 1994, 1995, 1999; Gazelle Handicap 1988, 1995, 2004; Go For Wand Handicap/Maskette Stakes 1985, 1986, 1987, 2004; Gold Cup at Santa Anita Stakes / Hollywood Gold Cup Handicap 1990; Gulfstream Park Mile Stakes/Gulfstream Park Handicap 1989; Haskell Invitational Stakes 1995; Hollywood Derby 1980, 1996; Hopeful Stakes 1990, 1991, 1995, 1999, 2000, 2009, 2013, 2017; Jim Dandy Stakes 2001; Kentucky Oaks 1982, 1984, 1989, 1990, 2022; La Brea Stakes 2000; La Cañada Stakes 1986, 1987; Ladies Handicap 1986; Las Virgenes Stakes 1995, 1997, 2000; Los Alamitos Derby / Swaps Stakes 1986, 1999; Los Alamitos Futurity / Hollywood Futurity 1987, 1989, 1998; Matron Stakes 1983, 1984, 1987, 1988, 1989, 1995, 1996, 2005; Metropolitan Handicap 1988, 1990, 1996; Monmouth Cup Stakes/Meadowlands Cup Handicap 1991; Monmouth Oaks 1987; Mother Goose Stakes 1984, 1986, 1987, 1989, 1995, 2004; Oaklawn Handicap 1989; Ogden Phipps Stakes/Hempstead Handicap 1991, 1996; Philip H. Iselin Stakes 1986, 1987; Pimlico Special Handicap 1990, 1991; Ruffian Stakes 1985, 1986; San Felipe Stakes 1985; San Fernando Stakes 1988; San Juan Capistrano Stakes 1997; Santa Anita Derby 1980, 1982, 1983, 1988; Santa Anita Handicap 1991; Santa Anita Oaks / Santa Susana Stakes 1982, 1984, 1988, 1989, 1990, 1995, 1997, 2000; Santa Carlos Stakes 2002; Santa Margarita Stakes 1986, 1987; Santa Maria Stakes 1996; Santa Monica Stakes 1996; Secretariat Stakes 1996; Shuvee Stakes 1986, 1990, 1991; Spinaway Stakes 1984, 1985, 1987, 1989, 1992, 1995; Spinster Stakes 1987, 2004; Starlet Stakes / Hollywood Starlet Stakes 1983, 1990, 1994, 1995, 1996, 1997, 1999, 2014; Strub Stakes 1997; Suburban Stakes 1986; Summertime Oaks /Hollywood Oaks 1990; Super Derby 1996; Top Flight Handicap 1988; Travers Stakes 1991, 1995, 2013; Vosburgh Stakes 1994; Whitney Stakes 1986, 1990; Woodward Stakes 1982

Racing awards
- Eclipse Award for Outstanding Trainer (1985, 1986, 1987, 1994); U.S. Champion Trainer by wins (1987-1990); U.S. Leading stakes-winning trainer (1985-1992); U.S. Champion Trainer by earnings (1983-1992, 1994-1997); John W. Galbreath Equine Award (1998)

Honours
- United States' Racing Hall of Fame (1999); American Quarter Horse Hall of Fame (2007); Eclipse Award for Outstanding Trainer (1985, 1986, 1987, 1994); Eclipse Award of Merit; Lukas Classic Stakes; D. Wayne Lukas Stakes

Significant horses
- Trainer of 23 World Champion Quarter horses including Dash For Cash; Other Thoroughbred flat racing horses: Azeri, Blush With Pride, Cara Rafaela, Corporate Report, Criminal Type, Dance Floor, Dynaformer, Effervescing, Farma Way, Go And Go, Golden Attraction, Grand Slam, Honour and Glory, Landaluce, North Sider, River Memories, Serena's Song, Sharp Cat, Southern Halo, Spain, Star of Cozzene, Tamarisk, Terlingua, Thunder Gulch, Titletown Five, Will Take Charge, Winning Colors,
- Updated on June 22, 2025

Darrell Wayne Lukas (September 2, 1935 – June 28, 2025) was an American horse trainer and a U.S. Racing Hall of Fame inductee. He won 20 Breeders' Cup races, 15 Triple Crown races, received five Eclipse Awards for his accomplishments, and his horses won 25 year-end Eclipse Awards. Lukas was inducted into the American Quarter Horse Hall of Fame in 2007.

== Early life and education ==
Lukas was born on September 2, 1935, in Antigo, Wisconsin, where his parents had a farm. He grew up with an interest in horses. As an undergraduate at the University of Wisconsin–Madison, he was initiated into the Kappa Sigma fraternity. He graduated from the University of Wisconsin–Madison with a master's degree in education, then taught at Logan High School in La Crosse, Wisconsin, where he was a head basketball coach.

== Career ==
Lukas began training quarter horses in California in 1968 and after 10 years of achievement that saw him train 24 world champions, he switched to training thoroughbreds. His first win as a thoroughbred trainer was on October 20, 1977, at Santa Anita Park. The first trainer to earn more than $100 million in purse money, he was the year's top money winner 14 times. He earned purses of more than $300 million during his career.

Lukas first gained major attention in 1980 when he won the Preakness Stakes with Codex. His horses won the Kentucky Derby four times, the Preakness Stakes seven times and the Belmont Stakes four times. His horses won all three of the Classics in 1995 with Thunder Gulch (Kentucky Derby, Belmont Stakes) and Timber Country (Preakness), making him the first trainer to sweep the Triple Crown Classic races with two different horses in a season. In 2013, he surpassed Sunny Jim Fitzsimmons for the most Triple Crown race victories, with 14. In 2024, the 88-year-old Lukas broke Fitzsimmons' record as the oldest trainer to win a Triple Crown race when Seize the Grey won the 2024 Preakness Stakes; it was the fifteenth time he won a Triple Crown race and the seventh time he won the Preakness Stakes.

He won Breeders' Cup races a record 20 times. Fillies trained by Lukas won the Kentucky Oaks five times. Three of his horses—Lady's Secret in 1986, Criminal Type in 1990 and Charismatic in 1999—won the Eclipse Award for Horse of the Year. He had a total of 25 horses that won various Eclipse Awards. He won the Eclipse Award for Outstanding Trainer four times. In 1999, the same year his horse Charismatic came within two lengths of the Triple Crown, he was inducted into the National Museum of Racing and Hall of Fame. He was inducted into the American Quarter Horse Hall of Fame in 2007, becoming the first person to enter both the Thoroughbred and Quarter Horse Halls of Fame. In 2013, he was awarded the Eclipse Award of Merit for his accomplishments. In 1988, Lukas received the Golden Plate Award of the American Academy of Achievement presented by Awards Council member Gene Klein.

Lukas earned criticism for his training and racing methods and the resulting attrition rate of his horses.

In 2014, at age 78, in his acceptance speech for the 2013 Eclipse Award of Merit, he stated, "[when they start giving you awards ... they are trying to get you to retire. Well, you young trainers get ready because I'm not retiring. We're coming after you so you'd better get up a little more early in the morning from now on. We're coming after you with a vengeance."

Lukas's 4,953rd and final thoroughbred winner was Tour Player, who won at Churchill Downs on June 12, 2025.

== Personal life ==
Lukas married five times. He had one son, Jeff (1957–2016), with his first wife. Jeff worked for his father as an assistant trainer and was the elder Lukas's right-hand man until December 1993, when Lukas's Derby contender Tabasco Cat seriously injured Jeff in a shedrow accident at Santa Anita Park. The colt broke loose, Jeff tried to stop him by standing in front of him, and the horse slammed into him, throwing him into the air. Jeff landed on concrete and suffered a skull fracture that left him in a coma for several weeks. He suffered permanent brain damage and had changes in personality, vision loss, and damage to his memory. By spring of 1994, he had recovered enough to attempt a return to horse racing, but after a series of less-demanding jobs ending in 2003, it was clear that he could not work safely around racehorses. He also tried living and working near horse farms, but his disabilities were too severe for him to be safe around horses. He ultimately moved to Atoka, Oklahoma, in 2007 to work for David Burrage, who had been the accountant and general manager for Lukas Racing Stables. By that time, Burrage was a banker and owned the First Bank in Atoka, which employed Lukas. His father bought him a home there, and Jeff lived a quiet life until his death at age 58 in March 2016.

=== Illness and death ===
Lukas contracted COVID-19 in 2020 but recovered from the illness.

On June 22, 2025, Lukas's family and Churchill Downs announced that Lukas had health issues and would not return to training. Lukas was hospitalized for a severe MRSA infection and declined an aggressive treatment plan, instead choosing to return home for hospice care. His thoroughbreds were transferred to his assistant of over 20 years, Sebastian Nicholl, who remained as their trainer of record until the following month.

Lukas died at his home in Louisville, Kentucky, on June 28, 2025, at the age of 89.

== Thoroughbreds trained with major wins ==
Kentucky Derby

- Winning Colors (1988)
- Thunder Gulch (1995)
- Grindstone (1996)
- Charismatic (1999)

Preakness Stakes

- Codex (1980)
- Tank's Prospect (1985)
- Tabasco Cat (1994)
- Timber Country (1995)
- Charismatic (1999)
- Oxbow (2013)
- Seize the Grey (2024)

Belmont Stakes

- Tabasco Cat (1994)
- Thunder Gulch (1995)
- Editor's Note (1996)
- Commendable (2000)

Breeders' Cup Classic

- Cat Thief (1999)

Breeders' Cup Ladies' Classic

- Life's Magic (1985)
- Lady's Secret (1986)
- Sacahuista (1987)
- Spain (2000)

Breeders' Cup Mile

- Steinlen (1989)

Breeders' Cup Sprint

- Gulch (1988)
- Orientate (2002)

Breeders' Cup Juvenile

- Capote (1986)
- Success Express (1987)
- Is It True (1988)
- Timber Country (1994)
- Boston Harbor (1996)

Breeders' Cup Juvenile Fillies

- Twilight Ridge (1985)
- Open Mind (1988)
- Flanders (1994)
- Cash Run (1999)
- Folklore (2005)
- Take Charge Brandi (2014)

Breeders' Cup Juvenile Sprint

- Hightail (2012)
