= Martin Garcia (jockey) =

Mexican jockey

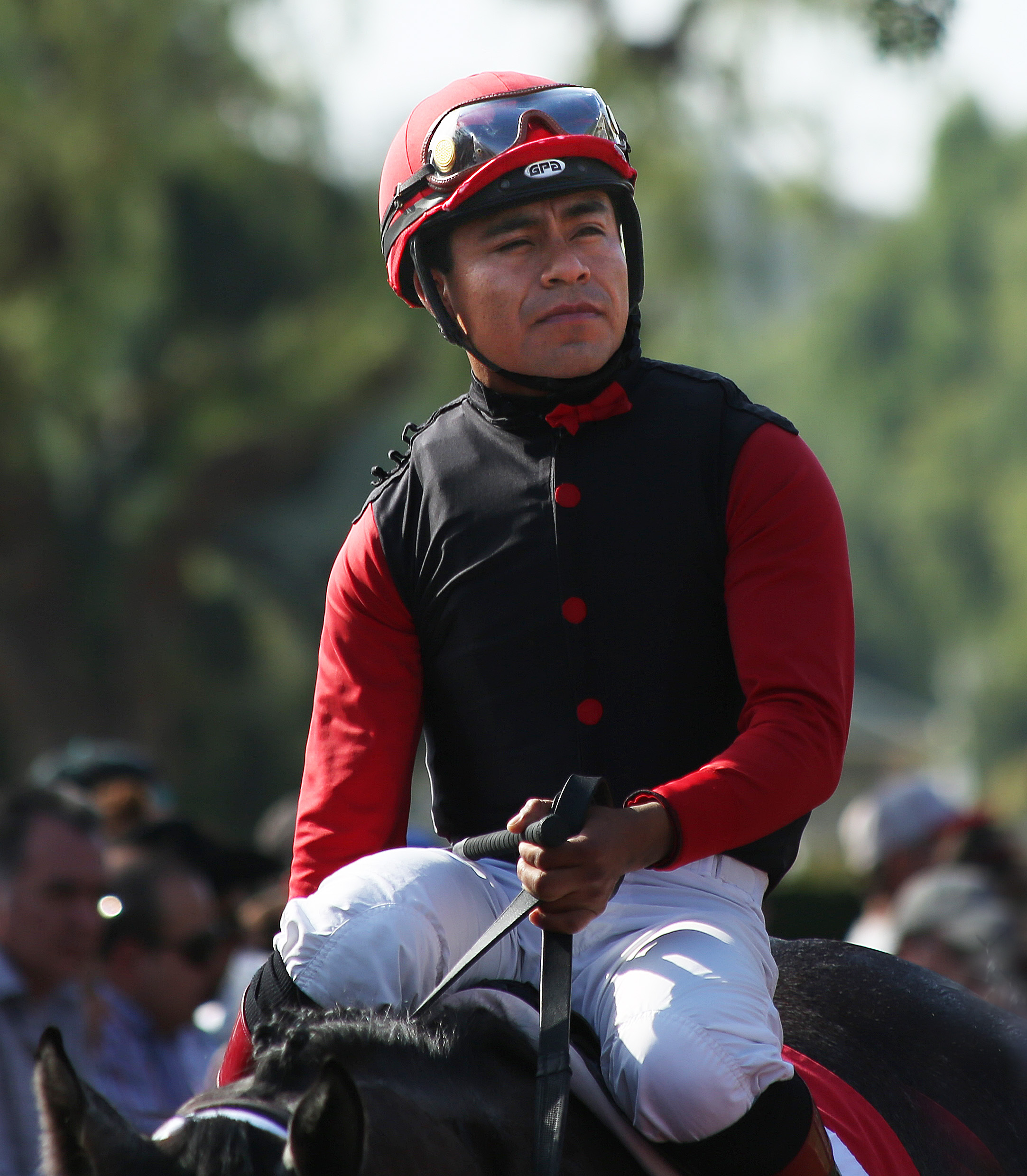
- Garcia in 2014

Personal information
- Born: October 23, 1984 (age 41) Veracruz, Mexico
- Occupation: Jockey

Horse racing career
- Sport: Horse racing
- Career wins: 1314 (ongoing) As of 16 May 2015

Major racing wins
- American Classic Race wins: Preakness Stakes (2010); Kentucky Oaks (2011); Breeders' Cup Classic (2014); Graded Stakes Wins; Morvich Handicap (2007); Senorita Stakes (2008); Vernon O. Underwood Stakes (2009); Lone Star Derby (2010); Palos Verdes Handicap (2010); Strub Stakes (2010); Southwest Stakes (2010); Acorn Stakes (2010); Hollywood Oaks (2010); Haskell Invitational (2010); Alysheba Stakes (2011); Haskell Invitational (2011); Pat O'Brien Stakes (2013); Pacific Classic Stakes (2013, 2017); Landaluce Stakes (2014); Santa Anita Derby (2015)

Significant horses
- Kinsale King, Lookin at Lucky, Conveyance, Bayern, Dortmund

Martin Garcia (born October 23, 1984 in Veracruz, Mexico) is a Mexican jockey in American Thoroughbred horse racing based in Southern California.

Garcia immigrated to the United States in 2003 and went to work at a delicatessen in Pleasanton, California. The deli's owner, Teri Terry, introduced him to Mark Hanna, a former jockey, who helped him get started in horse racing as a stablehand and exercise rider. Garcia spent six months galloping horses before beginning to ride in races at Golden Gate Fields.

On August 17, 2005, in his third career ride, Garcia rode Wild Daydreamer to victory at the Bay Meadows Fair.

In 2006, he outranked Hall of Fame rider Russell Baze for leading jockey at Golden Gate Fields. Baze had previously dominated that circuit and would reclaim his supremacy as soon at Garcia took his tack to Southern California. Garcia also won a riding title at Bay Meadows. In April 2006, Garcia relocated to southern California. At the Hollywood Park Racetrack Summer meet, he finished third behind Victor Espinoza and Patrick Valenzuela after riding 46 winning horses.

On May 15, 2010, Garcia rode the Bob Baffert trainee Lookin at Lucky to victory in the 135th running of the Preakness Stakes at Pimlico Race Course in Baltimore, Maryland. On August 1, 2010, he rode Lookin at Lucky to win the 43rd Haskell Invitational Handicap at Monmouth Park Racetrack in Oceanport, New Jersey.

On May 6, 2011, Garcia rode the Baffert-trained filly Plum Pretty to win the 137th Kentucky Oaks at Churchill Downs Racetrack in Kentucky. On July 31 of that year, Garcia rallied from last on another Baffert trainee, Coil, to win his second Haskell Invitational Handicap.

Other top mounts for Garcia include Somethingaboutlaura, Get Funky, Sweeter Still, Sierra Sweetie, Briecat, Z Humor, Dance With Gable and Strawberry Tart. Garcia also was the back up jockey for Game On Dude, three-time winner of the Santa Anita Handicap.

In 2014, he rode Bayern to a gate-to-wire victory in the Breeders' Cup Classic in a time under two minutes. That race has been subject of much debate due to a stewards' inquiry into the start of the race where Bayern moved to the inside at the start in front of favorite Shared Belief. Controversy erupted over the question of whether Garcia's mount should have been disqualified for interference in the first several feet.

== Year-end charts ==
Chart (2006–present)	Peak position
National Earnings List for Jockeys 2006	36
National Earnings List for Jockeys 2007	57
National Earnings List for Jockeys 2008	70
National Earnings List for Jockeys 2009	71
National Earnings List for Jockeys 2010	9
National Earnings List for Jockeys 2011	13
National Earnings List for Jockeys 2012	21
National Earnings List for Jockeys 2013	14
National Earnings List for Jockeys 2014	10
National Earnings List for Jockeys 2015	23

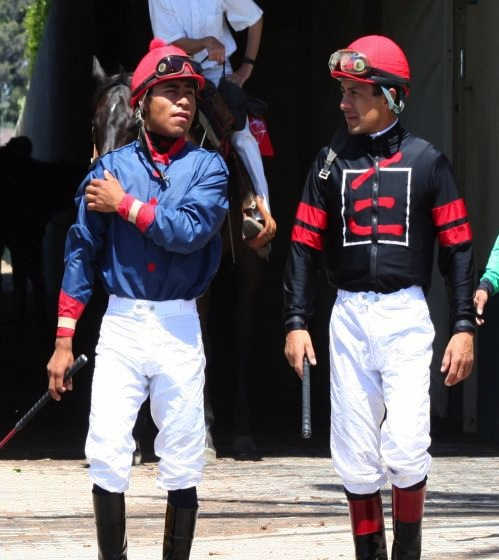
García with fellow jockey Victor Espinoza (left), at Hollywood Park racetrack in 2008
