= Queenston Stakes =

- Class: Restricted Stakes
- Location: Woodbine Racetrack; Toronto, Ontario, Canada
- Inaugurated: 1956
- Race type: Thoroughbred - Flat racing
- Website: web.archive.org/web/20100316214346/http://www.woodbineentertainment.com:80/qct/default.asp

Race information
- Distance: 7 furlongs
- Surface: Tapeta
- Track: left-handed
- Qualification: Three-year-olds, foaled in Ontario
- Weight: Assigned
- Purse: $150,000

The Queenston Stakes is a Canadian Thoroughbred horse race run annually at Woodbine Racetrack in Toronto, Ontario. Run in early May, the stakes race is open to three-year-old horses who were foaled in the Province of Ontario. Raced over a distance of seven furlongs on Polytrack synthetic dirt, it currently offers a purse of $150,000.

The Queenston Stakes was first run in 1956 at Fort Erie Racetrack in Fort Erie, Ontario as a 5 1/2 furlong sprint race. From 1976 through 1979 the race was hosted by Greenwood Raceway then in 1980 it was moved to Woodbine Racetrack. Since inception, it has been run at various distances:

- 5 furlongs : 1958, 1961
- 5.5 furlongs : 1956-1957, 1959
- 6 furlongs : 1960, 1962-1975
- 6.5 furlongs : 1976
- 7 furlongs : 1977–present

The race was run in two divisions in 1960, 1961, and 1976.

== Records ==
Speed record: (Through 1998, Woodbine times were recorded in fifths of a second. Since 1999 they are in hundredths of a second)

- 1:20.97 - Essence Hit Man (2010)

Most wins by a jockey:

- 4 - Robin Platts (1972, 1974, 1977, 1990)
- 4 - David Clark (1980, 2000, 2004, 2007)

Most wins by a trainer:

- 4 - Yonnie Starr (1960 (2), 1968, 1971)
- 4 - Gil Rowntree (1974, 1975, 1977, 1990)
- 4 - Robert P. Tiller (1989, 1998, 2001, 2004)

Most wins by an owner:

- 3 - Jean-Louis Lévesque (1968, 1971, 1983)
- 3 - Stafford Farms (1974, 1975, 1977)

== Winners ==
Year	Winner	Jockey	Trainer	Owner	Time
2010	Essence Hit Man	Chantal Sutherland	Audre Cappuccitti	Audre & Gordon Cappuccitti	1:20.97
2009	El Brujo	Patrick Husbands	Malcolm Pierce	Windways Farm	1:22.17
2008	Not Bourbon	Jono Jones	Roger Attfield	Charles E. Fipke	1:21.86
2007	Jiggs Coz	David Clark	Sid C. Attard	Jim Dandy Stable	1:24.42
2006	Atlas Shrugs	Corey Fraser	Reade Baker	C. Roberts & J. Pepper	1:24.12
2005	Verne's Baby	Emile Ramsammy	Sid C. Attard	G B Stable	1:23.40
2004	Twisted Wit	David Clark	Robert P. Tiller	Rolph A. Davis	1:23.38
2003	Mobil	Todd Kabel	Michael Keogh	Gus Schickedanz	1:24.26
2002	Shaws Creek	Jake Barton	John A. Ross	Jam Jar Racing	1:23.46
2001	Win City	Constant Montpellier	Robert P. Tiller	Frank DiGiulio, Sr. & Jr.	1:24.13
2000	Wake At Noon	David Clark	Abraham R. Katryan	Bruno Schickedanz	1:21.64
1999	Woodcarver	Mickey Walls	Mike Keogh	Gus Schickedanz	1:22.84
1998	Zap Happy	Todd Kabel	Robert P. Tiller	Laser Quest & Partners	1:22.80
1997	Randy Regent	Todd Kabel	Mark Frostad	Sam-Son Farm	1:23.40
1996	Victor Cooley	Emile Ramsammy	Mark Frostad	Windways Farm	1:23.40
1995	Tethra	Dave Penna	Josie Carroll	Eaton Hall Farm	1:21.40
1994	Parental Pressure	Dave Penna	Fred H. Loschke	Hammer Kopf/Corrente/partners	1:23.20
1993	How Should I Know	James McKnight	Kathy Patton-Casse	Kathy Patton-Casse	1:23.60
1992	San Romano	Mickey Walls	Phil England	Knob Hill Stable	1:24.40
1991	Bolulight	Don Seymour	Roger Attfield	Kinghaven Farms	1:22.40
1990	Spencer Gorge	Robin Platts	Gil Rowntree	F. H. Sherman	1:24.00
1989	Domasca Dan	Ray Sabourin	Robert P. Tiller	F. DiGiulio, Sr. & F. DiGiulio, Jr.	1:23.40
1988	Regal Intention	Jack Lauzon	James E. Day	Sam-Son Farm	1:23.20
1987	Afleet	Gary Stahlbaum	Phil England	Richard R. Kennedy	1:22.80
1986	Control Zone	Jeffrey Fell	Roger Attfield	Kinghaven Farms	1:24.40
1985	Regal Snow	Daniel David	W. F. Edmiston	W. F. Edmiston	1:24.00
1984	New Connection	Dave Penna	Trevor Swan	J. D. Cameron	1:23.20
1983	Feu D'Enfer	Yvon Turcotte	Jacques Dumas	Jean-Louis Lévesque	1:25.60
1982	Brave Regent	J. Paul Souter	Macdonald Benson	Windfields Farm	1:23.60
1981	Frost King	Lloyd Duffy	Bill Marko	Ted Smith & Bill Marko	1:23.20
1980	My Only Love	David Clark	Phil England	Mrs. M. Sutherland	1:23.80
1979	Lover's Answer	George HoSang	Brian Ottaway	Brodie Stable	1:25.00
1978	Maple Grove	Jim Walford	Alex Bankuti	E. & F. Racing Stable	1:25.40
1977	Sound Reason	Robin Platts	Gil Rowntree	Stafford Farms	1:25.00
1976	Hopeful Answer	Jeffrey Fell	Frank Merrill, Jr.	W. P. Gilbride	1:19.60
1976	Maitre de Danse	J. Long	George M. Carter	V. Martin Jr.	1:20.00
1975	Hagelin	Richard Grubb	Gil Rowntree	Stafford Farms	1:12.20
1974	Amber Herod	Robin Platts	Gil Rowntree	Stafford Farms	1:10.40
1973	Symmetric	Noel Turcotte	Carl F. Chapman	H. A. Grant	1:12.20
1972	Henry Tudor	Robin Platts	Lou Cavalaris, Jr.	Gardiner Farm	1:13.00
1971	Coco la Terreur	D. Thomas	Yonnie Starr	Jean-Louis Lévesque	1:12.00
1970	Dance To Market	Chris Rogers	E. Harbourne	V. Martin, Jr.	1:11.80
1969	Jumpin Joseph	Avelino Gomez	Warren Beasley	Warren Beasley	1:11.60
1968	Rouletabille	Richard Grubb	Yonnie Starr	Jean-Louis Lévesque	1:13.00
1967	Ette Rule	Jim Fitzsimmons	E. Harbourne	The Pheasant Stable	1:13.40
1966	Stevie B. Good	Eric Walsh	B. Pucccini	E. C. Pasquale	1:11.60
1965	Victorian Era	Wayne Harris	Lou Cavalaris, Jr.	Allen Case	1:11.40
1964	Peacock Pike	Avelino Gomez	J. MacKinnon	J. H. - J. C. MacKinnon	1:11.60
1963	Sea Service	W. A. Peake	Alfred I. Taylor	D. G. Ross	1:10.60
1962	Burnt Roman	John R. Adams	K. Nicholds	Keane & Waggoner	1:12.40
1961	Bourbon Blue	Cliff Potts	J. MacKinnon	J. & J. MacKinnon	1:08.60
1961	Crown Attorney	Hugo Dittfach	Arthur H. Warner	Lanson Farm	1:08.20
1960	Men at Play	Cliff Potts	Yonnie Starr	Larkin Maloney & Conn Smythe	1:12.40
1960	Royal Win	Cliff Potts	Yonnie Starr	Conn Smythe	1:11.80
1959	Anita's Son	Hugo Dittfach	Arthur H. Warner	Lanson Farm	1:05.20
1958	Silver Ship	Pat Remillard	Gordon Huntley	Gordon F. Hall	0:58.40
1957	Faultless Maid	Len Pong	W. Mooney	W. R. Wesley	1:06.00
1956	Dining Alone	David Stevenson	Frank Merrill, Jr.	M. L. Wilson	1:06.60
