= Imperial Gesture =

American thoroughbred racehorse

- Sire: Langfuhr
- Grandsire: Danzig
- Dam: Honor an Offer
- Damsire: Hoist the Flag
- Sex: Mare
- Foaled: 1999
- Country: USA
- Breeder: John R. Gaines Thoroughbreds LLC & De De McGehee
- Owner: Godolphin Racing
- Trainer: Saeed bin Suroor
- Record: 11:6-2-1
- Earnings: $1,419,140

Major wins
- Beldame Stakes (2002); Gazelle Stakes (2002)

Imperial Gesture (foaled February 27, 1999) is an American Thoroughbred racehorse who won the 2002 Beldame Stakes.

== Career ==
Imperial Gesture had her first race on July 29, 2001, at Delmar, coming in 2nd place. She captured her first win the following month on August 24, 2001, at Saratoga.

She came in 2nd in both September and October 2001 in the Oak Leaf Stakes and the Breeders' Cup Juvenile Fillies.

On September 7, 2002, she won the 2002 Gazelle Handicap and on October 5, 2002, she won the Beldame Stakes.

Her last race was on October 26, 2002, with a 3rd-place finish at the 2002 Breeders' Cup Distaff.

== Pedigree ==
Pedigree of Imperial Gesture (USA), 1999
| Sire Langfuhr (CAN) b. 1992 | Danzig (USA) b. 1977 | Northern Dancer | Nearctic |
| Sire Langfuhr (CAN) b. 1992 | Danzig (USA) b. 1977 | Northern Dancer | Natalma |
| Sire Langfuhr (CAN) b. 1992 | Danzig (USA) b. 1977 | Pas de Nom | Admiral's Voyage |
| Sire Langfuhr (CAN) b. 1992 | Danzig (USA) b. 1977 | Pas de Nom | Petitioner |
| Sire Langfuhr (CAN) b. 1992 | Sweet Briar Too (CAN) b. 1986 | Briartic | Nearctic |
| Sire Langfuhr (CAN) b. 1992 | Sweet Briar Too (CAN) b. 1986 | Briartic | Sweet Lady Briar |
| Sire Langfuhr (CAN) b. 1992 | Sweet Briar Too (CAN) b. 1986 | Prima Babu Gum | Gummo |
| Sire Langfuhr (CAN) b. 1992 | Sweet Briar Too (CAN) b. 1986 | Prima Babu Gum | Princess Babu |
| Dam Honor an Offer (USA) b. 1975 | Hoist the Flag (USA) b. 1968 | Tom Rolfe | Ribot |
| Dam Honor an Offer (USA) b. 1975 | Hoist the Flag (USA) b. 1968 | Tom Rolfe | Pocahontas |
| Dam Honor an Offer (USA) b. 1975 | Hoist the Flag (USA) b. 1968 | Wavy Navy | War Admiral |
| Dam Honor an Offer (USA) b. 1975 | Hoist the Flag (USA) b. 1968 | Wavy Navy | Trimophe |
| Dam Honor an Offer (USA) b. 1975 | Bridge o' Brick (USA) b. 1969 | Mr. Brick | Johns Joy |
| Dam Honor an Offer (USA) b. 1975 | Bridge o' Brick (USA) b. 1969 | Mr. Brick | Feronia |
| Dam Honor an Offer (USA) b. 1975 | Bridge o' Brick (USA) b. 1969 | Drop Shot | Correlations |
| Dam Honor an Offer (USA) b. 1975 | Bridge o' Brick (USA) b. 1969 | Drop Shot | My Alison |
