= Hightail (horse) =

American-bred Thoroughbred racehorse

- Sire: Mineshaft
- Grandsire: A.P. Indy
- Dam: Stormy Renee
- Damsire: Storm Cat
- Sex: Colt
- Foaled: 2010
- Country: United States
- Trainer: D. Wayne Lukas

Hightail is a retired thoroughbred racehorse. He is a son of 2003 Horse of the Year Mineshaft. His dam, Stormy Renee, is a daughter of the multiple Grade 1 winner Fleet Renee.

He is best known for winning the Breeders' Cup Juvenile Sprint in 2012. He had one additional start following the race and finished fourth to Goldencents in the Delta Jackpot Stakes in November 2012. He fractured his sesamoid in early 2013 and was retired to stud thereafter.

== Stud Record ==
=== Notable progeny ===
c = colt, f = filly, g = gelding

Foaled	Name	Sex	Major Wins
2015	Mongolian Groom	g	Awesome Again Stakes
2021	Gin Gin	f	Spinster Stakes

== Pedigree ==
Pedigree of Hightail (USA), dark brown colt, 2010
Sire Mineshaft (USA) 1999	A.P. Indy (USA); 1989	Seattle Slew (USA)†	Bold Reasoning (USA)†
Sire Mineshaft (USA) 1999	A.P. Indy (USA); 1989	Seattle Slew (USA)†	My Charmer (USA)†
Sire Mineshaft (USA) 1999	A.P. Indy (USA); 1989	Weekend Surprise (USA)	Secretariat (USA)†
Sire Mineshaft (USA) 1999	A.P. Indy (USA); 1989	Weekend Surprise (USA)	Lassie Dear (USA)
Sire Mineshaft (USA) 1999	Prospectors Delite (USA); 1989	Mr. Prospector (USA)	Raise a Native (USA)
Sire Mineshaft (USA) 1999	Prospectors Delite (USA); 1989	Mr. Prospector (USA)	Gold Digger (USA)
Sire Mineshaft (USA) 1999	Prospectors Delite (USA); 1989	Up The Flagpole (USA)	Hoist The Flag (USA)
Sire Mineshaft (USA) 1999	Prospectors Delite (USA); 1989	Up The Flagpole (USA)	The Garden Club (USA)
Dam Stormy Renee (USA) 2005	Storm Cat (USA); 1983	Storm Bird (CAN)	Northern Dancer (CAN)
Dam Stormy Renee (USA) 2005	Storm Cat (USA); 1983	Storm Bird (CAN)	South Ocean (CAN)
Dam Stormy Renee (USA) 2005	Storm Cat (USA); 1983	Terlingua (USA)	Secretariat (USA)†
Dam Stormy Renee (USA) 2005	Storm Cat (USA); 1983	Terlingua (USA)	Crimson Saint (USA)
Dam Stormy Renee (USA) 2005	Fleet Renee (USA); 1998	Seattle Slew (USA)†	Bold Reasoning (USA)†
Dam Stormy Renee (USA) 2005	Fleet Renee (USA); 1998	Seattle Slew (USA)†	My Charmer (USA)†
Dam Stormy Renee (USA) 2005	Fleet Renee (USA); 1998	Darien Miss (USA)	Mr. Leader (USA)
Dam Stormy Renee (USA) 2005	Fleet Renee (USA); 1998	Darien Miss (USA)	Gronas (USA)

† indicates inbreeding
