= Vernon O. Underwood Stakes =

Midnight Lute Stakes
- Class: Grade III
- Location: Hollywood Park Racetrack; Inglewood, California, United States
- Inaugurated: 1981
- Race type: Thoroughbred – flat racing
- Website: www.hollywoodpark.com

Race information
- Distance: Six and a half-furlong sprint
- Surface: Cushion Track synthetic dirt
- Track: left-handed
- Qualification: Three-years-old and up
- Weight: Assigned
- Purse: $100,000

The Vernon O. Underwood Stakes is an American Thoroughbred horse race held annually at Hollywood Park Racetrack in Inglewood, California. Raced in late November, the Grade III event is open to horses age three and older. It is contested on Cushion Track synthetic dirt at a distance of six furlongs.

Inaugurated as the National Sprint Championship Stakes, in 1990 the name was changed to honor Vernon O. Underwood (1907–1990), a California businessman. After Hollywood Park closed, the race is run as the Midnight Lute Stakes at Santa Anita Park.

In 2001, H. Eugene Reed's eight-year-old gelding Men's Exclusive became the first back-to-back winner of the race and its oldest winner.

The race was run in two divisions in 1981, 1982, 1984,1986, and in 2016

== Records ==
Speed record:

- 1:07.79 - Sailors Sunset (2006) (new track record on Cushion Track)

Most wins:

- 2 - Men's Exclusive (2000, 2001)

Most wins by a trainer:

- 3 - John W. Sadler (1989, 1990, 2010)

== Winners since 1989 ==
Year	Winner	Age	Jockey	Trainer	Owner	Time
2017	Silent Bird	5	Kent Desormeax	Mark Glatt	Norman Stables, LLC	1:09.39
2016	Solid Wager, ST Joe Bay (Dead Heat)	5,4	Kent Desormeax, Victor Esponoza	Peter Miller	Barber, Gary and Cecil and Stanford Stable, Al Tamira Racing Stable and David A. Bernsen	1:15.03
2016	San Onofre	6	Alex Solis	Karen Headley	Matson Racing	1:14.82
2014	Distinctiv Passion	4	Mike E Smith	Jeffrey L. Bonde	Peter Redekop B. C., Ltd.	1:14.55
2013	Majestic Stride	4	Edwin Maldonado	Jeffrey L. Bonde	Brown/Klein/Lebherz	1:08.87
2012	Smiling Tiger	5	Rafael Bejarano	Jeffrey L. Bonde	Alan Klein/Philip Lebherz	1:11.24
2011	Pacific Ocean	4	Joel Rosario	Mike Mitchell	JMJ Racing Stable	1:08.48
2010	Cost of Freedom	7	Joe Talamo	John W. Sadler	Gary & Cecil Barber	1:08.46
2009	Kinsale King	4	Martin Garcia	Carl O'Callaghan	Patrick Sheehy	1:09.67
2008	Johnny Eves	4	Garrett Gomez	Jay M. Robbins	Sharon Hilliard	1:07.90
2007	Bushwacker	5	Joseph Talamo	William L. Currin	Currin & Alvin Eisman	1:08.47
2006	Sailors Sunset	3	Jon Court	Marcelo Polanco	Everest stables	1:07.79
2005	Bordonaro	4	Pat Valenzuela	William B. Spawr	F. Carrillo & D. Casse	1:08.11
2004	Taste of Paradise	5	Jose Valdivia, Jr.	Gary Mandella	David Bloom	1:08.04
2003	Watchem Smokey	3	Julie Krone	Robert J. Frankel	Edmund A. Gann	1:08.93
2002	Debonair Joe	3	Julie Krone	Juan Pablo Silva	Lynne H. Ristad	1:09:17
2001	Men's Exclusive	8	Laffit Pincay, Jr.	Wesley A. Ward	H. Eugene Reed	1:09.04
2000	Men's Exclusive	7	Laffit Pincay, Jr.	Wesley A. Ward	H. Eugene Reed	1:09.02
1999	Five Star Day	3	Alex Solis	C. Beau Greely	Columbine Stable	1:09.91
1998	Love That Jazz	4	Kent Desormeaux	Neil Drysdale	Irving & Marge Cowan	1:08.79
1997	Tower Full	5	Corey Nakatani	Craig Dollase	Moon S. Han	1:08.17
1996	Paying Dues	4	Pat Day	Clifford Sise, Jr.	Ballantyne, Owen & Welty	1:08.24
1995	Powis Castle	4	Gary Stevens	Rodney Rash	Vistas Stables	1:08.40
1994	Wekiva Springs	3	Kent Desormeaux	Robert Hess, Jr.	Dizney & English	1:08.37
1993	Meafara	4	Gary Stevens	Gary F. Jones	Frank Muench	1:10.01
1992	Gundaghia	5	Gary Stevens	Bob Baffert	Goodman & Kieckhefer	1:09.33
1991	Individualist	4	Kent Desormeaux	David Hofmans	Golden Eagle Farm	1:08.86
1990	Frost Free	5	Chris McCarron	John W. Sadler	Triple Dot Dash Stable & Vandervoort	1:08.20
1989	Olympic Prospect	5	Alex Solis	John W. Sadler	Alsdorf, Opas & Sinatra	1:08.80

== Earlier winners ==
- 1988 - Gallant Sailor
- 1987 - Hilco Scamper
- 1986 - Bedside Promise
- 1986 - Nasib
- 1985 - Pancho Villa
- 1984 - Fifty Six In a Row
- 1984 - Lovlier Linda
- 1983 - Fighting Fit
- 1982 - Mad Key
- 1982 - Unpredictable
- 1981 - Shanekite
- 1981 - Smokite
