= Woodcarver (horse) =

Thoroughbred racehorse

- Sire: Woodman
- Grandsire: Mr. Prospector
- Dam: Sharpening Up
- Damsire: Sharpen Up
- Sex: Stallion
- Foaled: 1996
- Country: Canada
- Colour: Gray
- Breeder: Gustav Schickedanz
- Owner: Gustav Schickedanz
- Trainer: Michael Keogh
- Record: 9: 3-2-1
- Earnings: $455,126

Major wins
- Queenston Stakes (1999); Canadian Triple Crown series: Queen's Plate (1999)

Honours
- Canadian Champion 3-Year-Old Colt (1999)
- Last updated on September 1, 2007

Woodcarver (April 9, 1996 - September 10, 1999) was a Canadian Thoroughbred racehorse who in 1999 won Canada's most important race, the Queen's Plate, and was voted the Sovereign Award as that year's Canadian Champion 3-Year-Old Colt.

Bred by Gus Schickedanz at his farm near Nobleton, Ontario, Woodcarver was raced by his owner. His sire was Woodman, a Champion 2-year-old colt in Ireland who was a son of the influential American Champion sire, Mr. Prospector. Woodman also sired Preakness and Belmont Stakes winner Hansel as well as Breeders' Cup Juvenile and Preakness Stakes winner, Timber Country.

Trained and ridden by future Hall of Fame inductees, Woodcarver was race conditioned by Michael Keogh and had Mickey Walls aboard for his wins in the Queenston Stakes and the Queen's Plate.

On September 10, 1999, Woodcarver had to be humanely euthanized after taking a misstep during a morning workout which resulted in a badly broken leg.

== Pedigree ==
Pedigree of Woodcarver, gray colt, 1996
| Sire Woodman | Mr. Prospector | Raise a Native | Native Dancer |
| Sire Woodman | Mr. Prospector | Raise a Native | Raise You |
| Sire Woodman | Mr. Prospector | Gold Digger | Nashua |
| Sire Woodman | Mr. Prospector | Gold Digger | Sequence |
| Sire Woodman | Playmate | Buckpasser | Tom Fool |
| Sire Woodman | Playmate | Buckpasser | Busanda |
| Sire Woodman | Playmate | Intriguing | Swaps |
| Sire Woodman | Playmate | Intriguing | Glamour |
| Dam Sharpening Up | Sharpen Up | Atan | Native Dancer |
| Dam Sharpening Up | Sharpen Up | Atan | Mixed Marriage |
| Dam Sharpening Up | Sharpen Up | Rocchetta | Rockefella |
| Dam Sharpening Up | Sharpen Up | Rocchetta | Chambiges |
| Dam Sharpening Up | Twisp | Dancer's Image | Native Dancer |
| Dam Sharpening Up | Twisp | Dancer's Image | Noor's Image |
| Dam Sharpening Up | Twisp | Junonia | Sun Again |
| Dam Sharpening Up | Twisp | Junonia | Pavonia (family: 1-h) |
