= Langfuhr (horse) =

Canadian-bred Thoroughbred racehorse (1992–2023)

- Sire: Danzig
- Grandsire: Northern Dancer
- Dam: Sweet Briar Too
- Damsire: Briartic
- Sex: Stallion
- Foaled: 1992
- Died: October 2023 (aged 31); Versailles, Kentucky, U.S.
- Country: Canada
- Colour: Bay
- Breeder: Gus Schickedanz
- Owner: Gus Schickedanz
- Trainer: Michael Keogh
- Record: 23: 9-7-1
- Earnings: US$698,574

Major wins
- Forego Handicap (1996); Vosburgh Stakes (1996); Carter Handicap (1997); Metropolitan Handicap (1997)

Awards
- Canadian Champion Sprint Horse (1996)

Honours
- Canadian Horse Racing Hall of Fame (2004)

Langfuhr (1992 – October 2023) was a Canadian Hall of Fame Thoroughbred racehorse.

== Background ==
Owned and bred by noted German-born Canadian horseman Gus Schickedanz, he was named for Langfuhr the former German name for one of the boroughs of the Northern Polish city of Danzig. Langfuhr's sire Danzig was named after that city.

== Racing career ==
Langfuhr raced in Canada and the United States where he won three Grade 1 races. However, he is better known as the sire of a number of accomplished racehorses.

In 1996, Langfuhr's wins included the American Grade II Forego Handicap at Saratoga Race Course and the Grade I Vosburgh Stakes at Belmont Park. His performances that year earned him Canadian Champion Sprint Horse honors.

After winning the 1997 Carter Handicap at Aqueduct Racetrack in April and May's Metropolitan Handicap at Belmont Park, an injury ended Langfuhr's racing career and he was retired to stud.

== Stud career ==
Retired to stud duty at Lane's End Farm in Versailles, Kentucky, Langfuhr was the 2005 leading sire in North America by number of winners and as of 8 September 2007 had sired 49 stakes winners, including:

- Wando — 2003 Canadian Triple Crown Champion and Canadian Horse of the Year
- Mobil — 2004 Canadian Champion Older Male Horse
- Kimchi — 2006 Canadian Champion Three-Year-Old Filly
- Imperial Gesture — 2002 winner of the Grade 1 Beldame Stakes and Gazelle Handicap
- Lawyer Ron — won 2006 Arkansas Derby, 2007 Whitney Handicap and Woodward Stakes; 2007 Eclipse Champion Older Male.
- Jambalaya — winner of the 2007 Grade I Gulfstream Park Breeders' Cup Turf Stakes and the Arlington Million.
- Apollo Kentucky — 2016 winner of the Grade 1 Tokyo Daishōten

== Death ==
Langfuhr died at Lane's End Farm in October 2023, at the age of 31.
