= Eldaafer =

American-bred Thoroughbred racehorse (2005–2026)

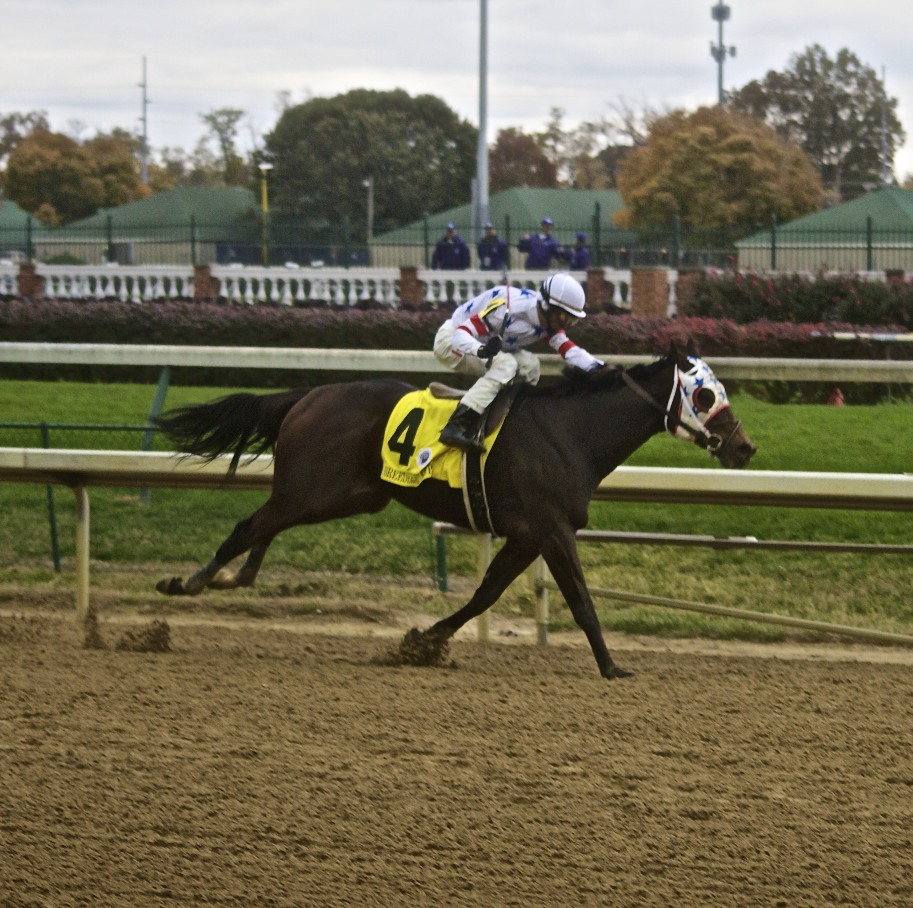
- Eldaafer comes down the stretch to win the Breeders Cup Marathon, 2010
- Sire: A.P. Indy
- Grandsire: Seattle Slew
- Dam: Habibti
- Damsire: Tabasco Cat
- Sex: gelding
- Foaled: March 13, 2005
- Died: January 22, 2026 (aged 20)
- Country: United States
- Colour: Dark bay or brown
- Breeder: Shadwell Farm
- Owner: Alghuwayriyah Stable
- Trainer: Diane Alvarado
- Record: 46: 13–3–7
- Earnings: $1,031,835

Major wins
- Brooklyn Handicap (2009); Fall Championship Stakes (2010); Breeders' Cup Marathon (2010); Greenwood Cup Stakes (2013)

Eldaafer (March 13, 2005 – January 22, 2026) was an American-bred racehorse best known for his wins in the Fall Championship Stakes, Breeders' Cup Marathon, Brooklyn Handicap, and Greenwood Cup.

== Background ==
Eldaafer was a bay gelding with an irregular star but had no white leg markings. He was sired by A.P. Indy, who won the Belmont Stakes and the Breeders Cup Classic. He had also sired other greats such as, Blue Grass Stakes winner Pulpit, Preakness Stakes winner Bernardini and Belmont Stakes winner Rags to Riches, his grandsire is Triple Crown winner Seattle Slew. His dam, Habibti, is a dual grade 1 winner. Winning the Del Mar Debutante, and Starlet Stakes.

== Career ==
=== 3-year-old season ===
As a 3-year old Eldaafer did not run in any stakes races but did run 4 times overall. His first race was Maiden Speicial Weight at Keenland. At the start Eldaafer broke slowly and was last. For the rest of the race almost everyone left him in the dust. At the wire he would be tenth out 11 horses in the race and Finnish over 57 lengths off the leader.

In his second start he went to Belmont Park, there he ran against a much smaller field of five. At the start he went to the lead. By the first quarter of a mile he had taken the lead and set the pace. For the rest of the race all Eldaafer did was widen his lead from half a length at the quarter pole, to 3 lengths at the wire.

For his next two races he ran in allowances. In the first one he started third and then dropped back to fifth and sixth during the first three quarters of a mile. By the end of the race only it would be a two horse race and Eldaafer would be a distant third. In the second race, he started sixth. But he dropped back to tenth and stayed far behind. He finally ended up ninth, 15 lengths behind the winner.

=== 4-year-old season ===
As a 4-year old Eldaafer had his first four starts in allowance/claiming races. His first of the four was a claiming race. Starting the race Eldaafer had the lead and kept it for most of the race. Soon he would be past by another horse. However Eldaafer got back his lead and went on the win by seven and a half lengths After three more races and two more wins. He made his stakes debut in the Nasty and Bold Stakes. In the race he started last and stayed there for the first half a mile and then for the rest of the race tried moving up. In the end he only got third and was seven and a half lengths behind the winner. He then made his graded stakes debut in the Brooklyn Handicap. in and won that year's Brooklyn Handicap, a Grade 2 race. At the start he was back in sixth and stayed close behind by half a mile. By the time the first mile was done he was a whopping ten lengths back. However just a quarter of a mile later he made up six lengths. By the far turn he was closing late and got up by just a nose. It would the last race Eldaafer won that year. He had trouble in later starts such as the Greenwood Cup and the Breeders' Cup Marathon.

=== 5-year-old season ===
At the beginning of his 5-year old season he had three allowance wins and two defeats in the Brooklyn Handicap, and the Suburban Handicap. Later in the season, he was entered into the final running of the "Fall Championship Stakes" on Patriot Day. Originally he was going to be scratched due to anxiety but later calmed down due to the presence of a goat named Google, and ultimately went through to run in the race. which was a "win and you're in" ticket to the Breeders Cup Marathon. At the beginning, he was third only two lengths behind the leader. He stayed two lengths behind but fell back to fourth, soon he would move closer and back in third. Soon, he would take the lead and opened up to win by half a length.

Next was the third running of the Breeders' Cup Marathon, he faced tougher competition such as G1 winner in Prince Will I am, and future Clark and Donn Handicap winner Giant Oak. Eldaafer started out okay in fourth place. For almost all of the race he bided his time staying fourth until towards the end of the race when he moved up to second. After that he took over the lead and opened up the lead to one and three-quarter lengths and finished the race in a time of 2:59.62. setting a new track record at Churchill Downs for the mile and three quarters.

=== 6-year-old season ===
As a 6-year old, Eldaafer did not win a single stakes race. In his first two starts he was way off the board. Finishing eighth and sixth respectively in the Donn Handicap and the Pan American Stakes. His next start was a huge down grade to what he had been running up against in 2011. It was an allowance in Atlantic City. At the start he fourth but quickly dropped back to fifth. He was seven lengths behind the leader by the first quarter of a mile. By half a mile he had only made up three quarters of length, by three quarters of a mile he was only three lengths behind and had moved up to fourth. Then by the far turn he had gotten a slight lead, for the remainder of the race Eldaafer opened up to win by four and a half lengths.

For the third time in his career, Eldaafer would be trying the Brooklyn Handicap. He started second but fell back to fourth and stayed many lengths behind the leaders before hitting the wire six and a half lengths behind. After an unsuccessful turf attempt in the United Nations Stakes he went to an allowance. Although he started second he quickly dropped down to fourth by the first quarter of a mile but kept dropping back to fifth and stayed. Then at the far turn he showed his turn of foot and got up to second only one and a half lengths behind, still in the final quarter of a mile he shrank the leaders lead until Eldaafer took the lead and won by half a length.

Next he ran in the DTHA Governors Day Stakes, starting fourth and then dropping back to fifth and last. following that he spent the rest of the race catching up as he kept moving up the placings but it was too late. He would be second five and a half lengths behind the winner. It would be the last time Eldaafer placed that year as he would be sixth in the breeders cup marathon and finally would end the year with an underwhelming fifth in the Native Diver Handicap.

=== 7-year-old season ===
As a 7-year old Eldaafer had trouble winning races. In his seasonal debut was the Turf Paradise Handicap. He had a slow beginning after starting sixth and last. Soon he would stay behind for the entirety of the race never posing as a concern for any of the competitors. In the end Eldaafer only was able to get fourth. His next start was the Tokyo City Cup Stakes, Like before he started out sixth. The difference was that he was running in a bigger field. Just like before though he would be fourth but it was by a big 17 1/2 lengths behind the winner.

After that Eldaafer next start would be another attempt at the Brooklyn Handicap. Yet again he started sixth and again stayed behind. But at the far turn he challenged the leader Redeemed and tried to take over the lead and win his second Brooklyn Handicap. Unfortunately Redeemed fought back and opened up a two and three quarter length win. Eldaafer would hang on to second. Later he would run twice more, first was the United Nations. At the start he was a tough third for most of the race. Unfortunately, he fell back and finished seventh and last, he was 11 1/2 lengths behind the winner. His next start was in the Philip H. Iselin Stakes. Surprisingly he went to the lead at the beginning of the race, however, this was short lived as he fell back to fifth and most of what was left of the race he stayed there.

Next would be the Carl Hanford Memorial, after starting third he quickly moved up to second. He started only a length behind but then dropped two lengths back. Soon he moved up and at the far turn took over the lead at the far turn by one and a half lengths. At the finish he doubled his margin to three lengths at the wire. Next would be Hawthorne Gold Cup, Surprisingly he stayed near the front for all of the race. He stayed head and head with the leader Alternation, soon he would take the lead. By the far turn it was a three horse race and just at the wire Eldaafer fell back and was third, just one and three-quarter lengths behind. Finally he would be back to run in the Breeders Cup Marathon. At the start he was ninth but quickly moved up to eighth. He then moved up to seventh seven and a half lengths behind the leader. He then stayed seventh for the rest of the race finishing 13 3/4 lengths behind the winner.

=== 8-year-old season ===
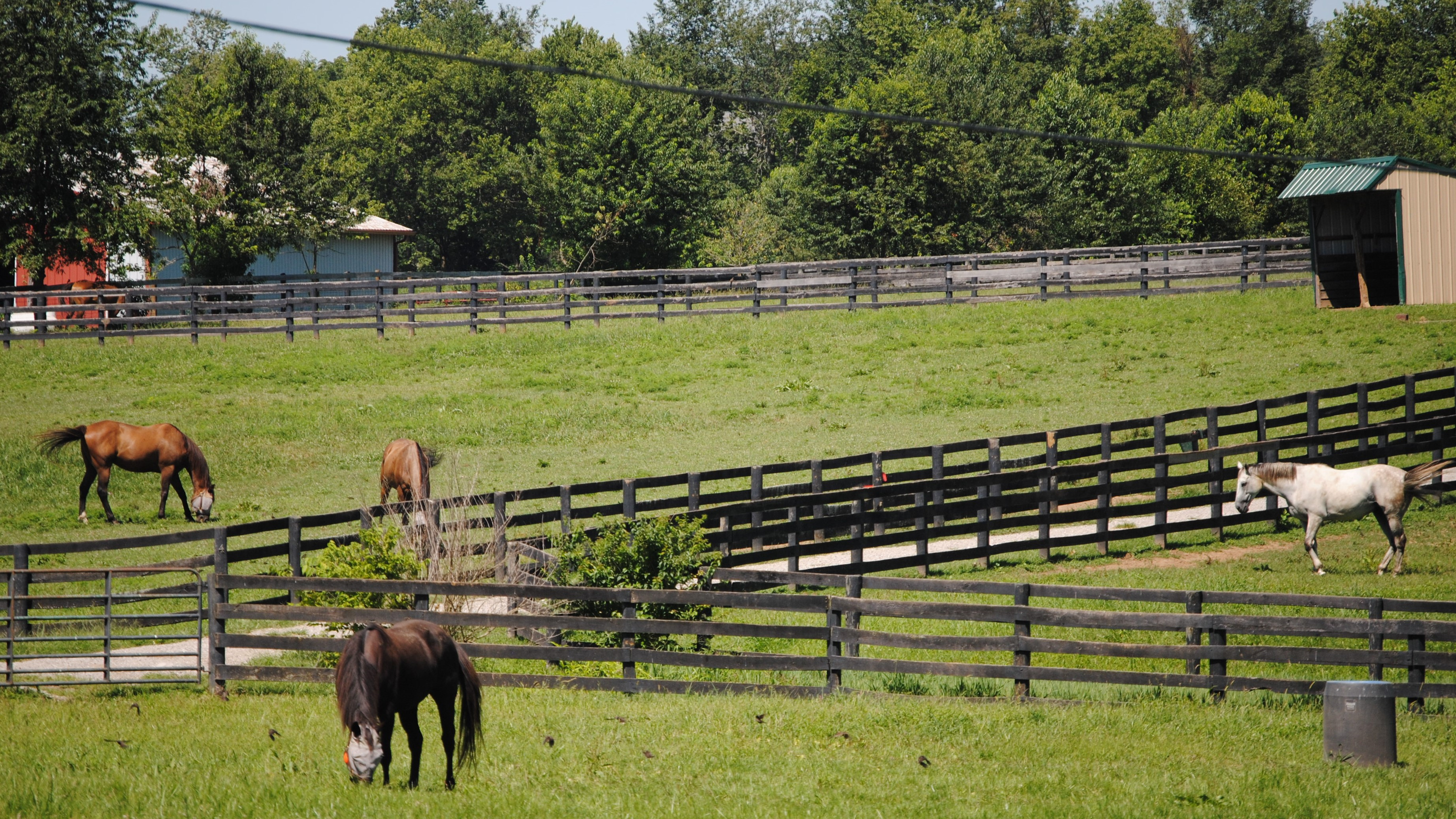
Old Friends Equine

As an 8-year-old Eldaafer also only had one victory. His first start was and allowance. At the start he was fourth but dropped back to sixth and then seventh, at the far turn he was sixth and look completely out contention. In the homestretch swung seven wide and ran late finishing third. His next start was in the Skip Away Stakes. At the start he was third and stayed there for the first quarter of a mile. Unfortunately, he faltered more and more as the race went on and finished fifth. He would try again in the Memorial Handicap. However he started eight and tried going four wide, however instead he faded and fell back to tenth and last place, he would also be 18 1/2 lengths behind the winner.

After that he tried another stakes race in the Stymie Stakes. At the start he was fourth and stayed until the first quarter of a mile. Then he moved up to third and stayed there until the far turn where he went four wide and went for second. Despite this move he could only get second after the winner Ponzi Scheme opened up his lead in the stretch. Finally, Eldaafer ran his last start in the Greenwood Cup. He started fifth and stayed in fifth for the first mile. Eldaafer then took the lead but Indian Jones would not give up the lead that easily. By the far turn he had the lead, but he was still challenged for that lead throughout the stretch by Indian Jones until they hit the wire together. It was Eldaafer by a nose. After the race he suffered a suspensory injury. Because of this he was retired after the race. Eldaafer lived at Old Friends in Georgetown, Kentucky, with his two best friends, Yahoo and Google the goats.

== Death ==
Eldaafer died on January 22, 2026, at the age of 20.
