= Dubai Golden Shaheen =

- Class: Group 1
- Location: Meydan Racecourse; Dubai, United Arab Emirates
- Inaugurated: 1996
- Race type: Thoroughbred - Flat racing
- Sponsor: Gulf News

Race information
- Distance: 1200 Metres (about 6 furlongs)
- Surface: Dirt
- Track: left-handed
- Qualification: Northern & Southern Hemisphere; 3-year-olds & up
- Weight: NH 3yo: 55kg. - SH 3yo: 58.5kg - NH & SH 4yo+: 60kg
- Purse: US$2,000,000
- Bonuses: see Global Sprint Challenge

The Dubai Golden Shaheen is a Group 1 flat horse race in the United Arab Emirates for three-year-old and above thoroughbreds run over a distance of 1,200 metres (approximately 6 furlongs) on the dirt course at Meydan Racecourse in Dubai in late March.

It was first run in December 1993 as the Nad Al Sheba Sprint, and its place in the calendar was moved in 1996 to be included in the Dubai World Cup Night held annually in March. The race took its present name in 2000 and it attained Group 1 status in 2002. Prior to 2010 it was run at Nad Al Sheba Racecourse. From 2012, Dubai Golden Shaheen joined Global Sprint Challenge and represents the third leg of the ten-race series.

The Dubai Golden Shaheen currently offers a purse of US$2 million.

== Records ==
Speed record:

- 1:08.10 - Big Jag (2000) (at Nad al Sheba)
- 1:09.01 - Zenden (2021) (at Meydan)

Most wins:

- 2 - Caller One (2001, 2002)
- 2 - Mind Your Biscuits (2017, 2018)
- 2 - Dark Saffron (2025, 2026)

Most wins by a jockey:

- 2 - Gary Stevens (1999, 2002)
- 2 - Alex Solis (2000, 2004)
- 2 - Joel Rosario (2017, 2018)
- 2 - Connor Beasley (2025, 2026)

Most wins by a trainer:

- 2 - Dhruba Selvaratnam (1998, 1999)
- 2 - James Chapman (2001, 2002)
- 2 - Chad Summers (2017, 2018)
- 2 - Bhupat Seemar (2022, 2024)
- 2 - Ahmad bin Harmash (2025, 2026)

Most wins by an owner:

- 2 - Carolyn Chapman & Theresa McArthur (2001, 2002)
- 2 - J Stables, Head Of Plains Partners LLC Et Al (2017, 2018)
- 2 - Sultan Ali (2025, 2026)

== Casualties and incidents ==
- 2012 - Race horse trainer Bob Baffert suffered a heart attack the day before the race. He recovered in time to see his horse, The Factor finish sixth in the race.
- 2021 - Race winner Zenden stumbled and ran into the infield after crossing the finish line. He suffered a compound fracture of his left front leg and was euthanized on the track.

== Winners ==
Year	Winner	Age	Jockey	Trainer	Owner	Time
1996	Kassbaan	6	John Carroll	Saeed bin Suroor	Maktoum Al Maktoum	1:13.04
1997	Atraf	4	Jerry Bailey	Kiaran McLaughlin	Hamdan Al Maktoum	1:11.24
1998	Mudallel	5	Willie Supple	Dhruba Selvaratnam	Ziad Galadari	1:10.61
1999	Ramp and Rave	5	Gary Stevens	Dhruba Selvaratnam	Ahmed Al Maktoum	1:09.97
2000	Big Jag	7	Alex Solis	Tim Pinfield	Julius Zolezzi	1:08.10
2001	Caller One	4	Corey Nakatani	James Chapman	C. Chapman, T. McArthur	1:08.38
2002	Caller One	5	Gary Stevens	James Chapman	C. Chapman, T. McArthur	1:09.91
2003	State City	4	Michael Hills	Paddy Rudkin	S M R M	1:09.95
2004	Our New Recruit	5	Alex Solis	John W. Sadler	CRK Stable	1:10.30
2005	Saratoga County	4	Javier Castellano	George Weaver	Evelyn Pollard	1:11.21
2006	Proud Tower Too	4	David Cohen	Sal Gonzalez	Tricar Stables	1:09.86
2007	Kelly's Landing	6	Frankie Dettori	Eddie Kenneally	Summerplace Farm	1:10.34
2008	Benny the Bull	5	Edgar Prado	Richard E. Dutrow, Jr.	IEAH Stables et al.	1:08.70
2009	Big City Man	4	Jose Verenzuela	Jerry Barton	Prince Sultan Mohammed Saud Al Kabeer	1:08:93
2010	Kinsale King	5	Garrett K. Gomez	Carl O'Callaghan	Super Horse Inc.	1:10.85
2011	Rocket Man	6	Felix Coetzee	Patrick Shaw	Alfredo L. A. Crabbia	1:11.28
2012	Krypton Factor	4	Kieren Fallon	Fawzi Abdulla Nass	Fawzi Abdulla Nass	1:10.79
2013	Reynaldothewizard	7	Richard Mullen	Satish Seemar	Zabeel Racing	1:12.46
2014	Sterling City	5	João Moreira	John Moore	Ling Chiu Shing and Gary Ling Kay Wai	1:10.88
2015	Secret Circle	6	Victor Espinoza	Bob Baffert	Karl Watson, Michael E. Pegram & Paul Weitman	1:10.64
2016	Muarrab	7	Paul Hanagan	Musabah Al Muhairi	Hamdan Al Maktoum	1:10.59
2017	Mind Your Biscuits	4	Joel Rosario	Chad Summers	J Stables, Head Of Plains Partners LLC Et Al	1:10.91
2018	Mind Your Biscuits	5	Joel Rosario	Chad Summers	J Stables, Head Of Plains Partners LLC Et Al	1:10.17
2019	X Y Jet	7	Emisael Jaramillo	Jorge Navarro	Rockingham Ranch & Gelfenstein Farm	1:10.75
2020	Cancelled due to the COVID-19 pandemic.					
2021	Zenden	5	Antonio Fresu	Carlos David	LLP Performance Horse	1:09.01
2022	Switzerland	8	Tadhg O'Shea	Bhupat Seemar	RRR Racing	1:11.13
2023	Sibelius	5	Ryan Moore	Jeremiah O'Dwyer	Jun Park & Delia Nash	1:10.69
2024	Tuz	7	Tadhg O'Shea	Bhupat Seemar	Dakki Stable	1:10.19
2025	Dark Saffron	3	Connor Beasley	Ahmad bin Harmash	Sultan Ali	1:11.40
2026	Dark Saffron	4	Connor Beasley	Ahmad bin Harmash	Sultan Ali	1:10.68

== See also ==
- List of United Arab Emirates horse races
