= Wando (horse) =

Canadian-bred Thoroughbred racehorse

- Sire: Langfuhr
- Grandsire: Danzig
- Dam: Kathie's Colleen
- Damsire: Woodman
- Sex: Stallion
- Foaled: 2000
- Died: January 22, 2014 (aged 13)
- Country: Canada
- Colour: Chestnut
- Breeder: Gus Schickedanz
- Owner: Gus Schickedanz
- Trainer: Michael Keogh
- Record: 23: 11-2-2
- Earnings: $2,563,038

Major wins
- Grey Stakes (2002); Marine Stakes (2003) Canadian Triple Crown wins: Queen's Plate (2003); Prince of Wales Stakes (2003); Breeders' Stakes (2003)

Awards
- 12th Canadian Triple Crown Champion (2003); Canadian 3-yr-Old Champion Colt (2003); Canadian Horse of the Year (2003)

Honours
- Canadian Horse Racing Hall of Fame (2014)

Wando (February 23, 2000 – January 22, 2014) was a Thoroughbred racehorse who won the Canadian Triple Crown in 2003. Wando was bred by Gustav Schickedanz at his farm Schomberg Farms in Schomberg, Ontario and ridden mainly by jockey Patrick Husbands. The chestnut stallion raced with moderate success as a four-year-old, and was then retired on 12 May 2005 to stand at stud at Lane's End Farm near Lexington, Kentucky. In 2011, the stallion returned to Schomberg, where he died of a heart attack on January 22, 2014. He is buried at Schomberg Farms.

In 2014, Wando was inducted into the Canadian Horse Racing Hall of Fame.

Pedigree of Wando, Chestnut stallion, 2000
Sire Langfuhr	Danzig	Northern Dancer	Nearctic
Sire Langfuhr	Danzig	Northern Dancer	Natalma
Sire Langfuhr	Danzig	Pas de Nom	Admiral's Voyage
Sire Langfuhr	Danzig	Pas de Nom	Petitioner
Sire Langfuhr	Sweet Briar Too	Briartic	Nearctic
Sire Langfuhr	Sweet Briar Too	Briartic	Sweet Lady Briar
Sire Langfuhr	Sweet Briar Too	Prima Babu Gum	Gummo
Sire Langfuhr	Sweet Briar Too	Prima Babu Gum	Princess Babu
Dam Kathie's Colleen	Woodman	Mr. Prospector	Raise a Native
Dam Kathie's Colleen	Woodman	Mr. Prospector	Gold Digger
Dam Kathie's Colleen	Woodman	Playmate	Buckpasser
Dam Kathie's Colleen	Woodman	Playmate	Intriguing
Dam Kathie's Colleen	Royal Colleen	Viceregal	Northern Dancer
Dam Kathie's Colleen	Royal Colleen	Viceregal	Victoria Regina
Dam Kathie's Colleen	Royal Colleen	Own Colleen	Queen's Own
Dam Kathie's Colleen	Royal Colleen	Own Colleen	Fair Colleen (family: 9-d)
