= Kinsale King =

American-bred Thoroughbred racehorse

- Sire: Yankee Victor
- Dam: Flaming Mirage
- Damsire: Woodman
- Sex: Gelding
- Foaled: 2005
- Country: United States
- Colour: Dark Bay/Brown
- Breeder: Marvin Little Jr.
- Owner: Patrick Sheehy
- Trainer: Carl O'Callaghan
- Record: 7: 4-0-1
- Earnings: $1,407,080

Major wins
- Vernon O. Underwood Stakes (2009); Palos Verdes Handicap (2010); Dubai Golden Shaheen (2010)

Kinsale King (foaled 2005) is an American Thoroughbred racehorse who won the Dubai Golden Shaheen.

Kinsale King's first trainer was Eoin Harty, but he was turned over to trainer Carl O'Callaghan during the 2009 Del Mar Racetrack summer meet. Kinsale King's first stakes win was in the Vernon O. Underwood Stakes at Hollywood Park Racetrack on December 6. He followed that up by winning the Grade 2 Palos Verdes Handicap on January 23, 2010. He won at odds of 9:1 while defeating Breeder's Cup Sprint winner Dancing in Silks. Kinsale King came to fame when he earned his third straight stakes win in the Dubai Golden Shaheen on March 27. His win continued the United States' dominance in that race in which they had won nine of the past eleven renewals. Kinsale King's next race was on June 19 at Ascot Racecourse in the Golden Jubilee Stakes on turf. He finished third by a head to the longshot Society Rock having been on the heels of Starspangledbanner, the eventual winner.

The 2016 film Chasing the Win is all about Kinsale King's racing career.
