= Breeders' Cup Juvenile Sprint =

American Thoroughbred horse race

- Class: Ungraded
- Location: United States
- Inaugurated: 2011
- Race type: Thoroughbred - Flat racing
- Website: www.breederscup.com

Race information
- Distance: 6 furlongs
- Surface: Dirt
- Track: left-handed
- Qualification: Two-years-old
- Purse: $500,000

The Breeders' Cup Juvenile Sprint was an ungraded American Thoroughbred horse race established in 2011 as part of the annual Breeders' Cup World Championships. The race, open to two-year-old colts, geldings and fillies, carried a purse of $500,000.

The inaugural running took place on the first day of the Breeders' Cup at the 2011 host track, Churchill Downs in Louisville, Kentucky.

Due to technical requirements, the race was not eligible for classification as a graded stakes race in its two runnings. The American Graded Stakes Committee of the Thoroughbred Owners and Breeders Association, the body that controls grading of North American stakes races, requires that a race be run under the same conditions for at least two years before it can be graded.

In March 2013, the Breeders' Cup board of directors voted to drop the race from its program of championships after it had only five competitors in 2012. "The number of starters and overall quality of the Juvenile Sprint fields for its two runnings did not meet the standards expected for the Championships," said Craig Fravel, Breeders’ Cup president and CEO. "We also believe that the Juvenile Sprint had a negative impact on field sizes for both the Breeders’ Cup Juvenile and Juvenile Fillies."

The small field for the 2012 race was attributed in part to the newly enacted ban on the race-day use of Furosemide for two-year-olds competing in the Breeders' Cup. The drug, also known as Lasix, is widely used by North American trainers to inhibit pulmonary bleeding in a horse that has just raced. It is not allowed to be used on race day in most of the world's other racing jurisdictions. The 2011 winner Secret Circle went on to win the Breeders' Cup Sprint in 2013.

== Records ==
Most wins by a jockey:

- No jockey won this race more than once.

Most wins by a trainer:

- No trainer won this race more than once.

Most wins by an owner:

- No owner won this race more than once.

== Winners ==
Year	Winner	Jockey	Trainer	Owner	Time	Purse	Grade
2012	Hightail	Rajiv Maragh	D. Wayne Lukas	Bluegrass Hall	1:09.75	$454,000	
2011	Secret Circle	Rafael Bejarano	Bob Baffert	Mike Pegram, Karl Watson, & Paul Weitman	1:10.52	$500,000	
