= Secret Circle (horse) =

American-bred Thoroughbred racehorse

- Sire: Eddington
- Grandsire: Unbridled
- Dam: Ragtime Hope
- Damsire: Dixieland Band
- Sex: Colt
- Foaled: 2009
- Country: United States
- Colour: Bay
- Breeder: Willmott Stables
- Owner: Michael E. Pegram; Karl Watson; Paul Weitman
- Trainer: Bob Baffert
- Jockey: Martin Garcia
- Record: 16; 8-6-1
- Earnings: $2,424,790

Major wins
- Breeders' Cup Juvenile Sprint (2011); Southwest Stakes (2012); Rebel Stakes (2012); Breeders' Cup Sprint (2013); Dubai Golden Shaheen (2015)

Secret Circle (foaled April 13, 2009) is a Thoroughbred race horse who won the 2011 Breeders' Cup Juvenile Sprint, 2013 Breeders' Cup Sprint, and Dubai Golden Shaheen.

== Background ==
The horse was bred by Willmott Stables. He was sired by Eddington, a California-based stallion who won the 2005 Pimlico Special.

== Racing career ==
=== 2011: two-year-old season ===
Secret Circle broke his maiden at Del Mar on July 23, 2011, going 5 1/2 furlongs on the all-weather track. He sped to the lead, dueled inside with Basmati. He inched away on the turn and drew off in the stretch to win by 7 1/4 lengths. He was ridden by Rafael Bejarano. The horse made his stakes debut in the Jack Goodman Stakes on October 11, 2011, going six furlongs at Santa Anita Park. He had speed between foes, then stalked the pace a bit off the rail, came out three deep into the stretch, gained the lead in upper stretch, inched away. Was ridden along to widen past the furlong marker while drifting in and was under a long hold late. The final time was 1:08.27.

Secret Circle's next start was the Breeders' Cup Juvenile Sprint, on November 4, 2011, at Churchill Downs. He bumped with Shumoos leaving the gate, quickly recovered and forced a sharp pace in about path two, dueled with a slim advantage mid turn, shook clear of Trinniberg in upper stretch, widened his margin with a furlong remaining, wandered out towards the center of the track near the sixteenth pole, was guided back down and held on to win by a length. He completed the six furlongs in 1:10.52 and capped an undefeated season.

=== 2012 & 2013: two- and three-year-old seasons ===
In 2013, Secret Circle returned from being injured in the 2012 Arkansas Derby, where he finished 2nd to Bodemeister, by winning an allowance race at Santa Anita Racetrack. Secret Circle's next race was the Breeders' Cup Sprint, which he won by a neck.

=== 2014: five-year-old season ===
Secret Circle made his 2014 debut in the Grade II Palos Verdes Handicap on February 2, 2014, at Santa Anita Park. He had good early speed between horses, dueled inside, put a head in front past the eighth pole, inched away from his pace rival in deep stretch but could not hold off the eventual winner Wild Dude. Secret Circle was expected to run in the Grade III Count Fleet Sprint on April 10, 2014, at Oaklawn Park but was mistakenly tranquilized when flown. Medications need 48 hours to clear, so he was forced to be scratched. He didn't race again until Grade I Santa Anita Sprint Championship on October 4, 2014. Facing Breeders' Cup Dirt Mile winner Goldencents, Secret Circle had good early speed and dueled inside, put a head in front on the turn, fought back leaving the turn and into the stretch and held third.

The Santa Anita Sprint Championship was a prep for the Breeders' Cup Xpressbet Sprint. He was unable to repeat his 2013 success, but finished a very game second to Work All Week, getting beat by 1/2 length. He traveled to the east coast for a start in the Cigar Mile Handicap on November 29, 2014. Secret Circle stumbled badly at the start, but recovered to finish second.

=== 2015: six-year-old season ===
It was confirmed that Secret Circle would return for a six-year-old campaign, and won the Golden Shaheen at Meydan Racecourse with Victor Espinoza as jockey. It will likely by his last year, with the Breeder's Cup Sprint at Keeneland being his ultimate target.
