= Afleet Again =

American-bred Thoroughbred racehorse

- Sire: Afleet Alex
- Grandsire: Northern Afleet
- Dam: Lucky Again
- Damsire: Wild Again
- Sex: Stallion
- Foaled: April 28, 2007
- Country: United States
- Color: Gray
- Breeder: Roll Z Dice Stable
- Owner: Cash Is King Racing; Robert & Susan Krangel (Kasey K Stable)
- Trainer: Robert E. Reid, Jr.
- Record: 25: 4–5–3
- Earnings: $695,299

Major wins
- Withers Stakes (2010); Breeders' Cup wins: Breeders' Cup Marathon (2011)

Afleet Again (April 28, 2007 - April 12, 2018) was an American Thoroughbred racehorse best known for winning the 2011 Breeders' Cup Marathon Stakes as a 41–1 upset.

== Background ==
Afleet Again, a gray horse, was foaled in Kentucky. He was bred by Roll Z Dice Racing Stable. He was sired by Afleet Alex, the 2005 Preakness Stakes and Belmont Stakes winner. His dam, Lucky Again, is a daughter of inaugural Breeders' Cup Classic winner Wild Again. Lucky Again has also produced Oh So Bella, a full sister to Afleet Again, who is graded stakes-placed. Northern Afleet, Afleet Again's grandsire, is the sire of Breeders' Cup winners Amazombie and World Approval, as well as Afleet Alex.

Afleet Again was trained by Robert "Butch" Reid Jr. and owned by Cash Is King Racing Stable (owners of Afleet Alex) and Kasey K Racing Stable during his career.

== Racing career ==
=== Two and three-year-old seasons ===
Afleet Again broke his maiden as a juvenile in his fourth start at Parx Casino and Racing.

Afleet Again opened his sophomore season with a fifth-place finish in the Count Fleet Stakes at Aqueduct Racetrack, and returned to the winner's circle in his next race, an allowance. After running second in the Whirlaway Stakes, he contested his first graded stakes race, the 2010 Gr.III Gotham Stakes, finishing a poor 10th. Afleet Again's first big win came next when he upset the Gr.III Withers Stakes, defeating multiple graded stakes winner D'Funnybone and stakes winner Ibboyee. The following month in March, he finished second in the Spend a Buck Stakes, and then third in the Gr.III Pegasus Stakes.

Afleet Again stepped up into Grade One company for the first time in the Haskell Invitational. The 2010 Haskell field included Kentucky Derby winner Super Saver, Kentucky Derby-placed Ice Box, Preakness Stakes winner Lookin At Lucky, Preakness-placed First Dude, and stakes winner Trappe Shot. Afleet Again finished fifth in a field of six. He ran once more in top company, contesting the Travers Stakes. The race was won by Afleet Express, another son of Afleet Alex, with Fly Down and First Dude behind in second and third; Afleet Again finished a good fourth. Afleet Again's last race of 2010 was the Gr.II Pennsylvania Derby, where he finished fifth.

Afleet Again began 2011 with a runner-up finish in an allowance race, followed by a pair of fifth-place runs in the One Count Stakes and Brooklyn Handicap. He then finished second in the Greenwood Cup Stakes.

=== 2011 Breeder's Cup ===
Despite a string of poor performances in stakes races, Afleet Again was entered in the 2011 Breeders' Cup Marathon at 1 3/4 miles. He was the longest shot on the board at 41–1. The field included fellow distance runners Eldaafer, the 2010 Marathon winner, Brooklyn Handicap winner Birdrun, and Clark Handicap winner Giant Oak, among others. Graded stakes winner Pleasant Prince led throughout most of the race, fading around the turn, with a string of horses, including Afleet Again, taking over at the front. Cease, a son of War Front, took the lead down the stretch, but was overtaken by Afleet Again, who was piloted by Cornelio Velasquez, flew on the outside to win by 2 1/4 lengths, defeating Birdrun and Giant Oak.

He finished the race in a final time of 3:00.39 and paid $85.20 to win. His win snapped an eight race losing streak. Robert Reid, Afleet Again's trainer, said after the race, “He ran fabulously. It's so rare to get this kind of distance, so we decided to take a shot. We always thought he could go this far. There's no limit to how far he can run. When I saw a 48 (fraction) for the first half and we were only seven or eight lengths out of it, I thought we were in pretty good shape.”

Afleet Again's final race came in December 2011 at Woodbine Racetrack, when he contested the Valedictory Stakes. He finished fourth behind Queen's Plate winner Eye of the Leopard, Harrods Creek, and Eagle Poise.

He retired after 2011 with a record of 25: 4-5-3 and earnings of $695,299.

== Stud career and death ==
Afleet Again was consigned as a stallion prospect at the Keeneland 2012 Breeding Stock Sale, and was purchased for $30,000 by Yoon Heung Yul of South Korea. Sent to South Korea, Alfeet Again stood stallion duties at Happy Farm, a small farm home to a broodmare band and other stallions.

Afleet Again's progeny have yet to win stakes races, though they are multiple winners.

Afleet Again succumbed to colic on April 12, 2018, at the age of 10.
