= Thoroughbred Aftercare Alliance Stakes =

American Thoroughbred horse race

The Thoroughbred Aftercare Alliance Stakes
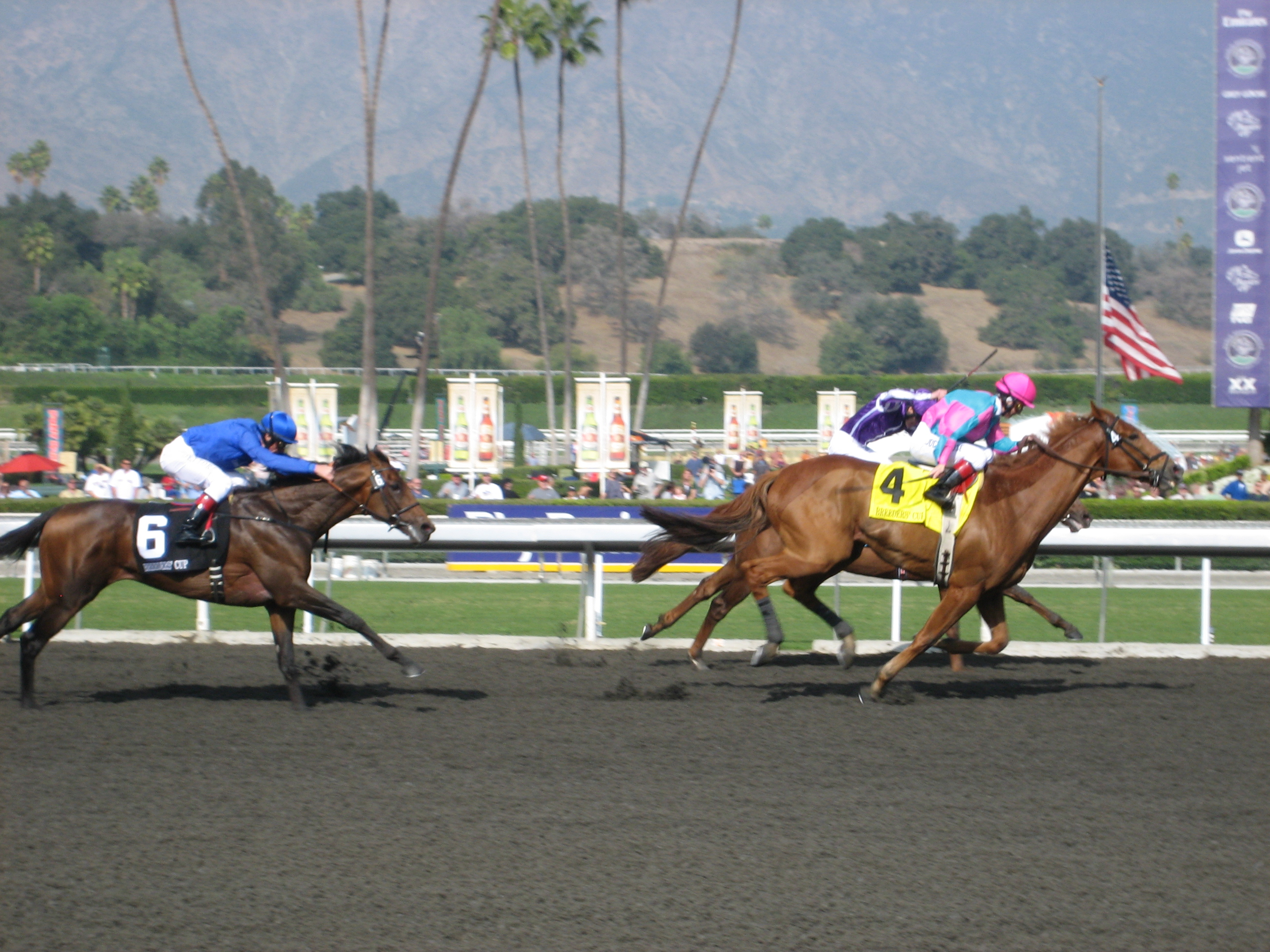
- The 2009 Marathon, Man of Iron, hidden on the rail defeating Cloudy's Knight by a nose
- Class: Ungraded
- Location: Dependant on where the Breeders' Cup is held that year (See Winner section)
- Inaugurated: 2008 (as Breeders' Cup Marathon at Santa Anita Park)
- Race type: Thoroughbred – Flat racing
- Sponsor: Thoroughbred Aftercare Alliance (since 2017)

Race information
- Distance: 1 mile (since 2024)
- Surface: Turf
- Track: left-handed
- Qualification: two-year-olds
- Weight: 122 lbs with allowances
- Purse: $200,000 (since 2024)

The Thoroughbred Aftercare Alliance Stakes is a ungraded American Thoroughbred horse race for two year olds over a distance of one mile on the turf. Previously, the event was a Grade II event for three-year-olds and up, and contested on dirt usually at a distance of 1 5/8 miles. The race has a purse of US$200,000. It is run as part of the undercard on either the Friday card or Saturday card of the Breeders' Cup.

== Race history ==
The race was originally established in 2008 as part of the annual Breeders' Cup World Championships with its inaugural running on October 25, 2008 at a distance of 1 1/2 miles as the Breeders' Cup Marathon. The inaugural running took place on the second day of the Breeders' Cup on the Pro-Ride synthetic dirt at the 2008 host track, Santa Anita Park in Arcadia, California.

In 2009, the distance was extended by 2 furlongs to 1 3/4 miles.

Due to technical requirements, the race was not eligible for classification as a graded stakes race in its first two runnings. It received Grade III status effective in 2010. The race was upgraded to Grade II status for 2011. The race was originally run under Weight for Age conditions.

=== Removal from Breeders' Cup ===
On April 25, 2014, the Breeders' Cup announced that the Marathon would be discontinued. The event was renamed to the Marathon Stakes as an undercard Breeders' Cup stakes race. The purse of the event was reduced from $500,000 to $200,000. The first year, the race was sponsored by the Las Vegas Tourism Board. The event's conditions were changed to Set Weights with allowances.

Citing that "the conditions of the race have not developed into a competition that we believe reaches the standard set by the remaining races comprising the Championships", the Breeders' Cup Committee announced its discontinuation.

However, the venue that holds the Breeders' Cup has been running the event with separate sponsorship.

In 2020 the event was renamed to the Thoroughbred Aftercare Alliance Stakes, sponsors since 2017.

In 2024 the event was downgraded by the Thoroughbred Owners and Breeders Association to Grade III status. However, the Breeders' Cup undercard changed the conditions of the event from a Marathon distance for older horses to a two-year-old turf event over one mile. The event was run as an ungraded black-type event.

== Records ==
Margins:

- 9 1/4 lengths – Cary Street (2014)

Most wins:

- 2 – Rocketry (2018, 2020)

Most wins by a jockey:

- 2 – John R. Velazquez (2010, 2017)
- 2 – Joel Rosario (2015, 2018)

Most wins by a trainer:

- 2 – Brendan P. Walsh (2014, 2016)
- 2 – James Jerkens (2018, 2020)

Most wins by an owner:

- 2 – Centennial Farms (2018, 2020)

== Winners ==
Year	Winner	Age	Jockey	Trainer	Owner	Distance	Time	Purse	Grade	Ref
Thoroughbred Aftercare Alliance Stakes
2026	Real Goodbar	2	Emmanuel Esquivel	Kenneth McPeek	Bayview Stables, Edwards, Mark and Trout, Mike	1 mile	1:36.58	$238,875	Listed	
2025	Conducted	2	Hector Berrios	O. Jauregui	Eplin, Danny A., Iavarone, Julia C., Iavarone, Michael and Spencer, Arthur	1 mile	1:36.53	$201,500	Listed	
2024	Chasing Liberty	2	Irad Ortiz Jr.	Rob Atras	Twin Creeks Racing Stables LLC	1 mile	1:37.44	$204,500	Black Type	
2023	Salesman (IRE)	6	Flavien Prat	Richard E. Mandella	Wertheimer et Frère	1 5/8 miles	2:44.08	$250,000	II	
2022	Next	4	Luan Machado	William Cowans	Michael A. Foster	1 5/8 miles	2:42.59	$342,667	II	
2021	Lone Rock	6	Ramon Vazquez	Robertino Diodoro	Flying P Stable & R. A. Hill Stable	1 5/8 miles	2:42.61†	$250,000	II	
2020	Rocketry	6	Irad Ortiz Jr.	James A. Jerkens	Centennial Farms	1 5/8 miles	2:42.57	$200,000	II	
Marathon Stakes
2019	Itsinthepost (FR)	7	Drayden Van Dyke	Jeff Mullins	Red Baron's Barn	1 3/4 miles	3:03.95	$200,351	II	
2018	Rocketry	4	Joel Rosario	James A. Jerkens	Centennial Farms	1 3/4 miles	2:57.62	$200,000	II	
2017	Destin	4	John R. Velazquez	Todd A. Pletcher	Twin Creeks Racing Stables & Eclipse Thoroughbred Partners	1 3/4 miles	2:57.77	$201,035	II	
2016	Scuba	5	Kendrick Carmouche	Brendan P. Walsh	DARRS	1 3/4 miles	2:58.20	$201,380	II	
2015	Bailoutbobby	5	Joel Rosario	Doug F. O'Neill	R3 Racing	1 3/4 miles	2:56.75	$200,000	II	
Las Vegas Marathon Stakes
2014	Cary Street	5	Miguel Mena	Brendan P. Walsh	Brendan P. Walsh & Marc Detampel	1 3/4 miles	2:58.29	$200,750	II	
Breeders' Cup Marathon
2013	London Bridge	3	Mike E. Smith	Jo Hughes	Eastwind Racing & Martha Trussell	1 3/4 miles	2:58.32	$460,000	II	
2012	Calidoscopio (ARG)	9	Aaron Gryder	Guillermo Frankel	Stud Dona Pancha	1 3/4 miles	2:57.25	$454,500	II	
2011	Afleet Again	4	Cornelio Velasquez	Robert E. Reid Jr.	Kasey K Racing Stable	1 3/4 miles	3:00.39	$454,500	II	
2010	Eldaafer	5	John R. Velazquez	Diane D. Morici	IEAH Stables and Mansour Albaroudy	1 3/4 miles	2:59.62	$454,500	III	
2009	Man of Iron	3	Johnny Murtagh	Aidan P. O'Brien	Derrick Smith, Susan Magnier, Michael Tabor	1 3/4 miles	2:54.11	$454,500	Listed	
2008	Muhannak (IRE)	4	Patrick J. Smullen	Ralph Beckett	Richard Pegum	1 1/2 miles	2:28.24	$496,930	Listed	

Legend:
All Weather Track Dirt Turf
Notes:
† New track record

== See also ==
- Breeders' Cup Marathon "top three finishers" and starters
- Breeders' Cup World Thoroughbred Championships
- American thoroughbred racing top attended events
- List of American and Canadian Graded races
