= Canadian Champion Three-Year-Old Male Horse =

Horse racing honour

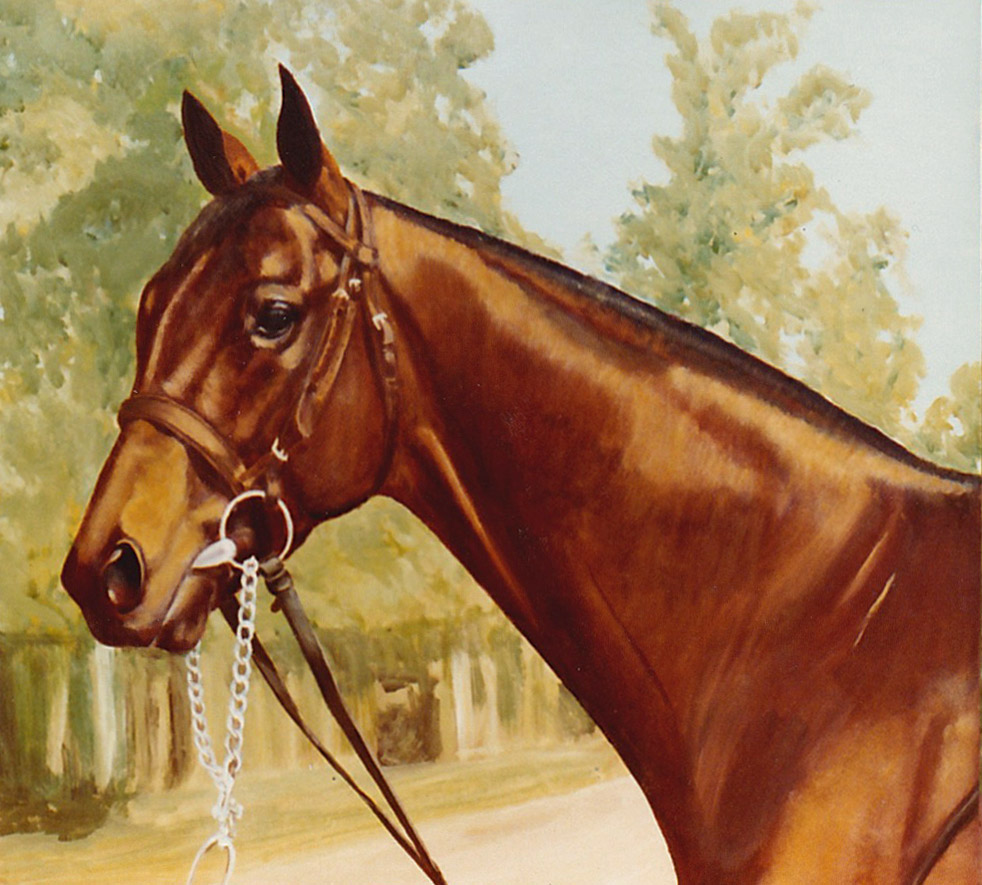
Norcliffe, painted by Bob Demuyser (1920-2003)

The Canadian Champion Three-Year-Old Male Horse is a Canadian Thoroughbred horse racing honour. Created in 1975 by the Jockey Club of Canada, it is part of the Sovereign Awards program and is awarded annually to the top 3-Year-Old male Thoroughbred horse competing in Canada.

== Past winners ==
- 1975 : L'Enjoleur
- 1976 : Norcliffe
- 1977 : Dance In Time
- 1978 : Overskate
- 1979 : Steady Growth
- 1980 : Ben Fab
- 1981 : Frost King
- 1982 : Runaway Groom
- 1983 : Bompago
- 1984 : Key to the Moon
- 1985 : Imperial Choice
- 1986 : Golden Choice
- 1987 : Afleet
- 1988 : Regal Intention
- 1989 : With Approval
- 1990 : Izvestia
- 1991 : Bolulight
- 1992 : Benburb
- 1993 : Peteski
- 1994 : Bruce's Mill
- 1995 : Peaks and Valleys
- 1996 : Victor Cooley
- 1997 : Cryptocloser
- 1998 : Archers Bay
- 1999 : Woodcarver
- 2000 : Kiss A Native
- 2001 : Win City
- 2002 : Le Cinquieme Essai
- 2003 : Wando
- 2004 : A Bit O'Gold
- 2005 : Palladio
- 2006 : Shillelagh Slew
- 2007 : Alezzandro
- 2008 : Not Bourbon
- 2009 : Eye of the Leopard
- 2010 : Big Red Mike
- 2011 : Pender Harbour
- 2012 : Strait of Dover
- 2013 : Up With the Birds
- 2014 : Heart to Heart
- 2015 : Shaman Ghost
- 2016 : Amis Gizmo
- 2017 : Channel Maker
- 2018 : Sky Promise
- 2019 : Global Access
- 2020 : Mighty Heart
- 2021 : Frosted Over
- 2022 : Sir For Sure
- 2023 : Paramount Prince
- 2024 : Dresden Row
