= Shaman Ghost =

Canadian Thoroughbred racehorse

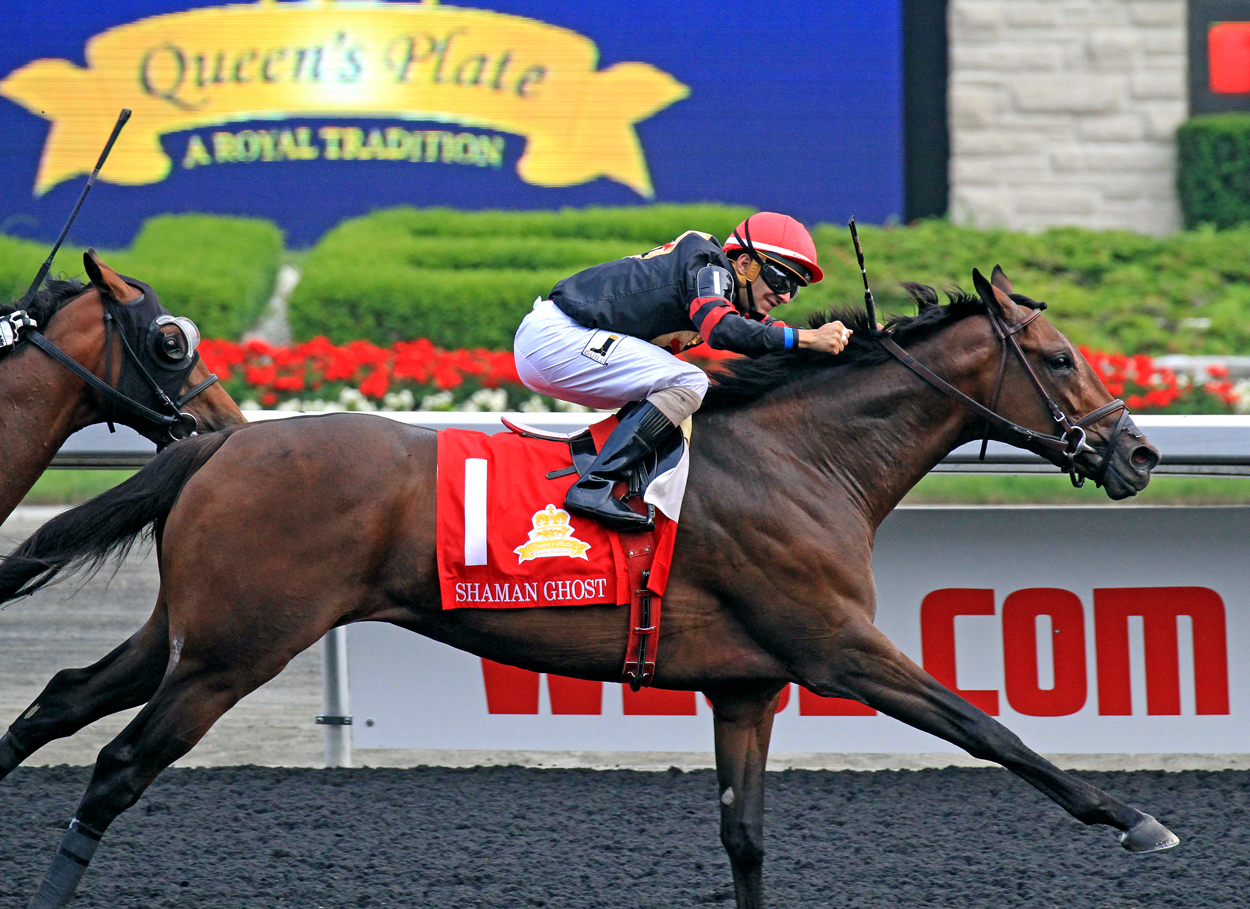
- Shaman Ghost winning the Queen's Plate
- Sire: Ghostzapper
- Grandsire: Awesome Again
- Dam: Getback Time
- Damsire: Gilded Time
- Sex: Colt
- Foaled: May 5, 2012
- Country: Canada
- Colour: Bay
- Breeder: Adena Springs
- Owner: Stronach Stables
- Trainer: Brian Lynch (2014–2015); Jimmy Jerkens (2016–2017)
- Record: 17: 8-3-2
- Earnings: US$3,859,311

Major wins
- Marine Stakes (2015); Brooklyn Invitational (2016); Woodward Stakes (2016); Santa Anita Handicap (2017); Pimlico Special Handicap (2017); Canadian Triple Crown wins: Queen's Plate (2015)

Awards
- Canadian Champion Three-Year-Old Colt

Honours
- Canadian Horse Racing Hall of Fame (2018)
- Last updated on December 4, 2017

Shaman Ghost (foaled May 5, 2012) is a retired Thoroughbred racehorse who won the 2015 Queen's Plate and was named Canadian Champion Three-Year-Old Colt. In 2016, he won two graded stakes races in the United States, including the prestigious Woodward Stakes. He started 2017 with a runner-up performance in the world's richest horse race, the Pegasus World Cup, followed up by wins in the Santa Anita Handicap and Pimlico Special. He was inducted into the Canadian Horse Racing Hall of Fame in 2018.

== Background ==
Shaman Ghost was bred in Canada by Frank Stronach's Adena Springs and raced as a homebred for Stronach Stables. His sire Ghostzapper and grandsire Awesome Again also ran for Stronach, winning the Breeders' Cup Classic in 2003 and 1998 respectively. Ghostzapper was a "freakishly talented" racehorse whose career as a stallion has been somewhat hampered by the fact that his best runners tend to develop late. Shaman Ghost was the third foal and first winner out of Getback Time, a stakes-placed mare by Gilded Time.

== Racing career ==
Shaman Ghost raced only twice as a two-year-old, finishing out of the money both times. "He was never a precocious two-year-old. He was a slow learner," his trainer Brian Lynch said later. "I always thought he was talented, it just took him a few starts to get it together."

=== 2015: three-year-old campaign ===
His three-year-old season started the same way, with a fourth-place finish in a maiden special weight race at Gulfstream Park on January 3, 2015. After losses on Polytrack, dirt and turf, Lynch decided to change things up by removing the blinkers the horse had previously worn. On March 14 at Gulfstream Park, Shaman Ghost won his first race, following up with an allowance race win on April 9 at Keeneland. On May 16, he was shipped to Woodbine Racetrack for the Grade III Marine Stakes at a distance of 1 1/16 miles. In spite of his two-race winning streak, he was a longshot in the nine-horse field at 13–1. Shaman Ghost raced near the back of the field for most of the race, then started his move on the far turn. He made up ground quickly but then ran into traffic, checked and moved to the outside. Once in the clear, he regained his stride and pulled away to win by half a length.

On July 5, Shaman Ghost entered the Queen's Plate, the first leg of the Canadian Triple Crown and run over Woodbine's Polytrack surface at a distance of 1 1/4 miles. He was the 3-1 co-favorite with Danish Dynaformer, the winner of the Plate Trial Stakes. The two raced behind a fast early pace, then Danish Dynaformer made his move on the far turn, hitting the lead in mid-stretch. At that point, Shaman Ghost was in fourth, but started closing ground on the outside, drawing away in the final strides to win by 1 1/4 lengths. "He (Danish Dynaformer) made a move too early, I let him pass me," said jockey Rafael Manuel Hernandez. "I know my horse always got a kick... and we got them back." It was the first Queen's Plate win for both Hernandez and Lynch, and the third for Stronach.

Shaman Ghost's next start was the Prince of Wales Stakes, the second leg of the Canadian Triple Crown, held at Fort Erie Race Track on July 28. He was the 3-2 favorite but lost by a neck to longshot Breaking Lucky after a less than ideal trip. "I was inside down the backside and had to stay where I was and make one run," said Hernandez. "It looked like we were done down the lane, but he came back again and almost got there."

Shaman Ghost did not enter the Breeders' Stakes, the third leg of the Triple Crown, and missed the rest of the year after undergoing surgery on his ankle. Finishing the year with four wins and a second in six races, he received the Sovereign Award for Canadian Champion Three-Year-Old Colt.

=== 2016: four-year-old campaign ===
In December 2015, Shaman Ghost was switched to the stable of Jimmy Jerkens, who gave the colt time to recover from the ankle surgery, then entered him an allowance optional claiming race at Belmont Park on May 21, 2016. He finished third, but Jerkens felt the race was "a lot better than it looks on paper." Shaman Ghost's next start was on June 7 in the Grade II Brooklyn Invitational at Belmont Park. He raced behind a slow early pace in the 1 1/2-mile race, then accelerated past the field in the stretch to win by 4 1/4 lengths. "Everything pretty much went as planned," said jockey Joel Rosario. "He was very comfortable, and relaxed and finished strong."

On July 9, Shaman Ghost finished fifth behind stablemate Effinex in the Suburban Handicap at Belmont Park. He came down with a nagging cough, but recovered when Jerkens moved his barn to Saratoga for the summer. On September 3, Shaman Ghost was entered in the Grade I Woodward Stakes, in which Frosted was the 2-5 favorite after wins in the Metropolitan Handicap and Whitney Stakes. Shaman Ghost raced close to the pace in fourth for most of the race, then moved wide around the far turn to start passing the early leaders. In the stretch, he was overtaken by Mubtaahij on the inside and Frosted on the outside. Frosted reached the lead mid-stretch, then drifted in front of Shaman Ghost. Shaman Ghost switched paths to the gap between the two leaders and started to close ground. At the wire, the three horses were separated by a head, with Shaman Ghost in first and Frosted in third. "I almost decided to go around the horses," said jockey Javier Castellano. "But when I see Frosted he went out wide, I thought the only chance I could beat him was cut the corner, split horses, and go from there."

Shaman Ghost's next race was supposed to be the Breeders' Cup Classic on November 5, but he spiked a fever and was scratched. He finished his 2016 campaign with a third-place finish in the Clark Handicap at Churchill Downs on November 25. Because he did not race during the year in Canada, he was not eligible for the Sovereign Awards. However, he did help Adena Springs win the Sovereign Award for Best Breeder.

=== 2017: five-year-old season ===
The owner of multiple racetracks including Gulfstream Park, Stronach was responsible for the creation of the Pegasus World Cup, the world's richest horse race, run for the first time on January 28, 2017, at Gulfstream. He entered Shaman Ghost in the race at a cost of $1,000,000 against the two best racehorses in the world, California Chrome and Arrogate. Shaman Ghost responded with a second-place finish behind Arrogate, earning $1.75 million. "He kept on coming against a lot of nice horses," Jerkens said. "They saw Arrogate out there galloping along and they couldn't make any headway and threw in the towel and he kept it up."

Shaman Ghost made his next start on March 11 in the Santa Anita Handicap. In the early going, he was positioned on the rail a few lengths behind the early pace set by Midnight Storm, then moved to the outside as they rounded the far turn into the stretch. He closed ground rapidly but lost some momentum when Midnight Storm started drifting into his path. With an eighth of a mile remaining, Castellano hit Shaman Ghost left-handed and guided the horse out to the center of the racetrack to avoid engaging Midnight Storm. Shaman Ghost then regained his stride and pull away to win by 3/4 lengths in a time of 2:01.57 for 1 1/4 miles. "Of course any time you win a grade 1 it is a thrill, especially this race," said Stronach, who also owns Santa Anita racetrack. "I was kind of sitting there quiet (watching the race). He's had a lot of bad racing luck and he's better than what he has shown. Today it all worked out."

On May 19, Shaman Ghost won the Pimlico Special by a neck over Dolphus, a half-brother to Hall of Famer Rachel Alexandra. Despite a slow early pace, Shaman Ghost completed the distance of 1 3/16 in a solid time of 1:54.55. On his next start in the Suburban Handicap on July 8, he raced in second behind a slow early pace, then moved to the lead as they entered the stretch. He was passed in the final eighth of a mile though by Keen Ice, best known for upsetting American Pharoah in the 2015 Travers Stakes. "Turning for home, he ended up on the lead... he waited a little bit, but the other horse is a nice horse," said Castellano. "You never know which Keen Ice is going to show up."

Shaman Ghost was scheduled to make his next start in the Woodward Stakes on September 2 but developed breathing issues that required throat surgery, performed on August 13.

== Retirement ==
Shaman Ghost was retired from racing in December 2017. He stood the 2018 season at stud in California for a fee of $10,000. Stronach felt Shaman Ghost's presence would help strengthen the California-bred program, a key element in the success of the state's racetracks. He was relocated to Adena Springs for the 2019 season, where he will be stabled in the stall next to his sire, Ghostzapper.

Shaman Ghost was inducted into the Canadian Horse Racing Hall of Fame in August 2018.

== Pedigree ==
Pedigree of Shaman Ghost, bay colt, May 5, 2012
Sire Ghostzapper 2000	Awesome Again; 1994	Deputy Minister	Vice Regent
Sire Ghostzapper 2000	Awesome Again; 1994	Deputy Minister	Mint Copy
Sire Ghostzapper 2000	Awesome Again; 1994	Primal Force	Blushing Groom (FR)
Sire Ghostzapper 2000	Awesome Again; 1994	Primal Force	Prime Prospect
Sire Ghostzapper 2000	Baby Zip; 1991	Relaunch	In Reality
Sire Ghostzapper 2000	Baby Zip; 1991	Relaunch	Foggy Note
Sire Ghostzapper 2000	Baby Zip; 1991	Thirty Zip	Tri Jet
Sire Ghostzapper 2000	Baby Zip; 1991	Thirty Zip	Salaway
Dam Getback Time 2003	Gilded Time; 1990	Timeless Moment	Damascus
Dam Getback Time 2003	Gilded Time; 1990	Timeless Moment	Hour of Parting
Dam Getback Time 2003	Gilded Time; 1990	Gilded Lilly	What a Pleasure
Dam Getback Time 2003	Gilded Time; 1990	Gilded Lilly	Luquillo
Dam Getback Time 2003	Shay; 1994	Incinderator	Northern Dancer
Dam Getback Time 2003	Shay; 1994	Incinderator	Princess Karenda
Dam Getback Time 2003	Shay; 1994	Lookin Like a Lady	Skywalker
Dam Getback Time 2003	Shay; 1994	Lookin Like a Lady	Tenedora (family: 1-g)

Shaman's Ghost is inbred 3S x 5D to Relaunch, meaning Relaunch appears in the 3rd generation of the sire's side of the pedigree and in the 5th generation of the dam's side. Shaman's Ghost is also inbred 5S x 4D to Northern Dancer.
