= Little Mike =

American-bred Thoroughbred racehorse

- Little Mike at Old Friends (2024)
- Sire: Spanish Steps
- Grandsire: Unbridled
- Dam: Hay Jude
- Damsire: Wavering Monarch
- Sex: Gelding
- Foaled: May 24, 2007 in Florida
- Country: United States
- Colour: Bay
- Breeder: Carlo E. Vaccarezza
- Owner: Priscilla Vaccarezza
- Trainer: 1) William White (2009); 2) Allen Iwinski (2010–2011); 3) Dale Romans (2011–2013); 4) Carlo Vaccarezza (2014-2016)
- Record: 30: 14-2-1
- Earnings: $3,543,392

Major wins
- Fort Lauderdale Stakes (2011); Canadian Turf Stakes (2011); Appleton Stakes (2011); Sunshine Millions Turf Stakes (2012); Turf Classic Stakes (2012); Arlington Million (2012); Joe Hirsch Turf Classic (2013) Breeders' Cup wins: Breeders' Cup Turf (2012)

Awards
- Florida-bred Horse of the Year (2012)
- Last updated on August 3, 2016

Little Mike (foaled May 24, 2007 in Florida) is an American Thoroughbred racehorse best known for winning the 2012 Breeders' Cup Turf.

== Background ==
Little Mike is a bay gelding bred by Carlo Vaccarezza, who immigrated to the United States from Italy in the 1960s. One of Vaccarezza's first jobs in America was as a groom at Aqueduct racetrack. He subsequently became involved in the restaurant industry and became the owner of two restaurants near Fort Lauderdale, Florida. In the mid-2000s, he obtained the mare Hay Jude from a friend, Pat Greco. Hay Jude's first foal, Little Nick by Tiger Ridge, became a multiple stakes winner for Vaccarezza. Hay Jude's second foal was Little Mike, sired by Spanish Steps, an unraced son of Unbridled with a modest stud fee of $5,000.

Little Mike was named after Vaccarezza's youngest son and owned by Carlo's wife Priscilla Vaccarezza. He was originally trained by William White, then Allen Iwinski in 2010, before being transferred to the barn of Dale Romans.

== Racing career ==
On July 11, 2009, Little Mike finished second in his racing debut in a 5-furlong maiden special weight race on the dirt at Calder Race Course, then lost his next three races, all sprint races on the dirt. Now trained by Allen Iwinski, Little Mike won for the first time after being switched to the turf in a one-mile race at Monmouth Park, leading the field from start to finish. He then won three allowance races and finished second in the Monarch's Maze Stakes, ending the year with a record of four wins from seven starts.

On January 9, 2011, at the age of four, Little Mike made his graded stakes debut in the Fort Lauderdale Stakes at 1 1/16 miles on the turf at Gulfstream Park. At odds of 12-1, he went to the early lead then battled down the stretch with Blues Street to win by a nose. He was then transferred to the stable of Dale Romans for the Gulfstream Park Turf Handicap on February 5, his first attempt at the Grade 1 level. After leading throughout most of the race, he gave way near the finish line and finished sixth. Three weeks later in the 1-mile Canadian Turf Stakes, Little Mike again went to the early lead and set solid opening fractions. He opened up a large lead turning into the stretch and this time was able to hold off some late challenges to win in an excellent time of 1:32.37. "As long as he's happy and flipping his ears around, how fast he's going doesn't really matter," said jockey Joe Bravo.

On April 3, Little Mike repeated his front-running tactics in the Appleton Stakes and won by 1 1/2 lengths, despite carrying the high-weight of 123 pounds. "I've never seen him get tired," Romans said. "Even though he didn't win the [Gulfstream Turf Handicap], he only got beat two lengths and that was a grade I. He has been just super. He came to me in great condition. It's pretty special for him to win three graded stakes at the meet."

Unfortunately, Little Mike then suffered a condylar fracture and missed the next eight months, returning on December 22 to win an allowance race. He finished 2011 with a record of four wins from five starts, all at Gulfstream Park.

Little Mike began 2012 with another wire to wire win at Gulfstream Park, this time in the Florida Sunshine Millions Turf at a distance of 1 1/8 miles. He then tried to repeat his earlier win in the Canadian Stakes but faded late in the stretch to finish fourth.

Little Mike then traveled to Churchill Downs for the Grade I Turf Classic on May 5, where he went off as a 12-1 longshot. He again set the early pace, then opened up a large lead turning into the stretch and won comfortably by 2 1/2 lengths. He then shipped to Hollywood Park for the Shoemaker Mile on June 30, finishing third.

Little Mike next traveled to Chicago to win the 10-furlong Arlington Million on August 18 with another front-running performance. Vaccarezza credited the win to Little Mike's tactical speed and stamina. "If you try to go with him on the lead, you can't stay with him and you're going to lose. And if you let him go like they did [in the Arlington Million], you're going to lose." Vaccarezza said. "Can you believe this? I'm just a backyard kind of guy and we took a Florida-bred horse that was out of an Illinois-bred mare and we took on the Europeans in one of the biggest races in the world and we beat them"

Little Mike's next start was on September 29 in the Joe Hirsch Turf Classic at a distance of 1 1/2 miles on a yielding turf course at Belmont Park. Little Mike went to the early lead but tired, eventually finishing well behind the winner Point of Entry in fifth.

Little Mike's final race of the year was the 1 1/2-mile Breeders' Cup Turf on November 3, run that year at Santa Anita Park. He was a 17-1 longshot, largely because he had never won at the distance. Instead of his usual front-running tactics, jockey Ramon Dominguez rated the gelding off the pace, moved to the lead entering the stretch, and then withstood a stretch drive from the favorite Point of Entry. Romans said, "He's an overachiever and he's proven us all wrong. I don't think anybody up here thought he could be more than a miler last year and now we don't know where his limit is." Little Mike's time was an exceptional 2:22.83, the fastest Breeders' Cup Turf ever and almost equal with the Santa Anita track record of 2:22 4/5. He became the first American horse to win both the Arlington Million and Breeders' Cup Turf in the same year.

Little Mike was named the 2012 Florida-bred Horse of the Year by the Florida Thoroughbred Breeders' and Owners' Association. His dam Hay Jude was also named the Florida broodmare of the year. Little Mike was a runner-up to Wise Dan in the Eclipse Award voting for Champion Turf Horse.

Little Mike began 2013 by shipping to Dubai to prepare for Dubai World Cup Day. In his first start on March 9, he competed on an artificial dirt surface at Meydan Racecourse, finishing eighth. He then finished tenth on March 30 in the Dubai Duty Free Stakes, in which he wrenched an ankle. Returning to the United States, he finished fourth in the United Nations in July, then sixth in the Secretariat Stakes in August. "His races this year haven’t been that bad, if you really analyze them," said Romans. "They were very bad set-ups, and he ran about as well as he could. Compare the difference between the Arlington Million between 2013 and '12. We went almost two seconds faster this year. They started respecting his speed a little more and went after him earlier."

Little Mike's sole victory of 2013 came in the Grade 1 Joe Hirsch Turf Classic at Belmont Park. He rated early, then moved to the lead around the far turn and withstood a late run to beat Big Blue Kitten by a nose. Romans said, "He just proved how versatile he is. I knew we needed to try something different to get him back to the level where he was last year." Little Mike ended the year by finishing seventh in the Breeders' Cup Turf and ninth in the Hong Kong Cup.

In 2014, Vaccarezza took over the training of Little Mike, and conditioned him to a win in the Flying Pidgeon Stakes at Gulfstream Park on May 17. Little Mike then was given a long layoff to deal with tendonitis, undergoing hyperbaric treatments and a swimming regimen. He finally returned to racing on July 10, 2016, but finished fifth. It would be his last race after accumulating 14 wins from 30 starts, with earnings of $3,543,392.

== Retirement ==
Little Mike was retired at the end of July 2016 to Old Friends Equine, a thoroughbred retirement home. "He came out of his race fine, but the last few days he just didn't seem to have the same energy level he has had when training these past weeks and months. He came back blowing yesterday after a routine gallop. He wasn't his usual rambunctious self, and kind of looked at me and told me it was over. The one thing I can say is that he retired 100 percent sound," said Vaccarezza. "He was everything to me and my family. To have a horse that won all those Grade 1's, who took me and my family around the world to meet so many people, it's like a dream come true."

"It's so thrilling to have him here," said Michael Blowen, the president of Old Friends. "I'm star-struck around all these horses and he fits right in with the best we have here."

== Pedigree ==
Pedigree of Little Mike, bay gelding, 2007
Sire Spanish Steps 2001	Unbridled; 1987	Fappiano	Mr. Prospector
Sire Spanish Steps 2001	Unbridled; 1987	Fappiano	Killaloe
Sire Spanish Steps 2001	Unbridled; 1987	Gana Facil	Le Fabuleux
Sire Spanish Steps 2001	Unbridled; 1987	Gana Facil	Charedi
Sire Spanish Steps 2001	Trolley Song; 1983	Caro	Fortino
Sire Spanish Steps 2001	Trolley Song; 1983	Caro	Chambord
Sire Spanish Steps 2001	Trolley Song; 1983	Lucky Spell	Lucky Mel
Sire Spanish Steps 2001	Trolley Song; 1983	Lucky Spell	Incantation
Dam Hay Jude 1995	Wavering Monarch; 1979	Majestic Light	Majestic Prince
Dam Hay Jude 1995	Wavering Monarch; 1979	Majestic Light	Irradiate
Dam Hay Jude 1995	Wavering Monarch; 1979	Uncommitted	Buckpasser
Dam Hay Jude 1995	Wavering Monarch; 1979	Uncommitted	Lady Be Good
Dam Hay Jude 1995	Double Norm; 1986	Relaunch	In Reality
Dam Hay Jude 1995	Double Norm; 1986	Relaunch	Foggy Note
Dam Hay Jude 1995	Double Norm; 1986	T.V. Spot	Explodent
Dam Hay Jude 1995	Double Norm; 1986	T.V. Spot	Rate Card (family: 8-f)

Little Mike is inbred 5S x 5D to Raise a Native, meaning Raise A Native appears in the fifth generation of the sire's side of the pedigree and in the fifth generation of the dam's side of the pedigree. Little Mike is also inbred 5S x 4D to In Reality.
