= Heart to Heart (horse) =

American thoroughbred racehorse

- Sire: English Channel
- Grandsire: Smart Strike
- Dam: Ask The Question
- Damsire: Silver Deputy
- Sex: Stallion
- Foaled: 2011
- Country: Canada
- Colour: Bay
- Breeder: Red Hawk Ranch
- Owner: Terry Hamilton
- Trainer: Brian A. Lynch
- Record: 41:15-6-4
- Earnings: $2,035,090

Major wins
- Better Talk Now Stakes (2014); Jefferson Cup Stakes (2014); Commonwealth Turf Stakes (2014); Oceanport Stakes (2015); River City Handicap (2015); Fort Lauderdale Stakes (2016); Canadian Turf Handicap (2016, 2017); Bernard Baruch Handicap (2017); Knickerbocker Handicap (2016); El Prado Stakes (2016); Gulfstream Park Turf Handicap (2018); Maker's Mark Mile Stakes (2018)

Awards
- Canadian Champion Three-Year-Old Colt (2014)

Honours
- Canadian Horse Racing Hall of Fame (2021)

Heart to Heart (foaled February 2, 2011) is a Canadian Thoroughbred racehorse and the winner of the 2018 Gulfstream Park Turf Handicap.

== Career ==
Heart to Heart's first race was on July 13, 2013, at Arlington, where he came in first. His next win did not come until April 9, 2014, when he won at Keeneland.

Heart to Heart went on a three race winstreak starting on August 20, 2014, when he won the Better Talk Now Stakes. He then won the Jefferson Cup Stakes on September 27, 2014. On November 15, 2014, he then won the Commonwealth Turf Stakes.

Heart to Heart picked up two stakes win during his 2015 season, when he won the August 2nd, 2015 Oceanport Stakes then the November 26th, 2015 River City Handicap.

In 2016, Heart to Heart started off with two wins. First, he won the January 9th, 2016 Fort Lauderdale Stakes. Then, in the following month he captured the February 27th, 2016 Canadian Turf Handicap. He finished off the season with an October 10 win at the Knickerbocker Handicap and a December 17, 2016 win at the El Prado Stakes.

He defended his Canadian Turf Handicap championship successfully, by winning the 2017 version of the race on March 4. He then won the September 4th, 2017 Bernard Baruch Handicap, which was his final win of 2017.

Heart to Heart captured the 2018 Gulfstream Park Turf Handicap on February 10, which was his first Grade-1 win. He then picked up another Grade-1 win in his next race when he won the Maker's Mark Mile Stakes on April 13, 2018. He finished in 2nd place at the Shoemaker Mile Stakes on May 28, 2018.

His 2019 season was mostly unsuccessful, as he only raced in 3 races and his best finish was a 3rd place finish at the January 12th, 2019 Tropical Turf Handicap.

Heart to Heart was then retired in 2019. In 2021 he was inducted into the Canadian Horse Racing Hall of Fame.

== Pedigree ==
Pedigree of Heart to Heart (CAN), 2011
Sire English Channel (USA) 2002	Smart Strike (CAN); 1992	Mr. Prospector	Raise a Native
Sire English Channel (USA) 2002	Smart Strike (CAN); 1992	Mr. Prospector	Gold Digger
Sire English Channel (USA) 2002	Smart Strike (CAN); 1992	Classy 'n Smart	Smarten
Sire English Channel (USA) 2002	Smart Strike (CAN); 1992	Classy 'n Smart	No Class
Sire English Channel (USA) 2002	Belva (USA); 1998	Theatrical	Nureyev
Sire English Channel (USA) 2002	Belva (USA); 1998	Theatrical	Tree of Knowledge
Sire English Channel (USA) 2002	Belva (USA); 1998	Committed	Hagley
Sire English Channel (USA) 2002	Belva (USA); 1998	Committed	Minstinguette
Dam Ask The Question (USA) 2003	Silver Deputy (CAN); 1985	Deputy Minister	Vice Regent
Dam Ask The Question (USA) 2003	Silver Deputy (CAN); 1985	Deputy Minister	Mint Copy
Dam Ask The Question (USA) 2003	Silver Deputy (CAN); 1985	Silver Valley	Mr. Prospector
Dam Ask The Question (USA) 2003	Silver Deputy (CAN); 1985	Silver Valley	Sevens Valleys
Dam Ask The Question (USA) 2003	Fair Advice (USA); 1987	Cozzene	Caro
Dam Ask The Question (USA) 2003	Fair Advice (USA); 1987	Cozzene	Ride The Trails
Dam Ask The Question (USA) 2003	Fair Advice (USA); 1987	Fair Astrologer	Quack
Dam Ask The Question (USA) 2003	Fair Advice (USA); 1987	Fair Astrologer	Fair Astronomer
