= Canadian Turf Stakes =

Horse race in Florida, United States

- Class: Grade III
- Location: Gulfstream Park; Hallandale Beach, Florida, United States
- Inaugurated: 1967 (as Canadian Turf Handicap)
- Race type: Thoroughbred – Flat racing
- Website: Gulfstream Park

Race information
- Distance: 1 1/16 miles
- Surface: Turf
- Track: Left-handed
- Qualification: Four-year-olds and older
- Weight: 124 lbs. with allowances
- Purse: $150,000 (since 2009)

The Canadian Turf Stakes is a Grade III American Thoroughbred horse race, by invitation for four-year-olds and older over a distance of one and one-sixteenth miles on the turf track, held annually in late February or early March at Gulfstream Park, Hallandale Beach, Florida. The event currently carries a purse of $150,000.

== History ==
The race was first run in 1967 and was named in recognition of the Canadian Centennial that was being celebrated that year by many Canadian racing fans who vacation in Florida during the winter months.

The 1990 Canadian Triple Crown champion and Horse of the Year, Izvestia, wintered in Florida and made his 1991 racing debut with a win in this race.

The race was downgraded to a listed race for 2005 and 2006 when it was restored to its Grade III status.

In 2005, Old Forester set a new Gulfstream Park turf course record for 1 1/16 miles in winning the Canadian Turf Handicap in a time of 1:38.20.

In 2009, the race was raced at a distance of one mile. It was run in two divisions in 1973, 1977, 1978, 1979, 1983, 1985, 1986, 1987.

== Records ==
Time record:

- 1 mile: 1:31.58 – Courageous Cat (2010)
- 1 1/16 miles: 1:38.07 – Tiz Dashing (2026)
- 1 1/8 miles: 1:38.20 – Devil's Cup (1997)

Margins:

- 6 lengths – Jungle Cove (1970), Super Sunrise (1983), The Vid (1995)

Most wins by an owner:

- 3 – WinStar Farm (2012, 2023, 2024)

Most wins:

- 2 – Equalize (1988, 1989)
- 2 – The Vid (1995, 1996)
- 2 - Heart To Heart (2016, 2017)
- 2 - Emmanuel (2023, 2024)

Most wins by a jockey:

- 6 – Jerry Bailey (1977, 1985, 1988, 1993, 1995, 1998)

Most wins by a trainer:

- 7 – Todd A. Pletcher (2004, 2006, 2009, 2012, 2020, 2023, 2024)

== Winners ==
Year	Winner	Age	Jockey	Trainer	Owner	Distance	Time	Purse	Grade	Ref
Canadian Turf Stakes
2026	Tiz Dashing	4	Javier Castellano	Barclay Tagg	Sackatoga Stable	1 1/16 miles	1:38.07	$150,000	III	
2025	Fort Washington	6	Junior Alvarado	Claude R. McGaughey III	Magic Cap Stables	1 1/16 miles	1:39.31	$150,000	III	
2024	Emmanuel	5	Irad Ortiz Jr.	Todd A. Pletcher	WinStar Farm and Siena Farm	1 1/16 miles	1:39.04	$150,000	III	
2023	Emmanuel	4	Javier Castellano	Todd A. Pletcher	WinStar Farm and Siena Farm	1 1/16 miles	1:40.31	$150,000	III	
2022	Mira Mission	4	Julien R. Leparoux	Ian R. Wilkes	Mary Abeel Sullivan Revocable Trust	abt. 1 1/16 miles	1:41.43	$150,000	III	
2021	Venezuelan Hug	4	Junior Alvarado	Danny Gargan	Spedale Family Racing & R. A. Hill Stable	1 1/16 miles	1:40.42	$125,000	III	
2020	Sombeyay	4	Flavien Prat	Todd A. Pletcher	Starlight Racing	1 mile	1:32.44	$150,000	III	
2019	Krampus	5	John R. Velazquez	William I. Mott	William Schettine	1 mile	1:34.98	$150,000	III	
2018	Hogy	9	Irad Ortiz Jr.	Michael J. Maker	Michael M. Hui	1 mile	1:32.11	$150,000	III	
2017	Heart to Heart	6	Julien R. Leparoux	Brian A. Lynch	Terry Hamilton	1 mile	1:32.63	$150,000	III	
2016	Heart to Heart	5	Julien R. Leparoux	Brian A. Lynch	Terry Hamilton	1 mile	1:33.52	$150,000	III	
2015	Long On Value	4	Joel Rosario	William I. Mott	Wachtel Stable & George J. Kerr	1 mile	1:34.26	$150,000	III	
2014	Reload	5	Javier Castellano	Claude R. McGaughey III	Phipps Stable	1 mile	1:32.34	$150,000	III	
2013	Data Link	5	Javier Castellano	Claude R. McGaughey III	Stuart S. Janney III	1 mile	1:33.01	$150,000	III	
2012	Doubles Partner	5	Julien R. Leparoux	Todd A. Pletcher	WinStar Farm	1 mile	1:32.56	$150,000	III	
2011	Little Mike	4	Joe Bravo	Dale L. Romans	Priscilla Vaccarezza	1 mile	1:32.37	$150,000	III	
2010	Courageous Cat	4	Garrett K. Gomez	William I. Mott	Pam & Martin Wygod	1 mile	1:31.58	$150,000	III	
2009	Twilight Meteor	5	John R. Velazquez	Todd A. Pletcher	Peachtree Stable	1 mile	1:34.31	$150,000	III	
Canadian Turf Handicap
2008	Host (CHI)	8	John R. Velazquez	Thomas Albertrani	Melnyk Racing Stables	1 1/16 miles	1:39.85	$100,000	III	
2007	Giant Wrecker	5	Javier Castellano	Mark A. Hennig	Edward P. Evans	1 1/16 miles	1:39.70	$100,000	III	
2006	English Channel	4	John R. Velazquez	Todd A. Pletcher	James T. Scatuorchio	1 1/16 miles	1:39.13	$100,000	Listed	
2005	Old Forester	4	Eibar Coa	William I. Mott	Live Oak Plantation	1 1/16 miles	1:38.20	$100,000	Listed	
2004	Newfoundland	4	John R. Velazquez	Todd A. Pletcher	Sumaya Us Stable	1 1/16 miles	1:44.90	$100,000	III	Off turf
2003	Political Attack	4	Mark Guidry	Michael R. Matz	Fitz Eugene Dixon Jr.	1 1/16 miles	1:40.43	$100,000	III	
2002	North East Bound	6	Jose A. Velez Jr.	William W. Perry	Julian Demarco, Richard J. Disano	1 1/16 miles	1:44.01	$145,500	III	Off turf
2001	Inexplicable	6	Jose A. Santos	Christophe Clement	Lucy Young-Boutin	1 1/16 miles	1:39.43	$150,000	III	
2000	Shamrock City	5	Edgar S. Prado	Mohammed Moubarak	Buckram Oak Farm	1 1/8 miles	1:47.15	$100,000	III	
1999	Federal Trial	4	Robbie Davis	Louis M. Goldfine	Arthur I. Appleton	1 1/8 miles	1:47.90	$100,000	III	
1998	Subordination	4	Jerry D. Bailey	Gary Sciacca	Klaravich Stables	1 1/8 miles	1:50.87	$100,000	III	Off turf
1997	Devil's Cup	4	Rick Wilson	John C. Kimmel	Gold Spur Stable	1 1/8 miles	1:47.01	$100,000	II	
1996	The Vid	6	Herb McCauley	Martin D. Wolfson	Joseph J. Sullivan	1 1/8 miles	1:47.05	$100,000	II	
1995	The Vid	5	Jerry D. Bailey	Martin D. Wolfson	Joseph J. Sullivan	1 1/8 miles	1:47.19	$100,000	II	
1994	Paradise Creek	5	Mike E. Smith	William I. Mott	Bertram R. Firestone	1 1/8 miles	1:47.80	$100,000	II	
1993	Stagecraft (GB)	6	Jerry D. Bailey	William I. Mott	Darley Stud Management	1 1/8 miles	1:47.80	$100,000	II	
1992	Buckhar	4	Jean Cruguet	Willard C. Freeman	John W. Meriwether	1 1/8 miles	1:48.49	$100,000	II	
1991	Izvestia (CAN)	4	Robin Platts	Roger L. Attfield	Kinghaven Farms	1 1/16 miles	1:41.50	$100,000	II	
1990	Youmadeyourpoint	4	Douglas Valiente	Eugene Navarro	Stanley M. Ersoff	1 1/16 miles	1:44.60	$100,000	II	Off turf
1989	Equalize	7	Jose A. Santos	Angel Penna Sr.	A. J. Menditeguy Stable	1 1/16 miles	1:41.00	$118,800	II	
1988	Equalize	6	Jerry D. Bailey	Angel Penna Sr.	A. J. Menditeguy Stable	1 1/16 miles	1:41.20	$154,500	II	
1987	Racing Star	5	Santiago B. Soto	Manuel A. Estevez	Five Star Stable	1 1/16 miles	1:40.80	$103,290	II	Division 1
1987	New Colony	4	Victor H. Molina	Charles R. Stutts	Silver Meadow Racing Stable	1 1/16 miles	1:42.00	$94,850	II	Division 2
1986	Amerilad	5	Jose A. Velez Jr.	Edward J. Yowell	October House Farm	1 1/16 miles	1:40.20	$98,475	II	Division 1
1986	Vanlandingham	5	Donald MacBeth	Claude R. McGaughey III	Loblolly Stable	1 1/16 miles	1:40.00	$107,600	II	Division 2
1985	Nepal	5	Jerry D. Bailey	Thomas J. Skiffington	Mandysland Farm	1 1/16 miles	1:40.00	$102,350	II	Division 1
1985	Solidified	4	Jean Cruguet	Frank Martin Sr.	Harbor View Farm	1 1/16 miles	1:40.60	$103,350	II	Division 2
1984	Ayman	4	Jean Cruguet	Howard M. Tesher	Steven & Gary Wolfson	1 1/16 miles	1:40.00	$95,925	III	
1983	Data Swap	6	Mickey Solomone	Mary L. Edens	Mrs. Henry D. Paxton	1 1/16 miles	1:47.20	$70,175	III	Division 1
1983	Super Sunrise (GB)	4	Eddie Maple	Michael J. Doyle	Jeff Maxwell	1 1/16 miles	1:46.60	$68,675	III	Division 2
1982	Robsphere	5	Don Brumfield	Richard R. Root	Harry T. Mangurian Jr.	1 1/16 miles	1:41.00	$66,150	III	
1981	Proctor	4	Craig Perret	Frank A. Alexander	Dogwood Stable	1 1/16 miles	1:41.00	$102,150	III	
1980	Morning Frolic	5	Angel Cordero Jr.	Stephen A. DiMauro	Mrs. Philip J. Davidson	1 1/16 miles	1:41.20	$68,700	III	
1979	Roan Star	6	Craig Perret	Leonard Imperio	Buckram Oak Stable	1 1/16 miles	1:40.80	$52,650	III	Division 1
1979	Noble Dancer II (GB)	7	Jacinto Vasquez	Thomas J. Kelly	Haakon Fretheim	1 1/16 miles	1:41.00	$52,150	III	Division 2
1978	Practitioner	5	Jay S. Rodriguez	Leo Sierra	Dogwood Stable	1 1/16 miles	1:41.60	$49,700	III	Division 1
1978	Court Open	4	Robert Woodhouse	Bill P. Kelley	Daybreak Farm	1 1/16 miles	1:40.80	$49,200	III	Division 2
1977	Gravelines (FR)	5	Jerry D. Bailey	Neal J. Winick	Maribel G. Blum & Mrs. Robert Harpenau	1 1/16 miles	1:44.40	$55,700	III	Division 1
1977	Gay Jitterbug	4	Larry Saumell	Jimmy Croll	Jaclyn Stable	1 1/16 miles	1:44.00	$54,700	III	Division 2
1976	Step Forward	4	Mickey Solomone	Charles P. Sanborn	Hough A. Grant	1 1/16 miles	1:40.20	$67,200	III	
1975	Sir Jason	4	Miguel A. Rivera	Laz S. Barrera	Harbor View Farm	1 1/16 miles	1:40.80	$51,125	III	
1974	Baccalaureate (CAN)	4	Robert Woodhouse	Jack R. Hogan	Jack R. Hogan	1 1/16 miles	1:42.20	$73,000	III	
1973	Windtex	4	John L. Rotz	George Zatalos	Sol Epstein	1 1/16 miles	1:41.40	$39,725	III	Division 1
1973	Life Cycle	4	Frank Iannelli	Robert J. Frankel	Peter E. Blum	1 1/16 miles	1:42.80	$39,025	III	Division 2
1972	Speedy Zephyr (CAN)	4	Ron Turcotte	Leslie Lear	Charles I. Rathgeb Jr.	1 1/16 miles	1:43.60	$72,600		Off turf
1971	Brokers Tip II (NZ)	6	Michael Hole	Arnold N. Winick	Maribel G. Blum	1 1/16 miles	1:41.80	$52,175		
1970	Jungle Cove	4	Larry Adams	Woodford C. Stephens	James Cox Brady	1 1/16 miles	1:52.80	$48,650		
1969	Go Marching	4	Manuel Ycaza	Horatio A. Luro	Warner L. Jones Jr.	1 1/16 miles	1:43.80	$36,550		
1968	War Censor	5	Earlie Fires	S. Bryant Ott	Fourth Estate Stables	1 1/16 miles	1:41.20	$36,150		Dead heat
1968	§ Flit-To	5	Jacinto Vasquez	Jim P. Conway	Robert Lehman	1 1/16 miles	1:41.20	$36,150		Dead heat
1967	Chinatowner	5	Heliodoro Gustines	John A. Nerud	Tartan Stable	1 1/16 miles	1:41.20	$33,000		

Legend:
Turf Dirt
Notes:
§ Ran as an entry

== See also ==
- List of American and Canadian Graded races
