= Gravelines (horse) =

French-bred Thoroughbred racehorse

- Sire: Cadmus
- Grandsire: Supreme Court
- Dam: Gray Dove
- Damsire: T V Lark
- Sex: Stallion
- Foaled: 1972
- Country: France
- Colour: Grey
- Breeder: Dayton Ltd
- Owner: Daniel Wildenstein; Maribel G. Blum & Mrs. Robert Harpinau
- Trainer: Angel Penna, Sr. Neal Winick
- Record: 18: 10-4-1

Major wins
- Prix du Palais-Royal (1976); Prix Jacques le Marois (1976); Prix du Moulin (1976); Canadian Turf Handicap (1977); Pan American Handicap (1977)

Awards
- Timeform rating 130 (1976); Top-rated French miler (1976)

Gravelines (1972 – 30 April 1977) was a French-bred Thoroughbred racehorse. Unraced as a juvenile, he won three minor races as a three-year-old in 1975, but was beaten when tried in higher class. In 1976, he made significant improvement, winning the Prix du Palais-Royal, Prix Jacques le Marois and Prix du Moulin and ending the year as one of the highest rated horses in Europe. He was moved to the United States in 1977 where he won the Canadian Turf Handicap and the Pan American Handicap before being fatally injured in the Hialeah Turf Cup Handicap.

== Background ==
Gravelines was a grey horse bred in France by Dayton Ltd, a breeding company owned by the French art dealer Daniel Wildenstein. He was by far the best horse sired by Cadmus, a British-bred stallion who recorded his most significant wins in the Prix La Force in 1966 and the Prix d'Harcourt in 1967. Cadmus had little success as a breeding stallion in Europe and was sold and exported to Japan. Gravelines' dam Gray Dove was a full-sister of Pink Pigeon, who won the Santa Barbara Handicap in 1969. Wildenstein sent his colt into training in France with the Argentinian Angel Penna, Sr.

== Racing career ==
=== 1975: three-year-old season ===
Unraced as a two-year-old, Gravelines made his debut in the summer of 1975, winning minor races over 1600 metres and 1500 metres. He was then moved up in class for the Prix Messidor over 1600 metres on 24 July at Deauville Racecourse. Ridden by Robert Jallu, he started at odds of 15/1 and finished out of the first ten in a race won by Son of Silver. After another minor win he contested the Group Three Prix du Pin over 1400 metres at Longchamp Racecourse in September and finished unplaced behind Northern Taste.

=== 1976: four-year-old season ===
Gravelines began the 1976 season by winning a minor event at Saint-Cloud Racecourse in February. He continued to compete in second-class races, finishing second to Lanargo at Saint-Cloud and winning over 1800 metres. On 30 May, the colt was moved up in class for the Prix du Palais-Royal over 1400 metres at Longchamp. In France, horses in the same ownership are coupled for betting purposes and Gravelines was made 5/2 second favourite together with his more highly regarded stablemate Monsanto, who had been runner-up to Grundy in the Irish 2000 Guineas. Ridden by Yves Saint-Martin, the grey colt recorded his first major victory, beating Girl Friend by two lengths, with Monsanto in third. In his next two races, Gravelines finished second to Full of Hope in the Prix du Chemin de Fer du Nord at Chantilly Racecourse and third behind Dona Barod and Monsanto in the Prix Messidor at Maisons-Laffitte Racecourse.

On 8 August at Deauville, Gravelines was moved up to Group One level for the first time for the Prix Jacques le Marois. He was coupled in the betting with his stablemate El Rastro and started 2/1 favourite against twelve opponents including Full of Hope, Vitiges, Manado, Donna Barod, Girl Friend and the St James's Palace Stakes winner Radetzky. With Yves Saint-Martin opting to partner El Rastro, Gravelines was ridden by the Australian jockey Gary Moore. The race produced a blanket finish, with the first seven home covered by less than a length, but Gravelines prevailed by a head from Radetzky and Vitiges, who dead-heated for second, with Manado, Ellora, Avaray and El Rastro just behind. After a break of seven weeks, Gravelines returned for the Group One Prix du Moulin at Longchamp on 26 September. With Saint-Martin resuming the ride, the grey colt started 7/10 favourite, coupled with Monsanto and the Prix Jean Prat winner Earth Spirit, against a field which included Avaray, Manado, Ellora, Son of Silver and Dona Barod. Gravelines accelerated impressively in the straight and won easily by two and a half lengths from Dona Barod with Manado in third.

In early October, Gravelines was offered for sale at the Polo Club sale in Paris and was bought for ₣950,000 by representatives of Maribel G. Blum & Mrs. Robert Harpinau.

=== 1977: five-year-old season ===
In 1977, Gravelines was transferred to the United States, where he was trained by Neal Winick. On his first appearance for his new connections, Gravelines finished second in an allowance race at Gulfstream Park on February 4. Fifteen days later, the horse contested the Grade III Canadian Turf Handicap over eight and a half furlongs and won from Proponent and Lord Layabout. On March 5 was moved up in clas and distance for the Grade II Pan American Handicap over one and a half miles, in which he was ridden by Jerry Bailey and won by more than six lengths in a track record time from Le Cypriote and Gay Jitterbug. On his next appearance, he moved to Hialeah Park and finished second to All Friends in the Grade III Bougainvillea Handicap on April 2. Four weeks later, at the same course, Gravelines was fatally injured in the Hialeah Turf Cup Handicap. Ridden by the sixteen-year-old Steve Cauthen the horse broke his right front ankle approaching the final turn and was euthanised shortly after the race. After the race an emotional Cauthen said "I started to make my move when he gave out. He dropped his left front leg and went right to his rear end, That's when he broke down. I pulled him off and then jumped off him."

== Assessment and awards ==
In 1976, the independent Timeform organisation awarded Gravelines a rating of 130, two pounds behind their best miler Wollow, and three behind the top-rated older horse Trepan. In the French handicap for 1976 he was rated the third-best horse of the year behind the middle-distance runners Ivanjica and Ashmore.

== Pedigree ==
Pedigree of Gravelines, grey horse, 1972
Sire Cadmus (GB) 1963	Supreme Court (GB); 1948	Precipitation	Hurry On
Sire Cadmus (GB) 1963	Supreme Court (GB); 1948	Precipitation	Double Life
Sire Cadmus (GB) 1963	Supreme Court (GB); 1948	Forecourt	Fair Trial
Sire Cadmus (GB) 1963	Supreme Court (GB); 1948	Forecourt	Overture
Sire Cadmus (GB) 1963	Covert Side (GB); 1958	Abernant	Owen Tudor
Sire Cadmus (GB) 1963	Covert Side (GB); 1958	Abernant	Rustom Mahal
Sire Cadmus (GB) 1963	Covert Side (GB); 1958	Cub Hunt	Foxhunter
Sire Cadmus (GB) 1963	Covert Side (GB); 1958	Cub Hunt	Knights Daughter
Dam Gray Dove (USA) 1966	T V Lark (USA); 1957	Indian Hemp	Nasrullah
Dam Gray Dove (USA) 1966	T V Lark (USA); 1957	Indian Hemp	Sabzy
Dam Gray Dove (USA) 1966	T V Lark (USA); 1957	Miss Larksfly	Heelfly
Dam Gray Dove (USA) 1966	T V Lark (USA); 1957	Miss Larksfly	Larksnest
Dam Gray Dove (USA) 1966	Ruwenzori (USA); 1956	Oil Capitol	Mahmoud
Dam Gray Dove (USA) 1966	Ruwenzori (USA); 1956	Oil Capitol	Never Again
Dam Gray Dove (USA) 1966	Ruwenzori (USA); 1956	Ruanda	Alibhai
Dam Gray Dove (USA) 1966	Ruwenzori (USA); 1956	Ruanda	Foxy Tetra (Family: 3-o)
