= Eye of the Leopard (horse) =

Canadian-bred Thoroughbred racehorse

- Sire: A.P. Indy
- Grandsire: Seattle Slew
- Dam: Eye of the Sphynx
- Damsire: Smart Strike
- Sex: Stallion
- Foaled: 2006
- Country: Canada
- Colour: Bay
- Breeder: Sam-Son Farm
- Owner: Sam-Son Farm
- Trainer: Mark Frostad
- Record: 5: 3–0–1
- Earnings: Can$722,078

Major wins
- Plate Trial Stakes (2009); Canadian Classic Race wins: Queen's Plate (2009)

Awards
- Sovereign Award for Champion 3-Year-Old Male Horse (2009)

Eye of the Leopard (foaled March 2, 2006, in Ontario) is a Canadian thoroughbred racehorse who, on June 21, 2009, won Canada's most prestigious race, the Queen's Plate.

Called a "big goof" by his trainer, Eye of the Leopard was a late developer and did not race at age two. In early 2009, he suffered from a respiratory infection that further hampered his development. He made his first start in April 2009 at Keeneland Race Course in Lexington, Kentucky, finishing third to last. He was then sent to his homebase at Woodbine Racetrack in Toronto, where he won his first race on May 10. He followed up with a win in the May 31 Plate Trial Stakes before capturing the 150th running of the Queen's Plate.

On July 12, 2009, the colt finished 3rd in the 74th Prince of Wales Stakes. Drawing chute 5, he rallied to finish third behind Gallant and Milwaukee Appeal.

Pedigree of Eye of the Leopard
Sire A.P. Indy	Seattle Slew	Bold Reasoning	Boldnesian
Sire A.P. Indy	Seattle Slew	Bold Reasoning	Reason To Learn
Sire A.P. Indy	Seattle Slew	My Charmer	Poker
Sire A.P. Indy	Seattle Slew	My Charmer	Fair Charmer
Sire A.P. Indy	Weekend Surprise	Secretariat	Bold Ruler
Sire A.P. Indy	Weekend Surprise	Secretariat	Somethingroyal
Sire A.P. Indy	Weekend Surprise	Lassie Dear	Buckpasser
Sire A.P. Indy	Weekend Surprise	Lassie Dear	Gay Missile
Dam Eye of the Sphynx	Smart Strike	Mr. Prospector	Raise a Native
Dam Eye of the Sphynx	Smart Strike	Mr. Prospector	Gold Digger
Dam Eye of the Sphynx	Smart Strike	Classy 'n Smart	Smarten
Dam Eye of the Sphynx	Smart Strike	Classy 'n Smart	No Class
Dam Eye of the Sphynx	Queen of Egypt	Vice Regent	Northern Dancer
Dam Eye of the Sphynx	Queen of Egypt	Vice Regent	Victoria Regina
Dam Eye of the Sphynx	Queen of Egypt	Forleana	Forum
Dam Eye of the Sphynx	Queen of Egypt	Forleana	Oleana
