= Appleton Stakes =

- Class: Listed
- Location: Gulfstream Park; Hallandale Beach, Florida, United States
- Inaugurated: 1952
- Race type: Thoroughbred – Flat racing
- Website: www.gulfstreampark.com

Race information
- Distance: 1 mile
- Surface: Turf
- Track: Left-handed
- Qualification: Three-year-olds & up
- Weight: 124 lbs. with allowances
- Purse: US$150,000 (2023)

The Appleton Stakes is an American Thoroughbred horse race held annually near the end of March at Gulfstream Park in Hallandale Beach, Florida. A Listed event raced on turf at a distance of 1 mile, it is open to horses age four and older.

== Race history ==
The race was run in two divisions in 1969, 1971, 1972, 1973–1982, 1984–1985, and 1987.

=== Race distance ===
- 1952- 1 1/16 mile
- 1953–1964 – 1 1/8 mile
- 1965–1966 – 7 furlongs
- 1967–1971 – 1 mile
- 1972 – 7 furlongs
- 1973–1982 – 1 mile
- 1983 – 7 furlongs
- 1984–1990 – 1 mile
- 1991 – 1 mile and 70 yards
- 1992–2000 – 1 1/16 mile
- 2001–2008 – 1 mile
- 2009–2010 – 7 1/2 furlongs
- 2011 onwards – 1 mile

== Records ==
Most wins:

- 2 – Better Bee (1958, 1959)

== Winners since 1999 ==
Year	Winner	Age	Jockey	Trainer	Owner	Time
2020	Social Paranoia	4	Florent Geroux	Todd Pletcher	The Elkstone Group LLC	1:32.81
2019	Dr. Edgar	6	Julien Leparoux	Barclay Tagg	Peter & Eloise Canzone	1:34.65
2018	no race held					
2017	All Included	6	Javier Castellano	Todd Pletcher	Wertheimer et Frère	1:33.12
2016	Reporting Star	6	Luis Saez	Brendan P. Walsh	Merriebelle Stable	1:35.52
2015	War Correspondent	5	John R. Velazquez	Christophe Clement	Eclipse Thoroughbred Partners	1:34.81
2014	Hey Leroy	4	Alex O. Solis	Manuel J. Azpurua	Rontos Racing Stable	1:32.49
2013	Za Approval	5	Jose Lezcano	Christophe Clement	Live Oak Plantation	1:33.99
2012	Corporate Jungle	4	Javier Castellano	Chad Brown	Mary & Gary West Racing Stables	1:33.99
2011	Little Mike	4	Joe Bravo	Dale Romans	Priscilla Vaccarezza	1:32.87
2010	Society's Chairman	7	Jose Lezcano	Roger Attfield	Charles E. Fipke	1:27.79
2009	Kiss The Kid	5	Elvis Trujillo	Amy Tarrant	Hardacre Farm	1:28.01
2008	Buffalo Man	4	Edgar Prado	Cam Gambolati	Ol Memorial Stable	1:34.86
2007	Silver Tree	7	Edgar Prado	William I. Mott	Peter Vegso	1:32.12
2006	Gulch Approval	6	Roberto Alvarado Jr.	Reynaldo Abreu	Marylou Whitney	1:32.80
2005	Mr. Light	6	Cornelio Velásquez	Angel Penna Jr.	Earle I. Mack	1:32.98
2004	Millennium Dragon	5	Richard Migliore	Kiaran McLaughlin	Darley Racing	1:34.40
2003	Point Prince	4	Manoel Cruz	Dale L. Romans	Team Valor	1:37.84
2002	Pisces	5	Roger Velez	Mohammed Moubarak	Diamond C Stable	1:39.41
2001	Associate	6	Jorge F. Chavez	Leslie Weiner	James Orr Jr.	1:33.69
2000	Band Is Passing	4	Eibar Coa	Stanley M. Ersoff	Stanley M. Ersoff	1:40.11
1999	Behaviour	7	Shane Sellers	Martin D. Wolfson	David Feldman	1:45.77

== Earlier winners ==
- 1998 – Sir Cat
- 1997 – Montjoy
- 1996 – The Vid
- 1995 – Dusty Screen
- 1994 – Paradise Creek
- 1993 – Cigar Toss
- 1992 – Royal Ninja
- 1991 – Jolies Halo
- 1990 – Highland Springs
- 1989 – Fabulous Indian
- 1988 – Yankee Affair
- 1987 – Regal Flier
- 1987 – Racing Star
- 1986 – Cool
- 1985 – Smart And Sharp
- 1985 – Star Choice
- 1984 – Super Sunrise
- 1984 – Great Substance
- 1983 – Northrop
- 1982 – Gleaming Channel
- 1982 – King of Mardi Gras
- 1981 – North Course
- 1981 – Drums Captain
- 1980 – Morning Frolic
- 1980 – Pipedreamer
- 1979 – Fleet Gar
- 1979 – Regal And Royal
- 1978 – Do Lishus
- 1978 – Qui Native
- 1977 – Gay Jitterbug
- 1977 – Cinteelo
- 1976 – Step Forward
- 1976 – Improviser
- 1975 – Duke Tom
- 1975 – Beau Bugle
- 1974 – Right On
- 1973 – Windtex
- 1973 – Life Cycle
- 1972 – No No Billy
- 1972 – Mr. Pow Wow
- 1971 – Rocky Mount
- 1971 – Brokers Tip
- 1970 – Prevailing
- 1969 – Quite An Accent
- 1969 – Go Marching
- 1968 – Rego
- 1967 – Canal
- 1966 – Pollux
- 1965 – Ampose
- 1964 – Frankies Nod
- 1963 – Key Issue
- 1962 – Beau Purple
- 1961 – Tudor Way
- 1960 – Oligarchy
- 1959 – Better Bee
- 1958 – Better Bee
- 1957 – Bardstown
- 1956 – Mielleux
- 1955 – Fly Wheel
- 1954 – Dr. Stanley
- 1953 – Battlefield
- 1952 – Alerted

== See also ==
- Arthur I. Appleton
