= A Bit O'Gold =

Canadian Thoroughbred racehorse

- Sire: Gold Fever
- Grandsire: Forty Niner
- Dam: Annasan
- Damsire: Corporate Report
- Sex: Gelding
- Foaled: 2001
- Country: Canada
- Colour: Chestnut
- Breeder: Beclawat Stable
- Owner: The Two Bit Racing Stable
- Trainer: Catherine Day Phillips
- Record: 18: 10-3-2
- Earnings: $1,888,155

Major wins
- Coronation Futurity (2003); Plate Trial Stakes (2004); Ontario Derby (2004); Dominion Day Handicap (2005); Chinese Cultural Centre Stakes (2005); Sky Classic Handicap (2005) Canadian Classic Race wins: Prince of Wales Stakes (2004); Breeders' Stakes (2004)

Awards
- Canadian Champion 3-Year-Old Male Horse (2004); Canadian Champion Older Male Horse (2005); Canadian Champion Male Turf Horse (2005); Canadian Horse of the Year (2005)

A Bit O'Gold (foaled 2001 in Ontario) is a Canadian Thoroughbred Champion racehorse.

== Background ==
A Bit O'Gold was sired by Grade I winner Gold Fever, a son of the 1987 American Champion Two-Year-Old Colt, Forty Niner, out of the mare, Annasan,

== Racing career ==
Equally effective racing on both dirt and grass, A Bit O'Gold began racing at age two in 2003 for owner/trainer Catherine Day Phillips. He won his first three starts, including the important Coronation Futurity Stakes in early November. At age three, the gelding won two of the three races comprising the Canadian Triple Crown series. After winning the Plate Trial, A Bit O'Gold finished second in the Queen's Plate, then won the Prince of Wales Stakes and on turf, the third leg of the Triple Crown, the Breeders' Stakes. A Bit O'Gold's 2004 performances earned him the Sovereign Award for Champion 3-Year-Old Male Horse.

At age four, A Bit O'Gold won important Canadian races on dirt and on grass that resulted in three Sovereign Awards, including for Canadian Horse of the Year.

== Retirement ==
In May 2006, A Bit O'Gold was retired to Kingfield Farms in Maple, Ontario.
