= Paradise Creek (horse) =

American-bred Thoroughbred racehorse

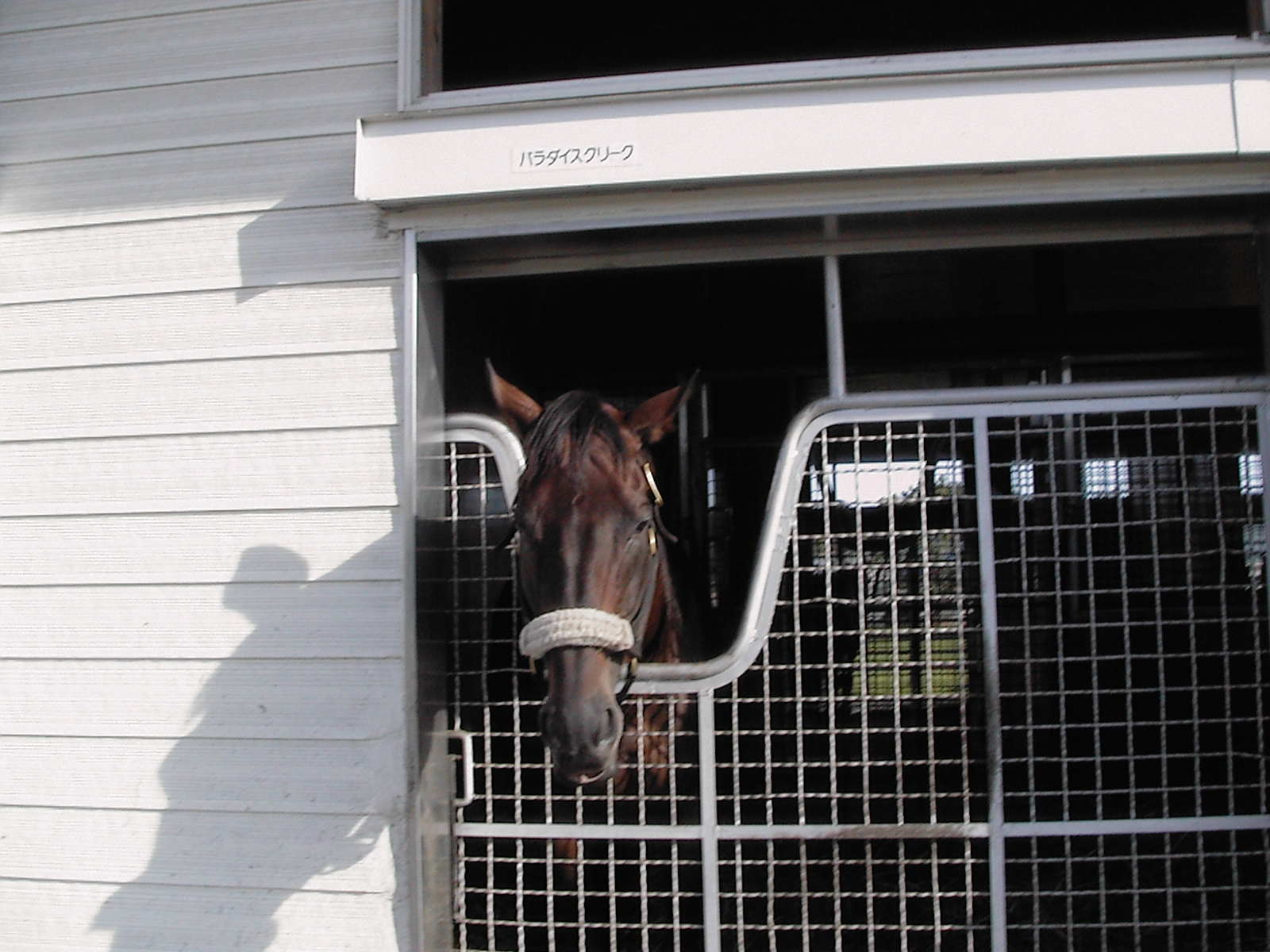
- Sire: Irish River
- Grandsire: Riverman
- Dam: North of Eden
- Damsire: Northfields
- Sex: Stallion
- Foaled: 1989
- Country: United States
- Colour: Dark Brown
- Breeder: Bertram R. Firestone
- Owner: Bertram R. Firestone
- Trainer: William I. Mott
- Record: 25: 14-7-1
- Earnings: US$$3,401,415

Major wins
- Washington, D.C. International Stakes(1994); Arlington Million (1994); Manhattan Handicap (1994); Dixie Handicap (1994); Turf Classic Stakes (1994); Canadian Turf Handicap (1994); Appleton Handicap (1994); Fort Lauderdale Handicap (1994); Hollywood Derby (1992); National Museum of Racing Hall of Fame Stakes (1992)

Awards
- American Champion Male Turf Horse (1994)

Paradise Creek (1989–2011) was a millionaire American Thoroughbred racehorse and successful sire. He was bred in Kentucky by Bertram R. Firestone and raced under the same Firestone banner as his owner. He finished racing with a record of 14-7-1 in 25 starts with career earnings of $3,401,415. Paradise Creek was best known for his wins in the grade one Washington, D.C. International Stakes and the grade one Arlington Million. In 1994 he became the only horse ever to have won both prestigious turf races of the United States.

== Three-year-old season ==
Paradise Creek won the grade one Hollywood Derby and the grade two National Museum of Racing Hall of Fame Stakes at age three. He placed second in the grade one Secretariat Stakes at Arlington Park in August and then later the Palisaides Breeders' Cup Handicap.

Paradise Creek entered the 1992 grade one Breeders' Cup Mile as the third longest shot in a field of 14 turf specialists at 31–1. Paradise Creek rallied outside horses entering the stretch and held off the charge of many late closers. Despite the three length loss to dual cup winner Lure, he beat many graded stakes winners including Brief Truce by a neck, Arazi, and Fourstars Allstar.

== Four-year-old season ==
At age four, Paradise Creek was injured and raced very little. That year (1993) he placed second to turf superstar Lure in the grade three Kelso Handicap in September at Belmont Park. Then he traveled to the west coast and placed second again in the grade two Citation Handicap to Jeune Homme at Hollywood Park in November.

== Five-year-old season ==
In 1994, Paradise Creek won the grade one Arlington Million, the grade one Washington, D.C. International Stakes, the grade one Manhattan Handicap, the grade two Turf Classic Stakes, the grade two Dixie Handicap, the grade two Canadian Turf Handicap, the grade three Appleton Handicap and the listed Fort Lauderdale Handicap. He also placed second in the grade two Bernard Baruch Handicap and the group one Japan Cup.

In the 1994 $2,000,000 grade one Breeders' Cup Turf, Paradise Creek entered the race as the prohibitive odds-on favorite. Jockey Pat Day had him press the pace from the onset, sitting in a very close stalking position at fourth behind leader Dahlia's Dreamer. At the halfway point in the race, Paradise Creek cleared the field by a head just before the mile mark. Speeding by natural sprinters Raintap and Vaudeville, he continued to lead after a mile and quarter but tired late, holding on to third. Tikkanen moved ahead to win the race by 1 1/2 lengths at odds of almost 17–1.

== Retirement ==
Paradise Creek was sold to a Japanese breeding syndicate in 1995 and stood in Japan that first year. He stood at Arrow Stud in Japan and his 2009 stud fee was ¥200,000. He died on April 4, 2011, at Arrow Stud. His most notable offspring is the two-year-old filly, TM Precure.
