= River City Stakes =

- Class: Grade III
- Location: Churchill Downs; Louisville, Kentucky, United States
- Inaugurated: 1978 (as River City Handicap)
- Race type: Thoroughbred - Flat racing
- Website: Churchill Downs

Race information
- Distance: 1 1/8 miles
- Surface: Turf
- Track: Left-handed
- Qualification: Three-year-olds and older
- Weight: Base weights with allowances: 4-year-olds and up: 125 lbs. 3-year-olds: 122 lbs.
- Purse: $300,000 (2022)

The River City Stakes is a Grade III American thoroughbred horse race for horses age three and older over a distance of one and one eighth miles on the turf held annually in November at Churchill Downs in Louisville, Kentucky. The event offers a purse of $300,000.

== History ==
The name of the event is after a nickname for the city of Louisville where river traffic between the upper Ohio River and the Gulf of Mexico provided the early settlement of Louisville as it grew as a portage site.

The event was inaugurated on 30 October 1978, opening day of Churchill Downs Fall meeting as the River City Handicap as a six furlong dirt race and was won by Inca Roca who won his fifth race from fourteen starts in a time of 1:10 2/5.

The event was run over six furlongs until 1981 and then increased to 1 mile. In 1987 the event was scheduled on the turf over a distance of 1 1/16 miles. The following year the distance of the event increased to 1 1/8 miles but it was moved off the turf and onto the main track due to inclement weather.

The American Graded Stakes Committee classified the event as Grade III in 1996 and was won by the 2/1 favourite Same Old Wish. Same Old Wish would win the event again the following year as a seven-year-old.

The event was run as a handicap prior to 2019.

The race was not run from 2020 to 2021 and in 2022 when the event was resumed it was moved to the dirt track due to the state of turf track and was downgraded to Listed status.

== Records ==
Speed record:

- 1 1/8 miles: 1:45.58 – Wolfie's Dynaghost (2025)
- 1 mile (dirt): 1:36.20 - Taylor's Special (1986)

Margins:

- 7 lengths – Go With the Times (1979)

Most wins:

- 2 – Same Old Wish (1996, 1997)
- 2 – Dr. Kashnikow (CAN) (2001, 2002)
- 2 – Mr. Misunderstood (2018, 2019)

Most wins by an owner:

- 2 – Friendship Stable (1996, 1997)
- 2 – Erdenheim Farm (2001, 2002)
- 2 – Flurry Racing Stables (2018, 2019)

Most wins by a jockey:

- 6 – Pat Day (1982, 1984, 1986, 1991, 1999, 2000)

Most wins by a trainer:

- 3 – Claude R. McGaughey III (1984, 2023, 2024)

== Winners ==
Year	Winner	Age	Jockey	Trainer	Owner	Distance	Time	Purse	Grade	Ref
River City Stakes
2026	Mercante	6	Walter Rodriguez	Brian Knippenberg	Carl F. Pollard	1 1/8 miles	1:47.20	$300,000	III	
2025	Wolfie's Dynaghost	7	Luis Saez	Brian A. Lynch	Woodslane Farm	1 1/8 miles	1:45.58	$300,000	III	
2024	Battle of Normandy	4	Luan Machado	Claude R. McGaughey III	West Point Thoroughbreds & Woodford Racing	1 1/8 miles	1:48.79	$290,500	III	
2023	Smokin' T	4	John R. Velazquez	Claude R. McGaughey III	DATTT Stable	1 1/8 miles	1:50.66	$289,858	III	
2022	Hozier	4	Julien R. Leparoux	Rodolphe Brisset	Storyteller Racing	1 1/8 miles	1:51.67	$292,500	Listed	Off turf
2020–2021		Race not held								
2019	Mr. Misunderstood	5	Florent Geroux	Brad H. Cox	Flurry Racing Stables	1 1/8 miles	1:53.31	$175,000	III	
River City Handicap
2018	Mr. Misunderstood	4	Florent Geroux	Brad H. Cox	Flurry Racing Stables	1 1/8 miles	1:55.94	$100,000	III	
2017	Shining Copper	7	Corey J. Lanerie	Michael J. Maker	Kenneth and Sarah Ramsey	1 1/8 miles	1:52.78	$100,000	III	
2016	Thatcher Street	5	Brian Hernandez Jr	Ian R. Wilkes	Randall L. Bloch, Phil Milner, John Seiler & Amtietan	1 1/8 miles	1:51.45	$100,000	III	
2015	Heart to Heart (CAN)	4	Julien R. Leparoux	Brian A. Lynch	Terry Hamilton	1 1/8 miles	1:52.16	$100,000	III	
2014	Villandry	5	Julien R. Leparoux	Charles LoPresti	Gainesway Stable	1 1/8 miles	1:48.54	$114,000	III	
2013	Potomac River	4	Juan P. Vargas	Sergio Baez	Maribel Ruelas	1 1/8 miles	1:51.20	$116,300	III	
2012	Keep Up	5	Miguel Mena	Alex Clarkson	Mill Ridge Farm	1 1/8 miles	1:48.05	$115,700	III	
2011	Blues Street	7	Robby Albarado	Eddie Kenneally	Anstu Stables	1 1/8 miles	1:51.72	$111,000	III	
2010	Battle of Hastings (GB)	4	Joel Rosario	Gregory Fox	Mike House	1 1/8 miles	1:48.90	$111,200	III	
2009	Rahystrada	5	Leandro D. Goncalves	Byron G. Hughes	Robert E. Courtney Jr.	1 1/8 miles	1:49.18	$112,700	III	
2008	Karelian	6	William D. Troilo	George R. Arnold II	Green Lantern Stables	1 1/8 miles	1:50.06	$114,400	III	Dead heat
2008	Demarcation	4	Jesus Lopez Castanon	Paul J. McGee	Amerman Racing Stables	1 1/8 miles	1:50.06	$114,400	III	Dead heat
2007	Thorn Song	4	Kent J. Desormeaux	Dale L. Romans	Zayat Stables	1 1/8 miles	1:51.37	$227,400	III	
2006	Bayeux	5	John R. Velazquez	Gerard A. Butler	Michael Tabor	1 1/8 miles	1:48.77	$168,900	III	
2005	America Alive	4	Robby Albarado	Neil J. Howard	Mill House	1 1/8 miles	1:50.78	$167,700	III	
2004	G P Fleet	4	Jose R. Martinez Jr.	Steven B. Flint	Richard Bertram & Elaine Klein	1 1/8 miles	1:51.26	$174,300	III	
2003	Hard Buck (BRZ)	4	Brice Blanc	Kenneth G. McPeek	Team Victory II	1 1/8 miles	1:51.60	$172,800	III	
2002	Dr. Kashnikow (CAN)	5	Robby Albarado	John R. S. Fisher	Erdenheim Farm	1 1/8 miles	1:51.44	$175,650	III	
2001	Dr. Kashnikow (CAN)	4	Robby Albarado	John R. S. Fisher	Erdenheim Farm	1 1/8 miles	1:47.90	$177,300	III	
2000	Brahms	3	Pat Day	W. Elliott Walden	Tom Van Meter	1 1/8 miles	1:48.09	$180,450	III	
1999	Comic Strip	4	Pat Day	Neil J. Howard	William S. Farish III, G. Watts Humphrey Jr. & James Elkins	1 1/8 miles	1:50.71	$171,150	III	
1998	Wild Event	5	Shane Sellers	Louis M. Goldfine	Arthur I. Appleton	1 1/8 miles	1:49.18	$187,800	III	
1997	Same Old Wish	7	Shane Sellers	Robert Barbara	Friendship Stable	1 1/8 miles	1:50.90	$171,900	III	
1996	Same Old Wish	6	Shane Sellers	Robert Barbara	Friendship Stable	1 1/8 miles	1:49.21	$113,100	III	
1995	Homing Pigeon	5	Randy Romero	Harvey L. Vanier	Nancy A. Vanier	1 1/8 miles	1:51.00	$112,800	Listed	
1994	Lindon Lime	4	Shane Sellers	W. Elliott Walden	Frank Mansell	1 1/8 miles	1:49.30	$116,400	Listed	
1993	Secreto's Hideaway	4	Willie Martinez	Akiko M. Gothard	Mickey Liber	1 1/8 miles	1:53.83	$111,800	Listed	Off turf
1992	Cozzene's Prince (CAN)	5	Dave Penna	Tino Attard	Kirby Canada Farm	1 1/8 miles	1:49.31	$112,400	Listed	
1991	Spending Record	4	Pat Day	D. Wayne Lukas	Moyglare Stud Farm	1 1/8 miles	1:50.34	$115,500	Listed	
1990	Silver Medallion	4	Craig Perret	Philip M. Hauswald	Brereton C. Jones	1 1/8 miles	1:50.80	$87,000		
1989	Spark O'Dan	4	Joe M. Johnson	Gary G. Hartlage	William S. Greene	1 1/8 miles	1:50.80	$85,275		
1988	Ile de Jinsky	4	Eugene J. Sipus Jr.	William C. Thomas	Finish Line Stable	1 1/8 miles	1:53.20	$68,310		Off turf
1987	Kings River II (IRE)	5	Mike E. Smith	William I. Mott	Bertram Firestone	1 1/16 miles	1:45.40	$57,150		
River City Stakes
1986	Taylor's Special	5	Pat Day	William I. Mott	William Lucas	1 mile	1:36.20	$46,165		
1985	Banner Bob	6	K. Keith Allen	Jerome J. Sarner Jr.	William J. & Sharon Walsh	1 mile	1:36.60	$44,800		
1984	Eminency	4	Pat Day	Claude R. McGaughey III	Happy Valley Farm	1 mile	1:38.40	$28,350		
1983	Northern Majesty	3	Sam Maple	Raymond S. Lawrence Jr.	Leslie Combs II & C. C. Green	1 mile	1:37.00	$28,450		
River City Handicap
1982	Pleasing Times	3	Pat Day	Joseph M. Bollero	Tom Gentry	1 mile	1:38.20	$31,250		
1981	Suliman	4	Larry Snyder	Robert E. Holthus	Joyce Starr & Dixie Holthus	6 furlongs	1:10.60	$30,950		
1980	Tinsley's Hope	6	Julio C. Espinoza	William C. Thomas	Henry Pace	6 furlongs	1:11.00	$29,300		
1979	Go With the Times	3	Gerland Gallitano	Joseph M. Bollero	Russell Reineman	6 furlongs	1:10.20	$25,000		
1978	Inca Roca	5	Julio C. Espinoza	Earl J. Puckett	Charles Jarrell	6 furlongs	1:10.40	$27,475		

Legend:
Dirt Turf

== See also ==
- List of American and Canadian Graded races
