= Not Bourbon =

Canadian Thoroughbred racehorse

- Sire: Not Impossible
- Grandsire: Sadler's Wells
- Dam: Bourbon Belle
- Damsire: Storm Boot
- Sex: Stallion
- Foaled: 2005
- Country: Canada
- Colour: Chestnut
- Breeder: Charles E. Fipke
- Owner: Charles E. Fipke
- Trainer: Roger Attfield
- Record: 10: 5-2-1
- Earnings: $961,160

Major wins
- Bull Page Stakes (2007); Queenston Stakes (2008); Plate Trial Stakes (2008); Overskate Stakes (2008) Canadian Classic Race wins: Queen's Plate (2008)

Awards
- Sovereign Award for Champion 3-Year-Old Colt (2008)
- Last updated on June 8, 2008

Not Bourbon (foaled in Ontario in 2005) is a Canadian Thoroughbred race horse. He is owned and bred by Charles E. Fipke and ridden by Jono Jones. At age two, Not Bourbon set a new Woodbine track record in winning the Bull Page Stakes. Racing at age three, he won the Queenston Stakes then upset heavily favored Harlem Rocker in the Plate Trial Stakes.

On June 22, 2008, Not Bourbon captured the $1 million Grade I Queen's Plate, edging out the hard-charging filly Ginger Brew. For trainer Roger Attfield, it was his record-tying eighth win in the Canadian Classic. In the July 13th Prince of Wales Stakes, the second leg of the Canadian Triple Crown series, Not Bourbon finished sixth after flipping his palate during the race. As a result, the colt had to undergo throat surgery.

For his 2008 performances, Not Bourbon was voted the Sovereign Award for Champion 3-Year-Old Male Horse. Charles E. Fipke, the colt's breeder, is also the owner of Tale of the Ekati, who finished 4th after a good trip in the 2008 Kentucky Derby.

Stud Career Not Bourbon has stood for stud in both 2011 and 2012 at Norse Ridge Farm in King City, Ontario Canada.
