= Izvestia (horse) =

Canadian-bred Thoroughbred racehorse

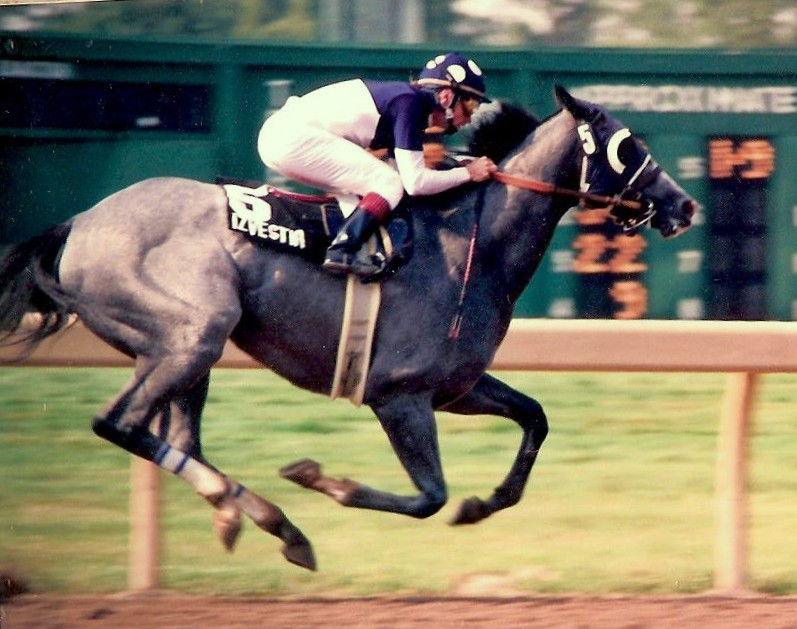
- Izvestia winning Prince of Wales Stakes
- Sire: Icecapade
- Grandsire: Nearctic
- Dam: Shy Spirit
- Damsire: Personality
- Sex: Stallion
- Foaled: 1987
- Country: Canada
- Colour: Grey
- Breeder: Kinghaven Farms
- Owner: Kinghaven Farms
- Trainer: Roger Attfield
- Record: 21: 11-2-2
- Earnings: $2,702,527

Major wins
- Forerunner Stakes (1990); Transylvania Stakes (1990); Plate Trial Stakes (1990); Molson Export Million (1990); Canadian Turf Handicap (1991); Eclipse Handicap (1991) Canadian Triple Crown wins: Queen's Plate (1990); Prince of Wales Stakes (1990); Breeders' Stakes (1990)

Awards
- 9th Canadian Triple Crown (1990); Canadian 3-yr-Old Champion Colt (1990); Canadian Champion Male Turf Horse (1990); Canadian Horse of the Year (1990)

Honours
- Canadian Horse Racing Hall of Fame (1999); Izvestia Stakes at Woodbine Racetrack
- Last updated on September 24, 2020

Izvestia (May 5, 1987 – October 21, 1991) was a Thoroughbred racehorse who won the Canadian Triple Crown in 1990.

A grandson of Nearctic, who sired the legendary Northern Dancer, his damsire Personality was the 1970 Co-American Horse of the Year. Owned and bred by Kinghaven Farms, Izvestia began racing in the United States, winning two Graded stakes races at the Keeneland Race Course in Kentucky. He was shipped north in the spring of 1990 to his home base at Woodbine Racetrack in Toronto from which he won the Triple Crown. Having won it a year earlier on With Approval, jockey Don Seymour became the only jockey in history to ride two Canadian Triple Crown winners.

Izvestia's career ended on October 21, 1991, when he had to be humanely euthanized after breaking a left hind leg in three places while competing in the Rothmans International. In 1999, he was inducted into the Canadian Horse Racing Hall of Fame.

Pedigree of Izvestia, gray stallion, 1987
Sire Icecapade	Nearctic	Nearco	Pharos
Sire Icecapade	Nearctic	Nearco	Nogara
Sire Icecapade	Nearctic	Lady Angela	Hyperion
Sire Icecapade	Nearctic	Lady Angela	Sister Sarah
Sire Icecapade	Shenanigans	Native Dancer	Polynesian
Sire Icecapade	Shenanigans	Native Dancer	Geisha
Sire Icecapade	Shenanigans	Bold Irish	Fighting Fox
Sire Icecapade	Shenanigans	Bold Irish	Erin
Dam Shy Spirit	Personality	Hail To Reason	Turn-To
Dam Shy Spirit	Personality	Hail To Reason	Nothirdchance
Dam Shy Spirit	Personality	Affectionately	Swaps
Dam Shy Spirit	Personality	Affectionately	Searching
Dam Shy Spirit	Cool Mood	Northern Dancer	Nearctic
Dam Shy Spirit	Cool Mood	Northern Dancer	Natalma
Dam Shy Spirit	Cool Mood	Happy Mood	Mahmoud
Dam Shy Spirit	Cool Mood	Happy Mood	La Reigh (family: 2-n)
