= Mark Guidry =

American jockey

Personal information
- Born: August 6, 1959 (age 67) Lafayette, Louisiana, U.S.
- Occupation: Jockey

Horse racing career
- Sport: Horse racing
- Career wins: 5,222

Major racing wins
- Commonwealth Breeders' Cup Stakes (1990); Illinois Oaks (1991); Illinois Silent Beauty Stakes (1991, 1996); National Jockey Club Handicap (1992, 1998); Davona Dale Stakes (1993); Sabin Stakes (1993); Hawthorne Derby (1994); Royal Glint Stakes (1994, 1996); Hawthorne Gold Cup Handicap (1995, 1997); Arlington Handicap (1996, 1997); Sportman's Park Breeders Cup Handicap (1996, 1997, 2000); Arlington-Washington Futurity Stakes (1996, 2002, 2005, 2006); Washington Park Handicap (1996, 2005); National Jockey Club Oaks (1996); In Reality Stakes (1997); Round Table Stakes (1997); General George Handicap (1997); Pontalba Stakes (1997); Shadwell Turf Mile Stakes (1997); High Alexander Stakes (1997, 1999); Fourstardave Handicap (1998); Hawthorne Juvenile Stakes (1999); Alcibiades Stakes (2000); Mrs. Revere Stakes (2000); Arlington Oaks (2000, 2007); Arkansas Derby (2001); Arlington Classic (2001, 2005); Lane's End Stakes (2001); Bourbon Stakes (2001); Azalea Stakes (2001); Mecke Stakes (2001); Indian Summer Stakes (2001); Modesty Handicap (2001); Spiral Stakes (2001); Lake George Stakes (2001); W.L. McKnight Handicap (2001); Gardenia Stakes (2001, 2004); Humana Distaff Handicap (2002); Gulfstream Oaks (2002); Appalachian Stakes (2002); Queen Elizabeth II Challenge Cup Stakes (2002); Bewitch Stakes (2002); Jefferson Cup Stakes (2002); Bashford Manor Stakes (2002); Tropical Park Derby (2002); Cradle Stakes (2002); Cornhusker Handicap (2002, 2004); Pocahontas Stakes (2002, 2005); Canadian Turf Handicap (2003); Regret Stakes (2003); Bertram F. Bongard Stakes (2003); Florida Oaks (2003); Lake Placid Stakes (2003); Marshua's River Stakes (2003); Honey Fox Handicap (2003); The Very One Handicap (2003); Holy Bull Stakes (2003); Fairway Fun Stakes (2004); Weekend Delight Stakes (2004); Golden Rod Stakes (2005); Cardinal Handicap (2005); Santa Anita Derby (2005); Golden Gate Derby (2005); San Simeon Handicap (2005); Arlington Matron Handicap (2005); Commonwealth Turf Stakes (2005); West Virginia Derby (2005, 2006); West Virginia Governor's Stakes (2005); Kentucky Oaks (2006); Sunshine Millions Oaks (2006); Raven Run Stakes (2006); Locust Grove Handicap (2006); Sea o'Erin Stakes (2006); Anne Arundel Stakes (2006); Kent Stakes (2006); Swale Stakes (2006); Palm Beach Stakes (2007); Valley View Stakes (2007); Sunshine Millions Fillies & Mares Sprint (2007); American Turf Stakes (2007); Miss Preakness Stakes (2007); Derby Trial (2007); Louisiana Futurity (2012); Acadiana Stakes (2013); Louisiana Legends Starter Stakes (2013); Louisiana Legends Ladies Sprint Stakes (2013); Louisiana Legends Sprint Stakes (2013); Louisiana Cup Distaff Stakes (2013); Louisiana Cup Filly and Mare Sprint Stakes (2013); Louisiana Cup Oaks (2013); Need for Speed Stakes (2013); Elge Rasberry Stakes (2013); Louisiana Cup Derby (2013); Golf Coast Stakes(2014)

Honours
- Hawthorne Hall of Fame (1997); George Woolf Memorial Jockey Award (2006); Louisiana Sports Hall of Fame (2012)

Significant horses
- Black Tie Affair, Balto Star, Baptize, Benny the Bull, Buck's Boy, Buzzards Bay, Deputy Warlock, Chrysalis House, Celtic Melody, Duveen, Evening Attire, Gold Dollar, Imawildandcrazyguy, Leah's Secret, Lemons Forever, Lone Star Sky, Meafara, Megans Bluff, Miss Linda, Offlee Wild, Nite Dreamer, Orchard Park, Political Attack, Polar Expedition, Perfect Drift, Purim, Riskaverse, Roses in May, San Dare, Sand Springs, Sharp Humor, She's A Devil Due, Silverfoot, Stalwars, Sweetest Thing, Take That Step, Why Change, Wild Event, Zend to Aiken
- Updated on June 5, 2007

Mark Guidry (born August 6, 1959, in Lafayette, Louisiana) is a former American jockey. He ranks 22nd among jockeys in career wins with 5,222 wins as of March 7, 2014, the date of his last ride. He subsequently announced his retirement from riding to become a jockey's agent. This was Guidry's second retirement. He initially retired in 2007 and did not ride again for 4 more years.

== Career ==
He began his riding career in Thoroughbred horse racing in his native Louisiana in 1974 at the age of 15 where he remained until 1986 when he went to race in Illinois. He earned the moniker "King of Chicago" in the 1990s, by leading jockeys in wins at Hawthorne Race Course seven times, Sportsman's Park nine times, two times at Arlington Park. He also captured the 2005 riding title at Churchill Downs. Guidry earned his 5,000th career win at Churchill Downs on May 4, 2007, before retiring for the first time later that year.

One of his first stakes wins as a jockey was at the age of 15 in 1974 in the Old Hickory Stakes at Fairgrounds Race Course on board Honey Mark for trainer Larry Robideaux. He won the 1978 Delta Downs riding title.

At the spring Sportsman's Park meet of 1992, Guidry had three separate six-win days.

On April 25, 1992, he equaled a record by winning four stakes on a single card as part of a six win day on a card at Sportsman's Park, including the National Jockey Club Handicap on Stalwars and three other stakes wins — on Cu's Gig, Take that Step and Zend to Aiken. His four stakes wins that day tied a record held by Jerry Bailey, Randy Romero and Pat Valenzuela for most stakes wins by a jockey on a single card.

On March 20, 1992, he won six races on a card at Sportsman's Park, all at odds of 5-1 or more. On April 5, 1992, he had six come from behind wins.

In 1994, he set a new single season riding record at Hawthorne with 117 victories at the fall meet. He broke that record in 1995 with 137 wins. In 1997, Hawthorne Race Course voted him into their Racing Hall of Fame.

In 2001, he rode Todd Pletcher's Balto Star to victories in the Arkansas Derby and Lane's End Stakes. In 2002, he set a course record at Churchill Downs on board Island Echo winning a five-furlong turf allowance sprint in 55.91 seconds for trainer Bill Mott.

In 2003, he won the Holy Bull Stakes at 27–1 on board Offlee Wild at Gulfstream Park.

In 2005, he won the Santa Anita Derby on Buzzards Bay and rode him to a fifth-place finish in the Kentucky Derby. In the 2005 Breeders' Cup Classic, he guided 14-1 shot Perfect Drift to a closing third-place finish.

In 2006, he rode Lemons Forever, a 47-1 shot, to a come from behind victory in the 132nd Kentucky Oaks. She was the longest shot to ever win the storied race for three-year-old fillies. That same year, he was voted the esteemed George Woolf Memorial Jockey Award by his peers in part for his assistance to the victims of Hurricane Katrina.

In 2006, he won the Swale Stakes on Sharp Humor, and ran second with him by a half length in the Florida Derby to Barbaro. Guidry and Sharp Humor nearly held off the eventual Kentucky Derby winner in a thrilling stretch duel.

In the 2007 Kentucky Derby, Guidry rode 50-1 longshot Imawildandcrazyguy to a fourth-place finish.

He retired on November 10, 2007, having won 5,043 races during his riding career.

After retiring, he spent more than two years as a trainer.

After four years way from riding, he returned to the saddle in the summer of 2011, beginning his comeback at Ellis Park, before moving on to Keeneland, Churchill Downs and the Tampa Bay Downs winter meet. He picked up his riding in the spring of 2012 full-time at the Louisiana Downs spring/summer meet, where he commanded a 24 percent winning rate. His mounts were in the money more than 50 percent of the time in 2012.

On July 6, 2013, he had five winners and three seconds, including three stakes wins on Louisiana Legends stakes day at Evangeline Downs. Mark Guidry resides in New Orleans, Louisiana, with his wife Tina, and children Marcus, Mecus and Fallon.

== Year-end charts ==
| Chart (2000–present) | Peak position |
|---|---|
| National Earnings List for Jockeys 2000 | 25 |
| National Earnings List for Jockeys 2001 | 34 |
| National Earnings List for Jockeys 2002 | 26 |
| National Earnings List for Jockeys 2005 | 16 |
| National Earnings List for Jockeys 2006 | 20 |
