= Jefferson Cup Stakes =

- Class: Grade III
- Location: Churchill Downs; Louisville, Kentucky, United States
- Inaugurated: 1977
- Race type: Thoroughbred – Flat racing
- Website: Churchill Downs

Race information
- Distance: 1 1/16 miles (8.5 furlongs)
- Surface: Turf
- Track: Left-handed
- Qualification: Three-year-olds
- Weight: Assigned
- Purse: $100,000

The Jefferson Cup Stakes is an American Thoroughbred horse race run in mid-June near the end of the Churchill Downs Spring Meet in Louisville, Kentucky. A race on turf, it is open to three-year-old horses of either gender.

For 2010, the purse was dropped from $200,000 to $100,000 and the race was downgraded from a Grade II event at a mile and an eighth (9 furlongs) to a Grade III level at a mile and a sixteenth.

Since inception, the Jefferson Cup Stakes has been contested at various distances:

- 5.5 furlongs : 1977–1981
- 1 1/16 miles : 1982, 2010–2013
- 1 1/8 miles : 1983–2009

== Records ==
Speed record

- 1 1/8 miles – 1:47.27 – King Cugat (2000)
- 1 1/16 miles – 1:43.66 – Banned (2011)

== Winners of the Jefferson Cup Stakes since 1999 ==
Year	Winner	Age	Jockey	Trainer	Owner	Distance (Miles)	Time	Grade
2016	One Mean Man	3	Robby Albarado	Bernard S. Flint	L. T. B./Hillerich Racing	1-1/8	1:50.23	III
2015	Saham	3	Joseph Rocco Jr.	Brendan P. Walsh	Sultan Bin Mishal	1-1 mile	1:37.76	III
2014	Heart to Heart	3	Julien Leparoux	Brian A. Lynch	Terry Hamilton	1-1 mile	1:34.44	III
2013	General Election	3	Ricardo Santana Jr.	Wesley A. Ward	Ken and Sarah Ramsey	1-1 mile	1:35.96	III
2012						1-1/16		II
2011	Banned	3	Jose Lezcano	Tom Proctor	Glen Hill Farm	1-1/16	1:43.66	II
2010	Gleam of Hope	3	E. T. Baird	Anthony L. Reinstedler	Dr. A. C. & Claire Asbury	1-1/16	1:45.61	II
2009	Florentino	3	Alan Garcia	Kiaran McLaughlin	Darley Racing	1-1/8	1:51.59	II
2008	Tizdejavu	3	Garrett Gomez	Gregory Fox	Michael Cooper & Pamela Ziebarth	1-1/8	1:49.15	II
2007	Inca King	3	Shaun Bridgmohan	Steve Asmussen	Heiligbrodt Racing	1-1/8	1:48.94	II
2006	Brilliant	3	Robby Albarado	Neil J. Howard	Mill House	1-1/8	1:48.47	II
2005	Rush Bay	3	Robby Albarado	Thomas Amoss	Phoebe Ann Miller Trust	1-1/8	1:48.75	III
2004	Prince Arch	3	Brice Blanc	Kenneth McPeek	Raymond H. Cottrell Sr.	1-1/8	1:50.61	III
2003	Senor Swinger	3	Robby Albarado	Bob Baffert	Bob & Beverly Lewis	1-1/8	1:47.54	III
2002	Orchard Park	3	Mark Guidry	William I. Mott	Peter Vegso	1-1/8	1:48.53	III
2001	Indygo Shiner	3	Lonnie Meche	W. Elliott Walden	Joseph LaCombe et al.	1-1/8	1:48.81	III
2000	King Cugat	3	Robby Albarado	William I. Mott	Centennial Farms	1-1/8	1:47.27	
1999	Special Coach	3	Jorge Velásquez	Bill March	Cecilia Dixon	1-1/8	1:49.82	
1998	Buff	3	Calvin Borel			1-1/8	1:50.80	
1997	Greed Is Good	3	Willie Martinez			1-1/8	1:49.47	
1996	Unruled	3	Craig Perret			1-1/8	1:50.07	
1995	Ago	3	Shane Sellers			1-1/8	1:49.48	
1994	Milt's Overyure	3	Pat Day			1-1/8	1:48.21	

== Earlier winners ==
- 1993 – Lt. Pinkerton (1:48.27)
- 1992 – Senor Thomas (1:49.80)
- 1991 – Hanging Curve (1:50.89)
- 1990 – Divine Warning (1:52.20)
- 1989 – Shy Tom (1:49.20)
- 1988 – Stop the Stage (1:51.60)
- 1987 – Fast Forward (1:50)
- 1986 – Buffalo Beau (1:52.80)
- 1985 – Aveys Brother (1:50)
- 1984 – Coax Me Chad (1:50.60)
- 1983 – Pron Regard (1:51.60)
- 1982 – Wavering Monarch (1:44.20)
- 1981 – Talent Town (1:05.40)
- 1980 – Golden Derby (1:04.20)
- 1979 – Rockhill Native (1:05.20)
- 1978 – Future Hope (1:05.20)
- 1977 – Old Jake (1:04.80)
