= Cryptocloser =

Canadian-bred Thoroughbred racehorse

- Sire: Cryptoclearance
- Grandsire: Fappiano
- Dam: Cuddle Up Closer
- Damsire: Vice Regent
- Sex: Stallion
- Foaled: 1994
- Country: Canada
- Colour: Bay
- Owner: Earle I. Mack & William A. Sorokolit, Sr.
- Trainer: Mark Frostad
- Record: 25: 4-6-2
- Earnings: Can$368,302

Major wins
- Plate Trial Stakes (1997) Canadian Classic Race wins: Prince of Wales Stakes (1997)

Awards
- Canadian Champion 3-Year-Old Male Horse (1997)

Cryptocloser (1994–2000) was a Canadian Thoroughbred Champion racehorse. He was sired by multiple Grade I winner Cryptoclearance, and his damsire was Northern Dancer's son, Vice Regent. The colt was owned in partnership by American businessman and future United States Ambassador to Finland Earle I. Mack, and Mississauga, Ontario businessman William A. Sorokolit, Sr.

Cryptocloser was trained by Mark Frostad. In 1997, Willie Martinez rode the colt to victory in the Plate Trial Stakes then, after a troubled start when he was interfered with by another horse, came back to finish second to Awesome Again in Canada's most prestigious race, the Queen's Plate. He then won the Prince of Wales Stakes, the second leg of the Canadian Triple Crown series. His performances in 1997 earned Cryptocloser the Sovereign Award for Champion 3-Year-Old Male Horse and helped Mark Frostad earn the first of his three sovereign Awards for Outstanding Trainer.

Out of racing for two years, in his return on July 22, 2000, Cryptocloser suffered a broken shoulder after falling down past the wire and had to be euthanized.
