= Afleet =

Canadian Thoroughbred racehorse

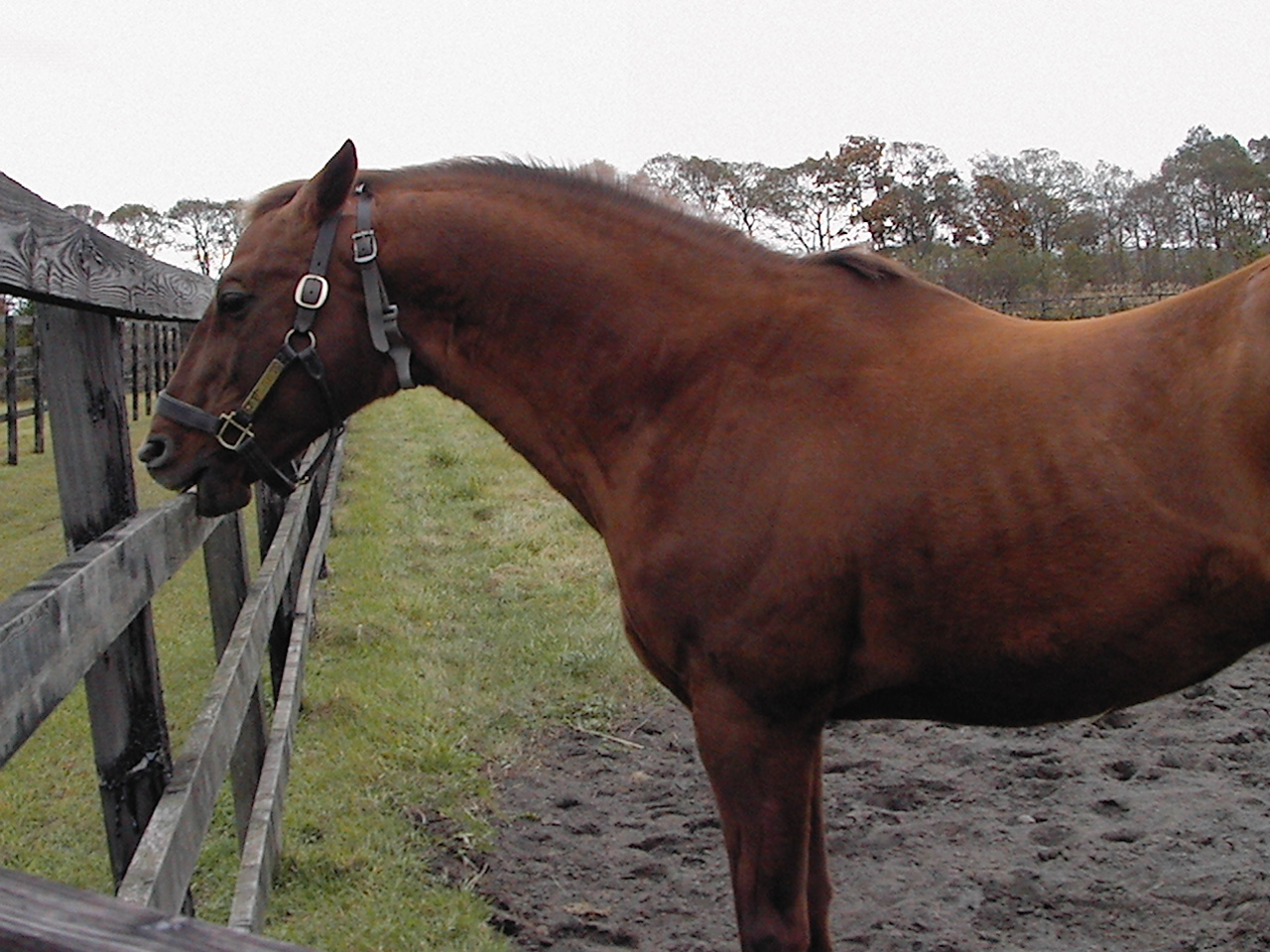
- Afleet in October 2008.
- Sire: Mr. Prospector
- Grandsire: Raise a Native
- Dam: Polite Lady
- Damsire: Venetian Jester
- Sex: Stallion
- Foaled: 1984
- Country: Canada
- Colour: Chestnut
- Breeder: Richard R. Kennedy
- Owner: R. R. Kennedy & Taylor Made Farm
- Trainer: Phillip England
- Record: 15: 7-4-2
- Earnings: $995,235

Major wins
- Friar Rock Stakes (1987); Plate Trial Stakes (1987); Queenston Stakes (1987); Jerome Handicap (1987); Pennsylvania Derby (1988); Toboggan Handicap (1988)

Awards
- Canadian Horse of the Year (1987); Canadian Champion Three-Year-Old Colt (1987)
- Last updated on October 14, 2021

Afleet (1984 - 2014) was a Canadian-bred Thoroughbred racehorse who was voted the 1987 Canadian Horse of the Year and Canadian Champion Three-Year-Old Colt.

== Career ==
Afleet's best season came in 1987 during his three-year-old campaign, in which he won six races in ten starts. These wins include the Jerome Handicap (G1) and Pennsylvania Derby (G2) in the United States plus the Friar Rock Stakes, Queenston Stakes and Plate Trial Stakes in Canada. He also placed in the Meadowlands Cup Handicap (G1) and the Queen's Plate. Afleet only finished below third on two occasions with a fifth place in the Marine Stakes, and a tenth-place finish in the Breeders Cup Classic (G1).

As a four-year-old in 1988 he won the Toboggan Handicap (G3) and finished second in the Metropolitan Handicap (G1) and Carter Handicap (G1), and ran third in the Breeders' Cup Sprint (G1) and Massachusetts Handicap (G2).

== Retirement ==
Afleet was retired to stud in 1989 and stood at Taylor Made Farm who had bought an interest in him while still racing.

His North American progeny included Canadian Champion A Fleet's Dancer, Grade 1 winners Flat Fleet Feet and Twist Afleet. He also produced the Grade 2 winner, Northern Afleet, who is a successful sire standing in Kentucky. His progeny includes the 2005 Preakness and Belmont Stakes winner, Afleet Alex. In 1990 Afleet was sold to Japanese breeders, he continued producing grade 1 winners such as Big Wolf and Bamboo Ere, along with multi-millionaire Preeminence. Afleet sired over 60 stakes winners in 21 foal crops.

== Death ==
Afleet was pensioned from stud service in 2011. He later died in 2014 at the age of 30 where he stood at Breeder's Stallion Station in Japan.
