= Plate Trial Stakes =

- Class: Restricted stakes
- Location: Woodbine Racetrack; Toronto, Ontario Canada
- Inaugurated: 1944
- Race type: Thoroughbred - Flat racing
- Website: www.woodbineentertainment.com

Race information
- Distance: 1 1/8 miles (9 furlongs)
- Surface: Polytrack
- Track: left-handed
- Qualification: Three-year-olds foaled in Canada
- Weight: Scale Weight
- Purse: $150,000 (2021)

The Plate Trial Stakes is a Canadian Thoroughbred flat horserace for three-Year-Olds, foaled in Canada run annually at Woodbine Racetrack in Toronto, Ontario. Raced in early June, the 1 1/8-mile race on dirt is considered one of the most important prep races for Canada's premier horse race, the Queen's Plate.

Inaugurated in 1944 at the Old Woodbine Race Course as a six furlong sprint race, it was moved to the new Woodbine Racetrack in 1957 following that track's closure. In the first forty-eight years, a total of twenty-two winners of the Plate Trial Stakes went on to win the Queen's Plate. However, in the last sixteen years, no horse has accomplished the feat. Most recently, 2012 Plate Trial winner, River Rush, finished a disappointing 6th in the 2012 running of the Plate.

Hall of Fame jockey Avelino Gomez won this race a record nine times including four in a row from 1964 through 1967.

In 1955, Ace Marine won two versions of the race, one at six furlongs and another at a mile and 70 yards.

Since inception, the Plate Trial has been contested at various distances. In 1955, it was run as two races at the Old Woodbine Race Course. The first race consisted of four divisions and contested at 6 furlongs and the second race was made up of three divisions at 1 mile and 70 yards. In other years the distance was:

- 6 furlongs : 1944–1955 at Old Woodbine Race Course
- 7 furlongs : 1956 at Old Woodbine Race Course
- 8.5 furlongs (1 1/16 miles) : 1957-1979 Woodbine Racetrack
- 9 furlongs (1 1/8 miles) : since 1980 at Woodbine Racetrack

== Records ==
Time record: (a current distance of 1 1/8 miles)

- 1:48.97 - River Rush (2012)

Most wins by an owner:

- 12 - E. P. & Winnifred Taylor and/or Windfields Farm:
  (1949, 1952 (2), 1953, 1954 (2), 1957 (2), 1960, 1963, 1979, 1988)

Most wins by a jockey:

- 9 - Avelino Gomez (1955, 1957, 1959, 1960, 1961, 1964, 1965, 1966, 1967)

Most wins by a trainer:

- 9 - Gordon J. McCann (1952 (2), 1953, 1954 (2), 1957 (2), 1960, 1963)

== Winners of the Plate Trial Stakes since 1987 ==
Year	Winner	Jockey	Trainer	Owner	Time
2025					
2024	My Boy Prince	Sahin Civaci	Mark Casse	Gary Barber	1:51.12
2023	Paramount Prince	Patrick Husbands	Mark Casse	Michael J. Langlois & Gary Barber	1:49.99
2022	Sir For Sure	Declan Carroll	Mark Casse	Heste Sport Inc.	1:50.62
2021	Avoman	Antonio Gallardo	Donald MacRae	D-Mac Racing Stable & La Huerta	1:52.84
2020	Clayton	Rafael M. Hernandez	Kevin Attard	Donato Lanni & Daniel Plouffe	1:50.61
2019	Pay For Peace	Luis Contreras	Rachel Holden	Team Penney Racing & Carem Stable	1:51.63
2018	Telekinesis	Patrick Husbands	Mark Casse	Stonestreet Stables	1:50.40
2017	Guy Caballero	Rafael M. Hernandez	Catherine Day Phillips	Sean & Dorothy Fitzhenry	1:51.32
2016	Amis Gismo	Luis Contreras	Josie Carroll	Ivan Dalos	1:52.12
2015	Danish Dynaformer	Luis Contreras	Roger L. Attfield	Charles E. Fipke	1:49.81
2014	We Miss Artie	Javier Castellano	Todd Pletcher	Kenneth and Sarah Ramsey	1:50.78
2013	Dynamic Sky	Joel Rosario	Mark Casse	John Oxley	1:50.59
2012	River Rush	Jim McAleney	Stronach Stables	Reade Baker	1:48.97
2011	Check Your Soul	Patrick Husbands	Roger Attfield	Charles E. Fipke	1:51.16
2010	Big Red Mike	Eurico Rosa da Silva	Nicholas Gonzalez	Terra Racing Stable	1:50.41
2009	Eye of the Leopard	Eurico Rosa Da Silva	Mark Frostad	Sam-Son Farm	1:51.80
2008	Not Bourbon	Jono Jones	Roger Attfield	Charles E. Fipke	1:49.73
2007	Jiggs Coz	David Clark	Sid C. Attard	Mel P. Lawson	1:50.77
2006	Pipers Thunder	Ray Sabourin	Eric Coatrieux	Chiefswood Stable	1:51.65
2005	Three In The Bag *	Robert Landry	Stanley M. Hough	Castletop Stable	1:52.52
2004	A Bit O'Gold	Jono Jones	Catherine Day Phillips	The Two Bit Racing Stable	1:51.74
2003	Mobil	Todd Kabel	Mike Keogh	Gus Schickedanz	1:51.84
2002	Shaws Creek	Jake Barton	John A. Ross	Bud Reynolds	1:52.38
2001	Win City	Constant Montpellier	Robert P. Tiller	Frank DiGiulio Jr.	1:52.08
2000	Pete's Sake	Patrick Husbands	Todd A. Pletcher	Gerald Frankel	1:53.05
1999	Catahoula Parish	Robert Landry	John A. Ross	Jam Jar Racing	1:51.18
1998	Brite Adam	James McKnight	Rita Schnitzler	R.M.C. Stable	1:50.60
1997	Cryptocloser	Willie Martinez	Mark Frostad	Earle I. Mack & William A. Sorokolit Sr.	1:51.00
1996	Northface	Todd Kabel	Daniel J. Vella	Frank Stronach	1:50.00
1995	All Firmed Up	Todd Kabel	Daniel J. Vella	Frank Stronach	1:50.60
1994	Bruce's Mill	Dave Penna	Mark Frostad	Earle I. Mack et al.	1:50.60
1993	Circulating	Richard Dos Ramos	Roderick W. Wright	Sherwood/Sheehan Farms	1:52.40
1992	Alydeed	Craig Perret	Roger Attfield	Kinghaven Farms	1:50.00
1991	Megas Vukefalos *	Mickey Walls	Jerry C. Meyer	Knob Hill Stable	1:51.00
1991	Bolulight *	Don Seymour	Roger Attfield	Kinghaven Farms	1:51.00
1990	Izvestia	Don Seymour	Roger Attfield	Kinghaven Farms	1:50.40
1989	With Approval	Don Seymour	Roger Attfield	Kinghaven Farms	1:50.80
1988	Regal Classic	Sandy Hawley	James E. Day	Sam-Son / Windfields	1:51.60
1987	Afleet	Gary Stahlbaum	Phil England	Richard R. Kennedy	1:50.20

- In 2005 Dance with Ravens won the race but for the first time ever in the history of the Plate Trial, the winner was disqualified.
- In 1991 there was a dead heat for first.

== Earlier notable winners ==
- Overskate (1978)
- Norcliffe (1976)
- Royal Chocolate (1973)
- Kennedy Road (1971)
- Merger (1968)
- Titled Hero (1966)
- Canebora (1963)
- Lyford Cay (1957)
- Ace Marine (1955)
