= Commonwealth Turf Stakes =

Flat turf horse race in the United States

- Class: Grade III
- Location: Churchill Downs; Louisville, Kentucky, United States
- Inaugurated: 2004
- Race type: Thoroughbred - Flat racing
- Website: Churchill Downs

Race information
- Distance: 1 1/16 miles
- Surface: Turf
- Track: Left-handed
- Qualification: Three-year-olds
- Weight: 123 lbs. with allowances
- Purse: $300,000 (2022)

The Commonwealth Turf Stakes is a Grade III American Thoroughbred horse race for three-year-olds run over a distance of one and one sixteenth miles on turf held annually in November at Churchill Downs in Louisville, Kentucky during the fall meeting.

== History ==
The event was inaugurated on 14 November 2004 and was won by the shortest of margins, a nose by the 18-1 outsider in field Broadway View, who was trained by US Hall of Fame trained Nick Zito in a time of 1:44.75.

The American Graded Stakes Committee classified the event as Grade III in 2008.

The event was not scheduled to be run in 2020 and 2021 due to the condition of the turf course.

== Records ==
Speed record

- 1:40.83 - Lagynos (2024)

Margins

- 4 1/4 lengths - Almasty (2015)

Most wins by an owner

- No owner has won this race more than once.

Most wins by a jockey

- 2 - Shaun Bridgmohan (2007, 2013)

Most wins by a trainer

- 4 - Steve Asmussen (2007, 2018, 2023, 2024)

== Winners ==
Year	Winner	Jockey	Trainer	Owner	Distance	Time	Purse	Grade	Ref
2025	Giocoso	José L. Ortiz	J. Keith Desormeaux	Rocker O Ranch	1 1/16 miles	1:41.47	$299,800	III	
2024	Lagynos	Flavien Prat	Steven M. Asmussen	HRH Prince Sultan Bin Mishal Al Saud	1 1/16 miles	1:40.83	$286,050	III	
2023	Gigante	Luan Machado	Steven M. Asmussen	Iapetus Racing and Diamond T Racing	1 1/16 miles	1:44.46	$257,500	Listed	Off turf
2022	Trademark	Martin Garcia	Victoria H. Oliver	BBN Racing	1 1/16 miles	1:46.39	$300,000	Listed	Off turf
2020–2021		Race not held							
2019	Mr Dumas	Joseph Rocco Jr.	John Alexander Ortiz	WSS Racing & Hooties Racing	1 1/16 miles	1:45.51	$175,000	III	
2018	Hot Springs	Ricardo Santana Jr.	Steven M. Asmussen	Woodford Racing	1 1/16 miles	1:46.97	$100,000	III	
2017	Mr. Misunderstood	Florent Geroux	Brad H. Cox	Flurry Racing Stables	1 1/16 miles	1:46.80	$100,000	III	
2016	Hay Dakota	Denny Velazquez	Joel Berndt	Alice Mettler	1 1/16 miles	1:43.60	$100,000	III	
2015	Almasty	Jon Court	Brad H. Cox	Rupp Racing Wentworth Brochu	1 1/16 miles	1:45.41	$100,000	III	
2014	Heart to Heart (CAN)	Julien R. Leparoux	Brian A. Lynch	Terry Hamilton	1 1/16 miles	1:41.54	$115,300	III	
2013	River Seven (CAN)	Shaun Bridgmohan	Nicholas Gonzalez	Tucci Stables	1 1/16 miles	1:44.11	$115,400	III	
2012	Lea	Brian Hernandez Jr.	Albert Stall Jr.	Claiborne Farm & Adele B. Dilschneider.	1 1/16 miles	1:42.27	$117,100	III	
2011	Humble and Hungry	Jose Lezcano	Ignacio Correas IV	Sagamore Farm	1 1/16 miles	1:45.24	$111,200	III	
2010	Yankee Fourtune	Victor Santiago	Kiaran P. McLaughlin	Harvey Clark & Andrew Albstein	1 1/16 miles	1:44.68	$121,900	III	
2009	Get Stormy	Javier Castellano	Thomas M. Bush	Sullimar Stables	1 1/16 miles	1:41.67	$112,100	III	
2008	Nistle's Crunch	Robby Albarado	Kenneth G. McPeek	Alien Farm	1 1/16 miles	1:44.48	$112,900	III	
2007	Inca King	Shaun Bridgmohan	Steven M. Asmussen	Heiligbrodt Racing	1 1/16 miles	1:43.17	$166,500	Listed	
2006	Arbuckle Bandit	Brice Blanc	Michael Stidham	Golden Racing Stable	1 1/16 miles	1:44.19	$169,800	Listed	
2005	Therecomesatiger	Mark Guidry	Thomas F. Proctor	Charles R. Patton	1 1/16 miles	1:43.94	$174,900	Listed	
2004	Broadway View	John McKee	Nick Zito	Live Oak Plantation Racing	1 1/16 miles	1:44.75	$171,150	Listed	

Legend:
Dirt Turf

== See also ==
- List of American and Canadian Graded races
