= Fort Lauderdale Stakes =

- Class: Grade III
- Location: Gulfstream Park; Hallandale Beach, Florida, United States
- Inaugurated: 1947 (as Fort Lauderdale Handicap)
- Race type: Thoroughbred – Flat racing
- Website: Gulfstream Park

Race information
- Distance: 1 1/8 miles (9 furlongs)
- Surface: Turf
- Track: left-handed
- Qualification: Three year olds and older
- Weight: Base weights with allowances: 4-year-olds and older: 126 lbs. 3-year-olds: 123 lbs.
- Purse: $200,000 (since 2025)

The Fort Lauderdale Stakes is a Grade III American Thoroughbred horse race open for three years old or older, over a distance of one and one-eighth miles on the turf track held annually in December at Gulfstream Park, Hallandale Beach, Florida. The event currently carries a purse of $215,000.

== History ==
The inaugural running of the event was on 5 April 1947 as the Fort Lauderdale Handicap and was won by the 2/5 odds-on favorite Eternal Reward who set a track record of 1:45 2/5 for the 1 1/16 miles distance on the dirt track. The event was brought forward for the second running during the 1947–48 meeting and was held on 27 December 1947. In 1950 and 1951 the event was run as the Fort Lauderdale Purse.

By the 1950s the event had established itself as a feature handicap for older horses in South Florida. The 1954 running attracted enough entrants that it was split into two divisions. In 1956 the winner New Trend ridden by US Hall of Fame jockey Willie Shoemaker set a new track record for the 1 1/16 miles distance of 1:42 flat winning easily by 3 1/2 lengths.

The following year, in 1957, the U.S. Champion Three-Year-Old Colt Needles, who had won both the 1956 Kentucky Derby and Belmont Stakes, ran his last race of his career here. Needles won the race, coming back from 20 lengths behind the leaders to win by two lengths in the end and equal the track record that was set in 1956.

The 1960s were a stable period for the event as it continually was held in early April. During those years the event attracted many fine entrants including three foreign bred winners including Captain Kidd II who won the National Breeders' Produce Stakes in England as a two-year-old, Valentine won won the event by 7 lengths in 1963 ran second in the important Eclipse Stakes at Sandown Park in England to Henry The Seventh. The 1965 renewal of the event was as the Fort Lauderdale Purse and was held on the turf track for the first time was won by the Argentine-bred Babington who equaled the world record for the distance in a stunning 1:40 4/5.

During the 1970s the legal inflighting between owner Donn family's Gulfstream Park and John W. Galbreath's Hialeah Park over racing date allotments impacted the scheduling of the event. The event was only held five times during that period. During the early 1980s the event was held over a distance of seven furlongs. In 1988 the event was scheduled on the turf over 1 1/16 miles and run in split divisions for the second time.

The 1994 winner Paradise Creek won the event as a 3/5 odds-on favorite with a determined stretch drive winning by 1/2 length. The victory was Paradise Creek's third win in a seven race winning streak. Later in the year Paradise Creek was awarded US Champion Male Turf Horse honors.

In 1995 the American Graded Stakes Committee classified the event as Grade III.

The event was not held in 2001, 2003 and 2004 which led to the event losing it classification.

In 2005 the race was renewed as a Black Type event with stakes allowance conditions with the modified name Fort Lauderdale Stakes.

Assigned Grade III status beginning in 2010. Due to weather, however, the race was run off the turf in 2010. It was run a mile on dirt and was automatically downgraded, pending review, after the event was switched. The American Graded Stakes Committee reinstated the Grade III rating. The decision to reinstate the Grade 3 rating was based on the quality of the horses who competed in the race following the surface change.

In 2013 the event was upgraded once more to Grade II.

In 2019 the distance of the event was increased from 1 1/16 miles to 1 1/8 miles.

In 2025 the event was downgraded by the Thoroughbred Owners and Breeders Association to Grade III status.

== Records ==
Speed record

- 1 1/8 miles turf: 1:43.42 – Wolfie's Dynaghost (2025) (New Track record)
- 1 1/16 miles turf: 1:38.26 – Union Place (2005)
- 1 1/16 miles dirt: 1:41.00 – Rouge Chanteur (1971)

Margins

- 8 lengths – Belleau Chief (1959)

Most wins by a jockey

- 8 – Jerry D. Bailey (1978, 1985, 1995, 1996, 1997, 1999, 2000, 2002)

Most wins by a trainer

- 8 – William I. Mott (1988, 1994, 1996, 1997, 1999, 2000, 2002, 2007)

Most wins by an owner

- 2 – Allen E. Paulson (1999, 2002)
- 2 – Kenneth L. and Sarah K. Ramsey (2000, 2018)

== Winners ==
Year	Winner	Age	Jockey	Trainer	Owner	Distance	Time	Purse	Grade	Ref
Fort Lauderdale Stakes
2025	Wolfie's Dynaghost	7	Irad Ortiz Jr.	Bryan A. Lynch	Woodslane Farm	1 1/8 miles	1:43.42	$200,000	III	
2024	Major Dude	4	Irad Ortiz Jr.	Todd A. Pletcher	Spendthrift Farm	1 1/8 miles	1:45.73	$200,000	II	
2023	Main Event	4	Javier Castellano	George Weaver	Harrell Ventures	1 1/8 miles	1:46.47	$200,000	II	
2022	City Man	5	Joel Rosario	Christophe Clement	Reeves Thoroughbred Racing, Peter & Patty Searles	1 1/8 miles	1:46.10	$200,000	II	
2021	Doswell	6	Junior Alvarado	Barclay Tagg	Joseph Allen	abt. 1 1/8 miles	1:45.60	$200,000	II	
2020	Largent	4	Paco Lopez	Todd A. Pletcher	Eclipse Thoroughbred Partners & Twin Creeks Racing Stables	1 1/8 miles	1:46.16	$200,000	II	
2019	Instilled Regard	4	Irad Ortiz Jr.	Chad C. Brown	OXO Equine	1 1/8 miles	1:47.18	$200,000	II	
2018†	Glorious Empire (IRE)	8	Edgar S. Prado	James L. Lawrence II	Matthew Schera	1 1/8 miles	1:48.44	$200,000	II	December
2018	Shining Copper	8	Jose L. Ortiz	Michael J. Maker	Kenneth L. and Sarah K. Ramsey	1 1/16 miles	1:43.44	$200,000	II	January
2017	Flatlined	5	Joe Bravo	Charles L. Dickey	Brian Hytrek, Rodney Paden & Ryan Kuhn	1 1/16 miles	1:41.29	$200,000	II	
2016	Heart to Heart	5	Julien R. Leparoux	Brian A. Lynch	Terry Hamilton	1 1/16 miles	1:41.71	$200,000	II	
2015	Mshawish	5	Javier Castellano	Todd A. Pletcher	Al Shaqab Racing	1 1/16 miles	1:41.14	$200,000	II	
2014	Summer Front	5	Joe Bravo	Christophe Clement	Waterford Stable	1 1/16 miles	1:42.24	$200,000	II	
2013	Mucho Mas Macho	4	Juan C. Leyva	Henry Collazo	Signal Hill Farms	1 1/16 miles	1:40.39	$150,000	II	
2012	Silver Medallion	4	Javier Castellano	Todd A. Pletcher	Black Rock Stables	1 1/16 miles	1:43.04	$100,000	III	
2011	Little Mike	4	Joe Bravo	Allen Iwinski	Priscilla Vaccarezza & KZ Stables	1 1/16 miles	1:40.52	$100,000	III	
2010	Duke of Mischief	4	Eibar Coa	David Fawkes	Alex Lieblong, Marilyn McMaster & David Fawkes	1 mile	1:37.70	$100,000	III	Off turf
2009	Kiss the Kid	6	Elvis Trujillo	Amy Tarrant	Amy Tarrant	1 1/16 miles	1:40.59	$100,000	Listed	
2008	Race not held									
2007	Classic Campaign	5	Edgar S. Prado	William I. Mott	Kinsman Stable	1 1/16 miles	1:40.19	$75,750	Listed	
2006	Honor in War	7	Shaun Bridgmohan	Paul J. McGee	3rd Turn Stables	1 1/16 miles	1:40.13	$75,000	Listed	
2005	Union Place	6	Javier Castellano	Randy Schulhofer	William A. Sorokolit Sr.	1 1/16 miles	1:38.26	$60,000		
2003–2004		Race not held								
Fort Lauderdale Handicap
2002	Del Mar Show	5	Jerry D. Bailey	William I. Mott	Allen E. Paulson Living Trust	1 1/16 miles	1:41.54	$100,000	III	
2001	Race not held									
2000	Beckon the King	4	Jerry D. Bailey	William I. Mott	Kenneth L. and Sarah K. Ramsey	1 1/16 miles	1:40.36	$100,000	III	
1999	Garbu	5	Jerry D. Bailey	William I. Mott	Allen E. Paulson	1 1/16 miles	1:39.33	$100,000	III	
1998	Statesmanship	4	Jose A. Santos	Christophe Clement	Peter F. Karches, Charles E. & Susan T. Harris	1 1/16 miles	1:40.46	$100,000	III	
1997	Doublethebetwice	4	Jerry D. Bailey	William I. Mott	Kevin B. Halter	1 1/16 miles	1:42.61	$100,000	III	
1996	Winged Victory	6	Jerry D. Bailey	William I. Mott	Pin Oak Stable	1 1/16 miles	1:41.94	$100,000	III	
1995	The Vid	5	Jerry D. Bailey	Martin D. Wolfson	Joseph J. Sullivan	1 1/16 miles	1:41.12	$100,000	III	
1994	Paradise Creek	5	Mike E. Smith	William I. Mott	Masayuki Nishiyama	1 1/16 miles	1:39.30	$100,000	Listed	
1993	Archies Laughter	5	Jose A. Santos	Milton W. Wolfson	Stride Rite Racing Stable	1 1/16 miles	1:44.13	$100,000	Listed	Off turf
1992	Now Listen	5	Jose A. Santos	Robert J. Frankel	Juddmonte Farms	1 1/16 miles	1:40.44	$100,000	Listed	
1991	ƒ Miss Josh	5	Dave Penna	Barclay Tagg	Bonner Farm	1 1/16 miles	1:41.13	$100,000	Listed	
1990	Wanderkin	7	Jose A. Santos	Richard O'Connell	Poma Stable	1 1/16 miles	1:40.60	$100,000		
1989	Regal Brek	7	Randy Romero	Mark R. Weiss	Selma L. Weiss, Glenda Salyer et al.	1 1/16 miles	1:44.20	$61,650		Off turf
1988	Lordalik (FR)	4	Randy Romero	Robert J. Frankel	Robert J. Frankel & Jerome S. Moss	1 1/16 miles	1:41.40	$49,150		Division 1
1988	Kings River II (IRE)	6	Randy Romero	William I. Mott	Bertram R. Firestone	1 1/16 miles	1:41.00	$50,150		Division 2
1987	Skip Trial	5	Randy Romero	Sonny Hine	Mrs. Zelda Cohen	1 1/16 miles	1:42.20	$59,500		
1986	Midway Circle	4	Jerry D. Bailey	Woodford C. Stephens	Jayeff B Stable	7 furlongs	1:23.00	$59,150		
1985	For Halo	4	Bryan Fann	Mary L. Edens	Mrs. Adele W. Paxson	7 furlongs	1:22.40	$56,800		
1984	Uncle Jeff	5	Gene St. Leon	Frank Gomez	Locust Lane Stable	1 1/16 miles	1:40.40	$44,205		
1983	Distinctive Pro	4	Craig Perret	Warren A. Croll Jr.	Aisco Stable & Howard Kaskel	7 furlongs	1:22.40	$42,735		
1982	Hat Room	4	Bryan Fann	Warren A. Croll Jr.	Blanche P. Levy	7 furlongs	1:22.60	$30,350		
1981	Race not held									
1980	Go With the Times	4	Craig Perret	Joseph M. Bollero	Russell L. Reineman Stable	7 furlongs	1:22.40	$29,300		
1979	Race not held									
1978	Poor Man's Bluff	4	Jerry D. Bailey	Joseph S. Nash	George A. Cavanaugh Jr.	1 1/16 miles	1:42.40	$29,150		
1977	Race not held									
1976	Enchumao (ARG)	5	Marco Castaneda	Grover W. Stephens	Miss Christine Mancuso	1 1/16 miles	1:43.40	$28,000		
1974–1975		Race not held								
1973	Gentle Smoke	5	Walter Blum	David Sazer	Forus Stable	1 1/16 miles	1:41.80	$20,000		
1972	Race not held									
1971	Rouge Chanteur	5	Thomas Barrow	Louis Goldfine	Leonard Prussky	1 1/16 miles	1:41.00	$20,000		
1970	Al Hattab	4	Walter Blum	Warren A. Croll Jr.	Pelican Stable	1 1/16 miles	1:42.40	$20,000		
1969	Addy Boy	4	William Gavidia	George Zateslo	Keystone Stable	1 1/16 miles	1:44.00	$15,000		
1968	Swoonaway	7	Jacinto Vasquez	S. Bryant Ott	E. Gay Drake	1 1/16 miles	1:43.80	$15,000		
1967	Cool Reception	3	Johnny Sellers	Louis C. Cavalaris Jr.	Mrs. J. W. Sietz & Mrs. V. P. Reid	1 1/16 miles	1:43.20	$15,000		
1966	Pollux	3	Ray Broussard	Douglas A. Dodson	Charles Parker	1 1/16 miles	1:44.00	$15,000		
Fort Lauderdale Purse
1965	Babington (ARG)	6	Michael Solomone	Arnold N. Winick	John M. Olin	1 1/16 miles	1:40.80	$10,000		
Fort Lauderdale Handicap
1964	Tumble Turbie	5	Larry Gilligan	H. G. Brockman	Tumblewood Stables	1 1/16 miles	1:43.60	$15,000		
1963	Valentine (GB)	5	Larry Gilligan	Harold O. Simmons	Louis Christopher	1 1/16 miles	1:43.20	$15,000		
1962	Cactus Tom	5	Johnny Sellers	H. C. Dodson	Natiolee Stable	1 1/16 miles	1:44.60	$15,000		
1961	Heroshogala	5	Howard Grant	Joe Brady	Mrs. Mary D. Keim	1 1/16 miles	1:43.60	$15,000		
1960	Captain Kidd II (GB)	4	Michael Solomone	Harris Brown	Mrs. Tilyou Christopher	1 1/16 miles	1:42.00	$15,000		
1959	Belleau Chief	4	Lois C. Cook	Edward B. Carpenter	Mrs. Lora Birr	1 1/16 miles	1:41.80	$15,000		
1958	§ Air Pilot	4	Frank Smith	Jim Conway	Mrs. Ada L. Rice	1 1/16 miles	1:42.20	$15,000		
1957	Needles	4	David Erb	Hugh L. Fontaine	D. & H. Stable	1 1/16 miles	1:42.00	$28,200		
1956	New Trend	4	William Shoemaker	Meshach Tenney	Rex. C. Ellsworth	1 1/16 miles	1:42.00	$10,000		
1955	Two Fisted	4	Ronnie Baldwin	Elmer Kalensky	Marvin E. Affelds	1 1/16 miles	1:43.40	$7,500		
1954	Amphiblen	6	William Cook	L.J. Keating	Jacnot Stable	1 1/16 miles	1:46.40	$10,000		Division 1
1954	Go A Bit	7	Walter B. Williams	Frank I. Wright	Tinkham Veale II	1 1/16 miles	1:46.00	$10,000		Division 2
1953	Elixir	5	Charles E. Burr	David J. Schneider	David J. Schneider	1 1/16 miles	1:43.40	$15,000		
1952	Thee and Me	4	Porter Roberts	Mose Shapoff	Samuel H. Popkin	1 1/16 miles	1:44.60	$7,500		
Fort Lauderdale Purse
1951	Black George	4	Logan Batcheller	Raymond Barnett	William H. Venneman	1 1/16 miles	1:43.00	$7,500		
1950	Sallequilo (ARG)	6	Fernando Fernandez	Thomas Bonham	Correll Stable	1 1/16 miles	1:43.80	$5,000		
Fort Lauderdale Handicap
1949	Big Dial	4	Antonio J. Fernandez	Ernest E. Hart	George B. Jacobson	1 1/16 miles	1:48.80	$7,500		
1947‡	Bug Juice	4	Joseph Licausi	Ralph W. McIlvian	Bermil Farm	1 1/16 miles	1:43.40	$15,000		December
1947	Eternal Reward	4	Jack Richards	Chester J. Hall	Louis Augustus & Charles Nahm	1 1/16 miles	1:45.40	$9,050		April

Legend:
Dirt Turf
Notes:
§ Ran as an entry
ƒ Filly or Mare
† In 2018 the event was held twice in the calendar year. For the 2017–18 meeting the event was held in January and in the 2018–19 meeting the event was held in December
‡ In 1947 the event was held twice in the calendar year. The inaugural running was held in April and for the 1947–48 season the event was scheduled in December

== See also ==
List of American and Canadian Graded races
