= Big Red Mike =

Canadian-bred Thoroughbred racehorse

- Sire: Tenpins
- Grandsire: Smart Strike
- Dam: Regent n'Flashy
- Damsire: Vice Regent
- Sex: Gelding
- Foaled: 2007
- Country: Canada
- Colour: Chestnut
- Breeder: Terra Farms, Ltd.
- Owner: Terra Racing Stable
- Trainer: Nicholas Gonzalez
- Record: 16: 4-3-3
- Earnings: Can$859,280

Major wins
- Plate Trial Stakes (2010) Canadian Classic Race wins: Queen's Plate (2010)
- Last updated on February 5, 2014

Big Red Mike (foaled 2007 in Ontario) is a Canadian Thoroughbred racehorse. He won the 2010 Queen's Plate, Canada's most prestigious race and North America's oldest annually run stakes race. He was bred by Dom Romeo's Terra Farms, and raced by his nom de course, Terra Racing Stable.

Trained by Nick Gonzalez, leading up to the 151st edition of the Queen's Plate, Big Red Mike won the Plate Trial Stakes on June 13.
