= Bruce's Mill Conservation Area =

Conservation area in Ontario, Canada

Coordinates: 43.946°N 79.349°W

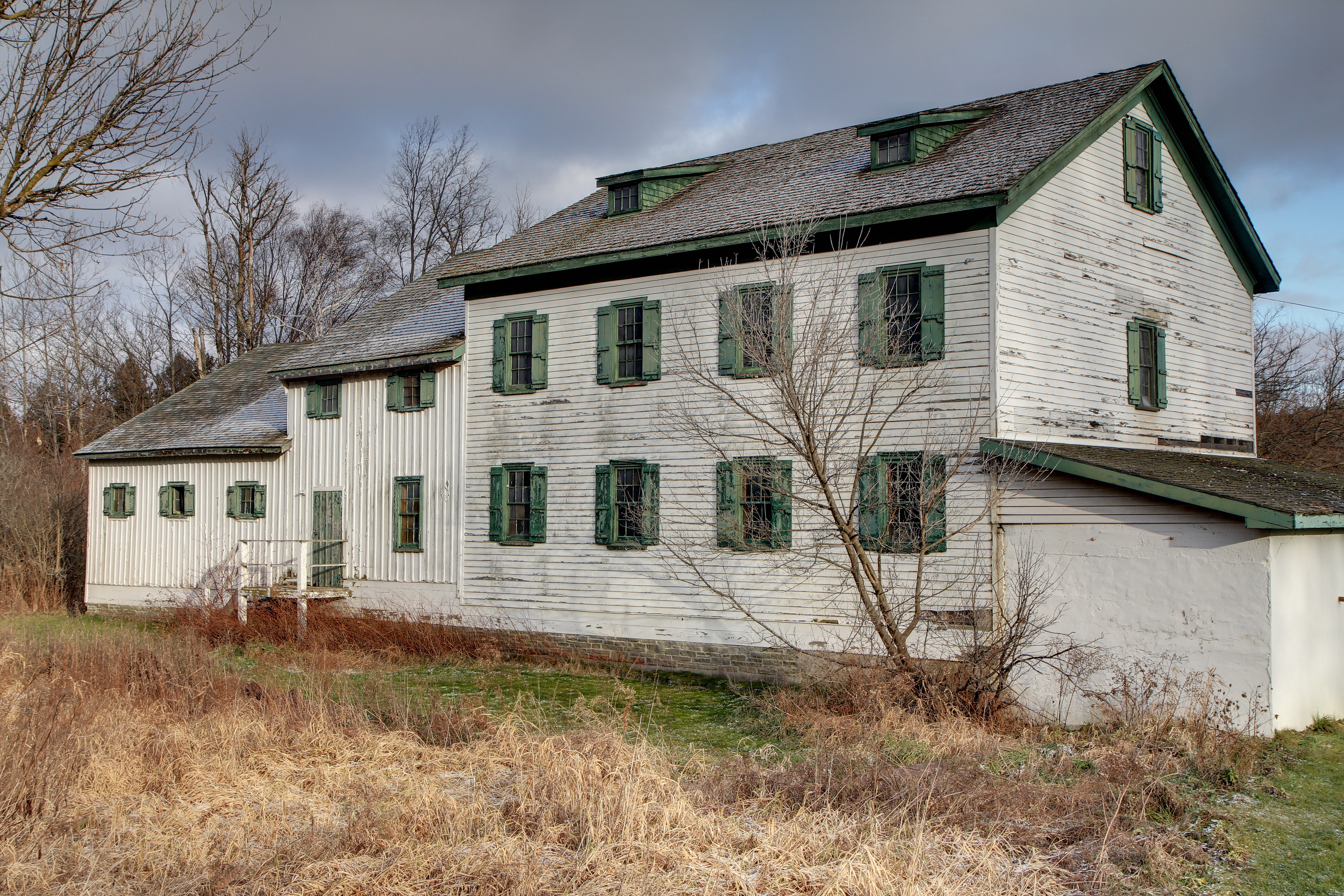
- The second mill, built in 1858, that replaced the original built in 1829
- Interactive map of Bruce's Mill Conservation Area
- Location: Whitchurch–Stouffville
- Nearest city: Stouffville
- Created: 1961
- Operator: Toronto and Region Conservation Authority
- Owner: Toronto and Region Conservation Authority

Bruce's Mill Conservation Area (BMCA) is a conservation area located off Stouffville Road in the town of Whitchurch–Stouffville, Ontario, Canada. The conservation area is about 108 hectares (267 acres) in size. BMCA is home to a diverse ecosystem, including 1.2 hectares of wetlands and 44 hectares of deciduous, coniferous and mixed forest. It is owned and managed by the Toronto and Region Conservation Authority (TRCA).

BMCA was established in 1961, after 52.6 hectares of land were purchased by the then Metropolitan Toronto and Region Conservation Authority. At the time, several buildings and a road system existed on the land. Today, the only historic buildings that remain include the mill attendant's house and the water-powered mill building.

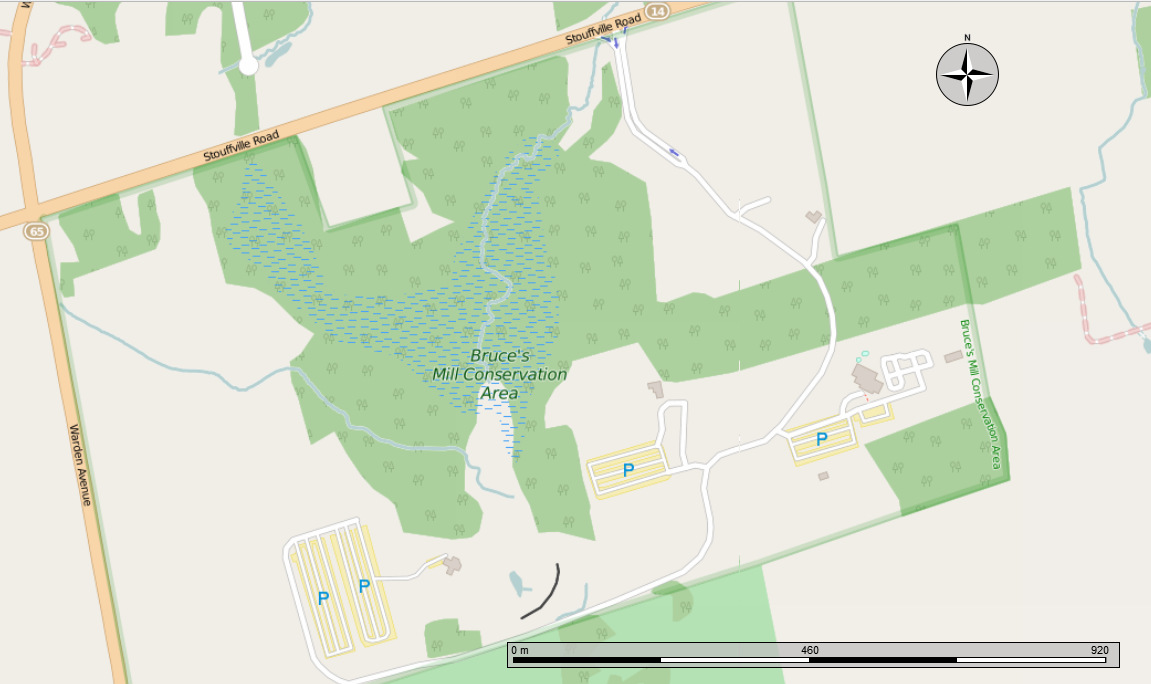
Map of the Conservation Area.

BMCA offers visitors an array of activities and attractions, including picnicking, hiking, soccer and baseball fields, a golf driving range, bird watching, nature viewing, a Treetop Trekking aerial course and a BMX track.

The park's regular operating season runs from mid-April to Thanksgiving weekend each year, weather permitting. During the regular season, people can enter the park for free during weekdays, but must pay a small fee for weekend visits. Large groups of people can also choose to book a private onsite picnic area if they wish. The park also opens briefly in early spring for the Sugarbush Maple Syrup Festival.

== Hiking ==
There are about 10 km of recreational hiking trails at BMCA, shown on provided trail maps.

== Sugarbush Maple Syrup Festival ==
Since 1966, the Sugarbush Maple Syrup Festival has been held at BMCA. TRCA also runs the festival at the Kortright Centre for Conservation. It is the longest-running maple syrup festival in the GTA, running for 5–6 weeks each year, depending on the weather. Visitors see demonstrations of the various methods that have been used to make maple syrup throughout Canadian history. This includes Native Canadian, pioneer, and modern-day maple syrup production methods. There are also a variety of family activities, such as horse-and-carriage rides, face painting, a petting zoo and pancake meals.

== Treetop trekking ==
In June 2014, the park unveiled an aerial ropes and zip-line course located within BMCA. It offers 5 aerial courses for users 9 years and older.

The park also has Treewalk Village; a treefort adventure for kids aged 5 and under.

== Picnics ==
BMCA offers twelve picnic sites that can be booked for large picnics and events. The capacity of the sites ranges from 100-300+ people.

== BMX track ==
In the fall of 2014, the town of Whitchurch-Stouffville opened a BMX course at BMCA. This is the only BMX track located in York Region. It is a cycling-only facility and no motorized vehicles are permitted on the course.

== Private functions ==
Bruce's Mill Chalet/Pancake House is located in what used to be a sugarbush. The chalet holds about 60 people.

== Community Safety village ==
Also located on the Bruce's Mill property is a Community Safety Village, managed by York Regional Police, an educational facility that teaches young people about fire, traffic and personal safety.
