= Bunty Lawless =

Canadian-bred Thoroughbred racehorse

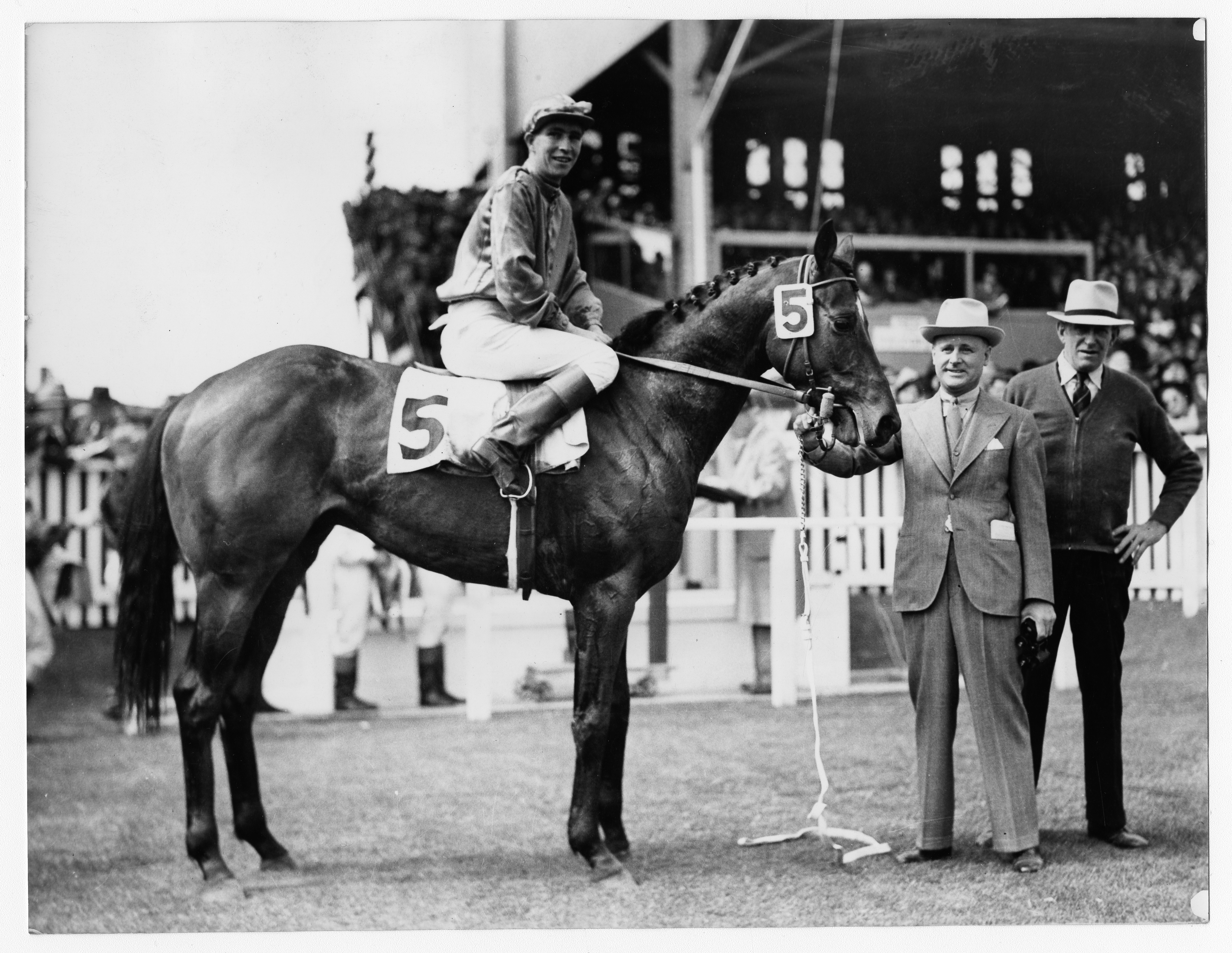
- Racehorse Bunty Lawless, 29 June 1939
- Sire: Ladder
- Grandsire: Ladkin
- Dam: Mintwina
- Damsire: Mint Briar
- Sex: Stallion
- Foaled: 1935
- Country: Canada
- Colour: Bay
- Breeder: William F. Morrissey
- Owner: William F. Morrissey
- Trainer: Jack Anderson; Pete McCann (age 6)
- Record: 47: 19-15-3
- Earnings: $34,379

Major wins
- Clarendon Plate (1937); Bennington Handicap (1938); Canadian Championship Stakes (1938, 1941) Canadian Classic Race wins: King's Plate (1938)

Honours
- Canadian Horse Racing Hall of Fame (1976); Voted "Canadian Horse of the Half Century"; Bunty Lawless Stakes at Woodbine Racetrack

Bunty Lawless (1935–1956) was a Canadian Thoroughbred racehorse who in 1951 was voted Canada's "Horse of the Half-Century".

== Racing career ==
Racing during the Great Depression of the 1930s, Bunty Lawless competed for purse money that was very small. At age two, he finished first or second in all but one of his ten races. The one time he was out of the money that year was in the Cup and Saucer Stakes, when his equipment broke. In 1938, the horse was the top 3-year-old in Canada, and his victory in the King's Plate, his country's most prestigious race, was enormously popular with the public. In an era when millionaires still dominated Thoroughbred horse racing, the owner and breeder of Bunty Lawless was the opposite. The working man's hero, Willie Morrissey grew up penniless in the poorest section of Toronto, worked as a newsboy, then became a successful hotel owner and boxing promoter. At the race track, he sat in the cheap grandstand seats with the rest of the crowd and was frowned upon by the aristocratic elite owners in their top hats and tails, seated in their exclusive viewing boxes.

After winning the King's Plate, Bunty Lawless ran second to future Hall of Fame inductee Mona Bell in the 1938 Breeders' Stakes, then won the Canadian Championship Stakes. Taken south of the border, he won the August 20th Bennington Handicap at Saratoga Race Course.

== Stud record ==
Retired to stud, Bunty Lawless proved an exceptional sire and was Canada's leading sire four times. His offspring includes 1949 King's Plate winner Epic and 1946 Breeders' Stakes winner Windfields, for whom E. P. Taylor named his famous farm. Bunty Lawless is also the grandsire of Mint Copy, the dam of Deputy Minister, who became an influential sire whose descendants include the famed fillies Open Mind (winner of the 1988 Breeders' Cup Juvenile Fillies and 1989 Triple Tiara) and Go For Wand (winner of the 1989 Breeders' Cup Juvenile Fillies). His other descendants include Canadian Horse of the Year and Hall of Fame inductee Victoria Park.

== Sire line tree ==
- Bunty Lawless
  - Windfields
    - Canadian Champ
      - Canebora
      - Titled Hero
  - Epic
  - McGill

== Pedigree ==
Pedigree of Bunty Lawless, chestnut colt, 1935
Sire Ladder	Ladkin	Fair Play	Hastings
Sire Ladder	Ladkin	Fair Play	Fairy Gold
Sire Ladder	Ladkin	Lading	Negofol
Sire Ladder	Ladkin	Lading	Lady Amelia
Sire Ladder	Panoply	Peter Pan	Commando*
Sire Ladder	Panoply	Peter Pan	Cinderella
Sire Ladder	Panoply	Inaugural	Voter
Sire Ladder	Panoply	Inaugural	Court Dress
Dam Mintwina	Mint Briar	Assagai	Spearmint
Dam Mintwina	Mint Briar	Assagai	Charm
Dam Mintwina	Mint Briar	Sweet Briar	St. Frusquin
Dam Mintwina	Mint Briar	Sweet Briar	Presentation
Dam Mintwina	Edwina	Celt	Commando*
Dam Mintwina	Edwina	Celt	Maid of Erin
Dam Mintwina	Edwina	Lady Godiva	Hanover
Dam Mintwina	Edwina	Lady Godiva	Edith Gray (family: 10-c)

* Bunty Lawless is inbred 4S × 4D to the stallion Commando, meaning that he appears fourth generation on the sire side of his pedigree and fourth generation on the dam side of his pedigree.
