= Titled Hero =

Thoroughbred racehorse

- Sire: Canadian Champ
- Grandsire: Windfields
- Dam: Countess Angela
- Damsire: Bull Page
- Sex: Stallion
- Foaled: 1963
- Country: Canada
- Colour: Black
- Breeder: E. P. Taylor
- Owner: Peter K. Marshall
- Trainer: Patrick MacMurchy
- Record: 34: 16-5-3
- Earnings: $214,690

Major wins
- Colin Stakes (1965); Summer Stakes (1965); Grey Stakes (1965); Coronation Futurity Stakes (1965); Friar Rock Stakes (1966); Plate Trial Stakes (1966) Canadian Classic Race wins: Queen's Plate (1966); Breeders' Stakes (1966)

Titled Hero (foaled 1963 in Ontario) was a Canadian Thoroughbred racehorse. Bred by renowned Canadian horseman, E. P. Taylor, his sire Canadian Champ and his grandsire Windfields were both Canadian Horse Racing Hall of Fame inductees. Out of the mare Countess Angela, his damsire was Bull Page, the 1951 Canadian Horse of the Year and the leading sire in Canada in 1958. Titled Hero was purchased for $15,000 in 1964 by Peter K. Marshall at the annual Windfields Farm yearling sale.

His trainer, Patrick MacMurchy, had trained 1957 Canadian Horse of the Year Hartney, and won the 1961 Queen's Plate with Blue Light. At age two, Titled Hero won eight of his twelve starts. In the two most important stakes races for juveniles in Canada, he ran second on the turf in the 1965 Cup and Saucer Stakes and won the Coronation Futurity Stakes on dirt.

As a three-year-old in 1966, Titled Hero won the Friar Rock Stakes, the Plate Trial Stakes, and then the most important race of his career and Canada's most prestigious race, the Queen's Plate. Titled Hero went on to win the Breeders' Stakes on turf.

Titled Hero was euthanized following a serious injury in 1967.
