= Canadian International Stakes =

Horse race in Toronto, Ontario, Canada

- Class: Grade 1
- Location: Woodbine Racetrack; Toronto, Canada
- Inaugurated: 1938
- Race type: Thoroughbred – Flat racing
- Website: Canadian International Stakes

Race information
- Distance: 1 1/2 miles
- Surface: Turf
- Track: Left-handed
- Qualification: 3-Years-Old & Up
- Weight: Weight-For-Age
- Purse: CA$750,000

The Canadian International Stakes is a Grade I stakes race for thoroughbred racehorses from three years of age and upwards on Turf. It is held annually at Woodbine Racetrack in Toronto, Ontario, Canada. The current purse is CA$750,000.

== History ==
The Canadian International Stakes was founded in 1938 as the Long Branch Championship. The first race was held at the Long Branch Racetrack in Etobicoke. The race was run on dirt and was restricted to Canadian-bred three-year-olds. The Race was renamed the Canadian International Stakes in 1939, and was restricted to Canadian-owned horses. The Race was opened to horses of all ages in 1940, though the owner still had to be a Canadian resident. The eligibility was revised to ages three and up with no residence restriction in 1954. During World War II, Long Branch Racetrack did not operate, and the Race was held at Dufferin Racetrack. Long Branch Racetrack closed in 1956, and the Race moved to Woodbine Racetrack. The Race became a turf race in 1958. The Race name changed to Canadian International Championship Stakes from 1966 to 1980. The Race name changed to Rothmans International from 1981 to 1995 for its sponsor, the Canadian subsidiary of the Rothmans International plc. The Race changed the sponsor to Pattison Outdoor Advertising.

On dirt:

- 1938–1941 : 1 1/16 miles at Long Branch Racetrack
- 1942–1945 : 1 1/16 miles at Dufferin Racetrack
- 1946–1952 : 1 1/16 miles at Long Branch Racetrack
- 1953–1954 : 1 1/8 miles at Long Branch Racetrack
- 1955 1 3/16 miles at Long Branch Racetrack
- 1956–1957 : 1 5/8 miles at Woodbine Racetrack

On turf at Woodbine Racetrack:

- 1958–1986 1 5/8 miles
- 1987–1993 1 1/2 miles (Out of Chute, inside of the main track)
- 1994–2021 1 1/2 miles (One complete circuit outside of the main track)
- 2023 1 1/4 miles
- 2025–present 1 1/2 miles

Winners have come from breeding farms in Canada, the United States, Ireland, the United Kingdom, France, and Argentina. The Canadian International has been contested by many of the horses, jockeys, and trainers in thoroughbred racing history worldwide. Its success as a North American race drew an international field, helped inspire the creation of the Breeders' Cup races in 1984, which were held at Woodbine in 1996.

Many notable horses have won the Canadian International. The most renowned renewal was in 1973 when the Canadian International was the final race for Secretariat. His 6 1/2-lengths victory is the widest winning margin in the race's history. Other notable winners include Bunty Lawless, voted "Canadian Horse of the Half Century," who won in 1938 and 1941. Dahlia became the first European-based horse to win the race, becoming the first horse to win Group / Grade One stakes in England, France, Ireland, Canada, and the U.S. In 1974.

Eclipse Award voting began in 1971. Eight winners of the International were named Champion Turf Horse for that year: Secretariat (1973), Dahlia (1974), Snow Knight (1975), Youth (1976), Mac Diarmida (1978), All Along (1983), Singspiel (1996), and Chief Bearhart (1997).

In 2005, the purse for the race was increased to CA$2 million to help attract European horses who did not choose to enter the Breeders' Cup Turf. The purse was reduced to CA$1.5 million in 2011, then to CA$1 million in 2013, and to CA$800,000 in 2017.

The Canadian International was not run in 2020 due to the COVID-19 pandemic. The 2022 race was also scrapped due to COVID-related logistical issues that made it difficult for overseas horses to travel to Canada at the time. The race returned in 2023 at a shorter distance of 1 1/4 miles for a purse of CA$750,000. Woodbine shelved the Canadian International again for 2024; track management stated that running the race that year was not viable in part due to difficulties with available cargo flights that would allow European horses to compete.

== Records ==
Time record: (Turf)

- 1 5/8 miles: 2:40.00 – Dahlia (1974)
- 1 1/2 miles: 2:25.60 – Raintrap (1994)
- 1 1/4 miles: 2:03.65 – Nations Pride (2023)

Most wins:

- 3 – Joshua Tree (2010, 2012, 2013)
- 2 – Bunty Lawless (1938, 1941)
- 2 – Shepperton (1942, 1943)
- 2 – George Royal (1965, 1966)
- 2 – Majesty's Prince (1982, 1984)
- 2 – Desert Encounter (2018, 2019)

Most wins by an owner:

- 5 – Godolphin (2000, 2004, 2021, 2023, 2026)
- 4 – E. P. Taylor / Windfields Farm (1950, 1951, 1953, 1975)
- 3 – Nelson Bunker Hunt (1974, 1976, 1977)

Most wins by a jockey:

- 4 – Frankie Dettori (2000, 2004, 2012, 2021)
- 3 – Bobby Watson (1942, 1943, 1944)
- 3 – Ryan Moore (2013, 2014, 2015)

Most wins by a trainer:

- 3 – Gordon J. McCann (1941, 1951, 1953)
- 3 – Horatio Luro (1956, 1957, 1971)
- 3 – Maurice Zilber (1974, 1976, 1977)
- 3 – Michael Stoute (1996, 2014, 2015)
- 3 – Charlie Appleby (2021, 2023, 2026)

== Winners ==
Year	Winner	Age	Jockey	Trainer	Owner	Dist. (m) (t) / (d)	Time	Win$	Ref
2026	Arabian Crown	5	Jamie Spencer	Charlie Appleby	Godolphin	11/2 M (t)	2:30.67	$750,000	
2025	Silawi	5	Faleh Nasser Bughenaim	H.A. Al Jehani	Wathnan Racing	11/2 M (t)	2:27.52	$750,000	
2024	Not run								
2023	Nations Pride	4	William Buick	Charlie Appleby	Godolphin	11/4 M (t)	2:03.65	$750,000	
2022	Not run								
2021	Walton Street	7	Frankie Dettori	Charlie Appleby	Godolphin	11/2 M (t)	2:29.07	$360,000	
2020	Not run								
2019	Desert Encounter	7	Andrea Atzeni	David Simcock	Abdulla Al Mansoori	11/2 M (t)	2:28.62	$480,000	
2018	Desert Encounter	6	Andrea Atzeni	David Simcock	Abdulla Al Mansoori	11/2 M (t)	2:28.88	$480,000	
2017	Bullards Alley	5	Eurico Rosa Da Silva	Tim Glyshaw	Wayne Spalding & Faron McCubbins	11/2 M (t)	2:34.37	$480,000	
2016	Erupt	4	Stéphane Pasquier	Francis-Henri Graffard	Niarchos family	11/2 M (t)	2:30.87	$600,000	
2015	Cannock Chase	4	Ryan Moore	Michael Stoute	Saeed Suhail	11/2 M (t)	2:29.26	$600,000	
2014	Hillstar	4	Ryan Moore	Michael Stoute	Evelyn de Rothschild	11/2 M (t)	2:29.00	$600,000	
2013	Joshua Tree	6	Ryan Moore	Ed Dunlop	K. K. Nabooda & K. Albahou	11/2 M (t)	2:35.45	$600,000	
2012	Joshua Tree	5	Frankie Dettori	Marco Botti	K. K. Nabooda & K. Albahou	11/2 M (t)	2:30.89	$900,000	
2011	Sarah Lynx	4	Christophe Soumillon	John Hammond	Mrs. Robert G. Ehrnooth	11/2 M (t)	2:34.90	$900,000	
2010	Joshua Tree	3	Colm O'Donoghue	Aidan O'Brien	D. Smith, S. Magnier, M. Tabor	11/2 M (t)	2:32.72	$1,200,000	
2009	Champs Elysees	6	Garrett Gomez	Robert J. Frankel	Juddmonte Farms	11/2 M (t)	2:28.36	$1,200,000	
2008	Marsh Side	5	Javier Castellano	Neil D. Drysdale	Robert S. Evans	11/2 M (t)	2:28.73	$1,200,000	
2007	Cloudy's Knight	7	Ramsey Zimmerman	Frank J. Kirby	S J Stables LLC	11/2 M (t)	2:27.71	$1,200,000	
2006	Collier Hill	8	Dean McKeown	Alan Swinbank	R. Hall, D. Abell, R. Crowe	11/2 M (t)	2:37.34	$1,200,000	
2005	Relaxed Gesture	4	Corey Nakatani	Christophe Clement	Moyglare Stud	11/2 M (t)	2:32.64	$1,200,000	
2004	Sulamani	5	Frankie Dettori	Saeed bin Suroor	Godolphin	11/2 M (t)	2:28.64	$900,000	
2003	Phoenix Reach	3	Martin Dwyer	Andrew Balding	Winterbeck Manor Stud	11/2 M (t)	2:33.62	$900,000	
2002	Ballingarry	3	Michael Kinane	Aidan O'Brien	Coolmore Stud	11/2 M (t)	2:31.68	$900,000	
2001	Mutamam	6	Richard Hills	Alec Stewart	Shadwell Racing	11/2 M (t)	2:28.46	$900,000	
2000	Mutafaweq	4	Frankie Dettori	Saeed bin Suroor	Godolphin	11/2 M (t)	2:27.62	$900,000	
1999	Thornfield	5	Richard Dos Ramos	Phil England	Knob Hill Stable	11/2 M (t)	2:32.39	$936,000	
1998	Royal Anthem	3	Gary Stevens	Henry Cecil	The Thoroughbred Corp.	11/2 M (t)	2:29.60	$630,000	
1997	Chief Bearhart	4	José A. Santos	Mark Frostad	Sam-Son Farm	11/2 M (t)	2:29.00	$600,000	
1996	Singspiel	4	Gary Stevens	Michael Stoute	Sheikh Mohammed	11/2 M (t)	2:33.20	$600,000	
1995	Lassigny	4	Pat Day	William I. Mott	Prince Sultan al Kabeer	11/2 M (t)	2:29.80	$653,250	
1994	Raintrap	4	Robbie Davis	André Fabre	Juddmonte Farms	11/2 M (t)	2:25.60	$606,900	
1993	Husband	3	Cash Asmussen	John Fellows	Keswick Stables	11/2 M (t)	2:36.40	$623,100	
1992	Snurge *	5	Richard Quinn	Paul Cole	Martyn Arbib	11/2 M (t)	2:39.00	$636,000	
1991	Sky Classic	4	Pat Day	Jim Day	Sam-Son Farm	11/2 M (t)	2:27.80	$624,750	
1990	French Glory	4	Pat Eddery	André Fabre	Juddmonte Farms	11/2 M (t)	2:34.80	$619,650	
1989	Hodges Bay	4	Jean Cruguet	Willard C. Freeman	George E. Robb	11/2 M (t)	2:33.80	$575,400	
1988	Infamy	4	Ray Cochrane	Luca Cumani	Gerald W. Leigh	11/2 M (t)	2:29.00	$508,680	
1987	River Memories	3	Chris McCarron	Robert Collet	Alan Clore	11/2 M (t)	2:32.80	$456,900	
1986	Southjet	3	José A. Santos	Angel Penna Sr.	Dogwood Stable	15/8 M (t)	2:54.60	$421,500	
1985	Nassipour	5	Jean-Luc Samyn	Stephen A. DiMauro	Dogwood Stable	15/8 M (t)	2:48.20	$360,000	
1984	Majesty's Prince	5	Laffit Pincay Jr.	Joseph B. Cantey	John D. Marsh	15/8 M (t)	2:42.80	$360,000	
1983	All Along	4	Walter Swinburn	Patrick Biancone	Daniel Wildenstein	15/8 M (t)	2:45.00	$312,210	
1982	Majesty's Prince	3	Eddie Maple	Joseph B. Cantey	John D. Marsh	15/8 M (t)	2:49.40	$251,790	
1981	Open Call	3	Jorge Velásquez	John M. Gaver Jr.	Greentree Stable	15/8 M (t)	2:53.40	$185,250	
1980	Great Neck	4	Mike Venezia	Jan H. Nerud	Tartan Stable	15/8 M (t)	2:42.60	$120,000	
1979	Golden Act	3	Sandy Hawley	Loren Rettele	W. Oldknow/R. W. Phipps	15/8 M (t)	2:48.60	$120,000	
1978	Mac Diarmida	3	Jean Cruguet	Scotty Schulhofer	Jerome M. Torsney	15/8 M (t)	2:41.20	$111,180	
1977	Exceller	4	Ángel Cordero Jr.	Maurice Zilber	Nelson Bunker Hunt	15/8 M (t)	2:52.40	$116,100	
1976	Youth	3	Sandy Hawley	Maurice Zilber	Nelson Bunker Hunt	15/8 M (t)	2:48.00	$114,600	
1975	Snow Knight	4	Jorge Velásquez	MacKenzie Miller	Windfields Farm	15/8 M (t)	2:43.20	$113,220	
1974	Dahlia	4	Lester Piggott	Maurice Zilber	Nelson Bunker Hunt	15/8 M (t)	2:40.00	$91,650	
1973	Secretariat	3	Eddie Maple	Lucien Laurin	Meadow Stable	15/8 M (t)	2:41.80	$92,755	
1972	Droll Role	4	Braulio Baeza	Thomas J. Kelly	John M. Schiff	15/8 M (t)	2:51.80	$52,330	
1971	One For All	5	Ron Turcotte	Horatio Luro	John A. Bell lll	15/8 M (t)	2:45.20	$41,550	
1970	Drumtop	4	Chuck Baltazar	Roger Laurin	James B. Moseley	15/8 M (t)	2:50.80	$39,900	
1969	Vent du Nord *	4	Rudy L. Turcotte	Al Scotti	Emanuel Mittman	15/8 M (t)	2:47.20	$45,000	
1968	Frenetico	4	Robin Platts	Lou Cavalaris Jr.	Gardiner Farm	15/8 M (t)	2:49.20	$30,900	
1967	He's A Smoothie	4	Samuel McComb	Warren Beasley	William R. Beasley	15/8 M (t)	2:59.60	$34,500	
1966	George Royal	5	Ismael Valenzuela	Donald Richardson	Hammond & Hall	15/8 M (t)	2:42.40	$32,700	
1965	George Royal	4	Johnny Longden	Donald Richardson	Hammond & Hall	15/8 M (t)	3:05.40	$35,800	
1964	Will I Rule	4	Ron Turcotte	Joe Nash	Fitz Eugene Dixon Jr.	15/8 M (t)	2:47.80	$34,800	
1963	The Axe II	5	John L. Rotz	John M. Gaver Sr.	Greentree Stable	15/8 M (t)	2:41.00	$35,600	
1962	El Bandito	5	Ray Broussard	Joseph H. Pierce Jr.	Edward Seltzer	15/8 M (t)	2:50.80	$35,700	
1961	Our Jeep	4	Sam Boulmetis Sr.	Oleg Dubassoff	John M. Schiff	15/8 M (t)	2:45.80	$32,500	
1960	Rocky Royale	4	Kenneth Church	Paul L. Kelley	Spring Hill Farm	15/8 M (t)	2:42.20	$35,400	
1959	Martini II	5	Charles Clark	Harry Trotsek	Hasty House Farm	15/8 M (t)	2:56.00	$33,000	
1958	Jack Ketch	4	Johnny Sellers	Harry Trotsek	Hasty House Farm	15/8 M (t)	2:46.60	$34,900	
1957	Spinney	4	Juan Sanchez	Horatio Luro	Louis R. Rowan	15/8 M (d)	2:46.20	$42,300	
1956	Eugenia II	4	Juan Sanchez	Horatio Luro	W. Arnold Hanger	15/8 M (d)	2:43.40	$42,700	
1955	Park Dandy	5	Bobby Ussery	Pat Brady	William J. Beattie	13/16 M (d)	2:00.80	$34,524	
1954	Resilient	4	Bennie Green	H. W. Williams	Killian Farms	11/8 M (d)	1:54.00	$23,075	
1953	Navy Page	3	Nick Shuk	Gordon J. McCann	E. P. Taylor	11/8 M (d)	1:53.20	$10,875	
1952	Beau Dandy	7	Anthony Licata	R. Anderson	Wilma Kennedy	11/16 M (d)	1:46.00	$5,225	
1951	Bull Page	4	Jose Vina	Gordon J. McCann	E. P. Taylor	11/16 M (d)	1:49.00	$5,090	
1950	Nephisto	3	Pat Remillard	Arthur Brent	E. P. Taylor	11/16 M (d)	1:46.80	$4,810	
1949	Arise	3	Douglas Dodson	James C. Bentley	Addison Stable	11/16 M (d)	1:46.80	$4,800	
1948	Canada's Teddy	4	David H. Prater	Morris Fishman	Mrs. Morris Fishman	11/16 M (d)	1:48.00	$3,910	
1947	Brown Hostess	4	Len Stroud	William Thurner	Charles H. Hempstead	11/16 M (d)	1:46.20	$2,550	
1946	Kingarvie	3	Johnny Dewhurst	Arthur Brent	Parkwood Stable	11/16 M (d)	1:51.40	$2,770	
1945	Tulachmore	5	Pat Remillard	William E. MacDonald	MacDonald Stable	11/16 M (d)	1:55.40	$2,900	
1944	Be Brief	4	Robert B. Watson	Cecil Howard	Harry C. Hatch	11/16 M (d)	1:47.60	$1,768	
1943	Shepperton	4	Robert B. Watson	Fred H. Schelke	Fred H. Schelke	11/16 M (d)	1:51.80	$3,326	
1942	Shepperton	3	Robert B. Watson	Fred H. Schelke	Fred H. Schelke	11/16 M (d)	1:52.40	$1,876	
1941	Bunty Lawless	6	Tom Aimers	Gordon J. McCann	Willie F. Morrissey	11/16 M (d)	1:49.20	$3,354	
1940	Cerisse III	7	Harry Meynell	A. Bennie	Art J. Halliwell	11/16 M (d)	1:46.00	$1,400	
1939	Sir Marlboro	3	Charlie McTague	Walter E. Coburn	Conn Smythe	11/16 M (d)	1:48.00	$2,450	
1938	Bunty Lawless	3	Tom Aimers	Jack Anderson	Willie F. Morrissey	11/16 M (d)	1:45.80	$2,125	

- In 1969, Tradesman won but was disqualified and placed last.
- In 1992, Wiorno finished first but was disqualified and placed third.

== See also ==
- List of Canadian flat horse races
