= Canadian Champ =

Canadian-bred Thoroughbred racehorse

- Sire: Windfields
- Grandsire: Bunty Lawless
- Dam: Bolesteo
- Damsire: Filisteo
- Sex: Stallion
- Foaled: 1953
- Country: Canada
- Colour: Bay
- Breeder: E. P. Taylor
- Owner: W. R. "Bill" Beasley
- Trainer: John Passero
- Record: 42: 20-11-3
- Earnings: $151,705

Major wins
- Coronation Futurity Stakes (1955); Cup and Saucer Stakes (1955); Achievement Handicap (1956); Seagram Cup (1956); Plate Trial Stakes (1956); Queen's Plate (1956); Prince of Wales Stakes (1956); Breeders' Stakes (1956); Swynford Stakes (1957)

Awards
- 5th Canadian Triple Crown Champion (1956); Canadian Horse of the Year (1956)

Honours
- Canadian Horse Racing Hall of Fame (2007)
- Last updated on September 17, 2007

Canadian Champ (1953–1978) was a Canadian Thoroughbred Hall of Fame racehorse who in 1956 won the three races that became the Canadian Triple Crown Championship in 1959. Sired by Canadian Horse Racing Hall of Fame inductee Windfields, he was out of the mare Bolesteo.

Trained by John Passero, during his racing career Canadian Champ set three track records at Woodbine Racetrack and equalled another there as well as at Gulfstream Park in Florida. In his two-year-old season, he won 1955's Coronation Futurity Stakes and the Cup and Saucer Stakes, the two most important races for his age group in Canada. Sent south to Saratoga Race Course, he ran second in the United States Hotel Stakes to Cornelius Vanderbilt Whitney's colt Career Boy. The following year, he won Canada's most prestigious race, the Queen's Plate, as well as the Prince of Wales Stakes and the Breeders' Stakes, which constituted the Triple Crown series created three years later. His 1956 performances earned Canadian Champ Canadian Horse of the Year honours, and he retired as the richest Thoroughbred in Canadian racing history. Canadian Champ was ridden by jockeys David Stevenson and Eugene Rodriguez.

When he raced in 1957 at age four, Canadian Champ's best results were a win in the Swynford Stakes at Woodbine Racetrack and three stakes race seconds.

== Stud record ==
Standing at E. P. Taylor's Windfields Farm in Oshawa, Ontario, between 1959 and 1968, Canadian Champ notably sired the 1963 Canadian Triple Crown winner, Canebora, and the 1966 Queen's Plate winner, Titled Hero.

In 1969, he was sent to a breeding operation in Japan, where he died in 1978 at the age of twenty-five.

In 2007, Canadian Champ was inducted into the Canadian Horse Racing Hall of Fame.
