= Charles P. B. Taylor =

Canadian writer and racehorse owner

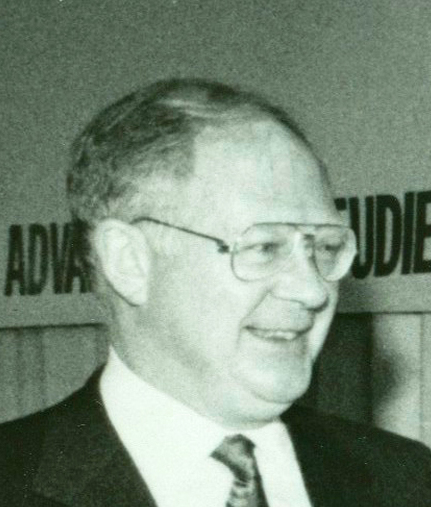
- Taylor in 1987
- Born: 1935; Ottawa, Ontario, Canada
- Died: July 8, 1997 (aged 61–62)
- Education: Queen's University
- Occupations: Journalist; author; essayist; racehorse owner/breeder
- Spouse: Noreen Taylor
- Parents: E. P. Taylor; Winnifred Thornton Duguid

Charles Plunket Bourchier Taylor (1935–1997) was a Canadian journalist, author, essayist, and thoroughbred racehorse owner and breeder.

== Life and career ==
Taylor was born in 1935 in Ottawa, Ontario. While studying at Queen's University in Kingston, Ontario, Taylor was part of the student broadcast team on CFRC, the campus radio station. He went on to work for Reuters news service in London, England, from 1955 until 1962, when he joined the staff of The Globe and Mail newspaper in Toronto. His career in journalism saw him become the paper's bureau chief in British Hong Kong, Peking, China, and London, England. He reported from numerous countries around the world, providing coverage of major events including the Vietnam War, the Nigerian Civil War, and the Arab–Israeli conflict.

Taylor wrote Reporter in Red China (1966) and edited China Hands (1984), books based on experiences in the Far East. The author of four books and several plays, in later years he served as Chairman of the Writers' Union of Canada.

Following his death in 1997, his widow Noreen created the Charles Taylor Foundation, whose work includes the funding of the Charles Taylor Prize, a $25,000 literary prize awarded annually since 2000 to the best Canadian work of literary non-fiction.

== Thoroughbred horse racing ==
The son of renowned horseman E. P. Taylor and brother to bookseller Judith Taylor Mappin, Charles Taylor took over the running of Windfields Farm in the early 1980s, following his father's incapacitation from a stroke. A major horse breeding and racing operation based in Oshawa, Ontario, Windfields Farm also ran a breeding farm in Chesapeake City, Maryland. The Canadian farm is the birthplace of racing great and champion sire Northern Dancer, called by the National Thoroughbred Racing Association as "one of the most influential sires in Thoroughbred history."

In addition to breeding and racing horses, Taylor played a significant role in North American Thoroughbred racing. He served as chairman of the Jockey Club of Canada, was a Trustee of the Ontario Jockey Club, and both a Provincial and National Director of the Canadian Thoroughbred Owners and Breeders Association. Taylor was also a founding director and vice-president of Breeders' Cup Ltd., a Director of the Keeneland Association, and a member of The Jockey Club, the authority for all Thoroughbred horses in North America and Puerto Rico. Internationally, he was a member of the Royal Hong Kong Jockey Club.

In 1995, Taylor earned the Sovereign Award of Merit, named for his late father, and in 1996 he was inducted in the Canadian Horse Racing Hall of Fame in the Builders category.

Taylor died from cancer on July 8, 1997, at age 62.

== Bibliography ==
- Reporter in Red China (1966) Random House, New York
- Snow Job: Canada, the United States and Vietnam (1954 to 1973) (1974) House of Anansi Press, Toronto
- Six Journeys (1977) House of Anansi Press, Toronto
- Radical Tories: The Conservative Tradition in Canada (1982) House of Anansi Press, Toronto
- China Hands: The Globe and Mail in Peking (Editor) (1984) McClelland & Stewart, Toronto
