= Canebora =

Canadian-bred Thoroughbred racehorse

- Sire: Canadian Champ
- Grandsire: Windfields
- Dam: Menebora
- Damsire: Menetrier
- Sex: Stallion
- Foaled: 1960
- Country: Canada
- Colour: Brown
- Breeder: E. P. Taylor
- Owner: Windfields Farm
- Trainer: Gordon J. McCann
- Record: 31: 10-5-6
- Earnings: $141,414

Major wins
- Carleton Stakes (1962); Plate Trial Stakes (1963); Queen's Plate (1963); Prince of Wales Stakes (1963); Breeders' Stakes (1963); Ultimus Handicap (1964)

Awards
- 7th Canadian Triple Crown Champion (1963); Canadian Horse of the Year (1963)
- Last updated on December 2, 2006

Canebora (1960–1972) is a Thoroughbred racehorse who won the Canadian Triple Crown in 1963 and was voted the Sovereign Award for Horse of the Year.
