= Cool Reception =

Canadian-bred Thoroughbred racehorse

- Sire: Nearctic
- Grandsire: Nearco
- Dam: Windy Answer
- Damsire: Windfields
- Sex: Stallion
- Foaled: 1964
- Country: Canada
- Colour: Chestnut
- Breeder: E. P. Taylor
- Owner: Larkin Maloney
- Trainer: Carl F. Chapman; Lou Cavalaris, Jr.
- Record: 18: 10-4-1
- Earnings: $153,477

Major wins
- Summer Stakes (1966); Cup and Saucer Stakes (1966); Coronation Futurity Stakes (1966); Fort Lauderdale Handicap (1967); Marine Stakes (1967)

Awards
- Canadian Champion 2-Year-Old Colt (1966)

Honours
- Canadian Horse Racing Hall of Fame (2005)

Cool Reception (1964–1967) is a Canadian Hall of Fame Thoroughbred racehorse. During his two-year-old racing season, trainer Carl Chapman retired and the colt's conditioning was taken over by Lou Cavalaris, Jr.

== Racing career ==
In 1966, Cool Reception dominated his age group in Canada, winning seven consecutive races, including the two richest races for 2-year-olds in the country under jockey Avelino Gomez. His performances earned him the 1966 Sovereign Award for Champion 2-Year-Old Male Horse.

At age three, Cool Reception was shipped south to race in the United States, where he met with limited success, winning the Fort Lauderdale Handicap against older rivals and an allowance race in Canada. After he finished second in the Derby Trial, his trainer decided to bypass the Kentucky Derby. Cool Reception returned to Canada, where he easily won the Marine Stakes. His eight-length victory prompted his handlers to try him in the Belmont Stakes, where he faced Kentucky Derby winner Proud Clarion and the winner of the Preakness Stakes and future U.S. Horse of the Year and Hall of Famer Damascus.

Shipped to Belmont Park, Cool Reception finished second to Damascus in the 1967 Belmont Stakes. Ridden by jockey Johnny Sellers, he raced the last two hundred yards on a broken right foreleg. An operation could not save the colt, and he was euthanized.

== Honors ==
In 2005, Cool Reception's accomplishments were recognized with his induction in the Canadian Horse Racing Hall of Fame.
