= Windfields =

Canadian-bred Thoroughbred racehorse

- Sire: Bunty Lawless
- Grandsire: Ladder
- Dam: Nandi
- Damsire: Stimulus
- Sex: Stallion
- Foaled: 1943
- Country: Canada
- Colour: Bay
- Breeder: E. P. Taylor
- Owner: E. P. Taylor
- Trainer: Bert Alexandra
- Record: 75: 19-10-5
- Earnings: $83,380

Major wins
- Victoria Stakes (1945); Gravesend Purse (1946); Breeders' Stakes (1946)

Honours
- Canadian Horse Racing Hall of Fame (2002)

Windfields (1943–1971) was a Canadian Hall of Fame Thoroughbred racehorse who was the first stakes race winner bred by E. P. Taylor and for whom he named his world-famous Windfields Farm in Oshawa, Ontario.

Out of the mare Nandi, for whom the Nandi Stakes at Woodbine Racetrack is named, Windfields was sired by Bunty Lawless, who in 1951 was voted Canada's "Horse of the Half-Century."

Trained by Bert Alexandra, as a two-year-old in 1945, Windfields won his first start by six lengths, then won the five furlong Victoria Stakes in a time of 0:59.00, breaking Faireno's track record at Old Woodbine Racetrack by 3/5 of a second. The colt followed this win with another track record in the Rosedale Purse but then suffered a knee injury that kept him out of racing.

Ineligible for Canada's most prestigious race, the Kings Plate for three-year-olds, in September 1946 the three-year-old Windfields defeated Plate winner Kingarvie by five lengths in the 1946 Breeders' Stakes. Scratched from the 1946 Belmont Stakes, Windfields won his third straight race, and second in a row at Aqueduct Racetrack, with a win in the mile and one-eighth Gravesend Purse.

Although never a great racehorse, Windfields competed through age six, notably defeating the great Australian runner Shannon to win a Stakes race on January 25, 1948, at Santa Anita Park in Arcadia, California.

== As a sire ==
Retired to stud duty, Windfields made his real contribution to racing as a stallion. He sired fifteen stakes winners, including 1956 Canadian Triple Crown winner and Hall of Fame inductee Canadian Champ. Through his daughter Victoriana, who produced seven winners, Windfields was the damsire of the good filly Northern Queen, and Canadian Horse of the Year and Hall of Fame inductee Victoria Park. Through another daughter, Windfields was the damsire of Cool Reception, the 1996 Canadian Champion 2-Year-Old Colt and a Hall of Fame inductee.

Windfields died in 1971 at age twenty-eight and was buried in the equine cemetery at Windfields Farm in Oshawa, Ontario.

== Sire line tree ==
- Windfields
  - Canadian Champ
    - Canebora
    - Titled Hero

== Pedigree ==
Pedigree of Windfields, bay stallion, 1943
Sire Bunty Lawless	Ladder	Ladkin	Fair Play
Sire Bunty Lawless	Ladder	Ladkin	Lading
Sire Bunty Lawless	Ladder	Panoply	Peter Pan
Sire Bunty Lawless	Ladder	Panoply	Inaugural
Sire Bunty Lawless	Mintwina	Mint Briar	Assagai
Sire Bunty Lawless	Mintwina	Mint Briar	Sweet Briar
Sire Bunty Lawless	Mintwina	Edwina	Celt
Sire Bunty Lawless	Mintwina	Edwina	Lady Godiva
Dam Nandi	Stimulus	Ultimus	Commando
Dam Nandi	Stimulus	Ultimus	Running Stream
Dam Nandi	Stimulus	Hurakan	Uncle
Dam Nandi	Stimulus	Hurakan	The Hoyden
Dam Nandi	Golden Feast	Golden Sun	Sundridge
Dam Nandi	Golden Feast	Golden Sun	Golden Lassie
Dam Nandi	Golden Feast	Mi-Careme	Desmond
Dam Nandi	Golden Feast	Mi-Careme	Carim (family: 11-c)
