= Magic of Life =

American-bred Thoroughbred racehorse

- Sire: Seattle Slew
- Grandsire: Bold Reasoning
- Dam: Larida
- Damsire: Northern Dancer
- Sex: Mare
- Foaled: 27 January 1985
- Country: United States
- Colour: Bay
- Breeder: Newstead Farm
- Owner: Stavros Niarchos
- Trainer: Jeremy Tree
- Record: 9: 4-1-1
- Earnings: £145,376

Major wins
- Mill Reef Stakes (1987); Coronation Stakes (1988)

Magic of Life (27 January 1985 – after 2009) was an American-bred British-trained Thoroughbred racehorse and broodmare. She was bred in Virginia, was sold for a world record price for a foal and sent to race in Europe. As a juvenile she showed very good form, winning three of her five races including a victory over male opposition in the Mill Reef Stakes. In the following year she recorded her most important success when winning the Coronation Stakes at Royal Ascot. She went on to have a long and successful second career as a broodmare.

== Background ==
Magic of Life was a "strong, lengthy" bay mare with a white blaze and white socks on her hind legs bred in Virginia by Newstead Farm. She was sired by Seattle Slew who won the American Triple Crown in 1977 before becoming an influential breeding stallion. His other offspring included Swale, Landaluce, Slew o' Gold and A.P. Indy. Magic of Life's dam Larida was a high-class racemare who won ten races including the Orchid Handicap.

At the dispersal of the Newstead breeding stock in November 1985, Magic of Life was offered for auction and was sold for $2.5 million, a world record price for a foal which stood for twelve years. She entered the ownership of the Greek shipping magnate Stavros Niarchos and was sent to Europe where she was trained by Jeremy Tree at Beckhampton in Wiltshire. She was ridden in most of her races by the Irish jockey Pat Eddery.

== Racing career ==
=== 1987: two-year-old season ===
On her racecourse debut, Magic of Life contested the West Ilsley Maiden Stakes over five furlongs at Newbury Racecourse and won by one and a half lengths from Jodoka. She was then moved up in class and distance for the Group Three Cherry Hinton Stakes over six furlongs at Newmarket Racecourse in July. She started the 100/30 second favourite and finished one and a half lengths into second by the Henry Cecil-trained Diminuendo, after appearing to be outpaced by the winner in the closing stages. She was well-fancied for the Princess Margaret Stakes at Ascot later in the month, but after disputing the lead for most of the way she faded in the final furlong and finished third of the five runners behind Bluebook. In August she was dropped in class and won a minor race over six furlongs at Windsor Racecourse. On her final appearance of the season, Magic of Life was matched against colts for the first time in the Group Two Mill Reef Stakes at Newbury. She was made the 4/1 second favourite behind Rahy who had won his two previous starts including the Sirenia Stakes, with the best of the other three runners appearing to be the Gimcrack Stakes runner-up Intimidate. Eddery restrained the filly at the rear of the field before moving into second place behind Intimidate two furlongs out. She moved alongside the leader in the final furlong before drawing ahead to win by three quarters of a length, with a gap of five lengths back to Rahy in third place.

=== 1988: three-year-old season ===
On her first appearance as a three-year-old, Magic of Life ran in the 175th running of the 1000 Guineas over the Rowley Mile course at Newmarket on 28 April. The French-trained filly Ravinella started odds-on favourite ahead of Diminuendo and the Nell Gwyn Stakes winner Ghariba with Magic of Life next in the betting at odds of 12/1. She never looked likely to win and finished seventh of the twelve runners, twelve lengths behind Ravinella. After the race she was found to be suffering from a respiratory infection: in Tree's words she had "muck in her lungs".

The 139th running of the Coronation Stakes at Royal Ascot on 15 June was the first time that the race had been run as a Group One race. Ravinella, who had added to her Newmarket success by winning the Poule d'Essai des Pouliches started 4/6 favourite whilst Magic of Life was a 16/1 outsider in the eight-runner field. The other contenders included Ohsomellow, an unbeaten filly from the Luca Cumani stable, Ashayer (winner of the Prix Marcel Boussac), Action Française (Prix de Sandringham) and Harmless Albatross (Prix des Chênes). Magic of Life was restrained by Eddery towards the rear of the field in the early stages and was sixth behind Ohsomellow on the final turn. She made rapid progress when switched to the outside in the straight, took the lead approaching the final furlong, and won by two lengths from the 33/1 outsider Inchmurrin (ridden by Eddery's brother Paul), with a gap of four lengths back to Ravinella in third place. Ravinella's jockey Gary Moore admitted "we were beaten on the day by a better filly".

After a break of more than two months, Magic of Life returned for the Waterford Crystal Mile in which she was matched against colts and older horses and started second favourite alongside Doyoun behind the 1986 winner Then Again. She finished fourth of the six runners behind Prince Rupert, Then Again and Doyoun, beaten three lengths by the winner. On her final appearance, Magic of Life started at odds of 14/1 for the Queen Elizabeth II Stakes at Ascot on 24 September. She never looked likely to win and finished seventh of the eight runners behind Warning.

== Assessment ==
In 1987 the independent Timeform organisation awarded Magic of Life a rating of 113, eight pounds below their best-two-year old filly Ravinella. In the official International Classification she was rated ten pounds inferior to the French filly.

== Breeding record ==
After her retirement from racing Magic of Life became a broodmare for her Stavros Niarchos's stud, and on his death in 1996 she was transferred to the Niarchos family's Flaxman Holdings breeding organisation. At the Keeneland Sales in November 1998 she was offered for sale and bought for $610,000 by David Nagle's Barronstown Stud. He later foals were officially bred by Padelco, a breeding company connected to the Coolmore Stud. She produced at least thirteen foals and seven winners between 1990 and 2009:

- Circle of Chalk, a chestnut filly, foaled in 1990, sired by Kris. Failed to win in two races.
- From Beyond, chestnut filly, 1991, by Kris. Won one race: the Listed Prix Vulcain at Évry. Dam of Chunyi, runner-up in the Yushun Himba
- Mountains of Mist, bay filly, 1992, by Shirley Heights. Won one race. Dam of Madeira Mist (Dance Smartly Stakes) who was in turn the dam of Joshua Tree.
- Reveuse de Jour, bay filly, 1993, by Sadler's Wells. Failed to win in three races. Dam of Nova Hawk (Premio Sergio Cumani, runner-up in the Coronation Stakes)
- Messina, bay filly, 1994, by Sadler's Wells. Failed to win in two races.
- Burano, colt (later gelded), 1996, by Seeking The Gold. Failed to win in four races.
- Water Echo, bay filly, 1997, by Mr. Prospector. Won one race.
- Enthused, bay filly, 1998, by Seeking The Gold. Won three races including the Princess Margaret Stakes and the Lowther Stakes. Dam of Norman Invader (Round Tower Stakes).
- Lucius Verrus, bay colt (later gelded), 2000, by Danzig. Won six races.
- Skagway, bay or brown colt, 2002, by Seeking The Gold. Won three races.
- Asuncion, bay filly, 2007, by Powerscourt. Unraced.
- Orchestra Leader, bay colt (later gelded), 2009, by Van Nistelrooy. Won one race.

== Pedigree ==
Pedigree of Magic of Life (USA), bay mare 1985
Sire Seattle Slew (USA) 1974	Bold Reasoning (USA); 1968	Boldnesian	Bold Ruler
Sire Seattle Slew (USA) 1974	Bold Reasoning (USA); 1968	Boldnesian	Alanesian
Sire Seattle Slew (USA) 1974	Bold Reasoning (USA); 1968	Reason to Earn	Hail To Reason
Sire Seattle Slew (USA) 1974	Bold Reasoning (USA); 1968	Reason to Earn	Sailing Home
Sire Seattle Slew (USA) 1974	My Charmer (USA); 1969	Poker	Round Table
Sire Seattle Slew (USA) 1974	My Charmer (USA); 1969	Poker	Glamour
Sire Seattle Slew (USA) 1974	My Charmer (USA); 1969	Fair Charmer	Jet Action
Sire Seattle Slew (USA) 1974	My Charmer (USA); 1969	Fair Charmer	Myrtle Charm
Dam Larida (USA) 1979	Northern Dancer (CAN); 1961	Nearctic	Nearco
Dam Larida (USA) 1979	Northern Dancer (CAN); 1961	Nearctic	Lady Angela
Dam Larida (USA) 1979	Northern Dancer (CAN); 1961	Natalma	Native Dancer
Dam Larida (USA) 1979	Northern Dancer (CAN); 1961	Natalma	Almahmoud
Dam Larida (USA) 1979	Kittiwake (USA); 1968	Sea-Bird	Dan Cupid
Dam Larida (USA) 1979	Kittiwake (USA); 1968	Sea-Bird	Sicalade
Dam Larida (USA) 1979	Kittiwake (USA); 1968	Ole Liz	Double Jay
Dam Larida (USA) 1979	Kittiwake (USA); 1968	Ole Liz	Islay Mist (Family 4-m)
