= Shepperton (horse) =

Canadian-bred Thoroughbred racehorse

- Sire: Sun Craig
- Grandsire: Sun Briar
- Dam: Chat Water
- Damsire: Chatterton
- Sex: Stallion
- Foaled: 1939
- Country: Canada
- Colour: Bay
- Breeder: Fred H. Schelke
- Owner: Fred H. Schelke
- Trainer: Fred H. Schelke
- Record: 54: 22-11-5
- Earnings: Can$35,585

Major wins
- Autumn Stakes (1942); Canadian Championship Stakes (1942, 1943); Jubilee Handicap (1943); Bryan and O'Hara Memorial Handicap (1944) Canadian Classic Race wins: Breeders' Stakes (1942)

Honours
- Canadian Horse Racing Hall of Fame (1976); Shepperton Stakes at Woodbine Racetrack

Shepperton (foaled 1939 in Ontario) was a Canadian Thoroughbred Hall of Fame racehorse. He was a son of Sun Craig, who was sired by Sun Briar, the 1917 American Champion Two-Year-Old Colt who sired such outstanding runners as Firethorn, Pompey, and U.S. Racing Hall of Fame inductee Sun Beau. Shepperton's dam was Chat Water, a daughter of Claiborne Farm's 1932 Leading sire in North America, Chatterton.

Shepperton was bred, owned, and conditioned for racing by Hall of Fame inductee Fred H. Schelke. He is best remembered for his back-to-back wins in the Canadian Championship Stakes and became part of the inaugural class of inductees following the formation of the Canadian Horse Racing Hall of Fame. His profile there says that despite being a "confirmed cripple from birth," Shepperton was "the wonder horse" of his time.

He was not successful as a sire.
