= 1946 Belmont Stakes =

American horse race

78th Belmont Stakes
- Belmont Stakes
- Grade I stakes race
- Location: Belmont Park; Elmont, New York, U.S.
- Date: June 1, 1946
- Distance: 1 1/2 mi (12 furlongs; 2,414 m)
- Winning horse: Assault
- Winning time: 2:30 4/5
- Jockey: Warren Mehrtens
- Trainer: Max Hirsch
- Owner: King Ranch
- Conditions: Fast
- Surface: Dirt

The 1946 Belmont Stakes was the 78th running of the Belmont Stakes. It was the 40th Belmont Stakes held at Belmont Park in Elmont, New York and was held on June 1, 1946. With a field of three horses, Assault, the winner of that year's Kentucky Derby and Preakness Stakes won the 1 1/2–mile race (12 f; 2.4 km) by 3 lengths over Natchez.

With the win, Assault became the seventh Triple Crown champion.

== Results ==
Finish	PP	Horse	Jockey	Trainer	Owner	Final odds	Earnings US$
1	1	Assault	Warren Mehrtens	Max Hirsch	King Ranch	1.40	$75,400
2	6	Natchez	Conn McCreary	Oscar White	Walter M. Jeffords Sr.	8.60	$20,000
3	2	Cable	Ted Atkinson	George P. "Maj" Odom	Josephine Widener Wichfeld	45.50	$10,000
4	7	Hampden	Eddie Arcaro	Richard E. Handlen	Foxcatcher Farm	3.75	$5,000
5	5	Lord Boswell	Eric Guerin	James W. Smith	Maine Chance Farm	1.35	$20
6	4	Mahout	Johnny Longden	Oscar White	Walter M. Jeffords Sr.	8.60	$20
7	3	War Watch	Al Scotti	Hugh Dufford	Mrs. Alfred Roberts	92.80	$20

- Scratched: Cedar Creek, Manor Lad, Windfields
- Winning breeder: King Ranch; (TX)

== Payout ==
Horse	Straight	Place	Show
Assault	$4.80	$3.10	$2.70
Natchez	–	$5.70	$4.10
Cable	–	–	$6.50

- Based on a $2 wager.
