= Alvin (horse) =

Canadian Standardbred racehorse

Alvin is a champion trotting horse. He was foaled 1885, and died in 1927 at the age of 42.

Bred in Ontario, Canada, Alvin took his lifetime record of 2:11 in 1893 at Buffalo, New York, becoming the fastest ever Canadian-bred trotter. At the end of his career, he was exported to Russia to become a sire.

Alvin was inducted into the Canadian Horse Racing Hall of Fame in 2000.

== See also ==
- Harness racing
