= Dotties Pick =

Canadian Standardbred racehorse

- Breed: Standardbred
- Sire: Adios
- Dam: Pick Up
- Sex: Mare
- Foaled: 1952
- Died: 1980
- Country: Canada
- Owner: J. Elgin & Charles E. Armstrong
- Trainer: Delvin Miller
- Record: 42-27-13
- Earnings: $263,978

Major wins
- American Pacing Classic (1956)

Honours
- Canadian Horse Racing Hall of Fame (1976)

Dotties Pick (1952–1980) was a champion Standardbred pacing horse. She was by Adios and out of Pick Up.

Dotties Pick was bred in Ontario, Canada. She compiled a then-record of 42 wins, 27 seconds and 13 thirds and earnings of $263,978 in a four-year campaign. She was the first pacing mare to top $100,000 in a single season.

Dotties Pick was inducted into the Canadian Horse Racing Hall of Fame in 1976, thirteen years before her brother Adios Pick.

== See also ==
- Harness racing
