= Adios Pick =

Standardbred racehorse

Adios Pick (born in 1954) is a champion Standardbred trotting horse. He was a foal of Adios and Pick Up.

Adios Pick was bred in Ontario, Canada. After an injury prematurely ended his racing career, he became a profiled sire. His offspring amassed earnings of $18.8 million in stakes racing.

Adios Pick was inducted into the Canadian Horse Racing Hall of Fame in 1989, thirteen years after his full sister Dotties Pick.

== See also ==
- Harness racing
