= Mildred Williams =

Canadian harness racer (1916–2008)

Mildred Williams (25 July 1916 — 21 May 2008) was a Canadian harness racer between the 1950s and 1970s. Williams started racing in Canada in 1951 and applied for a United States Trotting Association license throughout the 1960s. After being initially rejected by the USTA because of their policy to not give licenses to women jockeys, the organization gave Williams her license in 1968. After ending her racing career in 1973, Williams had competed in over 2000 races and had 327 wins. In 2012, she was posthumously inducted into the Canadian Horse Racing Hall of Fame.

== Early life ==
On 25 July 1916, Williams was born in Ameliasburg, Ontario.

== Career ==
Williams began her equestrian career taking care of standardbred horses before entering in a 1951 race at Thorncliffe Park Raceway. Throughout the 1960s, Williams applied to the United States Trotting Association for a license to compete in American parimutuel betting races. William's attempts in 1960 and 1964 were rejected by the USTA because of the organization's policy to not grant women riders parimutuel racing licenses. When Williams said she would not compete at an international horse racing competition without a license from the organization, the USTA gave Williams her license in 1968.

In 1970, Williams began competing in the United States. After a car accident ended her competitive career in 1973, Williams worked in horse care until her retirement in 1983. After retiring, Williams had raced in over 2000 races with 327 wins.

== Awards and honours ==
In 2006, the Mildred Williams International Driving Series was opened as a women's only charity series raced throughout North America. For hall of fames, Williams was posthumously inducted into the Canadian Horse Racing Hall of Fame in 2012.

== Death ==
Williams died on 21 May 2008 in Ottawa, Ontario.
