= Moe "Murray" Brown =

Canadian businessman

Moe "Murray" Brown (born August 3, 1941) is vice president and general manager of Standardbred Sales Company and Public Relations Director of Hanover Shoe Farms.

== Early life and education ==
Moe "Murray" Brown was born in Côte-Saint-Luc, Quebec and grew up in Montreal. Despite losing his parents at an early age and growing up in poverty, Brown—who admits to having skipped school to go watch horse races—began his climb to success at the age of 22, when he joined Miron Farm in Quebec, which at the time was one of the leading race and breeding farms. His formal education was ignored in favor of the passionate study of breeding and making himself a pest to the professionals at local race tracks.

== Hanover Shoe Farms and Standardbred Sales Company ==
Brown joined Hanover Shoe Farms in 1967 holding various positions until becoming its Public Relations Director . Brown became vice president and general manager of Standardbred Horse Racing Company in 1972. In meeting the obligations of those two positions, Brown often travels 30,000 miles a year attending all significant gatherings of the Standardbred horse racing community and various one-on-ones with owners and potential bidders.

Brown only made his first investment in horses in 2004, when he purchased a small percentage of one of the greatest standardbred's of modern times: Donato Hanover.

== Hall of Fame ==
Brown was inducted into the Canadian Horse Racing Hall of Fame in 2003 (as "Murray Brown") in consideration of his position as one of the most knowledgeable, indefatigable, scholars of standardbred pedigrees Pedigree (animal) and history of maternal families.

== Personal life ==
Brown, who lost his father when he was 2 years old and his mother at the age of 15, subsequently was raised by his oldest brother, Sam. On May 2, 1965, he married Marlene Brown (née Scheer), and the couple subsequently had three children and five grandchildren. After close to 40 years of marriage, Brown lost his wife to cancer in February 2005. He currently resides in Hanover, Pennsylvania.

== See also ==
- Hanover Shoe Farms
- Standardbred racehorsess
- Canadian Horse Racing Hall of Fame
