= Joshua Tree (horse) =

Irish-bred Thoroughbred racehorse

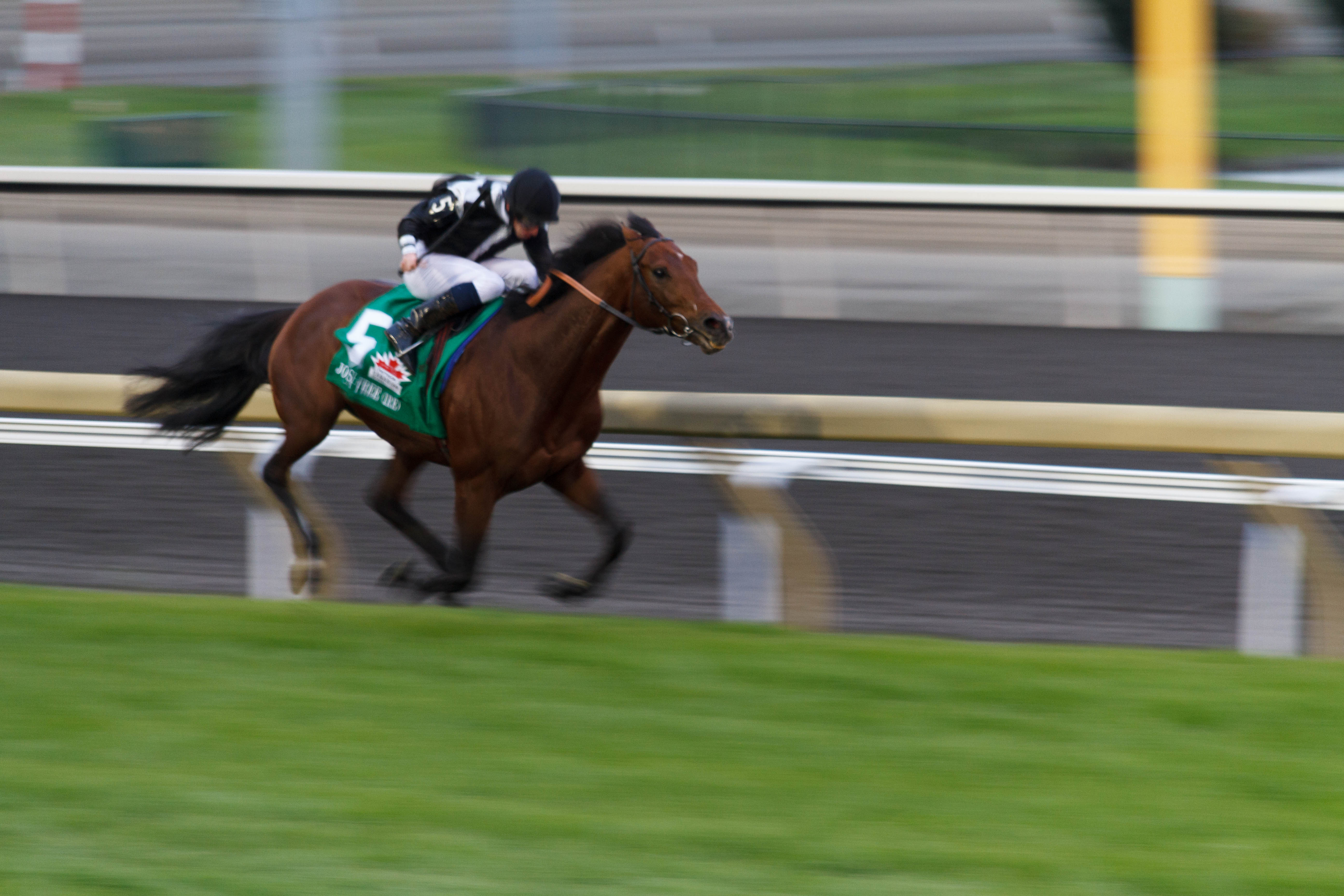
- Joshua Tree winning the 2013 Canadian International
- Sire: Montjeu
- Grandsire: Sadler's Wells
- Dam: Madeira Mist
- Damsire: Grand Lodge
- Sex: Stallion
- Foaled: 8 March 2007
- Country: Ireland
- Colour: Bay
- Breeder: Castlemartin Stud And Skymarc Farm
- Owner: K K Al Nabooda & K Albahou
- Trainer: Aidan O'Brien; Ibrahim Saeed Al Malki; Marco Botti; Ed Dunlop
- Record: 32: 7-7-4
- Earnings: £2,392,298

Major wins
- Royal Lodge Stakes (2009); Canadian International Stakes (2010, 2012, 2013); Ormonde Stakes (2011); Qatar International Invitation Cup (2011); Prix Kergorlay (2011)

Awards
- First ever three time Canadian International Winner
- Last updated on 20/10/14

Joshua Tree (Foaled March 8, 2007) is an Irish thoroughbred stallion, bred by Castlemartin Stud And Skymarc Farm. He is sired by Montjeu. He is a four time Group 1 winner, having earned £2.4m ($3.8m) in his racing career. Joshua Tree is the only horse to have ever won the Gr.1 Pattison Canadian International Stakes three times: in 2010, 2012 and 2013. Joshua also won the Gr. 2 Royal Lodge in Ascot at the age of two, the Gr. 2 Prix Kergorlay in Deauville, the Gr. 1 International Invitational cup in Qatar, and the Irish Stallion Farms maiden stakes in Ireland. He came second in the Gr. 1 Canadian International in 2011, Second in the Gr. 2 Princess of Wales's stakes in Newmarket, second in the Gr. 2 Prix Kergorlay in Deauville and second in the gr. 3 Dubai Gold Cup. Joshua Tree is owned by K Nabooda and K Albahou. He stands at Stud in France.

== Racing career ==
Joshua Tree ranks fourth on the list of earners sired by Montjeu, behind St Nicholas Abbey, Green Moon and Hurricane Run.

== Gr.1 Canadian International ==
=== First Win ===
Jockey: Colm O'Donoghue Trainer: Aidan O'Brien.

=== Second Win ===
Jockey: Frankie Dettori Trainer: Marco Botti. Grade I

=== Third Win ===
Jockey: Ryan Moore Trainer Ed Dunlop. The winning time was 2m35.45s.

== Pedigree ==
Pedigree of Joshua Tree (IRE), bay stallion, 2007
Sire Montjeu (IRE) 1996	Sadler's Wells; 1981	Northern Dancer	Nearctic
Sire Montjeu (IRE) 1996	Sadler's Wells; 1981	Northern Dancer	Natalma
Sire Montjeu (IRE) 1996	Sadler's Wells; 1981	Fairy Bridge	Bold Reason
Sire Montjeu (IRE) 1996	Sadler's Wells; 1981	Fairy Bridge	Special
Sire Montjeu (IRE) 1996	Floripedes; 1985	Top Ville	High Top
Sire Montjeu (IRE) 1996	Floripedes; 1985	Top Ville	Segaville
Sire Montjeu (IRE) 1996	Floripedes; 1985	Toute Cy	Tennyson
Sire Montjeu (IRE) 1996	Floripedes; 1985	Toute Cy	Adele Tournignon
Dam Madeira Mist (IRE) 1999	Grand Lodge; 1991	Chief's Crown	Danzig
Dam Madeira Mist (IRE) 1999	Grand Lodge; 1991	Chief's Crown	Six Crowns
Dam Madeira Mist (IRE) 1999	Grand Lodge; 1991	La Papagena	Habitat
Dam Madeira Mist (IRE) 1999	Grand Lodge; 1991	La Papagena	Magic Flute
Dam Madeira Mist (IRE) 1999	Mountains of Mist; 1992	Shirley Heights	Mill Reef
Dam Madeira Mist (IRE) 1999	Mountains of Mist; 1992	Shirley Heights	Hardiemma
Dam Madeira Mist (IRE) 1999	Mountains of Mist; 1992	Magic of Life	Seattle Slew
Dam Madeira Mist (IRE) 1999	Mountains of Mist; 1992	Magic of Life	Larida
