= Queensway (horse) =

Canadian-bred Thoroughbred racehorse

- Sire: Old Koenig
- Grandsire: Golden Maxim
- Dam: Chrysoberil
- Damsire: Verdun
- Sex: Mare
- Foaled: 1929
- Country: Canada
- Colour: Chestnut
- Breeder: Robert W. R. Cowie
- Owner: Robert W. R. Cowie
- Trainer: Harry Giddings, Jr.
- Record: 52: 12-8-4
- Earnings: $16,811

Major wins
- King's Plate (1932); Prince of Wales Stakes (1932); Breeders' Stakes (1932)

Awards
- 1st Canadian Triple Crown Champion (1932)

Honours
- Canadian Horse Racing Hall of Fame (2003)

Queensway (foaled 1929 in Ontario) was a Canadian Thoroughbred racehorse who in 1932 won the three races that would years later officially be designated as the Canadian Triple Crown.

The chestnut filly was owned and bred by Robert W. R. Cowie and trained by Harry Giddings, Jr. Her jockey at the time of her three 1932 major wins was Frankie Mann.

Queensway had 52 starts, which included 12 wins, 8 places and 4 shows. Her career earnings were $16,811.

In 2003, she was inducted into the Canadian Horse Racing Hall of Fame.

== Pedigree ==
Pedigree of Queensway, mare, ch. 1929 (CAN)
Sire Old Koenig b. 1913 (US)	Golden Maxim b. 1900 (US)	Golden Garter ch. 1888 (GB)	Bend Or ch. 1877 (GB)
Sire Old Koenig b. 1913 (US)	Golden Maxim b. 1900 (US)	Golden Garter ch. 1888 (GB)	Sanda ch. 1878 (GB)
Sire Old Koenig b. 1913 (US)	Golden Maxim b. 1900 (US)	Miss Maxim b. 1893 (US)	Maxim br. 1884 (NZ)
Sire Old Koenig b. 1913 (US)	Golden Maxim b. 1900 (US)	Miss Maxim b. 1893 (US)	Ventura br. 1884 (US)
Sire Old Koenig b. 1913 (US)	Masthead ch. 1900 (US)	Hastings br. 1893 (US)	Spendthrift ch. 1876 (US)
Sire Old Koenig b. 1913 (US)	Masthead ch. 1900 (US)	Hastings br. 1893 (US)	Cinderella b. 1885 (GB)
Sire Old Koenig b. 1913 (US)	Masthead ch. 1900 (US)	Lady Margaret ch. 1886 (US)	The Ill-Used b. 1870 (GB)
Sire Old Koenig b. 1913 (US)	Masthead ch. 1900 (US)	Lady Margaret ch. 1886 (US)	Lady Rosebery ch. 1878 (US)
Dam Chrysoberil ch. 1917 (FR)	Verdun ch. 1906 (FR)	Rabelais b. 1900 (GB)	St Simon br. 1881 (GB)
Dam Chrysoberil ch. 1917 (FR)	Verdun ch. 1906 (FR)	Rabelais b. 1900 (GB)	Satirical ch. 1891 (GB)
Dam Chrysoberil ch. 1917 (FR)	Verdun ch. 1906 (FR)	Vellena b. 1894 (FR)	Gournay ch. 1884 (FR)
Dam Chrysoberil ch. 1917 (FR)	Verdun ch. 1906 (FR)	Vellena b. 1894 (FR)	Villefranche ch. 1889 (FR)
Dam Chrysoberil ch. 1917 (FR)	New Moon b. 1912 (US)	Flying Fox b. 1896 (GB)	Orme b. 1889 (GB)
Dam Chrysoberil ch. 1917 (FR)	New Moon b. 1912 (US)	Flying Fox b. 1896 (GB)	Vampire br. 1889 (GB)
Dam Chrysoberil ch. 1917 (FR)	New Moon b. 1912 (US)	New Mown Hay b. 1906 (US)	Flacon ch. 1894 (FR)
Dam Chrysoberil ch. 1917 (FR)	New Moon b. 1912 (US)	New Mown Hay b. 1906 (US)	Fourragere ch. 1899 (FR) (Family 14-a)

== See also ==
- List of racehorses
