= Ottawa Board of Education =

Address
- 330 Gilmour street Ottawa, Ontario; Canada

District information
- Grades: 1-13
- Established: 1970
- Closed: 1998

Students and staff
- District mascot: OBEE The Owl
- Colours: Blue and Red

Other information
- Former names: Ottawa Collegiate Board, Ottawa Public Board of Education, Rockcliffe Park School Board and the Vanier School Board

The Ottawa Board of Education (OBE) was the public school board for Ottawa from 1970 to 1998. The board was created as part of a province-wide reorganization of the public education system. Previously, elementary schools had been supervised by the Ottawa Public Board of Education, while secondary schools had been managed by the Ottawa Collegiate Board. As a result of The Fewer School Boards Act, both boards were merged with the Rockcliffe Park and Vanier boards, to form the OBE.

From 1976 to 1986 the school board lost over 10,000 students. A report on its English-language high schools issued in 1985 recommended four closures. By 1986 the school board only closed two of them. The OBE opposed transfers of its campuses to the Ottawa Separate School Board. In 1985 two trustees stated public opposition to the closures, arguing that the board should focus on improved education.

On January 1, 1998, the OBE and the Carleton Board of Education combined to form the Ottawa-Carleton District School Board. The new Board is responsible for providing English public education to all students in the entire Ottawa-Carleton region. As part of the effort to support the merger, the Ministry of Education and Training (MOET) introduced a new education funding model for all school boards in Ontario. Under the new funding model, surplus space identified per MOET formula in educational facilities within the board's jurisdiction will not be funded by the Provincial government, nor will funding be available for new school construction until surplus space is eliminated.

== See also ==
- Ottawa-Carleton District School Board
- Ottawa-Carleton Educational Space Simulation
