= Ottawa Collegiate Board =

Former School Board In Ottawa, Canada

Collegiate Institute Board of Ottawa

Location
- Ottawa, Ontario; Canada

District information
- Type: Public Secondary
- Grades: 9-13
- Established: 1874
- Closed: 1970

The Ottawa Collegiate Board (C.I.B.O) is a former Public Secondary School Board in Ottawa, Ontario up until its amalgamation in 1970. Its main role was to provide secondary education in English to the city. It served the city successfully for 96 years until its amalgamation where it would be merged with other boards.

== History ==
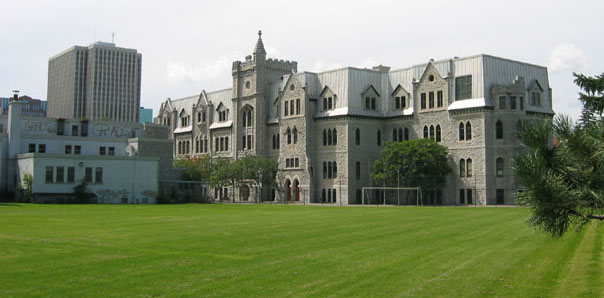
Photo of Lisgar Collegiate Institute

The Board was founded in 1874 with the opening of Ottawa Collegiate institute, it would remain the only high school in Ottawa until the opening of Ottawa Technical High School in 1913. The Ottawa Collegiate Institute would split in two with the split off from their second location (Glebe Collegiate Institute), Ottawa Collegiate Institute was changed to Lisgar Street Collegiate Institute (later shortened to Lisgar Collegiate Institute).

The Board's foundation would cement proper secondary education in Ottawa, as it merged with other smaller school boards creating a more uniform, regulated and trusted education system. The C.I.B.O would oversee the construction and erection of many schools throughout the city until its amalgamation with the Ottawa Public Board of Education, The Vanier Board and the Rockcliffe Board in 1970 creating the Ottawa Board of Education. The amalgamation would come as Ontario passed the Fewer School Boards Act.

=== Board of trustees ===
Between 1874 and 1903, only seven trustees served as Chairpersons of the board indicating a remarkable stability in leadership. The board's stability fostered continuity in the school's operations and policies, enabling trustees to implement long-term improvements. The board of trustees often gained insights into school discipline and the complexities of educational governance, acting in a judicial capacity during disciplinary matters. While the contributions of trustees varied, many were influential figures who provided support and guidance to the Principal and teaching staff. The role of a trustee came with significant responsibilities, particularly concerning the financial management of the school. Trustees were tasked with ensuring efficient use of public funds and selecting qualified teachers—a responsibility considered one of the most critical aspects of their role. While some trustees were less engaged due to other commitments, others demonstrated a profound dedication to the institution, often thinking beyond formal meetings to address the school's challenges.

The board upheld the authority of the Principal (education), ensuring support for effective teaching practices. No Principal could claim a lack of backing from the board if they presented their case properly. The board was known for its judicious management of public funds and its commitment to maintaining competitive teacher salaries, which were generally better than those offered by other Ontario school boards, with the exception of Toronto.

The Board of Trustees reflected the diverse demographics of Ottawa, including representatives from various cultural and religious backgrounds, such as English Protestants and French and Irish Roman Catholics. This diversity allowed the board to represent the interests of the community effectively. Trustees generally maintained public confidence and avoided major criticisms, benefiting from positive relationships with the community and educational inspectors.

== Education Expansion ==
The C.I.B.O built many schools throughout the years as the city expanded, here is a list of the first five of them.

- Lisgar Collegiate Institute (Opened in 1843)*
- Ottawa Technical High School (Opened in 1913),
- Glebe Collegiate Institute (Opened in 1922),
- High School of Commerce (Ottawa) (Opened in 1929),
- Fisher Park High School (Opened in 1949)

== See also ==
- Ottawa-Carleton District School Board
- Ottawa-Carleton Educational Space Simulation
- Ottawa Board of Education
- Education in Ontario
