= Jack Diamond (Canadian businessman) =

Canadian businessman

- Born: April 9, 1909; Lubience, Galicia
- Died: March 25, 2001 (aged 91)
- Occupation(s): businessman and philanthropist
- Awards: Order of Canada; Order of British Columbia

Jack Diamond, CC OBC (April 9, 1909 – March 25, 2001) was a Canadian businessman and philanthropist.

Born in Lubience in Galicia, Diamond immigrated to Vancouver in 1927. He bought a butcher shop and later created British Columbia's largest meat packing firm, Pacific Meats. In 1963, Diamond sold Pacific Meats and formed West Coast Reduction, a tallow and feed company.

He was Chancellor of Simon Fraser University from 1975 until 1978. In 1979, he was made a Member of the Order of Canada. He was promoted to Officer in 1980 and promoted to Companion in 2000. In 1991, Diamond was appointed to the Order of British Columbia.

At the age of 21, Diamond married Sadie Mandleman. They had two sons, Charles and Gordon, and have six grandchildren, and 15 great grandchildren.

Academic offices
Preceded by Kenneth P. Caple	Chancellor of Simon Fraser University; 1 June 1975–31 May 1978	Succeeded by Paul T. Cote
