= Canadian Horse Racing Hall of Fame =

Establishment in Toronto, Ontario, Canada

Coordinates: 43.71522°N 79.6040°W

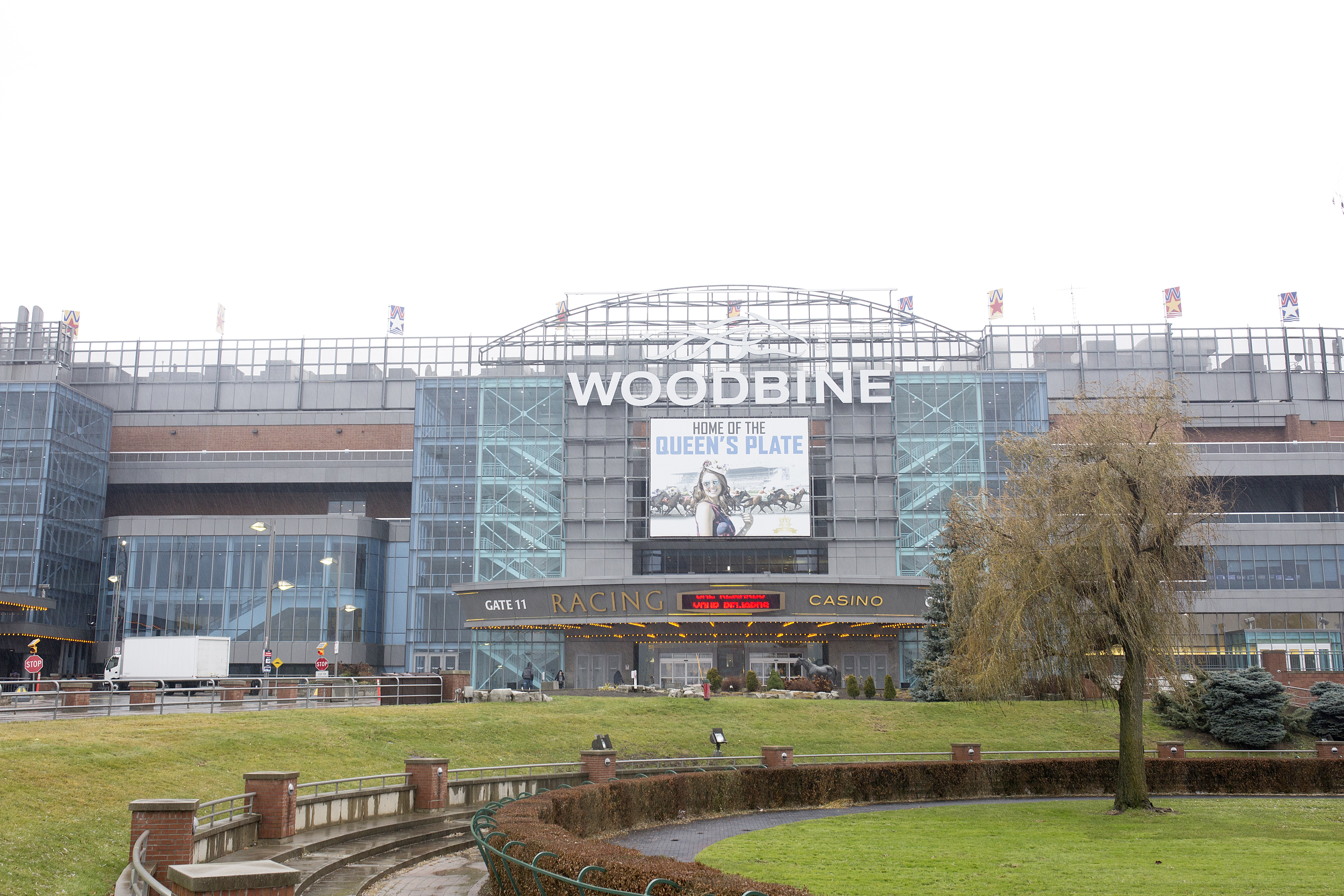
Woodbine Racetrack, home of the Canadian Horse Racing Hall of Fame

The Canadian Horse Racing Hall of Fame was established in 1976 to honour those who have made a significant contribution to the sport of harness and Thoroughbred horse racing in Canada. It is located at Woodbine Racetrack in Toronto, Ontario.

The Hall of Fame annually inducts Thoroughbred and Standardbred horses, sulky drivers, jockeys, trainers and the horse racing industry's builders.

== Background ==
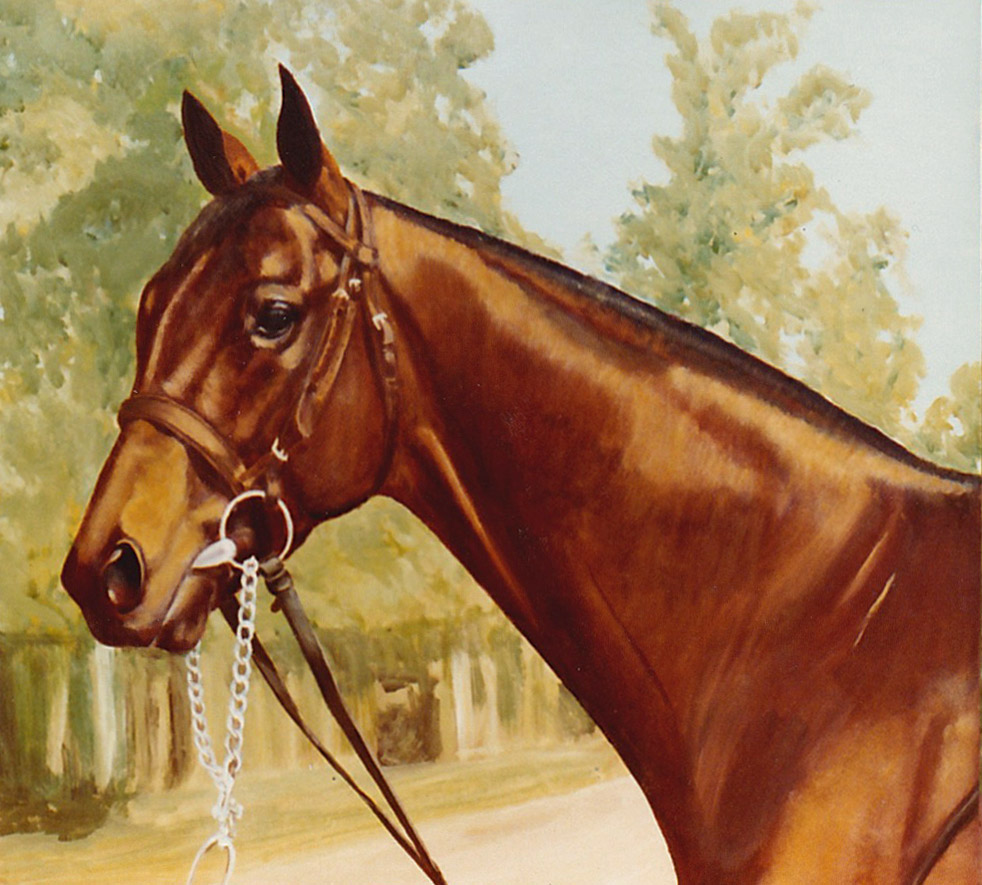
Norcliffe, painted by Bob Demuyser

Although the Canadian Horse Racing Hall of Fame (CHRHF) was founded in 1976, it was not until 1997 that it had a physical location. At that time, the Ontario Jockey Club granted a permanent site located at the West Entrance to Woodbine Racetrack. The Hall now includes information on each of the inductees plus related memorabilia, including trophies, silks, old racing programs and bronzed horseshoes. Each year, special displays are created to honour some of racing's greats, such as jockey Ron Turcotte or pacer Cam Fella.

In 2014, the Hall commemorated the 50th anniversary of Northern Dancer's wins in the Kentucky Derby, Preakness Stakes and Queen's Plate with a series of initiatives such as an online timeline of his career, the induction of his trainer Horatio Luro, a special tribute at the annual ceremony and a calendar. Northern Dancer and his owner, E. P. Taylor, were part of the original class of inductees in 1976. Since then, Northern Dancer's sire Nearctic, dam Natalma, sire's dam Lady Angela, several sons and daughters (including Nijinsky, The Minstrel, Northernette and Vice Regent), plus numerous descendants have also been inducted.

There are two nominating committees – one for the Thoroughbred industry, and the other for Standardbreds. Each committee nominates up to eight candidates, which are later voted on by the corresponding election committee. Any Canadian person or horse can be nominated for their achievements, whether in Canada or internationally. Foreign-bred horses who had a significant influence on Canadian racing or breeding may also be nominated. For example, Secretariat was nominated in 2013 in recognition of his appearance in the 1973 Canadian International, an appearance that brought worldwide attention to the race.

== Inductees (year inducted) ==
=== Thoroughbred horses ===
- Ace Marine (2003)
- Afleet (1992)
- All Along (2019) *
- Alydeed (2022)
- Alywow (2009)
- Anita's Son (2005)
- Archworth (2014)
- Arise (1983)
- Arravale (2012)
- Apelia (2014)
- Awesome Again (2001)
- Belle Geste (1990)
- Bold Ruckus (2006)
- Bull Page (1977)
- Bunty Lawless (1976)
- Canadiana (1978)
- Canadian Champ (2007)
- Carotene (2003)
- Casa Camara (2000)
- Channel Maker (2024)
- Chief Bearhart (2002)
- Chop Chop (1977)
- Ciboulette (1983)
- Classy 'n Smart (2004)
- Cool Mood (2014)
- Cool Reception (2005)
- Court Vision (2022)
- Dahlia (2016) *
- Dance Smartly (1995) *
- Dancethruthedawn (2011)
- Deputy Minister (1988)
- Duchess of York (1976)
- E. Day (1989)
- Exterminator (2016) *
- Flaming Page (1980)
- Fanfreluche (1981)
- Formal Gold (2023)
- Frost King (1986)
- Gallant Kitty (1977)
- George Royal (1976)
- Ghostzapper (2025) *
- Glorious Song (1995)
- Heart to Heart (2021)
- He's A Smoothie (2003)
- Hidden Treasure (2013)
- Horometer (1976)
- Inferno (1976)
- Izvestia (1999)
- Jambalaya (2012)
- Jammed Lovely (2007)
- Joey (1976)
- Judy the Beauty (2018)
- Kennedy Road (2000)
- Kingarvie (1976)
- Lady Angela (2010)
- Langcrest (1984)
- Langfuhr (2004)
- La Prevoyante (1976) *
- La Voyageuse (2009)
- Lauries Dancer (2006)
- Lexie Lou (2019)
- L'Alezane (2012)
- L'Enjoleur (2007)
- Major Presto (1982)
- Man o'War (2020)
- Marketing Mix (2025)
- Martimas (2001)
- Maryfield (2009)
- Mine That Bird (2015)
- Mona Bell (2000)
- Natalma (2007)
- Nearctic (1977)
- New Providence (1982)
- Nijinsky (1976)
- No Class (1997)
- Norcliffe (2005)
- Northern Dancer (1976) *
- Northernette (1987)
- Not Too Shy (2021)
- One for Rose (2026)
- Overskate (1993)
- Peteski (2009)
- Pink Lloyd (2023)
- Play the King (2020)
- Queensway (2003)
- Quiet Resolve (2017)
- Rahy's Attorney (2026)
- Runaway Groom (2001)
- Sealy Hill (2013)
- Secretariat (2013) *
- Shaman Ghost (2018)
- Shepperton (1976)
- Sir Barton (1976) *
- Sky Classic (1998)
- Smart Strike (2008)
- Soaring Free (2013)
- South Ocean (2017)
- South Shore (2000)
- Square Angel (2011)
- Sunny's Halo (1986)
- Starship Jubilee (2024)
- Storm Bird (2025)
- Tepin (2020) *
- Terror (1996)
- The Minstrel (1979)
- Touch Gold (2011)
- Vice Regent (1989)
- Victoria Park (1976)
- Victorian Era (2010)
- Victory Gallop (2010)
- Wando (2014)
- Wilderness Song (2008)
- Windfields (2002)
- Wise Dan (2016) *
- With Approval (1993)
- Wonder Where (2004)
- Yellow Rose (1996)
- Youville (1977)
- Note: An * designates they are also an inductee of the United States National Museum of Racing and Hall of Fame.

=== Standardbred horses ===
- A Worthy Lad (2010)
- Adios Pick (1989)
- Admirals Express (2013)
- Albatross (2014)
- Alvin (2000)
- Amour Angus (2020)
- Angus Hall (2019)
- Apaches Fame (2000)
- Armbro Emerson (2006)
- Armbro Feather (2006)
- Armbro Flight (1976)
- Armbro Nesbit (1977)
- Armbro Feather (2006)
- Armbro Omaha (2005)
- Artsplace (2015)
- As Promised (2006)
- Astreos (2012)
- BC Count (1984)
- Balanced Image (2000)
- Bardot Hanover (1986)
- Battle Axe (2002)
- Bay State Pat (1983)
- Bee A Magician (2024)
- Bettor's Delight (2007)
- Bill Sharon (2000)
- Billyjojimbob (1995)
- Blissfull Hall (2018)
- Bridger (1988)
- Bulldog Hanover (2023)
- Burning Point (2011)
- Cam Fella (1986)
- Camluck (2003)
- Captain Aubrey (2001)
- Cathedra (2007)
- Celias Counsel (2013)
- Champ Volo (2003)
- Chancey Lady (2018)
- Chilcoot (1976)
- Classic Wish (2010)
- Claybrook Van (1980)
- Countess Adios (2000)
- Dalyce Blue (2012)
- Dan Patch (2019) *
- Dillon Mc (2002)
- Dominion Grattan (1976)
- Dotties Pick (1976)
- Dr Stanton (1976)
- Dream of Glory (1993)
- Dreamfair Eternal (2014)
- Dudey Patch (1998)
- Elegantimage (2017)
- Ellamony (1998)
- Eternal Camnation (2013)
- Fan Hanover (1986)
- Fern Hal (2003)
- Flemington's Jane (1988)
- Frank Bogash Jr (1978)
- Fresh Yankee (1976)
- Garland Lobell (2005)
- Glorys Comet (2005)
- Goodtimes (2004)
- Grades Singing (1996)
- Grattan Bars (1976)
- Grattan Royal (1981)
- Great Memories (2021)
- Handle With Care (1979)
- Happy Three (2017)
- Harold H (2015)
- Helicopter (1984)
- Hy Class Minbar (1990)
- Invincible Shadow (1976)
- Invitro (2011)
- JCs Nathalie (2015)
- John R Braden (2001)
- Kadabra (2012)
- Lee Hanover (1982)
- Mach Three (2017)
- Make Believe (1987)
- Matt's Scooter (1992)
- McWicked (2020)
- Mighty Dudley (1985)
- Miss Admiral Todd (1983)
- Miss Vera Bars (1977)
- Mister Big (2010)
- Mystic Mistress (2012)
- Niatross (2013)
- No Sex Please (1993)
- Odies Fame (2016)
- On The Road Again (1999)
- Peaceful Way (2008)
- Precious Bunny (2004)
- Pure Ivory (2023)
- Ralph Hanover (1986)
- Rambling Willie (2020)
- Real Desire (2008)
- Rena Bison (2000)
- Rich N Elegant (2009)
- Rocknroll Hanover (2014)
- Run The Table (2006)
- San Pail (2016)
- Shadow Play (2022)
- Silent Majority (1976)
- Silver Reign (2011)
- Singing Herbert (1983)
- Skippy Day Brook (1987)
- Somebeachsomewhere (2009)
- Staying Together (2002)
- Strike Out (1976)
- Super Wave (2002)
- Symbol Allen (2000)
- Tacony (1985)
- The Count B (1981)
- The Eel (2011)
- The Exposer (2002)
- The Ghost (2003)
- Tie Silk (1976)
- Toll Gate (2000)
- Town Pro (2004)
- Tricky Tooshie (2019)
- Watchim (2000)
- Wesgate Frame (2011)
- Winnipeg (1976)
- Woodlawn Drummond (2016)

=== Thoroughbred jockeys ===
- Ted Atkinson (2002) *
- Larry Attard (2001)
- Russell Baze (2012) *
- Gary Boulanger (2020)
- Thomas H. Burns (2011) *
- Eurico Rosa da Silva (2022)
- John Dewhurst (2012)
- Hugo Dittfach (1983)
- Irwin Driedger (2023)
- Stewart Elliott (2015)
- Jeffrey Fell (1993)
- Jim Fitzsimmons (1984)
- Dude Foden (2000)
- David A. Gall (1993)
- Avelino Gomez (1977) *
- Richard Grubb (2024)
- Sandy Hawley (1986) *
- Patrick Husbands (2024)
- Robert Landry (2014)
- Chick Lang (1990)
- Herb Lindberg (1991)
- Charles S. Littlefield (2000)
- Johnny Longden (1976) *
- Chris Loseth (2007)
- Don MacBeth (1988)
- Frank Mann (2000)
- Dick O'Leary (2000)
- Robin Platts (1997)
- Red Pollard (1982)
- Pat Remillard (1979)
- Chris Rogers (1977)
- Willie Saunders (1976)
- Don Seymour (1999)
- Ron Turcotte (1980) *
- Mickey Walls (2019)
- Bobby Watson (1998)
- Hedley Woodhouse (1980)
- George Woolf (1976) *

=== Thoroughbred trainers ===
- Bert Alexandra (2002)
- Sid Attard (2013)
- Roger Attfield (1999) *
- Reade Baker (2018)
- Frank Barroby (2010)
- Harold Barroby (2017)
- Macdonald Benson (2002)
- James C. Bentley (1981)
- Charles Boyle (2001)
- William H. Bringloe (2000)
- Duke Campbell (1984)
- Josie Carroll (2019)
- Mark Casse (2016)
- Lou Cavalaris Jr. (1995)
- David C. Cross Jr. (2006)
- James E. Day (2006)
- John Dyment Jr. (2001)
- Philip England (2013)
- Morris Fishman (2001)
- Mark Frostad (2011)
- Harry Giddings Jr. (1985)
- Robert K. Hodgson (2001)
- Gordon M. Huntley (1998)
- Roy Johnson (2003)
- Mike Keogh (2020)
- Barry Littlefield (2000)
- Roger Laurin (2015)
- Lucien Laurin (1978) *
- Horatio Luro (2014) *
- Patrick MacMurchy (2012)
- Ted Mann (1982)
- Gordon J. McCann (1979)
- Frank H. Merrill Jr. (1981)
- Jerry C. Meyer (1999)
- John Nixon (2002)
- John Passero (2000)
- Gil Rowntree (1997)
- Fred Schelke (2002)
- Red Smith (2004)
- Yonnie Starr (1979)
- Alfred I. Taylor (1987)
- Johnny J. Thorpe (2002)
- Robert P. Tiller (2008)
- Dan Vella (2024)
- John R. Walker (2000)
- James White (1996)
- Ed Whyte (2001)
- Arthur H. Warner (1984)

=== Standardbred drivers and trainers ===
- Earle Avery (1977)
- Ralph N. Baldwin (1977)
- Douglas S. Brown (2006)
- Blair Burgess (2017)
- Duncan R. (Dunc) Campbell (1983)
- John Campbell (1987)
- Clifford Chapman, Sr. (1989)
- John Chapman (1979)
- Chris Christoforou (2023)
- Keith Clark (2009)
- Steve Condren (2011)
- Johnny Conroy (1983)
- Benoit Cote (1981)
- Ross Curran (2024)
- Jack Darling (2022)
- Jim Doherty (2018)
- Ron Feagan (1980)
- Hervé Filion (1976)
- Sylvain Filion (2024)
- Yves Filion (2016)
- Dr. John Findley (1997)
- Stewart Firlotte (2005)
- William (Bud) Fritz (2001)
- Vic Fleming (1976)
- Clint Galbraith (1998)
- William Gale (2015)
- Gilles Gendron (2022)
- Jules Giguere (1990)
- William "Buddy" Gilmour (1988)
- Shelly Goudreau (1983)
- John Hayes (1991)
- Jacques Hebert (2006)
- Wally Hennessey (2014)
- Clint Hodgins (1977)
- William R. Hood (2000)
- Carl Jamieson (2013)
- Jim Kealey (2002)
- William H. Keys (2002)
- Jack Kopas (1989)
- Gilles Lachance (1997)
- Michel Lachance (1993)
- Paul-Emile Larente (1985)
- Paul MacDonell (2020)
- Del MacTavish, Sr. (1982)
- David J. McClary (2002)
- Robert McIntosh (2010)
- Harold McKinley (1984)
- Ian Moore (2024)
- Joe O'Brien (1976)
- William O'Donnell (1986)
- Nealie Oliver (1990)
- David Pinkney (2001)
- Nathaniel D. Ray (1981)
- Ray Remmen (1991)
- Trevor Ritchie (2019)
- Vernon Weston Rowntree (2001)
- Heber M. Sweeny (2000)
- Silent Charley Sweet (2003)
- Jimmy Takter (2019) *
- Ed Tracey (2024)
- Allan Walker (1996)
- Dave Wall (2012)
- Ben Wallace (2020)
- Keith Waples (1978)
- Randy Waples (2021)
- Ron Waples (1986)
- Harold Francis Wellwood (2001)
- William Wellwood (2001)
- Ben White (1977)
- Roger White (1976)
- Mildred Williams (2012)

=== Builders ===
- Ernest D. Adams (1984)
- Robert Anderson (2015)
- William (Bill) Andrew (2018)
- Roland Armitage (1999)
- H. Charles Armstrong (2015)
- J. Elgin Armstrong (1976)
- Charles Franklyn Baker (1993)
- Bill Beasley (1985)
- Max Bell (1977)
- Russ & Lois Bennett (2007)
- Raymond Benoit (1985)
- Judge S. Tupper Bigelow (1991)
- Lucien Bombardier (1986)
- Ed Bradley (1993)
- Dr. Glen Brown (1995)
- James Brown (1979)
- Moe "Murray" Brown (2003)
- Jim Bullock (2021)
- Robert Burgess (2011)
- Charles F.W. Burns (1991)
- Michael Burns (1997)
- Chris Van Bussel (2004)
- George A. Callbeck (1978)
- James Cuthbert Cameron (1978)
- Louis E. Cauz (2008)
- Cliff Chapman Jr. (2008)
- Lloyd Chisholm (1991)
- Dr. Ted Clarke (2014)
- Jim Coleman (1984)
- Dr. Michael Colterjohn (2016)
- Frank R. Conklin (2003)
- William J. Connelly (1985)
- Capt. John T. Cruickshank (1985)
- Lou Davies (1977)
- Robert T. Davies (2001)
- Jack Diamond (1977)
- H. Allan Dickenson (1981)
- Milt Dunnell (1991)
- Albert E. Dyment (2001)
- Nathaniel Dyment (2001)
- Leslie Ehrlick (1985)
- John Ferguson (2016)
- Charles E. Fipke (2022)
- Donald (Buckets) Fleming (1992)
- Ian Fleming (2019)
- Cameron J.D. Fraser (1984)
- George Frostad (1999)
- George R. Gardiner (2000)
- Georges Giguere (1978)
- Dr. Gordon Gilbertson (2017)
- Tommy Gorman (1977)
- Elizabeth Arden Graham (2003)
- Jack Graham (1990)
- W. (Bill) D. Graham (2014)
- John Grant (1998)
- Dr. Brad H. Gunn (1981)
- Moira Gunn (2024)
- G. Sydney Halter (1988)
- Jack Hardy (2001)
- Stanley Harrison (1979)
- Harry C. Hatch (2000)
- Herbert E. Hatch (1982)
- R. Peter Heffering (2010)
- George Campbell Hendrie (1977)
- William Hendrie (1976)
- Bill Herbert (1977)
- Jack Hood (2013)
- W. J. Hyatt (2011)
- Lew James (1987)
- Samuel Johnston (2013)
- Charles Juravinski (2012)
- Jim Keeling Sr. (2001)
- A.G. (Scotty) Kennedy (1983)
- Jack H. Kenney (1990)
- Sydney J. Langill (1977)
- Mel P. Lawson (2010)
- Raymond Lemay (1983)
- Jean-Louis Lévesque (1976)
- Sue Leslie (2020)
- Pierre Levesque (2008)
- Irving Liverman (2002)
- Lily A. Livingston (2011)
- Mike MacCormac (2000)
- Lt.-Col. Dan MacKinnon (1976)
- Leslie E. MacLeod (2001)
- Col. K.R. (Rud) Marshall (2015)
- Sam McBride (2000)
- Don McClelland (2004)
- Lloyd S. McKibbin (2023)
- Col. Samuel McLaughlin (1977)
- Jack McNiven (2007)
- Dr. W. N. Meldrum (2002)
- Eugene Melnyk (2017)
- Maurice Michaud (1976)
- Aubrey W. Minshall (2012)
- Adrien Miron (1977)
- John J. Mooney (1984)
- W.F. (Willie) Morrissey (2001)
- Bory Margolus (2019)
- Robert Murphy (2014)
- Ryland H. New (2002)
- Abe Orpen (1980)
- Victoria (Vicki) Pappas (2021)
- T. C. Patteson (1976)
- J. Samuel Perlman (1977)
- Merv Peters (1993)
- James (Jimmy) W. Power (2000)
- Jim Proudfoot (2003)
- S.W. (Sam) Randall (1978)
- Larry Regan (1989)
- Cmdr J.K.L. Ross (1976)
- The Hon. Earl Rowe (1976)
- William Rowe (2013)
- Ernie Samuel (1998)
- Tammy Samuel-Balaz (2011)
- Gustav Schickedanz (2009)
- George (Judge) Schilling (1977)
- Joseph E. Seagram (1976)
- Frank J. Selke (2003)
- Oliver B. Sheppard (2000)
- Jack Short (1987)
- John G. Sikura (2018)
- John Sikura Jr. (2013)
- R. Glenn Sikura (2023)
- Claire C. Smith (1991)
- Conn Smythe (1977)
- Robert James Speers (1976)
- Walter Sprague (1989)
- Jack Stafford (horse racing) (1982)
- Steve Stavro (2006)
- Arthur W. Stollery (2014)
- Frank Stronach (2002)
- Austin C. Taylor (1976)
- Charles Taylor (1996)
- E. P. Taylor (1976)
- Joe Thomas (1985)
- Glen Todd (2024)
- Gabe Trahan (1986)
- Gerard Veilleux (1977)
- Max Webster (1991)
- Eric Whebby (1999)
- John White (1996)
- Lee Williams (1982)
- Katherine Langdon Wilks (1981)
- David S. Willmot (2005)
- Donald G. Willmot (1991)
- James Wright (1983)

== See also ==
- American National Museum of Racing and Hall of Fame
- American Harness Racing Museum & Hall of Fame
- Australian Racing Hall of Fame
- British National Horseracing Museum
- New Zealand Racing Hall of Fame
