= Ernie Hammond =

Australian rules footballer, born 1910

Personal information
- Full name: Edward Ernest Hammond
- Born: 26 June 1910; Murchison, Victoria
- Died: 5 May 1988 (aged 77); Murchison, Victoria

Playing career^{1}
Years	Club	Games (Goals)
1935	North Melbourne	4 (0)
- ^{1} Playing statistics correct to the end of 1935.

Edward Ernest Hammond (26 June 1910 – 5 May 1988) was an Australian rules footballer who played with North Melbourne in the Victorian Football League (VFL).
