= Judith Mappin =

Canadian bookseller

Judith Mappin (née Taylor; died 14 February 2014) was a Canadian businesswoman and philanthropist. She was the daughter of businessman E. P. Taylor, and she was a trustee of the Charles Taylor Prize for Canadian non-fiction literature, named after her late brother Charles.

== Life and career ==
She was born in Toronto and remained there during her youth. She studied at McGill University in Montreal, earning a Bachelor of Science degree in 1950. She continued to live in Montreal with her husband, John N. Mappin.

From 1974 to 2005, Mappin operated the Double Hook bookstore in Montreal, which sold only Canadian books. Her promotion of Canadian literature earned her a President's Award of Distinction in 2005 from the Association of Canadian Publishers. She also served on the jury for the 1999 Giller Prize for Canadian fiction.

She founded scholarship programs at McGill University, one in 2000 for undergraduate environmental studies and another in 2002 for graduate students in women's health studies.

In 2006, she received an honorary doctorate from McGill, alongside Jean Béliveau and Governor General Michaëlle Jean. Her appointment as a Member of the Order of Canada was announced on 1 July 2008. The Global and Mail and others have called Mappin a 'heroine of Canadian literature' for her pioneering efforts in the field.

Mappin died 14 February 2014.
