= Windfields Farm (Ontario) =

Canadian horse racing and breeding operation (1936–2009)

Coordinates: 43°57′13.9″N 78°53′56.5″W

Windfields Farm Limited
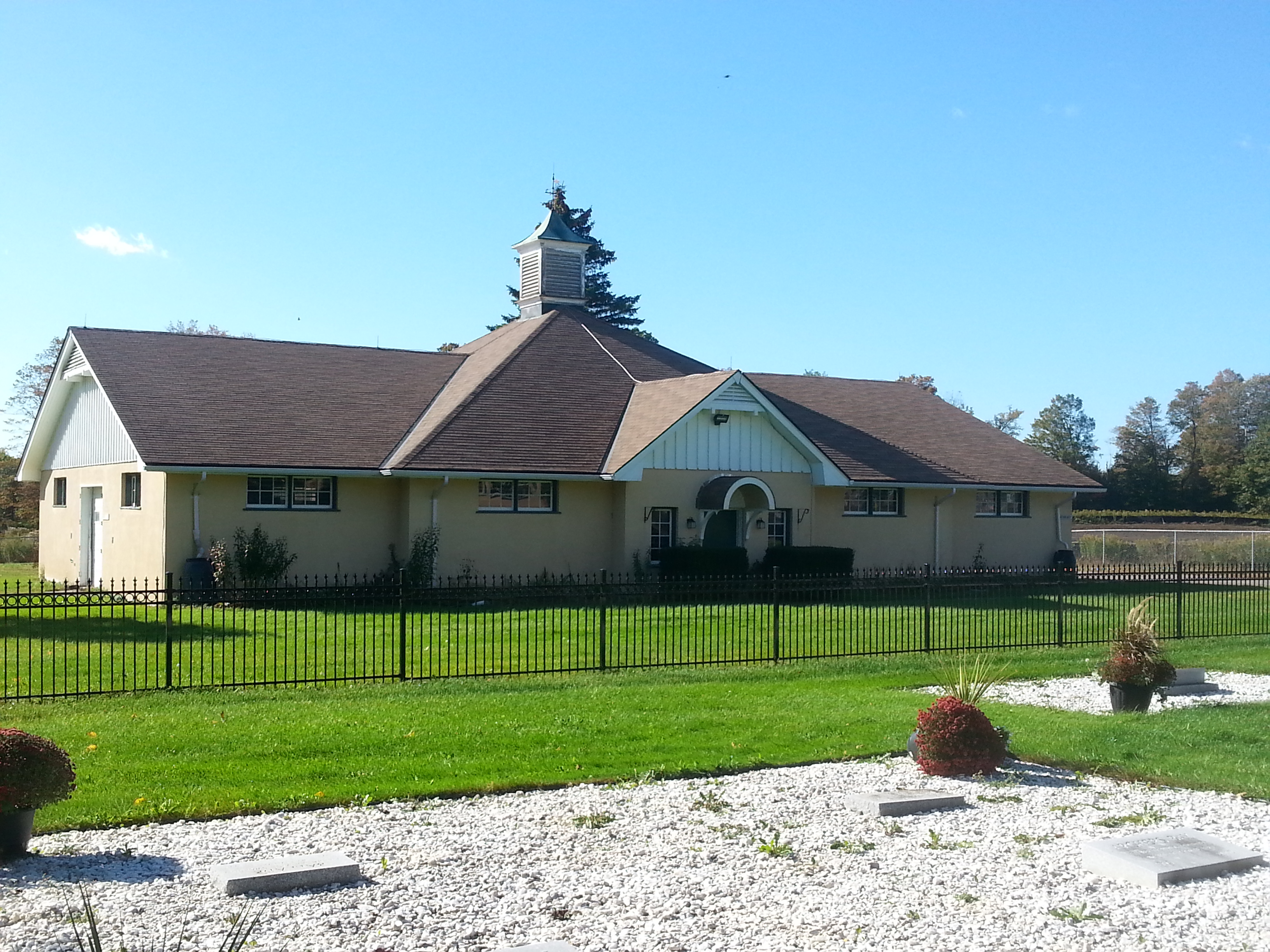
- Type: Private
- Industry: Equine
- Founded: 1936
- Founder: Edward Plunkett Taylor
- Defunct: 2009
- Headquarters: Oshawa, Ontario, Canada
- Key people: 1) Edward Plunkett Taylor, founder (1936–1980); 2) Charles P. B. Taylor, owner/operator (1980–1997); 3) Noreen Taylor and Judith Taylor Mappin, owners/operators (1997–2009); Hall of Fame Trainers: Gordon J. "Pete" McCann; Horatio Luro; Macdonald Benson
- Services: Horse breeding and racing
- Divisions: Windfields Farm (Maryland)

Windfields Farm was a six square kilometre (1,500 acre) Thoroughbred horse breeding farm that was founded by businessman E. P. Taylor in Oshawa, Ontario, Canada.

== Origin ==
The first stable and breeding operation of E. P. Taylor originated with a property north of the city of Toronto on Bayview Avenue. Taylor then acquired the Parkwood Stable in Oshawa when it was offered for sale in 1950 by Colonel Sam McLaughlin (of McLaughlin Motor Car Company fame), and he named his new purchase the National Stud Farm. In 1969, the name was changed to Windfields Farm Limited, Oshawa Division. As population growth overtook the operation, it eventually expanded to include a second farm, Windfields Farm (Maryland) in Chesapeake City, Maryland, United States.

== Northern Dancer ==
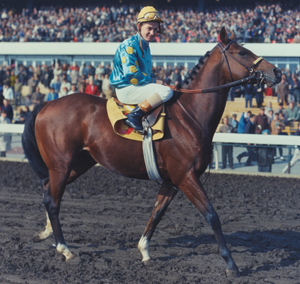
Northern Dancer

Windfields Farm in Ontario was the birthplace of racing great and champion sire Northern Dancer, winner of the 1964 Kentucky Derby (in stakes record time), the Preakness Stakes, and the Queen's Plate. Northern Dancer was retired after the 1964 racing season and started a career at stud in Ontario, before being moved in 1969 to the Maryland farm. Northern Dancer's son, the English Triple Crown winner Nijinsky, was also bred by E. P. Taylor at Windfields in Ontario, as was another Northern Dancer colt, the 1977 Epsom Derby winner The Minstrel.

== Decline and closure ==
In 1980, E. P. Taylor was incapacitated by a stroke, and his son Charles took over management of Windfields Farm. E.P. Taylor died in 1989 and Charles died in 1997, after which his widow Noreen and sister Judith Taylor Mappin took charge of the business. The Maryland site was sold in 1988.

The downsizing that began following the death of E. P. Taylor resulted in large portions of Windfields Farm being sold to the University of Ontario Institute of Technology (now Ontario Tech University) and Durham College, which erected sports fields and parking lots on the farm's southeast corner. Farmlands on the east side of Simcoe Street became housing developments. By 2008, the once-vast estate (that at its peak was home to more than 600 thoroughbreds) had devolved to just a small private farm.

In November 2009, the Windfields Farm breeding operations were wound up. Its broodmares and weanlings were sent to be auctioned at the Canadian Thoroughbred Horse Society Winter Mixed Sale.

== Post closure ==
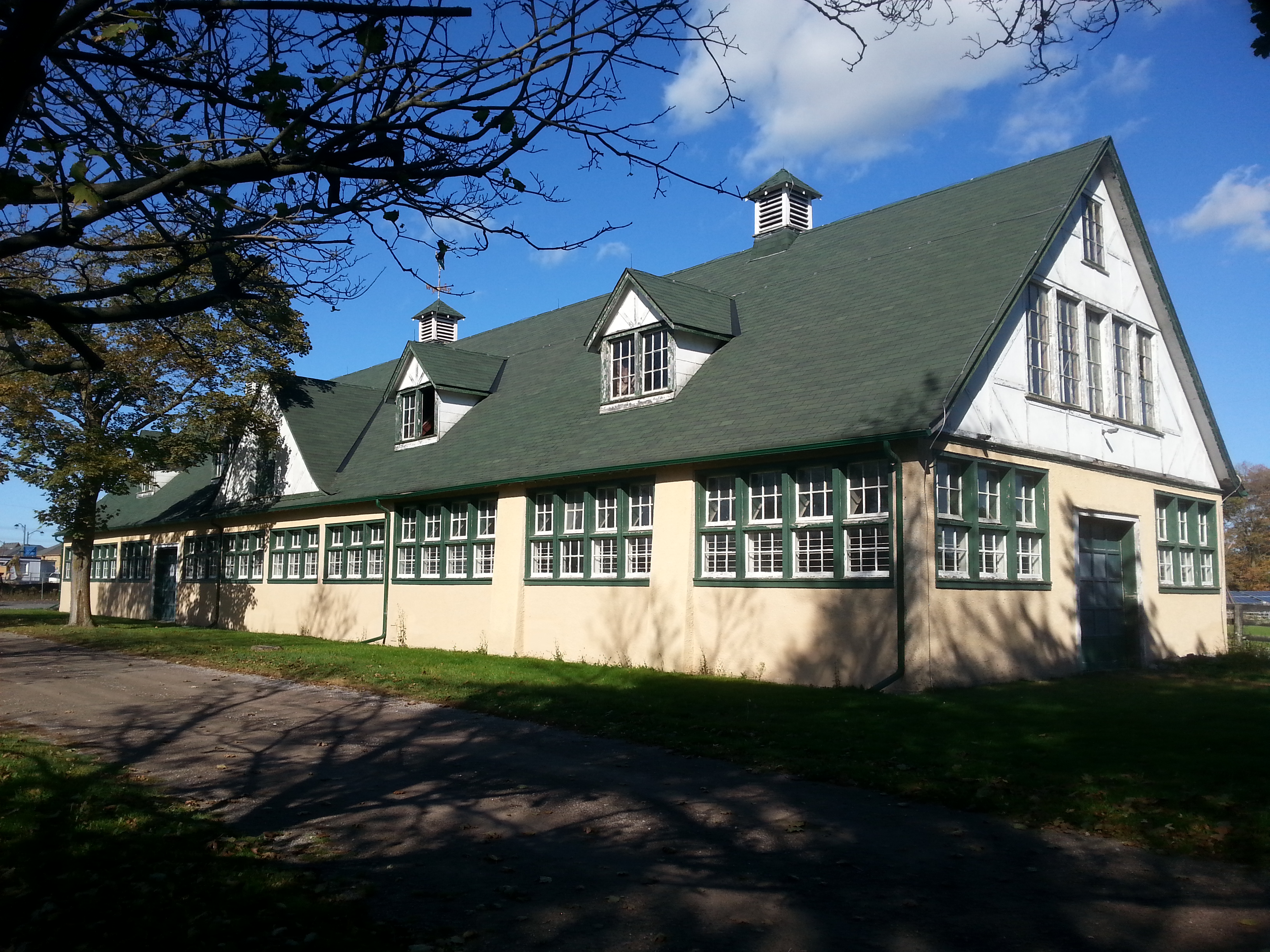
Stables

In the fall of 2012, the City of Oshawa became an ally to the cause for proper respect for the Windfields Farm property and its legacy. At the behest of the city, UOIT agreed to form a "Community Advisory Group".

In 2016, the city of Oshawa followed up on some earlier plans with a "Proposed Program for Honouring the Windfields Farm Legacy" document detailing some studies funded by an earlier controversial donation of $150,000 by Minto Developments. The results, under the banner "Program for Honouring the Windfields Farm Legacy" were adopted.

After the sale of Windfields Farm, the burial site of Northern Dancer and other Windfields thoroughbreds of the farm was not publicly accessible for many years, at one point becoming covered in weeds. On April 16, 2018, Northern Dancer's grave became an official heritage site under the Ontario Heritage Act, with funds presented by the City of Oshawa to landscape the surrounding area.

== Former paddock lands development ==
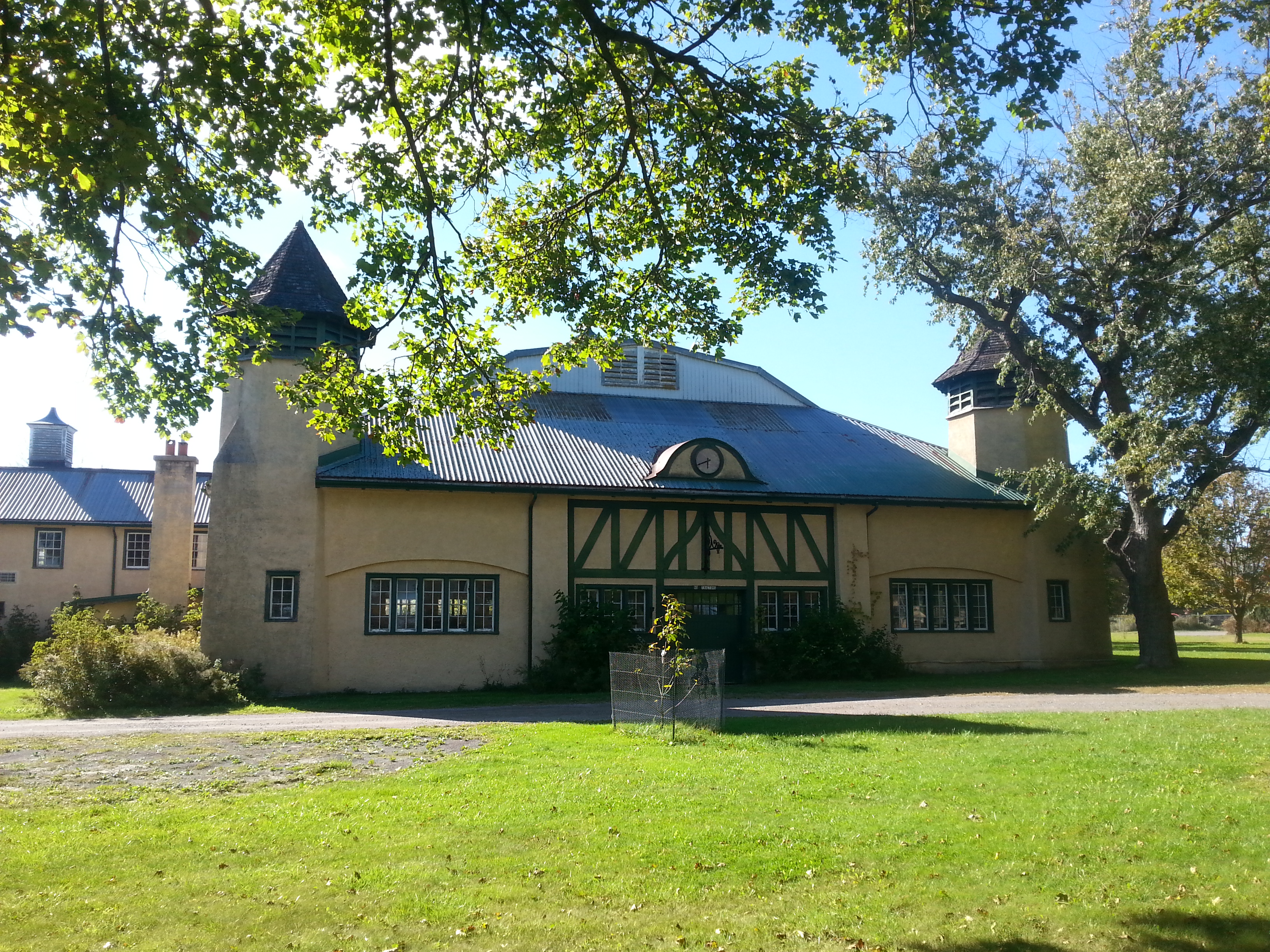
Stables

In 2018, development of the majority of what used to be paddocks and open fields to the north of the core of the farm (some 115 acres (47 ha)) began on a new residential neighbourhood, with several streets now bordering onto the core of the farm itself. A large retail complex is also planned for the northeast portion of this section of property.

== Burials at Windfields Farm ==
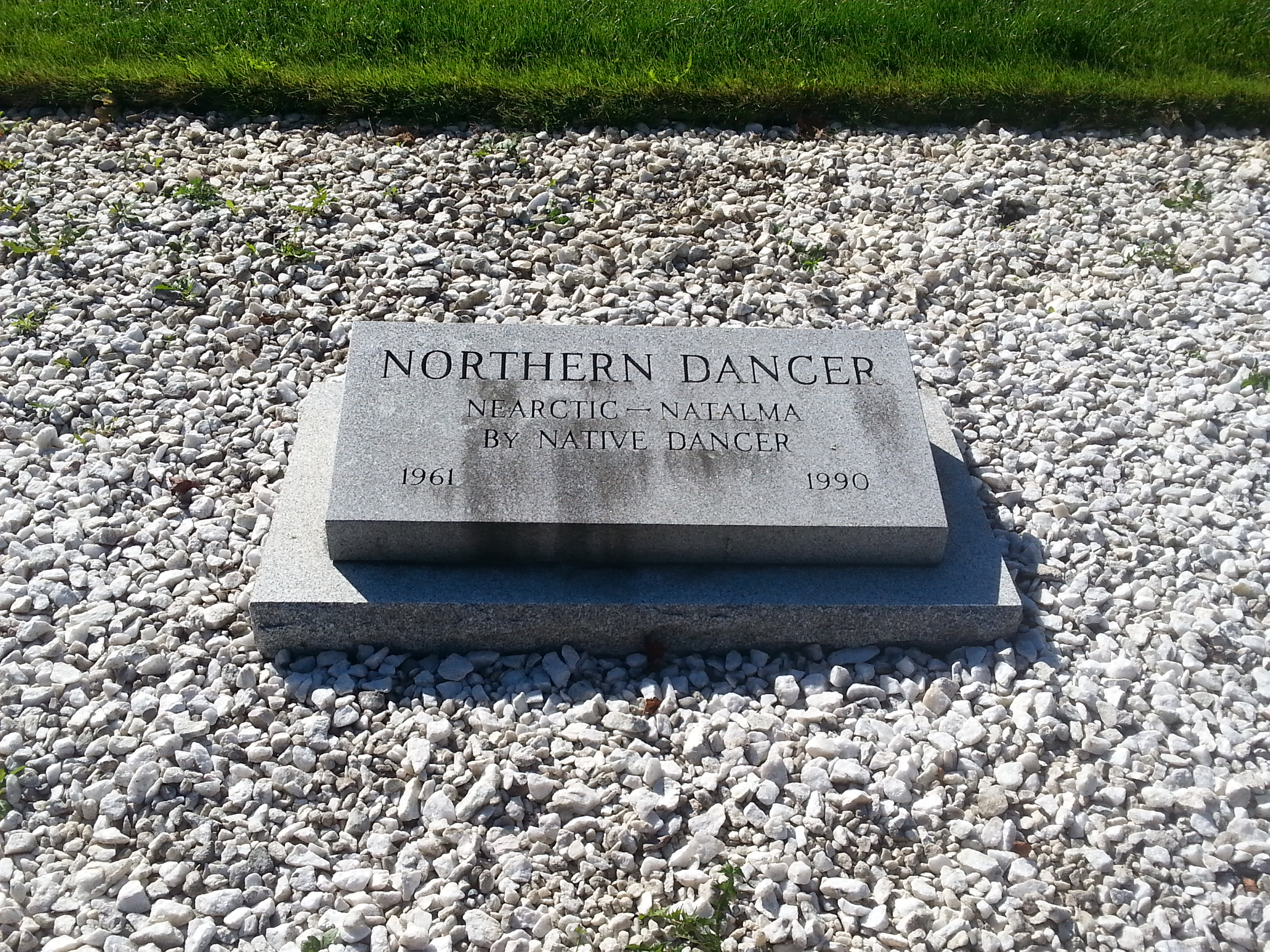
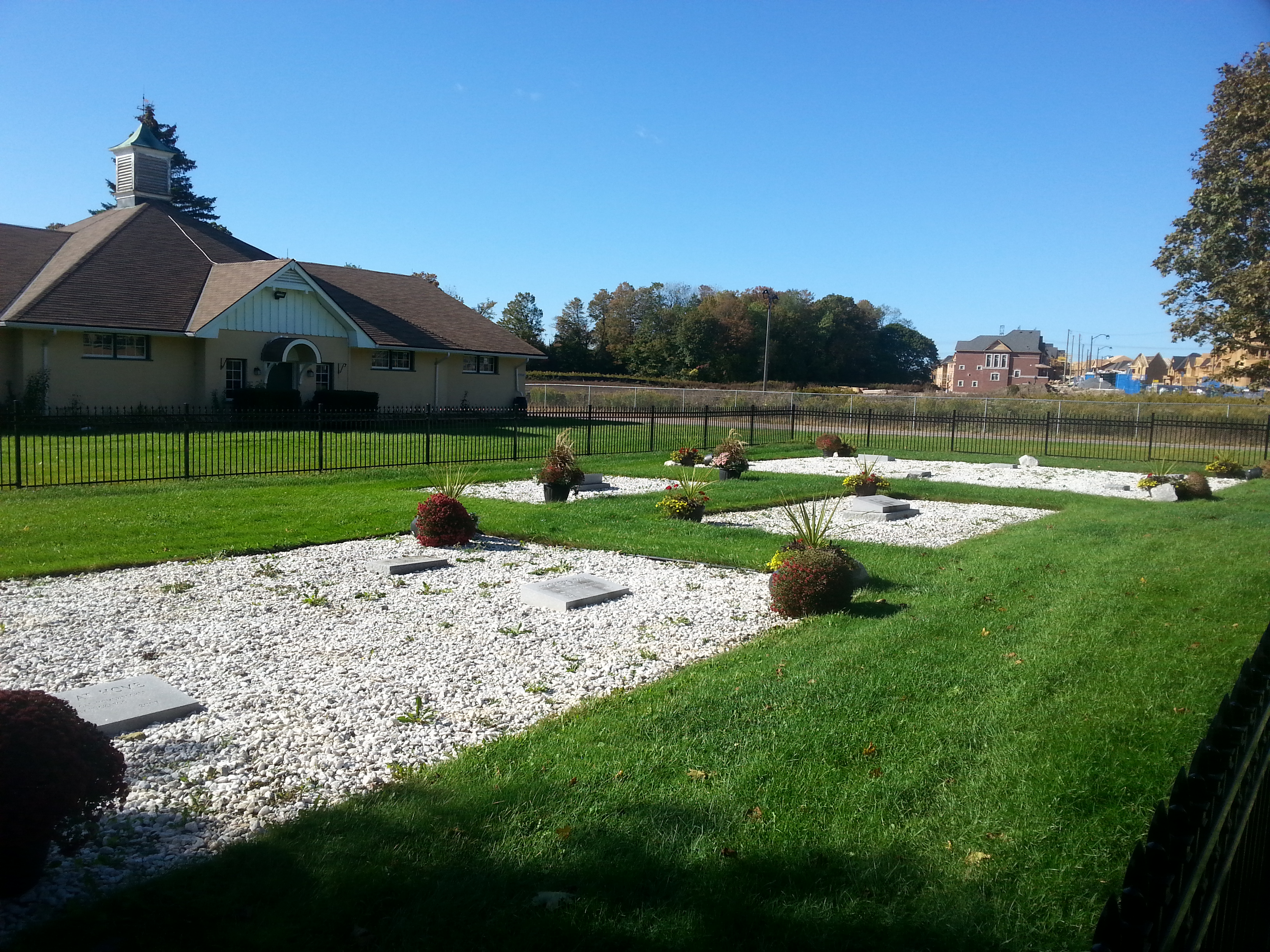
Northern Dancer's grave and the main cemetery

A non-exhaustive list of thoroughbred burials at Windfields Farm in Oshawa include:

- Archers Bay (1995–2002)
- Canadiana (1950–1971)
- New Providence (1956–1981)
- Northern Dancer (1961–1990)
- South Ocean (1967–1989)
- Vice Regent (1967–1995)
- Victoria Park (1957–1985)
- Windfields (1943–1969)

== Windfields Estate ==
Windfields Estate was the home of E. P. Taylor and was situated at 2489 Bayview Avenue in North York, Ontario, a suburb of Toronto. It now houses the Canadian Film Centre, founded by filmmaker Norman Jewison. The 10 hectares (25 acres) estate has been preserved as a heritage site.
