= E. P. Taylor =

Canadian business tycoon, investor and philanthropist

E. P. Taylor CMG
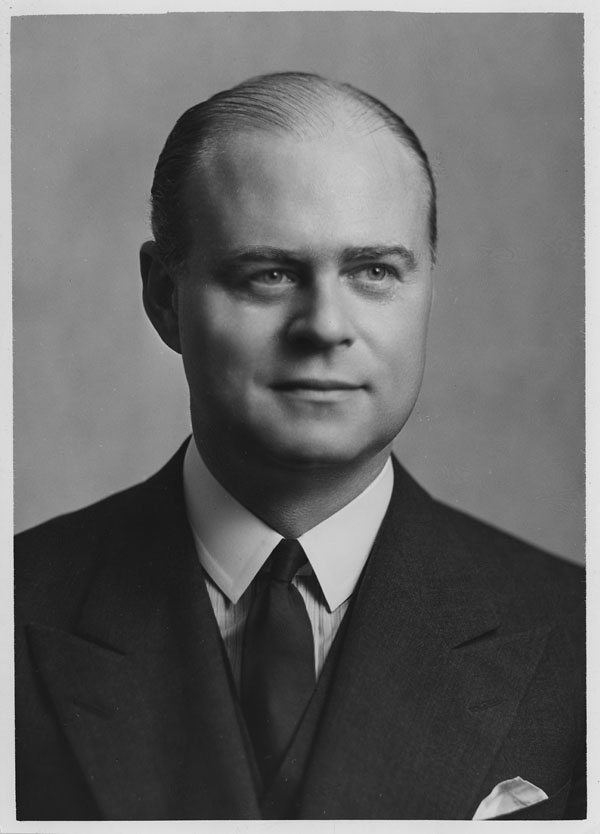
- Edward Plunkett Taylor
- Born: Edward Plunket Taylor; January 29, 1901; Ottawa, Ontario, Canada
- Died: May 14, 1989 (aged 88); Lyford Cay, Bahamas
- Education: Ashbury College
- Alma mater: McGill University
- Occupations: Businessman, philanthropist and racehorse owner/breeder
- Known for: Argus Corporation, Windfields Farm, Northern Dancer
- Board member of: Argus Corporation, Canadian Breweries Ltd., Massey Ferguson Ltd., B.C. Forest Products Ltd., Dominion Tar & Chemical Co., Honey Dew Co., Ontario Jockey Club, Trust Corporation of the Bahamas, Lyford Cay Development Corp.
- Spouse: Winnifred Thornton Duguid (m. 1927; died 1982)
- Children: 3, including Judith and Charles
- Awards: Sovereign Award for Outstanding Breeder (1976, 1985); Eclipse Award for Outstanding Breeder (1977, 1983)
- Honors: Canada's Sports Hall of Fame (1974); Canadian Racing Hall of Fame – Builder (1976); E. P. Taylor Stakes; E. P. Taylor Turf Course at Woodbine Racetrack; Keeneland Mark of Distinction (1982); American Racing Hall of Fame – Pillar of the Turf (2014)

Edward Plunket Taylor, CMG (January 29, 1901 – May 14, 1989), was a Canadian business tycoon, investor, and philanthropist. He was a famous breeder of Thoroughbred race horses, and a major force behind the evolution of the Canadian horse-racing industry. Known to his friends as "Eddie," he is all but universally recorded as "E. P. Taylor".

== Early years ==
Taylor was the first child of Plunket Bourchier Taylor and Florence Magee Taylor. Taylor attended Ashbury College and Ottawa Collegiate. During World War I, his father enlisted and the family moved to London, England. After Taylor attempted several times to join the British Army, his father sent him back to Ottawa to live with his grandfather Charles Magee, a wealthy Ottawa businessman. The time spent with Magee had a profound influence on Taylor, who decided he wanted to be successful in business like Magee. In 1918, Taylor moved to Montreal to attend McGill University, having to work part-time to pay his way. That fall, Taylor's studies were interrupted when McGill closed during the Spanish flu pandemic. Returning the next winter, Taylor graduated in 1922 with a Bachelor of Science degree in Mechanical Engineering.

While studying at McGill, Taylor patented an electric toaster design that browned both sides of the bread simultaneously. At that time, toasters toasted only one side of the bread. Taylor sold the patent for a royalty of 40 cents on every toaster to the Thomas Davidson Manufacturing Co. of Montreal. Taylor decided during college that he did not want to pursue engineering, finding that he was more interested in business and economics. After graduation, Taylor returned to Ottawa, where he and Lawrie Hart operated a two-vehicle bus line between Westboro and Ottawa. Taylor and Hart sold the bus line after a year, and Taylor joined the investment brokerage firm of McLeod Young Weir (now ScotiaMcLeod) that his father worked for.

In 1926, Taylor met Winifred Duguid while at a social event at the Chaudiere Golf Club. They were married on June 15, 1927, at Christ Church Cathedral in Ottawa, honeymooned in Lake Placid, and settled into their first residence at the Strathcona Apartments on Laurier Avenue in Ottawa.

== Business ==
Taylor's grandfather Charles Magee was a successful businessman in Ottawa, holding interests in brewing, dry goods, and transportation. Magee died in 1918, leaving the family businesses to his brother and his daughters Carrie and Taylor's mother. In 1923, Taylor was made a director of the Brading Brewery, one of the family businesses, and which his father was president. On the side of selling securities and the brewing business, Taylor organized the Red Line Taxi Company in 1923. Like the bus line, it was sold after a year. That established the pattern in business that Taylor would follow, conceiving and developing ideas, and then persuading others to buy them. Taylor remained with McLeod, Young, Weir and became a partner in 1928. In 1928, Taylor and Winifred moved to Toronto, getting an apartment on University Avenue, conveniently close to the McLeod, Young, Weir offices in the Metropolitan Building.

In the 1920s, Brading Brewery was limited by temperance laws. While it operated in Ontario, it could sell only into Quebec. That changed in 1927, when the Conservative government in Ontario ended prohibition. At the suggestion of Taylor, the company "traded on its equity" and rebuilt its plant, modernizing it and increasing capacity by 50%. Taylor studied the brewing business in Ontario. In 1928, there were 37 breweries. They operated at below capacity and many were in need of modernization. They were not profitable in general and had only CA$12 million in sales on assets of CA$24 million. Quebec was dominated by three breweries; one of them, National Breweries, had consolidated 14 breweries that had operated before World War I. Taylor proposed a similar strategy to Brading's board of directors: acquire and merge with successful breweries in Ontario, and acquire and close other breweries to bring under its control some 70% of the volume of beer sold in Ontario.

The stock market crash of 1929 affected Taylor in two ways. On the one hand, the underwriting business virtually ceased. However, it left Taylor free to pursue the brewery acquisition plan although now Taylor could offer only Brading Brewery shares in its acquisitions. Taylor fortuitously met Clark Jennison, who was acting for British interests interested in investing in Canadian breweries at the same time and had CA$500,000 to invest. The two incorporated a new firm, Brewing Corporation of Ontario, and merged the Brading and Kuntz breweries and the British interests into common and preferred shares. Another company, Canadian Brewery Corporation Limited, had also begun acquiring breweries in Ontario. Taylor approached the company and successfully negotiated a merger in 1930. Later in 1930, Taylor successfully took over the Carling Brewery, which had become majority-owned by the Dominion Bank, for CA$600,000 repayable at $100,000 per year. In all, Taylor merged more than 20 other small breweries into Canadian Breweries Limited, which grew to be the world's largest brewing company. Taylor would eventually gain operating control of the holding company.

Taylor described his consolidation approach as "trading pieces of paper for other pieces of paper." At times, he was so cash poor that a legend had him passing cheques back and forth between two bank accounts in Montreal and Toronto to meet payroll. He later recalled it as "a period of hectic finance." His liquidity situation eased after prohibition ended. After 1934, Taylor implemented a number of changes to make the brewing sales and marketing respectable by firing the old-school "runners" who profited by selling to bootleggers and replacing them with salesmen who were encouraged to become community leaders. He also consolidated the number of brands offered from over 100 to just six.

Taylor became involved in the soft drink industry through the acquisition of brewers, who had diversified into soft drinks during prohibition. Unable to spin off the soft drinks at first, Taylor first worked on building them into a business suitable for sale. Taylor purchased control of the Canadian Orange Crush company and then taking control of its subsidiary Honey Dew. Honey Dew had multiple retail locations, which Taylor restyled and relocated to increase their profitability. That formed the core of his "food empire," which included over 100 stores by 1950 (not including his subsequent interest in Dominion grocery stores). Taylor spun off Honey Dew as a separate company, which later became Canadian Food Products.

During World War II, Taylor was a volunteer executive in the Government of Canada's war effort. He was appointed by C. D. Howe, the Minister of Munitions and Supply, to the executive committee of the Department of Munitions and Supply and would be appointed by Winston Churchill to run the British Supply Council in North America. He came close to losing his life when, in December 1940, the ship he was on was torpedoed while crossing the Atlantic. At the time, regulations were such that convoys did not stop to rescue survivors of a sinking ship. Taylor and others, including Howe and Bill Woodward, were rescued by a merchant vessel that had lost its convoy. A destroyer appeared, gave permission to save them, and circled the rescue to ward off any submarines.

In 1941, Taylor clashed with Mackenzie King, who had called for a wartime curtailment of beer drinking and advertising. Taylor sent a letter to the Ottawa Journal calling that position "un-British and therefore undemocratic."

Through his war-time service, Taylor became connected to top businessmen from across Canada and around the world. For his wartime service, he was appointed a Companion of the Order of St Michael and St George in 1946. At war's end, he founded Argus Corporation, becoming the investment company's majority shareholder by rolling Canadian Breweries stock into the new entity. Over the years, he gained control or had significant positions in many of his country's largest companies such as Canadian Food Products, Massey-Harris, Standard Chemical, Dominion Stores, British Columbia Forest Products Limited, Dominion Tar & Chemical Co., Standard Broadcasting, and Hollinger Mines. During the highest point of his career, he was one of Canada's richest people.

In 1950, Taylor said of his position in Canadian industry, "I simply own the largest piece of the largest piece." According to Maclean's Magazine, he owned 5/17 of Argus Corp.'s common stock at the time, giving him effective control of the company. In turn, Argus owned 3/10 of Standard Chemical (Javex, Goderich Salt, etc.). Standard Chemical owned 9/20 of Dominion Tar and Chemical (Sifto Salt, Ace-Tex, Fiberglas, etc.). Through the series of ownership shares, Taylor effectively controlled Dominion Tar even though his personal interest in the voting stock amounted to only about 4%.

Taylor traveled extensively to manage his sprawling business interests and flew each month to the Cleveland headquarters of his Brewing Corporation of America. From there, he headed to New York, where he spent much of his time associating with Floyd Odlum of Atlas Corporation, an investment company that served as the prototype for Argus. He would then travel to Montreal and back to Toronto again. His executives were expected to make their reports rapidly, with meetings scheduled at 15-minute intervals. He valued energy, judgement and the ability to get along with others, once saying that a genius is more trouble than he's worth.

In 1948, Taylor and a small group of fellow alumni established the McGill University Alma Mater Fund, inviting all graduates to give annual donations and thereby "make of themselves a living endowment."

Taylor also pioneered the concept of gated communities in exotic places. In 1957, the Bahamian government passed the Lyford Cay Development Company, Limited, Agreement and Road Diversion Act 1957 providing for the development of land in western New Providence by the company and Taylor and for the diversion of West Bay Street to accommodate it. Taylor founded the highly-exclusive Lyford Cay gated community in 1959 and its Lyford Cay Club on New Providence island in the Bahamas. The Lyford Cay Club is home to some of the world's wealthiest people.

In 1975, the Argus Corporation became the target of a takeover by Power Corporation. Taylor sold his non-voting shares to Power Corp and held his voting shares for one year to allow his Argus partners to purchase them. The partners did not take them up. In 1976, Taylor retired from Argus Corporation, selling his 10% share of the voting shares to Power Corporation.

== Thoroughbred racing ==
While a student at Montreal's McGill University in 1918, Taylor was introduced to the sport of thoroughbred horse racing at Blue Bonnets Raceway. As a businessman in the 1930s he established Cosgrave Stable to race horses, which notably owned and raced the future (2000) Canadian Horse Racing Hall of Fame filly Mona Bell, winner of the 1938 Breeders' Stakes and Maple Leaf Stakes.

After the second World War, Taylor became steadily more involved in horse racing as an owner, breeder and organizer. In the latter role, he transformed the Ontario racing scene in the 1950s much the way he had earlier transformed the brewing industry. "Our sport wasn't keeping up with the progress made in other areas," he once said. "We had too many tracks... our patronage was falling, we had low purses and many bad horses, and I was afraid that racing might die here as it did in Quebec." Instead of operating fourteen racetracks each with 14-day race meetings, he concentrated the industry in Toronto and Fort Erie. In 1956, he opened "new" Woodbine racetrack on the outskirts of Toronto while renovating "old" Woodbine (subsequently renamed Greenwood racetrack). New Woodbine developed into a world-class venue, especially when Taylor convinced Penny Chenery to have Secretariat make his final start in the Canadian International in 1973. Taylor was the founder of the Jockey Club of Canada and served as the president of the Thoroughbred Racing Association in the United States.

Taylor and his wife began breeding thoroughbreds in the 1950s. He first purchased a property in Toronto that he named Windfields Farm. He then acquired Parkwood Stable in Oshawa, which he first renamed as the National Stud and was later called Windfields Farm. Determined to raise the standard of Canadian breeding stock, Taylor imported several stallions from the United States. The most notable of these was Chop Chop, who went on to sire four Queen's Plate winners for Taylor including Canadiana and Victoria Park, who also became a leading Canadian sire.

The Taylor thoroughbred horse breeding operation produced Northern Dancer, who in 1964 became the first Canadian-bred horse to win the Kentucky Derby. Northern Dancer then became arguably the greatest sire and sire of sires of the 20th century, whose impact on the breed is still felt worldwide. In 1970, Taylor was the world's leading horse breeder measured by money won. He was voted Thoroughbred racing's man of the year in 1973 and the following year was elected to Canada's Sports Hall of Fame. In 1977 and 1983 he was named the winner of the Eclipse Award for Outstanding Breeder in North America. Taylor's horses won 15 Queen's Plate races and were named Canadian Horse of the Year nine times.

== Residences ==
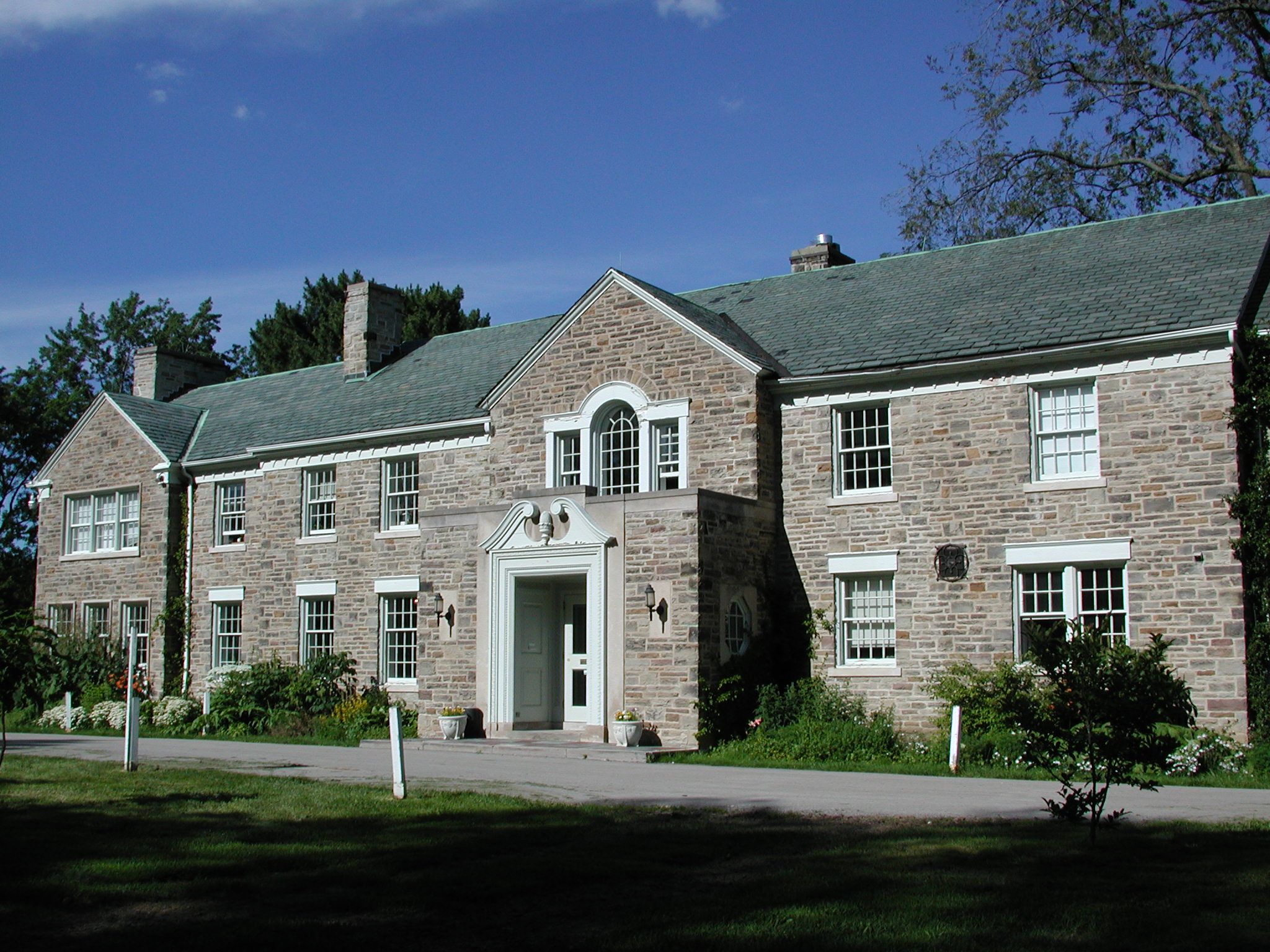
Windfields Estate in 2000

Windfields Estate was Taylor's main residence and was situated at 2489 Bayview Avenue in Toronto. It is now the site of the Canadian Film Centre. The 25-acre (10 ha) estate has been preserved as a heritage site. The Canadian royal family often stayed at Windfields when they visited Toronto. The last royals to stay there were Queen Elizabeth the Queen Mother, in the summers of 1974 and 1981, and Prince Charles and Diana, Princess of Wales. There were many maids, two gardeners and a house manager who worked at the residence.

In 1963, Taylor moved to the Bahamas to take advantage of the warm climate and its inheritance tax laws. He lived in the gated community he had built called Lyford Cay. He died there in 1989 at the age of 88. A friend of US President John F. Kennedy, in December 1962, the President stayed at Taylor's home in Lyford Cay while he held talks with British Prime Minister Harold Macmillan.

His son, journalist and author Charles P. B. Taylor, died in 1997 at 62, after a nine-year battle with cancer.

== Legacy ==
Taylor's legacy lives on in various communities.

- The E.P. Taylor Research Library and Archives in the Art Gallery of Ontario, Toronto, Ontario, Canada, was named after him in honour of his term as President of the (then) Art Gallery of Toronto, from 1957 to 1959.
- In the North York region there is E.P. Taylor Place, a seniors residence.
  - Also on York Mills Road are Windfields Restaurant, a popular family establishment, and Windfields Place, a pair of apartment buildings.
- He has a pub named after him in Oshawa, Ontario on the campus of Durham College/University of Ontario Institute of Technology in the Student Centre, called E.P. Taylor's Pub and Restaurant.
- E.P. Taylor was inducted into the Ontario Sports Hall of Fame in 1996.
- The E. P. Taylor turf course at Woodbine, opened in 1994 and considered one of North America's finest, is named in his honour.
