= Mack (surname) =

Origin
- Word/name: Ireland, Scotland
- Meaning: "Son" in Gaelic

Mack as a surname may have multiple sources. One prominent source points to Germany, Mack being a common surname among German-Russian community. Another posisble source is Gaelic origin, meaning son. Mack is often used as a prefix in many Irish, and Scottish surnames, including MacCarthy and MacDermot. MacDonald, and MacGregor.

== Notable people ==
- Addi Mack (born 2007), American college basketball player
- Alexander Mack (1679–1739), German/American minister
- Alexander Mack (Medal of Honor) (c. 1834–1907), Civil War Medal of Honor recipient
- Alex Mack (born 1985), American football player
- Alizé Mack (born 1997), American football player
- Allison Mack (born 1982), American actor best known for her role in Smallville
- Andrew Mack (politician) (1780–1854), mayor of Detroit in 1834
- Andrew Mack (actor) (1863–1931), American actor and songwriter
- Austin Mack (born 1997), American football player
- Austin Mack (quarterback) (born 2006), American football player
- Betty Mack (1901–1980), American film actress
- Bill Mack (disambiguation), various people
- Brooklyn Mack, American ballet dancer
- Burton L. Mack (1931–2022), American theologian
- Cardae Mack (born 2007), American football player
- Cecil Mack (1883–1944), American composer, lyricist and music publisher
- Chris Mack (disambiguation), various people
- Christy Mack (born 1991), American former pornographic actress
- An American family that started in baseball and has moved into politics:
  - Connie Mack (1862–1956), baseball player, executive, and team owner
  - Earle Mack (1890–1967), Connie's son; baseball player
  - Connie Mack III (born 1940), grandson of Connie and nephew of Earle; politician
  - Connie Mack IV (born 1967), son of Connie III; politician
  - Mary Bono Mack (born 1961), wife of Connie IV; politician and widow of Sonny Bono
- Craig Mack (1970–2018), American rapper
- Darren Mack (born 1961), American criminal and fugitive
- Daryl Mack (1958–2006), American convicted murderer
- David Alan Mack, writer best known for his freelance Star Trek novels
- David Anthony Mack (born 1961), central figure in the LAPD Rampart police corruption scandal
- David S. Mack, American businessman
- Daylon Mack (born 1997), American football player
- Denny Mack (1851–1888), baseball player
- Earle I. Mack (born 1938), businessman and former US Ambassador
- Ebenezer Mack (1791–1849), New York politician
- Edward Mack (1826–1882), also known as E. Mack, was a German-American composer
- Elbert Mack (born 1986), American football cornerback
- Eric Mack (born 1946), American philosopher
- Eric N. Mack, American painter
- Eugen Mack (1907–1978), Swiss gymnast and Olympic Champion
- H. Bert Mack (1912–1992), American real estate developer
- Hans-Joachim Mack (1928–2008), German general
- Harriet Mack (1866–1954), American politician
- Helen Mack (1913–1986), American actress
- Ida May Mack, American classic female blues singer and songwriter
- Isaiah Mack (born 1996), American football player
- Jerome D. Mack (a.k.a. Jerry Mack) (1920–1998), American banker, real estate investor, political fundraiser and philanthropist in Las Vegas, Nevada
- Jillie Mack (born 1957), English stage actress
- Jimmy Mack (broadcaster) (1934–2004), Scottish radio and television presenter
- Joe Mack (disambiguation), various people
- John E. Mack (1929–2004), American psychiatrist, writer, and professor at Harvard Medical School
- John J. Mack (born 1944), CEO of Morgan Stanley
- John M. Mack (1864–1924), also known as Jack Mack, founder of Mack Trucks
- Karen Mack, American television producer for CBS and co-author of three novels from Los Angeles, California.
- Karl Mack von Leiberich (1752–1828), Austrian general, famous for his defeat at Ulm in Napoleon's campaign of 1805
- Katie Mack (astrophysicist), Australian astrophysicist
- Katie Mack (cricketer), Australian cricketer
- Kelley Mack (1992–2025), American actress
- Kevin Mack (disambiguation), multiple people
- Khalil Mack (born 1991), American football player
- King Mack (born 2004), American football player
- Kirby Mack (born 1983), American professional wrestler, went by the ring name Krazy K but is best known for the tag team, Team MackTion, that he formed with his brother T.J.
- Klaus Mack (born 1973), German politician
- Kyle Mack (born 1997), American freestyle snowboarder
- Ledarius Mack (born 1996), American football player
- Lee Mack (born 1968), stage name for English stand-up comedian Lee Gordon McKillop.
- Lonnie Mack (1941–2016), stage name of American blues-rock guitarist and singer, Lonnie McIntosh
- Max Mack (1884–1973), German silent screenwriter and film director
- Marlon Mack (born 1996), American football player
- Mary Mack, American stand-up comedian
- Mirren Mack, Scottish actress
- Myrna Mack (1949–1990), Guatemalan anthropologist, murdered because of her criticism towards the government's abuses during Guatemalan Civil War.
- Nate Mack (1891–1965), Polish-born American banker; co-founder of the Bank of Las Vegas.
- Norman Edward Mack (1855–1932), editor and publisher of the Buffalo Daily Times
- Oliver Mack (born 1957), retired American professional basketball player
- Parker Mack (born 1996), American actor
- Peter F. Mack, Jr. (1916–1986), former U.S. politician
- Ray Mack (1916–1969), American professional baseball player
- Raymond Mack (1927–2011), American sociologist
- Red Mack (1937–2021), American football wide receiver and halfback
- Reinhold Mack, record producer known for working with Electric Light Orchestra, Queen and other rock bands
- Rico Mack (born 1971), American football player
- Robert Mack (1959–2020), Austrian ice hockey player
- Rodney Mack, ring name of professional wrestler Rodney Begnaud
- Sir Ronald Mack, Australian politician
- Ronnie Mack (1940–1963), American songwriter
- Russell Mack (1892 – 1972) American vaudeville performer, stage actor, film director, and producer
- Sam Mack (born 1970), retired American professional basketball player
- Shane Mack (baseball) (born 1963), former left and center fielder
- Sherman Q. Mack (born 1972), Louisiana politician
- Shorty Mack (born 1981), international rapper and actor
- Steve Mack (born 1979), Tara Mack (born 1983), Minnesota politician and a member of the Minnesota House of Representatives
- Ted Mack (radio-TV host) (1904–1976), host of Ted Mack and the Original Amateur Hour on radio and television
- Timothy Mack (born 1972), American pole vaulter and Olympic champion
- Tom Mack (born 1943), former left guard
- Warner Mack (1935-2022), American musician
- Wayne Mack, sportscaster
- Willard Mack (1873–1934), Canadian-born actor, director, and playwright
- William Mack (disambiguation), various people
- Winfried Mack (born 1965), German politician

== Fictional characters ==
- Andi, Rebecca “Bex”, and Celia Mack from Disney Channel series Andi Mack
- The title character for the 1990s show The Secret World of Alex Mack
- Mark Mack, character in the HBO series Oz
