= John J. Cali =

American businessman

- Born: August 8, 1918; Tercio, Colorado, U.S.
- Died: February 1, 2014 (aged 95); Rancho Mirage, California, U.S.
- Education: Indiana University Bloomington (B.A.)
- Occupation: Real estate developer
- Known for: Co-founder of Mack-Cali Realty Corporation
- Spouse(s): Alice Balamouth (divorced); Renee Cali (deceased); Rose L. Caparulo (1973-2014; his death)
- Children: 5
- Parent(s): Vincenzo Filippo Cali and Maria Grazia (Drago) Cali

John J. Cali (August 8, 1918 – February 1, 2014) was an American businessman, real estate developer, and philanthropist.

== Biography ==
Cali was born in Tercio, Colorado, a coal mining town, and raised in Passaic, New Jersey, one of eight children born to Italian immigrants, Vincenzo Filippo Cali and Maria Grazia (Drago) Cali. He graduated from Clifton High School. He worked his way through college by playing saxophone and clarinet in jazz and swing bands eventually graduating from Indiana University Bloomington with a B.A. in sociology and psychology.

After school, he worked for the Western Electric Company and, in 1949, he co-founded Cali Associates with a brother, Angelo R. Cali, and a friend, Edward Leshowitz. Cali initially focused on residential properties building over 5,500 housing units in New Jersey before expanding into the development of commercial buildings in 1969. In 1989, he built the International Financial Center in Jersey City.

In 1994, the company went public as a real estate investment trust under the name Cali Realty Corporation, creating the first office REIT in New Jersey; he served as its chairman from 1994 until its 1997 merger with the Mack Company (founded by H. Bert Mack, and then operated by Mack's four sons Fredric, David, Earle, and William), creating Mack-Cali Realty Corporation, the largest office-property owner in New Jersey. He retired in 2000. Cali also was a co-founder of Cali Futures, which focuses on real estate investment projects in New Jersey.

== Philanthropy and awards ==
In 2008, Cali donated $5 million to Montclair State University to fund a school of music known as the John J. Cali School of Music. Cali served as president of the Office Developers Association of New Jersey. In 1996, he received the Ellis Island Medal of Honor.

== Personal life ==
Cali was married three times. His first marriage ended in divorce. His second marriage ended in 1973 after his wife, Renee, and his stepdaughter, Leslie Grant, were murdered in the basement of the family's home in Upper Montclair, New Jersey. The family's "window washer [Robert Del Petrarca] who had been occasionally employed by the Calis was later convicted in the murders."

His third marriage was to fellow Montclair State alumnus, Rose C. Cali. Cali was survived by his three children (Brant, Jonna, and Christopher Cali) and two stepchildren (Michael and Joshua Nevins).
