= Bertrand Camus =

French business executive (born 1967)

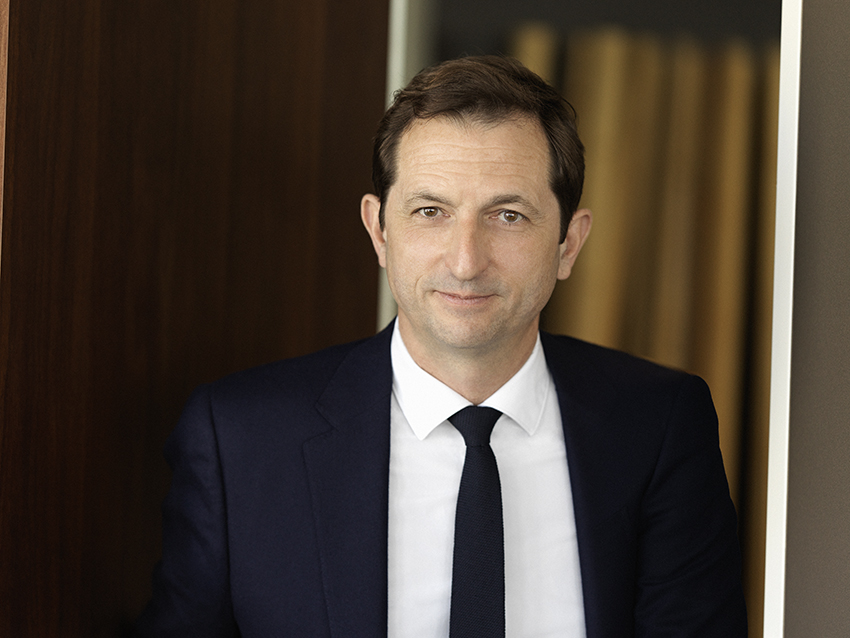
- Bertrand Camus in February 2019
- Born: 9 February 1967 (age 59)
- Education: École Nationale des Ponts et Chaussées
- Occupation: CEO of Suez
- Years active: 1991-present

Bertrand Camus (born 9 February 1967) is a French business executive, CEO of the water and waste management company Suez since 14 May 2019.

== Biography ==
=== Background ===
Bertrand Camus graduated from the École Nationale des Ponts et Chaussées in 1991.

=== Career ===
Camus receiving an honorary key to the City of Miami from Mayor Tomás Regalado

Bertrand Camus started his career working on financial projects at BNP Paribas, a position where he oversaw the construction of a water plant in Sydney, Australia. Bertrand Camus joined Suez in 1994, managing international projects from the Paris office. In 1998, he became the director of business development in the Asia-Pacific region.

He became COO of Aguas Argentinas in 2000, Director of Suez’ Internal Audit in 2006, and CEO of Suez North America in 2008, where he led the first private equity investment in a U.S. municipal water system (Bayonne, N.J.) in December 2012. In 2015, he was named Deputy CEO of Suez’ Water Europe and Water France divisions. In June 2017, he inaugurated the world’s largest underground wastewater treatment plant in Marseille, France.

In March 2018, he became Senior Executive VP for Suez in Africa, the Middle East, India, Asia and Australia. In June 2018, he announced Suez’ move in China’s market of hazardous water treatments through a joint-venture with China Everbright International.

=== CEO of Suez ===
In December 2018, Suez announced Bertrand Camus was appointed CEO of the group, nomination effective on 14 May 2019. When he accessed to the position in May, he reshuffled Suez’ executive committee. In June 2019, he was among 35 international CEOs to jointly launch the CEO Guide to Human Rights. In October 2019, he introduced Suez' 2030 strategy plan focused on international development, industrial partnerships and technology, and data-driven environmental solutions.

== Awards ==
- 2015: Rose and John J. Cali Award for Business Leadership and Community Engagement

== See also ==
- Suez
