= USS Callisto =

Tender of the United States Navy

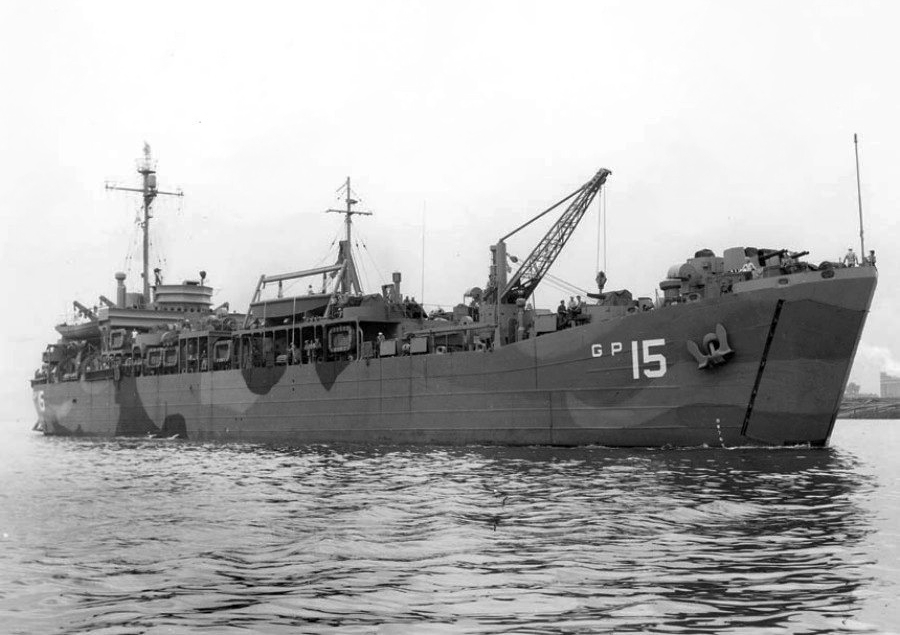
- USS Callisto (AGP-15) underway in Chesapeake Bay off Port Covington, Baltimore, Maryland, 19 June 1945, just after completion of conversion. This ship had one "A" frame hoist, to port.

History
- Name: LST-966; Callisto
- Namesake: Callisto, a nymph attendant of Artemis
- Builder: Bethlehem-Hingham Shipyard, Hingham, Massachusetts
- Yard number: 3436
- Laid down: 31 October 1944
- Launched: 29 November 1944
- Commissioned: 22 December 1944, reduced commission; 12 June 1945, full commission
- Decommissioned: 9 May 1946
- Identification: Hull symbol: LST-966; Hull symbol: AGP-15; Code letters: NJYI
- Fate: Sold for merchant service; Renamed, Elena; Renamed, Daytona; Lost, 20 November 1955

General characteristics
- Class & type: Portunus-class motor torpedo boat tender
- Displacement: 4,100 long tons (4,200 t)
- Length: 328 ft (100 m) oa
- Beam: 50 ft (15 m)
- Draft: 11 ft 2 in (3.40 m)
- Installed power: 2 × 900 hp (670 kW) Electro-Motive Diesel 12-567A diesel engines; 1,800 shp (1,300 kW)
- Propulsion: 1 × Falk main reduction gears; 2 × Propellers
- Speed: 11.6 kn (21.5 km/h; 13.3 mph)
- Boats & landing craft carried: 2 x LCVPs
- Complement: 41 officers, 245 enlisted men
- Armament: 2 × quad 40 mm (1.57 in) Bofors guns; 8 × single 20 mm (0.79 in) Oerlikon cannons

USS Callisto (AGP-15) was a Portunus-class motor torpedo boat tender built for the United States Navy during World War II. It was originally ordered as USS LST-966 an LST-542-class tank landing ship, but renamed and re-designated in August 1944.

== Construction ==
Callisto was laid down 31 October 1944, at Hingham, Massachusetts, by the Bethlehem-Hingham Shipyard; launched 29 November; and commissioned 22 December 1944 for transit to its fitting out yard. Recommissioned 12 June 1945, after conversion to a Motor Torpedo Boat Tender (AGP).

== Service history ==
After brief service for the US Navy, it was decommissioned 9 May 1946, and laid up in the Pacific Reserve Fleet. Callisto was transferred to the Maritime Commission (MARCOM) 14 May 1948, and laid up in the National Defense Reserve Fleet. It was later sold for merchant service and renamed Elena then Daytona before being lost by unknown causes on 20 November 1955.

Callisto sailed from Yorktown, Virginia, on 23 July 1945, bound for the Pacific and service with the 7th Fleet. Delayed at Pearl Harbor, by the cessation of hostilities, it reported at San Pedro Bay, Philippines, on 15 October, to serve as tender to Motor Torpedo Boat Squadron 9, busy with the varied tasks given these speedy craft as normal life was restored to the Philippines. Callisto provided berthing, maintenance, and supply facilities for its assigned squadron until 20 December, when it cleared for San Francisco.

== Bibliography ==
Online resources

- "Callisto". Dictionary of American Naval Fighting Ships. Naval History and Heritage Command. This article incorporates text from this source, which is in the public domain.
- "Bethlehem-Hingham, Hingham MA". www.ShipbuildingHistory.com. 11 August 2011.
- "USS Callisto (AGP-15)". NavSource. 24 March 2017.
