= Macko =

Macko is a surname. Notable people with the surname include:

- Adam Macko (born 2000), Slovak-Canadian baseball player
- Joe Macko (1928–2014), American baseball player and manager
- Steve Macko (1954–1981), American baseball player, son of Joe
- Viliam Macko (born 1981), Slovak footballer

== See also ==
- Mack (surname)
