= Veris Residential =

American real estate investment trust

- Type: Private
- Industry: Real estate investment trust
- Founded: 1997; 29 years ago
- Headquarters: Jersey City, New Jersey, U.S.
- Area served: New Jersey; New York; Massachusetts; Washington, D.C.
- Key people: Mahbod Nia, (CEO); Amanda Lombard, CFO
- Services: Property management
- Owner: Affinius Capital and Vista Hill Partners
- Website: verisresidential.com

Veris Residential, Inc., headquartered in Jersey City, New Jersey, invests primarily in apartments in New Jersey and Boston. It owns 22 apartment complexes, three parking/retail properties and land held for development, containing 7,681 apartment units and approximately 56,000 square feet of retail. The company's properties are in New Jersey, New York, Massachusetts, and Washington, D.C. Notable properties owned by the company include The BLVD Collection, Sable, and Haus25. The company is owned by Affinius Capital and Vista Hill Partners.

== History ==
The company was founded in 1949 as Cali Associates by John J. Cali, Angelo R. Cali, and Edward Leshowitz.

In the 1950s, Cali Associates was a developer of single family homes in northern New Jersey. In 1969, the company completed construction of its first office building, 14 Commerce Drive, in Cranford Business Park, Cranford, New Jersey. During the 1970s and 1980s, Cali Associates capitalized on increasing population and commerce in New Jersey by building 2.2 million square feet of class A office space.

In August 1994, Cali Associates became a public company through an initial public offering, and it changed its name to Cali Realty Corporation, under a management headed by Brant Cali, John R. Cali, and Thomas A. Rizk.

In 1997, Cali Realty acquired the Robert Martin Company for $211 million in cash and 1,401,225 operating-partnership units, then valued at $44 million, and the assumption of $185 million of debt. The transaction added 65 properties and 4.1 million square feet to its portfolio, mostly in Westchester County, New York, and Connecticut. In 2019, Robert Martin re-acquired most of the portfolio from Mack-Cali for $487.5 million.

In December 1997, Cali Realty Corporation completed a $1.2 billion merger with Patriot American Office Group and the Mack Company (founded by H. Bert Mack and operated by his four sons: Earle I. Mack, William L. Mack, Fredric H. Mack, and David S. Mack). The company changed its named to Mack-Cali Realty Corporation. At the time, this merger was the largest real estate investment trust transaction.

Mitchell E. Hersh became the chief executive officer (CEO) in 1999. In 2004, he became president of the company in addition to its CEO.

In 1998, the company acquired $450 million worth of office properties, which boosted its holdings by 12%. It also bought properties in Washington, D.C. and Maryland and properties in the Southwest.

In 2000, the company agreed to acquire Prentiss Properties for $976 million in stock, or $2.2 billion including assumed debt, but terminated the deal after failing to get investor approval, paying a $25 million termination fee.

In 2006, the company acquired the Gale Company, a private real estate firm headquartered in New Jersey that owned 2.8 million-square-foot of office buildings.

In 2012, the company acquired Roseland Partners, a property developer in New Jersey, for $134.6 million. It was developing the $120 million RiverTrace waterfront tower at Port Imperial, which was completed in October 2013.

In 2013, the company sold 19 Skyline Drive for $17.5 million.

In November 2014, Roseland opened Portside at East Pier in East Boston. The second phase, which includes 550 luxury residences and 70,000 square feet of retail space, opened in 2018.

In June 2015, Mitchell E. Rudin became CEO and Michael J. DeMarco became the company's president and chief operating officer.

In September 2015, the company moved its headquarters to Jersey City.

In June 2020, MaryAnne Gilmartin was named chairperson.

In March 2021, Mahbod Nia was named CEO of the company.

In December 2021, the company changed its name to Veris Residential, Inc, reflecting a pivot from office to multifamily residential buildings.

In October 2022, Kushner Companies offered to acquire the company for $4.3 billion. However, the offer was rejected.

In April 2023, the company sold Harborside 1, 2, & 3 in Jersey City for $420 million.

In February 2024, the company sold its final office property.

In May 2026, a private equity consortium led by Affinius Capital and Vista Hill Partners acquired the company for an enterprise value of $3.4 billion.
