= Chris Mack =

Chris Mack may refer to:

- Chris Mack (basketball) (born 1969), American college basketball coach
- Chris Mack (cricketer) (born 1970), Australian cricketer
- Chris Mack (scientist) (born 1960), American scientist

== See also ==
- Mack (surname)
