= Bonnie McElveen-Hunter =

American diplomat

The Honorable Bonnie McElveen-Hunter Commander Grand Cross of the Order of the Lion
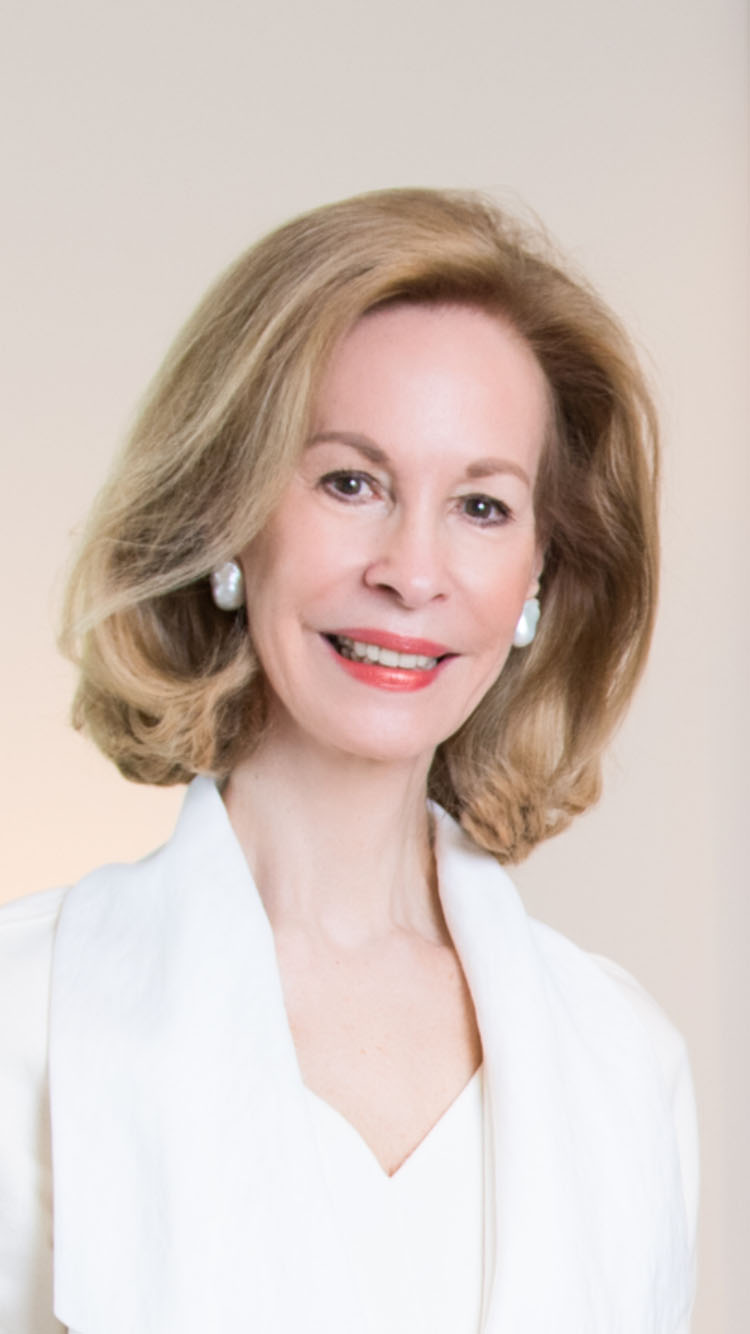

29th United States Ambassador to Finland
- In office November 5, 2001 – December 15, 2003
- Appointed by: George W. Bush
- Preceded by: Eric S. Edelman
- Succeeded by: Earle I. Mack

Personal details
- Born: Mary Bonnaeu McElveen; June 29, 1950 (age 76) Columbia, South Carolina, U.S.
- Party: Republican
- Spouse: Bynum Merritt Hunter (m 1980; d 2018)
- Children: Bynum Merritt Hunter II Mary Parker Hunter Shirley Hunter
- Education: Bellevue High School
- Alma mater: Stephens College
- Occupation: businesswoman, diplomat, philanthropist
- Known for: U.S. Ambassador to Finland; Chair of the American Red Cross; Founder & CEO of Pace Communications
- Awards: Commander Grand Cross of the Order of the Lion of Finland; Ellis Island Medal of Honor; North Carolina Award

Mary Bonneau "Bonnie" McElveen-Hunter (born June 29, 1950) is an American businesswoman, philanthropist, and diplomat who was the first female chair of the board of governors of the American Red Cross. She is the founder and CEO of Pace Communications, a content and integrated marketing agency, and was the U.S. Ambassador to Finland from 2001 to 2003. She served as the finance chairwoman of Elizabeth Dole's campaign for the Republican nomination for U.S. president. She also started the first billion dollar women's leadership campaign in America for the United Way.

== Early life ==
McElveen-Hunter's father was a lieutenant colonel in the U.S. Air Force and a P-51 pilot during World War II. Her mother was a school teacher. Her father joined the Air National Guard and was activated during the Korean War. He was one of the original seven U2 pilots who flew over the Soviet Union during the Cold War. When she was 18 months old, her family moved to Germany. They continued to move throughout her childhood to Washington, Texas, Oklahoma, Louisiana, California, and Nebraska. She is the older sister of Dr. John Thomas McElveen Jr. (neurotologist) and Tweed McElveen-Bogache.

She graduated in 1968 from Bellevue High School in Nebraska. She attended Stephens College in Columbia, Missouri where she started to study fashion design but later switched to business law and marketing. In 1970 she won the Miss Nebraska USA title and competed at Miss USA, a competition her sister also competed in as Miss Missouri USA in 1974. After graduating she moved to Charlotte, North Carolina and worked for Bank of America where she was the first woman in their executive training program. She then worked for Community Publishing, as an advertising executive for Charlotte Magazine. In 1972 she moved to Greensboro, North Carolina to work for Republican congressman Walter E. Johnston, III and started Pace Magazine, which later became Pace Communications . Pace was ranked by Working Woman Magazine as one of the top 175 women-owned businesses in America.

== Career ==
McElveen-Hunter founded Pace Communications, Inc. in 1973 and serves as the current chief executive officer and owner. She currently also serves as the chairwoman of the board of the American Red Cross and as a member of the board of trustees at the National Museum of Women in the Arts. She has also served as a trustee of the RAND Corporation and is a founder of the United Way Billion Dollar National Women's Leadership Initiative. In 2003 she initiated Stop Child Trafficking: End Modern-Day Slavery and Children of Karelia. She served as chairperson of the Alexis de Tocqueville Society and served on the United Way of America board as a member of its national leadership council. She was also a member of the international board of directors of Habitat for Humanity. She served as co-chairwoman of the annual national meeting of the Young Presidents' Organization in Santa Fe, New Mexico. She has also served on the University of North Carolina at Greensboro Advisory Board, the Greensboro Development Corporation, the Renaissance Campaign of the United Arts Council, and the board of First Union National Bank. McElveen-Hunter has also served on the boards for iCivics, The Collectors Committee of the National Gallery of Art, the Washington National Opera, Blair House, Macedonian Ministry, Inc., National Portrait Gallery, Max Planck Florida Institute, and on the executive committee of The Society of the Four Arts in Palm Beach.

McElveen-Hunter was appointed as the U.S. ambassador to Finland by President George W. Bush, a position she held from 2001 to 2004. As the United States Ambassador to Finland, McElveen-Hunter organized the Helsinki Women Business Leaders Summit, where female CEOs from the United States, Baltic region, and Russia created a business model to be replicated in other parts of the world. In 2004 she hosted a second Summit in Riga, Latvia and a third Summit in 2007 in Amman, Jordan with Queen Rania for women from Iraq, Palestine, Syria, and other Middle Eastern countries. Tarja Halonen, the President of Finland, awarded her with the honor of Commander Grand Cross of the Order of the Lion.

In 2004, McElveen-Hunter was appointed the first female chairperson of the American Red Cross. As chairperson, she has led the American Red Cross through the 2004 Indian Ocean earthquake and tsunami, Hurricane Katrina, the 2010 Haiti earthquake, and Hurricane Sandy. She has also since served on the boards of the John F. Kennedy Center for the Performing Arts, and the North Carolina Museum of Art. She also serves on the leadership council for ServiceNation. In 2013, McElveen-Hunter served as the Honorary Chairman of the 74th annual Wyndham Championship. She is on the National Advisory Board for High Point University and Elon University School of Law and has been a guest lecturer at Wake Forest University School of Business. She is a Lifetime Member of the Association and Junior Leagues International, Inc., a Lifetime Member of Hadassah, and a current member of Chief Executives Organization. She has given many commencement addresses in her career, including the 1988 University of North Carolina at Greensboro address, 2008 Pepperdine University, Graziadio School of Business and Management, 2010 Coastal Carolina University, and 2012 North Carolina State University address.

Bonnie McElveen-Hunter joined the National Board of Advisors at High Point University in 2014.

=== Awards ===
- Commander Grand Cross of the Order of the Lion of Finland
- United Way's 2004 National Alexis de Tocqueville Society Award
- Ellis Island Medal of Honor (2005)

== Personal life ==
In 1980, McElveen married Bynum Merritt Hunter (1925–2018), an attorney. Together they had three children. She owns homes in Irving Park Historic District, Greensboro; Palm Beach; and Washington, DC. She is a member of First Presbyterian Church of Greensboro and The Royal Poinciana Chapel in Palm Beach.

Diplomatic posts
Preceded by Eric S. Edelman	United States Ambassador to Finland; 2001–2003	Succeeded by Earle I. Mack
