= MaryAnne Gilmartin =

American businesswoman (1964– )

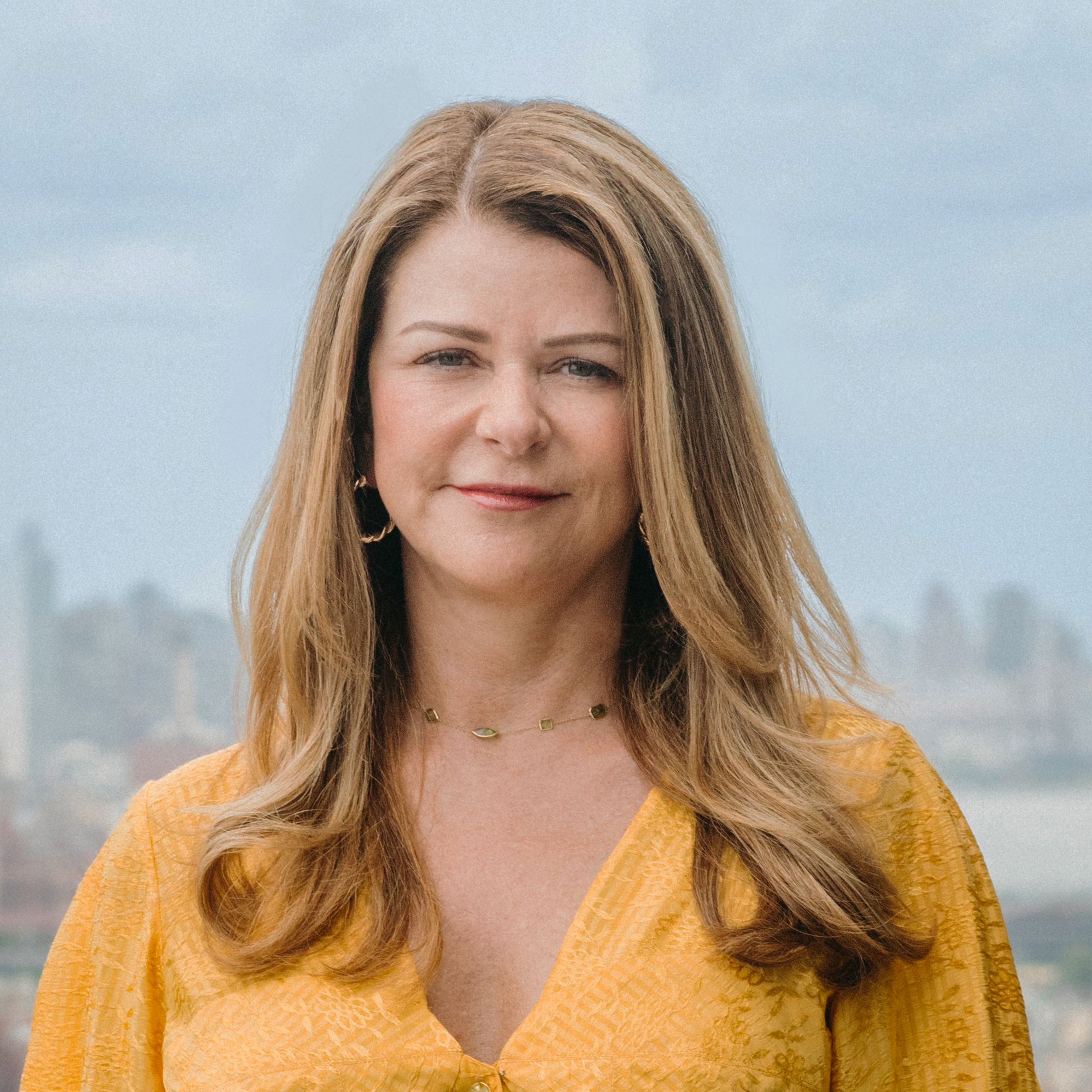
- Born: 1964 (age 60–61); New York
- Education: B.A., M.A., Fordham University
- Occupation(s): Real estate developer, founder and CEO, MAG Partners

MaryAnne Gilmartin is a real estate developer and founder and CEO of MAG Partners, a New York-based, women-owned real estate firm. She was formerly President and CEO of Forest City Ratner.

== Early life and education ==
Gilmartin was born in Rockaway Beach in Queens. Her biological father left the family when she was two. The family struggled financially, with her mother working several jobs. Her mother remarried and the family relocated to Woodstock, NY.

Gilmartin attended Catholic high school, graduated near the top of her class, and received a large aid package to Fordham University, where she completed her BA and MA. Gilmartin put herself through college through a work-study program and waiting tables at night. Elected to Phi Beta Kappa, she graduated summa cum laude in 1986.

== Career ==
Gilmartin won a New York City Urban Fellowship after graduating from Fordham, and she worked for the Economic Development Corporation (previously New York City's Public Development Corp.) as part of Ed Koch's administration. The role exposed her to the concept of large-scale urban development for the benefit of both the economy and the general public.

Gilmartin began working at Forest City Ratner in 1994, serving as president and then as CEO for Bruce Ratner in 2013. There she developed Barclays Center, Pacific Park, Brooklyn, The New York Times Building, 8 Spruce Street (formerly "New York by Gehry"), the Tata Innovation Center at Cornell Tech, and the 42nd Street retail complex (including Madame Tussauds New York).

In 2014, Gilmartin and Ratner were awarded the Municipal Art Society (MAS) Jacqueline Kennedy Onassis Medal. While the Historic Districts Council and other preservationists marked this as controversial, the MAS defended their choice based on Ratner and Gilmartin's focus on creating affordable housing, innovative modular building techniques, and commitment to New York's future.

In 2018, Gilmartin left Forest City Ratner to create L&L MAG. In July 2020, she split with L&L to form the New York-based, women-owned urban real estate company MAG Partners, where she serves as founder and CEO. The firm's first project in NYC was co-developing Ruby in Chelsea, Manhattan. MAG Partners also began developing Baltimore Peninsula (formerly Port Covington) in May 2022.

Gilmartin is a board member of Jefferies Group and served as chair of the board of directors and interim CEO of Mack-Cali Realty Corporation from 2020-2021.

== Personal life ==
Gilmartin married James Gilmartin, a retired detective and attorney. They have three children. They divorced in 2017.

== Awards, honors ==
- 2003 – Crain's 40 Under 40
- 2007 – One of Crain's "100 Most Powerful Women in New York"
- 2014 – Municipal Art Society, Jacqueline Kennedy Onassis Medal
- 2016 – Cornell University and the Baker Program in Real Estate, Real Estate Industry Leader Award
- 2017 – Real Estate Board of New York (REBNY), Bernard H. Mendik Lifetime Leadership Real Estate Award
