= Tercio, Colorado =

Ghost town in Colorado, United States

Coordinates: 37°03′07″N 104°59′48″W

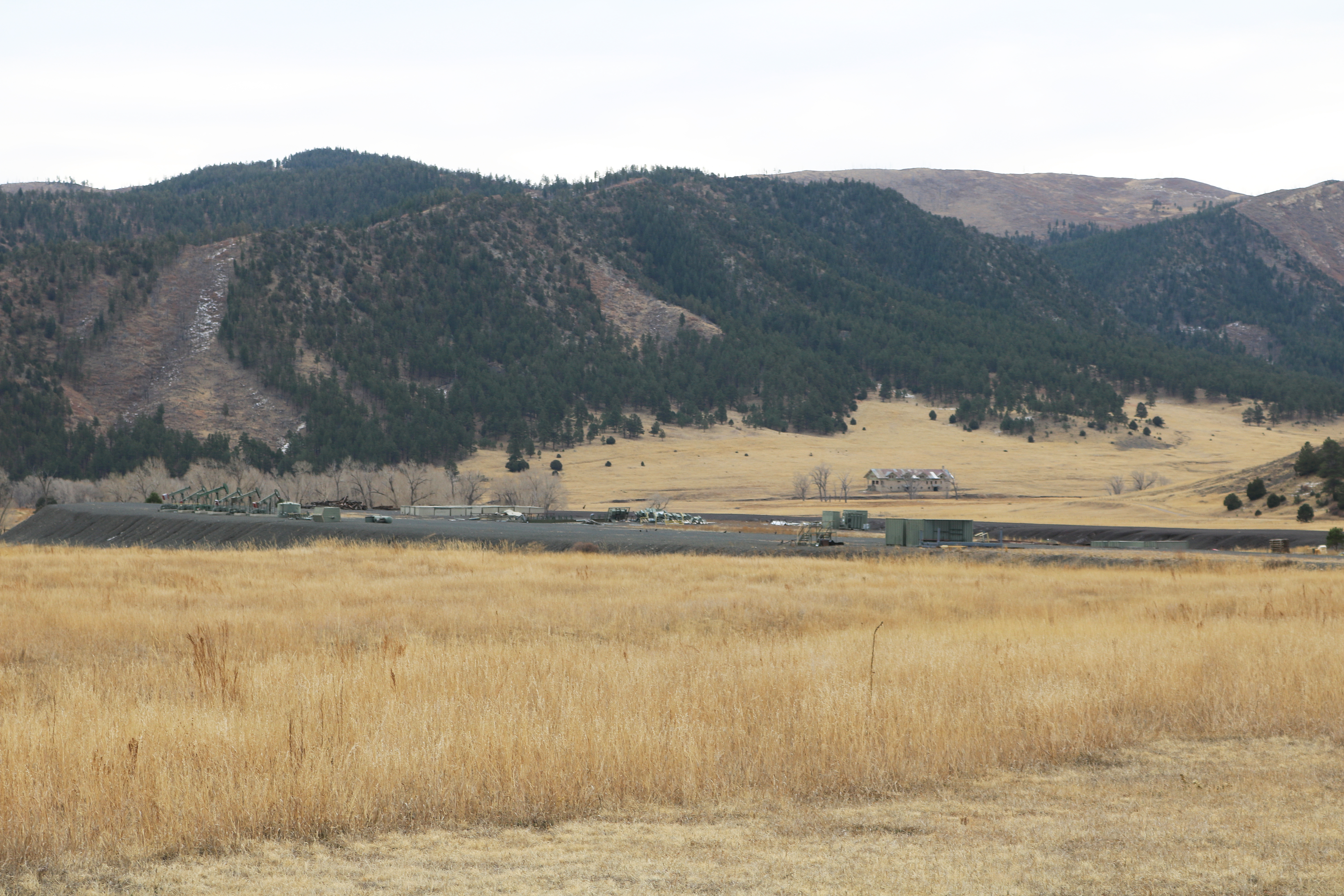
A view of Tercio from Las Animas County Road 13. A coal slag pile is in the center. The large building in the distance is the former Colorado Supply Company Store.

Tercio is a ghost town and former coal mine in Las Animas County, in the U.S. state of Colorado. The GNIS classifies it as a populated place. A post office called Tercio was established in 1902, and remained in operation until 1949. The community was the third (Spanish: tercio) coal mining community established by the Colorado Fuel and Iron Company, hence the name.

== Geography ==
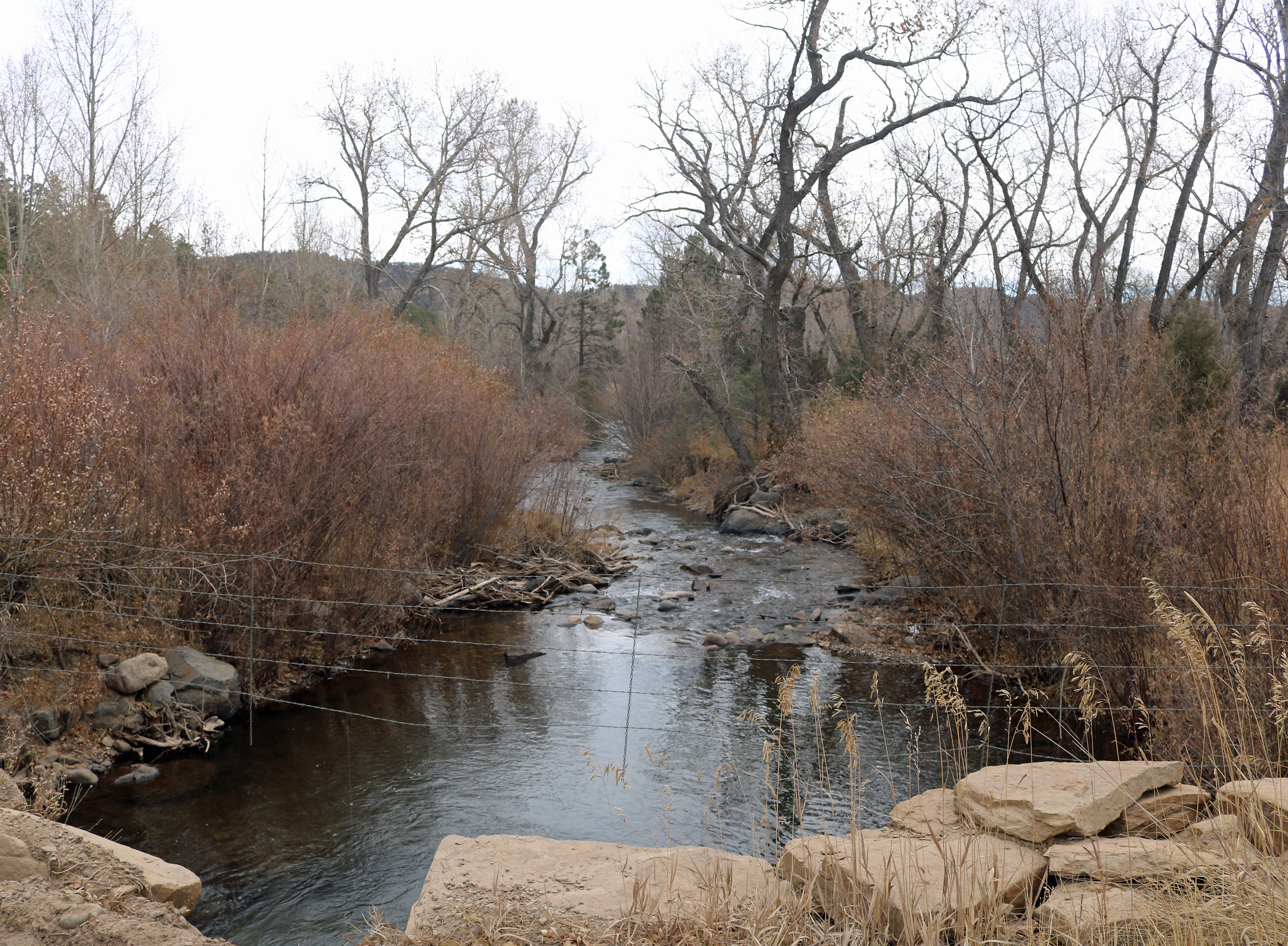
The South Fork of the Purgatoire River near Tercio.

Tercio consists of an abandoned coal mine and the meager remains of a company town near the headwaters of the South Fork of the Purgatoire River about 5 km (3.1 miles) from the border with New Mexico. The mine and settlement are in the foothills of the Culebra Range of the Sangre de Cristo Mountains at an elevation of 2,358 m (7,736 ft). Tercio is in the Raton Basin and was one of many coal-mining communities created in the Basin during the late 19th and early 20th century. An author said, "Of all the coal mining camps scattered throughout southern Colorado, Tercio probably had the most picturesque location. On three sides the site is cradled by low lying, thickly-wooded hills...[To the west] the Sangre de Cristos push skyward in misty rows of cracked escarpments."

== History ==
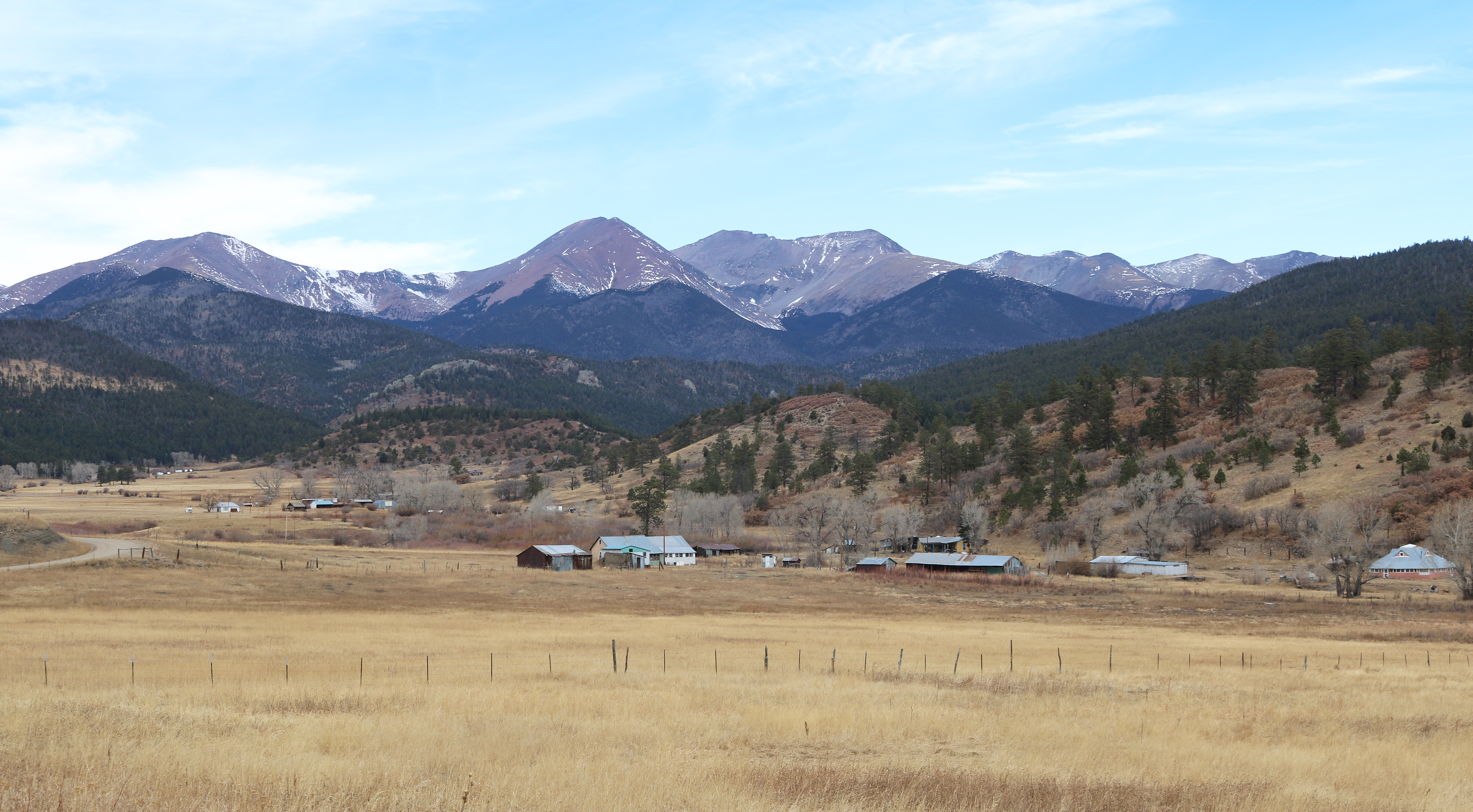
Torres, two miles from Tercio, and the Culebra Range.

Prior to the arrival of the coal miners, the valley of the South Fork of the Purgatoire River was sparsely inhabited by Hispanics in settlements known as Torres and Rincon. The Colorado Fuel and Iron company established Tercio in 1901 and in 1902 the Tercio mine produced its first coal. The Colorado Supply Company Store opened on 3 December 1901. The Colorado and Wyoming Railway company extended its line to Tercio in 1902. Coal mined near Tercio was used mostly to produce coke which was transported by rail to Pueblo, Colorado to be used in the Colorado Fuel and Iron steel mill.

By August 1902 Tercio was a company town with 100 houses for employees and expanding rapidly. By 1910 the Tercio coal industry employed 1,000 men and the town itself had a population of 300 families. In 1913, however, the coking operation began to decline. The mine closed in 1915, but coking continued until 1918. The company store continued in operation until 1949. The large building housing the store is the only major structure in Tercio still existing in the 21st century.

Two additional coal mines were located near Tercio: Cuatro (Spanish "four"), 3 km (1.9 miles) west and Cornell, 3 km (1.9 miles) northwest. Cuatro operated from 1902 to 1907. Cornell operated from 1908 to 1911. The production of the three mines during their lifetimes was: Tercio, 1,533,463 tons; Cuatro, 273,855 tons; and Cornell, 509 tons.

Mining disasters. On 28 October 1904, 19 men were killed by an explosion of coal dust in the Tercio mine. Press reports said that only two of the 19 killed were Anglo Americans and the others were "Slavs and Mexicans." The workers at Tercio and other mines in southern Colorado were mostly foreign-born, especially from southern and eastern Europe, and lumped together as "Slavs." On 22 April 1906 a gas explosion at the Cuatro Mine also killed 19 workers.

Conservation. In 2013, businessman Louis Bacon announced the establishment of a perpetual conservation easement of 21,000 acres (85 km^{2}) of land on the Tercio and Red River ranches owned by Bacon.

== Notable person ==
- Agnes Smedley, a journalist, feminist, and supporter of the Communist revolution in China, attended school in Tercio in 1908. Finishing 8th grade in Tercio, Smedley passed an examination to become a school teacher at age 17.

== See also ==
- Primero, Colorado, the first Spanish numerically named city established by Colorado Fuel & Iron
- Segundo, Colorado, the second Spanish numerically named city established by Colorado Fuel & Iron
