= Eric Mack =

American philosopher (born 1946)

- Born: 1946 (age 79–80)

Education
- Education: University of Rochester (PhD), Union College (BA)

Philosophical work
- Era: 21st-century philosophy
- Region: Western philosophy
- Institutions: Tulane University
- Main interests: political philosophy

Eric Mack (born 1946) is an American philosopher and professor emeritus of Philosophy at Tulane University. He is known for his works on political philosophy.

== Books and articles ==
- Libertarianism, Polity Press 2018
- John Locke, Bloomsbury Academic 2013
- Mack, Eric (2018). "Part II: Questioning Libertarianism Principles; Ch. 10: Self-Love, Social Cooperation, and Justice". In Brennan, Jason; van der Vossen, Bas; Schmidtz, David (eds.). The Routledge Handbook of Libertarianism. London and New York: Taylor & Francis Group. pp. 140–154. ISBN 978-0367870591.
