= Joe Mack =

Joe or Joseph Mack may refer to:

- Joe Mack (first baseman) (1912–1998), American baseball first baseman
- Joe Mack (catcher) (born 2002), American baseball player
- Joe Mack (Canadian football) (born 1954), former general manager and vice-president of football operations for the Winnipeg Blue Bombers
- Joe Mack (unionist) (1867–1951), New Zealand railway worker and trade unionist
- Joseph Mack (politician) (1919–2005), member of the Michigan Senate

== See also ==
- Reddy Mack (Joseph McNamara, 1866–1916), Irish-born American baseball player
