= Kevin Mack (disambiguation) =

Kevin Mack is an American football player.

Kevin Mack may also refer to:

- Kevin Mack (visual effects artist) (born 1959), also known as Kevin Scott Mack
- Kevin Mack of Toquaht First Nation
- Kevin Mack, current mayor of Albury
