= H. Bert Mack =

Real estate developer

Hyman Bert Mack
- Born: Hyman Bert Makofsky; August 1, 1909
- Died: May 8, 1992 (aged 82); Palm Beach, Florida, U.S.
- Known for: founder of the Mack Company
- Spouse: Ruth Kaufman
- Children: 4, including Earle I. Mack and David S. Mack

Hyman Bert Mack (né Makofsky; August 1, 1909 – May 8, 1992) was an American real estate developer, founder of the Mack Company, and patriarch of the Mack family.

== Biography ==
H. Bert Mack founded the Mack Company, serving as chairman of the board until his death in 1992. In the 1960s, he bought thousands of acres of undeveloped land in the New Jersey Meadowlands and built warehouses and office buildings on it.

In April 1989, the Mack family purchased the Texas Rangers in a syndicated deal with Frank L. Morsani from oil tycoon Eddie Chiles for $89 million. The investment group was headed by George W. Bush, who had a $600,000 investment in the purchase.

In 1997, Mack's sons merged the Mack Company with the Cali Realty Corporation (co-founded by Edward Leshowitz and brothers John J. Cali and Angelo R. Cali) creating Mack-Cali Realty Corporation, the largest office-property owner in New Jersey. Mack's sons (David, Earle, William, and Fredric) all became directors of the new entity.

== Philanthropy ==
Mack was an active philanthropist dedicated to Jewish causes. He was a former member of the board of directors of the Jewish Theological Seminary of America; a founder, board member, and trustee of the Hillcrest Jewish Center in Queens County; and a donor to the Jewish Federation/United Jewish Appeal in Palm Beach, Florida. He was a founder of Yeshiva University's Albert Einstein College of Medicine, in the Bronx. He was also a benefactor of the Long Island Jewish Medical Center, in New Hyde Park, New York, and St. Mary's Hospital in West Palm Beach.

Mack was a member of the New York Statue of Liberty Centennial Commission and was on the board of the New York State Commission to Commemorate the 200th Anniversary of the American Revolution.

== Personal life ==
He was married to Ruth Kaufman. They had four sons: Earle I. Mack, William L. Mack, Fredric H. Mack, and David S. Mack. Mack and his wife lived in Palm Beach, Florida and Jamaica Estates, Queens. Mack died of lymphoma in 1992 at his home in Palm Beach, Florida.
