= Port Covington =

Neighborhood of Baltimore, Maryland

Port Covington Baltimore Peninsula
- Neighborhood of Baltimore
- Nickname: Billion Dollar Ghost Town
- Interactive map of Port Covington
- Coordinates: 39°15′33.889″N 76°36′23.644″W
- Country: United States
- State: Maryland
- City: Baltimore

Area
  - Total: 235 acres (95 ha)
- Time zone: UTC-5 (Eastern)
  - Summer (DST): EDT
- ZIP Code: 21230
- Area code: 410, 443, and 667
- Website: Official Website

Historically known as Port Covington, and named after Marylander General Leonard Covington, has been rebranded as Baltimore Peninsula with redevelopment efforts in the 21st century, it is a neighborhood in south Baltimore, Maryland containing 2.5 miles of shoreline. Several 2025 articles have referred to the Baltimore Peninsula project as the "Billion Dollar Ghost Town". It's surrounded by some of Baltimore's most vibrant, culturally rich neighborhoods: Federal Hill, Riverside, Locust Point and Pigtown but the development has no interchange on I-95 and to access those enclaves requires a frontage road to cross the interstate, railroad tracks and other impediments.

== History ==
The marshy site south of downtown Baltimore was part of the 1814 Battle of Baltimore. Two almost forgotten fortifications were located there, just west of the famous Fort McHenry: Fort Babcock and Fort Covington.

Less than a decade after the War of 1812 ended, both forts were deserted; Fort Covington was demolished in 1837. There has never been a historic marker, but The Baltimore Sun reported that when the Western Maryland Railway acquired property for a shipping terminal in 1904, they named the area "Port Covington" to honor the fort.

Interstate 95 was constructed over the site of Fort Babcock. The National Star-Spangled Banner Centennial Commission erected a Fort Babcock memorial in 1914 at the Gould Street Power Plant. The cannon and commemorative plaque on a granite block were removed prior to the early 2021 power plant demolition. The Society of the War of 1812 in Maryland now has possession of the Fort Babcock memorial and the cannon is being restored. The Society is discussing options with the developer.

Port Covington was considered in the mid-1980s as a location for the Baltimore Orioles stadium prior to construction of Oriole Park at Camden Yards.

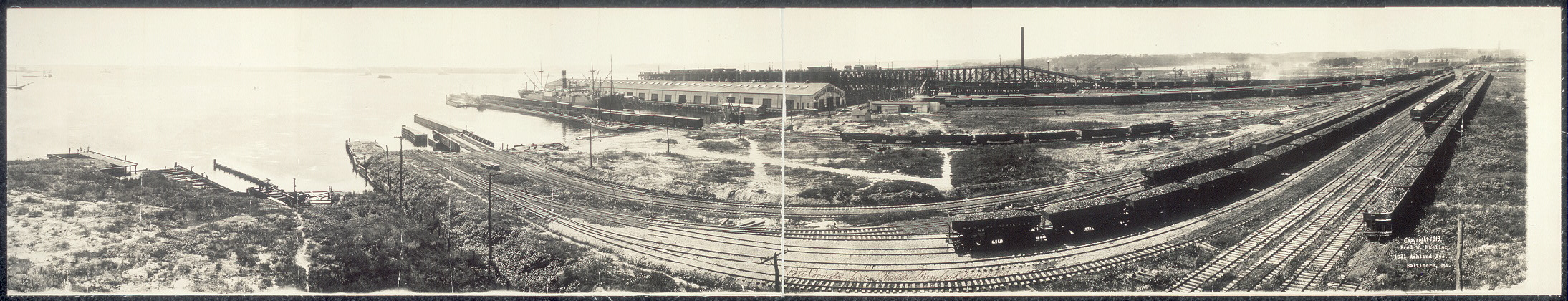
Port Covington Yards, Western Maryland Railroad c. 1913

=== Ship terminal ===
For much of the 20th century, Port Covington was a railroad terminal built by the Western Maryland Railway in 1904 on the Middle Branch of the Patapsco River. The terminal facilities included coal, grain and merchandise piers, overhead cranes, 11 rail yards, warehouses, a roundhouse, a turntable and a machine shop. Coal from Pennsylvania was loaded in the 1920s rotary dumpers for coal and coke were installed, and a large grain elevator. Port operations ended in the 1970s and the docks were abandoned in 1988.

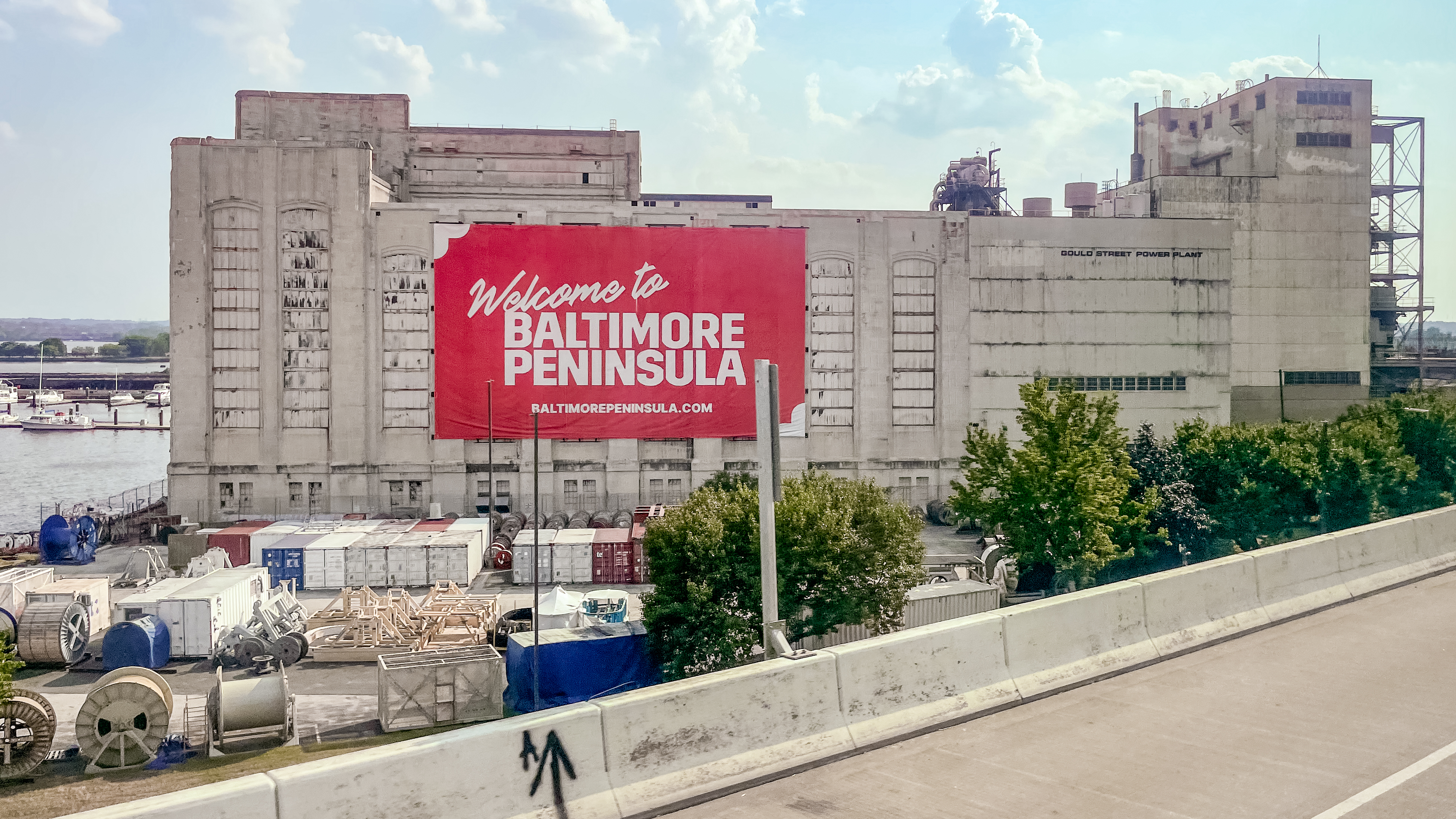
Gould Street Generating Station

=== Power plant ===
The Baltimore Brick Company purchased several competing businesses in 1899. Included in the acquisition was a 6.4-acre waterfront property in south Baltimore. The Great Baltimore Fire raged on February 7th and 8th, 1904 when 1,500 buildings were destroyed and another 1,000 damaged severely. After the fire, the tract was sold for $45,000 to the Maryland Telephone and Telegraph Company who constructed the Gould Street Generating Station (GSGS) to offer electricity to their customers. At the time, the company was the largest provider of phone service in Baltimore with 9,000 customers. The GSGS cost an estimated $2 million to build and was touted as "thoroughly modern and fireproof", constructed of steel and concrete with exterior brick walls. The boilers and steam turbines were made by Westinghouse and the location had access to coal from railcars or ships. When production began in 1905, capacity was 8,000 horsepower. Chief competitor was Consolidated Gas Electric Light and Power Company who constructed the Westport Generating Station that same year. In 1906, Consolidated acquired all of Baltimore's competing electric companies and in 1908, all the other Baltimore generating stations were shut down. Westport's output of 252 megawatts was sufficient for the entire city; however, the Gould Street station became a backup during peak periods of demand.

A new building was constructed on the site in 1927 to contain three generating units. Units 1 and 2 were steam-powered 35 megawatt generators. A boiler which burned pulverized coal created 450 psi steam for the turbines that was superheated to 750 °F (399 °C). These two generators operated until they were decommissioned in 1977.

Unit 3, which generated 100 megawatts, was installed in 1952. It was initially powered by a turbine using steam from the coal-fired boiler, but was converted to No. 6 fuel oil. A 2003 failure caused a shutdown; it was repaired and changed to natural gas before reactivation in June 2008. Constellation Energy merged into Exelon in 2012, who shuttered and sold the plant in 2019. The site was purchased by Greenspring Realty Partners, Inc. for $3.1 million in December 2019.

In late 2019, Greenspring Realty Partners purchased the Gould Street property for $3.25 million from Exelon. Demolition of the 1905 building started in October 2020.

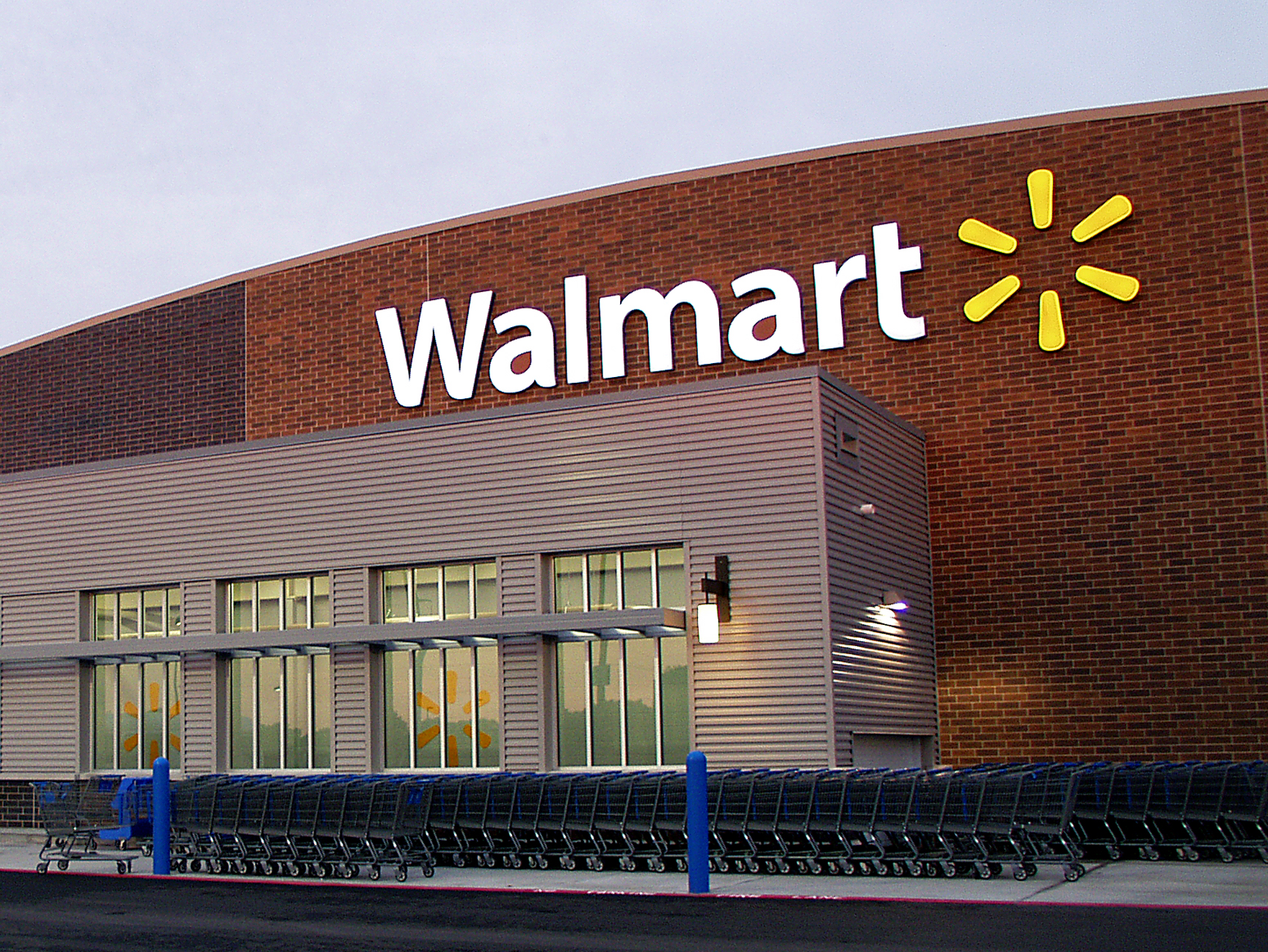

=== Y2K ===
Baltimore Development Corporation sold a 45-acre plot in 2000 to Starwood Certuzzi of Connecticut, who planned a $50 million box store development intended for a Walmart/Sam's Club, Home Depot, Ruby Tuesdays, Staples and several restaurants. A waterfront section was reserved for a casino and a cruise ship terminal. However, large signage and an interchange on I-95 were rejected by the city. Interstate 95 serves Port Covington through Exits 54 (Hanover Street) and 55 (Key Highway); through this area, McComas Street serves as a frontage road between the two exits and continues east into the Locust Point neighborhood. Construction of Walmart and Sam's Club was complete in 2002, but their presence attracted no other businesses. Sam's Club closed in 2007 with Walmart following suit in January 2016. Other businesses in the area left and things fell apart. Three Baltimore developers proposed a major project for Port Covington in 2008 offering hope, but the following year one of them failed, killing the deal. The property was foreclosed and auctioned.

=== The Sun ===
In April 1988, at a cost of $180 million, The Baltimore Sun newspaper purchased 60 acres (24 ha) of land at Port Covington and built Sun Park. The new building housed a satellite printing and packaging facility, and also was the newspaper's headquarters for its distribution operations. On January 30, 2022, The Baltimore Sun newspaper was printed for the last time at its Sun Park facility. The Sun's printing operations were moved to a printing facility in Wilmington, Delaware. In December 2022, the Sun announced their return to downtown Baltimore, abandoning Sun Park altogether.

== Redevelopment ==
=== Sagamore ===
The current redevelopment project began with the purchase of the 60-acre Sun Park in 2014 by Sagamore Development, led by Kevin Plank, the founder of Under Armour, according to Weller Development Partners. This acquisition marked the beginning of a large-scale transformation of the former industrial port area into a mixed-use development. In January 2016, plans were unveiled which Plank predicted to become "Dubai on the Patapsco". The new plan for Port Covington calls for two proposed new light rail stations, along with new residential and commercial development. The first station would be located west of Hanover Street, and the other would be located at the intersection of East McComas Street and East Cromwell Street, just south of Federal Hill. This proposed extension would create a new spur from the Central Light Rail line by crossing the Middle Branch of the Patapsco River south of Interstate 95. Additional features of the proposed redevelopment include a new entertainment venue, new waterfront park areas, makerspace, as well as new offices for Under Armour and other industries owned by Plank.

Sagamore Development requested $1.1 billion in federal, state and municipal government financing, including $535 million in tax increment financing (TIF) from the City of Baltimore. The proposed TIF is the largest ever proposed in Baltimore and would be one of the largest TIFs in the country. MuniCap, a financial consulting firm, projected that the Port Covington properties owned by Sagamore would be worth $2,608,900,706 at full build-out.

Some local residents are concerned with the adverse environmental impact the project will have on an already unstable region. Other Baltimoreans are concerned that the economic impact of the development will only benefit a segment of the population, leaving behind the city's poorer, economically depressed communities. At an August 2016 city council work session to discuss the potential project, tempers brewed. A local clergy member and community organizer said, "The city really should not be in the business of subsidizing affluent enclaves, especially one year after the unrest." An attorney for Sagamore Development reportedly bristled, and later offered that the project, which would include "world class" kayak facilities, would be available to the black community as well: "I'm fairly sure that African-Americans kayak too." Another pastor and community activist shouted in response, "This is for rich white people! You want it, you pay for it yourself!"

Community groups have called for public financing to be linked to guarantees for a public profit-sharing agreement and financing for schools to cover potential loss of $315 million in funding over 40 years for Baltimore schools. Advocates have also called for more affordable housing as part of the development, and lowering the size of the proposed TIF to cover only required infrastructure development, not additional amenities such as kayak landings.

Construction officially began on the first phase of the development on May 13, 2019. Oversight is now provided by Mark Weller of Weller Development who was also a Sagamore Development partner. Goldman Sachs became a partner in 2017 with a $233 million investment.

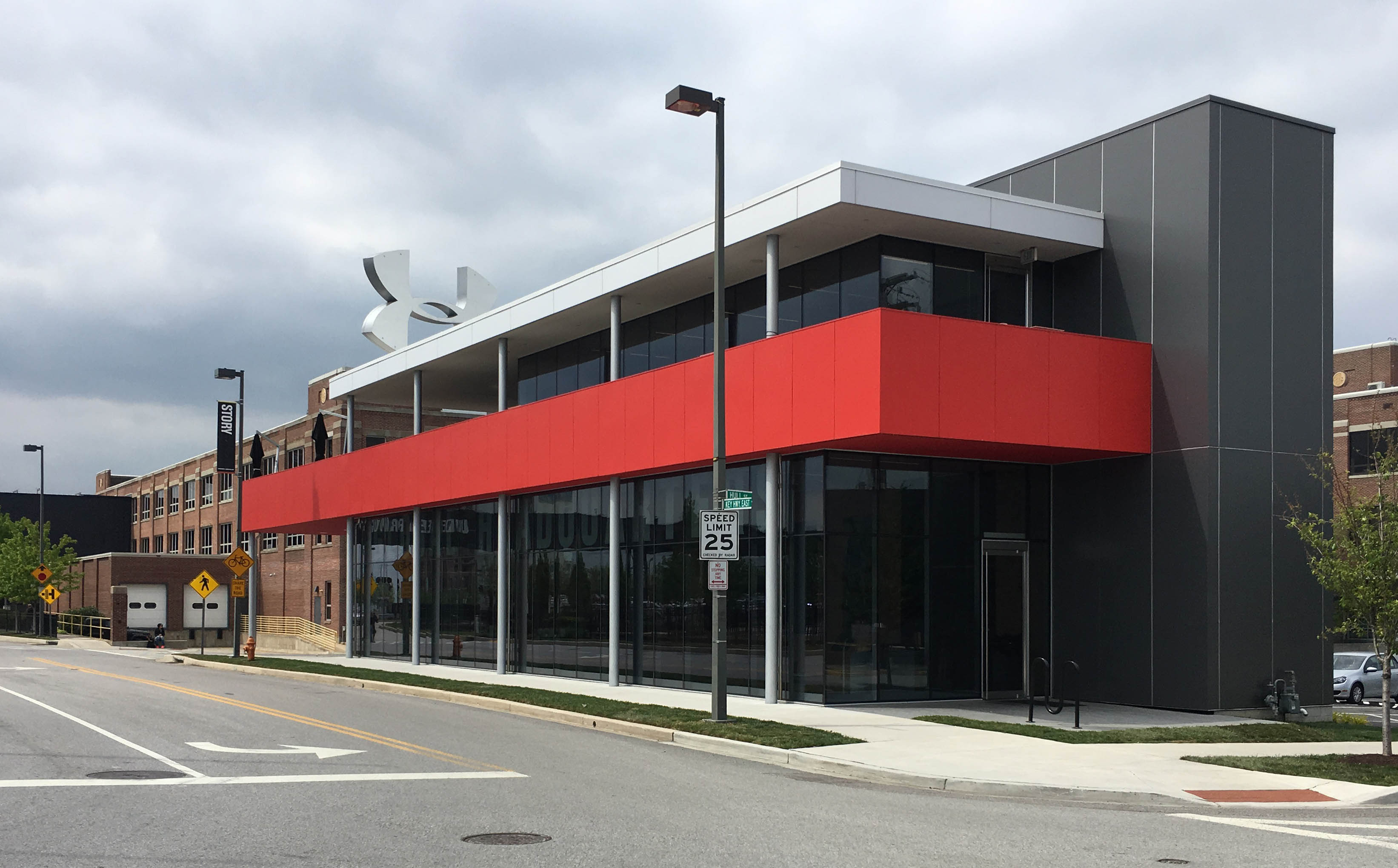
Under Armour headquarters

=== Under Armour ===
Under Armour, the original sponsor of the development and anchor tenant, suffered setbacks from the mid-2010s through the COVID-19 pandemic. Since much of their merchandise is manufactured abroad, their future is uncertain because of Trump's tariffs. Their originally planned corporate headquarters has been scaled back. As of 2025 Under Armour's campus includes a retail, office and fitness center in a 280,000 sq ft (26,000 m^{2}) building, a stadium, a 170,000 sq ft (16,000 m^{2}) building of offices in the former Sam's Club which closed in late 2007 and the former Walmart building, which was vacated in 2016.

=== Disappointments ===
- Baltimore Peninsula was proposed for Amazon's second headquarters, but their bid was declined.
- A 2018 article in Chesapeake Bay Magazine announced that three cyber-security companies were relocating and Port Covington would become a "leading cybersecurity and technology hub". In early 2019, the city suffered a ransomware attack that crippled government computers and forced the city to request federal assistance. The city's bad reputation may have been a factor when none of them chose Baltimore.
- A bio-tech center was planned but never materialized.

=== Challenges ===
- Despite new infrastructure and buildings, the area lacks the bustling atmosphere of a thriving neighborhood, with numerous real estate parcels and many retail spaces remaining vacant.
- Demand for office space has declined substantially since the original plans over ten years ago.
- The area has limited public transportation and reliance on cars.
- The original vision for Baltimore Peninsula was that of a separate city which has led to a sense of detachment from the rest of the city.

=== Initiatives ===
- A soccer complex is being considered by the Maryland Stadium Authority. The 13-acre site of the Baltimore Sun, demoed in 2023, would cost approximately $200 million for the stadium and a training facility. Potential funding was indeterminate.
- The new developers are considering several industrial businesses including data centers.
- Forty acres of park space are planned for the Baltimore Peninsula.

=== New developer begins ===
In late 2022, Port Covington was again rebranded Baltimore Peninsula by a new development team led by MAG Partners founder MaryAnne Gilmartin. and MacFarlane Partners.

=== Accomplishments ===
When questioned in 2025 about the YouTube video, "Baltimore's Billion Dollar Ghost Town" which had 1.6 million views, a representative for Baltimore Peninsula's PR firm responded that the film was shot in 2024 and much progress has occurred since then.

Baltimore Peninsula now has over 2,000 people employed and 500 families residing there. Residential buildings, Rye House and 250 Mission were at 95% capacity with 20% affordable housing; retail space exceeding 100,000 sq ft (9,300 m^{2}) would open by next year with nearly a third women/minority owned; new restaurants included Jersey Mike's Subs, Ben & Jerry's, Nick's Fish House and Slutty Vegan. The Nineteen O'Nine bar at the Sagamore Spirit distillery and Rye Street Tavern now has competition with Bar Vegan and Vessel (bar) at the Roost Hotel. Club Volo has hosted intramural leagues for pickleball, soccer and kickball with monthly special events. Elijah's Park opened in late 2023 and has been named after Maryland Congressman and civil rights leader Elijah Cummings. The 28,000 sq ft (2,600 m^{2}) green space has an oval lawn with native plants and trees, pavilions, and a playground. CFG Bank has corporate offices on House Street. Locke Landing is a residential development presently under construction that includes nearly 800 apartments, townhomes and condominiums on 25-acres.
