= William Mack =

William or Bill Mack may refer to:

- William Mack (Ontario politician) (1828–1897), Ontario businessman and political figure
- W.C. Mack (1818-1903), English organ builder
- William L. Mack (1924–2009), provincial level politician from Alberta, Canada
- William Mack (judge) (1904–1979), barrister and judge in Queensland, Australia
- William P. Mack (1915–2003), vice admiral in the United States Navy
- William B. Mack (1872–1955), American stage and film actor
- Bill Mack (songwriter) (1932–2020), American country music singer, songwriter, and radio host
- Bill Mack (sculptor) (born 1944), American sculptor and painter
- Bill Mack (baseball) (1885–1971), pitcher in Major League Baseball
- Bill Mack (runner), winner of the mile at the 1952 USA Indoor Track and Field Championships
- Red Mack (1937–2021), American football player
