= Torres, Colorado =

Unincorporated community in Las Animas County, Colorado, US

Coordinates: 37°04′10″N 105°03′22″W

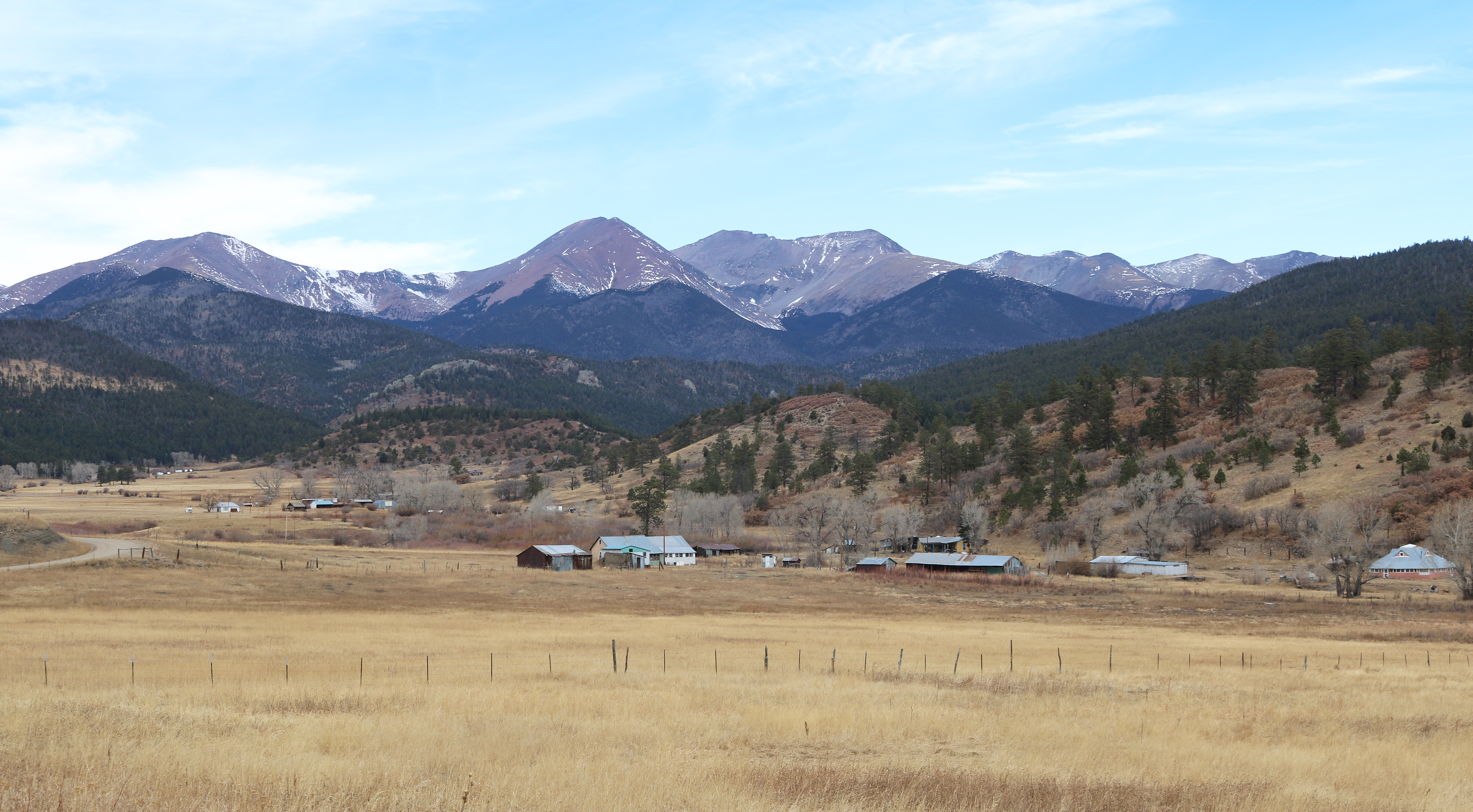
Some ranch buildings in Torres, with the Culebra Range in the back

Torres is an unincorporated community in Las Animas County, in the U.S. state of Colorado.

== History ==
A post office called Torres was established in 1894, and remained in operation until 1918. The community most likely was named for a nearby mine tower (Spanish: torres).
