= Earle I. Mack =

American businessman and diplomat

Earle Irving Mack
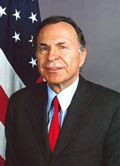

30th United States Ambassador to Finland
- In office May 25, 2004 – October 20, 2005
- Appointed by: George W. Bush
- Preceded by: Bonnie McElveen-Hunter
- Succeeded by: Marilyn Ware

Personal details
- Born: Irving Mack; July 11, 1936 (age 90) Brooklyn, New York, U.S.
- Spouse: Carol Dickey
- Children: 2
- Parent(s): Ruth Kaufman; H. Bert Mack
- Education: Drexel University (BS); Fordham University School of Law
- Occupation: Real estate developer Ambassador
- Known for: founding board member of Mack-Cali Realty Corporation

Earle Irving Mack (born July 11, 1936) is an American businessman and former United States Ambassador to Finland.

Mack was a senior partner of The Mack Company, a real estate development, investment, and management firm, and was a founding board member of the merged Mack-Cali Realty Corporation in 1997. He is active in the arts, serving as chairman and CEO of the New York State Council on the Arts for three years, and has produced a number of theatrical productions and films. Mack has been involved in Thoroughbred horse breeding and racing since 1963 as an owner and advocate. His political involvement includes a 2016 attempt to draft Paul Ryan as the GOP presidential candidate.

== Education ==
Mack was born to Jewish parents Ruth (née Kaufman) and H. Bert Mack. His father founded the real estate development company, the Mack Company. He has three brothers: William, Fredric, and David.

Mack graduated from Drexel University with a B.S. in 1959. He was a member of the Sigma Alpha Mu fraternity at Drexel. He then went on to attend Fordham School of Law. In 1992 Mack was one of the first 100 alumni inducted into the newly formed Drexel 100 alumni association. He has been awarded several honorary degrees, including Doctor's of Law from Fordham School of Law, an honorary degree in Doctor of Humane Letters (D.H.L.) from Daemen College, an honorary degree in Doctor of Humane Letters from Yeshiva University, Doctor of Business Administration, honoris causa from Drexel University in 2006, and recognized with an honorary degree for Doctor of Humane Letters from Franklin Pierce University in 2016. From 1992 to 2004, Mack served as Chairman of the Board of the Benjamin N. Cardozo School of Law, and was elected Chairman Emeritus in 2004. On May 1, 2008, the Drexel University College of Law was renamed the Earle Mack School of Law in light of his $15 million donation. In December 2013, a letter signed by Drexel University President John A. Fry and board of trustees Chairman Richard A. Greenawalt said Mack "graciously stepped aside as naming benefactor of Drexel’s law school." The school is now known as Drexel University Thomas R. Kline School of Law.

== Military service ==
Mack served his mandatory military service in the United States Army Infantry as a Second Lieutenant while on active duty (1959); and as a First Lieutenant, U.S. Army Infantry and Military Police, while serving on Reserve duty (1960–1968).

== Ambassadorship ==
Mack served as United States Ambassador Extraordinary and Plenipotentiary to Finland. He was chosen by President George W. Bush, and was sworn in May 2004. He served as U.S. Ambassador to Finland until November 2005.

== Business ==
Mack was senior partner of The Mack Company (1963–2004; 2006–Present). The Mack Company, established over a century ago, is a real estate development, investment, and management firm. The Mack Company merged their office portfolio with Cali Realty and the successor company became the Mack-Cali Realty Corporation in 1997. Mack was a founding board member of the merged Mack-Cali Realty Corporation (NYSE).

The Mack Company, currently headquartered in Fort Lee, New Jersey, invests, develops and manages income-producing property. Mack has also served on the Executive Committee of the National Realty Council. Among other business endeavors, he has written and published articles for the ABA Banking Journal and for the Mortgage and Real Estate Executives Report in the past.

== Arts ==
Mack is the past chairman and CEO of the New York State Council on the Arts (1996–1999). Upon retirement, Mack was elected Chairman Emeritus.

Mack is the producer of The Children of Theatre Street, a 90-minute feature documentary film nominated for an Academy Award by the Academy of Motion Picture Arts and Sciences, (1977); Cannes Film Festival, (1977) and winner of the National Film Advisory Board's Award of Excellence, (1978).

He also co-produced, with Joseph Papp and the New York Shakespeare Public Theater, the multi-media rock musical Stomp. (1970). He was a member of the board of directors, New York City Ballet (1987–1996; 1999–2004) and past co-chairman of the board of directors, Dance Theater of Harlem. He was co-producer of the films, Hard Choices and She Dances Alone. He has been a member of the board of trustees, American Friends of the Paris Opera and Ballet and had been a member of the executive committee of the National Association of the School of American Ballet.

== Public service ==
Mack was recognized by Governor George Pataki and received in 2000 the New York State Governors Arts Award for outstanding leadership in the arts. He was a Member of the Governor's Committee on Scholastic Achievement and was a Member of the Advisory Board, New York State Business Venture Partnership, and a past Board Member of the Appeal of Conscience.

President George W. Bush appointed him to serve on the Honorary Delegation to accompany him to Jerusalem for the celebration of the 60th anniversary of the State of Israel in May 2008. In 2012 Mack spoke out against the possibility of capping charitable tax deductions, appearing on CNN's Situation Room with Lisa Sylvester Fox News with Stuart Varney, and the South Florida Business Report with David Weir. On February 14, 2013, Mack testified in front of the House Committee on Ways and Means Hearing on Tax Reform and Charitable Deductions in support of charitable deductions.

In March 2016, Mack announced that he was acting as honorary chairman of the Super PAC known as The Committee to Draft Speaker Ryan, a group dedicated to drafting Paul Ryan as the Republican candidate for President of the United States in 2016. In an interview, Mack revealed that he would support the effort with up to $1 million. Paul Ryan spokeswoman AshLee Strong initially announced that the Speaker was "flattered, but not interested" in the draft effort. Ryan's organization issued a letter to the Federal Election Commission formally distancing Ryan from the Committee. They expressed concerns about confusion to donors and supporters, and reiterated that Ryan had no intention of running for president in 2016. The Committee ended its activities shortly thereafter, announcing that, "It’s become increasingly clear that the committee’s efforts, however well intended, could become an unwanted distraction to the speaker’s current responsibilities."

Mack contributed a number of op-eds to The Hill in 2012 and 2016 relating to charitable donations and the 2016 presidential election. A series of four articles dealt primarily with Republican party politics leading up to the nomination of Donald Trump as the Republican candidate for president, and Mack's efforts to draft Paul Ryan as the party's candidate. Mack also addressed divisions in the Republican party and advocated for the confirmation of Merrick Garland to the Supreme Court of the United States.

Mack also acts as President and CEO of the Earle I. Mack Foundation, a non-profit organization that acted as the initial donor to the Earle Mack School of Law.

== Thoroughbred horse racing ==
Mack has been involved with breeding and racing Thoroughbred horses since 1963. He was a member of the Board of Trustees, New York Racing Association (1990–2004), Chairman of the New York State Racing Commission (1983–1989), Member of the New York State Thoroughbred Racing Capital Investment Fund (1987–1996) and a Member, Board of Directors, of the New York State Thoroughbred Breeding and Development Fund Corp. (1983–1989). Mack is a contributor to the Thoroughbred Retirement Foundation (TRF).

In 2011 Mack started the Earle Mack Thoroughbred Retirement Foundation Award. The award is presented to a recipient who made significant contributions towards improving the safety and welfare of Thoroughbred horses during and after their racing careers. The first winner of the award was Frank Stronach and in August 2012 Mack presented the award to Ogden Mills "Dinny" Phipps. In June 2013, Mack presented the award to Chef Bobby Flay for his actions on behalf of Thoroughbred retirement.

Mack has owned and/or bred more than 25 Thoroughbred stakes winners, and currently owns about 75 Thoroughbred horses in the United States, England, France, Italy and Argentina. His most notable horses include:

1. Manighar (the first horse to ever complete the Group 1-treble of the Australian Cup, Ranvet Stakes, and BMW Cup)
2. Peteski (Canadian Triple Crown Champion, Canadian Horse Racing Hall of Fame, Sovereign Award winner, and Canadian Horse of the Year, 1993)
3. Bruce's Mill (Sovereign Award winner, 1994)
4. Cryptocloser (Sovereign Award winner, 1997)
5. Electrocutionist (Horse of the Year in Italy, 2005)
6. Mr. Light (Grade III winner, Gulfstream Park; set the world record for fastest mile ever run by a Thoroughbred in a competition, 2005)
7. November Snow (winner of the Grade I Test Stakes and Grade I Alabama Stakes at Saratoga, 1992, and international high-weighted 3 year old filly for that year)
8. Roxinho (Brazil's Triple Crown winner and Horse of the Year, 2002)
9. Captain Canuck (Partnered with Centennial Farms Niagara Inc to race this 2010 Canadian Triple Crown Contender)
10. Dylan Mouth (triple Group 1 winner in Italy, including 2015 Premio Roma)

Mack has successfully supported legislation for transparency in all horse sales in Florida. Headlining issues are medication, prohibition against dual agency, prohibition against enhancement medication usage, ownership transparency, and disclosure of medical records in the state of Florida. In August 2012, Mack was elected to the Board of Directors of the Jockey Club, an organization founded in 1894 and dedicated to the improvement of Thoroughbred breeding and racing.

On June 28, 2011, Mack sold Star Plus, son of Alpha Plus, to George Iacovacci on the conditions that he could never be raced again and that Mack would be immediately notified if they no longer wished to take care of the horse so that a suitable retirement home could be found for him. But shortly after the sale Mack learned that the new owner of Star Plus had put the horse back in training and started to enter him in races. After a public outcry, Mack was able to buy back Star Plus and retire him to Old Friends Equine, a horse retirement program in Nicholasville, Kentucky.

== Personal life ==
In 1990, Mack married Carol Dickey; they have two children: Andrew and Beatrice.

Mack describes himself as a "moderate Republican".

Diplomatic posts
Preceded by Bonnie McElveen-Hunter	United States Ambassador to Finland; 2004–2005	Succeeded by Marilyn Ware
