= David S. Mack =

American businessman (born 1942)

- Born: David Makofsky; January 25, 1942 (age 84); Brooklyn, New York, US
- Occupation: Real estate developer
- Known for: Founding board member of Mack-Cali Realty Corporation
- Spouse: Sondra Mack
- Parent(s): Ruth Kaufman; H. Bert Mack
- Family: William L. Mack (brother); Earle I. Mack (brother); Fredric H. Mack (brother)

David S. Mack (born January 25, 1942) is an American businessperson who operated The Mack Company, a New Jersey–based real estate firm founded by his father H. Bert Mack.

Mack has been a major donor to Republican candidates, including Governor George Pataki. Pataki appointed Mack to the Board of Commissioners for the Port Authority. Mack has also been on the board of the Metropolitan Transportation Authority over the period 1993 to 2009 and since 2019.

== Early life and education ==
Mack was born to a Jewish family, the son of Ruth (née Kaufman) and H. Bert Mack. His father founded the real estate development company, the Mack Company. He has three brothers: Earle I. Mack, Fredric H. Mack, and William L. Mack. Mack graduated from Hofstra University in 1967 with a B.A. degree in Business Administration.

== Career ==
Mack is senior partner of The Mack Company, a real estate development firm. The Mack Company merged with Cali Realty Corporation in 1997 – Mack is a director of Mack-Cali Realty Corporation.

== Public service ==
Mack is a member of the boards of Boys Town Jerusalem, Hofstra University, Israel Bonds, Joseph L. Morse Geriatric Center, New York Holocaust Memorial Committee, North Shore-Long Island Jewish Health System Foundation, Palm Beach Community Chest and United Way, Pratt Institute, United Jewish Appeal (UJA) of Greater New York and Long Island, and serves as the president of the Nassau County Police Department Foundation.

He appointed to the Board of Commissioner at the Port Authority of New York and New Jersey by New York Governor George Pataki, until he was forced to resign in 2009.

He has been an honorary deputy superintendent of the New York State Police since 1995 despite having no law enforcement experience. He frequently appeared at State Police formal functions in full dress uniform, which reportedly angered State Police rank-and-file troopers.

Mack has a longstanding relationship with the Nassau County Police Department where he has served as an unsalaried assistant commissioner since at least the mid-1980s. The department issued Mack a police badge.

=== Metropolitan Transportation Authority ===
Mack was a Vice Chairman of the Metropolitan Transportation Authority from December, 1993 until September, 2009. He is the Chair of the Long Island Rail Road/Long Island Bus, Bridges and Tunnels Committee, and a member of the Capital Program Oversight, Finance, Interagency Coordination, Audit, Governance, Diversity, Safety and Security, Capital Construction/Planning and Real Estate, New York City Transit, Metro-North Committees. According to Mack, he used the Long Island Rail Road between five and ten times a year. His term ran through June 30, 2009.

In May 2008, New York State Attorney General Andrew Cuomo announced that the MTA policy of giving free lifetime passes to current and former board members violated New York State law. The MTA board initially resisted changing this policy.

Mack was reappointed to the MTA board in 2019 as the representative for Nassau County. In 2022, the MTA took away placards from MTA board members which had allowed them to park anywhere in the city legally. This led Mack to throw a tantrum. After losing his placard, Mack began voting against MTA plans for congestion pricing in New York City, which had been in the works since 2019.

== Personal life ==
Mack has donated to scholarships and capital programs at his alma-mater, Hofstra University. The David S. Mack Sports and Exhibition Complex, the Sondra and David S. Mack Student Center and Mack Hall are named in his honor.

Mack and his wife Sondra also make charitable donations through the David and Sondra Mack Foundation and are members of the Jewish Federation of Palm Beach County.
