= 1947 in sports =

1947 in sports describes the year's events in world sport.

== American football ==
- NFL Championship: the Chicago Cardinals won 28–21 over the Philadelphia Eagles at Comiskey Park
- Cleveland Browns beat the New York Yankees to win the AAFC championship.
- Notre Dame Fighting Irish – college football national championship

== Association football ==
Colombia

- Atletico Nacional, officially founded in Medellín on March 7.

England

- First Division – Liverpool win the 1946-47 title.
- FA Cup – Charlton Athletic beat Burnley 1-0 after extra time

Spain

- La Liga won by Valencia

Italy

- Serie A won by Torino

Germany

- No major football is held due to the Allied occupation of Germany.

France

- French Division 1 won by CO Roubaix-Tourcoing

Portugal

- Primeira Liga won by Sporting C.P.

Romania

- Asociatia Sportiva an Armatei Bucuresti (Bucharest Army Sports Association FC), a predecessor for Steaua Bucharest FC, officially founded on June 7.

== Australian rules football ==
Victorian Football League

- Carlton wins the 51st VFL Premiership, defeating Essendon 13.8 (86) to 11.19 (85) in the 1947 VFL Grand Final.
- Brownlow Medal awarded to Bert Deacon (Carlton)

South Australian National Football League

- 4 October – West Adelaide win their sixth SANFL premiership, defeating Norwood 10.15 (75) to 5.15 (45)
- Magarey Medal awarded to Bob Hank (West Torrens)

Western Australian National Football League

- 11 October – South Fremantle with their third WA(N)FL premiership but first since 1917, defeating West Perth 13.8 (86) to 9.17 (71)
- Sandover Medal awarded to Clive Lewington (South Fremantle)

== Baseball ==
- January 20 – death of Josh Gibson (35), famed Negro leagues slugger
- Jackie Robinson becomes the first African-American baseball player in Major League Baseball.
- April 27 – Babe Ruth Day was celebrated all across the Major Leagues, with Babe himself appearing at Yankee Stadium. Although stricken with throat cancer, Ruth said to the audience: "The only real game I think in the world is baseball."
- World Series – New York Yankees beat Brooklyn Dodgers 4 games to 3.
- June 27–28 – In the inaugural College World Series, California defeats Yale 2 games to 0 in the best-of-three series. The Yale team featured future U.S. President George Bush.
- Negro World Series – New York Cubans defeat the Cleveland Buckeyes, 4 games to 1.

== Basketball ==
BAA (NBA)

- Wataru Misaka of the New York Knicks became the first person of color to play in modern professional basketball, just months after Jackie Robinson had broken the color barrier in Major League Baseball for the Brooklyn Dodgers.

BAA (NBA) Finals

- Philadelphia Warriors over Chicago Stags (4–1)

NBL Championship

- Chicago American Gears over Rochester Royals (3–1)

== Boxing ==
- Rocky Graziano defeats Tony Zale to win boxing's world middleweight championship.
- December 5 – Joe Louis defeats Jersey Joe Walcott to retain his heavyweight championship

== Canadian football ==
- Grey Cup – Toronto Argonauts defeat Winnipeg Blue Bombers 10–9

== Cricket ==
Events

- Denis Compton and Bill Edrich both beat Tom Hayward’s 1906 record of 3,518 runs in a first-class season.
- England tour Australia for the first Ashes series since 1938, losing three Tests to nil
- South Africa tour England for the first time since 1935, losing three Tests to nil

England

- County Championship – Middlesex
- Minor Counties Championship – Surrey Second Eleven
- Most runs – Denis Compton 3,816 @ 90.85 (HS 246)
- Most wickets – Tom Goddard 238 @ 17.38 (BB 9–41)
- Wisden Cricketers of the Year – Alan Melville, Norman Yardley, Martin Donnelly, Dudley Nourse, Jack Robertson

Australia

- Sheffield Shield – Victoria
- Most runs – Denis Compton 1,432 @ 65.09 (HS 163)
- Most wickets – Doug Wright 51 @ 33.31 (BB 7–105)

India

- Ranji Trophy – 7–11 March: Baroda defeated Holkar by an innings and 409 runs

New Zealand

- Plunket Shield – Auckland

South Africa

- Currie Cup – Western Province

== Figure skating ==
- World Figure Skating Championship
  - Men's champion: Hans Gerschwiler, Switzerland
  - Ladies' champion: Barbara Ann Scott, Canada
  - Pair skating champions: Micheline Lannoy & Pierre Baugniet, Belgium

== Golf ==
Men's professional

- Masters Tournament – Jimmy Demaret
- U.S. Open – Lew Worsham
- PGA Championship – Jim Ferrier
- British Open – Fred Daly

Men's amateur

- British Amateur – Willie Turnesa
- U.S. Amateur – Skee Riegel

Women's professional

- Women's Western Open – Louise Suggs
- U.S. Women's Open – Betty Jameson
- Titleholders Championship – Babe Zaharias

== Horse racing ==
Steeplechases

- Cheltenham Gold Cup – Fortina
- Grand National – Caughoo

Hurdle races

- Champion Hurdle – National Spirit

Flat races

- September 1, 1947: Calumet Farm of Lexington, Kentucky became the first stable in Thoroughbred racing history to surpass $1 million in annual earnings when Armed won the Washington Park Handicap.
- Australia – Melbourne Cup won by Hiraji
- Canada – King's Plate won by Moldy
- France – Prix de l'Arc de Triomphe won by Le Paillon
- Ireland – Irish Derby Stakes won by Sayajirao
- English Triple Crown Races:
  1. 2,000 Guineas Stakes – Tudor Minstrel
  2. The Derby – Pearl Diver
  3. St. Leger Stakes – Sayajirao
- United States Triple Crown Races:
  1. Kentucky Derby – Jet Pilot
  2. Preakness Stakes – Faultless. This race is remembered for radio race caller Clem McCarthy declaring Jet Pilot the winner when in reality it was Faultless.
  3. Belmont Stakes – Phalanx

== Ice hockey ==
- Toronto Maple Leafs defeat Montreal Canadiens 4 games to 2 to win the Stanley Cup. Ted "Teeder" Kennedy scores the match-winning goal late in game six to win the Maple Leafs their first of three straight Cups, the first time any NHL team has accomplished that feat.

== Rowing ==
The Boat Race

- 29 March — Cambridge wins the 93rd Oxford and Cambridge Boat Race

== Rugby league ==
- 1946–47 European Rugby League Championship/1947–48 European Rugby League Championship
- 1947 New Zealand rugby league season
- 1947 NSWRFL season
- 1946–47 Northern Rugby Football League season/1947–48 Northern Rugby Football League season

== Rugby union ==
Five Nations Championship

- 53rd Five Nations Championship series is shared by England and Wales

== Snooker ==
- World Snooker Championship – Walter Donaldson beats Fred Davis 82–63.

== Speed skating ==
Speed Skating World Championships

- Men's All-round Champion – Lassi Parkkinen (Finland)
- Women's All-round Champion – Verné Lesche (Finland)

== Tennis ==
Australia

- Australian Men's Singles Championship – Dinny Pails (Australia) defeats John Bromwich (Australia) 4–6, 6–4, 3–6, 7–5, 8–6
- Australian Women's Singles Championship – Nancye Wynne Bolton (Australia) defeats Nell Hall Hopman (Australia) 6–3, 6–2

England

- Wimbledon Men's Singles Championship – Jack Kramer (USA) defeats Tom Brown (USA) 6–1, 6–3, 6–2
- Wimbledon Women's Singles Championship – Margaret Osborne duPont (USA) defeats Doris Hart (USA) 6–2, 6–4

France

- French Men's Singles Championship – József Asbóth (Hungary) defeats Eric Sturgess (South Africa) 8–6, 7–5, 6–4
- French Women's Singles Championship – Patricia Canning Todd (USA) defeats Doris Hart (USA) 6–3, 3–6, 6–4

USA

- American Men's Singles Championship – Jack Kramer (USA) defeats Frank Parker (USA) 4–6, 2–6, 6–1, 6–0, 6–3
- American Women's Singles Championship – Louise Brough Clapp (USA) defeated Margaret Osborne duPont (USA) 8–6, 4–6, 6–1

Davis Cup

- 1947 Davis Cup – United States 4–1 Australia at West Side Tennis Club (grass) New York City, United States

== Awards ==
- Associated Press Male Athlete of the Year – Johnny Lujack, College football
- Associated Press Female Athlete of the Year – Babe Didrikson Zaharias, LPGA golf
