= 1947 Preakness Stakes =

72nd running of the Preakness Stakes

72nd Preakness Stakes
- Preakness Stakes
- Location: Pimlico Race Course, Baltimore, Maryland, United States
- Date: May 10, 1947
- Winning horse: Faultless
- Winning time: 1:59 0/0
- Jockey: Douglas Dodson
- Trainer: Jimmy Jones
- Owner: Calumet Farm
- Conditions: Three-year-olds, 126 lbs.
- Surface: Dirt

The 1947 Preakness Stakes was the 72nd running of the $100,000 added Preakness Stakes, a horse race for three-year-old Thoroughbreds. The second leg of the U.S. Triple Crown series took place on May 10, 1947, and was run seven days after the 1947 Kentucky Derby. Ridden by Douglas Dodson, who was praised by the Daily Racing Form for a smart ride, Faultless won the mile and three sixteenths race by one and a quarter lengths over runner-up On Trust with the betting favorite Phalanx in third. Jet Pilot, winner of the Kentucky Derby, finished fourth. The race was run on a track rated fast in a final time of 1:59 flat.

== Payout ==
The 72nd Preakness Stakes Payout Schedule

Horse Name	Win	Place	Show
Faultless	$10.40	$4.80	$2.80
On Trust	-	$7.00	$3.40
Phalanx			$2.20

== The full chart ==
1947 Preakess Stakes scheduled starters, jockeys, trainers, owners

Finish Position	Lengths Behind	Post Position	Horse name	Jockey	Trainer	Owner	Post Time Odds	Earnings
1st	0	2	Faultless	Douglas Dodson	Jimmy Jones	Calumet Farm	4.20-1	$98,500
2nd	1¼	1	On Trust	Johnny Longden	William Molter	Earl O. Stice & Sons	8.10-1	$20,000
3rd	2½	8	Phalanx	Sylvester Veitch	Eddie Arcaro	Cornelius Vanderbilt Whitney	1.10-1	$10,000
4th	1¼	7	Jet Pilot	Eric Guerin	Tom Smith	Maine Chance Farm	5.60-1	$5,000
5th	½	3	Riskolater	William Balzaretti	Burton B. Williams	Circle M Farm (Edward S. Moore)	89.30-1	
6th	1	9	Cosmic Bomb	Shelby Clark	Willie Booth	William G. Helis Sr.	26.20-1	
7th	1	5	Secnav	Conn McCreary	Horatio Luro	Mill River Stable (Josephine Hartford Douglas)	56.50-1	
8th	HD	4	Bullet Proof	Wayne D. Wright	Henry S. Clark	Liz Whitney	26.20-1	
9th	6	11	Cornish Knight	Albert Snider	Albert E. Alexandra	E. P. Taylor	57.50-1	
10th	NK	6	Contest	Warren Mehrtens	Max Hirsch	King Ranch	27.60-1	
11th	8	10	King Bay	Robert Campbell	Ray White	Bernard J. Bax	23.90-1	

- Winning breeder: Calumet Farm (KY)
- Times: 1/4 mile 0:23 2/5; 1/2 mile – 0:47 1/5; 3/4 mile – 1:12 1/5; mile – 1:39 1/5; 1 3/16 – 1:59 0/0.
- Track condition: fast

== Clem McCarthy's Blunder ==
During the homestretch of the Preakness, radio broadcaster Clem McCarthy mistakenly called Jet Pilot the leader and eventually the winner until Clem made a big mistake, and later apologize to the radio audience and correctly named Faultless the winner.
