= 1947 Kentucky Derby =

Horse race

73rd Kentucky Derby
- Kentucky Derby
- Grade I stakes race
- Location: Churchill Downs
- Date: May 3, 1947
- Winning horse: Jet Pilot
- Winning time: 2:06 4/5
- Final odds: 5.40:1
- Jockey: Eric Guerin
- Trainer: R. Thomas Smith
- Owner: Maine Chance Farm
- Conditions: Three-year-olds
- Surface: Dirt

The 1947 Kentucky Derby was the 73rd running of the Kentucky Derby. The race took place on May 3, 1947, on a track rated slow. Jet Pilot led wire-to-wire and won in a three-horse photo finish. Jet Pilot finished a head in front of Phalanx and a length ahead of Faultless. Faultless went on to win the 1947 Preakness Stakes while Phalanx won the 1947 Belmont Stakes.

== Full results ==
Finished	Post	Horse	Jockey	Trainer	Owner	Time / behind
1st	11	Jet Pilot	Eric Guerin	R. Thomas Smith	Maine Chance Farm	2:06 4/5
2nd	8	Phalanx	Eddie Arcaro	Sylvester Veitch	Cornelius Vanderbilt Whitney	
3rd	5	Faultless	Douglas Dodson	Horace A. Jones	Calumet Farm	
4th	9	On Trust	Johnny Longden	William Molter	Earl O. Stice & Sons	
5th	2	Cosmic Bomb	Shelby Clark	Willie Booth	William G. Helis Sr.	
6th	7	Star Reward	Steve Brooks	Jack C. Hodgins	Dixiana	
7th	6	Bullet Proof	Wayne D. Wright	Henry S. Clark	Liz Whitney	
8th	1A	W. L. Sickle	Robert Campbell	Graceton Philpot	W-L Ranch Co.	
9th	1	Stepfather	Jack Westrope	Graceton Philpot	W-L Ranch Co.	
10th	3	Liberty Road	Job Dean Jessop	Preston M. Burch	Brookmeade Stable	
11th	10	Riskolater	William Balzaretti	Burton B. Williams	Circle M Farm (Edward S. Moore)	
12th	4	Double Jay	John Gilbert	Walter L. McCue	Ridgewood Stable	
13th	12	Jett-jett	William Hanka	E. C. Dobson	William M. Peavey	

- Winning breeder: Arthur B. Hancock & Margaret Good Van Clief (KY)
