= Lord Putnam =

American-bred Thoroughbred racehorse

- Sire: Requested
- Grandsire: Questionnaire
- Dam: Star Miss
- Damsire: Hadagal
- Sex: Stallion
- Foaled: 1948
- Country: United States
- Color: Brown
- Breeder: Albert Bryant Karsner
- Owner: 1) Sara Chait; 2) Putnam Stable (Burton & Sara Chait)
- Trainer: George Riola
- Record: 10: 5-0-1
- Earnings: US$35,775

Major wins
- William Penn Stakes (1950); Narragansett Nursery Stakes (1950); World's Playground Stakes (1950)

Lord Putnam (foaled 1948 in Kentucky) was an American Thoroughbred racehorse that, as a two-year-old, broke the track record at two different racetracks in the first three starts of his racing career.

== Background ==
Lord Putnam was a son of Requested who had a very good two-year-old campaign in 1941 with seven stakes wins on the big New York state tracks. At three he won the Flamingo Stakes and the Wood Memorial and was second to future Hall of Famer Alsab in the 1942 Preakness Stakes. At stud, Requested proved to be a good sire. The best of his progeny was the 1948 American Champion Three-Year-Old Filly, Miss Request.

Star Miss was the dam of Lord Putnam. She was a daughter of Hadagal, a multiple stakes winner and track record setter who was a son of the great Sir Gallahad. The sire of three Kentucky Derby Winners, Sir Gallahad was the Leading sire in North America four times and the Leading broodmare sire in North America a record 12 times.

== Racing career ==
In a May 1, 1950 article, the Daily Racing Form advised readers that the still unraced two-year-old Lord Putnam had been training very well and was a horse to watch, adding that the colt figured to be a factor in his first start. The DRF was right.

Lord Putnam's trainer was California-born George Riola who is remembered for a March 18, 1933 win he had with the colt Pharatime in the Duncan F. Kenner Stakes at Fair Grounds Race Course. For Pharatime's young jockey it was a special moment, marking the first ever stakes win for Eddie Arcaro in what would become a most illustrious Hall of Fame career.

On May 13, 1950, Lord Putnam made his racing debut at Garden State Park in Camden, New Jersey. Veteran Canadian-born jockey Nick Wall, a 1938 U.S. National Champion rider, was aboard Lord Putnam for his winning debut. An allowance race, Lord Putnam broke the track record with a time of 58 1/5 seconds for the five furlong distance. Nick Wall would again be the jockey in his next start on May 27 at Garden State Park. This time, it would be the William Penn Stakes and to get his second victory Lord Putnam defeated five runners, including the highly regarded Brookfield Farm colt Iswas.

When the stable moved to race at Monmouth Park, jockey Robert Strange was hired to be Lord Putnam's jockey. On June 24, Strange rode him to a second track record win in three career starts. Adding to his two-year-old racing legacy, Lord Putnam's fourth straight win came on July 4 at Narragansett Park in Pawtucket, Rhode Island. He won the five and one-half furlong Narragansett Nursery Stakes even though it was contested over a sloppy racetrack whereas all his other wins had all been on surfaces rated fast.

Brought back to Monmouth Park for the July 26 Sapling Stakes, Lord Putnam suffered his first defeat in the six furlong event at the hands of winner Battlefield and runner-up Uncle Miltie. Owned by George D. Widener Jr., ironically Battlefield's jockey was Eddie Arcaro.

After five weeks of rest, on September 2 Lord Putnam came back to win for the fifth time in what would be his last race of 1950. The World's Playground Stakes, a six furlong sprint hosted by New Jersey's Atlantic City Race Course, had a field of nine starters running on a muddy track. Lord Putnam caught longshot runner-up War Phar in the stretch to win by a length. Other notable rivals he defeated included third-place finisher Pictus from the Florence Clark stable and Uncle Miltie who had finished ahead of Lord Putnam in the Sapling Stakes.

Lord Putnam began his three-year-old campaign on April 4, 1951, at New York's Jamaica Racetrack. The betting favorite to win, he finished twelfth behind Repertoire in a field of thirteen runners for the six furlong Experimental Handicap No.1. which also included Count Turf who would go on to win the 1951 Kentucky Derby. Ridden by Canadian Hedley Woodhouse, Uncle Miltie won Jamaica Racetrack's Prospect Purse, a six furlong allowance race with Lord Putnam fourth by more than six lengths.

April 21, 1951 would be Lord Putnam's third straight start in April at the Jamaica track, he ran tenth out of the eleven starters to winner Repertoire in the important Wood Memorial Stakes. Lord Putnam raced for the last time on May 22 after again demonstrating his continued inability to compete at or near his two-year-old level when he ran last in a field of seven in the Garden City Purse, a six furlong allowance race at Belmont Park.

== At stud ==
Lord Putnam's first year at stud was 1953 and an advertisement in the May 2, 1955 edition of the Daily Racing Form said he was standing for a fee of $1,000 at Hillandale Farm on Muir Station Pike near Lexington, Kentucky and that his book had been sold out in each of his three years as a breeding stallion.

Lord Putnam sired a number of race and stakes winners including the 1960 Gravesend and Select Handicaps winner, Brush Fire (1957). His most successful runner was the racemare Rose O'Neill (1958) owned by Mr. & Mrs. Bert W. Martin. She won both the Hollywood Oaks and Interborough Handicap in 1961 and then in 1962 the New Castle Stakes plus the Distaff, Santa Maria, Sheepshead Bay and Vagrancy Handicaps.
