= William Penn Stakes =

- Class: Discontinued stakes
- Location: Garden State Park Racetrack, Camden, New Jersey
- Inaugurated: 1942
- Race type: Thoroughbred - Flat racing

Race information
- Distance: 5 furlongs
- Surface: Dirt
- Track: left-handed
- Qualification: Two-year-old colts & geldings

The William Penn Stakes was an American Thoroughbred horse race run between 1942 and 1956 at Garden State Park Racetrack in Camden, New Jersey. A race for two-year-old colts and geldings on dirt, it was contested at a distance of six furlongs from inception thru 1947 after which it was shortened to five furlongs.

Garden State Park opened in 1942. The city of Camden is situated across the Delaware River from Philadelphia, Pennsylvania, a city with more than twenty times the population of Camden which provided an extremely important source from which to draw patrons for the racetrack. The William Penn Stakes honors the founder of the Province of Pennsylvania.

The event was successful from early in its history. By 1948 the William Penn Stakes had become one of the track's most popular races.

When Blue Peter got his third Camden track record in winning the 1948 race it would add further lustre to the event and for the 1949 edition the 35,110 patrons who showed up would be the largest crowd of the season. Once again speed would be front at center when, in his May 13, 1950 career debut, Lord Putnam broke Garden State Park's track record for five furlongs. In winning the May 27 William Penn Stakes, Lord Putnam set a new stakes record and then in his next outing remarkably broke a different track's record time, this one at Monmouth Park in Oceanport, New Jersey.

By 1953 more and more of the major New York owned and based stables were sending their two-year-olds to compete in the William Penn Stakes. Among them were the likes of Maine Chance Farm, owned by cosmetics magnate Elizabeth Arden, the Wheatley Stable of Gladys Mills Phipps and her brother, Ogden Livingston Mills, as well as the Brookmeade Stable belonging to automobile heiress Isabel Dodge Sloane. Unfortunately for them, all were beaten in the 1953 edition by Duc De Fer, a local horse bred and raced by J. Warfield Rodgers. Duc De Fer would race successfully for five years and retire with earnings of $225,791 (about $2.34 million in 2021). Increased purses at the New York tracks saw a significant drop off in their participation in the 1954 running. The effect would see the William Penn Stakes placed on hiatus in 1955 and while it was brought back on May 9, 1956, that would be its final running.

In 1957, the track's owners dropped the William Penn Stakes to help them supplement the purse for the Garden State Stakes, also a race for two-year old colts and geldings. The purse would be the largest offered anywhere in the world.

== Records ==
Speed record:

- 0:58.80 @ 5 furlongs: Lord Putnam (1950)
- 1:11.40 @ 6 furlongs: Jobstown (1946)

Most wins by a jockey:

- 2 - Nick Wall (1943, 1950)
- 2 - John Gilbert (1945, 1949)
- 2 - Sam Boulmetis (1952, 1956)

Most wins by a trainer:

- No trainer won this race more than once.

Most wins by an owner:

- No owner won this race more than once.

== Winners ==
Year	Winner	Age	Jockey	Trainer	Owner	Dist. (Miles)	Time	Win $
1956	Balaklava	2	Sam Boulmetis	Thomas H. Heard Jr.	George F. Strickland	5 f	0:59.00	$8,700
1955	Race not held							
1954	Right Down	2	Basil James	Sidney Jacobs	Sidney Jacobs	5 f	0:59.40	$12,825
1953	Duc de Fer	2	Logan Batcheller	Edgar S. Brumfield	J. Warfield Rodgers	5 f	1:00.40	$11,100
1952	Fort Salonga	2	Sam Boulmetis	E. W. King	Samuel P. Steckler	5 f	0:59.00	$9,225
1951	Metal Mike	2	Nick Combest	Winbert F. Mulholland	Fitz Eugene Dixon Jr.	5 f	0:59.60	$13,725
1950	Lord Putnam	2	Nick Wall	George Riola	Sara Chait	5 f	0:58.80	$
1949	Quiz Show	2	John Gilbert	Joseph H. Pierce Sr.	Palatine Stable (Frank Rosen)	5 f	0:59.00	$10,125
1948	Blue Peter	2	Wayne D. Wright	Andy Schuttinger	Joseph M. Roebling	5 f	0:59.20	$11,225
1947	Dr. Almac	2	Charles Wahler	James V. Stewart	Mrs. James V. Stewart	6 f	1:12.00	$10,575
1946	Jobstown	2	Herb Lindberg	Willie Booth	William G. Helis Sr.	6 f	1:11.40	$10,800
1945	Air Hero	2	John Gilbert	John P. (Doc) Jones	Crispin Oglebay	6 f	1:14.60	$9,650
1944	Alexis	2	Ken Scawthorn	John A. Healey	Christiana Stable	6 f	1:11.60	$8,100
1943	Dance Team	2	Nick Wall	Preston M. Burch	Longchamps Farms	6 f	1:13.20	$5,830
1942	Ogma	2	J. Boyle	Burton B. Williams	Thomas B. Cromwell	6 f	1:12.80	$5,430
