= Pompoon =

American-bred Thoroughbred racehorse

- Sire: Pompey
- Grandsire: Sun Briar
- Dam: Oonagh
- Damsire: Friar Rock
- Sex: Stallion
- Foaled: 1934
- Country: United States
- Color: Bay
- Breeder: William R. Coe
- Owner: Jerome H. Louchheim
- Trainer: Cyrus Field Clarke at 2 and 3 Johnny Loftus at 4 and 5
- Record: 26: 10-8-1
- Earnings: $153,060

Major wins
- Belmont Futurity Stakes (1936); Junior Champion Stakes (1936); National Stallion Stakes (1936); Paumonok Handicap (1937); Dixie Handicap (1938); San Carlos Handicap (1938)

Awards
- American Champion Two-Year-Old Colt (1936)

Pompoon (1934–1939) was an American Thoroughbred racehorse who was voted American Champion Two-Year-Old Colt for 1936.

Owned by the prominent Philadelphia contractor and majority owner and president of CBS, Jerome H. Louchheim, Pompoon was trained by Cyrus Field Clarke at age two and three. The colt won the Belmont Futurity Stakes and defeated War Admiral to win the National Stallion Stakes. At age three, he finished second in both the 1937 Kentucky Derby and 1937 Preakness Stakes to War Admiral who went on to win the Triple Crown.

Former top-level jockey and future U.S. Racing Hall of Fame inductee Johnny Loftus took over as Pompoon's trainer in 1938. His major wins for Loftus came in Dixie Handicap at Pimlico Race Course and the San Carlos Handicap at California's Santa Anita Park.

Pompoon died on November 14, 1939, as the result of a kidney infection and twisted intestine.
