= Pompey (horse) =

American-bred Thoroughbred racehorse

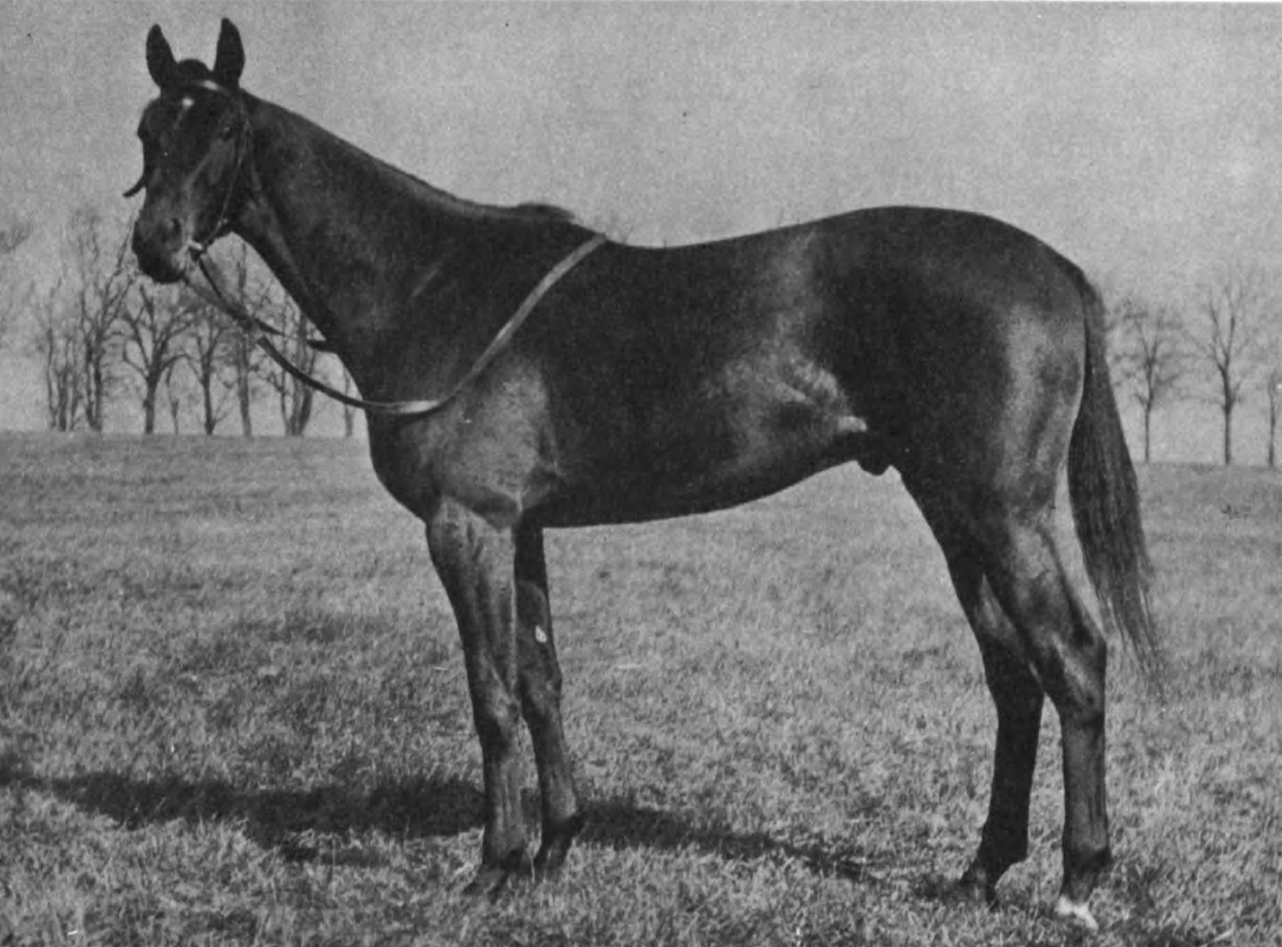
- Pompey
- Sire: Sun Briar
- Grandsire: Sundridge
- Dam: Cleopatra
- Damsire: Corcyra
- Sex: Stallion
- Foaled: 1923
- Country: United States
- Colour: Bay
- Breeder: William Robertson Coe
- Owner: Shoshone Stable
- Trainer: William H. Karrick
- Record: 35: 13–7–7
- Earnings: US$143,495

Major wins
- Belmont Futurity Stakes (1925); Hopeful Stakes (1925); East View Stakes (1925); United States Hotel Stakes (1925); Wood Stakes (1926); Wilton Handicap (1926); Saratoga Inaugural Handicap (1927); Blue Mountain Handicap (1927)

Awards
- American Champion Two-Year-Old Colt (1925)

Pompey (1923–1944) was an American Champion Thoroughbred racehorse.

== Background ==
Pompey was bred by William Coe and raced under the colors of his Shoshone Stable. Pompey was a son of Cleopatra and Sun Briar who also sired U.S. Racing Hall of Fame inductee, Sun Beau. Sun Briar's dam was Sweet Briar, a French daughter of Leopold de Rothschild's St. Frusquin, whose wins included the Classic 2,000 Guineas Stakes and who was the Leading sire in Great Britain and Ireland in 1903 and 1907. He was trained by William Karrick.

== Racing career ==
=== 1925: two-year-old season ===
Pompey won seven of ten starts in 1925 including the United States Hotel Stakes, East View Stakes, and defeated arch rival Chance Play in the two most important races of the year for two-year-olds, the August 29 Hopeful Stakes at Saratoga Race Course and the September 12 Futurity Stakes at Belmont Park. Voted the 1925 American Champion Two-Year-Old Colt, Pompey was an early favorite to win the 1926 Kentucky Derby.

=== 1926: three-year-old season ===
In his 1926 season debut, Pompey won the May 1st Wood Stakes at New York's Jamaica Race Course. He was not entered in the Preakness Stakes which that year was run on May 10 and was the first leg of the U.S. Triple Crown series. On May 15, Pompey was sent off as the second choice by bettors in the Derby at Churchill Downs in Louisville, Kentucky. Ridden by Laverne Fator, in the mile and a quarter event the colt faded after three-quarters of a mile and finished fifth to winner, Bubbling Over. Pompey did not run in the final leg of the Triple Crown, the Belmont Stakes.

Pompey went on to win the Wilton Handicap at Saratoga Race Course, a prep race for the prestigious Travers Stakes in which he would finish second. He would also finish second in the 1926 Edgemere Handicap at Aqueduct Racetrack, this time losing to Peanuts by a head in a World Record time of 1:48 3/5 for a mile and a furlong on dirt.

=== 1927: four-year-old season ===
At age four, Pompey competed with some success, winning the August 1, 1927 Inaugural Handicap at Saratoga Race Course and on August 23 running the fastest six furlongs of the Saratoga summer meet with a time of 1:11 2–5 while winning the Blue Mountain Handicap.

== Stud record ==
Pompey sired a number of race winners, the best of which were Ladysman, Some Pomp, and Pompoon. Some Pomp earned 1935 Co-American Champion Older Female Horse honors and both Ladysman and Pompoon won American Champion Two-Year-Old Colt honors in 1932 and 1936 respectively. Pompey's top earner, however, was Rippey (b. 1943), a multiple stakes winner whose career earnings topped $299,000.

Pompey's daughter, Outdone, was the dam of 1958 Kentucky Broodmare of the Year, Miss Disco, as well as the second dam of the very great sire, Bold Ruler. Through another daughter, Delmarie, Pompey was also the damsire of Count Turf, winner of the 1951 Kentucky Derby He was also the damsire of the 1947 American Grand National steeplechase winner, Adaptable.

Pompey died at age twenty-one in 1944.

== Sire line tree ==
- Pompey
  - Osculator
    - Siete Leguas
  - Caesars Ghost
  - Ladysman
  - Pompoon
  - Strobo
  - Rippey

== Pedigree ==
Pedigree of Pompey, bay stallion, 1923
Sire Sun Briar	Sundridge	Amphion	Rosebery
Sire Sun Briar	Sundridge	Amphion	Suicide
Sire Sun Briar	Sundridge	Sierra	Springfield
Sire Sun Briar	Sundridge	Sierra	Sanda
Sire Sun Briar	Sweet Briar	St Frusquin	St Simon*^
Sire Sun Briar	Sweet Briar	St Frusquin	Isabel
Sire Sun Briar	Sweet Briar	Presentation	Orion
Sire Sun Briar	Sweet Briar	Presentation	Dubia
Dam Cleopatra	Corcyra	Polymelus	Cyllene
Dam Cleopatra	Corcyra	Polymelus	Maid Marian
Dam Cleopatra	Corcyra	Pearmain	Persimmon^
Dam Cleopatra	Corcyra	Pearmain	Nenemoosha
Dam Cleopatra	Gallice	Gallinule	Isonomy
Dam Cleopatra	Gallice	Gallinule	Moorhen
Dam Cleopatra	Gallice	St Cecilia	St Serf^
Dam Cleopatra	Gallice	St Cecilia	Melody (family: 3-j)

*^ Pompey is inbred 4S x 5D x 5D to the stallion St Simon, meaning that he appears fourth generation once on the sire side of his pedigree and fifth generation twice (via Persimmon and St Serf)^ on the dam side of his pedigree.
