= Count Turf =

American-bred Thoroughbred racehorse

- Sire: Count Fleet
- Grandsire: Reigh Count
- Dam: Delmarie
- Damsire: Pompey
- Sex: Stallion
- Foaled: 1948
- Country: United States
- Colour: Bay
- Breeder: Dr. & Mrs. Frank Porter Miller
- Owner: Jack Joseph Amiel
- Trainer: 1) Sol Rutchick; 2) William B. Finnegan
- Record: 45: 8-4-6
- Earnings: $166,375

Major wins
- Dover Stakes (1950); Questionnaire Handicap (1953) U.S. Triple Crown wins: Kentucky Derby (1951)

Honours
- Count Turf Drive, Louisville, Kentucky
- Last updated on May 27, 2010

Count Turf (April 27, 1948 – October 18, 1966) was a champion American Thoroughbred racehorse who won the 1951 Kentucky Derby. His grandsire Reigh Count won the 1928 Kentucky Derby and his sire Count Fleet won the 1943 Kentucky Derby and went on to win the Triple Crown. The only other father/son/grandson combination to win the Kentucky Derby was Pensive, Ponder, and Needles.

== Background ==
Bred and raised at Runnymede Farm near Paris, Kentucky, Count Turf was owned by New York City restaurateur Jack Amiel who bought him at a yearling sale for $3,700. Amiel named him Count for his sire and Turf for his Turf Restaurant in Times Square. In the mid-1950s, Amiel dispensed with his ownership of the Turf Restaurant and became a co-owner of next-door's Jack Dempsey's Broadway Restaurant.

== Racing career ==
Racing at age two, Count Turf's best showings were second-place finishes in both the Youthful Stakes and the Christiana Stakes. Wintered in Florida, at age three he showed little promise in the races leading up to the 1951 Kentucky Derby. Conditioned by Turkish-born trainer Sol Rutchick, the colt finished off the board in the Flamingo and Everglades Stakes in Florida and in the Wood Memorial Stakes at Aqueduct Racetrack in Jamaica, New York.

In the 1951 Kentucky Derby, Count Turf was one of twenty horses entered. Harry Guggenheim's colt Battle Morn was the betting favorite with Cornelius Vanderbilt Whitney's eventual Horse of the Year Counterpoint, the second choice. Counterpoint was Count Turf's half-brother through their common sire, Count Fleet. Given almost no chance of winning, Count Turf was part of a five-horse betting "field" with long-shot odds of 15–1. In the race, he was well placed in the front-middle of the pack and after taking the lead at the top of the homestretch he never looked back and won by four lengths over an over 53-1 long shot named Royal Mustang. Favorite Battle Morn never was in contention and finished 6th while Counterpoint tired badly after making a run at the leaders and wound up 11th. For future U.S. Hall of Hame jockey Conn McCreary, it was his second Derby victory, having won the 1944 race aboard Pensive.

For the ensuing two legs of the Triple Crown series, Count Turf did not run in Preakness Stakes but then finished seventh in the Belmont Stakes, twenty lengths back of winner Counterpoint. In October 1951, Count Turf was sent to race in California under the care of trainer Bill Finnegan. Racing at age four and five, he met with limited success, his most notable performance a win in the 1953 Questionnaire Handicap at Jamaica Race Course but he came out of the race lame and was retired.

== Stud career ==
At stud, Count Turf stood at Almahurst Farm in Nicholasville, Kentucky, then at Elmhurst Farm near Lexington, and finally at Windy Hills Farm in Westminster, Maryland. As a sire, his accomplishments were modest, producing only two stakes race winners. One of those was Manassa Mauler, so-named by Jack Amiel for the widely known pugilistic nickname of his friend Jack Dempsey.

Count Turf died in 1966 and is buried at Windy Hills Farm.

== Pedigree ==
Pedigree of Count Turf
Sire Count Fleet	Reigh Count	Sunreigh	Sundridge*
Sire Count Fleet	Reigh Count	Sunreigh	Sweet Briar*
Sire Count Fleet	Reigh Count	Contessina	Count Schomberg
Sire Count Fleet	Reigh Count	Contessina	Pitti
Sire Count Fleet	Quickly	Haste	Maintenant
Sire Count Fleet	Quickly	Haste	Miss Malaprop
Sire Count Fleet	Quickly	Stephanie	Stefan The Great
Sire Count Fleet	Quickly	Stephanie	Malachite
Dam Delmarie	Pompey	Sun Briar	Sundridge*
Dam Delmarie	Pompey	Sun Briar	Sweet Briar*
Dam Delmarie	Pompey	Cleopatra	Corcyra*
Dam Delmarie	Pompey	Cleopatra	Gallice
Dam Delmarie	Charming Note	Polymelian	Polymelus
Dam Delmarie	Charming Note	Polymelian	Pasquita*
Dam Delmarie	Charming Note	Alburn	Alcantara
Dam Delmarie	Charming Note	Alburn	Face A Main

* Count Turf is inbred 4S x 4D x 5D to the stallion Sundridge, meaning that he appears fourth generation on the sire side of his pedigree and fourth generation and fifth generation (via Pasquita) on the dam side of his pedigree.

* Count Turf is inbred 4S x 4D to the mare Sweet Briar, meaning that she appears fourth generation on the sire side of his pedigree and fourth generation on the dam side of his pedigree.

* Count Turf is inbred 5D x 4D to the stallion Polymelus, meaning that he appears fifth generation (via Corcyra) and fourth generation on the dam side of his pedigree.
