= Eleanor Searle =

American independent woman (1908–2002)

Eleanor Searle Whitney McCollum (c. 1908 – August 12, 2002) was an independent woman of means who was married to two important American men, Cornelius Vanderbilt Whitney and Leonard Franklin "Mac" McCollum. She achieved a unique and separable identity as a philanthropist and community organizer in Houston, Texas. Her contributions included the establishment of the Eleanor McCollum Competition for Young Singers of Houston Grand Opera, patronage for Orbis International, and, together with her second husband, an important role in the development of Baylor College of Medicine.

== Early life ==
She was born in Plymouth, Ohio, to Bertha Fenner Searle and Dr. George James Searle. Her vocal and performing skills led to enrollment in Florida Southern College where she focused on theatrical and voice skills.

== Career ==
She subsequently became a student of voice in New York City and an opera singer until her first marriage. In 1957, after her divorce, she resumed her singing career, with an emphasis on faith-based activities including a stint with Billy Graham Ministries. An autobiography "Invitation to Joy" was published in 1971 by Harper and Row.

Her later years were consumed with raising funds for a historic restoration, the Heritage Center Museum, in Plymouth, Ohio, the Eleanor McCollum Competition for Young Singers Concert of Arias, and a continuation of fund raising for Orbis International initiated by her husband. The Orbis International DC-10 converted to a "state of the art" eye hospital provides care for surgically correctable eye disease. It brings unique and technically demanding eye surgery to many third world countries and also functions as a classroom to teach local physicians and health care providers techniques to prevent blindness.

Although she lived a colorful life (featured on a cover of Life Magazine in 1946), the trait that characterized this exceptional woman was enthusiasm for charitable activity. Even in her 90s she remained active in fund raising for her favorite charities. She was perhaps best known for the establishment of a national competition for young opera singers. The Houston Grand Opera Studio was established by Houston Grand Opera to provide young singers with the opportunity to further develop skills as an interim step between university or music school training and development of a career. The Eleanor McCollum Competition for Young Singers is used to select aspiring singers for this program. The finalists are selected at an annual concert, the "Concert of Arias". Those who attended the Concert of Arias event featuring the finalists of the Competition for Young Singers remember the flourish that characterized Eleanor McCollum's stage entrance for the final awards, even in her 90s. She was indefatigable in her efforts to raise funds for her favorite charities.

== Personal life ==
She attracted the attention of Cornelius Vanderbilt Whitney and they married in 1941. They had one son:

- Cornelius Searle Whitney (1944-2015)

The marriage ended in 1957, and she resumed her singing career. In 1975, she married Texas oilman Leonard Franklin "Mac" McCollum, President of Continental Oil Company, a predecessor of ConocoPhillips. They remain married until his death in 1993.

She died August 12, 2002, at the age of 94 following a stroke.
