= On Trust =

American Thoroughbred racehorse

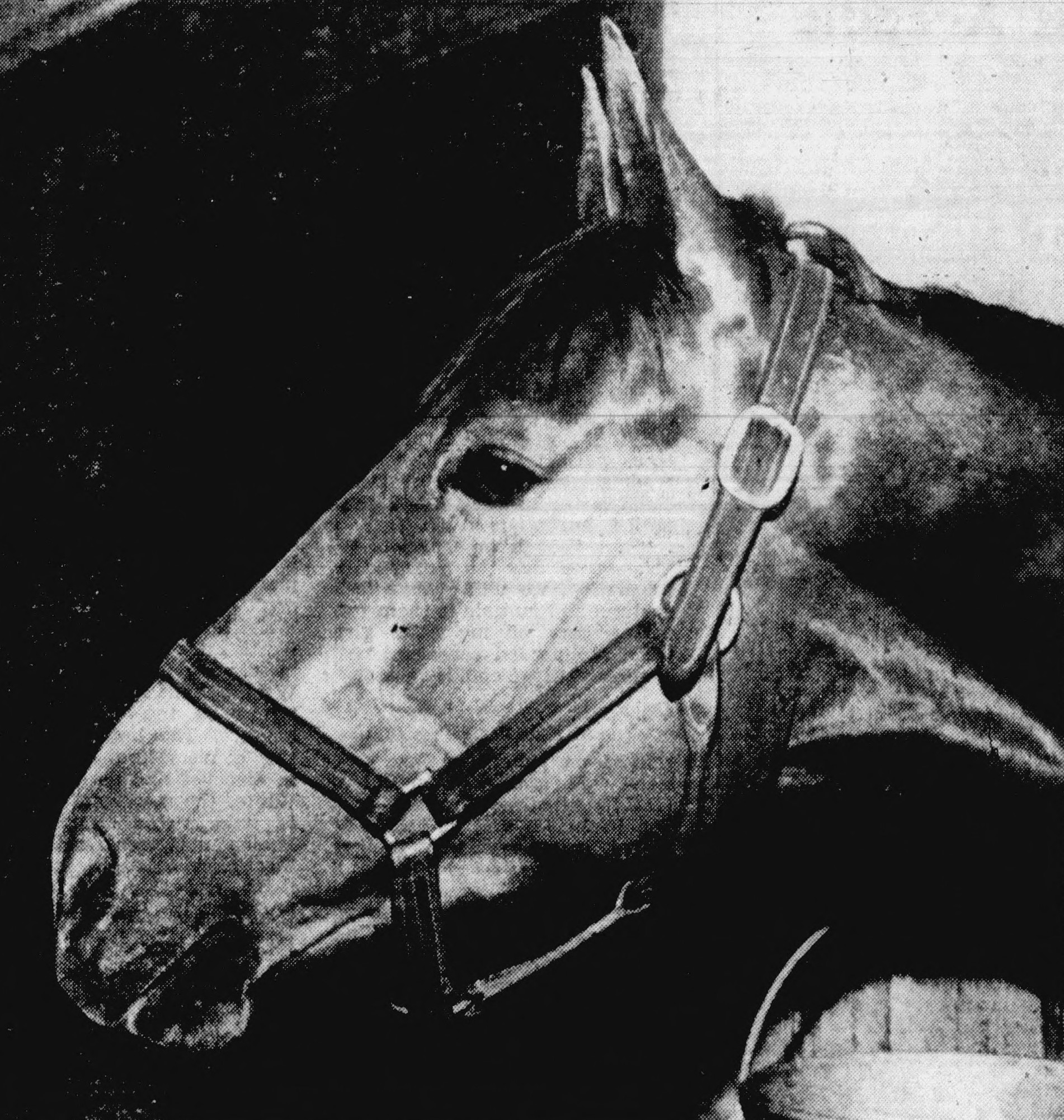
- On Trust, circa 1949
- Sire: Alibhai
- Grandsire: Hyperion
- Dam: Torch Rose
- Damsire: Torchilla
- Sex: Stallion
- Foaled: 1944
- Country: United States
- Colour: Chestnut
- Breeder: Louis B. Mayer
- Owner: Earl O. Stice & Sons
- Trainer: William Molter
- Record: 88: 23-19-13
- Earnings: US$554,145

Major wins
- California Homebred Stakes (1946); Santa Anita Derby (1947); Will Rogers Stakes (1947); Santa Maria Handicap (1947); Golden State Breeders' Handicap (1948, 1949); Santa Catalina Handicap (1948); San Francisco Handicap (1950)

On Trust (foaled 1944 in California) was an American Thoroughbred racehorse whom the Bridgeport, Connecticut, Sunday Herald called "one of the most distinguished and durable performers to come out of the state of California." His dam was Torch Rose and his sire was Alibhai, a British stallion who was imported by MGM Studios boss Louis B. Mayer to the United States to stand at his stud farm in Perris, California. On Trust was bred by Mayer, who raced him mid-way through his 1946 racing campaign, then sold the two-year-old to Earl Stice and his sons Rod and Gary, businessmen from Eagle Rock.

Trained by future U.S. Racing Hall of Fame inductee William Molter, On Trust earned his only win at age two in the California Homebred Stakes at Bay Meadows Racetrack.

== Triple Crown races ==
When On Trust was three, Ralph Neves rode him to a victory in February 1947 Santa Maria Handicap that put him on the path to that year's U.S. Triple Crown series. Following his win in the most prestigious race for three-year-olds on the West Coast, the Santa Anita Derby, On Trust was sent off as the bettors second choice in the Kentucky Derby but finished fourth to Jet Pilot in the 1947 Kentucky Derby and second to Faultless in the Preakness Stakes. He did not run in the third leg of the Triple Crown, the Belmont Stakes.

On Trust continued to compete at top levels into age six in 1950, a year when he equaled the Tanforan Racetrack track record of 1:50 3/5 for a mile and an eighth on dirt.

== Stud record ==
On Trust retired from racing in January 1951 as California's leading money winner and sixth of all time in the United States. He was sent to stud duty at the Circle J. R. Ranch near Corona, California. He met with only limited success as a sire. Perhaps the best runner among his progeny was Trackmaster, winner of the 1955 California Derby and 1956 Santa Anita Maturity.

Pedigree of On Trust
Sire Alibhai	Hyperion	Gainsborough	Bayardo
Sire Alibhai	Hyperion	Gainsborough	Rosedrop
Sire Alibhai	Hyperion	Selene	Chaucer
Sire Alibhai	Hyperion	Selene	Serenissima
Sire Alibhai	Teresina	Tracery	Rock Sand
Sire Alibhai	Teresina	Tracery	Topiary
Sire Alibhai	Teresina	Blue Tit	Wildfowler
Sire Alibhai	Teresina	Blue Tit	Petit Bleu
Dam Torch Rose	Torchilla	Torchbearer	Radium
Dam Torch Rose	Torchilla	Torchbearer	Hackler's Pride
Dam Torch Rose	Torchilla	Chilla	Alvescot
Dam Torch Rose	Torchilla	Chilla	Sunlight
Dam Torch Rose	May Steil	Tchad	Negofol
Dam Torch Rose	May Steil	Tchad	Toia
Dam Torch Rose	May Steil	Beautiful Girl	Marchmont
Dam Torch Rose	May Steil	Beautiful Girl	Tokalaon
