= Sol Rutchick =

American horse trainer

Personal information
- Born: April 27, 1899 Russia
- Died: October 18, 1965 (aged 66) Queens, New York City, New York
- Occupation: Trainer

Horse racing career
- Sport: Horse racing

Major racing wins
- Hialeah Inaugural Handicap (1942); Saylesville purse (1942); Dry Moon Handicap (1942); Gallant Fox Handicap (1943); Jersey Derby (1943); Sunderland Handicap (1943); Travers Stakes (1943); Edgemere Handicap (1944); Daingerfield Handicap (1945, 1947); Questionnaire Handicap (1945); Wood Memorial Stakes (1952); Fashion Stakes (1956); Polly Drummond Stakes (1956); Schuylerville Stakes (1956); Test Stakes (1957); Gravesend Handicap (1960); Top Flight Handicap (1962) American Classics wins: Kentucky Derby (1951)

Significant horses
- Count Turf, Master Fiddle, Count Flame, Eurasian, Miss Blue Jay

Sol Rutchick (April 27, 1899 – October 18, 1965) was an American Thoroughbred racehorse trainer. He was the trainer of the winning horse Count Turf in the 1951 Kentucky Derby.

A native of Russia, at age 12 Rutchick emigrated to the United States.
