= Grand Union Hotel Stakes =

- Class: Discontinued stakes
- Location: Saratoga Race Course; Saratoga Springs, New York
- Inaugurated: c.1865
- Race type: Thoroughbred - Flat racing
- Website: www.nyra.com/index_saratoga.html

Race information
- Distance: 6 furlongs
- Surface: Dirt
- Track: left-handed
- Qualification: Two-year-olds
- Weight: Assigned

The Grand Union Hotel Stakes was an American Thoroughbred horse race run at Saratoga Race Course in Saratoga Springs, New York. A sprint race, it was open to two-year-old horses and run on dirt over a distance of six furlongs.

The Grand Union Hotel Stakes was last run in 1958.

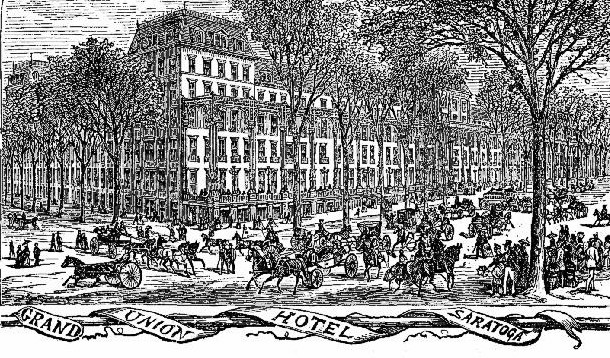
The Grand Union Hotel c.1870

The Grand Union Hotel was a luxury hotel in Saratoga Springs that by 1870 was the largest hotel in the world. It was the meeting place for Saratoga Race Course officials and where the wealthy elite stayed during the racing season.

The Grand Union Hotel Stakes was won by several U.S. Racing Hall of Fame horses including Colin, Man o' War, Zev, Tom Fool, Native Dancer and Nashua. When Man o' War won in 1919, the purse was $10,000.

== Partial list of past winners ==
- 1958 - First Minister
- 1957 - Jimmer
- 1956 - Cohoes
- 1955 - Career Boy
- 1954 - Nashua
- 1953 - Artismo
- 1952 - Native Dancer
- 1951 - Tom Fool
- 1950 - Battle Morn
- 1949 - Suleiman
- 1948 - Magic Words
- 1947 - My Request
- 1946 - Blue Border
- 1945 - Manipur
- 1944 - Pavot
- 1943 - By Jimminy
- 1942 - Devil's Thumb
- 1941 - Shut Out
- 1940 - New World
- 1939 - Epatant
- 1938 - No Competition
- 1937 - Fighting Fox
- 1936 - Maedic
- 1935 - The Fighter
- 1934 - Chance Sun
- 1933 - Roustabout
- 1932 - Ladysman
- 1931 - Lucky Tom
- 1930 - Jamestown
- 1929 - Jim Dandy
- 1928 - Twink
- 1927 - Vito
- 1926 - Kiev
- 1925 - Haste
- 1924 - Sunsard
- 1923 - Big Blaze
- 1922 - Zev
- 1921 - Kai-Sang
- 1920 - Prudery
- 1919 - Man o' War
- 1918 - Sweep On
- 1917 - Sun Briar
- 1916 - Hourless
- 1915 - Puss In Boots
- 1914 - Garbage
- 1913 - Black Broom
- 1912 - NYS racing ban
- 1911 - NYS racing ban
- 1910 - Iron Mask
- 1909 - Chickasaw
- 1908 - Edward
- 1907 - Colin
- 1906 - Penarris
- 1905 - Battleaxe
- 1904 - Siglight
- 1903 - Highball
- 1902 - Grey Friar
- 1901 - King Hanover
- 1897 - Archduke
- 1895 - Hazlet
- 1892 - One
