= Elizabeth Arden =

Canadian-American businesswoman

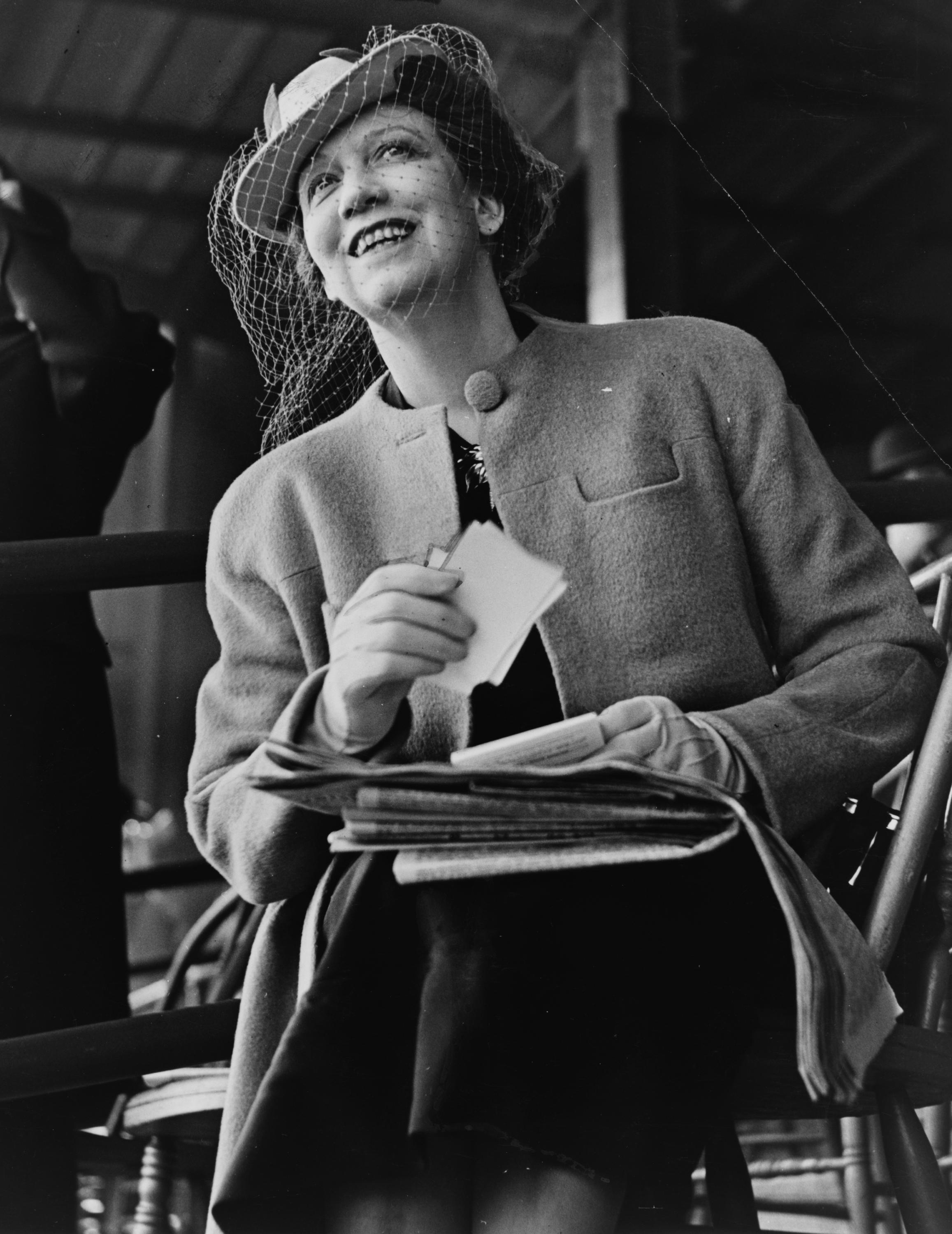
- Arden in 1939
- Born: Florence Nightingale Graham; December 31, 1881; Woodbridge, Ontario, Canada
- Died: October 18, 1966 (aged 84); New York, New York, U.S.
- Resting place: Sleepy Hollow Cemetery, Sleepy Hollow, New York, U.S.
- Other name: Elizabeth N. Graham
- Occupations: Businesswoman (cosmetics); Racehorse owner/breeder
- Spouses: Thomas Jenkins Lewis (m. 1915; div. 1934) Prince Michael Evlanoff (m. 1942; div. 1944)

Elizabeth Arden (December 31, 1881–October 18, 1966), also known as Elizabeth N. Graham, was a Canadian-American businesswoman who founded what is now Elizabeth Arden, Inc., and built a cosmetics empire in the United States.

== Early life ==
Florence Nightingale Graham was born in 1881 (Note: Throughout her life, Florence gave different birth years, but 1881 is the year that is in birth and census records.) on her family's farm in Woodbridge, Ontario, to Willie Graham and Susan Tadd Graham. Her mother was born in Liverpool, England and immigrated to Toronto in about 1863, and her parents married in Toronto in 1872. They had five children: Christine (1873), Lilian (1875), William Jr. (1878), Florence Nightingale (1881), and Jessie Gladys (1884). Her mother died of tuberculosis in 1885.

After dropping out of nursing school in Toronto, she joined her brother in New York City, working briefly as a bookkeeper for the E. R. Squibb pharmaceutical company. While there, Arden spent hours in their lab, learning about skincare. She then worked for Eleanor Adair, an early beauty culturist, as a "treatment girl."

Arden was allegedly a dedicated suffragette, and there is a story that she marched for women's rights in 1912. It is a popular fiction that she supplied the marchers with red lipstick as a sign of solidarity, but there is little contemporary evidence supporting this. Women taking part in the 1912 march were advised to wear the same $7 straw hat, wear white, and bring their children to demonstrate their responsibility and simplicity. The use of cosmetics was never mentioned, which is hardly surprising: bold red lipstick still had tawdry associations with the theatre. Even as late as 1920, Arden herself was dismissive of "powder and rouge ... so obvious in their artifice that their use was considered in questionable taste".

== Career ==
In 1909, Arden formed a partnership with Elizabeth Hubbard, another culturist. The business relationship dissolved in 1910. Wanting to have a trade name, she used "Elizabeth" to save money on her salon signs. Some biographers say she picked the last name "Arden" from the Tennyson poem Enoch Arden, but at least one suggest that it came from reading eulogies for railroad baron E.H. Harriman who died in 1909, was interested in horses (as she was), and had a nearby estate named Arden. Her salons were originally named Salon d'Oro, each with a trademark signature red door for which they were later named.

In 1912, Arden traveled to France to learn beauty and facial massage techniques used in the Parisian beauty salons. She returned with a collection of rouges and tinted powders that she had created. She began expanding her international operations in 1915 and started opening salons across the world. In 1934, she opened the Maine Chance residential spa in Rome, Maine, the first destination beauty spa in the United States. It operated until 1970.

Arden was largely responsible for establishing makeup as proper and appropriate, even necessary, for a ladylike image; previously makeup had often been associated with lower classes and prostitutes. She targeted middle-aged and plain women for whom beauty products promised a youthful, beautiful image. In her salons and through her marketing campaigns, she stressed teaching women how to apply makeup and pioneered such concepts as scientific formulation of cosmetics, beauty makeovers, and coordinating colors of eye, lip and facial makeup.

In 1962, the French government awarded Arden the Légion d'Honneur, in recognition of her contribution to the cosmetics industry.

== Horse racing ==
Arden was involved in the sport of Thoroughbred racing for many years. Her stable, Maine Chance Farm (named for her spa), owned – among other stakes winners – the 1947 Kentucky Derby winner, Jet Pilot.

== Personal life and death ==
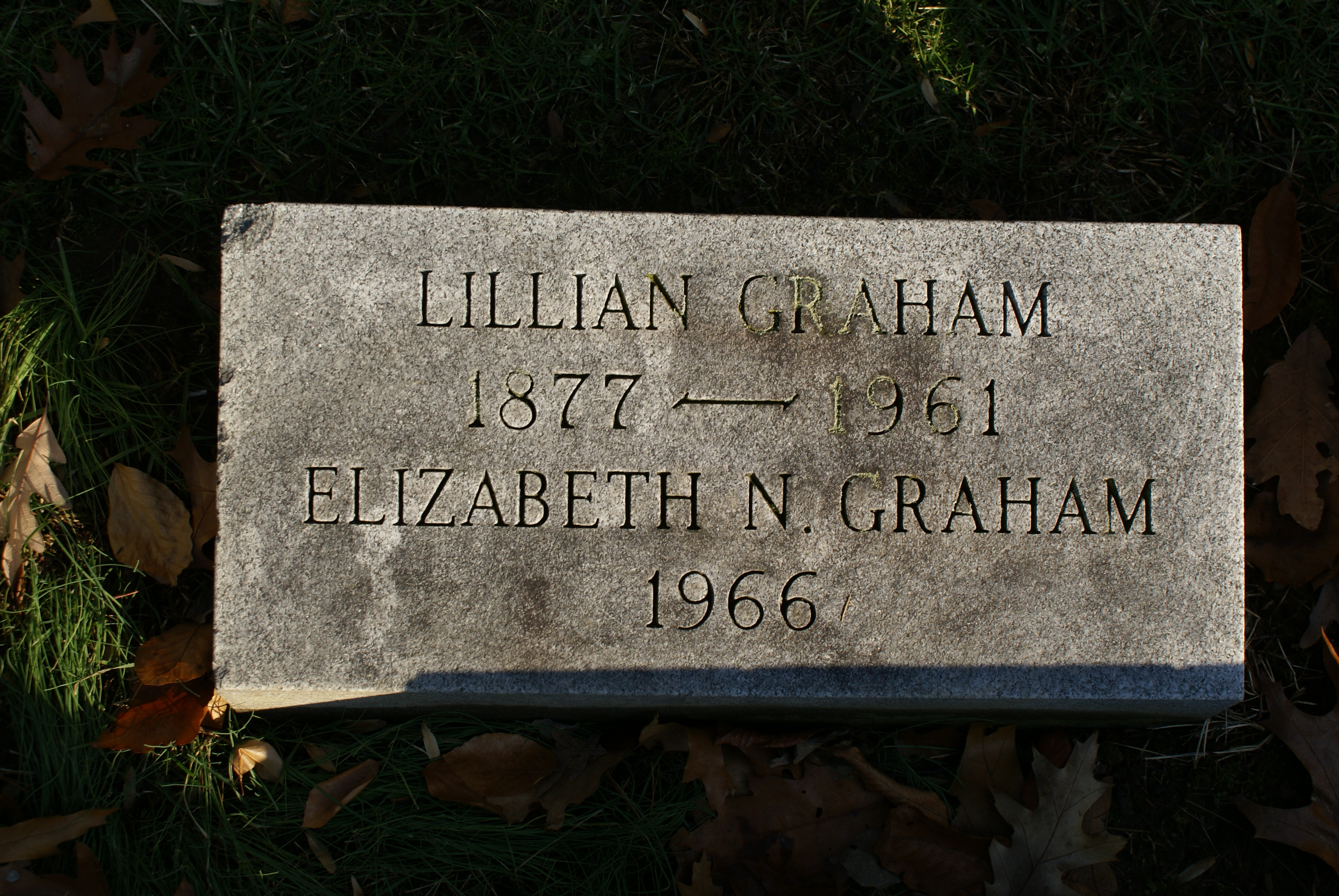
The footstone of Elizabeth Arden (listed as Elizabeth N. Graham)

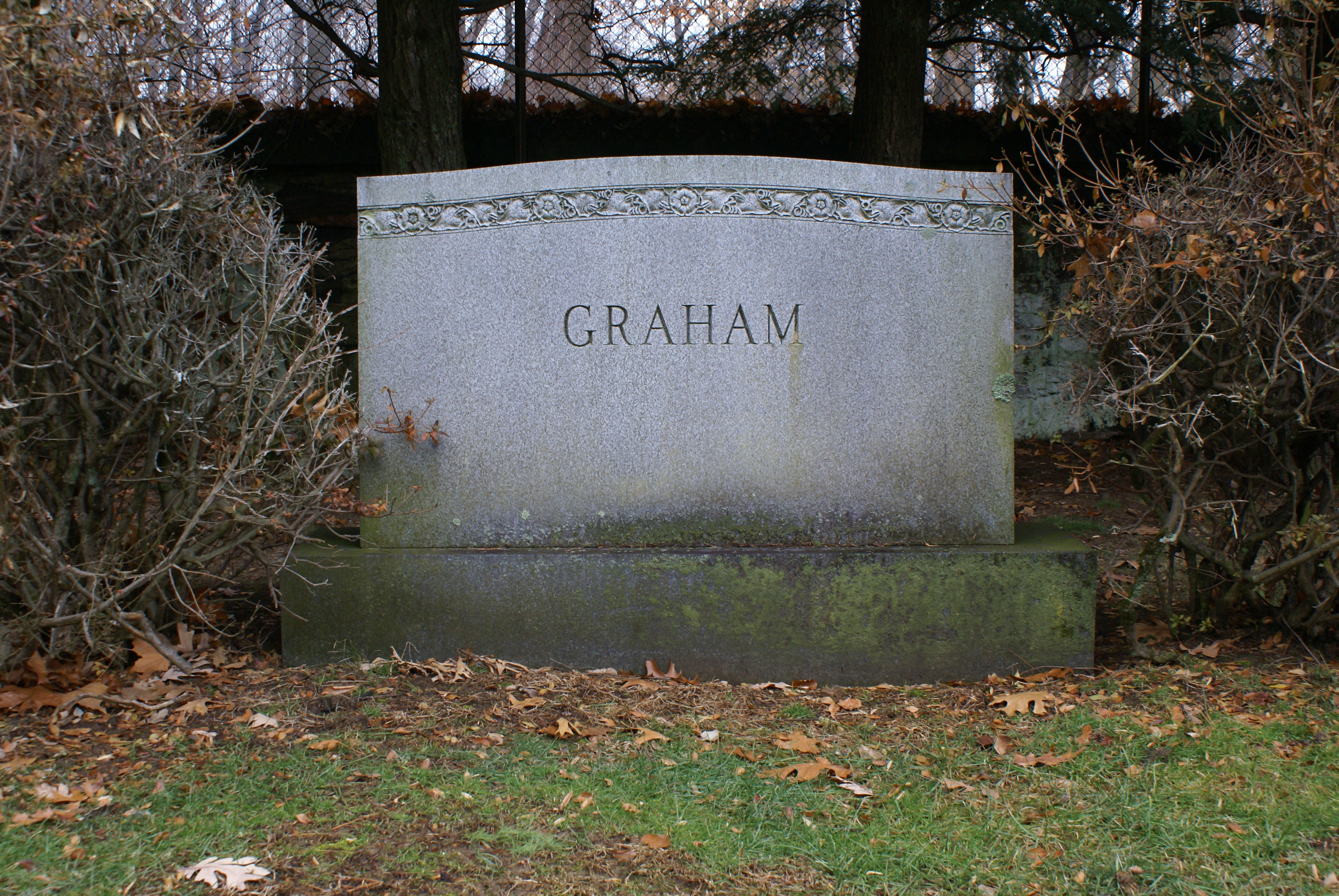
The headstone of Elizabeth Arden in Sleepy Hollow Cemetery (under the family name of Graham)

After Florence Graham chose the trade name Elizabeth Arden for her business, she began using a combination of names, sometimes depending on context: she signed her letters "Elizabeth Graham" or "Elizabeth Arden;" when involved with her racehorse she went by "Mrs. Elizabeth Graham" and her stables were called "Mr. Nightingale;" with both husbands, she went by their last name while married and stopped using their names after divorce.

In 1915, she married Thomas Jenkins Lewis, an American banker. Because of this marriage, she acquired American citizenship. While they were married, Lewis headed the wholesale division of her company, tried to take over the company, and had affairs with several women in the company. They divorced in 1934. Although one obituary says Lewis continued to work at the Elizabeth Arden company after the divorce, most other sources agree that his position ended when the marriage did, and he went to work for a competitor.

In 1942, she married Michael Evlanoff. He was a Russian immigrant who presented himself as a prince with an income from a trust set up in the name of Alfred Nobel. Their marriage was troubled, and brief: he invited his boyfriend to their honeymoon; he lived extravagantly and expected her to pay his bills explaining his trust payments were delayed; and a private detective learned his royal title was a fake. She divorced him in 1944 and changed her last name to again be Graham.

Arden died at Lenox Hill Hospital in Manhattan on October 18, 1966. She was interred in the Sleepy Hollow Cemetery in Sleepy Hollow, New York, under the name Elizabeth N. Graham.

== In popular culture ==
The musical War Paint dramatizes her rivalry with competitor Helena Rubinstein. After a successful tryout at Chicago's Goodman Theater, the show opened on Broadway at the Nederlander Theatre on April 6, 2017, earning four Tony Award nominations, including Best Actress in a Leading Role for Christine Ebersole's portrayal of Arden, as well as for Patti Lupone for her role as Rubinstein. and closed on November 5, 2017.

The comedy Lip Service by the Australian dramatist John Misto chronicles the life and career of Helena Rubinstein and her rivalry with Elizabeth Arden and Revlon. Lip Service premiered April 26, 2017, at the Park Theatre in London, under the title Madame Rubinstein, before opening at Sydney's Ensemble Theatre in August of the same year.

Elizabeth Arden, as student nurse Florence Nightingale Graham, appeared in an episode of the CBC period drama Murdoch Mysteries (October 1, 2018), portrayed by Kathryn Alexandre.

A contract dispute that Arden faced with a former employee led the 1953 court case Crabtree v. Elizabeth Arden Sales Corp, which is now considered a seminal case on the application of the statute of frauds. The case is frequently included in contract law casebooks and courses.

On the children’s show, Sesame Street, Arden was spoofed as Elizablecccch Arden, a famous Grouch beautician who visits Grundgetta’s Grouch Beauty Salon, run by Oscar the Grouch’s girlfriend, Grundgetta, to get a Grouch makeover.
