= Whitney Laboratory for Marine Bioscience =

Research and teaching facility

Coordinates: 29.6474°N 82.3450°W

Whitney Marine Lab
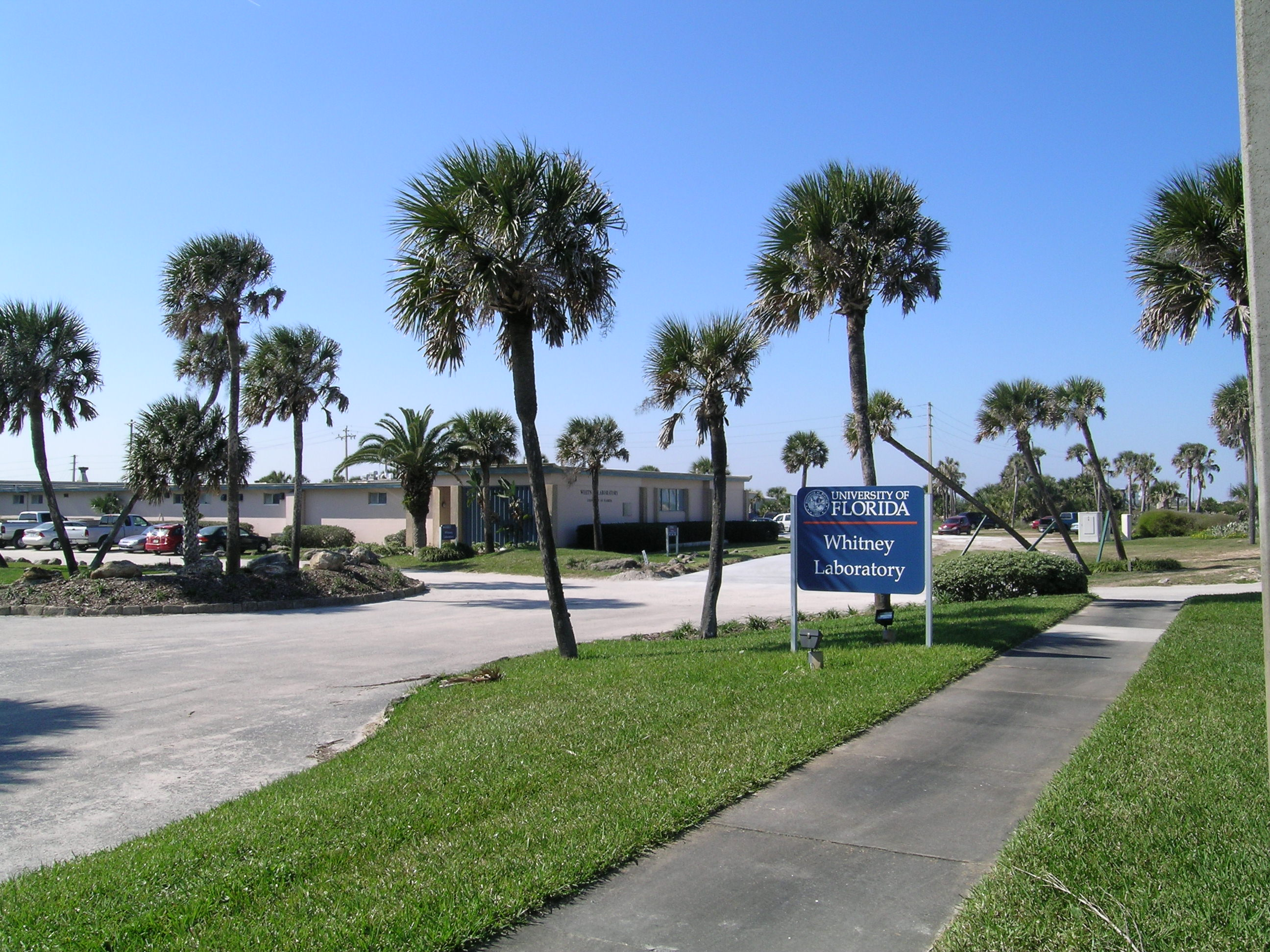
- The lab off of Florida State Road A1A.
- Established: 1974
- Location: Saint Augustine, Florida, USA
- Website: Official website

The Whitney Laboratory for Marine Bioscience or Whitney Marine Lab at the University of Florida is a research and teaching facility, that conducts research pertaining to Marine Bioscience.

The Marine lab can be traced back to the benefactor Cornelius Vanderbilt Whitney, who donated numerous acres to the University of Florida so that a site could be used. It was the intention of this benefactor to study the natural history of marine animals. Whitney paid a large share of the construction costs, and the Laboratory officially opened on January 30, 1974. In the years that followed an additional building, named Whitney Hall, containing dormitory rooms, conference centers, and apartments were constructed with funds provided primarily by Cornelius and Marylou Whitney.

== See also ==
- University of Florida
- Cornelius Vanderbilt Whitney
- University of Florida College of Liberal Arts and Sciences
