= Jack Dempsey's Broadway Restaurant =

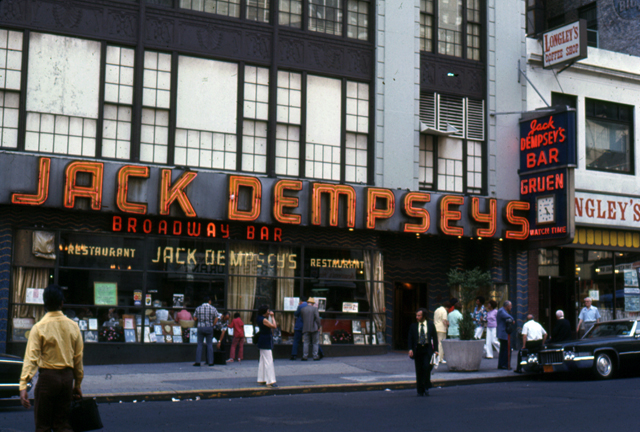
- Jack Dempsey's Broadway Restaurant, New York City, early 1970s
- Interactive map of Jack Dempsey's Broadway Restaurant

Restaurant information
- Established: 1935
- Closed: 1974
- Location: New York City, New York, United States
- Coordinates: 40°45′40.5″N 73°59′4″W

Jack Dempsey's Broadway Restaurant, known popularly as Jack Dempsey's, was a restaurant located in the Brill Building on Broadway between 49th Street and 50th Streets in Manhattan, New York City.

Owned by world heavyweight boxing champion Jack Dempsey, the restaurant originally opened for business as Jack Dempsey's Restaurant on Eighth Avenue and 50th Street, directly across from the third Madison Square Garden, in 1935. Most nights would find Dempsey's famous proprietor on hand to greet guests, sign autographs, pose for pictures, and hold court with people from all walks of life.

It was next door to Jack J. Amiel's Turf Restaurant on Times Square. Amiel became famous as the owner of the "underdog" horse Count Turf who won the 1951 Kentucky Derby. A few years after his Derby win, Amiel became a co-owner of Jack Dempsey's Restaurant.

A favorite attraction of the restaurant was its famous cheesecake. In a letter to New York in 1973, Dempsey wrote, "Jack Dempsey's cheesecake has been in existence for almost 40 years. And in New York it is an institution in itself. It is baked on our premises, eaten in our restaurant, as well as airmailed all over the United States and Europe. We have had requests for our cheesecake from tourists who come to New York from faraway places; we've fulfilled requests over the years from France's late President Charles DeGaulle, who had his cheesecakes sent several times a year."

The restaurant closed in 1974.

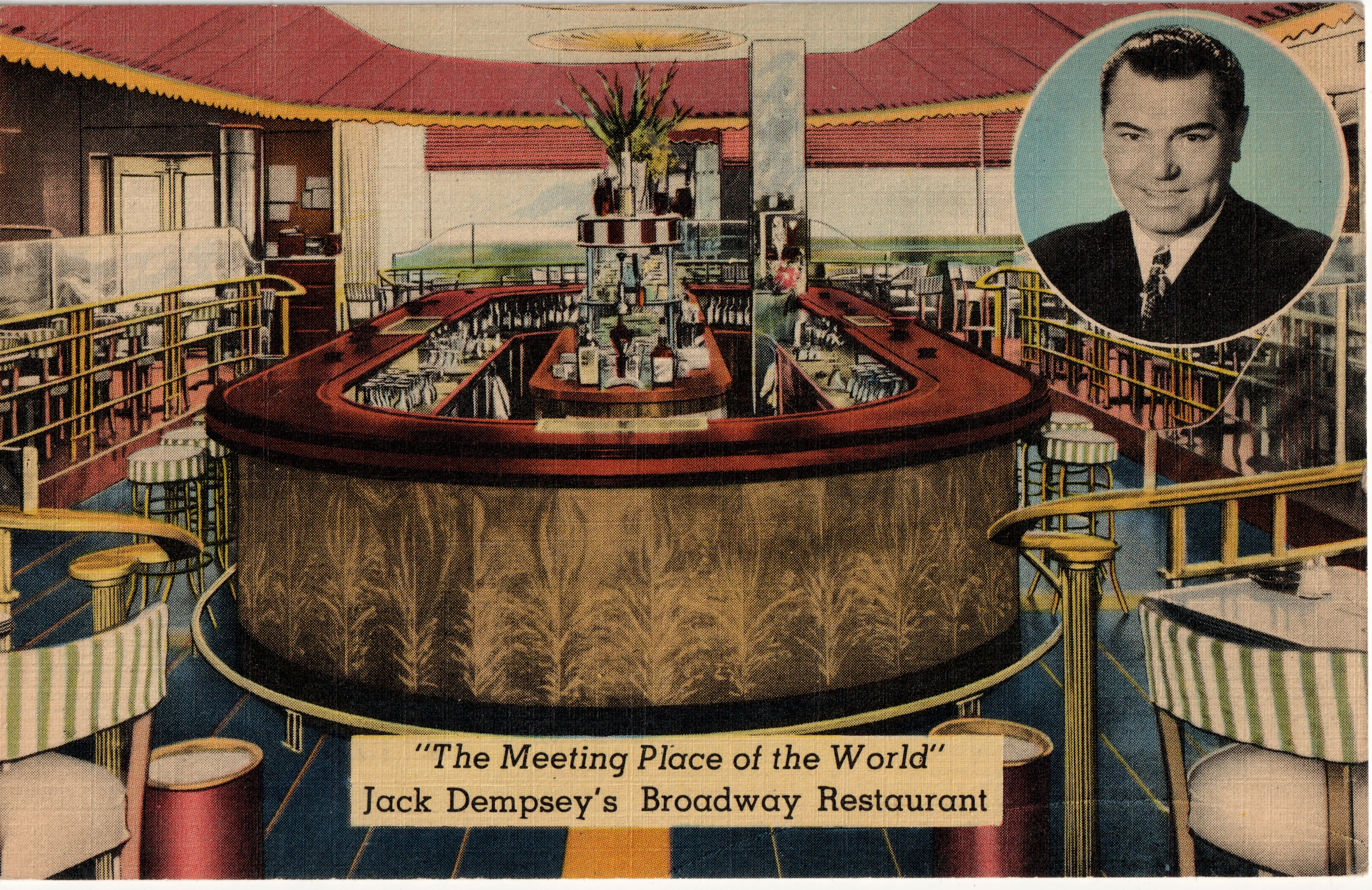
Jack Dempsey's Broadway Restaurant bar on a promotional postcard

== In popular culture ==
- In the 1962 film version of Requiem for a Heavyweight, Jack Dempsey's is where Maish takes Mountain to get him inebriated before his job interview. Jack Dempsey does a cameo as himself in this scene.
- In the 1972 film The Godfather, the restaurant is named then shown as where Michael Corleone is picked up by Sollozzo and Capt. McCluskey.
- The restaurant is one of the settings of Hubert Selby, Jr.'s short story "Hi Champ," which appears in the 1986 book Song of the Silent Snow
- The restaurant is mentioned, as background, three times in E. L. Doctorow's 1989 novel Billy Bathgate.
- The restaurant is mentioned in Blue Bloods, season 2 episode 5 "A night on the town".
- The restaurant appears during the opening scenes of the 1993 film A Bronx Tale.
- It can be seen in back projected stock footage of Gotham City in the 1966 television version of Batman.
- In season 1, episode 6 of The Odd Couple television series, "Oscar's Ulcer" (originally aired October 29, 1970), Oscar Madison is seen going into the restaurant.
