= Ladysman =

American-bred Thoroughbred racehorse

- Sire: Pompey
- Grandsire: Sun Briar
- Dam: Lady Belle
- Damsire: Polymelian
- Sex: Stallion
- Foaled: 1930
- Country: United States
- Colour: Chestnut
- Breeder: William R. Coe
- Owner: William R. Coe
- Trainer: Joseph H. "Bud" Stotler
- Record: 22: 8-4-3
- Earnings: US$134,310

Major wins
- Hopeful Stakes (1932); Grand Union Hotel Stakes (1932); United States Hotel Stakes (1932); Arlington Futurity (1932); Suburban Handicap (1934) American Classic Race placing: Preakness Stakes 2nd (1933)

Awards
- United States Champion 2 yr-old Colt

Ladysman (foaled 1930) was an American Thoroughbred racehorse who was the son of Pompey who was the winner of the 1925 Hopeful Stakes as a two-year-old and the prestigious Suburban Handicap as a four-year-old. He is best remembered for his runner-up performance to Head Play in the 1933 Preakness Stakes.

== Two-year-old season ==
In 1932, Ladysman won the Arlington Futurity at Arlington Park in Chicago, Illinois in July and then shipped to Saratoga Race Course in August and September. He started off the meet with a win in Grand Union Hotel Stakes at six furlongs and then won the United States Hotel Stakes at six furlongs. In his next race, he placed second in the Saratoga Special Stakes at six and half furlongs. In his next start, he won the seven furlong Hopeful Stakes, beating Sun Archer by two lengths to establish himself as the season's leading juvenile colt. In September, he placed second in the Futurity Stakes at Belmont Park. Ladysman was voted 1932 United States Champion 2 yr-old Colt.

== Three-year-old season ==
In 1933, owner William R. Coe rested Ladysman during the winter and into the spring. His first race of the year was the Kentucky Derby at Churchill Downs on the first Saturday of May. In the Derby, he started favorite but finished fourth behind Brokers Tip and Head Play.

His trainer, Bud Stotler, convinced the owner that Ladysman needed that race and decided to run him in the second jewel of the Triple Crown, the Preakness Stakes at Pimlico Race Course in Baltimore, Maryland. Ladysman was made the second choice in a field of ten stakes winners at odds of 3:1 in the "Run for the Black-Eyed Susans". He broke from gate three and settled into a stalking position of third behind favorite Head Play, who led gate to wire in solid fractions of :23-3/5 and :48 flat for the first quarter and half mile. Around the final turn, Ladysman held off several challenges and passed De Valera for second. He finished four lengths short of first and withstood the rush of Utopian to place by a head. The Derby winner lacked speed and faded to last out of ten.

== Later career ==
In 1934, Ladysman scored his biggest victory in the Suburban Handicap at Belmont Park. He also showed with third-place finishes in both the Stars and Stripes Handicap at Arlington Park and the Metropolitan Handicap at Belmont. As a five-year-old, he ran second in The Big Cap at Santa Anita Park and third in the San Juan Capistrano Handicap in 1935. As a six-year-old, he began stud duty and stood at Almahurst Farm in Kentucky.

== Pedigree ==
Pedigree of Ladysman, chestnut colt, 1930
Sire Pompey	Sun Briar	Sundridge*^	Amphion
Sire Pompey	Sun Briar	Sundridge*^	Sierra
Sire Pompey	Sun Briar	Sweet Briar	St Frusquin
Sire Pompey	Sun Briar	Sweet Briar	Presentation
Sire Pompey	Cleopatra	Corcyra	Polymelus*
Sire Pompey	Cleopatra	Corcyra	Pearmain
Sire Pompey	Cleopatra	Gallice	Gallinule
Sire Pompey	Cleopatra	Gallice	St Cecilia
Dam Lady Belle	Polymelian	Polymelus*	Cyllene
Dam Lady Belle	Polymelian	Polymelus*	Maid Marian
Dam Lady Belle	Polymelian	Pasquita	Sundridge*
Dam Lady Belle	Polymelian	Pasquita	Pasquil
Dam Lady Belle	La Grande Armee	Verdun	Rabelais
Dam Lady Belle	La Grande Armee	Verdun	Vellena
Dam Lady Belle	La Grande Armee	Mary the Second	William the Third
Dam Lady Belle	La Grande Armee	Mary the Second	Ellaline (family: 7-f)

* Ladysman is inbred 3S x 4D to the stallion Sundridge, meaning that he appears third generation on the sire side of his pedigree and fourth generation on the dam side of his pedigree.

* Ladysman is inbred 4S x 3D to the stallion Polymelus, meaning that he appears fourth generation on the sire side of his pedigree and third generation on the dam side of his pedigree.
