= 1951 Kentucky Derby =

Horse race

77th Kentucky Derby
- Kentucky Derby
- Grade I stakes race
- Location: Churchill Downs
- Date: May 5, 1951
- Winning horse: Count Turf
- Jockey: Conn McCreary
- Trainer: Sol Rutchick
- Owner: Jack Joseph Amiel
- Surface: Dirt

The 1951 Kentucky Derby was the 77th running of the Kentucky Derby. The race took place on May 5, 1951.

== Full results ==
Finished	Pgm	Horse	Jockey	Trainer	Owner	Time / behind
1st	14	Count Turf	Conn McCreary	Sol Rutchick	Jack Joseph Amiel	
2nd	4a	Royal Mustang	Paul J. Bailey	Joe Jansen	Sam E. Wilson Jr.	
3rd	9	Ruhe	Job Dean Jessop	Robert V. McGarvey	Jean Denemark	
4th	16	Phil D.	Raymond York	James D. Jordan	W. Clyde Martin	
5th	7	Fanfare	Steve Brooks	Ben A. Jones	Calumet Farm	
6th	10	Battle Morn	Eddie Arcaro	Moody Jolley	Cain Hoy Stable	
7th	2	Anyoldtime	Robert L. Baird	Eldred C. Dobson	William M. Peavey	
8th	17	Pur Sang	John H. Adams	John Zoeller	Springbrook Farm	
9th	5a	Hall of Fame	Ted Atkinson	John M. Gaver Sr.	Greentree Stable	
10th	6	Timely Reward	James Stout	George M. Odom	Helene D. Gilroy	
11th	3	Counterpoint	David Gorman	Sylvester Veitch	Cornelius Vanderbilt Whitney	
12th	11	Repetoire	Pete McLean	Albert Jensen	Stanley C. & Nora A. Mikell Sr.	
13th	15	King Clover	Frank Bone	Edion H. Gaines	Cary C. Boshamer	
14th	8	Sonic	William Boland	Max Hirsch	King Ranch	
15th	2c	Sir Bee Bum	Darrell Madden	Eldred C. Dobson	William M. Peavey	
16th	1a	Snuzzle	Gerald Porch	Joe D. Puckett	Brown Hotel Stable (J. Graham Brown)	
17th	13	Fighting Back	Willie Lee Johnson	Odie Clelland	Murlogg Farm (Mrs. R. J. Murphy & Susan Kellogg)	
18th	5	Big Stretch	Douglas Dodson	John M. Gaver Sr.	Greentree Stable	
19th	4	Golden Birch	Charles Swain	Joe Jansen	Sam E. Wilson Jr.	
20th	3x	Mameluke	Raymond Adair	Sylvester Veitch	Cornelius Vanderbilt Whitney	
