= 1947 Currie Cup =

Domestic rugby union competition

- Countries: South Africa
- Champions: Western Province (17th title)
- Runners-up: Transvaal

The 1947 Currie Cup was the 22nd edition of the Currie Cup, the premier domestic rugby union competition in South Africa.

The tournament was won by Western Province for the 17th time; they beat Transvaal 16–12 in the final in Cape Town.

== See also ==
- Currie Cup
