= Sun Briar =

French-bred Thoroughbred racehorse

- Sun Briar at Court Manor Stud
- Sire: Sundridge
- Grandsire: Amphion
- Dam: Sweet Briar
- Damsire: St. Frusquin
- Sex: Stallion
- Foaled: 1915
- Country: France
- Colour: Bay
- Breeder: Marcel Boussac
- Owner: Willis Sharpe Kilmer
- Trainer: Henry McDaniel
- Record: 22: 8-4-5
- Earnings: $74,355

Major wins
- Great American Stakes (1917); Saratoga Special Stakes (1917); Grand Union Hotel Stakes (1917); Albany Handicap (1917); Hopeful Stakes (1917); Travers Stakes (1918); Delaware Handicap (1918); Champlain Handicap (1919)

Awards
- American Champion Two-Year-Old Colt (1917); American Champion Older Male Horse (1919)

Sun Briar (foaled 1915 in France) was a Thoroughbred racehorse retrospectively named the American Champion Two-Year-Old Colt of 1917 and the American Champion Older Male Horse of 1919 by writers from The Blood-Horse magazine. He was a son of Sundridge, the 1911 Champion sire in Great Britain who also sired Epsom Derby winner Sunstar. Sun Briar was out of the mare Sweet Briar, the daughter of St. Frusquin, a multiple winner of top-level races including the 1896 British Classic and the 2,000 Guineas Stakes. St. Frusquin was also a leading sire in Great Britain and Ireland in 1903 and the Leading broodmare sire in Great Britain & Ireland in 1924.

== Career ==
=== Two-year-old season ===
Sun Briar was sent from France to the 1916 Saratoga yearling auction by American bloodstock agent Delbert Reiff, where he was purchased for $6,000 by businessman Willis Sharpe Kilmer. Trained by future Hall of Fame inductee Henry McDaniel, in his Champion two-year-old season, the colt won five of his nine starts, including the 1917 Saratoga Special and Hopeful Stakes.

=== Three-year-old season ===
Not training well in the spring of 1918, Sun Briar did not run in the Kentucky Derby but by mid summer was in peak form. Under regular rider Willie Knapp, he set a North American record of 1:36 1/5 for one mile on dirt over an oval track while winning the Delaware Handicap. Less than two weeks later, Knapp and Sun Briar won the prestigious Travers Stakes in which he set a new stakes record for a mile and a quarter on dirt. In a September 1918 race against the clock at Saratoga, Sun Briar ran a mile in 1:34 flat.

=== Four-year-old season ===
Sun Briar came back to race in 1919 after a layoff in the spring, during which time he stood at stud and serviced eighteen mares before returning to race training. He won the 1919 Champlain Handicap, breaking a Saratoga Race Course track record that had stood for fifteen years. His time of 1:50 flat for a mile and a furlong stood for thirty-seven years until 1956, when Dedicate beat it by 1/5 of a second.

== Stud career ==
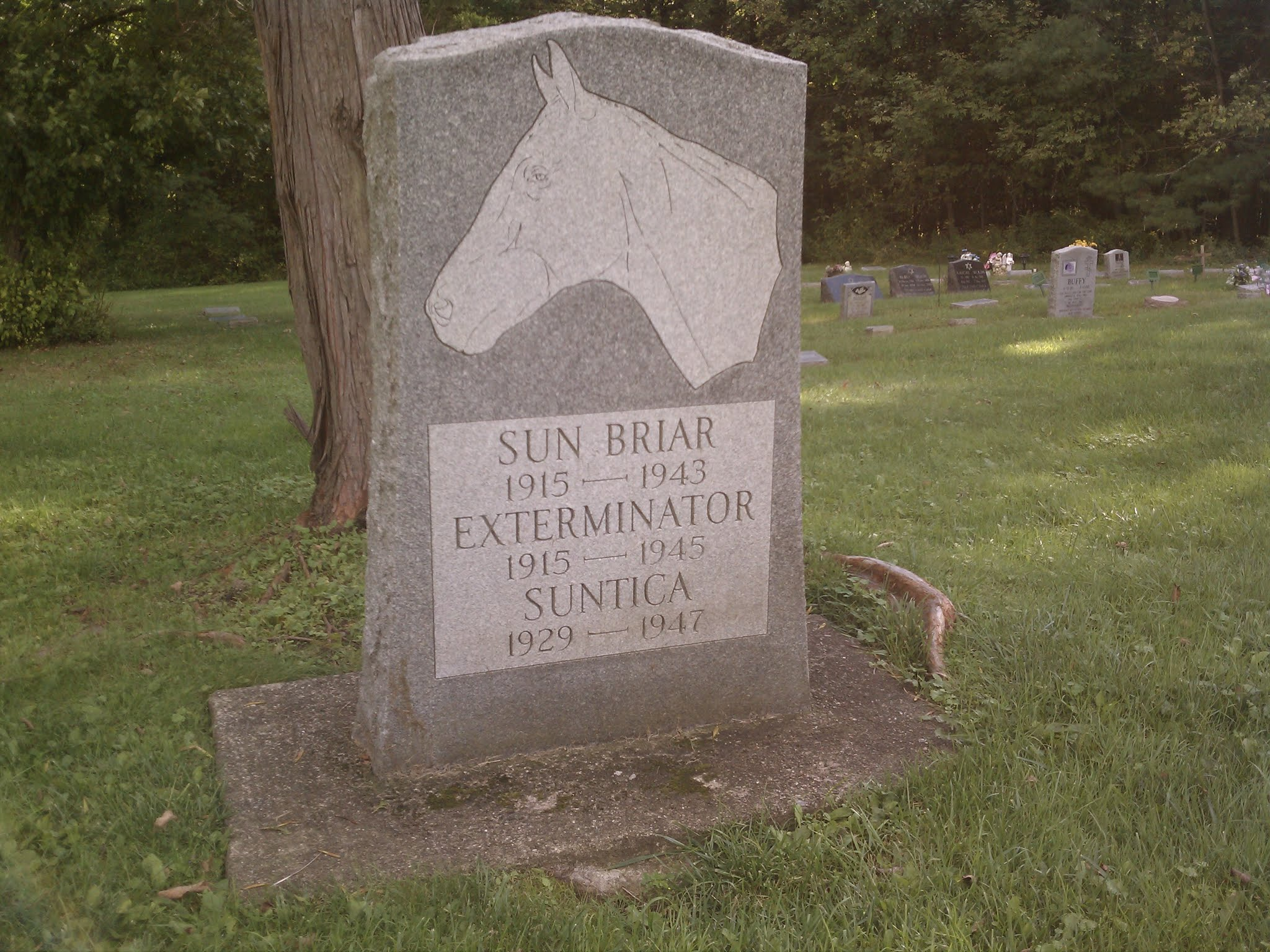
Sun Briar's grave at Whispering Pines Pet Cemetery in Binghamton, NY

Retired after his 1919 racing campaign, Sun Briar served stud duty at Kilmer's Court Manor Stud in New Market, Virginia. A successful sire, he produced U. S. Racing Hall of Fame inductee and three-time American Champion Older Male Horse Sun Beau and 1925 U. S. Champion 2-year-old colt Pompey. Among Sun Briar's other successful runners, his son Firethorn won the 1935 and 1937 Jockey Club Gold Cup and the 1936 Suburban Handicap. Sun Egret was a winner of twenty-four races including the 1938 San Pasqual and San Vicente Handicaps plus the 1939 and 1940 Harford Handicap.

On his death, Sun Briar was buried at Kilmer's Sun Briar Court in Binghamton, New York, where he shares his gravestone with the fellow Kilmer-owned and -raced horses Exterminator (1915–1945) and the mare Suntica (1929–1947).

== Sire line tree ==
- Sun Briar
  - Sun Flag
  - Pompey
    - Osculator
      - Siete Leguas
    - Caesars Ghost
    - Ladysman
    - Pompoon
    - Strobo
    - Rippey
  - Sun Beau
  - Sun Edwin
  - Sun Craig
    - Shepperton
  - Firethorn
    - Pukka Gin
  - Sun Egret

== Pedigree ==
Pedigree of Sun Briar
| Sire Sundridge | Amphion | Speculum or Roseberry | Vedette or Speculum |
| Sire Sundridge | Amphion | Speculum or Roseberry | Doralice or Ladylike |
| Sire Sundridge | Amphion | Suicide | Hermit*^ |
| Sire Sundridge | Amphion | Suicide | The Ratcatcher's Daughter |
| Sire Sundridge | Sierra | Springfield | St Albans |
| Sire Sundridge | Sierra | Springfield | Viridis |
| Sire Sundridge | Sierra | Sanda | Wenlock |
| Sire Sundridge | Sierra | Sanda | Sandal |
| Dam Sweet Briar | St Frusquin | St Simon | Galopin |
| Dam Sweet Briar | St Frusquin | St Simon | St Angela |
| Dam Sweet Briar | St Frusquin | Isabel | Plebeian |
| Dam Sweet Briar | St Frusquin | Isabel | Parma |
| Dam Sweet Briar | Presentation | Orion | Bend Or |
| Dam Sweet Briar | Presentation | Orion | Shotover^ |
| Dam Sweet Briar | Presentation | Dubia | Ayrshire |
| Dam Sweet Briar | Presentation | Dubia | Miss Middlewick |

*^ Sun Briar is inbred 4S x 5D to the stallion Hermit, meaning that he appears fourth generation on the sire side of his pedigree and fifth generation (via Shotover)^ on the dam side of his pedigree.
