= 1946–47 Sheffield Shield season =

Australian cricket tournament

- Cricket format: First-class
- Tournament format: Double round-robin
- Champions: Victoria (17th title)
- Participants: 4
- Matches: 12
- Most runs: Keith Miller (Victoria) (667)
- Most wickets: George Tribe (Victoria) (33)

The 1946–47 Sheffield Shield season was the 45th season of the Sheffield Shield, the domestic first-class cricket competition of Australia. Victoria won the championship following the renewal of the tournament after the suspension imposed by World War II.

== Table ==
Team	Played	Won	1st Inns Won	1st Inns Lost	Lost	Drawn	Points
Victoria	6	5	0	0	0	1	27
New South Wales	6	3	0	1	2	0	16
Queensland	6	0	1	1	4	0	8
South Australia	6	0	1	1	3	1	6

== Statistics ==
=== Most Runs ===
Keith Miller 667

=== Most Wickets ===
George Tribe 33
