= Phalanx (horse) =

American-bred Thoroughbred racehorse

- Sire: Pilate
- Grandsire: Friar Rock
- Dam: Jacola
- Damsire: Jacopo
- Sex: Stallion
- Foaled: 1944
- Country: United States
- Colour: Bay
- Breeder: Abram Stevens Hewitt II
- Owner: Cornelius Vanderbilt Whitney
- Trainer: Sylvester Veitch
- Record: 41: 13-7-10
- Earnings: US$409,275

Major wins
- Remsen Handicap (1946); Wood Memorial Stakes (1947); Dwyer Stakes (1947); Empire City Handicap (1947); Jockey Club Gold Cup (1947); Daingerfield Handicap (1948); American Classic Race wins: Belmont Stakes (1947)

Awards
- American Champion 3-Year-Old Colt (1947)

Phalanx (1944–1971) was an American Champion Thoroughbred racehorse. In 1947, he won the Belmont Stakes and was voted American Champion Three-Year-Old Male Horse.

== Background ==
He was sired by Pilate, a son of the 1916 Belmont Stakes winner, Friar Rock. His dam was the outstanding runner Jacola, the American Champion Two-Year-Old Filly of 1937 who beat Seabiscuit by two lengths in the 1938 Laurel Stakes.

Phalanx was conditioned for racing by future U.S. Racing Hall of Fame trainer Syl Veitch.

== Racing career ==
At age two, Phalanx won the Remsen Handicap. At age three, after winning the Wood Memorial Stakes, he was the betting favorite going into the 1947 Kentucky Derby but ran second to Jet Pilot. and third to Faultless in the Preakness Stakes. In the final leg of the U.S. Triple Crown series, Phalanx won the Belmont Stakes by five lengths. He also won the Dwyer Stakes, the Empire City Handicap and in the fall, the two-mile Jockey Club Gold Cup.

Racing in 1948, Phalanx finished second to Citation in the Jockey Club Gold Cup and in the Empire City International Gold Cup. He did not get his first win of the year until November 6, when he captured the Daingerfield Handicap at Jamaica Race Course carrying top weight of 129 pounds.

== Stud record ==
Retired to owner Sonny Whitney's stud farm in Kentucky, Phalanx notably sired Career Boy, the 1956 American Champion Turf Horse, and Fisherman, a multiple top-level performer whose wins included the Travers Stakes and Washington, D.C. International Stakes.

According to The Jockey Club records, Phalanx sired 165 winners (64.0%) and 16 stakes winners (6.2%) from 258 named foals.

== Pedigree ==
Pedigree of Phalanx
Sire Pilate	Friar Rock	Rock Sand	Sainfoin
Sire Pilate	Friar Rock	Rock Sand	Roquebrune
Sire Pilate	Friar Rock	Fairy Gold	Bend Or
Sire Pilate	Friar Rock	Fairy Gold	Dame Masham
Sire Pilate	Herodias	The Tetrarch	Roi Herode
Sire Pilate	Herodias	The Tetrarch	Vahren
Sire Pilate	Herodias	Honora	Gallinule
Sire Pilate	Herodias	Honora	Word of Honour
Dam Jacola	Jacopo	Sansovino	Swynford
Dam Jacola	Jacopo	Sansovino	Gondolette
Dam Jacola	Jacopo	Black Ray	Black Jester
Dam Jacola	Jacopo	Black Ray	Lady Brilliant
Dam Jacola	La France	Sir Gallahad	Teddy
Dam Jacola	La France	Sir Gallahad	Plucky Liege
Dam Jacola	La France	Flambette	Durbar
Dam Jacola	La France	Flambette	La Flambee
