= Jet Pilot (horse) =

American-bred Thoroughbred racehorse

- Sire: Blenheim
- Grandsire: Blandford
- Dam: Black Wave
- Damsire: Sir Gallahad III
- Sex: Stallion
- Foaled: March 29, 1944
- Country: United States
- Colour: Chestnut
- Breeder: Arthur B. Hancock & Nydrie Stud
- Owner: Maine Chance Farm. Racing silks: Cerise, white sash, blue cuffs on sleeves, cerise cap.
- Trainer: Tom Smith
- Record: 17: 7-3-2
- Earnings: $198,740

Major wins
- Pimlico Nursery Stakes (1946); National Stallion Stakes (1946); Pimlico Futurity (1946); Tremont Stakes (1946); Jamaica Handicap (1947) U.S. Triple Crown series: Kentucky Derby (1947)
- Last updated on March 5, 2007

Jet Pilot (March 29, 1944 – March 3, 1967) was an American Thoroughbred racehorse best known for winning the Kentucky Derby in 1947.

== Background ==
Jet Pilot was sired by the 1930 Epsom Derby winner, Blenheim, out of the mare Black Wave, a daughter of the French-bred sire Sir Gallahad III. Blenheim and Sir Gallahad were both brought to stand at stud in the United States by groups of American horsemen, both of which were led by Arthur B. Hancock of Claiborne Farm. Black Wave's dam Black Curl was a half-sister to Myrtlewood, the female-line ancestor of Seattle Slew and Mr Prospector.

Jet Pilot was purchased for US$41,000 at the Keeneland Yearling Sale by Elizabeth Arden and raced under her Maine Chance Farm colors.

== Racing career ==
Racing at age two, Jet Pilot was second in the 1946 Arlington Futurity and third in that year's Futurity Stakes and Champagne Stakes. However, he won the important Tremont Stakes and Pimlico Futurity.

One of the winter-book favorites for the 1947 Kentucky Derby, Jet Pilot broke from post position thirteen and immediately took the lead in the 73rd edition of the Derby and never relinquished it in defeating C. V. Whitney's betting favorite, Phalanx. In the Preakness Stakes, the second leg of the U.S. Triple Crown series, Jet Pilot finished fourth behind Calumet Farm's winner, Faultless. After the Preakness, Jet Pilot contested the Withers Stakes at Belmont Park, where he finished fourth. He bowed a tendon in that race and was retired to stud for the 1948 season.

The Blood-Horse ranked him eighth among American juvenile males of 1946 and fifth among American 3-year-old males of 1947.

== Stud record ==
Jet Pilot sired multiple stakes race winners Jet Action and Myrtles Jet, plus 1951 Champion 2-year-old Filly, Rose Jet. The product of his last mating was born in 1964.

== Pedigree ==
Pedigree of Jet Pilot, chestnut stallion, 1944
Sire Blenheim (GB) 1927	Blandford (IRE); 1919	Swynford	John O'Gaunt
Sire Blenheim (GB) 1927	Blandford (IRE); 1919	Swynford	Canterbury Pilgrim
Sire Blenheim (GB) 1927	Blandford (IRE); 1919	Blanche	White Eagle
Sire Blenheim (GB) 1927	Blandford (IRE); 1919	Blanche	Black Cherry
Sire Blenheim (GB) 1927	Malva (GB); 1919	Charles O'Malley	Desmond
Sire Blenheim (GB) 1927	Malva (GB); 1919	Charles O'Malley	Goody Two-Shoes
Sire Blenheim (GB) 1927	Malva (GB); 1919	Wild Arum	Robert le Diable
Sire Blenheim (GB) 1927	Malva (GB); 1919	Wild Arum	Marliacea
Dam Black Wave (USA) 1935	Sir Gallahad (FR); 1920	Teddy	Ajax
Dam Black Wave (USA) 1935	Sir Gallahad (FR); 1920	Teddy	Rondeau
Dam Black Wave (USA) 1935	Sir Gallahad (FR); 1920	Plucky Liege	Spearmint
Dam Black Wave (USA) 1935	Sir Gallahad (FR); 1920	Plucky Liege	Concertina
Dam Black Wave (USA) 1935	Black Curl (USA); 1924	Friar Rock	Rock Sand
Dam Black Wave (USA) 1935	Black Curl (USA); 1924	Friar Rock	Fairy Gold
Dam Black Wave (USA) 1935	Black Curl (USA); 1924	Frizeur	Sweeper
Dam Black Wave (USA) 1935	Black Curl (USA); 1924	Frizeur	Frizette (Family:13-c)
