= Friar Rock =

American-bred Thoroughbred racehorse

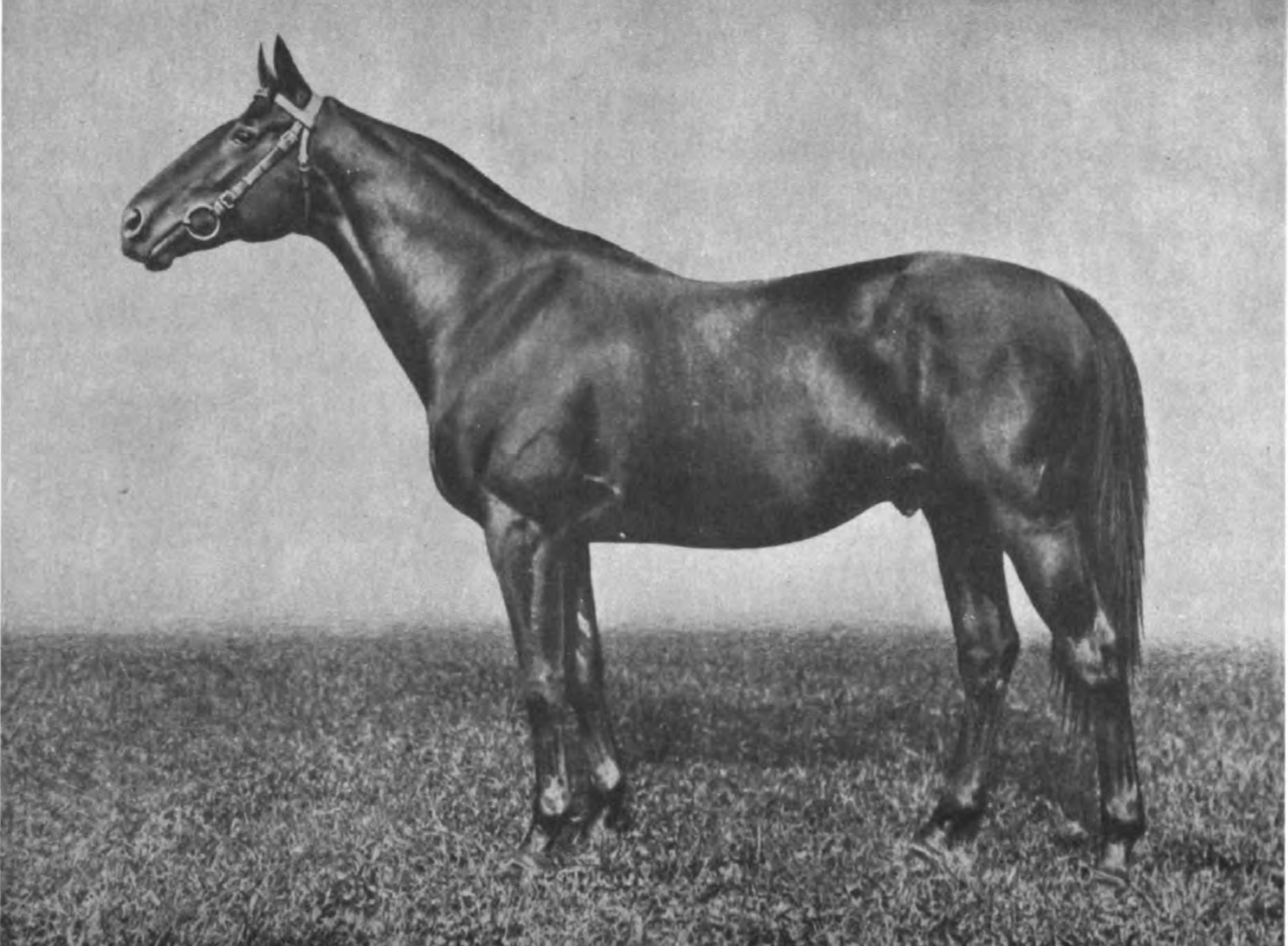
- Thoroughbred Types, 1900-1925 (1926)
- Sire: Rock Sand
- Grandsire: Sainfoin
- Dam: Fairy Gold
- Damsire: Bend Or
- Sex: Stallion
- Foaled: 1913
- Country: United States
- Colour: Chestnut
- Breeder: August Belmont Jr.
- Owner: August Belmont Jr.
- Trainer: Sam Hildreth
- Record: 21: 9-?-?
- Earnings: $20,365

Major wins
- Adirondack Stakes (1915); Whirl Stakes (1915); Brooklyn Handicap (1916); Suburban Handicap (1916); Saratoga Cup (1916) American Classics wins: Belmont Stakes (1916)

Awards
- American Horse of the Year (1916)
- Last updated on August 25, 2007

Friar Rock (1913 – January 8, 1928) was a Champion American Thoroughbred racehorse. His most important win came in the 1916 Belmont Stakes.

== Background ==
Owned and raced by the prominent New York City businessman August Belmont Jr., he was foaled at Belmont's Nursery Stud near Lexington, Kentucky. A chestnut colt with inherited Bend-Or spotting, he was out of Belmont's imported English dam Fairy Gold, who also produced Fair Play, the sire of Man o' War. Friar Rock was sired by Rock Sand, the 1903 English Triple Crown champion purchased by August Belmont Jr. from Sir James Miller and brought to the United States. Friar Rock was trained by future U.S. Racing Hall of Fame inductee Sam Hildreth.

== Racing career ==
Friar Rock was sent to the track at age two, earning wins in the 1915 Adirondack and Whirl Stakes. That year, he won five of his twelve races.At age three, he was the dominant horse in American racing. After winning the important Brooklyn Handicap, Suburban Handicap, Saratoga Cup, and Belmont Stakes, he would be selected United States' Horse of the Year. In the Suburban, Friar Rock was considered a longshot in the field of six. Carrying 99 pounds, he stalked the leaders before taking over in the stretch to win by two lengths over the imported Short Grass, who carried 117 pounds. Friar Rock became the third three-year-old ever to win the Suburban. (The first two were Africander in 1903 and Fitz Herbert in 1909.)

== Retirement and stud ==
August Belmont Jr. sold Friar Rock shortly after winning the 1 3/4 miles Saratoga Cup. New owner John E. Madden brought him to stand at stud at his Hamburg Place farm in Kentucky. Only a minor success as a sire of racers, Friar Rock did produce the noteworthy runner Pilate, who in turn was the sire of Eight Thirty. Pilate himself won 24 of his 44 starts. Friar Rock's other progeny included Rockminster (winner of the Pimlico Cup Handicap), Flat Iron (raced 107 times and won the Hawthorne Handicap), and Polydorus (won the Tremont Stakes). Friar Rock proved to be a good broodmare sire and on five occasions was in the top ten on the annual broodmare sires' list. One of his best-known daughters was Friar's Carse, the United States' Champion Two-Year-Old Filly and dam of War Relic.

In 1918, Friar Rock was sold again and his new owners brought him to Santa Rosa, California, to stand at Rancho Wickiup, where he remained for the rest of his life. Diagnosed as suffering from peritonitis, Friar Rock died at age fifteen on January 8, 1928.

In 1918, Madden had sold a half interest in Friar Rock to John Rosseter. The deal included sending the horse to Rosseter in California until the end of the breeding season 1920. Then Madden was to keep Friar Rock in Kentucky for the seasons of 1921 and 1922. When the end of the season of 1920 came, Rosseter refused to send Friar Rock back to Kentucky. After Madden sued Rosseter, the horse was eventually delivered to him on May 23, 1921, in good condition.
