= Faultless =

American-bred Thoroughbred racehorse

- Sire: Bull Lea
- Grandsire: Bull Dog
- Dam: Unerring
- Damsire: Insco
- Sex: Stallion
- Foaled: 1944
- Country: United States
- Colour: Brown
- Breeder: Calumet Farm
- Owner: Calumet Farm
- Trainer: Horace A. Jones
- Record: 46: 13-5-6
- Earnings: US$304,945

Major wins
- Flamingo Stakes (1947); Blue Grass Stakes (1947); Derby Trial Stakes (1947); Withers Stakes (1947); Gallant Fox Handicap (1948); Tropical Handicap (1949) American Classic Race wins: Preakness Stakes (1947)

Faultless (foaled 1944 in Kentucky) was an American Thoroughbred racehorse best known for winning the 1947 Preakness Stakes.

== Background ==
He was bred and raced by Calumet Farm. His dam, Unerring, was the 1939 American Co-Champion Three-Year-Old Filly. His sire was Calumet's preeminent stallion Bull Lea, who was the sire of seven U.S. Racing Hall of Fame inductees. He was trained by the father/son team of Ben and Jimmy Jones, Faultless was ridden in most of his races by Douglas Dodson.

== Racing career ==
At age two, Faultless did not win a major stakes race, but at age three, he won three important races leading up to the 1947 U.S. Triple Crown series. Despite this, in the Kentucky Derby he was sent off as the fifth choice by bettors behind heavily favored Phalanx. Faultless ran third in the Derby behind Phalanx and winner Jet Pilot. In the ensuing Preakness Stakes, Dodson guided the colt to a win over Jet Pilot, who finished fourth, and Phalanx, who finished third. In the Belmont Stakes, Phalanx bounced back to win the race with Faultless finishing fifth.

Faultless continued racing through age five, then entered stud in 1950. His offspring met with modest racing success.

== Pedigree ==
Pedigree of Faultless
Sire Bull Lea brown 1935	Bull Dog brown 1927	Teddy	Ajax
Sire Bull Lea brown 1935	Bull Dog brown 1927	Teddy	Rondeau
Sire Bull Lea brown 1935	Bull Dog brown 1927	Plucky Liege	Spearmint
Sire Bull Lea brown 1935	Bull Dog brown 1927	Plucky Liege	Concertina
Sire Bull Lea brown 1935	Rose Leaves brown 1916	Ballot	Voter
Sire Bull Lea brown 1935	Rose Leaves brown 1916	Ballot	Cerito
Sire Bull Lea brown 1935	Rose Leaves brown 1916	Colonial	Trenton
Sire Bull Lea brown 1935	Rose Leaves brown 1916	Colonial	Thankful Blossom
Dam Unerring bay 1936	Insco bay 1928	Sir Gallahad	Teddy
Dam Unerring bay 1936	Insco bay 1928	Sir Gallahad	Plucky Liege
Dam Unerring bay 1936	Insco bay 1928	Starflight	Sunstar
Dam Unerring bay 1936	Insco bay 1928	Starflight	Angelic
Dam Unerring bay 1936	Margaret Lawrence brown 1921	Vulcain	Rock Sand
Dam Unerring bay 1936	Margaret Lawrence brown 1921	Vulcain	Lady of the Vale
Dam Unerring bay 1936	Margaret Lawrence brown 1921	Bohemia	Wagner
Dam Unerring bay 1936	Margaret Lawrence brown 1921	Bohemia	Mattiet
