= Cornelius Vanderbilt Whitney =

American businessman

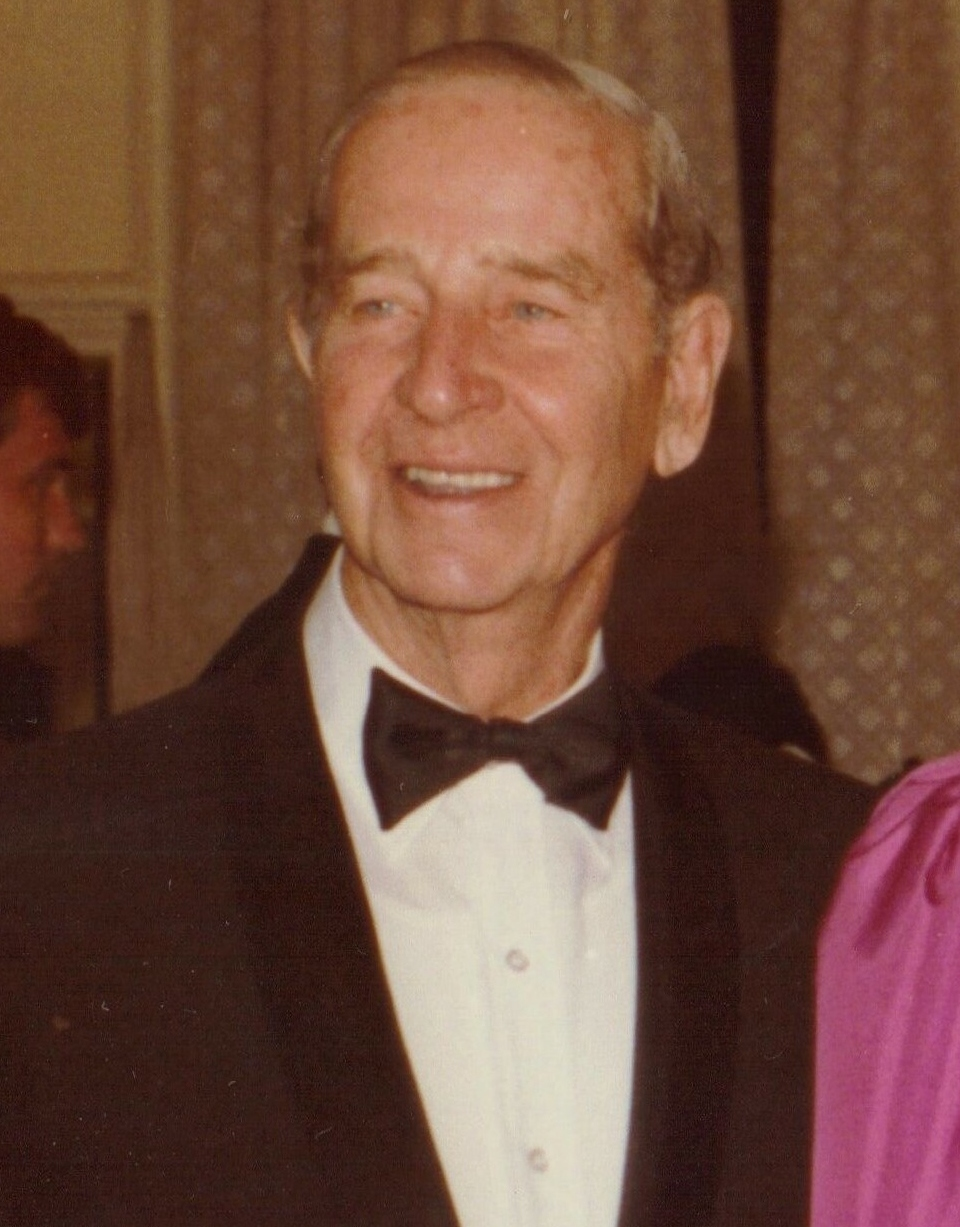
- C. V. Whitney

U.S. Under Secretary of Commerce
- In office 1949–1950
- President: Harry S. Truman
- Preceded by: Charles W. Sawyer
- Succeeded by: W. Walter Williams

U.S. Assistant Secretary of the Air Force
- In office 1947–1949
- President: Harry S. Truman

Personal details
- Born: February 20, 1899 Roslyn, New York, U.S.
- Died: December 13, 1992 (aged 93) Saratoga Springs, New York, U.S.
- Spouses: Marie Norton (m. 1923; div. 1929) Gwladys Crosby Hopkins (m. 1931; div. 1940) Eleanor Searle (m. 1941; div. 1957) Marie Louise Schroeder (m. 1958)
- Children: 5
- Parent(s): Harry Payne Whitney; Gertrude Vanderbilt
- Relatives: See Vanderbilt family and Whitney family
- Education: Yale University
- Occupation: Businessman; Film producer Racehorse owner/breeder Philanthropist

Military service
- Allegiance: United States
- Branch/service: United States Army; United States Air Force
- Rank: Second Lieutenant (Army); Colonel (Air Force)
- Battles/wars: World War I World War II
- Awards: Distinguished Service Medal; Legion of Merit

Cornelius "Sonny" Vanderbilt Whitney (February 20, 1899 – December 13, 1992) was an American businessman, film producer, government official, writer and philanthropist. He was also a polo player who owned a stable of Thoroughbred racehorses.

== Early life ==
Born in Old Westbury, New York, he was the only son of the wealthy and socially prominent Harry Payne Whitney (1872–1932) and his wife, Gertrude Vanderbilt (1875–1942). He had a younger sister, Barbara Vanderbilt Whitney (1903–1982), and an elder sister, Flora Payne Whitney (1897–1986). A member of the Whitney and Vanderbilt families, he inherited a substantial fortune. He also proved to be a capable businessman in his own right.

== Career ==
After graduating from Yale University in 1922, he went to work at a Nevada mine owned by his father. Whitney's paternal grandfather, William Collins Whitney, was a co-founder and director of the Guaranty Trust Company of New York, and in 1926, Whitney was appointed a director, serving on the bank's board until 1940. In 1927, Whitney joined with William Avery Rockefeller III and other investors to back Juan Trippe in establishing the Aviation Corporation of America, which a year later would become Pan American World Airways.

In 1931, Whitney acquired Hudbay. The company became a major zinc mining operation, and Whitney served as chairman of the board until 1964.

=== Equine sports ===
His father, Harry Payne Whitney, had been an avid polo player and thoroughbred racehorse owner, and C.V. Whitney followed in his footsteps, winning the U.S. Open polo title three times. Since 1979, the Greenwich Polo Club at Conyers Farm in Greenwich, Connecticut, has awarded the C.V. Whitney Cup to the winner of an annual polo tournament.

He was the third generation of Whitneys to be heavily involved in thoroughbred horse racing. The Grade 1 Whitney Handicap at Saratoga Race Course was inaugurated in his family's honor in 1928. C.V. Whitney acquired his father's stable in 1930 and on May 17, his two-year-old colt Equipoise gave him his first stakes race victory when he won the Keene Memorial Stakes at Belmont Park. Equipoise would go on to become a success on the racetrack and as a leading sire, and would be inducted into racing's Hall of Fame in 1957. Among Whitney's other outstanding horses, Top Flight was the 1931 American Champion Two-Year-Old Filly and the 1932 American Champion Three-Year-Old Filly, and was also voted into the U.S. Racing Hall of Fame, in 1966.

Although he had fifteen horses compete in the Kentucky Derby, Whitney never won the prestigious race. Silver Spoon was the only filly entered in the Derby between the years 1945 and 1980, coming in a credible fifth in 1959. Ridden by jockey Eddie Arcaro and trained by Sylvester Veitch, Whitney's horse Phalanx won the first division of the 1947 Wood Memorial Stakes, finished second in the 1947 Kentucky Derby, took third in the ensuing Preakness Stakes, then won the Belmont Stakes. In the 1951 Kentucky Derby, Whitney's Veitch-trained colt Counterpoint was still developing after an injury as a yearling that almost ended its career and tired badly, finishing 11th. However, Counterpoint came back to take second place in the Preakness Stakes and subsequently gave Whitney his second win in the Belmont Stakes and then went on to earn 1951 Horse of the Year honors. Among other successful horses from his stables, Career Boy won the United Nations Handicap and was voted the Champion Grass Horse for 1956. First Flight was one of his best fillies, winning the Matron Stakes and beating males in Belmont's Futurity Stakes in 1946.

In 1972 the Keeneland Association honored Whitney with its Mark of Distinction for his contribution to Keeneland and the Thoroughbred industry.

=== Film production ===
Whitney became involved in the motion picture industry, notably with his cousin John Hay Whitney as a major shareholder backing the Technicolor Corporation. The two were also financiers for the 1939 film classic Gone with the Wind. Seventeen years later, C.V. Whitney served as a producer through his own "C.V. Whitney Pictures". His company made three films, the first being the acclaimed 1956 production, The Searchers, directed by John Ford. The second was The Missouri Traveler in 1958 with Brandon deWilde and Lee Marvin, and the third was The Young Land in 1959 with Patrick Wayne and Dennis Hopper.

Whitney was a major financial partner in the development of Marine Studios, designed as an underwater motion picture studio located on the ocean south of St. Augustine, Florida. The Studios opened on June 23, 1938, with an estimated 30,000 visitors and eventually evolved into a major marine attraction. It was billed as "the world's original marine attraction". Whitney sold the attraction and its amenities to a group of St. Augustine businessmen, and Whitney's legacy continues at the Whitney Laboratory nearby.

=== Government and military service ===
Having spent considerable time in France, Whitney's mother Gertrude became involved supporting the Allied forces during World War I. She dedicated a great deal of her time and money to various relief efforts, establishing and maintaining a hospital in France for wounded soldiers. Eighteen-year-old C.V. Whitney joined the United States Army, serving as an aviation cadet in the Signal Corps, rising to the rank of second lieutenant and becoming a military pilot. During the war, Whitney served as a flight instructor in Texas.

In 1932 Whitney unsuccessfully ran for Congress against fellow wealthy Long Islander Robert L. Bacon.

With the onset of American involvement in World War II, Whitney volunteered again for service, rising to the rank of colonel with the United States Army Air Forces. He was awarded the Distinguished Service Medal and Legion of Merit.

At the end of the war, Whitney served under U.S. President Harry S. Truman as Assistant Secretary of the Air Force from 1947 to 1949, and United States Under Secretary of Commerce from 1949 to 1950. He was also appointed President Truman's special envoy to the United Kingdom, Luxembourg, Spain and Italy in 1950.

== Wealth and estates ==
=== Inheritance ===
Cornelius' father Harry Payne Whitney died in 1930; under the terms of his will, Cornelius' received approximately $23,000,000 from his father's $73,000,000 estate after the payment of taxes, debts and other bequests. Specific bequests to Cornelius included:

- an outright lump sum of $2,000,000;
- a 25% share of the residuary estate (which had a net value of approximlately $42,000,000), which was to be held in trust before vesting in Cornelius' absolute ownership on his 35th birthday; and,
- a further 25% share of the residuary estate, which was to be held in Trust during the lifetimes of Cornelius and his oldest son. Cornelius would enjoy the income for his lifetime, after which it would be paid in equal shares to his children.

=== Residences ===
One of Whitney's homes was the "Cady Hill" estate at Saratoga Springs, New York, not far from the Saratoga Race Course. It was there in 1950 that he founded the National Museum of Racing and Hall of Fame and served as its first president. A former director of Churchill Downs, he was given an Eclipse Special Award in 1984 in recognition of his lifetime contribution to thoroughbred horse racing in the United States. The C.V. Whitney Farm in Lexington, Kentucky, bred more than 175 stakes winners until age forced him to sell off a large part of the property in the 1980s to Gainesway Farm. After his death in 1992, his widow, Marylou Whitney, continued breeding and racing operations on a smaller scale. A much respected figure in racing, her "Marylou Whitney Stables" owned Birdstone, the 2004 Belmont Stakes winner.

Upon his death, Whitney owned over 51,000 acres (210 km^{2}) in the Adirondacks along with a great camp called Deerlands. Located within the Oswegatchie Great Forest, the Whitney estate is home to more than 40 lakes and ponds, as well as the headwaters of the Beaver, Raquette and Bog rivers. In 1997, New York State bought 14,700 acres (59 km^{2}) of the 51,000-acre (210 km^{2}) Whitney tract from Marylou Whitney's "Whitney Industries" for $17.1 million.

== Personal life ==
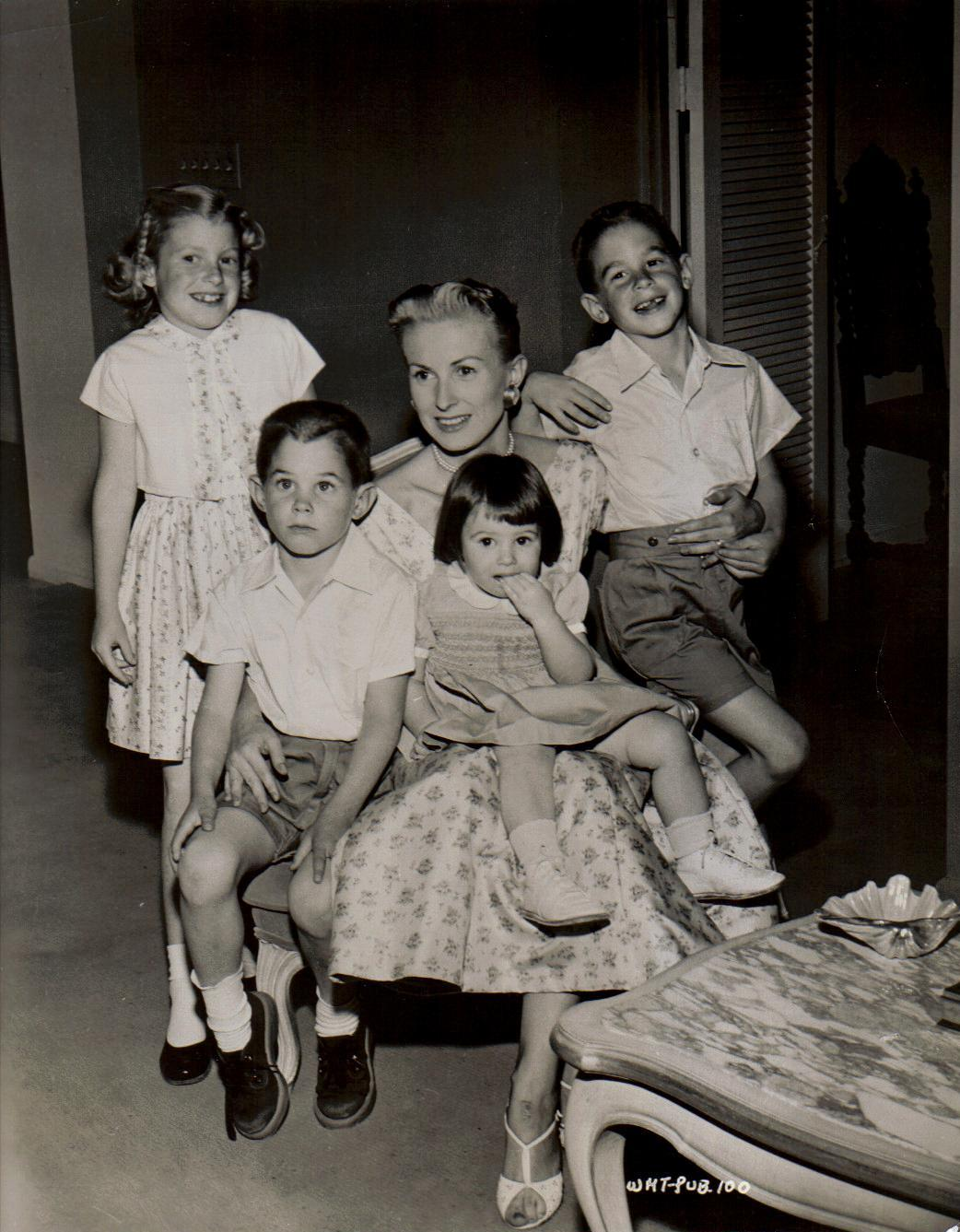
Whitney's fourth wife, Marylou Whitney, with children, 1959

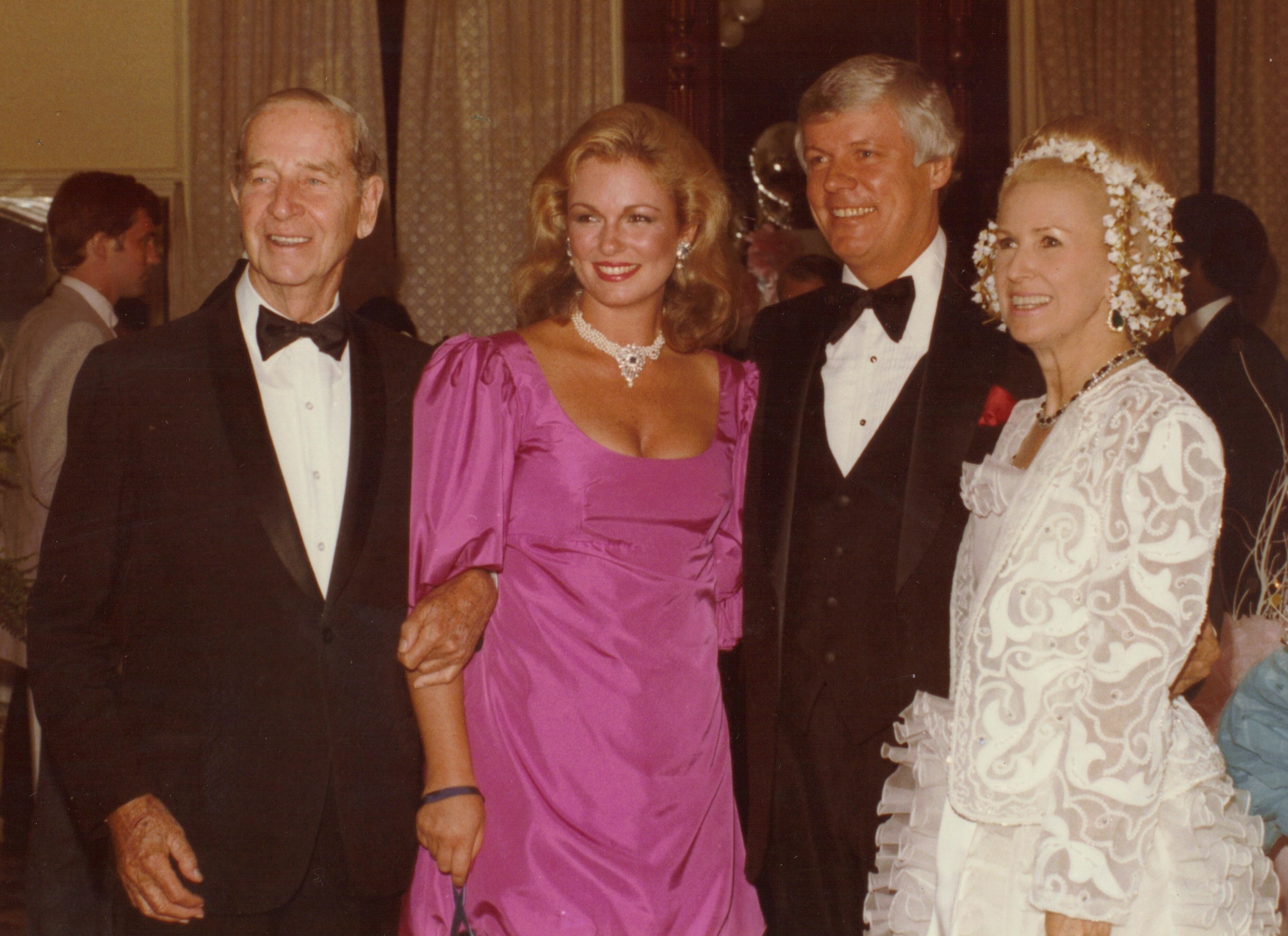
C.V. and Marylou Whitney with Governor and Mrs. John Y. Brown Jr.

Whitney was married four times:

On March 5, 1923, Whitney married for the first time to Marie Norton (1903–1970), daughter of Sheridan Nook Norton, an attorney, and Beulah Sanfield Einstein, in Paris. They divorced in 1929. Marie later married New York Governor and diplomat Averell Harriman, and she was First Lady of New York from January 1, 1955, to December 31, 1958. She and Whitney had two children together:

- Harry Payne Whitney II (1924–1985), who married two times:
  - In 1949 to Alexandra Ewing (1927–2014), daughter of Gifford Cochran Ewing and Frances Riker, by whom he had three children:
    - Gifford Cochran Whitney (b. 1950 - 19 November 2004)
    - Nancy Marie Whitney (b. 1952)
    - Cornelius Scollay Whitney (b. 1954)
  - He later remarried Andrea R. Whitney.
- Nancy Marie Whitney (1926–2006), who married four times and divorced three times:
  - in 1949 to Edwin Denison Morgan III (1921–2001), by whom she had two children:
    - Alida Morgan
    - Pamela Morgan
  - on August 26, 1957, to (Charles) Russell Hurd
  - on July 1, 1958, to his widowed elder brother, Edward Augustus Hurd Jr.
    - Victoria Marie Hurd
    - Christopher Hurd
  - and finally, to well known water colorist Pierre Lutz (1923–1991).

C.V. Whitney's second marriage was to Gwladys Crosby "Gee" Hopkins, from 1931 to 1940. They had one daughter:

- Gail Whitney (1939–1963), who married Richard Cox Cowell in 1958. They were divorced a year later. In 1961, she married Louis S. Stur. Gail died at the age of 24.

In 1941, in Plymouth, Ohio, he married for the third time to Eleanor Searle (c. 1908–2002), daughter of Dr. and Mrs. George James Searle. Before their divorce in 1957, they had one son:

- Cornelius Searle Whitney (1944–2015), an economist, psychologist and philanthropist.

On January 25, 1958, he married for the fourth, and final, time to Marie Louise Schroeder (1925–2019), universally known as "Marylou". She was an actress in a movie he produced, called The Missouri Traveler. They remained married until his death. Together, they had one daughter:

- Cornelia Whitney, an art instructor and divorced mother of one who lives in Santa Fe, New Mexico.

Over the 1920s, Whitney successfully fended off several million-dollar lawsuits filed by former Ziegfeld Follies dancer Evan-Burrows Fontaine charging him with breach of promise and paternity of her son.

Whitney died in 1992 in Saratoga Springs, New York, at the age of 93 and is buried there in the Greenridge Cemetery. In 1994, a portion of New York State Route 50 in the City of Saratoga Springs was designated "C.V. Whitney Memorial Highway."

=== Philanthropy and arts patronage ===
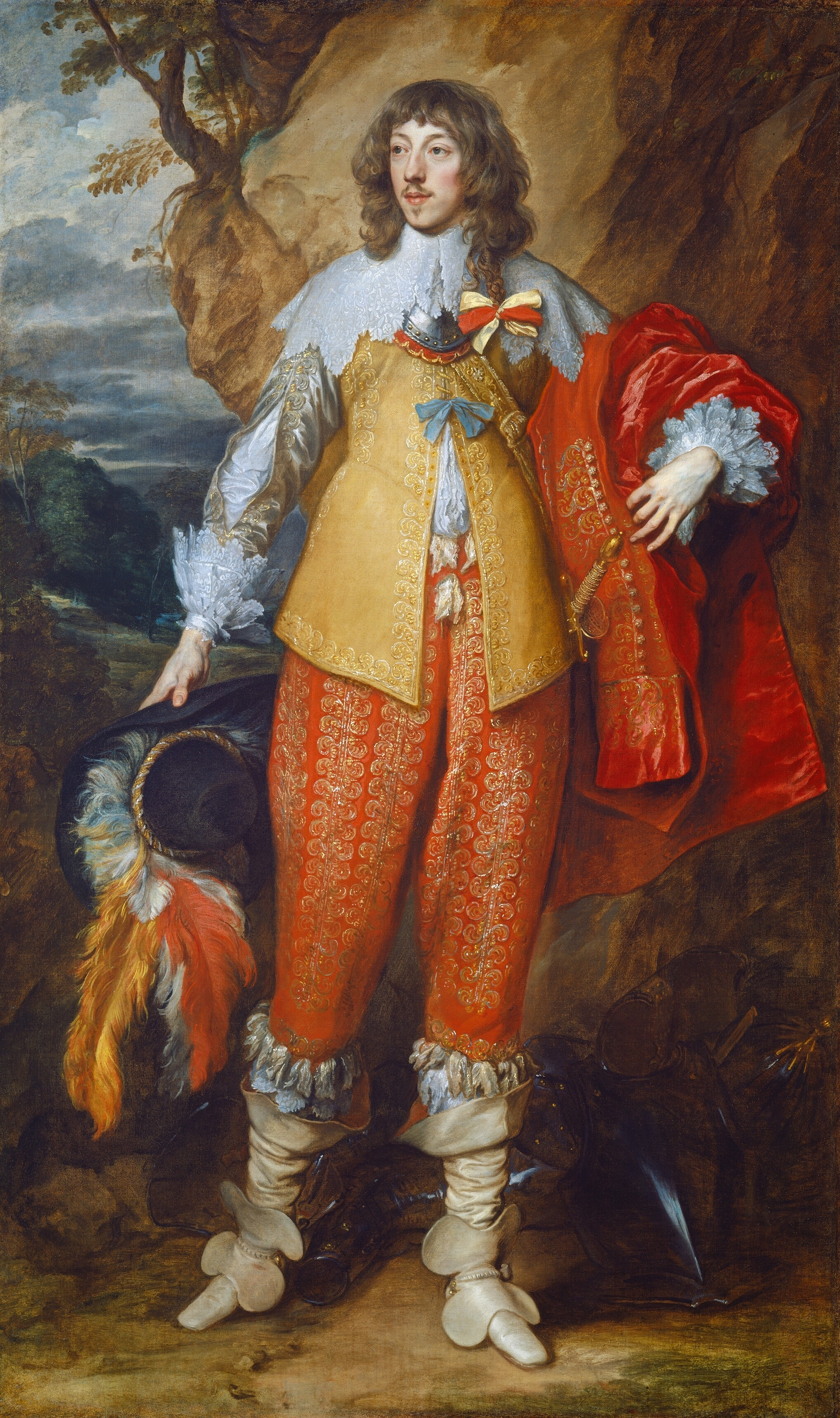
Portrait of Henri II de Lorraine by Anthony van Dyck, 1634, which Whitney donated to the National Gallery of Art

Whitney was raised in an artistic environment. His mother, Gertrude, was an accomplished sculptor who studied in Paris under Auguste Rodin. She was also the founder of the Whitney Museum of American Art in New York City. As an adult, C.V. Whitney played a role in establishing the Saratoga Performing Arts Center in Saratoga Springs, New York, was a supporter of the American Museum of Natural History in New York City, and was a founder of the Whitney Gallery of Western Art in Cody, Wyoming. The "Mr. and Mrs. Cornelius Vanderbilt Whitney Hall of Fame" collection was provided in 1987 to the National Museum of Dance in Saratoga Springs, New York. It is the only museum in the world dedicated to professional dance.

Whitney donated important artworks to various museums. Notable donations include the gift of a 1634 Anthony van Dyck painting of Henri II de Lorraine, 5e Duc de Guise, which had been in the Whitney family for three generations, to the National Gallery of Art in Washington, D.C. In 1953, Whitney donated the 1872 Thomas Eakins painting The Biglin Brothers Racing to the National Gallery of Art.

Whitney's interest in the natural history of marine animals resulted in the 1938 founding of the world's first oceanarium. Marineland, near St. Augustine, Florida, included a small research laboratory that drew academic biologists. Eventually, Whitney provided the University of Florida with an adjacent parcel of land plus half of the construction capital required to build a full-scale academic center, the C.V. Whitney Laboratory for Experimental Marine Biology and Medicine (now called The Whitney Laboratory for Marine Bioscience). In addition, he donated Whitney Hall to the university, a building that serves as a conference center and contains dormitories and apartments.

In 1963, his estate at Old Westbury, New York, was subdivided and offered to the New York Institute of Technology for use as part of its Long Island campus.

In 2000, his widow helped finance the publication of Legend of Cornelius Vanderbilt Whitney by Jeffrey L. Rodengen.

== Written works ==
Cornelius Vanderbilt Whitney wrote five books:

- Lone and Level Sands (1951) – a personal narrative of Allied aerial operations during World War II
- High Peaks (1977) – autobiography
- Live a Year with a Millionaire (1981)
- Owl Hoots Again (1988) – a collection of short stories for children
- First Flight: The Diary of a Cadet in the Signal Corps in World War I (1989)

== See also ==
- Whitney Marine Lab
