= Dixie Stakes top three finishers =

This is a listing of the horses that finished in either first, second, or third place and the number of starters in the Dinner Party Stakes, at Pimlico Race Course in Baltimore, Maryland, an American grade 2 thoroughbred horse race run at 1-1/8 miles on the turf. The race was the second leg of the former "Triple Turf.".

Year	Winner	Second	Third	Starters
2026	Fort Washington	A Bourbon for Toby	Cruise the Nile	5
2025	Fort Washington	Cash Equity (FR)	Desvio	10
2024	Balnikhov	Crabs N Beer	Running Bee	9
2023	Never Explain	Hurricane Dream	Emmanuel	7
2022	Set Piece	Tango Tango Tango	Atone	7
2021	Somelikeithotbrown	Talk or Listen	Midnight Tea Time	8
2020	Factor This	Somelikeithotbrown	Hembree	7
2019	Catholic boy	Admission Office	Just Howard	12
2018	Fire Away	Unbridled Juan	Just Howard	8
2017	World Approval	Projected	Blacktype	11
2016	Takeover Target	Ring Weekend	Grand Arch	14
2015	Ironicus	Cage Fighter	Up With the Birds	14
2014	Utley	Hey Leroy	Chamois	10
2013	Skyring	Willcox Inn	Optimizer	13
2012	Hudson Steele	Humble and Hungry	Fort Dei Marmi	11
2011	Paddy O'Prado	Baryshnikov	Bim Bam	10
2010	Strike a Deal	Just as Well	Rahystrada	12
2009	Parading	Just As Well	Wesley	11
2008	Pays to Dream	Stay Close	Ra Der Dean	9
2007	Remarkable News	Cosmonaught	Outperformance	11
2006	Better Talk Now	Dreadnaught	Artie Schiller	7
2005	Cool Conductor	Artie Schiller	Good Reward	5
2004	Mr. O'Brien	Millennium Dragon	Warleigh	11
2003	Dr. Brendler	Perfect Soul	Sardaukar	6
2002	Strut the Stage	Del Mar Show	Slew the Red	7
2001	Hap	Make No Mistake	Cynics Beware	8
2000	Quiet Resolve	Haami	Holditholditholdit	9
1999	Middlesex Drive	Sky Colony	Divide and Conquer	10
1998	Yagli	Sky Colony	Blazing Sword	12
1997	Ops Smile	Brave Note	Sharp Appeal	8
1996	Gold and Steel	Same Old Wish	Comstock Lode	9
1995	The Vid	Pennine Ridge	Blue's Traveller	6
1994	Paradise Creek	Lure	Astudillo	5
1993	Lure	Star of Cozzene	Binary Light	8
1992	Sky Classic	Fourstars Allstar	Social Retiree	10
1991	Double Booked	Chas' Whim	Opening Verse	9
1990	Two Moccasins'	My Big Boy	Marksmanship	10
1989	Coeur de Lion	Dance Card Filled	Dynaformer	10
1988	Kadial	Top Guest	Milesius	5
1987	Akabir	Little Bold John	Vilzak	9
1986	Uptown Swell	Southern Sultan	Carlypha	13
1985	Nassipour	Persian Tiara	Computer's Choice	8
1984	Persian Tiara	Crazy Moon	Canadian Factor	8
1983	Khatango	The Times	Super Sunrise	10
1982	Robsphere	Present the Colors	Rich and Ready	13
1981	El Barril	Buckpoint	Birthday List	9
1980	Marquee Universal	The Very One	Match the Hatch	14
1979	The Very One	That's a Nice	Fluorescent Light	8
1978	Fluorescent Light	That's a Nice	Improviser	7
1978	Bowl Game	Oilfield	Trumpeter Swan	9
1977	Improviser	Grey Beret	Oilfield	12
1976	Barcas	One On the Aisle	Neapolitan Way	9
1975	Bemo	Outdoors	Drollery	13
1974	London Company	Scrimscaw	Mister Diz	9
1973	Laplander	Chrisaway	Wustenchef	10
1972	Onondaga	Star Envoy	New Alibhai	12
1971	Chompion	Tudor Reward	North Flight	10
1970	Fort Marcy	War Censor	Jungle Cove	9
1969	Czar Alexander	Taneb	Jean-Pierre	n/a
1968	High Hat	Irish Rebellion	Royal Malabar	n/a
1967	War Censor	Deck Hand	Needle Him	n/a
1966	Knightly Manner	Marchio	Paoluccio	n/a
1965	Or et Argent	Kentucky Jug	Desert Love	n/a
1964	Will I Rule	Turbo Jet II	Your Alibhai	n/a
1963	Cedar Key	Mr Steu	Parka	n/a
1962	Wise Ship	Sunshine Cake	El Bandido	n/a
1961	Hunter's Rock	Shield Bearer	Art Market	n/a
1960	Shield Bearer	Harmonizing	Mystic II	n/a
1959	One-Eyed King	Oligarchy	Mystic II	n/a
1958	Pop Corn	Master Boing	Adare II	n/a
1957	Akbar Khan	Jabneh	Blue Choir	n/a
1956	Chevation	Akbar Khan	Maharaiah	n/a
1955	St. Vincent	Kaster	Maharaiah	n/a
1954	Straight Face	Golden Gloves	Capeador	n/a
1953	Royal Vale	Cold Command	Crafty Admiral	n/a
1952	Altered	Auditing	Hull Down	n/a
1951	County Delight	On The Mark	Why Not Now	n/a
1950	Loser Weeper	Double Brandy	Going Away	n/a
1949	Chains	Contest	Pilaster	n/a
1948	Fervent	Stymie	Incline	n/a
1947	Assault	Rico Monte	Talon	n/a
1946	Armed	Stymie	Trymenow	n/a
1945	Rounders	He Rolls	Gay Bit	n/a
1944	Sun Again	Rounders	Alquest	n/a
1943	Riverland	Attention	Anticlimax	n/a
1942	Whirlaway	Attention	Mioland	n/a
1941	Haltal	Mioland	Dit	n/a
1940	Honey Cloud	Filisteo	Aethelwold	n/a
1939	Sir Damion	Tatterdemalion	Jacola	n/a
1938	Pompoon	Busy K.	M'ked General	n/a
1937	Calumet Dick	Finance	Aneroid	n/a
1936	Dark Hope	Good Goods	Gallant Mac	n/a
1935	Only One	Head Play	Howard	
1934	Equipoise	Chatmoss	Fla'g Mamie	
1933	Stepenfetchit	Keep Out	Tred Avon	
1932	Gallant Knight	Sun Meadow	Aegis	
1931	Paul Bunyan	Frisus	William T	
1930	Sandy Ford	Inception	Sir Harry	
1929	Diavolo	Victorian	Display	
1928	Mike Hall	Scapa Flow	Sir Harry	
1927	Mars	Display	Edisto	
1926	Sarazen	Sun Pal	G. Thatcher	
1925	Sarazen	Spot Cash	Joy Smoke	
1924	Chacloet	Martingale	Rev. Agent	
1923-to	No Race	No Race	No Race	0
1905	No Race	No Race	No Race	0
1904	The Southerner	Ostrich	Andrew Mack	
1903	Colonsay	none	none	
1902	Adelaide Prince	Potheen	Flintlock	
1901-to	No Race	No Race	No Race	0
1889	No Race	No Race	No Race	0
1888	Taragon	Marauder	Tea Tray	
1887	Hanover	Glenmound	none	
1886	The Bard	Blue Wing	Wheatley	
1885	East Lynne	Richmond	Longview	
1884	Loftin	Blast	Thackeray	
1883	George Kinney	Trafalgar	Gonfalon	
1882	Monarch	Hilarity	Blenheim	
1881	Crickmore	Eole	Barrett	
1880	Grenada	Oden	Ferncliffe	
1879	Monitor	Lord Murphy	Harold	
1878	Duke of Magenta	Bonnie Wood	Spartan	
1877	King Faro	Major Barker	Susquehanna	
1876	Vigil	Parole	Heretog	
1875	Tom Ochiltree	Viator	Joe Cerns	
1874	Vandalite	Madge	Brigand	
1873	Tom Bowling	Merodac	Lizzie Lucas	
1872	Hubbard	Joe Daniels	True Blue	
1871	Harry Bassett	none	none	
1870	Preakness	Ecliptic	Foster	

A † designates a Breeders Cup winner.
