= Maryland Jockey Club =

American sporting organization

The Maryland Jockey Club
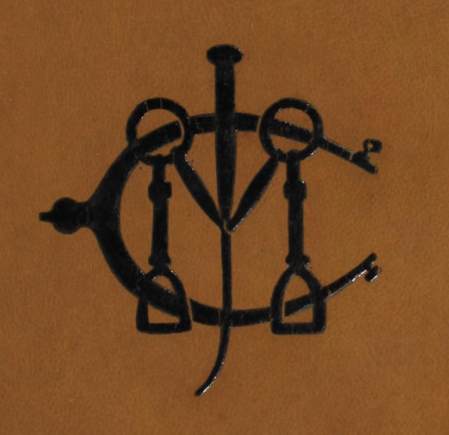
- Type: Non-profit organisation
- Industry: Horse Racing
- Founded: 1743
- Headquarters: Maryland,
- Key people: George Washington; William Paca; Charles Carroll of Carrollton
- Products: Betting, lottery, sports
- Website: www.pimlico.com

The Maryland Jockey Club is a sporting organization dedicated to horse racing, founded in Annapolis in 1743. It is chartered as the oldest sporting organization and is currently the corporate name of the company that operates Laurel Park Racecourse in Laurel, Maryland and Bowie Race Track in Bowie, Maryland, the latter of which ceased operations as a track in 1985 and now serves as a training center for Thoroughbred racehorses.

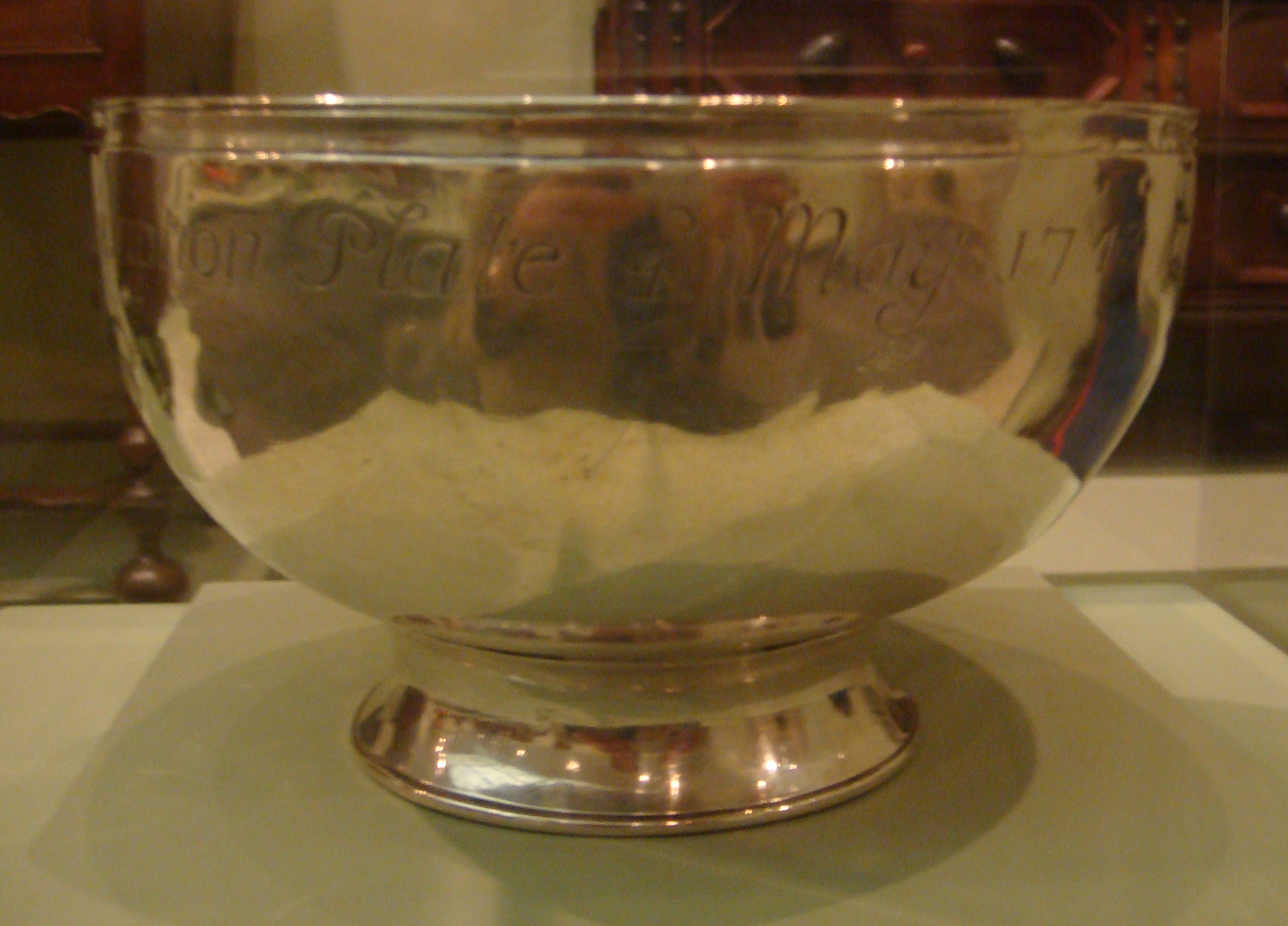
The Annapolis Subscription Plate, awarded to the winner of the first recorded formal horse race in Maryland. The race was held in May 1743 and was won by Dungannon, owned by the planter and horse breeder George Hume Steuart.

== History ==
The Maryland Jockey Club was founded in 1743. The Annapolis Subscription Plate, the second oldest trophy in America and the oldest recorded formal horse race in Maryland, was won in that same year of 1743 by George Hume Steuart's Dungannon.

Irregular race meetings were held in spring and autumn seasons during an eleven-year span from 1755 through 1766. The exact dates, start times and number of races carded during these meeting were not uniform in part due to interference from the French and Indian War.

Future president of the United States George Washington attended the Maryland Jockey Club race meeting frequently in 1762 going to the track for almost every carded event. He also attended race meetings in 1766, 1767, 1771, 1772 and 1773.

=== Revolutionary War ===
Regularly scheduled race meetings were held during both the spring and autumn in 1769 with uniform start times and number of races carded. The meets were run in Annapolis, Maryland. The races were continued in this fashion at that same location until 1775. In the autumn of 1775 the Maryland Jockey Club postponed all racing, due to the break out of war, upon the recommendation of Congress, "in consequence of report upon the state of the country. All should quietly return to their homes."

In 1782, some Annapolis races resumed in Autumn, the country having returned to a state of normalcy following the Revolutionary War. The Maryland Jockey Club revitalized on March 1, 1783, some six months before the formal peace treaty ending the war was signed by two Jockey Club members; Governor William Paca and Charles Carroll of Carrollton (both also signers of the Declaration of Independence).

A meeting of the Jockey Club took place on Saturday, March 1, 1783, at Mr Mann's tavern in Annapolis. Club rules were set down including that the plate given by the club should be run on the first Tuesday of November, at Annapolis, that the prize money should be "sixty guineas", and that the annual subscription should be "three guineas".

=== 19th century ===
The Maryland Jockey Club was issued a new charter by the U.S. Congress in 1830 which is now displayed in the Library of Congress in Washington, D.C. General T. M. Forman was elected president of the Jockey Club; B. H. Cohen, treasurer; and J. S. Skinner, corresponding secretary. With the decline of Annapolis and the growth of Baltimore as an economic center, the Maryland Jockey Club shifted its operations to "Central Course, Baltimore," about five miles southwest of the city on the Frederick Pike.

In 1831, President Andrew Jackson became a member of the Maryland Jockey Club and raced his very own White House Stable in meets under the nom de course A. J. Donelson, which was actually the name of his private secretary.

In 1867 the site of present-day Pimlico Race Course was incorporated for a track by the state by way of the Maryland General Assembly. While attending an 1868 meet at Saratoga Race Course in New York, Maryland Governor Oden Bowie and others attended that Saratoga meet and devised the Dinner Party Stakes (now called the Dixie Stakes) for a track in Baltimore.

In September 1869, the first Maryland State Fair was held at Pimlico Race Course.

The present site of the Maryland Jockey Club was opened at Pimlico on October 25, 1870. A new corporation (Pimlico) was organized on May 14 of that same year in a ballroom of the Barnum's City Hotel in Baltimore. Governor Oden Bowie was elected its first President. The first stakes race held at the track was the Dinner Party Stakes and it was won by Preakness, a son of Lexington on October 27, 1870. Stakes races also run that year were the "Breakfast Stakes" and the "Bowie Stakes," both were won by Glenelg.

In 1873, Pimlico staged the first Preakness Stakes a classic event for three-year-olds. There were seven starters from 21 subscribers to pre-liminary races. Survivor won the inaugural Preakness Stakes which was named for the winner of the first Dinner Party Stakes.

In 1876, the Maryland Jockey Club presented nine stakes races (then a record), which attracted 312 nominations. The signature event of the meet was the fourth running of the Preakness Stakes which was won by Shirley.

In 1877, the United States Congress, both the House of Representatives and the Senate adjourned on October 24 so that members of both houses could witness a race of intersectional scope in which Parole, Ten Broeck and Tom Ochiltree met. They finished in that order in what was to become known as "the Big Race" in a stakes program of ten stakes races.

=== 21st century ===
In 2011, the Stronach Group acquired full control of Maryland Jockey Club assets And operations.

== Notable Members ==
- George Washington
- William Paca
- Charles Carroll of Carrollton
- George Hume Steuart
- William Steuart
- Andrew Jackson

== See also ==
- Preakness Stakes
