= 1871 Maryland gubernatorial election =

- November 7, 1871
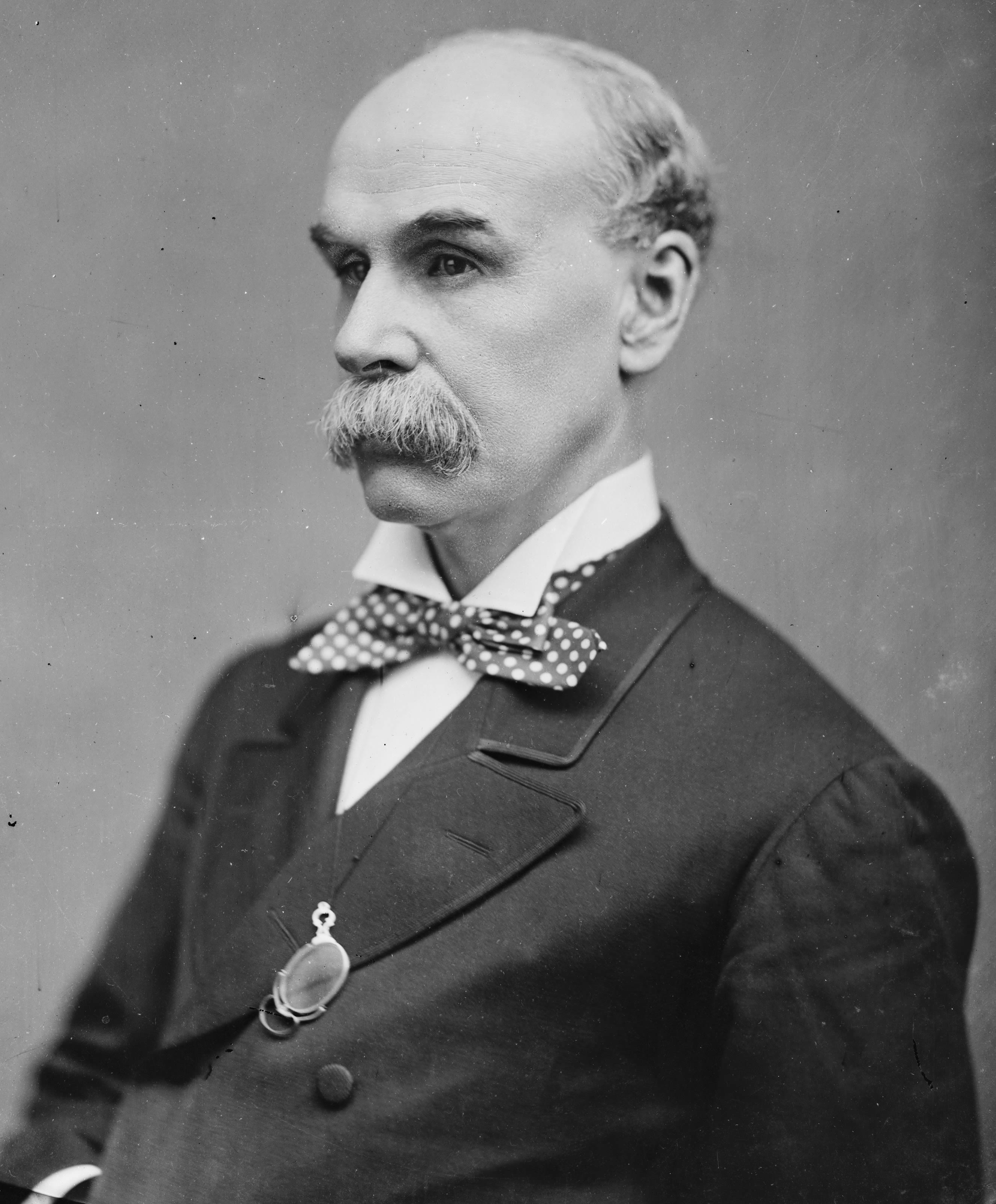

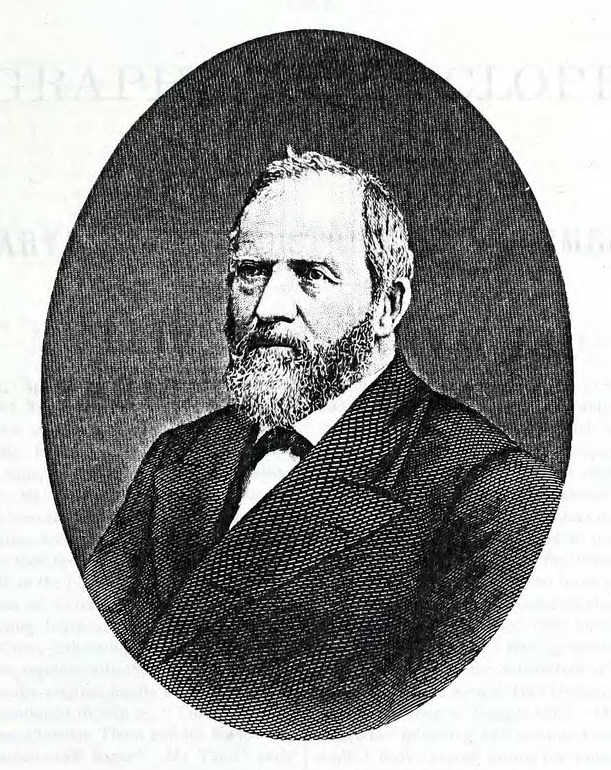
Nominee	William Pinkney Whyte	Jacob Tome
Party	Democratic	Republican
Popular vote	73,958	58,838
Percentage	55.69%	44.31%
- County results Whyte: 50–60% 60–70% Tome: 50–60%
Governor before election
Oden Bowie
Democratic
Elected Governor
William Pinkney Whyte
Democratic

The 1871 Maryland gubernatorial election took place on November 7, 1871.

Incumbent Democratic Governor Oden Bowie did not seek re-election.

Democratic candidate William Pinkney Whyte defeated Republican candidate Jacob Tome.

== General election ==
=== Candidates ===
- William Pinkney Whyte, Democratic, former U.S. Senator
- Jacob Tome, Republican, businessman, former State Senator

=== Results ===
1871 Maryland gubernatorial election (Note: Gubernatorial Elections gives the result as Whyte 73,959, Tome 58,824.)
Party	Candidate	Votes	%	±%
Democratic	William Pinkney Whyte	73,958	55.69%	
Republican	Jacob Tome	58,838	44.31%	
Majority		15,120	11.38%	
Turnout		132,796		
Democratic hold		Swing		
