= Parole Hunt Club =

Half-mile race track in Parole, Maryland

The Parole Hunt Club was a half-mile race track in Parole, Maryland, dedicated to horse racing, including pacers and trotters, on land now known as Riva Road. Until its redevelopment as a shopping center in the late 1950s, the club was the location of the first recorded formal horse race in Maryland.

== History ==
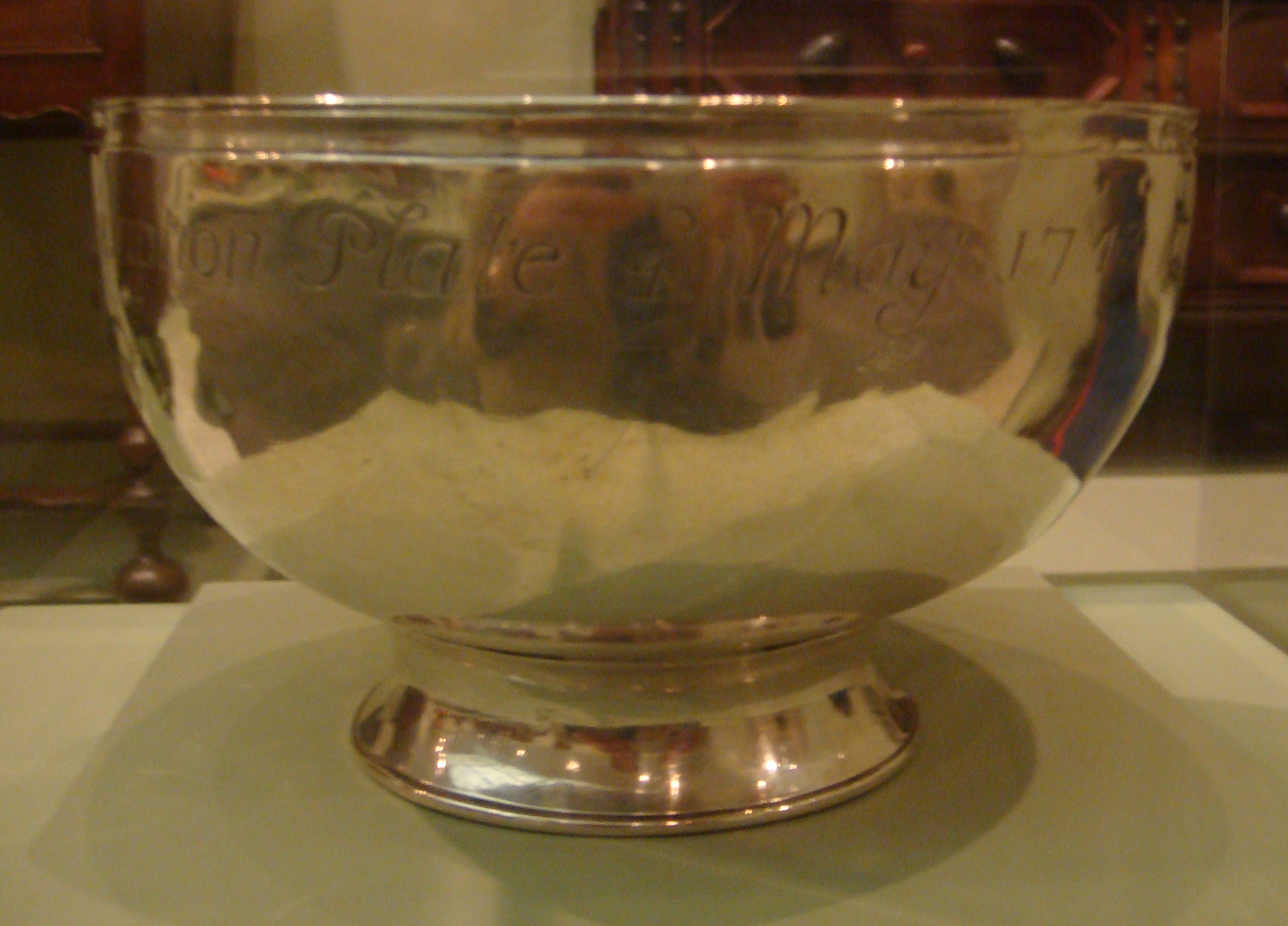
The Annapolis Subscription Plate, awarded to Dungannon, winner of the first recorded formal horse race in Maryland.

In the 1740s, racing was established in many towns in Maryland, with numerous gentlemen of means establishing large stud farms. The first jockey club was founded in Annapolis in around 1750, and racing soon grew to become an important part of the social and political life of the colony.

The first formal horse race in Maryland took place at Parole in May 1743. Charles Carroll (whose son, also called Charles Carroll, would later sign the Declaration of Independence in 1776) wagered that his horse would win in a 3-mile race. Carroll's horse ran against Dungannon, (a.k.a. "Duncannon"), a thoroughbred racehorse owned by the tobacco planter and horse breeder George Hume Steuart (1700-1784), who had imported the horse from England.

At stake was a silver trophy, the Annapolis Subscription Plate. The silver plate itself - in reality more of a bowl than a plate - is now displayed in the Baltimore Museum of Art, and was crafted by the Annapolis silversmith, John Inch. It is the oldest surviving silver object made in Maryland and the second oldest horseracing trophy in America.

Dungannon won the race, establishing a tradition of thoroughbred racing that would last for 200 years. The Parole Hunt Club racetrack was sold in the late 1950s to property developers, and in 1962 it became a shopping center known as the Parole Plaza, which was torn down and redeveloped between 2004 and 2008 to become a mixed-use development called Annapolis Towne Center at Parole, now known as Annapolis Town Center.
