= Reginald Bowie =

American politician and businessman (1854–1926)

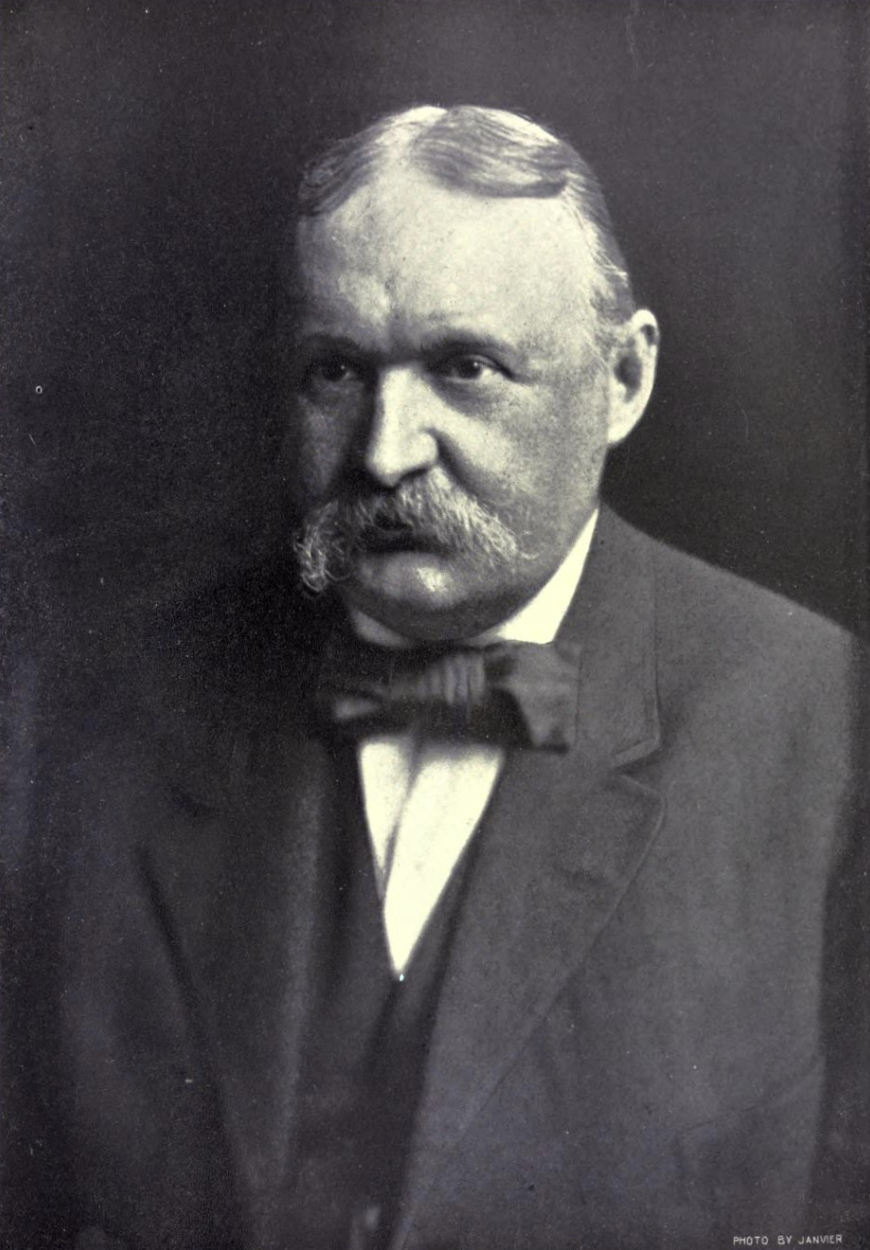
- Bowie in 1912 publication

Member of the Maryland House of Delegates
- In office 1892

Personal details
- Born: December 14, 1854 Montpelier, Maryland, U.S.
- Died: November 5, 1926 (aged 71) Baltimore, Maryland, U.S.
- Resting place: Lorraine Park Cemetery; Baltimore, Maryland, U.S.
- Party: Democratic
- Spouse: Blanche Hurtt Crouch (m. 1880)
- Children: 3
- Relatives: Oden Bowie (cousin)
- Occupation: Politician; businessman; engineer
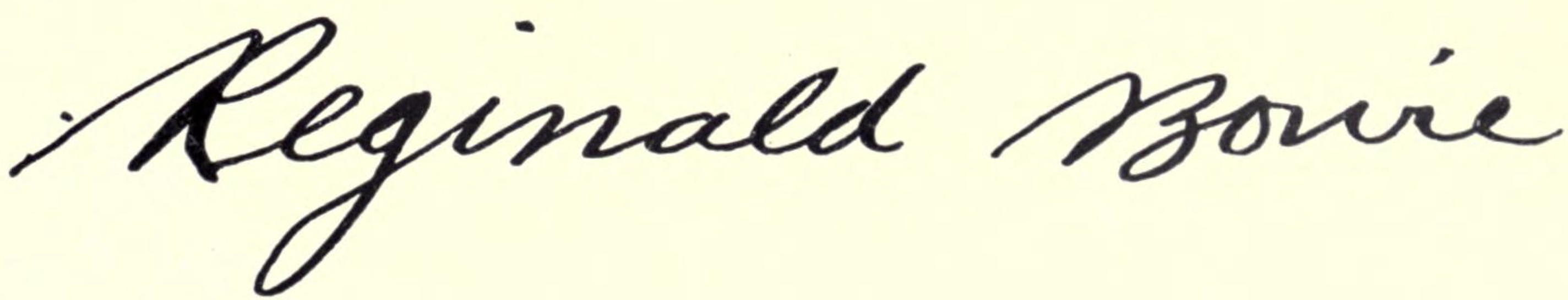
- Signature

Reginald Bowie (December 14, 1854 – November 5, 1926) was an American politician, businessman and engineer from Maryland. He served as a member of the Maryland House of Delegates in 1892.

== Early life ==
Reginald Bowie was born on December 14, 1854, in Montpelier in Prince George's County, Maryland, to Adeline (née Snowden) and Walter William Weems Bowie. His father was state comptroller. Bowie was a cousin of Oden Bowie. He attended common schools in Prince George's County.

== Career ==
In 1872, Bowie moved to Baltimore and joined Snowden & Cowman, an elevator and dental supplies manufacturer. He worked as an apprentice for four years. He also worked as a foreman the last twelve years. He worked for the company for twenty years.

Bowie was a Democrat. Bowie was elected to the Maryland House of Delegates in 1892 for one term. In 1893, Bowie moved to Birmingham, Alabama, to work as chief engineer of a coal and coke company. He worked there for some months and then returned to Baltimore to work at Snowden & Cowman. He remained with them until he was appointed chief engineer of the post office building. In 1898, Bowie was appointed chief boiler inspector for Maryland. He was appointed again by Governor John Walter Smith and continued to work in that role for succeeding governors.

== Personal life ==
Bowie married Blanche Hurtt Crouch, of Chestertown, Maryland, on January 28, 1880. He had two sons and a daughter, Clarence K., Cecelius Calvert and Mary Bernice.

Bowie died on November 5, 1926, at his home at 1132 Gorsuch Avenue in Baltimore. He was buried at Lorraine Park Cemetery in Baltimore.
