= Lorraine Park Cemetery =

Cemetery in Baltimore, Maryland, U.S.

Coordinates: 39°18′46.5″N 76°43′18″W

Lorraine Park Cemetery is a cemetery located in Baltimore, Maryland. It rests on about 60 acres (240,000 m^{2}) of land. Formerly known as Lorraine Farm, the exact date of its founding is not entirely known - however, it may have been founded as early as 1872. Founded by Reverend William Prescott Webb, most of its acreage was sold to the Lorraine Cemetery Company in 1884.

The first interment was a lady named Margaret Rand, in 1883 and by 1900, it had over 700 interments. The cemetery served as the preferred resting place for the area's Chinese community for many years.

At one point the cemetery went bankrupt and was purchased by Charles Blackburn Sims. Upon his purchasing the cemetery, it began to take on its present appearance.

Construction on the cemetery's mausoleum began in the late 1920s and ended in 1973.

The cemetery contains three British war graves of World War II - a Royal Navy Seaman, a Merchant Navy Master, and a Royal Artillery Gunner.

On September 12, 1976, the body of an unidentified young woman was found face first wrapped in a sheet and a seed bag and 2 bandanas with eye and mouth holes cut in them over her face. She had been raped, strangled and bound then thrown into the cemetery, or killed in a different location and then dumped there. The case was featured on America's Most Wanted, and although the murder remains unsolved, DNA evidence proved in September 2021 that she was Margaret Fetterolf, a 16-year old girl who had run away from home in the summer of 1975.

== Notable interments ==
- Rex Barney, baseball player
- William S. Booze (1862–1933), U.S. Representative
- Reginald Bowie (1854–1926), Maryland politician, businessman and engineer
- Paul Cavanagh, actor
- Berrie Henry Jarrett, Medal of Honor recipient
- Rudy Kneisch, baseball player
- Cornelius Lawrence Ludlow Leary (1813–1893), state delegate and U.S. Representative
- Charlie Maisel, baseball player
- Fritz Maisel, baseball player
- Mildred Natwick, actress
- Jerry Scala, baseball player
