= Bowl Game (horse) =

American-bred Thoroughbred racehorse

- Sire: Tom Rolfe
- Grandsire: Ribot
- Dam: Around the Roses
- Damsire: Round Table
- Sex: Gelding
- Foaled: 1974
- Country: United States
- Colour: Dark Brown
- Breeder: Greentree Stud
- Owner: Greentree Stable
- Trainer: John M. Gaver Jr.
- Record: 23: 11-6-5
- Earnings: US$$907,083

Major wins
- Washington, D.C. International Stakes (1979); Man o' War Stakes (1979); Turf Classic Invitational Stakes (1979); Dixie Handicap (1978); Gulfstream Park Handicap (1978); Pan American Handicap (1978); Arlington Handicap (1979); Hialeah Turf Cup Handicap (1979)

Awards
- American Champion Male Turf Horse (1979)

Bowl Game (1974–2006) was an American Thoroughbred racehorse. He was bred in Kentucky by Greentree Stud and raced under the same Greentree Stable banner as his owner. He finished racing with a record of 11-6-5 in 23 starts with career earnings of US$907,083. Bowl Game Creek was best known for his wins in the grade one Washington, D.C. International Stakes, the grade one Man o' War Stakes and the grade two Dixie Handicap. In 1979 he became the only horse ever have won all four prestigious turf races of the United States. That same year he was named the country's top grass equine by being voted 1979 American Champion Male Turf Horse honors.

== Early career ==
Bowl Game was a late-developing thoroughbred. As a three-year-old, he raced twice, placing third both times, with earnings of $2,400.

== Four-year-old season ==
In his four-year-old season, Bowl Game raced a total of 10 times in a nine-month campaign that spanned February through November 1978. In February, he prepped in an allowance race and then stepped up to graded stakes action in March. In that race, he won the Grade I Gulfstream Park Handicap at Gulfstream Park just outside Miami, Florida, under regular jockey Jorge Velásquez. In April, he won the Pan American Handicap at Gulfstream Park. In May, he won the Dixie Stakes at Pimlico Race Course in Baltimore, Maryland for his sixth straight win, capturing one of the oldest trophies in American sports, the Annapolis Subscription Plate. This victory in the oldest race in the Mid-Atlantic states at 1 1/2 miles (2.4 km) came on soft turf in 2:33.40 over a field of nine stakes winners, including Oilfield and Trumpeter Swan, who finished second and third. Bowl Game concluded the year with a record of 6 wins, 3 seconds, and 1 third in 10 starts and earnings of $311,245.

== Five-year-old season ==
During his five-year-old season, Bowl Game reeled off several grade one victories. He won the prestigious Washington, D.C. International Stakes at Laurel Park Racecourse in a tepid 2:51 over a very soft turf course. In July, he won the Arlington Handicap in Chicago and the Man O' War Stakes at 1 3/8 miles (2.2 km) on the turf at Belmont Park in 2:19.0. He also won the Joe Hirsch Turf Classic Invitational Handicap at Aqueduct Racetrack in 2:28.20 at a mile and a half. He finished his five-year-old season with a record of 5 wins, 2 seconds, and 2 thirds in 10 starts for earnings of $585,738.

As a six-year-old, he raced once, placing second in an allowance race at Belmont Park.

== Retirement ==
Bowl Game was euthanized November 10, 2006, due to old age: "He was out in the pasture and got two-thirds of the way up the hill and just lay down. He was in some distress, and it was clear to us that the time had come."
