= Paul Cavanagh =

English actor (1888–1964)

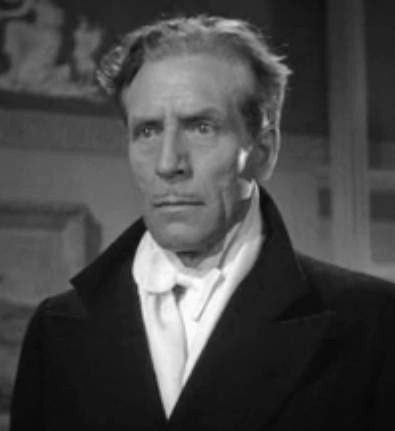
- Cavanagh in The Woman in Green, 1945
- Born: William Grigs Atkinson; 8 December 1888; Felling, County Durham, England
- Died: 15 March 1964 (aged 75); London, England
- Resting place: Lorraine Park Cemetery, Baltimore, Maryland
- Occupation: Actor
- Years active: 1928–1959
- Spouse: Catherine Layfield Luhn (1946–1964)
- Children: 1
- Military career
- Allegiance: United Kingdom
- Service years: 1914–1918
- Conflicts: First World War

William Grigs Atkinson (8 December 1888 – 15 March 1964), known professionally as Paul Cavanagh, was an English film and stage actor. He appeared in more than 100 films between 1928 and 1959.

== Life and career ==
Cavanagh was born in Felling, Durham. He attended the Royal Grammar School, Newcastle upon Tyne, and Emmanuel College, Cambridge, where he was an undergraduate student. Cavanagh studied law in England, earning a master of arts degree at Cambridge. A newspaper article published 17 June 1931, reported, "It is on record that Cavanagh won high honors in mathematics and history."

Cavanagh practised "for several years" before he changed professions. He went to Canada "for a year of sightseeing and wandering" before he joined and served nine months with the Royal North-West Mounted Police.

After serving in World War I, he returned to Canada, where he practised law, including revising the statutes of Alberta, but eventually went back to England to practise law. Cavanagh went onto the stage after a stroke of bad luck in 1924 caused him to lose his savings, and later he went into films.

In 1926, Cavanagh lost $22,000 in one evening on a roulette wheel in Monte Carlo. An observer offered to provide a letter "to some of my theatrical acquaintances" in London, England. Those contacts led to Cavanagh's role in Walter Hackett's It Pays to Advertise. He also appeared in Eden Phillpotts' Blue Comet in the West End.

After appearing in a handful of British silent films he moved to the United States. Cavanagh's first film contract and film came in 1929 with Paramount Pictures.

Cavanagh died in London from a heart attack in 1964, aged 75, and is buried in Lorraine Park Cemetery, Baltimore, Maryland.

== Filmography ==
- Two Little Drummer Boys (1928) as Capt. Darrell
- Tesha (1928) as Lenane
- The Runaway Princess (1929) as Prince of Savonia
- Strictly Unconventional (1930) as Ted
- Grumpy (1930) as Chamberlin Jarvis
- The Storm (1930) as Dave Stewart
- The Virtuous Sin (1930) as Capt. Orloff
- The Devil to Pay! (1930) as Grand Duke Paul
- Unfaithful (1931) as Ronald Killkerry
- Born to Love (1931) as Sir Wilfred Drake
- Always Goodbye (1931) as Reginald Armstrong, alias of Morgan
- Transgression (1931) as Robert Maury
- The Squaw Man (1931) as Henry - Earl of Kerhill
- Heartbreak (1931) as Captain Wolke
- Devil's Lottery (1932) as Major Hugo Beresford
- A Bill of Divorcement (1932) as Gray
- The Crash (1932) as Ronnie Sanderson
- Tonight Is Ours (1933) as Prince Keri of Zalgar
- Curtain at Eight (1933) as Wylie Thornton - Actor
- The Kennel Murder Case (1933) as Sir Thomas MacDonald
- The Sin of Nora Moran (1933) as Gov. Dick Crawford
- Uncertain Lady (1934) as Bruce King
- Tarzan and His Mate (1934) as Martin Arlington
- Shoot the Works (1934) as Alvin Ritchie
- The Notorious Sophie Lang (1934) as Max Bernard/Sir Nigel Crane
- One Exciting Adventure (1934) as Lavassor
- Menace (1934) as Col. Leonard Crecy
- Goin' to Town (1935) as Edward Carrington
- Escapade (1935)
- Without Regret (1935) as Robert Godfrey
- Thunder in the Night (1935) as Count Peter Alvinczy
- Splendor (1935) as Martin Deering
- Champagne Charlie (1936) as Charlie Cortland
- Crime Over London (1936) as Inspector Gary
- Cafe Colette (1937) as Ryan
- A Romance in Flanders (1937) as John Morley
- Within the Law (1939) as English Eddie
- The Under-Pup (1939) as Mr. Franklin Cooper
- Reno (1939) as John R. Banton
- I Take This Woman (1940) as Bill Rodgers
- The Case of the Black Parrot (1941) as Max Armand
- Maisie Was a Lady (1941) as 'Cap' Rawlston
- Shadows on the Stairs (1941) as Joseph Reynolds
- Passage from Hong Kong (1941) as Capt. Duncan MacNeil-Fraser
- Captains of the Clouds (1942) as Group Captain
- The Strange Case of Doctor Rx (1942) as John Crispin
- Pacific Rendezvous (1942) as Cmdr. Charles Brennan
- Eagle Squadron (1942) as Sir James Patridge
- The Hard Way (1943) as John 'Jack' Shagrue
- The Gorilla Man (1943) as Dr. Dorn
- Adventure in Iraq (1943) as Sheik Ahmid Bel Nor
- The Scarlet Claw (1944) as Lord Penrose
- Maisie Goes to Reno (1944) as Roger Pelham
- Marriage Is a Private Affair (1944) as Mr. Selworth
- This Man's Navy (1945) as Sir Anthony Tivall
- The Man in Half Moon Street (1945) as Dr. Henry Latimer
- The House of Fear (1945) as Simon Merrivale
- The Woman in Green (1945) as Fenwick
- Club Havana (1945) as Rogers
- Night in Paradise (1946) as Cleomenes
- Night and Day (1946) as Bart McClelland
- Wife Wanted (1946) as Jeffrey Caldwell
- The Verdict (1946) as Clive Russell
- Humoresque (1946) as Victor Wright
- Dishonored Lady (1947) as Victor Kranish
- Ivy (1947) as Dr. Berwick (uncredited)
- Secret Beyond the Door (1947) as Rick Barrett
- The Black Arrow (1948) as Sir John Sedley
- The Babe Ruth Story (1948) as Dr. Menzies
- You Gotta Stay Happy (1948) as Dr. Blucher
- Madame Bovary (1949) as Marquis D'Andervilliers
- The Iroquois Trail (1950) as Col. Eric Thorne
- Rogues of Sherwood Forest (1950) as Sir Giles
- Hi-Jacked (1950) as Hagen
- Hit Parade of 1951 (1950) as Two-to-One Thompson
- The Second Face (1950) as Todd Williams
- Tales of Robin Hood (1951) as Sir Gui de Clairmont
- Hollywood Story (1951) as Roland Paul
- The Highwayman (1951) (uncredited)
- The Desert Fox (1951) as Lt. Col. Caesar von Hofacker (uncredited)
- The Son of Dr. Jekyll (1951) as Insp. Stoddard
- Bride of the Gorilla (1951) as Klaas Van Gelder
- All That I Have (1951) as Dr. James Brady
- The Strange Door (1951) as Edmond de Maletroit
- Lady in the Iron Mask (1952) as Minor Role (uncredited)
- The Golden Hawk (1952) as Jeremy Smithers
- Plymouth Adventure (1952) as Governor John Carver (uncredited)
- The Mississippi Gambler (1953) as Edmond Dureau
- The Bandits of Corsica (1953) as Dianza
- House of Wax (1953) as Sidney Wallace
- Port Sinister (1953) as John Kolvac
- The Desert Rats (1953) as Colonel (uncredited)
- Flame of Calcutta (1953) as Lord Robert Clive
- All American (1953) as Professor Carl Banning
- Casanova's Big Night (1954) as Signor Alberto Di Gambetta
- The Iron Glove (1954) as Cavenly, advisor to Prince James
- Magnificent Obsession (1954) as Dr. Giraud
- The Law vs. Billy the Kid (1954) as John H. Tunstall
- The Raid (1954) as Col. Tucker
- Khyber Patrol (1954) as Brig. Gen. Melville
- Charade (1954) as Col. Heisler
- The Prodigal (1955) as Tobiah
- The Purple Mask (1955) as Duc de Latour
- The Scarlet Coat (1955) as Sir Henry Clinton
- The King's Thief (1955) as Sir Edward Scott
- Diane (1956) as Lord Bonnivet
- Women Without Men (1956) as Insp. D.N. Hedges (uncredited)
- Blonde Bait (1956) as Insp. D.N. Hedges
- Francis in the Haunted House (1956) as Neil Frazer
- The Man Who Turned to Stone (1957) as Cooper
- She Devil (1957) as Sugar Daddy
- God Is My Partner (1957) as Dr. James Brady
- In the Money (1958) as Inspector Herbert Saunders
- The Beat Generation (1959) as Will Belmont - Stan's Father (uncredited)
- The Four Skulls of Jonathan Drake (1959) as Kenneth Drake

=== Television ===
- Jungle Jim (1955–1956) as Commissioner Morrison in 8 episodes
- Lassie (1956) as Dr. Elwood Mason
- The Adventures of Jim Bowie (1956) as John Andrews
- Highway Patrol (American TV series)(1957) portrayed a vehicle thief
- Sergeant Preston of the Yukon (1957) as Sir Philip Northrup
- Perry Mason (1957-1959) as Edgar Ferrell/ Horace Selkirk
- Adventures of Superman (1958) as Delbert Carter
- Tombstone Territory (1958) as Banker Racklin
- Northwest Passage (1958) as Colonel George Clayton
- Walt Disney Presents (1960) as Governor Rutledge (uncredited)
- Have Gun - Will Travel (1960) as Windrom
