= William Pinkney Whyte =

American politician (1824–1908)

William Whyte
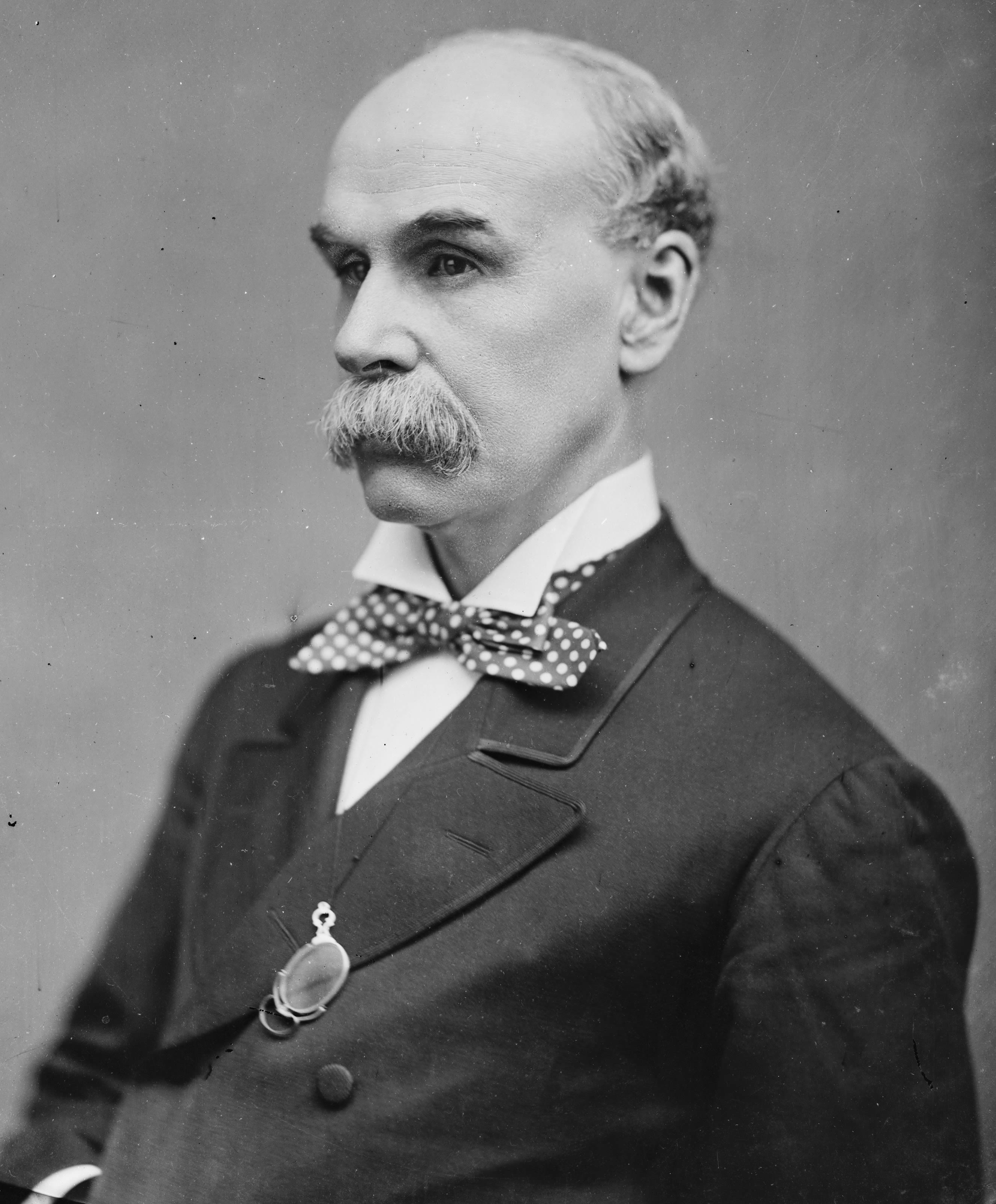

35th Governor of Maryland
- In office January 10, 1872 – March 4, 1874
- Preceded by: Oden Bowie
- Succeeded by: James B. Groome

United States Senator from Maryland
- In office June 8, 1906 – March 17, 1908
- Preceded by: Arthur Gorman
- Succeeded by: John Smith
- In office March 4, 1875 – March 3, 1881
- Preceded by: William Hamilton
- Succeeded by: Arthur Gorman
- In office July 13, 1868 – March 3, 1869
- Appointed by: Thomas Swann
- Preceded by: Reverdy Johnson
- Succeeded by: William Hamilton

Attorney General of Maryland
- In office 1887–1891
- Governor: Henry Lloyd; Elihu Emory Jackson
- Preceded by: Charles Boyle Roberts
- Succeeded by: John Prentiss Poe

28th Mayor of Baltimore
- In office 1881–1883
- Preceded by: Ferdinand Claiborne Latrobe
- Succeeded by: Ferdinand Claiborne Latrobe

Member of the Maryland House of Delegates
- In office 1847–1849

Personal details
- Born: August 9, 1824 Baltimore, Maryland, U.S.
- Died: March 17, 1908 (aged 83) Baltimore, Maryland, U.S.
- Resting place: Green Mount Cemetery
- Party: Democratic
- Spouse(s): Louisa Dorsey Hollingsworth; Mary McDonald Thomas
- Children: 4

William Pinkney Whyte (August 9, 1824 – March 17, 1908) was an American politician from Maryland, who served as a state delegate, the state comptroller, a United States senator, the 35th governor, the mayor of Baltimore, and the state attorney general.

== Early life and education ==
Whyte was born in Baltimore, Maryland, the son of Joseph and Isabella White (he later changed his surname to Whyte following a family disagreement). His paternal grandfather was the physician and exiled United Irishman, John Campbell White. His maternal grandfather, William Pinkney, was a politician, administrator, and diplomat.

Whyte's early education involved instruction by a private tutor, who had been personal secretary to Napoleon Bonaparte. From 1842 to 1844, Whyte was unable to attend college as a result of his family's poor financial situation, and began work at the banking firm of Peabody, Riggs and Co. in Baltimore. He began to study law in Baltimore at the law office of Brown and Brune for one year before being admitted to the law school of Harvard University in 1844. Whyte returned to Baltimore in 1845 for further study, and was admitted to the Bar soon after in 1846.

== Political career ==
From 1847 to 1849, Whyte served one term as a member of the Maryland House of Delegates. In 1850, Whyte was unsuccessful in a bid for election to the 32nd Congress. From 1853 to 1855, he served one term as Comptroller of the State Treasury of Maryland, for which he was credited for introducing a more simplified financial system to the State.

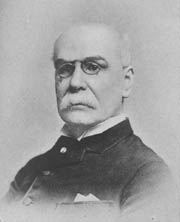
A later portrait of Whyte

In 1857, Whyte was again nominated to serve in Congress. He was defeated, but brought forth evidence before the House of Representatives of fraud and corruption regarding the election. The House did not concur on whether or not he should have been appointed, however.

After nearly a decade out of the political arena, Whyte was asked by then-governor Thomas Swann to fill the remainder of resigning senator Reverdy Johnson's term from July 13, 1868, to March 3, 1869. During his short tenure as senator, Whyte steadfastly supported the embattled President Andrew Johnson, and also supported easing the tension on the Southern states during Reconstruction. He chose not to be a candidate for re-election in 1868, however.

In 1871, Whyte was elected Governor of Maryland, defeating Republican challenger Jacob Tome. In the election of 1874, Whyte was elected by the legislature as a Democrat to the United States Senate and accordingly resigned from the position of governor. In 1874, in between his terms as governor and senator, he served as counsel for Maryland before the arbitration board in the boundary dispute between Virginia and Maryland. During this tenure as senator, Whyte opposed paying the nation's debt with silver and gold instead of solely gold, and served as the chairman of the U.S. Senate Committee on Printing (46th Congress). In the election of 1880, Whyte chose not to run for re-election, due to family illness.

Whyte was elected unopposed to be mayor of Baltimore in 1881. At the conclusion of his term in 1883, Whyte chose to go back to practicing law. From 1887 to 1891, Whyte was Attorney General of Maryland, and from 1900 to 1903, the Baltimore City Solicitor. In 1906, Whyte was appointed by Maryland Governor Edwin Warfield to fill the Senate seat vacancy caused by the death of Arthur P. Gorman. At 25 years, 3 months, 5 days since his last day in the chamber, Whyte's return set the all-time mark for the longest gap in service to the U.S. Senate.

Whyte served as senator until his unexpected death in Baltimore, and is buried in Green Mount Cemetery.

== See also ==
- List of members of the United States Congress who died in office (1900–1949)

== Sources ==
- United States Congress. "William Pinkney Whyte (id: W000435)". Biographical Directory of the United States Congress.
- Frank F. White, Jr., The Governors of Maryland 1777-1970 (Annapolis: The Hall of Records Commission, 1970), 179–183.
- William Pinkney Whyte, late a senator from Maryland, Memorial addresses delivered in the House of Representatives and Senate frontispiece 1909

Party political offices
Preceded by Oden Bowie	Democratic nominee for Governor of Maryland; 1871	Succeeded by John Lee Carroll
Political offices
Preceded by Henry E. Bateman	Comptroller of Maryland; 1854–1856	Succeeded by William Henry Purnell
Preceded by Oden Bowie	Governor of Maryland; 1872–1874	Succeeded by James B. Groome
Preceded by Ferdinand Claiborne Latrobe	Mayor of Baltimore; 1881–1883	Succeeded by Ferdinand Claiborne Latrobe
U.S. Senate
Preceded by Reverdy Johnson	U.S. senator (Class 1) from Maryland; 1868–1869; Served alongside: George Vickers	Succeeded by William T. Hamilton
Preceded by William Hamilton	U.S. senator (Class 1) from Maryland; 1875–1881; Served alongside: George R. Dennis, James Groome	Succeeded by Arthur Gorman
Preceded by Arthur P. Gorman	U.S. senator (Class 3) from Maryland; 1906–1908; Served alongside: Isidor Rayner	Succeeded by John W. Smith
Legal offices
Preceded by Charles Boyle Roberts	Attorney General of Maryland; 1887–1891	Succeeded by John Prentiss Poe
