= Dungannon (horse) =

British-bred Thoroughbred racehorse

- Country: England
- Owner: George Hume Steuart

Major wins
- Annapolis Subscription Plate (1743)

Awards
- Annapolis Subscription Plate

Dungannon, (aka "Duncannon"), was a thoroughbred racehorse owned by the tobacco planter and horse breeder George Hume Steuart (1700–1784), who imported the horse from England to race against his rival, Charles Carroll of Annapolis (1703–1783). Dungannon won the Annapolis Subscription Plate, in May 1743, the first recorded formal horse race in colonial Maryland, and the second oldest in North America.

== History ==
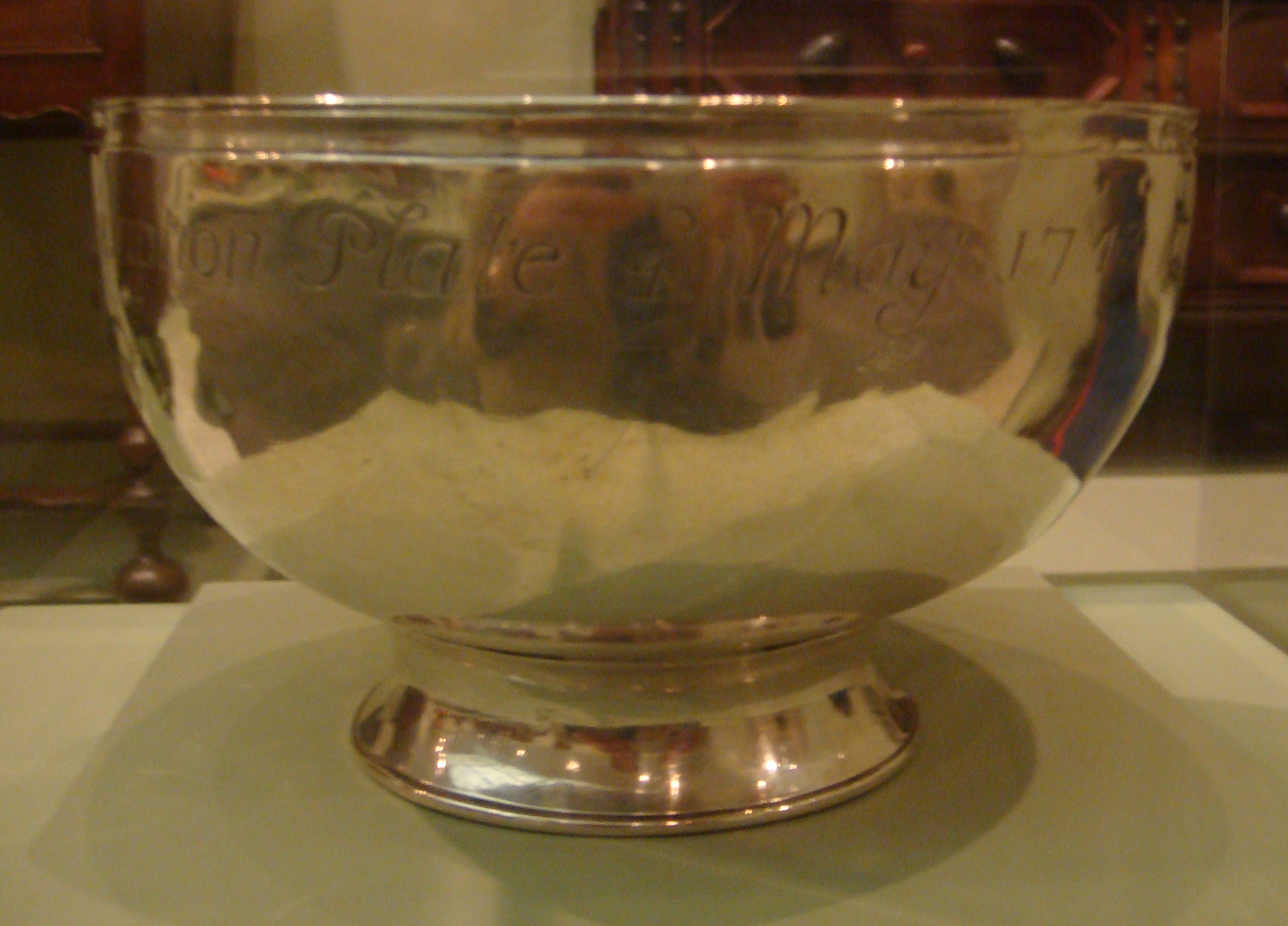
The Annapolis Subscription Plate won by Dungannon, said to be the oldest surviving silver object made in Maryland.

The Annapolis Subscription Plate was held in May 1743 at Parole, Maryland, near Annapolis, on the South River, at a site which eventually became the Parole Hunt Club. Charles Carroll of Annapolis (whose son, Charles Carroll of Carrollton, would later sign the Declaration of Independence in 1776) had wagered Steuart that his horse would win in a 3-mile race. In the 1740s racing was established in almost every large town in Maryland, with many gentlemen of means establishing large studs. The Maryland Jockey Club was founded in Annapolis in 1743, and racing soon came to form an important part of the social and political life of the colony.

At stake was the Annapolis Subscription Plate, today the oldest surviving silver object made in Maryland and the second oldest horseracing trophy in America. The silver plate itself - in reality more of a bowl than a plate - was donated to the Baltimore Museum of Art by Mrs Alice Key Montell and Mrs Sarah Steuart Hartshorne, where it is now on display. It was crafted by the Annapolis silversmith John Inch (1721–1763).

== Legacy ==
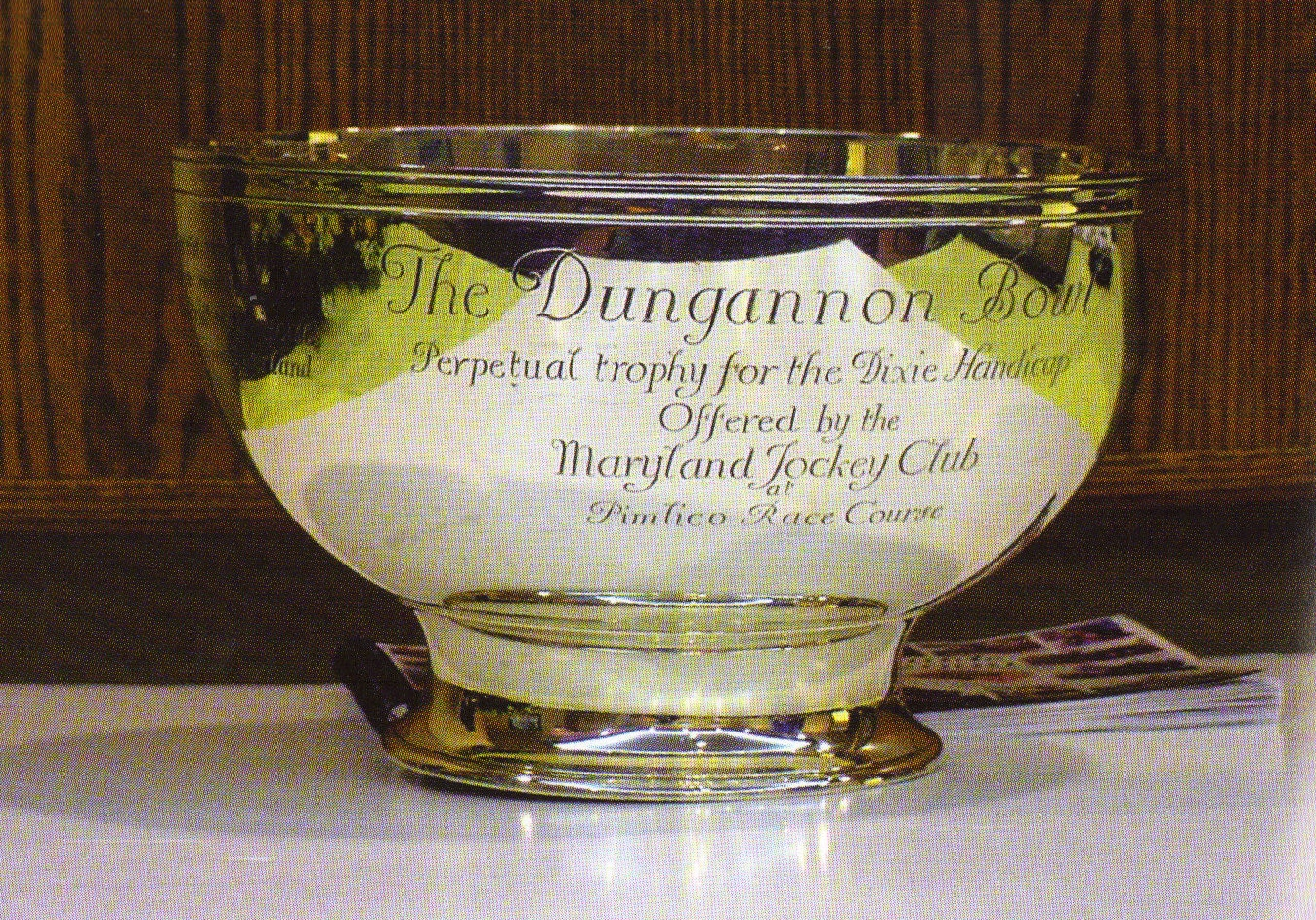
"The Dungannon Bowl", a replica of the original Annapolis Subscription Plate, is presented to the winner of annual Dixie Stakes

A solid silver replica of similar weight and dimensions mirroring the original Annapolis Subscription Plate was commissioned in 1955 by the Maryland Jockey Club. The replica, known as "The Dungannon Bowl", is a perpetual trophy given annually to the winner of the Dixie Stakes, the oldest stakes race run in Maryland and the Mid-Atlantic states.

The Annapolis Subscription Plate has also been revived in recent years by the descendants of Dungannon's former owner, Dr George Hume Steuart, who still live at Steuart's former tobacco plantation, Dodon, today. The commemorative race was held at Roedown Farm, Davidsonville, Maryland in 2010.

== See also ==
- Annapolis Subscription Plate
- George H. Steuart (planter)
- Dodon
- Maryland Jockey Club
- Selima (horse)
