= Parading (horse) =

American-bred Thoroughbred racehorse

- Sire: Pulpit
- Grandsire: A.P. Indy
- Dam: On Parade
- Damsire: Storm Cat
- Sex: Stallion
- Foaled: 2003
- Country: United States
- Colour: Chestnut
- Breeder: Phipps Stable
- Owner: Phipps Stable
- Trainer: Claude R. McGaughey III
- Record: 21: 7-5-2
- Earnings: $530,046

Major wins
- Dixie Stakes (2009); Ben Ali Stakes (2009); Volponi SStakes (2008)
- Last updated on June 4, 2011

Parading (foaled March 23, 2003) is an American Thoroughbred racehorse. Bred and owned by Phipps Stable in Kentucky, he is a son of the leading stallion Pulpit, who in turn was sired by Hall of Famer and prominent sire A.P. Indy. He was out of the mare On Parade by perennial leading stallion Storm Cat.

Trained by Shug McGaughey, Parading is best known as the turf racing specialist who won the grade-two Dixie Stakes at Pimlico Race Course on May 16, 2009.

== Five-year-old season ==
After winning two of his first three starts in 2008. Shug McGauhey decided to try stakes company and ran Parading in the Volponi Stakes. In that race, Parading won handily on a yielding turf course at Belmont Park over Strike a Deal and Tam Lin in 1:49.39 for a mile and an eighth.

== Six-year-old season ==
As a six-year-old Parading blossomed into a very good runner winning two graded stakes wins. In April, 2009 Parading won the grade three $150,000 Ben Ali Stakes at Keeneland Race Course in Lexington, Kentucky, on Keeneland's synthetic main track.

In his next start his connections Phipps Stable and Shug McGaughey decided to send him to the Grade II $200,000 Dixie Stakes at Pimlico Race Course on the Preakness Stakes undercard. In the Dixie, Parading broke from gate number three under jockey Kent Desormeaux as the 2-1 favorite in the field of twelve stakes horses. Around the first turn and through the back stretch German stakes winner Lauro (at 17-1) led through fractions of 24.6 for the first quarter and 48.7 for the half. Parading stalked the pace in fourth just off the outside flank of Blue Grass Stakes winner Monba. Rounding the final turn, Parading made a bold move fanning out four wide and passing the two leaders in an instant. Coming down the lane Parading drew off to a two length lead but then had to fight off a challenge by Just As Well and won. He won in a final time of 1:48.28 for the mile and one eighth race on the firm turf course.

== Retirement ==
After the 2009 racing season Parading was retired he is presently standing for stud in 2010 and after at Claiborne Farm in Paris, Kentucky. He is now taken care of by Johnny “Thunder” Franklin.
