= Cornelius Leary =

American politician (1813–1893)

Member of the U.S. House of Representatives from Maryland's 3rd district
- In office March 4, 1861 – March 3, 1863
- Preceded by: J. Morrison Harris
- Succeeded by: Henry Winter Davis

Member of the Maryland House of Delegates
- In office 1838–1839

Personal details
- Born: Cornelius Lawrence Ludlow Leary; October 22, 1813 Baltimore, Maryland, U.S.
- Died: March 21, 1893 (aged 79) Baltimore, Maryland, U.S.
- Resting place: Lorraine Park Cemetery
- Party: Unionist
- Other political affiliations: Know Nothing; Whig
- Spouse(s): Jane Maria Phillips (m. 1839; died 1863) Rebecca E. Horton (m. 1866)
- Children: 10, including Richard
- Profession: Politician; lawyer

Cornelius Lawrence Ludlow Leary (October 22, 1813 – March 21, 1893) was an American politician and lawyer from Maryland. He served as a member of the Maryland House of Delegates from 1838 to 1839. He later served as a member of the United States House of Representatives, representing Maryland's 3rd district from 1861 to 1863.

== Early life ==
Cornelius Lawrence Ludlow Leary was born on October 22, 1813, in Baltimore, Maryland, to Peter Leary. His father was one of the founders of Maryland public schools. Leary attended public schools. He graduated from St. Mary's College of Baltimore in 1833, and afterwards moved to Louisville, Kentucky. He later studied law and was admitted to the bar in 1840.

== Career ==
Leary returned to Baltimore in 1837, and served as a Whig member of the Maryland House of Delegates, representing Baltimore, in 1838 and 1839. Following his law degree, he began practicing law in Baltimore. His law office was at the corner of Bond Street and Eastern Avenue. He then practiced on East Lexington Street for the remainder of his law career. He was also a presidential elector on Maryland's American Party ticket in 1856.

Leary was elected as a Unionist to the Thirty-seventh Congress, where he served from March 4, 1861, to March 3, 1863. After his term in Congress, he resumed the practice of law in Baltimore. He was a solicitor of Baltimore from 1865 to 1867. In 1867, he ran for a judgeship, but lost that election.

== Personal life ==
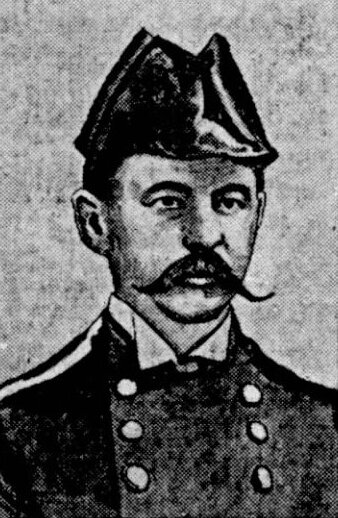
Sketch of son Richard Phillips Leary

Leary married Jane Maria Phillips on November 26, 1839. His wife died in 1863. He later married Rebecca E. Horton on January 16, 1866. He had 10 children, Peter Jr., Richard Phillips, Mary C., Thomas H., William, Emily Jane, Ann Eliza, Annie A., Florence, and Jane. His son Peter was a brigadier general of the U.S. Army. His son Richard was a naval commander.

Leary died on March 21, 1893, at his Harlem Avenue home in Baltimore. He was buried in Lorraine Park Cemetery.

U.S. House of Representatives
Preceded by J. Morrison Harris	Member of the U.S. House of Representatives from Maryland's 3rd congressional district 1861–1863	Succeeded by Henry Winter Davis
