= Charles Carroll of Annapolis =

American planter and lawyer (1702–1782)

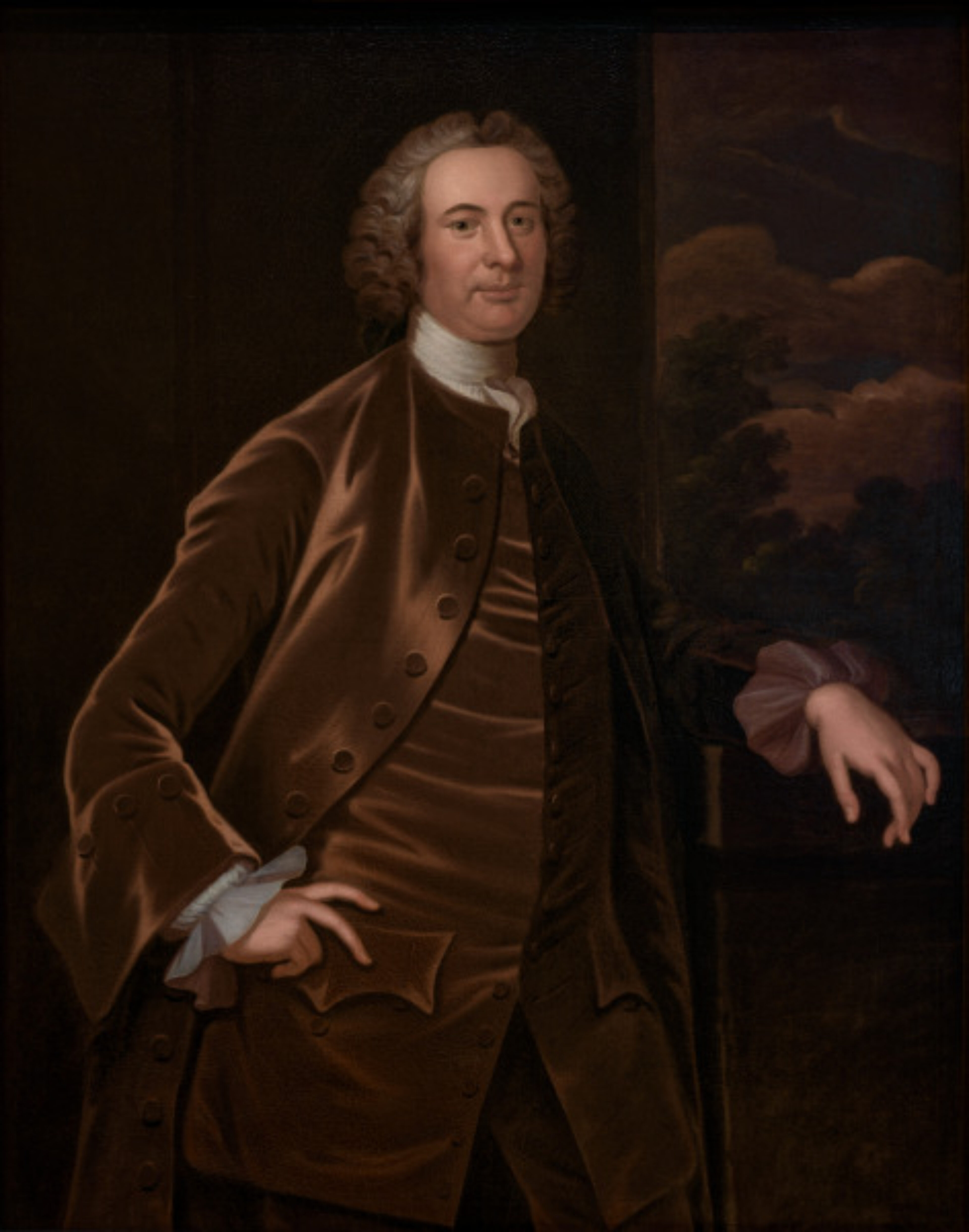
- Portrait by John Wollaston, 1753–1754
- Born: April 2, 1702; Annapolis, Maryland
- Died: May 20, 1782 (aged 80)
- Occupation: Planter

Charles Carroll II (April 2, 1702 – May 30, 1782) known as Charles Carroll of Annapolis to distinguish him from his similarly named relatives, was a wealthy Maryland planter and lawyer. His father was Charles Carroll the Settler, (I – the first), (1661–1720), an immigrant to Maryland who had arrived in the colony in 1689 with a commission as Provincial Attorney General, and had accumulated a vast fortune, emerging as Maryland's wealthiest citizen. Charles Carroll of Annapolis inherited and extended his father's fortune but, as a Roman Catholic, was barred from participation in Maryland politics. It would fall to his son, Charles Carroll of Carrollton, (III), (1737–1832), one of the signers (and the longest-lived) of the Declaration of Independence, to see religious toleration restored to Maryland and many political and scientific/technological advances in the newly independent state.

== Early life ==
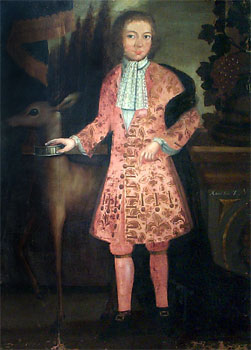
Charles Carroll of Annapolis as a child, c. 1712, painted by Justus Engelhardt Kühn

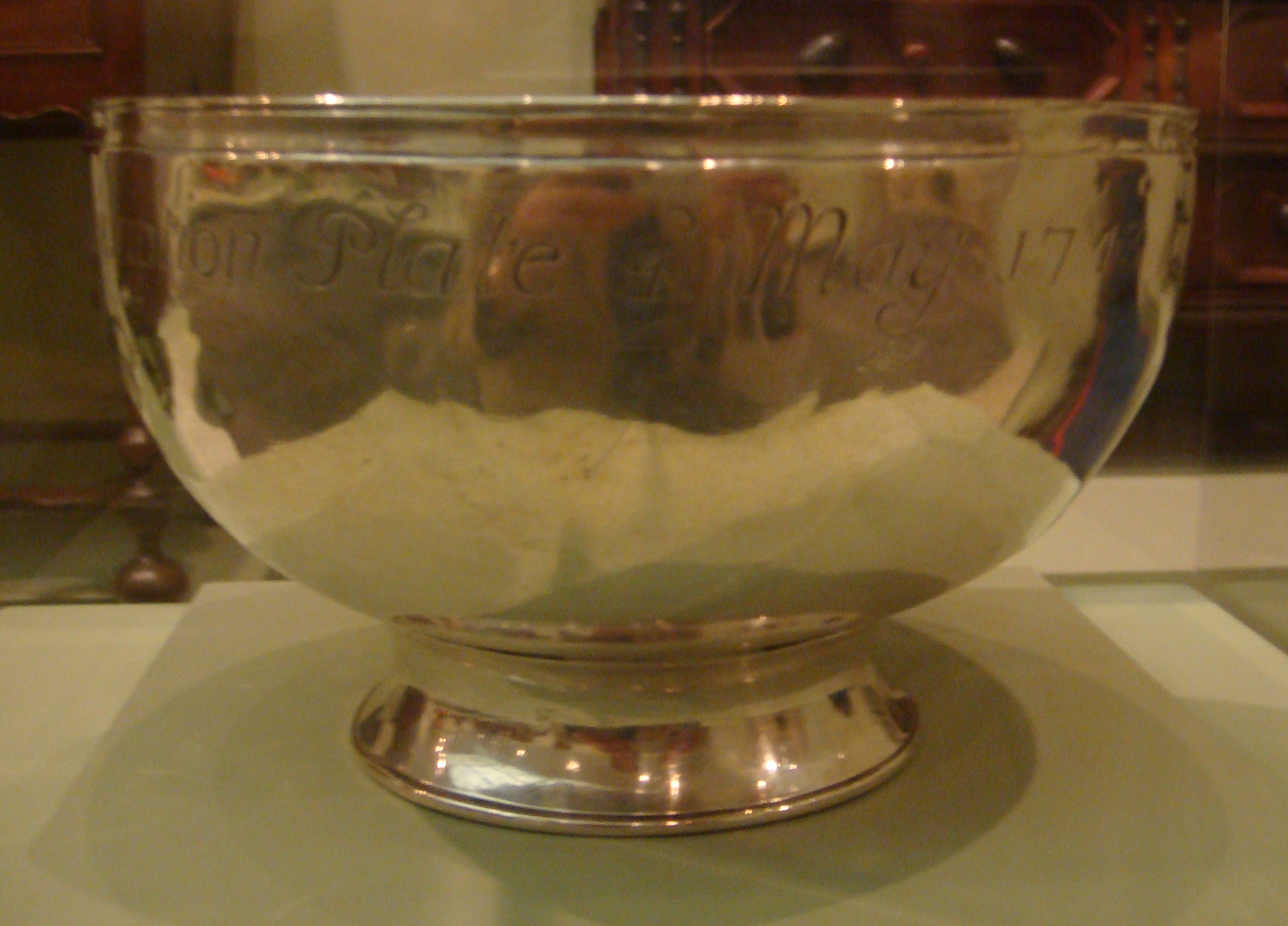
Carroll's horses competed to win the Annapolis Subscription Plate, the first recorded formal horse race in Maryland.

Carroll was born in Annapolis, Maryland, in 1702, the third child and second son of Charles Carroll the Settler and Mary Darnall, daughter of the wealthy Roman Catholic planter Henry Darnall, a strong ally of the Carrolls and the ruling Calvert family. His older brother Henry died shortly before their father, in 1719.

Charles Carroll the Settler came to the colony in 1688 with a commission as Attorney General from the colony's Catholic proprietor, Charles Calvert, 3rd Baron Baltimore, but after only a year lost that position as a result of the Province's so-called "Protestant Revolution", a rebellion of Protestant settlers associated with the Glorious Revolution in England. The royal government that took over the Colony, after moving the founding capital from the Catholic stronghold of St. Mary's City on the shores of the Potomac and Chesapeake in southern Maryland to the more central and renamed Annapolis near Kent Island in 1694; banned Catholics from holding office, bearing arms, serving on juries, and eventually from voting. Barred therefore from a political career, Carroll the Settler turned his attention to business, amassing a fortune so large that he was eventually the wealthiest man in Maryland at the time of his death in 1720. Thus, while the younger Carroll was born into a religious minority with few rights, he had all the advantages that wealth could provide.

Like many sons of wealthy Marylanders, Carroll was sent to England to study law, but he returned to Maryland on his father's death in 1722 in order to inherit the family estates.

== Religion and family life ==
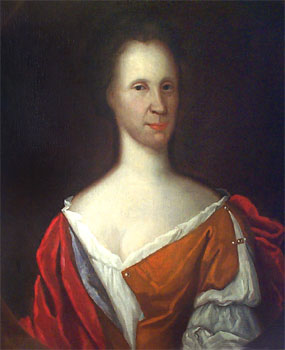
Carroll's mother, Mary Darnall Carroll

In around 1726 Carroll began courting Elizabeth Brooke, the daughter of Clement Brooke and Jane Sewall. They were not married, however, until 1757, when their son Charles was twenty years old. It's unclear why they waited so long; it may have had something to do with Maryland inheritance laws.

The Carroll family were enthusiastic horse breeders and raced thoroughbreds, competing with other well-to-do families at annual racing events, which also formed an important part of the social and political life of the colony. Charles Carroll of Annapolis's horse was beaten in 1743 by George Hume Steuart's "Dungannon" in the Annapolis Subscription Plate, the first recorded formal horse race in Maryland. The plate itself (actually more of a bowl than a plate) now forms part of the collection of the Baltimore Museum of Art, (established 1914) [mostly modern art collections].

== Legacy ==
Like his father, Charles Carroll of Annapolis never gave up hope of overcoming Maryland's religious intolerance. His son Charles Carroll of Carrollton, (1737–1832), eventually secured his family's vision of personal, political and religious freedoms for all citizens when he became the only Roman Catholic (and last surviving signer) to sign the Declaration of Independence in 1776, while becoming the richest man in America and having a profound effect on his nation, state and city.

The Charles Carroll House, with its manicured gardens on Duke of Gloucester Street, was one of the Carroll family's substantial Eighteenth Century homes. Today, it is one of Annapolis's landmark museum houses.

== See also ==
- Colonial families of Maryland
- Carroll family
