= Crickmore =

Crickmore is a surname. Notable people with the surname include:

- Charlie Crickmore (1942–2018), English footballer
- Conor Crickmore (born 1970), American farmer, educator, and tool designer

== See also ==
- John Crickmere (1822–1846), English steeplechase jockey
