= Oden Bowie =

American politician (1826–1894)

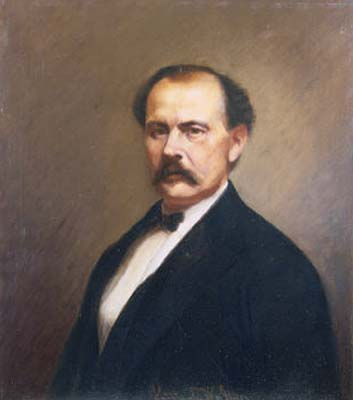

34th Governor of Maryland
- In office January 13, 1869 – January 10, 1872
- Preceded by: Thomas Swann
- Succeeded by: William Pinkney Whyte

Maryland State Senator
- In office 1867–1869

Member of Maryland House of Delegates
- In office 1849–1867

Personal details
- Born: November 10, 1826 Collington, Maryland, U.S.
- Died: December 4, 1894 (aged 68) Collington, Maryland, U.S.
- Party: Democratic
- Spouse: Alice Carter (married 1851)
- Children: 7
- Parent: William Duckett Bowie (father)
- Relatives: Reginald Bowie (cousin)

Military service
- Branch/service: United States Army
- Years of service: 1845–1847
- Rank: Captain
- Unit: Regiment of Voltigeurs and Foot Riflemen
- Battles/wars: Mexican–American War • Battle of Monterey

Oden Bowie (November 10, 1826 – December 4, 1894) was an American politician who served as the 34th governor of the State of Maryland from 1869 to 1872. He was a member of the Democratic Party.

== Early life ==
He was born in 1826 at Fairview Plantation in Collington, Maryland, the oldest son of Colonel William Duckett Bowie and Eliza Mary Oden.

He spent the bulk of his childhood at Fairview where he was educated by a private tutor until his mother died when he was nine years old. After his mother's death, he was sent to the preparatory department of St. John's College in Annapolis, Maryland, where he studied for three years. At age twelve, he enrolled in St. Mary's Seminary and University and graduated in July 1845 as valedictorian of his class.

== Career ==
=== Military ===
In 1846 Bowie enlisted in the U.S. Army as a private at the outbreak of the Mexican–American War. He was promoted through the ranks, cited with "conspicuous bravery at Monterey" by Captain Taylor and eventually promoted to the rank of Captain by President James K. Polk, serving in the Voltigeur Regiment. At the time he was the youngest Captain in the army.

=== Politics ===
In 1849, he was elected to his first political office, as a member of the Maryland House of Delegates, followed by the Maryland Senate from 1867 to 1869. On November 5, 1867, he became the first governor of Maryland to be elected under the post-Civil War Maryland Constitution of 1867, and as such, he did not assume the office of governor until January 13, 1869. Bowie's term of governor ended on January 10, 1872, ending his career in politics.

=== Railroading ===
Walter Bowie was a major advocate of expanding the railroad system into southern Maryland, and wrote articles lobbying for this under the pen name "Patuxent Planter". After significant lobbying together with Thomas Fielder Bowie, William Duckett Bowie, and Oden Bowie, the Baltimore and Potomac Railroad Company was organized. Two of the charter members were Walter Bowie and Thomas F Bowie. Directors included William Duckett Bowie and Oden. Oden became the first president of the Baltimore and Potomac Railroad around 1853 and also president of the Baltimore City Passenger Railway in 1873.

=== Thoroughbred racing ===
Oden Bowie was an avid horseman who served for nineteen years as President of the Pimlico Jockey Club, and as President of the Maryland Jockey Club. At Fairview Plantation he bred Thoroughbred racehorses. Among his successful runners, Crickmore was voted the retrospective American Champion Two-Year-Old Colt of 1880.

In 1868, at a dinner party in Saratoga Springs, New York, Bowie and associates agreed to hold a horse race in 1870 for the yearlings owned by attendees at the party. A wager was placed and the winner of the race would host the losers for dinner. Both Saratoga and the American Jockey Club made bids for the event, but Bowie pledged to build a grand racetrack in his home state if the race were to be run in Baltimore. The Dixie Stakes, (also known as the Dinner Party Stakes) and Pimlico Race Course were the results.

=== Slavery ===
Before the Civil War, Fairview had many slaves. Charles Branch Clark wrote in 1946 in the Maryland Historical Magazine that 70 of Bowie's slaves enlisted in the Union Army.

== Family and private life ==
Bowie spent most of his life at Fairview Plantation. He married Alice Carter on December 3, 1851. She was the daughter of Charles H. Carter and Rosalie Eugenia Calvert Carter of Goodwood, Prince George's County. Alice's mother was a descendant of George Calvert, 1st Baron Baltimore the first colonial proprietor of the Province of Maryland. His cousin was state delegate Reginald Bowie.

== Death ==
Bowie died after a brief illness on December 4, 1894, and was buried at Fairview.

== Legacy ==
- The city of Bowie, Maryland, was founded as Huntington in 1870 at a junction of the Baltimore and Potomac Railroad. The town was renamed Bowie in the 1880s after Governor Oden Bowie.
- Odenton, Maryland, began as a junction of the Baltimore and Potomac Railroad and the Annapolis and Elk Ridge Railroad, named after Oden Bowie in 1872.
- A 1,800-home subdivision, Fairwood, was built on the land of Oden Bowie's thousand acre plantation, Fairview, in Prince George's County, Maryland. The Fairwood community, which was approximately 73% African American in 2015, was heavily impacted by the Subprime mortgage crisis of 2007–2008, despite its affluence. Bowie descendants lived in the large Federal-style plantation house until 2015.

Party political offices
Preceded by Ezekiel F. Chambers	Democratic nominee for Governor of Maryland; 1867	Succeeded by William Pinkney Whyte
Political offices
Preceded by Thomas Swann	Governor of Maryland; 1869–1872	Succeeded by William Pinkney Whyte
