= Montpelier, Maryland =

Unincorporated community in Maryland, United States

Montpelier
- Unincorporated community
- Location in Maryland Montpelier (the United States)
- Coordinates: 39°03′41″N 76°51′03″W
- Country: United States
- State: Maryland
- County: Prince George's
- Built: late 1960s

Government
  - Type: Homeowners' association
  - President: Bob Derrick
- Elevation: 161 ft (49 m)
- Time zone: UTC−05:00 (EST)
  - Summer (DST): UTC−04:00 (EDT)
- GNIS feature ID: 597764
- Website: www.montpelieronline.org

Montpelier, Prince George's County, Maryland, United States, (ZIP Codes 20708, 20709) is a suburban community outside the corporate boundaries of Laurel. Located near the Baltimore–Washington Parkway, it was built in the 1960s and early 1970s by Levitt & Sons. There are four models of houses in the Levitt style, with mirror images giving eight different floor plans.

The Montpelier area has a history dating back to 1685, when it was part of a land grant given to Richard Snowden, Sr. by Lord Baltimore. Richard Snowden arrived in Maryland as an indentured servant and eventually became one of the largest landowners. The Snowden family built and lived in the Montpelier Mansion which remains a symbol of their success, financially and socially.

The Montpelier community is a Planned Unit Development (PUD) and as such it has registered covenants and restrictions as set forth in Governing Documents dated January 1998. The purpose of these covenants is to provide a structured means of maintaining standards.
