= Annapolis Subscription Plate =

First recorded formal horse race in Maryland, US

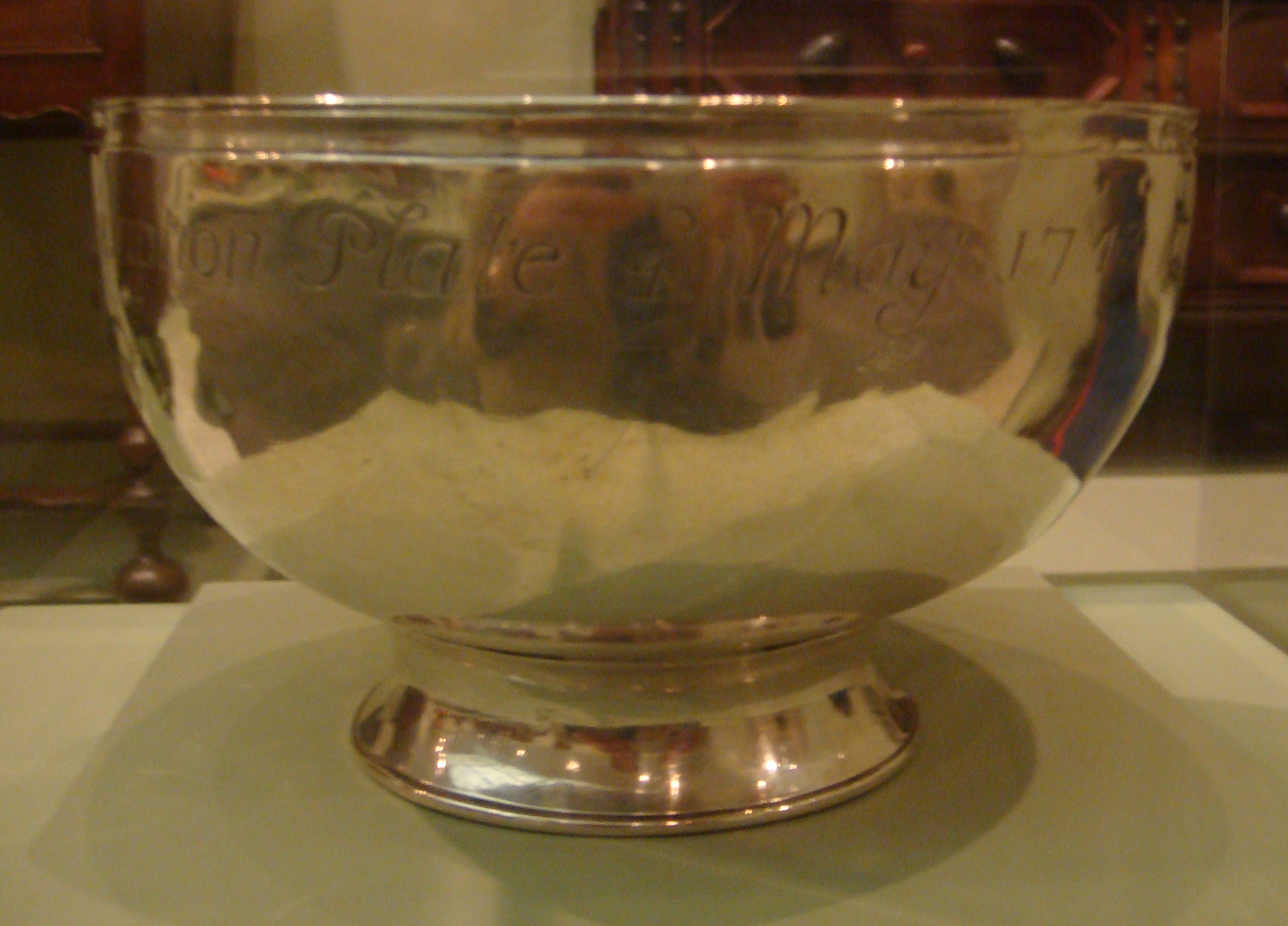
- The Annapolis Subscription Plate
- Sport: Horse racing
- Founded: 1743
- Claim to fame: First recorded formal horse race in colonial Maryland
- Country: Maryland
- Most recent champion: Dungannon

The Annapolis Subscription Plate is the name given both to the first recorded formal horse race in colonial Maryland and to the silver trophy awarded to the winner of the race. It is the second oldest known horse racing trophy in America.

== History ==
The race took place on the South river near Annapolis in May 1743.Charles Carroll (1703–1783) - whose son, also called Charles Carroll, would later sign the Declaration of Independence in 1776 - wagered that his horse would win in a 3-mile race.

Carroll's rival was Dungannon, owned by the tobacco planter and horse breeder George Hume Steuart who imported the thoroughbred from England. The race was held at Parole, Maryland, at what would later become the Parole Hunt Club. Dungannon won the race, establishing a tradition of horse racing at Parole that would last until the club's sale and redevelopment as a shopping center in 1962.

The silver plate itself - in reality more of a bowl than a plate - is now displayed in the Baltimore Museum of Art, and was made by the Annapolis silversmith John Inch (1721–1763). Punch bowls were popular as racing trophies in the 18th century. It is the oldest surviving silver object made in the state of Maryland, the oldest horseracing trophy in North America and the second oldest trophy of any kind on the continent.

Racing was suspended during the American Revolution, but a meeting of the Jockey Club took place on Saturday, March 1, 1783, at Mr Mann's tavern in Annapolis, at which a number of Dr Steuart's descendants were present. Club rules were set down including that the plate given by the club should be run on the first Tuesday of November, at Annapolis, that the prize money should be "sixty guineas", and that the annual subscription should be "three guineas".

== Modern era ==
The original plate was donated to the Baltimore Museum of Art by Mrs Alice Key Montell and Mrs Sarah Steuart Hartshorne. A solid silver replica of similar weight and dimensions mirroring the original Annapolis Subscription Plate was commissioned in 1955 by the Maryland Jockey Club.

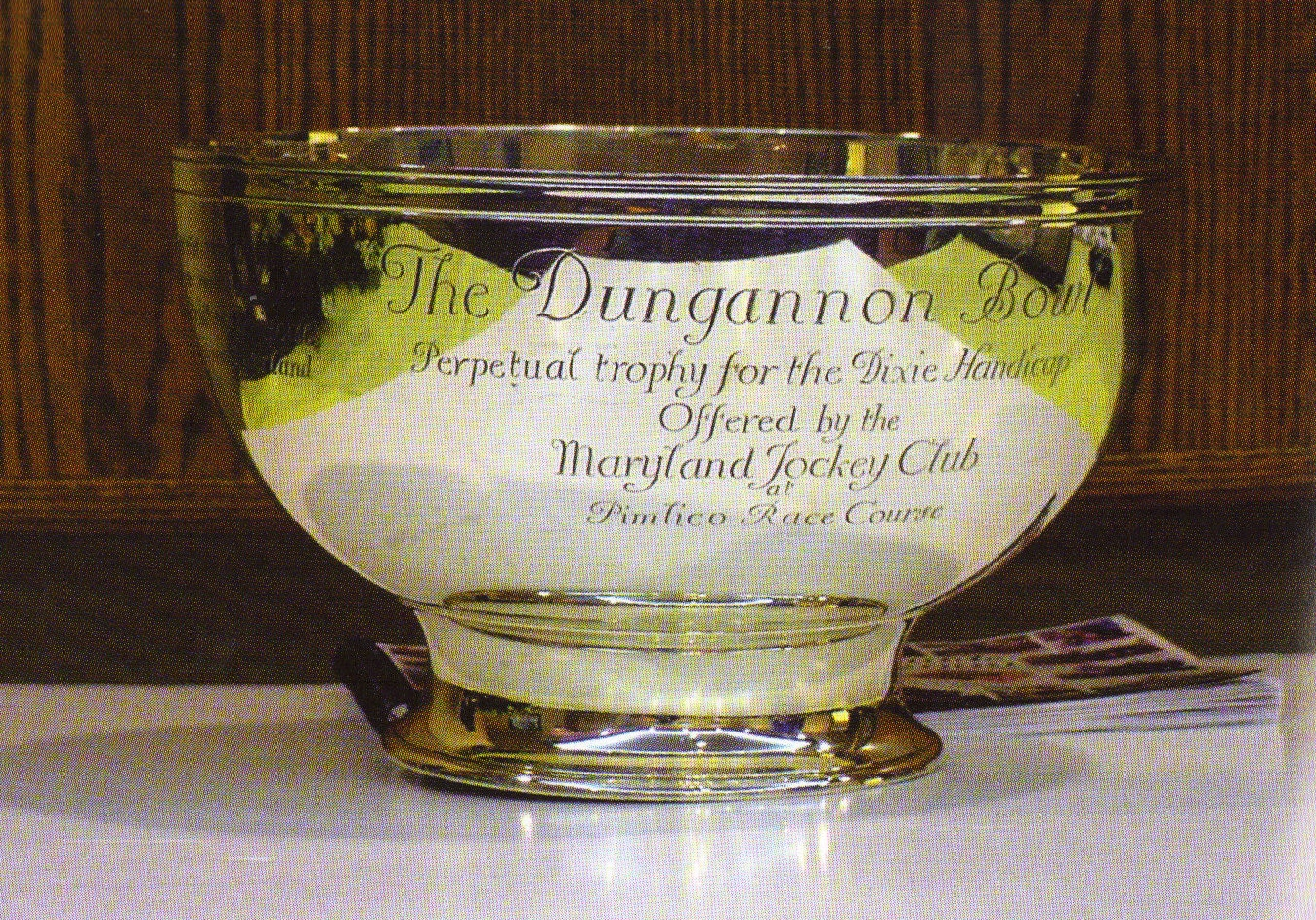
"The Dungannon Bowl" is presented to the winner of annual Dixie Stakes

That replica, "The Dungannon Bowl", is a perpetual trophy given annually to the winner of the Dixie Stakes, the oldest stakes race run in Maryland and the Mid-Atlantic states.

The race has been revived in certain recent years by the descendants of Dr Steuart, who still live at Dodon today.

== See also ==
- Maryland Jockey Club
