= Quiet Resolve =

Canadian-bred Thoroughbred racehorse

- Sire: Affirmed
- Grandsire: Exclusive Native
- Dam: Quiet Cleo
- Damsire: No Louder
- Sex: Gelding
- Foaled: 1995
- Country: Canada
- Colour: Bay
- Breeder: Sam-Son Farm
- Owner: Sam-Son Farm
- Trainer: Mark Frostad
- Record: 31: 10- 6-4
- Earnings: $2,346,768

Major wins
- Atto Mile Stakes (1999); Hong Kong Jockey Club Trophy Stakes (2000); Dixie Stakes (2000); King Edward Breeders' Cup Handicap (2001); Connaught Cup Stakes (2002)

Awards
- Canadian Champion Male Turf Horse (2000); Canadian Horse of the Year (2000)
- Last updated on July 31, 2008

Quiet Resolve (1995–2007) was a Canadian Thoroughbred racehorse foaled in Ontario who was voted the 2000 Canadian Horse of the Year. A turf specialist, the son of U.S. Triple Crown Champion Affirmed set a new track record for 8.5 furlongs at Keeneland Race Course. In his 2000 Champion season, Quiet Resolve won races in Canada and the United States and ran second to Kalanisi in the 2000 Breeders' Cup Turf at Churchill Downs.

Quiet Resolve was retired in October 2002 following a training injury. He had to be euthanized on February 1, 2007, after colic surgery at the Ontario Veterinary College hospital at the University of Guelph. He was buried at Sam-Son Farm near Milton, Ontario. In 2017, Quiet Resolve was posthumously inducted into the Canadian Horse Racing Hall of Fame.

== Pedigree ==
Pedigree of Quiet Resolve, bay gelding, 1995
Sire Affirmed	Exclusive Native	Raise a Native	Native Dancer
Sire Affirmed	Exclusive Native	Raise a Native	Raise You
Sire Affirmed	Exclusive Native	Exclusive	Shut Out
Sire Affirmed	Exclusive Native	Exclusive	Good Example
Sire Affirmed	Won't Tell You	Crafty Admiral	Fighting Fox
Sire Affirmed	Won't Tell You	Crafty Admiral	Admiral's Lady
Sire Affirmed	Won't Tell You	Scarlet Ribbon	Volcanic
Sire Affirmed	Won't Tell You	Scarlet Ribbon	Native Valor
Dam Quiet Cleo	No Louder	Nodouble	Noholme
Dam Quiet Cleo	No Louder	Nodouble	Abla-Jay
Dam Quiet Cleo	No Louder	Loudrangle	Quadrangle
Dam Quiet Cleo	No Louder	Loudrangle	Lady Known as Lou
Dam Quiet Cleo	Queen of Egypt	Vice Regent	Northern Dancer
Dam Quiet Cleo	Queen of Egypt	Vice Regent	Victoria Regina
Dam Quiet Cleo	Queen of Egypt	Forleana	Forum
Dam Quiet Cleo	Queen of Egypt	Forleana	Oleana (family: 2-h)
