= Dinner Party Stakes =

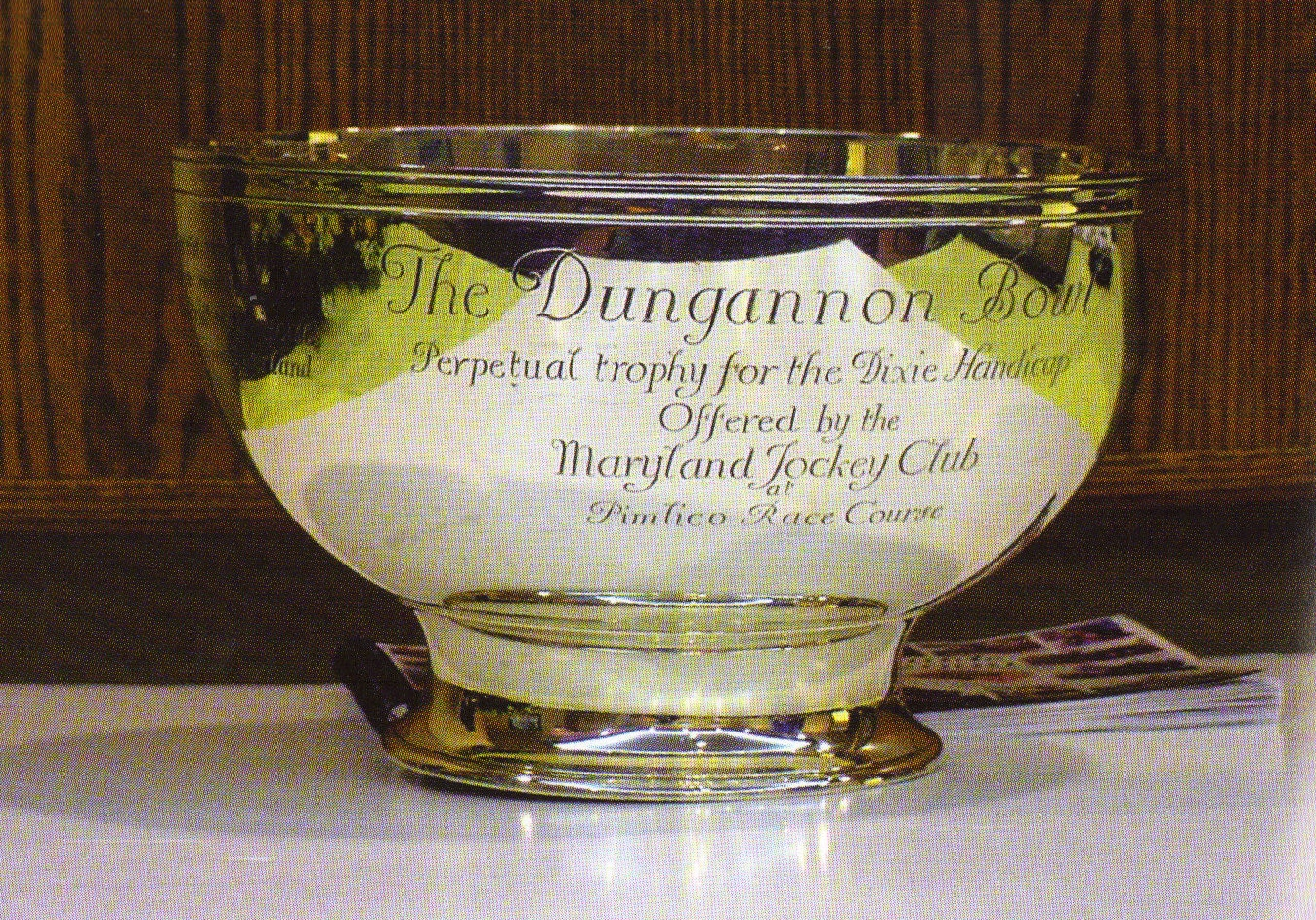
- The Dungannon Bowl, a 1955 replica of the original Annapolis Subscription Plate, awarded to the winner of the annual Dinner Party Stakes
- Class: Grade III
- Location: Pimlico Race Course; Baltimore, Maryland, United States
- Inaugurated: 1870
- Race type: Thoroughbred – Flat racing
- Website: www.pimlico.com

Race information
- Distance: 1 1/8 miles (9 furlongs)
- Surface: Turf
- Track: Left-handed
- Qualification: Three-years-old & up
- Weight: Base weights with allowances: 4-year-olds and up: 126 lbs. 3-year-olds: 119 lbs.
- Purse: US$250,000 (2025)

The Dinner Party Stakes is an American Thoroughbred horse race held annually in mid-May at Pimlico Race Course in Baltimore, Maryland. It is the eighth-oldest graded stakes race in the United States and the oldest stakes race in Maryland and all of the Mid-Atlantic states. The race is open to horses age three and up and is run one and one-eighth miles on the turf. Currently a Grade III stakes race with a purse of $500,000, at one time the Dixie was a very important race that drew the top horses from across North America.

== History ==
First run as the "Dinner Party Stakes" when Pimlico Race Course opened in 1870, it was named for the 1868 dinner party in Saratoga Springs, New York where Maryland Governor Oden Bowie and others met and wagered, resulting in the building of the Pimlico race course for thoroughbred race horses.

The inaugural event was won by Preakness, for whom the Preakness Stakes was named, with Ecliptic finishing second. In 1871, it was called the Reunion Stakes and was won in a walkover by Harry Bassett. Suspended in 1888, in 1924, the race was revived by William P. Riggs, Maryland Jockey Club secretary.

== Race name changes ==
- Dinner Party Stakes 1870, 2020–present
- Reunion Stakes (1871)
- Dixie Stakes 1872–1913, 1995,1997–2019
- Dixie Handicap (1914–1994, 1996)

== Modern era ==
Champions of many eras are among the Dixie's winners. Ten winners or runners-up have won the Eclipse Award or Champion, the latest being Paradise Creek in 1994. Other Dixie Stakes Champions include Sky Classic (1992), Bowl Game (1978), Fort Marcy (1970), Turbo Jet II (1964), Assault (1947), Armed (1946), Whirlaway (1942), Sarazen (1925), Duke of Magenta (1878), and Tom Ochiltree (1875).

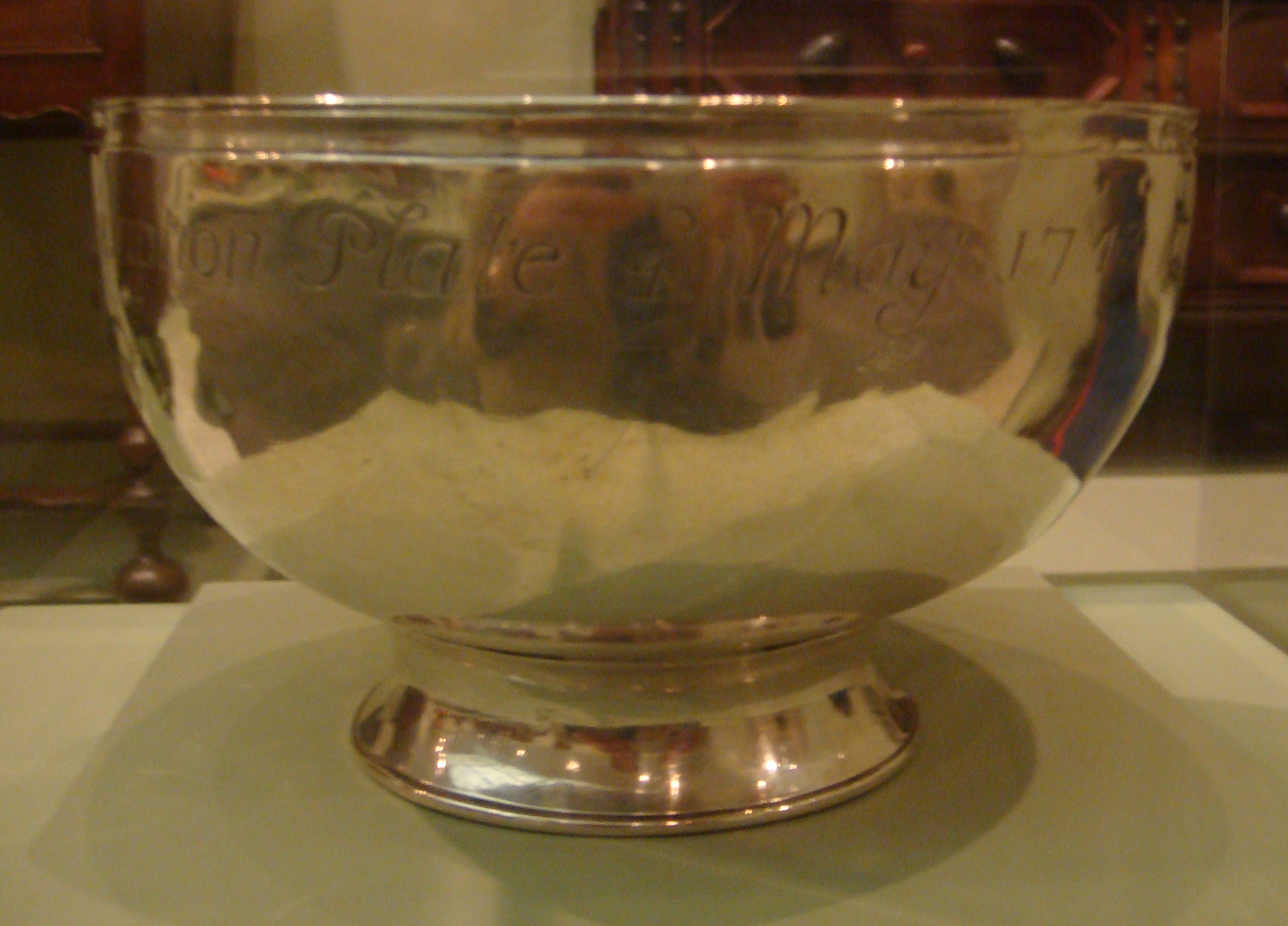
The Annapolis Subscription Plate, awarded to the racehorse Dungannon in 1743. Collection of the Baltimore Museum of Art.

The winner of the Dixie Stakes is presented with one of the most revered trophies in American thoroughbred horseracing, a replica of the oldest trophy in North America, the Annapolis Subscription Plate. That replica, "The Dungannon Bowl", is a perpetual trophy given annually to the winner of the Dixie Stakes, the oldest stakes race run in Maryland and the Mid-Atlantic states.

Run for many years as the Dixie Handicap, in 1965 it was raced in two divisions at a mile and a half. Or et Argent won the first division in a course record time of 2:30.20. A few minutes later, Flag won the second division, beating Or et Argent's record with a clocking of 2:29.00.

The 2018 edition of the race was run on dirt due to a heavy front of rain over Pimlico, and was downgraded to a Gr.III for the running. Fire Away, a half-brother to stallion Mr. Speaker, won the race.

The event was downgraded in 2023 to Grade III.

The 2024 edition of the Dinner Party Stakes was run on a very soggy track and resulted in a very slow winning time.

== Records ==
Most wins:

- 2 – Sarazen (1925, 1926)
- 2 – Fort Washington (2025, 2026)

Speed record:

- 1 1/16 mile : 1:40.57 – Ironicus (2015)
- 1 1/8 mile : 1:46.14 - Never Explain (2023)
- 1 1/2 miles : 2:27.80 – Nassipour (1985)

Most wins by an owner:

- 5 – Calumet Farm (1937, 1942, 1944, 1946, 2013)

Most wins by a jockey:

- 5 – Ramon Domínguez (2003, 2004, 2006, 2007, 2010)

Most wins by a trainer:

- 7 - Claude R. McGaughey III (1993, 2009, 2015, 2018, 2023, 2025, 2026)

== Winners of the Dinner Party Stakes since 1870 ==
Year	Winner	Age	Jockey	Trainer	Owner	Distance (Miles)	Time	Purse	Gr.
2026	Fort Washington	7	Junior Alvarado	Shug McGaughey	Magic Cap Stables	1 1/8	1:47.15	$247,500	III
2025	Fort Washington	6	Junior Alvarado	Shug McGaughey	Magic Cap Stables	1 1/8	1:54.20	$250,000	III
2024	Balnikhov	5	Lanfranco Dettori	Philip D'Amato	Little Red Feather/Madaket Stables/Old Bones Racing Stables	1 1/8	1:58.90	$300,000	III
2023	Never Explain	5	Flavien Prat	Shug McGaughey	Courtlandt Farms (Donald & Donna Adam)	1 1/8	1:46.14	$120,000	III
2022	Set Piece	6	Florent Geroux	Brad H. Cox	Juddmonte	1 1/16	1:41.64	$250,000	II
2021	Somelikeithotbrown	5	José L. Ortiz	Michael J. Maker	Skychai Racing LLC	1 1/16	1:40.09	$250,000	II
2020	Factor This	5	Florent Geroux	Brad H. Cox	Gaining Ground Racing LLC	1 1/16	1:46.17	$250,000	II
2019	Catholic Boy	4	Javier Castellano	Johnathan Thomas	Robert V. LaPenta, et al.	1 1/16	1:41.09	$250,000	II
2018	Fire Away	6	Manuel Franco	Shug McGaughey	Phipps Stable	1 1/16	1:43.92	$250,000	III
2017	World Approval	5	Julien Leparoux	Mark Casse	Live Oak Plantation	1 1/16	1:43.15	$250,000	II
2016	Takeover Target	4	Joel Rosario	Chad C. Brown	Klaravich Stables & William Lawrence	1 1/16	1:44.76	$250,000	II
2015	Ironicus	4	Javier Castellano	Shug McGaughey	Stuart S. Janney III	1 1/16	1:40.53	$300,000	II
2014	Utley	6	Edgar Prado	Jonathan E. Sheppard	Augustin Stable	1 1/16	1:43.88	$400,000	II
2013	Skyring	4	Gary Stevens	D. Wayne Lukas	Calumet Farm	1 1/8	1:47.87	$400,000	II
2012	Hudson Steele	5	Javier Castellano	Todd A. Pletcher	Roger Weiss	1 1/8	1:47.29	$300,000	II
2011	Paddy O'Prado	4	Kent Desormeaux	Dale Romans	Donegal Racing	1 1/8	1:53.56	$200,000	II
2010	Strike a Deal	6	Ramon Domínguez	Alan E. Goldberg	Richard Santulli	1 1/8	1:47.81	$200,000	II
2009	Parading	6	Kent Desormeaux	Shug McGaughey	Ogden Phipps	1 1/8	1:48.28	$200,000	II
2008	Pays to Dream	4	Javier Castellano	David G. Donk	December Hill Farm	1 1/8	1:54.74	$250,000	II
2007	Remarkable News	5	Ramon Domínguez	Angel Penna Jr.	Holly Rincon	1 1/8	1:46.36	$250,000	II
2006	Better Talk Now	7	Ramon Domínguez	H. Graham Motion	Bushwood Racing	1 1/8	1:48.48	$250,000	II
2005	Cool Conductor	4	Cornelio Velásquez	Ralph Nicks	David E. Garner	1 1/8	1:52.79	$200,000	II
2004	Mr O'Brien	5	Ramon Domínguez	Robin L. Graham	Skeedattle II	1 1/8	1:46.34	$200,000	II
2003	Dr. Brendler	5	Ramon Domínguez	H. Graham Motion	Francis O'Toole	1 1/8	1:57.78	$200,000	II
2002	Strut The Stage	4	Robby Albarado	Mark Frostad	Sam-Son Farm	1 1/8	1:51.70	$200,000	II
2001	Hap	5	Jerry Bailey	William I. Mott	Allen E. Paulson Trust	1 1/8	1:48.56	$200,000	II
2000	Quiet Resolve	5	Robby Albarado	Mark Frostad	Sam-Son Farm	1 1/8	1:50.42	$200,000	II
1999	Middlesex Drive	4	Pat Day	Philip M. Hauswald	C. Steven Duncker	1 1/8	1:48.64	$200,000	II
1998	Yagli	5	Jerry Bailey	William I. Mott	Allen E. Paulson Trust	1 1/8	1:51.01	$200,000	II
1997	Ops Smile	5	Edgar Prado	J. William Boniface	Jacq. & Roger Schipke	1 1/8	1:48.20	$200,000	II
1996	Gold and Steel	4	Alex Solis	Jean C. Rouget	Gary A. Tanaka	1 1/8	1:52.80	$200,000	II
1995	The Vid	5	Jerry Bailey	Marty Wolfson	Joseph J. Sullivan	1 1/8	1:52.25	$200,000	II
1994	Paradise Creek	5	Pat Day	William I. Mott	Masayuki Nishiyama	1 1/8	1:48.51	$150,000	II
1993	Lure	4	Mike E. Smith	Shug McGaughey	Claiborne Farm	1 1/8	1:47.60	$150,000	II
1992	Sky Classic	5	Pat Day	James E. Day	Sam-Son Farm	1 1/8	1:47.83	$150,000	II
1991	Double Booked	6	Pat Day	Linda L. Rice	Robert Gorham	1 1/8	1:47.04	$150,000	III
1990	Two Moccasins	4	Randy Romero	Laz Barrera	James E. Cottrell	1 1/2	2:35.80	$150,000	III
1989	Coeur de Leon	5	Jean Cruguet	W. Burling Cocks	Evergreen Farms	1 1/2	2:38.40	$150,000	II
1988	Kadial	5	Gary Stevens	Melvin F. Stute	Jack Liebau	1 5/8	2:45.00	$150,000	II
1987	Akabir	6	Craig Perret	Thomas Skiffington	Minnesota Sunrise Stable	1 1/2	2:28.60	$125,000	II
1986	Uptown Swell	4	Walter Guerra	Richard J. Lundy	Virginia Kraft Payson	1 1/2	2:28.40	$150,000	II
1985	Nassipour	5	Vincent Bracciale	Stephen A. DiMauro	Dogwood Stable	1 1/2	2:27.80	$125,000	II
1984	Persian Tiara	4	Roger L. Shelton	Adrian Maxwell	Mrs. T. P. Donahue	1 1/2	2:41.00	$150,000	II
1983	Khatango	4	Vincent Bracciale	David A. Whiteley	Pen-Y-Bryn Farm	1 1/2	2:28.60	$125,000	II
1982	Robsphere	5	John Velazquez	Richard Root	Harry T. Mangurian Jr.	1 1/2	2:30.20	$125,000	II
1981	El Barril	5	Jacinto Vásquez	Smiley Adams	Walnut Hill Farms	1 1/2	2:29.80	$125,000	II
1980	Marquee Universal	4	Hector Pilar	David A. Whiteley	Gerald Freed	1 1/2	2:29.60	$125,000	II
1979	The Very One	4	Charlie Cooke	Stephen A. DiMauro	Helen Polinger	1 1/2	2:28.60	$125,000	II
1978	Bowl Game	4	Jorge Velásquez	John M. Gaver Jr.	Greentree Stable	1 1/2	2:33.40	$65,000	II
1977	Improviser	5	Miguel A. Rivera	Jack Weipert	Elmendorf Farm	1 1/2	2:28.60	$95,000	II
1976	Barcas	5	Vincent Bracciale	Leonard Imperio	Nelson Bunker Hunt	1 1/2	2:29.60	$65,000	II
1975	Bemo	5	Chris McCarron	John W. Murphy	Hickory Tree Stable	1 1/2	2:33.40	$65,000	II
1974	London Company	4	Ángel Cordero Jr.	LeRoy Jolley	Chance Hill Farm	1 1/2	2:28.80	$65,000	II
1973	Laplander	6	Vincent Bracciale	Pierce Laplander	Buckingham Farm	1 1/2	2:30.40	$65,000	II
1972	Onondaga	6	Jack Kurtz	Frank Y. Whiteley Jr.	Oakmead Farm	1 1/2	2:30.00	$65,000	
1971	Chompion **	6	Michael Hole	Ivor G. Balding	C. V. Whitney	1 1/2	2:34.20	$63,000	
1970	Fort Marcy	6	Jorge Velásquez	J. Elliott Burch	Rokeby Stables	1 1/2	2:27.20	$64,000	
1969	Czar Alexander	4	Bill Hartack	Angel Penna Sr.	Gustave Ring	1 1/2	2:30.80	$64,000	
1968	High Hat	4	Ray Broussard	John O. Meaux	Mrs. Wallace Gilroy	1 1/2	2:29.80	$65,000	
1967	War Censor	4	Earlie Fires	S. Bryant Ott	Fourth Estate Stable	1 1/2	2:36.60	$67,500	
1966	Knightly Manner	5	Tommy Lee	Kenneth A. Field	Barbara Guggenheim Obre	1 1/2	2:30.80	$67,500	
1965 #	Or et Argent	4	Walter Blum	Wayne Stucki	Colin Campbell	1 1/2	2:30.20	$35,000	
1965 #	Flag	5	Tommy Lee	Hirsch Jacobs	Jack Dreyfus	1 1/2	2:29.00	$35,000	
1964	Will I Rule	4	Ron Turcotte	Joseph S. Nash	Fitz Eugene Dixon Jr.	1 1/2	2:40.00	$70,000	
1963	Cedar Key	3	Tommy Lee	Don McCoy	Jerry Basta	1 1/2	2:32.20	$70,000	
1962	Wise Ship	5	Heliodoro Gustines	Jacob Byer	Milton Ritzenberg	1 1/2	2:42.40	$72,000	
1961	Hunter's Rock	3	Frank Lovato	Kenneth A. Field	Barbara Guggenheim Obre	1 1/2	2:36.20	$30,000	
1960	Shield Bearer	5	Nick Shuk	Jimmy Pitt	Stephen C. Clark Jr.	1 1/2	2:32.40	$30,000	
1959	One-Eyed King	5	Manuel Ycaza	Tommy Kelly	Cain Hoy Stable	1 3/8	2:15.40	$30,000	
1958	Pop Corn	4	John Ruane	John M. Gaver Sr.	Greentree Stable	1 3/8	2:21.60	$32,750	
1957	Akbar Khan	5	Eldon Nelson	Thomas M. Waller	Cockfield Stable	1 3/8	2:16.20	$32,750	
1956	Chevation	5	Chris Rogers	Richard E. Handlen	Foxcatcher Farms	1 3/8	2:17.40	$35,000	
1955	St. Vincent	4	Basil James	Vance Longden	Gardiner/Alberta Ranches	1 3/8	2:15.40	$34,000	
1954	Straight Face	4	Bennie Green	George Poole	Greentree Stable	1 1/8	1:51.00	$33,000	
1953	Royal Vale	5	Jack Westrope	James E. Ryan	Esther du Pont Weir	1 1/8	1:51.80	$32,000	
1952	Alerted	4	Rocco Sisto	Jimmy Penrod	Hampton Stable	1 3/16	1:58.00	$35,000	
1951	County Delight	4	Jimmy Nichols	James E. Ryan	Rokeby Stables	1 3/16	1:58.80	$32,000	
1950	Loser Weeper	5	Nick Combest	Bill Winfrey	Alfred Gwynne Vanderbilt Jr.	1 3/16	1:56.20	$32,000	
1949	Chains	4	Job Dean Jessop	Preston M. Burch	Brookmeade Stable	1 3/16	1:56.60	$35,000	
1948	Fervent	4	N. Leroy Pierson	Horace A. Jones	Calumet Farm	1 3/16	2:01.60	$40,000	
1947	Assault	4	Eddie Arcaro	Max Hirsch	King Ranch	1 3/16	1:57.40	$41,500	
1946	Armed	5	Douglas Dodson	Ben A. Jones	Calumet Farm	1 3/16	1:58.20	$45,000	
1945	Rounders	6	Fred Remerscheid	Frank Catrone	Valdina Farm	1 3/16	1:56.40	$42,000	
1944	Sun Again	5	Fred A. Smith	Ben A. Jones	Calumet Farm	1 3/16	1:58.20	$42,000	
1943	Riverland	5	Steve Brooks	Moody Jolley	Louisiana Farm	1 3/16	1:56.40	$30,000	
1942	Whirlaway	4	Eddie Arcaro	Ben A. Jones	Calumet Farm	1 3/16	1:57.00	$32,000	
1941	Haltal	4	Conn McCreary	Steve Judge	Royce G. Martin	1 3/16	1:58.40	$33,000	
1940	Honey Cloud	6	Henry Mora	Whitey Abel	Mrs. Albert J. Abel	1 3/16	1:58.60	$30,000	
1939	Sir Damion	5	Don Meade	George M. Odom	Marshall Field III	1 3/16	1:58.60	$36,000	
1938	Pompoon	4	George Woolf	Johnny Loftus	Jerome H. Louchheim	1 3/16	1:56.80	$34,000	
1937	Calumet Dick	5	Joe Wagner	Ben A. Jones	Calumet Farm	1 3/16	1:58.40	$15,000	
1936	Dark Hope	7	Robert Jones	Louis Feustel	J. W. Y. Martin	1 3/16	1:57.00	$32,000	
1935	Only One	4	Robert Merritt		Mrs. W. Deering Howe	1 3/16	2:01.80	$7,500	
1934	Equipoise	6	Raymond Workman	Thomas J. Healey	Cornelius V. Whitney	1 3/16	2:01.80	$7,000	
1933	Stepenfetchit	4	Earl Steffen	James W. Healy	Liz Whitney	1 3/16	2:01.80	$9,000	
1932	Gallant Knight	5	Herman Schutte	Kay Spence	Audley Farm Stable	1 3/16	1:58.00	$24,000	
1931	Paul Bunyan	5	E. Gianelloni	B. R. Johnson	L. M. Severson	1 3/16	2:01.20	$25,000	
1930	Sandy Ford	4	Frank Catrone	William Shea	Myrtle Shea	1 3/16	1:59.20	$42,000	
1929	Diavolo	4	Johnny Maiben	Jim Fitzsimmons	Wheatley Stable	1 3/16	2:00.00	$45,000	
1928	Mike Hall	4	Harry Richards	Walter W. Taylor	Hal Price Headley	1 3/16	1:59.00	$40,000	
1927	Mars	4	Frank Coltiletti	Scott P. Harlan	Walter M. Jeffords	1 3/16	1:59.40	$42,000	
1926	Sarazen	5	Fred Weiner	Max Hirsch	Virginia Fair Vanderbilt	1 3/16	2:00.80	$40,000	
1925	Sarazen	4	Earl Sande	Max Hirsch	Virginia Fair Vanderbilt	1 3/16	2:02.00	$42,000	
1924	Chacolet	6	Mack Garner	Will Buford	Hal Price Headley	1 3/16	1:59.20	$40,000	
1919	– 1923	Race not held							
1918	Cudgel	4	Earl Sande	H. Guy Bedwell	J. K. L. Ross	1 3/16	1:59.20	$40,000	
1917	Ticket	4	Andy Schuttinger		Andrew Miller	1 3/16	1:59.20	$40,000	
1916	Short Grass	8	Frank Keogh		Emil Herz	1 3/16	1:59.20	$40,000	
1915	The Finn	3	James H. Butwell	Edward W. Heffner	Harry C. Hallenbeck	1 3/16	1:59.20	$40,000	
1905	– 1914	Race not held							
1904	The Southerner	3	Matthew Corbett			1 3/4	3:06.60	$5,500	
1903	Colonsay	3	William Daly			1 3/4	3:41.40	$3,000	
1902	Adelaide Prince	3	W. Powers			1 3/4	3:06.60	$2,500	
1889	– 1901	Race not held							
1888	Taragon	3	William Hayward	John Huggins	Alexander Cassatt	2 miles	3:37.00	$7,000	
1887	Hanover	3	Jim McLaughlin	Frank McCabe	Dwyer Brothers Stable	2 miles	3:51.60	$7,500	
1886	The Bard	3	William Hayward Sr.	John Huggins	Alexander Cassatt	2 miles	3:33.00	$6,000	
1885	East Lynne	3	William Donohue			2 miles	3:49.60	$6,500	
1884	Loftin	3	Johnny Stoval		R. A. Johnson & Co.	2 miles	3:37.60	$6,500	
1883	George Kinney	3	Jim McLaughlin	James G. Rowe Sr.	Dwyer Brothers Stable	2 miles	3:56.00	$6,500	
1882	Monarch	3	Charles Shauer			2 miles	3:44.00	$6,500	
1881	Crickmore	3	Lloyd Hughes	Bill Bird	Oden Bowie	2 miles	3:37.00	$6,500	
1880	Grenada	3	Lloyd Hughes	Wyndham Walden	George L. Lorillard	2 miles	3:38.00	$7,500	
1879	Monitor	3	Lloyd Hughes	Wyndham Walden	George L. Lorillard	2 miles	3:34.60	$8,000	
1878	Duke of Magenta	3	Lloyd Hughes	Wyndham Walden	George L. Lorillard	2 miles	3:41.00	$7,500	
1877	King Faro	3	William Walker		J. H. McIntyre/G. Rice	2 miles	3:55.00	$7,500	
1876	Vigil	3	John Spellman	Col. David McDaniel	Col. David McDaniel	2 miles	3:41.50	$7,500	
1875	Tom Ochiltree	3	George Evans	Wyndham Walden	John F. Chamberlain	2 miles	3:42.50	$7,500	
1874	Vandalite	3	M. H. Houston		A. B. Lewis & Co.	2 miles	3:35.50	$20,000	
1873	Tom Bowling	3	Robert Swim	David McDaniel	David McDaniel	2 miles	3:58.00	$7,000	
1872	Hubbard	3	Frank McCabe		David McDaniel	2 miles	3:36.50	$20,000	
1871	Harry Bassett	4	James G. Rowe Sr.	David McDaniel	David McDaniel	2 miles	3:55.00	$11,000	
1870	Preakness	3	William Hayward Sr.	Charles Littlefield Sr.	Milton H. Sanford	2 miles	3:47.50	$11,000	

A # designates that the race was run in two divisions in 1965.
** In 1971 Fort Marcy finished first but was disqualified and placed fourth. A @ indicates that this race was run at Laurel Park Racecourse from 1915 to 1919 as the Dixie Handicap.

== See also ==
- Dinner Party Stakes top three finishers
- Preakness Stakes
- Black-Eyed Susan Stakes
- Pimlico Race Course
- List of graded stakes at Pimlico Race Course

=== Laurel Parks's Dixie Handicap ===
From 1915 through 1918, Laurel Park Racecourse hosted a Dixie Handicap. The winners were:

- 1918 – Cudgel
- 1917 – Ticket
- 1916 – Short Grass
- 1915 – The Finn
