= Strike a Deal =

American-bred Thoroughbred racehorse

Strike A Deal
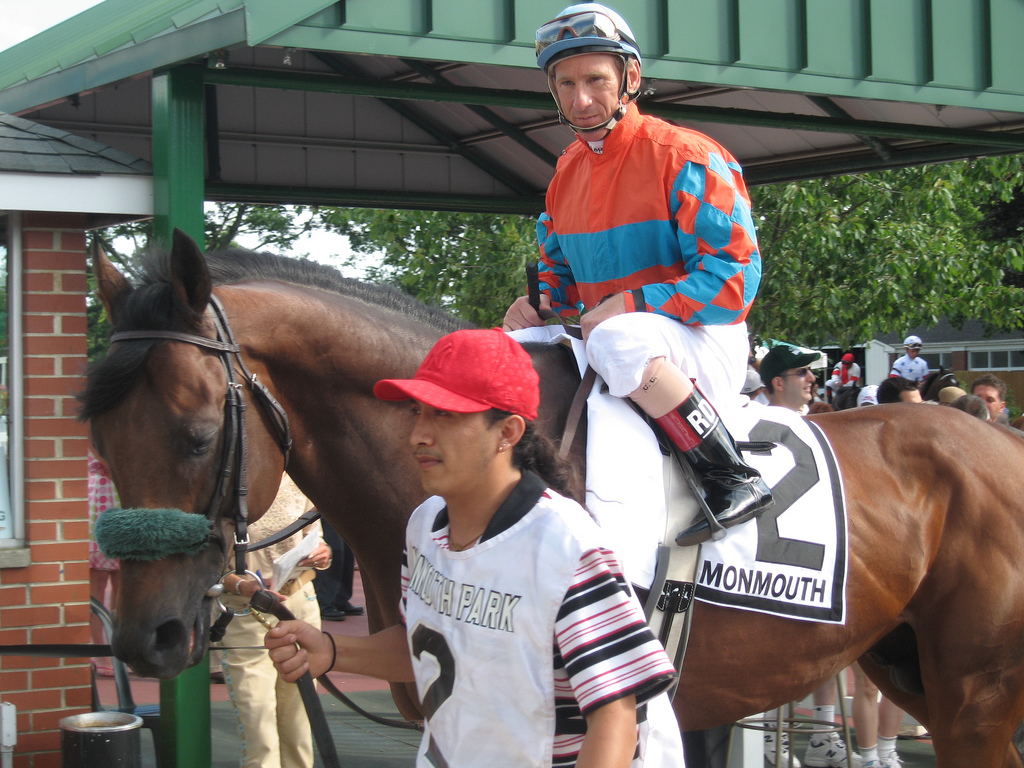
- 2009 United Nations Stakes.
- Sire: Smart Strike
- Grandsire: Mr. Prospector
- Dam: Shag
- Damsire: Dixieland Band
- Sex: Gelding
- Foaled: 2004
- Country: United States
- Colour: Chestnut (horse color)
- Breeder: Bee Zee
- Owner: Jayeff B Stables
- Trainer: Alan E. Goldberg
- Record: 26: 5 - 7 - 1
- Earnings: $1,071,675

Major wins
- Dixie Stakes (2010); Laurel Futurity Stakes (2006); Red Smith Handicap (2008); Straight Deal Stakes (2007)
- Last updated on May 31, 2011

Strike A Deal (foaled in January 2004) was a Thoroughbred racehorse foaled in Kentucky who was a millionaire turf specialist that won or placed in twelve stakes races at eight tracks in six different states or provinces over his five-year racing career. The son of Smart Strike is probably best remembered for winning the Grade II 1 1/8 miles Dixie Stakes at Pimlico Race Course on the Preakness Stakes undercard.

== Early career ==
Strike a Deal was purchased in the Keeneland September yearling sale for $350,000. After breaking his maiden in the summer of 2006, he raced in the Pilgrim Stakes in late September at Belmont Park in New York and placed second at 1 1/8 miles on the turf. Then his connections sent him south to Maryland for the Laurel Futurity at Laurel Park Racecourse, where he won the $150,000 race at 1 1/16 miles on the turf.

== Three-year-old season ==
Strike a Deal won the Straight Deal Stakes at Belmont Park at one mile on the turf. In the summer of 2007, he ran second in both the grade three Colonial Turf Cup at 1 3/16 miles in mid-June and the Virginia Derby at 1 1/4 miles in mid-July, both run at Colonial Downs in New Kent County, Virginia, on the turf course. Strike a Deal then ran third in the grade three Kent Breeders' Cup Stakes at Delaware Park Racetrack in late September at 1 1/8 miles on the turf.

== Four-year-old season ==
In May, he placed second in the Volponi Stakes at Belmont Park, a listed stakes race at 1 1/8 miles on the turf. In July 2008, he ran second in the grade one United Nations Handicap in New Jersey at Monmouth Park Racetrack at 1 3/8 miles on the turf. In August, Strike a Deal ran in the Nijinsky Stakes and placed second in the 1 1/4 miles race on the turf at Woodbine Racetrack. In late October 2008, he continued his streak of second-place finishes with his fourth straight in the Knickerbocker Handicap, a grade two 1 1/8 miles turf race held at Belmont Park. Late in the year, he won the graded Red Smith Handicap in early November at Aqueduct Racetrack in New York City at 1 3/8 miles on the turf.

== Six-year-old season ==
After not racing as a five-year-old, Strike a Deal was entered in the Grade II $200,000 Dixie Stakes featuring a field of 12 older horses going 1 1/8 miles on the turf at Pimlico Race Course. He started his six-year-old campaign on May 15, 2010, off a long layoff and broke from gate eight at odds of 14–1. Although the favorites, Grassy and Just As Well, broke quickly, Strike a Deal rushed to the front and took the lead going into the clubhouse turn. Entering the top of the lane, he accelerated away from the field and held off a rallying Just As Well to win by 3/4 length in 1:47.8. It was another 1/2 length back to Rahystrada in third.
