= Donn Handicap top three finishers =

Horse race result

This is a listing of the horses that finished in either first, second, or third place and the number of starters in the discontinued Donn Handicap, an American Grade 1 race for three-year-olds at 1-1/8 miles on the dirt at Gulfstream Park in Hallandale, Florida. (List 1973–present)

Year	Winner	Second	Third	Starters
2016	Mshawish	Valid	Mexikoma	8
2015	Constitution	Lea	Elanaawi	9
2014	Lea	Will Take Charge	Viramundo	11
2013	Graydar	Bourbon Courage	Take Charge Indy	10
2012	Hymn Book	Mission Impazible	Redeemed	11
2011	Giant Oak	Morning Line	Rule	9
2010	Quality Road	Delightful Kiss	Dry Martini	9
2009	Albertus Maximus	Finallymadeit	Einstein	10
2008	Spring At Last	A. P. Arrow	Kiss the Kid	8
2007	Invasor	Hesanoldsalt	A. P. Arrow	8
2006	Brass Hat	Pies Prospect	Andromedia's Hero	9
2005	Saint Liam	Roses in May	Eddington	6
2004	Medaglia d'Oro	Seattle Fitz	Funny Cide	8
2003	Harlan's Holiday	Hero's Tribute	Puzzlement	11
2002	Mongoose	Kiss a Native	Rize	14
2001	Captain Steve	Albert the Great	Gander	7
2000	Stephen Got Even	Golden Missile	Behrens	10
1999	Puerto Madero	Behrens	Silver Charm	12
1998	Skip Away	Unruled	Sir Bear	10
1997	Formal Gold	Skip Away	Mecke	10
1996	Cigar	Wekiva Springs	Heavenly Prize	8
1995	Cigar	Primitive Hall	Bonus Money	9
1994	Pistols and Roses	Eequalsmcspuared	Wallenda	11
1993	Pistols and Roses	Irish Swap	Missionary Ridge	9
1992	Sea Cadet	Out of Place	Sunny Sunrise	8
1991	Jolie's Halo	Sports View	Secret Hello	12
1990	Primal	Ole Atocha	Western Playboy	8
1989	Cryptoclearance	Slew City Slew	Primal	12
1988	Jade Hunter	Cryptoclearance	Personal Flag	8
1987	Little Bold John	Skip Trial	Wise Times	7
1986	Creme Fraiche	Skip Trial	Minneapple	13
1985	Mo Exception	Dr. Carter	Key to the Moon	10
1984	Play Fellow	Courteous Majesty	Jack Slade	9
1983	Deputy Minister	Key Count	Rivalero	16
1982	Joanie's Chief	Double Sonic	Lord Darnley	12
1981	Hurry Up Blue	Tunerup	Joanie's Chief	5
1980	Lot o' Gold	Addison	Going Investor	9
1979	Jumping Hill	Bob's Dusty	Silent Cal	14
1978	Man's Man	Intercontinent	Adriatico	11
1977	Legion	Logical	Yamianin	7
1976	Foolish Pleasure	Packer Captain	Home Jerome	10
1975	Proud and Bold	Holding Pattern	Arbees Boy	6
1974	Forego	True Knight	Proud and Bold	5
1973	Triumphant	Second Bar	Gentle Smoke	7
