= Gulfstream Park Handicap top three finishers and starters =

This is a listing of the horses that finished in either first, second, or third place and the number of starters in the Gulfstream Park Handicap, an American Grade 2 race for horses four years old and older at 1 mile on the dirt, held at Gulfstream Park in Hallandale Beach, Florida. (List 1973–present)

Year	Winner	Second	Third	Starters
2013	Discreet Dancer	Swagger Jack	Fort Loudon	6
2012	Mucho Macho Man	Tackleberry	Jackson Bend	5
2010	Tackleberry	Soaring Empire	Tizway	8
2009	Smooth Air	Finallymadeit	Formidable	6
2008	Sir Whimsey	Fairbanks	Kiss the Kid	5
2007	Corinthian	Hesanoldsalt	A. P. Arrow	6
2006	Harlington	Contante	It's No Joke	8
2005	Eddington	Pies Prospect	Zakocity	8
2004	Jackpot	Newfoundland	The Lady's Groom	6
2003	Hero's Tribute	Aeneas	Puzzlement	8
2002	Hal's Hope	Mongoose	Sir Bear	5
2001	Sir Bear	Pleasant Breeze	Broken Vow	9
2000	Behrens	Adonis	With Antucipation	6
1999	Behrens	Archers Bay	Sir Bear	8
1998	Skip Away	Unruled	Behrens	6
1997	Mt. Sassafras	Skip Away	Tejano Run	6
1996	Wekiva Springs	Star Standard	Powerful Punch	8
1995	Cigar	Pride of Burkaan	Mahogany Hall	11
1994	Scuffleburg	Migrating Moon	Wallenda	10
1993	Devil His Due	Offbeat	Pistols and Roses	9
1992	Sea Cadet	Strike the Gold	Sunny Sunrise	6
1991	Jolie's Halo	Primal	Chief Honcho	8
1990	Mi Selecto	Tour d'Or	Lay Down	8
1989	Slew City Slew	Bold Midway	Cryptoclearance	7
1988	Jade Hunter	Cryptoclearance	Creme Fraiche	6
1987	Skip Trial	Creme Fraiche	Snow Chief	4
1986	Skip Trial	Proud Truth	Important Business	5
1985	Dr. Carter	Key to the Moon	Pine Circle	8
1984	Mat-Boy	Lord Darley	Courteous Majesty	7
1983	Christmas Past	Crafty Prospector	Rivalero	12
1982	Lord Darnley	Joanie's Chief	Double Sonic	9
1981	Hurry Up Blue	Yosi Boy	Imperial Dilemma	9
1980	Private Account	Lot o' Gold	Silent Cal	7
1979	Sensitive Prince	Jumping Hill	Silent Cal	7
1978	Bowl Game	True Statement	Silver Series	11
1977	Strike Me Lucky	Legion	Yamanin	12
1976	Hail the Pirates	Legion	Packer Captain	7
1975	Gold and Myrrh	Proud and Bold	Buffalo Lark	9
1974	Forego	True Knight	Golden Don	6
1973	West Coast Scout	Super Sail	Freetex	10

== See also ==
- Gulfstream Park Handicap
- Gulfstream Park
