= 2005 Breeders' Cup Classic =

Thoroughbred horse race

22nd Breeders' Cup Classic
- Breeders' Cup Classic
- Location: Belmont Park
- Date: October 29, 2005
- Winning horse: Saint Liam
- Winning time: 2:01.29
- Jockey: Jerry Bailey
- Trainer: Rick Dutrow
- Owner: William and Suzanne Warren
- Conditions: Fast
- Surface: Dirt
- Attendance: 54,289

The 2005 Breeders' Cup Classic was the 22nd running of the Breeders' Cup Classic, part of the 2005 Breeders' Cup World Thoroughbred Championships program. It was run on October 29, 2005 at Belmont Park in Elmont, New York with a purse of $4,000,000. It was won by Saint Liam, who was subsequently named American Horse of the Year.

The Classic is run on dirt at a distance of 1 1/4 miles (approximately 2000 m). It is run under weight-for-age conditions, with entrants carrying the following weights:

- Northern Hemisphere three-year-olds: 122 lb
- Southern Hemisphere three-year-olds: 117 lb
- Four-year-olds and up: 126 lb
- Any fillies or mares receive a 3 lb allowance

== Contenders ==
The Classic drew a full field although some of the most highly regarded horses of 2005 (Ghostzapper, Roses in May and Afleet Alex) were retired early due to injury. The leading contenders for the Classic were:

- Saint Liam, winner of the Donn Handicap, Stephen Foster and Woodward Stakes. Had never won at 10 furlongs
- Rock Hard Ten, winner of the Santa Anita Handicap and Goodwood Handicap
- Borrego, winner of the Pacific Classic and Jockey Club Gold Cup

In the absence of Afleet Alex and Kentucky Derby winner Giacomo, Flower Alley (Travers Stakes) was the most highly regarded three-year-old. The New Zealand-bred horse Starcraft, who won the 2004 Australian Derby and 2005 Queen Elizabeth II Stakes, was supplemented to the Classic at a cost of $800,000 as he had not been nominated as a foal.

Due to the dimensions of Belmont Park, the starting gate for the Classic was located on the clubhouse turn. This placed horses who drew outside post positions (especially Saint Liam and Starcraft) at a disadvantage as they would have to run somewhat farther. Rock Hard Ten drew post position one, which was also disadvantageous as he risked getting caught in traffic along the rail.

== Race Description ==
Rock Hard Ten was scratched shortly before the race due to a hoof injury.

After breaking poorly, Saint Liam settled into fifth place behind a moderate early pace set by Sun King and Suave. Flower Alley stalked the early leaders then took command rounding the turn. Racing four wide, Saint Liam moved alongside Flower Alley at the top of the stretch and gradually pulled away, winning by a length. Perfect Drift closed late to finish third.

Saint Liam was the first major winner for trainer Rick Dutrow, who was highly emotional after the race. "I can't explain the feeling. He gives me a feeling I've never had before. I owe him everything. He is my boy. I see him every night before I go to bed. And I'm going to miss him so much. Words just can't describe this horse."

It was jockey Jerry Bailey's fifteenth win at the Breeders' Cup, then a record. Bailey felt that Saint Liam had cemented Horse of the Year honors with the win, pointing out how much ground Saint Liam had lost at the start due to his outside post position and a poor break that shifted his course even further outside. "He took the worse of it today, and still was very authoritative in winning."

== Results ==
Finish	Program Number	Horse	Trainer	Jockey	Final Odds	Margin	Winnings
1	13	Saint Liam	Rick Dutrow	Jerry Bailey	2.40	1 length	$2,433,600
2	9	Flower Alley	Todd Pletcher	John Velazquez	10.00	1 length	$936,000
3	5	Perfect Drift	Murray Johnson	Mark Guidry	4.20	1/2 lengths	$514,800
4	7	Super Frolic	Vladimir Cerin	Eibar Coa	69.25	2 3/4 lengths	$266,760
5	8	Suave	Paul McGee	Edgar Prado	16.40	3 lengths	$140,400
6	3	Choctaw Nation	Jeff Mullins	Victor Espinoza	13.00	6 1/4 lengths	
7	14	Starcraft (NZ)	Luca Cumani	Patrick Valenzuela	8.50	7 1/2 lengths	
8	6	Sir Shackleton	Nick Zito	Javier Castellano	36.50	8 lengths	
9	2	Sun King	Nick Zito	Rafael Bejarano	30.50	8 1/4 lengths	
10	11	Borrego	C Greely	Garrett Gomez	2.60	10 1/4 lengths	
11	4	Oratorio (IRE)	Aidan O'Brien	Kieren Fallon	9.40	1/2 lengths	
12	10	Jack Sullivan	Gerard Butler	Lanfranco Dettori	51.25	18 lengths	
13	12	A Bit O'Gold	Catherine Day Phillips	Jono Jones	51.75	18 1/4 lengths	

Times: 1/4 – 0:23.98; 1/2 – 0:47.68; 3/4 – 1:12.23; mile – 1:36.87; final – 2:01.49.
Fractional Splits: (:23.98) (:23.70) (:24.55) (:24.64) (:24.62)

Source: Equibase Chart

== Payout ==
Payout Schedule:

Program Number	Horse	Win	Place	Show
13	Saint Liam	6.80	5.10	4.20
9	Flower Alley		8.70	7.10
5	Perfect Drift			7.80

- $2 Exacta (13-9) Paid $62.00
- $2 Trifecta (13-9-5) Paid $501.00
- $2 Superfecta (13-9-5-7) Paid $12,636.00
