= Jumping Hill =

American Thoroughbred racehorse

- Sire: Hillary
- Grandsire: Khaled
- Dam: Frequently
- Damsire: Decidedly
- Sex: Gelding
- Foaled: 1972
- Country: United States
- Color: Bay
- Breeder: George A. Pope Jr.
- Owner: El Peco Ranch (George A. Pope Jr.)
- Trainer: Noel Murless; John H. Adams; Horatio Luro
- Record: 36: 12-8-4
- Earnings: US$459,442

Major wins
- England: Royal Hunt Cup (1976); United States: San Francisco Mile Handicap (1978); Saul Silberman Handicap (1978); Donn Handicap (1979); Widener Handicap (1979)

Jumping Hill (foaled 1972 in California) was an American Thoroughbred racehorse bred by George Pope Jr. at his El Peco Ranch in Madera and successfully raced by him in England and the United States.

== Background ==
Hillary (foaled 1952) was the sire of Jumping Hill. He stood for George Pope Jr. at his El Peco Ranch and who in 1965 was considered to be the number two stallion in the United States. Hillary was a son of Rex Ellsworth's very good stallion Khaled who sired a number of top level stakes winners including U.S. Racing Hall of Fame inductee Swaps.

Jumping Hill was out of the mare Frequently, a daughter of George Pope Jr.'s 1962 Kentucky Derby winner Decidedly. Frequently's dam was Timepiece whose sire was Hall of Fame inductee Eight Thirty.

== Racing career ==
Owner George Pope Jr. sent Jumping Hill to race in England where he was trained by the highly competent Noel Murless whose career saw him earn nine National training titles and win nineteen British Classic Races. Under his race conditioning, as a four-year-old Jumping Hill won the 1976 Royal Hunt Cup at Ascot Racecourse under jockey Lester Piggott.

For 1977 Jumping Hill was brought back to race in the United States where he would be trained firstly by former jockey and future Hall of Famer Johnny Adams. His best results that year came at Santa Anita Park when he ran second in the 1977 Henry P. Russell and Morvich Handicaps. Ridden by Jerry Lambert, Jumping Hill won the 1978 San Francisco Mile Handicap.

Sent to race on the East Coast, Jumping Hill's training was taken over by another future Hall of Fame inductee, Horatio Luro of Northern Dancer fame. In the 1978 Stuyvesant Handicap at New York's Aqueduct Racetrack, Jumping Hill finished second to U.S. Triple Crown winner Seattle Slew.

Competing in Florida, on December 30, 1978 Jumping Hill was carrying top weight when he set a new Calder track record in winning the 1 1/8 mile Grade 3 Saul Silberman Handicap. Again the high-weight, in his next start on February 3, 1979 the now seven-year-old set another track record for the same distance at Gulfstream Park when he won the Grade 2 Donn Handicap. On February 17, 1979 Jumping Hill ran second to Sensitive Prince in the Gulfstream Park Handicap, pushing his opponent to a new mile and one-quarter track record. On April 7, 1979, the same day that 1978 U. S. Triple Crown winning jockey Steve Cauthen made his riding debut in England a winning one at Salisbury Racecourse, Jumping Hill won the most prestigious race of his career. Racing at Florida's Hialeah Park, Jumping Hill went wire-to-wire for his win in the Grade 1 Widener Handicap under Canadian jockey Jeffrey Fell.
