= Skip Away Stakes =

Skip Away Handicap
- Class: Listed
- Location: Gulfstream Park; Hallandale Beach, Florida, United States
- Inaugurated: Not found
- Race type: Thoroughbred - Flat racing
- Website: www.gulfstreampark.com

Race information
- Distance: 1 3/16 miles
- Surface: Dirt
- Track: left-handed
- Qualification: Four-years-old & up
- Weight: Assigned
- Purse: $100,000

The Skip Away Stakes is an American Thoroughbred horse race run annually at Gulfstream Park in Hallandale Beach, Florida. A Listed event open to horses age four and older, it is contested on dirt over a distance of 1 3/16 miles (9-1/2 furlongs). The race is a Listed event with a current purse of $100,000.

Inaugurated as the Broward Handicap, in 2001 Gulfstream Park changed the name to the Skip Away Handicap to honor 1998 American Horse of the Year, Skip Away.

In 2000, the South African-bred Horse Chestnut, 1999 Horse of the Year in his native country, made his American debut in this race, winning going away by five and one-half lengths. Other past winners of note include U.S. Racing Hall of Fame inductee Swaps who won in 1956 and set a new world record for 1 mile, 70 yards with time of 1:39 3/5.

Since its inception, the race has been run at various distances:

- 1 1/16 miles : 1987, 1990, 1993–2004
- 1 1/8 miles : 1991-1992, 2005–2008, 2016-2017
- 1 3/16 miles : 2009-2015, 2019

== Records ==
Speed record:

- 1:48.10 - Chief Honcho (at current distance of 1 1/8 miles) (1991)
- 1:53.92 - Fort Larned (at former distance of 1 3/16 miles) (2012) (This is also the track record, eclipsing the former track record set by Eddington in 2005 of 1:54.74.)

Most wins:

- 3 - Sir Bear (1998, 1999, 2002)

== Winners since 1987 ==
Year	Winner	Age	Jockey	Trainer	Owner	Time
2017	Fear The Cowboy	5	Jesus M. Rios	Efren Loza, Jr.	Kathleen Amaya	1:51.81
2016	Valid	6	Nik Juarez	Marcus J. Vitali	Crossed Sabres Farm	1:48.42
2015	Commissioner	4	Javier Castellano	Todd Pletcher	WinStar Farm	1:58.60
2014	Micromanage	4	Javier Castellano	Todd Pletcher	Repole Stable	1:55.36
2013	Cigar Street	4	John Velazquez	William I. Mott	J & L Ballis	1:56.84
2012	Fort Larned	4	Julien Leparoux	Ian Wilkes	Janis Whitham	1:53.92
2011	S. S. Stone	5	Julien Leparoux	Nick Zito	Robert V. LaPenta	1:55.73
2010	Arson Squad	7	Paco Lopez	Richard E. Dutrow, Jr.	Jay Em Ess Stable	1:55.65
2009	Finallymadeit	5	Eduardo Núñez	Javier Negrete	Rolbea Stables	1:56.76
2008	Gottcha Gold	5	Chuck C. Lopez	Edward Plesa, Jr.	Centaur Farms	1:51.31
2007	A. P. Arrow	5	Edgar Prado	Todd A. Pletcher	Allen E. Paulson Trust	1:49.70
2006	Bandini	4	John Velazquez	Todd A. Pletcher	Tabor & Smith	1:49.11
2005	Eurosilver	4	Javier Castellano	Carl Nafzger	Buckram Oak Farm	1:49.29
2004	Newfoundland	4	John Velazquez	Todd A. Pletcher	Sumaya Us Stables	1:43.26
2003	Best of the Rest	8	Eibar Coa	Edward Plesa, Jr.	Bea Oxenberg	1:42.72
2002	Sir Bear	9	Edgar Prado	Ralph Ziadie	Barbara Smollin	1:43.98
2001	American Halo	5	Robbie Davis	Angel Medina	Jose Paparoni	1:42.31
2000	Horse Chestnut	5	Mike E. Smith	Michael de Kock	Harry & Bridget Oppenheimer	1:42.78
1999	Sir Bear	6	Jerry D. Bailey	Ralph Ziadie	Barbara Smollin	1:43.66
1998	Sir Bear	5	Enrique Jurado	Ralph Ziadie	Barbara Smollin	1:43.27
1997	Crafty Friend	4	Mike E. Smith	Mark A. Hennig	Ken Karlan	1:42.27
1996	Halo's Image	5	Pat Day	Happy Alter	Alter & Appleton	1:42.71
1995	Fight For Love	5	Jerry D. Bailey	Bert Sonnier	Irving & Marjorie Cowan	1:43.98
1994	Devil His Due	5	Mike E. Smith	H. Allen Jerkens	Lion Crest Stable	1:43.17
1993	Technology	4	Jerry D. Bailey	Sonny Hine	S. Savin & Classic Partners	1:42.47
1992	Honest Ensign	4	Jean Cruguet	Guillame Soyer	Clarence Hill, Jr.	1:49.41
1991	Chief Honcho	4	Mike E. Smith	William I. Mott	Bertram R. Firestone	1:48.10
1990	Primal	5	Earlie Fires	James E. Bracken	Tartan Stable	1:43.40
1989	No Race	-	No Race	No Race	No Race	0:00.00
1988	No Race	-	No Race	No Race	No Race	0:00.00
1987	Big Blowup	3	Chuck Baltazar	J. David Braddy	not found	1:44.40
