= Enrique M. Jurado =

Peruvian jockey (born 1976)

Enrique Jurado
Personal information
- Born: Lima, Peru
- Occupation: Former Thoroughbred Jockey

Horse racing career
- Sport: Horse racing
- Career wins: 802 (USA); 256 (Peru)

Major racing wins
- Judy’s Red Shoes Stakes (1996); Needles Stakes (1996, 1998); Shocker T. Handicap (1996); Pete Axthelm Handicap (1998); Excelsior Stakes - Gr. 3 (1998); Broward Handicap - Gr. 3 (1998); De La Rose Handicap Gr. 3 (1998); Thistledown Breeders' Cup Handicap - Gr. 3 (1998); Kattegat's Pride Stakes (2005); Dave's Friend Stakes (2005); Mister Diz Stakes (2005); Fire Plug Stakes (2006)

Significant horses
- Sir Bear, Hurricane Viv, Yankee Wildcat
- Updated on June 30, 2018

Enrique M. Jurado

Enrique M. Jurado (born in Lima, Peru) is a former Thoroughbred jockey in the United States. He rode for three years at Hipódromo de Monterrico in the Lima suburb of Santiago de Surco. Emulating his countrymen Julio Pezua, Jorge Chavez, Edgar Prado and others, he emigrated to the United States in 1994 at the age of 17. He began his career in the United States riding at racetracks in Florida, such as Hialeah Park, Gulfstream Park, and Calder Race Course. Jurado went on to ride at racetracks in Delaware, Maryland, New Jersey, New York, Ohio, Pennsylvania, West Virginia and Virginia before retiring due to a career ending racing accident at Laurel Park in Maryland in 2010. He continues to work in the horse racing industry, most recently working for the Maryland Racing Commission.

Jockey Enrique M. Jurado

Among his better known hoses, Jurado rode the talented gelding, Sir Bear. Enrique Jurado won 802 races from 6,266 starts in North America and won 256 races in his native Peru prior to his arrival in the United States, for total of 1,058 wins in his career. He is a multiple Graded Stakes winning jockey in both Peru and the United States.
