= Admiral's Voyage =

American thoroughbred horse

- Sire: Crafty Admiral
- Grandsire: Fighting Fox
- Dam: Olympia Lou
- Damsire: Olympia
- Sex: Stallion
- Foaled: 1959
- Country: United States
- Colour: Dark Bay
- Breeder: Fred W. Hooper
- Owner: Fred W. Hooper
- Trainer: Chuck Parke (East Coast); Julius E. Tinsley Jr. (West Coast)
- Record: 52: 12-10-11
- Earnings: US$455,879

Major wins
- Wood Memorial Stakes (1962); Louisiana Derby (1962); Los Feliz Stakes (1962); San Miguel Stakes (1962); Carter Handicap (1963); Midwest Handicap (1963); San Carlos Handicap (1964)
- Last updated on 2020-01-18

Admiral's Voyage (1959–1989) was an American thoroughbred horse that was bred and raced by Fred W. Hooper. Admiral's Voyage won 12 out of his 52 starts during four seasons of racing, earning a total of $455,879. As a three-year-old, Admiral's Voyage won the Wood Memorial and the Louisiana Derby, finished 9th to winner Decidedly in the 1962 Kentucky Derby and was a runner-up to Jaipur in the 1962 Belmont Stakes. The colt was then sent to race in California where he won the Los Feliz and San Miguel Stakes.

== At stud ==
Admiral's Voyage was the sire of Pas de Nom who was bred to supersire Northern Dancer and produced the three-time Leading sire in North America Danzig.

== Pedigree ==
Pedigree of Admiral's Voyage, dark bay stallion, 1959
Sire Crafty Admiral	Fighting Fox	Sir Gallahad	Teddy
Sire Crafty Admiral	Fighting Fox	Sir Gallahad	Plucky Liege
Sire Crafty Admiral	Fighting Fox	Marguerite	Celt
Sire Crafty Admiral	Fighting Fox	Marguerite	Fairy Ray
Sire Crafty Admiral	Admiral's Lady	War Admiral	Man o' War
Sire Crafty Admiral	Admiral's Lady	War Admiral	Brushup
Sire Crafty Admiral	Admiral's Lady	Boola Brook	Bull Dog
Sire Crafty Admiral	Admiral's Lady	Boola Brook	Brookdale
Dam Olympia Lou	Olympia	Heliopolis	Hyperion
Dam Olympia Lou	Olympia	Heliopolis	Drift
Dam Olympia Lou	Olympia	Miss Dolphin	Stimulus
Dam Olympia Lou	Olympia	Miss Dolphin	Tinamou
Dam Olympia Lou	Louisiana Lou	Halcyon	Broomstick
Dam Olympia Lou	Louisiana Lou	Halcyon	Prudery
Dam Olympia Lou	Louisiana Lou	Creole Maid	Pharamond
Dam Olympia Lou	Louisiana Lou	Creole Maid	Baton Rouge (family: 4-n)
