= Formal Gold =

Canadian-bred Thoroughbred racehorse

- Sire: Black Tie Affair
- Grandsire: Miswaki
- Dam: Ingoldsby
- Damsire: Screen King
- Sex: Stallion
- Foaled: 1993
- Country: Canada
- Colour: Dark bay
- Breeder: Mr. & Mrs. Rodes Kelly
- Owner: John D. Murphy Sr.
- Trainer: William W. Perry
- Record: 16: 8-4-1
- Earnings: $1,533,600

Major wins
- Donn Handicap (1997); Brooklyn Handicap (1997); Philip H. Iselin Handicap (1997); Woodward Stakes (1997)

Formal Gold (foaled April 20, 1993 in Ontario) is a retired Canadian-bred Thoroughbred racehorse who raced in the United States. He is famous for defeating Hall of Fame champion Skip Away in four of their six meetings, with major stakes wins including the Woodward Stakes, Donn Handicap and Philip H. Iselin Handicap. He ran three of the eight fastest Beyer Speed Figures of the 1990s, earning him recognition as one of the best horses who never won a championship.

== Background ==
Formal Gold is a dark bay racehorse sired by Black Tie Affair, who was the 1991 Horse of the Year and the sire of 35 stakes winners including Evening Attire. Formal Gold was the fourth foal out of the Screen King mare Ingoldsby, who ultimately produced seven winners from ten foals.

Formal Gold was sold as a yearling at the 1994 Keeneland September sales for $65,000, then was resold at the Fasig-Tipton New York sales for $72,000 to John Murphy, a steelmaker from Quincy, Massachusetts. Formal Gold was conditioned by William Perry, who was a successful trainer on the mid-Atlantic circuit of racetracks including Monmouth Park and Suffolk Downs.

== Racing career ==
=== 1996: 3-year-old season ===
Formal Gold was a late developing horse, not making his initial start until June 12, 1996, halfway through his three-year-old season. His talent had already been noticed though, as he went off as the odds-on favorite in a maiden special weight race at Monmouth Park, and won by 18 3/4 lengths. The performance earned him a Beyer Speed Figure of 112, the highest ever given to a first-time starter.

Moving up to allowance company, he won his next three starts as well, all as the heavy favorite by open lengths. Formal Gold then stepped up to graded stakes company in the Pennsylvania Derby run at Philadelphia Park on September 2. He was the even money favorite in a field of six but was bumped at the start and fell to last place. He gradually made up lost ground and struck the lead in mid-stretch, but the early leader Devil's Home rallied and eventually won by 3/4 of a length. On October 4, Formal Gold entered the Grade I Meadowlands Cup Handicap, facing older horses for the first time. He again broke poorly and raced near the back of the back for the first half mile, then started to make up ground on the far turn while racing four wide. He closed well in the stretch but fell 3/4 of a length short of the winner Dramatic Gold.

Formal Gold finished his three-year-old campaign with a fifth-place finish in the Breeders' Cup Classic, behind Alphabet Soup, Louis Quatorze and favorite Cigar. Formal Gold was again hampered by a poor start and a wide trip, but made up ground late.

=== 1997: 4-year-old season ===
At the age of four, Formal Gold developed into one of the fastest horses of the 1990s, repeatedly running Beyer Speed Figures in the 120s. However, he raced at the same time as several excellent older horses, especially Skip Away, who was the champion three-year-old of 1996, champion older horse of 1997 and 1998, and would later be rated #32 on the Blood-Horse magazine List of the Top 100 U.S. Racehorses of the 20th Century.

Formal Gold started the year in the Grade I Donn Handicap at Gulfstream Park on February 8, 1997. Perry noticed that the track was favoring early speed and instructed jockey Joe Bravo to go for the early lead. Accordingly, Formal Gold led every step of the way with Skip Away unable to close the gap, finishing 1 1/4 lengths back in second. "It was like a workout", said Bravo. "We galloped right down the lane. He has speed, and he used it today." Skip Away's trainer Sonny Hine pointed out that Formal Gold benefited by carrying 10 pounds less than Skip Away (nicknamed Skippy) and received a perfect trip on the rail. "Skippy made an effort," he said. "We'll see that other horse next time."

Formal Gold shipped across country to run in the Santa Anita Handicap on March 4. He raced close to a fast early pace set by Siphon but weakened in the stretch, finishing sixth. He then shipped to Nad Al Sheba racetrack in the United Arab Emirates for the Dubai World Cup on April 3. He again raced close to the pace and was second turning into the stretch but weakened and eventually finished fifth behind Singspiel and Siphon.

After a brief layoff, Formal Gold next raced on May 31 in the $500,000 Massachusetts Handicap at his trainer's home racetrack, Suffolk Downs, where he once again faced Skip Away. Topsy Robsy set the early pace followed by Skip Away with Formal Gold a few lengths back in fourth. Skip Away moved to the lead around the far turn, where Formal Gold also started his drive, racing four wide. Formal Gold and Skip Away battled down the stretch, with Skip Away prevailing by a head. The time was just 1/5 of a second off the track record and both horses earned a Beyer Speed Figure of 122.

On June 14, Formal Gold won the Brooklyn Handicap at Belmont Park by 4 3/4 lengths in an excellent time of 1:46.21, despite a track that had been downgraded from fast to good by rain. Just three weeks later in the Suburban Handicap, Formal Gold and Skip Away hooked up for the third time, with Travers Stakes winner Wills Way also considered a major contender. "If there had been another race in two weeks, I wouldn't be running here," said Perry. "But there's nothing else to run in until the (Aug. 23) Iselin. I know we may be squeezing him a little bit, but he's doing good, so it's worth taking a shot." Ormsby and Formal Gold challenged each other for the early lead, while Skip Away and Wills Way tracked close behind. Turning into the stretch, Ormsby dropped back while Skip Away surged forward, eventually winning by 1 1/2 lengths. Wills Way and Formal Gold battled for second, with Wills Way prevailing by 3/4 of a length.

The three horses next faced off in the Whitney Handicap on August 2. Formal Gold went to the early lead with Wills Way just one length behind. Around the far turn, Wills Way closed to within a head and the two then battled down the stretch, with Wills Way finally winning by a nose. Both horses earned a Beyer Speed Figure of 126. Skip Away was well back in third.

On August 23, only two other horses were entered against Formal Gold and Skip Away in the Philip H. Iselin Handicap at Monmouth Park. Formal Gold was much the best, recovering from an awkward start to win by 5 1/4 lengths. His time for 1 1/16 miles was 1:40 1/5, breaking the old track record by 4/5 seconds and earning a Beyer Speed Figure of 124. "I rode him aggressively – much more aggressively than in the Whitney", said jockey Kent Desormeaux. "I made a couple of mistakes in the Whitney, and I wasn't going to make them again. They just couldn't keep up."

On September 20, Formal Gold was the slight favorite in the Woodward Stakes at Belmont Park, where he once again faced Skip Away and Wills Way. The three battled for the lead over the first half mile, and then Formal Gold pulled away, eventually winning by 5 1/2 lengths. Skip Away finished a neck in front of Wills Way for second, with the rest of the field 40 lengths behind. "I have never ridden a horse in my life who gives so much," said Desormeaux of Formal Gold. "He will sleep well tonight. He is a very aggressive horse all around." The win earned Formal Gold a Beyer of 125.

Formal Gold's next race was scheduled to be the Breeders' Cup Classic, held that year at Hollywood Park. But shortly after a routine gallop, Formal Gold went lame and was found to have a condylar fracture of the right hind leg. He underwent successful surgery on the leg, but was never able to race again. "I feel bad about this because Formal Gold has shown his talent all year long, and this was his chance to show it to the world", said Perry. "I really feel he was going to run a big race in the Breeders' Cup and, by winning it, would be the Horse of the Year."

Eclipse Award voting for Champion Older Male Horse was complicated by the fact that the main candidates had all beaten each other at various times. Formal Gold beat Skip Away four of the six times they faced each other, with dominant wins in both the Iselin and Woodward. The honors ultimately went to Skip Away though, who won his last two races of the year including a commanding win in the Breeders' Cup Classic. In a column discussing top Beyer Speed Figures, the Daily Racing Form says "the best horse (in terms of speed figures) was one who never won a championship and never got the acclaim he deserved: Formal Gold."

== Retirement ==
Formal Gold was initially retired to stud at Gainesway Farm in Lexington, Kentucky. He was relocated in 2004 to Rancho San Miguel in California and then to Esquirol Farms in Canada. Formal Gold has had limited success at stud, with his best offspring being Grade II winner Adore the Gold plus Grade III winners Trickle, Semaphore Man, Miss Matche and Transduction Gold.

== Hall of Fame nomination ==
On March 29, 2021, Formal Gold was one of three horses named as a finalist for induction in the Canadian Horse Racing Hall of Fame in its Thoroughbred Veteran Category.

== Pedigree ==
Pedigree of Formal Gold, dark bay horse, 1993
| Sire Black Tie Affair (IRE) 1986 | Miswaki; 1978 | Mr. Prospector | Raise a Native |
| Sire Black Tie Affair (IRE) 1986 | Miswaki; 1978 | Mr. Prospector | Gold Digger |
| Sire Black Tie Affair (IRE) 1986 | Miswaki; 1978 | Hopespringseternal | Buckpasser |
| Sire Black Tie Affair (IRE) 1986 | Miswaki; 1978 | Hopespringseternal | Rose Bower |
| Sire Black Tie Affair (IRE) 1986 | Hat Tab Girl; 1979 | Al Hattab | The Axe II |
| Sire Black Tie Affair (IRE) 1986 | Hat Tab Girl; 1979 | Al Hattab | Abyssinia |
| Sire Black Tie Affair (IRE) 1986 | Hat Tab Girl; 1979 | Desperate Action | Bold Commander |
| Sire Black Tie Affair (IRE) 1986 | Hat Tab Girl; 1979 | Desperate Action | Crafty Alice |
| Dam Ingoldsby 1985 | Screen King; 1976 | Silent Screen | Prince John |
| Dam Ingoldsby 1985 | Screen King; 1976 | Silent Screen | Prayer Bell |
| Dam Ingoldsby 1985 | Screen King; 1976 | Indian Queen | Nashua |
| Dam Ingoldsby 1985 | Screen King; 1976 | Indian Queen | Mumtaz |
| Dam Ingoldsby 1985 | Dorothy Kay; 1978 | Irish Castle | Bold Ruler |
| Dam Ingoldsby 1985 | Dorothy Kay; 1978 | Irish Castle | Castle Forbes |
| Dam Ingoldsby 1985 | Dorothy Kay; 1978 | La Eva | Barbizon |
| Dam Ingoldsby 1985 | Dorothy Kay; 1978 | La Eva | Countess Eva (family: 18-a) |

Formal Gold is inbred 5s × 4d to Nashua, meaning Nashua appears once in the fifth generation of the sire's side of the pedigree (as the sire of Gold Digger) and once in the fourth generation of the dam's side. He is also inbred 5s × 4d to Bold Ruler.
