= 1962 Kentucky Derby =

Horse race

88th Kentucky Derby
- Kentucky Derby
- Grade I stakes race
- Location: Churchill Downs
- Date: May 5, 1962
- Winning horse: Decidedly
- Jockey: Bill Hartack
- Trainer: Horatio Luro
- Owner: El Peco Ranch
- Surface: Dirt

The 1962 Kentucky Derby was the 88th running of the Kentucky Derby. The race took place on May 5, 1962. Decidedly's winning time set a new Derby record (later broken).

== Full results ==
Finished	Post	Horse	Jockey	Trainer	Owner	Time / behind
1st	3	Decidedly	Bill Hartack	Horatio Luro	El Peco Ranch (George A. Pope Jr.)	2:00 2/5
2nd	10	Roman Line	Jimmy Combest	Vester R. Wright	T. Alie Grissom	
3rd	9	Ridan	Manuel Ycaza	LeRoy Jolley	Mrs. Moody Jolley, Ernest Woods, John L. Greer	
4th	4	Sir Ribot	Raymond York	Frank E. Childs	Mr. & Mrs. Fred Turner Jr.	
5th	1	Sunrise County	Bill Shoemaker	Thomas Joseph Kelly	Townsend B. Martin	
6th	8	Crimson Satan	Billy J. Phelps	Gordon R. Potter	Crimson King Farm	
7th	5	Green Hornet	Johnny Longden	Wally Dunn	Dorothy Dorsett Brown	
8th	15	Good Fight	Ray Broussard	N. J. Moran	F and B Farms	
9th	2	Admiral's Voyage	Braulio Baeza	Charles R. Parke	Fred W. Hooper	
10th	6	Royal Attack	Edward Burns	William J. Hirsch	Neil S. McCarthy	
11th	14	Touch Bar	John R. Rivera	J. L. Davis	Estopinal-Arnaud	
12th	13	Lee Town	William Carstens	H. L. Mckissick	J. V. P. Stables	
13th	7	Mister Pitt	William Harmatz	Stephen A. DiMauro	Golden Triangle Stables	
14th	12	Sharp Count	Eugene Curry	L. G. Jeffrion	Reverie Knoll Farm	
15th	11	Prego	Larry Adams	Thomas Mercer Waller	Robert Lehman	

- Winning Breeder: George A. Pope Jr.; (CA)
