= Steve Allday =

American equine veterinarian (born 1957)

Steven Allday (born 1957) is an American equine veterinarian specializing in lameness and sports medicine. He lives on a farm in Simpsonville, Kentucky, just west of the bluegrass horse region. Allday is known for his work in the Thoroughbred and Standardbred industries, primarily because of his association with several prominent equine patients and their trainers.

== Biography ==
Allday was born in 1957 in Huntsville, Texas. When he was one year old, his mother and father moved to Maryland, where they had bought a horse farm that included Thoroughbreds, Quarter Horses, and show horses. It was here that he became accustomed to working with and taking care of horses, including assisting veterinarians who were occasionally called in. He became interested in horse lameness, in particular, when one of the family Quarter Horses developed a particularly difficult case. After trying many treatments, the family was referred to the lameness expert, Edwin A. Churchill.

As a result of these experiences, Allday decided to study veterinary science, which he did at Texas A&M University. Allday had stayed in touch with Churchill and interned with him in 1984. After graduation in 1985, Allday began his equine veterinary practice in upstate New York. While in New York, he got a job with Kenneth Seeber, who, like Churchill, specialized in lameness. Allday practiced in Southern California for three years, as a private veterinarian for Allen Paulson Racing and worked with famed thoroughbred trainers such as Neil Drysdale and Alex Hassinger. He then practiced as a private veterinarian for a Toronto-based racing operation. Allday moved to Kentucky in 1996, where he opened his current practice.

Allday is a co-developer of LubriSyn, a joint supplement. This liquid supplement is a daily, oral version of hyaluronic acid (HA), also called sodium hyaluronate, which had normally been administered by injection. HA is used to promote normal joint function, and to improve joint comfort and performance. LubriSyn is available for horses, humans, and pets.

Allday's most recent contribution to the equine world is an online community where equine experts come together with horse lovers. The free site features informational videos about horse care and horse health. It also features interactive means of asking the experts including a forum.

== Career ==
Allday is known as the "best diagnostic vet in the business" and is in demand across the United States. He has treated Thoroughbred Horses of the Year (A.P. Indy 1992, Cigar 1995–1996, and Favorite Trick 1997), as well as winners of 13 Triple Crown races and 29 Breeders' Cup races. Notable patients include Point Given, Saint Liam, Summer Squall, Hansel, Silver Charm, Real Quiet, Victory Gallop, Fusaichi Pegasus, Red Bullet, Empire Maker, Rags to Riches, Super Saver, Macho Uno, War Chant, Kalonski, Perfect Sting, Squirtle Squirt, Starine, Ghostzapper, Ashado, Speightstown, Silver Train, English Channel, Midnight Lute, Ginger Punch, Kip Deville, Tapitsfly, Uncle Mo, More Than Real, and Pluck.

In 2013, he became a member of the board of directors of Old Friends Equine, a retirement home for thoroughbreds.

Notable equine exposure includes: Bloodhorse, TRRN-weekly spot (Thoroughbred Racing Radio Network), and many more.
