= Gulfstream Park Mile Stakes =

- Class: Grade II
- Location: Gulfstream Park; Hallandale Beach, Florida
- Inaugurated: 1946
- Race type: Thoroughbred – Flat racing
- Website: www.gulfstreampark.com

Race information
- Distance: 1 mile (8 furlongs)
- Surface: Dirt
- Track: left-handed
- Qualification: Four-year-olds & up
- Weight: 124 lbs. with allowances
- Purse: $200,000 (since 2021)

The Gulfstream Park Mile Stakes (formerly known as the Gulfstream Park Handicap) is a race for thoroughbred horses run at Gulfstream Park each year. The race is open to horses age four and up, willing to race one mile on the dirt. A Grade II event run in early March, it currently offers a purse of $200,000.

== History ==
The Gulfstream Park Handicap was first run in 1946. It was won the next year in track record time by Armed, dubbed "the greatest attraction ever offered at his young seaside course" by the New York Times. In 1948 Rampart became the first female horse to win the race, defeating Armed at odds of 26–1.

Graded stakes race status:

- Grade II : 1973–1974, 2003–present
- Grade 1 : 1975–2002

In 1997, Barbara Minshall became the first female trainer to win the race in its fifty-two-year history.

As part of his record seven wins of this race, Hall of Fame jockey Jerry Bailey won this race four times in a row from 1995 through 1998.

The distance of the race was set at one mile in 2009. It was run at 1 3/16 miles from 2005 to 2008, and at 1 1/4 miles before that time.

== Records ==
Speed record:

- 1 mile – 1:33.80 – Palace Malice (2014)
- 1 3/16 miles – 1:54.74 – Eddington (2005)
- 1 1/4 miles – 1:59.00 – Mat-Boy (1984)

Most wins:

- 2 – Crafty Admiral (1952, 1953)
- 2 – Skip Trial (1986, 1987)
- 2 – Behrens (1999, 2000)

Most wins by a jockey:

- 7 – Jerry Bailey (1977, 1988, 1990, 1995, 1996, 1997, 1998)

Most wins by a trainer:

- 7 – Todd Pletcher (2006, 2013, 2014, 2015, 2016, 2021, 2025)

== Winners ==
Year	Winner	Age	Jockey	Trainer	Owner	Dist. (Miles)	Time	Purse
2026	Knightbridge	5	Junior Alvarado	William I. Mott	Godolphin Racing	1 mile	1:35.77	$200,000
2025	Mindframe	4	Irad Ortiz Jr.	Todd A. Pletcher	Repole Stables & St. Elias Stable	1 Mile	1:36.25	$200,000
2024	Steal Sunshine	5	Paco Lopez	Bobby S. Dibona	Jules & Michael Iavarone, Carrie L. Brogden, Kevin J. Pollard, Ed Gorry & David Menard	1 Mile	1:35.74	$200,000
2023	Endorsed	7	Tyler Gaffalione	Michael J. Maker	Mark D. Breen	1 Mile	1:35.25	$200,000
2022	Speakers Corner	4	Junior Alvarado	William I. Mott	Godolphin Inc.	1 Mile	1:33.84	$200,000
2021	Fearless	5	Irad Ortiz Jr.	Todd Pletcher	Winstar Farm LLC & CHC Inc.	1 Mile	1:35.61	$200,000
2020	Mr Freeze	5	Manuel Franco	Dale Romans	Jim Bakke & Gerry Isbister	1 mile	1:34.80	$300,000
2019	Prince Lucky	4	John R. Velazquez	Todd Pletcher	Daniel McConnell	1 mile	1:35.20	$300,000
2018	Conquest Big E	5	Jose A. Batista	Donna Green Hurtak	Daniel C. Hurtack	1 mile	1:35.92	$300,000
2017	Sharp Azteca	4	Edgard J. Zayas	Jorge Navarro	Gelfenstein Farm (Ivan Rodriguez Gelfenstein)	1 mile	1:34.55	$350,000
2016	Blofeld	4	John Velazquez	Todd Pletcher	Glencrest Farm/JSM Equine	1 mile	1:35.03	$500,000
2015	Honor Code	5	Javier Castellano	Claude McGaughey III	Lane's End Racing/Dell Ridge Farm	1 mile	1:36.42	$300,000
2014	Palace Malice	5	John R. Velazquez	Todd Pletcher	Dogwood Stable	1 mile	1:33.80	$250,000
2013	Discreet Dancer	5	Javier Castellano	Todd Pletcher	E. Paul Robsham Stables	1 mile	1:35.17	$300,000
2012	Mucho Macho Man	4	Ramon A. Dominguez	Katherine Ritvo	Reeves Thoroughbred/Dream Team One	1 mile	1:35.50	$300,000
2011	Tackleberry	4	Javier Santiago	Luis Olivares	Luis Olivares	1 mile	1:35.23	$300,000
2010	You and I Forever	5	Javier Castellano	Martin D. Wolfson	Edmund A. Gann	1 mile	1:36.83	$300,000
2009	Smooth Air	4	Paco Lopez	Bennie Stutts Jr.	Mount Joy Stables, Inc. (Brian & Jan Burns)	1 mile	1:35.49	$300,000
2008	Sir Whimsey	4	Edgar Prado	James J. Toner	Turtle Bird Stables, Inc. (Harvey Weinstein)	1 3/16	1:56.96	$343,000
2007	Corinthian	4	Javier Castellano	James A. Jerkens	Centennial Farms (Donald V. Little Sr.)	1 3/16	1:55.06	$300,000
2006	Harlington	4	John R. Velazquez	Todd Pletcher	Eugene Melnyk	1 3/16	1:55.18	$300,000
2005	Eddington	4	Eibar Coa	Mark A. Hennig	Willmott Stables, Inc. (Peter Willmott)	1 3/16	1:54.74	$300,000
2004	Jackpot	6	Joe Bravo	C. R. McGaughey III	Cynthia Phipps	1 1/4	2:02.80	$300,000
2003	Hero's Tribute	5	Edgar Prado	John T. Ward Jr.	John C. Oxley	1 1/4	2:04.24	$300,000
2002	Hal's Hope	5	Roger Velez	Harold J. Rose	Harold J. Rose	1 1/4	2:02.91	$300,000
2001	Sir Bear	8	Eibar Coa	Ralph G. Ziadie	Barbara Smollin	1 1/4	2:02.96	$300,000
2000	Behrens	6	Jorge Chavez	H. James Bond	Rudlein Stable (Donald & Anne Rudder)	1 1/4	2:01.79	$350,000
1999	Behrens	5	Jorge Chavez	H. James Bond	Rudlein Stable (Donald & Anne Rudder)	1 1/4	2:01.91	$300,000
1998	Skip Away	5	Jerry Bailey	Sonny Hine	Carolyn Hine	1 1/4	2:03.21	$300,000
1997	Mt. Sassafras	5	Jerry Bailey	Barbara J. Minshall	Minshall Farms	1 1/4	2:02.39	$300,000
1996	Wekiva Springs	5	Jerry Bailey	William I. Mott	D. Dizney / J. English	1 1/4	2:03.18	$300,000
1995	Cigar	5	Jerry Bailey	William I. Mott	Allen E. Paulson	1 1/4	2:02.95	$300,000
1994	Scuffleburg	5	Craig Perret	William I. Mott	Matthew K. Firestone	1 1/4	2:00.46	$300,000
1993	Devil His Due	4	Herb McCauley	H. Allen Jerkens	Edith LiButti	1 1/4	2:01.33	$300,000
1992	Sea Cadet	4	Alex Solis	Ron McAnally	Verne H. Winchell	1 1/4	2:01.79	$300,000
1991	Jolie's Halo	4	Robin Platts	Happy Alter	Arthur I. Appleton	1 1/4	2:01.04	$300,000
1990	Mi Selecto	5	Jerry Bailey	Angel Penna Sr.	Frank Stronach	1 1/4	2:03.60	$300,000
1989	Slew City Slew	5	Ángel Cordero Jr.	D. Wayne Lukas	Tayhill Stable/H. Joseph Allen	1 1/4	2:03.20	$300,000
1988	Jade Hunter	4	Jerry Bailey	Richard J. Lundy	Summa Stable/Allen E. Paulson	1 1/4	2:01.60	$300,000
1987	Skip Trial	5	Randy Romero	Sonny Hine	Zelda Cohen	1 1/4	2:02.80	$250,000
1986	Skip Trial	4	Randy Romero	Sonny Hine	Zelda Cohen	1 1/4	2:03.20	$300,000
1985	Dr. Carter	4	Jorge Velásquez	Scotty Schulhofer	Frances A. Genter	1 1/4	2:02.00	$285,000
1984	Mat-Boy	5	Jorge Valdivieso	Armando Bani	Noroma Stable	1 1/4	1:59.00	$141,616
1983	Christmas Past	4	Jorge Velásquez	Angel Penna Jr.	Cynthia Phipps	1 1/4	2:02.60	$111,630
1982	Lord Darnley	4	Mary L. Russ	Roger Laurin	Jacqueline Getty Phillips	1 1/4	2:01.80	$152,000
1981	Hurry Up Blue	4	Carlos Lopez	Reynoldo Nobles	Due Process Stable	1 1/4	2:03.20	$191,480
1980	Private Account	4	Jeffrey Fell	Angel Penna Sr.	Ogden Phipps	1 1/4	2:01.40	$150,000
1979	Sensitive Prince	4	Jacinto Vásquez	H. Allen Jerkens	Top the Marc Stable (Joseph Taub)	1 1/4	1:59.20	$150,000
1978	Bowl Game	4	Jorge Velásquez	John M. Gaver Jr.	Greentree Stable	1 1/4	2:00.60	$150,000
1977	Strike Me Lucky	5	Jerry D. Bailey	Neal J. Winick	Maribel G. Blum	1 1/4	2:00.80	$147,000
1976	Hail The Pirates	6	Braulio Baeza	Horatio Luro	John A. Bell III	1 1/4	2:01.80	$122,600
1975	Gold and Myrrh	4	Walter Blum	William F. Wilmot	William F. Wilmot	1 1/4	2:01.80	$124,200
1974	Forego	4	Heliodoro Gustines	Sherrill W. Ward	Lazy F Ranch	1 1/4	1:59.80	$120,600
1973	West Coast Scout	5	Larry Adams	Mervyn J. Marks	Ralph C. Wilson Jr.	1 1/4	2:01.00	$134,800
1972	Executioner	4	Carlos Barrera	Edward J. Yowell	October House Farm (Peter F. F. Kissel)	1 1/4	2:04.00	$134,800
1971	Fast Hilarious	5	Craig Perret	Joseph M. Bollero	Dorothy C. Rigney	1 1/4	1:59.40	$128,400
1970	Snow Sporting	4	Álvaro Pineda	Warren R. Stute	Clement L. Hirsch	1 1/4	2:04.00	$123,600
1969	Court Recess	5	Mike Miceli	George T. Poole	Cornelius Vanderbilt Whitney	1 1/4	2:01.40	$126,400
1968	Gentleman James	4	Richard Grubb	Delmer W. Carroll Sr.	Michael G. Phipps	1 1/4	2:02.20	$126,000
1967	Pretense	4	Johnny Sellers	Charles E. Whittingham	Llangollen Farm Stable	1 1/4	2:01.80	$137,600
1966	First Family	4	Casey Hayes	Earlie Fires	Meadow Stable	1 1/4	2:03.00	$114,200
1965	Ampose	4	Kennard Knapp	Douglas Dodson	Gray Willows Farm	1 1/4	2:04.40	$111,900
1964	Gun Bow	4	Bill Shoemaker	Edward A. Neloy	Gedney Farm (Mrs. John T. Stanley & Harry Albert)	1 1/4	2:01.80	$116,600
1963	Kelso	6	Ismael Valenzuela	Carl Hanford	Bohemia Stable	1 1/4	2:03.20	$110,500
1962	Jay Fox *	4	Larry Gilligan	James W. Smith	Brae Burn Farm (James O. McCue)	1 1/4	2:01.60	$112,800
1961	Tudor Way	5	Bill Hartack	Juan J. D'Agostino	Juan J. D'Agostino	1 1/4	2:01.60	$114,000
1960	Bald Eagle	5	Manuel Ycaza	Woody Stephens	Cain Hoy Stable	1 1/4	2:01.20	$121,500
1959	Vertex	5	Sam Boulmetis Sr.	Joseph F. Piarulli	Frank A. Piarulli & John J. Brunetti Sr.	1 1/4	2:01.60	$121,800
1958	Round Table	4	Bill Shoemaker	William Molter	Kerr Stable	1 1/4	1:59.80	$110,900
1957	Bardstown	5	Bill Hartack	Horace A. Jones	Calumet Farm	1 1/4	2:00.40	$126,600
1956	Sailor	4	Bill Hartack	Preston M. Burch	Brookmeade Stable	1 1/4	2:00.60	$112,900
1955	Mister Black	6	John H. Adams	Harry E. Trotsek	Hasty House Farm (Allie E. Reuben)	1 1/4	2:01.80	$66,250
1954	Wise Margin	4	Keith Stuart	Sam N. Edmundson	Sam Tufano	1 1/4	2:02.80	$66,100
1953	Crafty Admiral	5	Kenneth Church	Robert B. Odom	Charfran Stable (Charles & Frances Cohen)	1 1/4	2:00.80	$59,500
1952	Crafty Admiral	4	Con Errico	Robert B. Odom	Charfran Stable (Charles & Frances Cohen)	1 1/4	2:01.00	$28,250
1951	Ennobled	5	James Stout	Frank Catrone	William G. Helis Jr.	1 1/4	2:01.60	$15,000
1950	Chicle II	5	Hedley Woodhouse	Joseph H. Pierce Sr.	Palatine Stable (Frank Rosen)	1 1/4	2:03.00	$15,000
1949	Coaltown	4	Ovie Scurlock	Ben A. Jones	Calumet Farm	1 1/4	1:59.80	$20,000
1948	Rampart	6	Mike Basile	Richard "Whitey" Nixon	Helene K. Haggerty	1 1/4	2:02.00	$27,400
1947	Armed	6	Douglas Dodson	Ben A. Jones	Calumet Farm	1 1/4	2:01.40	$30,350
1946	Do-Reigh-Mi	5	Bobby Strange	Robert B. Carroll	Vera S. Bragg	1 1/4	2:07.60	$15,000

* In 1962, Yorky won the race but was disqualified and set back to second place.

== See also ==
- Gulfstream Park Handicap top three finishers and starters
