= Ivor G. Balding =

British polo player (1908–2005)

Personal information
- Born: 23 May 1908 Leicestershire, England
- Died: 20 January 2005 (aged 96) Camden, South Carolina, U.S.
- Occupation: Trainer

Horse racing career
- Sport: Horse racing

Major racing wins
- New York Handicap (1962); Massachusetts Handicap (1966, 1971); Matron Stakes (1966); Edgemere Handicap (1966); Spinaway Stakes (1966); Garden State Stakes (1967); Travers Stakes (1968); Juvenile Stakes (1969); Bed O' Roses Handicap (1970); Demoiselle Stakes (1970); Dixie Stakes (1971)

Racing awards
- Champion trainer at Saratoga Race Course (1966)

Significant horses
- Chompion

Ivor Godfrey Balding (23 May 1908 – 20 January 2005) was a British champion polo player, thoroughbred farm manager and racehorse trainer.

== Biography ==
=== Breeding farm manager ===
Ivor Balding had two brothers who also played polo, Gerald Balding and Barney Balding. He moved to the United States in 1930 where he attended Cornell University. In 1936, he went to work for the Thoroughbred breeding farm of Sonny Whitney in Old Westbury, New York. Three years later Whitney appointed him manager of his key breeding operation in Lexington, Kentucky.

During his tenure in Lexington, Whitney imported Mahmoud from England where he had won the 1936 Epsom Derby. Brought to the United States in 1940, Mahmoud would be the Leading sire in North America in 1946 and the Leading broodmare sire in North America for 1957. Of bloodlines worldwide, Mahmoud was the broodmare sire of Natalma, dam of the Northern Dancer who became a successful sire in the 20th Century and whom the National Thoroughbred Racing Association calls "one of the most influential sires in Thoroughbred history".

=== Training career ===
From 1961 to 1992, Ivor Balding was the head trainer for Whitney's racing stable during which time he earned the leading trainer title in 1966 at Saratoga Race Course. He died at age 96 in Camden, South Carolina.
