= 2005 Breeders' Cup =

Thoroughbred horse racing event

- Class: Championship Event Series
- Location: Belmont Park
- Race type: Thoroughbred
- Website: www.breederscup.com

Race information
- Distance: See individual races
- Surface: Turf, Dirt
- Track: Left-handed
- Purse: Varies by race; Between $1,000,000 – $4 million

The 2005 Breeders' Cup World Championships was the 22nd edition of the premier event of the North American thoroughbred horse racing year. The eight races, all of which were Grade I, took place on October 29 at Belmont Park in Elmont, New York and were telecast by NBC. The Breeders' Cup is generally regarded as the end of the North America racing season, although a few Grade I events take place in later November and December, primarily now for Road to the Kentucky Derby events for horses to gain points toward qualifying for those races. The results of the races were highly influential in that year's Eclipse Award voting.

The highlight of the event was Saint Liam's victory in the Classic, wrapping up a campaign that earned him Horse of the Year honors.

== Lead-up ==
In 2005, Belmont Park celebrated its 100th anniversary and hosted the Breeders' Cup for the fourth time. At the time, Belmont Park was part of a regular rotation of the event between racetracks on the East Coast, West Coast (Hollywood Park or Santa Anita), Kentucky (Churchill Downs) and Florida (Gulfstream Park) with smaller venues also used on occasion. Despite the success of the 2005 event, Belmont Park has not played host since that time.

Most of the races had a strong morning-line favorite, led by four horses who were unbeaten in 2005 and some returning champions:

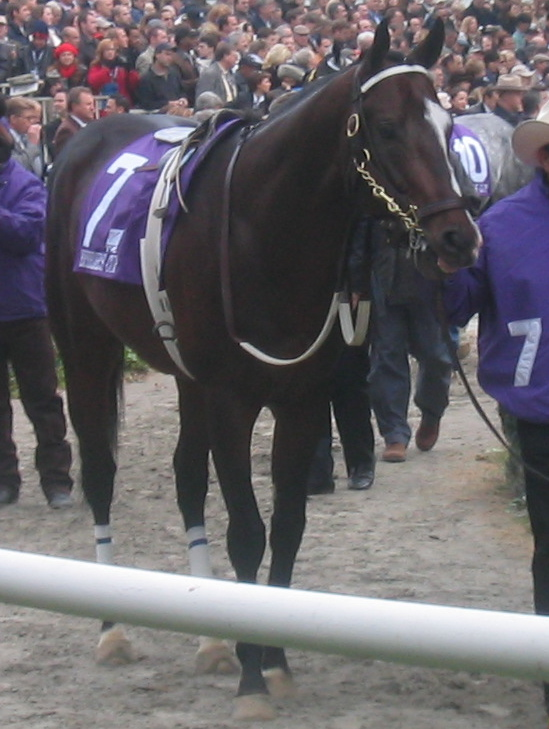
Lost in the Fog before the Sprint

- In the Sprint, Lost in the Fog was an even money favorite after winning 10 races in a row at tracks across the country. With a win at the Breeders' Cup, he would have been considered a contender for Horse of the Year honors.
- First Samurai was the 8-5 favorite for the Juvenile after winning all 4 of his starts, including the Champagne Stakes.
- Leroidesanimaux, who had won all 3 of his starts in 2005, was the 7-5 favorite in the Mile.
- Shakespeare was the 3-1 morning line favorite in the Turf after 5 straight wins, including the Joe Hirsch Turf Classic. He faced a strong field of European contenders, who tended to dominate in this race.
- Ouija Board, who had won the 2004 Filly & Mare Turf, was heavily favored to repeat despite having only one win in 2005. She had suffered a minor stress fracture earlier in the year when finishing unplaced in the Prince of Wales's Stakes.
- Ashado, winner of the 2004 Distaff, was also favored to repeat.
- Folklore was the slight favorite in the Juvenile Fillies after a 14 length win in the Matron.

However, the Classic was considered wide open, in part because of the injury or retirement of several stars including dual Classic winner Afleet Alex and the 2004 Horse of the Year Ghostzapper. In their absence, Saint Liam was slightly favored over Rock Hard Ten and Borrego in a full field of 14.

== Results ==
A crowd of 54,289 attended the event and bet $14.6 million on-track, then the largest handle in Belmont Park history. Only two favorites won and they had been considered the most vulnerable according to the morning line odds: Folklore and Saint Liam. Saint Liam's job was made easier by the late scratch of 2nd favorite Rock Hard Ten. He had however drawn an outside post position, which was a particular disadvantage as the Classic started on the clubhouse turn due to the dimensions of Belmont Park. Saint Liam broke poorly but jockey Jerry Bailey got him to settle before starting his move on the far turn. Saint Liam dueled with Flower Alley down the stretch, then drew away in the last 100 yards. "You shouldn't dismiss the fact that the post this horse had breaking," said Bailey. "He took the worst of it today, and still was very authoritative in winning."

The most disappointing performance was by Lost in the Fog, who would finish unplaced after starting his career with 10 straight wins. It is possible that he was already suffering the effects of the cancer that was diagnosed in August of the next year. In the Filly & Mare Turf, Ouija Board made a late run but could not catch front-running Intercontinental. Ashado was defeated by 30-1 longshot Pleasant Home, who made an explosive move from last to first and won by 9 1/4 lengths, the largest margin of victory at the 2005 Breeders' Cup.

Stevie Wonderboy posted a slight upset in the Juvenile, and the impressive performance combined with an earlier win in the Del Mar Futurity earned him Champion Two-Year-Old honors. It was the first win at the Breeders' Cup for owner Merv Griffin, trainer Doug O'Neill and jockey Garrett Gomez. Stevie Wonderboy became the early favorite for the 2006 Kentucky Derby but suffered a condylar fracture while in training for the race.

Shirocco became the first German-bred horse to win a Breeders' Cup race when he topped an "all-European trifecta" over Ace and Azamour in the Turf. Jockey Christophe Soumillon said, "(Shirocco) likes soft ground and a good pace to run at and with the pacemaker in there, we got both today. When I got to the turn, I just wanted to let him go and not try to pull him back to mix up his action. We got two (lengths) in front and when he saw the wire, he just flew home."

Several jockeys and trainers achieved notable results at the event. Jerry Bailey earned his fifteenth Breeders' Cup win on Saint Liam in the Classic – then a record. Garrett Gomez won both the Juvenile on Stevie Wonderboy and Mile on Artie Schiller, earning him the Shoemaker Award for outstanding performance by a jockey at the Breeders' Cup. Edgar Prado had also been under consideration for the award after scoring two wins of his own. Both Prado and Gomez had been winless at the Breeders' Cup prior to 2005. Trainer D. Wayne Lukas scored a record 18th victory with Folklore in the Juvenile Fillies. Trainer Rick Dutrow, who had served a 60-day suspension earlier in the year, trained two winners – Saint Liam in the Classic and Silver Train in the Sprint.

The races were telecast live by NBC, while Sirius Satellite Radio produced an 8-hour radio broadcast hosted by track announcer Dave Johnson.

In the 2005 Eclipse Award voting, four Breeders' Cup winners went on to be named the champion in their divisions (Stevie Wonderboy, Folklore, Saint Liam and Intercontinental), with Saint Liam also being named Horse of the Year.

Race name	Post time	Sponsor	Distance/Surface	Restrictions	Purse	Winner (Bred)	Final Odds	Margin
Juvenile Fillies	1:22 PM	Alberto VO5	1 1/16 miles	2-year-old fillies	$1 million	Folklore	2.35	1 1/4 lengths
Juvenile	2:01 PM	Bessemer Trust	1 1/16 miles	2-year-old colts and geldings	$1.5 million	Stevie Wonderboy	4.50	1 1/4 lengths
Filly & Mare Turf	2:40 PM	Emirates	1 1/4 miles (Turf)	3 yrs+ fillies & mares	$1 million	Intercontinental (GB)	15.10	1 1/4 lengths
Sprint	3:15 PM	TVG	6 furlongs	3 yrs+	$1 million	Silver Train	11.90	Head
Mile	3:51 PM	NetJets	1 mile (Turf)	3 yrs+	$1.5 million	Artie Schiller	5.60	3/4 lengths
Distaff	4:32 PM	Emirates	1 1/8 miles	3 yrs+ fillies & mares	$2 million	Pleasant Home	30.75	9 1/4 lengths
Turf	5:02 PM	John Deere	1 1/2 miles (Turf)	3 yrs+	$2 million	Shirocco (GER)	8.80	1 3/4 lengths
Classic	5:42 PM	powered by Dodge	1 1/4 miles	3 yrs+	$4 million	Saint Liam	2.40	1 length

Source: Equibase
