= Chompion =

American-bred Thoroughbred racehorse

- Sire: Tompion
- Grandsire: Tom Fool
- Dam: Mahratta
- Damsire: Mahmoud
- Sex: Stallion
- Foaled: May 21, 1965
- Country: United States
- Colour: Bay
- Breeder: Cornelius Vanderbilt Whitney
- Owner: 1) Cornelius Vanderbilt Whitney; 2) Colonial Farms
- Trainer: 1) Ivor G. Balding; 2) Joe Kulina
- Record: 88: 14-14-15
- Earnings: US$604,401

Major wins
- Travers Stakes (1968); Brighton Beach Handicap (1969, 1970); Stymie Handicap (1969); Seneca Handicap (1970); Getaway Day Stakes (1970); Massachusetts Handicap (1971); Pan American Handicap (1971); Dixie Handicap (1971); Quaker Handicap (1971)

Chompion (foaled 1965 in Kentucky) was an American Thoroughbred racehorse bred and raced by C. V. "Sonny" Whitney and trained by Ivor Balding.

In June 1971, then owner John Fieramosca announced that Chompion would be retired to stud at his Colonial Farms beginning with the 1972 season.
