= Behrens (horse) =

American Thoroughbred racehorse

- Sire: Pleasant Colony
- Grandsire: His Majesty
- Dam: Hot Novel
- Damsire: Mari's Book
- Sex: Stallion
- Foaled: 1994
- Country: United States
- Colour: Bay
- Breeder: Joanne Nor
- Owner: William Clifton, Jr. and Rudlein Stable
- Trainer: H. James Bond
- Record: 27: 9-8-3
- Earnings: $4,563,500

Major wins
- Dwyer Stakes (1997); Pegasus Handicap (1997); Massachusetts Handicap (1999); Suburban Handicap (1999); Oaklawn Handicap (1999); Gulfstream Park Handicap (1999, 2000)
- Last updated on August 16, 2008

Behrens (1994 – September 14, 2014) was an American Thoroughbred racehorse. Out of the mare Hot Novel, he was sired by the 1981 Kentucky Derby and Preakness Stakes winner, Pleasant Colony.

Raced by William Clifton Jr. and the Rudlein Stable of Donald and Anne Rudder, Behrens did not race until age three when he made a winning debut in January 1997 at Gulfstream Park in Hallandale Beach, Florida. He did not race for another six months as a result of arthroscopic surgery for an ankle chip. On his return to competition, Behrens won again then in July at Belmont Park in Elmont, New York, won the Dwyer Stakes. In the August Travers Stakes at Saratoga Race Course, Behrens finished second by a nose to Deputy Commander, then in September scored a 5¾ length win in the Pegasus Handicap at the Meadowlands Racetrack in New Jersey in which he beat a field that included the heavily favored Touch Gold. In that year's Breeders' Cup Classic, Behrens disappointed his backers with a seventh-place finish.

At age five Behrens had his best season in racing. His wins in 1999 included the Grade I's Gulfstream Park Handicap and Oaklawn Handicap, the Grade II Suburban Handicap, plus the Massachusetts Handicap in which he defeated Real Quiet. In addition, Behrens earned second-place in the Donn Handicap, Whitney Handicap and the Jockey Club Gold Cup Stakes. However, with a chance at Horse of the Year honors he finished a dull 7th in the Breeders Cup Classic behind Cat Thief.

As a six-year-old, Behrens won his second straight Grade I Gulfstream Park Handicap, was second to Dubai Millennium in the Dubai World Cup, and had seconds in the Woodward Stakes and Suburban Handicap.

Behrens stood stud at Victory Rose Thoroughbreds in Vacaville, California. His foals earned more than $4.1 million, with one stakes winner, four stakes-placed runners, and 103 winners from 209 total foals. In 2013, he was pensioned to Old Friends in New York.
