= Massachusetts Handicap =

Former flat horse race

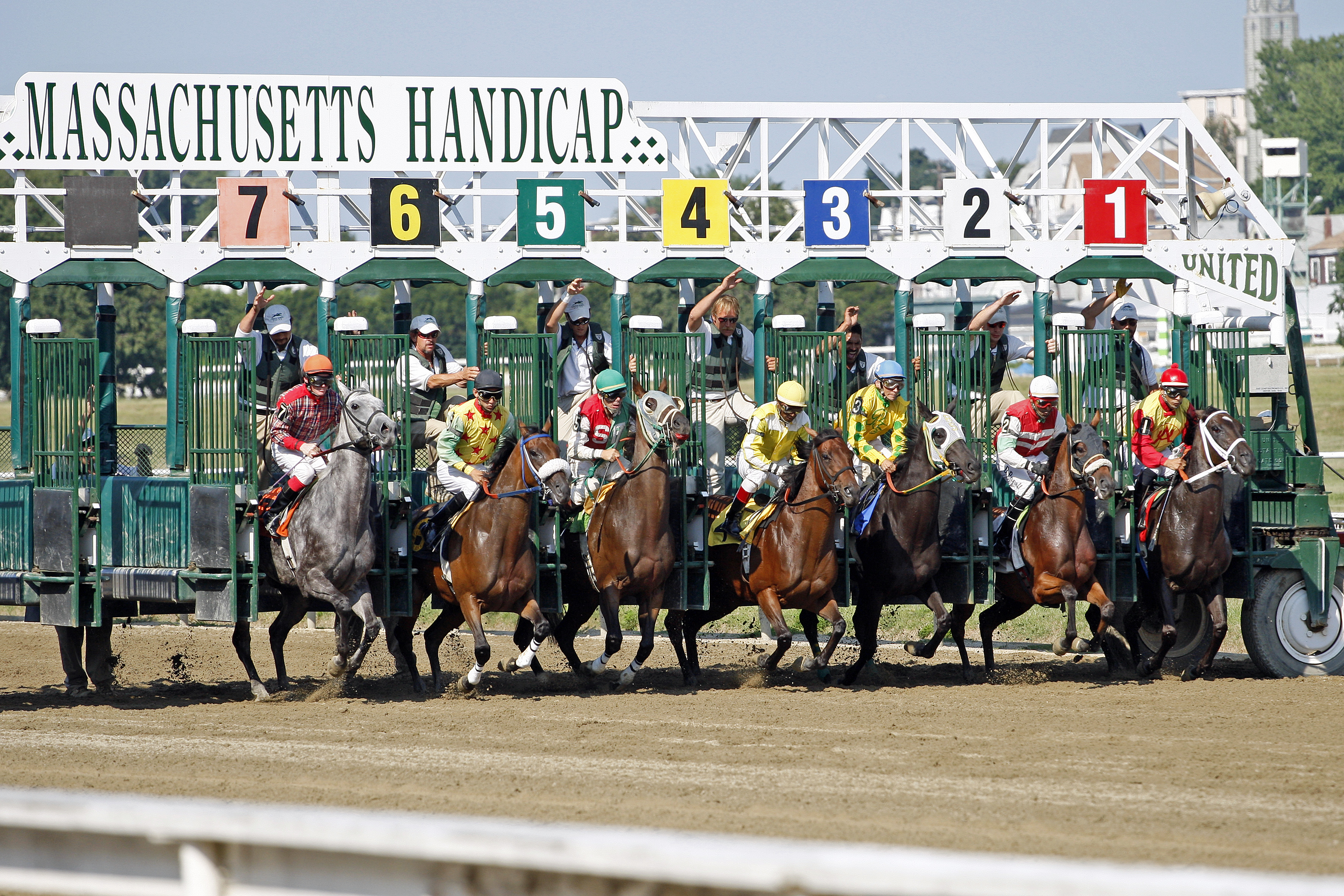
- Starting gate at Suffolk Downs.
- Class: Ungraded
- Location: Suffolk Downs; East Boston, Massachusetts, United States
- Inaugurated: October 16, 1935
- Final run: 2008
- Race type: Thoroughbred – Flat
- Website: Official website

Race information
- Distance: 1 1/8 miles (9.0 furlongs; 1.8 km); 1 1/2 miles (12 furlongs; 2.4 km) (1970–1971); 1 1/4 miles (10 furlongs; 2.0 km) (1948–1969)
- Surface: Dirt; Turf (1970–1971)
- Track: Left-handed
- Qualification: 3 years old and up
- Weight: Handicap
- Purse: $500,000
- Bonuses: $200,000 $100,000

The Massachusetts Handicap, frequently referred to as the "MassCap", was a flat thoroughbred horse race for three-year-olds and up held annually at Suffolk Downs in East Boston, Massachusetts, United States. It was an ungraded stakes race run over a distance of 9 furlongs on dirt. The race received Grade III status by the American Graded Stakes Committee for 2009, but the race was never held. The MassCap was stripped of its graded status in 2011 as a result of not being run for two consecutive years.

== History ==
The Massachusetts Handicap was won by some of the biggest names in Thoroughbred racing history including Hall of Fame inductees Riva Ridge, Stymie, Seabiscuit, Eight Thirty and Triple Crown winner Whirlaway who broke the track record in his 1942 win. On August 7, 1937, the great Seabiscuit won his seventh consecutive stakes race in track record time for the $70,000 purse of the 1937 MassCap.

The MassCap had been a graded stakes race from 1973 through 1989. Notables horses such as Riva Ridge, Dixieland Band, and Private Terms all won during this time frame. In 1987, Waquoit beat Broad Brush in a thrilling race. In the 1955 Massachusetts Handicap, jockey Sam Boulmetis, Sr. rode Helioscope to a track record time of 2:01 for 1 1/4 miles (2.0 km).

The Suffolk Downs track continued to fight for its economic life since closing for a three-year period beginning in 1989. The MassCap was a frequent casualty of those circumstances.

Later, in an attempt to bring the MassCap back to its former glory, new ownership offered a purse of $500,000 in 1995 and quickly drew the likes of Cigar and Skip Away to the track. By 1997, the race was, once again, a graded race. Suffolk Downs also provided a bonus of $200,000 if the winner won multiple Grade I or Group 1 stakes races at a mile or longer. An additional $100,000 was to be awarded if the winner had won one Grade I or Group 1 race and at least one other graded stakes race at a mile or longer in 2007.

Part of the Breeders' Cup Challenge series, the winner of the 2008 Massachusetts Handicap -- which would prove to be the final MassCap held -- automatically qualified for the Breeders' Cup Classic.

== Records ==
Time record:

- 1 1/8 miles (9.0 furlongs; 1.8 km): 1:47.27 – Skip Away (1998) (new track record)

Largest margin of victory:

- 14 lengths – Commentator (2008)

Most wins:

- 2 – First Fiddle (1944, 1945), Air Pilot (1959, 1962), Smart (1964, 1965), Cigar (1995, 1996), Skip Away (1997, 1998)

Most wins by a jockey:

- 4 – Jerry D. Bailey (1995, 1996, 1998, 2001)

Most wins by a trainer:

- 3 – Sonny Hine (1986, 1997, 1998) and Clyde Troutt (1959, 1960, 1962)

== Winners ==
| Year | Winner | Age | Jockey | Trainer | Owner | Time | Grade |
|---|---|---|---|---|---|---|---|
| 2008 | Commentator | 7 | John Velazquez | Nick Zito | Tracy Farmer | 1:48.97 | NG |
| 2007 | Brass Hat | 6 | Willie Martinez | William B. Bradley | Fred F. Bradley | 1:49.72 | NG |
| 2005 | – 2006 | Race not held | | | | | |
| 2004 | Offlee Wild | 4 | Edgar Prado | Richard E. Dutrow Jr. | AZ Azalea Stables LLC | 1:49.14 | II |
| 2003 | Race not held | | | | | | |
| 2002 | Macho Uno | 4 | Gary Stevens | Joe Orseno | Stronach Stables | 1:50.52 | II |
| 2001 | Include | 4 | Jerry D. Bailey | Bud Delp | Robert E. Meyerhoff | 1:48.60 | II |
| 2000 | Running Stag | 6 | John Velazquez | Philip Mitchell | Richard J. Cohen | 1:49.45 | II |
| 1999 | Behrens | 5 | Jorge Chavez | H. James Bond | Rudlein Stable | 1:49.00 | II |
| 1998 | Skip Away | 5 | Jerry D. Bailey | Sonny Hine | Carolyn Hine | 1:47.27 | III |
| 1997 | Skip Away | 4 | Shane Sellers | Sonny Hine | Carolyn Hine | 1:47.80 | III |
| 1996 | Cigar | 6 | Jerry D. Bailey | William I. Mott | Allen E. Paulson | 1:49.60 | NG |
| 1995 | Cigar | 5 | Jerry D. Bailey | William I. Mott | Allen E. Paulson | 1:48.60 | NG |
| 1990 | – 1994 | Race not held | | | | | |
| 1989 | Private Terms | 4 | Kent Desormeaux | Charles H. Hadry | Locust Hill Farm | 1:49.40 | II |
| 1988 | Lost Code | 4 | Craig Perret | L. William Donovan | Wendover Stable | 1:50.20 | II |
| 1987 | Waquoit | 4 | Chris McCarron | Guido Federico | Joseph Federico | 1:49.00 | II |
| 1986 | Skip Trial | 4 | Jean-Luc Samyn | Sonny Hine | Zelda Cohen | 1:49.80 | II |
| 1985 | Bounding Basque | 5 | Antonio Graell | Woody Sedlacek | Jacques D. Wimpfheimer | 1:47.60 | II |
| 1984 | Dixieland Band | 4 | Declan Murphy | Charles Peoples | Mary Sharp | 1:52.00 | II |
| 1983 | Let Burn | 4 | Jack Penney | William W. Perry | Scorpio Stable | 1:48.80 | II |
| 1982 | Silver Supreme | 4 | Eric Beitia | Richard DeStasio | Michael Berry | 1:48.80 | III |
| 1981 | Soldier Boy | 5 | Roger Danjean | Dominique Imprescia | Sandy Cooperstein | 1:49.40 | III |
| 1980 | Ring of Light | 5 | Frank Lovato Jr. | Pancho Martin | Viola Sommer | 1:50.40 | III |
| 1979 | Island Sultan | 4 | John Ruane | David Hofmans | Buckland Farm | 1:48.60 | II |
| 1978 | Big John Taylor | 4 | Jacinto Vásquez | Doug Peterson | Karen L. Taylor | 1:48.40 | II |
| 1977 | Blue Times | 6 | Ángel Cordero Jr. | Laz Barrera | Aaron U. Jones | 1:49.40 | II |
| 1977 | Swinging Hal | 4 | Steve Pagano | James W. Woods | John Martin | 1:49.20 | II |
| 1976 | Dancing Champ | 4 | Chris McCarron | Bud Delp | Windfields Farm | 1:49.20 | II |
| 1975 | Stonewalk | 4 | Ron Turcotte | Daniel J. Lopez | Timberland Stable | 1:48.60 | II |
| 1974 | Billy Come Lately | 4 | Don MacBeth | John J. Tammaro Jr. | Richard W. Palmer | 1:48.60 | II |
| 1973 | Riva Ridge | 4 | Ron Turcotte | Lucien Laurin | Meadow Stable | 1:48.20 | II |
| 1972 | Droll Role | 4 | Eddie Maple | Thomas J. Kelly | John M. Schiff | 1:49.20 | |
| 1971 | Chompion | 6 | Jorge Velásquez | Ivor G. Balding | C. V. Whitney | 2:34.40 | |
| 1970 | Semillant | 5 | Jean Cruguet | Angel Penna Sr. | Sarah Hall | 2:37.20 | |
| 1969 | Beau Marker | 4 | Leroy Moyers | Lucien Laurin | Reginald N. Webster | 2:04.60 | |
| 1968 | Out Of The Way | 3 | John L. Rotz | Max Hirsch | King Ranch | 2:02.80 | |
| 1967 | Good Knight | 5 | Karl Korte | Arnold Scruton Jr. | Arnold Scruton | 2:02.40 | |
| 1966 | Fast Count | 3 | Mike Venezia | Ivor G. Balding | C. V. Whitney | 2:01.20 | |
| 1965 | Smart | 6 | Eldon Nelson | Henry S. Clark | Christiana Stables | 2:01.60 | |
| 1964 | Smart | 5 | Eldon Nelson | Henry S. Clark | Christiana Stables | 2:03.20 | |
| 1963 | Crimson Satan | 4 | Herberto Hinojosa | Gordon R. Potter | Crimson King Farm | 2:01.20 | |
| 1962 | Air Pilot | 8 | Leroy Moyers | Robert E. Holthus | Horace J. Wise | 2:01.40 | |
| 1961 | Polylad | 5 | Eddie Arcaro | Thomas M. Miles | Mrs. Quentin A. S. McKean | 2:01.80 | |
| 1960 | Talent Show | 5 | Ray Broussard | James P. Conway | Ada L. Rice | 2:03.60 | |
| 1959 | Air Pilot | 5 | Jack Leonard | Clyde Troutt | Ada L. Rice | 2:02.40 | |
| 1958 | Promised Land | 4 | Pete D. Anderson | Hirsch Jacobs | Ethel D. Jacobs | 2:01.80 | |
| 1957 | Greek Spy | 4 | Eric Guerin | Sherrill W. Ward | Charles U. Bay | 2:03.20 | |
| 1956 | Midafternoon | 4 | William Boland | Thomas M. Waller | Mrs. Edward E. Robbins | 2:04.00 | |
| 1955 | Helioscope | 4 | Sam Boulmetis Sr. | Frank Caltrone | William G. Helis Jr. | 2:01.00 | |
| 1954 | Wise Margin | 4 | Keith Stuart | Sam N. Edmundson | Samuel Tufano | 2:01.60 | |
| 1953 | Royal Vale | 5 | Jack Westrope | James E. Ryan | Esther D. du Pont | 2:02.20 | |
| 1952 | To Market | 4 | William Boland | Max Hirsch | King Ranch | 2:01.40 | |
| 1951 | One Hitter | 5 | Ted Atkinson | John M. Gaver Sr. | Greentree Stable | 2:02.20 | |
| 1950 | Cochise | 4 | Eddie Arcaro | Virgil W. Raines | Brandywine Stable | 2:01.80 | |
| 1949 | First Nighter | 4 | Joseph Renick | William J. Hirsch | Sam A. Mason II | 2:04.60 | |
| 1948 | Beauchef | 5 | Ruperto Donoso | Robert B. Odom | Andes Stable | 2:02.60 | |
| 1947 | Stymie | 6 | Conn McCreary | Hirsch Jacobs | Ethel D. Jacobs | 1:50.00 | |
| 1946 | Pavot | 4 | Arnold Kirkland | Oscar White | Walter M. Jeffords | 1:49.80 | |
| 1945 | First Fiddle | 6 | Johnny Longden | Eddie Mulrenan | Mrs. E. Mulrenan | 1:49.40 | |
| 1944 | First Fiddle | 5 | Johnny Longden | Eddie Mulrenan | Mrs. E. Mulrenan | 1:49.00 | |
| 1943 | Market Wise | 5 | Vincenzo Nodarse | George W. Carroll | Louis Tufano | 1:52.00 | |
| 1942 | Whirlaway | 4 | George Woolf | Ben A. Jones | Calumet Farm | 1:48.20 | |
| 1941 | War Relic | 3 | Ted Atkinson | Walter A. Carter | Glen Riddle Farm | 1:48.60 | |
| 1940 | Eight Thirty | 4 | Harry Richards | Bert Mulholland | George D. Widener Jr. | 1:49.00 | |
| 1939 | Fighting Fox | 4 | James Stout | James Fitzsimmons | Belair Stud | 1:52.00 | |
| 1938 | Menow | 3 | Nick Wall | Duval A. Headley | Hal Price Headley | 1:52.60 | |
| 1937 | Seabiscuit | 4 | Red Pollard | Tom Smith | Charles S. Howard | 1:49.00 | |
| 1936 | Time Supply | 5 | Raymond Workman | Carl A. Roles | Mrs. Frank A. Carreaud | 1:49.80 | |
| 1935 | Top Row | 4 | George Woolf | Albert A. Baroni | Albert A. Baroni | 1:49.40 | |

* Day Court finished first in 1959 but was disqualified and placed second.
* Raced in two divisions in 1977.
