= Horatio Luro =

Racehorse trainer

- Horatio Luro with Northern Dancer, shortly before the Blue Grass Stakes

Personal information
- Born: February 27, 1901 Buenos Aires, Argentina
- Died: December 16, 1991 (aged 90) Bal Harbour, Florida
- Occupation: Trainer

Horse racing career
- Sport: Horse racing
- Career wins: 910

Major racing wins
- Jockey Club Gold Cup (1943); Saratoga Cup (1943, 1947); Saratoga Handicap (1943, 1947); Daingerfield Handicap (1946); American Legion Handicap (1947); Black Helen Handicap (1947, 1973, 1980); Santa Anita Handicap (1948); Kentucky Oaks (1951); Canadian International Stakes (1956, 1957, 1971); National Stallion Stakes (1958); Tremont Stakes (1958); Woodbine Oaks (1962, 1965); Blue Grass Stakes (1964); Florida Derby (1964); E. P. Taylor Stakes (1965); Donn Handicap (1979); Widener Handicap (1979) American Classic Race wins: Kentucky Derby (1962, 1964); Preakness Stakes (1964) Canadian Classic Race wins: Queen's Plate (1960, 1962, 1964); Prince of Wales Stakes (1969)

Honors
- National Museum of Racing and Hall of Fame (1980)

Significant horses
- Princequillo, Miss Grillo, Eugenia, Talon, Iceberg II, Spinney, Victoria Park, Flaming Page, Decidedly, Northern Queen, Northern Dancer, One For All, Jumping Hill, Tap Shoes

Horatio A. Luro (February 27, 1901 - December 16, 1991) was an American thoroughbred horse racing trainer.

== Career ==
Luro was born in Argentina as one of nine children into the wealthy family of rancher and meat packer Adolfo Luro. The family had been involved for several generations with the lucrative business of polo horses, and Horatio Luro grew up as something of a playboy and maintained this lifestyle after moving to the United States. Well connected, he was friends with the social and business elite who could afford to be involved in the costly sport of thoroughbred racing. One of those elite was Canada's E. P. Taylor (1901–1989), chairman of a giant business conglomerate, the founder of the Jockey Club of Canada, and later the president of the National Thoroughbred Racing Association. Taylor hired Luro to run his Windfields Farm, a large breeding and racing operation with two farms in Ontario and another in Chesapeake City, Maryland.

In a career that spanned 48 years from 1937 to 1984, Luro trained 43 Stakes winners and 3 Champions. He won the 1962 Kentucky Derby with California-bred Decidedly and two years later won both the Derby and the Preakness Stakes with Northern Dancer, a horse who went on to be the 20th century's greatest sire. Luro also trained three winners of the Canadian International Stakes: Eugenia II (1956), Spinney (1957), and One For All (1971).

While running Windfields Farm, Luro oversaw the breeding of Nijinsky II and from 1960 to 1969 won more races than any other breeding farm in North America. Luro trained three horses that won Canada's most prestigious thoroughbred horse racing event, the Queen's Plate.

Luro basked in the publicity surrounding his racing success, associating with the rich and famous including Hollywood stars such as Bing Crosby while his dashing personality and good looks saw him dating some of society's most glamorous women. In the 1950s, he dated and eventually married the former Frances Weinman Latimer, daughter of Georgia mining and chemical products magnate William Weinman. He subsequently developed a breeding and training facility on her family's land in Cartersville, Georgia, operating under the name "Old Mill Farm". Despite training activities throughout the United States and Canada, it was at this location that he and his wife Frances raised their family. While no longer performing thoroughbred racing operations, Old Mill Farm remains in the hands of Luro's grandson, and an equestrian facility still operates on the site.

In 1980, Luro was inducted into the National Museum of Racing and Hall of Fame. On Sunday, December 16, 1991, Luro died of pancreatic cancer at his home in Bal Harbour, Florida, at the age of 90. He is buried at Oak Hill Cemetery in Cartersville, Georgia.
