= Sonny Hine =

Personal information
- Born: January 9, 1931 The Bronx, New York, U.S.
- Died: March 17, 2000 (aged 69)
- Occupation: Trainer

Horse racing career
- Sport: Horse racing
- Career wins: 1,305

Major racing wins
- Vosburgh Stakes (1981); Arlington Classic (1983); Carter Handicap (1984); Haskell Invitational Handicap (1985, 1992); Ohio Derby (1985, 1996); Pegasus Handicap (1985, 1989); Pennsylvania Derby (1985); Gulfstream Park Handicap (1986, 1987, 1998); Massachusetts Handicap (1986, 1997, 1998); Gardenia Stakes (1991); Florida Derby (1992); Molson Export Million (1996); Suburban Handicap (1997); Donn Handicap (1998); Hollywood Gold Cup (1998); Pimlico Special (1998); Woodward Stakes (1998) Breeders' Cup wins: Breeders' Cup Classic (1997)

Racing awards
- Eclipse Award for Outstanding Owner (1997)

Honors
- National Museum of Racing and Hall of Fame (2003)

Significant horses
- Skip Trial, Technology, Bet Big; Norquestor, Skip Away

Hubert "Sonny" Hine (January 9, 1931 – March 17, 2000) was an American Hall of Fame Thoroughbred horse trainer best known as the trainer of 1998 U.S. Horse of the Year, Skip Away.

== Early life ==
Hine was born in The Bronx, New York, the son of clothing merchant and trainer Arthur Hine. Predating his training career in horse racing, he often rode match races with his brother, Marvin. His training career began after high school when he hitchhiked to Charles Town and trained Miss Economy at Marlboro Race Course.

Before becoming a trainer, Hine joined the United States Air Force and attended Yale University for a year. While enrolled in a pre-veterinary course at Pennsylvania State University, he was contacted by the United States Department of State to become a special investigator in Hong Kong, allowing him to become fluent in Mandarin Chinese.

== Thoroughbred racing career ==
Hine became a full-time trainer in 1957, struggling upward with horses such as Amber Pass, Bet Big, Cojak, Guilty Conscience, Norquestor, Royal Hierarchy, Skip Trial and Technology, securing himself at venues such as Monmouth Park and Meadowlands Racetracks.

With Skip Away, Hine won the 1997 Breeders' Cup Classic at Hollywood Park Racetrack. The horse raced under the name of his wife Carolyn, who received the 1997 Eclipse Award for Outstanding Owner. In 1998, Skip Away logged victories in the Donn Handicap, the Gulfstream Park Handicap, the Pimlico Special, the Massachusetts Handicap, the Hollywood Gold Cup, the Philip H. Iselin Stakes and the Woodward Stakes. He finished the year by winning the Eclipse Award for Horse of the Year.

After a three-year battle with cancer, Hine died on March 17, 2000. In 2003, he was inducted into the U.S. National Museum of Racing and Hall of Fame.
