= Pistols and Roses =

American-bred Thoroughbred racehorse

- Sire: Darn That Alarm
- Grandsire: Jig Time
- Dam: To Be Continued
- Damsire: Princely Pleasure
- Sex: Stallion
- Foaled: 1989
- Country: United States
- Colour: Gray
- Breeder: Happy Alter
- Owner: Willis Family Stables, Inc.
- Trainer: George Gianos
- Record: 44: 10-4-6
- Earnings: $1,680,506

Major wins
- Bahamas Stakes (1992); Everglades Stakes (1992); Flamingo Stakes (1992); Blue Grass Stakes (1992); Donn Handicap (1993, 1994); Ben Ali Stakes (1994)

Pistols and Roses (foaled 1989 in Florida) is an American Thoroughbred racehorse. Bred by Happy Alter, he was sired by Darn That Alarm, whose sire, Jig Time, was a son of U.S. Racing Hall of Fame inductee, Native Dancer. His dam was To Be Continued, a descendant of Nearco through Nasrullah and Bold Ruler.

Trained by George Gianos, as a 3-year-old Pistols and Roses had his first important win en route to a berth in the 1992 Kentucky Derby when he won the Everglades Stakes at Hialeah Park Race Track in Hialeah, Florida. He ran second to Dance Floor in the Fountain of Youth Stakes then earned a third-place finish in the Grade 1 Florida Derby. Sent to Kentucky, at Keeneland Race Course he won the final Derby stepping stone, the important Blue Grass Stakes, then a Grade 2 event. In the Derby he was sent off at odds of more than 13-1, and finished far back in 16th place behind a surprise winner, Lil E. Tee, an even longer-shot at 18-1. Pistols and Roses was withdrawn from the Preakness Stakes after swelling was found in his left front ankle.

Pistols and Roses' loss in the Derby marked the beginning of a seven race losing streak that came to an end when, as a 44-to-1 longshot, he won the Feb. 21, 1993, Donn Handicap, a Grade 1 race at Gulfstream Park in Hallandale Beach, Florida. In 1994, the 5-year-old Pistols and Roses successfully defended his title in the Donn, and also won the Ben Ali Stakes at Keeneland Race Course. His other important results of the season were thirds in both the Widener Handicap and the Stuyvesant Handicap.

Retired to stud duty for the 1996 season, Pistols and Roses' offspring have met with modest success. As at the end of 2007, he stands at W.R. Thoroughbreds, at Duchesne, Utah.
