= Donn Handicap =

Former American Thoroughbred horse race

- Class: Grade I stakes
- Location: Gulfstream Park; Hallandale Beach, Florida, USA
- Inaugurated: 1959
- Final run: 2016
- Race type: Thoroughbred - Flat racing
- Website: www.gulfstreampark.com

Race information
- Distance: 1-1/8 miles (9 furlongs)
- Surface: Turf (1959-1964), Dirt (1965-2016)
- Track: left-handed
- Qualification: Four-year-olds and up
- Weight: Handicap
- Purse: $500,000

The Donn Handicap was an American Thoroughbred horse race run annually from 1959 through 2016 at Gulfstream Park in Hallandale Beach, Florida. A race for horses age four and older, it was contested on turf from inception through 1964 at a distance of a mile and one-half. From 1965 onwards it was raced on dirt at a mile and one-eighth with the exception of 1976 when the distance was set at seven furlongs (7/8 mile).

The race was named after the Donn family, who for many years owned and operated the racetrack.

Three horses have won the race twice. Inaugurated at a distance of a mile and a half on turf, the only horse to ever win the race twice at that distance was One-Eyed-King who did it back-to-back in 1959 and 1960. In 1965, future U.S. Racing Hall of Fame inductee Gun Bow won the first edition at its present distance of one and one-eighth miles on dirt. Under those same race conditions, Pistols and Roses won it back-to-back in 1993 and 1994 as did another Hall of Fame inductee Cigar in the two ensuing years.

A total of three horses that have won the Donn Handicap went on to be named either the Eclipse Award for American Horse of the Year or American Champion Older Male Horse that year: Saint Liam, Skip Away and Cigar. In addition, reigning Horse of the Year Invasor won the Donn in 2007 prior to taking the Dubai World Cup.

The final running of the Donn Handicap took place on February 6, 2016.

From 2017, the Donn Handicap was replaced on the Gulfstream racing calendar by the Pegasus World Cup.

== Records ==
Speed record:

- 1-1/8 miles on dirt: 1:46.40, Jumping Hill (1979)
- 1-1/2 miles on turf: 2:25.80, One-Eyed-King (1959) & Jay Fox (1962)

Most wins by a horse:

- 2 - Cigar (1995, 1996)
- 2 - Pistols and Roses (1993, 1994)
- 2 - One-Eyed-King (1959, 1960)

Most wins by a trainer:

- 5 - Todd Pletcher (2003, 2010, 2013, 2015, 2016)

Most wins by a jockey:

- 6 - Jerry Bailey (1988, 1995, 1996, 1998, 2001, 2004)

Most wins by an owner:

- 2 - Cain Hoy Stable (1959, 1960)
- 2 - Brae Burn Farm (1961, 1962)
- 2 - Due Process Stable (1981, 1983)
- 2 - Allen E. Paulson (1995, 1996)
- 2 - Shadwell Stable (2007, 2009)
- 2 - Willis Family Stable (1993, 1994)
- 2 - Twin Creeks Racing Stable (2013, 2015)

== Winners ==
Year	Winner	Age	Jockey	Trainer	Owner	Dist. (mi.)	Time	Win$	Gr.
2016	Mshawish	6	John Velazquez	Todd A. Pletcher	Al Shaqab Racing	1-1/8	1:47.89	$300,000	G1
2015	Constitution	5	Javier Castellano	Todd A. Pletcher	Twin Creeks Racing Stables LLC (managers: Randy Gullatt & Steve Davison)	1-1/8	1:49.51	$300,000	G1
2014	Lea	5	Joel Rosario	William I. Mott	Claiborne Farm & Adele B. Dilschneider	1-1/8	1:46.86	$300,000	G1
2013	Graydar	4	Edgar Prado	Todd A. Pletcher	Twin Creeks Racing Stables LLC (managers: Randy Gullatt & Steve Davison)	1-1/8	1:48.25	$300,000	G1
2012	Hymn Book	6	John Velazquez	C. R. McGaughey	Stuart S. Janney III	1-1/8	1:49.16	$300,000	G1
2011	Giant Oak	5	Shaun Bridgmohan	Chris M. Block	Virginia H. Tarra Trust	1-1/8	1:48.23	$300,000	G1
2010	Quality Road	4	John Velazquez	Todd A. Pletcher	Edward P. Evans	1-1/8	1:47.49	$300,000	G1
2009	Albertus Maximus	5	Alan Garcia	Kiaran McLaughlin	Shadwell Stable	1-1/8	1:50.96	$300,000	G1
2008	Spring At Last	4	Eibar Coa	Doug O'Neill	J. Paul Reddam & WinStar	1-1/8	1:48.35	$300,000	G1
2007	Invasor	4	Fernando Jara	Kiaran McLaughlin	Shadwell Racing	1-1/8	1:48.43	$300,000	G1
2006	Brass Hat	5	Willie Martinez	William B. Bradley	Fred F. Bradley	1-1/8	1:47.79	$300,000	G1
2005	Saint Liam	5	Edgar Prado	Richard E. Dutrow Jr.	William & Suzanne Warren	1-1/8	1:48.43	$300,000	G1
2004	Medaglia d'Oro	5	Jerry D. Bailey	Robert J. Frankel	Edmund A. Gann	1-1/8	1:47.68	$300,000	G1
2003	Harlan's Holiday	4	John R. Velazquez	Todd A. Pletcher	Starlight Stable LLC (Jack & Laurie Wolf)	1-1/8	1:49.17	$300,000	G1
2002	Mongoose	4	Edgar Prado	H. James Bond	Mary & Gary West	1-1/8	1:49.63	$300,000	G1
2001	Captain Steve	4	Jerry D. Bailey	Bob Baffert	Michael E. Pegram	1-1/8	1:48.95	$300,000	G1
2000	Stephen Got Even	4	Shane Sellers	Nick Zito	Stephen & Tomisue Hilbert	1-1/8	1:48.50	$300,000	G1
1999	Puerto Madero	5	Kent Desormeaux	Richard Mandella	Haras Santa Olga (Eugenio Zegers León)	1-1/8	1:48.34	$300,000	G1
1998	Skip Away	5	Jerry D. Bailey	Sonny Hine	Carolyn Hine	1-1/8	1:50.17	$180,000	G1
1997	Formal Gold	4	Joe Bravo	William W. Perry	John D. Murphy	1-1/8	1:47.49	$180,000	G1
1996	Cigar	6	Jerry D. Bailey	William I. Mott	Allen E. Paulson	1-1/8	1:49.12	$180,000	G1
1995	Cigar	5	Jerry D. Bailey	William I. Mott	Allen E. Paulson	1-1/8	1:49.68	$180,000	G1
1994	Pistols and Roses	5	Heberto Castillo Jr.	George Gianos	Willis Family Stables Inc. (Sheldon Willis)	1-1/8	1:50.67	$180,000	G1
1993	Pistols and Roses	4	Heberto Castillo Jr.	George Gianos	Willis Family Stables Inc. (Sheldon Willis)	1-1/8	1:50.10	$240,000	G1
1992	Sea Cadet	4	Alex Solis	Ron McAnally	Verne H. Winchell	1-1/8	1:48.17	$300,000	G1
1991	Jolie's Halo	4	Robin Platts	Happy Alter	Arthur I. Appleton	1-1/8	1:47.50	$300,000	G1
1990	Primal	5	Earlie Fires	James E. Bracken	Tartan Stable	1-1/8	1:50.00	$120,000	G1
1989	Cryptoclearance	5	José A. Santos	Scotty Schulhofer	Philip Teinowitz	1-1/8	1:48.80	$120,000	G1
1988	Jade Hunter	4	Jerry D. Bailey	Richard J. Lundy	Summa Stable & Allen E. Paulson	1-1/8	1:48.80	$120,000	G1
1987	Little Bold John	5	Mike A. Gonzalez	John J. "Jerry" Robb	Hidden Hill Farm et al.	1-1/8	1:48.80	$96,660	G2
1986	Creme Fraiche	4	Eddie Maple	Woody Stephens	Brushwood Stable (Elizabeth Ranney Moran)	1-1/8	1:51.20	$77,280	G2
1985	Mo Exception	4	Robert Breen	Ken Masters	Kenneth Kleier	1-1/8	1:48.60	$74,280	G2
1984	Play Fellow	4	Pat Day	Harvey L. Vanier	Nancy A. Vanier, Carl Lauer, Robert Victor	1-1/8	1:49.00	$53,955	G2
1983	Deputy Minister	4	Don MacBeth	Reynaldo H. Nobles	Due Process Stable	1-1/8	1:48.60	$60,840	G2
1982	Joanie's Chief	5	Jean-Luc Samyn	Gene Jacobs	M/M Peter Barbarino	1-1/8	1:49.00	$57,330	G2
1981	Hurry Up Blue	4	Carlos Lopez	Reynaldo H. Nobles	Due Process Stable	1-1/8	1:49.00	$51,345	G2
1980	Lot O' Gold	4	Don Brumfield	W. E. "Smiley" Adams	Frederick E. Lehmann	1-1/8	1:48.80	$54,600	G2
1979	Jumping Hill	7	Jeffrey Fell	Horatio Luro	El Peco Ranch (George A. Pope Jr.)	1-1/8	1:46.40	$60,150	G2
1978	Man's Man	4	Robert Woodhouse	Thomas W. Kelley	Glenn S. Bromagen	1-1/16	1:42.20	$39,000	G2
1977	Legion	7	Larry Saumell	Gerald F. Jabalee	Ralph E. Chapman	1-1/8	1:48.80	$37,400	G2
1976	Foolish Pleasure	4	Braulio Baeza	LeRoy Jolley	John L. Greer	7/8	1:21.40	$37,980	G2
1975	Proud And Bold	5	Gene St. Leon	John Zarthar	Robert Van Worp Sr.	1-1/8	1:48.00	$35,280	G2
1974	Forego	4	Heliodoro Gustines	Frank Y. Whiteley Jr.	Lazy F Ranch	1-1/8	1:48.60	$36,000	G3
1973	Triumphant	4	Braulio Baeza	Joseph M. Bollero	Russell L. Reineman	1-1/8	1:47.80	$37,560	G3
1972	Going Straight	4	Mickey Solomone	Elwood McCann	Donamire Farm (Don & Mira Ball)	1-1/8	1:51.20	$37,140	
1971	Judgable	4	Walter Blum	Herbert Nadler	Saul Nadler	1-1/8	1:47.00	$39,120	
1970	Twogundan	4	Earlie Fires	Clyde Troutt	Ada L. Rice	1-1/8	1:51.20	$39,600	
1969	Funny Fellow	4	Braulio Baeza	Edward A. Neloy	Wheatley Stable	1-1/8	1:49.20	$44,200	
1968	Favorable Turn	4	Eddie Belmonte	Eugene Jacobs	Herbert A. Allen Sr.	1-1/8	1:48.20	$45,500	
1967	Francis U.	4	Ronald J. Campbell	Del W. Carroll	Michael G. Phipps	1-1/8	1:50.40	$41,100	
1966	Tronado	6	Balsamino Moreira	Arnold N. Winick	Herbert Herff & Joseph La Croix	1-1/8	1:49.20	$39,550	
1965	Gun Bow	5	Walter Blum	Edward A. Neloy	Gedney Farm (Mrs. John T. Stanley & Harry P. Albert)	1-1/8	1:50.00	$36,650	
1964	Cedar Key	4	Manuel Ycaza	Donald McCoy	Jerry Basta	1-1/2	2:26.00	$39,750	
1963	Tutankhamen	5	Bill Shoemaker	Frank J. McManus	Greentree Stable	1-1/2	2:26.00	$27,835	
1962	Jay Fox	4	Larry Gilligan Jr.	James W. Smith	Brae Burn Farm (James O. McCue)	1-1/2	2:28.40	$26,505	
1961	General Arthur	7	Larry Gilligan Jr.	James W. Smith	Brae Burn Farm (James O. McCue)	1-1/2	2:25.80	$28,395	
1960	One-Eyed-King	6	Manuel Ycaza	Woody Stephens	Cain Hoy Stable	1-1/2	2:27.20	$17,375	
1959	One-Eyed-King	5	Johnny Sellers	Woody Stephens	Cain Hoy Stable	1-1/2	2:25.80	$18,200	

== See also ==
- Donn Handicap "top three finishers" and starters
