= Decidedly =

American-bred Thoroughbred racehorse

- Sire: Determine
- Grandsire: Alibhai
- Dam: Gloire Fille
- Damsire: War Glory
- Sex: Stallion
- Foaled: March 3, 1959
- Country: United States
- Color: Gray
- Breeder: George A. Pope Jr.
- Owner: El Peco Ranch (George A. Pope Jr.)
- Trainer: Horatio Luro
- Rider: Bill Hartack
- Record: 43: 11-9-4
- Earnings: $318,989

Major wins
- Ben Ali Handicap (1963); Dominion Day Handicap (1963); Monmouth Handicap (1963) American Classic Race wins: Kentucky Derby (1962)
- Last updated on September 23, 2008

Decidedly (March 3, 1959 – November 12, 1984) was an American Thoroughbred racehorse who is best known for winning the 1962 Kentucky Derby.

== Background ==
Decidedly was a gray horse bred in California by George Pope. His sire Determine from whom he inherited his gray coat, won the Kentucky Derby in 1954. Decidedly's dam Gloire Fille was descended from the broodmare La France (foaled 1928) who was the female line ancestor of numerous other major winners including Phalanx, Danzig Connection and Johnstown.

== Racing career ==
Ridden by Bill Hartack, Decidedly set a new Churchill Downs track record for 1¼ miles in winning the 1962 Derby. In the second leg and third legs of the U.S. Triple Crown series, the Preakness and Belmont Stakes, he was unplaced.

In 1963 Decidedly won five of thirteen starts and set a new Keeneland Race Course record for 1^{1}/16 miles in winning the Ben Ali Handicap. He was retired from racing at age five after the 1964 season in which he won two races from ten starts.

== Stud record and later life ==
At stud, Decidedly was the sire of nineteen stakes race winners.

Decidedly died on November 12, 1984, of old age. He was buried in an unmarked grave at El Peco Ranch in Madera, California.

== Sire line tree ==
- Decidedly
  - Tinajero
  - Wardlaw
    - Florida Law

== Pedigree ==
Pedigree of Decidedly (USA), grey stallion, 1959
Sire Determine (USA) 1951	Alibhai (GB); 1938	Hyperion	Gainsborough*
Sire Determine (USA) 1951	Alibhai (GB); 1938	Hyperion	Selene
Sire Determine (USA) 1951	Alibhai (GB); 1938	Teresina	Tracery
Sire Determine (USA) 1951	Alibhai (GB); 1938	Teresina	Blue Tit
Sire Determine (USA) 1951	Koubis (USA); 1946	Mahmoud	Blenheim
Sire Determine (USA) 1951	Koubis (USA); 1946	Mahmoud	Mah Mahal*
Sire Determine (USA) 1951	Koubis (USA); 1946	Brown Biscuit	Sir Andrew
Sire Determine (USA) 1951	Koubis (USA); 1946	Brown Biscuit	Swing On
Dam Gloire Fille (USA) 1949	War Glory (USA); 1930	Man o' War	Fair Play
Dam Gloire Fille (USA) 1949	War Glory (USA); 1930	Man o' War	Mahubah
Dam Gloire Fille (USA) 1949	War Glory (USA); 1930	Annette K	Harry of Hereford
Dam Gloire Fille (USA) 1949	War Glory (USA); 1930	Annette K	Bathing Girl
Dam Gloire Fille (USA) 1949	Belle Femme (USA); 1944	Beau Pere	Son-in-Law
Dam Gloire Fille (USA) 1949	Belle Femme (USA); 1944	Beau Pere	Cinna
Dam Gloire Fille (USA) 1949	Belle Femme (USA); 1944	French Vamp	Stimulus
Dam Gloire Fille (USA) 1949	Belle Femme (USA); 1944	French Vamp	La France (Family: 17-b)

* Decidedly is inbred 4S x 5S to the stallion Gainsborough, meaning that he appears fourth generation and fifth generation (via Mah Mahal) on the sire side of his pedigree.
