= Saint Liam =

American-bred Thoroughbred racehorse

- Sire: Saint Ballado
- Grandsire: Halo
- Dam: Quiet Dance
- Damsire: Quiet American
- Sex: Stallion
- Foaled: April 13, 2000
- Country: United States
- Colour: Bay
- Breeder: Edward P. Evans
- Owner: Mr. & Mrs. William K. Warren, Jr.
- Trainer: Richard E. Dutrow, Jr.
- Record: 20: 9-6-1
- Earnings: $4,456,995

Major wins
- Clark Handicap (2004); Donn Handicap (2005); Stephen Foster Handicap (2005); Woodward Stakes (2005); Breeders' Cup Classic (2005)

Awards
- U.S. Champion Older Male Horse (2005); American Horse of the Year (2005)
- Last updated on July 7, 2019

Saint Liam (April 13, 2000 – August 22, 2006) was an American thoroughbred racehorse who was voted 2005 Eclipse Award Horse of the Year honors after winning the Donn Handicap, Stephen Foster, Woodward Stakes and Breeders' Cup Classic. He died in 2006 due to a freak accident, leaving behind a single crop of foals that included Horse of the Year Havre de Grace.

== Background ==
Saint Liam was a bay stallion bred in Kentucky by Edward Evans. He was sired by Saint Ballado, a stakes-winning son of Halo. His dam was Quiet Dance, a graded-stakes placed daughter of Quiet American. Another foal of Quiet Dance, Quiet Giant, subsequently became the dam of 2017 Horse of the Year Gun Runner. The family traces to the Hall of Fame racemare Gallorette.

Saint Liam was sold at the 2001 Fasig-Tipton Yearling sale for $130,000 to William Warren Jr and his wife Suzanne. Warren named the colt after his father. The horse was originally trained by Anthony Reinstedler but was transferred in 2004 to the barn of Richard E. Dutrow, Jr.

Despite generally good conformation, Saint Liam had small feet with thin soles and a thin hoof wall. Dutrow worked closely with veterinarian Steve Allday and farrier Alex Leaf to keep him sound.

== Racing career ==
=== 2003: three-year-old season ===
Saint Liam was unraced as a two-year-old. At age three, he earned three wins in nine starts, with three second-place finishes. He made his first start on February 22, 2003, finishing second in a maiden special weight race at Gulfstream Park. On March 23, he was entered in another maiden race at Gulfstream, going off as the 3-2 favorite in a field of nine. He raced in midpack during the early running then made his move on the final turn, pulling away late to win by half a length.

Saint Liam was then stepped up in class by facing graded stakes company for the first time in the Arkansas Derby on April 12. He never threatened, finishing seventh. Returning to allowance company, he finished second at Churchill Downs on May 25 before winning his next start on June 8 by 9 1/4 lengths. Over the summer, he finished second in the Iowa Derby, then tenth in the National Museum of Racing Hall of Fame Handicap (in his first start on the turf) and sixth in an allowance race at Saratoga.

Saint Liam was then given some time off to recover from chronic problems with his feet. He was transferred to the barn of Rick Dutrow, who worked with farrier Alex Leaf and veterinarian Steve Allday. The colt returned to the races on December 3 at Aqueduct and responded with a four length win.

=== 2004: four-year-old season ===
In his four-year-old season, Saint Liam made five starts and won twice, including the Grade II Clark Handicap. He lost the Grade I Woodward Stakes by a neck to eventual 2004 Horse of the Year Ghostzapper.

Saint Liam started his four-year-old campaign on January 18, 2004, in an allowance optional claiming race at Gulfstream Park. Going off as the 9-10 favorite, he rated behind the early pace and then mounted his drive while swinging wide around the final turn. He won by four lengths.

Saint Liam returned to stakes company in the New Orleans Handicap on February 29, facing Kentucky Derby winner Funny Cide and multiple stakes winner Peace Rules. Peace Rules set the early pace, with Saint Liam two lengths back in second and Funny Cide in third. Saint Liam gradually closed the gap to Peace Rules and the two horses dueled the length of the stretch. Saint Liam briefly took the lead but Peace Rules rallied in the final strides and won by a head. Peace Rules then won the Oaklawn Handicap on April 3, with Saint Liam finishing third after tiring in the stretch.

Saint Liam was then given some time off before returning in the Grade I Woodward Stakes at Belmont Park on September 11. There he faced rising star Ghostzapper, who had won three races in a row. Saint Liam set a "wicked" pace, completing the first half-mile in :45.70 and the mile in 1:33.35. Ghostzapper moved alongside around the turn and was bumped when Saint Liam drifted out. The two battled down the stretch with Ghostzapper prevailing by a neck. The final time of 1:46.38 for 1 1/8 miles was one of the fastest ever in the race, behind only Forego in 1976 and Mineshaft in 2003.

Despite being competitive at the highest level of racing, Saint Liam had still never won a stakes race. He finally did so in his final start of 2004, the Grade II Clark Handicap at Churchill Downs on November 27. Saint Liam was bumped hard at the start by Seek Gold but quickly regained his stride and settled in second place behind a moderate early pace set by Lundy's Liability. He started his drive around the final turn and drew off to win by 1 1/4 lengths over a fast closing Seek Gold.

=== 2005: five-year-old season ===
In 2005, Saint Liam captured four Grade I races, including the Donn Handicap, the Stephen Foster Handicap, and the Woodward Stakes. He was second in the Grade I Whitney Handicap to Commentator. In his last race, jockey Jerry Bailey rode him to victory in the Breeders' Cup Classic, after which he was retired with a record of 9-6-1 in 20 races and career earnings of $4,456,995.

Saint Liam started his five-year-old campaign in the Donn Handicap at Gulfstream Park on February 5. He pressed the early pace set by Roses in May, then took a narrow lead down the backstretch. Around the far turn, he started to open up the lead but lost a considerable amount of ground turning into the stretch when he drifted extremely wide. Once straightened out, he resumed his drive and won by 3 3/4 lengths. The win, his first in a Grade I event, brought his earnings over the $1 million mark.

On March 5, Saint Liam made his next start in the Santa Anita Handicap, going off as the even-money favorite in a field of eleven. He stalked the early pace but weakened in the stretch and finished sixth behind Rock Hard Ten. "I was done on the backside," said jockey Edgar Prado. "He was lugging in a little bit and it just wasn't him. He didn't handle the track very well. He's normally a better horse than that."

In June, Saint Liam's trainer Rick Dutrow was suspended for 60 days for medication violations. During the suspension, Saint Liam was temporarily transferred to the stable of Hall of Famer Bobby Frankel. On June 18, Saint Liam handily won the Stephen Foster Handicap by 2 3/4 lengths. With the retirement of Ghostzapper (who Frankel had also trained), Saint Liam was now widely regarded as the best American horse in training. "This moves him to the head of the class now," said Frankel. "People are congratulating me. Give Dutrow credit. His crew got this horse ready."

Returning to Dutrow's care, Saint Liam made his next start on August 6 in the Whitney Handicap at a distance of 1 1/8 miles. Commentator, best known as a sprinter, set a brisk early pace and opened a 5 1/2-length lead down the backstretch. Around the final turn and down the stretch, Saint Liam gradually narrowed the gap but could not get by, losing by a neck. Saint Liam turned the tables though in the Woodward Stakes on September 10. Ridden for the first time by Jerry Bailey, he rated off the early pace before taking command in the stretch to win by two lengths over Sir Shackleton, with Commentator well back in third.

Saint Liam made his final start on October 29 in the Breeders' Cup Classic. After breaking poorly, he settled into fifth place behind a moderate early pace set by Sun King and Suave. Flower Alley stalked the early leaders then took command rounding the turn. Racing four wide, Saint Liam moved alongside Flower Alley at the top of the stretch and gradually pulled away, winning by a length. Perfect Drift closed late to finish third.

Dutrow was highly emotional after the race. "I can't explain the feeling. He gives me a feeling I've never had before. I owe him everything. He is my boy. I see him every night before I go to bed. And I'm going to miss him so much. Words just can't describe this horse." His owner, William Warren Jr, was also emotional, remembering his father, a self-made millionaire. "Every time this horse races, it's a special remembrance to me."

It was jockey Jerry Bailey's fifteenth win at the Breeders' Cup, then a record. Bailey felt that Saint Liam had cemented Horse of the Year honors with the win, pointing out how much ground Saint Liam had lost at the start due to his outside post position and a poor break that shifted his course even further outside. "He took the worse of it today, and still was very authoritative in winning."

== Stud career ==
Saint Liam was standing at stud at Lane's End Farm in Versailles, Kentucky when, in a freak accident in August 2006 he slipped and fell, suffering an untreatable left tibial fracture. The 6-year-old stallion was humanely euthanized at Rood & Riddle Equine Hospital in Lexington, Kentucky. Before his death he covered a number of mares, 115 of which were in foal and 96 that had foals that went on to race.

On January 11, 2007, his first foal (named Billy's Punch) was born to the Seattle Slew mare Slewzig. Saint Liam's most notable offspring is Havre de Grace (foaled May 12, 2007, out of Easter Brunette by Carson City), who won the 2011 Horse of the Year award while capturing the Azeri, Woodward, Beldame, Apple Blossom H., and Obeah Stakes, and running against males in the Breeders' Cup Classic.

== Campus building named Saint Liam ==
After winning the Breeders' Cup, the Warrens indicated that they planned to donate half of the horses breeding rights to the Saint Francis Health Centre in Oklahoma. In 2007, the Warrens donated $8 million to the University of Notre Dame for the refurbishment of the health center, which was renamed Saint Liam Hall. The Warrens are prominent donors to the University of Notre Dame; the Notre Dame golf course is called the Warren Golf Course. The university stated the building was named in honor of Mr. Warren's father William K. Warren, Sr. (Liam is Irish for William) and his namesake Saint William of York, and makes no mention of the racehorse.

== Race Record ==
=== Statistics ===
Date	Age	Distance	Race	Grade	Track	Odds	Field	Finish	Winning Time	Winning (Losing) Margin	Jockey	Ref
Feb 22, 2003	3	7 furlongs	Maiden Special Weight	Maiden	Gulfstream Park	24.80	11	2	1:23.53	(7 1/2 lengths)	Pat Day	
Mar 28, 2003	3	1 1/16 miles	Maiden Special Weight	Maiden	Gulfstream Park	*1.60	9	1	1:45.68	1/2 length	Jose Santos	
Apr 12, 2003	3	1 1/8 miles	Arkansas Derby	II	Oaklawn Park	73.00	12	7	1:48.39	(14 3/4 lengths)	Jon Court	
May 25, 2003	3	1 1/16 miles	Allowance	Allowance	Churchill Downs	5.00	6	2	1:44.31	(2 3/4 lengths)	Shane Sellers	
Jun 8, 2003	3	1 1/16 miles	Allowance	Allowance	Churchill Downs	*0.60	6	1	1:42.8	9 1/4 lengths	Pat Day	
Jul 5, 2003	3	1 1/16 miles	Iowa Derby	Listed	Prairie Meadows	3.30	6	2	1:40.82	(2 3/4 lengths)	Craig Perret	
Aug 4, 2003	3	1 1/8 miles	National Museum of Racing Hall of Fame Handicap	II	Saratoga	11.90	11	10	1:49.34	(12 1/4 lengths)	Pat Day	
Aug 24, 2003	3	1 1/8 miles	Allowance	Allowance	Saratoga	5.20	9	16	1:48.59	(7 3/4 lengths)	Pat Day	
Dec 12, 2003	3	1 1/16 miles	Allowance	Allowance	Aqueduct	*1.45	9	1	1:43.66	4 lengths	Michael Luzzi	
Jan 18, 2004	4	1 1/16 miles	Allowance Optional Claiming	Allowance Optional Claiming	Gulfstream Park	*0.90	8	1	1:43.18	4 lengths	Edgar Prado	
Feb 29, 2004	4	1 1/8 miles	New Orleans Handicap	II	Fair Grounds	5.60	8	2	1:48.61	(head)	Edgar Prado	
Apr 3, 2004	4	1 1/8 miles	Oaklawn Handicap	II	Oaklawn Park	1.90	6	3	1:48.26	(2 1/4 lengths)	Edgar Prado	
Sep 11, 2004	4	1 1/8 miles	Woodward Stakes	I	Belmont Park	11.70	7	2	1:47.38	(neck)	Edgar Prado	
Nov 26, 2004	4	1 1/8 miles	Clark Handicap	II	Churchill Downs	*1.20	9	1	1:50.81	1 1/4 lengths	Edgar Prado	
Feb 5, 2005	5	1 1/8 miles	Donn Handicap	I	Gulfstream Park	1.80	6	1	1:48.43*	3 3/4 lengths	Edgar Prado	
Mar 5, 2005	5	1 1/4 miles	Santa Anita Handicap	I	Santa Anita Park	*1.10	11	6	2:01.20	(4 lengths)	Edgar Prado	
Jun 18, 2005	5	1 1/8 miles	Stephen Foster Handicap	I	Churchill Downs	*0.90	8	1	1:47.52	1 1/8 lengths	Edgar Prado	
Aug 6, 2005	5	1 1/8 miles	Whitney Handicap	I	Saratoga	*0.70	8	2	1:48.33	(neck)	Edgar Prado	
Sep 10, 2005	5	1 1/8 miles	Woodward Stakes	I	Belmont Park	*0.40	5	1	1:49.07	2 lengths	Jerry Bailey	
Oct 29, 2005	5	1 1/4 miles	Breeders' Cup Classic	I	Belmont Park	*2.40	13	1	2:01.49	1 length	Jerry Bailey	

== Pedigree ==
Pedigree of Saint Liam
Sire Saint Ballado	Halo	Hail To Reason	Turn-to
Sire Saint Ballado	Halo	Hail To Reason	Nothirdchance
Sire Saint Ballado	Halo	Cosmah	Cosmic Bomb
Sire Saint Ballado	Halo	Cosmah	Almahmoud
Sire Saint Ballado	Ballade	Herbager	Vandale
Sire Saint Ballado	Ballade	Herbager	Flagette
Sire Saint Ballado	Ballade	Miss Swapsco	Cohoes
Sire Saint Ballado	Ballade	Miss Swapsco	Soaring
Dam Quiet Dance	Quiet American	Fappiano	Mr. Prospector
Dam Quiet Dance	Quiet American	Fappiano	Killaloe
Dam Quiet Dance	Quiet American	Demure	Dr. Fager
Dam Quiet Dance	Quiet American	Demure	Quiet Charm
Dam Quiet Dance	Misty Dancer	Lyphard	Northern Dancer
Dam Quiet Dance	Misty Dancer	Lyphard	Goofed
Dam Quiet Dance	Misty Dancer	Flight Dancer	Misty Flight
Dam Quiet Dance	Misty Dancer	Flight Dancer	Courbette
