= Skip Away =

American-bred Thoroughbred racehorse

- Skip Away's grave at Old Friends Equine
- Sire: Skip Trial
- Grandsire: Bailjumper
- Dam: Ingot Way
- Damsire: Diplomat Way
- Sex: Stallion
- Foaled: 1993
- Died: 2010
- Country: USA
- Color: Gray
- Breeder: Anna Maria Barnhart
- Owner: Carolyn Hine
- Trainer: Sonny Hine
- Record: 38: 18-10-6
- Earnings: $9,616,360

Major wins
- Blue Grass Stakes (1996); Woodbine Million (1996); Haskell Invitational Handicap (1996); Ohio Derby (1996); Breeders' Cup Classic (1997); Jockey Club Gold Cup (1996, 1997); Massachusetts Handicap (1997, 1998); Pimlico Special (1998); Woodward Stakes (1998); Hollywood Gold Cup (1998); Gulfstream Park Handicap (1998); Donn Handicap (1998)

Awards
- U.S. Champion Three-Year-Old Colt (1996); U.S. Champion Older Male Horse (1997, 1998); United States Horse of the Year (1998)

Honors
- United States Racing Hall of Fame (2004) #32 – Top 100 U.S. Racehorses of the 20th Century; Skip Away Handicap at Gulfstream Park; Skip Away Stakes at Monmouth Park
- Last updated on 22 January 2011

Skip Away (April 4, 1993 – May 14, 2010), was a champion American Thoroughbred racehorse who was the 1998 Horse of the Year, 1996 Champion Three-Year-Old, and 1997 and 1998 Champion Handicap Horse. He won 10 Grade One races for $9,616,360 in prize money.

== Breeding ==
Bred by Anna Marie Barnhart, Skip Away was foaled and reared at Hilmer Schmidt's Indian Hill Farm in Florida. A son of Skip Trial, out of the Diplomat's Way mare Ingot Way, Skip Away was purchased for the modest sum of $30,000 at a two-year-olds in training sale in Ocala, Florida, by Hall of Fame trainer Hubert "Sonny" Hine for his wife. Carolyn Hine had particularly wanted a gray horse because vision problems made it difficult for her to see any other kind on the race track.

== Racing record ==
Skip Away won one of six starts as a two-year-old, placing in the Cowdin and Remsen Stakes at Belmont Park. His first stakes win came as a three-year-old, when he defeated eventual Preakness Stakes winner Louis Quatorze by six lengths in the Blue Grass Stakes while setting a stakes record over a wet-fast track at Keeneland Race Course.

After an unaccountably poor performance in the Kentucky Derby, Skip Away finished second in the Preakness Stakes and Belmont Stakes, losing the latter by a length to Editor's Note after a prolonged duel down the long stretch. He won the 1996 Haskell Invitational Handicap and in October of that year, he defeated Cigar, winner of 17 of his previous 18 races, in the Jockey Club Gold Cup at Belmont Park. Seizing the lead entering the stretch, Skip Away won by a neck over the steadily closing champion.

Formal Gold defeated Skip Away in four of their six meetings in 1997. After Skip Away was soundly defeated as a four-year-old by Formal Gold in the Philip H. Iselin Breeders' Cup Handicap at Monmouth Park and in the Woodward Stakes at Belmont Park, he was given a new rider, Jerry Bailey, who replaced Shane Sellers. With Bailey at the reins, Skip Away adopted a new front-running style and won nine consecutive races, including a six-length victory in the 1997 Breeders' Cup Classic, contested that year at Hollywood Park Racetrack, setting a record time of 1:59:16 under another new rider, Mike Smith.

As a five-year-old, Skip Away won seven consecutive races including five Grade I events, such as the 1998 Pimlico Special, Hollywood Gold Cup, and Woodward Stakes. Although he failed to repeat his Breeders' Cup win at Churchill Downs, he was voted Eclipse Awards as Champion Handicap Horse and Horse of the Year for 1998. He was retired to stud that fall with 18 wins and 34 in-the-money finishes from 38 career starts and earnings of $9,616,360.

== Stud record ==
During his 12 years at stud, Skip Away sired 489 foals. From nine crops of racing age, he had 21 stakes winners, who earned $19,424,552 His more notable offspring include Skipshot (Swaps Stakes), Skip Code (Grey Stakes), and Sister Swank (Valley View Stakes).

At age seventeen, Skip Away died of an apparent heart attack in his paddock on May 14, 2010, at Hopewell Farm in Midway, Kentucky. He is interred at Old Friends Farm in Georgetown, Kentucky.

== Honors ==
Skip Away was inducted into National Museum of Racing and Hall of Fame in 2004. In the Blood-Horse magazine ranking of the top 100 U.S. Thoroughbred champions of the 20th Century, he was ranked No.32.

In 2001, Gulfstream Park Racetrack in Hallandale Beach, Florida honored Skip Away by renaming its Broward Handicap the Skip Away Handicap.

== Pedigree ==
Pedigree of Skip Away
Sire Skip Trial bay 1982	Bailjumper bay 1974	Damascus bay 1964	Sword Dancer
Sire Skip Trial bay 1982	Bailjumper bay 1974	Damascus bay 1964	Kerala
Sire Skip Trial bay 1982	Bailjumper bay 1974	Court Circuit bay 1964	Royal Vale
Sire Skip Trial bay 1982	Bailjumper bay 1974	Court Circuit bay 1964	Cycle
Sire Skip Trial bay 1982	Looks Promising gray 1968	Promised Land gray 1954	Palestinian
Sire Skip Trial bay 1982	Looks Promising gray 1968	Promised Land gray 1954	Mahmoudess
Sire Skip Trial bay 1982	Looks Promising gray 1968	Fluoresee bay 1958	Double Jay
Sire Skip Trial bay 1982	Looks Promising gray 1968	Fluoresee bay 1958	Snow Flame
Dam Ingot Way gray 1981	Diplomat Way bay 1964	Nashua dark bay 1952	Nasrullah
Dam Ingot Way gray 1981	Diplomat Way bay 1964	Nashua dark bay 1952	Segula
Dam Ingot Way gray 1981	Diplomat Way bay 1964	Jandy chestnut 1949	Princequillo
Dam Ingot Way gray 1981	Diplomat Way bay 1964	Jandy chestnut 1949	Centenary
Dam Ingot Way gray 1981	Ingot Way gray 1971	Iron Ruler gray 1965	Never Bend
Dam Ingot Way gray 1981	Ingot Way gray 1971	Iron Ruler gray 1965	Obedient
Dam Ingot Way gray 1981	Ingot Way gray 1971	Glorious Night black 1961	Dark Star
Dam Ingot Way gray 1981	Ingot Way gray 1971	Glorious Night black 1961	Queen Fleet

== See also ==
- List of leading Thoroughbred racehorses
