= Sir Bear =

American Thoroughbred racehorse

- Sire: Sir Leon
- Grandsire: Private Account
- Dam: Spicy Pearl
- Damsire: Bet Big
- Sex: Gelding
- Foaled: 1993
- Country: United States
- Colour: Dark Bay
- Breeder: Dr. Al Smollin
- Owner: Barbara Smollin
- Trainer: Ralph Ziadie
- Record: 71-19-12-14
- Earnings: $2,536,922

Major wins
- Thistledown Handicap (1998); Excelsior Handicap (1998); Skip Away Handicap (1998, 1999, 2002); Cigar Mile Handicap (1998); Metropolitan Handicap (1999); Cornhusker Breeders' Cup Handicap (2000); Texas Mile Stakes (2000); Gulfstream Park Handicap (2001)
- Last updated on August 30, 2007

Sir Bear (foaled 1993 in Florida) is a retired American Thoroughbred racehorse who got better as he grew older and raced successfully until retiring at age ten.

He was bred by Florida veterinarian, Dr. Al Smollin, and raced by his wife, Barbara. He was trained by Jamaica native Ralph Ziadie from a base at Calder Race Course in Miami Gardens.

Sir Bear raced in Florida and also competed at racetracks from Ohio to the East Coast of the United States. A multiple Grade I winner, his victories include the 1998 Cigar Mile Handicap and the 1999 Metropolitan Handicap. In 2002, at age nine, he won his third Skip Away Handicap by defeating Preakness Stakes winner, Red Bullet.

Sir Bear made his last start at age ten on January 25, 2003, in the Sunshine Millions Classic at Gulfstream Park.
