= 2005 in sports =

2005 in sports describes the year's events in world sport.

== Alpine skiing ==
- Alpine Skiing World Cup
  - Men's overall season champion: Bode Miller (US)
  - Women's overall season champion: Anja Pärson (Sweden)

== American football ==
- Super Bowl XXXIX – the New England Patriots (AFC) won 24–21 over the Philadelphia Eagles (NFC)
  - Location: Alltel Stadium
  - Attendance: 78,125
  - MVP: Deion Branch, WR (New England)
- Orange Bowl (2004 season):
  - The Southern California Trojans won 55–19 over the Oklahoma Sooners to win the BCS National Championship

== Association football ==
- May 18 – UEFA Cup final – CSKA Moscow became the first Russian club to win a major European club competition, defeating Sporting Lisbon 3–1 at Sporting's home field in Lisbon.
- May 25 – UEFA Champions League final – Liverpool defeated A.C. Milan 3–2 on penalties after a 3–3 draw in Istanbul to win Europe's top prize for the 5th time.
- August 31 – Boca Juniors (Argentina) won the Recopa Sudamericana 2005 4–3 on aggregate over Once Caldas (Colombia). (First leg in Buenos Aires 3–1, second leg in Manizales 1–2)
- December 11 – Opening game of the first FIFA World Club Championship, a six team tournament replacing the former Intercontinental Cup. In the final one week later Brazilian team São Paulo won the competition narrowly beating UEFA Champions Liverpool 1–0.
- December 18 – Boca Juniors defeated UNAM Pumas on penalties after the second leg game for the Copa Sudamericana 2005.
- December 19 – Ronaldinho (Brazil, for male footballer) and Birgit Prinz (Germany, for female footballer) were elected FIFA World Player of the Year.

== Australian rules football ==
- Australian Football League
  - The Sydney Swans win the 109th AFL Premiership, defeating West Coast Eagles 8.10 (58) to 7.12 (54), the club's first premiership in 72 years
  - Brownlow Medal awarded to Ben Cousins, captain of the West Coast Eagles
  - Leigh Matthews Trophy also awarded to Cousins
  - Coleman Medal awarded to Fraser Gehrig of St Kilda
  - See also Australian Football League season 2005
- 2005 Australian Football International Cup won by New Zealand

== Athletics ==
- June 14 – Men's 100 metres – Asafa Powell of Jamaica sets a new world record of 9.77 at the Athens Olympic Stadium.
- June 19 – European Cup
  - Men's overall standings – Germany
  - Women's overall standings – Russia
- August – World Championships held in Helsinki
- IAAF Golden League – Russian triple jumper Tatyana Lebedeva is the sole winner of the US$1 million jackpot divided among all athletes who win their event at each of six designated meets.
- December 13 – The Court of Arbitration for Sport bans American Tim Montgomery for two years in a case stemming from his involvement with the controversial "sports nutrition" center BALCO. Although Montgomery never tested positive for drugs, CAS found the circumstantial evidence against him overwhelming. It also struck all his results since 2001 from the records, including a then world-record time of 9.78.

== Baseball ==
- October 22 – 2005 Japan Series – The Chiba Lotte Marines sweep the Hanshin Tigers 4 games to 0.
- October 26 – 2005 MLB World Series – The Chicago White Sox sweep the Houston Astros 4 games to 0 to win the World Series for the first time since 1917.

== Basketball ==
- NBA Finals – San Antonio Spurs win their third NBA title in the past seven years, defeating the Detroit Pistons in the first seven-game NBA Finals in eleven years.
- WNBA Finals - Sacramento Monarchs defeat Connecticut Sun to win their only title.
- Men's Division I – North Carolina defeats Illinois, 75–70, in the Championship Game. It is Tar Heels coach Roy Williams's first national title.
- Women's Division I – Baylor defeats Michigan State, 84–62, in the final. It is the first Women's National Title game in several years to not involve either Tennessee or UConn. Baylor coach Kim Mulkey-Robertson becomes the first woman to win NCAA Division I basketball titles as a player and coach.
- Euroleague – Maccabi Tel Aviv successfully defends the Euroleague title, defeating TAU Cerámica of Spain, 90–78, in the final.
- Chinese Basketball Association finals – defending champions Guangdong Southern Tigers defeat the Jiangsu Dragons 3 games to 2 in the best-of-five Chinese Basketball Association finals.
- National Basketball League (Australia) – Sydney Kings defeated the Wollongong Hawks, 3–0, in a best-of-five finals series.
- Bj League, a professional basketball league in Japan, predecessor for B League of Japan, a first game held on November 5.

== Bowling ==
- February 20 – Chris Barnes wins the 62nd US Open
- April 3 – Patrick Allen wins the PBA Denny's World Championship
- April 10 – Steve Jaros wins the PBA Dexter Tournament of Champions
- Patrick Allen is named the Player of the Year for 2004–2005
- November 20 – Mike Scroggins wins the USBC Masters

== Boxing ==
- May 7 – Diego Corrales defeats José Luis Castillo by 10th-round knockout, for the WBO-WBC lightweight title unification. Both men were exchanging a brutal amount of punishment throughout the fight, before a dramatic tenth round in which Corrales scored a TKO after getting knocked down twice. The fight was highly regarded as one of the greatest of all-time and won Ring Magazine fight of the year.
- July 16 – Jermain Taylor, 2000 US Olympic Boxing bronze medalist, defeats Bernard Hopkins for the undisputed Middleweight Title ending Hopkins' 10 year title reign. Hopkins made 20 successful title defenses before losing to Taylor, the current record in the middleweight division, Carlos Monzón is second with 14 successful defenses.
- 13 to November 20 – World Amateur Boxing Championships held in Mianyang, People's Republic of China

== Canadian football ==
- November 27 – the Edmonton Eskimos win the 93rd Grey Cup game, defeating the Montreal Alouettes 38–35 at BC Place Stadium in Vancouver.

== Cricket ==
- January 10 – ICC World XI (344 for 8) beat the ACC Asian XI (232) by 112 runs to win the first of two scheduled one-day internationals for the World Cricket Tsunami Appeal; the second was never played. It is the first time an ODI has been played that has not been between two cricketing nations.
- January 10 – Bangladesh beat Zimbabwe by 226 runs to record their first ever Test match victory.
- July 2 – England and Australia tie the deciding NatWest Series trophy match at Lord's Cricket Ground.
- August 11 – Shane Warne becomes the first bowler to take 600 Test wickets.
- September 12 – England win The Ashes.

== Cycling ==
Road bicycle racing

- Giro d'Italia – Maglia rosa (Overall winner): Paolo Savoldelli (Italy, Discovery Channel Team)
- Tour de France won by Lance Armstrong, his record-setting seventh consecutive title.

Cyclo-cross

- UCI Cyclo-cross World Championships
  - Men's Competition – Sven Nys
  - Women's Competition – Hanka Kupfernagel

== Field hockey ==
- Men's Champions Trophy: Australia
- Men's Champions Challenge: Argentina
- Women's Champions Trophy: Netherlands
- Women's Champions Challenge: New Zealand

== Figure skating ==
- World Figure Skating Championships
  - Men's champion: Stéphane Lambiel, Switzerland
  - Ladies' champion: Irina Slutskaya, Russia
  - Pair skating champions: Tatiana Totmianina and Maxim Marinin, Russia
  - Ice dancing champions: Tatiana Navka and Roman Kostomarov, Russia

== Floorball ==
- Women's World Floorball Championships
  - Champion: Switzerland
- Men's under-19 World Floorball Championships
  - Champion: Sweden
- European Cup
  - Men's champion: SV Wiler-Ersigen
  - Women's champion: RA Rychenberg

== Gaelic Athletic Association ==
- April 16 – The annual congress of the Gaelic Athletic Association votes to open up Croke Park and allow soccer and rugby to be played there under certain circumstances. It is expected that this will pave the way for the Republic of Ireland national football team and the Irish national rugby union team to use Croke Park during the redevelopment of their home ground, Lansdowne Road.
- Camogie
  - All-Ireland Camogie Champion: Cork
  - National Camogie League: Galway
- Gaelic football
  - All-Ireland Senior Football Championship – Tyrone 1–16 died Kerry 2–10
  - National Football League – Armagh 1–21 died Wexford 1–14
  - Tommy Murphy Cup – Tipperary 3–10 died Wexford 0–15
- Ladies' Gaelic football
  - All-Ireland Senior Football Champion: Cork
  - National Football League: Cork
- Hurling
  - All-Ireland Senior Hurling Championship – Cork 1–21 died Galway 1–16
  - Liam MacCarthy Cup – Cork
  - Christy Ring Cup – Westmeath 1–23 died Down 2–18
  - Nicky Rackard Cup – London 5–8 died Louth 1–5
  - National Hurling League – Kilkenny beat Clare

== Gliding ==
- World Gliding Championships (Women's), Klix, Germany
  - 15-metre Class Winner: Mette Pedersen, Denmark; Glider: Alexander Schleicher ASW 27B
  - Standard Class Winner: Jana Veprekova, Czech Republic; Glider: Rolladen-Schneider LS8-b
  - Club Class Winner: Hana Vokrinkova, Czech Republic; Glider: Schempp-Hirth Standard Cirrus
- World Gliding Championships (Junior), Husbands Bosworth, United Kingdom
  - Standard Class Winner: Mark Parker, Great Britain; Glider: Rolladen-Schneider LS8
  - Club Class Winner: Christoph Nacke, Germany; Glider: Rolladen-Schneider LS1

== Golf ==
Men's professional

- Major Championships
  - Masters Tournament – Tiger Woods defeated fellow American Chris DiMarco at the first playoff hole to claim his 4th Masters title and his 9th major.
  - U.S. Open – Michael Campbell
  - British Open – Tiger Woods
  - PGA Championship – Phil Mickelson
- PGA Tour money leader – Tiger Woods won $10,628,024

Men's amateur

- British Amateur – Brian McElhinney
- U.S. Amateur – Edoardo Molinari
- European Amateur – Marius Thorp

Women's professional

- Kraft Nabisco Championship – Annika Sörenstam won her eighth major
- LPGA Championship – Annika Sörenstam
- U.S. Women's Open – Birdie Kim earned what became her only LPGA Tour win.
- Women's British Open – Jeong Jang
- LPGA Tour money leader – Annika Sörenstam won $2,588,240

== Handball ==
- 2005 World Men's Handball Championship: Spain
- 2005 World Women's Handball Championship: Russia

== Horse racing ==
Steeplechases

- Cheltenham Gold Cup – Kicking King
- Grand National – Hedgehunter

Flat races

- Australia – Melbourne Cup won by Makybe Diva for the third time in succession
- Canada – Queen's Plate won by Wild Desert
- Dubai – Dubai World Cup won by Roses in May
- France – Prix de l'Arc de Triomphe won by Hurricane Run
- Ireland – Irish Derby Stakes won by Hurricane Run
- Japan
  - Deep Impact won the Satsuki Sho (Japanese 2,000 Guineas), Tokyo Yushun (Japanese Derby), and Kikuka Sho (Japanese St. Leger) to become the first horse since 1994 to win the Japanese Triple Crown.
  - Japan Cup won by Alkaased
- English Triple Crown Races:
  1. 2,000 Guineas Stakes – Footstepsinthesand
  2. The Derby – Motivator
  3. St. Leger Stakes – Scorpion
- United States Triple Crown Races:
  1. Kentucky Derby – Giacomo
  2. Preakness Stakes – Afleet Alex
  3. Belmont Stakes – Afleet Alex
- Breeders' Cup World Thoroughbred Championships:
  1. Breeders' Cup Classic – Saint Liam
  2. Breeders' Cup Distaff – Pleasant Home
  3. Breeders' Cup Filly & Mare Turf – Intercontinental
  4. Breeders' Cup Juvenile – Stevie Wonderboy
  5. Breeders' Cup Juvenile Fillies – Folklore
  6. Breeders' Cup Mile – Artie Schiller
  7. Breeders' Cup Sprint – Silver Train
  8. Breeders' Cup Turf – Shirocco

== Ice hockey ==
- February 16 – the 2004–05 NHL season was canceled by league commissioner Gary Bettman. This was the first time that a North American professional sports league had to cancel a season due to a labor dispute.
- May 29 – Memorial Cup – London Knights defeat Rimouski Océanic 4–0 to win the Memorial Cup.
- June 1 – Kelly Cup – Trenton Titans defeat Florida Everblades 4 games to 2 to win the Kelly Cup.
- June 10 – Calder Cup – Philadelphia Phantoms defeat Chicago Wolves 4 games to 0 to win the Calder Cup.
- The Philadelphia Flyers top two minor league affiliates, the ECHL Trenton Titans and the AHL Philadelphia Phantoms, both win their respective championship series.
- July 22 – the 2004–05 NHL lockout ends when a new collective bargaining agreement between the NHL and NHLPA is reached.

== Lacrosse ==
Major League Lacrosse (USA)

- Baltimore Bayhawks defeated Long Island Lizards 15–9 to win the Steinfeld Cup.
- MLL announces four expansion teams to start play in the 2006 season and create a Western Conference: Chicago, Denver, Los Angeles and San Francisco.

National Lacrosse League

- The Toronto Rock defeat the Arizona Sting to win the Champion's Cup.
- Les Bartley, former coach and GM of the Toronto Rock, dies later that week.
- Gary Gait, of the Colorado Mammoth, retires along with his twin brother Paul Gait ending an era of lacrosse.

NCAA Division I (US Collegiate)

- Johns Hopkins University obtains the No. 1 seed in the post-season tournament, and wins the NCAA Men's Lacrosse Championship in Philadelphia on May 30 to go unbeaten.
- Northwestern University wins their first Division I NCAA Women's Lacrosse Championship.

European lacrosse

- November 10 – Austrian Lacrosse Association (ÖLAXV) is founded.

== Mixed martial arts ==
The following is a list of major noteworthy MMA events during 2005 in chronological order.

Date	Event	Alternate Name/s	Location	Attendance	PPV Buyrate	Notes
February 5	UFC 51: Super Saturday	—N/a	(United States) Las Vegas, Nevada, USA	11,072	105,000	This event was originally going to be held in Japan. However was moved it back to Las Vegas.
February 20	Pride 29: Fists of Fire	—N/a	Saitama, Japan	22,047	—N/a	—N/a
March 26	K-1 Hero's 1	—N/a	Saitama, Japan	—N/a	—N/a	K-1 Hero's first event.
April 3	Pride Bushido 6	—N/a	Yokohama, Japan	—N/a	—N/a	—N/a
April 9	The Ultimate Fighter 1 Finale	—N/a	(United States) Las Vegas, Nevada, USA	—N/a	—N/a	This event is credited for saving the UFC from bankruptcy and launching the MMA into the mainstream American media.
April 16	UFC 52: Couture vs. Liddell 2	—N/a	(United States) Las Vegas, Nevada, USA	14,562	280,000	Dan "The Beast" Severn was inducted into the UFC Hall of Fame at this event.
April 23	Pride Total Elimination 2005	—N/a	Osaka, Japan	45,423	—N/a	Opening round to Pride GP 2005 middleweight tournament.
May 7	Rumble on the Rock 7	—N/a	(United States) Honolulu, Hawaii, USA	—N/a	—N/a	—N/a
May 22	Pride Bushido 7	—N/a	Tokyo, Japan	—N/a	—N/a	—N/a
June 4	UFC 53: Heavy Hitters	—N/a	(United States) Atlantic City, New Jersey, USA	12,000	90,000	This event was originally going to be held in Yokohama. However the lack of a sponsorship for the event moved it to Atlantic City.
June 26	Pride Critical Countdown 2005	—N/a	Saitama, Japan	—N/a	—N/a	Quarterfinals to Pride GP 2005 middleweight tournament.
July 6	K-1 Hero's 2	—N/a	Tokyo, Japan	—N/a	—N/a	—N/a
July 17	Pride Bushido 8	—N/a	Nagoya, Japan	—N/a	—N/a	—N/a
July 29	K-1 World Grand Prix 2005 in Hawaii	—N/a	(United States) Honolulu, Hawaii, USA	—N/a	—N/a	Event featured ten K-1 kickboxing bouts and four K-1 MMA bouts.
August 6	UFC Ultimate Fight Night	Ultimate Fight Night	(United States) Las Vegas, Nevada, USA	—N/a	—N/a	—N/a
August 20	UFC 54: Boiling Point	—N/a	(United States) Las Vegas, Nevada, USA	13,520	150,000	—N/a
August 28	Pride Final Conflict 2005	—N/a	Saitama, Japan	—N/a	—N/a	Semifinals and final to Pride GP 2005 middleweight tournament. Maurício Rua becomes the Pride 2005 middleweight Grand Prix champion.
September 7	K-1 Hero's 3	—N/a	Tokyo, Japan	—N/a	—N/a	—N/a
September 25	Pride Bushido 9	—N/a	Tokyo, Japan	10,775	—N/a	Quarterfinals and semifinals to Pride GP 2005 lightweight and welterweight tournaments.
October 3	UFC Ultimate Fight Night 2	Ultimate Fight Night 2	(United States) Las Vegas, Nevada, USA	—N/a	—N/a	This event was aired at the same time WWE was on, in a ratings battle.
October 3	UFC 55: Fury	—N/a	(United States) Uncasville, Connecticut, USA	8,000	125,000	—N/a
October 3	Pride 30: Starting Over	Pride 30: Fully Loaded	Saitama, Japan	—N/a	—N/a	—N/a
November 5	The Ultimate Fighter 2 Finale	—N/a	(United States) Las Vegas, Nevada, USA	—N/a	—N/a	—N/a
November 5	K-1 Seoul Hero's	—N/a	Seoul, South Korea	—N/a	—N/a	—N/a
November 19	UFC 56: Full Force	—N/a	(United States) Las Vegas, Nevada, USA	12,000	200,000	—N/a
November 26	K-1 Hero's Lithuania 2005	—N/a	Vilnius, Lithuania	—N/a	—N/a	—N/a
December 3	Cage Rage 14: Punishment	—N/a	London, England	—N/a	—N/a	—N/a
December 3	Pride Shockwave 2005	—N/a	Saitama, Japan	49,801	—N/a	Finals to Pride GP 2005 lightweight and welterweight tournaments. Takanori Gomi becomes the Pride 2005 lightweight Grand Prix champion. Dan Henderson becomes the Pride 2005 welterweight Grand Prix champion.
December 3	K-1 PREMIUM 2005 Dynamite!!	—N/a	Osaka, Japan	53,025	—N/a	Event featured seven K-1 Hero's MMA bouts and four K-1 kickboxing bouts.

== Radiosport ==
- 6th High Speed Telegraphy World Championship held in Ohrid, Republic of Macedonia.

== Rugby league ==
- February 4 at Elland Road, Leeds – 2005 World Club Challenge match is won by the Leeds Rhinos who defeated the Bulldogs 39–32 before 37,208
- April 22 at Suncorp Stadium, Brisbane – in the 2005 ANZAC Day Test, Australia defeat New Zealand 32–16 before 40,317
- July 5 at Suncorp Stadium, Brisbane – 2005 State of Origin is won by New South Wales in the third and deciding match of the series against Queensland before 52,436
- August 27 at Millennium Stadium, Cardiff – 2005 Challenge Cup tournament won by Hull F.C. with a 25–24 win over Leeds Rhinos before 74,213
- October 2 at Telstra Stadium, Sydney – 2005 NRL season culminates in the Wests Tigers 30–16 win over the North Queensland Cowboys in the Grand Final before 82,453
- October 15 at Old Trafford, Manchester – Super League X culminates in Bradford Bulls 15–6 win over Leeds Rhinos in the Grand Final before 65,728
- November 26 at Elland Road, Leeds – 2005 Rugby League Tri-Nations tournament culminates in New Zealand's 24–0 win over Australia in the final before 26,534

== Rugby union ==
- 110th Six Nations Championship series is won by Wales who complete the Grand Slam
- 2005 British & Irish Lions tour to New Zealand – The Lions suffer a 3–0 whitewash to New Zealand, as well as losing to the New Zealand Māori side. It was the first time in 22 years that a Lions side had lost every Test match on tour.
- Tri Nations – New Zealand wins for the 6th time. The All Blacks also picked up the Bledisloe Cup in the process.
- Heineken Cup – Toulouse defeat Stade Français Paris 18–12 in the final.
- Super 12 – The Crusaders defeat the Waratahs 35–25 in the final
- Zurich Premiership (England) – Leicester Tigers win the league, Wasps win the playoffs
- Celtic League – Ospreys
- Top 16 (France) – Biarritz defeat Stade Français Paris 37–34 in the final
- National Provincial Championship (New Zealand): Auckland defeat Otago 39–11 in the final
- Currie Cup (South Africa) – Cheetahs defeat Blue Bulls 29–25 in the final
- In the November Tests, the All Blacks (New Zealand) score a "Grand Slam" by defeating all four Home Nations (Wales, Ireland, England, Scotland) while on tour. This is the first such Grand Slam for a Southern Hemisphere team since Australia did so in 1984, and the first for the All Blacks since 1978.

== Snooker ==
- World Championship – Shaun Murphy beats Matthew Stevens 18–16

== Sumo ==
- Asashōryū Akinori wins all six basho (tournament) in 2005 (a new record) and wins eighty-four bouts (out of ninety) setting a new record for victories in a single year. His seventh straight basho championship is also a new record.

== Swimming ==
- 11th World LC Championships held in Montreal
- 23rd Summer Universiade held in İzmir, Turkey
- 9th European SC Championships held in Trieste, Italy
  - Germany wins the most medals (13); Germany and Poland win the most gold medals (5)

== Taekwondo ==
- World Championships held in Madrid, Spain

== Tennis ==
- Australian Open
  - Men's Final: Marat Safin defeats Lleyton Hewitt
  - Women's Final: Serena Williams defeats Lindsay Davenport
- French Open
  - Men's Final: Rafael Nadal defeats Mariano Puerta
  - Women's Final: Justine Henin-Hardenne defeats Mary Pierce
- Wimbledon Championships
  - Men's Final: Roger Federer defeats Andy Roddick
  - Ladies' Final: Venus Williams defeats Lindsay Davenport
- US Open
  - Men's Final: Roger Federer defeats Andre Agassi
  - Women's Final: Kim Clijsters defeats Mary Pierce

== Triathlon ==
- ITU World Championships held in Gamagōri, Japan

== Volleyball ==
- Men's World League: Brazil
- Women's World Grand Prix: Brazil

== Water polo ==
- 2005 FINA Men's World Water Polo Championship: Yugoslavia
- 2005 FINA Men's Water Polo World League: Yugoslavia
- 2005 FINA Women's World Water Polo Championship: Hungary
- 2005 FINA Women's Water Polo World League: Greece

== Weightlifting ==
- World Championships held in Doha, Qatar
- European Championships held in Sofia, Bulgaria

== Multi-sport events ==
- Fourth East Asian Games held in Macau, China
- 20th Summer Deaflympics held in Melbourne, Australia
- 23rd Southeast Asian Games held in Manila, Philippines
- First Asian Indoor Games held in Bangkok, Thailand
- Seventh World Games held in Duisburg, Germany
- 15th Mediterranean Games held in Almería, Spain
- XXIII Summer Universiade held in İzmir, Turkey
  - Russia tops the medal table with a total number of 65 medals, including 26 golds.
- XXII Winter Universiade held in Innsbruck, Austria
  - Austria tops the medal table with a total number of 21 medals, including 10 golds.

== Awards ==
- Associated Press Male Athlete of the Year – Lance Armstrong, Cycling
- Associated Press Female Athlete of the Year – Annika Sörenstam, LPGA golf
