= Sir Winston (horse) =

Horse

- Sire: Awesome Again
- Grandsire: Deputy Minister
- Dam: La Gran Bailadora
- Damsire: Afleet Alex
- Sex: Colt
- Foaled: April 8, 2016
- Country: United States
- Colour: Chestnut
- Breeder: Tracy Farmer
- Owner: Tracy Farmer
- Trainer: Mark E. Casse
- Record: 19: 6-4-1
- Earnings: $1,189,873

Major wins
- Display Stakes (2018); Valedictory Stakes (2021) American Triple Crown wins: Belmont Stakes (2019)

Sir Winston (foaled April 8, 2016) is an American Thoroughbred racehorse who won the 2019 Belmont Stakes.

== Background ==
Sir Winston is a chestnut colt who was bred in Kentucky by Tracy Farmer. He was offered for sale at the 2017 Keeneland Yearling Sales but the top bid of $50,000 did not meet his reserve, and thus races as a homebred for Farmer. He is trained by Mark Casse.

Sir Winston was sired by Awesome Again, who won the Queen's Plate and Breeders' Cup Classic during his racing career. His leading runners include Ghostzapper, Oxbow, Game On Dude, Ginger Punch, and Paynter. Sir Winston's dam, La Gran Bailadora, is a stakes-winning daughter of Afleet Alex, who won the Preakness and Belmont in 2005.

== Racing career ==
=== 2018: two-year-old season ===
Sir Winston made his first start on June 14, 2018, in a maiden special weight race at Churchill Downs. He broke slowly and was "done early" according to the official chart, finishing sixth. He finished ninth in his next start, on July 21 at Saratoga, before recording his first win on September 12 at Woodbine, a dead heat with Inclusive.

Sir Winston made his graded stakes debut in the Grey Stakes at Woodbine on October 21. He settled a few lengths behind the early pacemakers then started his move on the far turn, racing five wide. He closed ground "gamely" and finished third. He made his final start of the year on December 8 in the listed Display Stakes at Woodbine. He stalked the early pace, then moved to the lead as the field turned into the homestretch. He held off a late run from Inclusive to win by a length.

=== 2019: three-year-old season ===
Sir Winston started his three-year-old season as a "mystery horse" for Casse, who noted the colt's wins at age two had come over a synthetic surface at Woodbine. "We're not really sure how we'll run on the dirt," Casse said. To test the colt, he entered him in the Withers Stakes at Aqueduct on February 2, 2019. Sir Winston broke slowly and trailed the field early before closing well down the stretch to finish fourth. He then finished fifth in the Tampa Bay Derby on March 9. In a last attempt to qualify on the 2019 Road to the Kentucky Derby, Sir Winston was entered in the Blue Grass Stakes at Keeneland on April 4. He was bumped at the start and settled near the back of the field, then was bothered again with 5/16ths of a mile remaining. He raced very wide around the final turn but passed tiring horses to finish seventh, though well beaten by Vekoma.

Not qualifying for the Kentucky Derby, Sir Winston entered the Peter Pan Stakes at Belmont Park on May 11 instead. He again broke slowly and trailed the field early, still 10 lengths back with only 3/8ths of a mile remaining. He circled six-wide around the final turn, then closed steadily down the stretch to finish second, beaten only 1 1/4 lengths by Global Campaign. "[Sir Winston] doesn't have a whole lot of speed," said Casse, "and he's kind of at the mercy of everyone else in the race, but he'll run all day." Sir Winston earned a Beyer Speed Figure of 100 for the race.

On June 7, a field of ten entered the 2019 Belmont Stakes. The favorites were Tacitus (2–1) and War of Will (7–2), the latter the winner of the Preakness Stakes and a stablemate of Sir Winston. Despite being winless at age three, Sir Winston went off at odds of 10-1 based on his performance in the Peter Pan. Ridden for the first time by Joel Rosario, Sir Winston broke slowly from post position 7 and moved over to the rail to save ground around the first turn. Racing a bit closer to the pace than in most of his previous races, he started his move with a half mile remaining, still maintaining good position near the rail. With a quarter mile remaining though, his progress was blocked by the early leaders. Rosario spotted a small hole to the outside and maneuvered the colt sharply away from the rail. Sir Winston accelerated and got through the hole just ahead of War of Will. With room to run, Sir Winston drew clear of the field then held off a late run from Tacitus to win by a length.

It was the first Belmont Stakes win for Casse, who noted that Sir Winston had not been highly regarded as a two-year-old. "If at this time last year, if you had asked me to rate our top-20 2-year-olds, he would have been about 16th or 17th," said Casse. "But I'm very proud of him because he's kind of what our operation represents, and that is I feel like we develop horses... I will try different surfaces; I will try different methods. With a horse like Sir Winston, you know, it paid off there."

== Pedigree ==
Pedigree of Sir Winston, chestnut colt, April 8, 2016
Sire Awesome Again (CAN) 1994	Deputy Minister (CAN); 1979	Vice Regent	Northern Dancer
Sire Awesome Again (CAN) 1994	Deputy Minister (CAN); 1979	Vice Regent	Victoria Regina
Sire Awesome Again (CAN) 1994	Deputy Minister (CAN); 1979	Mint Copy	Bunty's Flight
Sire Awesome Again (CAN) 1994	Deputy Minister (CAN); 1979	Mint Copy	Shakney
Sire Awesome Again (CAN) 1994	Primal Force; 1987	Blushing Groom	Red God
Sire Awesome Again (CAN) 1994	Primal Force; 1987	Blushing Groom	Runaway Bride
Sire Awesome Again (CAN) 1994	Primal Force; 1987	Prime Prospect	Mr. Prospector
Sire Awesome Again (CAN) 1994	Primal Force; 1987	Prime Prospect	Square Generation
Dam La Gran Bailadora 2007	Afleet Alex; 2002	Northern Afleet	Afleet
Dam La Gran Bailadora 2007	Afleet Alex; 2002	Northern Afleet	Nuryette
Dam La Gran Bailadora 2007	Afleet Alex; 2002	Maggy Hawk	Hawkster
Dam La Gran Bailadora 2007	Afleet Alex; 2002	Maggy Hawk	Qualique
Dam La Gran Bailadora 2007	Affirmed Dancer; 1999	Affirmed	Exclusive Native
Dam La Gran Bailadora 2007	Affirmed Dancer; 1999	Affirmed	Won't Tell You
Dam La Gran Bailadora 2007	Affirmed Dancer; 1999	Woolloomooloo	Regal Intention
Dam La Gran Bailadora 2007	Affirmed Dancer; 1999	Woolloomooloo	Tintaburra (family: 1-n)

== See also ==
- List of racehorses
