= Closing Argument (horse) =

American-bred Thoroughbred racehorse

- Sire: Successful Appeal
- Grandsire: Valid Appeal
- Dam: Mrs. Greeley
- Damsire: Mr. Greeley
- Sex: Stallion
- Foaled: 2002
- Country: United States
- Colour: Bay
- Breeder: France & Irwin J. Weiner
- Owner: Philip & Marcia Cohen
- Trainer: Kiaran McLaughlin
- Record: 9: 3-3-2
- Earnings: US$986,984

Major wins
- Holy Bull Stakes (2005) American Classic Race placing: Kentucky Derby 2nd (2005)

Closing Argument (born April 4, 2002, in Florida) is a retired Thoroughbred racehorse. The son of Successful Appeal won the 2005 Holy Bull Stakes and finished third in the Blue Grass Stakes before competing in the Kentucky Derby.

== Triple Crown races ==
On May 7, 2005, trainer Kiaran McLaughlin ran Closing Argument in the 2005 Kentucky Derby. With jockey Cornelio Velásquez aboard, the colt went off as the longest shot on the board at 72:1 odds. He broke from post 18 and bobbled while drifting out but moved up to sixth right behind the leaders as they passed the grandstand for the first time. Around the first turn, he was pushed out nine wide. Down the backstretch and going into the final turn, he inched up to fourth, making his way closer to the rail. Around that turn, he was in the four path and sprinted into first at the top of the stretch. One hundred yards from the wire, Giacamo closed to beat Closing Argument by a half length. It was less than another half length back to eventual Eclipse Award Champion Afleet Alex in third.

In the second leg of the Triple Crown, Closing Argument was fourth choice in a field of 14 at odds of 7:1. In the 2005 Preakness Stakes at Pimlico Race Course, he chased the pace just off the leaders as he did in the Derby in fifth. But at the seven furlong mark, he faded from contention and finished ninth behind Afleet Alex and seven others. Closing Argument did not race in the 2005 Belmont Stakes.

He was retired for 2006 with a record of 3-3-2 in nine career starts and earnings of $986,984. Closing Argument stood at stud at Sequel Stallion in Ocala, Florida, until 2008, when he was moved to Hill 'n' Dale Farms in Lexington, Kentucky.

== Pedigree ==
Pedigree of Closing Argument (USA), bay stallion, 2002
Sire Successful Appeal (USA) dkb/br. 1996	Valid Appeal (USA); 1972	In Reality (USA)	Intentionally (USA)
Sire Successful Appeal (USA) dkb/br. 1996	Valid Appeal (USA); 1972	In Reality (USA)	My Dear Girl (USA)
Sire Successful Appeal (USA) dkb/br. 1996	Valid Appeal (USA); 1972	Desert Trial (USA)	Moslem Chief (USA)
Sire Successful Appeal (USA) dkb/br. 1996	Valid Appeal (USA); 1972	Desert Trial (USA)	Scotch Verdict (USA)
Sire Successful Appeal (USA) dkb/br. 1996	Successful Dancer (USA); 1989	Fortunate Prospect (USA)	Northern Prospect (USA)
Sire Successful Appeal (USA) dkb/br. 1996	Successful Dancer (USA); 1989	Fortunate Prospect (USA)	Fortunate Bid (USA)
Sire Successful Appeal (USA) dkb/br. 1996	Successful Dancer (USA); 1989	Debonair Dancer (USA)	Staff Writer (USA)
Sire Successful Appeal (USA) dkb/br. 1996	Successful Dancer (USA); 1989	Debonair Dancer (USA)	In the Bag (USA)
Dam Mrs. Greeley (USA) ch. 1997	Mr. Greeley (USA); 1992	Gone West (USA)	Mr. Prospector (USA)
Dam Mrs. Greeley (USA) ch. 1997	Mr. Greeley (USA); 1992	Gone West (USA)	Secrettame (USA)
Dam Mrs. Greeley (USA) ch. 1997	Mr. Greeley (USA); 1992	Long Legend (USA)	Reviewer (USA)
Dam Mrs. Greeley (USA) ch. 1997	Mr. Greeley (USA); 1992	Long Legend (USA)	Lianga (USA)
Dam Mrs. Greeley (USA) ch. 1997	Rare Review (USA); 1991	Groovy (USA)	Norcliffe (CAN)
Dam Mrs. Greeley (USA) ch. 1997	Rare Review (USA); 1991	Groovy (USA)	Tinnitus (USA)
Dam Mrs. Greeley (USA) ch. 1997	Rare Review (USA); 1991	Royal Tantrum (USA)	Cornish Prince (USA)
Dam Mrs. Greeley (USA) ch. 1997	Rare Review (USA); 1991	Royal Tantrum (USA)	Hannimo (USA) (Family:4-r)
