= Texas Red (horse) =

American-bred Thoroughbred racehorse

- Sire: Afleet Alex
- Grandsire: Northern Afleet
- Dam: Ramatuelle
- Damsire: Jeune Homme
- Sex: Colt
- Foaled: 15 March 2012
- Country: United States
- Colour: Bay
- Breeder: Stonestreet Thoroughbred Holdings
- Owner: Erich Brehm, Wayne Detmar et al
- Trainer: J. Keith Desormeaux
- Record: 8: 3–3–1
- Earnings: $1,692,300

Major wins
- Breeders' Cup Juvenile (2014); Jim Dandy Stakes (2015)

Texas Red (foaled March 15, 2012) is an American Thoroughbred racehorse. In 2014, he won one minor race from his first four starts and then established himself as one of the top two-year-old colts in North America with a six and a half length win in the Breeders' Cup Juvenile. He has unique connections, as his part-owner/trainer and his usual jockey are brothers: Keith and Kent Desormeaux.

== Background ==
Texas Red is a bay colt with a white star bred in Kentucky by Stonestreet Thoroughbred Holdings. He was sired by Afleet Alex, who won the Preakness Stakes and the Belmont Stakes in 2005 when he was voted American Champion Three-Year-Old Male Horse. At stud, Afleet Alex has also sired Afleet Express (Travers Stakes), Afleet Again (Breeders' Cup Marathon), Iotapa (Vanity Handicap), and Dublin (Hopeful Stakes). Texas Red's dam, Ramatuelle, was a successful racemare in Chile before being sent to the United States, where she was placed in the Desert Stormer Handicap. As a descendant of the Argentinian mare Sixtina, Ramatuelle was a distant relative of several major winners including Crow.

In September 2013, the yearling colt was consigned by Three Chimneys Sales to the Keeneland Sales and was bought for $17,000 by Eric Brehm on behalf of a partnership that included Keith Desormeaux, Lee Michaels, Wayne Detmar, and Gene Voss. Keith Desormeaux later commented, "I still don’t realize how we got him for such a price because he was a physical masterpiece even then – very correct, very confident, very intelligent looking, all the things we look for as horsemen in trying to acquire a good animal". During his track career, the colt has been trained by Desormeaux and ridden in most of his races by Desormeaux's brother Kent.

== Racing career ==
=== 2014: two-year-old season ===
Texas Red made his racing debut in a maiden race over five furlongs at Arlington Park on July 3. Ridden by James Graham, he started slowly and lost several lengths but stayed on well to finish second, a neck behind the winner, Mr Lightning Boy. In a similar event over six furlongs at Del Mar twenty-four days later, he finished fourth of ten runners behind Red Button, Homer Matt, and Battle of Evermore after again starting poorly. In this race, he was ridden for the first time by his trainer's brother, Kent Desormeaux, who became his regular jockey. Texas Red recorded his first success in a maiden race at Del Mar on August 21 in which he started 3/1 second favorite behind Battle of Evermore. After racing towards the back of the field in the early stages, he moved up to second approaching the final turn. He overtook the leader, Secreto Primero, inside the final furlong and won by one and a half lengths.

Texas Red was then moved up sharply in class to contest the Grade I FrontRunner Stakes over one and one sixteenth miles at Santa Anita Park on September 27. Starting a 12.5/1 outsider, he was towards the rear of the field in the early stages as usual before making steady progress in the second half of the race to finish third behind the odds-on favorite, American Pharoah, and Calculator. Over the same course and distance on November 1, Texas Red was one of eleven colts to contest the thirty-first running of the Breeders' Cup Juvenile. With American Pharoah ruled out by injury, the joint-favorites were Champagne Stakes winner Daredevil and Breeders' Futurity Stakes winner Carpe Diem, with Texas Red a 14/1 outsider. After his customary slow start, the colt dropped back to last place, several lengths detached from the rest of the eleven-runner field in the early stages. He began to make rapid progress approaching the final turn before moving to the outside at the top of the stretch. Texas Red took the lead inside the last quarter mile and accelerated clear of his rivals to win by six and a half lengths, with Carpe Diem taking second ahead of Upstart and Irish challenger The Great War. After the race, Kent Desormeaux said, "He was so far back there, there was nobody in his way until the quarter-pole, so it was a pretty uneventful trip. When I swung him out he didn’t really need much riding... once I presented him, he just bellied down and extended his stride. Full of power." Commenting on his partnership with his older brother, he added, "We’ve done it all our lives – this is what we know. I got to ride them and stayed small, and Keith has the eye and education."

=== 2015: three-year-old season ===
Texas Red made his three-year-old debut in the San Vicente Stakes on February 1 at Santa Anita. Sent off as the 7/10 favorite, he was out-dueled in the stretch by Lord Nelson, losing by a neck. He was expected to make his next start in the Risen Star Stakes at Fair Grounds on February 21 but was ruled out after developing a foot abscess. Texas Red's first workout following the foot issues occurred on March 14 at Santa Anita. Trainer and co-owner Keith Desormeaux was hoping to start the horse in the Santa Anita Derby as a prep for the Kentucky Derby but admitted at the time that he was under some pressure since Texas Red was trying to come off a month-long layoff to train for a Grade 1 Derby prep race. Three days later, owner Erich Brehm announced that Texas Red would be taken out of consideration for the Kentucky Derby, stating that there would not be enough time to prepare the horse for a race where the necessary qualifying points for a Derby start could be earned.

After a five-month break, Texas Red returned in the Dwyer Stakes at Belmont Park on July 4 and finished second, two and a half lengths behind the winner Speightster. Four weeks later the colt contested the Jim Dandy Stakes (a trial for the Travers Stakes) at Saratoga and started second favorite behind Frosted, a colt who had finished fourth in the Derby and second in the Belmont Stakes. After racing in third place he took the lead entering the straight and held off the late run of Frosted to win by half a length. Kent Desormeaux said "I think he can only improve. He's a huge-striding, real estate-loving kind of horse... His true superior athletic ability to get a mile and a half and a mile and a quarter is what he is best at".

== Assessment and awards ==
In January 2015, Texas Red finished runner-up to American Pharoah in the poll for American Champion Two-Year-Old Male Horse receiving 111 votes to his rival's 126.

== Retirement and stallion career ==
Texas Red retired at the end of 2016. He stands stallion duties at Crestwood Farm in Lexington, Kentucky, with a $7,500 stud fee.

== Pedigree ==
Pedigree of Texas Red (USA), bay colt, 2012
Sire Afleet Alex (USA) 2002	Northern Afleet (USA); 1993	Afleet	Mr. Prospector
Sire Afleet Alex (USA) 2002	Northern Afleet (USA); 1993	Afleet	Polite Lady
Sire Afleet Alex (USA) 2002	Northern Afleet (USA); 1993	Nuryette	Nureyev
Sire Afleet Alex (USA) 2002	Northern Afleet (USA); 1993	Nuryette	Stellarette
Sire Afleet Alex (USA) 2002	Maggy Hawk (USA); 1994	Hawkster	Silver Hawk
Sire Afleet Alex (USA) 2002	Maggy Hawk (USA); 1994	Hawkster	Strait Lane
Sire Afleet Alex (USA) 2002	Maggy Hawk (USA); 1994	Qualique	Hawaii
Sire Afleet Alex (USA) 2002	Maggy Hawk (USA); 1994	Qualique	Dorothy Gaylord
Dam Ramatuelle (CHI) 2000	Jeune Homme (USA); 1990	Nureyev	Northern Dancer
Dam Ramatuelle (CHI) 2000	Jeune Homme (USA); 1990	Nureyev	Special
Dam Ramatuelle (CHI) 2000	Jeune Homme (USA); 1990	Alydariel	Alydar
Dam Ramatuelle (CHI) 2000	Jeune Homme (USA); 1990	Alydariel	Crimson Saint
Dam Ramatuelle (CHI) 2000	Villa Torlonia (CHI); 1991	Roy	Fappiano
Dam Ramatuelle (CHI) 2000	Villa Torlonia (CHI); 1991	Roy	Adlibber
Dam Ramatuelle (CHI) 2000	Villa Torlonia (CHI); 1991	Noble Sixtina	Noble Quillo
Dam Ramatuelle (CHI) 2000	Villa Torlonia (CHI); 1991	Noble Sixtina	La Sixtina (Family: 3-b)

- Texas Red is inbred 3 x 4 to Nureyev, meaning that this stallion appears in both the third and fourth generations of his pedigree.
