= Scrappy T =

American Thoroughbred racehorse

- Sire: Fit To Fight
- Grandsire: Chieftain
- Dam: Perpetual Light
- Damsire: Sunny's Halo
- Sex: Gelding
- Foaled: 2002
- Country: United States
- Colour: Dark Brown
- Breeder: Upson Downs Farm
- Owner: Marshall E. Dowell
- Trainer: W. Robert Bailes
- Record: 15: 3-7-2
- Earnings: $643,489

Major wins
- Withers Stakes (2005); Count Fleet Stakes (2005) American Classic Race placing: Preakness Stakes 2nd (2005)
- Last updated on September 22, 2009

Scrappy T (foaled in Kentucky on March 31, 2002) was an American Thoroughbred racehorse. A descendant of Sunny's Halo, he was sired by Fit to Fight and bred by Upson Downs Farm. Scrappy T was a multiple graded stakes winner but is remembered most for his collision with Afleet Alex and runner-up finish in the 2005 Preakness Stakes.

== Early career ==
His trainer, Robbie Bailes, picked Scrappy T at an auction in Florida at the Ocala Breeders Sale as a two-year-old and bought him for $35,000 for owner Marshall Dowell of Mechanicsville, Virginia. Scrappy T trained in a small work stable at the dilapidated Bowie Training Center. After breaking his maiden at Delaware Park, he finished second in his New York stakes debut at odds of 23-1 and two races later won the Count Fleet Stakes at 11-1. His next race was the grade three Whirlaway Stakes on Feb. 12, where he raced uncharacteristically off the lead and dug down in the stretch to finish third, missing first by 1-1/2 lengths.

Scrappy T came back to race in the Wood Memorial Stakes as his final Triple Crown prep, which Bellamy Road won by a record margin with Scrappy T third.

In the grade three $150,000 Withers Stakes at Aqueduct Racetrack, he posted a one-length victory over six challengers. Pressing the early pace set by War Plan, the Fit to Fight gelding took charge turning for home and dug in to hold off a late run by Park Avenue Ball. War Plan held on for third as Scrappy T covered the one-turn mile in 1:35 on a sealed track listed as good.

== Preakness Stakes ==
After the Withers, Scrappy T was entered in the grade one Preakness Stakes. He was listed on the morning line as the eleventh choice at 20-1 in a full field of fourteen stakes winners in the second jewel of the Triple Crown. The vast majority of public support was wagered on the top three finishers in the Derby: Afleet Alex, Giacomo, and Closing Argument.

As the gates opened, Scrappy T had the best break and cleared the field. Going into Pimlico's famous club house turn, speedy Going Wild led the field followed by High Limit, Scrappy T, and Galloping Grocer. Down the back stretch, High Limit pulled in front and led for a half mile followed by Going Wild. Jockey Ramon Dominguez wrestled with Scrappy T to settle down and conserve some energy back in third. On the far turn, Scrappy T took the lead. In the meantime, favorite Afleet Alex weaved through traffic and came up on the outside flank of Scrappy T. Dominguez hit Scrappy T with a left-handed whip. Tasting his first left-handed whip, Scrappy T veered right suddenly and blew the turn while Afleet Alex was attempting to pass him. The horses collided, with Afleet Alex knocked to his knees. Jeremy Rose righted Afleet Alex and rode him to a four and three quarter length win with Scrappy T second ahead of Derby winner Giacomo and millionaire Sun King by five and six lengths respectively. He earned $200,000 for the runner-up finish and skipped the Belmont Stakes.

== Retirement ==
Scrappy T retired before the 2008 season began. As a gelding, he could not go to stud. He now lives on the William Mason Farm on the family property in Powhatan, Virginia, fox hunting with his handler, Danielle Mason.

After a fox hunting career alongside his handler, Danielle Mason, Scrappy T eventually found his way to Suffolk, Virginia. There, he was stabled at Happy Valley Farm under the care of Jamee Albright. During his time at the farm, he was leased by Missy Paradee Marven. She purchased him in February 2020.

Shortly afterward, Missy moved Scrappy T to Seahorse Run, a nearby farm also in Suffolk, owned and operated by Laura Gladden. It was here that he began a new chapter, exploring the art of dressage with local trainer Laura Celia.

Scrappy T is now semi-retired.
