= Tiago (horse) =

Thoroughbred racehorse

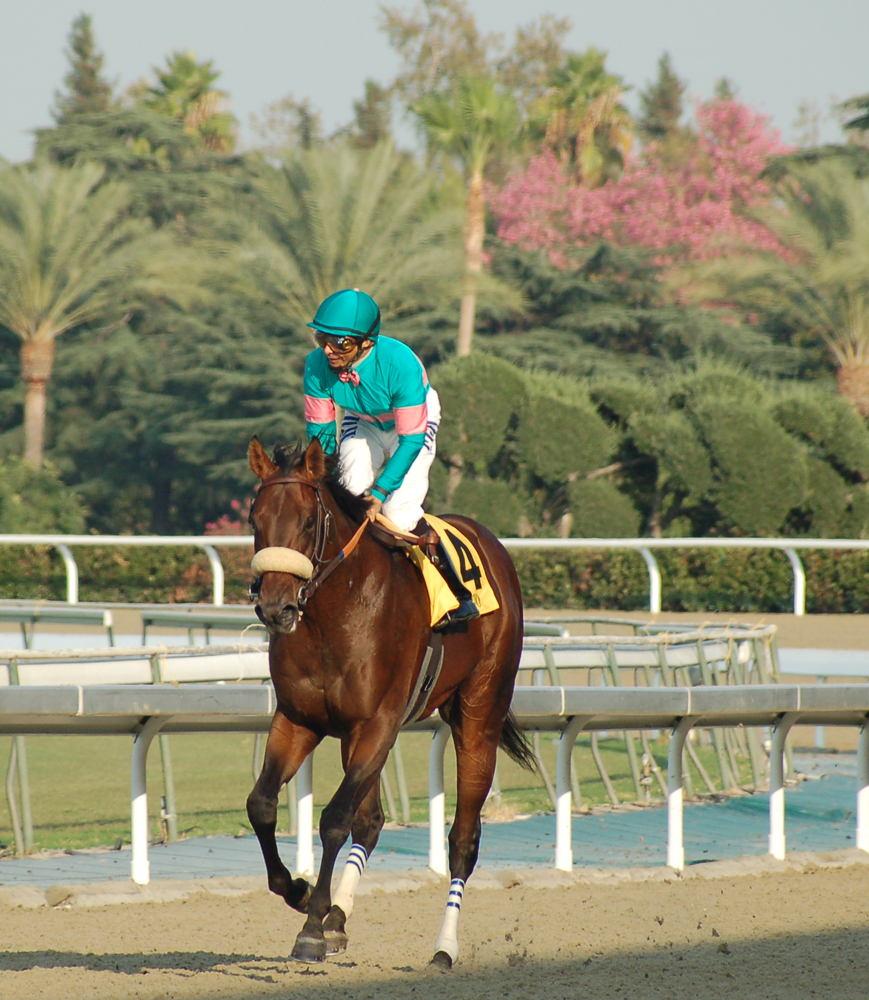
- Tiago and jockey Mike E. Smith after winning the 2007 Goodwood Handicap.
- Sire: Pleasant Tap
- Grandsire: Pleasant Colony
- Dam: Set Them Free
- Damsire: Stop The Music
- Sex: Stallion
- Foaled: 2004
- Country: United States
- Colour: Dark Bay
- Breeder: Jerome & Ann Moss
- Owner: Jerome & Ann Moss
- Trainer: John Shirreffs
- Record: 18: 5-3-4
- Earnings: $2,334,270

Major wins
- Santa Anita Derby (2007); Swaps Stakes (2007); Goodwood Breeders' Cup Handicap (2007); Oaklawn Handicap (2008)

Tiago (foaled March 8, 2004, died November 2015) was an American Thoroughbred racehorse who won the 2007 Santa Anita Derby and Awesome Again Stakes.

== Background ==
His sire was the 1992 U.S. Outstanding Older Male Horse, Pleasant Tap. His dam was the stakes winning mare Set Them Free, by Stop The Music, making him a half-brother to 2005 Kentucky Derby winner Giacomo. The colt was named after the son of singer Sergio Mendes, a longtime friend of the owners. Tiago and Giacomo are the same names, meaning James, the first being Portuguese and the second Italian. The two horses also shared the same racing silks.

== Racing career ==
=== 2006: two-year-old season ===
Tiago made his racing debut as a two-year-old in a Maiden Special Weight race at Santa Anita Park on December 26, in which he placed third.

=== 2007: three-year-old season ===
On January 23, Tiago finished second in another Maiden Special Weight race but was bumped to first place after the leader was disqualified for interference down the stretch. The colt then ran in the Grade 2 Robert B. Lewis Stakes on March 3, 2007, where he finished seventh. On April 7, Tiago won the Grade 1 Santa Anita Derby at odds of 29–1. This was jockey Mike E. Smith's first race on Tiago. On May 5, Tiago made his first appearance outside of Southern California racing circuit, placing seventh in the 133rd running of the Kentucky Derby, which was won by Street Sense at Churchill Downs. Tiago then returned to California to train and skipped the second leg of the Triple Crown, the Preakness Stakes. The colt returned to the East Coast to finish third behind Rags to Riches and Curlin in the 139th running of the Belmont Stakes on June 9, 2007, at Belmont Park.

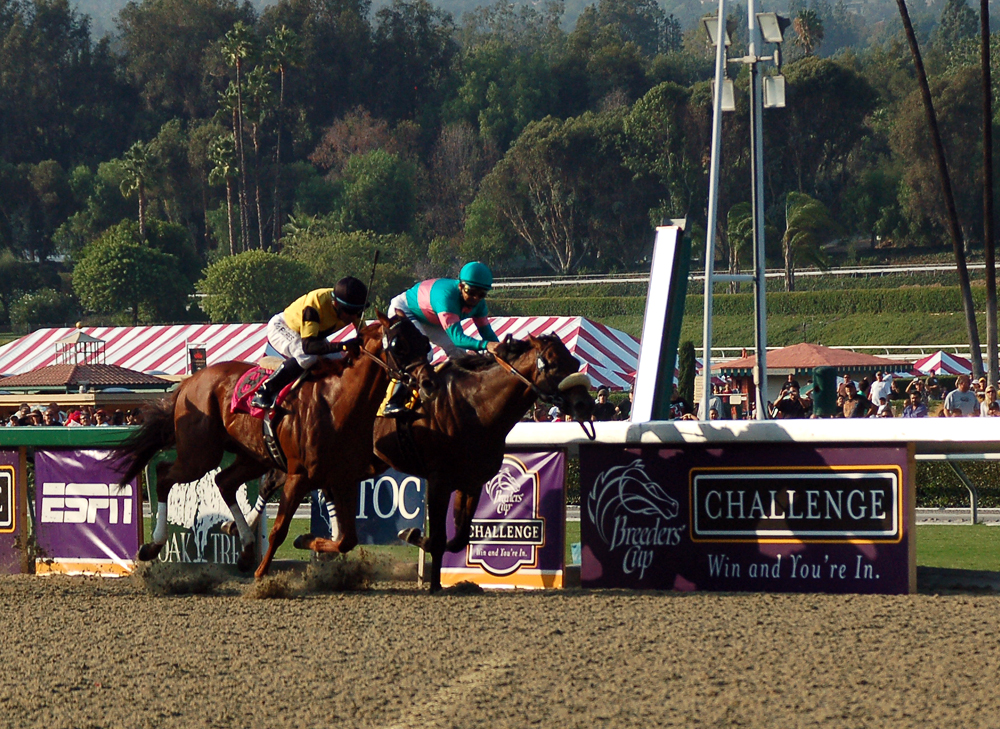
Tiago duels with Awesome Gem to win the 2007 Goodwood Handicap.

Tiago then rebounded with a score in the Grade 2 Swaps Stakes at Hollywood Park on July 14. In this race, the colt maintained a stalking position until the stretch, where he powered through a gap along the rail to win. Tiago was to make his first start against older horses in the August 19 Pacific Classic Stakes at Del Mar Racetrack but was scratched the morning of the race due to trainer John Shirreffs's apprehension about the Polytrack surface.

On September 29, he won the Grade 1 Goodwood Breeders' Cup Handicap at Santa Anita Park by a nose over Awesome Gem. This guaranteed the colt an automatic berth in the Breeders' Cup Classic due to the new "Win and you're in" program. He was the only three-year-old in the Goodwood Handicap, winning over older and more experienced horses. The colt was so excited in the testing barn after the race that he had to be administered a tranquilizer. On October 27, Tiago participated in the Breeders' Cup Classic at Monmouth Park. Normally a very energetic colt, he was seen with his head held down as his groom walked him to the paddock before being saddled for the race. At the start of the Classic, he broke slowly and took up the rear behind Awesome Gem, Street Sense, and Curlin, Tiago finished fifth on the sloppy track.

Tiago is led by Shirreff-barn foreman Frank Leal to the paddock for the Breeders' Cup Classic.

=== 2008: four-year-old season ===
Tiago made his first start of the 2008 season in the Grade 2 San Fernando Stakes at Santa Anita Park. Tiago remained mid pack along the backstretch but could not overtake the leaders when he tried to close down the stretch and finished third, two lengths behind the winner. It had been approximately two and half months since the colt last raced, and the shorter distance of this race compared to his previous endeavours may have played a factor in his performance.

On February 2, Tiago made his second start of 2008 in the Grade 2 Strub Stakes at Santa Anita. He finished second, beaten 4½ lengths by Monterey Jazz. Afterwards, his trainer, John Shirreffs, said that he was pleased with the colt's effort. On March 1, Tiago finished a fast-closing fourth behind Heatseeker, Go Between, and Champs Elysees in the Grade 1 Santa Anita Handicap at Santa Anita Park. On April 5, Tiago earned his first victory as a four-year-old when he captured the Grade 2 Oaklawn Handicap at Oaklawn Park Race Track in Hot Springs, Arkansas, by a head over Heatseeker after a stretch duel.

On October 25 at Santa Anita Park, Tiago finished third in the Breeders' Cup Classic, picking up $500,000. He finished behind European invaders Raven's Pass and Henrythenavigator while finishing ahead of reigning Horse of the Year Curlin.

=== 2009: five-year-old season ===
In 2009, Tiago finished 3rd in the San Antonio Stakes behind Magnum and eventual 2009 Dubai World Cup winner Well Armed. Tiago was supposed to be entered in the Santa Anita Handicap, but he did not eat his food. His owners decided it was best to scratch him from the race. Later, Tiago was entered in an overnight stakes race at Del Mar on the turf, where he finished 6th.

He then ran in the Goodwood Stakes at Oak Tree at Santa Anita and finished 10th. After the start, John Shirreffs said Tiago suffered a career-ending injury, and he was sent to stud at Adena Springs Farm in Paris, Kentucky.

Tiago earned over $2.3 million in his racing career. He was euthanized in November 2015 after a long battle with a chronic digestive disorder that was reportedly inoperable.
