= 2005 Belmont Stakes =

American horse race

137th Belmont Stakes
- Belmont Stakes
- Location: Belmont Park; Elmont, New York, U.S.
- Date: June 11, 2005
- Distance: 1 1/2 mi (12 furlongs; 2,414 m)
- Winning horse: Afleet Alex
- Winning time: 2:28.75
- Final odds: 1.15 (to 1)
- Jockey: Jeremy Rose
- Trainer: Timothy Ritchey
- Owner: Cash is King LLC
- Conditions: Fast
- Surface: Dirt

The 2005 Belmont Stakes was the 137th running of the Belmont Stakes. The 1 1/2-mile (2,400 m) race, known as the "test of the champion" and sometimes called the "final jewel" in thoroughbred horse racing's Triple Crown series. It was held on June 11, 2005, three weeks after the Preakness Stakes and five weeks after the Kentucky Derby.

In 2005, the Kentucky Derby was won by long-shot Giacomo while the Preakness Stakes was won by Afleet Alex. Therefore, there was no Triple Crown at stake, which caused a sharp decline in attendance from the year before when Smarty Jones was attempting to sweep the three races. The race proved fairly uneventful, with favorite Afleet Alex winning by seven lengths and stamping himself as the top three-year-old in the nation. Longshots finished in the next three places, resulting in high payouts for the trifecta and superfecta.

== Pre-race ==
Giacomo won the 2005 Kentucky Derby in a major upset at odds of 50-1. Afleet Alex, who had finished third in the Derby, rebounded to win the Preakness Stakes despite nearly falling when another horse swerved into his path at the head of the stretch. Afleet Alex was favored to win the Belmont, with morning line odds set at 6-5 while Giacomo was the second choice at 4-1. The third choice at 6-1 was Reverberate, who had finished second in his previous start in the Peter Pan Stakes. The other horses in the field were all at double digit odds. Trainer Nick Zito entered three horses in the Belmont, having already entered five in the Derby and three in the Preakness without finishing in the money. Andromeda's Hero was considered to have the best chance, having finished eighth in the Derby and with an excellent pedigree for the taxing distance.

Afleet Alex arrived at Belmont Park on June 4. His trainer Tim Ritchey focused on long exercise sessions to build up the colt's stamina, including two gallops on the Wednesday before the race when the colt galloped a total of 4 1/2 miles. Meanwhile, various racetracks across the country agreed to set up Alex's Lemonade Stands on Belmont day to raise money for pediatric cancer research. The charity was set up by a young girl, Alex Scott, and had come to the attention of Afleet Alex's owners. By the end of 2005, over $4 million had been raised. By 2015, the fundraising has surpassed $100 million, and the publicity associated with Afleet Alex's Triple Crown run was a major factor in the continued success.

A "docile" crowd of 62,274 showed up to watch the race. The previous year, a record crowd of over 120,000 had attended to watch Smarty Jones attempt to sweep the Triple Crown.

== Race description ==
Longshot Pinpoint went to the early lead and set a slow pace, with Afleet Alex sitting back in eighth place. His jockey, Jeremy Rose, had been cautioned about making his move too early – a common mistake for young jockeys not familiar with the dimensions of Belmont Park. "He was the best horse", he said. "I knew that if I didn't do something stupid, I was going to win this race. He's just that good."

His biggest challenger, Giacomo, raced just a few lengths behind the early leaders, a change from his normal come-from-behind tactics. His jockey Mike Smith explained that the horse had "flipped his palate" before the start of the race, which obstructed his breathing. "I could hear (a roaring sound) into the gate", said Smith, "and it got louder during the race." By being closer to the pace, Smith hoped to conserve energy and get a jump on Afleet Alex. Giacomo moved to the lead at the top of the stretch but then tired, eventually finishing seventh.

Afleet Alex continued to rate near the back of the pack for the first 1 1/8 miles then unleashed a "devastating" kick around the far turn. He quickly hit the lead and continued to draw away down the stretch, winning by seven lengths. He ran the final quarter mile in 24.50 seconds, the fastest closing fraction since Arts and Letters in 1969. "We expected this kind of performance", said Ritchey. "I wasn't surprised he was that far back, but when he got rolling, it was a lot of fun."

Andromeda's Hero and Nolan's Cat used similar tactics to Afleet Alex but could not match his acceleration. Andromeda's Hero moved from 10th place early in the race to finish 2nd, while Nolan's Cat closed from 11th to 3rd. "I stayed comfortable in good position, trying to stay close to Afleet Alex," said Rafael Bejarano, the jockey of Andromeda's Hero. "When he moved at the three-eighths pole, I followed him, and when I asked my horse at the quarter pole, my horse started running strong. But Afleet Alex just ran away."

Due to the slow early pace, the final time was a modest 2:28.75.

== Chart ==
Finish	Program Number	Margin	Horse	Jockey	Trainer	Post Time Odds	Winnings
1	9	7	Afleet Alex	Jeremy Rose	Timothy F. Ritchey	1.15	$600,000
2	7	6 3/4	Andromeda's Hero	Rafael Bejarano	Nicholas Zito	11.90	$200,000
3	1	2 1/4	Nolan's Cat	Norberto Arroyo Jr.	Dale Romans	20.80	$110,000
4	10	1	Indy Storm	Edgar Prado	Nicholas Zito	17.10	$60,000
5	3	Neck	A. P. Arrow	Jerry Bailey	D. Wayne Lukas	16.40	$30,000
6	11	1/2	Chekhov	Gary Stevens	Patrick Biancone	15.10	
7	5	Head	Giacomo	Mike E. Smith	John Shirreffs	5.10	
8	4	4 1/4	Southern Africa	Jon Court	Michael Puhich	15.40	
9	6	12	Watchmon	Javier Castellano	Patrick Reynolds	20.80	
10	8	3/4	Reverberate	José A. Santos	Sal Russo	11.80	
11	2		Pinpoint	John Velazquez	Nicholas Zito	15.60	

Source: Equibase
Times: 1/4 – 0:24.47; 1/2 – 0:48.62; 3/4 – 1:12.92; mile – 1:38.05; 1 1/4 – 2:02.45; final – 2:28.75.
Fractional Splits: (:24.47) (:24.15) (:24.30) (:25.13) (:26.20) (:24.50)

== Payout ==
The 137th Belmont Payout Schedule

Program Number	Horse Name	Win	Place	Show
9	Afleet Alex	$4.30	$3.60	$3.00
7	Andromeda's Hero	-	$8.20	$5.80
1	Nolan's Cat	-	-	$7.20

- $2 Exacta (9-7): $44.00
- $2 Trifecta (9-7-1): $1,249.00
- $1 Superfecta (9-7-1-10): $14,219.00

== See also ==
- 2005 Kentucky Derby
- 2005 Preakness Stakes
