= Set Them Free =

American-bred Thoroughbred racehorse

- Sire: Stop The Music
- Grandsire: Hail To Reason
- Dam: Valseuse
- Damsire: Tyrant
- Sex: Mare
- Foaled: February 11, 1990
- Died: October 30, 2018 (aged 28)
- Country: United States
- Colour: Bay
- Breeder: Raceland
- Owner: Ann & Jerome Moss
- Trainer: Brian A. Mayberry
- Record: 12: 5-1-2
- Earnings: $173,275

Major wins
- Pasadena Stakes (1992); Debutante Breeders' Cup Stakes (1992); Very Subtle Handicap (1994); Eloquent Handicap (1994)

Set Them Free (foaled February 11, 1990, in Kentucky, died October 30, 2018) was an American thoroughbred mare racehorse. She was sired by stakes winner Stop The Music, who in turn was sired by the 1960 U.S. Champion 2-Yr-Old Colt, Hail To Reason, out of the Tyrant mare Valseuse.

She was purchased as a two-year-old by Ann and Jerome Moss at the 1992 Fasig-Tipton Calder sale for $45,000 through the late trainer Brian Mayberry and was named for a song by the recording artist Sting.

Known as a sprint specialist, at age two Set Them Free won the Pasadena Stakes at Santa Anita Park and the Debutante Breeders' Cup Stakes at Bay Meadows Racetrack. She placed 11th in the Breeders' Cup Juvenile Fillies.

Set Them Free was best known for her success as a broodmare. She was the dam of two Kentucky Derby entrants: 2005 winner Giacomo, by Holy Bull, and Tiago, by Pleasant Tap.

== Resources ==
- Pedigree & Partial Stats
