= Maryland Sprint Stakes =

- Class: Grade III
- Location: Pimlico Race Course, Baltimore, Maryland, United States
- Inaugurated: 1987 (as Maryland Budweiser Breeders' Cup Handicap)
- Race type: Thoroughbred - Flat racing
- Website: www.pimlico.com

Race information
- Distance: 6 furlong sprint
- Surface: Dirt
- Track: left-handed
- Qualification: Three-years-old and older
- Weight: Base weights with allowances: 4-year-olds and up: 126 lbs. 3-year-olds: 120 lbs.
- Purse: $150,000 (since 2013)

The Maryland Sprint Stakes is a Grade III American Thoroughbred horse race for three-year-olds and older over a distance of six furlongs run annually in mid May on Preakness Stakes day at Pimlico Race Course in Baltimore, Maryland.

== History ==
The inaugural running of the event was on 13 June 1987 as the Maryland Budweiser Breeders' Cup Handicap at Laurel Park Racecourse over a distance of seven furlongs. Between 1987 and 2006, the Breeders' Cup sponsored the event while Budweiser sponsored the event from 1987 to 1995 which reflected in the name of the event.

Since its second running, the race has been run on the Preakness Stakes undercard at Pimlico racetrack over a distance of six furlongs.

The race was first awarded graded status by the American Graded Stakes Committee of the Thoroughbred Owners and Breeders Association in 1994.

The event was changed to the Maryland Sprint Stakes in 2017 when the conditions of the race were modified to be stakes with allowance weight conditions.

The event was the lead off leg of the Mid Atlantic Thoroughbred Championships Sprint Dirt Division or MATCh Races, a series of five races in five separate thoroughbred divisions run throughout four Mid-Atlantic States.

Due to the COVID-19 pandemic in the United States the Preakness Carnival was moved to October and the event was not scheduled.

== Records ==
Speed record:

- 6 furlongs – 1:09.07 - Forest Wildcat (1996)

Margins:

- 7 3/4 lengths – Snow Ridge (2002)

Most wins:

- No horse has won this race more than once.

Most wins by a jockey:

- 3 - Jerry Bailey (1993, 1998, 1999)
- 3 - Edgar Prado (1994, 2005, 2008)
- 3 - Ricardo Santana Jr. (2017, 2018, 2019)

Most wins by a trainer:

- 4 - D. Wayne Lukas (1995, 1999, 2002, 2012)
- 4 - Steven M. Asmussen (2018, 2019, 2022, 2025)

Most wins by an owner:

- 2 - Overbrook Farm (1995, 2002)

== Winners ==
Year	Winner	Age	Jockey	Trainer	Owner	Distance	Time	Purse	Grade	Ref
At Laurel Park – Maryland Sprint Stakes
2026	Bring the Smoke	4	Tyler Gaffalione	D. Whitworth Beckman	Awestrike Racing, Berry Family Racing, Legion Racing, GLAM Racing & Clarke Ohrstrom	6 furlongs	1:10.73	$150,000	III	
At Pimlico
2025	Booth	4	Erik Asmussen	Steven M. Asmussen	William L. Heiligbrodt, Corinne Heiligbrodt, Jackpot Farm & Whispering Oaks Farm	6 furlongs	1:10.39	$148,500	III	
2024	Super Chow	4	Javier Castellano	Jorge Delagado	Lea Farms	6 furlongs	1:11.19	$100,000	III	
2023	Straight No Chaser	4	John R. Velazquez	Dan Blacker	MyRacehorse	6 furlongs	1:08.27	$100,000	III	
2022	Jaxon Traveler	4	Joel Rosario	Steven M. Asmussen	West Point Thoroughbreds & Marvin Delfiner	6 furlongs	1:09.70	$150,000	III	
2021	Special Reserve	5	Irad Ortiz Jr.	Michael J. Maker	Paradise Farms & David Staudacher	6 furlongs	1:08.91	$142,500	III	
2020	Race not held									
2019	New York Central	4	Ricardo Santana Jr.	Steven M. Asmussen	Winstar Farm, China Horse Club & SF Racing	6 furlongs	1:08.74	$150,000	III	
2018	Switzerland	4	Ricardo Santana Jr.	Steven M. Asmussen	Woodford Racing	6 furlongs	1:09.43	$150,000	III	
2017	Whitmore	4	Ricardo Santana Jr.	Ron Moquett	Robert V. LaPenta, Southern Springs Stables & Head of Plains Partners	6 furlongs	1:09.90	$150,000	III	
Maryland Sprint Handicap
2016	Always Sunshine	4	Frankie Pennington	Edward T. Allard	Stonehedge	6 furlongs	1:10.49	$150,000	III	
2015	Sandbar	4	Joel Rosario	Joe Sharp	Kenneth and Sarah Ramsey	6 furlongs	1:09.81	$150,000	III	
2014	Happy My Way	4	Joe Bravo	Joe Orseno	Sagamore Farm & Mel Paikoff	6 furlongs	1:09.21	$150,000	III	
2013	Sage Valley	4	John R. Velazquez	Rudy R. Rodriguez	Michael Dubb	6 furlongs	1:10.51	$150,000	III	
2012	Hamazing Destiny	6	Corey Nakatani	D. Wayne Lukas	Westrock Stables & Barry Butzow	6 furlongs	1:10.48	$100,000	III	
2011	Ventana	5	Martin Garcia	Bob Baffert	Karl Watson, Michael E. Pegram & Paul Weitman	6 furlongs	1:09.88	$100,000	III	
2010	Taqarub	4	Eibar Coa	Kiaran P. McLaughlin	Shadwell Stable	6 furlongs	1:10.02	$100,000	III	
2009	Ravalo	5	John R. Velazquez	Donald H. Barr	Lindy M. Redding	6 furlongs	1:09.95	$100,000	III	
2008	Starforaday	5	Edgar S. Prado	Gary C. Contessa	Winning Move Stable	6 furlongs	1:09.80	$100,000	III	
2007	Diabolical	4	Mario G. Pino	Steve Klesaris	Jeff Puglisi & Steve Klesaris	6 furlongs	1:09.16	$198,500	III	
Maryland Breeders' Cup Sprint Handicap
2006	Friendly Island	5	Garrett K. Gomez	Todd A. Pletcher	Anstu Stable	6 furlongs	1:09.94	$190,000	III	
Maryland Breeders' Cup Handicap
2005	Willy o'the Valley	4	Edgar S. Prado	Richard E. Dutrow Jr.	IEAH Stables	6 furlongs	1:09.95	$189,000	III	
2004	Gators N Bears	4	Charles C. Lopez	Leo S. Nechamkin II	Leo S. Nechamkin II	6 furlongs	1:10.84	$186,000	III	
2003	§ Pioneer Boy	5	Jeremy Rose	John J. Robb	Michael J. Gill	6 furlongs	1:10.35	$200,000	III	
2002	Snow Ridge	4	Mike E. Smith	D. Wayne Lukas	Overbrook Farm	6 furlongs	1:10.06	$200,000	III	
2001	Disco Rico	4	Harry Vega	Valora A. Testerman	Alfred DiRico	6 furlongs	1:10.40	$200,000	III	
2000	Dr. Max	4	Shane Sellers	Gloria M. Wenderoth	Martin B. Bernstein & Rufus Freeman	6 furlongs	1:10.91	$137,000	III	
1999	Yes It's True	3	Jerry D. Bailey	D. Wayne Lukas	Padua Stable	6 furlongs	1:09.20	$194,000	III	
1998	Richter Scale	4	Jerry D. Bailey	William I. Mott	Nancy R. and Richard S. Kaster	6 furlongs	1:09.45	$200,000	III	
1997	Cat Be Nimble	5	Joseph Rocco	Timothy F. Ritchey	Candy Stable	6 furlongs	1:10.12	$209,600	III	
1996	§ Forest Wildcat	5	Joe Bravo	Ben W. Perkins Sr.	New Farm	6 furlongs	1:09.07	$216,200	III	
Maryland Budweiser Breeders' Cup Handicap
1995	Commanche Trail	4	Mike E. Smith	D. Wayne Lukas	Overbrook Farm	6 furlongs	1:09.35	$154,750	III	
1994	Secret Odds	4	Edgar S. Prado	Lawrence E. Murray	Sondra D. Bender	6 furlongs	1:10.38	$156,025	III	
1993	Senor Speedy	6	Jerry D. Bailey	Alfredo Callejas	Robert Perez	6 furlongs	1:09.69	$155,650	Listed	
1992	Potentiality	6	Pat Day	Robert E. Holthus	Dan Jones & Halford E. Sutton	6 furlongs	1:10.25	$155,500	Listed	
1991	Jeweler's Choice	6	Chris McCarron	John W. Hicks III	Fourbros Stable	6 furlongs	1:10.38	$154,350	Listed	
1990	Norquestor	4	Craig Perret	Sonny Hine	Scott C. Savin	6 furlongs	1:09.40	$155,900		
1989	King's Nest	5	Joseph Rocco	Lawrence E. Murray	Sondra D. Bender	6 furlongs	1:09.60	$127,650		
1988	Fire Plug	5	Josiah F. Hampshire Jr.	Eddie Gaudet	Arthur I. Appleton	6 furlongs	1:10.60	$84,800		
At Laurel Park
1987	Purple Mountain	5	Eliezer Ortiz Jr.	Woodrow M. Sedlacek	Jacques D. Wimpfheimer	7 furlongs	1:24.40	$144,000		

Notes:
§ Ran as an entry

== See also ==
- Maryland Sprint Handicap "top three finishers" and starters
- List of American and Canadian Graded races

== External sites ==
- Pimlico Race Course official website
