= Maryland Sprint Handicap top three finishers =

This is a listing of the horses that finished in either first, second, or third place and the number of starters in the Maryland Sprint Handicap, an American graded stakes race run on dirt over six furlongs at Pimlico Race Course in Baltimore, Maryland.

Year	Winner	Second	Third	Starters
2026	Bring the Smoke	Faust	Haileysfirstnotion	7
2025	Booth	Epic Ride	Celtic Contender	5
2024	Super Chow	Prevalence	Prince Of Jericho	6
2023	Straight No Chaser	Prevalence	Nakatomi	9
2022	Jaxon Traveler	Three Over Deuces	War Tocsin	6
2021	Special Reserve	Strike Power	Frosted Grace	11
2020	Karan's Notion	Baptize the Boy	Lewisfield	14
2019	New York central	Proforma	Lewisfield	7
2018	Switzerland	Long Haul Bay	Lewisfield	9
2017	Whitmore	A. P. Indian	Awesome Banner	9
2016	Always Sunshine	All Star Red	Rockinn On Bye	7
2015	Sandbar	Service For Ten	Happy My Way	8
2014	Happy My Way	Lemon Drop Dream	Service for Ten	6
2013	Sage Valley	Hardened Wildcat	Laurie's Rocket	10
2012	Hamazing Destiny	Band Box	Action Andy	10
2011	Ventana	Immortal Eyes	China	9
2010	Taqarub	Roaring Lion	Ravalo	10
2009	Ravalo	Silver Edition	Celtic Innis	7
2008	Starforaday	Suave Jazz	Cognac Kisses	8
2007	Diabolical	Talent Search	Semaphore Man	7
2006	Friendly Island	Celtic Innis	Gaff	7
2005	Willy o'the Valley	With Distinction	Take Achance On Me	8
2004	Gators N Bears	Highway Prospector	Sassy Hound	9
2003	Pioneer Boy	Sassy Hound	Highway Prospector	7
2002	Snow Ridge	Smile My Lord	Clever Gem	7
2001	Disco Rico	Flame Thrower	Istintaj	6
2000	Dr. Max	Moon Over Prospect	Crucible	7
1999	Yes It's True	The Trader's Echo	Purple Passion	8
1998	Richter Scale	Trafalgar	Original Gray	7
1997	Cat Be Nimble	Political Whit	Excelerate	7
1996	Forest Wildcat	Kayrawan	Demaloot Demashoot	9
1995	Commanche Trail	Goldminer's Dream	Marry Me Do	6
1994	Secret Odds	Honor the Hero	Linear	10
1993	Senor Speedy	He Is Risen	Who Wouldn't	7
1992	Potentiality	Smart Alec	Boom Towner	9
1991	Jeweler's Choice	Shuttleman	Hadif	5
1990	Norquestor	Kechi	Americo's Bullet	9
1989	King's Nest	Silano	Regal Intention	6
1988	Fire Plug	Harriman	High Brite	6
1987	Purple Mountain	Little Bold John	Berngoo	6
