= 2005 Preakness Stakes =

130th running of the Preakness Stakes

130th Preakness Stakes
- The Preakness Stakes
- "The Middle Jewel of the Triple Crown" "The Run for the Black-Eyed Susans"
- Location: Pimlico Race Course, Baltimore, Maryland, United States
- Date: May 21, 2005
- Winning horse: Afleet Alex
- Winning time: 1:55.04
- Final odds: 3.3-1
- Jockey: Jeremy Rose
- Trainer: Timothy F. Ritchey
- Conditions: Fast
- Surface: Dirt
- Attendance: 125,687

The 2005 Preakness Stakes was the 130th running of the Preakness Stakes thoroughbred horse race. The race took place on May 21, 2005, and was televised in the United States on the NBC television network. Afleet Alex, who was jockeyed by Jeremy Rose, won the race by four and three quarter lengths over runner-up Scrappy T. Approximate post time was 6:21 p.m. Eastern Time. The race was run over a fast track in a final time of 1:55.04. The Maryland Jockey Club reported total attendance of 125,687, this is recorded as second highest on the list of American thoroughbred racing top attended events for North America in 2005.

== Race description ==
Scrappy T broke well and went to the early lead, then was overtaken by High Limit and Going Wild who set a reasonably fast pace. Afleet Alex settled behind the leaders, then started his move on the far turn, racing wide to pass other horses. Scrappy T retook the lead as they rounded into the stretch, but his jockey Ramon Domínguez looked back and saw that Afleet Alex was gaining ground on the outside. Dominguez swung the whip left-handed and Scrappy T swerved sharply away, directly into the path of Afleet Alex. The two horses clipped heels and Afleet Alex stumbled to his knees, his nose nearly touching the ground. "I thought for sure we were going down", said Jeremy Rose, the jockey of Afleet Alex. "The thought process was I was going to get run over. The instinct was just to hang on and try to get my balance back."

The crowd gasped, but Afleet Alex regained his balance and was quickly back into stride. Rose, a young jockey who was riding in the Preakness for the first time, was credited for skill in staying on, but gave the credit to Afleet Alex. "He was just that athletic, and I was just that scared", he said. Scrappy T had reopened his lead after the incident but Afleet Alex soon ran him down and pulled away to win by 4 3/4 lengths.

"Over 30 years, I've seen some horses take some bad steps in races and still win", said trainer Tim Ritchey. "I've never seen a horse stumble that badly and lose his momentum that much to come back on and win in a grade I race like this." Veteran sportswriter Steve Haskin wrote that it "remains arguably the single most athletic feat by a Thoroughbred seen in many years."

== Payout ==
The 130th Preakness Stakes Payout Schedule

Program Number	Horse Name	Win	Place	Show
12	Afleet Alex	US$8.60	$5.00	$3.20
5	Scrappy T	-	$11.20	$5.80
13	Giacomo	-	-	$4.80

- $2 Exacta: (12–5) paid $152.60
- $1 Trifecta: (12–5–13) paid $872.00
- $1 Superfecta: (12–5–13–10) paid $10,362.30

== The full chart ==
Finish Position	Margin (lengths)	Post Position	Horse name	Jockey	Trainer	Owner	Post Time Odds	Purse Earnings
1st	0	12	Afleet Alex	Jeremy Rose	Timothy F. Ritchey	Cash Is King Stables	3.30-1 favorite	$650,000
2nd	4 3/4	5	Scrappy T	Ramon Domínguez	Robert Bailes	Marshall E. Dowell	13.30-1	$200,000
3rd	9 3/4	13	Giacomo	Mike E. Smith	John Shirreffs	Jerry & Ann Moss	6.00-1	$100,000
4th	10 3/4	10	Sun King	Rafael Bejarano	Nicholas P. Zito	Tracy Farmer	21.10-1	$50,000
5th	11 3/4	11	High Limit	Edgar Prado	Robert J. Frankel	Gary & Mary West	18.70-1	
6th	18 1/2	3	Noble Causeway	Gary Stevens	Nicholas P. Zito	My Meadowview Farm	11.30-1	
7th	19 3/4	4	Greeley's Galaxy	David Flores	Warren Stute	B. Wayne Hughes	9.40-1	
8th	20 3/4	1	Malibu Moonshine	Steve Hamilton	King T. Leatherbury	Woodrow Marriott	24.00-1	
9th	27 3/4	7	Closing Argument	Cornelio Velásquez	Kiaran McLaughlin	Phillip & Marsha Cohen	7.20-1	
10th	30	2	High Fly	Jerry Bailey	Nicholas P. Zito	Live Oak Plantation	5.10-1	
11th	35-1/4	6	Hal's Image	José A. Santos	Barry R. Rose	Rose Family Stable	23.50-1	
12th	36	9	Wilko	Corey Nakatani	D. Wayne Lukas	J. Paul Reddam	13.30-1	
13th	37	5	Galloping Grocer	Joe Bravo	Dominick Schettino	R. Rosenthal & B. Waldbaum	27.00-1	
14th	43	14	Going Wild	Robby Albarado	D. Wayne Lukas	Robert B. Lewis	26.50-1	

- Winning Breeder: John Martin Silverland; (FL)
- Final Time: 1:55.04
- Track Condition: Fast
- Total Attendance: 125,687

== See also ==
- 2005 Kentucky Derby
- 2005 Belmont Stakes
