= Stop the Music (horse) =

American-bred Thoroughbred racehorse

Stop The Music
- Sire: Hail To Reason
- Grandsire: Turn-To
- Dam: Bebopper
- Damsire: Tom Fool
- Sex: Stallion
- Foaled: 1970
- Country: United States
- Colour: Bay
- Breeder: Greentree Stud, Inc.
- Owner: Greentree Stud, Inc.
- Trainer: John M. Gaver, Sr.
- Record: 30: 11-10-4
- Earnings: $448,922

Major wins
- Champagne Stakes (1972); Saratoga Special Stakes (1972); Dwyer Stakes (1973)

Stop The Music (March 23, 1970 – July 8, 2005) was an American thoroughbred racehorse and sire.

== Background ==
Owned and bred in Kentucky by the Greentree Stud, Inc., he was sired by Hail To Reason, out of the mare Bebopper, whose sire, Tom Fool, was the leading broodmare sire for 1965 and was inducted into National Museum of Racing and Hall of Fame. He was trained by John M. Gaver, Sr.

== Racing career ==
Stop The Music was born in the same year as Secretariat, and they were rivals in many races. His victory as a two-year-old in the Champagne Stakes under jockey John Rotz came as a result of a disqualification due to Secretariat's bumping incident while rounding the turn. A few weeks later, Stop The Music again met Secretariat in the Laurel Futurity Stakes, but placed second to him.

As a three-year-old, Stop The Music won the Dwyer Stakes. He also set a new track record of 1:33 3/5 at Belmont Park for the mile that stood until Conquistador Cielo broke it in 1982 in the Metropolitan Handicap.

He continued to race at four and five until retirement.

== Retirement ==
Retired to Greentree Stud, Inc., now Gainesway Farm, Stop The Music became a very successful sire with 46 stakes winners and 17 graded stakes race winners. His progeny includes Belmont Stakes winner Temperence Hill, French and Italian champion Squill, Music Merci, Dontstop Themusic, Cure The Blues, and Missy's Mirage.

His daughter, Set Them Free, is the dam of Kentucky Derby winner Giacomo.

On July 8, 2005, Stop The Music was humanely euthanized due to the infirmities of old age.
