= Klix Airfield =

Klix airfield Flugplatz Klix
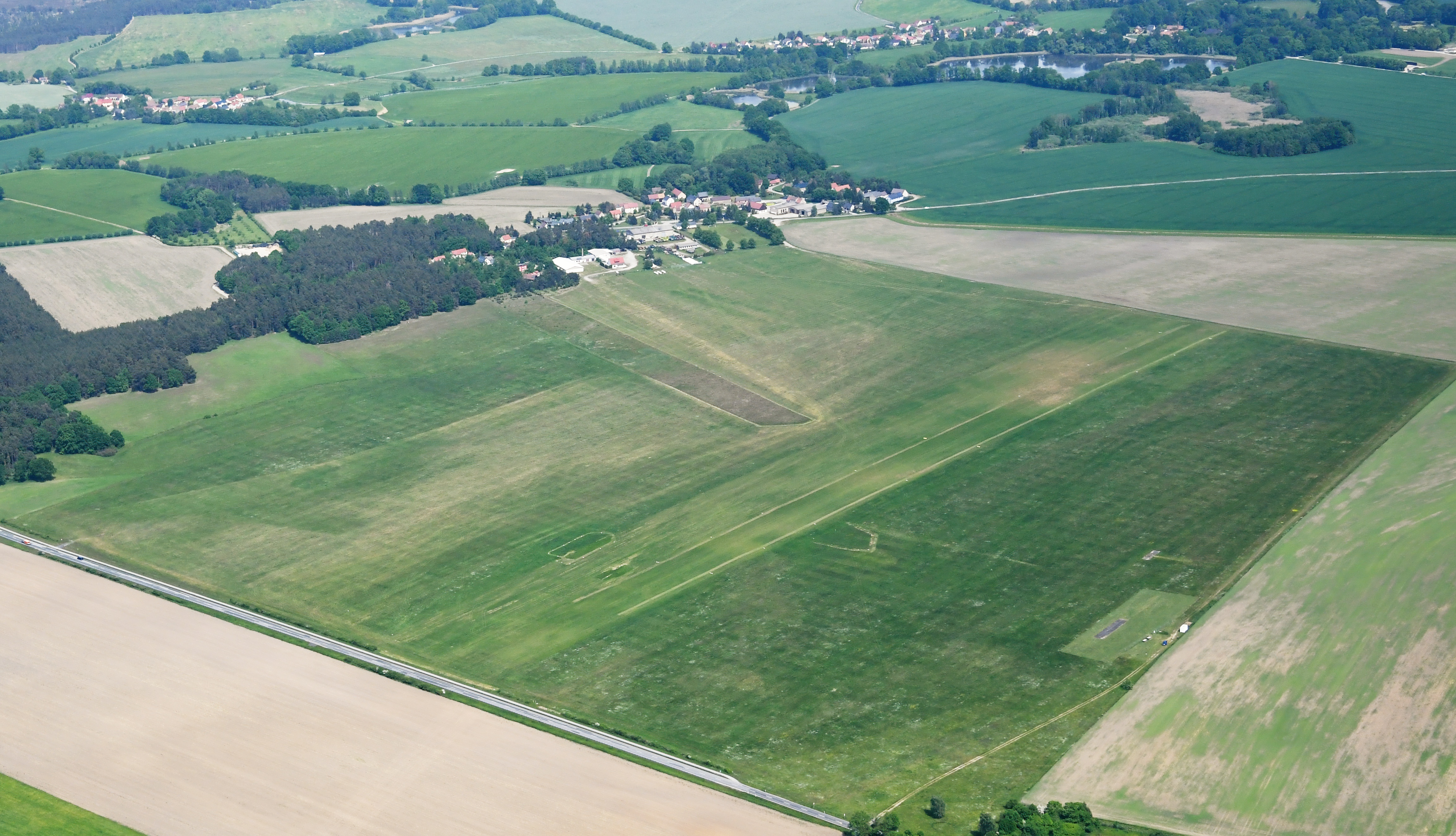
- IATA: none; ICAO: EDCI

Summary
- Serves: Bautzen
- Location: Grossdubrau
- Elevation AMSL: 486 ft / 148 m
- Coordinates: 51°16′42″N 14°30′39″E
- Website: http://www.aeroteam.de
- Interactive map of Klix airfield

Flugplatz Klix is a recreational aerodrome in Germany's far East (Saxonia), close to the Czech border. It boasts very intensive glider activity, but ultralights and other light planes are also accepted.

== History ==
The aerodrome's history started on October 7, 1955, when the first glider took off. In the communist DDR era, it became an important centre of activity for the Gesellschaft für Sport und Technik (GST). Since 1990, it has been operated by the soaring club AeroteamKLIX Segelflugclub.

== Operations ==
Good thermal conditions and little obstructed airspace made the airfield a popular destination for recreational fliers. It also allows excursions to the Leewellen area of the Zittauer mountains, and the mountains of Altvatergebirge and Riesengebirge.
