= 2005 Kentucky Derby =

Horse race

131st Kentucky Derby
- Kentucky Derby
- Location: Churchill Downs
- Date: May 7, 2005
- Winning horse: Giacomo
- Winning time: 2:02.75
- Starting price: 50-1
- Jockey: Mike Smith
- Trainer: John Shirreffs
- Owner: Jerry & Ann Moss
- Conditions: Fast
- Surface: Dirt
- Attendance: 156,435

The 2005 Kentucky Derby was the 131st running of the Kentucky Derby. The race took place on May 7, 2005, and was won by Giacomo, a longshot at odds of 50–1. Another longshot, Closing Argument, finished second, resulting in an exacta payout of $9,814.80. A crowd of 156,435 was in attendance.

== Contenders ==
The 5-2 favorite for the race was Bellamy Road, winner of the Wood Memorial Stakes. Afleet Alex was the second choice based on his win in the Arkansas Derby. Other leading contenders included Wilko (Breeders' Cup Juvenile), High Fly (Florida Derby) and Bandini (Blue Grass Stakes). Giacomo, whose only win was in a maiden race at age two, was one of the longest shots in the field at 50–1. He had finished fourth in the Santa Anita Derby in his previous start.

== Results ==
Spanish Chestnut went to the early lead and set fast opening fractions of 22.28 seconds for the first quarter-mile and 45.38 for the half. Closing Argument sat a few lengths behind and gradually improved his position, taking the lead in mid stretch. Meanwhile, Giacomo broke slowly and settled near the back of the field, carried five wide around the first turn. Still in 18th place after three-quarters of a mile, Giacomo started to make up ground while moving six wide around the turn. He ran into traffic problems entering the stretch but finally found racing room and closed steadily to win by half a length.

"He had to overcome some pretty tricky moves. In the first turn, he got carried out. I had to ease him back, jump heels, save all I could save", said jockey Mike Smith. "Then I saw a little seam turning for home. I got him to the outside, and he just kept grinding and grinding and wouldn't stop until he got it."

It was the first Derby win for all of Giacomo's connections: jockey Smith, trainer John Shirreffs and owners Jerry and Ann Moss. The payout on Giacomo was $102.60 for a $2 bet, at the time the second highest payout in Derby history to Donerail in 1913.

Finish	Post	Horse Name	Jockey	Trainer	Odds	Margin	Earnings
1	10	Giacomo	Mike E. Smith	John Shirreffs	50.30		$1,639,600
2	18	Closing Argument	Cornelio Velásquez	Kiaran McLaughlin	71.60	1/2 length	$400,000
3	12	Afleet Alex	Jeremy Rose	Tim Ritchey	4.50	1 length	$200,000
4	17	Don't Get Mad	Tyler Baze	Ronald Ellis	29.20	3 1/2 lengths	$100,000
5	20	Buzzard's Bay	Mark Guidry	Jeff Mullins	46.30	6 1/4 lengths	$60,000
6	14	Wilko	Corey Nakatani	Wallace Dollase	21.70	6 3/4 lengths	
7	16	Bellamy Road	Javier Castellano	Nicholas Zito	2.60	6 3/4 lengths	
8	2	Andromeda's Hero	Rafael Bejarano	Nicholas Zito	57.30	7 1/2 lengths	
9	7	Flower Alley	Jorge F. Chavez	Todd Pletcher	41.30	7 1/2 lengths	
10	11	High Fly	Jerry Bailey	Nicholas Zito	7.10	7 3/4 lengths	
11	9	Greeley's Galaxy	Kent Desormeaux	Warren Stute	21.00	8 lengths	
12	5	Coin Silver	Pat Valenzuela	Todd Pletcher	38.60	10 1/4 lengths	
13	8	Greater Good	John McKee	Robert Holthus	58.40	11 1/2 lengths	
14	4	Noble Causeway	Gary Stevens	Nicholas Zito	12.30	12 1/4 lengths	
15	3	Sun King	Edgar Prado	Nicholas Zito	15.70	14 3/4 lengths	
16	13	Spanish Chestnut	Joe Bravo	Patrick Biancone	71.00	18 3/4 lengths	
17	1	Sort It Out	Brice Blanc	Bob Baffert	61.90	25 3/4 lengths	
18	19	Going Wild	Jose Valdivia Jr.	D. Wayne Lukas	59.50	29 lengths	
19	15	Bandini	John Velazquez	Todd Pletcher	6.80	32 1/2 lengths	
20	6	High Limit	Ramon A. Dominguez	Robert Frankel	22.50	44 1/2 lengths	

Track condition: Fast

Times: 1/4 mile – 22.28; 1/2 mile – 45.38; 3/4 mile – 1:09.59; mile – 1:35.88; final – 2:02.75.
Splits for each quarter-mile: (22.28) (23.10) (24.21) (26.29) (26.87)

Source: Equibase Chart

== Payout ==
The 131st Kentucky Derby Payout Schedule

Program Number	Horse Name	Win	Place	Show
10	Giacomo	US$102.60	$45.80	$19.80
18	Closing Argument	-	$70.00	$24.80
12	Afleet Alex	-	-	$4.60

- $2 Exacta: (10-18) Paid $9,814.80
- $2 Trifecta: (10-18-12) Paid $133,134.80
- $1 Superfecta: (10-18-12-17) Paid $864,253.50

== Subsequent racing careers ==
Giacomo's only win after the Derby was in the Grade II San Diego Handicap. Two horses went on to record Grade I wins:

- Afleet Alex – Preakness Stakes, Belmont Stakes
- Flower Alley – Travers Stakes

== Subsequent breeding careers ==
=== Sires of Classic winners ===
Flower Alley

- I'll Have Another – 2012 Kentucky Derby, Preakness Stakes, Santa Anita Derby
- Lilacs and Lace – 2011 Ashland Stakes
- Bullards Alley – 2017 Canadian International

=== Sires of Grade I winners ===
Afleet Alex

- Afleet Express – 2010 Travers Stakes
- Dublin – 2009 Hopeful Stakes
- Iotapa – 2014 Vanity Stakes, Clement L. Hirsch Stakes
- Materiality – 2015 Florida Derby
- Texas Red – 2014 Breeders' Cup Juvenile

Bellamy Road

- Diversify – 2017 Jockey Club Gold Cup, 2018 Whitney Stakes
- Toby's Corner – 2011 Wood Memorial

Sources: American Classic Pedigrees, Equibase, Blood-Horse Stallion Register, Racing Post
