= Alex's Lemonade Stand Foundation =

American pediatric cancer charity

- Founder Alex Scott
- Founded: January 18, 2005; 21 years ago
- Founder: Alexandra "Alex" Scott
- Tax ID no.: 56-2496146
- Legal status: 501(c)(3) nonprofit organization
- Headquarters: Bala Cynwyd, Pennsylvania, United States
- Services: Grantmaking for medical research; public awareness and education; travel for pediatric cancer patients and their families.
- Chair: Stephen Cohn
- Co-executive director: Jason Scott
- Co-executive director: Elizabeth Scott
- Revenue: $18,236,617 (2014)
- Expenses: $18,077,820 (2014)
- Endowment: $837,717
- Employees: 48 (2014)
- Volunteers: 22,470 (2014)
- Website: www.alexslemonade.org

Alex's Lemonade Stand Foundation (ALSF), previously known as Alex's Lemonade Stand, is an American pediatric cancer charity started by Alexandra "Alex" Scott (January 18, 1996 – August 1, 2004), who lived in Connecticut before moving to Pennsylvania. Scott suffered from neuroblastoma.

== History ==
Alex Scott held the first lemonade stand in 2000. Five years later the foundation was started in 2005 by Alex's parents.

In November 2019, Alex's Lemonade Stand Foundation was named Non-Profit Organization of the Year by The Chamber of Commerce For Greater Philadelphia.
