= Northern Afleet =

American-bred Thoroughbred racehorse

- Sire: Afleet
- Grandsire: Mr. Prospector
- Dam: Nuryette
- Damsire: Nureyev
- Sex: Stallion
- Foaled: 1993
- Country: United States
- Colour: Bay
- Breeder: Hermitage Farm
- Owner: Anderson and Waranch
- Trainer: David E. Hoffmans
- Record: 21: 5-3-5
- Earnings: $626,671

Major wins
- San Fernando Breeders' Cup Stakes (1997); San Carlos Handicap (1997); San Diego Handicap (1997)

Northern Afleet (January 23, 1993 - June 1, 2018) was an American thoroughbred racehorse and sire. He is best known as the sire of dual Triple Crown Classic winner Afleet Alex and Breeders' Cup winners World Approval and Amazombie

== Background ==
Northern Afleet was bred in Kentucky by Hermitage Farm, a small thoroughbred operation. He was sired by Afleet, a Canadian Horse of the Year, and was out of the unraced Nureyev mare, Nuryette. Northern Afleet's half sister, Tap to the Music (by Pleasant Tap) was a multiple graded stakes winner.

He was owned by Gregg Anderson and Ron Waranch, both developers, business partners, and longtime friends. Northern Afleet was trained by David Hofmans.

== Racing career ==
=== 1995: two-year-old season ===
Northern Afleet started three times as a juvenile, winning his debut, and then running second in the Balboa Stakes and seventh in the Del Mar Futurity.

=== 1996: three-year-old season ===
He opened his sophomore season with a win in an allowance race. He finished second in his next start, the ungraded Jim Neuman Stakes. He finished fifth in the Oceanside Stakes, and hit the board in his next three starts, including the Grade 1 Malibu Stakes.

=== 1997-1998: four- and five-year-old seasons ===
Northern Afleet won his first start as an older horse, winning the San Fernando Stakes in his first graded stakes victory. He finished fifth in the Strub Stakes before winning the San Carlos Handicap. He finished third in both what is now known as the Kona Gold Stakes and Metropolitan Handicap. After running fourth in the Triple Bend Handicap, he won the San Diego Handicap in what was the final win of his career. After running third in the Del Mar Handicap, he finished off the board in his last two starts at four, including the 1997 Breeders' Cup Sprint, where he finished seventh.

As a five-year-old, he made two starts: one in an allowance at Santa Anita Park and another in the Arcadia Handicap, where he finished sixth and fifth respectively.

== Stud career ==
=== Overview ===
Northern Afleet was retired in 1998 after going winless in two starts for the year. He stood his first years as a stallion at Double Diamond Farm in Florida. From his first crop of foals to race, Northern Afleet sired six stakes winners. In 2004, after showing promise as a stallion, Northern Afleet was bought by Taylor Made Farm and moved to Kentucky, where he was bred to 150 mares.

A year after moving to Kentucky, Northern Afleet's son Afleet Alex won the Preakness Stakes and Belmont Stakes, as well as Eclipse Champion 3 Year Old Colt honors, bringing his name more into the public eye.

Northern Afleet has sired 75 blacktype stakes winners, 12 graded stakes winners, 13 Gr.I winners, five champions, and seven earners of over $1 million. As of 2017, Northern Afleet is considered a "value sire", being the only stallion standing in North America standing for under $10,000 to sire a Gr.I winner in seven of the last nine years. Northern Afleet is one of the few stallions to sire a Breeders' Cup Winner, and to have a son sire a Breeders' Cup Winner. His current stud fee is set at $6,500.

=== Notable Progeny ===
Northern Afleet's most notable progeny include:

- Afleet Alex: Winner of the Preakness Stakes, Belmont Stakes, Arkansas Derby, Sanford Stakes, and Hopeful Stakes. 2005 U.S. Champion Three Year Old Male.
- Amazombie: Winner of the Breeders' Cup Sprint, Ancient Title Stakes, Potrero Grande Handicap (twice), and Bing Crosby Stakes. 2011 U.S. Champion Male Sprinter.
- World Approval: Winner of the Breeders' Cup Mile, Woodbine Mile, Fourstardave Handicap, United Nations Stakes, Dixie Stakes, American Derby, and Saranac Stakes.
- Kaigun: Winner of the Play the King Stakes, Seabiscuit Handicap, and Pan American Stakes.
- Teaks North: Winner of the Gulfstream Park Turf Handicap, United Nations Stakes, Monmouth Stakes.
- Evening Jewel: Winner of the Ashland Stakes, Del Mar Oaks, Honeymoon Handicap, and San Clemente Handicap.
- Denman's Call: Winner of the Triple Bend Handicap.
- Baccelo (BRZ): Winner of the Philip H. Iselin Stakes.
- War Story: Winner of the Brooklyn Handicap.
- Negligee: Winner of the Alcibiades Stakes.
- Big City Man: Winner of the Dubai Golden Shaheen, Dr. Fager Stakes, Al Shindagha Sprint and Criterium Stakes.
- Leeman (SDA): Winner of the Abdulaziz Cup.
- Fiddlers Afleet: Multiple stakes winner.

== Death ==
Northern Afleet was euthanized on June 1, 2018, due to severe gastrointestinal disease. He had experienced an episode of acute abdominal pain and was taken to Rood and Riddle Equine Hospital, where veterinarians determined that he had a poor prognosis and subsequently euthanized him.

== Pedigree ==
Pedigree of Northern Afleet, bay horse, foaled January 23, 1993
Sire Afleet ch. 1984	Mr. Prospector b. 1970	Raise a Native ch. 1961	Native Dancer
Sire Afleet ch. 1984	Mr. Prospector b. 1970	Raise a Native ch. 1961	Raise You
Sire Afleet ch. 1984	Mr. Prospector b. 1970	Gold Digger b. 1962	Nashua
Sire Afleet ch. 1984	Mr. Prospector b. 1970	Gold Digger b. 1962	Sequence
Sire Afleet ch. 1984	Polite Lady b. 1977	Venetian Jester ch. 1964	Tom Fool
Sire Afleet ch. 1984	Polite Lady b. 1977	Venetian Jester ch. 1964	Venice
Sire Afleet ch. 1984	Polite Lady b. 1977	Friendly Ways b. 1968	Green Ticket
Sire Afleet ch. 1984	Polite Lady b. 1977	Friendly Ways b. 1968	Ways to Learn
Dam Nuryette b. 1986	Nureyev b. 1977	Northern Dancer b. 1961	Nearctic
Dam Nuryette b. 1986	Nureyev b. 1977	Northern Dancer b. 1961	Natalma
Dam Nuryette b. 1986	Nureyev b. 1977	Special b. 1969	Forli
Dam Nuryette b. 1986	Nureyev b. 1977	Special b. 1969	Thong
Dam Nuryette b. 1986	Stellarette b. 1978	Tentam dkb/br. 1969	Intentionally
Dam Nuryette b. 1986	Stellarette b. 1978	Tentam dkb/br. 1969	Tamerett
Dam Nuryette b. 1986	Stellarette b. 1978	Square Angel b. 1970	Quadrangle
Dam Nuryette b. 1986	Stellarette b. 1978	Square Angel b. 1970	Nangela (Family 14-c)

Northern Afleet is inbred 4S x 5D to Native Dancer, meaning that Native Dancer appears once in the 4th generation of the sire's side and once in the 5th generation of the dam's side. He is also inbred 4S x 5D to Neartic.
