= Hawkster =

American-bred Thoroughbred racehorse

- Sire: Silver Hawk
- Grandsire: Roberto
- Dam: Strait Lane
- Damsire: Chieftain
- Sex: Stallion
- Foaled: 1986
- Country: United States
- Colour: Bay
- Breeder: Robert C. Sims
- Owner: Mr. & Mrs. J. Shelton Meredith
- Trainer: Ron McAnally
- Record: 22: 6–3–4
- Earnings: US$1,409,477

Major wins
- Norfolk Stakes (1988); Del Mar Derby (1989); Oak Tree Invitational Stakes (1989); Oceanside Stakes (1989); Secretariat Stakes (1989)

Hawkster (February 19, 1986 – June 1, 2003) was an American Thoroughbred racehorse who holds the world record of 2:22 4/5 for one and one half miles on Turf set under jockey Russell Baze on October 14, 1989, at Santa Anita Park in Arcadia, California, while winning the Oak Tree Invitational Stakes.

Bred in Kentucky by Robert C. Sims, Hawkster was sired by Silver Hawk and out of the mare, Strait Lane. He was raced by Mr. and Mrs. J. Shelton Meredith. Trained by U.S. Racing Hall of Fame inductee Ron McAnally, Hawkster won three Grade I races and earned $1,409,477 during his three years of racing.

Hawkster is the damsire of Afleet Alex, the 2005 Preakness and Belmont Stakes winner who was voted that year's American Champion Three-Year-Old Male Horse.
