= Afleet Alex =

American-bred Thoroughbred racehorse (2002–2026)

- Sire: Northern Afleet
- Grandsire: Afleet
- Dam: Maggy Hawk
- Damsire: Hawkster
- Sex: Stallion
- Foaled: May 9, 2002
- Died: February 6, 2026 (aged 23)
- Country: United States
- Colour: Bay
- Breeder: John Martin Silvertand
- Owner: Cash Is King Stable
- Trainer: Tim Ritchey
- Record: 12:8–2–1
- Earnings: $2,765,800

Major wins
- Hopeful Stakes (2004); Sanford Stakes (2004); Arkansas Derby (2005); Triple Crown race wins: Preakness Stakes (2005); Belmont Stakes (2005)

Awards
- U.S. Champion 3-Year-Old Male (2005); NTRA "Moment of the Year" (2005)

Afleet Alex (May 9, 2002 – February 6, 2026) was an American thoroughbred race horse who, in 2005, won two of America's classic races, the Preakness Stakes and the Belmont Stakes. He was owned by the Cash Is King Stable partnership, was trained by Tim Ritchey and ridden by Jeremy Rose. In twelve lifetime starts, Alex won eight times (six times in stakes, three times in G1 stakes), placed twice (both in G1 stakes), and came in third once (in the Kentucky Derby) over 12 starts, for lifetime earnings of $2,765,800.

== Background ==
Bred in Florida by John Martin Silvertand, Afleet Alex is out of the winning mare Maggy Hawk and counts multiple Grade 2-placed Unforgettable Max as a full brother. Maggy Hawk is by Hawkster, a world record holder on turf at a mile and a half. His maternal granddam is 1983 Demoiselle Stakes (G1) winner Qualique. Qualique was sired by Hawaii, a multiple grade one (G1) winner and marathon turf specialist. Also on his dam's side is Sir Gaylord, half-brother to Secretariat, who sired his fourth dam, Gaylord's Touch. Maggy Hawk has three foals of racing age, two runners, two winners and two stakes horses, including Afleet Alex. He was sired by Northern Afleet, a stakes winner from seven furlongs to nine furlongs, who was the son of the 1987 Canadian Horse of the Year, Afleet. Afleet was by the leading sire Mr. Prospector.

At the outset, Afleet Alex faced adversity: his mother became ill 24 hours after his birth and could no longer nurse him. She did supply him with colostrum (mother's first milk that is rich in antibodies and nutrients). Silvertrand's daughter Lauren (then nine) fed the colt from a Coors Light bottle the day after his mother became ill. He continued bottle feeding for twelve days until a nurse mare could be found. He was originally sold at auction as a yearling for $150,000. A year later the owner sold him in the Fasig-Tipton Midlantic May two-year-olds in training sale for $75,000.

Afleet Alex was named after his sire, Northern Afleet, and after the son of the principal owner (Chuck Zacney), who was named Alex. In part because three children of the ownership syndicate were named Alex or Alexandra, Alex's Lemonade Stand became the ownership group's charity, to which they donated a portion of the colt's winnings. Alex's Lemonade Stand was named for Alex Scott, a girl who started to raise money for pediatric cancer research prior to her own cancer death in 2004 at the age of eight. When John Silvertand was himself diagnosed with colon cancer, the managing partner of the Afleet Alex ownership syndicate, Chuck Zacney, made the announcement public, with the consent of Alex Scott's parents, and they encouraged racetracks to host Alex's Lemonade Stand fundraising efforts during race meets, which came to include the 2005 Preakness and Belmont Stakes.

Considered an ugly duckling as a youngster, Afleet Alex turned into a handsome bay stallion who reached 16 hands (64 inches, 163 cm) at maturity. While he has a commanding presence, Gainesway's sales director Michael Hermon has described him as being "like a big Labrador."

== Racing career ==
=== 2004: two-year-old season ===
As a two-year-old, Afleet Alex broke his maiden by 11 1/4 lengths on June 26, and then won an allowance race by a dozen lengths on July 12. He then won the Sanford Stakes at Saratoga on July 29 by 5 1/4 lengths in stakes record time. "This horse is a beast," said jockey Jeremy Rose. "He's classy enough to sit off the speed and take off. I really didn't have to do much with him, other than keep him out of trouble. I've been on decent horses before, but this one is special because of the way he runs. He is so athletic and professional. He does everything you ask him, whether it is in a workout or a race. It seems he has an unlimited amount of gears; that's why I think he can easily go longer." He then won the G1 Hopeful Stakes, finished second in the G1 Champagne Stakes and the G1 Breeders Cup Juvenile.

=== 2005: three-year-old season ===
Afleet Alex started his three-year-old campaign by winning the listed Mountain Valley Stakes at Oaklawn Park in a fast time of 1:09.52 for six furlongs. He then finished out of the money for the only time in his career in the Rebel Stakes under jockey John R. Velazquez, and was later found to be suffering from a lung infection. He returned to win the G2 Arkansas Derby by a record eight lengths under his regular jockey, Jeremy Rose. Rose hit his colt five times—"and I only did that because it was a million-dollar race, not because he needed it."

Coming off two strong wins and discarding his Rebel Stakes mishap, Afleet Alex was one of the favorites for the Kentucky Derby, run May 7, 2005. In the race, he finished third by less than a length to Giacomo, who was a 50–1 longshot. Rose later said that he had not given the horse the best ride of his life.

Two weeks later, Afleet Alex won the second leg of the Triple Crown of Thoroughbred Racing, the Preakness Stakes at Pimlico, leaving Giacomo third. In his Preakness victory, Scrappy T, who was in the lead, swung out at the top of the stretch as a result of an aggressive smack of his jockey Ramon Dominguez's whip. The horse veered into Afleet Alex's path just as he was making his move, and they clipped heels. Afleet Alex stumbled so badly that Jeremy Rose was thrown far over his neck. The horse nearly went to his knees, and his nose came within an inch of the dirt. However, he recovered and regained his momentum, drawing away from Scrappy T for a 4 3/4 length victory. "I think my heart stopped," Rose said. "I have no idea how I stayed on. I was basically hanging on in fear." He finished the mile and three-sixteenth distance of the Preakness in 1:55, the fastest Preakness of the past eight years, turning in one of the fastest final three-sixteenths in Preakness history.

On June 11, Afleet Alex rated behind the pace for a mile, then "exploded" past Giacomo and the rest of the field in the final turn at Belmont Park to win the Belmont Stakes by seven lengths. He ran the fastest final quarter (:24 2/5) in that race since Arts and Letters in 1969. He became the 18th horse to lose the Derby but win the Preakness and Belmont. "We expected this kind of performance," Ritchey said. "I wasn't surprised he was that far back, but when he got rolling, it was a lot of fun." Rose said, "I knew that if I didn't do something stupid, I was going to win this race. He's just that good."

When The Blood-Horse checked back over 40 years, there was no record found of any horse other than Alex having won the Belmont Stakes and a six-furlong stakes (the Mountain Valley) in the same year.

The colt's fall campaign was derailed when he was found in late July 2005 to have a hairline fracture in his left front cannon bone, near the ankle. The fracture was discovered very early, and the prognosis was good for Afleet Alex to return to his previous level of performance. Once fully healed, the colt returned to working for the Breeder's Cup Classic, putting in two bullet works. However, Tim Ritchey decided to take the conservative path with the colt and shelved him for the year. Later in the year, avascular necrosis (the dying of tissue in the bone, creating a brittle patch) was discovered and diagnosed. The necrosis was probably due to an undetected deep bruise sustained when Afleet Alex nearly fell in the Preakness. It is believed the necrosis caused his summer condylar fracture. Tim Ritchey and Cash is King Stable announced the horse's retirement from racing on December 1, 2005.

== Awards and assessment ==
Afleet Alex was runner-up for the 2004 Eclipse Champion Two-Year-Old Colt or Gelding award and won the Florida Two-Year-Old Champion Male that year.

In the 2005 World Thoroughbred Racehorse Rankings, Afleet Alex was the World's Top Ranked Three-Year-Old Intermediate Distance Horse. He was ninth place overall, with a rating of 124 for his Preakness, sharing that spot with Deep Impact (2005 Japanese Champion Three-Year-Old Colt and Horse of the Year), Bago (2004 Prix de l'Arc de Triomphe winner and 2004 Cartier Champion Three-Year-Old Male), Leroidesanimaux (2005 U.S. Champion Turf Male), and Starcraft on that ranking sheet, not far behind the top ranked horse and three-year-old. He was the 2005 Florida Champion Three-Year-Old Male and Horse of the Year.

In January 2006, he also won the Eclipse Award for 2005 Champion Three-Year-Old Male and finished second to Saint Liam in the Eclipse Award for Horse of the Year balloting. His victory in the 2005 Preakness Stakes was voted the National Thoroughbred Racing Association "Moment of the Year." Cash Is King Stable received a special Eclipse Award for its contributions to Alex's Lemonade Stand.

== Stud career ==
Afleet Alex entered stud in 2006 at Gainesway Farm in Lexington, Kentucky for an initial fee of $40,000. He has sired seven grade 1 winners, including:

- Texas Red (Breeders' Cup Juvenile)
- Materiality (Florida Derby)
- Sharla Rae (Del Mar Oaks)
- Afleet Express (Travers Stakes)
- Iotapa (Vanity Handicap)
- Afleet Again (Breeders' Cup Marathon)
- Dublin (Hopeful Stakes)

Afleet Alex has sired other graded stakes winners such as:

- Called To Serve (Discovery Handicap)
- Dancing Afleet (Delaware Oaks)
- Harissa (Barbara Fritchie Handicap)
- La Gran Bailadora (Kentucky Cup Distaff)

Internationally, Afleet Alex has sired Puerto Rico Champion Imported Colt and Gr.I winner Advier, Puerto Rico Gr.II winner Cuqui's Love, and the Japanese stakes winning mare Better Sweet.

Afleet Alex is the damsire (maternal grandfather) of 2019 Belmont Stakes winner Sir Winston, through his graded stakes winning daughter La Gran Bailadora.

== Stud retirement and death ==
Afleet Alex was retired from stallion duties on January 31, 2022, and continued to reside at Gainesway Farm. He died on February 6, 2026, at the age of 24. His death was announced by Gainesway on February 12.

== Pedigree ==
Pedigree of Afleet Alex, bay horse, foaled May 9, 2002
Sire Northern Afleet bay 1993	Afleet chestnut 1984	Mr. Prospector bay 1970	Raise a Native
Sire Northern Afleet bay 1993	Afleet chestnut 1984	Mr. Prospector bay 1970	Gold Digger
Sire Northern Afleet bay 1993	Afleet chestnut 1984	Polite Lady bay 1977	Venetian Jester
Sire Northern Afleet bay 1993	Afleet chestnut 1984	Polite Lady bay 1977	Friendly Ways
Sire Northern Afleet bay 1993	Nuryette bay 1986	Nureyev bay 1977	Northern Dancer
Sire Northern Afleet bay 1993	Nuryette bay 1986	Nureyev bay 1977	Special
Sire Northern Afleet bay 1993	Nuryette bay 1986	Stellarett bay 1978	Tentam
Sire Northern Afleet bay 1993	Nuryette bay 1986	Stellarett bay 1978	Square Angel
Dam Maggy Hawk bay 1994	Hawkster bay 1986	Silver Hawk bay 1979	Roberto
Dam Maggy Hawk bay 1994	Hawkster bay 1986	Silver Hawk bay 1979	Gris Vitesse
Dam Maggy Hawk bay 1994	Hawkster bay 1986	Strait Lane brown 1974	Chieftain
Dam Maggy Hawk bay 1994	Hawkster bay 1986	Strait Lane brown 1974	Level Sands
Dam Maggy Hawk bay 1994	Qualique bay 1981	Hawaii bay 1964	Utrillo
Dam Maggy Hawk bay 1994	Qualique bay 1981	Hawaii bay 1964	Ethane
Dam Maggy Hawk bay 1994	Qualique bay 1981	Dorothy Gaylord bay 1972	Sensitivo
Dam Maggy Hawk bay 1994	Qualique bay 1981	Dorothy Gaylord bay 1972	Gaylord's Touch
