= Timothy F. Ritchey =

American horse trainer

Tim Ritchey
Personal information
- Born: May 27, 1951 (age 75) Pittsburgh, Pennsylvania, U.S.
- Occupation: Trainer

Horse racing career
- Sport: Horse racing
- Career wins: 2,422+ (ongoing)

Major racing wins
- Maryland Breeders' Cup Sprint Handicap (1997); Philadelphia Park Breeders' Cup Handicap (1997); Pennsylvania Derby (1999); Federico Tesio Stakes (2001); Maryland Million Classic (2001, 2002, 2003); West Virginia Governor's Stakes (2002); Hopeful Stakes (2004); Sanford Stakes (2004); Arkansas Derby (2005); Bertram F. Bongard Stakes (2006); Delaware Oaks (2007); Royal North Stakes (2008); Hirsch Jacobs Stakes (2009) American Classic Race wins: Preakness Stakes (2005); Belmont Stakes (2005)

Racing awards
- Leading trainer at Delaware Park Racetrack (1992,1993,1994,1996, 2001)

Significant horses
- Docent, Afleet Alex, Smart Guy, Summer Bird

Timothy F. "Tim" Ritchey (born May 27, 1951, in Pittsburgh, Pennsylvania) is an American Thoroughbred racehorse trainer. He is best known as the trainer of Afleet Alex, a 2005 winner of two American Classic Races, the Preakness and Belmont Stakes.

Tim Ritchey married Janet Wood, a native of England. The couple has two sons, Christopher and Benjamin, who were born in Lebanon, Pennsylvania.
