= Giacomo (horse) =

American-bred Thoroughbred racehorse

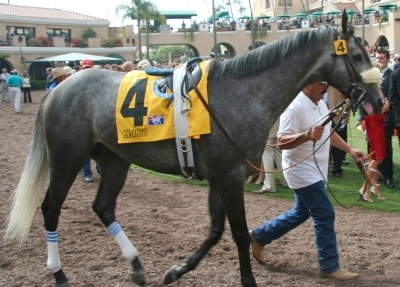
- Giacomo at the 2006 Pacific Classic
- Sire: Holy Bull
- Grandsire: Great Above
- Dam: Set Them Free
- Damsire: Stop The Music
- Sex: Stallion
- Foaled: February 16, 2002
- Country: USA
- Colour: Gray
- Breeder: Mr. & Mrs. Jerome S. Moss
- Owner: Mr. & Mrs. Jerome S. Moss/Stronach Stables
- Trainer: John Shirreffs
- Record: 16:3–2–5
- Earnings: $2,537,316

Major wins
- Kentucky Derby (2005); San Diego Handicap (2006)
- Last updated on November 9, 2006

Giacomo (foaled February 16, 2002 in Kentucky) is a champion American Thoroughbred racehorse who won the 2005 Kentucky Derby at 50–1 odds.

== Background ==
The gray stallion was owned by his breeder, Jerry Moss, who may be better known for co-founding A&M Records with trumpeter Herb Alpert. Giacomo was named after the son of Sting. Giacomo's dam Set Them Free also produced Tiago.

Giacomo was trained during his racing career by John Shirreffs.

== Racing career ==
Giacomo, ridden by Mike E. Smith, won the 2005 Kentucky Derby in a time of 2:02.75. At odds of 50–1, Giacomo stands as tied, with Mine That Bird in 2009, for the fourth-biggest longshot ever to win the Derby, trailing only Country House (horse), at 65–1 in 2019, Rich Strike at 80-1 in 2022, and Donerail, who went off at 91–1 in 1913. Giacomo's owner received a first-place check of $1,639,600 for the victory, the largest in Kentucky Derby history at the time, later surpassed in 2019 when the purse was increased to $3 million.

Giacomo finished third in the 2005 Preakness Stakes behind the favorite, Afleet Alex. He finished seventh in the 2005 Belmont Stakes, again behind the favored Afleet Alex; Smith said after the race that the horse had breathing problems.

Giacomo continued to race after his disappointing Belmont finish. In his first race back, he finished third in the Strub Stakes at Santa Anita Park. After that, he was raced in the prestigious Grade I Santa Anita Handicap, where he finished 5th and was never a threat. After a four-month layoff, Giacomo won the July 22, 2006, San Diego Handicap by a head. The victory was followed by a 5th in the Pacific Classic Stakes and a show in the Goodwood Breeders' Cup Handicap, where Giacomo lost to Lava Man for the 3rd time in 4 races. Despite the fact that Giacomo had only won two stakes races, he was entered in the 2006 Breeders' Cup Classic field, where he faced Lava Man as well as other top horses such as Bernardini and the eventual winner, Invasor. Giacomo finished fourth.

== Stud record ==
After the Breeders' Cup, it was announced that Giacomo would be retired to stud at Adena Springs in Kentucky.

In November 2015, Oakhurst Thoroughbreds announced Giacomo would stand at stud at their facility in Newberg, Oregon, making Giacomo the second Kentucky Derby winner to stand at stud in Oregon (along with Grindstone.)

As of January 3, 2024, Giacomo had sired 12 stakes winners from 431 foals of racing age, as per The Jockey Club data.

== Pedigree ==
Pedigree of Giacomo (USA), gray stallion, 2002
Sire Holy Bull (USA) 1991	Great Above (USA); 1972	Minnesota Mac	Rough'n Tumble
Sire Holy Bull (USA) 1991	Great Above (USA); 1972	Minnesota Mac	Cow Girl
Sire Holy Bull (USA) 1991	Great Above (USA); 1972	Ta Wee	Intentionally
Sire Holy Bull (USA) 1991	Great Above (USA); 1972	Ta Wee	Aspidistra
Sire Holy Bull (USA) 1991	Sharon Brown (USA); 1980	Al Hattab	The Axe
Sire Holy Bull (USA) 1991	Sharon Brown (USA); 1980	Al Hattab	Abyssinia
Sire Holy Bull (USA) 1991	Sharon Brown (USA); 1980	Agathea's Dawn	Grey Dawn
Sire Holy Bull (USA) 1991	Sharon Brown (USA); 1980	Agathea's Dawn	Agathea
Dam Set Them Free (USA) 1990	Stop The Music (USA); 1970	Hail To Reason	Turn-To
Dam Set Them Free (USA) 1990	Stop The Music (USA); 1970	Hail To Reason	Nothirdchance
Dam Set Them Free (USA) 1990	Stop The Music (USA); 1970	Bebopper	Tom Fool
Dam Set Them Free (USA) 1990	Stop The Music (USA); 1970	Bebopper	Bebop
Dam Set Them Free (USA) 1990	Valseuse (FR); 1973	Tyrant	Bold Ruler
Dam Set Them Free (USA) 1990	Valseuse (FR); 1973	Tyrant	Anadem
Dam Set Them Free (USA) 1990	Valseuse (FR); 1973	Barbarossa	Cambremont
Dam Set Them Free (USA) 1990	Valseuse (FR); 1973	Barbarossa	Barbara (Family: 2-d)
