= 1999 in sports =

1999 in sports describes the year's events in world sport.

== Alpine skiing ==
- Alpine Skiing World Cup
  - Men's overall season champion: Lasse Kjus, Norway
  - Women's overall season champion: Alexandra Meissnitzer, Austria

== American football ==
- Super Bowl XXXIII – the Denver Broncos (AFC) won 34–19 over the Atlanta Falcons (NFC)
  - Location: Pro Player Stadium
  - Attendance: 74,803
  - MVP: John Elway, QB (Denver)
- April 17 – Quarterback Tim Couch was selected by the Cleveland Browns with the first overall pick in the 1999 NFL draft.
- St. Louis Rams quarterback Kurt Warner named NFL MVP
- St. Louis Rams Head coach Dick Vermeil named NFL Coach of the Year
- Indianapolis Colts running back Edgerrin James named NFL Rookie of the Year
- Fiesta Bowl (1998 season):
  - The Tennessee Volunteers claimed the first ever BCS National Championship 23–16 over the Florida State Seminoles
- November 1 – death of Walter Payton (45), Chicago Bears running back

== Artistic gymnastics ==
- 1999 World Artistic Gymnastics Championships – held in Tianjin, China
  - Women's team champions: Romania
  - Women's all-around champion: Maria Olaru, Romania
  - Women's vault champion: Elena Zamolodchikova, Russian Federation
  - Women's floor exercise champion: Andreea Răducan, Romania
  - Women's uneven bars champion: Svetlana Khorkina, Russian Federation
  - Women's balance beam champion: Ling Jie, China
  - Men's team champions: China
  - Men's all-around champion: Nikolai Kryukov, Russian Federation
  - Men's horizontal bar champion: Jesús Carballo, Spain
  - Men's parallel bars champion: Lee Joo-hyung, South Korea
  - Men's pommel horse champion: Alexei Nemov, Russian Federation
  - Men's floor exercise champion: Alexei Nemov, Russian Federation
  - Men's still rings champion: Dong Zhen, China
  - Men's vault champion: Li Xiaopeng, China

== Association football ==
- Champions League – Manchester United F.C. defeated FC Bayern Munich 2 – 1 to win the treble having already won the English premiership and FA Cup.
- UEFA Cup – Parma F.C. defeated Olympique Marseille 3–0
- Copa Libertadores – Palmeiras defeated Deportivo Cali 4–3 after penalties
- Asian Club Championship – Júbilo Iwata defeated Esteghlal 2–1
- CAF Champions League – Raja Casablanca defeated Espérance 4–3 after penalties
- FIFA Women's World Cup – USA defeated China 5–4 after penalties.

== Athletics ==
- August – 1999 World Championships in Athletics held at Seville
- Hicham El Guerrouj set a new world record for the mile. He recorded a time of 3:43.13, barely edging out Noah Ngeny who recorded 3:43.40.
- Michael Johnson set a new world record in the 400 metres in 43.18.

== Baseball ==
- May 10 – The Boston Red Sox defeated the Seattle Mariners, 12–4, as shortstop Nomar Garciaparra hit three home runs, including two grand slams; one in the first inning, and one in the eighth. Nomar was the 9th in MLB history (the first since Robin Ventura in 1995) to hit two grand slams in the same game, and the first Red Sox player to accomplish the feat since Jim Tabor in 1939.
- July 18 – David Cone pitched a perfect game, the 16th in history, as the Yankees defeated the Montreal Expos, 6–0, to celebrate Yogi Berra Day.
- Texas Rangers Catcher Iván Rodríguez named AL MVP
- Atlanta Braves 3B Chipper Jones named NL MVP
- Kansas City Royals OF Carlos Beltrán named AL Rookie of the Year
- Cincinnati Reds Pitcher Scott Williamson named NL Rookie of the Year
- World Series – New York Yankees won 4 games to 0 over the Atlanta Braves. The series MVP: Mariano Rivera, New York
- Miami Hurricanes defeated Florida State Seminoles in the College World Series

== Basketball ==
- 1999 NBA Finals – the San Antonio Spurs defeated the New York Knicks, 4 games to 1, to win the franchise's first championship. The Spurs also became the first former ABA team to win an NBA title, while the Knicks were the first number eight seed in NBA history to make it to the NBA Finals. This season also marked the beginning of both the Spurs dynasty and the Tim Duncan era, who would win 4 more championships in the next 15 years.
- Utah Jazz forward Karl Malone named NBA MVP for the second time in his career
- Toronto Raptors guard/forward Vince Carter named NBA Rookie of the Year
- NCAA Men's Basketball Championship –
  - Connecticut won 77–74 over Duke
- Duke Blue Devils forward Elton Brand named Naismith College Player of the Year & John R. Wooden Award
- WNBA Finals – The Houston Comets defeated the New York Liberty, 2 games to 1, to win their third title in a row.
- National Basketball League (Australia) Finals:
  - Adelaide 36ers defeated the Victoria Titans 2–1 in the best–of–three final series.

== Boxing ==
- July 31 to August 8 – Pan American Games held at Winnipeg
- August 20 to 27 – 1999 World Amateur Boxing Championships held at Houston
- September 18 – The Fight of the Millennium:
  - Félix Trinidad defeated Oscar De La Hoya by split 12-round decision to unify the IBF and WBC's world Welterweight championships.

== Canadian football ==
- Grey Cup – Hamilton Tiger-Cats won 32–21 over the Calgary Stampeders
- Vanier Cup – Laval Rouge et Or won 14–10 over the Saint Mary's Huskies

== Cricket ==
- Cricket World Cup Final: Australia defeated Pakistan by eight wickets
- Playing for Himachal Pradesh against Jammu and Kashmir in the Ranji Trophy, Rajiv Nayyar became the first and only player in first-class cricket history to bat for over 1,000 minutes in an innings, and scored 271 in 1,015 minutes.

== Curling ==
- World Curling Championships –
  - Men: Scotland won 6–5 over Canada
  - Women: Sweden won 8–5 over USA

== Cycling ==
- Giro d'Italia won by Ivan Gotti of Italy
- Tour de France – Lance Armstrong of the United States
- UCI Road World Championships – Men's road race – Óscar Freire of Spain

== Dogsled racing ==
- Iditarod Trail Sled Dog Race Champion –
  - Doug Swingley with lead dogs: Stormy, Cola & Elmer

== Field hockey ==
- Men's Champions Trophy: Australia
- Women's Champions Trophy: Australia

== Figure skating ==
- World Figure Skating Championship –
  - Men's champion: Alexei Yagudin, Russia
  - Ladies' champion: Maria Butyrskaya, Russia
  - Pairs' champions: Yelena Berezhnaya & Anton Sikharulidze, Russia
  - Ice dancing champions: Anjelika Krylova & Oleg Ovsyannikov, Russia
- European Figure Skating Championships –
  - Men's champion: Alexei Yagudin, Russia
  - Ladies' champion: Maria Butyrskaya, Russia
  - Pairs' champions: Maria Petrova & Alexei Tikhonov, Russia
  - Ice dancing champions: Anjelika Krylova & Oleg Ovsyannikov, Russia

== Floorball ==
- Women's World Floorball Championships
  - Champion: Finland
- European Cup
  - Men's champion: Warberg IC
  - Women's champion: Tapanilan Erä

== Gaelic Athletic Association ==
- Camogie
  - All–Ireland Camogie Champion: Tipperary
  - National Camogie League: Cork
- Gaelic football
  - All-Ireland Senior Football Championship – Meath 1–11 defeated Cork 1–8
  - National Football League – Cork 0–12 defeated Dublin 1–7
- Ladies' Gaelic football
  - All–Ireland Senior Football Champion: Mayo
  - National Football League: Monaghan
- Hurling
  - All-Ireland Senior Hurling Championship – Cork 0–13 defeated Kilkenny 0–12
  - National Hurling League – Tipperary 1-14 defeated Galway 1–10

== Golf ==
- October 25 – death of Payne Stewart (42) in an air accident

Men's professional

- Masters Tournament – José María Olazábal
- U.S. Open – Payne Stewart
- British Open – Paul Lawrie. This Open is also remembered for the epic collapse of French golfer Jean van de Velde, who threw away a three–shot lead on the final hole, finding himself in a playoff which Lawrie won.
- PGA Championship – Tiger Woods
- PGA Tour money leader – Tiger Woods – $6,616,585
- PGA Tour Player of the Year – Tiger Woods
- PGA Tour Rookie of the Year – Carlos Franco
- Senior PGA Tour money leader – Bruce Fleisher – $2,515,705
- Ryder Cup – United States won 14½ to 13½ over Europe in team golf.

Men's amateur

- British Amateur – Graeme Storm
- U.S. Amateur – David Gossett
- European Amateur – Grégory Havret

Women's professional

- Nabisco Dinah Shore – Dottie Pepper
- LPGA Championship – Juli Inkster
- U.S. Women's Open – Juli Inkster
- Classique du Maurier – Karrie Webb
- LPGA Tour money leader – Karrie Webb – $1,591,959

== Handball ==
- 1999 World Men's Handball Championship – won by Sweden
- 1999 World Women's Handball Championship – won by Norway

== Harness racing ==
- North America Cup – The Panderosa
- United States Pacing Triple Crown races –
  1. Cane Pace – Blissful Hall
  2. Little Brown Jug – Blissful Hall
  3. Messenger Stakes – Blissful Hall
- United States Trotting Triple Crown races –
  1. Hambletonian – Self Possessed
  2. Yonkers Trot – CR Renegade
  3. Kentucky Futurity – Self Possessed
- Australian Inter Dominion Harness Racing Championship –
  - Pacers: Sir Vancelot
  - Trotters: Special Force

== Horse racing ==
Steeplechases

- Cheltenham Gold Cup – See More Business
- Grand National – Bobbyjo

Flat races

- Australia – Melbourne Cup won by Rogan Josh
- Canada – Queen's Plate won by Woodcarver
- Dubai – Dubai World Cup won by Almutawakel
- France – Prix de l'Arc de Triomphe won by Montjeu
- Ireland – Irish Derby Stakes won by Montjeu
- Japan – Japan Cup won by Special Week
- English Triple Crown races:
  1. 2000 Guineas Stakes – Island Sands
  2. The Derby – Oath
  3. St Leger Stakes – Mutafaweq
- United States Triple Crown races:
  1. Kentucky Derby – Charismatic
  2. Preakness Stakes – Charismatic
  3. Belmont Stakes – Lemon Drop Kid
- Breeders' Cup World Thoroughbred Championships:
  1. Breeders' Cup Classic – Cat Thief
  2. Breeders' Cup Distaff – Beautiful Pleasure
  3. Breeders' Cup Filly & Mare Turf – Soaring Softly (inaugural running of this race)
  4. Breeders' Cup Juvenile – Anees
  5. Breeders' Cup Juvenile Fillies – Cash Run
  6. Breeders' Cup Mile – Silic
  7. Breeders' Cup Sprint – Artax
  8. Breeders' Cup Turf – Daylami

== Ice hockey ==
- February 13: Last ice hockey game played at the historic Maple Leaf Gardens in Toronto, the game was a 6–2 loss for the Toronto Maple Leafs to Chicago Blackhawks.
- Wayne Gretzky played his last NHL game on April 18, 1999, at Madison Square Garden where the New York Rangers lost 2–1 in overtime to the Pittsburgh Penguins
- Art Ross Trophy as the NHL's leading scorer during the regular season: Jaromir Jagr, Pittsburgh Penguins
- Hart Memorial Trophy for the NHL's Most Valuable Player:
  - Jaromir Jagr – Pittsburgh Penguins
- Stanley Cup – Dallas Stars defeated the Buffalo Sabres 4 games to 2, Conn Smythe Trophy – Joe Nieuwendyk. The Stars became the first team from the Southern United States to win the Cup.
- World Hockey Championship
  - Men's champion: Czech Republic defeated Finland
  - Junior Men's champion: Russia defeated Canada
  - Women's champion: Canada defeated the United States
- NCAA men's ice hockey championship – University of Maine Black Bears defeated University of New Hampshire Wildcats 3–2 in overtime

== Lacrosse ==
- Major League Lacrosse (MLL) was founded by Jake Steinfeld, Dave Morrow and Tim Robertson.
- The Toronto Rock beat the Rochester Knighthawks 13–10 and won the National Lacrosse League Championship.
- The Victoria Shamrocks won the Mann Cup.
- The Edmonton Miners won the Founders Cup.
- The Whitby Warriors won the Minto Cup.

== Mixed martial arts ==
The following is a list of major noteworthy MMA events during 1999 in chronological order.

| Date | Event | Alternate name/s | Location | Attendance | PPV buyrate | Notes |
| January 8 | UFC 18: The Road to the Heavyweight Title | —N/a | New Orleans, Louisiana, United States | —N/a | —N/a | This event featured the American debut of Bas Rutten, who previously fought exclusively for Pancrase in Japan. |
| March 5 | UFC 19: Ultimate Young Guns | —N/a | Bay St. Louis, Mississippi, United States | —N/a | —N/a | Following the main event, Tito Ortiz insulted the Lion's Den team. This led to a long rivalry between Ortiz and Ken Shamrock. |
| April 29 | Pride 5 | —N/a | Nagoya, Japan | —N/a | —N/a | First Pride FC event to be promoted by Dream Stage Entertainment, who took over Kakutougi Revolution Spirits. |
| May 7 | UFC 20: Battle for the Gold | —N/a | Birmingham, Alabama, United States | —N/a | —N/a | —N/a |
| July 4 | Pride 6 | —N/a | Yokohama, Japan | —N/a | —N/a | Event featured seven MMA bouts and one karate bout between Hiroki Kurosawa and Nobuaki Kakuda. |
| July 16 | UFC 21: Return of the Champions | —N/a | Cedar Rapids, Iowa, United States | —N/a | —N/a | UFC rule change, Introduction of five-minute rounds. preliminary bouts consist of two rounds, non-title bouts consist of three rounds, and title bouts consist of five rounds. Introduction of 10-point must system. |
| September 12 | Pride 7 | —N/a | Yokohama, Japan | 10,031 | —N/a | —N/a |
| September 24 | UFC 22: Only One Can be Champion | —N/a | Lake Charles, Louisiana, United States | —N/a | —N/a | Following this event, UFC parent company SEG stopped releasing events on home video until UFC 30 with new owners Zuffa. |
| November 19 | UFC 23: Ultimate Japan 2 | —N/a | Tokyo, Japan | —N/a | —N/a | This event featured a four man "Japanese" tournament, held to crown the first ever UFC Japan Champion. The tournament was the first in the UFC since UFC 17, and the last tournament held by the UFC. |
| November 21 | Pride 8 | —N/a | Tokyo, Japan | —N/a | —N/a | —N/a |

== Radiosport ==
- First IARU Region II Amateur Radio Direction Finding Championships held in Portland, Oregon, United States. This was the first IARU sanctioned international ARDF competition in the Americas.
- Third High Speed Telegraphy World Championship held in Pordenone, Italy.

== Rugby league ==
- April 23 at Sydney, Australia – 1999 ANZAC test match was won by Australia 20–14 against New Zealand at Stadium Australia before 30,245.
- June 23 at Brisbane, Australia – 1999 State of Origin was retained by Queensland after the third and deciding match of the series was drawn 10 – 10 with New South Wales.
- September 19 in Australia – last game of the 1999 Telstra Premiership was played, including the final NRL matches as stand alone entities for the Balmain Tigers and Western Suburbs Magpies who later merged to form the Wests Tigers.
- September 26 at Sydney, Australia – 1999 NRL season culminated in the Melbourne Storm's 20 – 18 win against the St George Illawarra Dragons in the grand final
- October 9 at Manchester, England – Super League IV culminated in St. Helens' 8 – 6 win against the Bradford Bulls in the grand final.
- November 1 at Auckland, New Zealand – 1999 Tri–Nations culminated in Australia's 22 – 20 win against New Zealand in the final.

== Rugby union ==
- 105th Five Nations Championship series, the last under the Five Nations format, was won by Scotland. The modern Six Nations format was established the following year with the addition of Italy.
- Bledisloe Cup – Australia retained the cup after drawing the two-match series with New Zealand.
- Rugby World Cup: Australia defeated France 35–12 in the final, and became the first nation to win the Webb Ellis Cup twice.
- Tri Nations – New Zealand

== Snooker ==
- World Snooker Championship – Stephen Hendry defeated Mark Williams 18–11
- World rankings – John Higgins remained world number one for 1999/2000

== Swimming ==
- Fourth World Short Course Championships, held in Hong Kong, China (April 1–4)
  - Australia won the most medals (27), and the most gold medals (9)
- 24th European LC Championships, held in Istanbul, Turkey (July 26 – August 1)
  - Germany won the most medals (23), and the most gold medals (11)
- XIII Pan American Games, held in Winnipeg, Manitoba, Canada (August 2–7)
- Eighth Pan Pacific Championships, held in Sydney, Australia (August 22–29)
- Third European SC Championships, held in Lisbon, Portugal (December 9–12)
  - Germany won the most medals (26), Sweden won the most gold medals (9)
- February 17 – Australia's Susie O'Neill snapped the oldest world record in the books, as she clocked 2:05.37 in the women's 200m butterfly (short course) at a World Cup meet in Malmö, Sweden. The old mark, set by Mary T. Meagher on January 2, 1981, stood at 2:05.65.
- September 2 – Susie O'Neill broke her own world record in the women's 200m butterfly (short course) at a meet in Canberra, Australia, as she clocked 2:04.43

== Taekwondo ==
- World Championships held in Edmonton, Alberta, Canada

== Tennis ==
- Grand Slam in tennis men's results:
  1. Australian Open – Yevgeny Kafelnikov
  2. French Open – Andre Agassi
  3. Wimbledon championships – Pete Sampras
  4. U.S. Open – Andre Agassi
- Grand Slam in tennis women's results:
  1. Australian Open – Martina Hingis
  2. French Open – Steffi Graf
  3. Wimbledon championships – Lindsay Davenport
  4. U.S. Open – Serena Williams
- Davis Cup – Australia won 3–2 over France in world tennis.
- Kim Clijsters made her WTA Tour debut.

== Volleyball ==
- Men's World League: Italy
- Women's World Grand Prix: Russia
- Men's European Championship: Italy
- Women's European Championship: Russia

== Water polo ==
- Men's European Championship: Hungary
- Men's World Cup: Hungary
- Women's European Championship: Italy
- Women's World Cup: Netherlands

== Multi-sport events ==
- 13th Pan American Games held in Winnipeg, Manitoba, Canada
- Seventh All–Africa Games held in Johannesburg, South Africa
- Winter Asian Games held in Gangwon, South Korea
- Ninth Pan Arab Games held in Amman, Jordan
- 20th Southeast Asian Games held in Bandar Seri Begawan, Brunei Darussalam
- 20th Summer Universiade held on Palma de Mallorca, Spain
- 19th Winter Universiade held in Poprad, Slovakia

== Awards ==
- Associated Press Male Athlete of the Year – Tiger Woods, PGA golf
- Associated Press Female Athlete of the Year – United States women's national soccer team, soccer
