= Al Michaels =

American sportscaster (born 1944)

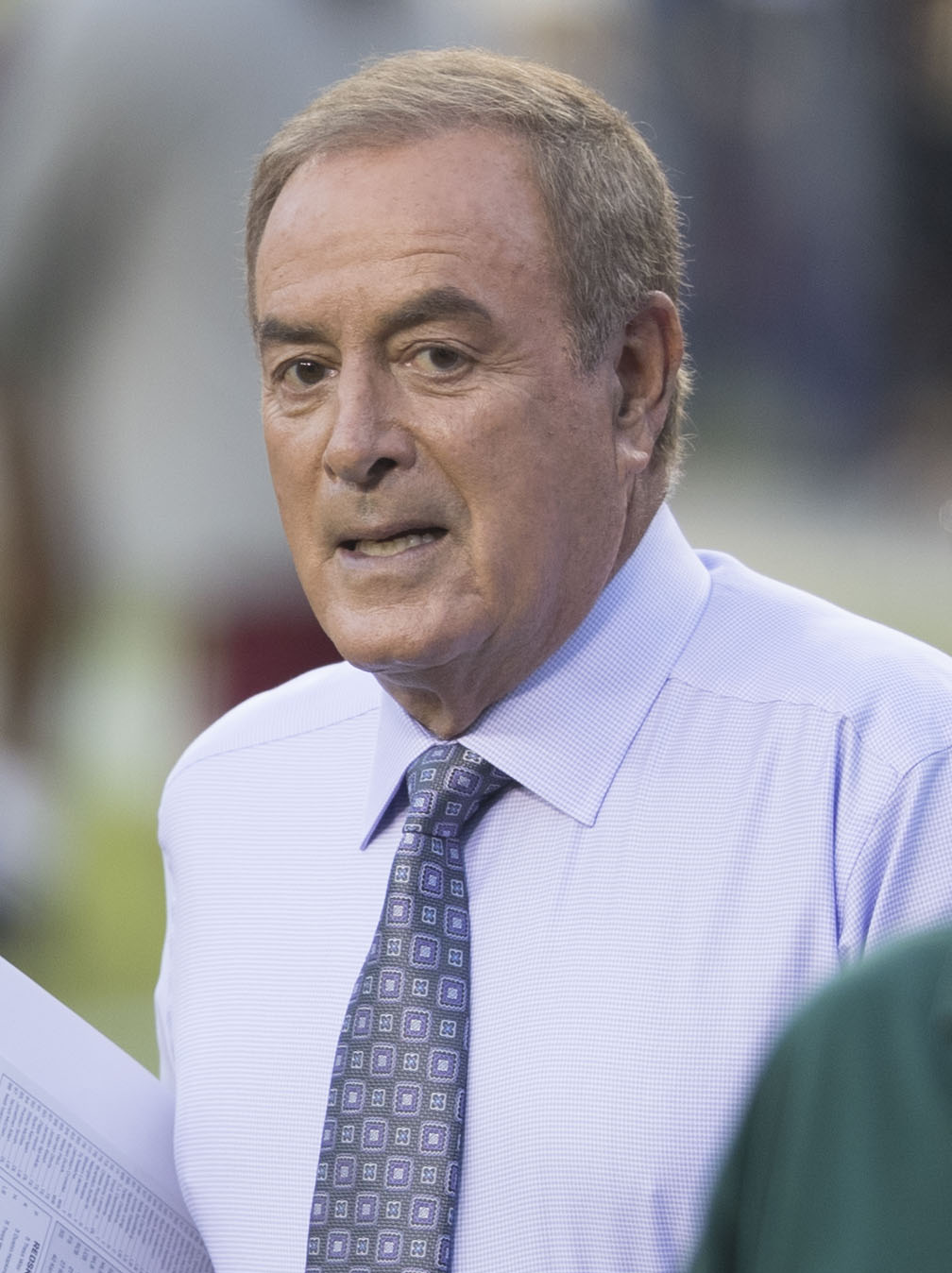
- Michaels in 2017
- Born: Alan Richard Michaels; November 12, 1944 (age 82); Brooklyn, New York City, U.S.
- Education: Arizona State University
- Occupation: Sports commentator
- Years active: 1964–present
- Spouse: Linda Anne Stamaton (m. 1966)
- Children: 2
- Sports commentary career
- Genre: Play-by-play
- Sports: Football; baseball; basketball; ice hockey; horse racing; boxing
- Employer: Amazon Prime Video (2022–present); ABC Sports (1976–2006); NBC Sports (1971–74, 2006–2023); CBS Sports (1975)

Alan Richard Michaels (born November 12, 1944) is an American television play-by-play sportscaster for Thursday Night Football. Having worked on network sports television since 1971, Michaels is best known for his many years calling play-by-play of National Football League (NFL) games, including ABC Monday Night Football from 1986 to 2005, NBC Sunday Night Football from 2006 to 2021, and eleven Super Bowls. He is also known for famous calls in other sports, including the Miracle on Ice at the 1980 Winter Olympics and the earthquake-interrupted Game 3 of the 1989 World Series, which was played in San Francisco.

== Early life and education ==
Alan Richard Michaels was born on November 12, 1944, in Brooklyn, New York City, New York. Michaels was born to a Jewish family in Brooklyn, New York, to Jay Leonard Michaels and Lila Roginsky/Ross. He grew up as a Brooklyn Dodgers fan. In 1958, Michaels's family moved to Los Angeles, the same year the Dodgers left Brooklyn. He graduated from Alexander Hamilton High School in 1962. Michaels attended Arizona State University, where he majored in radio and television and minored in journalism. He worked as a sports writer for ASU's independent student newspaper, The State Press, and called Sun Devils football, basketball, and baseball games for the campus radio station. He also is a member of Sigma Nu fraternity.

=== Early career ===
Michaels's first job in television was with Chuck Barris Productions, choosing women to appear on The Dating Game. His first sportscasting job came in 1967, when he was hired to do public relations for the Los Angeles Lakers and serve as a color commentator on the team's radio broadcasts alongside veteran play-by-play announcer Chick Hearn. However, he was terminated after appearing on just four games due to Chick Hearn's displeasure on working with someone so young.

He resumed his broadcasting career in 1968 after moving to Honolulu, where he worked as a sports anchor for KHVH-TV (now KITV) and called play-by-play for the Hawaii Islanders baseball team in the Pacific Coast League as well as the University of Hawaiʻi's football and basketball teams and local high school football games. He was named Hawaii's 'Sportscaster of the Year' in 1969.

In 1971, Michaels moved to Cincinnati, where he became the radio play-by-play announcer for the Cincinnati Reds of Major League Baseball. In 1972, after the Reds won the National League Championship Series and advanced to the World Series, he helped to cover the Fall Classic for NBC Sports. He also was the network's play-by-play man for the hockey coverage at the 1972 Winter Olympics in Sapporo, Japan.

In 1974, he left the Reds for a similar position with the San Francisco Giants and also covered basketball for UCLA, replacing Dick Enberg on the Bruins' tape delayed telecasts of their home games, during a period when UCLA was in the midst of an 88-game winning streak. He left NBC that year and announced regional NFL games for CBS Sports in 1975. In 1976 he joined ABC Sports part-time to call the network's backup Monday Night Baseball games.

== ABC Sports (1977–2006) ==
In January 1977, Michaels signed with ABC Sports on a full-time basis. In 1983, he became the network's lead baseball announcer, replacing Keith Jackson. Michaels and Jackson had split play–by–play duties for ABC's coverage of the World Series beginning in 1979, with Michaels assigned to call the games from the National League park and Jackson calling games from the American League park.

Over the next three decades, Michaels covered a wide variety of sports for ABC, including Major League Baseball, college football (working alongside the likes of Frank Broyles, Lee Grosscup, and Ara Parseghian from 1977–1985 and later, his Monday Night Football colleagues Frank Gifford and Dan Dierdorf for the Sugar Bowl from 1989 to 1992), college basketball (normally teaming with Joe B. Hall from 1987–1989), the Indianapolis 500, ice hockey, track and field events, horse racing (including the Kentucky Derby, Preakness Stakes, and Belmont Stakes from 1986 to 2000), golf, boxing (such as the 1985 Marvin Hagler/Thomas Hearns fight), figure skating (working alongside Dick Button and Peggy Fleming), road cycling (Michaels in particular, provided commentary for those events at the 1984 Summer Olympics with Greg LeMond and Eric Heiden), and many events of the Olympic Games as well as the Olympic trials.

Other prominent events that Michaels covered for ABC included serving as the studio host for the Stanley Cup Final from 2000–2002. Also, he served as host for the yearly Tiger Woods Monday night specials that aired in July or August.

=== The Miracle on Ice ===
Michaels's famous broadcasts include the 1980 Winter Olympics ice hockey medal round match between the United States and the Soviet Union.

In 1980, a group of college ice hockey players from the United States won the gold medal at the Olympic Winter Games. The medal round match on February 22—which, contrary to popular belief, did not yet assure the team of the gold medal—was of particular interest, as it was played against a heavily favored professional squad from the Soviet Union, and was in front of an incredibly excited pro-American crowd in Lake Placid, New York. Michaels's memorable broadcast of this game, including his interjection—"Do you believe in miracles? YES!"—as time expired on the 4–3 United States victory, earned the game the media nickname of The Miracle on Ice.

Most assume that the game was broadcast live; but in reality, the game started at 5:05 p.m. Eastern Standard Time and ABC decided against pre-empting local and network news (on the East Coast) to carry the game live. Instead, most of it—including the entire third period—was broadcast within the regularly scheduled, prime-time telecast from 8:30 to 11 p.m. Eastern time. Despite being on tape, the game was one of the highest-rated programs of the 1979–80 television season and remains the most-watched ice hockey game in the history of American television.

Michaels, along with broadcasting partner Ken Dryden, recreated their Olympic commentary in the 2004 film Miracle. The closing seconds of the game against the Soviet Union used the original ABC Sports commentary from 1980. Gavin O'Connor, the director of Miracle, decided to use the last 10 seconds of Michaels's original "Do you believe in miracles? YES!" call in the film because he felt he could not ask him to recreate the emotion he experienced at that moment.

Michaels later recalled, "When I look back, obviously Lake Placid would be the highlight of my career. I can't think of anything that would ever top it. I can't dream up a scenario."

Michaels was only on this particular assignment because he had done one hockey game, eight years prior. The game in question was the gold medal game (the Soviet Union vs. Czechoslovakia) of the 1972 Winter Olympics (on NBC) in Sapporo, Japan. Other announcers on the ABC Sports roster such as Keith Jackson, Frank Gifford, and Howard Cosell had never done a hockey game before. Michaels recalled this during a Real Sports interview in January 2009. Michaels also apparently beat out WABC-AM and New York Islanders commentator George Michael for the assignment.

Two days later, Michaels broadcast the gold medal game, in which the United States defeated Finland, closing the game out by declaring "This impossible dream comes true!"

Michaels continued as ABC's lead play-by-play announcer for their ice hockey coverage for their next two Winter Olympics, both with Dryden, the lead color commentator.

Michaels along with John Davidson would later call Games 1 and 4 of the Calgary–Los Angeles Stanley Cup playoff series in 1993 for ABC.

=== Memorable baseball moments ===
==== 1972 National League Championship Series ====
In the 1972 National League Championship Series, the defending World Series Champion Pittsburgh Pirates faced the Cincinnati Reds. In Game 5, with both teams tied at two games, the Pirates led 3–2 in the bottom of the ninth inning and were three outs away from advancing to the World Series. But Pirates closer Dave Giusti unraveled. He surrendered a game-tying home run to Johnny Bench before allowing back-to-back singles to Tony Pérez and Denis Menke before being relieved by Bob Moose, who almost worked out of the jam by recording two outs.

One and two ... The wind ... And the pitch to Bench ... Change hit in the air to deep right field, back goes Clemente ...! At the fence ...! She's gone! Johnny Bench, who hits almost every home run to left field hits one to right. The game is tied.

But with pinch-hitter Hal McRae at the plate, Moose lost his footing and uncorked a wild pitch sending George Foster, who was pinch running for Pérez, home with the pennant-clinching run and setting off a massive celebration at Riverfront Stadium.

The stretch ... And the 1–1 pitch to McRae ... In the dirt—it's a wild pitch! Here comes Foster! The Reds win the pennant! Bob Moose throws a wild pitch and the Reds have won the National League Pennant!

— Al Michaels's call on the series-ending play.

Later that October, Michaels participated in his first ever World Series as a broadcaster, where he assisted NBC's Curt Gowdy for Games 1–2, 6, and 7 in Cincinnati. Michaels was a product of the then broadcasting policy of announcers who represented the participating teams (a process that ended following the 1976 World Series) being invited to do televised network play–by–play for the World Series.

==== 1983 World Series ====
On June 6, 1983, Michaels succeeded Keith Jackson as the lead play-by-play announcer for Monday Night Baseball. Michaels, who spent seven seasons working backup games (initially teaming with Bob Gibson and Norm Cash), was apparently very miffed over ABC Sports' delay in announcing him as its top baseball announcer. Unlike Jackson, whose forte was college football, Michaels as previously mentioned, had gigs with the Cincinnati Reds and San Francisco Giants before joining ABC in 1976.

==== 1986 American League Championship Series ====
In 1986, Michaels was also on hand for what he says was "the greatest of all the thousands of games I've done." On October 12 at Anaheim Stadium, Michaels along with Jim Palmer called Game 5 of the American League Championship Series. The California Angels held a 3 games to 1 lead of a best-of-seven against the Boston Red Sox. In the game, the Angels held a 5–2 lead going into the ninth inning. Boston scored two runs on a home run by Don Baylor, closing the gap to 5–4.

When Donnie Moore came in to shut down the rally, there were two outs, and a runner on first base, Rich Gedman, who had been hit by a pitch. The Angels were one out from their first-ever trip to the World Series. But Dave Henderson hit a 2–2 pitch off Moore for a home run, giving the Red Sox a 6–5 lead. The Angels were able to score a run in the bottom of the ninth, pushing the game into extra innings. Moore continued to pitch for the Angels. He was able to stifle a 10th inning Red Sox rally by getting Jim Rice to ground into a double play. Nevertheless, the Red Sox were able to score off Moore in the 11th-inning via a sacrifice fly by Henderson. The Angels could not score in the bottom of the 11th and lost the game 7–6.

To left field, and deep, and Downing goes back ... and it's gone! Unbelievable!!!!!

— Al Michaels's call of Dave Henderson's 9th inning home run in game 5 of the 1986 ALCS.

The defeat still left the Angels in a 3 games to 2 advantage, with two more games to play at Fenway Park. The Angels were not able to recover, losing both games by wide margins, 10–4 and 8–1. Game 7 of the 1986 ALCS ended with Calvin Schiraldi striking out Jerry Narron.

The Red Sox can go from last rites to the World Series ... and they do!

— Al Michaels's call of Calvin Schiraldi's final strikeout in Game 7 of the 1986 ALCS.

Despite the fact that ABC Sports and ESPN have been under the same corporate umbrella (The Walt Disney Company) since 1996, Michaels never served as a regular commentator for ESPN Major League Baseball. The only time that Michaels appeared in an ESPN booth of any kind was as a guest commentator on Wednesday Night Baseball in 2003 as part of ESPN's Living Legends Series. Michaels joined Gary Thorne and Joe Morgan, whom he worked with on ABC's 1989 World Series coverage and served as ABC's #2 baseball team behind Michaels, Jim Palmer and Tim McCarver in 1989, for a game at Dodger Stadium between the Los Angeles Dodgers and Cincinnati Reds.

==== 1987 World Series ====
In a February 2015 interview, Michaels alleged that the Minnesota Twins pumped artificial crowd noise into the Metrodome during the 1987 World Series against the St. Louis Cardinals. Responding to Michaels's theory, Twins President Dave St. Peter said that he did not think the Twins needed "conspiracy theories" in order to win the World Series. Instead, he argued that "appreciation and respect" should be paid to players like Frank Viola, Gary Gaetti, Kent Hrbek, and Kirby Puckett, who, he said, "came out of nowhere to win a championship."

To Gaetti ... for the first time ever, the Minnesota Twins are the World Champions!

— Al Michaels calling the final out of Game 7 of the 1987 World Series on ABC.

==== 1989 World Series ====
On October 17, 1989, Michaels was in San Francisco, preparing to cover the third game of the 1989 World Series between the home team, the San Francisco Giants, and the visiting Oakland Athletics. ABC's network telecast began with a recap of the first two games (to the soundtrack of James Taylor's "Hello Old Friend"), both won by Oakland. Soon after Michaels handed off to his broadcast partner, Tim McCarver, who started assessing the Giants' chances for victory in the game, the Loma Prieta earthquake struck (at approximately 5:04 p.m. local time). While the network feed was breaking up due to the shaking, Michaels exclaimed "I'll tell you what, we're having an earth —", and at that moment, the feed completely broke up before he could finish his sentence. ABC then put up a green "World Series" telop graphic card on the screen for technical difficulties and restored audio via a telephone link 15 seconds later. Michaels quipped, "Well folks, that's the greatest open in the history of television, bar none!" Michaels then reported from the ABC Sports production truck outside Candlestick Park on the earthquake, for which he later was nominated for an Emmy Award for news broadcasting. Michaels relayed his reports to Ted Koppel, who was stationed at the ABC News bureau in Washington, D.C.

According to Tim McCarver, when the earthquake hit, he, Michaels and Jim Palmer immediately grabbed hold of what they perceived to be the armrests. In reality, the announcers were clutching on each other's thighs and they were each left with bruises the next day. Years later (on a 1999 SportsCenter retrospective about the 1989 World Series earthquake), Michaels would boldly admit his strong belief that had the earthquake lasted much longer than 15 seconds, he would have been killed. Michaels added that the only time that he really had been scared during the earthquake was when he moved in a position which he perceived to be backward. The three announcers were sitting on a ledge with their backs turned and no bracing behind them.

At this very moment ten days ago, we began our telecast with an aerial view of San Francisco; always a spectacular sight, and particularly so on that day because the cloudless sky of October 17 was ice blue, and the reflections of the late-day sun sparkled like a thousand jewels.

That picture was very much a mirror of the feel and the mood that had enveloped the Bay Area and indeed most of Northern California. Their baseball teams, the Giants and the Athletics, had won pennants, and the people of this region were still basking in the afterglow of each team's success. And this great American sporting classic, the World Series, was, for the time being, exclusively theirs.

Then, of course, that feeling of pure radiance was transformed into horror and grief and despair in fifteen seconds. And now on October 27, like a fighter who's taken a vicious blow to the stomach and has groggily arisen, this region moves on and moves ahead.

And one part of that scenario is the resumption of the World Series. No one in this ballpark tonight- no player, no vendor, no fan, no writer, no announcer, in fact, no one in this area period- can forget the images. The column of smoke in the Marina. The severed bridge. The grotesque tangle of concrete in Oakland. The pictures are embedded in our minds.

And while the mourning and the agonizing and the aftereffects continue, in about thirty minutes the plate umpire, Vic Voltaggio will say 'Play Ball', and the players will play, the vendors will sell, the crowd will exhort, the announcers will announce. And for many of the six million people in this region, it will be like revisiting Fantasyland.

But Fantasyland is where baseball comes from anyway, and maybe, right about now, that's the perfect place for a three-hour rest.

— Al Michaels at the beginning of ABC's telecast of the resumption of Game 3 of the 1989 World Series.

There was later speculation that if Michaels won an arbitration case involving ABC, he would join CBS Sports as its lead baseball announcer. ABC following the 1989 World Series, had lost its baseball package to CBS for the next four years. Michaels had been feuding with ABC over an alleged violation of company policy. Michaels's contract with ABC was originally set to expire in late 1992. Ultimately however, ABC announced a contract extension that sources said would keep Michaels at ABC through at least the end of 1995 and would pay him at least $2.2 million annually with the potential to earn more. That would make Michaels the highest-paid sports announcer in television.

==== The Baseball Network (1994–1995) ====
In 1994, ABC resumed their relationship with Major League Baseball for the first time since 1989 with a broadcasting joint-venture with NBC dubbed The Baseball Network. Michaels was once again paired with Jim Palmer and Tim McCarver, for whom he had broadcast three World Series (1985, 1987, and 1989), two All-Star Games (1986 and 1988), and the 1988 National League Championship Series with. On the subject of Michaels returning to baseball for the first time since the Loma Prieta earthquake interrupted the World Series, Jim Palmer said, "Here Al is, having done five games since 1989, and steps right in. It's hard to comprehend how one guy could so amaze."

Hi everyone, and welcome to Baseball Night in America, I'm Al Michaels. And those of us at ABC are delighted to be back in the business of broadcasting baseball for the first time since the 1989 World Series. And it's a brand new concept, we'll have six regular season games on ABC, including tonight and again on Monday night. Then, we'll bring you the Division playoffs in October, part of baseball's new expanded playoff format, and the World Series in late October. Baseball Night in America, a regionalized concept, you'll see a game in your region that's important to those of you in those particular areas. It also gives us the capability of updating games as never before. So sit back, relax and enjoy the premiere of Baseball Night in America as we take you out to the ballgames.

— Al Michaels on site at Seattle's Kingdome on the premiere broadcast of Baseball Night in America on July 16, 1994.

A player's strike in August 1994 would however, force the cancellation of that season's postseason, including the World Series. Then in June 1995, both ABC and NBC announced they would be dissolving The Baseball Network at the end of the 1995 season. The following month, Michaels along with Jim Palmer and Tim McCarver, called the All-Star Game from Arlington, Texas. Come that October, Michaels, Palmer, and McCarver would call Games 1–2 of the National League Division Series between the Cincinnati Reds and Los Angeles Dodgers, Game 4 of the NLDS between the Atlanta Braves and Colorado Rockies, Games 1–2 of the National League Championship Series between Atlanta and Cincinnati, and Games 1, 4–5 of the World Series between Atlanta and the Cleveland Indians.

In what would be the final out he would ever call for a baseball broadcast on ABC, Michaels yelled "Back to Georgia!" following the strikeout of Atlanta second baseman Mark Lemke by Cleveland closer José Mesa. ABC was in-line to televise a possible seventh game (since NBC was already scheduled to broadcast Game 6), however the Braves wound up clinching the world title two nights later. Game 5 of the 1995 World Series would not only prove to be the final Major League Baseball game Michaels would call (not counting a one shot appearance on MLB Network for a game between the San Francisco Giants and New York Mets on July 8, 2011), but it would also prove to be the last time a Major League Baseball game would be broadcast on ABC until the 2020 Wild Card series.

Michaels would later write in his 2014 autobiography You Can't Make This Up: Miracles, Memories, and the Perfect Marriage of Sports and Television that the competition between the two networks could be so juvenile that neither ABC nor NBC wanted to promote each other's telecasts during the 1995 World Series. To give you a better idea, in the middle of Game 1, Michaels was handed a promo that read "Join us here on ABC for Game 4 in Cleveland on Wednesday night and for Game 5 if necessary, Thursday." Michaels however, would soon follow this up by saying "By the way, if you're wondering about Games 2 and 3, I can't tell you exactly where you can see them, but here's a hint: Last night, Bob Costas, Bob Uecker, and Joe Morgan [NBC's broadcast crew] were spotted in Underground Atlanta."

=== Monday Night Football ===
Michaels's longest-running assignment was that of the lead play-by-play announcer on ABC's Monday Night Football telecasts, a position he held for 20 seasons beginning in 1986. Before that, his most notable NFL assignment for ABC was hosting (along with Jim Lampley) the pre-game coverage of Super Bowl XIX at the end of the 1984 season. In 1988, he called his first Super Bowl. Three years later, he was on hand to call the thrilling Super Bowl between the New York Giants and Buffalo Bills.

The trio of Michaels, Dan Dierdorf (who joined MNF the year after Michaels's first), and Frank Gifford lasted until the 1997 season when Gifford was replaced following disclosure of an extramarital affair. During the 1980s, Gifford would fill-in for Michaels on play-by-play whenever he went on baseball assignments for the League Championship Series (1986 and 1988) or World Series (1987 and 1989).

Former Cincinnati Bengals quarterback Boomer Esiason (who left after the 1999 season) replaced Gifford in 1998, and Dierdorf was dropped after that season. Unexpectedly, comedian Dennis Miller joined the cast in 2000 along with Dan Fouts. In 2002, following Miller and Fouts's departure, John Madden joined Michaels in a well-received pairing.

=== NBA on ABC ===
After disastrous ratings in the 2003 NBA Finals, ABC decided to revamp their lead NBA broadcast team. Brad Nessler was reassigned to the second broadcast team, where he was joined by Sean Elliott and Dan Majerle. Michaels was hired to replace Nessler as lead broadcaster of the NBA.

For the first several weeks of the 2003–2004 season, Michaels had no partner. However, Doc Rivers, a critically acclaimed analyst when he worked with Turner Sports, became available after a 1–19 start by his Orlando Magic. Rivers was hired weeks before ABC's Christmas Day season opener. He and Michaels worked that game together, one of only six they did together during the regular season (all other games Rivers worked were with Brad Nessler). During the playoffs, the team worked every single telecast, including the 2004 NBA Finals, which saw great improvement in television ratings. During the 2004 NBA Playoffs, Doc Rivers was hired by the Boston Celtics. Though Rivers continued to work games with him throughout the rest of the playoffs, ABC would have to find a new lead color commentator for the 2004–2005 season.

Early in the 2004–2005 season, ABC found a new partner for Al Michaels. Memphis Grizzlies coach Hubie Brown, a broadcasting legend with CBS, TBS, and TNT, was forced into retirement for health reasons and was soon after hired to replace Doc Rivers. He and Brown began their partnership on Christmas Day 2004, working the highly anticipated Shaquille O'Neal-Kobe Bryant game. After that game, the two did not do a game together again until March 2005. He became sporadic in NBA coverage, doing two games in early March, and then three more games in April. Brown worked every week of ABC's coverage, broadcasting some games with veteran broadcaster Mike Breen. For the 2005–2006 season, the pair were slated to remain as ABC's lead broadcast team. The duo worked that year's Christmas Day game between the Los Angeles Lakers and Miami Heat and was expected to work the NBA Finals together as well. However, due to his impending departure to NBC, that plan did not come to fruition.

Replacing him on The NBA on ABC was Mike Breen, who became the lead broadcaster for an over-the-air NBA package for the first time in his career. Breen worked the 2006 NBA Finals with Hubie Brown, as well as all the main games ABC broadcast that year. This gave ABC its first consistent lead broadcaster since Brad Nessler, as Breen (unlike Michaels) did games every week. To put things into proper perspective, during his two-season tenure as ABC's lead NBA broadcaster, he called just 13 of a possible 26 regular season games, with all but two games taking place from either Los Angeles (where he resides) or Sacramento.

Besides his inconsistent work, Michaels (despite being initially seen as adding credibility to ABC's NBA broadcasts in contrast to his predecessor, Brad Nessler) was criticized for apparently lacking the kind of enthusiasm and confidence (for instance, Michaels initially reacted to Amar'e Stoudemire's block of Tim Duncan's shot during the 2005 playoffs by calling it a "great, great contested shot") expected of a No. 1 play-by-play voice. Barry Horn of the Dallas Morning News said that Michaels was simply "not a basketball guy". Meanwhile, Bill Simmons said during the 2005 Finals that Michaels "shows up for these games, does his job, then drives home thinking, 'Only five weeks to the [NFL] Hall of Fame Game, I'm almost there!'"

Another criticism that he received was that he too often found himself making tediously long-winded explanations. In return, he would tend to talk over two or three possessions in a row (which Michaels seemed to be better suited for football and baseball broadcasts, for which he is better known). The result was that he would hardly have time to comment on the action viewers were seeing because he was so hung up on a prior subplot or storyline that he felt the audience just had to know about.

== Move from ABC to NBC ==
=== ABC loses NFL rights ===
In 2003, Michaels was quoted as saying, "ABC Sports has been my professional home for the last 26 years, and I am delighted that will continue to be for several more ..." after signing a long-term contract extension.

In 2005, it was announced that Monday Night Football would be moving from ABC to ESPN beginning with the 2006 season, and partner John Madden announced he would be joining NBC Sports, which had acquired the rights to Sunday Night Football games. Despite speculation that Michaels might be joining NBC as well, Michaels stated that he would continue as the MNF play-by-play announcer, stating, "I feel like I'm a creature of Monday night. I'm home and I'm staying home." Plans were for Michaels to be teamed with Joe Theismann (who would be coming over from Sunday Night Football) on the Monday night telecasts.

At the time, then-ABC Television President Alex Wallau said, "For 26 years Al has played a pivotal role here at ABC Sports, and for 17 of those years he's been the face and voice synonymous with television's most successful sports franchise, Monday Night Football... It's Al's outstanding play-by-play coverage, coupled with his breadth of knowledge, experience and enthusiasm, that keep MNF fans invigorated, excited and coming back for more." also, "Al Michaels has been invaluable to the Network and we are thrilled to have him remain in our family. [...] Al is the consummate professional and makes everyone around him better" said then-ABC Sports President Howard Katz; however, in the weeks leading up to Super Bowl XL, it was widely speculated that Michaels was attempting to get out of his contract with ESPN to join Madden at NBC. By this time, it was clear that NBC's Sunday Night Football would be the NFL's premier prime-time package, with ESPN's Monday Night Football relegated to secondary match-ups similar to ESPN's previous Sunday night telecasts. Michaels added fuel to the fire by refusing to state his future plans, and he could not "respond to rumors ... because that would become a distraction."

On February 8, 2006, ESPN announced that its Monday Night Football team would consist of Mike Tirico on play-by-play, with Theismann and Tony Kornheiser as analysts. ESPN explicitly stated that Michaels would not return to either Monday Night Football broadcasts or ABC's NBA broadcasts (on which Michaels had been lead NBA play-by-play man).

=== Oswald the Lucky Rabbit "trade" ===
On February 9, 2006, NBC confirmed that Michaels would be joining Madden at NBC to broadcast the NFL on Sunday nights, thus ending Michaels's 20-year run on Monday Night Football and almost 30 years of service with ABC. In exchange for letting Michaels out of his contract with ABC and ESPN, NBCUniversal sold ESPN cable rights to Friday coverage of the next four Ryder Cups, granted ESPN increased usage of Olympic highlights, and sold to parent company Disney the rights to Oswald the Lucky Rabbit.

== NBC Sports (2006–2023) ==
=== Sunday Night Football ===
Michaels and Madden began their new NBC tenure on August 6, 2006, with NBC's telecast of the preseason Pro Football Hall of Fame Game, with their regular-season debut on September 7. Michaels called Sunday Night Football with John Madden from August 6, 2006 – April 15, 2009. On April 16, 2009, Cris Collinsworth made an agreement with NBC to join Michaels, replacing Madden for Sunday Night Football. On February 1, 2009, Michaels called Super Bowl XLIII, his first Super Bowl telecast for NBC and seventh overall as a play-by-play announcer. Michaels is the third man to ever do play-by-play for an NBC broadcast of a Super Bowl, following the footsteps of Curt Gowdy and Dick Enberg. Michaels also called Super Bowl XLVI on February 5, 2012, Super Bowl XLIX on February 1, 2015, Super Bowl LII on February 4, 2018, and Super Bowl LVI on February 13, 2022, and in doing so, he tied Pat Summerall for the most Super Bowls called by a play-by-play announcer, though Summerall still holds the record for the most Super Bowls announced at 16, having also worked Super Bowl I as a sideline reporter and Super Bowls II, IV, VI, and VIII as a color commentator.

Michaels usually ate his dinner while doing play-by-play commentary during a typical broadcast of Sunday Night Football. Michaels would have cookies and grapes during the first half and a light dinner during the second half, having his bites during commercial breaks.

On May 24, 2022, NBC announced that despite his official departure from Sunday Night Football following the 2021 season, Michaels would still call at least one NFL playoff game for NBC under an "emeritus" role. However, in December 2023, it was reported that he was cut from postseason coverage on NBC beginning with the 2023–24 NFL playoffs.

=== NBC Olympic Daytime host ===
In March 2009, it was announced that Michaels would be serving as the daytime host for NBC's coverage of the 2010 Winter Olympics in Vancouver, British Columbia. It was Michaels's first involvement in an Olympic telecast since he called ice hockey at the 1988 Calgary Games for ABC, as well as his first non-NFL event for NBC. NBC Sports chairman Dick Ebersol said that Michaels had previously expressed an interest in contributing to NBC's Olympics coverage. Michaels also co-hosted NBC's coverage of the Closing Ceremony (with Bob Costas). Michaels also served as daytime co-host (with Dan Patrick) for the 2012 Summer Olympics in London, and co-hosted the Closing Ceremony (with Costas and Ryan Seacrest). For the 2014 Winter Olympics in Sochi, Michaels served as weekday host on NBCSN and weekend daytime host on NBC. He returned to host daytime coverage for the 2016 Summer Olympics in Rio de Janeiro.

According to Michaels, ABC was in the running to purchase the broadcasting rights for the 1996 Summer Games from Atlanta. As a provision in his contract renewal with ABC back in 1992, in the event that ABC were to broadcast the Olympics again, Michaels would get to become the prime time anchor while Jim McKay would instead play an emeritus role. Ultimately though, NBC bought the rights to the Atlanta Games for $456 million, edging out ABC by $6 million.

=== Premier Boxing Champions ===
In January 2015, NBC announced that Michaels would be at ringside along with Marv Albert and Sugar Ray Leonard for the PBC on NBC Saturday night bouts. In partnership with Haymon Boxing, NBC would televise 20 PBC on NBC events, including five shown in prime time on Saturday nights.

== MLB Network (2011) ==
On July 8, 2011, Michaels teamed up with Bob Costas (with the two announcers alternating between play-by-play and color commentary) to call a game between the New York Mets and San Francisco Giants on MLB Network. It was Michaels's first appearance on a baseball telecast since August 6, 2003 (when he served as a guest commentator on an ESPN game, as previously mentioned) and his first as a primary announcer since Game 5 of the 1995 World Series on ABC. (Michaels had called Games 1, 4 and 5 of that series with Jim Palmer and Tim McCarver, while Costas called Games 2, 3 and 6 with Joe Morgan and Bob Uecker for NBC.) Michaels and Costas also made appearances on SportsNet New York and Comcast SportsNet Bay Area during the game's middle innings, since the MLB Network broadcast was blacked out in the Mets' and Giants' respective home markets.

== Thursday Night Football (2016, 2022–present) ==
Michaels first called Thursday Night Football in 2016, as part of a deal which would see NBC produce several Thursday night games for broadcast on NFL Network with simulcasts on selected games on NBC. The following year, NBC confirmed that Mike Tirico would take over as the voice of NBC-produced Thursday night games.

On March 23, 2022, the NFL and Amazon announced that Michaels would become the full-time play-by-play announcer for Thursday Night Football, alongside Kirk Herbstreit, for the first year of the package airing exclusively on Amazon Prime Video and Twitch.

Throughout his tenure as the play-by-play announcer for Amazon Prime, viewers have repeatedly criticized Michaels for a perceived lack of enthusiasm during games. When asked about his experience calling Thursday night games, Michaels hinted at the suboptimal quality of the games and said, "I mean, you just can't oversell something. Do you want me to sell you a 20-year-old Mazda? That's what you're asking me to do. I can't sell you a used car."

== Career timeline ==
- 1968–1970: Hawaii Islanders Play-by-play
- 1971–1973: Cincinnati Reds Radio Play-by-play
- 1971–1974: NFL on NBC Play-by-play
- 1972 and 1980–1988: Winter Olympics Hockey Play-by-play (NBC 1972, ABC 1980–1988)
- 1973–1975: UCLA Basketball TV Play-by-play
- 1974–1976: San Francisco Giants TV & Radio Play-by-play
- 1975: NFL on CBS Play-by-play
- 1976–1989, 1994–1995: Major League Baseball on ABC Play-by-play (Lead Play-by-play from 1983 to 1989 and 1994 to 1995)
- 1977–1985: College Football on ABC Play-by-play
- 1986–2000: Kentucky Derby Host (ABC)
- 1986–2000: Preakness Stakes Host (ABC)
- 1986–2000: Belmont Stakes Host (ABC)
- 1986–2005: ABC Monday Night Football Play-by-play
- 1987–1989: College Basketball on ABC Play-by-play
- 1989–1992: Sugar Bowl Play-by-play (ABC)
- 2000–2002: NHL on ABC Stanley Cup Final host
- 2003–2005: NBA on ABC Play-by-play
- 2006–2021: NBC Sunday Night Football Play-by-play
- 2015: PBC on NBC Host
- 2016: Thursday Night Football on NBC/NFL Network Play-by-play
- 2022–present: Thursday Night Football on Amazon Prime Video Play-by-play
- 2022–present: NBC Sports Emeritus role

=== Notable broadcasts ===
Michaels was the play-by-play announcer for these notable events unless otherwise noted.

- 1972 Winter Olympics men's ice hockey
- 1972 National League Championship Series
- 1972 World Series
- 1977 NAPA National 500
- 1979 Gabriel 400
- 1979 World Series (Games 3–5)
- 1980 Winter Olympics men's ice hockey ("Miracle on Ice")
- 1981 World Series (Games 3–5)
- 1983 World Series
- 1984 Winter Olympics men's ice hockey
- Super Bowl XIX (1985, co-host with Jim Lampley)
- 1984 Summer Olympics athletics and road bicycle racing
- 1985 World Series
- 112th Kentucky Derby (1986, host)
- 111th Preakness Stakes (1986, host)
- 1986 Belmont Stakes (host)
- 1986 American League Championship Series
- 113th Kentucky Derby (1987, host)
- 112th Preakness Stakes (1987, host)
- 1987 Belmont Stakes (host)
- 1987 World Series
- Super Bowl XXII (1988)
- 1988 Winter Olympics men's ice hockey
- 114th Kentucky Derby (1988, host)
- 113th Preakness Stakes (1988, host)
- 1988 Belmont Stakes (host)
- 1988 NLCS
- 1989 Sugar Bowl
- 115th Kentucky Derby (1989, host)
- 114th Preakness Stakes (1989, host)
- 1989 Belmont Stakes (host)
- 1989 World Series
- 1990 Sugar Bowl
- 116th Kentucky Derby (1990, host)
- 115th Preakness Stakes (1990, host)
- 1990 Belmont Stakes (host)
- 1991 Sugar Bowl
- Super Bowl XXV (1991)
- 117th Kentucky Derby (1991, host)
- 116th Preakness Stakes (1991, host)
- 1991 Belmont Stakes (host)
- 1992 Sugar Bowl
- 118th Kentucky Derby (1992, host)
- 117th Preakness Stakes (1992, host)
- 1992 Belmont Stakes (host)
- 119th Kentucky Derby (1993, host)
- 118th Preakness Stakes (1993, host)
- 1993 Stanley Cup Final (host)
- 1993 Belmont Stakes (host)
- 120th Kentucky Derby (1994, host)
- 119th Preakness Stakes (1994, host)
- 1994 Belmont Stakes (host)
- Super Bowl XXIX (1995)
- 121st Kentucky Derby (1995, host)
- 120th Preakness Stakes (1995, host)
- 1995 Belmont Stakes (host)
- 1995 World Series (Games 1, 4–5)
- 122nd Kentucky Derby (1996, host)
- 121st Preakness Stakes (1996, host)
- 1996 Belmont Stakes (host)
- 123rd Kentucky Derby (1997, host)
- 122nd Preakness Stakes (1997, host)
- 1997 Belmont Stakes (host)
- 124th Kentucky Derby (1998, host)
- 123rd Preakness Stakes (1998, host)
- 1998 Belmont Stakes (host)
- 125th Kentucky Derby (1999, host)
- 124th Preakness Stakes (1999, Host)
- 1999 Indianapolis 500 (host)
- 1999 Belmont Stakes (host)
- Super Bowl XXXIV (2000)
- 126th Kentucky Derby (2000, host)
- 125th Preakness Stakes (2000, host)
- 2000 Indianapolis 500 (host)
- 2000 Stanley Cup Final (host)
- 2000 Belmont Stakes (host)
- 2001 Indianapolis 500 (host)
- 2001 Stanley Cup Final (host)
- 2002 Stanley Cup Final (host)
- Super Bowl XXXVII (2003)
- NBA on Christmas Day 2004 and 2005: Los Angeles Lakers vs Miami Heat
- 2004 NBA Finals
- 2005 NBA Finals
- Super Bowl XL (2006; last Super Bowl and NFL telecast for ABC)
- Super Bowl XLIII (2009; last telecast paired with color commentator John Madden)
- 2010 Winter Olympics (daytime host and co-host of closing ceremony)
- The "Butt Fumble" November 22, 2012
- Super Bowl XLVI (2012)
- 2012 Summer Olympics (daytime host and co-host of closing ceremony)
- 2014 Winter Olympics (weekday host for NBCSN, weekend daytime host for NBC and co-host for closing ceremony)
- Super Bowl XLIX (2015)
- 2016 Summer Olympics (daytime co-host)
- Super Bowl LII (2018)
- Super Bowl LVI (2022)

== Awards and honors ==
Sportscasting

- Five-time Sports Emmy Award winner – Outstanding Sports Personality, Play-by-Play
- Three-time NSMA National Sportscaster of the Year
- Sportscaster of the Year – American Sportscasters Association (ASA)
- Sportscaster of the Year – Washington Journalism Review
- ASA Top 50 Sportscasters of All Time.
- Walter Cronkite Award for Excellence in Journalism (2002).
- Pacific Pioneer Broadcasters "Art Gilmore Career Achievement Award" June 16, 2017
- IIHF Media Award, 2024

Halls of Fame

- Star on the Hollywood Walk of Fame
- NSMA Hall of Fame inductee (class of 1998)
- Television Academy Hall of Fame inductee (class of 2013)
- 2013 Pete Rozelle Radio & Television Award – Pro Football Hall of Fame
- 2021 Ford C. Frick Award winner – Baseball Hall of Fame

State/local

- Football stadium at Alexander Hamilton High School in Los Angeles (Michaels's alma mater) named Al Michaels Field.

== In popular culture ==
Michaels had a role in "Run, Johnny, Run", a 1970 episode of Hawaii Five-O; voiced a character in Homeward Bound II: Lost in San Francisco; and appeared as himself in Jerry Maguire, BASEketball, Coach and Spin City. His call of the US victory in the 1980 Olympics is partially recreated in the 2004 film Miracle.

Brian d'Arcy James portrayed Michaels in the 2002 television movie Monday Night Mayhem.

Michaels was the featured voice in HardBall III, and the Madden NFL series from Madden NFL 2003 to Madden NFL 09.

Michaels appeared in two episodes of Arliss, portraying the older cousin of sports agent Arliss Michaels.

== Personal life ==
Michaels is the eldest child of Jay and Lila Michaels. Michaels has a younger brother, David Michaels, and a younger sister, Susan.

Al Michaels currently resides in the Brentwood neighborhood in Los Angeles. He was 21 years old when he married his wife Linda on August 27, 1966. Al and Linda have two children together, Jennifer and Steven. Steven Michaels serves as president and CEO of independent film company Asylum Entertainment in Los Angeles. Michaels is also a Los Angeles Kings season ticket holder.

Al's younger brother David is a television producer. David Michaels has produced such programs as NBC's coverage of the Olympic Games, Triple Crown, and Fox Sports Net's Beyond the Glory series.

Michaels was arrested and charged for driving under the influence on April 21, 2013. He was released after about five hours. He eventually pleaded no contest to a reduced charge of reckless driving and was sentenced to 80 hours of community service plus probation.

In 2014, Michaels released his autobiography titled You Can't Make This Up: Memories and the Perfect Marriage of Sports and Television, which reached The New York Times Best Seller list for nonfiction.

Michaels has stated that he has a long-held belief that he has never knowingly eaten a vegetable. He has also stated that he dislikes the look and texture of most vegetables.

Media offices
Preceded by Joe Garagiola on NBC in 1978; Sean McDonough on CBS in 1993	World Series network television play-by-play announcer (with Keith Jackson in 1979 and 1981 and NBC's Bob Costas in 1995; concurrent with NBC's Joe Garagiola, Dick Enberg, and Vin Scully in odd numbered years); 1979–1989; 1995	Succeeded by Jack Buck on CBS in 1990; Joe Buck on FOX in 1996
Preceded by Brent Musburger	Super Bowl studio host with Jim Lampley; 1985	Succeeded by Bob Costas
Preceded by Frank Gifford	Monday Night Football play-by-play announcer 1986–2005	Succeeded by Mike Tirico
Preceded by Brad Nessler	Lead play-by-play announcer, NBA on ABC; 2003–2005	Succeeded by Mike Breen
Preceded by Brad Nessler	Play-by-play announcer, NBA Finals; 2004–2005	Succeeded by Mike Breen
Preceded by Mike Patrick (on ESPN)	Sunday Night Football play-by-play 2006–2021	Succeeded by Mike Tirico
Preceded by Frank Gifford	Super Bowl television play-by-play announcer (non-cable prime-time package carrier); 1987–2022	Succeeded by Mike Tirico
Preceded by Jim Lampley	American Winter Olympics daytime host 2010–2014 (Lester Holt hosted on weekdays in 2014; Michaels hosted the weekday coverage on NBCSN and weekend coverage on NBC)	Succeeded by Rebecca Lowe
Preceded by Jim Nantz	Thursday Night Football lead play-by-play 2016 shared with Jim Nantz (2016)	Succeeded by Mike Tirico
Preceded by Dick Enberg (in 1997)	Lead NFL on NBC play-by-play announcer 2006–2021	Succeeded by Mike Tirico
Preceded by Joe Buck	Thursday Night Football play-by-play announcer 2022–present	Succeeded by Incumbent
Preceded by Merle Harmon (in 1965)	#2 play-by-play announcer, Major League Baseball on ABC; 1976–1982	Succeeded by Don Drysdale
Preceded by Keith Jackson	Lead play-by-play announcer, Major League Baseball on ABC; 1983–1989; 1994–1995	Succeeded by Last
