= South Ocean (horse) =

Canadian Thoroughbred racehorse

- Sire: New Providence
- Grandsire: Bull Page
- Dam: Shining Sun
- Damsire: Chop Chop
- Sex: Mare
- Foaled: 1967
- Country: Canada
- Color: Bay
- Breeder: E. P. Taylor
- Owner: Charles Taylor
- Trainer: Gordon McCann
- Record: 22: 4-8-5
- Earnings: $70,147

Major wins
- Simcoe Stakes (1969); Canadian Oaks (1970)

Honors
- Canadian Horse Racing Hall of Fame (2017); South Ocean Stakes at Woodbine Racetrack

South Ocean (1967–1989) was a Canadian Thoroughbred Hall of Fame mare raced by Charles Taylor. She was bred by Charles's father E. P. Taylor, Canada's preeminent name in Thoroughbred racing and in world breeding history.

== Breeding ==
South Ocean was bred at E. P. Taylor's Windfields Farm near Oshawa, Ontario. She was a daughter of New Providence who won the 1959 Canadian Triple Crown. New Providence's sire was the Kentucky bred stallion Bull Page, the 1951 Canadian Horse of the Year who also sired Flaming Page, a Canadian Hall of Fame filly that won the 1962 Queen's Plate and Canadian Oaks. Bred to the Taylor's legendary super-sire and sire of sires Northern Dancer, Flaming Page produced English Triple Crown Champion, Nijinsky.

E. P. Taylor also bred South Ocean's dam Shining Sun. A winner of two minor races, Shining Sun's sire was Chop Chop, a multiple stakes winner before an injury ended his racing career. However, it was Chop Chop's success as a sire that earned him induction into the Canadian Hall of Fame. His other offspring included four Queen's Plate winners, of which Canadiana and Victoria Park were Hall of Fame inductees. Chop Chop's daughter, Ciboulette, was the damsire of Eclipse and Sovereign Award winner and Canadian Hall of Fame inductee, Fanfreluche who would be one of South Ocean's main rivals during their racing years.

Shining Sun's dam was Solar Display whose sire line traces to Teddy, the very influential sire whose progeny included La Troienne, an important broodmare, Bull Dog, the Champion foundation sire responsible for making Calumet Farm one of the most successful racing stables in American history, and Sir Gallahad who was the Leading sire in North America four times, and Leading broodmare sire in North America a record twelve times.

== Racing career ==
Ridden by Canadian National Champion jockey Richard Grubb, at Woodbine Racetrack in Toronto South Ocean won the Simcoe Stakes for two-year-olds. At three she captured a division of the top race in Canada for three-year-old fillies, the Canadian Oaks. In the Oaks she was ridden by Sandy Hawley, a Canadian and U.S. Racing Hall of Fame inductee. South Ocean beat rival Fanfreluche in the Canadian Oakes but ran second to her in the Princess Elizabeth Stakes and the Bison City Stakes.

== Broodmare success ==
South Ocean was the dam of Canadian Hall of Fame inductees Northernette and Storm Bird, both of which were the results of matings to Northern Dancer. A 1974 foal, Northernette was a Canadian Champion at ages two and three who also won top races in the United States, including the then-Grade 1 Top Flight Handicap and Grade 2 Apple Blossom Handicap.

Storm Bird was South Ocean's next important foal, born in 1978. Racing in England in 1980, he went undefeated and was named the two-year-old English Champion. At stud in Kentucky, he sired 63 stakes race winners, including 1990 Preakness Stakes winner Summer Squall, who sired Charismatic, the 1999 American Horse of the Year and winner of the Kentucky Derby and Preakness Stakes. In addition, among other successful progeny sired by Summer Squall was Storm Song, who won the 1996 Breeders' Cup Juvenile Fillies and was voted American Champion Two-Year-Old Filly. Storm Bird's lasting impact of Thoroughbred racing was through his son Storm Cat, who was the leading juvenile sire in North America seven times and the overall Leading sire in North America in 1999 and 2000. He was the Leading broodmare sire three times, from 2012 through 2014. Through those daughters, Storm Cat was the broodmare sire of more than 100 stakes race winners. Storm Cat's success saw his stud fee rise to $500,000. His career as a stallion produced eight National Champions and winners of 108 graded stakes races. A few among these were Life Is Sweet, Storm Flag Flying, Black Minnaloushe, Tabasco Cat, and Giant's Causeway, the 2000 European Horse of the Year and a three-time leading sire in North America.

== Honours ==
In 1997, Woodbine Racetrack created the South Ocean Stakes in her honour and following the success of her progeny, in 2017 she was inducted into the Canadian Horse Racing Hall of Fame.

== Pedigree ==
Pedigree of South Ocean, bay mare, 1967
| Sire New Providence | Bull Page | Bull Lea | Bull Dog |
| Sire New Providence | Bull Page | Bull Lea | Rose leaves |
| Sire New Providence | Bull Page | Our Page | Blue Larkspur |
| Sire New Providence | Bull Page | Our Page | Occult |
| Sire New Providence | Fair Colleen | Preciptic | Precipitation |
| Sire New Providence | Fair Colleen | Preciptic | Artistic |
| Sire New Providence | Fair Colleen | Fairvale | Fairford |
| Sire New Providence | Fair Colleen | Fairvale | Vallema |
| Dam Shining Sun | Chop Chop | Flares | Gallant Fox |
| Dam Shining Sun | Chop Chop | Flares | Flambino |
| Dam Shining Sun | Chop Chop | Sceptical | Buchan |
| Dam Shining Sun | Chop Chop | Sceptical | Clodagh |
| Dam Shining Sun | Solar Display | Sun Again | Sun Teddy |
| Dam Shining Sun | Solar Display | Sun Again | Hug Again |
| Dam Shining Sun | Solar Display | Dark Display | Display |
| Dam Shining Sun | Solar Display | Dark Display | Dark Loveliness (family: 4-j) |
