= 1999 Belmont Stakes =

American horse race

131st Belmont Stakes
- Belmont Stakes
- Location: Belmont Park; Elmont, New York, U.S.
- Date: June 5, 1999
- Distance: 1 1/2 mi (12 furlongs; 2,414 m)
- Winning horse: Lemon Drop Kid
- Winning time: 2:27.88
- Final odds: 29.75 (to 1)
- Jockey: José A. Santos
- Trainer: Flint S. "Scotty" Schulhofer
- Owner: Jeanne Vance
- Conditions: Fast
- Surface: Dirt
- Attendance: 85,818

The 1999 Belmont Stakes was the 131st running of the Belmont Stakes and the 95th time the event took place at Belmont Park in Elmont, New York.

Lemon Drop Kid, ridden by José A. Santos and trained by Flint S. "Scotty" Schulhofer, won the 1 1/2-mile stakes race in front of a then-record 85,818 crowd, and thus denying Charismatic winning the Triple Crown.

Near the finish line, Charismatic fractured two bones in his left front leg. He was quickly pulled up by jockey Chris Antley, who dismounted and cradled the leg to prevent further injury.

== Race description ==
Charismatic, who had won both the Kentucky Derby and Preakness Stakes, was made the 3-2 favorite in the Belmont as he attempted to win the Triple Crown. His main rivals were expected to be Menifee (5-2), who had finished second in both the Derby and Preakness, and the filly Silverbulletday (5-1), who had won eight straight races. Lemon Drop Kid, who had finished ninth in the Derby and third in the Peter Pan Stakes, was considered a longshot at odds of nearly 30-1.

In the absence of other speed horses, Silverbulletday was expected to set the early pace. Rather than let her get an uncontested lead and perhaps steal the race, Chris Antley on Charismatic decided to press the pace. The two raced heads apart for the first half mile, completed in a relatively fast time of 47 3/5 seconds. Silverbulletday then opened up a half length lead before tiring, eventually finishing seventh. Charismatic responded to a challenge from Stephen Got Even around the final turn, and briefly took the lead despite drifting out as they entered the stretch.

Meanwhile, Lemon Drop Kid rated in eighth place behind the early pace. Around the final turn, he started to make up ground after finding room on the rail. Entering the stretch, he was swung wide by jockey José A. Santos and quickly pulled clear of Charismatic. He then withstood a late run from longshot Vision and Verse to win by a head. Charismatic held on for third but was pulled up quickly after the finish line. It was later determined that Charismatic fractured both the sesamoid and cannon bones in his left front leg. Antley dismounted and held up Charismatic's leg until the track ambulance arrived to van the horse off.

The race proved both a low point and highlight in Antley's racing career. In addition to losing a chance to win the Triple Crown, Antley was criticized by some for his racing tactics in pressing the early pace. On the other hand, he earned widespread praise for pulling up Charismatic so quickly: the horse survived his injuries.

== Payout ==
Pgm	Horse	Win	Place	Show
6	Lemon Drop Kid	$61.50	$26.00	$10.60
2	Vision and Verse		$44.40	$17.00
4	Charismatic			$3.60

- $2 Exacta (6-2) paid $1,537.00
- $2 Trifecta (6-2-4) paid $5,343.00

== Full results ==
Finish	PP	Horse	Jockey	Trainer	Owner	Final Odds	Winnings
1	6	Lemon Drop Kid	José A. Santos	Flint S. Schulhofer	Jeanne G. Vance	29.75	$600,000
2	2	Vision and Verse	Heberto Castillo Jr.	William I. Mott	W. Bruce Lunsford	54.75	$200,000
3	4	Charismatic	Chris Antley	D. Wayne Lukas	Robert B. & Beverly Lewis	1.60	$110,000
4	12	Best of Luck	Jean-Luc Samyn	H. Allen Jerkens	Bohemia Stable	13.00	$60,000
5	11	Stephen Got Even	Shane Sellers	Nick Zito	Stephen C Hilbert	9.30	$30,000
6	7	Patience Game	Kent Desormeaux	Alex L. Hassinger Jr.	The Thoroughbred Corporation	12.50	
7	3	Silverbulletday	Jerry D. Bailey	Bob Baffert	Michael E. Pegram	5.10	
8	10	Menifee	Pat Day	W. Elliott Walden	Arthur B. Hancock III & James Stone	2.60	
9	5	Pineaff	Sidney P. Lejeune Jr.	Kenneth McPeek	Joyce & Roy K. Monroe	60.00	
10	9	Prime Directive	Mike E. Smith	Patrick B. Byrne	Noreen Carpenito	76.00	
11	1	Teletable	John R. Velazquez	Alfredo Callejas	Robert Perez	75.75	
12	8	Adonis	Jorge F. Chavez	Nick Zito	Paraneck Stable	46.25	

== See also ==
- 1999 Kentucky Derby
- 1999 Preakness Stakes
