= Summer Squall =

American-bred Thoroughbred racehorse

- Summer Squall's grave at Lane's End Farm
- Sire: Storm Bird
- Grandsire: Northern Dancer
- Dam: Weekend Surprise
- Damsire: Secretariat
- Sex: Stallion
- Foaled: 1987
- Country: United States
- Colour: Bay
- Breeder: W.S. Farish III & William S. Kilroy
- Owner: Dogwood Stable
- Trainer: Neil J. Howard
- Record: 20: 13-4-0
- Earnings: $1,844,282

Major wins
- Hopeful Stakes (1989); Bashford Manor Stakes (1989); Saratoga Special Stakes (1989); Kentucky Breeders' Cup Stakes (1989); Jim Beam Stakes (1990); Pennsylvania Derby (1990); Blue Grass Stakes (1990); Fayette Handicap (1991) U.S. Triple Crown wins: Preakness Stakes (1990)

Summer Squall (March 12, 1987 – September 22, 2009) was an American thoroughbred racehorse and sire, best known for his win in the 1990 Preakness Stakes, and his rivalry with Unbridled, whom he defeated in four of their six meetings. He later became a successful breeding stallion siring the Kentucky Derby winner Charismatic.

== Background ==
Summer Squall was sired by Storm Bird, a son of 1964 Northern Dancer, "one of the most influential sires in Thoroughbred history." His dam was Weekend Surprise, who was also the dam of 1992 United States Horse of the Year A.P. Indy. Weekend Surprise's dam Lassie Dear was also the direct female-line ancestor of Duke of Marmalade, Lemon Drop Kid and Ruler of the World. Weekend Surprise is also the daughter of Triple Crown winner Secretariat.

Bred and born on the land that became Lane's End Farm in Versailles, Kentucky, by W.S. Farish III & W.S. Kilroy, Summer Squall was trained by Neil J. Howard and ridden by National Museum of Racing and Hall of Fame jockey Pat Day.

== Racing career ==
Racing at age two, Summer Squall went undefeated in all five of his starts. As a three-year-old in 1990, he became known for his rivalry with Unbridled. They met six times at ages three and four, with Summer Squall winning three of those races, including the Blue Grass Stakes, and finished ahead of Unbridled in one other, the 1991 Pimlico Special.

At Kentucky Derby post time, Summer Squall was sent off as the bettors' second choice behind Mister Frisky, a colt from Puerto Rico who had won a record sixteen straight races coming into the Derby including victories in California in the San Rafael and San Vicente Stakes and the important Grade I Santa Anita Derby. Running six lengths back, Summer Squall made a move as the field turned into the stretch for home but Unbridled came with him, then pulled away to win. Pleasant Tap finished third with Mister Frisky eighth.

Summer Squall won the Preakness Stakes by 2 1/2 lengths. In beating Unbridled, his 18 seconds for the final 3/16 of a mile was the fastest in Preakness history. Summer Squall had bled quite a bit during his racing in Florida and required Lasix to deal with the problem. However, Lasix was still banned in New York in 1990, so he did not race in the Belmont Stakes, in which rival Unbridled finished fourth without the use of Lasix. Summer Squall went on to win the Grade II Pennsylvania Derby with the use of Lasix, but he bled again while finishing off the board and far back in the Meadowlands Cup.

Summer Squall competed at age four in 1991, and though he never won another Grade I, he won the Fayette Handicap; then in Chicago at Arlington Park, he ran second to Black Tie Affair in the Washington Park Handicap. He also finished second to Farma Way in the then-Grade I Pimlico Special.

== Retirement ==
Summer Squall was a ridgling, meaning that he had an undescended testicle. However, this did not preclude him being used at stud. He stood at Lane's End Farm until he was pensioned in 2004 due to fertility problems. He was euthanized in September 2009 from infirmities of old age.

The sire of thirty-five stakes winners, Summer Squall produced offspring that included:

- Charismatic - 1999 Kentucky Derby winner, 1999 American Horse of the Year
- Storm Song - won 1996 Breeders' Cup Juvenile Fillies, American Champion Two-Year-Old Filly
- Summer Colony - millionaire filly, multiple stakes winner including the Grade I Personal Ensign Handicap
- Summer Mis - 2003 Illinois Horse of the Year

Summer Squall is also the damsire of Stevie Wonderboy and of Summer Bird, winner of the 2009 Belmont Stakes.

== Pedigree ==
Pedigree of Summer Squall
Sire Storm Bird bay 1978	Northern Dancer bay 1961	Nearctic brown 1954	Nearco
Sire Storm Bird bay 1978	Northern Dancer bay 1961	Nearctic brown 1954	Lady Angela
Sire Storm Bird bay 1978	Northern Dancer bay 1961	Natalma bay 1957	Native Dancer
Sire Storm Bird bay 1978	Northern Dancer bay 1961	Natalma bay 1957	Almahmoud
Sire Storm Bird bay 1978	South Ocean bay 1967	New Providence bay 1956	Bull Page
Sire Storm Bird bay 1978	South Ocean bay 1967	New Providence bay 1956	Fair Colleen
Sire Storm Bird bay 1978	South Ocean bay 1967	Shining Sun bay 1962	Chop Chop
Sire Storm Bird bay 1978	South Ocean bay 1967	Shining Sun bay 1962	Solar Display
Dam Weekend Surprise bay 1980	Secretariat chestnut 1970	Bold Ruler brown 1954	Nasrullah
Dam Weekend Surprise bay 1980	Secretariat chestnut 1970	Bold Ruler brown 1954	Miss Disco
Dam Weekend Surprise bay 1980	Secretariat chestnut 1970	Somethingroyal bay 1952	Princequillo
Dam Weekend Surprise bay 1980	Secretariat chestnut 1970	Somethingroyal bay 1952	Imperatrice
Dam Weekend Surprise bay 1980	Lassie Dear bay 1974	Buckpasser bay 1963	Tom Fool
Dam Weekend Surprise bay 1980	Lassie Dear bay 1974	Buckpasser bay 1963	Busanda
Dam Weekend Surprise bay 1980	Lassie Dear bay 1974	Gay Missile bay 1967	Sir Gaylord
Dam Weekend Surprise bay 1980	Lassie Dear bay 1974	Gay Missile bay 1967	Missy Baba (Family 3-l)
