= 1999 Kentucky Derby =

Horse race

125th Kentucky Derby
- Kentucky Derby
- Location: Churchill Downs
- Date: May 1, 1999
- Winning horse: Charismatic
- Jockey: Chris Antley
- Trainer: D. Wayne Lukas
- Owner: Bob & Beverly Lewis
- Conditions: Fast
- Surface: Dirt
- Attendance: 151,051

The 1999 Kentucky Derby was the 125th running of the Kentucky Derby. The race took place on May 1, 1999. There were 151,051 in attendance.

== Payout ==
The 125th Kentucky Derby Payout Schedule

Program Number	Horse Name	Win	Place	Show
11	Charismatic	$ 64.60	$27.80	$14.40
13	Menifee	-	$8.40	$5.80
8	Cat Thief	-	-	$5.80

- $2 Exacta: (11-13) Paid $727.80
- $2 Trifecta: (11-13-8) Paid $5,866.20
- $1 Superfecta: (11-13-8-9) Paid $24,015.50

== Full results ==
Finished	Post	Horse	Jockey	Trainer	Owner	Time / behind
1st	16	Charismatic	Chris Antley	D. Wayne Lukas	Robert B. & Beverly J. Lewis	2:03.29
2nd	18	Menifee	Pat Day	W. Elliott Walden	J. Stone & A. Hancock III	
3rd	10	Cat Thief	Mike E. Smith	D. Wayne Lukas	Overbrook Farm	
4th	13	Prime Timber	David Flores	Bob Baffert	Aaron U. & Marie Jones	
5th	5	Excellent Meeting	Kent Desormeaux	Bob Baffert	Golden Eagle Farm	
6th	12	Kimberlite Pipe	Robby Albarado	Dallas Stewart	Prairie Star Racing & John Gunther	
7th	11	Worldly Manner	Jerry D. Bailey	Saeed bin Suroor	Godolphin Racing, Inc.	
8th	9	K One King	Alex Solis	Akiko Gothard	Allen E. & Madeleine A. Paulson	
9th	19	Lemon Drop Kid	José A. Santos	Scotty Schulhofer	Jeanne Vance	
10th	7	Answer Lively	Craig Perret	Bobby C. Barnett	John A. Franks	
11th	14	General Challenge	Gary Stevens	Bob Baffert	Golden Eagle Farm	
12th	3	Ecton Park	Robbie Davis	W. Elliott Walden	Mark Stanley	
13th	6	Desert Hero	Corey Nakatani	Richard E. Mandella	The Thoroughbred Corp.	
14th	4	Stephen Got Even	Chris McCarron	Nick Zito	Stephen Hilbert	
15th	8	Valhol	Willie Martinez	Dallas E. Keen	James D. Jackson	
16th	15	First American	Eddie Delahoussaye	Eduardo Caramori	T N T Stud	
17th	1	Adonis	Jorge Chavez	Nick Zito	Paraneck Stable	
18th	17	Vicar	Shane Sellers	Carl Nafzger	James B. Tafel	
19th	2	Three Ring	John Velazquez	Eddie Plesa, Jr.	Barry Schwartz	

== See also ==
- 1999 Preakness Stakes
- 1999 Belmont Stakes
