= 1989 Kentucky Derby =

Horse race

115th Kentucky Derby
- Kentucky Derby
- Grade I stakes race
- Location: Churchill Downs
- Date: May 6, 1989
- Winning horse: Sunday Silence
- Jockey: Pat Valenzuela
- Trainer: Charles E. Whittingham
- Owner: Hancock III, Gaillard & Whittingham
- Conditions: Muddy
- Surface: Dirt
- Attendance: 122,653

The 1989 Kentucky Derby was the 115th running of the Kentucky Derby. The race took place on May 6, 1989, with 122,653 people in attendance. The race took place on a track that was listed as muddy but was drying out very well. The time on the 1 1/4-mile was the slowest time since Tim Tam rode to victory at the same length at also the same time of 2:05. Sunday Silence took the win with a 2 1/2 length victory over the favorite to win, Easy Goer.

== Full results ==
Finished	Post	Horse	Jockey	Trainer	Owner	Time / behind
1st	10	Sunday Silence	Pat Valenzuela	Charlie Whittingham	Hancock III, Gaillard & Whittingham	2:05
2nd	13	Easy Goer	Pat Day	Claude R. McGaughey III	Ogden Phipps	
3rd	12	Awe Inspiring	Craig Perret	Claude R. McGaughey III	Ogden Mills Phipps	
4th	7	Dansil	Larry Snyder	Frank L. Brothers	John A. Franks	
5th	4	Hawkster	Marco Castaneda	Ron McAnally	Mr. & Mrs. J. S. Meredith	
6th	15	Northern Wolf	Clarence Ladner III	Hank Allen	Deep Silver Stable	
7th	11	Irish Actor	Don Howard	LeRoy Jolley	Tiffany Farms	
8th	6	Houston	Laffit Pincay Jr.	D. Wayne Lukas	Beal, French Jr. & Lukas	
9th	9	Triple Buck	José A. Santos	John J. Lenzini Jr.	Gary Marano	
10th	5	Shy Tom	Chris Antley	D. Wayne Lukas	Overbrook Farm	
11th	14	Wind Splitter	Donnie Miller Jr.	Dale Capuano	Randall Williams Jr.	
12th	2	Flying Continental	Corey Black	Jay M. Robbins	Jack Kent Cooke	
13th	1	Clever Trevor	Don Pettinger	Donnie K. Von Hemel	Cheri & Don McNeill	
14th	8	Faultless Ensign	Chris DeCarlo	Benjamin W. Perkins Jr.	Anthony Tornettam et al.	
15th	3	Western Playboy	Randy Romero	Harvey L. Vanier	Nancy Vanier & Raymond Roncari	

== Purse winnings ==
Place	Horse	Purse Winnings	Total Purse Amount
1st	Sunday Silence	$574,200	$749,200

== Payout ==
Post	Horse	Win	Place	Show
10	Sunday Silence	US$8.20	3.00	3.60
2b	Easy Goer		2.60	3.40
2	Awe Inspiring			3.40

- $2 Exacta: (10–2) Paid $15.20

== Sunday Silence ==
Sunday Silence was an unlikely winner as a youngster, but he grew into a true champion. He sported crooked hind legs and barely survived a virus as a weanling. Sunday Silence was not an attractive youngster and his owner, Arthur B. Hancock III, attempted to sell him at the 1987 Keeneland yearling sale. Hancock ended up buying the colt back for only $17,000. Sunday Silence completed his two-year-old season with only one victory from three starts and was described as looking like a "skinny teenager" from Hancock. Between two and three years old, the colt matured and began his three-year-old season as a front runner for the Kentucky Derby. Sunday Silence won both the San Felipe Stakes and the Santa Anita Derby and anticipation built for the confrontation between Sunday Silence and his competition for the Kentucky Derby, Easy Goer. Sunday Silence's win at the Derby was largely attributed to the muddy track, which Easy Goer was claimed to have not liked. Sunday Silence bested Easy Goer by a win of 2 1/2 lengths.
