= 1989 Preakness Stakes =

114th running of the Preakness Stakes

114th Preakness Stakes
- The Preakness Stakes
- "The Second Jewel of the Triple Crown" "The Run for the Black-Eyed Susans"
- Location: Pimlico Race Course, Baltimore, Maryland, United States
- Date: May 20, 1989
- Winning horse: Sunday Silence
- Jockey: Pat Valenzuela
- Trainer: Charlie Whittingham
- Conditions: Fast
- Surface: Dirt

The 1989 Preakness Stakes was the 114th running of the Preakness Stakes thoroughbred horse race. The race took place on May 20, 1989, and was televised in the United States on the ABC television network. Sunday Silence, who was jockeyed by Pat Valenzuela, won the race by a nose over runner-up Easy Goer. Approximate post time was 5:35 p.m. Eastern Time. The race was run over a fast track in a final time of 1:53-4/5. The Maryland Jockey Club reported total attendance of 98,896, this is recorded as second highest on the list of American thoroughbred racing top attended events for North America in 1989.

Jim McKay of ABC Sports labeled it "the best race that I have ever witnessed" during the 1995 Preakness telecast. The stretch duel of the race itself was featured on ABC's Wide World of Sports prelude claiming to be the "thrill of victory" for 12 years. It preceded the more memorable line "and the agony of defeat".

== Payout ==
The 114th Preakness Stakes Payout Schedule

Program number	Horse name	Win	Place	Show
8	Sunday Silence	US$6.20	$3.00	$3.20
2	Easy Goer	-	$2.40	$2.40
5	Rock Point	-	-	$3.60

$2 Exacta: (8–2) paid $10.40

$2 Trifecta: (8-2–5) paid $66.00

== The full chart ==
Finish position	Margin (lengths)	Post position	Horse name	Jockey	Trainer	Owner	Post time odds	Purse earnings
1st	0	8	Sunday Silence	Pat Valenzuela	Charlie Whittingham	E. Gaillard/A. Hancock/C. Whittingham	2.10-1	$325,000
2nd	nose	2	Easy Goer	Pat Day	Claude McGaughey III	Ogden Phipps	.60-1 favorite	$100,000
3rd	5	6	Rock Point	Chris Antley	Sidney Watters Jr.	Brookmeade Stable	22.80-1	$50,000
4th	7	5	Dansil	Larry Snyder	Frank Brothers	John A. Franks	28.30-1	$25,000
5th	10 3/4	1	Hawkster	Marco Castaneda	Ronald McAnally	J. Shelton Meredith	53.60-1	
6th	12	7	Houston	Ángel Cordero Jr.	D. Wayne Lukas	Lloyd R. French, Barry Beal, D. W. Lukas	5.40-1	
7th	38	3	Pulverizing	Allen T. Stacy	Jerry Robb	Arnold A. Heft	70.00-1	
8th	39 1/2	9	Northern Wolf	Clarence J. Ladner	Harold A. Allen	Deep Silver Stable	33.70-1	

- Winning Breeder: Oak Cliff Thoroughbreds, Ltd.; (KY)
- Final Time: 1:53 4/5
- Track Condition: Fast
- Total Attendance: 98,896

== See also ==
- 1989 Kentucky Derby
