= Lemon Drop Kid =

American-bred Thoroughbred racehorse (1996–2024)

- Sire: Kingmambo
- Grandsire: Mr. Prospector
- Dam: Charming Lassie
- Damsire: Seattle Slew
- Sex: Stallion
- Foaled: May 26, 1996
- Died: December 13, 2024 (aged 28)
- Country: United States
- Colour: Bay
- Breeder: William S. Farish III; William S. Kilroy
- Owner: Jeanne G. Vance
- Trainer: Scotty Schulhofer
- Record: 24: 10-3-3
- Earnings: $3,245,370

Major wins
- Belmont Futurity Stakes (1998); Travers Stakes (1999); Brooklyn Handicap (2000); Suburban Handicap (2000); Whitney Handicap (2000); Woodward Stakes (2000) Triple Crown race wins: Belmont Stakes (1999)

Awards
- United States Champion Older Male Horse (2000)
- Last updated on June 26, 2007

Lemon Drop Kid (May 26, 1996 – December 13, 2024) was an American Thoroughbred racehorse and sire. Best known for winning the 1999 Belmont Stakes, he was also the champion older horse of 2000 after winning the Brooklyn, Suburban, Whitney Handicap, and the Woodward Stakes.

== Background ==
Lemon Drop Kid was a bay horse with no white markings bred in Kentucky by William S. Farish III and William S. Kilroy. He was sired by Kingmambo an American-bred horse who raced in Europe before returning to the United States to become a highly successful breeding stallion. His dam Charming Lassie, a daughter of Seattle Slew, went on to produce Statue of Liberty, a colt which won the Coventry Stakes in 2002. Charming Lassie's dam was Lassie Dear, an influential broodmare whose other descendants have included A.P. Indy, Summer Squall, Duke of Marmalade, and Wolfhound.

Lemon Drop Kid died on December 13, 2024, at the age of 28.

== Racing career ==
As a two-year-old horse in 1998, Lemon Drop Kid showed himself to be a very promising colt, with a victory in the Grade III Belmont Futurity in September.

Lemon Drop Kid won a minor race at Gulfstream Park in February 1999 but then appeared to have his limitations exposed when he was well-beaten in the Blue Grass Stakes and then finished ninth to Charismatic in the Kentucky Derby. The colt missed the Preakness Stakes but returned on 5 June for the Belmont Stakes, a race which featured Charismatic's attempt to become the first winner of the Triple Crown in more than 20 years. Ridden by José A. Santos he came from well off the pace to overtake Charismatic in the stretch and held off the rallying outsider Vision And Verse to win by a head. After the race, most of the attention went to Charismatic, who sustained a career-ending injury, rather than to the winner LDK.

In August Lemon Drop Kid followed up in the Travers Stakes, beating Vision And Verse again, with Menifee and Cat Thief among the other beaten horses. Santos commented "I hope he gets a little credit now. After the Belmont all eyes were on Charismatic but Lemon Drop Kid won the race. He had to prove he's the real deal. In my heart he's one of the best".

In 2000 Edgar Prado took over from Santos as Lemon Drop Kid's regular jockey. He recorded Grade I wins in the Brooklyn Handicap, Suburban Handicap, Whitney Handicap, and Woodward Stakes. At the end of the year he was named U.S. Champion Older Male Horse.

== Stud career ==
Lemon Drop Kid was retired to stud at Lane's End Farm in Versailles, Kentucky, where he stood for his entire career.

His first crop of foals in 2005 produced three stakes winners. His second crop in 2006 produced three more stakes winners, including the filly Lemons Forever, the longshot winner of the 2006 Kentucky Oaks. Other Grade I winners have included Somali Lemonade, Richard's Kid (Pacific Classic), Cannock Chase (Canadian International Stakes), Beach Patrol (Arlington Million, Joe Hirsch Turf Classic), Lemon Pop (February Stakes) and Santa Teresita (Santa Maria Handicap).

Through his daughter Lemons Forever, Lemon Drop Kid is the broodmare sire of multiple Grade I winner Forever Unbridled and Grade I winner Unbridled Forever.

Lemon Drop Kid was pensioned from stud duty in 2021.

== Notable progeny ==
Below data is based on Racing Post stallion records. c = colt, f = filly, g = gelding

Foaled	Name	Sex	Notable Wins
2003	Citronnade	f	Dahlia Handicap, Beverly Hills Handicap, Santa Ana Handicap, San Gorgonio Handicap
2003	Lemons Forever	f	Kentucky Oaks
2003	Kiss the Kid	c	Appleton Stakes, Cliff Hanger Stakes
2003	Bear's Kid	c	Summer Stakes
2003	Malakoff	c	Marine Stakes
2004	Santa Teresita	f	Santa Maria Handicap
2004	Christmas Kid	f	Davona Dale Stakes, Ashland Stakes
2005	Richard's Kid	c	Cougar II Stakes (twice), Goodwood Stakes, San Antonio Handicap, Pacific Classic Stakes (twice),
2005	Bronze Cannon	c	Hardwicke Stakes, Jockey Club Stakes
2006	Charitable Man	c	Peter Pan Stakes
2008	Pisco Sour	g	Prix Eugène Adam, Tercentenary Stakes
2008	Wilkinson	c	Lecomte Stakes, American Handicap
2008	Hangover Kid	c	Bowling Green Stakes,
2008	Lake Drop	c	Premio Carlo d'Alessio
2009	Somali Lemonade	f	Diana Stakes, Gallorette Handicap, Jessamine Stakes, Dr. James Penny Memorial Stakes
2010	Balance the Books	c	Bourbon Stakes, With Anticipation Stakes
2010	Kid Dreams	c	Hawthorne Derby
2010	Lemon Drop Dream	c	Count Fleet Sprint Handicap
2011	Cannock Chase	c	Huxley Stakes, Canadian International Stakes, Tercentenary Stakes
2011	Da Big Hoss	c	Kentucky Turf Cup (twice), American St. Leger Stakes, Elkhorn Stakes, John B. Connally Turf Cup,
2011	Kid Cruz	c	Excelsior Stakes, Dwyer Stakes
2011	Sparkling Review	f	Mrs. Revere Stakes, Pin Oak Valley View Stakes
2012	Romantic Vision	f	Spinster Stakes, Locust Grove Stakes,
2012	Itsaknockout	c	Fountain of Youth Stakes
2013	Beach Patrol	c	Joe Hirsch Turf Classic Stakes, Arlington Million, Secretariat Stakes
2013	Red Verdon	g	Prix Maurice de Nieuil, John Smith's Silver Cup Stakes
2013	Funny Kid	c	Prix de Barbeville
2016	Value Engineering	g	Mac Diarmida Stakes
2017	Field Pass	c	Seabiscuit Handicap, Baltimore Washington International Turf Cup, Ontario Derby, Jeff Ruby Steaks
2018	Lemon Pop	c	Champions Cup (twice), Mile Championship Nambu Hai, February Stakes, Negishi Stakes
2018	Henrietta Topham	f	Mint Julep Stakes

== Pedigree ==
Pedigree of Lemon Drop Kid (USA), bay stallion, 1996
Sire Kingmambo (USA) 1990	Mr. Prospector (USA); 1970	Raise a Native	Native Dancer
Sire Kingmambo (USA) 1990	Mr. Prospector (USA); 1970	Raise a Native	Raise You
Sire Kingmambo (USA) 1990	Mr. Prospector (USA); 1970	Gold Digger	Nashua
Sire Kingmambo (USA) 1990	Mr. Prospector (USA); 1970	Gold Digger	Sequence
Sire Kingmambo (USA) 1990	Miesque (USA); 1984	Nureyev	Northern Dancer
Sire Kingmambo (USA) 1990	Miesque (USA); 1984	Nureyev	Special
Sire Kingmambo (USA) 1990	Miesque (USA); 1984	Pasadoble	Prove Out
Sire Kingmambo (USA) 1990	Miesque (USA); 1984	Pasadoble	Santa Quilla
Dam Charming Lassie (USA) 1987	Seattle Slew (USA); 1974	Bold Reasoning	Boldnesian
Dam Charming Lassie (USA) 1987	Seattle Slew (USA); 1974	Bold Reasoning	Reason To Earn
Dam Charming Lassie (USA) 1987	Seattle Slew (USA); 1974	My Charmer	Poker
Dam Charming Lassie (USA) 1987	Seattle Slew (USA); 1974	My Charmer	Fair Charmer
Dam Charming Lassie (USA) 1987	Lassie Dear (USA); 1974	Buckpasser	Tom Fool
Dam Charming Lassie (USA) 1987	Lassie Dear (USA); 1974	Buckpasser	Busanda
Dam Charming Lassie (USA) 1987	Lassie Dear (USA); 1974	Gay Missile	Sir Gaylord
Dam Charming Lassie (USA) 1987	Lassie Dear (USA); 1974	Gay Missile	Missy Baba (Family: 3-l)
