= 1999 Cheltenham Gold Cup =

Historic horse race

The 1999 Cheltenham Gold Cup was a horse race which took place at Cheltenham on Thursday March 18, 1999. It was the 72nd running of the Cheltenham Gold Cup, and it was won by See More Business. The winner was ridden by Mick Fitzgerald and trained by Paul Nicholls. The pre-race favourite Florida Pearl finished third.

The jockey-trainer partnership of Fitzgerald and Nicholls completed a big-race double, as they had also won the previous day's Queen Mother Champion Chase with Call Equiname.

== Race details ==
- Sponsor: Tote
- Winner's prize money: £149,600.00
- Going: Good to Soft
- Number of runners: 12
- Winner's time: 6m 41.9s

== Full result ==
| | * | Horse | Age | Jockey | Trainer ^{†} | SP |
| 1 | | See More Business | 9 | Mick Fitzgerald | Paul Nicholls | 16/1 |
| 2 | 1 | Go Ballistic | 10 | Tony Dobbin | David Nicholson | 66/1 |
| 3 | 17 | Florida Pearl | 7 | Richard Dunwoody | Willie Mullins (IRE) | 5/2 fav |
| 4 | 14 | Double Thriller | 9 | Joe Tizzard | Paul Nicholls | 9/1 |
| 5 | 3½ | Addington Boy | 11 | Adrian Maguire | Ferdy Murphy | 66/1 |
| 6 | 12 | Simply Dashing | 8 | Lorcan Wyer | Tim Easterby | 20/1 |
| 7 | nk | Escartefigue | 7 | Richard Johnson | David Nicholson | 11/1 |
| 8 | 12 | Dorans Pride | 10 | Paul Carberry | Michael Hourigan (IRE) | 11/2 |
| 9 | 29 | Senor El Betrutti | 10 | Carl Llewellyn | Susan Nock | 50/1 |
| PU | Fence 21 | Suny Bay | 10 | Graham Bradley | Simon Sherwood | 14/1 |
| PU | Fence 14 | Unsinkable Boxer | 10 | Tony McCoy | Martin Pipe | 14/1 |
| PU | Fence 10 | Teeton Mill | 10 | Norman Williamson | Venetia Williams | 7/2 |

* The distances between the horses are shown in lengths or shorter. nk = neck; PU = pulled-up.
† Trainers are based in Great Britain unless indicated.

== Winner's details ==
Further details of the winner, See More Business:

- Foaled: April 26, 1990, in Ireland
- Sire: Seymour Hicks; Dam: Miss Redlands (Dubassoff)
- Owner: Paul Barber and John Keighley
- Breeder: Ian Bryant
