= Donald L. Howard =

American jockey

Donald L. Howard (born in Ft. Collins, Colorado) is a retired American jockey in Thoroughbred horse racing.

== Early life ==
He is the son of John and Sandra Howard. Unlike many jockeys, Don did not grow up around the race track. After his father, a veterinarian, purchased a horse trailer from a trainer in Juarez, Mexico, Don was given the opportunity to work as an exercise rider as a summer job. He continued as an exercise rider until he signed a contract with the trainer and began his horse racing career when he was 16 years old. He was the leading rider at Ruidoso Downs, New Mexico as a senior in high school.

== Career ==
Don has raced throughout the United States and spent significant time at Oaklawn Park in Hot Springs, Arkansas where in 1991 he rode five winners on a single racecard. He also competed at Louisiana Downs (Shreveport, Louisiana) as well as in Chicago, New York and Kentucky. Howard was the leading rider at Louisiana Downs for several consecutive years in the late 1980s.

As is the case with most jockeys, Don Howard experienced several serious injuries. In 1993, he suffered a nearly fatal accident while racing at Louisiana Downs. In the final stretch riding Police Cat, the horse broke its leg resulting in the horse falling into a somersault. Don was able to untangle himself from his horse only to be trampled by an apprentice's horse that was several lengths behind. Don was unconscious for nearly an hour and initially was not expected to survive. He suffered his fourth severe concussion in six months and had a compound fracture of his right humerus, the same arm that was nearly amputated when he was 14 due to a hay equipment accident. In 1994, Don Howard attempted to return to horse racing, only to discover that the fractured humerus had not healed. The non-union fracture required several additional surgeries.

In 1997, Howard returned to horse racing in New Mexico and then back to Oaklawn Park. His circuit eventually included Prairie Meadows Racetrack in Altoona, Iowa. Don Howard was very successful at Prairie Meadows and was consistently in the top 3 jockeys in the number of wins as well as earnings.

He never officially retired, but has not raced since 2002.

== Horse racing milestones ==
- 1989 Kentucky Derby on Irish Actor
- Super Derby X
- Super Derby XII
- Won 5 races during the Arkansas Derby Day
