= Menifee =

American-bred Thoroughbred racehorse

- Sire: Harlan
- Grandsire: Storm Cat
- Dam: Anne Campbell
- Damsire: Never Bend
- Sex: Stallion
- Foaled: May 4, 1996
- Died: June 13, 2019 (aged 23)
- Country: United States
- Colour: Bay
- Breeder: Arthur B. Hancock III
- Owner: Arthur B. Hancock III & James Stone
- Trainer: W. Elliott Walden
- Record: 11: 5-4-1
- Earnings: $1,732,000

Major wins
- Blue Grass Stakes (1999); Haskell Invitational Handicap (1999); American Classic Race placing: Kentucky Derby 2nd (1999); Preakness Stakes 2nd (1999)
- Last updated on June 13, 2019

Menifee (May 4, 1996 – June 13, 2019) was an American Thoroughbred racehorse that competed in the Triple Crown of Thoroughbred Racing in 1999. His rivalry with Triple Crown contender Charismatic was compared at times with the rivalry between 1978 contenders Affirmed and Alydar, who won and placed respectively in all three races that year. He was trained by W. Elliott Walden and ridden in all three races by Pat Day.

== Triple Crown run ==
Menifee won a come-from-behind victory in the Blue Grass Stakes at Keeneland in his last Triple Crown prep over the highly regarded Cat Thief, Vicar, Kimberlite Pipe and Wondertross. With Pat Day riding and coming from far behind, he then placed second with a big late run just coming up a neck short in the Kentucky Derby behind eventual Horse of the Year Charismatic. Two weeks later, in the 1999 Preakness Stakes, he garnered a great deal of support, being sent off as the morning line favorite at 2–1 in a full field of 13 colts and 1 filly (Silverbulletday). In the race, Cat Thief and Vicar took the lead early while Menifee settled into mid-pack at eighth and Charismatic lagged behind in tenth. Around the second turn, Charismatic made a move on the outside and won by 1 1/2 lengths. Menifee passed Cat Thief and Badge to claim the runner-up share of $200,000 in the Preakness Stakes.

Menifee failed to place in the top three in the Belmont Stakes. It was the only time he finished out of the money at age three.

== Late three-year-old season ==
Following the Triple Crown series in the summer of 1999, Menifee won the Grade I Haskell Invitational Handicap at Monmouth Park Racetrack, finished second in the Super Derby, and ran third in the Travers Stakes. He was retired from racing with 5 wins, 4 places and one show in 11 starts; two of those wins were as a two-year-old in 1998.

== Retirement ==
Menifee started his stallion career at Stone Farm, where he commanded US$15,000 for a live cover breeding. In October 2006, it was announced that he had been sold to the Korean Racing Association to continue his stallion career at Jeju Stud Farm. He was the leading sire in South Korea from 2012 to 2019 and became a favorite of Korean racing fans. The horse reportedly quickly learned to respond to Korean phrases, which led Jeju staff to frequently remark that "Menifee speaks Korean."

Menifee died of a heart attack on June 13, 2019, at the age of 23.
