= 1999 Preakness Stakes =

124th running of the Preakness Stakes

124th Preakness Stakes
- The Preakness Stakes
- "The Middle Jewel of the Triple Crown" "The Run for the Black-Eyed Susans"
- Location: Pimlico Race Course, Baltimore, Maryland, United States
- Date: May 15, 1999
- Winning horse: Charismatic
- Jockey: Chris Antley
- Trainer: D. Wayne Lukas
- Conditions: Fast
- Surface: Dirt

The 1999 Preakness Stakes was the 124th running of the Preakness Stakes thoroughbred horse race. The race took place on May 15, 1999, and was televised in the United States on the ABC television network. Charismatic, who was jockeyed by Chris Antley, won the race by one and one half lengths over runner-up Menifee. Approximate post time was 5:28 p.m. Eastern Time. The race was run over a fast track in a final time of 1:55.32. The Maryland Jockey Club reported total attendance of 116,526, this is recorded as second highest on the list of American thoroughbred racing top attended events for North America in 1999.

== Payout ==
The 126th Preakness Stakes Payout Schedule

Program Number	Horse Name	Win	Place	Show
6	Charismatic	$18.80	$7.60	$5.80
5	Menifee	-	$3.60	$3.20
4	Badge	-	-	$18.80

- $2 Exacta: (6–5) paid $47.60
- $2 Trifecta: (6–5–4) paid $2,049.80
- $1 Superfecta: (6–5–4–11) paid $18,887.60

== The full chart ==
Finish Position	Margin (lengths)	Post Position	Horse name	Jockey	Trainer	Owner	Post Time Odds	Purse Earnings
1st	0	6	Charismatic	Chris Antley	D. Wayne Lukas	Robert B. Lewis	8.40-1	$650,000
2nd	1 1/2	5	Menifee	Pat Day	W. Elliott Walden	Arthur B. Hancock III	2.00-1 favorite	$200,000
3rd	1 3/4	4	Badge	Mike Luzzi	Joseph A. Aquilino	Southbelle Stable	58.00-1	$100,000
4th	3-1/4	11	Stephen Got Even	Gary Stevens	Nicholas P. Zito	Stephen C. Hilbert	11.00-1	$50,000
5th	5-1/4	8	Patience Game	Corey Nakatani	Alex L. Hassinger Jr.	The Thoroughbred Corporation	15.60-1	
6th	5 3/4	9	Adonis	Jorge Chavez	Nicholas P. Zito	Paraneck Stable	19.80-1	
7th	9	3	Cat Thief	Mike E. Smith	D. Wayne Lukas	Overbrook Farm	5.20-1	
8th	9 3/4	2	Kimberlite Pipe	Shane Sellers	Dallas Stewart	John D. Gunther	17.40-1	
9th	18	12	Valhol	Edgar Prado	Dallas E. Keen	James D. Jackson	61.70-1	
10th	19	13	Vicar	Robby Albarado	Carl Nafzger	James B. Tafel	24.00-1	
11th	24 3/4	1	Torrid Sand	Timothy T. Doocy	Randy L. Morse	Mike Langford	102.80-1	
12th	34 1/2	10	Worldly Manner	Jerry Bailey	Saeed Bin Suroor	Godolphin Racing	5.30-1	
13th	dnf	7	Excellent Meeting	Kent Desormeaux	Bob Baffert	Golden Eagle Farm	6.60-1	
14th	scr	scr	Silverbulletday	Scratch	Bob Baffert	Michael E. Pegram	scr	

- Winning Breeder: William Stamps Farish III & Parrish Hill Farm; (KY)
- Final Time: 1:55.32
- Track Condition: Fast
- Total Attendance: 116,526

== See also ==
- 1999 Kentucky Derby
- 1999 Belmont Stakes
