= Charismatic (horse) =

American-bred Thoroughbred racehorse

- Charismatic's grave at Old Friends Equine
- Sire: Summer Squall
- Grandsire: Storm Bird
- Dam: Bali Babe
- Damsire: Drone
- Sex: Stallion
- Foaled: March 13, 1996
- Died: February 19, 2017 (aged 20)
- Country: United States
- Color: Chestnut
- Breeder: Parrish Hill Farm & William S. Farish
- Owner: Bob and Beverly Lewis
- Trainer: D. Wayne Lukas
- Record: 17: 5-2-4
- Earnings: $2,038,064

Major wins
- Lexington Stakes (1999); U.S. Triple Crown wins: Kentucky Derby (1999); Preakness Stakes (1999)

Awards
- U.S. Champion 3-Year-Old Colt (1999); American Horse of the Year (1999); NTRA "Moment of the Year" (1999)

Charismatic (March 13, 1996 – February 19, 2017) was an American Thoroughbred racehorse best known for winning the first two legs of the Triple Crown of Thoroughbred Racing in 1999.

Early in his career, Charismatic was entered in claiming races but he improved rapidly during his three-year-old year. After winning the 1999 Kentucky Derby and Preakness Stakes, Charismatic had the lead in the stretch of the Belmont Stakes before suddenly falling back and finishing third. He was quickly pulled up by jockey Chris Antley, who dismounted and cradled the horse's fractured foreleg to prevent further injury. The aftermath of the Belmont was later named the National Thoroughbred Racing Association Moment of the Year.

Charismatic never raced again, and was still voted as the 1999 Horse of the Year. He successfully recovered from his injuries to become a stallion, first in the United States and then in Japan. On October 26, 2016, it was announced that Charismatic was being retired from stud to live at Old Friends Equine near Lexington, Kentucky. He died just over two months after arriving.

== Background ==
Charismatic was a chestnut horse with four white stockings on his legs and a white stripe on his forehead. He was bred under a foal-sharing arrangement between William S. Farish and the Parrish Hill Farm of Dr. Ben and Tom Roach. His sire was Summer Squall, who had won the 1990 Preakness Stakes. Summer Squall was a half-brother to leading sire A.P. Indy as both were out of the outstanding broodmare Weekend Surprise by Secretariat. Summer Squall's sire Storm Bird, by Northern Dancer, was also the sire of Storm Cat, another leading sire. Charismatic's dam was Bali Babe, by Drone. Bali Babe, winless in two starts, was 16 when she foaled Charismatic, a fairly advanced age for a broodmare.

Charismatic was purchased as a weanling by Bob and Beverly Lewis for $200,000. He was trained by D. Wayne Lukas and ridden in the Triple Crown races by Chris Antley.

== Racing career ==
Charismatic lost his first five starts as a two-year-old. Lukas then took a calculated risk by entering him in a maiden claiming race on November 21, 1998, with a "tag" of $62,500. Lukas later commented, "I don't think I've ever been fooled so much by a horse... I felt I wasn't pushing the right buttons. But I felt he hadn't won a race and needed some confidence." The gamble paid off when the colt won the race and went unclaimed.

Charismatic raced once more as a two-year-old, losing in allowance company, and started his three-year-old season the same way, finishing fifth in both an allowance race and the Santa Catalina Stakes. Lukas then entered the colt in another claiming race on February 11, 1999. "Quite frankly I had given up on the horse," said Bob Lewis. "I wanted to get back as much of that $200,000 (purchase price) as I could. The reason he was in that race was because Wayne wanted him to see what it was like on the front end instead of the back end." Again unclaimed, Charismatic finished second but was given the win when the first-place finisher was disqualified.

Lukas raced the colt eight days later on February 19 in an allowance, followed by a start on March 6 in the El Camino Real Derby. Charismatic finished second in both races and then was fourth in the Santa Anita Derby on April 6. Lukas shipped the horse to Keeneland for the Lexington Stakes on April 18, the last chance for a win on the Kentucky Derby trail. Charismatic responded with a record-setting performance in his first stakes victory.

Charismatic was a 31-1 longshot in the 125th Kentucky Derby on May 1, facing a field of 18 other horses. Valhol set a slow early pace tracked by Cat Thief, who took over the lead rounding the final turn. Charismatic raced in mid-pack for the first three-quarters of a mile, then started closing ground rapidly on the leaders. He passed Cat Thief in deep stretch and withstood a late charge from Menifee to win by a head. Cat Thief, also trained by Lukas, was third. The time for 1 1/4 miles was a slow 2:03.29 The win denied trainer Bob Baffert his third straight Derby victory. His three entries, two of which were co-favorites at 9-2 odds, failed to make the top three.

Charismatic also won the 124th Preakness Stakes on May 15 with a time of 1:55.20 for the 1 3/16-mile distance. He was 1½ lengths ahead of Menifee, again second, with Badge finishing third. Despite the Kentucky Derby win, Charismatic was not the Preakness favorite, posting 8-1 odds. Menifee was the favorite at 5–2.

At the 131st Belmont Stakes on June 5, Charismatic was the 2-1 favorite, with Menifee second at odds of 7–2. The rivalry between Charismatic and Menifee was compared to Affirmed and Alydar in 1978. Charismatic looked like he would become the first horse in 21 years to win the Triple Crown, taking the lead at the 3/16ths pole. However, the horse abruptly slowed and lost the lead to eventual winner Lemon Drop Kid with 1/8 mile to go, finishing third behind second-place Vision and Verse.

Sensing that something was wrong with the horse, jockey Chris Antley eased Charismatic up in the final furlong, jumped off right after the finish line, and held up the colt's left front leg. Charismatic's foreleg had fractured in multiple places involving the cannon bone and sesamoids, and Antley's actions probably saved his life by avoiding a more catastrophic injury. As it was, the horse was taken off the track in a van and underwent surgery the next day. His surgeon Stephen Selway said, "The fracture [of the cannon bone] happened first. As the horse went on, the damaged piece hit the sesamoids and caused them to fracture." The damaged area of the cannon bone extended about six inches: four screws were inserted to provide stability. There was no sign of pre-existing injury.

The footage of a tearful Antley holding Charismatic was selected by racing fans as the 1999 National Thoroughbred Racing Association Moment of the Year.

Charismatic finished his career with 5 wins, 2 places, and 4 shows in 17 career starts for total earnings of $2,038,064. He won the Eclipse Awards for 3-year-old Colt of the Year and Overall Horse of the Year for 1999.

== Retirement ==
In 2000, Charismatic entered stud at Lane's End Farm in Kentucky. After the 2002 season, he was shipped to Japan, where he stood at the JBBA's Shizunai Stallion Station. His fee was ¥500,000 (about $5,000) for a live foal. At the time of his retirement from stud in October 2016, Charismatic had sired 371 starters from 424 foals of racing age and 263 winners who had combined earnings of more than $44.5 million. His best runner in the United States was Sun King, who won four graded stakes and earned more than $2.2 million. In Japan, his most successful offspring was Wonder Acute, a multiple group stakes winner.

On October 26, 2016, it was announced that Charismatic would be retired from stud and would reside at Old Friends Equine near Lexington, Kentucky. Charismatic died on the morning of February 19, 2017 at Old Friends due to severe bleeding caused by a pelvic fracture.

A film about Charismatic and Chris Antley was produced by Asylum Entertainment and directed by Steven Michaels, Joel Surnow, and Jonathan Kochas for ESPN's 30 for 30 series. It aired on Tuesday, October 18, 2011, at 8 p.m.

== Pedigree ==
Pedigree of Charismatic, chestnut horse, 1996
Sire Summer Squall bay 1987	Storm Bird bay 1978	Northern Dancer bay 1961	Nearctic
Sire Summer Squall bay 1987	Storm Bird bay 1978	Northern Dancer bay 1961	Natalma
Sire Summer Squall bay 1987	Storm Bird bay 1978	South Ocean bay 1967	New Providence
Sire Summer Squall bay 1987	Storm Bird bay 1978	South Ocean bay 1967	Shining Sun
Sire Summer Squall bay 1987	Weekend Surprise bay 1980	Secretariat chestnut 1970	Bold Ruler
Sire Summer Squall bay 1987	Weekend Surprise bay 1980	Secretariat chestnut 1970	Somethingroyal
Sire Summer Squall bay 1987	Weekend Surprise bay 1980	Lassie Dear bay 1974	Buckpasser
Sire Summer Squall bay 1987	Weekend Surprise bay 1980	Lassie Dear bay 1974	Gay Missile
Dam Bali Babe chestnut 1980	Drone gray 1966	Sir Gaylord dark brown 1959	Turn-To
Dam Bali Babe chestnut 1980	Drone gray 1966	Sir Gaylord dark brown 1959	Somethingroyal
Dam Bali Babe chestnut 1980	Drone gray 1966	Cap and Bells gray 1958	Tom Fool
Dam Bali Babe chestnut 1980	Drone gray 1966	Cap and Bells gray 1958	Ghazni
Dam Bali Babe chestnut 1980	Polynesian Charm bay 1972	What a Pleasure chestnut 1965	Bold Ruler
Dam Bali Babe chestnut 1980	Polynesian Charm bay 1972	What a Pleasure chestnut 1965	Grey Flight
Dam Bali Babe chestnut 1980	Polynesian Charm bay 1972	Grass Shack black 1951	Polynesian
Dam Bali Babe chestnut 1980	Polynesian Charm bay 1972	Grass Shack black 1951	Good Example

== See also ==
- List of racehorses
