= 1990 Preakness Stakes =

115th running of the Preakness Stakes

115th Preakness Stakes
- The Preakness Stakes
- Location: Pimlico Race Course, Baltimore, Maryland, United States
- Date: May 19, 1990
- Winning horse: Summer Squall
- Jockey: Pat Day
- Trainer: Neil Howard
- Conditions: Fast
- Surface: Dirt

The 1990 Preakness Stakes was the 115th running of the Preakness Stakes thoroughbred horse race. The race took place on May 19, 1990, and was televised in the United States on the ABC television network. Summer Squall, who was jockeyed by Pat Day, won the race by 2 1/4 lengths over runner-up Unbridled. Approximate post time was 5:33 p.m. Eastern Time. The race was run over a fast track in a final time of 1:53-3/5. The Maryland Jockey Club reported total attendance of 96,106, this is recorded as second highest on the list of American thoroughbred racing top attended events for North America in 1990.

== Payout ==
The 115th Preakness Stakes Payout Schedule

Program number	Horse name	Win	Place	Show
7	Summer Squall	US$6.80	$3.00	$2.60
6	Unbridled	-	$3.00	$2.80
9	Mister Frisky	-	-	$3.40

$2 Exacta: (7–6) paid $13.00

$2 Trifecta: (7-6–9) paid $46.80

== The full chart ==
Finish position	Margin (lengths)	Post position	Horse name	Jockey	Trainer	Owner	Post time odds	Purse earnings
1st	0	7	Summer Squall	Pat Day	Neil Howard	Dogwood Stable	2.40-1	$445,900
2nd	21/4	6	Unbridled	Craig Perret	Carl Nafzger	Frances A. Genter	1.70-1 favorite	$137,200
3rd	111/4	9	Mister Frisky	Gary Stevens	Laz Barrera	Solymar Stud	2.50-1	$68,600
4th	143/4	1	Music Prospector	Frank Olivares	Steve Miyadi	Silky Green, Inc.	61.10-1	$34,300
5th	163/4	5	Fighting Notion	Alberto Delgado	Nancy B. Heil	Arlene E. Kushner	35.50-1	
6th	17	2	Land Rush	Ángel Cordero Jr.	D. Wayne Lukas	Lukas & Overbrook Farm	9.60-1	
7th	171/4	4	Kentucky Jazz	Kent Desormeaux	D. Wayne Lukas	Lloyd R. French Jr.	11.10-1	
8th	19	3	Baron de Vaux	Joe Rocco	Charles Peoples	Bayard Sharp	37.00-1	
8th	19 3/4	8	J. R.'s Horizon	Mark T. Johnston	Meredith Bailes	Marvin A. Champion	74.40-1	

- Winning Breeder: William Stamps Farish III; (KY)
- Final Time: 1:53.60
- Track Condition: Fast
- Total Attendance: 96,106

== See also ==
- 1990 Kentucky Derby
