= New Providence (horse) =

Canadian-bred Thoroughbred racehorse

- Sire: Bull Page
- Grandsire: Bull Lea
- Dam: Fair Colleen
- Damsire: Preciptic
- Sex: Stallion
- Foaled: 1956
- Country: Canada
- Colour: Bay
- Breeder: E. P. Taylor
- Owner: Windfields Farm
- Trainer: Gordon J. McCann
- Record: 41: 10-7-10
- Earnings: $129,972

Major wins
- Cup and Saucer Stakes (1958); Seagram Cup Handicap (1959); Ultimus Handicap (1961); Canadian Triple Crown wins: Queen's Plate (1959); Prince of Wales Stakes (1959); Breeders' Stakes (1959)

Awards
- 6th Canadian Triple Crown Champion (1959)

Honours
- Canadian Horse Racing Hall of Fame (1982); New Providence Stakes at Woodbine Racetrack
- Last updated on September 20, 2020

New Providence (1956–1981) is a Thoroughbred racehorse who in 1959 became the first official winner of the Canadian Triple Crown.

Retired to stud duty at owner E. P. Taylor's Windfields Farm in Oshawa, Ontario, New Providence sired a number of good runners of which his daughter South Ocean, a Canadian Oaks winner, would prove to be the most significant. A Canadian Hall of Fame inductee herself, South Ocean was the dam of Canadian Hall of Fame inductees Northernette and Storm Bird, the latter in turn the sire of Storm Cat.

New Providence died in 1981 and is buried at Windfields Farm. In 1982 he was inducted into the Canadian Horse Racing Hall of Fame and Woodbine Racetrack created the New Providence Stakes in his honour.
