= Answer Lively =

American Thoroughbred racehorse

- Sire: Lively One
- Grandsire: Halo
- Dam: Twosies Answer
- Damsire: Two's a Plenty
- Sex: Stallion
- Foaled: 1996
- Country: United States
- Colour: Bay
- Breeder: John A. Franks
- Owner: John A. Franks
- Trainer: Bobby C. Barnett
- Record: 14: 4-4-0
- Earnings: $938,296

Major wins
- Sport of Kings Futurity (1998) Breeders' Cup wins: Breeders' Cup Juvenile (1998)

Awards
- American Champion Two-Year-Old Colt (1998)
- Last updated on October 6, 2007

Answer Lively (1996–2003) was an American Champion Thoroughbred racehorse owned and bred by John Franks, a Louisiana oilman and winner of a record four Eclipse Awards for Outstanding Owner.

Trained by Bobby Barnett, at age two Answer Lively made seven starts, winning four and finishing second once. He won the Sport of Kings Futurity at Louisiana Downs and was second in the Breeders' Futurity Stakes at Keeneland Race Course before capturing the most important win of his career. The colt gave owner John Franks his first ever Breeders' Cup winner when jockey Jerry Bailey rode him to victory in the Breeders' Cup Juvenile. His 1998 performances earned Answer Lively the Eclipse Award as the American Champion Two-Year-Old Colt.

At age three, Answer Lively raced seven more times, earning three seconds but without a win. In that year's Kentucky Derby he finished tenth then started two more times before being injured. After an eight-month layoff, in June 2000 his owner announced the colt was being retired from racing due to a hairline fracture to a sesamoid in his left front leg. Under a partnership agreement with the Hill 'n' Dale Farms Lexington, Kentucky breeding farm, he was to stand there at stud in 2001. However, fertility problems led to Answer Lively being treated at John Franks Southland Division near Ocala, Florida. Unsuccessful, he was pensioned without ever siring any offspring and sent to live at Twin Oaks Farm near Murchison, Texas.

In October 2003, Answer Lively's owner announced that the seven-year-old horse had died of a heart attack nearly six months earlier on April 28, 2003, and was buried at Twin Oaks.
