= Chris Antley =

American jockey (1966–2000)

Personal information
- Born: January 6, 1966 Fort Lauderdale, Florida, United States
- Died: December 2, 2000 (aged 34) Pasadena, California, United States
- Occupation: Jockey

Horse racing career
- Sport: Horse racing
- Career wins: 3,480

Major racing wins
- Cornhusker Handicap (1987); Gazelle Handicap (1987); Bold Ruler Handicap (1988, 1990); Gotham Stakes (1988); Lawrence Realization Stakes (1988); Manhattan Handicap (1988); Monmouth Oaks (1988); Oceanport Handicap (1988); Violet Handicap (1988); Wood Memorial Stakes (1988); Excelsior Breeders' Cup Handicap (1990); Carter Handicap (1990); Morris Handicap (1990, 1991); Woodward Stakes (1990, 1999); Blue Grass Stakes (1991); Jamaica Handicap (1991); Hawthorne Gold Cup Handicap (1991); Morven Stakes (1991); Alabama Stakes (1992); Coaching Club American Oaks (1992); Futurity Stakes (1992); Garden City Breeders' Cup Handicap (1992); Mother Goose Stakes (1992); Hollywood Derby (1994); Santa Anita Handicap (1994); Acorn Stakes (1995); Las Virgenes Stakes (1996); Woodbine Mile (1997); Poker Handicap (1997); El Cajon Stakes (1999); Jockey Club Gold Cup (1999); Jerome Handicap (1999); Landaluce Stakes (1999) American Classic Race: Kentucky Derby (1991, 1999); Preakness Stakes (1999)

Racing awards
- United States Champion Jockey by wins (1985); NTRA "Moment of the Year" (1999)

Honors
- National Museum of Racing and Hall of Fame (2015)

Significant horses
- Strike the Gold, Charismatic, Forestry

Christopher Wiley Antley (January 6, 1966 – December 2, 2000) was an American National Champion and U.S. Racing Hall of Fame jockey.

== Biography ==
He was born in Fort Lauderdale, Florida, and grew up in Elloree, South Carolina. He left school at sixteen to ride horses professionally at Pimlico Race Course in Baltimore, Maryland. His first win was on a horse named Vaya Con Dinero. Soon, he left Maryland to race in New York and New Jersey and at the age of 18 was the United States Champion Jockey by wins with 469.

In the late 1980s, Antley spent time in a substance abuse clinic. In 1987, he became the first rider to win 9 races on 9 different horses in a single day and in 1989, he won at least one race a day for 64 straight days.

In 1990, Antley moved to California. In 1991, he rode Strike the Gold to victory in the Kentucky Derby. In 1997, he temporarily retired to deal with weight and drug problems. Then in 1999, Antley returned to ride the D. Wayne Lukas-trained Charismatic, and they won that year's Kentucky Derby and Preakness Stakes.

In the 1999 Belmont Stakes, Charismatic finished third after injuring his leg in the stretch run. Antley jumped off the horse after the finish line and attempted to hold him in place. Due in part to Antley's efforts, Charismatic recovered to stand at stud following surgery.

A stock market player, Antley wrote an investor newsletter he called "The Antman Report." During the week leading up to the 1999 Belmont Stakes, he was invited to ring the Opening Bell at the New York Stock Exchange.

In December 2000, Antley was found dead on the floor of his home in Pasadena, California. The cause of death was severe blunt force trauma and was investigated by police as a homicide. Later, the coroner's report concluded that Antley had died of multiple drug overdose, and the injuries were likely related to a fall caused by the drugs.

Antley is interred in the Bookhart Cemetery in Elloree, South Carolina, the town he considered his home. Shortly after his death, his wife, Natalie Jowett, a former ABC Sports employee, gave birth to their daughter, Violet Grace Antley.

On April 20, 2015, Antley's induction into the National Museum of Racing and Hall of Fame was announced. His formal induction took place during ceremonies on August 7, 2015, in Saratoga Springs, NY.

A film about Charismatic and Antley was produced by Asylum Entertainment and directed by Steven Michaels, Joel Surnow, and Jonathan Kochas for ESPN's 30 for 30 series. It aired on Tuesday, October 18, 2011, at 8 p.m.

== Triple Crown Record ==
Year	Kentucky Derby	Finish	Preakness	Finish	Belmont	Finish
1985	-	-	Skip Trial	9th	-	-
1988	Private Terms	9th	Private Terms	4th	-	-
1989	Shy Tom	10th	-	-	-	-
1989	-	-	Rock Point	3rd	Rock Point	6th
1990	-	-	-	-	Country Day	9th
1991	Strike the Gold	1st	Strike the Gold	6th	Strike the Gold	2nd
1992	Dance Floor	3rd	Dance Floor	4th	-	-
1993	-	-	-	-	Cherokee Run	6th
1994	Powis Castle	8th	-	-	-	-
1995	In Character (GB)	10th	-	-	-	-
1996	Louis Quatorze	16th	-	-	-	-
1999	Charismatic	1st	Charismatic	1st	Charismatic	3rd

Kentucky Derby: 8-2-0-1

Preakness: 6-1-0-1

Belmont: 5-0-1-1
