= Pat Day =

American jockey (born 1953)

- Pat Day at Keeneland in 2007

Personal information
- Born: October 13, 1953 (age 73) Brush, Colorado, United States
- Occupation: Jockey

Horse racing career
- Sport: Horse racing
- Career wins: 8,803

Major racing wins
- American Classics wins: Kentucky Derby (1992); Preakness Stakes (1985, 1990, 1994, 1995, 1996); Belmont Stakes (1989, 1994, 2000) Breeders' Cup wins: Breeders' Cup Classic (1984, 1990, 1998, 1999); Breeders' Cup Distaff (1986, 1991, 2001); Breeders' Cup Juvenile (1994, 1997); Breeders' Cup Juvenile Fillies (1987, 1994); Breeders' Cup Turf (1987) Major Stakes Wins: Jockey Club Gold Cup (1976, 1985, 1989); Test Stakes (1976, 1983, 2001); Go For Wand Handicap (1976, 1986, 1995, 2004); Travers Stakes (1983, 1987, 1989, 2003); Secretariat Stakes (1983, 1991, 1995); Spinster Stakes (1983, 1991, 1994, 1997, 2004); American Derby (1983, 1984, 1992); Arlington Classic (1983, 1984, 1990, 1993, 1995, 1996); Blue Grass Stakes (1984, 1990, 1999, 2000); Clark Handicap (1984, 1985, 1990, 2000); Ballerina Stakes (1984, 1994, 2000); Apple Blossom Handicap (1985, 1991, 1995); Stephen Foster Handicap (1985, 1998, 2003); Whitney Stakes (1986, 1987, 1989, 1995, 1998); Suburban Handicap (1986, 1988, 1990); Arkansas Derby (1986, 1987, 1997); Beldame Stakes (1986, 1994); Marlboro Cup (1987); Sword Dancer Stakes (1987, 1997, 2001, 2002); Humana Distaff Stakes (1987, 1988, 1989, 1990, 1991, 2001, 2004); Kentucky Oaks (1988, 2000); Champagne Stakes (1988, 1994); Super Derby (1988, 2003); Turf Classic Stakes (1988, 1994, 1996); Hollywood Gold Cup (1989); Wood Memorial (1989, 2002); United Nations Handicap (1989, 1992, 2002); Pimlico Special (1989, 1996); King's Bishop Stakes (1989, 1995, 2000); Hopeful Stakes (1989, 1997); Woodward Stakes (1989); Florida Derby (1990); Manhattan Handicap (1992, 1994); Spinaway Stakes (1992, 1994, 2002); Acorn Stakes (1992); Arlington Million (1994); Frizette Stakes (1994, 1998); Washington, D.C. International (1994); Personal Ensign Handicap (1995, 1998); Ogden Phipps Handicap (1995, 1998); Gazelle Handicap (1997, 1998, 2003); Haskell Invitational Stakes (1999); Swaps Stakes (1999); Starlet Stakes (1999); Queen Elizabeth II Challenge Cup (1999); Santa Anita Oaks (2000); Mother Goose Stakes (2000); Gulfstream Park Turf Handicap (2001); Garden City Handicap (2001, 2004); Alabama Stakes (2002); International race wins: Canadian Triple Crown (1991); Canadian International Stakes (1991, 1995); Woodbine Mile (1991, 2002)

Racing awards
- Eclipse Award for Outstanding Jockey (1984, 1986, 1987, 1991); U.S. Champion Jockey by wins (1982, 1983, 1984, 1986, 1990, 1991); U.S. Champion Jockey by earnings (1999, 2000); George Woolf Memorial Jockey Award (1985); Mike Venezia Memorial Award (1995); Big Sport of Turfdom Award (2005)

Honors
- National Museum of Racing and Hall of Fame (1991); Fair Grounds Racing Hall of Fame (1992); Arkansas Sports Hall of Fame (1999); Pat Day Mile Stakes at Churchill Downs; Statue at Churchill Downs

Significant horses
- Easy Goer, Awesome Again, Azeri, Cat Thief, Dance Smartly, Favorite Trick, Heavenly Prize, Lil E. Tee, Java Gold, Lady's Secret, Louis Quatorze, Paradise Creek, Seeking the Gold, Sky Classic, Summer Squall, Tabasco Cat, Tank's Prospect, Theatrical, Timber Country, Unbridled, Wild Again
- Updated on May 16, 2020

Patrick Alan "Pat" Day (born October 13, 1953, in Brush, Colorado) is a retired American jockey. He is a four-time winner of the Eclipse Award for Outstanding Jockey and was inducted into the National Museum of Racing and Hall of Fame in 1991 and the Arkansas Sports Hall of Fame in 1999. Day won 9 Triple Crown races and 12 Breeders' Cup races. He was once the leader for career Breeders' Cup wins though he was later surpassed as the events were expanded after he retired.

Pat Day retired in 2005 with 8,803 wins (ranked fourth all-time) and as the all-time leading jockey in money earned. He was a dominant rider on the Kentucky riding circuit and holds all of the career riding records at Churchill Downs and Keeneland. Day's signature wins include winning the inaugural $3 million Breeders' Cup Classic in 1984 aboard Wild Again and his partnership with Easy Goer in a rivalry with Sunday Silence.

== Technique ==
Pat Day was known for being a patient rider with gentle hands and for not using a horse more than he had to, but was sometimes criticized for waiting too long to make his move. Because Day often came with late runs in big spots and had a reputation for saving horse for the stretch he was given the nickname Patient Pat. As Pat Forde, a reporter for the Louisville Courier-Journal, wrote in 1995, "He is so patient he could watch a faucet drip for days". Day was also strong at taking horses to the lead as he did on Louis Quatorze in his 1996 Preakness victory and on Commendable in his 2000 Belmont Stakes win.

Day's riding style attracted considerable controversy over the years. Barry Irwin wrote in 2016 that he "drove many a captain of industry, hard-boot trainer and horseplayer to the brink of rage." D. Wayne Lukas, who won several Triple Crown races with Pat Day, once said "I'm only as good as Pat Day's rides." He is still criticized for costing Easy Goer a potential victory in the 1989 Preakness Stakes. Day said that Easy Goer was the best horse he ever rode. In 2016, he said, "As I re-run that race in my mind, I chastise myself pretty good because I feel I didn’t ride the best race of my career... Still, it was a great, great race. People still rave to me about the Preakness. They say it was the race of the century. I agree, except for the official order of finish."

== Riding career ==
Day learned to ride from his father, who owned a car repair shop in the ranching community of Brush, Colorado. "He taught me basic horsemanship that has been my foundation," Day said in a 1991 interview. "That has helped me tremendously in a roundabout way – being able to understand the temperament of the horse, and adjusting to get along with that." Day participated in rodeo events before beginning his jockey career in 1973 at Prescott Downs, a small racetrack in Arizona. He rode his first winner, Forblunged, on July 29, 1973. He became the leading jockey at Turf Paradise before relocating to Chicago, where he became the leading jockey at Hawthorne and Sportsman's Park. In 1976, he moved to the New York riding circuit. He recorded his first major victory that year in the Jockey Club Gold Cup aboard longshot Great Contractor.

Day was the leading jockey by number of wins in 1982, 1983, 1984, 1986, 1990, 1991. The first win in 1982 came only after Day chartered a plane on December 31 to Delta Downs, where he won two races on the evening card to surpass Angel Cordero Jr.'s tally by one.

Day rode winners of American Triple Crown races nine times, ranking him behind Eddie Arcaro's 17 wins in Triple Crown races as well as Bill Shoemaker's 11, while tied with Gary Stevens, Bill Hartack and Earl Sande's 9 each. However, Day had a comparatively poor Kentucky Derby record with only one win in twenty two tries. Some of Day's losses on top horses in the Kentucky Derby included Easy Goer, Forty Niner, Summer Squall, Demon's Begone, Corporate Report, Tabasco Cat, Timber Country, Favorite Trick, Ten Most Wanted and Menifee, who finished second behind Charismatic in both the Kentucky Derby and the Preakness Stakes. He had been the regular rider of 1990 Derby winner Unbridled but chose to ride Summer Squall in that race instead. Pat Day's first and only Kentucky Derby victory was in 1992 aboard longshot Lil E. Tee. On the day of that race, future Belmont Stakes and Breeders' Cup Classic winner A.P. Indy was forced to scratch from the race due to a foot injury. Arazi, the American Champion Two-Year-Old Colt and Breeders' Cup Juvenile winner, became the heavy favorite. Day rated behind Arazi in tenth place, hoping to follow his move and take second place. But when asked for run, Lil E. Tee responded by sweeping past Arazi for the win. "To say the least, it was very satisfying," said Day.

In 1991, Pat Day won the Canadian Triple Crown and the Breeders' Cup Distaff aboard the future Hall of Fame filly Dance Smartly. He is the only jockey to have ridden at least one mount in each of the first 20 Breeders' Cups, and at one point was the all-time leader in Breeders' Cup winners, with 12.

Day made his base in Kentucky, where he rode at Churchill Downs and Keeneland in the spring and fall. In the winter, he originally rode at Oaklawn Park in Arkansas, switching in the mid-1990s to Gulfstream Park. In the summer, he originally rode at Arlington Park, later switching to Saratoga. With the change in circuits, Day's number of wins decreased but his earnings increased. Day won his first earnings title in 1999, followed by another win in 2000 in a close battle with Jerry Bailey. Day finished 2000 with his mounts earning $17,479,838 in purses (recording 267 wins from 1,219 starts). Bailey finished with $17,468,690 in earnings.

=== Triple Crown top three finishes ===
Day recorded nine wins in the American Triple Crown plus ten second-place finishes and four thirds.

Kentucky Derby

- 1988 on Forty Niner (2nd)
- 1989 on Easy Goer (2nd)
- 1990 on Summer Squall (2nd)
- 1992 on Lil E. Tee (1st)
- 1995 on Timber Country (3rd)
- 1996 on Prince of Thieves (3rd)
- 1999 on Menifee (2nd)

Preakness Stakes

- 1985 on Tank's Prospect (1st)
- 1989 on Easy Goer (2nd)
- 1990 on Summer Squall (1st)
- 1991 on Corporate Report (2nd)
- 1993 on Cherokee Run (2nd)
- 1994 on Tabasco Cat (1st)
- 1995 on Timber Country (1st)
- 1996 on Louis Quatorze (1st)
- 1999 on Menifee (2nd)

Belmont Stakes

- 1984 on Pine Circle (2nd)
- 1987 on Gulch (3rd)
- 1989 on Easy Goer (1st)
- 1994 on Tabasco Cat (1st)
- 2000 on Commendable (1st)
- 2003 on Ten Most Wanted (2nd)
- 2004 on Royal Assault (3rd)

=== Breeders' Cup wins ===
Day won twelve Breeders' Cup races.

Breeders' Cup Classic

- 1984 on Wild Again
- 1990 on Unbridled
- 1998 on Awesome Again
- 1999 on Cat Thief

Breeders' Cup Distaff

- 1986 on Lady's Secret
- 1991 on Dance Smartly
- 2001 on Unbridled Elaine

Breeders' Cup Turf

- 1987 on Theatrical

Breeders' Cup Juvenile

- 1994 on Timber Country
- 1997 on Favorite Trick

Breeders' Cup Juvenile Fillies

- 1987 on Epitome
- 1994 on Flanders

== Records ==
Day is the all-time leading rider at Churchill Downs and Keeneland Race Course, the two largest tracks in his adopted home state of Kentucky. At Churchill Downs, he won 2,481 races including 155 stakes race wins, and earned 15 riding titles at the spring meeting plus 19 at the fall meeting. At Keeneland, he recorded 918 wins, 95 of which were in stakes races, and earned 22 leading rider titles. He also earned a record twelve jockey titles at Oaklawn Park.

On June 20, 1984, Day set a Churchill Downs record for the most wins on a single card when he won seven of eight races in which he rode. The record was tied in 2008 by Julien Leparoux. In 1989, he set a North American record when he won eight of nine mounts in a single day at Arlington Park.

== Honors ==
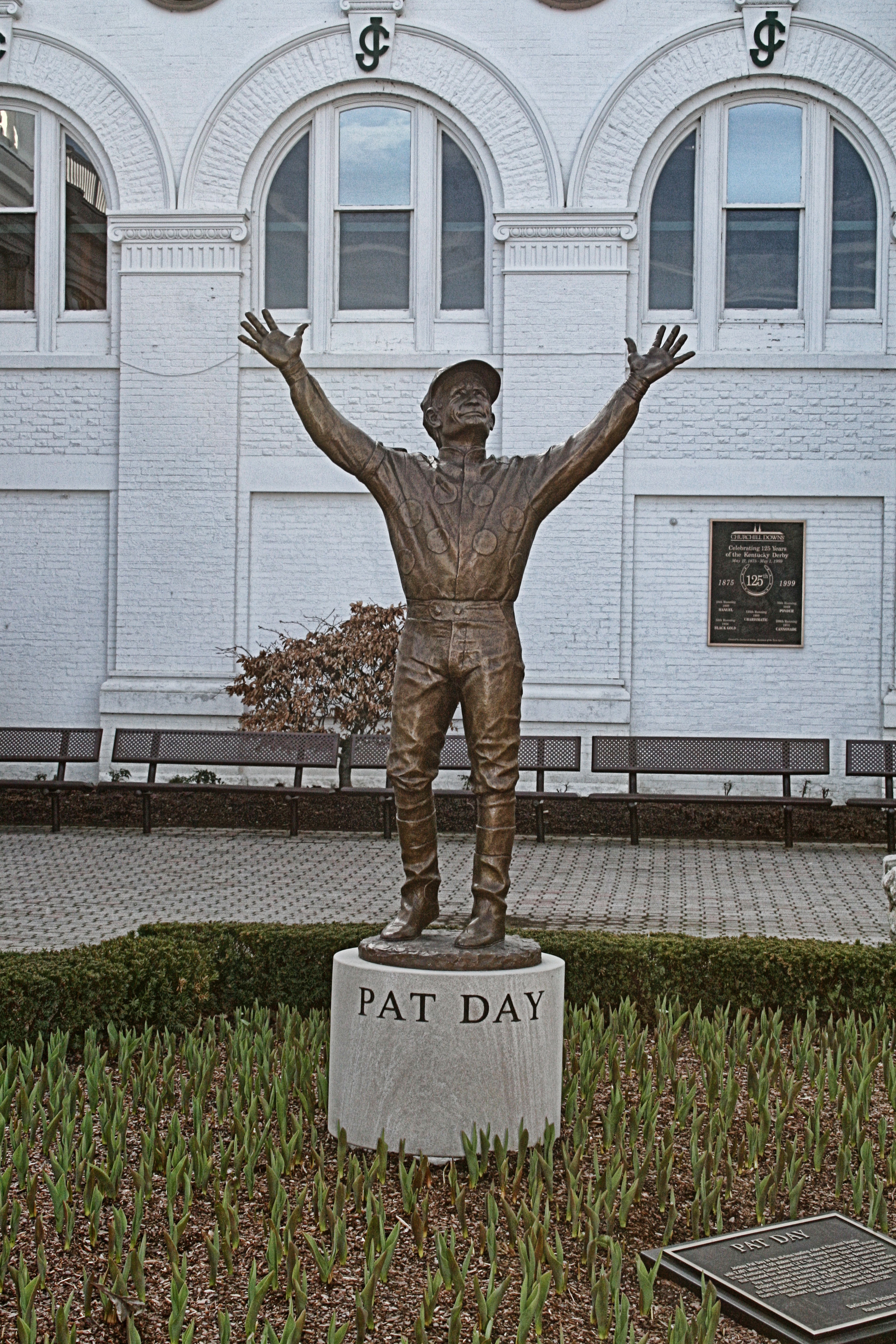
Statue of Day at Churchill Downs

Day earned the Eclipse Award for Outstanding Jockey in 1984, 1986, 1987 and 1991. In 1991, he was inducted into the National Museum of Racing and Hall of Fame. In 2006, a statue of him celebrating his win in the Kentucky Derby was unveiled at Churchill Downs. In 2015, Churchill Downs renamed the Derby Trial in his honor as the Pat Day Mile.

Day also received the George Woolf Memorial Jockey Award in 1985, given annually to a North American jockey who demonstrates the highest standards of professional and personal conduct. In 1995, he was voted the Mike Venezia Memorial Award, which honors "extraordinary sportsmanship and citizenship". He received the Big Sport of Turfdom Award for 2005 in acknowledgement of the way he worked with the media to enhance coverage of the sport.

== Religion and retirement ==
Early in his career, he had serious substance abuse problems with both drugs and alcohol, but became a born-again Christian in the early 1980s. He has been involved with the Race Track Chaplaincy of America since his conversion, and has served the racing industry's representative on the board of that organization.

After undergoing hip surgery that forced him to miss the Derby for the first time in 21 years, Day announced his retirement on August 3, 2005. He subsequently devoted himself to the Kentucky Race Track Chaplaincy and helped to establish a chapel at Churchill Downs that services backstretch workers. He hosts an annual Race For Grace during Kentucky Derby week to raise money for the chaplaincy, and also travels across America to talk about how his faith and career intertwine. Sheila, his wife since 1979, runs a charity to help single mothers in the Louisville area.

In 2016, Kentucky Governor Bevin appointed Day to the Kentucky Horse Racing Commission.

== Year-end charts ==
National List for Jockeys Rankings
Year	Earnings	Wins
2000	1	11
2001	3	19
2002	4	14
2003	6	20
2004	11	54

Preceded by Gary Stevens	Jockeys' Guild President; 2000-2001	Succeeded by Tomey Jean Swan
