= Cat Thief =

American-bred Thoroughbred racehorse

- Sire: Storm Cat
- Grandsire: Storm Bird
- Dam: Train Robbery
- Damsire: Alydar
- Sex: Stallion
- Foaled: January 30, 1996 (age 30)
- Country: United States
- Colour: Chestnut
- Breeder: Overbrook Farm
- Owner: Overbrook Farm
- Trainer: D. Wayne Lukas
- Record: 30: 4-9-8
- Earnings: US$3,951,012

Major wins
- Breeders' Futurity (1998); Swaps Stakes (1999); Breeders' Cup wins: Breeders' Cup Classic (1999)

Cat Thief (foaled January 30, 1996, in Kentucky) is an American Thoroughbred racehorse, who won the 1999 Breeders' Cup Classic.

Since the death of 1996 winner Alphabet Soup on January 28, 2022, Cat Thief is the oldest Breeders' Cup Classic winner that is still alive.

== Background ==
Cat Thief was sired by Storm Cat, an outstanding Champion sire and the grandson of both the 20th Century's most important sire, Northern Dancer and whose damsire was the U.S. Triple Crown champion, Secretariat. Cat Thief's dam was the multiple stakes winner, Train Robbery, a daughter of U.S. Racing Hall of Fame inductee Alydar.

== Career ==
=== 1998 ===
Conditioned for racing by Hall of Fame trainer, D. Wayne Lukas, at age two Cat Thief won two of his seven starts including the Lane's End Breeders' Futurity. He was then third behind winner Answer Lively in the Breeders' Cup Juvenile.

=== 1999 ===
As a three-year-old, Cat Thief made thirteen starts. He ran third to winner Charismatic in the 1999 Kentucky Derby and seventh to Charismatic in the Preakness Stakes.

Under jockey Pat Day, Cat Thief went on to win the Swaps Stakes and at Gulfstream Park in Florida Pat Day was aboard him again for the most important win of his career, the Breeders' Cup Classic.

=== 2000 ===
Cat Thief made ten more starts in 2000 but did not earn a win and was retired to stud at his owner's Overbrook Farm for the 2001 season.

=== Results ===
Date	Track	Race	Finished
2 year old
4/22/1998	Keeneland	Maiden Special Weight	6th
7/1/1998	Ellis Park	Maiden Special Weight	2nd
8/1/1998	Saratoga	Maiden Special Weight	1st
8/21/1998	Saratoga	Allowance	2nd
9/11/1998	Belmont Park	Allowance	2nd
10/18/1998	Keeneland	(Lane's End) Breeders' Futurity	1st
11/7/1998	Churchill Downs	Breeders' Cup Juvenile	3rd
3 year old
1/31/1999	Gulfstream Park	Hutcheson Stakes	3rd
2/20/1999	Gulfstream Park	Fountain of Youth Stakes	2nd
3/13/1999	Gulfstream Park	Florida Derby	3rd
4/10/1999	Keeneland	(Toyota) Blue Grass Stakes	2nd
5/1/1999	Churchill Downs	Kentucky Derby	3rd
5/15/1999	Pimlico	Preakness Stakes	7th
5/29/1999	Belmont Park	Metropolitan Handicap	6th
7/18/1999	Hollywood Park	Swaps Stakes	1st
8/8/1999	Monmouth Park	Haskell Invitational Handicap	2nd
8/28/1999	Saratoga	Travers Stakes	7th
9/25/1999	Turfway Park	Kentucky Cup Classic Handicap	3rd
11/6/1999	Gulfstream Park	Breeders' Cup Classic	1st
12/26/1999	Santa Anita	Malibu Stakes	3rd
4 year old
1/15/2000	Santa Anita	San Fernando Breeders' Cup Stakes	2nd
2/6/2000	Santa Anita	San Antonio Handicap	2nd
3/4/2000	Santa Anita	Santa Anita Handicap	6th
4/8/2000	Oaklawn Park	Oaklawn Handicap	3rd
5/13/2000	Pimlico	Pimlico Special	5th
6/17/2000	Churchill Downs	Stephen Foster Handicap	3rd
7/9/2000	Hollywood Park	(Sempra Energy) Hollywood Gold Cup	5th
8/6/2000	Saratoga	Whitney Handicap	2nd
9/16/2000	Turfway Park	Kentucky Cup Classic Handicap	6th
11/4/2000	Churchill Downs	Breeders' Cup Classic	7th

== Pedigree ==
Pedigree of Cat Thief (1996-)
Sire Storm Cat (1983)	Storm Bird	Northern Dancer	Nearctic
Sire Storm Cat (1983)	Storm Bird	Northern Dancer	Natalma
Sire Storm Cat (1983)	Storm Bird	South Ocean	New Providence
Sire Storm Cat (1983)	Storm Bird	South Ocean	Shining Sun
Sire Storm Cat (1983)	Terlingua	Secretariat	Bold Ruler
Sire Storm Cat (1983)	Terlingua	Secretariat	Somethingroyal
Sire Storm Cat (1983)	Terlingua	Crimson Saint	Crimson Satan
Sire Storm Cat (1983)	Terlingua	Crimson Saint	Bolero Rose
Dam Train Robbery (1987)	Alydar	Raise A Native	Native Dancer
Dam Train Robbery (1987)	Alydar	Raise A Native	Raise You
Dam Train Robbery (1987)	Alydar	Sweet Tooth	On-And-On
Dam Train Robbery (1987)	Alydar	Sweet Tooth	Plum Cake
Dam Train Robbery (1987)	Track Robbery	No Robbery	Swaps
Dam Train Robbery (1987)	Track Robbery	No Robbery	Bimette
Dam Train Robbery (1987)	Track Robbery	Left at Home	Run For Nurse
Dam Train Robbery (1987)	Track Robbery	Left at Home	Scoreless
