= 2000 in sports =

2000 in sports describes the year's events in world sport.

== Alpine skiing ==
- Alpine Skiing World Cup
  - Men's overall season champion: Hermann Maier, Austria
  - Women's overall season champion: Renate Götschl, Austria

== American football ==
- Super Bowl XXXIV – the St. Louis Rams (NFC) won 23–16 over the Tennessee Titans (AFC)
  - Location: Georgia Dome
  - Attendance: 72,625
  - MVP: Kurt Warner, QB (St. Louis)
- Marshall Faulk wins the regular-season MVP award.
- Sugar Bowl (1999 season):
  - The Florida State Seminoles won 49-29 over the Virginia Tech Hokies to win the college football national championship

== Association football ==
- Euro 2000 – France won 2-1 in extra time over Italy, with a golden goal by Trézéguet. This was France's second European Championship title.
- Champions' League – Real Madrid won 3-0 in the final against Valencia. This was Real Madrid's 8th European Cup title.
- UEFA Cup 1999–2000 – Galatasaray won 4-1 on penalties, in the final against Arsenal, after a 0-0 draw at the end of the match. This was the first European title won by a Turkish team.
- European Super Cup – Galatasaray beat Real Madrid 2-1 after extra time, with a golden goal by Jardel.
- Intercontinental Cup – Boca Juniors beat Real Madrid 2-1, winning the cup for the second time.
- FIFA Club World Cup – Sport Club Corinthians Paulista won 4-3 on penalties, in the final against Clube de Regatas Vasco da Gama after a 0-0 draw at the end of the match. This was the inaugural FIFA Club World Cup.

== Athletics ==
- September – Athletics at the 2000 Summer Olympics held at Sydney, Australia

== Australian rules football ==
- Australian Football League
  - March 9 – Docklands Stadium opens with Essendon 24.12 (156) beating Port Adelaide 8.14 (62)
  - July 15 – Essendon becomes the first club to win its first nineteen games when it beats Hawthorn 25.15 (165) to 13.4 (82). This beats Collingwood's perfect home-and-away season of eighteen games from 1929.
  - August 5 – Essendon become the first AFL team to win 21 of 22 games in a VFL/AFL home-and-away season, losing only to the Western Bulldogs in its second last game
  - Essendon wins the 104th AFL premiership defeating Melbourne 19.21 (135) to 11.9 (75).
  - Brownlow Medal awarded to Shane Woewodin (Melbourne)

== Baseball ==
- Major League Baseball dissolves the National and American Leagues as separate legal entities, although retaining them as competitive entities. From this point forward, the leagues’ functions are consolidated in the office of the Commissioner of Baseball.
- World Series – New York Yankees win 4 games to 1 over the New York Mets. The Series MVP is Derek Jeter of the Yankees
- Japan Series – The Yomiuri Giants defeat the Fukuoka Daiei Hawks 4 games to 2. The Giants' Hideki Matsui is named Series MVP.

== Basketball ==
- NBA Finals –
  - Los Angeles Lakers win their first NBA title in twelve years, defeating the Indiana Pacers 4 games to 2.
- NCAA Men's Basketball Championship –
  - Michigan State wins 89–76 over Florida
- WNBA Finals –
  - Houston Comets win 2 games to 0 over the New York Liberty to complete their four–peat.
- Euroleague final:
  - Panathinaikos defeats Maccabi Tel Aviv 73–67 for the title.
- National Basketball League (Australia) Finals:
  - Perth Wildcats defeated the Victoria Titans 2–0 in the best–of–three final series.
- European basketball enters a new era with the creation of the Euroleague Basketball (company). This leads to a rift with FIBA Europe and the creation of two separate continent-wide competitions for the 2000–01 season—the SuproLeague, operated by FIBA Europe, and Euroleague Basketball's Euroleague.

== Boxing ==
- May 13 to May 21 – 2000 European Amateur Boxing Championships held in Tampere, Finland
- July 29 – Kostya Tszyu defeats Julio César Chávez by a knockout in six to retain the WBC's world Jr. Welterweight title.
- August 12 – Evander Holyfield defeats John Ruiz by decision in 12 rounds to regain the WBA's world Heavyweight title, becoming the first boxer to win the world Heavyweight title four times.
- The Ring named Félix Trinidad the "Fighter of the Year 2000". Eric Morales won a 12-round points victory over Marco Antonio Barrera, for the unified WBC and WBO 122 Pound Titles, in The Ring's "Fight of The Year 2000".

== Canadian football ==
- Grey Cup – B.C. Lions win 28–26 over the Montreal Alouettes
- Vanier Cup – Ottawa Gee-Gees win 42–39 over the Regina Rams

== Cricket ==
- June 26 – Bangladesh becomes the tenth Test cricket playing nation.

== Cycle racing ==
Road bicycle racing

- Giro d'Italia – Stefano Garzelli
- Tour de France – Lance Armstrong (Rescinded)
- World Road Cycling Championship – Romans Vainšteins

Cyclo-cross

- 2000 UCI Cyclo-cross World Championships
  - Men's Competition won by Richard Groenendaal
  - Women's Competition won by Hanka Kupfernagel

== Dogsled racing ==
- Iditarod Trail Sled Dog Race Champion
  - Doug Swingley wins with lead dogs: Stormy & Cola

== Field hockey ==
- Olympic Games Men's Competition: Netherlands
- Olympic Games Women's Competition: Australia

== Figure skating ==
- World Figure Skating Championships –
  - Men's champion: Alexei Yagudin, Russia
  - Ladies' champion: Michelle Kwan, United States
  - Pairs' champions: Maria Petrova and Alexei Tikhonov, Russia
  - Ice dance champions: Marina Anissina and Gwendal Peizerat, France
- First World Synchronized Skating Championships held in Minneapolis

== Floorball ==
- Men's World Floorball Championships
  - Champion: Sweden

== Gaelic Athletic Association ==
- Camogie
  - All–Ireland Camogie Champion: Tipperary
  - National Camogie League: Cork
- Gaelic football
  - All-Ireland Senior Football Championship – Kerry 0–17 beats Galway 1–10
  - National Football League – Derry 1–8 beats Meath 0–9
  - Sligo Senior Football Championship – Bunninadden were crowned County Champions by defeating Coolera/Strandhill
  - Dublin Senior Football Championship – Na Fianna were crowned County Champions by defeating Kilmacud Crokes
- Ladies' Gaelic football
  - All-Ireland Senior Football Champion: Mayo
  - National Football League: Mayo
- Hurling
  - All-Ireland Senior Hurling Championship – Kilkenny 5–15 died Offaly 1–14
  - National Hurling League – Galway 2–18 beat Tipperary 2–13

== Golf ==
Men's professional

- Masters Tournament – Vijay Singh
- U.S. Open – Tiger Woods wins by 15 shots, a record for all majors, with a U.S. Open to–par record score of –12.
- British Open – Tiger Woods becomes the fifth golfer in history to achieve the modern "career grand slam", and sets the to–par record for all majors (–19).
- PGA Championship – Tiger Woods becomes the first golfer since Ben Hogan in 1953 to win three majors in a calendar year. He ties the to–par record for the PGA (–18) with Bob May, and wins in a playoff.
- PGA Tour money leader – Tiger Woods – $9,188,321
- PGA Tour Player of the Year – Tiger Woods
- PGA Tour Rookie of the Year – Michael Clark II
- Tiger Woods set or tied a total of 27 PGA Tour records during the year
- Senior PGA Tour money leader – Larry Nelson – $2,708,005

Men's amateur

- British Amateur – Mikko Ilonen
- U.S. Amateur – Jeff Quinney
- European Amateur – Carl Pettersson

Women's professional

- Nabisco Championship – Karrie Webb
- LPGA Championship – Juli Inkster
- U.S. Women's Open – Karrie Webb
- Classique du Maurier – Meg Mallon
- LPGA Tour money leader – Karrie Webb – $1,876,853
- The European team defeated the United States team 14 ½ – 11 ½ to regain the Solheim Cup.

== Handball ==
- Men's European Championship: Sweden
- Women's European Championship: Hungary

== Harness racing ==
- March 18 – John Campbell became the first driver in harness racing history to reach $100 million in earnings at one track on at the Meadowlands Racetrack.
- North America Cup – Gallo Blue Chip
- United States Pacing Triple Crown races –
  1. Cane Pace – Powerful Toy
  2. Little Brown Jug – Astreos
  3. Messenger Stakes – Ain't No Stopn Him
- United States Trotting Triple Crown races –
  1. Hambletonian – Yankee Paco
  2. Yonkers Trot – Goalfish
  3. Kentucky Futurity – Credit Winner
- Australian Inter Dominion Harness Racing Championship –
  - Pacers: Shakamaker
  - Trotters: Lyell Creek

== Horse racing ==
Steeplechases

- Cheltenham Gold Cup – Looks Like Trouble
- Grand National – Papillon

Flat races

- Australia – Melbourne Cup won by Brew
- Canada – Queen's Plate won by Scatter the Gold
- Dubai – Dubai World Cup won by Dubai Millennium
- France – Prix de l'Arc de Triomphe won by Sinndar
- Ireland – Irish Derby Stakes won by Sinndar
- Japan – Japan Cup won by T M Opera O
- English Triple Crown Races:
  1. 2,000 Guineas Stakes – King's Best
  2. The Derby – Sinndar
  3. St. Leger Stakes – Millenary
- United States Triple Crown Races:
  1. Kentucky Derby – Fusaichi Pegasus
  2. Preakness Stakes – Red Bullet
  3. Belmont Stakes – Commendable
- Breeders' Cup World Thoroughbred Championships:
  1. Breeders' Cup Classic – Tiznow
  2. Breeders' Cup Distaff – Spain
  3. Breeders' Cup Filly & Mare Turf – Perfect Sting
  4. Breeders' Cup Juvenile – Macho Uno
  5. Breeders' Cup Juvenile Fillies – Caressing
  6. Breeders' Cup Mile – War Chant
  7. Breeders' Cup Sprint – Kona Gold
  8. Breeders' Cup Turf – Kalanisi

== Ice hockey ==
- Art Ross Trophy as the NHL's leading scorer during the regular season: Jaromir Jagr, Pittsburgh Penguins
- Hart Memorial Trophy for the NHL's Most Valuable Player:
  - Chris Pronger, St. Louis Blues
- Stanley Cup –New Jersey Devils win 4 games to 2 over the Dallas Stars
- World Hockey Championship
  - Men's champion: Czech Republic defeated Slovakia
  - Junior Men's champion: Czech Republic defeated Russia
  - Women's champion: Canada defeated the United States

== Lacrosse ==
- Toronto Rock defeats Rochester Knighthawks 14-13 to win the National Lacrosse League championship

== Mixed martial arts ==
The following is a list of major noteworthy MMA events during 2000 in chronological order.

Date	Event	Alternate Name/s	Location	Attendance	PPV Buyrate	Notes
January 30	Pride Grand Prix 2000 Opening Round	—	Tokyo, Japan	48,316	—	Opening Round to Pride GP 2000 openweight tournament. The event featured Royce Gracie in his first fight since April 1995.
March 10	UFC 24: First Defense	—	Lake Charles, Louisiana, United States	—	—	The event was originally scheduled to have a title fight between Kevin Randleman and Pedro Rizzo. However this postponed due to a concussion Randleman suffered before the fight. This event featured, Dan Severn as a referee for the preliminary bouts.
April 14	UFC 25: Ultimate Japan 3	—	Tokyo, Japan	—	—	This event was held to determine the new light heavyweight champion following Frank Shamrock's retirement from the UFC.
May 1	Pride Grand Prix 2000 Finals	—	Tokyo, Japan	38,429	—	Mark Coleman becomes the Pride 2000 openweight Grand Prix champion. The event featured a highly anticipated match between Royce Gracie against Kazushi Sakuraba.
June 4	Pride 9: New Blood	—	Nagoya, Japan	—	—	Matt Serra was to fight on this card, but his opponent, Johil de Oliveira, was injured by a pyrotechnics explosion at the event.
June 9	UFC 26: Ultimate Field Of Dreams	—	Cedar Rapids, Iowa, United States	—	—	This event featured the first UFC "bantamweight" bout as defined as 155lbs.
August 27	Pride 10 – Return of the Warriors	—	Tokorozawa, Saitama, Japan	35,000	—	—
September 22	UFC 27: Ultimate Bad Boyz	—	New Orleans, United States	—	—	UFC veteran Frank Shamrock replaced Jeff Blatnick in the announcers booth for this event.
October 31	Pride 11 – Battle of the Rising Sun	—	Osaka, Japan	13,500	—	—
November 17	UFC 28: High Stakes	—	Atlantic City, New Jersey, United States	—	—	UFC rule change, New Jersey SACB becomes the first state to regulate MMA in the USA. Uses newly written Unified Rules of Mixed Martial Arts. This event held the first and only UFC super heavyweight bout.
December 9	Pride 12 – Cold Fury	—	Saitama, Japan	26,882	—	—
December 16	UFC 29: Defense of the Belts	—	Tokyo, Japan	1,414	—	This was the last UFC event held by SEG. Because in January 2001, SEG sold the UFC to current owners Zuffa LLC.

== Radiosport ==
- The third World Radiosport Team Championship held in Ljubljana, Slovenia. Gold medals won by Jeff Steinman N5TJ and Dan Street K1TO of the United States.
- Tenth Amateur Radio Direction Finding World Championships are held in Nanjing, China, the first time ever to be hosted at a location outside Europe.

== Rugby league ==
- January 22, Wigan, England – 2000 World Club Challenge is won by the Melbourne Storm who defeat St. Helens 44 – 6 at JJB Stadium before 13,394.
- April 21, Sydney, Australia – 2000 ANZAC test match is won by Australia 52–0 against New Zealand at Stadium Australia before 26,023.
- April 29, Murrayfield Stadium – 2000 Challenge Cup tournament culminates in the Bradford Bulls' 24 – 18 win in the final against the Leeds Rhinos.
- June 5, Suncorp Stadium – 2000 State of Origin series is wrapped up by New South Wales in game two of the series against Queensland.
- August 27, Stadium Australia – 2000 NRL season culminates in the Brisbane Broncos' 14-6 win in the grand final against the Sydney Roosters.
- October 14, Old Trafford – Super League V culminates in St. Helens' 29-16 win in the grand final against Wigan Warriors.
- November 20, Crown Flatt – 2000 Emerging Nations Tournament is won by the British Amateur Rugby League Association who defeated Italy 20-14 in the final.
- November 25, Old Trafford – 2000 World Cup tournament culminates in Australia's 40-12 win in the final against New Zealand.

== Rugby union ==
- Italy is admitted to the former Five Nations Championship which now establishes its current Six Nations format
- 106th Six Nations Championship series is won by England
- Tri Nations – Australia

== Snooker ==
- World Snooker Championship – Mark Williams beats Matthew Stevens 18–16
- World rankings – Mark Williams becomes world number one for 2000/01

== Swimming ==
- Fifth World Short Course Championships, held in Athens, Greece (March 16 – March 19)
  - United States wins the most medals (25), and the most gold medals (9)
- 25th European LC Championships, held in Helsinki, Finland (July 3 – August 9)
  - Romania wins the most medals (14), Sweden and Russia the most gold medals (6)
- XXVII Olympic Games, held in Sydney, Australia (September 16 – September 23)
- Fourth European SC Championships, held in Valencia, Spain (December 14 – December 17)
  - Great Britain wins the most medals (19), Sweden the most gold medals (10)
- January 18 – Australia's Susie O'Neill breaks her own world record in the 200 m butterfly (short course) again, this time at a meet in Sydney, Australia, clocking 2:04.16.
- February 12 – In Paris, France, US–swimmer Jenny Thompson betters her own world record in the women's 100 m butterfly (short course), from 56:90 to 56:80.
- March 18 – Jenny Thompson again betters her own world record in the women's 100 m butterfly (short course), this time in Athens, Greece, from 56:80 to 56:56.
- March 23 – Anthony Ervin breaks the world record in the men's 50 m freestyle (short course) at a swimming meet in Minneapolis, clocking 21.21.
- June 16 – At the Russian National Swimming Championships in Moscow, Alexander Popov betters the ten-year-old world record (21.81) in the 50m freestyle (long course), swam by USA's Tom Jager in 1990 – 21.64.

== Tennis ==
- Grand Slam in tennis men's results:
  1. Australian Open – Andre Agassi
  2. French Open – Gustavo Kuerten
  3. Wimbledon championships – Pete Sampras
  4. U.S. Open – Marat Safin
- Grand Slam in tennis women's results:
  1. Australian Open – Lindsay Davenport
  2. French Open – Mary Pierce
  3. Wimbledon championships – Venus Williams
  4. U.S. Open – Venus Williams
- 2000 Summer Olympics
  - Men's Singles Competition – Yevgeny Kafelnikov
  - Women's Singles Competition – Venus Williams
  - Men's Doubles Competition – Sébastien Lareau & Daniel Nestor
  - Women's Doubles Competition – Venus Williams & Serena Williams
- Davis Cup
  - Spain wins 3–1 over Australia in world tennis

== Volleyball ==
- Men's World League: Italy
- Women's World Grand Prix: Cuba
- Olympic Games Men's Competition – Yugoslavia
- Olympic Games Women's Competition – Cuba

== Water polo ==
- Olympic Games men's competition: Hungary
- Olympic Games women's competition: Australia

== Yacht racing ==
- New Zealand retains the America's Cup as Team New Zealand defeats Italian challenger, Luna Rossa, 5 races to 0

== Multi-sport events ==
- 2000 Summer Olympics held at Sydney
  - United States wins the most medals (97) and the most gold medals (40).
- Winter Goodwill Games held at Lake Placid, New York

== Awards ==
- Associated Press Male Athlete of the Year – Tiger Woods, PGA Tour golfer
- Associated Press Female Athlete of the Year – Marion Jones, Track and Field
- ABC's Wide World of Sports Athlete of the Year: Tiger Woods, PGA Tour golfer. Note that the Wide World award was discontinued in 2001.
