= Rule (horse) =

American thoroughbred racehorse

- Sire: Roman Ruler
- Grandsire: Fusaichi Pegasus
- Dam: Rockcide
- Damsire: Personal Flag
- Sex: Stallion
- Foaled: January 13, 2007
- Country: United States
- Colour: Bay
- Breeder: WinStar Farm
- Owner: WinStar Farm
- Trainer: Todd Pletcher
- Record: 20: 6–2–6
- Earnings: $1,162,350

Major wins
- Delta Jackpot Stakes (2009); Jean Lafitte Stakes (2009); Sam F. Davis Stakes (2010); Birdstone Stakes (2011); Monmouth Cup (2012)

Rule (foaled January 13, 2007) is an American thoroughbred racehorse, winner of the 2012 Monmouth Cup Stakes. At his retirement in 2012, he had a record of 6–2–6 from twenty starts.

== Background ==
Rule was sired by Roman Ruler and his dam was Rockcide, a daughter of Personal Flag and Belle's Good Cide.

He was trained by Todd Pletcher for WinStar Farm.

== Career ==
=== 2009: Two-year-old season ===
On July 19, 2009, Rule had his debut start at Belmont Park where he finished third.

Rule's second start was on September 5 at Saratoga Race Course, where he came second.

Rule had his third start and first win at a maiden race on October 8 at Belmont Park. He was the favorite for the race.

His fourth start and second win came on November 6 with the Jean Lafitte Stakes at Delta Downs, where he set a track record for a mile (1:37.45) and earned a career-best Beyer Speed Figure of 97.

His fifth start and third win came on December 4, when he entered the Delta Jackpot Stakes. Delta Downs had faced snowfall that day prior to the race and the track had become "sloppy and laboring". According to jockey John R. Velazquez, Rule found the conditions on the track uncomfortable. Throughout most of the race, Rule was followed closely by Uh Oh Bango, until he created a one-length lead after six furlongs. Rule had posted quarter-mile splits of :23.24, :46.75, and 1:12.12 before the lead, and won the race with a winning time of 1:45.63. He earned a Beyer Speed Figure of 95. On the win, Velazques said:

He had to work today [...] It was a little different than it was when he was here before, quite a bit heavier. Once I got after him, he put in a good fight. It was well done. He wasn't allowing (Uh Oh Bango) to go by. He did just enough.

Following the Delta Jackpot, he was sent to Palm Meadows Thoroughbred Training Center.

=== 2010: Three-year-old season ===
In February 2010, Rule entered and won the Sam F. Davis Stakes.

On March 20, Rule entered the Florida Derby at Gulfstream Park, making it his first start beyond 1 1/16 miles. Pletcher had initially expected to enter Eskendereya alongside Rule in the Derby, but his owner had announced four days prior that he would not be racing. Having won his previous four races, Rule was favorite to win, with only Radiohead having won anything beyond an entry-level competition. Before the race, Pletcher addressed expectations that Rule would lead throughout:

Too much is being made of the fact that he's one dimensional. He's really not [...] We'll continue to allow the horse to run the way he wants to run, and if he's on the lead again, fine. We're not going to take away what's easy for him, and going a mile and one-eighth at Gulfstream Park you've got to establish position going into that first turn.

Despite being favorite, Rule was unsuccessful in winning the race, being beaten by 1 1/4 lengths by Ice Box and Pleasant Prince. Reflecting on the loss, Pletcher later said that "John Velazquez thought he did a little bit too much, too early with him and was closer to the pace than he needed to be and that may have compromised his finish in the Florida Derby".

In 2009, Rule was being considered as a contender for the 2010 Kentucky Derby, with his trainer Pletcher saying "Should he be good enough to be in the Derby field, we have enough graded earnings to be there. It's a great position, and we're happy for it". On April 24, 2010, he was trained alongside four other Derby hopefuls at Churchill Downs, being ridden by Larry Melancon. The weather conditions that day were unfavourable, with Pletcher saying:

He went OK. It wasn’t brilliant, but he’s a horse that’s really done nothing wrong his whole career; he’s pretty much run well every time. I think we may need to adjust his tactics a little bit.

In May, Pletcher decided that Rule would not be entering the race.

=== 2011: Four-year-old season ===
As a four year old, Rule won the 2011 Birdstone Stakes at Saratoga. At the same age, he placed first in the Grade I Donn Handicap and Woodward Stakes races. In October 2011, Rule entered the Hawthorne Gold Cup Handicap (then a Grade II), where he finished in seventh place.

=== 2012: Five-year-old season ===
Rule's next race was not until July 7, 2012, when he entered the Monmouth Cup Stakes (also a Grade II race) in his five-year-old debut. He faced considerable opposition within the race, going against five older horses including 2011 Jockey Club Gold Cup winner Flat Out. Despite this, he remained in the starting position of second until after three quarters, when he took first and won. On the race, jockey Joe Bravo said "I don't care how long the layoff, this horse was ready to go the minute the gates opened. He was doing it very easy, all the way down the backstretch. Todd had him ready to run and I just steered him around the track".

On August 4, Rule entered the Whitney Invitational Handicap and received his worst career finish of ninth place. Pletcher had been optimistic on Rule's chances prior to the race, saying "Rule is sort of an old, wiser horse who does what he has to do in the mornings [...] It's typical for him to not 'wow' you in the morning, but it seems like he's doing well". Immediately prior to the race, he was positive about Rule's starting position of post position 1, saying "We’ll be able to save ground around the first turn. There appears to be plenty of pace in there so hopefully we’ll be able to save ground and work our way into a good position".

Following his appearance at the Whitney Stakes, Rule's third five-year-old start was on September 1 in the Woodward Stakes at Saratoga. Ridden by Ramon Domínguez, he began in post position 1.

On October 19, Rule entered the Frank "Pancho" Martin Stakes at Belmont Park. The race was won by Hymn Book, with Rule coming in third place behind Small Town Talk.

== Retirement and stud career ==
In November 2012, it was announced that Rule would be retiring and standing at stud at Vinery New York near Poughquag, New York. His starting stud fee was $6,500.

Rule has sired a number of horses, including:

- Klaatu (foaled 2014), out of Four Star Morning (a daughter of Press Card).
