= Mr. Prospector =

American-bred Thoroughbred racehorse

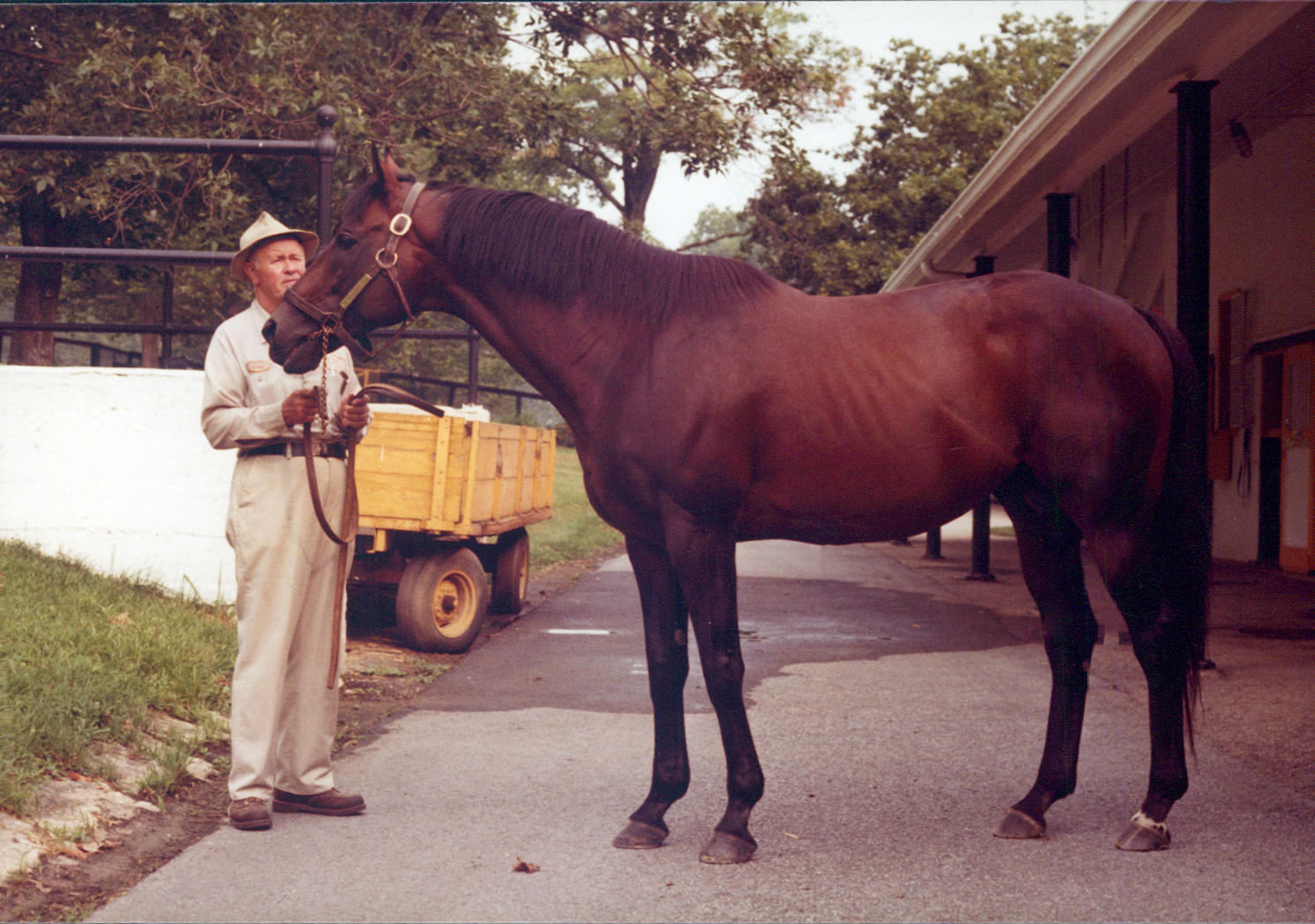
- Mr. Prospector at Claiborne Farm in 1981
- Sire: Raise a Native
- Grandsire: Native Dancer
- Dam: Gold Digger
- Damsire: Nashua
- Sex: Stallion
- Foaled: January 28, 1970
- Died: June 1, 1999 (aged 29); Claiborne Farm; Paris, Kentucky, US
- Country: United States
- Colour: Bay
- Breeder: Leslie Combs II
- Owner: Aisco Stable
- Trainer: Jimmy Croll
- Record: 14: 7–4–2
- Earnings: $112,171

Major wins
- Gravesend Handicap (1974); Whirlaway Handicap (1974)

Awards
- Leading sire in North America (1987, 1988); Leading broodmare sire in North America (1997–2003, 2005–06)

Honours
- Grade III Mr. Prospector Stakes at Gulfstream Park
- Last updated on April 27, 2020

Mr. Prospector (January 28, 1970 – June 1, 1999) was an American Thoroughbred racehorse who became an outstanding breeding stallion and notable sire of sires. A sprinter whose career was cut short by repeated injuries, he won seven of his 14 starts, including the Gravesend Handicap at Aqueduct Racetrack and the Whirlaway Handicap at Garden State Park.

Mr. Prospector began his stallion career in Florida as a regional sire. He proved so successful that he was moved to Kentucky where he became a leading sire and later a leading broodmare sire. His descendants have dominated the United States Triple Crown of Thoroughbred Racing for several decades and his impact on Thoroughbred bloodlines is felt worldwide.

== Background ==
Mr. Prospector was a bay stallion who was bred in Kentucky by Leslie Combs II, the owner of Spendthrift Farm. His sire was Raise a Native, a son of Native Dancer. Raise a Native was brilliantly fast but unsound, going undefeated in four races at age two before injury. Raise a Native became a notable sire but tended to pass on his "heavy-topped" build and other conformation issues associated with unsoundness. By contrast, Mr. Prospector's dam, Gold Digger, was a multiple stakes winning mare known for her toughness and durability. A daughter of Nashua, Gold Digger was from a highly distinguished female family tracing back to champion racemare and "blue hen" Myrtlewood.

Mr. Prospector was the highest-priced horse at the 1971 Keeneland July sale of selected yearlings, selling to A. I. "Butch" Savin for $220,000 (equivalent to $1.75 million in 2025). "Mr. P", as he came to be known, raced for owner Savin under his nom de course, Aisco Stable. The colt was trained by Jimmy Croll, a future Hall of Fame member who went on to train Holy Bull.

At maturity, he reached 16 hands (64 inches, 163 cm) high. He had excellent hindquarters and strong hind legs, but his right forefront was turned-out and his knees were offset, making him vulnerable to injury.

== Racing career ==
Mr. Prospector raced at the same time as Hall of Fame members Secretariat and Forego. Though not of their class, he was the top-ranked sprinter of 1974 on the Daily Racing Form's Free Handicap.

Mr. Prospector did not race at age two, but won his first two starts at age three with "ridiculous ease" before being sidelined by illness. He returned on April 1, 1973, in a six-furlong allowance race at Gulfstream Park, which he won by nine lengths. The time of 1:07 4/5 was a new track record and was only two-fifths of a second off the American record.

He next entered the Calumet Purse on April 17, 1973. In his first start at a distance of more than seven furlongs, he took the early lead but faded in the final quarter-mile to finish third. He next entered the Derby Trial on May 2 as the heavy favorite but finished second after a troubled start. This was his last start at age three.

On February 25, 1974, Mr. Prospector finished third in the Paumonok Handicap at Aqueduct Racetrack as the 1-2 favorite. The crowd reportedly responded to the loss by booing jockey Walter Blum "like rutting moose". He then ran second in the Royal Poinciana on March 6 at Hialeah to Lonetree, who set a track record for seven furlongs.

On April 20, Mr. Prospector won the Whirlaway Handicap at Garden State Racetrack, setting a track record of 1:08 3/5 for six furlongs. He then entered the Carter Handicap at Belmont Park on May 18, where he finished second to eventual Horse of the Year Forego. He then finished fourth at the favorite in a turf race, a surface with which the colt was unfamiliar.

Mr. Prospector returned to the winner's circle in the Gravesend Handicap, held on June 19 at Belmont Park. As the second choice in a field of eight, he settled in second place behind Lonetree, then pulled away to win by five lengths. Mr. Prospector made what would prove his final start on July 4 in the Firecracker Handicap, finishing second. Shortly afterwards, he fractured a sesamoid bone and was retired.

== Stud career ==
Mr. Prospector retired to stud in 1975 at Aisco Farm near Ocala, Florida. As a regional sire with limited support, he exceeded expectations when he became North America's leading freshman sire of 1978. He became an outstanding sire, leading the North American general sire list in 1978 and 1979. From 1,195 named foals, he sired 182 stakes winners (15.1%). In 1980, he was relocated to historic Claiborne Farm in Kentucky. Although primarily known for the success of his offspring on the dirt in North America, he also was a top-ten sire for several years in Europe.

Mr. Prospector sired one winner of each of the Triple Crown races, a feat his grandson, Unbridled, also accomplished. His Triple Crown race winners were 2000 Kentucky Derby winner Fusaichi Pegasus; 1985 Preakness Stakes winner Tank's Prospect; and 1982 Belmont Stakes winner and American Horse of the Year Conquistador Cielo. Mr. Prospector's bloodline has been highly influential in the top echelons of Thoroughbred racing. All eight horses entered into the 2015 Belmont Stakes were descendants, through their sires, of Mr. Prospector. Similarly, all of the horses in the 2018 Kentucky Derby were descendants of Mr. Prospector.

Mr. Prospector's stud fee, even without the guarantee of a live foal, peaked at $460,000 in the early and mid-1980s. By March 1994 he was still commanding fees of $170,000-$180,000 even though the market had suffered a downturn. During breeding season, he was often able to "cover" two mares in one day. Mr. Prospector was jointly owned by a 40-member syndicate.

He was humanely euthanized on the afternoon of June 1, 1999 at Claiborne Farm in Paris, Kentucky, after suffering from peritonitis caused by colic. He was 29 years old at the time of his death. He was buried between Nijinsky and Secretariat.

=== Major winners ===
Mr. Prospector's Grade/Group One winners are shown in the table below. The majority raced in North America on the dirt. However, he also had several significant winners in Europe who established more turf-oriented branches of the sire line.

c = colt, f = filly, g = gelding

Foaled	Name	Sex	Major Wins
1976	It's In The Air	f	Alabama Stakes, Ruffian Handicap, Vanity Handicap
1977	Fappiano	c	Metropolitan Handicap, Forego Handicap
1977	Hello Gorgeous	c	William Hill Futurity
1978	Miswaki	c	Prix de la Salamandre
1979	Conquistador Cielo	c	Belmont Stakes, Metropolitan Handicap
1979	Gold Beauty	f	Test Stakes
1980	Eillo	c	Breeders' Cup Sprint
1981	Procida	c	Prix de la Forêt, Hollywood Derby
1982	Tank's Prospect	c	Preakness Stakes
1983	Mogambo	c	Champagne Stakes
1984	Afleet	c	Jerome Handicap, Canadian Horse of the Year
1984	Chic Shirine	f	Ashland Stakes
1984	Gone West	c	Dwyer Stakes
1984	Gulch	c	Hopeful Stakes, Belmont Futurity, Wood Memorial, Metropolitan Handicap, Breeders' Cup Sprint
1984	Jade Hunter	c	Gulfstream Park Handicap, Donn Handicap
1984	Mining	c	Vosburgh Stakes
1985	Classic Crown	f	Frizette Stakes, Gazelle Handicap
1985	Forty Niner	c	Champagne Stakes
1985	Over All	f	Spinaway Stakes, Matron Stakes
1985	Ravinella	f	1000 Guineas, Cheveley Park Stakes
1985	Seeking The Gold	c	Super Derby, Dwyer Stakes
1986	Fantastic Find	f	Hempstead Handicap
1986	Quena	f	Ballerina Stakes, Maskette Stakes, Ruffian Handicap
1986	Tersa	f	Prix Morny
1987	Jade Robbery	c	Grand Critérium
1987	Machiavellian	c	Prix de la Salamandre, Prix Djebel
1988	Lycius	c	Middle Park Stakes
1988	Rhythm	c	Breeders' Cup Juvenile, Travers Stakes
1988	Scan	c	Jerome Handicap
1989	Preach	f	Frizette Stakes
1989	Prospectors Delite	f	Acorn Stakes, Ashland Stakes
1990	Educated Risk	f	Frizette Stakes, Top Flight Handicap
1990	Kingmambo	c	Poule d'Essai des Poulains, St. James's Palace Stakes, Prix du Moulin de Longchamp
1990	Miner's Mark	c	Jockey Club Gold Cup
1991	Coup de Genie	f	Prix Morny, Prix de la Salamandre
1991	Distant View	c	Sussex Stakes
1992	Macoumba	c	Prix Marcel Boussac
1992	Smart Strike	c	Philip H. Iselin Handicap
1993	Golden Attraction	c	Spinaway Stakes, Frizette Stakes, Matron Stakes
1993	Ta Rib	f	Poule d'Essai des Pouliches
1995	Chester House	c	Arlington Million
1997	Fusaichi Pegasus	c	Kentucky Derby
1997	Scatter the Gold	c	Queen's Plate, Prince of Wales Stakes
1997	Traditionally	c	Oaklawn Handicap
1998	Aldeberan	c	Metropolitan Handicap, Forego Handicap
1998	Dancethruthedawn	f	Woodbine Oaks, Queen's Plate, Go For Wand Handicap

=== Influence on the American Triple Crown ===
Mr. Prospector's male-line descendants have had great success in the American Triple Crown races, primarily through his sons Fappiano, Forty Niner and Smart Strike who themselves became sires of sires.

Mr. Prospector's lineage can be found in every American Triple Crown race winner from 2012 onward, with the last horse not to contain lineage through Mr. Prospector was 2011 Kentucky Derby winner Animal Kingdom. His lineage extends even further back for the Preakness Stakes and Belmont Stakes, as he appears in every pedigree from 2009 onward for those two legs of the triple crown races.

The family tree below lists only the winners descended in the male line.

- Mr. Prospector
  - Fappiano (foaled 1977)
    - Cryptoclearance (1984)
      - Ride the Rails (1991)
        - Candy Ride (1999)
          - Twirling Candy (2007)
            - Rombauer (2018) 2021 Preakness Stakes
          - Gun Runner (2013)
            - Early Voting (2019) 2022 Preakness Stakes
      - Victory Gallop (1995) 1998 Belmont Stakes
    - Quiet American (1986)
      - Real Quiet (1995) 1998 Kentucky Derby and Preakness Stakes
    - Unbridled (1987) 1990 Kentucky Derby
      - Grindstone (1993) 1996 Kentucky Derby
        - Birdstone (2001) 2004 Belmont Stakes
          - Mine That Bird (2006) 2009 Kentucky Derby
          - Summer Bird (2006) 2009 Belmont Stakes
      - Unbridled's Song (1993)
        - Liam's Map (2011)
          - Napoleon Solo (2023) 2026 Preakness Stakes
        - Arrogate (2013)
          - Arcangelo (2020) 2023 Belmont Stakes
          - Seize the Grey (2021) 2024 Preakness Stakes
      - Red Bullet (1997) 2000 Preakness Stakes
      - Empire Maker (2000) 2003 Belmont Stakes
        - Pioneerof the Nile (2006)
          - American Pharoah (2012) 2015 Triple Crown winner (Kentucky Derby and Preakness Stakes and Belmont Stakes)
        - Bodemeister (2009)
          - Always Dreaming (2014) 2017 Kentucky Derby
  - Conquistador Cielo (1979) 1982 Belmont Stakes
  - Tank's Prospect (1982) 1985 Preakness Stakes
  - Woodman (1983)
    - Hansel (1988) 1991 Preakness Stakes and Belmont Stakes
    - Timber Country (1992) 1995 Preakness Stakes
  - Gulch (1984)
    - Thunder Gulch (1992) 1995 Kentucky Derby and Belmont Stakes
      - Point Given (1998) 2001 Preakness Stakes and Belmont Stakes
  - Gone West (1984)
    - Elusive Quality (1993)
      - Smarty Jones (2001) 2004 Kentucky Derby and Preakness Stakes
      - Quality Road (2006)
        - National Treasure (2020) 2023 Preakness Stakes
    - Commendable (1997) 2000 Belmont Stakes
  - Afleet (1984)
    - Northern Afleet (1993)
      - Afleet Alex (2002) 2005 Preakness Stakes and Belmont Stakes
  - Forty Niner (1985)
    - Editor's Note (1993) 1996 Belmont Stakes
    - Distorted Humor (1993)
      - Funny Cide (2000) 2003 Kentucky Derby and Preakness Stakes
      - Flower Alley (2002)
        - I'll Have Another (2009) 2012 Kentucky Derby and Preakness Stakes
      - Drosselmeyer (2007) 2010 Belmont Stakes
      - Maclean's Music (2008)
        - Cloud Computing (2014) 2017 Preakness Stakes
  - Seeking the Gold (1985)
    - Jazil (2003) 2006 Belmont Stakes
  - Machiavellian (1987)
    - Street Cry (1998)
      - Street Sense (2004) 2007 Kentucky Derby
  - Kingmambo (1990)
    - Lemon Drop Kid (1996) 1999 Belmont Stakes
  - Our Emblem (1991)
    - War Emblem (1999) 2002 Kentucky Derby and Preakness Stakes
  - Smart Strike (1992)
    - Curlin (2004) 2007 Preakness Stakes
      - Palace Malice (2010) 2013 Belmont Stakes
      - Keen Ice (2012)
        - Rich Strike (2019) 2022 Kentucky Derby
      - Exaggerator (2013) 2016 Preakness Stakes
      - Good Magic (2015)
        - Mage (2020) 2023 Kentucky Derby
        - Dornoch (2021) 2024 Belmont Stakes
      - Journalism (2022) 2025 Preakness Stakes
      - Golden Tempo (2023) 2026 Kentucky Derby and Belmont Stakes
    - Lookin at Lucky (2007) 2010 Preakness Stakes
      - Country House (Note: Country House was promoted to first place as the result of Maximum Security's interference.) (2016) 2019 Kentucky Derby
  - Fusaichi Pegasus (1997) 2000 Kentucky Derby
    - Roman Ruler (2002)
      - Ruler on Ice (2008) 2011 Belmont Stakes

== Pedigree ==
Pedigree of Mr. Prospector (USA), bay stallion, 1970
Sire Raise a Native (USA) 1961	Native Dancer (USA); 1950	Polynesian	Unbreakable
Sire Raise a Native (USA) 1961	Native Dancer (USA); 1950	Polynesian	Black Polly
Sire Raise a Native (USA) 1961	Native Dancer (USA); 1950	Geisha	Discovery
Sire Raise a Native (USA) 1961	Native Dancer (USA); 1950	Geisha	Miyako
Sire Raise a Native (USA) 1961	Raise You (USA); 1946	Case Ace	Teddy
Sire Raise a Native (USA) 1961	Raise You (USA); 1946	Case Ace	Sweetheart
Sire Raise a Native (USA) 1961	Raise You (USA); 1946	Lady Glory	American Flag
Sire Raise a Native (USA) 1961	Raise You (USA); 1946	Lady Glory	Beloved
Dam Gold Digger (USA) 1962	Nashua (USA); 1952	Nasrullah	Nearco
Dam Gold Digger (USA) 1962	Nashua (USA); 1952	Nasrullah	Mumtaz Begum
Dam Gold Digger (USA) 1962	Nashua (USA); 1952	Segula	Johnstown
Dam Gold Digger (USA) 1962	Nashua (USA); 1952	Segula	Sekhmet
Dam Gold Digger (USA) 1962	Sequence (USA); 1946	Count Fleet	Reigh Count
Dam Gold Digger (USA) 1962	Sequence (USA); 1946	Count Fleet	Quickly
Dam Gold Digger (USA) 1962	Sequence (USA); 1946	Miss Dogwood	Bull Dog
Dam Gold Digger (USA) 1962	Sequence (USA); 1946	Miss Dogwood	Myrtlewood (Family 13-c)

== See also ==
- List of racehorses
