= 2000 Preakness Stakes =

125th running of the Preakness Stakes

125th Preakness Stakes
- The Preakness Stakes
- "The Middle Jewel of the Triple Crown" "The Run for the Black-Eyed Susans"
- Location: Pimlico Race Course, Baltimore, Maryland, United States
- Date: May 20, 2000
- Winning horse: Red Bullet
- Jockey: Jerry Bailey
- Trainer: Joe Orseno
- Conditions: Good
- Surface: Dirt

The 2000 Preakness Stakes was the 125th running of the Preakness Stakes thoroughbred horse race. The race took place on May 20, 2000, and was televised in the United States on the ABC television network. Red Bullet, who was jockeyed by Jerry Bailey, won the race three and three quarter lengths over runner-up Fusaichi Pegasus. Approximate post time was 5:28 p.m. Eastern Time. The race was run over a track listed as good in a final time of 1:56.04. The Maryland Jockey Club reported total attendance of 111,821, this is recorded as second highest on the list of American thoroughbred racing top attended events for North America in 2000.

== Payout ==
The 126th Preakness Stakes Payout Schedule

Program Number	Horse Name	Win	Place	Show
4	Red Bullet	$14.40	$3.20	$2.80
7	Fusaichi Pegasus	-	$2.60	$2.20
3	Impeachment	-	-	$3.60

- $2 Exacta: (4–7) paid $24.00
- $2 Trifecta: (4–7–3) paid $115.80
- $1 Superfecta: (4–7–3–6) paid $235.50

== The full chart ==
Finish Position	Margin (lengths)	Post Position	Horse name	Jockey	Trainer	Owner	Post Time Odds	Purse Earnings
1st	0	4	Red Bullet	Jerry Bailey	Joe Orseno	Stronach Stables	6.20-1	$650,000
2nd	6 3/4	7	Fusaichi Pegasus	Kent Desormeaux	Neil D. Drysdale	Fusao Sekiguchi	0.30-1 favorite	$200,000
3rd	7	3	Impeachment	Craig Perret	Todd A. Pletcher	Dogwood Stable	19.10-1	$100,000
4th	7-1/4	6	Captain Steve	Robby Albarado	Bob Baffert	Michael E. Pegram	11.50-1	$50,000
5th	10 1/2	2	Snuck In	Cash Asmussen	Steve Asmussen	Ackerly Brothers	19.60-1	
6th	11 1/2	1	Hugh Hefner	Victor Espinoza	Martin F. Jones	King Edward Racing	49.70-1	
7th	12	5	High Yield	Pat Day	D. Wayne Lukas	Robert B. & Beverly Lewis	7.30-1	
8th	42	8	Hal's Hope	Roger I. Velez	Harold J. Rose	Rose Family Stables	35.10-1	

- Winning Breeder: Frank Stonach; (KY)
- Final Time: 1:56.04
- Track Condition: Good
- Total Attendance: 111,821

== See also ==
- 2000 Kentucky Derby
- 2000 Belmont Stakes
