= 2000 Kentucky Derby =

Horse race

126th Kentucky Derby
- Kentucky Derby
- Location: Churchill Downs
- Date: May 6, 2000
- Winning horse: Fusaichi Pegasus
- Jockey: Kent Desormeaux
- Trainer: Neil Drysdale
- Owner: Fusao Sekiguchi
- Conditions: Fast
- Surface: Dirt
- Attendance: 153,204

The 2000 Kentucky Derby was the 126th running of the Kentucky Derby. The race took place on May 6, 2000. There were 153,204 in attendance. The winning horse Fusaichi Pegasus, ridden by jockey Kent Desormeaux, was the first betting favorite to win the Derby since Spectacular Bid in 1979. This was the last Kentucky Derby race to be broadcast on ABC, ending a 25-year association with the network; NBC took over the broadcast rights the next year and has broadcast the race since then.

The purse was split between the top five finishers. The first-place winner received around $1.86 million which is more than 60% of the total purse.

== Background ==
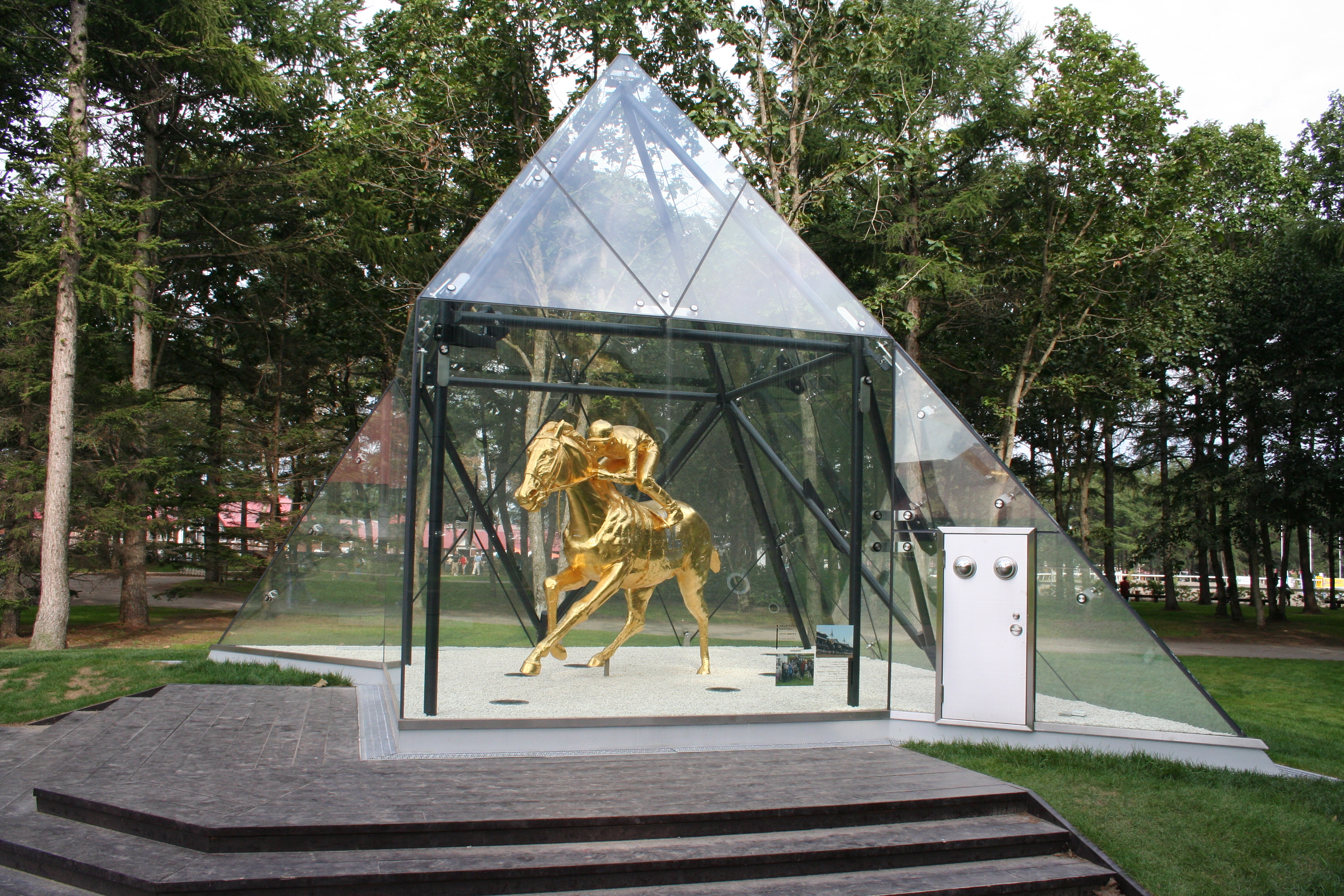
Statue of Fusaichi Pegasus

Fusaichi Pegasus was known as “the most expensive racehorse of all time.” Fusaichi Pegasus was born to mare Angel Fever, who was purchased from Bob McNair and Arthur Hancock’s Stone Farm for $525,000. Fusaichi Pegasus was sold at the 1998 Keeneland July yearling sale to a Japanese businessman, Fusao Sekiguchi, who purchased the yearling at $4 million--the most expensive sale in 13 years. Fusaichi Pegasus was named after the last four letters, “ichi” which means “best” and “Pegasus'', which refers to the winged mythical creature. After Fusaichi Pegasus' winning debut at the Kentucky Derby on May 6, 2000, Fusaichi was sold by Sekiguchi for a record of $70 million. This record-selling horse went to Coolmore Stud in Ireland, and he's held the title of "the most expensive horse in history" all the way through to his retirement of stud duties at Coolmore Stud in Kentucky during 2020.

== Payout ==
The 126th Kentucky Derby Payout Schedule

Finishing Place	Program Number	Horse Name	Odds	Win	Place	Show
1.	12	Fusaichi Pegasus	2-1	$6.60	$5.60	$4.00
2.	5	Aptitude	11-1	-	$9.80	$5.80
3.	1c	Impeachment	6-1	-	-	$4.00

- $2 Exacta: (12-5) Paid $66.00
- $2 Trifecta: (12-5-1c) Paid $435.00
- $1 Superfecta: (12-5-1c-9) Paid $1,635.40

== Full results ==
Finished	Post	Horse	Jockey	Trainer	Owner	Time / behind
1st	15	Fusaichi Pegasus	Kent Desormeaux	Neil Drysdale	Fusao Sekiguchi	2:01.12
2nd	2	Aptitude	Alex Solis	Robert Frankel	Juddmonte Farms	
3rd	14	Impeachment	Craig Perret	Todd Pletcher	Dogwood Stable	
4th	9	More Than Ready	John Velazquez	Todd Pletcher	James T. Scatuorchio	
5th	3	Wheelaway	Richard Migliore	John C. Kimmel	Caesar P. Kimmel & Philip J. Solondz	
6th	11	China Visit	Frankie Dettori	Saeed bin Suroor	Godolphin Racing	
7th	18	Curule	Marlon St. Julien	Saeed bin Suroor	Godolphin Racing	
8th	7	Captain Steve	Robby Albarado	Bob Baffert	Michael E. Pegram	
9th	8	War Chant	Jerry Bailey	Neil Drysdale	Marjorie & Irving Cowan	
10th	6	Deputy Warlock	Mark Guidry	Ken McPeek	Select Stable, Inc.	
11th	5	Trippi	Jorge Chavez	Todd Pletcher	Dogwood Stable	
12th	16	Exchange Rate	Calvin Borel	D. Wayne Lukas	Padua Stables	
13th	1	Anees	Corey Nakatani	Alex Hassinger	The Thoroughbred Corporation	
14th	10	The Deputy	Chris McCarron	Jenine Sahadi	Team Valor & Gary Barber	
15th	17	High Yield	Pat Day	D. Wayne Lukas	Robert B. & Beverly J. Lewis, Mrs. John Magnier & Michael Tabor, et al.	
16th	4	Hal's Hope	Roger Velez	Harold Rose	Rose Family Stables Ltd.	
17th	12	Commendable	Edgar Prado	D. Wayne Lukas	Robert B. & Beverly J. Lewis	
18th	19	Ronton	Brice Blanc	Vladimir Cerin	Jaltipan, LLC.	
19th	13	Graeme Hall	Shane Sellers	Todd Pletcher	Eugene & Laura Melnyk	

== Race description ==
Fusaichi Pegasus broke to the inside left of the field at the start of the race, saving ground along the backstretch. Trippi takes the early lead, with Hal's Hope challenging early on. Aptitude won along the backstretch, easing outside Fusaichi Pegasus nearing the final sixteenth. When rounding the clubhouse turn, Hal's Hope is in the front, following Trippi on the outside in second place. At the 1/2 mile mark, Fusaichi Pegasus finds room in the back towards the inside, having a lot of ground to make up, being eight links from the front. On the far turn, Hal's Hope is continuing to lead the way on the inside. By the 3/4 mile mark, Hal's Hope and Trippi are neck and neck of one another. We then see in the middle of the track that Captain Steve and Wheelaway have made advancing movements, and can see Fusaichi Pegasus in fifth place. Wheelaway takes lead by a head, with More Than Ready following in line. Fusaichi Pegasus comes flying on the outside, passing and taking the lead. Fusaichi Pegasus wins the Kentucky Derby by a leg and a half, with Aptitude following just behind.

== See also ==
- 2000 Preakness Stakes
- 2000 Belmont Stakes
