= Ruler on Ice =

American-bred Thoroughbred racehorse

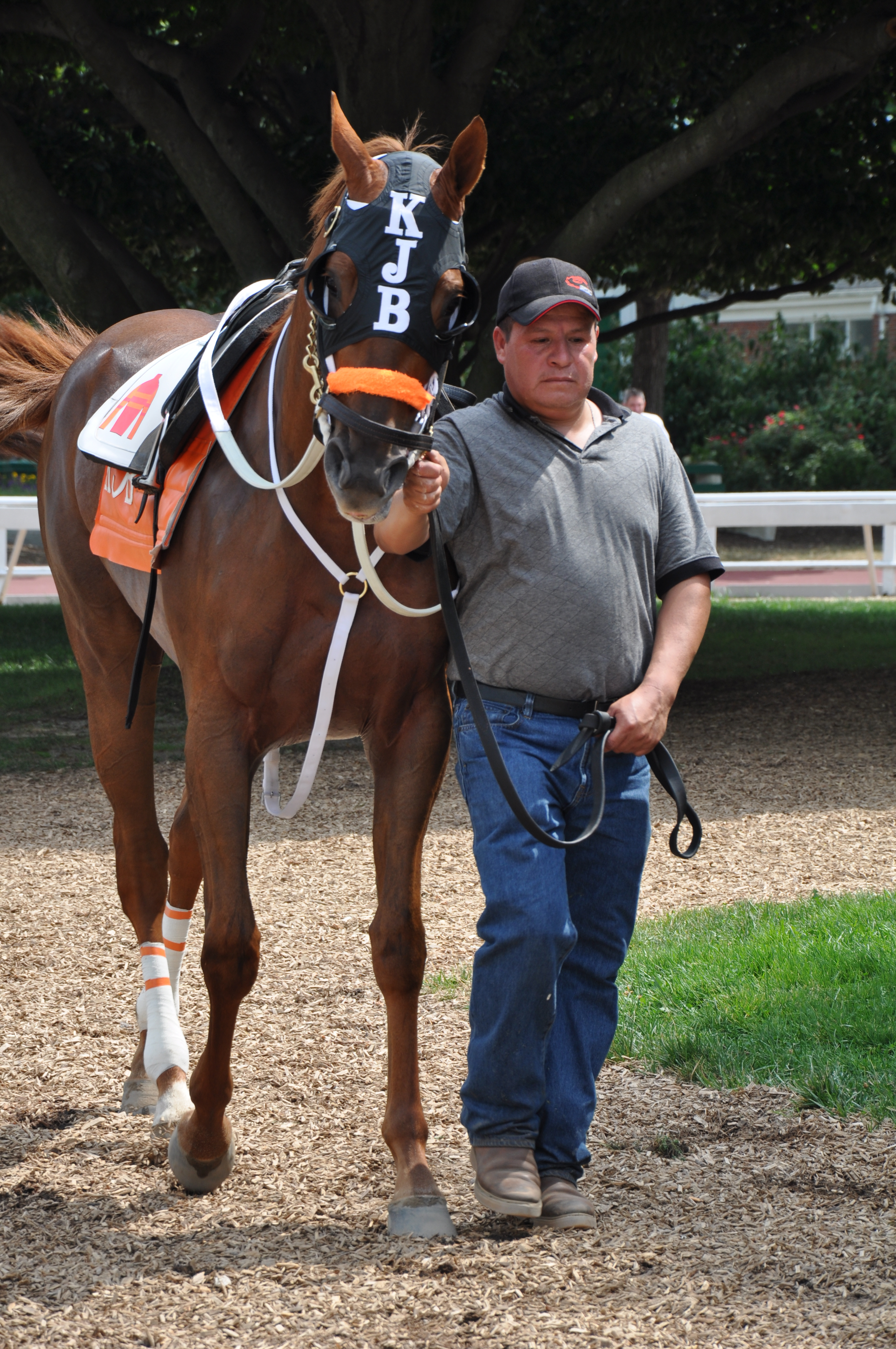
- Ruler on Ice in July 2011
- Sire: Roman Ruler
- Grandsire: Fusaichi Pegasus
- Dam: Champagne Glow
- Damsire: Saratoga Six
- Sex: Gelding
- Foaled: April 2, 2008
- Country: United States
- Colour: Chestnut
- Breeder: Liberation Farm and Brandywine Farm
- Owner: George and Lori Hall
- Trainer: Kelly J. Breen
- Record: 23:4–5–3
- Earnings: US$ 1,709,566

Major wins
- Belmont Stakes (2011)
- Last updated on May 20, 2013

Ruler on Ice (foaled April 2, 2008) is a Thoroughbred racehorse that won the 2011 Belmont Stakes. He was bred and foaled in Kentucky by Brandywine Farm in partnership with Liberation Farm on. He is a chestnut gelding sired by Hill 'n' Dale Farms' Roman Ruler out of the Saratoga Six-bred mare, Champagne Glow. The colt was consigned as lot 988 at the 2009 Keeneland September yearling auction, where he was purchased by George and Lori Hall for $100,000. He won one minor race after the Belmont and was retired from racing in July 2014.

== Racing career ==
Ruler on Ice raced thirteen times on ten different tracks, and of his three wins, two were over sloppy tracks. His trainer for all of his starts was Kelly J. Breen, who was based out of Monmouth Park.

=== 2010: two-year-old season ===
Racing as a two-year-old, Ruler on Ice made his first start in a maiden race at Monmouth Park on September 19, 2010. He finished fifth in a field of seven and was ridden by jockey Joe Bravo. In his next start, a six-furlong maiden race at Delaware Park on October 4, 2010, he won by a head over four other horses and collected $22,800.

=== 2011: three-year-old season ===
Racing as a three-year-old, Ruler on Ice was second in an optional claiming race and won an allowance race on February 22, 2011. On May 7, he was a fast-closing second in the Federico Tesio Stakes at Pimlico, beaten by Concealed Identity. On March 27, 2011, he finished third in the Grade III Sunland Derby to Twice the Appeal and Astrology.

==== Triple Crown races ====
Ruler on Ice went into the Belmont Stakes, the third leg of the US Triple Crown, on June 11, 2011, without running in the Kentucky Derby or the Preakness Stakes. He was a 24–1 longshot to the favorites, Animal Kingdom and Irish colt Master of Hounds, and was wearing blinkers for the first time. The colt won the 2011 Belmont Stakes in the slop, beating Animal Kingdom (winner of the 2011 Kentucky Derby) and Shackleford (winner of the 2011 Preakness Stakes), who finished sixth and fifth, respectively. With this victory, Ruler on Ice became one of the few geldings to ever win the Belmont.

==== Remainder of the season ====
On July 31, 2011, Ruler on Ice finished third in the Haskell Invitational to Coil and Shackleford by two and a half lengths. He ran with his stablemate, Pants On Fire, in a duo dubbed "Fire and Ice" by the press. Pants On Fire finished out of the money in fifth place. On August 27, 2011, Ruler on Ice came in fourth in the 2011 Travers Stakes. On September 24, 2011, he finished second to To Honor and Serve in the 2011 Pennsylvania Derby. He was third in the 2011 Breeders' Cup Classic behind Game on Dude and the 2010 Belmont Stakes winner, Drosselmeyer.

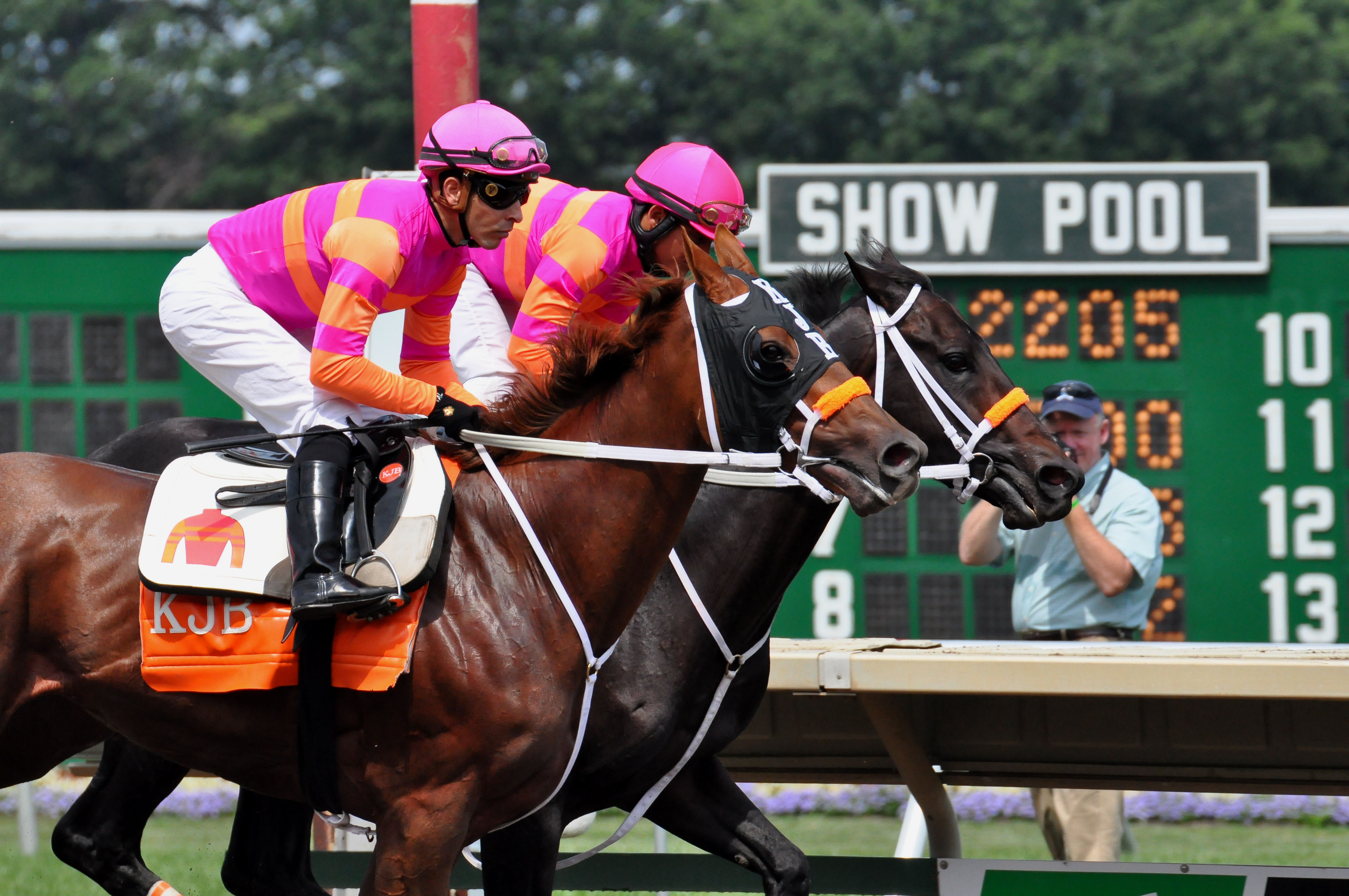
Ruler on Ice (left) and stablemate Pants on Fire at Monmouth Park in 2011. The duo were dubbed "Fire and Ice" during the 2011 racing season

=== 2012: four-year-old season ===
Ruler on Ice finished eighth out of eleven horses in the Donn Handicap run at Gulfstream Park on February 11. Five months later on July 25 at Saratoga, he finished seventh in an allowance race and was second to Win Willy in a similar race at Delaware Park in August. Entered in the Jockey Club Gold Cup, his only graded race of the year, he challenged the front runners until a half-mile into the race when his gait became more choppy and jockey Alan Garcia eased him out of the race.

=== 2013: five-year-old season ===
Ruler on Ice grazing in a paddock at Old Friends Equine

On January 30, Ruler on Ice won an optional claiming race at Aqueduct Racetrack, his first victory since the Belmont. He was fifth out of seven starters in the Grade 3 Excelsior Handicap at Aqueduct Racetrack in March. He then finished fourth in an allowance race at Parx Casino and Racing in April.

Ruler on Ice was retired from racing in July 2014 and lived at the farm of his owners in Versailles, Kentucky until December 2022, when he was pensioned to Old Friends equine retirement facility.

== Pedigree ==
Ruler on Ice's sire, Roman Ruler (2002 – 2017), was the winner of the 2004 Norfolk Stakes and Best Pal Stakes and won the Haskell Invitational Handicap as a three-year-old, accumulating $1,220,800 in his racing career. Roman Ruler was sired by 2000 Kentucky Derby winner Fusaichi Pegasus out of the unraced mare Silvery Swan by Silver Deputy. Silvery Swan also produced 2000 Cigar Mile Handicap and multiple Del Mar Mile Handicap winner El Corredor. Roman Ruler was the leading second-crop sire by cumulative earnings in 2010 and sired Champagne Stakes winner Homeboykris in his first season at stud.

His dam, Champagne Glow (1988 – 2019), was second in the 1990 Frizette Stakes and won the Schuylkill Stakes. Ruler on Ice was her thirteenth foal. She also produced the fillies Lost on Champagne and Champagne d'Oro (winner of the 2010 Grade I Acorn Stakes and Grade I Test Stakes), who both finished third in the Cinderella Stakes. Champagne Glow was sired by Saratoga Six, who was undefeated as a two-year-old and was the 1984 Del Mar Futurity winner. He also sired the Grade I winner Toga Toga Toga and Saratoga Gambler before dying in a 2006 barn fire at the JEH Stallion Station in Hondo, New Mexico, that also claimed the life of 1997 Horse of the Year Favorite Trick. Champagne Glow's dam, Champagne Ginny, was a winner of eight races and won the Boiling Springs Handicap. She produced five foals, four of which were winners. Champagne Glow was euthanized in October 2019 at 31-years-old.

Pedigree of Ruler on Ice (Chestnut, 2008)
Sire Roman Ruler Bay, 2002	Fusaichi Pegasus; Bay, 1997	Mr. Prospector	Raise A Native
Sire Roman Ruler Bay, 2002	Fusaichi Pegasus; Bay, 1997	Mr. Prospector	Gold Digger
Sire Roman Ruler Bay, 2002	Fusaichi Pegasus; Bay, 1997	Angel Fever	Danzig
Sire Roman Ruler Bay, 2002	Fusaichi Pegasus; Bay, 1997	Angel Fever	Rowdy Angel
Sire Roman Ruler Bay, 2002	Silvery Swan; Dark bay, 1994	Silver Deputy	Deputy Minister
Sire Roman Ruler Bay, 2002	Silvery Swan; Dark bay, 1994	Silver Deputy	Silver Valley
Sire Roman Ruler Bay, 2002	Silvery Swan; Dark bay, 1994	Sociable Duck	Quack
Sire Roman Ruler Bay, 2002	Silvery Swan; Dark bay, 1994	Sociable Duck	Unsociable
Dam Champagne Glow Chestnut, 1988	Saratoga Six; Bay, 1982	Alydar	Raise A Native
Dam Champagne Glow Chestnut, 1988	Saratoga Six; Bay, 1982	Alydar	Sweet Tooth
Dam Champagne Glow Chestnut, 1988	Saratoga Six; Bay, 1982	Priceless Fame	Irish Castle
Dam Champagne Glow Chestnut, 1988	Saratoga Six; Bay, 1982	Priceless Fame	Comely Nell
Dam Champagne Glow Chestnut, 1988	Champagne Ginny; Bay, 1977	L'Enjoleur	Buckpasser
Dam Champagne Glow Chestnut, 1988	Champagne Ginny; Bay, 1977	L'Enjoleur	Fanfreluche
Dam Champagne Glow Chestnut, 1988	Champagne Ginny; Bay, 1977	Seminole Girl	Chieftain
Dam Champagne Glow Chestnut, 1988	Champagne Ginny; Bay, 1977	Seminole Girl	Unified

== Racing statistics ==
Date	Age	Distance	Race	Grade	Track	Surface	Odds	Time	Field	Finish	Margin	Jockey	Trainer	Owner	Citation
Sept 19, 2010	2	5 1/2 furlongs (11/16 mile or1,100 m)	Maiden Special Weight	Maiden	Monmouth Park	Dirt	1.60	N/A	7	5	None	Joe Bravo	Kelly Breen	George and Lori Hall
Oct 04, 2010	2	6 furlongs (3/4 mile or1,200 m)	Maiden Special Weight	Maiden	Delaware Park	Dirt	2.30	1:12.19	5	1	Head	Joe Bravo	Kelly Breen	George and Lori Hall
Feb 04, 2011	3	8.3 furlongs (1 mile and 70 yards or 1,673 m)	Allowance Optional Claiming	None	Aqueduct Racetrack	Dirt	2.50	1:43.02	5	2	3/4 length	Jose Valdivia, Jr.	Kelly Breen	George and Lori Hall
Feb 22, 2011	3	8 1/2 furlongs (1 1/16 mile or 1,710 m)	Allowance	None	Parx Racing	Dirt	0.80	1:45.28	7	1	3/4 length	Jose Valdivia, Jr.	Kelly Breen	George and Lori Hall
Mar 27, 2011	3	9 furlongs (1 1/8 mile or 1,810 m)	Sunland Derby	3	Sunland Park	Dirt	6.50	1:50.91	11	3	1 1/2 lengths	Jose Valdivia, Jr.	Kelly Breen	George and Lori Hall
May 07, 2011	3	8 1/2 furlongs (1 1/16 mile or 1,710 m)	Federico Tesio Stakes	None	Pimlico Race Course	Dirt	1.50	1:45.67	7	2	2 lengths	Jose Valdivia, Jr.	Kelly Breen	George and Lori Hall
June 11, 2011	3	12 furlongs (1 1/2 mile or 2,414 m)	Belmont Stakes	1	Belmont Park	Dirt	24.75	2:30.88	12	1	3/4 length	Jose Valdivia, Jr.	Kelly Breen	George and Lori Hall
July 31, 2011	3	9 furlongs (1 1/8 miles or1,800 m)	Haskell Invitational	1	Monmouth Park	Dirt	6.90	1:48.20	8	3	2 1/2 lengths	Jose Valdivia, Jr.	Kelly Breen	George and Lori Hall
August 27, 2011	3	10 furlongs (1 1/4 miles or2,000 m)	Travers Stakes	1	Saratoga Race Course	Dirt	7.30	None	10	4	N/A	Jose Valdivia, Jr.	Kelly Breen	George and Lori Hall
Sept 24, 2011	3	9 furlongs (1 1/8 miles or1,800 m)	Pennsylvania Derby	2	Parx Racing	Dirt	4.80	1:47.34	9	2	2 1/4 lengths	Garrett Gomez	Kelly Breen	George and Lori Hall
Nov 5, 2011	3	10 furlongs (1 1/4 miles or2,000 m)	Breeders' Cup Classic	1	Churchill Downs	Dirt	17.20	2:04.27	12	3	3 Lengths	Garrett Gomez	Kelly Breen	George and Lori Hall
Feb 11, 2012	4	9 furlongs (1 1/8 miles or1,800 m)	Donn Handicap	1	Gulfstream Park	Dirt	9.90	N/A	11	8	N/A	Rosie Napravnik	Kelly Breen	George and Lori Hall
July 25, 2012	4	9 furlongs (1 1/8 miles or1,800 m)	Allowance Optional Claiming	None	Saratoga	Dirt	2.50	N/A	7	7	N/A	Javier Castellano	Kelly Breen	George and Lori Hall
Aug 25, 2012	4	8 furlongs (1 mile or1,600 m) and 70 yards	Allowance Optional Claiming	None	Delaware Park	Dirt	2.00	1:40.45	6	2	2 lengths	Alex Cintron	Kelly Breen	George and Lori Hall
Sept 29, 2012	4	10 furlongs (1 1/4 miles or2,000 m)	Jockey Club Gold Cup	1	Belmont	Dirt	35.00	N/A	10	Did not finish	N/A	Alan Garcia	Kelly Breen	George and Lori Hall
Jan 30, 2013	5	8 furlongs (1 mile or1,600 m)	Allowance Optional Claiming	None	Aqueduct	Dirt	1.25	1:36.97	4	1	3/4 lengths	Irad Ortiz, Jr.	Kelly Breen	George and Lori Hall
Mar 23, 2013	5	9 furlongs (1 1/8 miles or1,800 m)	Excelsior Handicap	3	Aqueduct	Dirt	2.60	N/A	7	5	N/A	Irad Ortiz, Jr.	Kelly Breen	George and Lori Hall
Apr 16, 2013	5	8 furlongs (1 mile or1,600 m)	Allowance	None	Parx	Dirt	2.10	N/A	6	4	N/A	Stewart Elliott	Kelly Breen	George and Lori Hall
