= 2000 Cheltenham Gold Cup =

The 2000 Cheltenham Gold Cup was a horse race which took place at Cheltenham on Thursday 16 March 2000. It was the 73rd running of the Cheltenham Gold Cup, and it was won by Looks Like Trouble. The winner was ridden by Richard Johnson and trained by Noel Chance. The pre-race favourite See More Business finished fourth.

It was the second victory in the Gold Cup for Noel Chance, who had won the race three years earlier with Mr Mulligan. The winning time of 6m 30.3s set a new record – the previous best was 6m 30.9s in 1990.

This was the last Gold Cup to be held before the 2001 foot-and-mouth disease crisis.

== Race details ==
- Sponsor: Tote
- Winner's prize money: £162,400.00
- Going: Good to Firm
- Number of runners: 12
- Winner's time: 6m 30.3s (new record)

== Full result ==
	*	Horse	Age	Jockey	Trainer ^{†}	SP
1		Looks Like Trouble	8	Richard Johnson	Noel Chance	9/2
2	5	Florida Pearl	8	Paul Carberry	Willie Mullins (IRE)	9/2
3	nk	Strong Promise	9	Robert Thornton	Chris Kinane	20/1
4	¾	See More Business	10	Mick Fitzgerald	Paul Nicholls	9/4 fav
5	nk	Lake Kariba	9	Norman Williamson	Venetia Williams	150/1
6	dist	Dorans Pride	11	Paul Hourigan	Michael Hourigan (IRE)	40/1
Fell	Fence 21	Gloria Victis	6	Tony McCoy	Martin Pipe	13/2
UR	Fence 20	Rince Ri	7	Ruby Walsh	Ted Walsh (IRE)	33/1
PU	Fence 20	The Last Fling	10	Seamus Durack	Sue Smith	16/1
PU	Fence 19	Ever Blessed	8	Timmy Murphy	Mark Pitman	14/1
PU	Fence 19	Go Ballistic	11	Tony Dobbin	Alan King	16/1
UR	Fence 13	Tullymurry Toff	9	Graham Lee	Malcolm Jefferson	100/1

* The distances between the horses are shown in lengths or shorter. nk = neck; PU = pulled-up; UR = unseated rider.
† Trainers are based in Great Britain unless indicated.

== Winner's details ==
Further details of the winner, Looks Like Trouble:

- Foaled: 7 May 1992 in Ireland
- Sire: Zaffaran; Dam: Lavengaddy (Balgaddy)
- Owner: Tim Collins
- Breeder: Stephen Reel
