= Homeboykris =

American-bred Thoroughbred racehorse

- Sire: Roman Ruler
- Grandsire: Fusaichi Pegasus
- Dam: One Last Salute
- Damsire: Salutely
- Sex: Gelding
- Foaled: February 13, 2007; Maryland
- Died: May 21, 2016 (aged 9); Pimlico Race Course; Baltimore, Maryland
- Country: United States
- Colour: Bay
- Breeder: Dark Hollow Farm and William Paca Beatson
- Owner: Lazzinnaro, Louis and Bulger, et al
- Trainer: 1) Richard E. Dutrow Jr. 2) Ronald Moquett; 3) Francis P. Campitelli
- Earnings: US$1,385,143

Major wins
- Champagne Stakes (2009)

Homeboykris (foaled February 13, 2007, died May 21, 2016) was a racehorse bred in Maryland in the United States. A son of Roman Ruler, he was purchased privately by a group headed by restaurateur Louis Lazzinnaro that included Major League Baseball executive and manager Joe Torre and turned over to Richard Dutrow Jr., for training. Lazzinnaro purchased Homeboykris from Brenda Tabraue after he broke his maiden at Calder Race Course. Dutrow is known for conditioning the Dual Classic winner Big Brown.

Homeboykris was one of three winners from as many starters out of stakes-place winner One Last Salute, by Salutely. His sire was Roman Ruler, a son of Mr. Prospector. Homeboykris' most important win was the 2009 Grade I Champagne Stakes, which he won by 1 1/2 lengths over Discreetly Mine.

Homeboykris died May 21, 2016, while returning to his barn after winning the first race of the day during the 2016 Preakness Stakes card. According to ESPN, the cause of death may have been cardiovascular complications. It was his 14th win in 63 career starts.

Homeboykris was the first of two horses that died at Pimlico Race Course that day. The second horse, four year-old filly Pramedya, fractured her front left leg in the final turn of the fourth race. She was euthanized on the track. Pramedya's owners also owned 2006 Kentucky Derby winner Barbaro.
