= 2000 Sligo Senior Football Championship =

Gaelic football competition

Tournament details
- County: Sligo
- Year: 2000

Winners
- Champions: Bunninadden (2nd win)
- Manager: James Kearins
- Captain: Fergal O'Flaherty

Promotion/Relegation
- Promoted team(s): St John's, Shamrock Gaels
- Relegated team(s): Geevagh, Cloonacool

This is a round-up of the 2000 Sligo Senior Football Championship. This Championship, after a number of years of being dominated by Eastern Harps and Tourlestrane, provided a novel final pairing, as Bunninadden (last champions in 1891) and Coolera/Strandhiill (last champions in 1907) contested the final, Coolera having dispatched both of the previous champions en route. The destination of the title went down to the last minute, as a dramatic injury-time goal gave Bunninadden their first title for 109 years, leaving Coolera devastated, after leading for much of the game.

James Kearins was the winning manager and was later appointed manager of the Sligo county team in 2003.

== Group stages ==
The Championship was contested by 12 teams, divided into four groups. The top two sides in each group advanced to the quarter-finals.

=== Group A ===
Date	Venue	Team A	Score	Team B	Score
22 July	Coola	Eastern Harps	1-13	Tubbercurry	1-10
29 July	Kent Park	Drumcliffe/Rosses Point	0-13	Tubbercurry	0-7
5 August	Markievicz Park	Eastern Harps	2-15	Drumcliffe/Rosses Point	1-8

Team	Pld	W	D	L	For	Against	Pts
Eastern Harps	2	2	0	0	3-28	2-18	4
Drumcliffe/Rosses Point	2	1	0	1	1-21	2-22	2
Tubbercurry	2	0	0	2	1-17	1-26	0

=== Group B ===
Date	Venue	Team A	Score	Team B	Score
23 July	Tubbercurry	Geevagh	1-7	Cloonacool	0-3
29 July	Easkey	St. Mary's	4-16	Cloonacool	0-4
5 August	Tubbercurry	St. Mary's	0-15	Geevagh	1-6

Team	Pld	W	D	L	For	Against	Pts
St. Mary's	2	2	0	0	4-31	1-10	4
Geevagh	2	1	0	1	2-13	0-18	2
Cloonacool	2	0	0	2	0-7	5-23	0

=== Group C ===
Date	Venue	Team A	Score	Team B	Score
23 July	Tubbercurry	Bunninadden	3-8	Castleconnor	1-4
30 July	Markievicz Park	Coolera/Strandhill	0-9	Bunninadden	0-6
5 August	Easkey	Coolera/Strandhill	0-18	Castleconnor	1-8

Team	Pld	W	D	L	For	Against	Pts
Coolera/Strandhill	2	2	0	0	0-27	1-14	4
Bunninadden	2	1	0	1	3-14	1-13	2
Castleconnor	2	0	0	2	2-12	3-26	0

=== Group D ===
Date	Venue	Team A	Score	Team B	Score
23 July	Enniscrone	Easkey	2-6	Tourlestrane	0-9
30 July	Tubbercurry	Tourlestrane	0-16	Curry	2-8
5 August	Tubbercurry	Easkey	2-7	Curry	0-11

Team	Pld	W	D	L	For	Against	Pts
Easkey	2	2	0	0	4-13	0-20	4
Tourlestrane	2	1	0	1	0-25	4-14	2
Curry	2	0	0	2	2-19	2-23	0

== Quarterfinals ==
Game	Date	Venue	Team A	Score	Team B	Score
Sligo SFC; Quarter Final	18 August	Coola	Eastern Harps	4-18	Geevagh	1-3
Sligo SFC; Quarter Final	19 August	Tubbercurry	Bunninadden	1-11	Easkey	0-8
Sligo SFC; Quarter Final	20 August	Easkey	Coolera/Strandhill	3-11	Tourlestrane	0-9
Sligo SFC; Quarter Final	20 August	Markievicz Park	St. Mary's	0-13	Drumcliffe/Rosses Point	0-13
Sligo SFC; Quarter Final Replay	26 August	Markievicz Park	St. Mary's	2-13	Drumcliffe/Rosses Point	0-6

== Semifinals ==
Game	Date	Venue	Team A	Score	Team B	Score
Sligo SFC; Semi-Final	3 September	Markievicz Park	Bunninadden	1-11	St. Mary's	1-10
Sligo SFC; Semi-Final	3 September	Markievicz Park	Coolera/Strandhill	1-8	Eastern Harps	1-8
Sligo SFC; Semi-Final Replay	10 September	Markievicz Park	Coolera/Strandhill	0-6	Eastern Harps	0-4

== Last eight ==
Quarterfinals; 19 August/August 20
Bunninadden	1-11
Easkey	0-8
St. Mary's	0-13, 2-13 (R)
Drumcliffe/Rosses Point	0-13, 0-6 (R)
Coolera/Strandhill	3-11
Tourlestrane	0-9
Eastern Harps	4-18
Geevagh	1-3

Semifinals; 3 September/September 10
Bunninadden	1-11
St. Mary's	1-10
Coolera/Strandhill	1-8, 0-6 (R)
Eastern Harps	1-8, 0-4 (R)

Final; 1 October
Bunninadden	2-7
Coolera/Strandhill	0-11

== Sligo Senior Football Championship Final ==
Bunninadden	2-7 - 0-11 (final score after 60 minutes)	Coolera/Strandhill
Manager:James Kearins Team: M. Finn; S. Roddy; F. O'Dowd; S. Gormley; J. O'Flaherty; K. Brett; W. Gormley; P. Doohan (1-2); M. Gormley; D. Gormley (1-0); L. Óg Gormley; P. Kerins; A. Killoran (0-3); F. O'Flaherty (Capt)(0-1); E. Gilhooley Substitutes: D. Killoran (0-1); J. Scanlon; K. Kerins; B. Gilhooley	Half-time: 0-6 - 0-7 Competition: Sligo Senior Football Championship (Final) Date: Sunday, 1 October 2000 Venue: Markievicz Park, Sligo Referee: Thomas Walsh (St. Michael's)	Manager:Declan McCabe Team: A. Carty; G. Foley; N. Carew; S. O'Neill (Capt); T. Watters; J. Joyce; B. Doyle; K. Quinn (0-1); S. Carty; T. McMahon; K. O'Neill (0-3); L. Healy (0-1); P. Hegarty (0-1); J. McPartland (0-4); K. Gilligan (0-1) Substitutes:
