= Commendable =

American-bred Thoroughbred racehorse

- Sire: Gone West
- Grandsire: Mr. Prospector
- Dam: Bought Twice
- Damsire: In Reality
- Sex: Stallion
- Foaled: 13 April 1997
- Country: United States
- Colour: Chestnut
- Breeder: Edward Kelly & Michael Kelly
- Owner: Robert B. & Beverly J. Lewis
- Trainer: D. Wayne Lukas
- Record: 12: 2-1-1
- Earnings: $907,470

Major wins
- Triple Crown race wins: Belmont Stakes 2000

Commendable (April 13, 1997 – April 10, 2014) was an American Thoroughbred racehorse, best known for his victory in the 2000 Belmont Stakes. In his racing career, he ran twelve times and won two races. After his racing career, he stood as a stallion in South Korea.

== Background ==
Commendable, a chestnut horse with a white blaze and four white feet, was sired by Gone West out of the mare Bought Twice, a half sister of the successful racehorse and sire Fappiano. As a yearling, he was consigned to the Keeneland July sales by the Taylor Made Agency, where he was bought for $575,000 by Robert and Beverly Lewis.

== Racing career ==
=== 1999: two-year-old season ===
Prior to the Belmont Stakes, Commendable earned $88,470 in seven races and his only win came in August 1999 in his debut: a Del Mar maiden race for two-year-olds. In his only other start at age two, he finished fourth in the Del Mar Futurity a month later. Despite his modest achievements in 1999, he was identified as a potential contender for the Triple Crown races by his trainer, D. Wayne Lukas.

=== 2000: three-year-old season ===
In 2000, Commendable lost four races leading up to the Triple Crown series, although he finished fourth in the San Felipe Stakes to Fusaichi Pegasus and the San Rafael Stakes to War Chant. In the Kentucky Derby, he finished seventeenth in a nineteen-horse field, after which his handlers chose not to run him in the Preakness Stakes.

On a sweltering day at Belmont, Commendable was among the outsiders for the third leg of the Triple Crown, despite the absence of leading three-year-olds Fusaichi Pegasus and Red Bullet. Lukas observed that he would need "a career best" to win. Ridden by Pat Day, Commendable raced prominently, took the lead half a mile from the finish and stayed on in the straight to hold off the 9/5 favorite Aptitude by a length and a half. The 67,000 crowd were reportedly stunned by the Commendable's win which was achieved in a slow time of 2:31.2.

Following his Belmont win, Commendable finished fourth in the Dwyer Stakes and then finished eighth of the nine starters in the Haskell Invitational Handicap. He later took third in the Travers Stakes and second behind Tiznow in the Super Derby. Commendable did not race again, and his retirement was announced in November.

== Stud record ==
He was retired to stud duty at Mill Ridge Farm in Lexington, Kentucky, where he remained until January 2005. He was then sold to the Korea Racing Association and exported to stand at a stud on Jeju Island, South Korea.

== Death ==
Commendable died on April 10, 2014, of complications of colic. His death at the Jangsu Stud Farm in Jeolla, South Korea was confirmed in June 2014.

== Pedigree ==
Pedigree of Commendable (USA), chestnut stallion, 1997
Sire Gone West (USA) 1984	Mr. Prospector; 1970	Raise a Native	Native Dancer
Sire Gone West (USA) 1984	Mr. Prospector; 1970	Raise a Native	Raise You
Sire Gone West (USA) 1984	Mr. Prospector; 1970	Gold Digger	Nashua
Sire Gone West (USA) 1984	Mr. Prospector; 1970	Gold Digger	Sequence
Sire Gone West (USA) 1984	Secrettame; 1978	Secretariat	Bold Ruler
Sire Gone West (USA) 1984	Secrettame; 1978	Secretariat	Somethingroyal
Sire Gone West (USA) 1984	Secrettame; 1978	Tamerett	Tim Tam
Sire Gone West (USA) 1984	Secrettame; 1978	Tamerett	Mixed Marriage
Dam Bought Twice (USA) 1986	In Reality; 1964	Intentionally	Intent
Dam Bought Twice (USA) 1986	In Reality; 1964	Intentionally	My Recipe
Dam Bought Twice (USA) 1986	In Reality; 1964	My Dear Girl	Rough'n Tumble
Dam Bought Twice (USA) 1986	In Reality; 1964	My Dear Girl	Itlis
Dam Bought Twice (USA) 1986	Killaloe; 1970	Dr. Fager	Rough'n Tumble
Dam Bought Twice (USA) 1986	Killaloe; 1970	Dr. Fager	Aspidistra
Dam Bought Twice (USA) 1986	Killaloe; 1970	Grand Splendor	Correlation
Dam Bought Twice (USA) 1986	Killaloe; 1970	Grand Splendor	Cequilla (Family: 16-a)
