= Belle's Good Cide =

American-bred Thoroughbred racehorse

- Sire: Slewacide
- Grandsire: Seattle Slew
- Dam: Belle of Killarney
- Damsire: Little Current
- Sex: Mare
- Foaled: 1993
- Country: United States
- Colour: Chestnut
- Breeder: John Smicklas
- Owner: Saratoga Thoroughbreds
- Record: 26: 2-1-6
- Earnings: $26,696

Belle's Good Cide (March 17, 1993 – March 8, 2003) was an Oklahoma-bred Thoroughbred racing mare best known as the dam of Funny Cide.

== Background ==
Belle's Good Cide was a chestnut mare bred by John Smicklas. She was sired by Slewacide out of Belle of Killarney (who also produced the stakes winning Belle of Cozzene). As a yearling she was sold for $2,800 at the 1994 Heritage Place Fall sale.

== Racing career ==
Belle's Good Cide raced for three years, starting 26 times, winning twice, and earning $26,696.

== Breeding record ==
As a broodmare Belle's Good Side's best offspring was the gelding Funny Cide, by Distorted Humor, who won the Kentucky Derby in 2003. Her other foals included Coincide (a grey colt by Cozzene) and Rockside (a bay filly by Personal Flag

In December 2001 she was consigned to the Fasig-Tipton Midlantic mixed sale and was bought for $3,500 by the Boniface family's Bonita Farm agentShe finished her life at McMahon of Saratoga Thoroughbreds in Saratoga Springs, New York where Funny Cide was born.

Belle's Good Cide was euthanized due to complications from colic in 2003 just after giving birth to her fourth foal, a chestnut colt by Mojave Moon and bred by Bonita Farm of Maryland. This happened shortly before Funny Cide's Kentucky Derby and Preakness Stakes victories. The foal was called Homicide and began racing in the year 2006. In 2008 he proved to be a successful point to point horse in Maryland.
