= Aptitude (horse) =

American thoroughbred racehorse

- Breed: Thoroughbred
- Sire: A.P. Indy
- Grandsire: Seattle Slew
- Dam: Dokki
- Damsire: Northern Dancer
- Sex: Stallion
- Foaled: March 27, 1997
- Country: USA
- Breeder: Juddmonte Farms
- Owner: Juddmonte Farms
- Trainer: Robert J. Frankel
- Jockey: Jerry D. Bailey
- Record: 15:5-4-2
- Earnings: $1,965,410

Major wins
- Jockey Club Gold Cup (2001); Saratoga Breeders' Cup Handicap (2001); Hollywood Gold Cup (2001)

Aptitude (March 27, 1997-April 30, 2012) was an American Thoroughbred racehorse, winner of the 2001 Jockey Club Gold Cup.

== Career ==
Aptitude's first race was on October 21, 1999, where he came in 6th place.

On January 1, 2000, he won his first race at Santa Anita Park.

He finished in 2nd place at both the 2000 Kentucky Derby and the 2000 Belmont Stakes.

On July 1, 2001, he won his first Grade 1 race, the Hollywood Gold Cup. He followed that victory up with a win on August 19, 2001, at the Saratoga Breeders' Cup Handicap.

Aptitude won the biggest race of his career by winning the Grade 1 2001 Jockey Club Gold Cup. He raced one last time at the 2001 Breeders' Cup Classic, coming in 8th.

== Stud career ==
Aptitude entered stud in 2002 at Juddmonte Farms in Kentucky. In 2007, he was shuttled to Argentina.

Aptitudes's descendants include:

c = colt, f = filly

Foaled	Name	Sex	Major Wins
2003	Amandatude	f	Polly's Jet Stakes
2003	Outperformance	c	Hill Prince Stakes
2004	Great Hunter	c	Breeders' Futurity Stakes, Breeders' Futurity Stakes
2006	Gallant (CAN)	c	Prince of Wales Stakes
2008	Al Qasr	c	Gran Premio 25 de Mayo

Aptitude died at Haras Vacacion on April 30, 2012. He is buried at Juddmonte Farms.

== Pedigree ==
Pedigree of Aptitude (USA), dark bay horse, 1997
Sire A.P. Indy 1989	Seattle Slew (USA); 1974	Bold Reasoning	Boldnesian
Sire A.P. Indy 1989	Seattle Slew (USA); 1974	Bold Reasoning	Reason to Earn
Sire A.P. Indy 1989	Seattle Slew (USA); 1974	My Charmer	Poker
Sire A.P. Indy 1989	Seattle Slew (USA); 1974	My Charmer	Fair Charmer
Sire A.P. Indy 1989	Weekend Surprise (USA); 1980	Secretariat	Bold Ruler
Sire A.P. Indy 1989	Weekend Surprise (USA); 1980	Secretariat	Somethingroyal
Sire A.P. Indy 1989	Weekend Surprise (USA); 1980	Lassie Dear	Buckpasser
Sire A.P. Indy 1989	Weekend Surprise (USA); 1980	Lassie Dear	Gay Missile
Dam Dokki (USA) 1986	Northern Dancer (CAN); 1961	Nearctic	Nearco
Dam Dokki (USA) 1986	Northern Dancer (CAN); 1961	Nearctic	Lady Angela
Dam Dokki (USA) 1986	Northern Dancer (CAN); 1961	Natalma	Native Dancer
Dam Dokki (USA) 1986	Northern Dancer (CAN); 1961	Natalma	Almahmoud
Dam Dokki (USA) 1986	Alluvial (USA); 1969	Buckpasser	Tom Fool
Dam Dokki (USA) 1986	Alluvial (USA); 1969	Buckpasser	Busanda
Dam Dokki (USA) 1986	Alluvial (USA); 1969	Bayou	Hill Prince
Dam Dokki (USA) 1986	Alluvial (USA); 1969	Bayou	Bourtai
