= Roman Ruler =

American thoroughbred racehorse

- Breed: Thoroughbred
- Sire: Fusaichi Pegasus
- Grandsire: Mr. Prospector
- Dam: Silvery Swan
- Damsire: Silver Deputy
- Sex: Stallion
- Foaled: 2002
- Died: 2017
- Country: USA
- Color: Dark bay stallion
- Breeder: Needham/Betz, Liberation Fm & Ashford Stud
- Owner: Fog City Stable
- Trainer: Bob Baffert
- Record: 10:5-2-1
- Earnings: $1,220,800

Major wins
- Norfolk Stakes (2004); Best Pal Stakes (2004); Dwyer Stakes (2005); Haskell Invitational (2005)

Roman Ruler (March 20, 2002 – January 25, 2017) was an American Thoroughbred racehorse, winner of the 2005 Haskell Invitational.

== Career ==
Roman Ruler's first race was on June 19, 2004, at Hollywood Park Racetrack, where he won on his debut. He followed it up with a win at the 2004 Best Pal Stakes on August 15, 2004. He then captured his third win of the year on October 3, 2004, in the Norfolk Stakes.

Ruler's next win came on July 4, 2005, in the Dwyer Stakes and on August 7, 2005, he won the 2005 Haskell Invitational.

He finished his career off with a second-place finish in the Goodwood Breeders' Cup Handicap, before retiring. Due to his successful year in 2005, he ranked in the 22nd place in the Top 100 Rankings.

He was also a successful sire, especially in Argentina, where his early death was a great loss to breeders.

== Death ==
Roman Ruler died on January 25, 2017.

== Stud career ==
Roman Ruler's descendants include:

c = colt, f = filly

Foaled	Name	Sex	Major Wins
2007	Rule	c	Monmouth Cup, Sam F. Davis Stakes, Delta Jackpot Stakes
2008	Ruler on Ice	c	Belmont Stakes
2009	Homeboykris	c	Champagne Stakes
2011	Artemis Agrotera	f	Gallant Bloom Handicap, Ballerina Stakes, Frizette Stakes
2014	Roman Rosso	c	Gran Premio Asociación Latinoamericana de Jockey Clubes e Hipódromos

== Pedigree ==
Pedigree of Roman Ruler (USA), 2005
Sire Fusaichi Pegasus (USA) 1997	Mr Prospector* (USA); 1970	Raise a Native	Native Dancer
Sire Fusaichi Pegasus (USA) 1997	Mr Prospector* (USA); 1970	Raise a Native	Raise You
Sire Fusaichi Pegasus (USA) 1997	Mr Prospector* (USA); 1970	Gold Digger	Nashua
Sire Fusaichi Pegasus (USA) 1997	Mr Prospector* (USA); 1970	Gold Digger	Sequence
Sire Fusaichi Pegasus (USA) 1997	Angel Fever (JPN); 1990	Danzig	Northern Dancer*
Sire Fusaichi Pegasus (USA) 1997	Angel Fever (JPN); 1990	Danzig	Pas de Nom
Sire Fusaichi Pegasus (USA) 1997	Angel Fever (JPN); 1990	Rowdy Angel	Halo
Sire Fusaichi Pegasus (USA) 1997	Angel Fever (JPN); 1990	Rowdy Angel	Ramhyde
Dam Silvery Swan (USA) 1994	Silver Deputy (CAN); 1985	Deputy Minister	Vice Regent*
Dam Silvery Swan (USA) 1994	Silver Deputy (CAN); 1985	Deputy Minister	Mint Copy
Dam Silvery Swan (USA) 1994	Silver Deputy (CAN); 1985	Silver Valley	Mr Prospector*
Dam Silvery Swan (USA) 1994	Silver Deputy (CAN); 1985	Silver Valley	Seven Valleys
Dam Silvery Swan (USA) 1994	Sociable Duck (USA); 1982	Quack	T.V. Lark
Dam Silvery Swan (USA) 1994	Sociable Duck (USA); 1982	Quack	Quillon
Dam Silvery Swan (USA) 1994	Sociable Duck (USA); 1982	Unsociable	Never Bend
Dam Silvery Swan (USA) 1994	Sociable Duck (USA); 1982	Unsociable	Vassar Grad

- Roman Ruler is inbred 2S x 4D to Mr. Prospector, meaning he appears in the second generation on the sire side and in the fourth generation on the dam side of his pedigree.
- Roman Ruler is inbred 4S x 5D to Northern Dancer, meaning he appears in the fourth generation on the sire side and in the fifth generation (via Vice Regent) on the dam side of his pedigree.
