= Fusaichi Concorde =

Japanese Thoroughbred racehorse

Fusaichi Concorde フサイチコンコルド
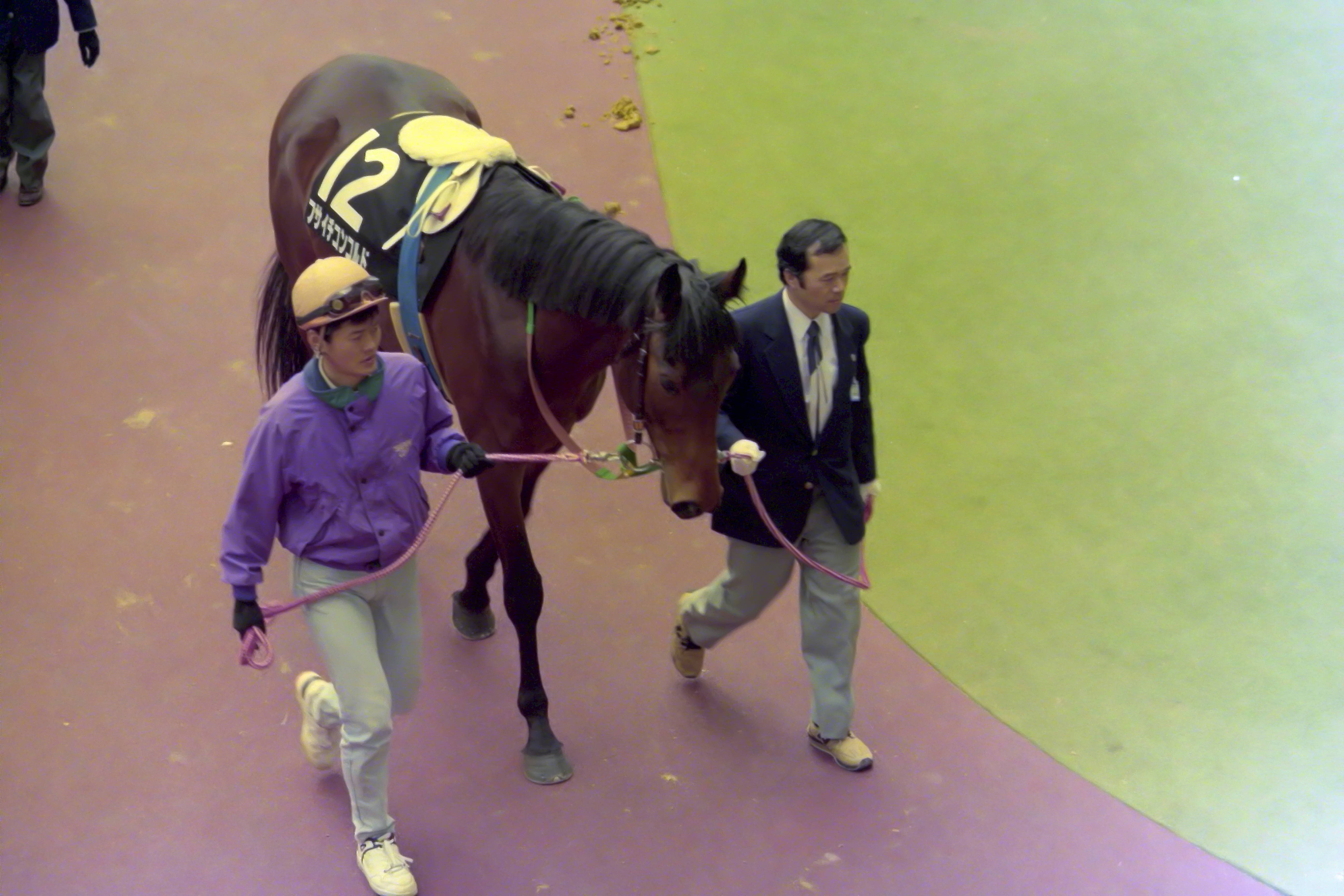
- Fusaichi Concorde at the Sumire Stakes
- Breed: Thoroughbred
- Sire: Caerleon
- Grandsire: Nijinsky II
- Dam: Ballet Queen
- Damsire: Sadler's Wells
- Sex: Stallion
- Foaled: February 11, 1993
- Died: September 8, 2014 (aged 21)
- Country: Japan
- Colour: Bay
- Breeder: Northern Farm
- Owner: Fusao Sekiguchi
- Racing colours
- Trainer: Minoru Kobayashi
- Jockey: Shinji Fujita
- Record: 5: 3-1-1
- Earnings: 234,158,000 yen

Major wins
- Japanese Classic Race wins: Tokyo Yushun (1996)
- Last updated on January 15, 2026

Fusaichi Concorde (Japanese: フサイチコンコルド, Hepburn: Fusaichi Konkorudo; February 11, 1993 – September 8, 2014) was a Japanese Thoroughbred racehorse who won the Tokyo Yushun in 1996. He was dubbed a "miracle derby" horse after winning the Tokyo Yushun in three races deep into his career. The commentator named his final spurt to the finish line in the Tokyo Yushun a sonic finishing kick. He only managed to run during his classic year as he suffered a career-ending tendonitis injury after the Kikuka Sho.

== Background ==
His dam, Ballet Queen who was pregnant with the French Derby winner horse, Caerleon was listed at Newmarket broodmare sale in England for 30 million yen. Katsumi Yoshida bought her for that price and after being quarantined, she arrived in Japan in January 1993.

The next month, Fusaichi Concorde who was her first foal was born. The aftermath of the foaling process was not pleasant as Ballet Queen bit her foal due to being stressed in a new environment. However, the staff jumped into the stable and managed to treat both of them to allow a smooth horse-to-human interaction process. He was then raised properly by her dam and by 1995, he was sold for 100 million yen to Fusao Sekiguchi and transferred from the Northern Farm to the Ritto Training Centre. His junior year training did not went well as he suffered a pneumonia up to 40 °C due to unstable body temperature. Despite this, his trainer Kobayashi devised a special training plan for him and believed that this horse could win the coveted Tokyo Yushun.

== Racing career ==
=== Three-year-old season (1996) ===
On January 8, he made his debut in at Kyoto Racecourse. He was the favorite to win and after a strong start, he closed in on the rival horse, surpassed them and won by a length and a half. He took a two-month break before winning his next race, the Sumire Stakes at Hanshin Racecourse. After this race, Kobayashi made a tough decision to abandon the Satsuki Sho due to Fusaichi Concorde's overheating problems when transporting from one place to another. With enough prize money gained from his previous two races, Fusaichi Concorde did not need another race but for the preparation, the team decided to try him in the Aoba Sho. This suggestion did not came to fruition as it coincided with the Golden Week, causing traffic jams to the racecourse which certainly unfit for the horse's weak condition. Then, they registered him for the Principal Stakes. However, upon arriving at the racecourse, the horse got a 38 °C fever, which denied him to race again.

Luckily, Fusaichi Concorde was fit for the targeted Tokyo Yushun. When the race began, Sakura Speed O started and lead with a slow pace. His main rival, Dance in the Dark started well and placed himself between third and fourth place while Fusaichi Concorde botched the start and ran between seventh and eighth position. At the final straight, Dance in the Dark started sprinting but Fusaichi Concorde moved to the outside and unleashed his final finishing burst in order to reach the line first, a neck in front of the second-placed Dance in the Dark. Fusaichi Concorde and Shinji Fujita became the first horse and jockey since 53 years after Kurifuji and Maeda Chokichi to have the Tokyo Yushun as their first major win. This is also the first G1 win for the owner, Sekiguchi.

His condition weakened after the race, causing him to miss on the Kyoto Shimbun Hai. In this situation, the team opted him for the Cassiopeia Stakes. he was the favourite for the race but lost out to Mejiro Suzumaru, who ran away early and finished five lengths ahead to take the win. The next race for him will be the Kikuka Sho where he came as the second favourite behind Dance in the Dark. In the race, Rosen Kavalier set up a slow pace that jumbled up the field. Despite that, Fusaichi Concorde ran pretty well in the middle field alongside Royal Touch and Dance in the Dark. In the final straight, both Dance in the Dark and Royal Touch surpassed Fusaichi Concorde and he ended up in third place. After the race, he suffered a periostitis injury and was sidelined until the next year. He was registered for the Tenno Sho (Spring) but cancelled due to another tendonitis injury. This injury eventually led towards his retirement. The retirement ceremony was held on November 16, 1997, at the Tokyo Racecourse, in which he came in with bandages on both injured legs.

== Racing form ==
Fusaichi Concorde won three races and placed in another two out of five starts. This data available on JBIS and netkeiba.

Date	Track	Race	Grade	Distance (Condition)	Entry	HN	Odds (Favored)	Finish	Time	Margins	Jockey	Winner (Runner-up)
1996 – three-year-old season
Jan 5	Kyoto	3yo Newcomer		1,800 m (Firm)	14	12	1.9 (1)	1st	1:49.9	–0.2	Shinji Fujita	(Hishi Beat)
Mar 9	Hanshin	Sumire Stakes	OP	2,200 m (Firm)	13	12	2.1 (1)	1st	2:16.0	–0.1	Shinji Fujita	(Saint Lyphard)
Jun 2	Tokyo	Tokyo Yushun	1	2,400 m (Firm)	17	13	27.6 (7)	1st	2:26.1	0.0	Shinji Fujita	(Dance in the Dark)
Oct 19	Kyoto	Cassiopeia Stakes	OP	2,000 m (Firm)	11	10	1.3 (1)	2nd	2:00.3	0.8	Shinji Fujita	Mejiro Suzumaru
Nov 3	Kyoto	Kikuka Sho	1	3,000 m (Firm)	17	4	5.0 (2)	3rd	3:05.2	0.1	Shinji Fujita	Dance in the Dark

Legend:
Turf

== Stud record and death ==
Fusaichi Concorde became a stud in 1998 at Shadai Stallion Station and Breeders Stallion Station, both in Hokkaido. He was funded by the 1.02 billion yen syndicate to be the stud. He retired in 2011 after the syndicate was abolished and moved out to Ota Farm in Aomori to spend the rest of his life. On September 6, 2014, he fell while grazing and broke his left hind leg. By the 7th, he was unable to stand up on his own, and passed away around 5:00 pm on September 8, 2014.

=== Major winners ===
c = colt, f = filly
bold = grade 1 stakes

Grade winners
Foaled	Name	Sex	Major Wins
1999	Balance of Game	c	Mainichi Okan, Sankei Sho All Comers, Nakayama Kinen (2x), St. Lite Kinen, Yayoi Sho, Niigata Nisai Stakes
2000	Blue Concorde	c	**Mile Championship Nambu Hai (3x), JBC Sprint/Mile (2x), Kashiwa Kinen, Tokyo Daishoten**, Keio Hai Nisai Stakes, Sirius Stakes, Procyon Stakes
2000	Osumi Haruka	f	Tulip Sho, Queen Stakes (2x), Fuchu Himba Stakes
2003	Moere Genius	c	Hakodate Nisai Stakes
2003	Paphiopedilum	f	TCK Distaff (2x)
2005	Diraqouee	c	Keihin Hai, Hokkaido Nisai Yushun
2008	Kanemasa Concorde	c	Hokkaido Nisai Yushun

==== Broodmare sire ====
- Jo Cappuccino (2006) : **NHK Mile Cup**, Silk Road Stakes, Falcon Stakes (by Manhattan Cafe)
- Osumi Ichiban (2009) : Diolite Kinen, Hyogo Championship (by Agnes Tachyon)
- Ukiyono Kaze (2010) : Fukushima Himba Stakes, Keeneland Cup, Queen Cup (by On Fire)

== Pedigree ==
Pedigree of Fusaichi Concorde
Sire Caerleon (USA) 1980	Nijinsky (CAN); 1967	Northern Dancer (CAN); 1961	Nearctic (CAN); 1954
Sire Caerleon (USA) 1980	Nijinsky (CAN); 1967	Northern Dancer (CAN); 1961	Natalma (USA); 1957
Sire Caerleon (USA) 1980	Nijinsky (CAN); 1967	Flaming Page (CAN); 1959	Bull Page (USA); 1947
Sire Caerleon (USA) 1980	Nijinsky (CAN); 1967	Flaming Page (CAN); 1959	Flaring Top (USA); 1947
Sire Caerleon (USA) 1980	Foreseer (USA); 1969	Round Table (USA); 1954	Princequillo (GB); 1940
Sire Caerleon (USA) 1980	Foreseer (USA); 1969	Round Table (USA); 1954	Knights Daughter (GB); 1941
Sire Caerleon (USA) 1980	Foreseer (USA); 1969	Regal Gleam (USA); 1964	Hail to Reason (USA); 1958
Sire Caerleon (USA) 1980	Foreseer (USA); 1969	Regal Gleam (USA); 1964	Miz Carol (USA); 1953
Dam Ballet Queen (IRE) 1988 FNo: 1-l	Sadler's Wells (USA); 1981	Northern Dancer (CAN); 1961	Nearctic (CAN); 1954
Dam Ballet Queen (IRE) 1988 FNo: 1-l	Sadler's Wells (USA); 1981	Northern Dancer (CAN); 1961	Natalma (USA); 1957
Dam Ballet Queen (IRE) 1988 FNo: 1-l	Sadler's Wells (USA); 1981	Fairy Bridge (USA); 1975	Bold Reason (USA); 1968
Dam Ballet Queen (IRE) 1988 FNo: 1-l	Sadler's Wells (USA); 1981	Fairy Bridge (USA); 1975	Special (USA); 1969
Dam Ballet Queen (IRE) 1988 FNo: 1-l	Sun Princess (IRE); 1980	English Prince (IRE); 1971	Petingo (GB); 1965
Dam Ballet Queen (IRE) 1988 FNo: 1-l	Sun Princess (IRE); 1980	English Prince (IRE); 1971	English Miss (IRE); 1955
Dam Ballet Queen (IRE) 1988 FNo: 1-l	Sun Princess (IRE); 1980	Sunny Valley (IRE); 1972	Val de Loir (FR); 1959
Dam Ballet Queen (IRE) 1988 FNo: 1-l	Sun Princess (IRE); 1980	Sunny Valley (IRE); 1972	Sunland (GB); 1965

- Fusaichi Concorde was an inbred by 3 x 3 to Northern Dancer and 4 x 5 to Hail to Reason (Bold Reason's sire)
- Fusaichi Concorde was a half-sibling of Born King (Keisei Hai's winner) and Unrivaled (Satsuki Sho's winner).
