= Joe Orseno =

American Thoroughbred racehorse trainer (born 1955)

Personal information
- Born: October 4, 1955 (age 70) Philadelphia, Pennsylvania, U.S.
- Occupation: Trainer

Horse racing career
- Sport: Horse racing
- Career wins: 1,584+ (ongoing)

Major racing wins
- Pennsylvania Governor's Cup Handicap (1986); Ladies Handicap (1997); Gazelle Stakes (1998); Delaware Handicap (1999); Queen Elizabeth II Challenge Cup (1999, 2000); Sands Point Stakes (1999); Selene Stakes (1999); Diana Handicap (2000); Eclipse Stakes (2000); Gotham Stakes (2000); Grey Breeders' Cup Stakes (2000); Pimlico Special (2000); Stephen Foster Handicap (2000); Black Helen Handicap (2001); Flamingo Stakes (2001); Pennsylvania Derby (2001); Massachusetts Handicap (2002); Miss Woodford Stakes (2005); Regret Stakes (2009) American Classics / Breeders' Cup wins: Preakness Stakes (2000); Breeders' Cup Juvenile (2000); Breeders' Cup Filly & Mare Turf (2000)

Racing awards
- New York Turf Writers C.V. Whitney Award (2000)

Significant horses
- Basqueian, Macho Uno, Perfect Sting, Red Bullet, Golden Missile

Joseph F. Orseno (born October 4, 1955 in Philadelphia) is an American Thoroughbred racehorse trainer. He began his career as a professional trainer in 1977 and in 1997 joined Frank Stronach's racing stables. In 2000, Orseno conditioned Red Bullet, an upset winner of the Preakness Stakes. He went on to win two Breeders' Cup races that fall: the Juvenile with Macho Uno and the Filly & Mare Turf with Perfect Sting.

In July 2002, Joe Orseno returned to running a public stable.
