= Slewacide =

American-bred Thoroughbred racehorse

- Sire: Seattle Slew
- Grandsire: Bold Reasoning
- Dam: Evasive
- Damsire: Buckpasser
- Sex: Stallion
- Foaled: 1980
- Country: United States
- Colour: Bay
- Breeder: Lazy E Ranch
- Owner: Lazy E Ranch
- Record: 1: 0-0-1
- Earnings: $2,160

Slewacide (1980–2000) was an American thoroughbred racehorse foaled in Oklahoma. He was out of the Buckpasser mare, Evasive, by the undefeated 1977 Triple Crown winner, Seattle Slew.

Raced only once, Slewacide is best known as the broodmare sire of Kentucky Derby and Preakness Stakes winner, Funny Cide.

Upon retirement, Slewacide produced such stakes winners as Clevor Trevor, Mr. Ross, and Slew of Damascus.

On September 2, 2000, he was euthanized due to infirmities of old age.
