= Red Bullet =

American-bred Thoroughbred racehorse

- Sire: Unbridled
- Grandsire: Fappiano
- Dam: Cargo
- Damsire: Caro (IRE)
- Sex: Stallion
- Foaled: April 13, 1997 (in Kentucky)
- Died: August 7, 2026 (age 29)
- Country: United States
- Colour: Chestnut
- Breeder: Adena Springs
- Owner: Stronach Stables
- Trainer: Joe Orseno
- Record: 14: 6-2-2
- Earnings: $1,161,920

Major wins
- Gotham Stakes (2000); Foggy Road Stakes (2002); Triple Crown classic race wins : Preakness Stakes (2000)
- Last updated on August 30, 2007

Red Bullet (April 13, 1997 – August 7, 2026) was an American Thoroughbred racehorse, who was best known for winning the 2000 Preakness Stakes.

== Background ==
Red Bullet is a chestnut horse bred and raced by auto parts magnate Frank Stronach. He was sired by Unbridled, the 1990 American Champion 3-Year-Old Male Horse and winner of that year's Breeders' Cup Classic. His dam, Cargo, was a daughter of French multiple Grade 1 winner Caro. Red Bullet was trained during his racing career by Joe Orseno.

== Racing career ==
Red Bullet did not race at age two. Sent to the track at age three in 2000, he started six times, winning his first three starts. In that third race, Red Bullet ran in the Grade II Gotham Stakes at Aqueduct Racetrack and won handily, finishing the mile in 1:34.27. He then ran second to Fusaichi Pegasus in the 2000 Wood Memorial Stakes, a Grade I race also at Aqueduct. Afterward, his handlers felt it was not in the colt's best interest to run in the Kentucky Derby. Instead, they prepared him for the Preakness, the second leg of the U.S. Triple Crown series.

=== Preakness Stakes ===
In the Preakness Stakes, Kentucky Derby winner Fusaichi Pegasus was made the heavy odds-on betting favorite at 3–10. Red Bullet was listed as the second choice at 6–1 in the mile and three sixteenths classic at Pimlico Race Course. In the race, Red Bullet started slowly from post four. Jockey Jerry Bailey immediately restrained the colt passing the stands in seventh place six and a half lengths back in the small field of eight. Running into the clubhouse turn, he took an awkward step and drifted back to last, ten lengths behind the leader, Hugh Hefner. The fractions were fast at :46-3/5 for the first half and 1:11-1/5 for the six furlongs. Then Red Bullet gradually worked his way forward, passing Impeachment and Captain Steve on the back stretch. Moving into the far turn, Red Bullet started weaving between other colts, overtaking them one at a time until he passed the two leaders, Fusaichi Pegasus and speedster High Yield. At the top of the stretch, he took over the lead and started drawing away from the Kentucky Derby champion with every stride. He won by 3¾ lengths over Fusaichi Pegasus, who was a head in front of both Impeachment and Captain Steve for the third and fourth spots. Red Bullet paid $14.40 to win in front of a capacity crown of 111,821 at the Baltimore, Maryland, track.

=== Later racing ===
Red Bullet's connections, owner Frank Stronach and trainer Joe Orseno, did not enter him in the third leg of the Triple Crown, the 1½ mile Belmont Stakes. They felt his best distance were races that ranged between one mile and a mile and a quarter.

Racing as a four-year-old, Red Bullet won an allowance race out of his three starts and at age five, raced another three times with his best result a win in the Foggy Road Stakes and a second-place finish behind Sir Bear in the 2002 Skip Away Handicap.

== Stud record ==
Retired at the end of the 2002 racing season, Red Bullet began stud duty the following year at his owner's Adena Springs South in Williston, Florida.

He is the sire of Fatal Bullet, Canadian Horse of the Year, and Cool Bullet (winner of the Hansel Stakes).

== Death ==
On August 7, 2026, Red Bullet died in Ocala, Florida.

== Pedigree ==
Pedigree of Red Bullet
Sire Unbridled Bay 1987	Fappiano Bay 1977	Mr. Prospector; Bay 1970	Raise A Native
Sire Unbridled Bay 1987	Fappiano Bay 1977	Mr. Prospector; Bay 1970	Gold Digger
Sire Unbridled Bay 1987	Fappiano Bay 1977	Killaloe; Bay 1970	Dr. Fager
Sire Unbridled Bay 1987	Fappiano Bay 1977	Killaloe; Bay 1970	Grand Splendor
Sire Unbridled Bay 1987	Gana Facil Chestnut 1981	Le Fabuleux chesnut 1961	Wild Risk
Sire Unbridled Bay 1987	Gana Facil Chestnut 1981	Le Fabuleux chesnut 1961	Anguar
Sire Unbridled Bay 1987	Gana Facil Chestnut 1981	Charedi; Brown 1976	In Reality
Sire Unbridled Bay 1987	Gana Facil Chestnut 1981	Charedi; Brown 1976	Magic
Dam Cargo Bay 1989	Caro (IRE) Gray 1967	Fortino; Gray 1959	Grey Sovereign
Dam Cargo Bay 1989	Caro (IRE) Gray 1967	Fortino; Gray 1959	Ranavalo
Dam Cargo Bay 1989	Caro (IRE) Gray 1967	Chambord; Chestnut 1955	Chamossaire
Dam Cargo Bay 1989	Caro (IRE) Gray 1967	Chambord; Chestnut 1955	Life Hill
Dam Cargo Bay 1989	Aerturas (FR) chestnut 1981	Manado; Bay 1973	Captain's Gig
Dam Cargo Bay 1989	Aerturas (FR) chestnut 1981	Manado; Bay 1973	Slipstream
Dam Cargo Bay 1989	Aerturas (FR) chestnut 1981	Amiel; Bay 1976	Nonoalco
Dam Cargo Bay 1989	Aerturas (FR) chestnut 1981	Amiel; Bay 1976	Alea (Family: 16-h)
