= 2000 Prix de l'Arc de Triomphe =

- Location: Longchamp Racecourse
- Date: October 1, 2000
- Winning horse: Sinndar

The 2000 Prix de l'Arc de Triomphe was a horse race held at Longchamp on Sunday 1 October 2000. It was the 79th running of the Prix de l'Arc de Triomphe.

The winner was Sinndar, a three-year-old colt trained in Ireland by John Oxx. The winning jockey was Johnny Murtagh.

== Race details ==
- Sponsor: Groupe Lucien Barrière
- Purse: 10,500,000 F; First prize: 6,000,000 F
- Going: Good
- Distance: 2,400 metres
- Number of runners: 10
- Winner's time: 2m 25.8s

Pos.	Marg.	Horse	Age	Jockey	Trainer (Country)
1		Sinndar	3	Johnny Murtagh	John Oxx (IRE)
2	1½	Egyptband	3	Olivier Doleuze	Criquette Head (FR)
3	3	Volvoreta	3	Olivier Peslier	Carlos Lerner (FR)
4	2½	Montjeu	4	Michael Kinane	John Hammond (FR)
5	nk	Hightori	3	Gérald Mossé	Philippe Demercastel (FR)
6	1½	Samum	3	Andrasch Starke	Andreas Schütz (GER)
7	½	Daring Miss	4	Christophe Soumillon	André Fabre (FR)
8	½	Russian Hope	5	Thierry Jarnet	Henri-Alex Pantall (FR)
9	10	Hesiode	3	Frankie Dettori	Jean-Claude Rouget (FR)
10	8	Raypour	3	Niall McCullagh	John Oxx (IRE)

- Abbreviation: nk = neck

== Winner's details ==
Further details of the winner, Sinndar.

- Sex: Colt
- Foaled: 27 February 1997
- Country: Ireland
- Sire: Grand Lodge; Dam: Sinntara (Lashkari)
- Owner / Breeder: HH Aga Khan IV
