= Noel Chance =

Irish racehorse trainer

Noel Chance (born 18 December 1951) is a retired Irish racehorse trainer who was based at Upper Lambourn, Berkshire.

Chance retired from training in 2013 after a career which began in Ireland and lasted for 38 years. He trained two winners of the Cheltenham Gold Cup with Mr Mulligan in 1997 and Looks Like Trouble in 2000.
