= James Kearins =

Sligo Gaelic footballer and manager

James Kearins is a former Gaelic footballer. Kearins played for St Patrick's football club and was manager of the Sligo county team. Mickey Kearins is a brother of James Kearins.

James Kearins played for Sligo from 1974 until 1987. In 1975 he won a Connacht Senior Football Championship medal. In 1995 Kearins led Ballymote to a Sligo Intermediate Football Championship. In 2000 Kearins led Bunninadden to their first Sligo Senior Football Championship title in over eight decades. In 2003 he was appointed manager of Sligo’s senior football team, a position that involves setting game strategies and supervising the team’s coach. He was simultaneously made manager of Sligo’s team for players under age 21. Kearins resigned as Sligo manager at the end of 2004, reportedly over a disagreement about the inaugural Tommy Murphy Cup.

Kearins worked for Garda Síochána, the national police service of Ireland. Kearins’ Garda assignments included Sargeant in Ballymote, and Detective Inspector for 5 years during part of which he was stationed in Carrick-on-Shannon. From in 2007 until his retirement in 2010, Kearins was Sligo's Garda Superintendent. Garda officers have a long history of representing the police service in Gaelic athletics.
