= Fusao Sekiguchi =

Japanese businessman and racehorse owner

- 関口房朗
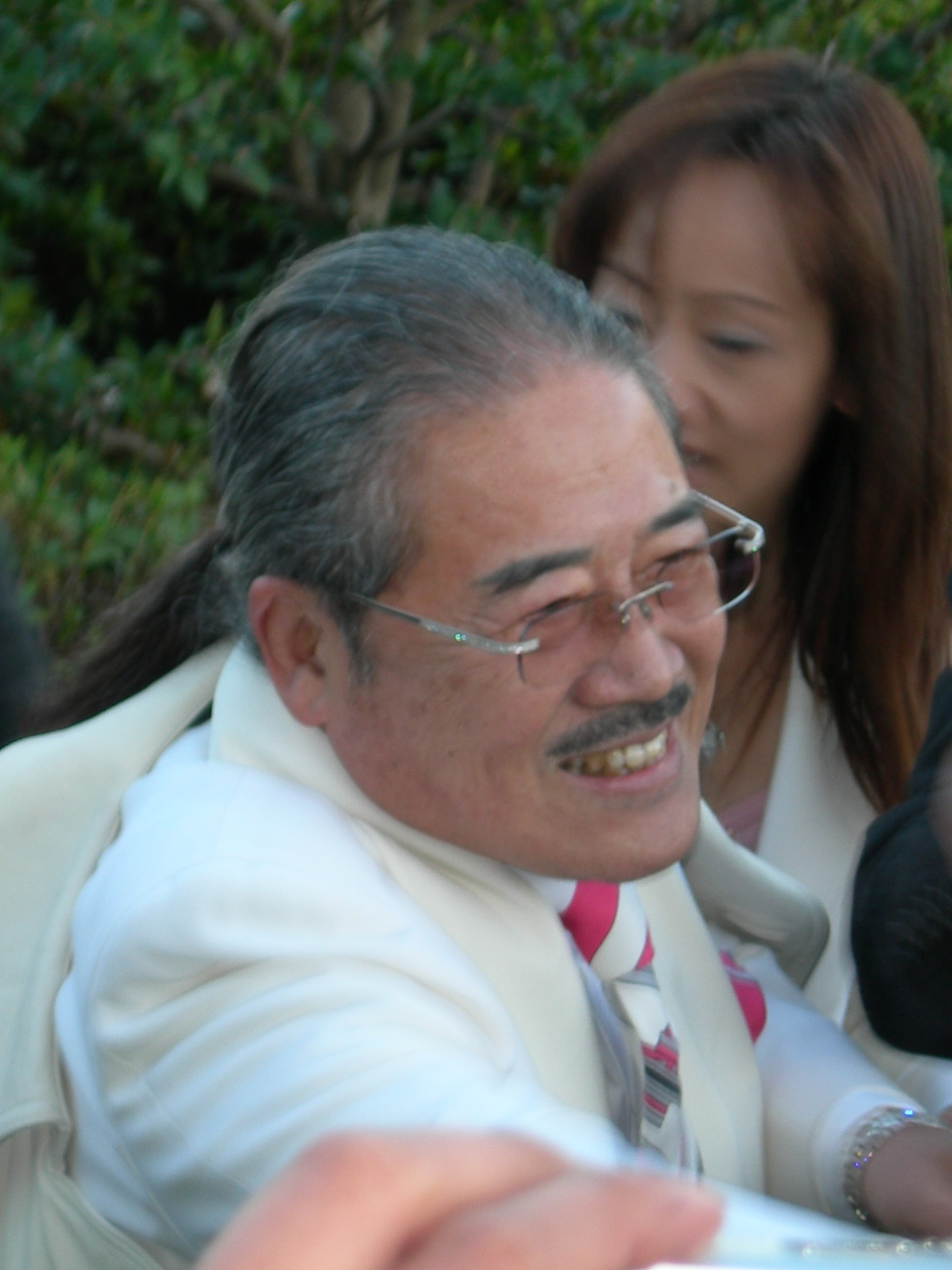
- Sekiguchi at the 2006 Queen Elizabeth II Cup
- Born: December 20, 1935 (age 90)
- Known for: Founder of Meitec Corporation and VSN; Owner of successful racehorses
- Children: 2

Fusao Sekiguchi (関口房朗) (born December 20, 1935, in Amagasaki, Hyogo, Japan) is a businessman and Thoroughbred horse racing enthusiast. He was the founder and CEO of Meitec in Nagoya before also founding Venture Safe Net, Inc (VSN, Inc) of Tokyo.

The owner of a number of racehorses, the most notable of which was 2000 Kentucky Derby winner Fusaichi Pegasus whom he sold for a reported US$64 million to Ireland's Coolmore Stud. Other successful thoroughbred horses Sekiguchi has owned include Tokyo Yushun winner Fusaichi Concorde and Fusaichi Pandora, winner of the 2006 Q.E.II Cup and dam of Almond Eye.
