= Looks Like Trouble =

Irish-bred Thoroughbred racehorse (1992–2025)

- Racing silks of Michael & Gerry Worcester and Tim Collins
- Sire: Zaffaran
- Grandsire: Assert
- Dam: Lavengaddy
- Damsire: Balgaddy
- Sex: Gelding
- Foaled: 7 May 1992
- Died: 10 April 2025 (aged 32)
- Country: Ireland
- Colour: Bay
- Breeder: Stephen Reel
- Owner: Michael & Gerry Worcester; Universal Conference & Incentive Travel; Tim Collins
- Trainer: Noel Chance
- Record: 18: 8-2-2
- Earnings: £336,017

Major wins
- RSA Chase (1999); Pillar Chase (2000); Cheltenham Gold Cup (2000); James Nicholson Wine Merchant Champion Chase (2000)
- Last updated on 12 April 2025

Looks Like Trouble (7 May 1992 – 10 April 2025) was an Irish-bred British-trained Thoroughbred racehorse. A specialised steeplechaser, he was trained by Noel Chance. He raced between February 1997 and June 2003 and won eight of his eighteen races, including the 2000 Cheltenham Gold Cup.

After finishing second in a point-to-point in Ireland, Looks Like Trouble joined the stables of trainer Noel Chance in Upper Lambourn. His first season in Britain (1997/1998) saw him race three times in novice hurdle races, coming fifth, second and third. The following season (1998/1999) he competed in novice chases and secured three victories, including the RSA Chase at the 1999 Cheltenham Festival, in which he was ridden by Paul Carberry.

Looks Like Trouble started the 1999/2000 season with third place in the Charlie Hall Chase, ridden for the first time by Norman Williamson. The pair went on to win a race at Sandown by a distance before pulling up in the King George VI Chase at Kempton Park. In January 2000 they won the Pillar Chase on Festival Trials Day by a distance. Before the Cheltenham Gold Cup, Looks Like Trouble's owner fell out with Williamson and the ride was given to Richard Johnson. Starting at 9/2 joint second favourite, Looks Like Trouble won by five lengths in spite of a blunder at the tenth fence. In second place was the other joint second favourite Florida Pearl, while the favourite, previous year's Gold Cup winner See More Business, was fourth.

Looks Like Trouble raced only once in the 2000/2001 season, winning the James Nicholson Wine Merchant Champion Chase under Johnson at Down Royal in November 2000. He did not race again for over a year due to a tendon injury. On his return to the racecourse in January 2002, he won the John Bull Chase at Wincanton under Seamus Durack. He was then reunited with Johnson for the 2002 Cheltenham Gold Cup, in which he trailed in last of the thirteen finishers. After the race, he was found to have a recurrence of his tendon injury and his trainer announced his retirement. He came out of retirement in June 2003 to win a charity race with Brendan Powell at Newbury. He was then entered in the Queen Alexandra Stakes at the 2003 Royal Ascot meeting. It was his only appearance on the flat. Ridden by Richard Hughes, he finished ninth of the 13 runners, being virtually pulled up in the final furlong. After the race he was retired for good and lived with Richard Johnson and his family until his death on 10 April 2025, at the age of 33.
