= Captain Steve =

American-bred Thoroughbred racehorse

- Sire: Fly So Free
- Grandsire: Time For A Change
- Dam: Sparkling Delite
- Damsire: Vice Regent
- Sex: Stallion
- Foaled: March 1, 1997
- Country: United States
- Colour: Chestnut
- Breeder: Roger Laubach
- Owner: Michael E. Pegram
- Trainer: Bob Baffert
- Record: 25: 9-3-7
- Earnings: $6,828,356

Major wins
- Breeders' Futurity Stakes (1999); Hollywood Futurity (1999); Kentucky Jockey Club Stakes (1999); Swaps Stakes (2000); Kentucky Cup Classic Handicap (2000); Iowa Derby (2000); Donn Handicap (2001); Dubai World Cup (2001)
- Last updated on August 4, 2007

Captain Steve (March 1, 1997 – April 21, 2013) was an American Thoroughbred racehorse. He was bred by Roger Laubach, raised by Cecil "Buddy" Williams, owned by Michael E. Pegram, and trained by Bob Baffert. A Chestnut foal by Fly So Free out of Sparkling Delite (by Vice Regent), he started 25 times, and earned $6,828,356.

== Racing history ==
At age 2, Captain Steve won the 1999 Grade II Breeders' Futurity Stakes, the Grade I Hollywood Futurity, and the Grade II Kentucky Jockey Club Stakes. He came in third in the Grade II Del Mar Futurity and the Grade III Best Pal Stakes.

At age 3, he won the 2000 Grade I Swaps Stakes, the Grade II Kentucky Cup Classic Handicap, and the Iowa Derby. He placed in the Grade I Haskell Invitational Handicap and the Grade II Goodwood Handicap, and came in third in the Grade I Breeders' Cup Classic, the Grade I Santa Anita Derby, the Grade II Louisiana Derby, and the Grade II Santa Catalina Stakes. Captain Steve finished eighth behind winner Fusaichi Pegasus in the 2000 Kentucky Derby.

At age 4, he won the Grade I Donn Handicap and the Group I Dubai World Cup. (UAE) He placed in the then-Grade II Stephen Foster Handicap, and showed in the Grade III San Diego Handicap.

From his 25 starts, he won 9, placed three times, and showed seven times.

== Stud period ==
In 2001, he was sold to the Japan Racing Association for $5,000,000 to stand at Shizunai Stud for 1,800,000 Yen.

== Origin of name ==
Captain Steve is named after Captain Steve Thompson, the head of the Louisville Police Department's criminal investigation division in 1997. After attending the 1997 Kentucky Derby, owner Michael E. Pegram received a birthday present from his girlfriend. He didn't unwrap the present, which contained a gun, prior to attempting to clear security at the Louisville International Airport the day after the Derby and police arrested Pegram for possession of a .357 Magnum. Pegram's best friend, trainer Bob Baffert, winner of the Kentucky Derby the previous day with Silver Charm, called the Louisville Police Department and spoke with Captain Thompson. After listening to Baffert's story, Captain Thompson intervened with the presiding judge, drove to the police station and picked up Pegram. When the 1997 chestnut son of Fly So Free came along, Pegram is reported as saying, "I want to name him Captain Steve, after my savior."

== Death ==
Captain Steve died on April 21, 2013, at Schichinohe Stallion Station in northern Japan from acute heart failure. He was 16.
