= 2000 Belmont Stakes =

American horse race

132nd Belmont Stakes
- Belmont Stakes
- Location: Belmont Park; Elmont, New York, U.S.
- Date: June 10, 2000
- Distance: 1 1/2 mi (12 furlongs; 2,414 m)
- Winning horse: Commendable
- Winning time: 2:31.19
- Final odds: 18.80 (to 1)
- Jockey: Pat Day
- Trainer: D. Wayne Lukas
- Owner: Robert B. Lewis
- Conditions: Fast
- Surface: Dirt
- Attendance: 67,810

The 2000 Belmont Stakes was the 132nd running of the Belmont Stakes and the 96th time the event took place at Belmont Park in Elmont, New York.

In a field of 11 horses, the 1 1/2-mile race was won by Commendable.

== Payout ==
Pgm	Horse	Win	Place	Show
3	Commendable	$39.60	$12.80	$6.30
5	Aptitude		$3.80	$2.80
1	Unshaded			$4.40

- $2 Exacta (3-5) paid $213.00
- $2 Trifecta (3-5-4) paid $1,310.00
- $2 Superfecta (3-5-4-9) paid $9,315.00

== Full results ==
Finish	PP	Time/ behind	Horse	Jockey	Trainer	Owner	Final Odds	Winnings
1	3	2:31.19	Commendable	Pat Day	D. Wayne Lukas	Robert B. Lewis	18.80	$600,000
2	5	1 1/2	Aptitude	Alex Solis	Robert J. Frankel	Juddmonte Farms	1.75	$200,000
3	4	1	Unshaded	Shane Sellers	Carl Nafzger	James B. Tafel	5.50	$110,000
4	9	6	Wheelaway	Richard Migliore	John C. Kimmel	Caesar P Kimmel	5.70	$60,000
5	8	3 1/4	Impeachment	Craig Perret	Todd Pletcher	Dogwood Stable	6.40	$30,000
6	1	6 3/4	Appearing Now	Mike Luzzi	Juan Ortiz	John Valentino	63.50	
7	2	2 1/4	Postponed	Edgar Prado	Flint S. Schulhofer	Jeanne G. Vance	13.00	
8	10	1 1/4	Hugh Hefner	Jorge F. Chavez	Martin F. Jones	Edward Nahem	40.25	
9	11	1	Tahkodha Hills	Eibar Coa	Ralph Ziadie	Centaur Farms	48.25	
10	6	Neck	Globalize	Mike E. Smith	Jerry Hollendorfer	Litt & Todaro Hollendorfer	10.60	
11	7	(eased)	Curule	Jerry D. Bailey	Saeed bin Suroor	Godolphin Racing	7.80	

== See also ==
- 2000 Kentucky Derby
- 2000 Preakness Stakes
