= Robert B. Lewis =

American businessman

Robert B. "Bob" Lewis (May 12, 1924 – February 17, 2006) was an American businessman who owned a number of champion Thoroughbred racehorses during the 1990s and 2000s.

== Life and career ==
Bob Lewis was born in Minneapolis and grew up in Glendale, California. He served in the United States Army during World War II before studying at the University of Oregon. At Oregon, Lewis was a member of Delta Tau Delta fraternity. After graduating, he worked in Los Angeles as a beer salesman. In 1956, he started his own company, the Foothill Beverage Company, which became one of the biggest Anheuser-Busch distributors in the country.

Active philanthropists, the Lewises have a number of charitable works including a $5 million donation to the Pomona Valley Hospital to help establish the Robert and Beverly Lewis Family Cancer Care Center.

== Thoroughbred horse racing ==
In 1990, Lewis and his wife, Beverly J. Lewis, bought their first Thoroughbreds. They became dedicated owners, spending millions at yearling sales and hiring first class trainers such as Bob Baffert and D. Wayne Lukas. The couple's first major success came when Timber Country won 1994 Breeders' Cup Juvenile then in 1995, the Preakness Stakes. At the same time, their filly, Serena's Song, was voted the U.S. Champion 3-Year-Old Filly for 1995. After retiring, in 2002 Serena's Song was inducted in the National Museum of Racing and Hall of Fame. That year they were voted the Big Sport of Turfdom Award.

Other well known horses owned by the Lewises include Silver Charm, winner of the 1997 Kentucky Derby and Preakness Stakes, and the 1998 Dubai World Cup, the richest horse race in the world. In 1999, their colt Charismatic also won the Derby and Preakness and was voted United States Horse of the Year.

The Lewises had six Eclipse Award winning horses. After Silver Charm won the Kentucky Derby and Preakness Stakes in 1997, the couple were voted the Eclipse Award of Merit, the American Thoroughbred horse racing industry's highest honor. Charismatic repeated his stablemate's success in 1999 but broke a leg in the Belmont Stakes. Commendable won the Belmont Stakes in 2000 wearing Lewis' colors. Orientate won the Breeders' Cup Sprint in 2002 while Folklore won the Breeders' Cup Juvenile Fillies championship.

Bob Lewis died on February 17, 2006. In 2007, Santa Anita Park in Arcadia, California, renamed the Santa Catalina Stakes in his honor. On October 20, 2017, his wife Beverly died at the age of 90 after a lengthy illness.
