= Fusaichi Pegasus =

American Thoroughbred racehorse (1997–2023)

- Sire: Mr. Prospector
- Grandsire: Raise a Native
- Dam: Angel Fever
- Damsire: Danzig
- Sex: Stallion
- Foaled: April 12, 1997; Stone Farm, Bourbon County, Kentucky, U.S.
- Died: May 23, 2023 (aged 26); Ashford Stud, Woodford County, Kentucky, U.S.
- Country: United States
- Colour: Bay
- Breeder: Arthur B. Hancock III and Stonerside Ltd.
- Owner: Fusao Sekiguchi
- Trainer: Neil Drysdale
- Record: 9: 6–2–0
- Earnings: $1,994,400

Major wins
- San Felipe Stakes (2000); Jerome Handicap (2000); Wood Memorial Stakes (2000); American Classic Race wins: Kentucky Derby (2000)

Honours
- Statue at Northern Horse Park, Hokkaidō, Japan

Fusaichi Pegasus (Japanese: フサイチペガサス, Japanese pronunciation: [ɸɯ̥saꜜitɕi pegasas]; April 12, 1997 – May 23, 2023) was an American Thoroughbred racehorse who won the 2000 Kentucky Derby, and subsequently set a record at auction—selling for US$70,000,000 to Coolmore Stud.

== Background ==
Nicknamed "Fu Peg", Fusaichi Pegasus was a son of Mr. Prospector and Angel Fever, a mare by leading sire Danzig. At the time of his breeding, he was nicknamed "Superman" by his breeder, Arthur Hancock.

In July 1998, the colt was purchased as a yearling at the Keeneland sale by Fusao Sekiguchi for $4 million, which was the highest price paid for a Kentucky Derby winner at the time. His name is a combination of his owner's name, "Fusao", and the Japanese word for one, "ichi", to mean No. 1 or the best; the second half of his name came from that of a winged horse in Greek mythology.

== Racing career ==
In early 2000, Fusaichi Pegasus won the Grade 2 San Felipe Stakes and Wood Memorial Stakes.

Fusaichi Pegasus won the 2000 Kentucky Derby in a time of 2:01.12 for the 1 1/4 mile distance. At the time, it was the seventh fastest time in Kentucky Derby history; by the time of his death, it was the tenth fastest time. He was the first favorite to win the Kentucky Derby since Spectacular Bid in 1979 and the first horse to win the Kentucky Derby without winning a race as a two-year-old since Proud Clarion in 1967. He was also the last Kentucky Derby winner to be sired by Mr. Prospector.

After the Derby, he lost to Red Bullet in the Preakness Stakes. After his loss in the Preakness Stakes, he did not race in the third leg of the Triple Crown, the Belmont Stakes.

On November 4, he made his final career start in the Breeder's Cup Classic, finishing a disappointing sixth.

== Retirement and stud record ==
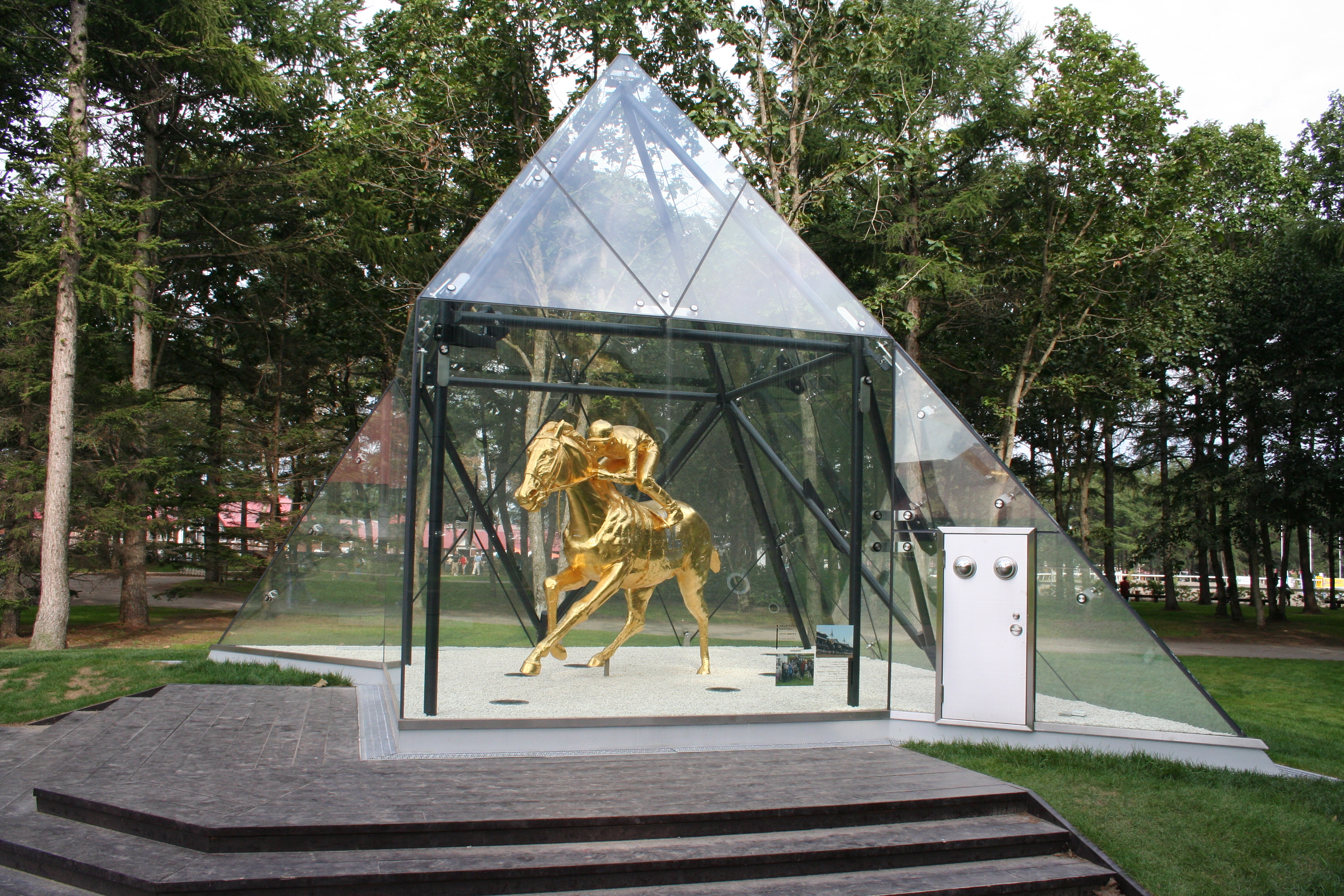
Statue of Fusaichi Pegasus in Tomakomai, Hokkaido, Japan

In 2000, he was sold to Irish breeder Coolmore Stud for a reported price of more than US$70,000,000 (£35,000,000). The previous record for a stallion prospect was US$40m (£24m), paid in 1983 for Shareef Dancer. During his first decade as a stallion, he split his time between Coolmore's Ashford Stud in Ireland and Coolmore's Australian breeding operation. He shuttled in 2008 to Haras Don Alberto in Chile, and also shuttled into Uruguay. Among his progeny are Grade 1 winners Bandini, Roman Ruler, Champ Pegasus, and Haradasun.

His son Roman Ruler produced Ruler on Ice, winner of the 2011 Belmont Stakes.

He was pensioned from stud duty after the 2020 breeding season.

At age 26, Fusaichi Pegasus was euthanized on May 23, 2023, due to the effects of old age.

== Pedigree ==
Pedigree of Fusaichi Pegasus (USA), bay stallion, 1997
Sire Mr Prospector (USA) 1970	Raise a Native (USA); 1961	Native Dancer	Polynesian
Sire Mr Prospector (USA) 1970	Raise a Native (USA); 1961	Native Dancer	Geisha
Sire Mr Prospector (USA) 1970	Raise a Native (USA); 1961	Raise You	Case Ace
Sire Mr Prospector (USA) 1970	Raise a Native (USA); 1961	Raise You	Lady Glory
Sire Mr Prospector (USA) 1970	Gold Digger(USA); 1962	Nashua	Nasrullah
Sire Mr Prospector (USA) 1970	Gold Digger(USA); 1962	Nashua	Segula
Sire Mr Prospector (USA) 1970	Gold Digger(USA); 1962	Sequence	Count Fleet
Sire Mr Prospector (USA) 1970	Gold Digger(USA); 1962	Sequence	Miss Dogwood
Dam Angel Fever (USA) 1990	Danzig (USA); 1977	Northern Dancer	Nearctic
Dam Angel Fever (USA) 1990	Danzig (USA); 1977	Northern Dancer	Natalma
Dam Angel Fever (USA) 1990	Danzig (USA); 1977	Pas de Nom	Admiral's Voyage
Dam Angel Fever (USA) 1990	Danzig (USA); 1977	Pas de Nom	Petitioner
Dam Angel Fever (USA) 1990	Rowdy Angel (USA); 1979	Halo	Hail to Reason
Dam Angel Fever (USA) 1990	Rowdy Angel (USA); 1979	Halo	Cosmah
Dam Angel Fever (USA) 1990	Rowdy Angel (USA); 1979	Ramhyde	Rambunctious
Dam Angel Fever (USA) 1990	Rowdy Angel (USA); 1979	Ramhyde	Castle Hyde (Family: 8-c)
