= 2010 in sports =

2010 in sports will describe the year's events in world sport.

== Events by month ==
=== January ===
- 24th-31st Bandy World Championship in Moscow, Russia. Winner: Sweden

=== February ===
- 7 American football, (Florida) , (United States) Super Bowl XLIV. Winner: (Louisiana) New Orleans Saints.
- 12 – 28: Olympics, (International Olympic Committee) / 2010 Winter Olympics. Winner: Canada.

=== April ===
- 25: Marathon, (United Kingdom) London Marathon. Winners: (Ethiopia) Tsegaye Kebede, (Russia) Liliya Shobukhova

=== May ===
30: IndyCar Series, USA 2010 Indianapolis 500 Winner: Dario Franchitti

=== June ===
- 3 - 17: Basketball, (United States) / (Canada) 2010 NBA Finals. Winner: (California) Los Angeles Lakers.
- 11–11 July: Association football, (South Africa) 2010 FIFA World Cup. Winner: Spain.

=== July ===
The ashes

=== August ===
- 28–12 September: Basketball, (Turkey) 2010 FIBA World Championship. Winner: United States.

=== September ===
- 23–3 October: Basketball, (Czech Republic) 2010 FIBA World Championship for Women. Winner: United States.
- 26: Formula One, 2010 Singapore Grand Prix. Winner: (Spain) Fernando Alonso.
- 26: Marathon, (Germany) Berlin Marathon. Winners: (Kenya) Patrick Makau, (Ethiopia) Aberu Kebede.

=== October ===
- 3 - 14: Multi-sport event, 2010 Commonwealth Games, Delhi, India. Winner: Australia
- 10: Marathon, (United States) Chicago Marathon. Winners: (Kenya) Samuel Wanjiru, (Russia) Liliya Shobukhova.
- 24: Formula One, (South Korea) 2010 Korean Grand Prix. Winner: (Spain) Fernando Alonso.

=== November ===
- 7: Marathon, (United States) New York City Marathon. Winners: (Ethiopia) Gebregziabher Gebremariam, (Kenya) Edna Kiplagat.
- 12 - 27: Multi-sport event, 2010 Asian Games, Guangzhou, China. Winner: China

== American football ==
=== January ===
- The Alabama Crimson Tide defeats the Texas Longhorns 37–21 in the BCS National Championship Game at the Rose Bowl, thereby claiming the 2009 National Championship in College Football.

=== February ===
- Super Bowl XLIV – the New Orleans Saints (NFC) won 31–17 over the Indianapolis Colts (AFC)
  - Location: Sun Life Stadium
  - Attendance: 74,059
  - MVP: Drew Brees, QB (New Orleans)
- For the third consecutive year, the proposed All American Football League, originally intended to launch in 2008, delays its planned debut, this time until 2011.

=== March ===
- Another proposed league, the United National Gridiron League, announces that it has indefinitely suspended operations.

=== April ===
- The new incarnation of the Arena Football League, consisting mostly of teams from the now-dissolved AF2, makes its debut. Although the new AFL is a separate corporate entity from the original AFL, it purchased the assets of the original league in a bankruptcy auction, enabling it to brand itself as a continuation of the original.

=== August ===
- August–September: New Meadowlands Stadium, the new home of the New York Giants and Jets, opened on August 16 with a pre-season game between the two teams, with the Jets as the designated home team. The Giants won this matchup 31–16. After winning a coin flip between the two teams, the Giants played the first regular-season game in the stadium on September 12, defeating the Carolina Panthers 31–18. The Jets played the Baltimore Ravens in their home opener the following night on Monday Night Football, losing 10–9.
- August 20 – The Spokane Shock defeat the Tampa Bay Storm 69–57 at home to win ArenaBowl XXIII.

=== September ===
- Reggie Bush, currently with the Saints, announced that he would forfeit his 2005 Heisman Trophy after his involvement with marketing agents while playing at USC led to severe NCAA penalties against the school. USC had already returned its copy of Bush's Heisman and the football program cut ties with Bush.

=== December ===
- Brett Favre, Quarterback of the Minnesota Vikings was listed inactive against the New York Giants, which was played at Ford Field home of the Detroit Lions after the Vikings stadium, the Hubert H. Humphrey Metrodome, collapsed due to heavy snow. This was the first time since 1991 that Favre did not start a game, ending his NFL consecutive-streak record at 297.

== Aquatics ==
=== January/February ===
- 29 January–8 February Swimming at the 2010 South Asian Games in Dhaka, Bangladesh

=== July ===
- 13–18 2010 FINA Men's Water Polo World League (The Super Final was held in Niš, Serbia)
- 18–23 Swimming at the 2010 Central American and Caribbean Games in Mayaguez, Puerto Rico
- 27 July - 1 August 2010 FINA Men's Water Polo World Cup in Oradea, Romania

=== August ===
- 4–15 2010 European Aquatics Championships in Budapest, Hungary. The total aquatics medal table was won by Russia with 13 gold medals, 7 silver, 8 bronze. Germany was second in the total medal table with 8 gold, 9 silver, 3 bronze. France was third with 8 gold, 8 silver and 7 bronze. The swimming medal table had slightly different order. Russia was second, France first and Great Britain third. France got 8 gold medals, 7 silver, 6 bronze. Russia got 7 gold, 4 silver, 1 bronze. Great Britain got 6 gold, 6 silver and 6 bronze. Diving medal table was totally different: Germany was first, Ukraine second and Italy third. Germany got 5 gold, 3 silver, but no bronze. Ukraine got 2 gold, 2 silver and 0 bronze. Italy got 1 gold, two silver, but no bronze for Italy either. Synchronized Swimming medal table had only three countries. Russia was first, Ukraine second and Spain third. Italy won the open water medal table, Greece was second and Germany third. Water Polo Championships were held separately.
- 18-22 2010 Pan Pacific Swimming Championships in Irvine California, United States

=== September ===
- 13–29 2010 African Swimming Championships

=== October ===
- 4–13 Swimming, Diving and Synchronized Swimming at the 2010 Commonwealth Games in Delhi, India

=== November ===
- 12–27 Aquatics (Swimming, Diving, Water polo and Synchronized swimming) at the 2010 Asian Games in Guangzhou, China.
- 25–28 2010 European Short Course Swimming Championships in Eindhoven, Netherlands. Germany won the medal table with 10 gold, 8 silver, 4 bronze. Host country Netherlands was second with 9 gold, 8 silver and 5 bronze. Hungary was third with 6 gold, 1 silver and two bronze.

=== December ===
- 15-19 2010 FINA World Swimming Championships (25 m) in Dubai, United Arab Emirates. United States was the winner of the medal table with 12 golf medals, 6 silver and 7 bronze. Second in the medal table was Russia with 4 gold, 4 silver and 2 bronze medals. Spain was third with 4 gold medals, two silver and two bronze.

== Association football ==
=== January ===
- 10th—31st – Africa Cup of Nations, Angola. Winner – Egypt
- Pachuca win the CONCACAF Champions League.
- PRK Hekari United win the OFC Champions League.
- Atlético Madrid win the UEFA Europa League.
- Internazionale win the UEFA Champions League.

=== June/July ===
- June 11 – July 11 – FIFA World Cup, South Africa. Winner – Spain

=== July/August ===
- July 13 – August 1 – FIFA U-20 Women's World Cup, Germany.

Winner – Germany

- Internacional win the Copa Libertadores

=== September ===
- 5th—25th – FIFA U-17 Women's World Cup, Trinidad and Tobago – (South Korea) Korea Republic
- LDU Quito win the 2010 Recopa Sudamericana
- Seongnam Ilhwa win the AFC Champions League
- TP Mazembe win the CAF Champions League
- Internazionale win the FIFA Club World Cup

== Athletics ==
=== March ===
- 12th–14th – IAAF World Indoor Championships in Doha, Qatar.
- 27th – IAAF World Cross Country Championships in Bydgoszcz, Poland.

=== May ===
- May 14 – August 27 – IAAF Diamond League, worldwide track and field meeting series.
- May 15–16 – IAAF World Race Walking Cup in Chihuahua, Mexico.

=== July/August ===
- July 27 – August 1 – European Athletics Championships in Barcelona, Spain.

=== October ===
- October 16 – IAAF World Half Marathon Championships in Nanning, China

== Australian rules football ==
=== September ===
- 25th – 2010 AFL Grand Final – Collingwood drew with St Kilda in the first Grand Final, 9.14 (68) – 10.8 (68). Collingwood won the replay by 56 points on October 2, 16.12 (108) – 7.10 (52). It was the first drawn AFL Grand Final since 1977.

== Bandy ==
- 24–31 January Bandy World Championship in Moscow, Russia – Sweden wins
- Bandy World Cup, October – (Russia) Dynamo Kazan wins

== Baseball ==
=== April ===
- 2nd – Target Field in Minneapolis, the first stadium built specifically for the Minnesota Twins, opens with the Twins losing to the St. Louis Cardinals 8–4 in a spring training game.
- 12th – Target Field hosts its first regular-season game, with the Twins defeating the Boston Red Sox 5–2.

=== May ===
- 9th – Dallas Braden of the Oakland Athletics pitches the 19th perfect game in Major League Baseball history in a 4–0 home win over the Tampa Bay Rays.
- 29th – Roy Halladay of the Philadelphia Phillies pitches the 20th perfect game in MLB history in a 1–0 road win over the Florida Marlins. This marks the first time in the modern era that two perfect games have been thrown in the same MLB season.

=== June ===
- 2nd – Armando Galarraga of the Detroit Tigers loses out on a perfect game when the 27th batter, the Cleveland Indians' Jason Donald, is called safe on an infield grounder. Immediately after the game, umpire Jim Joyce admitted that he had blown the call. The Tigers won 3–0.

=== July ===
- 13th – The 81st Major League Baseball All-Star Game at Angel Stadium of Anaheim, Anaheim, California is won by the National League for the first time since 1996. Brian McCann, whose three-run double in the seventh inning gives the NL all of its runs in the 3–1 game, is named MVP.

George Steinbrenner owner of the New York Yankees dies of a heart attack at St. Joseph's Hospital in Tampa Bay, Florida.

=== September ===
- September 7 – Trevor Hoffman, closing pitcher for the Milwaukee Brewers become the first closing pitcher in the history of the MLB to record 600 career saves, at Miller Park in Milwaukee, Wisconsin against the St. Louis Cardinals.

=== October ===
- 6th – In Game 1 of the National League Division Series, Halladay no-hits the Cincinnati Reds in the Phillies' 4–0 win. Halladay becomes only the second pitcher to throw a no-hitter in postseason play, after Don Larsen's perfect game in Game 5 of the 1956 World Series.
- 22nd – The Texas Rangers defeat the New York Yankees in the ALCS to advance to their first World Series.
- 23rd – The San Francisco Giants defeat the Philadelphia Phillies in the NLCS to advance to their fourth World Series since relocating to San Francisco.

=== November ===
- 1st – The San Francisco Giants defeat the Texas Rangers to win the 2010 World Series 4–1.
- 7th – The Chiba Lotte Marines defeat the Chunichi Dragons to win the 2010 Japan Series 4–2–1.

=== December ===
- 2nd – Ron Santo former 3rd baseman of the Chicago Cubs dies due to complications from bladder cancer and diabetes in a Scottsdale, Arizona hospital.
- Legendary Milwaukee Brewers baseball announcer and former Milwaukee Braves catcher Bob Uecker, who played on the Braves during the 1957 World Series in which the Braves won, undergoes two successful heart surgeries, one during the baseball season, and one following it, and gets inducted into the WWE Hall of Fame.
- The Milwaukee Brewers reveal a statue in honor of Baseball Commissioner Allen H. "Bud" Selig a native of Milwaukee, Wisconsin and who helped bring the Brewers to Milwaukee (formerly the Seattle Pilots) after the departure of the 1957 World Series champions, Milwaukee Braves.

== Basketball ==
=== February ===
- 14th – A crowd of 108,713, the largest in the sport's history, packs Cowboys Stadium in Arlington, Texas for the 2010 NBA All-Star Game. The East defeats the West 141–139, with the Miami Heat's Dwyane Wade, representing the East, being named MVP.
- NCAA men's tournament — Duke defeats Butler 61–59 at Lucas Oil Stadium, 6 miles (9.7 km) from Butler's campus in Indianapolis. It is the fourth national title for both Duke and its head coach Mike Krzyzewski. Duke's Kyle Singler is named Most Outstanding Player.
- NCAA women's tournament — Connecticut completes their second consecutive 39–0 season with a 53–47 win over Stanford at the Alamodome in San Antonio. It is the seventh national title and fourth unbeaten season for both the Huskies and their head coach Geno Auriemma. The Most Outstanding Player award goes to UConn's Maya Moore.
- Euroleague — Regal FC Barcelona wins the title in Paris.

=== June ===
- NBA Finals — The Los Angeles Lakers defeat the Boston Celtics in seven games for the Lakers' 16th NBA title.

=== August/September ===
- August 28 – September 12 – 2010 FIBA World Championship in Turkey — (gold) United States (silver) Turkey (bronze) Lithuania. MVP: Kevin Durant (USA)
- September 23 – October 3- 2010 FIBA World Championship for Women in the Czech Republic — (gold) United States (silver) Czech Republic (bronze) Spain. MVP: Hana Horáková (Czech Republic).

=== December ===
- 21st — The University of Connecticut women's team wins its 89th consecutive game, surpassing the NCAA Division I record previously held by the UCLA men's team of 1971–1974.
- 30th – UConn's record winning streak ends at 90 when the Huskies lose 71–59 to Stanford.

== Boxing ==
- March 13 – Manny Pacquiao defeats Joshua Clottey by controlling the fight from start to finish, leading to Pacquiao winning by a unanimous decision. The fight was the first boxing match held at Cowboys Stadium in Arlington, Texas in front of over 41,000 people. This was Pacquiao's first defense of his newly awarded WBO welterweight title.
- March 20 – Wladimir Klitschko knocks out Eddie Chambers with a fierce left that hits Chambers in the temple with only five seconds left in the fight. The punch knocked Chambers out nearly instantly, with him collapsing to the canvas and hanging off the last rope. This was Klitschko's first defense of his Ring magazine heavyweight title, his fourth defense of his WBO heavyweight title, and his eighth defense of his IBF and IBO heavyweight titles.
- March 27 – Pongsaklek Wonjongkam defeats Kōki Kameda by a majority decision to win the WBC flyweight title and vacant Ring magazine flyweight title. This is the second time Wonjongkam has become the WBC flyweight champion, after first winning the title in March 2001. Wonjongkam defended the title seventeen times, until he lost to Daisuke Naito in July 2007. This fight is later named the best flyweight fight of 2010 by Ring magazine.
- April 17 – Kelly Pavlik loses to Sergio Martínez in a close fight for Pavlik's WBC, WBO, and Ring magazine middleweight titles. Martínez controlled the early rounds with quick in and out movements, refusing to heavily engage with Pavlik. Martínez managed to cut Pavlik's left eyebrow in the first round. Pavlik then started to mount a comeback in the middle rounds by blocking Martínez's punches more effectively. Pavlik spent most of his time headhunting trying to land a hard right, which did help Pavlik get a knockdown in the seventh round. In the late rounds Martínez came back and started to open up Pavlik's cuts more, making his face extremely blood. In the post fight interview Pavlik said he couldn't see due to the blood. Martínez ended up winning the fight with a unanimous decision.
- April 24 – Mikkel Kessler upsets Carl Froch by a unanimous decision to win Froch's WBC super middleweight title. The fight was part of the second-group stage of the Super Six World Boxing Classic. Following the fight, Froch complained about a judging bias, seeing how the fight was held in Kessler's country of origin, Denmark. This fight was later named the best super middleweight fight of 2010 by Ring magazine.
- April 30 – In a stunning upset, Fernando Montiel knocksout Hozumi Hasegawa ending his five-year, 10 title defense streak and taking his WBC bantamweight title. The knockout came as a surprise due to Hasegawa seeming to be clearly leading until the end of the fourth, when Montiel landed a left punch that stunned Hasegawa and pushed him back to the ropes, where he unloaded on him until the referee stopped the fight.
- May 1 – Floyd Mayweather Jr. defeats Shane Mosley to continue his undefeated career streak. Mosley came out strong for the first two rounds—at one point making Mayweather's knees buckle—but Mayweather went on to control the fight.
- May 8 – Making his comeback after roughly 15½ months of being suspended, Antonio Margarito defeated Roberto Garcia to win the vacant WBC international super welterweight title.
- May 15 – Amir Khan dominates Paul Malignaggi to win by TKO in the eleventh round to retain his WBA light welterweight title for the second time. This was Khan's debut in the United States.
- May 22 – In their fourth fight against each other Rafael Márquez evens the series to two wins for each man by stopping Israel Vázquez by TKO in the third round.
- June 5 – Miguel Cotto defeats Yuri Foreman by a ninth round stoppage due to a leg injury Foreman suffered during the fight. In an amazing display of will, Foreman refused to quit despite being in what he later called a "very sharp pain". A towel was thrown in the ring, but it was ruled to have come from an outside source, and the fight continued for another minute until being stopped officially. This was Cotto's debut at light middleweight. The fight was the first boxing match in the new Yankee stadium built in 2009, and the first match in either Yankee stadium since Ali/Norton 3 in 1976.
- July 31 – In a rematch of 2009's fight of the year, Juan Manuel Márquez defeats Juan Díaz for a second time to retain his WBO lightweight title and to win the WBA super world lightweight title.
- August 14 – Jean Pascal upsets Chad Dawson by a technical decision due to an accidental headbutt that caused a major cut over Dawson's right eye and the fight was stopped by the ringside doctor. However Pascal easily won the fight according to the judge's scorecards. Pascal defended his WBC light heavyweight title for the third time, won Dawson's IBO light heavyweight title, and filled the vacant Ring magazine light heavyweight title.
- August 28 – Giovanni Segura upsets Iván Calderón by a knockout in the eighth round to win the WBO and WBA super world light flyweight titles. Segura ends Calderón's undefeated 34-fight winning record. This fight would later be named both the best light flyweight and overall fight of the year of 2010 by Ring magazine.
- September 11 – Yuriorkis Gamboa defeats Orlando Salido to unified the WBA world and vacant IBF featherweight titles. Gamboa was knocked down in the eighth round and was docked two points in the twelfth round. While Salido was knocked down twice in the twelfth round.
- November 6 – Juan Manuel López defeats Rafael Márquez by TKO, in an exciting fight that was stopped early due to Márquez suffering a shoulder injury following the eighth round. López defends his WBO featherweight title and improves his record to 30–0. This fight is later named the best featherweight fight of 2010 by Ring magazine.
- November 13 – Manny Pacquiao destroys Antonio Margarito to the WBC super welterweight title, making Pacquiao the first and so far only boxer to win world titles in eight different weight classes. Following the fight, Margarito is sent to a hospital with a fractured orbital bone, which requires surgery. This was Margarito's first major fight in over 21 months, following a knockout loss to Shane Mosley in January 2009.
- November 20 – In a highly anticipated rematch, Sergio Martínez knocks out Paul Williams in the second round to retain his WBC and Ring magazine middleweight titles. This fight was later named knockout of the year by Ring magazine.
- November 27 – Juan Manuel Márquez defeats Michael Katsidis by ninth-round TKO. Katsidis was competitive throughout the fight and even scored a knockdown on Márquez in the third round. While Márquez fought a more solid fight, landing many combinations. Márquez defends his WBO, WBA, and Ring magazine lightweight titles. This fight is later named the best lightweight fight of 2010 by Ring magazine.
- December 11 – Amir Khan defeats Marcos Maidana in a relatively close decision. Khan came out strong in the early part of the fight, by applying heavy pressure on Maidana and getting a knockdown late in the first round. However, in the later parts of the fight Khan spent much of his time avoiding Maidana trying to endure through rounds. At one point Maidana appeared to have almost finished Khan in the tenth round, when he landed a huge punch. However Khan absorbed the punishment and did enough in the early rounds to win by a unanimous decision. Khan defended his WBA world light welterweight title for the third time. This fight is later named the best light welterweight fight of 2010 by Ring magazine.
- December 11 – Abner Mares defeats Vic Darchinyan by a spit decision, to start Showtime's second boxing tournament based on the Super Six World Boxing Classic. However instead featured only four fighters, a single elimination format, and was focused on the bantamweight division at 118 lbs (54 kg) under the title, The Bantamweight Tournament: Winner Takes All. This fight was later named the best bantamweight fight of 2010 by Ring magazine.
- December 18 – After twelve rounds of boxing, Jean Pascal vs. Bernard Hopkins ends in a controversial majority draw.

== Canadian football ==
- November 28 – 98th Grey Cup is held at Commonwealth Stadium in Edmonton — Montreal Alouettes defeat Saskatchewan Roughriders 21–18.

== Cricket ==
- January 15–30 — 2010 U-19 Cricket World Cup, New Zealand
- April 30, – May 16, — 2010 ICC World Twenty20, West Indies
- June 15–24 — 2010 Asia Cup, Sri Lanka
- September 10–26 — 2010 Champions League Twenty20, South Africa
- November 25, 2010 – January 7, 2011 — 2010–11 Ashes series, Australia

== Cycling ==
- March 20 Milan–San Remo Óscar Freire wins first monument of the year over Tom Boonen in predicted sprint finish.
- April 4 Tour of Flanders Fabian Cancellara defeats home favourite Tom Boonen as 1 million people line the streets of Northern Belgium for the Unesco heritage race, famous for its culture, beautiful forests and brutal cobbled hills. Cancellara attacked first on the Molenberg with 44 km to go and Boonen was the only one who could follow. With 15 km to go Cancellara launched a powerful attack on the Muur-Kapelmuur using the last metres of the hill and descent to create a big gap. Once the gap was created, the world tt champion was always favourite and had time to celebrate.
- April 11 Paris–Roubaix Fabian Cancellara launched a surprising attack with over 45 km to go while Boonen was taking a drink behind. The Swiss, nicknamed Spartacus, showed incredible strength to stretch out the gap to over 4 minutes over the rest, before relaxing in the final kilometres to celebrate becoming one of the few people to achieve the Flanders Roubaix double in the same week.
- April 24 Liège–Bastogne–Liège Alexander Vinokourov came out victorious over Alexander Kolobnev with whom he worked to set up a 2-man finish. Vino attacked with 15 km to go, with many teams hesitant to bring him back, as drag Vinos teammate Alberto Contador, would then attack. With 9 km to go an elite group behind formed and home favourite Philippe Gilbert launched an all or nothing attack. Gilbert halved the 40 second deficit, but Vino and Kolobnev used their 2-man advantage to tire him out and ultimately contested the finish among themselves with Vino riding away to celebrate a successful comeback at the age of 36.
- May 8–30 Giro d'Italia Ivan Basso won what was considered to be one of the greatest Grand Tours of all time. With surprisingly exciting stages in the first week, including crashes in the Netherlands a ttt and a tough stage through the mud of Strade Bianchi, the race was blown apart on stage 12 when a group of 30 riders, including climbers David Arroyo and Carlos Sastre got a 12-minute lead. This forced the other contenders to push hard in the very difficult mountains of the 3rd week. Cadel Evans Michelle Scarponi Vincenzo Nibali and Basso took minutes over the leaders on 3 mountain stages, one of which was a mountain finish on the Monte Zoncolan, the hardest mountain in Grand Tour history, lined by hundreds of thousands of fans. The race came down to a difficult stage over the extremely difficult Passo di Mortirolo with a finish in Aprica. Basso needed 3 minutes to take the jersey from Arroyo, and looked likely to get it after taking 2 minutes on the ascent of the climb. But Arroyo surprised the world of cycling with an amazing descent of the mountain in very dangerous conditions, taking back 1 minute 30. The final twist came with the final climb into Aprica, were Basso, helped by teammate Nibali, and stage winner Scarponi, was able to take 3 minutes on Arroyo, gaining the jersey and a 2nd Giro win.
- July 3–25 Tour de France Alberto Contador won his 3rd Tour de France and 5th Grand Tour after a close duel with young Luxembourger Andy Schleck. The two were always comfortable, and close to each other, but the onus was on Schleck who was considered to be a far weaker time trial cyclist. Going into the stage on the Col du Tourmalet Schleck needed to get a gap over Contador, but, although he won the stage, Contador finished just behind Schleck and won the Tour on the time trial two days later.
- August 1–7 Tour de Pologne Dan Martin
- August 28–19 Vuelta a España Vincenzo Nibali won his first Grand Tour after putting in a surprisingly strong performance on the decisive stage. The strong favourite at the halfway point had been Igor Antón but the Euskaltel–Euskadi rider had an unfortunate crash and was forced to abandon. This left the Italian to fight it out with Galician climber Ezequiel Mosquera. Mosquera got time in several mountain stages, and needed 40 seconds on the final stage over the very steep Bola del Mundo. Huge crowds cheered on Mosquera as he attacked with 3 km and he was able to initially get 20 seconds. But Nibali came back and caught Mosquera in the last few metres, and though he was unable to overtake the Spaniard for the stage win, he was the overall winner.
- September 29–October 3 UCI Road World Championships Women's Time trial – Emma Pooley. Men's Time Trial – Fabian Cancellara. Women's Road Race – Giorgia Bronzini. Men's Road Race – Thor Hushovd won an epic race which looked to finish in anything but a sprint finish, until the last few kilometres. Several groups kept forming in attacks that looked likely to succeed, but ultimately always got brought back. Favourite Philippe Gilbert expected attack finally came on the 1st climb of the last lap. But as he was caught by a 2nd group, the peloton surprisingly appeared just behind them with 3 k to go and a sprint finish it turned out to be.
- October 17 Giro di Lombardia – Philippe Gilbert made up for his failure at the worlds with a 2nd victory in the final monument of the season. The Belgian was simply too strong throughout and never looked like losing. After a crash took out Nibali, Gilbert was left on his own, and waited for Michele Scarponi for support. But the Italian, who is superior in Grand Tours, was out of his depth contesting a one-day race against the classic specialist, who waltzed away with ease in the last few kilometres.

== Equestrian ==
- February 18 – February 28 – 2010 Arctic Equestrian Games, Norway
- September 25 – October 10 – 2010 FEI World Equestrian Games, Lexington, Kentucky

== Floorball ==
- Men's World Floorball Championships
  - Champion: Finland
- Women's under-19 World Floorball Championships
  - Champion: Sweden
- EuroFloorball Cup
  - Men's champion: (Sweden) Storvreta IBK
  - Women's champion: (Sweden) IKSU innebandy

== Futsal ==
- UEFA Futsal Championship, Hungary – Spain
- 2010 Grand Prix de Futsal, Brazil – Brazil

== Golf ==
- April 20 - Lorena Ochoa announced her retirement from professional golf, leaving her 4-year streak as world's number one ranked player.

Major championships

- The Masters winner: Phil Mickelson
- U.S. Open winner: Graeme McDowell
- The Open Championship winner: Louis Oosthuizen
- PGA Championship winner: Martin Kaymer

Women's major championships

- Kraft Nabisco Championship winner: Yani Tseng
- LPGA Championship winner: Cristie Kerr
- U.S. Women's Open winner: Paula Creamer
- Women's British Open winner: Yani Tseng

Senior major championships

- Senior PGA Championship winner: Tom Lehman
- Senior British Open winner: Bernhard Langer
- U.S. Senior Open winner: Bernhard Langer
- The Tradition winner: Fred Funk
- Senior Players Championship winner: Mark O'Meara

== Gymnastics ==
- 2010 European Men's Artistic Gymnastics Championships
- 2010 European Women's Artistic Gymnastics Championships
- 2010 Rhythmic Gymnastics European Championships
- 2010 World Artistic Gymnastics Championships
- 2010 World Rhythmic Gymnastics Championships

== Handball ==
- European Men's Handball Championship – France

== Horse racing ==
Steeplechases

- Cheltenham Gold Cup – Imperial Commander
- Grand National – Don't Push It
- Grand Steeple-Chase de Paris – Polar Rochelais
- Nakayama Grand Jump – Merci Mont Saint

Flat races

- Australia:
  - Cox Plate – So You Think
  - Melbourne Cup – Americain
- Canadian Triple Crown:
  1. Queen's Plate – Big Red Mike
  2. Prince of Wales Stakes – Golden Moka
  3. Breeders' Stakes – Miami Deco
- Dubai, United Arab Emirates: Dubai World Cup – Glória de Campeão
- France: Prix de l'Arc de Triomphe – Workforce
- Hong Kong: Hong Kong International Races
  - Hong Kong Vase – Mastery
  - Hong Kong Sprint – J J the Jet Plane
  - Hong Kong Mile – Beauty Flash
  - Hong Kong Cup – Snow Fairy
- Ireland: Irish Derby – Cape Blanco
- Japan: Japan Cup – Rose Kingdom
- English Triple Crown:
  1. 2,000 Guineas Stakes – Makfi
  2. The Derby – Workforce
  3. St. Leger Stakes – Arctic Cosmos
- United States Triple Crown:
  1. Kentucky Derby – Super Saver
  2. Preakness Stakes – Lookin at Lucky
  3. Belmont Stakes – Drosselmeyer
- Breeders' Cup World Thoroughbred Championships at Churchill Downs, Louisville, Kentucky (both days arranged in race card order):
  - Day 1:
    1. Breeders' Cup Marathon – Eldaafer
    2. Breeders' Cup Juvenile Fillies Turf – More Than Real
    3. Breeders' Cup Filly & Mare Sprint – Dubai Majesty
    4. Breeders' Cup Juvenile Fillies – Awesome Feather
    5. Breeders' Cup Filly & Mare Turf – Shared Account
    6. Breeders' Cup Ladies' Classic – Unrivaled Belle
  - Day 2:
    1. Breeders' Cup Juvenile Turf – Pluck
    2. Breeders' Cup Sprint – Big Drama
    3. Breeders' Cup Turf Sprint – Chamberlain Bridge
    4. Breeders' Cup Juvenile – Uncle Mo
    5. Breeders' Cup Mile – Goldikova
    6. Breeders' Cup Dirt Mile – Dakota Phone
    7. Breeders' Cup Turf – Dangerous Midge
    8. Breeders' Cup Classic – Blame

Harness

- Prix d'Amérique – Oyonnax

== Ice hockey ==
- February 13–25: Canada wins gold, United States wins silver, and Finland wins bronze at the women's tournament of the 2010 Winter Olympics in Vancouver, British Columbia, Canada
- February 16–28: Canada wins gold, United States wins silver, and Finland wins bronze at the men's tournament of the 2010 Winter Olympics in Vancouver, British Columbia, Canada.
- May 7–23: Czech Republic wins gold, Russia wins silver, and Sweden wins bronze at the 2010 IIHF World Championship in Cologne, Mannheim and Gelsenkirchen, Germany.
- June 9: The Chicago Blackhawks defeat the Philadelphia Flyers 4–3 in overtime of game six of the 2010 Stanley Cup Finals series to win the Stanley Cup for the first time in 49 years.

== Lacrosse ==
- July 15–24 – 2010 World Lacrosse Championship, Manchester, England.

== Mixed martial arts ==
The following is a list of major noteworthy MMA events by month.

January

1/2 – UFC 108: Evans vs. Silva

1/10 – WEC 46: Varner vs. Henderson

1/11 – UFC Fight Night: Maynard vs. Diaz

1/30 – Strikeforce: Miami

February

2/6 – UFC 109: Relentless

2/21 – UFC 110: Nogueira vs. Velasquez

2/26 – ShoMMA 6: Kaufman vs. Hashi

March

3/6 – WEC 47: Bowles vs. Cruz

3/21 – UFC Live: Vera vs. Jones

3/22 – Dream 13

3/26 – ShoMMA 7: Johnson vs. Mahe

3/27 – UFC 111: St. Pierre vs. Hardy

3/31 – UFC Fight Night: Florian vs. Gomi

April

4/8 – Bellator XIII (Start of Bellator Season 2)

4/10 – UFC 112: Invincible

4/15 – Bellator XIV

4/17 – Strikeforce: Nashville

4/22 – Bellator XV

4/24 – WEC 48: Aldo vs. Faber

4/25 – ASTRA

4/29 – Bellator XVI

May

5/6 – Bellator XVII

5/8 – UFC 113: Machida vs. Shogun 2

5/13 – Bellator XVIII

5/15 – Strikeforce: Heavy Artillery

5/20 – Bellator XIX

5/21 – ShoMMA 8: Lindland vs. Casey

5/27 – Bellator XX

5/29 – UFC 114: Rampage vs. Evans

5/29 – Dream 14

June

6/10 – Bellator XXI

6/12 – UFC 115: Liddell vs. Franklin

6/16 – Strikeforce: Los Angeles

6/17 – Bellator XXII

6/19 – The Ultimate Fighter 11 Finale

6/20 – WEC 49: Varner vs. Shalorus

6/24 – Bellator XXIII (End of Bellator Season 2)

6/26 – Strikeforce: Fedor vs. Werdum

July

7/3 – UFC 116: Lesnar vs. Carwin

7/10 – Dream 15

7/10 – Impact FC 1 – The Uprising: Brisbane

7/18 – Impact FC 2 – The Uprising: Sydney

7/23 – ShoMMA 9: Rosario vs. Mahe

August

8/1 – UFC Live: Jones vs. Matyushenko

8/7 – UFC 117: Silva vs. Sonnen

8/12 – Bellator XXIV (Start of Bellator season 3)

8/13 – ShoMMA 10: Riggs vs. Taylor

8/18 – WEC 50: Cruz vs. Benavidez 2

8/19 – Bellator XXV

8/21 – Strikeforce: Houston

8/26 – Bellator XXVI

8/28 – UFC 118: Edgar vs. Penn 2

September

9/2 – Bellator XXVII

9/9 – Bellator XXVIII

9/11 – Shark Fights 13: Jardine vs. Prangley

9/15 – UFC Fight Night: Marquardt vs. Palhares

9/16 – Bellator XXIX

9/23 – Bellator XXX

9/25 – UFC 119: Mir vs. Cro Cop

9/25 – Dream 16

9/30 – Bellator XXXI

9/30 – WEC 51: Aldo vs. Gamburyan

October

10/9 – Strikeforce: Diaz vs. Noons II

10/14 – Bellator XXXII

10/16 – UFC 120: Bisping vs. Akiyama

10/21 – Bellator XXXIII

10/22 – ShoMMA 11: Bowling vs. Voelker

10/23 – UFC 121: Lesnar vs. Velasquez

10/28 – Bellator XXXIV (End of Bellator season 3)

November

11/9 – Israel FC: Genesis

11/11 – WEC 52: Faber vs. Mizugaki

11/13 – UFC 122: Marquardt vs. Okami

11/19 – ShoMMA 12: Wilcox vs. Ribeiro

11/20 – UFC 123: Rampage vs. Machida

December

12/4 – The Ultimate Fighter 12 Finale aka The Ultimate Fighter: Team GSP vs. Team Koscheck Finale

12/4 – Strikeforce: St. Louis aka Strikeforce: Henderson vs. Babalu II

12/11 – UFC 124: St-Pierre vs. Koscheck 2

12/16 – WEC 53: Henderson vs. Pettis (Last WEC event)

12/31 – Dynamite!! 2010

== Multi-sport events ==
- January 25 – January 31 – 2010 World Winter Masters Games, Bled, Slovenia
- January 29 – February 8 – 2010 South Asian Games, Dhaka, Bangladesh
- February 12 – 28 – 2010 Winter Olympics, Vancouver, British Columbia, Canada
- March 6 – 13 – 2010 Arctic Winter Games in Grande Prairie, Alberta, Canada
- March 12 – 21 – 2010 Winter Paralympics, Vancouver, British Columbia, Canada
- March 19 – 30 – 2010 South American Games, in Medellín, Colombia
- July 17 – August 1 – 2010 Central American and Caribbean Games, Mayagüez, Puerto Rico
- July 31 to August 6, 2010 - 2010 Gay Games, Cologne, Germany
- August 14 – 26 – 2010 Summer Youth Olympics, Singapore, Singapore
- October 3 – 14 – 2010 Commonwealth Games, Delhi, India
- November 12 – 27 – 2010 Asian Games, Guangzhou, China
- December 12 – 19 – 2010 Asian Para Games, Guangzhou, China

== Netball ==
International tournaments

Date	Tournament	Winners	Runners up
3–5 June	2010 Pacific Netball Series	Fiji	Cook Islands
23–27 July	2010 AFNA World Netball Championship qualifiers	Trinidad and Tobago	Barbados
7–21 August	2010 Taini Jamison Trophy Series	New Zealand	Jamaica
29 Aug–5 Sept	2010 Constellation Cup	Australia	New Zealand
3–14 October	2010 Commonwealth Games	New Zealand	Australia
19–21 November	2010 World Netball Series	New Zealand	England

Major leagues

Host	League	Winners	Runners up
Australia/New Zealand	ANZ Championship	Adelaide Thunderbirds	Waikato Bay of Plenty Magic
United Kingdom	Netball Superleague	Team Bath	Hertfordshire Mavericks

== Pickleball ==
- The International Federation of Pickleball, now the International Pickleball Federation, was founded in Goodyear, Arizona by the USA Pickleball Association, now USA Pickleball.

== Rink hockey ==
- January 9 – January 15: 2010 Asian Roller Hockey Championship, Dalian, China
- July: 2010 Rink Hockey European Championship, Wuppertal, Germany
- September 25 – October 2: 2010 Rink Hockey Ladies World Championship, Alcobendas, Spain
- September 23 – October 30: 2010 Rink Hockey Men's B World Championship, Dornbirn, Austria
- 2010 Rink Hockey American Championship, Catalonia

== Rowing ==
- October 29 – November 7 – 2010 World Rowing Championships will be held at Lake Karapiro, Hamilton, New Zealand.

== Rugby league ==
- January 29 – October 2 – Super League XV was held in England, Wales and France. Wigan Warriors defeated St. Helens 22–10 in the Grand Final for their second title. This was also St Helens' fourth consecutive Grand Final defeat.
- February 13– 2010 All Stars match is played on the Gold Coast, Australia.
- February 28– 2010 World Club Challenge is played in Leeds, England, with Australia's Melbourne Storm beating England's Leeds Rhinos.
- March 12 – October 3 – 2010 NRL season was held in Australia and New Zealand. The St. George Illawarra Dragons defeated Sydney Roosters 32–8 in the Grand Final for their first premiership since the 1999 merger that created the team.
- April 22 – The Melbourne Storm Storm are stripped of their 2007 and 2009 premierships and 2006–2008 minor premierships, fined $1.689 million, deducted all eight premiership points for the 2010 season and barred from receiving premiership points for the rest of the season by the National Rugby League after being found guilty of long-term gross salary cap breaches.
- October–November – 2010 Rugby League Four Nations will be held in Australia and New Zealand.
- October–November – 2010 European Cup will be held in Europe where Ireland, Scotland, Wales and France will compete for a spot in the 2011 four nations.

== Rugby union ==
- 116th Six Nations Championship series is won by France who complete the Grand Slam.
- March 8 – The Celtic League and Italian Rugby Federation confirm the entry of two Italian teams, Aironi and Benetton Treviso, into the previously Celtic competition in 2010–11.
- May 18–30 – The 2010 IRB Junior World Rugby Trophy was held at several sites in Moscow, Russia and won by Italy.
- May 22 – Toulouse win their fourth Heineken Cup, defeating fellow French side Biarritz 21–19 in the Heineken Cup Final at Stade de France in Saint-Denis.
- May 23 – Cardiff Blues win the Amlin Challenge Cup Final at Stade Vélodrome in Marseille 28–21 over nearby French club Toulon.
- May 29 – The last Super 14 Final before the competition expands to 15 teams is won by the Bulls, who defeat fellow South African side Stormers 25–17 at Orlando Stadium in Soweto.
- May 30 – Samoa win the Edinburgh Sevens and secure their first IRB Sevens World Series season crown.
- May 30, – June 26, – The 2010 Summer Tours start.
- June 5–21 – The 2010 IRB Junior World Championship was held at three sites in Argentina and won by New Zealand.
- August 20, – September 5, – 2010 Women's Rugby World Cup was held at two sites in London, England and won by New Zealand.
- October 23, – December 18, – The 2010 end-of-year series takes place. Notable events during this series include:
  - November 13: Victor Matfield earned his 103rd cap to become South Africa's most-capped player ever.
  - November 20: Richie McCaw and Mils Muliaina earned their 93rd caps, becoming New Zealand's most-capped players.
  - November 27: The 2011 Rugby World Cup qualification process concluded in Bucharest with Romania defeating Uruguay 39–12. Romania won the two-legged tie 60–33 on aggregate to claim the final spot in the 2011 Rugby World Cup.
  - November 27: Dan Carter of New Zealand surpassed Jonny Wilkinson of England as the leading career point scorer in Test rugby.

Domestic competitions

- (England) Guinness Premiership – Leicester Tigers
- (France) Top 14 – Clermont win their first title in their nearly 100-year history after having lost in 10 previous championship finals.
- (Ireland) (Scotland) (Wales) Celtic League – Ospreys
- (England) (Wales) LV= Cup (Anglo-Welsh Cup) – Northampton Saints
- ITM Cup (formerly Air New Zealand Cup) – Canterbury
- (South Africa) Currie Cup – Sharks

== Ski mountaineering ==
- March 1 – March 6 – 2010 World Championship of Ski Mountaineering in Gran Valira (Pyrenees), Andorra

== Tennis ==
- Australian Open
  - Men's final: Roger Federer defeats Andy Murray, 6–3, 6–4, 7–6(11)
  - Women's final: Serena Williams defeats Justine Henin, 6–4, 3–6, 6–2
- French Open
  - Men's final: Rafael Nadal defeats Robin Söderling, 6–4, 6–2, 6–4
  - Women's final: Francesca Schiavone defeats Samantha Stosur, 6–4, 7–6(2)
  - Francesca Schiavone becomes the first Italian, male or female, to win a Grand Slam singles title.
- Wimbledon Championships
  - Men's final: Rafael Nadal defeats Tomáš Berdych, 6–3, 7–5, 6–4
  - Women's final: Serena Williams defeats Vera Zvonareva, 6–3, 6–2
  - The first round of the Gentlemen's Singles features the longest match in tennis history. In a match that lasted 11 hours, 5 minutes over three days, American John Isner defeats France's Nicolas Mahut 6–4, 3–6, 6–7(7), 7–6(3), 70–68. The final set alone was longer in both games and time than the previous longest match.
- U.S. Open
  - Men's final: Rafael Nadal defeats Novak Djokovic, 6–4, 5–7, 6–4, 6–2
  - Women's final: Kim Clijsters defeats Vera Zvonareva, 6–2, 6–1
- Davis Cup
  - Serbia defeats France, 3–2
- Fed Cup
  - Italy defeats United States, 3–1

== Volleyball ==
- Women's CEV Champions League 2009–10 December 1, 2009 – April 4, 2010. Final Four in Cannes, France
  - Champions (Italy) Volley Bergamo, (Turkey) Fenerbahçe Acıbadem, (France) RC Cannes. MVP: Francesca Piccinini (ITA)
- Men's CEV Champions League 2009–10 December 1, 2009 – May 2, 2010. Final Four in Łódź, Poland.
  - Champions (Italy) Trentino BetClic, (Russia) Dynamo Moscow, (Poland) PGE Skra Bełchatów. MVP: Osmany Juantorena (CUB)
- 2010 Liga de Voleibol Superior Femenino February 12 – May 12, in Puerto Rico
  - Champions Pinkin de Corozal, Season MVP: Oneida González (VEN), Final Series MVP: Destinee Hooker (USA)
- 2010 Men's Pan-American Volleyball Cup, May 20–31, in Puerto Rico
  - (gold) United States, (silver) Argentina and (bronze) Puerto Rico. MVP: Jayson Jablonsky (USA)
- 2010 Montreux Volley Masters, June 8–13, in Montreux, Switzerland
  - (gold) China, (silver) United States and (bronze) Cuba. MVP: Kenia Carcaces (CUB)
- 2010 Women's European Volleyball League, June 5 – July 25, Final Four in Ankara, Turkey
  - (gold) Serbia, (silver) Bulgaria and (bronze) Turkey. MVP: Jelena Nikolić (SRB)
- 2010 Men's European Volleyball League, June 4 – July 17, Final Four in Guadalajara, Spain
  - (gold) Portugal, (silver) Spain and (bronze) Turkey. MVP: Valdir Sequeira (POR)
- FIVB World League 2010, June 11 – July 25, 2010, in Córdoba, Argentina
  - (gold) Brazil, (silver) Russia and (bronze) Serbia. MVP: Murilo Endres (BRA)
- 2010 Women's Pan-American Volleyball Cup, June 16–27, in Rosarito and Tijuana, Mexico
  - (gold) Dominican Republic, (silver) Peru and (bronze) United States. MVP: Prisilla Rivera (DOM)
- Men's Volleyball at the 2010 Central American and Caribbean Games, July 24–29, in Mayagüez, Puerto Rico
  - (gold) Puerto Rico, (silver) Venezuela and (bronze) Mexico. MVP: Héctor Soto (PUR)
- Women's Volleyball at the 2010 Central American and Caribbean Games, July 18–23, in Mayagüez, Puerto Rico
  - (gold) Dominican Republic, (silver) Puerto Rico and (bronze) Costa Rica. MVP: Deborah Seilhamer (PUR)
- FIVB World Grand Prix 2010 August 6–29, Final Round in Ningbo, China
  - (gold) United States, (silver) Brazil and (bronze) Italy. MVP: Foluke Akinradewo (USA)
- 2010 Final Four Women's Volleyball Cup, September 19–26, Chiapas, Mexico
  - (gold) Dominican Republic, (silver) Peru and (bronze) Argentina. MVP: Dahiana Burgos (DOM)
- 2010 FIVB Men's World Championship, September 24, 2010 to October 10, 2010
  - (gold) Brazil, (silver) Cuba and (bronze) Serbia. MVP: Murilo Endres (BRA)
- 2010 FIVB Women's World Championship October 29, 2010 to November 14, 2010
  - (gold) Russia, (silver) Brazil and (bronze) Japan. MVP: Yekaterina Gamova (RUS)
- Men's Volleyball at the 2010 Asian Games, November 18–27 in Guangzhou, Guangdong, China
  - (gold) Japan, (silver) Iran and (bronze) South Korea.
- Women's Volleyball at the 2010 Asian Games, November 13–27 in Guangzhou, Guangdong, China
  - (gold) China, (silver) South Korea and (bronze) Kazakhstan.
- 2010 FIVB Men's Club World Championship December 15–21, 2010 in Doha, Qatar.
  - Champions (Italy) Trentino BetClic, (Poland) PGE Skra Bełchatów, (Iran) Paykan Tehran, MVP: Osmany Juantorena (CUB)
- 2010 FIVB Women's Club World Championship December 15–21, 2010 in Doha, Qatar.
  - Champions (Turkey) Fenerbahçe Acıbadem, (Brazil) Sollys Osasco, (Italy) Bergamo, MVP: Katarzyna Skowrońska (POL)
