= 2011 Breeders' Cup Classic =

Thoroughbred horse race

28th Breeders' Cup Classic
- Breeders' Cup Classic
- Location: Churchill Downs
- Date: November 5, 2011
- Winning horse: Drosselmeyer
- Jockey: Mike E. Smith
- Trainer: William I. Mott
- Owner: WinStar Farm
- Conditions: fast
- Surface: Dirt
- Attendance: 65,143

The 2011 Breeders' Cup Classic was the 28th running of the Breeders' Cup Classic, part of the 2011 Breeders' Cup World Thoroughbred Championships program. It was run on November 5, 2011, at Churchill Downs in Louisville, Kentucky with a purse of $5,000,000.

Drosselmeyer, a 15-1 longshot who was in tenth place with a quarter mile left in the race, closed rapidly and won by a length and a half over another longshot, Game On Dude. With none of the favorites finishing in the top three, the superfecta paid $41,631.80.

The Classic is run on dirt at one mile and one-quarter (approximately 2000 m). It is run under weight-for-age conditions, with entrants carrying the following weights:

- Northern Hemisphere three-year-olds: 122 pounds (55 kg)
- Southern Hemisphere three-year-olds: 117 pounds (53 kg)
- Four-year-olds and up: 126 pounds (57 kg)
- Any fillies or mares receive a 3 pounds (1.4 kg) allowance

== Contenders ==
The field for the Classic lacked in star power, especially when compared to the 2010 running featuring Zenyatta and Blame. However, the field was very deep with most of the entries given a legitimate chance of winning. The leading contenders included:

- Uncle Mo, who was the previous year's two-year-old champion but missed the Kentucky Derby due to illness. Recovered to win the Kelso Handicap in October and was the morning line favorite but had never raced at 1 1/4 miles
- Flat Out, who was the lukewarm post-time favorite for the race after winning the Jockey Club Gold Cup
- Havre de Grace, a highly regarded filly who had defeated Flat Out in the Woodward Stakes but had never won at 1 1/4 miles
- So You Think, a New Zealand-bred five-year-old with three European Group I wins in 2011 in but who had never raced on the dirt
- Game On Dude, winner of the Santa Anita Handicap and Goodwood Stakes. Ridden by Chantal Sutherland, who hoped to become the first woman jockey to win the Classic
- Stay Thirsty, winner of the Travers Stakes
- Drosselmeyer, winner of the 2010 Belmont Stakes and runner-up in the Jockey Club Gold Cup

== Race Description ==
Game On Dude went to the lead but was challenged by Uncle Mo. The two set moderate early fractions, followed closely by a large pack of challengers. Turning into the stretch, Uncle Mo hit the lead but then faded, eventually finishing tenth. Game On Dude then repelled challenges from To Honor and Serve and So You Think, opening up a one length lead in mid-stretch. Meanwhile, Drosselmeyer had raced near the back of the field, over ten lengths behind the leaders. He started to make up ground around the far turn but was still in tenth place with a quarter of a mile remaining. Swinging wide, he put in a burst of speed and swept past Game On Dude in the final strides, winning by a length and a half.

One of the biggest stories after the race centered on the fact that Drosselmeyer's jockey Mike Smith had once been engaged to Sutherland on Game On Dude. Sutherland had thought she would win, only to see Smith move past her near the finish line. "I'm very proud of my horse, very proud of myself. I had an amazing time," she said after the race. "And I'm happy for Mike. But really? Really? Of all people."

For Smith, it was a "redemption" of sorts after the defeat of Zenyatta the year before. "Compared to last year, this is incredible. Last year still hurts like nothing ever before in my life," he said. "The key to this horse is you gotta' keep him moving, gotta' keep pedaling. He can run all day." It was Smith's fifteenth Breeders' Cup win, tying him for the all-time lead with Jerry Bailey.

Drosselmeyer's trainer, Bill Mott, had previously won the Classic with Cigar in 1995. He also won the Ladies' Classic with Royal Delta on the Friday card.

== Results ==
Finish	Program Number	Margin (lengths)	Horse	Jockey	Trainer	Final Odds	Winnings
1st	3	1 1/2 lengths	Drosselmeyer	Mike Smith	Bill Mott	14.80	2,700,000
2nd	8	1 length	Game On Dude	Chantal Sutherland	Bob Baffert	14.20	900,000
3rd	4	1/2	Ruler On Ice	Garrett Gomez	Kelly Breen	17.20	495,000
4th	10	Head	Havre de Grace	Ramon Dominguez	J. Larry Jones	4.10	300,000
5th	2	Neck	Flat Out	Alex Solis	Charles Dickey	3.60	150,000
6th	5	Neck	So You Think (NZ)	Ryan Moore	Aidan O'Brien	5.30	
7th	13	1/2	To Honor and Serve	Jose Lezcano	William Mott	9.90	
8th	6	1 1/4	Ice Box	Corey Nakatani	Nicholas Zito	30.60	
9th	7	1 1/2	Rattlesnake Bridge	Calvin Borel	Kiaran McLaughlin	21.10	
10th	12	Nose	Uncle Mo	John Velazquez	Todd Pletcher	5.40	
11th	9	3/4	Stay Thirsty	Javier Castellano	Todd Pletcher	11.80	
12th	11		Headache	Paco Lopez	Michael Maker	24.90	

Source: Equibase

Times: 1/4 – 0:23.61; 1/2 – 0:47.84; 3/4 – 1:12.82; mile – 1:38.27; final – 2:04.27.
Fractional Splits: (:23.61) (:24.23) (:24.98) (:25.45) (:26.00)

== Payout ==
Payout Schedule:

Program Number	Horse	Win	Place	Show
3	Drosselmeyer	31.60	13.20	8.30
8	Game On Dude		13.60	9.20
4	Ruler On Ice			9.80

- $2 Exacta (3–8) Paid $444.80
- $2 Trifecta (3–8–4) Paid $5,427.40
- $2 Superfecta (3–8–4–10) Paid $47,631.80
