= Noble's Promise =

American-bred Thoroughbred racehorse

- Sire: Cuvee
- Grandsire: Carson City
- Dam: The Devil's Trick
- Damsire: Clever Trick
- Sex: Colt
- Foaled: 2007
- Country: United States
- Colour: Bay
- Breeder: Charles & Ben Kidder, Nancy Cole
- Owner: Chasing Dreams Racing
- Trainer: Kenneth G. McPeek
- Record: 27: 6-7-3
- Earnings: US$ $1,193,376

Major wins
- Breeders' Futurity Stakes (2009); Aristides Breeders' Cup Stakes (2011)
- Last updated on November 22, 2018

Noble's Promise (April 13, 2007 – August 6, 2018) was an American Thoroughbred racehorse best known for winning the 2009 Breeders' Futurity Stakes.

== Background ==
Foaled in Kentucky, Noble's Promise was a bay horse with two white socks and a blaze. He was bred by Charles Kidder (D.V.M.) and his son Ben in a partnership with Dr. Nancy Cole (D.V.M.). He was sired by then-Gainesway Farm stallion Cuvee, who was a three-time graded stakes winner at age 2. Cuvee was sired by Carson City, a son of Mr. Prospector. He is out of the Clever Trick mare The Devil's Trick.

Noble's Promise was purchased by Chasing Dreams Racing partners Keith Myrick and Tom Childress as a weanling for $10,000 at the 2007 yearling Keeneland Sales.

Richard and Tammy Rigney purchased and raced the colt as part of the Chasing Dreams Racing 2008 partnership, under which he won some of his biggest races.

== Racing career ==
=== 2009: 2-Year-Old Season ===
As a juvenile, Noble's Promise broke his maiden in his second start, and then won the listed Fitz Dixon Jr. Memorial Stakes at Presque Isle Downs. Noble's Promise won the Grade 1 Breeders' Futurity Stakes as an upset at 12–1, clocking a final time of 1:43.12. In the race, he defeated Aikenite, Make Music For Me, and Stately Victor. This win gave him an automatic berth in the $2 million 2009 Breeders' Cup Juvenile at Santa Anita Park in Arcadia, California. The 2009 Juvenile was won in an upset by Vale of York, with Lookin At Lucky a close second. Noble's Promise finished a good third after taking the lead around the far turn.

Noble's Promise remained in California after the race and was entered in the $750,000 CashCall Futurity at Hollywood Park Racetrack, where he finished second to Lookin at Lucky.

=== 2010: 3-Year-Old Season ===
Noble's Promise made his three-year-old debut at Oaklawn Park in the Rebel Stakes, a prep race that was won by Smarty Jones and Afleet Alex during their Kentucky Derby prep campaigns. He again finished second to Lookin at Lucky in the race. He followed the Rebel Stakes with a run in the Arkansas Derby, finishing a troubled fifth.

Noble's Promise was entered to run in the 2010 Kentucky Derby. A morning-line longshot at 12–1, Noble's Promise finished a good fifth on a sloppy track. Ahead of him were Make Music For Me, Paddy O'Prado, Ice Box, and the winner Super Saver.

After the Kentucky Derby, Noble's Promise's career took a rather unorthodox turn, as his connections chose to bypass the Preakness Stakes and send him to England to run in the prestigious St James's Palace Stakes at Royal Ascot. Noble's Promise finished fifth for the third time in a row, but did not disgrace himself, as he finished both three lengths behind winner Canford Cliffs and ahead of Makfi. After his trip to Royal Ascot, Noble's Promise returned to the United States and took time off.

Noble's Promises's first race after Royal Ascot was the listed Johnny V. "Don't Give Up...Don't Ever Give Up!" Stakes at Churchill Downs in November, which he won. His final race of 2010 was the Malibu Stakes, where he finished fifth again.

=== 2011: 4-Year-Old Season ===
Noble's Promise became a millionaire in the 2011 Aristides Breeders' Cup Stakes, beating a field of graded stakes winners, including Capt. Candyman Can, Atta Boy Roy, and the 2010 winner, Riley Tucker. The race was his first for the season. Afterwards, he contested the Phoenix Stakes, finishing second, the Smile Sprint Stakes, finishing third, and then the Alfred G. Vanderbilt Handicap, finishing fifth. In his final race of 2011, Noble's Promise contested the Presque Isle Mile Stakes and finished seventh.

Noble's Promise was sold in the 2011 Fasig-Tipton November Sale, where Richard Rigney, a member of the original partnership that owned Noble's Promise, bought him for $125,000. he then raced him under the banner of JCM Racing.

=== 2012: 5-Year-Old Season ===
His first two races of 2012 were allowance races at Gulfstream Park and Keeneland Race Course, where he finished seventh and third, respectively. He ran in the Cannon Shell Stakes at Belmont Park, and then in the Aristides Stakes at Churchill Downs to defend his title. He finished fifth in both races. He ran second in both the Kelly's Landing Stakes and Don Bernhardt Stakes, both blacktype, and then the Kentucky Downs Turf Dash Stakes at Kentucky Downs. For his final stakes appearance, he again finished second in the Phoenix Stakes. Noble's Promise won for the final time in an allowance at Keeneland. In his final career start, he finished second in another Keeneland allowance.

Noble's Promise retired with a record of 27: 6-7-3 and earnings of $1,193,376.

== Stud career ==
Noble's Promise retired to Breakway Farm in Dillsboro, Indiana for the 2013 breeding season. He was the first stallion venture for Richard and Tammy Rigney.

Noble's Promise sired his first winner when Reverend John won a maiden race for Indiana-bred horses at Indiana Grand on October 12, 2016.

To date, Noble's Promise's best runners are stakes winners Fireball baby, Snickle Cookie, and Reverend John, and stakes-placed Blue Hen Hockey and Entrusted.

== Death ==
Noble's Promise was euthanized on August 6, 2018, due to complications from kidney failure. He was 11 years old.

== Racing career ==
Date	Race	Track	Location	Distance	Surface	Condition	Finish
April 23, 2009	Maiden Special Weight	Keeneland	Lexington, Kentucky	4 1/2 F	All Weather	Fast	2nd
September 5, 2009	Maiden Special Weight	Ellis Park Racecourse	Henderson, Kentucky	5 1/2 F	Turf	Firm	1st
September 26, 2009	Fitz Dixon Stakes	Presque Isle Downs	Erie, Pennsylvania	6 1/2 F	All Weather	Fast	1st
October 10, 2009	Breeders' Futurity	Keeneland	Lexington, Kentucky	1 1/16 M	All Weather	Fast	1st
November 7, 2009	Breeders' Cup Juvenile	Santa Anita Park	Arcadia, California	1 1/16 M	All Weather	Fast	3rd
December 19, 2009	CashCall Futurity	Hollywood Park	Inglewood, California	1 1/16 M	All Weather	Fast	2nd
June 4, 2011	Aristides Breeders' Cup Stakes	Churchill Downs	Louisville, Kentucky	6 furlongs	Dirt	Fast	1st
