= First Dude =

First Dude may refer to:

- First Dude (horse), an American Thoroughbred racehorse
- First Gentleman, the unofficial title used in some countries for the spouse of an elected head of state
- Todd Palin (born 1964), the husband of former Alaska Governor Sarah Palin
