= Drosselmeyer =

American-bred Thoroughbred racehorse

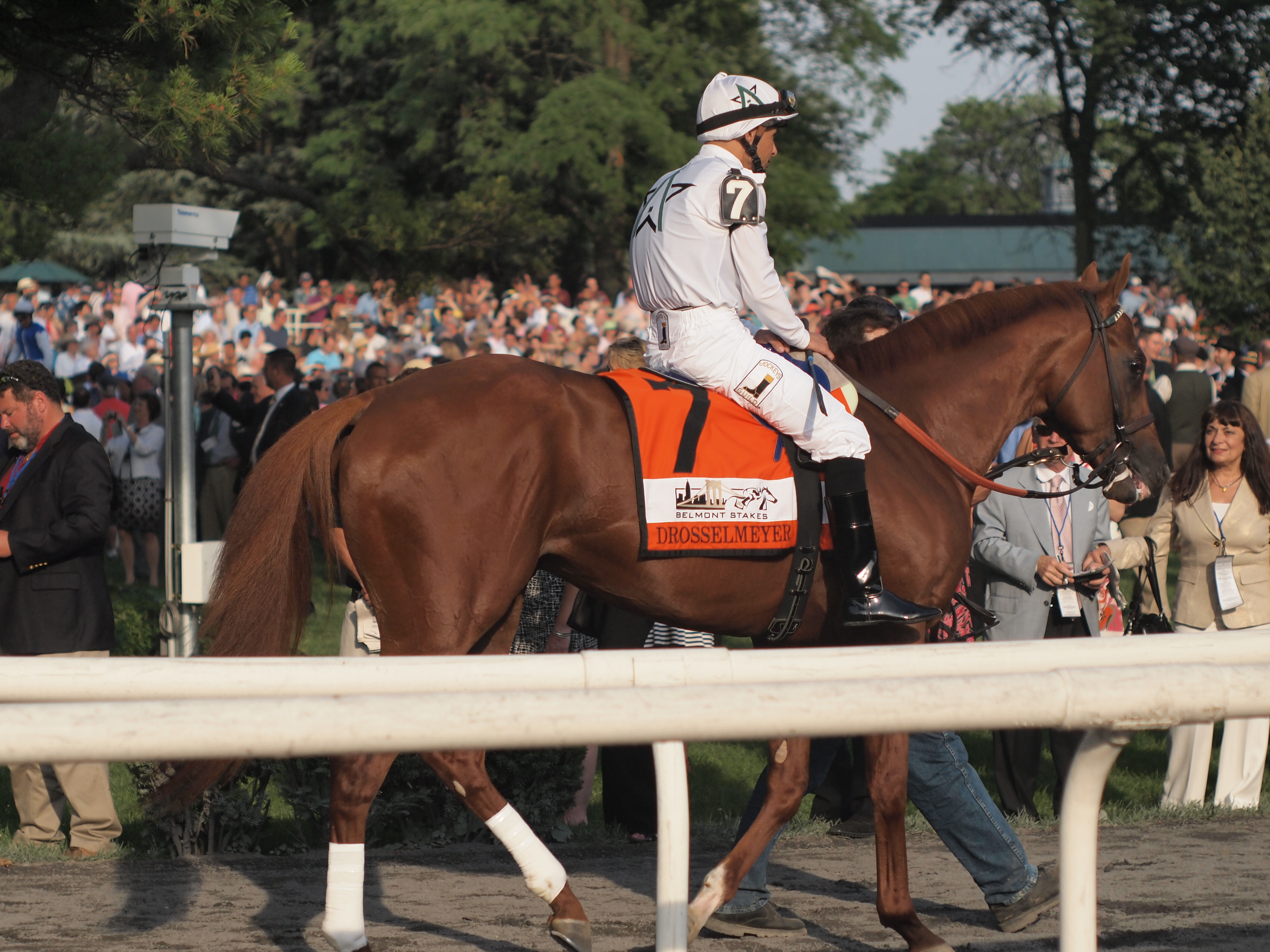
- Drosselmeyer at the 2010 Belmont Stakes
- Sire: Distorted Humor
- Grandsire: Forty Niner
- Dam: Golden Ballet
- Damsire: Moscow Ballet
- Sex: Stallion
- Foaled: April 1, 2007
- Country: United States
- Colour: Chestnut
- Breeder: Aaron & Marie Jones
- Owner: WinStar Farm LLC
- Trainer: William I. Mott
- Record: 16: 5-5-2
- Earnings: US$3,728,170

Major wins
- Triple Crown / Breeders' Cup wins: Belmont Stakes (2010); Breeders' Cup Classic (2011)

Honours
- NTRA "Moment of the Year" (2011)

Drosselmeyer (foaled April 1, 2007, in Kentucky) is an American Thoroughbred racehorse best known for winning the 2010 Belmont Stakes and the 2011 Breeders' Cup Classic.

== Background ==
Drosselmeyer was sired by multiple stakes winner Distorted Humor, most famous as the sire of dual Classic winner Funny Cide. His dam was Golden Ballet, a multiple Grade 1 winner. Distorted Humor was known for his speed, while Golden Ballet's pedigree was more stamina oriented. Her sire Moscow Ballet was a son of 1971 English Triple Crown champion Nijinsky and her dam was by multiple grade I winner Slew o' Gold by Seattle Slew. Further back in her pedigree are four crosses to the outstanding broodmare La Troienne.

Drosselmeyer was purchased at the 2008 Keeneland September Yearling Sale for $600,000 by WinStar Farm LLC of Versailles, Kentucky, who entrusted his race conditioning to Hall of Fame trainer Bill Mott. The colt was named for a character from The Nutcracker ballet.

== Racing career ==
Drosselmeyer raced four times at age two, earning his first win in a maiden special weight race at Churchill Downs on November 18 in his final start of 2009.

To start his three-year-old campaign, Drosselmeyer won an allowance race at Gulfstream Park on January 31. He then finished fourth in his first graded stakes appearance, the Risen Star Stakes, held on February 20 at Fair Grounds Race Course. In an attempt to qualify for the 2010 Kentucky Derby, he next entered the Louisiana Derby, finishing third. However, his earnings from the two stakes races were not sufficient to qualify for the Derby. Instead, Drosselmeyer next raced in the Dwyer Stakes, on May 8, finishing a well beaten second behind the winner Fly Down.

After the Dwyer, Drosselmeyer trained well despite experiencing soreness in the frogs of his hooves. Mott soaked the colt's legs in hot water and Epsom salts twice a day, and also had the horse reshod. "It looked like [the frogs] were becoming a bit of a problem, so we put on a simple aluminum bar shoe to give him a little protection," Mott said. "I think we could have run into some trouble had we not done it. As a trainer, that's a gratifying part of it."

In the 2010 Belmont Stakes held on June 5, Drosselmeyer and his new jockey Mike Smith went off at odds of 13-1. With the winners of the Kentucky Derby and Preakness Stakes both missing the Belmont, the favorites became the runners-up in those races, Ice Box and First Dude. Fly Down was also highly regarded given his performance in the Dwyer. First Dude went to the early lead, while jockey Mike Smith kept Drosselmeyer a few lengths behind on the outside of the pack. Drosselmeyer started his drive around the far turn and moved to the lead in mid-stretch, then held off a closing rush from Fly Down. Elliott Walden, the racing manager of WinStar Farm, credited Smith for the change in tactics that allowed Drosselmeyer to make a sustained drive. "We went to Mike because we felt he would get him in a rhythm and keep him running," said Walden. This horse really kicked hard turning for home and finished strong." It was Smith's first win in the Belmont and Mott's first ever Triple Crown race win.

Drosselmeyer was in training for the Jim Dandy Stakes when he came back walking stiffly after a workout on July 4. He missed the rest of his three-year-old season.

Drosselmeyer finally returned to racing on March 5, 2011 when he finished fourth in the Challenge Stakes at Gulfstream Park. He followed up with a fifth place finish in the Skip Away Stakes on April 3, then won the 2011 One Count Stakes on May 15 by a neck over Birdrun. Birdrun then turned the tables by winning the Brooklyn Handicap on June 10. Mott next decided to try Drosselmeyer on the turf in the Sword Dancer Invitational on August 13. Ridden by Jose Lezcano, Drosselmeyer ran uncharacteristically close to the pace but tired in the stretch to finish seventh.

In the Jockey Club Gold Cup on October 1, Drosselmeyer rebounded with a second place finish behind Flat Out over a muddy track at Belmont Park. He had rallied from fifth with a sustained run, encouraging Mott that the horse was back in form.

On November 5, Drosselmeyer entered the $5 million Breeders' Cup Classic at Churchill Downs as a 13-1 longshot. The field was considered very evenly balanced, featuring Flat Out (Jockey Club Gold Cup), Havre de Grace (Woodward Stakes), Stay Thirsty (Travers), Game On Dude (Santa Anita Handicap and Goodwood Stakes), So You Think (three European Group One wins) and Uncle Mo (Kelso Handicap). Reunited with Mike Smith, Drosselmeyer settled near the back of the field, then made a sustained run down the center of the track to pass Game On Dude in the final strides of the race. "He ran a super race," said Mott. "He was mowing them down the last eighth of a mile. I guess his biggest attribute is his stamina, and he showed it today. When they were wearing down, he was coming. It’s great." The race was named the NTRA Moment of the Year.

== Retirement ==
Drosselmeyer was retired to stud in 2012 at WinStar Farm, in Versailles, Kentucky, for a fee of $17,500 per live foal. He also shuttled to Brazil for the southern hemisphere breeding season. In October 2015, he was sold to Stud TNT and will remain in Brazil.

== Pedigree ==
Pedigree of Drosselmeyer, chestnut horse, foaled April 1, 2007
Sire Distorted Humor	Forty Niner	Mr. Prospector	Raise a Native
Sire Distorted Humor	Forty Niner	Mr. Prospector	Gold Digger
Sire Distorted Humor	Forty Niner	File	Tom Rolfe
Sire Distorted Humor	Forty Niner	File	Continue
Sire Distorted Humor	Danzig's Beauty	Danzig	Northern Dancer
Sire Distorted Humor	Danzig's Beauty	Danzig	Pas De Nom
Sire Distorted Humor	Danzig's Beauty	Sweetest Chant	Mr. Leader
Sire Distorted Humor	Danzig's Beauty	Sweetest Chant	Gay Sonnet
Dam Golden Ballet	Moscow Ballet	Nijinsky	Northern Dancer
Dam Golden Ballet	Moscow Ballet	Nijinsky	Flaming Page
Dam Golden Ballet	Moscow Ballet	Millicent	Cornish Prince
Dam Golden Ballet	Moscow Ballet	Millicent	Milan Mill
Dam Golden Ballet	Golden Jewel Box	Slew o' Gold	Seattle Slew
Dam Golden Ballet	Golden Jewel Box	Slew o' Gold	Alluvial
Dam Golden Ballet	Golden Jewel Box	Miss Storm Bird	Storm Bird
Dam Golden Ballet	Golden Jewel Box	Miss Storm Bird	Sun Lover (Family 10-d)

Drosselmeyer is inbred 4 × 4 × 5 to Northern Dancer, meaning Northern Dancer appears twice in the fourth generation of his pedigree and once in the fifth generation.
