= First Dude (horse) =

American-bred Thoroughbred racehorse (2007–2026)

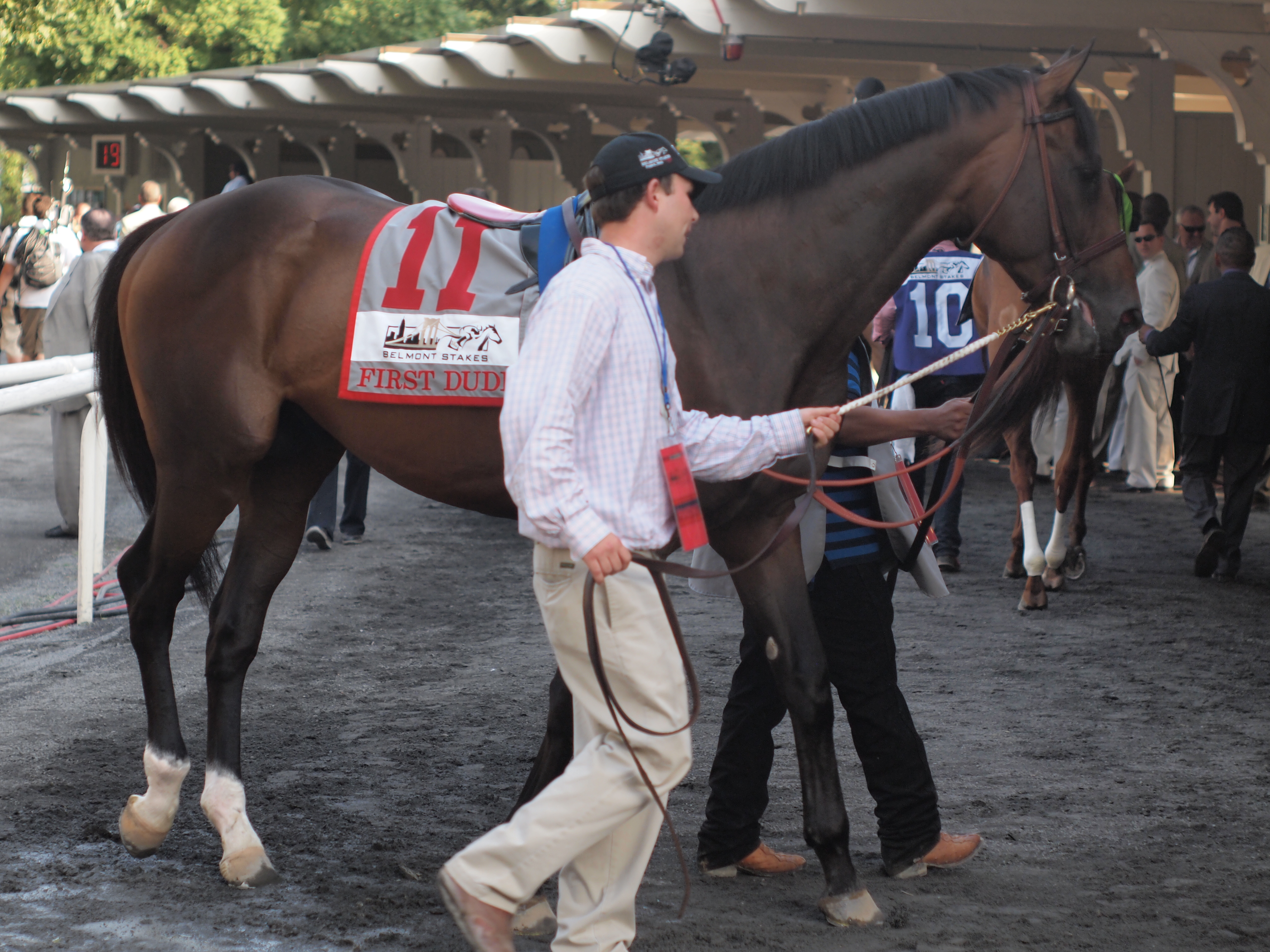
- First Dude at 2010 Belmont Stakes
- Sire: Stephen Got Even
- Grandsire: A.P. Indy
- Dam: Run Sarah Run
- Damsire: Smart Strike
- Sex: Stallion
- Foaled: March 27, 2007; Florida, U.S.
- Died: September 23, 2026 (aged 19); Ocala, Florida, U.S.
- Country: United States
- Colour: Bay
- Breeder: Donald R. Dizney
- Owner: Double Diamond Farm
- Trainer: Dale Romans; Bob Baffert
- Record: 17: 4-5-4
- Earnings: $1,442,140

Major wins
- Hollywood Gold Cup (2011); Alysheba Stakes (2011); American Classic Race placing: Preakness Stakes 2nd (2010); Belmont Stakes 3rd (2010)
- Last updated on May 22, 2011

First Dude (March 27, 2007 – September 23, 2026) was an American Thoroughbred racehorse. He was sired by Stephen Got Even, who in turn was a son of leading sire A.P. Indy. First Dude is out of the mare Run Sarah Run, who is the daughter of Smart Strike. The name refers to the nickname of former First Gentleman of Alaska Todd Palin.

== Racing & stud career ==
=== 2009: two-year-old season ===
He started his career with Ramon Dominguez as his jockey, and he finished in 2nd place at Keeneland. In his second race, he also finished in second place and thus, failed to break maiden in his first two starts.

=== 2010: three-year-old season ===
In his third career start, he broke his maiden on January 30, 2010, at Gulfstream Park in a one-mile maiden special weight race, finishing in 1:37 flat with a 77 Beyer speed figure. After that, First Dude placed or showed in seven graded stakes events (6 Grade 1 and one Grade 2 race) during the remainder of 2010.

In April, he finished third in the Grade 1 one-and-one-eighth mile Blue Grass Stakes behind Kentucky Derby starters Stately Victor and Paddy O'Prado (also a stablemate trained by Romans) on the synthetic surface at Keeneland Race Course.

On the third Saturday of May, First Dude ran in the Grade 1 Preakness Stakes at 1 mile and 3/16 at Pimlico Race Course. He was listed as a 20-1 long shot on the morning line, breaking from post 11 in a field of twelve. When the gates opened, he rushed to the front and overtook Kentucky Derby winner Super Saver to grab the lead, passing the stands for the first time. On the front end, First Dude set some strenuous fractions: 1/4 mile in 22-4/5, 1/2 mile down the backstretch in 46-2/5, and 3/4 of a mile in 1:11-1/5. Around the final turn, both Lookin At Lucky and Caracortado passed First Dude. Then he dug in and fought back to even terms with Lookin At Lucky at the 1/8 pole. In the last 100 yards, Lookin At Lucky pulled ahead to win the Preakness Stakes by one length.

In June, First Dude finished third to Drosselmeyer in the Belmont Stakes at 1 1/2 miles in New York. On the first Saturday of August, he finished third to old rival Lookin At Lucky in the Grade 1 Haskell Invitational Handicap at one and one-eighth miles at Monmouth Park in New Jersey. On the last Saturday of August, he finished third in the Grade 1 "Mid-Summer Derby" to Afleet Express in the Travers Stakes at one and a quarter miles at Saratoga Race Course. On the last Saturday of September, First Dude finished third to Morning Line in the grade two Pennsylvania Derby at one and an eighth miles at Philadelphia Park. He ended his season with a run at the Breeders Cup Classic, in which he led early but faded out in the final straight to finish in eighth behind the winner, Blame.

=== 2011: four-year-old season ===
After a fourth-place finish in his seasonal debut, owner Don Dizney decided to give First Dude "a change of scenery" and moved him to Southern California-based trainer Bob Baffert. First Dude made his first start for Baffert in the Santa Anita Handicap, but finished sixth behind stablemate Game On Dude after battling for the lead.

Baffert then decided to school First Dude and told jockey Martin Garcia to keep First Dude off the pace and let him make his own moves. He was entered in a $58,000 allowance race on April 9 at Santa Anita Park, and won by more than two lengths.

First Dude then won his second straight race in the Grade 3, $350,000 Alysheba Stakes at one and one sixteenth miles on the dirt at Churchill Downs by a nose on May 6, 2011, on the Kentucky Oaks undercard. The field for the Alysheba was exceptionally deep, including Grade 1 winners Giant Oak and Awesome Gem, multiple Grade II winner Mission Impazible (the 5-2 morning line favorite), and Grade II winners Caracortado and Regal Ransom.

On July 9, 2011, First Dude won his first Grade 1 race in the Hollywood Gold Cup at Hollywood Park. He was taken off the pace by jockey Martin Garcia and, with a quarter mile left to run, charged from fifth place to a nose victory over stablemate Game On Dude and odds-on favorite Twirling Candy. He retired to stud in 2012 at the Double Diamond Farm with the fee of US$7,500 listed in 2020.

=== Notable progeny ===
f = filly

Foaled	Name	Sex	Major wins
2015	Shamrock Rose	f	Breeders' Cup Filly & Mare Sprint

== Death ==
First Dude died on September 23, 2026, at the age of 19.

== Pedigree ==
Pedigree of First Dude
Sire Stephen Got Even bay 1996	A.P. Indy dark brown 1989	Seattle Slew brown 1974	Bold Reasoning
Sire Stephen Got Even bay 1996	A.P. Indy dark brown 1989	Seattle Slew brown 1974	My Charmer
Sire Stephen Got Even bay 1996	A.P. Indy dark brown 1989	Weekend Surprise bay 1980	Secretariat
Sire Stephen Got Even bay 1996	A.P. Indy dark brown 1989	Weekend Surprise bay 1980	Lassie Dear
Sire Stephen Got Even bay 1996	Immerse bay 1988	Cox's Ridge bay 1974	Best Turn
Sire Stephen Got Even bay 1996	Immerse bay 1988	Cox's Ridge bay 1974	Our Martha
Sire Stephen Got Even bay 1996	Immerse bay 1988	Baroness Direct bay 1981	Blushing Groom
Sire Stephen Got Even bay 1996	Immerse bay 1988	Baroness Direct bay 1981	Avum
Dam Run Sarah Run dark brown 2000	Smart Strike bay 1992	Mr. Prospector bay 1970	Raise a Native
Dam Run Sarah Run dark brown 2000	Smart Strike bay 1992	Mr. Prospector bay 1970	Gold Digger
Dam Run Sarah Run dark brown 2000	Smart Strike bay 1992	Classy 'n Smart bay 1981	Smarten
Dam Run Sarah Run dark brown 2000	Smart Strike bay 1992	Classy 'n Smart bay 1981	No Class
Dam Run Sarah Run dark brown 2000	Breech gray 1984	Relaunch gray 1976	In Reality
Dam Run Sarah Run dark brown 2000	Breech gray 1984	Relaunch gray 1976	Foggy Note
Dam Run Sarah Run dark brown 2000	Breech gray 1984	Scatter Plan bay 1968	Quadrangle
Dam Run Sarah Run dark brown 2000	Breech gray 1984	Scatter Plan bay 1968	Purdah

== Sources ==
- Pedigree Profile for First Dude
