= Paddy O'Prado =

American-bred Thoroughbred racehorse

- Sire: El Prado
- Grandsire: Sadler's Wells
- Dam: Fun House
- Damsire: Prized
- Sex: Male
- Foaled: February 15, 2007
- Died: October 22, 2018 (aged 11)
- Country: United States
- Color: Gray
- Breeder: Winchell Thoroughbreds
- Owner: Donegal Racing
- Trainer: Dale L. Romans
- Record: 15: 5-3-3
- Earnings: $1,721,297

Major wins
- Palm Beach Stakes (2010); Colonial Turf Cup (2010); Virginia Derby (2010); Secretariat Stakes (2010); Dixie Stakes (2011)

Paddy O'Prado (February 15, 2007 – October 22, 2018) was an American Thoroughbred racehorse. Bred by Winchell Thoroughbreds, he finished third in the 2010 Kentucky Derby. His regular jockey was Kent Desormeaux.

== Racing career ==
Paddy O'Prado was foaled in Kentucky. He broke his maiden at Gulfstream Park on March 6, 2010, in the Grade 3 $150,000 Palm Beach Stakes. He went on to finish second in the Blue Grass Stakes behind winner Stately Victor, finishing in front of First Dude, Interactif, Make Music For Me and Odysseus. Following his runner up performance in the Blue Grass, he raced in the 2010 Kentucky Derby and finished third behind Super Saver and Ice Box. In the Preakness, he was sixth. At this point, his trainer, Dale Romans, moved him back to the turf. Paddy O'Prado then captured the Grade 2 $500,000 Colonial Turf Cup, the Grade 2 $600,000 Virginia Derby, and the Grade 1 $400,000 Secretariat Stakes. In his 2011 four-year-old debut, on Preakness Day at Pimlico, Paddy O'Prado came from the back of the pack to take the Dixie Stakes from Baryshnikov.

== Retirement ==
Paddy O'Prado fractured one of his right rear sesamoid bones during the Dixie Stakes. He was permanently retired from racing on May 22, 2011. O'Prado stood at Spendthrift Farm for a stud fee of $5,000 before being sent to stud in Turkey, where he died in a paddock accident before the beginning of the 2018 breeding season.
