= 2010 Belmont Stakes =

American horse race

142nd Belmont Stakes
- Belmont Stakes
- "The Test of the Champion"
- Location: Belmont Park; Elmont, New York, U.S.
- Date: June 5, 2010
- Distance: 1 1/2 mi (12 furlongs; 2,414 m)
- Winning horse: Drosselmeyer
- Winning time: 2:31.57
- Final odds: 13.00 (to 1)
- Jockey: Mike E. Smith
- Trainer: William I. Mott
- Owner: WinStar Farm LLC
- Conditions: Fast
- Surface: Dirt

The 2010 Belmont Stakes was the 142nd running of the Belmont Stakes. The race took place on June 5, 2010, and was won by Drosselmeyer, who was ridden by jockey Mike Smith and trained by Bill Mott. It was televised in the United States on the ABC television network.

As the final jewel in the United States Triple Crown of Thoroughbred Racing, the race was run without the elusive championship at stake due to 2010 Kentucky Derby winner Super Saver's loss in the Preakness Stakes. Both the Kentucky Derby and Preakness winners did not run in the race. Uptowncharlybrown finished fifth, but was disqualified and placed last due to losing the eight pound handicapping weight on the backstretch.

Field
Finish	Post	Horse name	Trainer	Jockey	Opening Odds
1	7	Drosselmeyer	Bill Mott	Mike E. Smith	12-1
2	5	Fly Down	Nick Zito	John Velazquez	9-2
3	11	First Dude	Dale Romans	Ramon Dominguez	7-2
4	8	Game On Dude	Bob Baffert	Martin Garcia	10-1
5	10	Stay Put	Steve Margolis	Jamie Theriot	20-1
6	12	Interactif	Todd Pletcher	Javier Castellano	12-1
7	9	Stately Victor	Mike Maker	Alan Garcia	15-1
8	6	Ice Box	Nick Zito	Jose Lezcano	3-1
9	4	Make Music For Me	Alexis Barba	Joel Rosario	10-1
10	1	Dave in Dixie	John Sadler	Calvin Borel	20-1
11	2	Spangled Star	Rick Dutrow	Garrett Gomez	30-1
D	3	Uptowncharlybrown	Kiaran McLaughlin	Rajiv Maragh	10-1

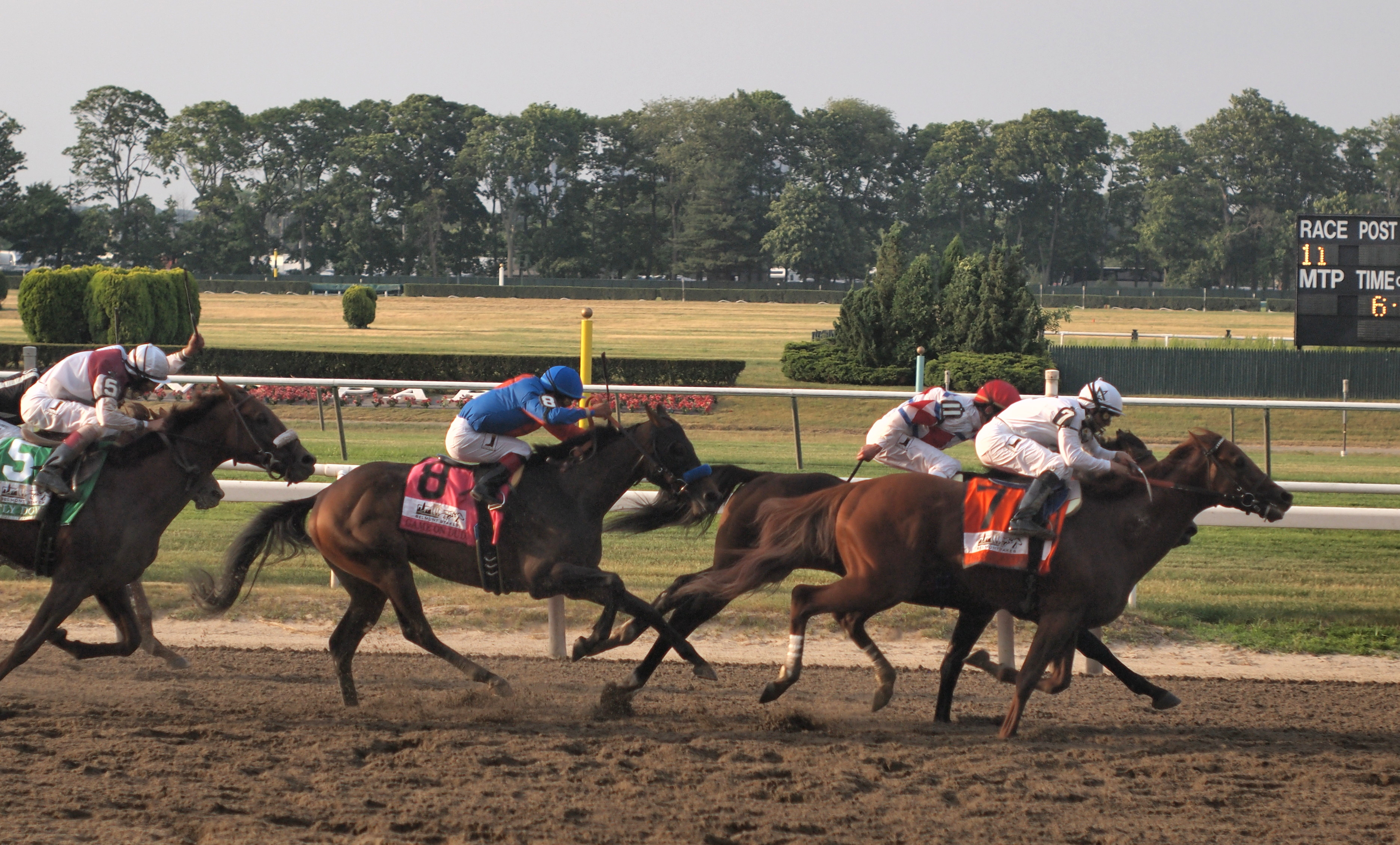
Drosselmeyer (#7) leads into the stretch, followed by First Dude, Game On Dude (#8) and Fly Down (#5).

Payout in $2 prices
Post	Horse	Win	Place	Show
7	Drosselmeyer	$28.00	$11.60	$7.70
5	Fly Down		$6.80	$5.10
11	First Dude			$4.90

- $1 Exacta (7–5): $144.50
- $1 Trifecta (7–5–11): $766.00
- $1 Superfecta (7–5–11–8): $10,658.00

== See also ==
- 2010 Kentucky Derby
- 2010 Preakness Stakes
