= 2010 Preakness Stakes =

135th running of the Preakness Stakes

135th Preakness Stakes
- The Preakness Stakes
- "The Middle Jewel of the Triple Crown" "The Run for the Black-Eyed Susans"
- Location: Pimlico Race Course, Baltimore, Maryland, United States
- Date: May 15, 2010
- Winning horse: Lookin At Lucky
- Winning time: 1:55.47
- Final odds: 2.4-1
- Jockey: Martin Garcia
- Trainer: Bob Baffert
- Conditions: Fast
- Surface: Dirt
- Attendance: ▲96,760

The 2010 Preakness Stakes was the 135th running of the Preakness Stakes thoroughbred horse race. The race took place on May 15, 2010, and was televised in the United States on the NBC television network. Lookin At Lucky, who was jockeyed by Martin Garcia, won the race. Approximate post time was 6:18 p.m. eastern time. The Maryland Jockey Club reported total attendance of 96,760; this is recorded as second highest on the list of American thoroughbred racing top attended events for North America in 2010.

== Payout ==
Program number	Horse name	Win	Place	Show
7	Lookin At Lucky	$6.80	$4.60	$3.80
11	First Dude	-	$16.60	$9.20
6	Jackson Bend	-	-	$6.60

- $2 exacta: (7-11) paid $188.00
- $1 trifecta: (7-11-6) paid $1,385.50
- $1 superfecta: (7–11–6–5) paid $17,126.00

== Full chart ==
Finish position	Margin (lengths)	Post position	Horse name	Jockey	Trainer	Owner	Morning line odds	Purse earnings
1st	0	7	Lookin At Lucky	Martin Garcia	Bob Baffert	Mike Pegram	3-1	$600,000
2nd	3/4	11	First Dude	Ramon Dominguez	Dale Romans	Donald R. Dizney	20-1	$200,000
3rd	1	6	Jackson Bend	Mike E. Smith	Nick Zito	Robert V. LaPenta	12-1	$110,000
4th	2	5	Yawanna Twist	Edgar Prado	Richard E. Dutrow Jr.	Steal Your Face Stab	30-1	$60,000
5th	5	12	Dublin	Garrett Gomez	D. Wayne Lukas	Rob Baker & Wi.Mack	10-1	$30,000
6th	9 3/4	10	Paddy O'Prado	Kent Desormeaux	Dale L. Romans	Donegal Racing	9-2	
7th	10	9	Caracortado	Paul Atkinson	Michael Machowsky	Blahut Racing	10-1	
8th	11	8	Super Saver	Calvin Borel	Todd A. Pletcher	WinStar Farm	5-2 favorite	
9th	11 3/4	2	Schoolyard Dreams	Eibar Coa	Derek S. Ryan	Eric Fein & Ant.Mitola	15-1	
10th	14-1/4	1	Aikenite	Javier Castellano	Todd A. Pletcher	Dogwood Stable	20-1	
11th	17 3/4	3	Pleasant Prince	Julien Leparoux	Wesley A. Ward	Ken and Sarah Ramsey	20-1	
12th	21-1/4	4	Northern Giant	Terry Thompson	D. Wayne Lukas	Westrock Stables	30-1	

- Winning breeder: Gulf Coast Farms; (FL)
- Final time – 1:55:47
- Track condition – Fast
- Attendance - 96,760

== See also ==
- 2010 Kentucky Derby
- 2010 Belmont Stakes
