= Alexis Barba =

American racehorse trainer

Alexis Barba is an American horse trainer.

She trained Make Music For Me, a thoroughbred horse which finished fourth in the 2010 Kentucky Derby. Make Music For Me is known to have late speed which he used to move up from twentieth place. This ability to close (late speed) was displayed earlier in the year in winning the 2010 Pasadena Stakes at Santa Anita Racetrack.

Barba also trained Alphie's Bet, winner of the 2010 Sham Stakes also at Santa Anita Racetrack.

Barba was a protégé of Eddie Gregson, the trainer of 1982 Kentucky Derby winner Gato Del Sol.
