= 2010 Breeders' Cup =

Thoroughbred horse racing event

The 2010 Breeders' Cup World Championships was the 27th edition of thoroughbred racing's season ending premier event, and took place on November 5 and 6 at Churchill Downs in Louisville, Kentucky.

== Friday ==
The attendance was 41,614.

Race Name	Sponsor	Distance/Surface	Restrictions	Purse	Winner
Marathon		1 3/4 miles (2.8 km)	3 yrs+	$500,000	Eldaafer
Juvenile Fillies Turf		1 mile (Turf)	2-year-old fillies	$1 million	More Than Real
Filly & Mare Sprint	Sentient Jet	7/8 mile (1.4 km)	Females	$1 million	Dubai Majesty
Juvenile Fillies	Grey Goose	1 1/16 miles (1.7 km)	2-year-old fillies	$2 million	Awesome Feather
Filly & Mare Turf	Emirates	1 3/8 miles (2.2 km) (Turf)	Females	$2 million	Shared Account
Ladies' Classic		1 1/8 miles (1.8 km)	Females 3 yrs+	$2 million	Unrivaled Belle

== Saturday ==
The attendance was 72,739. The highlight of the day was the much anticipated performance of Zenyatta who was vying for her 20th consecutive victory and second Breeders' Cup Classic.

Race Name	Sponsor	Distance/Surface	Restrictions	Purse	Winner
Juvenile Turf		1 mile (Turf)	2-year-old colts & geldings	$1 million	Pluck
Sprint	Sentient Jet	3/4 mile (1.2 km)	3 yrs+	$2 million	Big Drama
Turf Sprint		5/8 mile (1.0 km) (Turf)	3 yrs+	$1 million	Chamberlain Bridge
Juvenile	Grey Goose	1 1/16 miles (1.7 km)	2-year-old colts & geldings	$2 million	Uncle Mo
Mile	TVG Network	1 mile (Turf)	3 yrs+	$2 million	Goldikova
Dirt Mile		1 mile (one turn)	3 yrs+	$1 million	Dakota Phone
Turf	Emirates	1 1/2 miles (2.4 km) (Turf)	3 yrs+	$3 million	Dangerous Midge
Classic		1 1/4 miles (2.0 km)	3 yrs+	$5 million	Blame

== See also ==
- 2010 Kentucky Derby
