= Lookin At Lucky =

American-bred Thoroughbred racehorse

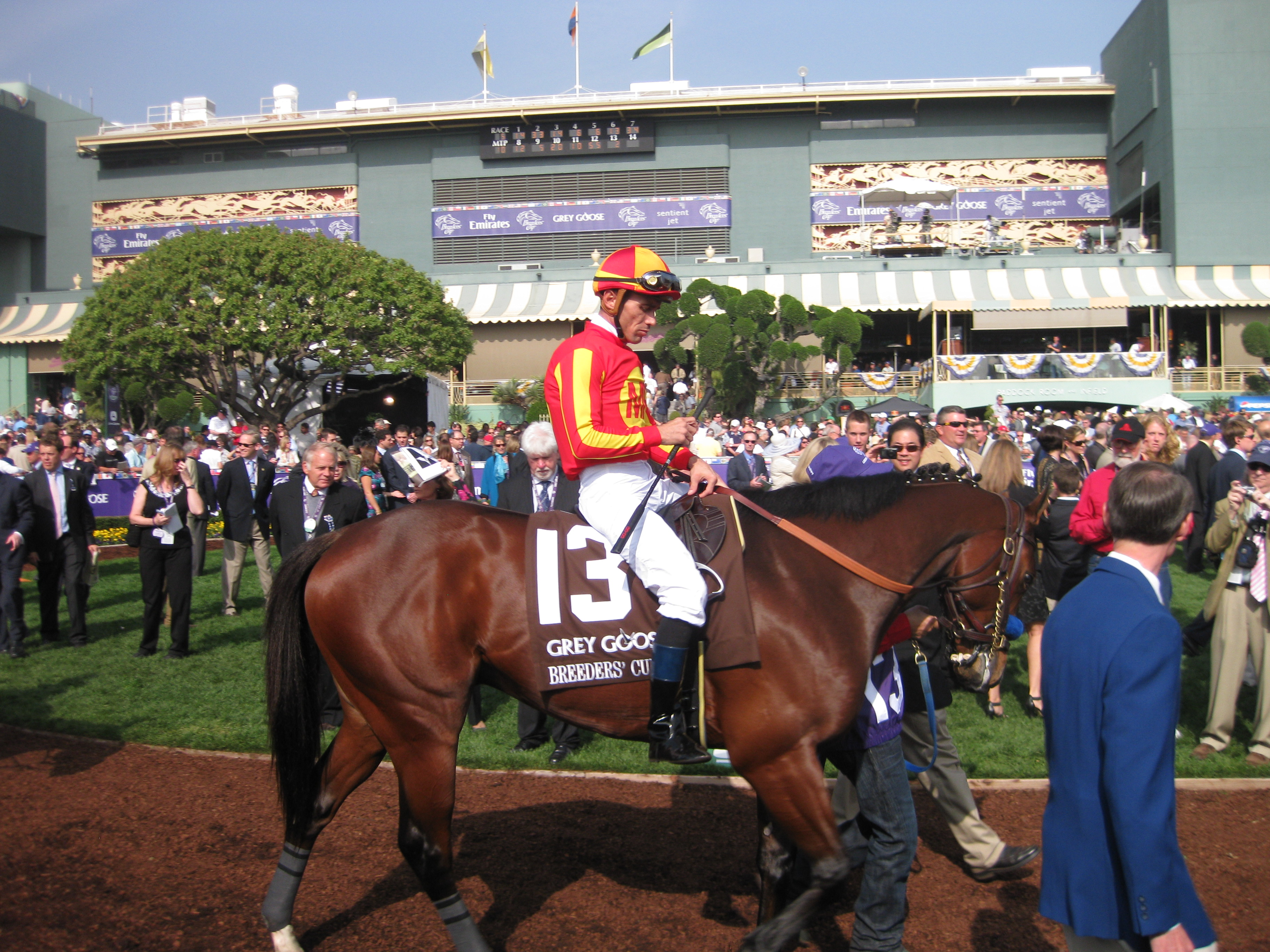
- Lookin At Lucky at 2009 Breeder's Cup Juvenile
- Sire: Smart Strike
- Grandsire: Mr. Prospector
- Dam: Private Feeling
- Damsire: Belong To Me
- Sex: Colt
- Foaled: 2007
- Country: United States
- Colour: Bay
- Breeder: Gulf Coast Farms
- Owner: Coolmore Stud
- Trainer: Bob Baffert
- Record: 13: 9-1-1
- Earnings: US$3,307,278

Major wins
- Best Pal Stakes (2009); Del Mar Futurity (2009); Norfolk Stakes (2009); CashCall Futurity (2009); Rebel Stakes (2010); Haskell Invitational (2010); Indiana Derby (2010); Triple Crown classic race wins: Preakness Stakes (2010)

Awards
- American Champion Two-Year-Old Colt (2009); American Champion Three-Year-Old Male Horse (2010)

Lookin At Lucky (foaled May 27, 2007 in Kentucky) is a champion American Thoroughbred racehorse who won the 2010 Preakness Stakes. He was the 2009 Champion Two-Year-Old and 2010 Champion Three-Year-Old, becoming the first horse in 32 years to win both of these awards.

== Background ==
Lookin At Lucky was sired by Smart Strike, a half-brother to Canadian Triple Crown Winner Dance Smartly. His dam, Private Feeling, was sired by Belong To Me, a son of the North American Leading Sire of 1993, Danzig.

Bred by Gulf Coast Farms, Lookin At Lucky was bought back as a yearling for $35,000 at the 2008 Keeneland September Sale. After working 1/8 of a mile in 10 seconds, he was bought by trainer Bob Baffert at the 2009 Keeneland April Sale for $475,000. He raced for owners Mike Pegram, Karl Watson, and Paul Weitman.

== 2009: Two-Year-Old Season ==
Lookin At Lucky broke his maiden at the Cushion Track at Hollywood Park on July 11 going 6 furlongs.

He followed with a win in the Grade 2 Best Pal Stakes at Del Mar Racetrack. Ridden by Garrett Gomez, he finished the 6 1/2 furlongs in a time of 1:16.06.

His next start was the Del Mar Futurity, which he won in 1:22.85.

Lookin At Lucky solidified his entrance into the Breeders' Cup Juvenile by winning the Grade One Norfolk Stakes with a time of 1:43.11 in a full field of 12.

Going off as the favorite from post 13, Lookin At Lucky had a difficult trip and finished second, a head behind long shot European winnerVale of York, in the Breeders' Cup Juvenile.

On December 19, Lookin At Lucky sealed American Champion Two-Year-Old Colt honors with a win over chief rival Noble's Promise in the CashCall Futurity.

== 2010: Three-Year-Old Season ==
On March 13, Lookin At Lucky made his three-year-old debut at Oaklawn Park with a win in the Rebel Stakes. He won by a head over arch-rival Noble's Promise, even though he stumbled badly during the run down the backstretch.

On April 3, he had a rough trip under Garrett Gomez in the Santa Anita Derby. Bumped, jostled, and virtually ridden into the fence, Lookin At Lucky finished third.

Going into the 2010 Kentucky Derby, Lookin At Lucky was made the favorite after the scratch of Eskendereya. Drawing the number one inside post, he was pinned to the rail and had nowhere to go until a late run to wind up sixth, making it his first off-the-board finish. Trainer Bob Baffert turned to young jockey Martin Garcia and fired Garrett Gomez after three consecutive races where the veteran jockey could not keep the horse out of trouble. On May 15, Garcia rode Lookin At Lucky to a win in the 135th running of the Preakness Stakes at Pimlico Race Course in Baltimore, Maryland. Lookin At Lucky went off as the 2–1 second choice and paid $6.80 to win in a time of 1:55.47, holding off pacesetter First Dude and the late-charging Jackson Bend.

Garcia rode Lookin At Lucky again in the Haskell Invitational. The 6-5 favorite, he broke a bit awkwardly, but Garcia steadied him and positioned him three wide on the first turn. Entering the far turn while still 3 paths wide, he moved past his competitors, winning by four lengths over upcoming Trappe Shot, followed by First Dude and Super Saver, the Kentucky Derby winner. He received a career-best 105 Beyer Speed Figure for the most dominant performance of his career.

Lookin At Lucky developed an illness after the Haskell and missed a month of training. Baffert then pointed him toward the Indiana Derby, held at small Hoosier Park. Lookin At Lucky drew post position 6 in a field of nine horses and became the overwhelming favorite at odds of 2–5. He broke well but fell back to last early and around the first turn. Still in eighth on the backstretch, Lookin At Lucky came five-wide around the far turn, caught the leader in late home-stretch, and won by 1 1/4 lengths. He earned a 103 Beyer Speed Figure for his performance.

Baffert then pointed the horse toward the 27th running of the Breeders' Cup Classic. Lookin At Lucky trained well but was compromised by a "minor infection and a cough" a week before the race. "I had to treat him with antibiotics, and sometimes that's hard on a horse’s system," Baffert said. Lookin At Lucky was healthy for the race but was placed farther back than usual early and finished fourth.

== Stud career ==
In November 2010, Lookin At Lucky was purchased by Coolmore Stud and retired. He then entered stud at Coolmore's Ashford Stud near Versailles, Kentucky. His initial stud fee was set at $35,000.

Lookin At Lucky's first foal was born in January 2012 at Royal Pegasus Farm in Lexington, Kentucky. The foal, a dark bay filly, was out of the Storm Cat mare Awesome. Lookin At Lucky was represented by his first winner in May 2014 when filly Lucky'stormwarning won a maiden race at Gulfstream Park. His first stakes winner came in August 2014 when colt Four Leaf Chief won the Louisiana Cup Juvenile Stakes at Louisiana Downs.

He currently serves as a "shuttle stallion", traveling to Coolmore's Australian operations during the Southern Hemisphere breeding season. In 2012, Lookin At Lucky began shuttling to Chile to stand at Haras Paso Nevado, a farm near Santiago. He shuttled to Chile alongside fellow Ashford stallion Scat Daddy.

=== Notable Progeny ===
Lookin At Lucky's most notable progeny includes:

c = colt, f = filly, g = gelding

Foaled
Name
Sex
Major Wins
2013
Accelerate
c
Santa Anita Handicap, Gold Cup at Santa Anita, Pacific Classic, Awesome Again Stakes, Breeders' Cup Classic (2018)

2018 Champion Older Dirt Male

2013
Conquer (CHI)
c
Clasico Alberto Vial Infante (CHI) (2017)
2013
Full of Luck (CHI)
c
El Derby (CHI) (2017)
2013
Kurilov (CHI)
f
Gran Premio Hipodromo Chile (CHI) (2017)
2014
Wow Cat (CHI)
f
Gran Criterium (CHI), Clasico Tanteo de Potranca (CHI), Clásico Mil Guineas (CHI), Clásico St. Leger (CHI) (2017), Beldame Stakes (2018), Chilean Champion 2 & 3YO Filly

Chilean Horse of the Year in Chile

2015
Dafonda (CHI)
f
Clásico Arturo Lyon Pena (CHI), Clásico Polla de Potrancas (CHI) (2018)
2015
Diane (CHI)
f
Clásico Mil Guineas (CHI) (2018)
2015
Hong Kong Great (CHI) (Note: Originally named El Picaro in Chile. Renamed to Hong Kong Great when transferred to Hong Kong)
c
Clásico Alberto Vial Infante (CHI), Clásico Polla de Potrillos (CHI), Clásico Nacional Ricardo Lyon (CHI) (2018), Singapore Gold Cup (SIN) (2022), Queen Elizabeth II Cup (SIN) (2023)
2015
La Cantita (CHI)
f
Clásico Las Oaks (CHI) (2018)
2015
Toplucky (CHI)
c
Grad Premio Club Hipico de Santiago (CHI) (2019)
2016
Country House
c
Kentucky Derby (2019)
2016
Muy Gracioso (CHI)
c
Clásico Alberto Vial Infanto (CHI) (2019)
2016
Panfield (CHI) (Note: Originally named Look Pen in Chile. Renamed to Panfield when transferred to Hong Kong)
c
Clásico Polla de Potrillos (CHI), Clásico Nacional Ricardo Lyon, Clásico El Ensayo (CHI) (2019), Hong Kong Champions & Chater Cup (HK) (2021)
2016
Tokerau (CHI)
c
Clásico Mil Guineas (CHI) (2019)
2018
Nenofar Azul (CHI)
f
El Derby (CHI) (2022)
2018
Royal Luck (CHI)
c
Clásico Alberto Vial Infante (CHI) (2021)
2018
Viejos Tiempos (CHI)
c
Grad Premio Club Hipico de Santiago (CHI) (2022)
2018
Lukka (CHI)
c
Grad Premio Club Hipico de Santiago (CHI), Gran Premio Hipodromo Chile (CHI) (2023)
2019
Racatan (CHI)
c
Clásico Nacional Ricardo Lyon (CHI) (2022)
2022
Test Score
c
Belmont Derby (2025)

== Pedigree ==
Pedigree of Lookin At Lucky
Sire Smart Strike	Mr. Prospector	Raise a Native	Native Dancer
Sire Smart Strike	Mr. Prospector	Raise a Native	Raise You
Sire Smart Strike	Mr. Prospector	Gold Digger	Nashua
Sire Smart Strike	Mr. Prospector	Gold Digger	Sequence
Sire Smart Strike	Classy 'n Smart	Smarten	Cyane
Sire Smart Strike	Classy 'n Smart	Smarten	Smartaire
Sire Smart Strike	Classy 'n Smart	No Class	Nodouble
Sire Smart Strike	Classy 'n Smart	No Class	Classy Quillo
Dam Private Feeling	Belong To Me	Danzig	Northern Dancer
Dam Private Feeling	Belong To Me	Danzig	Pas de Nom
Dam Private Feeling	Belong To Me	Belonging	Exclusive Native
Dam Private Feeling	Belong To Me	Belonging	Straight Deal
Dam Private Feeling	Regal Feeling	Clever Trick	Icecapade
Dam Private Feeling	Regal Feeling	Clever Trick	Kankakee Miss
Dam Private Feeling	Regal Feeling	Sharp Belle	Native Charger
Dam Private Feeling	Regal Feeling	Sharp Belle	Sleek Dancer

== See also ==
- List of racehorses
