= 2010 Kentucky Derby =

Horse race

136th Kentucky Derby
- Kentucky Derby
- Official logo for the 2010 Kentucky Derby
- Location: Churchill Downs
- Date: May 1, 2010
- Winning horse: Super Saver
- Winning time: 2:04.45
- Starting price: 8-1
- Jockey: Calvin Borel
- Trainer: Todd Pletcher
- Owner: WinStar Farm
- Conditions: Sloppy
- Surface: Dirt
- Attendance: 155,804

The 2010 Kentucky Derby was the 136th running of the Kentucky Derby. The race took place on May 1, 2010, and was televised in the United States on the NBC television network. The post time was 6:32 p.m. EDT (10:32 p.m. UTC). The stakes of the race were US$2,185,200. The race was sponsored by Yum! Brands and hence officially was called Kentucky Derby Presented by Yum! Brands.

Super Saver won the race with Calvin Borel as jockey. Borel became the first jockey to win three Kentucky Derby titles in a four-year span. Ice Box, Paddy O'Prado and Make Music for Me finished second, third and fourth, respectively. Attendance was listed at 155,804, making it the sixth-largest in Derby history. Total betting exceeded US$30 million for the main pool, and US$21 million for the exacta.

== Payout ==
"And they're coming down to the finish, and it is ... Super Saver ... a late run from Ice Box, but it's Super Saver and Calvin Borel, the unflappable Calvin Borel, riding that rail to victory once again in the Kentucky Derby!"

— NBC Sports race announcer Tom Durkin calling the end of the race

The 136th Kentucky Derby Payout Schedule

Program Number	Horse Name	Win	Place	Show
4	Super Saver	$18.00	$8.80	$6.00
2	Ice Box	-	$11.20	$8.00
10	Paddy O'Prado	-	-	$7.40

- $2 Exacta: (4–2) paid $152.40
- $1 Trifecta: (4–2–10) paid $1,168.70
- $1 Superfecta: (4–2–10–9) paid $101,284.60

== The field ==
After early favorite Eskendereya was withdrawn due to a swollen leg the week prior to the 2010 Kentucky Derby, the field was left with no clear favorite. Lookin At Lucky was the race-time favorite based on his strong form at age two (Del Mar Futurity, Norfolk Stakes and CashCall Futurity), but only at odds of 6–1 against victory. Those odds tied the highest odds for a favorite in the history of the Derby. Super Saver, who had won the Kentucky Jockey Club Stakes at two and finished second in the Arkansas Derby, went off at odds of 8–1. Post positions were drawn Thursday, April 29, 2010.

== Results ==
In what was considered "the most wide-open Derby in years", Super Saver hit the lead at the top of the stretch and held on to win the 136th Kentucky Derby. Jockey Calvin Borel captured his third Derby win in the last four years, while trainer Todd Pletcher picked up his first Derby victory in 25 tries.

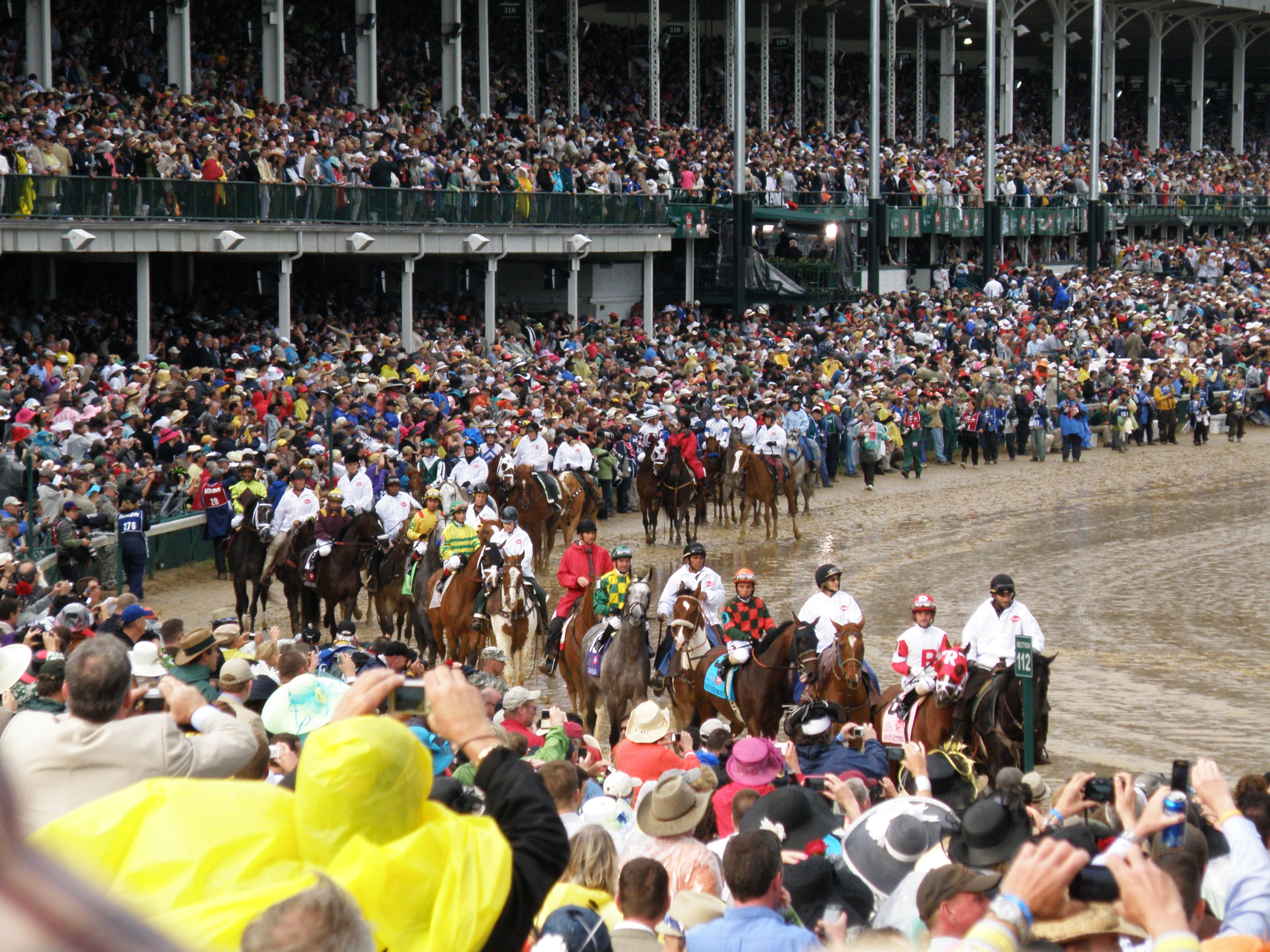
Procession to the starting gate.

The track was wet and sloppy due to rain the previous night and nearly all day on Derby Day. After a windy, rain-soaked day at Churchill Downs, the sun came out just shortly before race time. The winning time was 2:04.45, and the margin of victory was listed as 2 1/2 lengths. Trained by Nick Zito, Ice Box came from well back in the pack to narrowly beat Paddy O'Prado for second place.

Super Saver started the day as the second favorite behind Lookin At Lucky. Coming out of the No. 4 gate, Borel immediately broke towards the inside rail, a strategy he often employs. He then pulled the horse back, rounding the final turn in fourth place, and charged to victory along the rail, holding off the impressive late charge from Ice Box on the sloppy track. It was the horse's first victory since winning the Kentucky Jockey Club Stakes as a two-year-old. Pre-race favorite Lookin At Lucky was hampered by drawing the No. 1 post. He was pinned on the rail early and did not get adequate running room until it was too late, finishing sixth.

Finish	Post	Horse name	Trainer	Jockey	Morning odds	Final odds to $1	Earnings
1	4	Super Saver	Todd Pletcher	Calvin Borel	15	8	$1,425,200
2	2	Ice Box	Nick Zito	Jose Lezcano	10	11.7	$400,000
3	10	Paddy O'Prado	Dale Romans	Kent Desormeaux	20	12.3	$200,000
4	9	Make Music for Me	Alexis Barba	Joel Rosario	50	30	$100,000
5	3	Noble's Promise	Kenny McPeek	Willie Martinez	12	24.9	$60,000
6	1	Lookin at Lucky	Bob Baffert	Garrett Gomez	3	6.3	
7	17	Dublin	D. Wayne Lukas	Terry J. Thompson	12	20	
8	6	Stately Victor	Michael Maker	Alan Garcia	30	20.2	
9	14	Mission Impazible	Todd Pletcher	Rajiv Maragh	20	16.7	
10	11	Devil May Care	Todd Pletcher	John Velazquez	10	10.9	
11	7	American Lion	Eoin Harty	David Flores	30	23.2	
12	13	Jackson Bend	Nick Zito	Mike E. Smith	15	23	
13	15	Discreetly Mine	Todd Pletcher	Javier Castellano	30	31.6	
14	8	Dean's Kitten	Michael Maker	Robby Albarado	50	25.7	
15	12	Conveyance	Bob Baffert	Martin Garcia	12	27	
16	19	Homeboykris	Richard Dutrow, Jr.	Ramon Dominguez	50	27	
17	20	Sidney's Candy	John W. Sadler	Joe Talamo	5	9.5	
18	5	Line of David	John W. Sadler	Rafael Bejarano	30	19.9	
19	16	Awesome Act	Jeremy Noseda	Julien Leparoux	10	11.6	
20	18	Backtalk	Thomas M. Amoss	Miguel Mena	50	23.1	

- Margins – 2 1/2 lengths, neck
- Time – 2:04:45
- Track – Sloppy

== Exotic wager ==
Brian Palmer used the "successful $1 bet on the superfecta" in the 2010 Kentucky Derby that "paid a whopping $101,284.60" as an example of the controversial high-risk, high-payout exotic bets that were observed by track-watchers since the 1970s. Palmer compared these horse racing bets to the controversial emerging exotic financial instruments that concerned then-chairman of the Federal Reserve Paul Volcker in 1980. He argued that just as the exotic wagers survived the media controversy so will the exotic options.

== Subsequent Grade I wins ==
Although Super Saver never won another race, several entries recorded subsequent Grade I wins:

- Devil May Care – Mother Goose, Coaching Club American Oaks
- Discretely Mine – King's Bishop Stakes
- Jackson Bend – 2011 Forego Stakes, 2012 Carter Handicap
- Lookin at Lucky – Preakness, Haskell Invitational
- Paddy O'Prado – Secretariat Stakes

== Subsequent breeding careers ==
Leading progeny of participants in the 2010 Kentucky Derby are as follows:

Lookin at Lucky (6th)

- Country House – 2019 Kentucky Derby
- Accelerate – 2018 Breeders' Cup Classic, Santa Anita Handicap, Gold Cup at Santa Anita, Pacific Classic, Awesome Again Stakes
- Wow Cat – Beldame Stakes, Chilean St Leger

Super Saver (1st)

- Runhappy – Breeders' Cup Sprint, King's Bishop Stakes, Malibu Stakes
- Competitive Edge – Hopeful Stakes

Sources: American Classic Pedigrees, Equibase, Blood-Horse Stallion Register

== See also ==
- 2010 Preakness Stakes
- 2010 Belmont Stakes
- 2010 Breeders' Cup
