= Stately Victor =

American-bred Thoroughbred racehorse

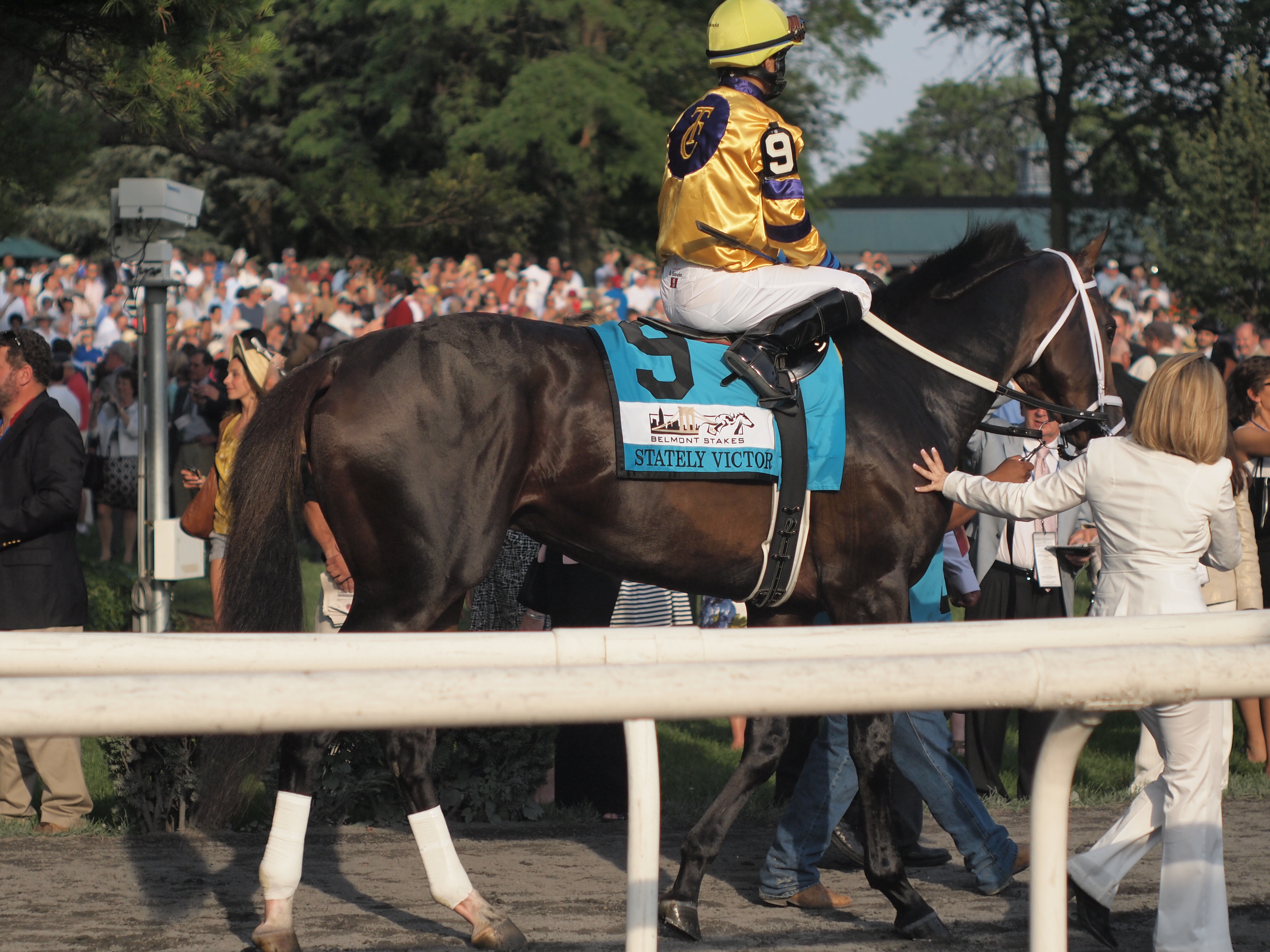
- Stately Victor at the Belmont Stakes in 2010
- Sire: Ghostzapper
- Grandsire: Awesome Again
- Dam: Collect The Cash
- Damsire: Dynaformer
- Sex: Stallion
- Foaled: 2007
- Country: United States
- Colour: Bay
- Breeder: Adena Springs
- Owner: Thomas F. & Jack Conway
- Trainer: Michael J. Maker
- Record: 8: 2-1-0
- Earnings: US$493,213

Major wins
- Blue Grass Stakes (2010); Ontario Derby (2010)
- Last updated on April 11, 2010

Stately Victor (foaled May 1, 2007 in Kentucky) is an American Thoroughbred racehorse. He ran in the 2010 Kentucky Derby, coming in eighth. Bred by Frank Stronach's Adena Springs, he is a son of Ghostzapper, the 2004 American Horse of the Year and ranked number one in the world that year. He is out of the mare Collect The Cash, a daughter of Dynaformer, the sire of Barbaro.

Owned by Thomas F. and Jack Conway (The latter is a former Attorney General of Kentucky and once a Kentucky Democratic Party candidate for the United States Senate), Stately Victor won the Grade 1 Blue Grass Stakes at Keeneland on April 10, 2010, prior to running in the Kentucky Derby.
