= Ice Box (horse) =

American-bred Thoroughbred racehorse

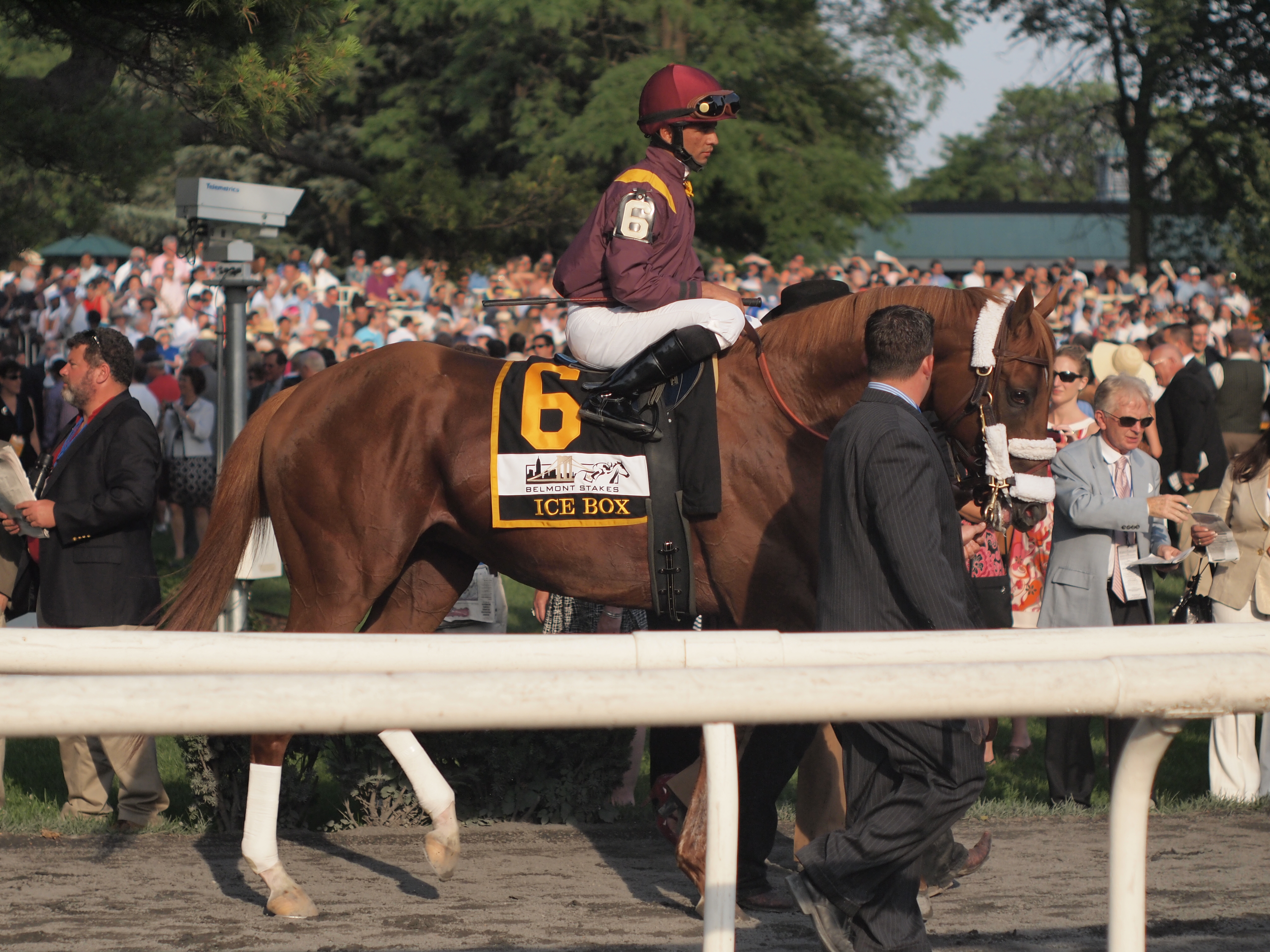
- 2010 Belmont Stakes
- Sire: Pulpit
- Grandsire: A.P. Indy
- Dam: Spice Island
- Damsire: Tabasco Cat
- Sex: Colt
- Foaled: 2007
- Country: United States
- Color: Chestnut
- Breeder: Denlea Park
- Owner: Robert V. LaPenta
- Trainer: Nick Zito
- Record: 16-3-1-0
- Earnings: $948,068

Major wins
- Florida Derby (2010)
- Last updated on 28 September 2022

Ice Box (foaled 29 March 2007 in Kentucky) is a retired Thoroughbred racehorse. He is owned by Robert V. LaPenta, and trained by Nick Zito.

Sired by Pulpit out of Spice Island, he is descended from A.P. Indy, Tabasco Cat, Mr. Prospector, Secretariat, Seattle Slew and Alydar, and is kin to 2009 Triple Crown race winners Mine That Bird and Summer Bird.

He won the Florida Derby and qualified for the 2010 Kentucky Derby. From the second post with 10-1 morning odds, he placed directly behind winner Super Saver after a fast run in the final furlong. Ice Box did not race in the 2010 Preakness Stakes. Ice Box was 9th in the Belmont Stakes and did not place in the Travers Stakes, Haskell Invitational Stakes or Monmouth Cup Stakes in 2010. He finished badly (unplaced) in the 2011 Breeders Cup Classics.

== Stud ==
Ice Box entered stud in 2012 at Calumet Farm. The following year he served at Three Chimneys Farm. In 2015 he was moved to Millennium Farms in Lexington, Kentucky. In 2020 he stood at Cabin Creek Farm in Bernville, Pennsylvania for a fee $3,500. In 2023 he is standing at the Indiana Stallion Station for $1,000.
