= 2001 in sports =

2001 in sports describes the year's events in world sport.

== Alpine skiing ==
- Alpine Skiing World Cup
  - Men's overall season champion: Hermann Maier, Austria
  - Women's overall season champion: Janica Kostelić, Croatia

== American football ==
- Super Bowl XXXV – the Baltimore Ravens (AFC) won 34–7 over the New York Giants (NFC)
  - Location: Raymond James Stadium
  - Attendance: 71,921
  - MVP: Ray Lewis, LB (Baltimore)
- XFL is founded by WWE Chairman Vince McMahon, but the league folded that same year, after the Los Angeles Xtreme won the league's only championship.
- Orange Bowl (2000 season):
  - The Oklahoma Sooners won 13–2 over the Florida State Seminoles in the BCS National Championship Game
- Memorial Stadium, former home of the Baltimore Colts and Baltimore Ravens is demolished
- INVESCO Field at Mile High opens up on September 10, 2001, as the Denver Broncos defeated the New York Giants 31–20.
- September 30 – New England Patriots quarterback Tom Brady, a 6th round, 199th pick from the 2000 NFL draft, makes his first professional start after 8-year quarterback Drew Bledsoe suffered a severe injury in a Week 2 game vs. the New York Jets. This would mark a turning point for both the franchise and the NFL, as Brady would lead the Patriots to their first Super Bowl title 5 months later and would lead them to 8 more appearances and 5 more titles in the next 17 years.
- On December 16, 2001, Bottlegate occurs

== Association football ==
- Confederations Cup – Held one year before the 2002 FIFA World Cup Korea/Japan, this tournament served as a prelude, for both South Korea & Japan and the participating nations. France defeated Japan to win the tournament.
- Champions' League – Bayern Munich won 5–4 on penalties, in the final against Valencia, after a 1–1 draw at the end of the match. This was Bayern Munich's 4th European Cup title.
- UEFA Cup – Liverpool won 5–4 after extra-time, in the final against Alavés, with an unfortunate own goal/golden goal by Delfi Gelí. This was Liverpool's third UEFA Cup title.
- European Super Cup – Liverpool beat Bayern Munich 3–2, winning the cup for the second time.
- Intercontinental Cup – Bayern Munich beat Boca Juniors 1–0, winning the cup for the second time.
- Asian Champions Cup – Korean side Suwon Samsung Bluewings won their first Asian Champions Cup crown, defeating Júbilo Iwata 1–0. They also lifted the 2001 Asian Super Cup.
- The world record for largest victory in an international football match was set by Australia in a 0–22 victory against Tonga on April 9. Australia set this record again with a 31–0 victory against American Samoa on April 11. The unbalanced nature of these matches prompted changes to the FIFA qualification process.

== Athletics ==
- May – Roman Šebrle breaks a 9.000 points barrier in decathlon event.
- August – 2001 World Championships in Athletics held at Edmonton, Alberta, Canada

== Australian rules football ==
- Australian Football League
  - Fremantle equals St. Kilda's 1910 record for the worst start by a team that did not suffer a winless season, beginning with seventeen losses before a huge comeback upset over third-placed Hawthorn. It was equalled by Greater Western Sydney in 2013.
  - The Brisbane Lions win the 105th AFL premiership beating Essendon 15.18 (108) to 12.10 (82).
  - Brownlow Medal awarded to Jason Akermanis (Brisbane Lions)

== Baseball ==
- World Series – only 4 seasons old, the Arizona Diamondbacks became the youngest franchise to win a World Series by defeating the New York Yankees 4 games to 3. Series co-MVPs were Randy Johnson and Curt Schilling, both of Arizona.
- The Seattle Mariners tied the 1906 Chicago Cubs’ record with 116 regular season wins.
- Barry Bonds set the record for most home runs in a season with 73.
- Season MVPs – National League: Barry Bonds, San Francisco Giants. American League: Ichiro Suzuki, Seattle Mariners.
- Rookies of the Year – National League: Albert Pujols, St. Louis Cardinals. American League: Ichiro Suzuki, Seattle.
- Cy Young Award – National League: Randy Johnson, Arizona. American League: Roger Clemens, New York.
- Japan Series – The Yakult Swallows defeat the Osaka Kintetsu Buffaloes 4 games to 1. The Swallows' Atsuya Furuta is named Series MVP.

== Basketball ==
- NBA –
  - The Los Angeles Lakers defeat the Philadelphia 76ers, 4 games to 1 in the NBA Finals. The Lakers only loss in the postseason comes in Game 1 of the Finals, which the 76ers win in overtime.
  - October 30 – Michael Jordan returns to the National Basketball Association with the Washington Wizards after 3½ years (the Wizards lose 93–91 to the New York Knicks).
- NCAA Men's Basketball Championship –
  - Duke wins 82–72 over Arizona
- WNBA Finals –
  - Los Angeles Sparks win 2 games to 0 over the Charlotte Sting, earning the franchise's first championship
- Euroleague Final:
  - In the first Euroleague to be operated by Euroleague Basketball (company), Kinder Bologna defeats TAU Cerámica 3–2 in the best-of-five series.
- Suproleague Final:
  - In the only edition of the rival FIBA-sponsored competition, Maccabi Tel Aviv defeats Panathinaikos 81–67 in the one-off final.
- Chinese Basketball Association finals:
  - Bayi Rockets defeat Shanghai Sharks, 3 games to 1
- National Basketball League (Australia) Finals:
  - Wollongong Hawks defeated the Townsville Crocodiles 2–1 in the best-of-three final series.
- After a season of conflict between ULEB and FIBA, the two bodies settle their feud, with the Suproleague merging into the Euroleague.

== Boxing ==
- March 3 – John Ruiz defeats Evander Holyfield in their second fight by a decision in 12 rounds, winning the WBA's World Heavyweight Championship, becoming the first Hispanic to win the world Heavyweight title.
- April 22 – Lennox Lewis vs. Hasim Rahman: Hasim Rahman defeats Lennox Lewis in an upset win.
- June 3 to June 10 – World Amateur Boxing Championships held in Belfast, Northern Ireland
- September 29 – in a gala event dedicated to the victims and rescuers of 9/11, Bernard Hopkins defeats Félix Trinidad by a knockout in round 12 to unify the World Middleweight Championship

== Canadian football ==
- November 25 – the Calgary Stampeders win the 89th Grey Cup game, defeating the Winnipeg Blue Bombers 27–19 at Olympic Stadium in Montreal.
- November 29 – the UBC Thunderbirds win the Vanier Cup, defeating the Ottawa Gee-Gees 39–23.

== Cricket ==
- February 25 – death of Sir Donald Bradman, Australian Test cricketer who retains the highest Test match batting average of 99.94
- The Ashes – Australia defeats England 4–1
- V.V.S. Laxman becomes the first Indian to score 250 in a Test match as India fight back from following on to win the Second Test against Australia, ending the Australians' record 16 match winning streak. India goes on to win the series 2–1.
- County Championship (England and Wales) – Yorkshire
- ICC Trophy – Netherlands

== Cycle racing ==
Road bicycle racing

- Giro d'Italia won by Gilberto Simoni of Italy
- Tour de France won by Lance Armstrong of USA (Rescinded)
- UCI Road World Championships – Men's road race – Óscar Freire of Spain

Cyclo-cross

- UCI Cyclo-cross World Championships in Tábor, Czech Republic (February 3–February 4)
  - Men's Competition won by Erwin Vervecken
  - Women's Competition won by Hanka Kupfernagel

== Dogsled racing ==
- Iditarod Trail Sled Dog Race Champion
  - Doug Swingley with lead dogs: Stormy & Pepi

== Field hockey ==
- Men's Champions Trophy: Germany
- Women's Champions Trophy: Argentina

== Figure skating ==
- World Figure Skating Championships –
  - Men's champion: Evgeni Plushenko, Russia
  - Ladies' champion: Michelle Kwan, United States
  - Pairs' champions: Jamie Salé and David Pelletier, Canada
  - Ice dance champions: Barbara Fusar-Poli and Maurizio Margaglio

== Floorball ==
- Women's World Floorball Championships
  - Champion: Finland
- Men's under-19 World Floorball Championships
  - Champion: Sweden
- European Cup
  - Men's champion: Helsingfors IFK
  - Women's champion: Balrog IK

== Gaelic Athletic Association ==
- Camogie
  - All-Ireland Camogie Champion: Tipperary
  - National Camogie League: Cork
- Gaelic football
  - All-Ireland Senior Football Championship – Galhiway 0–17 died Meath 0–8
  - National Football League – Mayo 0–13 died Galway 0–12
- Ladies' Gaelic football
  - All-Ireland Senior Football Champion: Laois
  - National Football League: Clare
- Hurling
  - All-Ireland Senior Hurling Championship – Tipperary 2–18 died Galway 2–15
  - National Hurling League – Tipperary 1–19 beat Clare 0–17

== Golf ==
Men's professional

- Masters Tournament – Tiger Woods becomes the first golfer in history to hold all four major championship titles at the same time.
- U.S. Open – Retief Goosen
- British Open – David Duval
- PGA Championship – David Toms
- PGA Tour money leader – Tiger Woods – $5,687,777
- PGA Tour Player of the Year – Tiger Woods
- PGA Tour Rookie of the Year – Charles Howell III
- Senior PGA Tour money leader – Allen Doyle – $2,553,582
- Ryder Cup postponed until 2002.

Men's amateur

- British Amateur – Michael Hoey
- U.S. Amateur – Bubba Dickerson
- European Amateur – Stephen Browne

Women's professional

- Nabisco Championship – Annika Sörenstam
- LPGA Championship – Karrie Webb
- U.S. Women's Open – Karrie Webb
- Women's British Open – Se Ri Pak
- LPGA Tour money leader – Annika Sörenstam – $2,105,868

== Handball ==
- 2001 World Men's Handball Championship – won by France
- 2001 World Women's Handball Championship – won by Russia

== Harness racing ==
- North America Cup – Bettor's Delight
- United States Pacing Triple Crown races –
  1. Cane Pace – Four Starzz Shark
  2. Little Brown Jug – Bettor's Delight
  3. Messenger Stakes – Bagel Beach Boy
- United States Trotting Triple Crown races –
  1. Hambletonian – Scarlet Knight
  2. Yonkers Trot – Banker Hall
  3. Kentucky Futurity – Chaising Tail
- Australian Inter Dominion Harness Racing Championship –
  - Pacers: Yulestar
  - Trotters: Take A Moment

== Horse racing ==
Steeplechases

- Cheltenham Gold Cup – not held due to the 2001 United Kingdom foot-and-mouth crisis
- Grand National – Red Marauder

Hurdle races

- Champion Hurdle – not held due to the 2001 United Kingdom foot-and-mouth crisis

Flat races

- September 1, 2001: Jockey Tim Moccasin won his 14th consecutive race, a North American record, at Marquis Downs in Saskatoon, Saskatchewan, Canada.
- Australia – Melbourne Cup won by Ethereal
- Canada – Queen's Plate won by Dancethruthedawn
- Dubai – Dubai World Cup won by Captain Steve
- France – Prix de l'Arc de Triomphe won by Sakhee
- Ireland – Irish Derby Stakes won by Galileo
- Japan – Japan Cup won by Jungle Pocket
- English Triple Crown races:
  1. 2,000 Guineas Stakes – Golan
  2. The Derby – Galileo
  3. St. Leger Stakes – Milan
- United States Triple Crown races:
  1. Kentucky Derby – Monarchos
  2. Preakness Stakes – Point Given
  3. Belmont Stakes – Point Given
- Breeders' Cup World Thoroughbred Championships:
  1. Breeders' Cup Classic – Tiznow
  2. Breeders' Cup Distaff – Unbridled Elaine
  3. Breeders' Cup Filly & Mare Turf – Banks Hill
  4. Breeders' Cup Juvenile – Johannesburg
  5. Breeders' Cup Juvenile Fillies – Tempera
  6. Breeders' Cup Mile – Val Royal
  7. Breeders' Cup Sprint – Squirtle Squirt
  8. Breeders' Cup Turf – Fantastic Light

== Ice hockey ==
- Art Ross Trophy as the NHL's leading scorer during the regular season: Jaromir Jagr, Pittsburgh Penguins
- Hart Memorial Trophy – for the NHL's Most Valuable Player:
  - Joe Sakic – Colorado Avalanche
- Stanley Cup – Ray Bourque of the Colorado Avalanche won his only Stanley Cup when the Colorado Avalanche defeated the New Jersey Devils 4 games to 3.
- World Hockey Championship
  - Men's champion: Czech Republic defeated Finland
  - Junior Men's champion: Czech Republic defeated Finland
  - Women's champion: Canada defeated the United States

== Lacrosse ==
- Major League Lacrosse begins play as a single-entity-ownership league.
- Long Island Lizards win the first Steinfeld Cup over Baltimore Bayhawks, 15–11.
- The Philadelphia Wings defeat the Toronto Rock 9–8, to win the Champion's Cup.
- The 100th anniversaries of the donations of both the Mann Cup and the Minto Cup.
- The Coquitlam Adanacs win the 100th Mann Cup.
- The St. Catharines Athletics win the 100th Minto Cup.
- The Wallaceburg Red Devils win the Founders Cup.

== Mixed martial arts ==
The following is a list of major noteworthy MMA events during 2001 in chronological order.

Date	Event	Alternate Name/s	Location	Attendance	PPV Buyrate	Notes
February 23	UFC 30: Battle on the Boardwalk	—N/a	(United States) Atlantic City, New Jersey, USA	—N/a	—N/a	First UFC event under ownership of Zuffa.
March 25	Pride 13 – Collision Course	—N/a	Saitama, Japan	—N/a	—N/a	This was the first Pride event allowing knee strikes to the head of someone in the "four-points" position.
May 4	UFC 31: Locked and Loaded	—N/a	(United States) Atlantic City, New Jersey, USA	—N/a	—N/a	UFC rule change, weight classes redefined to present standard. Introduces middleweight division.
May 27	Pride 14 – Clash of the Titans	—N/a	Yokohama, Japan	—N/a	—N/a	—N/a
June 29	UFC 32: Showdown in the Meadowlands	—N/a	(United States) East Rutherford, New Jersey, USA	12,500	—N/a	This event marked the last appearance of longtime commentator Jeff Blatnick.
July 29	Pride 15: Raging Rumble	—N/a	Saitama, Japan	27,323	—N/a	—N/a
September 24	Pride 16: Beasts From the East	—N/a	Osaka, Japan	—N/a	—N/a	This event featured the return of Don Frye in his first fight since June 1997.
September 28	UFC 33: Victory in Vegas	—N/a	(United States) Las Vegas, Nevada, USA	9,500	75,000	This was the first event to be sanctioned by the Nevada State Athletic Commission.
November 2	UFC 34: High Voltage	—N/a	(United States) Las Vegas, Nevada, USA	9,000	65,000	—N/a
November 3	Pride 17: Championship Chaos	—N/a	Tokyo, Japan	—N/a	—N/a	This event featured the first two Pride title fights, for heavyweight and middleweight champions.
December 23	Pride 18: Cold Fury 2	—N/a	Fukuoka, Japan	—N/a	—N/a	—N/a

== Orienteering ==
- Orienteering included as an event for the first time in the World Games held 18–19 August in Akita, Japan.

== Radiosport ==
- Fourth High Speed Telegraphy World Championship held in Constanța, Romania.

== Rugby league ==
- January 26 at Bolton, England – 2001 World Club Challenge match is won by St. Helens 20–18 over the Brisbane Broncos at Reebok Stadium before 16,041.
- July 1 at Brisbane, Queensland – 2001 State of Origin is won by Queensland in the third and deciding match of the series against New South Wales at ANZ Stadium before 49,441.
- September 30 at Sydney, Australia – 2001 NRL season culminates in the Newcastle Knights' 30–24 win over the Parramatta Eels in the Grand Final at Stadium Australia before 90,414.
- October 13 at Manchester, England – Super League VI culminates in the Bradford Bulls' 37–6 win against the Wigan Warriors in the Grand Final at Old Trafford before 60,164.
- November 24 at Wigan, England – in the 2001 Kangaroo tour's last match, Australia defeat Great Britain 28–12 in the third and deciding test match in The Ashes series at JJB Stadium before 25,011.

== Rugby union ==
- 107th Six Nations Championship series is won by England
- Tri Nations – Australia
- Heineken Cup – Leicester Tigers 34–30 Stade Français Paris

== Skydiving ==
- The World FreeFall Convention was moved from Quincy, Illinois, to Rantoul.

== Snooker ==
- World Snooker Championship – Ronnie O'Sullivan beats John Higgins 18–14
- World rankings – Mark Williams remains world number one for 2001/02

== Swimming ==
- Ninth World LC Championships, held in Fukuoka, Japan (July 22–29)
  - United States wins the most medals (26), Australia the most gold medals (13)
- Fifth European SC Championships, held in Antwerp, Belgium (December 13–16)
  - Germany wins the most medals (17), and the most gold medals (6)
- January 28 – Mark Foster regains the world record in the men's 50m freestyle (short course) at a swimming meet in Paris, France, clocking 21.13

== Taekwondo ==
- World Championships held in Jeju, South Korea

== Tennis ==
- Grand Slam in tennis men's results:
  1. Australian Open – Andre Agassi
  2. French Open – Gustavo Kuerten
  3. Wimbledon championships – Goran Ivanišević
  4. US Open – Lleyton Hewitt
- Grand Slam in tennis women's results:
  1. Australian Open – Jennifer Capriati
  2. French Open – Jennifer Capriati
  3. Wimbledon championships – Venus Williams
  4. U.S. Open – Venus Williams
- Davis Cup – France won 3–2 over Australia in world tennis.

== Volleyball ==
- Men's World League: Brazil
- Men's European Championship: Yugoslavia
- Women's World Grand Prix: USA
- Women's European Championship: Russia

== Water polo ==
- Men's World Championship: Spain
- Men's European Championship: Yugoslavia
- Women's World Championship: Italy
- Women's European Championship: Hungary

== Multi-sport events ==
- Third East Asian Games held in Osaka, Japan
- Summer Goodwill Games held in Brisbane, Australia
- Sixth World Games held in Akita, Japan
- 14th Mediterranean Games held in Tunis, Tunisia
- 21st Summer Universiade held in Beijing, China
- 20th Winter Universiade held in Zakopane, Poland

== Awards ==
- Associated Press Male Athlete of the Year – Barry Bonds, Major League Baseball
- Associated Press Female Athlete of the Year – Jennifer Capriati, Tennis
