= 2001 Preakness Stakes =

126th running of the Preakness Stakes

126th Preakness Stakes
- The Preakness Stakes
- "The Middle Jewel of the Triple Crown" "The Run for the Black-Eyed Susans"
- Location: Pimlico Race Course, Baltimore, Maryland, United States
- Date: May 19, 2001
- Winning horse: Point Given
- Jockey: Gary Stevens
- Trainer: Bob Baffert
- Conditions: Fast
- Surface: Dirt

The 2001 Preakness Stakes was the 126th running of the Preakness Stakes thoroughbred horse race. The race took place on May 19, 2001, and was televised in the United States on the NBC television network. Point Given, who was jockeyed by Gary Stevens, won the race by two and one quarter lengths over runner-up A P Valentine. Approximate post time was 6:09 p.m. Eastern Time. The race was run over a fast track in a final time of 1:55.51. The Maryland Jockey Club reported total attendance of 118,926, this is recorded as second highest on the list of American thoroughbred racing top attended events for North America in 2001.

== Payout ==
The 126th Preakness Stakes Payout Schedule

Program Number	Horse Name	Win	Place	Show
11	Point Given	$6.60	$5.00	$4.00
4	A P Valentine	-	$8.20	$5.20
5	Congaree	-	-	$3.40

- $2 Exacta: (11–4) paid $81.40
- $2 Trifecta: (11–4–5) paid $279.00
- $1 Superfecta: (11–4–5–10) paid $717.13

== The full chart ==
Finish Position	Margin (lengths)	Post Position	Horse name	Jockey	Trainer	Owner	Post Time Odds	Purse Earnings
1st	0	11	Point Given	Gary Stevens	Bob Baffert	The Thoroughbred Corporation	2.30-1 favorite	$650,000
2nd	2-1/4	4	A P Valentine	Victor Espinoza	Nicholas P. Zito	Ol Memorial Stable	10.20-1	$200,000
3rd	2 1/2	5	Congaree	Jerry Bailey	Bob Baffert	Stonerside Stable	2.80-1	$100,000
4th	6 3/4	10	Dollar Bill	Pat Day	Dallas Stewart	Gary & Mary West	8.30-1	$50,000
5th	9	3	Griffinite	Shaun Bridgmohan	Jennifer L. Pederson	Paraneck Stable	59.10-1	
6th	10 3/4	7	Monarchos	Jorge Chavez	John T. Ward, Jr.	John C. Oxley	2.30-1	
7th	11 3/4	1	Marciano	Mark Johnston	Timothy F. Ritchey	Win More Stable	46.30-1	
8th	13	9	Bay Eagle	Ramon Dominguez	H. Graham Motion	Lazy Lane Farms	88.30-1	
9th	12	8	Percy Hope	Jon Court	Anthony Reinstedler	Waterfall Stable	52.60-1	
10th	29 1/2	6	Richly Blended	Rick Wilson	Ben W. Perkins, Jr.	Raymond Dweck	17.90-1	
11th	38 3/4	2	Mr. John	Corey Nakatani	W. Elliott Walden	Thomas F. VanMeter	20.20-1	

- Winning Breeder: The Thoroughbred Corporation; (KY)
- Final Time: 1:55.51
- Track Condition: Fast
- Total Attendance: 118,926

== See also ==
- 2001 Kentucky Derby
- 2001 Belmont Stakes
