= Blue Grass Stakes top three finishers =

This is a listing of the horses that finished in either first, second, or third place and the number of starters in the Blue Grass Stakes, an American Grade 1 race for three-year-olds at 1-1/8 miles held at Keeneland Racecourse in Lexington, Kentucky. (List 1973–present)

| Year | Winner | Second | Third | Starters |
|---|---|---|---|---|
| 2025 | Burnham Square | East Avenue | River Thames | 7 |
| 2024 | Sierra Leone | Just A Touch | Epic Ride | 10 |
| 2023 | Tapit Trice | Verifying | Blazing Sevens | 11 |
| 2022 | Zandon | Smile Happy | Emmanuel | 11 |
| 2021 | Essential Quality | Highly Motivated | Rombauer | 9 |
| 2020 | Art Collector | Swiss Skydiver | Rushie | 13 |
| 2019 | Vekoma | Win Win Win | Signalman | 14 |
| 2018 | Good Magic | Flameaway | Free Drop Billy | 14 |
| 2017 | Irap | Practical Joke | McCraken | 7 |
| 2016 | Brody's Cause | My Man Sam | Cherry Wine | 14 |
| 2015 | Carpe Diem | Danzig Moon | Ocho Ocho Ocho | 8 |
| 2014 | Dance With Fate | Medal Count | Pablo Del Monte | 14 |
| 2013 | Java's War | Palace Malice | Charming Kitten | 14 |
| 2012 | Dullahan | Hansen | Gung Ho | 13 |
| 2011 | Brilliant Speed | Twinspired | King Congie | 13 |
| 2010 | Stately Victor | Paddy O'Prado | First Dude | 9 |
| 2009 | General Quarters | Hold Me Back | Massone | 11 |
| 2008 | Monba | Cowboy Cal | Kentucky Bear | 12 |
| 2007 | Dominican | Street Sense | Zanjero | 7 |
| 2006 | Sinister Minister | Storm Treasure | Strong Contender | 9 |
| 2005 | Bandini | High Limit | Closing Argument | 7 |
| 2004 | The Cliff's Edge | Lion Heart | Limehouse | 8 |
| 2003 | Peace Rules | Brancusi | Offlee Wild | 9 |
| 2002 | Harlan's Holiday | Booklet | Ocean Sound | 6 |
| 2001 | Millennium Wind | Songandaprayer | Dollar Bill | 7 |
| 2000 | High Yield | More Than Ready | Wheelaway | 8 |
| 1999 | Menifee | Cat Thief | Vicar | 8 |
| 1998 | Halory Hunter | Lil's Lad | Cape Town | 5 |
| 1997 | Pulpit | Acceptable | Stolen Gold | 7 |
| 1996 | Skip Away | Louis Quatorze | Editor's Note | 7 |
| 1995 | Wild Syn | Suave Prospect | Tejano Run | 6 |
| 1994 | Holy Bull | Valiant Nature | Mahogany Hall | 7 |
| 1993 | Prairie Bayou | Wallenda | Dixieland Heat | 9 |
| 1992 | Pistols and Roses | Conte Di Savoya | Ecstatic Ride | 11 |
| 1991 | Strike the Gold | Fly So Free | Nowork all Play | 6 |
| 1990 | Summer Squall | Land Rush | Unbridled | 5 |
| 1989 | Western Playboy | Dispersal | Tricky Creek | 6 |
| 1988 | Granacus | Intensive Command | Regal Classic | 9 |
| 1987 | War | Leo Castelli | Alysheba | 5 |
| 1986 | Bachelor Beau | Bolshoi Boy | Bold Arrangement | 11 |
| 1985 | Chief's Crown | Floating Reserve | Banner Bob | 4 |
| 1984 | Taylor's Special | Silent King | Charmed Rock | 9 |
| 1983 | Play Fellow | Desert Wine | Copelan | 12 |
| 1982 | Linkage | Gato Del Sol | Wavering Monarch | 9 |
| 1981 | Proud Appeal | Law Me | Golden Derby | 11 |
| 1980 | Rockhill Native | Super Moment | Gold Stage | 11 |
| 1979 | Spectacular Bid | Lot o' Gold | Bishop's Choice | 4 |
| 1978 | Alydar | Raymond Earl | Go Forth | 9 |
| 1977 | For the Moment | Run Dusty Run | Western Wind | 11 |
| 1976 | Honest Pleasure | Certain Roman | Inca Roca | 7 |
| 1975 | Master Derby | Honey Mark | Prince Thou Art | 9 |
| 1974 | Judger | Big Latch | Gold and Myrrh | 14 |
| 1973 | My Gallant | Our Native | Impecunious | 9 |
