= 2001 Belmont Stakes =

American horse race

133rd Belmont Stakes
- Belmont Stakes
- Location: Belmont Park; Elmont, New York
- Date: June 9, 2001
- Distance: 1 1/2 mi (12 furlongs; 2,414 m)
- Winning horse: Point Given
- Winning time: 2:26.56
- Final odds: 1.35 (to 1)
- Jockey: Gary Stevens
- Trainer: Bob Baffert
- Owner: The Thoroughbred Corporation
- Conditions: Fast
- Surface: Dirt

The 2001 Belmont Stakes was the 133rd running of the Belmont Stakes. The 1 1/2-mile (2,400 m) race, known as the "test of the champion" and sometimes called the "final jewel" in thoroughbred horse racing's Triple Crown series, was held on June 9, 2001, three weeks after the Preakness Stakes and five weeks after the Kentucky Derby.

Point Given, trained by Bob Baffert and ridden by Gary Stevens, was one of the most highly regarded three-year-olds of his era. Although he finished fifth in the Kentucky Derby, he rebounded to win the Preakness Stakes. In the Belmont Stakes, he turned in a dominating performance to win by over 12 lengths in one of the fastest times in the history of the race.

== Pre-race ==
In jockey Gary Stevens' opinion, Point Given was one of the best horse of the 2000s and a worthy inductee to the Hall of Fame in 2010. He attributed Point Given's fifth-place finish in the Derby to the combination of a foot infection and a very firm track at Churchill Downs. On a deeper track with more cushion, the foot did not bother the colt and trainer Bob Baffert remembered being very confident. "He's the best one I've ever led over for the Belmont", he said in 2010. "I knew he'd handle the distance. They can either go that far or they can't. You can't train that into them."

One week before the Belmont, Point Given's "mischievous" antics gave cause for concern when he injured himself in his stall. He suffered a cut over the eye, then the medication made him start acting colicky so Baffert withheld his hay to avoid making the stomach problems worse. The colt reacted by crawling under the webbing in his stall, gashing himself in the side in the process. He was briefly loose from his stall, but was then caught by the grooms.

Eight other horses entered the race. Point Given's main rivals were considered to be Derby winner Monarchos and Preakness runner-up A P Valentine. A P Valentine had won two of two starts at Belmont Park including the Champagne Stakes, in which he had defeated Point Given.

The attendance was 73,857, the highest for the Belmont when a Triple Crown was not at stake.

== Race description ==
Point Given broke well and settled in third place just behind the early leaders. After the first half-mile went in a reasonable 48 seconds, Point Given picked up the pace slightly and moved to the lead. He continued to draw away, encouraged by Stevens who remembered being run down late with Silver Charm in a previous running of the race. Point Given won by 12 1/4 lengths and finished in 2:26.56, equal to the fourth fastest Belmont ever. "He actually was idling with me a little and I thought somebody had to be coming," said Stevens. "I didn't know how far in front I was at the eighth pole and I didn't care. I knew he was going to get a rest afterward, and it was important for everybody to see how good he is."

His connections had mixed emotions about the win. "I'm always going to be bittersweet about these two victories without a victory in the Kentucky Derby," Stevens said. "I'm not going to get greedy, but I feel like he's a champion and should have a Triple Crown next to his name."

A P Valentine finished second, 3/4 lengths ahead of Monarchos. His trainer Nick Zito said, "My horse ran his heart out again, but that other horse is in another zone."

== Chart ==
| Finish | Program Number | Horse | Margin | Jockey | Trainer | Post Time Odds | Winnings |
|---|---|---|---|---|---|---|---|
| 1 | 9 | Point Given | 12 1/4 | Gary Stevens | Bob Baffert | 1.30 | $600,000 |
| 2 | 8 | A P Valentine | 3/4 | Victor Espinoza | Nicholas Zito | 5.90 | $200,000 |
| 3 | 5 | Monarchos | 1 | Jorge Chavez | John Ward Jr. | 5.00 | $110,000 |
| 4 | 3 | Dollar Bill | 2 1/2 | Pat Day | Dallas Stewart | 6.80 | $60,000 |
| 5 | 1 | Invisible Ink | 7 1/2 | John Velazquez | Todd Pletcher | 10.10 | $30,000 |
| 6 | 4 | Thunder Blitz | 5 3/4 | Jerry Bailey | Josepht Orseno | 12.70 | |
| 7 | 6 | Buckle Down Ben | 15 1/2 | Corey Nakatani | D. Wayne Lukas | 28.75 | |
| 8 | 2 | Balto Star | 28 3/4 | Chris McCarron | Todd Pletcher | 12.00 | |
| 9 | 7 | Dr Greenfield | | Edgar Prado | Gerald Butler | 19.80 | |

Source: Equibase
Times: 1/4 — 0:23.95; 1/2 — 0:48.00; 3/4 — 1:11.78; mile — 1:35.56; 1 1/4 — 2:00.75; final — 2:26.56.
Fractional Splits: (:23.95) (:24.05) (:23.78) (:23.78) (:25.00) (:25.80)

== Payout ==
The 135th Belmont Payout Schedule

| Program Number | Horse Name | Win | Place | Show |
|---|---|---|---|---|
| 9 | Point Given | $4.70 | $3.70 | $3.00 |
| 8 | A P Valentine | - | $5.00 | $3.90 |
| 5 | Monarchos | - | - | $4.20 |

- $2 Exacta (9-8): $20.60
- $2 Trifecta (9-8-5): $76.00
- $2 Superfecta (9-8-5-3): $183.50

== See also ==
- 2001 Kentucky Derby
- 2001 Preakness Stakes
