= Sam F. Davis Stakes =

American Thoroughbred horse race

- Class: Listed
- Location: Tampa Bay Downs; Oldsmar, Florida
- Inaugurated: 1981
- Race type: Thoroughbred – Flat racing

Race information
- Distance: 1 1/16 miles
- Surface: Dirt
- Track: Left-handed
- Qualification: Three-year-olds
- Weight: 124 lbs with allowances
- Purse: $250,000 (since 2012)

The Sam F. Davis Stakes is a Listed American Thoroughbred horse race for three years old horses over the distance of 1 1/16 miles on the dirt scheduled annually in February at Tampa Bay Downs racetrack in Oldsmar, Florida. The event currently carries a purse of $250,000.

== History ==
The event was named after the industrialist Sam F. Davis who in 1972 became President of the Florida Downs and Turf Club and worked to make the track successful. Davis retired in 1980 with the track renaming itself to Tampa Bay Downs.

The following year the Turf Club inaugurated the event on 28 February 1981 in honor of Sam F. Davis over the distance of one mile and seventy yards with the Robert E. Van Worp Jr. owned and the Robert E. Van Worp Sr. trained Croziers Ace defeating eight other starters with a winning margin of 2 1/2 lengths in a time of 1:45 2/5. Two of the starters, Ironical and Jealous Count fell when they were impeded by the second-placed finisher Rightorwron who was disqualified and placed last.

In 1982 the distance of the event was increased to 1 1/16 miles. The event was run in split divisions in 1984 with both winners shipping in from Miami. In 1985 the distance of the event was deceased to a seven furlong sprint before reverting to the 1 1/16 miles the following year.

From 1986 until 1995 the Breeders' Cup offered incentives for horses nominated to the Breeders' Cup that ran in the event and this reflected in the name of the event.

The scheduling of the Sam F. Davis has made it a logical prep race for the Grade III Tampa Bay Derby which is usually held one month after. In 1987 the winner of the event, Phantom Jet proceeded to win the Tampa Bay Derby.

The event was classified Listed for the first time in 2004 and was upgraded to Grade III in 2009 which headlines Tampa Bay Downs' Festival Preview Day.

Since 2013 the event has been part of the Road to the Kentucky Derby and frequently produces starters in that race.

In 2025 the event was downgraded by the Thoroughbred Owners and Breeders Association to Listed status.

== Records ==
Speed record:

- 1:42.27 – John Hancock (2025)

Largest Winning Margin:

- 6 3/4 lengths – San Gennaro (1999)

Most wins by a jockey:

- 4 – John R. Velazquez (2006, 2007, 2010, 2016)

Most wins by a trainer:

- 8 – Todd A. Pletcher (2006, 2007, 2010, 2011, 2014, 2016, 2023, 2026)

Most wins by an owner:

- 6 – WinStar Farm (2006, 2007, 2010, 2011, 2014, 2025)

Sam F. Davis Stakes – Tampa Bay Derby double:

- Phantom Jet (1987), Speedy Cure (1991), Marco Bay (1993), Thundering Storm (1996), Burning Roma (2001), Destin (2016), Classic Causeway (2022)

== Winners ==
Year	Winner	Jockey	Trainer	Owner	Distance	Time	Purse	Grade	Ref
2026	Renegade	Irad Ortiz Jr.	Todd A. Pletcher	Robert & Lawana Low & Repole Stable	1 1/16 miles	1:43.54	$210,000	Listed	
2025	John Hancock	Flavien Prat	Brad H. Cox	China Horse Club & WinStar Farm	1 1/16 miles	1:42.27	$200,000	Listed	
2024	No More Time	Paco Lopez	Jose D'Angelo	Morplay Racing	1 1/16 miles	1:43.26	$200,000	III	
2023	Litigate	Luis Saez	Todd A. Pletcher	Centennial Farms	1 1/16 miles	1:44.83	$200,000	III	
2022	Classic Causeway	Irad Ortiz Jr.	Brian A. Lynch	Kentucky West Racing & Clarke M. Cooper	1 1/16 miles	1:42.80	$200,000	III	
2021	Candy Man Rocket	Junior Alvarado	William I. Mott	Frank Fletcher Racing Operations	1 1/16 miles	1:44.30	$200,000	III	
2020	Sole Volante	Luca Panici	Patrick L. Biancone	Reeves Thoroughbred Racing, Andie Biancone, & Limelight Stables	1 1/16 miles	1:42.60	$200,000	III	
2019	Well Defined	Pablo Morales	Kathleen O'Connell	Stonehedge	1 1/16 miles	1:42.70	$250,000	III	
2018	Flameaway	Jose Lezcano	Mark E. Casse	John C. Oxley	1 1/16 miles	1:42.44	$200,000	III	
2017	McCraken	Brian Hernandez Jr.	Ian R. Wilkes	Whitham Thoroughbreds	1 1/16 miles	1:42.45	$200,000	III	
2016	Destin	John R. Velazquez	Todd A. Pletcher	Twin Creeks Racing Stables	1 1/16 miles	1:43.67	$200,000	III	
2015	Ocean Knight	Irad Ortiz Jr.	Kiaran P. McLaughlin	Stonestreet Stables	1 1/16 miles	1.43.74	$201,500	III	
2014	Vinceremos	Edgar S. Prado	Todd A. Pletcher	WinStar Farm & Twin Creeks Racing Stables	1 1/16 miles	1:47.34	$200,000	III	
2013	Falling Sky	Jose L. Espinoza	John P. Terranova II	Newtown Anner Stud	1 1/16 miles	1:44.79	$202,500	III	
2012	Battle Hardened	Julien R. Leparoux	Eddie Kenneally	Michael Tabor & Mrs. John Magnier	1 1/16 miles	1:44.58	$200,000	III	
2011	Brethren	Ramon A. Dominguez	Todd A. Pletcher	WinStar Farm	1 1/16 miles	1:45.07	$207,500	III	
2010	Rule	John R. Velazquez	Todd A. Pletcher	WinStar Farm	1 1/16 miles	1:44.15	$200,000	III	
2009	General Quarters	James Lopez	Mark L. Miller	Thomas R. McCarthy	1 1/16 miles	1:43.54	$221,000	III	
2008	Fierce Wind	Cornelio Velasquez	Nicholas P. Zito	Four Roses Thoroughbreds	1 1/16 miles	1:44.13	$200,000	Listed	
2007	Any Given Saturday	John R. Velazquez	Todd A. Pletcher	WinStar Farm	1 1/16 miles	1:44.27	$146,000	Listed	
2006	Bluegrass Cat	John R. Velazquez	Todd A. Pletcher	WinStar Farm	1 1/16 miles	1:44.17	$121,000	Listed	
2005	Andromeda's Hero	Rafael Bejarano	Nicholas P. Zito	Robert V. LaPenta	1 1/16 miles	1:46.63	$100,000	Listed	
2004	Kaufy Mate	Ramsey Zimmerman	Kirk Ziadie	Gregory Kaufman	1 1/16 miles	1:44.60	$100,000	Listed	
2003	White Buck	Roger I. Velez	Jerry P. Paradise	Olga Paradise	1 1/16 miles	1:45.47	$50,000		
2002	Bunk N Ted	Derek C. Bell	Kenneth B. Wirth	Danny Hutt	1 1/16 miles	1:49.86	$50,000		
2001	§ Burning Roma	Juan Umana	Heather A. Giglio	Harold L. Queen	1 1/16 miles	1:45.20	$50,000		
2000	Go Lib Go	Robert C. Landry	Kenneth G. McPeek	Raymond H. Cottrell	1 1/16 miles	1:44.84	$35,000		
1999	San Gennaro	Pedro A. Rodriguez	Richard J. Ciardullo Jr.	Richard J. Ciardullo Sr.	1 1/16 miles	1:45.54	$27,675		
1998	Dabney Carr	Kevin Whitley	Elizabeth Zemp-Everard	My Jolee Stable, Patrick & Elizabeth Everard	1 1/16 miles	1:46.20	$28,075		
1997	Wilt the Tilt	Luis Antonio Gonzalez	Cyndi Smith	Michael Douglas Smith	1 1/16 miles	1:46.00	$28,475		
1996	Thundering Storm	Jorge A. Guerra	Don R. Rice	Deborrah Artz	1 1/16 miles	1:47.60	$25,000		
1995	Akiba	Santos Noe Chavez	Sonny Hine	Scott Savin	1 1/16 miles	1:47.40	$43,925		
1994	Parental Pressure	Jack M. Lauzon	Fred H. Loschke	Hammer Kopf Farm, J. Corrente & Partners	1 1/16 miles	1:47.40	$52,850		
1993	Marco Bay	Ronald Dale Allen Jr.	Sarah A. Lundy	Jay Shaw	1 1/16 miles	1:45.60	$52,175		
1992	Randy	Herson A. Sanchez	Angel Raphael Rosado	Martin Haft	1 1/16 miles	1:46.40	$51,050		
1991	§ Speedy Cure	Ricardo D. Lopez	Harvey Culp	Susan B. Fisher	1 1/16 miles	1:47.80	$31,300		
1990	Fiery Best	Manuel A. Santos	Jose A. Mendez	Fred Berens & Solomon Garazi	1 1/16 miles	1:46.00	$53,750		
1989	Papa Leonard	Robert Woodhouse	Joseph I. Losen	Joseph I. Losen	1 1/16 miles	1:46.80	$37,100		
1988	House Account	Dean Kutz	Thomas F. Proctor	Glen Hill Farm	1 1/16 miles	1:46.80	$20,100		
1987	Phantom Jet	K. Keith Allen	Philip A. Gleaves	Aisco Stable	1 1/16 miles	1:45.20	$17,760		
1986	Fellow's Lady	Ramon Sagardia	Charles Miranda	Anthony Fernandez	1 1/16 miles	1:47.40	$22,000		
1985	Tamao's Gray	Ruben A. Hernandez	Curtis N. Spencer	A.J.W. Stable	7 furlongs	1:27.00	$19,800		
1984	Morning Bob	Miguel A. Rivera	Woodford C. Stephens	Brushwood Stable	1 1/16 miles	1:47.00	$9,250		Division 1
1984	D. White	Jose A. Velez Jr.	Frank A. Alexander	Frank A. Alexander & Kevin Miller	1 1/16 miles	1:46.40	$9,150		Division 2
1983	Saverton	Kevin Wirth	Glenn S. Wismer	Orville & Mary M. Zimmerman	1 1/16 miles	1:47.40	$12,400		
1982	Tampa Bay Buck	Heriberto Rivera Jr.	Arnold W. Fink	John Spencer	1 1/16 miles	1:47.80	$11,830		
1981	Croziers Ace	Brian L. Mills	Robert E. Van Worp Sr.	Robert E. Van Worp Jr.	1 mile & 70 yards	1:45.40	$17,145		

Notes:
§ Ran as an entry

== See also ==
- Road to the Kentucky Derby
- List of American and Canadian Graded races
