= A P Valentine =

American-bred Thoroughbred racehorse

- Sire: A.P. Indy
- Grandsire: Seattle Slew
- Dam: Twenty Eight Carat
- Damsire: Alydar
- Sex: Stallion
- Foaled: 1998
- Country: United States
- Colour: Bay
- Breeder: William S. Kilroy
- Owner: Celtic Pride Stable
- Trainer: Nick Zito
- Record: 13:3–3–2
- Earnings: $864,170

Major wins
- Champagne Stakes (2000); American Classic Race placing: Preakness Stakes (2001, 2nd); Belmont Stakes (2001, 2nd)
- Last updated on August 26th 2018

A P Valentine (February 14, 1998 – September 1, 2018) was a Grade I-winning Thoroughbred racehorse sired by A.P. Indy out of an Alydar mare, Twenty Eight Carat. His name was derived by splicing the beginning of his sire's name "A P" with the holiday that he was born on, "Valentine's Day".

== Two-year-old career ==
Trained by Nick Zito and owned by Celtic Pride Stable, a partnership led by Rick Pitino, A P Valentine began his racing career at Saratoga with a third-place finish in a maiden special weight. In his next start at Belmont, he broke his maiden race in a dominant performance winning by over four lengths.

Zito was so impressed by A P Valentine's performance in breaking his maiden, that he entered him in the Grade I Champagne Stakes at Belmont. The horse did not disappoint, squeezing by eventual American Horse of the Year, Point Given on the rail and pulling away to win by 1-3/4 lengths.

Following the Champagne, Coolmore purchased the breeding rights to AP Valentine for $15.1 million.

He made his final start of 2000 in the Breeders' Cup Juvenile at Churchill Downs. While he went off as the favorite, he was never a factor and came home in last place.

== Three-year-old career ==
He began his three-year-old campaign at Gulfstream where he was upset in an allowance race. In his next start, A P Valentine managed not only to win but to break the track record for 1.1875 miles (1.9111 km) at Hialeah, romping by 3-3/4 lengths in an optional claimer. For A P Valentine, that would be the last victory of his career that spanned three years.

In his three-year-old stakes debut in the Blue Grass Stakes at Keeneland Race Course, he was not a factor and ran fifth. He turned in yet another lackluster performance in the Kentucky Derby before regaining the form he showed as a two-year-old with runner-up performances to Point Given in both the Preakness Stakes and the Belmont Stakes.

In the Preakness Stakes, he was a lukewarm 10–1 fourth choice in the morning line. A P Valentine faced a premium field of stakes winners that included Kentucky Derby Winner Monarchos, eventual Horse-of-the-Year Point Given, Derby runner-up Invisible Ink, multi-millionaire Congaree, Blue Grass Stakes runner-up Dollar Bill and local favorite Richly Blended. At the start of the race he was shuffled back by jockey Victor Espinoza as they passed the grandstand the first time around. Richly Blended and Congaree led most of the race. He raced seventh in a field of eleven during most of the early race. With 3 1/2 furlongs to go, A P Valentine split horses weaving his way through traffic while Point Given and Monarchos looped the field wide. At the top of the stretch Point Given took the lead and widened it to win by two lengths. A P Valentine bore down and was able to outfinish Congaree down the lane by a half length to win second-place money of $200,000. Derby winner Monarchos faded to be no factor.

In the summer of 2001, he ran in the Jim Dandy Stakes, finishing fourth after losing a battle with Congaree for the show position. He followed with another fourth in the Travers Stakes.

AP Valentine made one final start in his career, the Jockey Club Gold Cup, a race that would be his only career race against older horses. After finishing in sixth, 29.5 lengths behind the winner, AP Valentine was retired. He finished his career with a record of three wins, three places and two shows in 13 starts and $864,170 in earnings.

== Retirement ==
Following his retirement, he was shipped to Coolmore's Ashford Stud in Versailles, Kentucky, where he stood for a fee of $15,000.

In his first year at stud, A P Valentine was discovered to have fertility issues, which led to Coolmore retiring him from stud duty. However, after working with a fertility specialist, he was put back into stud duty and sent to Cedar Creek Farm in Brenham, Texas.

Finally, in July 2006, Higgie, a two-year-old A P Valentine filly out of a mare named Aces, won a five-furlong maiden claimer at Monmouth Park.

A P Valentine stood at Cedar Creek with a stud fee of $5,000 until 2018, when he was moved to Old Friends Equine in Georgetown, Kentucky. He was euthanized due to complications from colic on September 1, 2018.

== Races ==
Finish	Race	Distance	Track	Date
6th	Jockey Club Gold Cup	One and One-Quarter Miles	Belmont Park	October 4, 2001
4th	Travers Stakes	One and One-Quarter Miles	Saratoga Race Course	August 25, 2001
4th	Jim Dandy Stakes	One and One-Eight Miles	Saratoga Race Course	August 4, 2001
2nd	Belmont Stakes	One and One-Half Miles	Belmont Park	June 9, 2001
2nd	Preakness Stakes	One and Three-Sixteenths Miles	Pimlico Race Course	May 19, 2001
7th	Kentucky Derby	One and One-Quarter Miles	Churchill Downs	May 5, 2001
5th	Blue Grass Stakes	One and One-Eighth Miles	Keeneland Race Course	April 21, 2001
1st	Allowance Optional Claiming	One and One-Sixteenth Miles	Hialeah Park	March 24, 2001
3rd	Allowance	Seven Furlongs	Gulfstream Park	February 17, 2001
14th	Breeders' Cup Juvenile	One and One-Sixteenth Miles	Churchill Downs	November 4, 2000
1st	Champagne Stakes	One and One-Sixteenth Miles	Saratoga Race Course	October 14, 2000
1st	Maiden Special Weight		Belmont Park	September 23, 2000
3rd	Maiden Special Weight		Saratoga Race Course	September 4, 2000

== Breeding ==
Pedigree of A P Valentine
Sire A.P. Indy	Seattle Slew	Bold Reasoning	Boldnesian
Sire A.P. Indy	Seattle Slew	Bold Reasoning	Reason to Earn
Sire A.P. Indy	Seattle Slew	My Charmer	Poker
Sire A.P. Indy	Seattle Slew	My Charmer	Fair Charmer
Sire A.P. Indy	Weekend Surprise	Secretariat	Bold Ruler
Sire A.P. Indy	Weekend Surprise	Secretariat	Somethingroyal
Sire A.P. Indy	Weekend Surprise	Lassie Dear	Buckpasser
Sire A.P. Indy	Weekend Surprise	Lassie Dear	Gay Missile
Dam Twenty Eight Carat	Alydar	Raise a Native	Native Dancer
Dam Twenty Eight Carat	Alydar	Raise a Native	Raise You
Dam Twenty Eight Carat	Alydar	Sweet Tooth	On-and-On
Dam Twenty Eight Carat	Alydar	Sweet Tooth	Plum Cake
Dam Twenty Eight Carat	Voodoo Dance	Stage Door Johnny	Prince John
Dam Twenty Eight Carat	Voodoo Dance	Stage Door Johnny	Peroxide Blonde
Dam Twenty Eight Carat	Voodoo Dance	Witch Dance	Northern Dancer
Dam Twenty Eight Carat	Voodoo Dance	Witch Dance	Shama
