= Thomas R. McCarthy =

American racehorse owner and trainer

Tom McCarthy
Personal information
- Born: November 30, 1933 New London, Connecticut
- Died: July 21, 2016 (aged 82) Louisville, Kentucky
- Resting place: Calvary Cemetery, Louisville, Kentucky
- Occupations: Educator, Racehorse trainer

Horse racing career
- Sport: Horse racing
- Career wins: 29

Major racing wins
- Sam F. Davis Stakes (2009); Blue Grass Stakes (2009); Turf Classic Stakes (2010)

Racing awards
- Norwich Native Son Award 2010

Significant horses
- General Quarters, Brink of War, Breaking Free
- Updated on October 2, 2020

Thomas Rutherford McCarthy (November 30, 1933 – July 21, 2016) was an American thoroughbred racehorse owner and trainer from Louisville, Kentucky, best known for the 2009 Blue Grass Stakes winner and Kentucky Derby runner, General Quarters. From a racing family, his grandfather was a jockey in Ireland and both his father and uncle trained horses at racetracks in New England.

McCarthy had been a racehorse owner and sometimes trainer since 1960 and was unique in the racing industry in that he did all the work of maintaining and conditioning his horses. On May 30, 2008, McCarthy claimed General Quarters for $20,000 out of a maiden race at Churchill Downs. He would later turn down million dollar offers for the horse, telling the TVG Network interviewer "you don't sell a dream."

He graduated from Union College, Barbourville KY and from the University of Louisville. Upon receiving a degree in biology, he served in the U.S. Army. He then spent 34 years in the Jefferson County School Public System in Louisville as a science teacher, counselor and principal at Seneca High School, Durrett and Valley High Schools. Upon retirement, he returned to training thoroughbred horses; he worked as a trainer until May, 2016.

His high school was Norwich (CT) Free Academy, class of 1952. He later received the Norwich Native Son Award in 2010.

McCarthy died on July 21, 2016, in Louisville, Kentucky, due to melanoma.
