= General Quarters (horse) =

American-bred Thoroughbred racehorse

- Sire: Sky Mesa
- Grandsire: Pulpit
- Dam: Ecology
- Damsire: Unbridled's Song
- Sex: Stallion
- Foaled: 2006
- Country: United States
- Colour: Gray
- Breeder: Mr. & Mrs. R. David Randal
- Owner: 1) Ken & Sarah Ramsey; 2) Thomas R. McCarthy
- Trainer: 1) Wesley A. Ward; 2) Thomas R. McCarthy
- Record: 21: 4-7-2
- Earnings: US$1,165,260 (ongoing)

Major wins
- Sam F. Davis Stakes (2009); Blue Grass Stakes (2009); Turf Classic Stakes (2010)

General Quarters (foaled March 7, 2006 in Kentucky) is an American Thoroughbred racehorse who was a contender for the 2009 U.S. Triple Crown. He was sired by Sky Mesa, winner of the 2002 Grade I Hopeful Stakes, a son of the 1997 Blue Grass Stakes winner, Pulpit. His dam is Ecology, a daughter of the 1995 Breeders' Cup Juvenile winner, Unbridled's Song.

He was owned and trained by 75-year-old Tom McCarthy, a retired high school teacher and principal. On May 30, 2008, McCarthy claimed General Quarters, his only horse, for $20,000 out of a maiden race at Churchill Downs.

== Racing career ==
Two year old season:
General Quarters made seven starts as a two-year-old. He won a maiden claiming race his first time out and was claimed by 75-year-old owner-trainer Tom McCarthy, a retired high school teacher and principal from Louisville, Kentucky. After that, the colt showed limited promise until his last race of 2008 when he earned his best stakes race result with a second-place finish in the Inaugural Stakes at Tampa Bay Downs.
Three year old season:
On February 14, 2009, General Quarters won the Sam F. Davis Stakes at Tampa Bay Downs . At Keeneland Race Course on April 11, the colt won the most important race of his career: the Grade I Blue Grass Stakes. His win qualified him for the May 2 Kentucky Derby, the first leg of the U.S. Triple Crown. Ridden by French jockey, Julien Leparoux, he finished tenth. He was then entered into the Preakness Stakes at Pimlico Downs, again with Leparoux aboard, and finished ninth. Following the race General Quarters underwent surgery to remove a bone chip, and returned to the races seven months later to finish second in an allowance race.
Four year old season:
On May 1, 2010, General Quarters won the Woodford Reserve Turf Classic, beating Court Vision, before running third in the Stephen Foster Handicap and then unplaced in two starts at Arlington Park.

=== Five year old season ===
General Quarters started six times in 2011 without a win, though he did place second in the Grade II Kentucky Cup Stakes at Turfway. He was retired at the end of the year with a total record of 27 starts, four wins, nine seconds, and two thirds, and total winnings of $1,226,655.

== Retirement ==
General Quarters began his stud career at HallMarc Stallions in Florida in 2012 before moving to Crestwood farm in Kentucky in 2014. He is the sire of blacktype earner Mia Torri, who ran second in the 2016 Grade III Charles Town Oaks, as well as General McGooby, who won the Not Surprising Stakes at Gulfstream in 2017. In November 2016, General Quarters was sold to Omer Aydin to continue his stud career in Turkey. Speaking of his purchase, Aydin said:

“I think this horse will work in Turkey because he won races both on the dirt and the turf, so we are hoping to benefit from him. The American horse has a big influence on the improvement of racehorses. I like European racing, actually, but I believe U.S. Thoroughbreds are the best.”

Of General Quarters' foals born before his relocation, the most successful is Signalman, winner of the 2018 GII Kentucky Jockey Club Stakes. Signalman, trained by Kenny McPeek, also ran second in the GI Breeder's Futurity and third in the GI Breeder's Cup Juvenile in 2018. As of June 2019, Signalman has added a third in the Blue Grass Stakes and second in the Matt Winn Stakes to his record.
