= Blue Grass Stakes =

Grade I thoroughbred horse race

Toyota Blue Grass Stakes
- Class: Grade I
- Location: Keeneland Race Course, Lexington, Kentucky, USA
- Inaugurated: 1911
- Race type: Thoroughbred
- Website: www.drf.com/blue-grass-stakes/

Race information
- Distance: 1 1/8 miles (9 Furlongs)
- Surface: dirt
- Track: Left-handed
- Qualification: 3-year-old
- Weight: 123 lbs (55.8 kg)
- Purse: $1,250,000 (since 2025)

The Blue Grass Stakes, currently the Toyota Blue Grass Stakes due to sponsorship by the Toyota Motor Corporation, is a horse race for 3-year-old Thoroughbreds held annually in April at Keeneland Racecourse in Lexington, Kentucky. The race is run at 1 1/8 miles on the dirt and currently offers a purse of $1,250,000. The Blue Grass Stakes was a Grade I event from 1974 (when grading was first introduced) through 1989 and again from 1999 to 2016. It was a Grade II event from 2017 to 2021, and returned to a Grade I in 2022.

It was named for the Bluegrass region of Kentucky, characterized by grass having bluish-green culms, which is known as the "heart" of the thoroughbred racing industry.

First run at the Lexington Race Course in 1911, the Blue Grass has, from its inception, served as an important prep for the Kentucky Derby. At the Lexington Association track, the Blue Grass was staged from 1911 through 1914 and from 1919 through 1926. The race was revived at Keeneland in the spring of 1937. In 1943–1944, the Blue Grass was renewed as a part of the Keeneland-at-Churchill Downs meeting. In 1945, the Blue Grass was run as part of the Churchill Downs meeting. Today it is part of the Keeneland program.

From 2007 to 2014, the race was held on a synthetic "all-weather" surface. Otherwise, it has been run on a dirt surface.

== Records (Keeneland) ==
Fastest Time: (at Current Distance of 1 1/8 miles)

- 1:47.20 – Skip Away (1996)

Most wins by an owner

- 6 – Calumet Farm (1938, 1943, 1947, 1948, 1968, 1978)

Most wins by a jockey

- 6 – Bill Shoemaker (1959, 1960, 1965, 1966, 1969, 1982)

Most wins by a trainer:

- 4 – Todd A. Pletcher (2005, 2008, 2015, 2023)

== Winners ==
Year	Winner	Jockey	Trainer	Owner	Distance	Time	Gr.
2026	Further Ado	Irad Ortiz Jr.	Brad H. Cox	Spendthrift Farm LLC	1-1/8	1:49.58	I
2025	Burnham Square	Brian Hernandez Jr.	Ian R. Wilkes	Whitham Thoroughbreds LLC	1-1/8	1:51.33	I
2024	Sierra Leone	Tyler Gaffalione	Chad C. Brown	Derrick Smith, Mrs. John Magnier, Michael Tabor, Westerburg, Brook T. Smith & Peter Brant	1-1/8	1:50.08	I
2023	Tapit Trice	Luis Saez	Todd A. Pletcher	Whisper Hill Farm & Gainesway Stable	1-1/8	1:50.00	I
2022	Zandon	Flavien Prat	Chad C. Brown	Jeff Drown	1-1/8	1:50.35	I
2021	Essential Quality	Luis Saez	Brad H. Cox	Godolphin	1-1/8	1:48.50	II
2020	Art Collector	Brian Hernandez Jr.	Thomas Drury Jr.	Bruce Lunsford	1-1/8	1:48.11	II
2019	Vekoma	Javier Castellano	George Weaver	R.A. Hill Stable & Gatsas Stables	1-1/8	1:50.93	II
2018	Good Magic	José Ortiz	Chad C. Brown	eFive Racing Thoroughbreds & Stonestreet Stables	1-1/8	1:50.18	II
2017	Irap	Julien Leparoux	Doug O'Neill	Reddam Racing LLC	1-1/8	1:50.39	II
2016	Brody's Cause	Luis Saez	Dale L. Romans	Albaugh Family Stable	1-1/8	1:50.20	I
2015	Carpe Diem	John R. Velazquez	Todd A. Pletcher	WinStar Farm & Stonestreet Stables	1-1/8	1:49.77	I
2014	Dance With Fate	Corey S. Nakatani	Peter Eurton	Sharon Alesia, Bran Jam Stable, Ciaglia Racing	1-1/8	1:50.06	I
2013	Java's War	Julien Leparoux	Kenneth G. McPeek	Charles E. Fipke	1-1/8	1:50.27	I
2012	Dullahan	Kent Desormeaux	Dale Romans	Donegal Racing	1-1/8	1:47.94	I
2011	Brilliant Speed	Joel Rosario	Thomas Albertrani	Live Oak Plantation	1-1/8	1:50.92	I
2010	Stately Victor	Alan Garcia	Michael J. Maker	Thomas F. & Jack Conway	1-1/8	1:48.69	I
2009	General Quarters	Eibar Coa	Thomas R. McCarthy	Thomas R. McCarthy	1-1/8	1:49.26	I
2008	Monba	Edgar Prado	Todd A. Pletcher	Starlight Racing	1-1/8	1:49.71	I
2007	Dominican	Rafael Bejarano	Darrin Miller	Silverton Hill LLC	1-1/8	1:51.33	I
2006	Sinister Minister	Garrett Gomez	Bob Baffert	Mercedes Stable, Lanni Family Trust & Bernard C. Schiappa	1-1/8	1:48.85	I
2005	Bandini	John R. Velazquez	Todd A. Pletcher	Michael Tabor	1-1/8	1:48.85	I
2004	The Cliff's Edge	Shane Sellers	Nick Zito	Robert V. LaPenta	1-1/8	1:49.42	I
2003	Peace Rules	Edgar Prado	Robert J. Frankel	Edmund A. Gann	1-1/8	1:51.73	I
2002	Harlan's Holiday	Edgar Prado	Ken McPeek	Starlight Stable	1-1/8	1:51.51	I
2001	Millennium Wind	Laffit Pincay Jr.	David Hofmans	David & Jill Heerensperger	1-1/8	1:48.32	I
2000	High Yield	Pat Day	D. Wayne Lukas	Michael Tabor, Robert B. Lewis, Sue Magnier	1-1/8	1:48.60	I
1999	Menifee	Pat Day	W. Elliott Walden	Arthur B. Hancock III & James H. Stone	1-1/8	1:48.60	I
1998	Halory Hunter	Gary Stevens	Nick Zito	Celtic Pride Stable	1-1/8	1:47.80	II
1997	Pulpit	Shane Sellers	Frank L. Brothers	Claiborne Farm	1-1/8	1:49.80	II
1996	Skip Away	Shane Sellers	Sonny Hine	Carolyn Hine	1-1/8	1:47.20	II
1995	Wild Syn	Randy Romero	Thomas K. Arnemann	Jurgen K. Arnemann	1-1/8	1:49.20	II
1994	Holy Bull	Mike E. Smith	Warren A. Croll Jr.	Warren A. Croll Jr.	1-1/8	1:50.00	II
1993	Prairie Bayou	Mike E. Smith	Tom Bohannan	Loblolly Stable	1-1/8	1:49.60	II
1992	Pistols and Roses	Jacinto Vásquez	George Gianos	Willis Family Stables	1-1/8	1:49.00	II
1991	Strike the Gold	Chris Antley	Nick Zito	BCC Stable	1-1/8	1:48.40	II
1990	Summer Squall	Pat Day	Neil J. Howard	Dogwood Stable	1-1/8	1:48.60	II
1989	Western Playboy	Randy Romero	Harvey L. Vanier	Nancy A. Vanier & Ray Roncari	1-1/8	1:51.20	I
1988	Granacus	Jacinto Vásquez	Pat Collins	Steve A. Stavro	1-1/8	1:52.20	I
1987	War	Herb McCauley	D. Wayne Lukas	Tom Gentry	1-1/8	1:48.40	I
1986	Bachelor Beau	Larry Melancon	Philip Hauswald	Richard A. Waterfield & James B. Tafel	1-1/8	1:51.20	I
1985	Chief's Crown	Don MacBeth	Roger Laurin	Star Crown Stable	1-1/8	1:47.60	I
1984	Taylor's Special	Pat Day	William I. Mott	William F. Lucas	1-1/8	1:52.20	I
1983	Play Fellow	Jean Cruguet	Harvey L. Vanier	Nancy A. Vanier, Carl Lauer, Robert Victor	1-1/8	1:49.40	I
1982	Linkage	Bill Shoemaker	Henry S. Clark	Christiana Stable	1-1/8	1:48.00	I
1981	Proud Appeal	Jeffrey Fell	Stanley M. Hough	Gainesway Farm et al.	1-1/8	1:51.40	I
1980	Rockhill Native	John Oldham	Herbert K. Stevens	Harry A. Oak	1-1/8	1:50.00	I
1979	Spectacular Bid	Ronnie Franklin	Bud Delp	Hawksworth Farm	1-1/8	1:50.00	I
1978	Alydar	Jorge Velásquez	John M. Veitch	Calumet Farm	1-1/8	1:49.60	I
1977	For the Moment	Ángel Cordero Jr.	LeRoy Jolley	Gerald Robins	1-1/8	1:50.20	I
1976	Honest Pleasure	Braulio Baeza	LeRoy Jolley	Bertram R. Firestone	1-1/8	1:49.40	I
1975	Master Derby	Darrel McHargue	Smiley Adams	Golden Chance Farm	1-1/8	1:49.00	I
1974	Judger	Laffit Pincay, Jr.	Woody Stephens	Seth W. Hancock	1-1/8	1:49.20	I
1973	My Gallant	Ángel Cordero Jr.	Lou Goldfine	Arthur I. Appleton	1-1/8	1:49.60	
1972	Riva Ridge	Ron Turcotte	Lucien Laurin	Meadow Stable	1-1/8	1:49.60	
1971	Impetuosity	Eric Guerin	George Poole	Wendell P. Rosso	1-1/8	1:49.40	
1970	Dust Commander	Mike Manganello	Don Combs	Robert E. Lehmann	1-1/8	1:51.20	
1969	Arts and Letters	Bill Shoemaker	J. Elliott Burch	Rokeby Stable	1-1/8	1:47.80	
1968	Forward Pass	Ismael Valenzuela	Henry Forrest	Calumet Farm	1-1/8	1:47.80	
1967	Diplomat Way	Johnny Sellers	John O. Meaux	Harvey Peltier Sr.	1-1/8	1:49.60	
1966	Abe's Hope	Bill Shoemaker	Del W. Carroll	Grand Prix Stable	1-1/8	1:49.20	
1965	Lucky Debonair	Bill Shoemaker	Frank Catrone	Ada L. Rice	1-1/8	1:49.00	
1964	Northern Dancer	Bill Hartack	Horatio Luro	Windfields Farm	1-1/8	1:49.80	
1963	Chateaugay	Braulio Baeza	James P. Conway	Darby Dan Farm	1-1/8	1:48.00	
1962	Ridan	Manuel Ycaza	LeRoy Jolley	Moody Jolley, Ernest Woods, John L. Greer	1-1/8	1:47.60	
1961	Sherluck	Braulio Baeza	Harold Young	Jacob Sher	1-1/8	1:48.60	
1960	Tompion	Bill Shoemaker	Robert L. Wheeler	Cornelius Vanderbilt Whitney	1-1/8	1:48.60	
1959	Tomy Lee	Bill Shoemaker	Frank Childs	Fred Turner Jr.	1-1/8	1:48.60	
1958	Plion	David Erb	Tom Jolley	Edward Potter Jr.	1-1/8	1:52.80	
1957	Round Table	Ralph Neves	William Molter	Kerr Stable	1-1/8	1:47.40	
1956	Toby B.	Robert L. Baird	Robert E. Wingfield	Gene Van Deren & O.S. Deming	1-1/8	1:51.00	
1955	Racing Fool	Henry Moreno	Loyd Gentry Jr.	Cain Hoy Stable	1-1/8	1:51.80	
1954	Goyamo	Eddie Arcaro	Woody Stephens	Woodvale Farm	1-1/8	1:50.60	
1953	Correspondent	Eddie Arcaro	Wally Dunn	Mrs. Gordon Guiberson	1-1/8	1:49.00	
1952	Güshing Oil	Steve Brooks	Whitey Jansen	Sam E. Wilson Jr.	1-1/8	1:52.40	
1951	Mameluke	Raymond Adair	Sylvester Veitch	Cornelius Vanderbilt Whitney	1-1/8	1:54.40	
1951	Ruhe	Job Dean Jessop	Robert McGarvey	Jean Denemark	1-1/8	1:54.20	
1950	Mr. Trouble	Douglas Dodson	Sylvester Veitch	Cornelius Vanderbilt Whitney	1-1/8	1:50.40	
1949	Halt	Conn McCreary	Woody Stephens	Woodvale Farm	1-1/8	1:52.60	
1948	Coaltown	Newbold L. Pierson	Ben A. Jones	Calumet Farm	1-1/8	1:49.20	
1947	Faultless	Douglas Dodson	Ben A. Jones	Calumet Farm	1-1/8	1:51.20	
1946	Lord Boswell	Eddie Arcaro	James W. Smith	Maine Chance Farm	1-1/8	1:51.60	
1945	Darby Dieppe	Melvin Calvert	Charles Gentry	Mrs. W. Graham Lewis	1-1/8	1:53.40	
1944	Skytracer	Mike Cafferella	Frank J. Baker	Manuel B. Goff	1-1/8	1:52.60	
1943	Ocean Wave	Wendell Eads	Ben A. Jones	Calumet Farm	1-1/8	1:53.80	
1942	Shut Out	Eddie Arcaro	John M. Gaver Sr.	Greentree Stable	1-1/8	1:52.40	
1941	Our Boots	Conn McCreary	Steve Judge	Woodvale Farm	1-1/8	1:51.20	
1940	Bimelech	Fred A. Smith	Bill Hurley	Edward R. Bradley	1-1/8	1:51.00	
1939	Heather Broom	Basil James	Earl Sande	John Hay Whitney	1-1/8	1:54.20	
1938	Bull Lea	Irving Anderson	Frank J. Kearns	Calumet Farm	1-1/8	1:49.60	
1937	Fencing	Jack Westrope	Earl Sande	Maxwell Howard	1-1/8	1:57.20	

* 1951 – The race was made up of two heats. Sonic won the second heat but was disqualified and placed fourth.

== Winners of the Lexington Association Blue Grass Stakes ==
Winner	Winner	Jockey	Trainer	Owner	Distance (Miles)	Time
1926	Bubbling Over	Eddie Legere	Herbert J. Thompson	Idle Hour Stock Farm	1-1/8	1:49.60
1925	Step Along	Earl Pool	William Perkins	Frederick M. Grabner	1-1/8	1:51.60
1924	Altawood	Lawrence McDermott	G. Hamilton Keene	C. Bruce Head	1-1/8	1:51.80
1923	Bo McMillan	Danny Connelly	Louis Cahn	Thomas J. Pendergast	1-1/8	1:56.80
1922	Busy American	Newton Barrett	Herbert J. Thompson	Idle Hour Stock Farm	1-1/8	1:55.80
1921	Black Servant	Newton Barrett	Herbert J. Thompson	Idle Hour Stock Farm	1-1/8	1:54.60
1920	Peace Pennant	Mack Garner	Joseph S. Hawkins	William F. Polson	1-1/8	1:51.80
1919	Regalo	Frank Murphy	John C. Gallaher	Gallaher Bros.	1-1/8	1:51.60
1915–1918	No races					
1914	Bronzewing	John McCabe	Daniel Lehan	A. P. Humphrey, Jr.	1-1/8	1:51.80
1913	Foundation	Charles Peak	William McDaniel	Charles W. McKenna	1-1/8	1:51.40
1912	Sprite	Carroll H. Shilling	William H. Karrick	Harry K. Knapp	1-1/8	1:51.20
1911	Governor Gray	George Molesworth	James S. Everman	R. N. Smith & Co.	1-1/8	1.51.20

== See also ==
- Blue Grass Stakes "top three finishers" and starters
- Road to the Kentucky Derby
