= Millennium Wind =

American thoroughbred racehorse

- Sire: Cryptoclearance
- Grandsire: Fappiano
- Dam: Bali Babe
- Damsire: Drone
- Sex: Stallion
- Foaled: 1998
- Country: United States
- Color: Dark bay/brown
- Breeder: Parrish Hill Farm
- Owner: David & Jill Heerensperger
- Trainer: David E. Hofmans
- Record: 7:3-2-0
- Earnings: $789,920

Major wins
- Santa Catalina Stakes (2001); Blue Grass Stakes (2001)

Millennium Wind (foaled April 30, 1998) is an American Thoroughbred racehorse who won the 2001 Blue Grass Stakes.

== Career ==
Millennium Wind's first race was on November 18, 2000, at Hollywood Park, where he came in first. His next race was at the 2000 Los Alamitos Futurity, where he finished second.

He picked up his first graded stakes win on January 21, 2001, by winning the Santa Catalina Stakes. He then came in second on March 11, 2001 at the Louisiana Derby.

He then won the biggest race of his career, which turned out to be the last win of his career, by winning the 2001 Blue Grass Stakes.

He competed in the 2001 Kentucky Derby, coming in 11th, where he was injured. His last race was on November 2, 2001, where he came in 7th place. He was officially retired in May 2002.

== Death ==
Millennium Wind was euthanized on July 28, 2012.

== Pedigree ==
Pedigree of Millennium Wind (USA), 1998
| Sire Cryptoclearance (USA) 1984 | Fappiano (USA); 1977 | Mr. Prospector | Raise a Native |
| Sire Cryptoclearance (USA) 1984 | Fappiano (USA); 1977 | Mr. Prospector | Gold Digger |
| Sire Cryptoclearance (USA) 1984 | Fappiano (USA); 1977 | Killaloe | Dr. Fager |
| Sire Cryptoclearance (USA) 1984 | Fappiano (USA); 1977 | Killaloe | Grand Splendor |
| Sire Cryptoclearance (USA) 1984 | Naval Orange (USA); 1975 | Hoist The Flag | Tom Rolfe |
| Sire Cryptoclearance (USA) 1984 | Naval Orange (USA); 1975 | Hoist The Flag | Wavy Navy |
| Sire Cryptoclearance (USA) 1984 | Naval Orange (USA); 1975 | Mock Orange | Dedicate |
| Sire Cryptoclearance (USA) 1984 | Naval Orange (USA); 1975 | Mock Orange | Alablue |
| Dam Bali Babe (USA) 1980 | Drone (USA); 1966 | Sir Gaylord | Turn-To |
| Dam Bali Babe (USA) 1980 | Drone (USA); 1966 | Sir Gaylord | Somethingroyal |
| Dam Bali Babe (USA) 1980 | Drone (USA); 1966 | Cap And Bells | Tom Fool |
| Dam Bali Babe (USA) 1980 | Drone (USA); 1966 | Cap And Bells | Ghazni |
| Dam Bali Babe (USA) 1980 | Polynesian Charm (USA); 1972 | What a Pleasure | Bold Ruler |
| Dam Bali Babe (USA) 1980 | Polynesian Charm (USA); 1972 | What a Pleasure | Grey Flight |
| Dam Bali Babe (USA) 1980 | Polynesian Charm (USA); 1972 | Grass Shack | Polynesian |
| Dam Bali Babe (USA) 1980 | Polynesian Charm (USA); 1972 | Grass Shack | Good Example |
