= Point Given =

American-bred Thoroughbred racehorse (1988–2023)

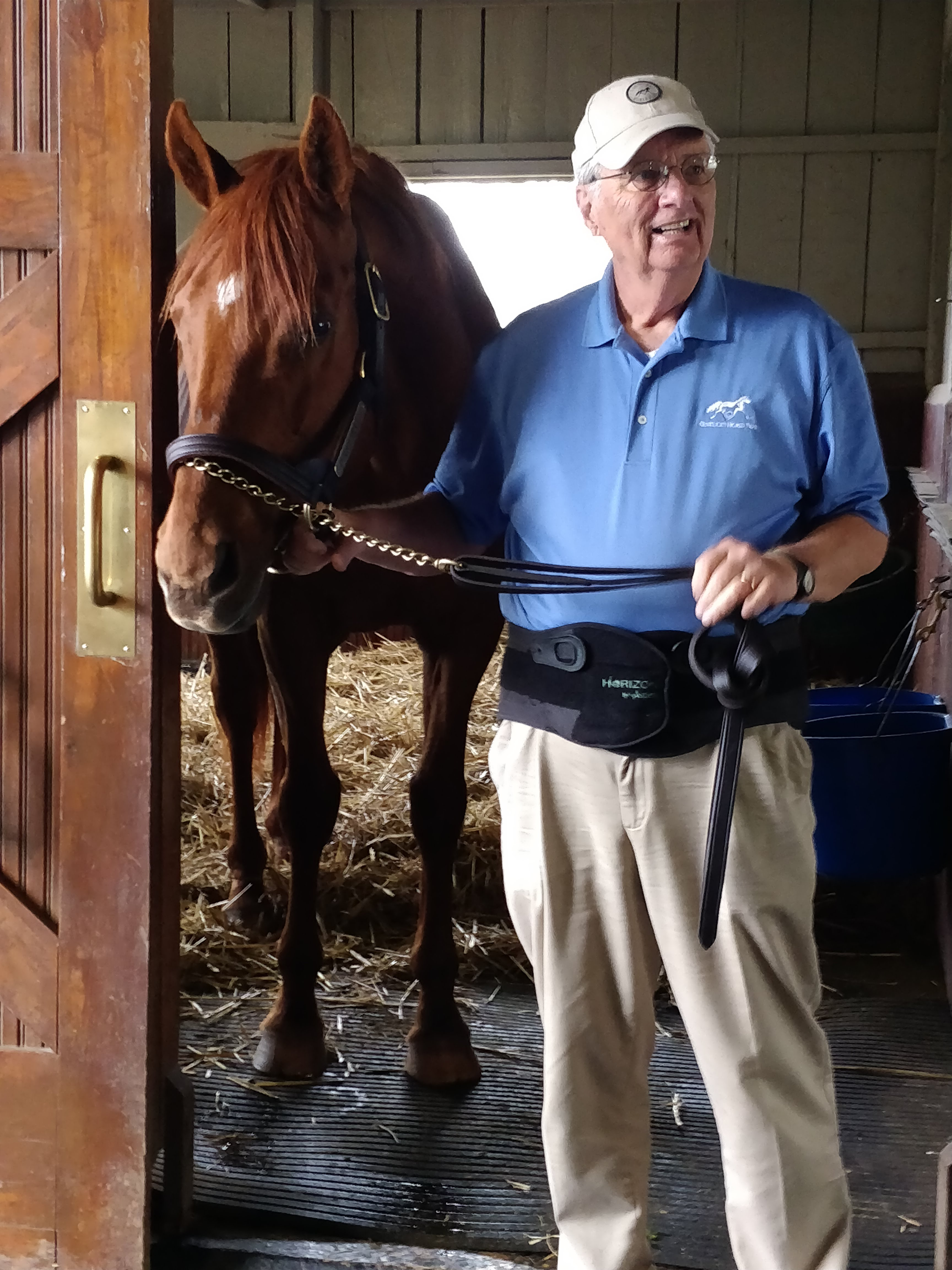
- Point Given at the Kentucky Horse Park, 2018
- Sire: Thunder Gulch
- Grandsire: Gulch
- Dam: Turko's Turn
- Damsire: Turkoman
- Sex: Stallion
- Foaled: March 27, 1998
- Died: September 11, 2023 (aged 25); Kentucky Horse Park; Lexington, Kentucky, U.S.
- Country: United States
- Colour: Chestnut
- Breeder: The Thoroughbred Corp.
- Owner: The Thoroughbred Corp.
- Trainer: Bob Baffert
- Record: 13: 9–3–0
- Earnings: $3,968,500

Major wins
- Kentucky Cup Juvenile Stakes (2000); Hollywood Futurity (2000); San Felipe Stakes (2001); Santa Anita Derby (2001); Haskell Invitational Handicap (2001); Travers Stakes (2001); Triple Crown race wins: Preakness Stakes (2001); Belmont Stakes (2001)

Awards
- U.S. Champion 3-Yr-Old Colt (2001); American Horse of the Year (2001)

Honours
- United States Racing Hall of Fame inductee (2010)

Point Given (March 27, 1998 – September 11, 2023) was an American-bred Thoroughbred racehorse who was the 2001 American Horse of the Year. That year, he won the Preakness Stakes, Belmont Stakes, Haskell Invitational, and Travers Stakes, becoming the first horse ever to win four $1 million races in a row. The only time he finished out of the money was in the 2001 Kentucky Derby, where he ran fifth. Point Given was inducted into the National Museum of Racing and Hall of Fame in 2010.

== Background ==
Point Given was bred in Kentucky by The Thoroughbred Corp, owned by Prince Ahmed bin Salman. He was sired by dual Classic winner Thunder Gulch and was produced by the stakes-winning mare Turko's Turn, by Turkoman. Turko's Turn was named the 2001 Kentucky Broodmare of the Year.

Point Given was a chestnut horse who stood 17.1 hands (69 inches, 175 cm) high. Although his conformation was generally excellent, he was known for his small, somewhat thin-soled feet. He was called "The Big Red Train" or "T-Rex" by his trainer Bob Baffert, the latter in recognition of his occasional bad behavior.

== Racing career ==
=== 2000: two-year-old season ===
Point Given made his debut on August 12, 2000, in a maiden special weight race at Del Mar, finishing second. He then broke his maiden in his next start on August 26. On September 16, he stepped up into graded stakes company in the Kentucky Cup Juvenile Stakes at Turfway Park. He reared up at the start and was far back during the early running but made a wide move turning into the stretch and drew off to win by 3 1/2 lengths.

Point Given's next start was in the Champagne Stakes at Belmont Park on October 14. He broke in fourth place and then moved to the lead after half a mile. He was soon joined by Trailthefox and the two completed six furlongs in 1:09.55. Turning for home, the rest of the field started to close and Yonaguska took the lead. Point Given battled back and started to pull clear of Yonaguska, only to be passed in the final strides by a fast-closing A P Valentine.

On November 4, Point Given entered the Breeders' Cup Juvenile, held that year at Churchill Downs. He broke poorly from post position 1 and was in tenth place moving into the first turn, then fell even further back down the backstretch, trailing by over 10 lengths with less than a half mile remaining in the race. In the final turn, jockey Gary Stevens swung him extremely wide to get racing room. Point Given closed rapidly down the stretch but came up a nose short to Macho Uno in a photo finish. "There was a ton of traffic going on in front of me", said Stevens. "There was a lot of bumping and jostling and when I got him going, I just wanted to keep him out of trouble."

Point Given finished his two-year-old campaign in the Hollywood Futurity at Hollywood Park on December 16. He trailed early but then moved to the lead down the backstretch and won easily. "He wasn't running at all", said Stevens. "He was gearing himself down and just absolutely playing with 'em."

Point Given was a finalist at the 2000 Eclipse Awards but finished second in the voting to Macho Uno for Champion Two-Year-Old honors.

=== 2001: three-year-old season ===
After a brief layoff, Point Given returned in the San Felipe Stakes at Santa Anita Park on March 17, 2001, a relatively late start for a horse on the Triple Crown trail. Baffert faced some criticism for leaving no margin for error, and Stevens admitted that they were feeling the tension. Point Given though behaved professionally throughout the race. He sat back off the early pace then made a strong move down the stretch and drew off to win by 2 1/4 lengths. He made his next start on April 7 in the Santa Anita Derby as the heavy favorite. On a muddy track, he pressed the early pace then took command on the far turn for an easy win by 5 1/2 lengths.

Point Given was made the favorite for the 2001 Kentucky Derby on May 5 but gave his supporters cause for concern when he reared several times after a routine gallop on the morning of the race. His exercise rider Pepe Aragon held on "like a gerbil hanging on to a piece of PVC pipe" and the horse was unharmed. During the race however, Point Given came up flat and could only finish fifth behind Monarchos. Stevens later attributed the loss to a combination of a foot infection the colt had suffered earlier that week and the extremely fast racing surface at Churchill Downs, which made the foot more sensitive.

In the Preakness Stakes on May 19, Point Given made a three-wide move around the final turn and then battled with Congaree for first place. He failed to switch leads when they entered the stretch and lugged in towards the rail as he inched past Congaree. He finally switched leads in the final 70 yards and pulled away to win by 2 1/2 lengths.

In the week leading up to the Belmont, Point Given started acting up again. He cut himself over the eye while "trying to kill himself" in his stall. After receiving stitches, the medication made him start acting colicky so Baffert withheld his hay to avoid making the stomach problems worse. Point Given became so hungry that he crawled under the webbing in his stall, gashing himself in the side in the process. He was briefly loose from his stall, but was then caught by the grooms.

His performance in the Belmont Stakes was unaffected by these antics. Instead, he turned in a dominating performance to win by 12 1/4 lengths in a time of 2:26.56 for 1 1/2 miles, tied for the fourth fastest time in the history of the race. He pressed the early pace, went to the lead on the backstretch and continued to open up all the way around the track, under continued urging from Stevens. "He was actually idling with me a little bit the last eighth of a mile, that's why I kept up at him," said Stevens. "It was important for everybody to see how good he is."

Point Given was given some time off to recover from cracked heels. He returned on August 5 in the Haskell Invitational, which had its purse increased to $1.5 million to attract the horse. Before a record crowd, Point Given went off at odds of 3–10 despite conceding up to nine pounds to his rivals. He raced near the back of the field for the first half mile and then started his move on the far turn. He was slower than normal to accelerate though and was still only third in mid stretch. Under strong urging from Stevens, he finally hit the lead in the final strides, winning by half a length. "He's never been in a battle like this before," said Stevens, "and he built some character today."

Point Given made what would be his final start in the Travers Stakes on August 25 at the Saratoga Race Course . He raced with E Dubai on the outside of the early leader, Free of Love. When Free of Love tired on the far turn, E Dubai went to the lead with Point Given poised to his outside. In the stretch, Point Given drew away a 3 1/2 length win. "I still don't think you've seen the best of him", said Stevens. "He knows he's great", said Baffert. "He's cool."

Point Given was the first horse since 1967 to win the Preakness Stakes, Belmont, and Travers Stakes, joining an elite club of racing greats who achieved that triple: Duke of Magenta (1878), Man o' War (1920), Whirlaway (1941), Native Dancer (1953), and Damascus (1967). He was the first horse to ever win four $1 million races in a row.

Point Given was the unanimous selection at the Eclipse Awards for American Champion-Three-Year Old Colt. He also prevailed over Tiznow for Horse of the Year honors.

== Race record ==
| Date | Age | Distance | Surface (condition) | Race | Grade | Track | Odds | Field | Finish | Winning time | Winning (losing) margin | Jockey | Ref |
|---|---|---|---|---|---|---|---|---|---|---|---|---|---|
| Aug 12, 2000 | 2 | 5 1/2 furlongs | Dirt (Fast) | Maiden Special Weight | Maiden | Del Mar Fairgrounds | 19.00 | 11 | 2 | 1:04.16 | (5 1/2 lengths) | Yutaka Take | |
| Aug 26, 2000 | 2 | 7 furlongs | Dirt (Fast) | Maiden Special Weight | Maiden | Del Mar Fairgrounds | *1.20 | 7 | 1 | 1:23.43 | 2 lengths | Victor Espinoza | |
| Sep 16, 2000 | 2 | 1 1/16 miles | Dirt (Fast) | Kentucky Cup Juvenile Stakes | III | Turfway Park | 3.30 | 11 | 1 | 1:47.01 | 3 1/2 lengths | Shane Sellers | |
| Oct 14, 2000 | 2 | 1 1/16 miles | Dirt (Fast) | Champagne Stakes | I | Belmont Park | 4.60 | 10 | 2 | 1:41.45 | (1 3/4 lengths) | Kent Desormeaux | |
| Nov 4, 2000 | 2 | 1 1/16 miles | Dirt (Fast) | Breeders' Cup Juvenile Stakes | I | Churchill Downs | 8.10 | 14 | 2 | 1:42.05 | (nose) | Gary Stevens | |
| Dec 16, 2000 | 2 | 1 1/16 miles | Dirt (Fast) | Hollywood Futurity | I | Hollywood Park | *0.30 | 4 | 1 | 1:42.21 | 1 length | Gary Stevens | |
| Mar 17, 2001 | 3 | 1 1/16 miles | Dirt (Fast) | San Felipe Stakes | II | Santa Anita Park | *0.40 | 8 | 1 | 1:41.94 | 2 1/4 lengths | Gary Stevens | |
| Apr 7, 2001 | 3 | 1 1/8 miles | Dirt (Wet fast) | Santa Anita Derby | I | Santa Anita Park | *0.70 | 6 | 1 | 1:47.77 | 5 1/2 lengths | Gary Stevens | |
| May 5, 2001 | 3 | 1 1/4 miles | Dirt (Fast) | Kentucky Derby | I | Churchill Downs | *1.80 | 17 | 5 | 1:59.97 | (11 3/4 lengths) | Gary Stevens | |
| May 19, 2001 | 3 | 1 3/16 miles | Dirt (Fast) | Preakness Stakes | I | Pimlico Race Course | *2.30 | 11 | 1 | 1:55.41 | 2 1/4 lengths | Gary Stevens | |
| Jun 9, 2001 | 3 | 1 1/2 miles | Dirt (Fast) | Belmont Stakes | I | Belmont Park | *1.35 | 9 | 1 | 2.26.56 | 12 1/4 lengths | Gary Stevens | |
| Aug 5, 2001 | 3 | 1 1/8 miles | Dirt (Fast) | Haskell Invitational Handicap | I | Monmouth Park | *0.30 | 6 | 1 | 1:49.77 | 1/2 length | Gary Stevens | |
| Aug 25, 2001 | 3 | 1 1/4 miles | Dirt (Fast) | Travers Stakes | I | Saratoga Race Course | *0.65 | 9 | 1 | 2:01.40 | 3 1/2 lengths | Gary Stevens | |

== Retirement ==
One week after his victory in the Travers Stakes, Point Given was found to have a strained tendon that ended his racing career. He was retired to stand at stud at Three Chimneys Farm in Midway, Kentucky, for an initial fee of $125,000. He was subsequently syndicated (offered for ownership by numerous owners) for $50 million, the third highest price in history (behind Fusaichi Pegasus at $60 million and Big Brown at something over $50 million).

In 2013, Point Given was relocated to Calumet Farm in Lexington, Kentucky. His stud fee for 2017 was $5,000. During his stud career, Point Given sired two champions (Canadian Horse of the Year Sealy Hill and Points of Grace) and 15 graded stakes winners, including Grade I winners Coil, Point Ashley and Go Between.

In November 2017, Calumet announced that Point Given was being pensioned from stud duties and would be relocated to the Kentucky Horse Park. Starting in April 2018, he was to be available for viewing by the public in the Hall of Champions.

Point Given was voted into the National Museum of Racing and Hall of Fame in 2010.

Point Given died on September 11, 2023, at age 25.

== Pedigree ==
Pedigree of Point Given, chestnut horse, foaled March 27, 1998
| Sire Thunder Gulch | Gulch | Mr. Prospector | Raise a Native |
| Sire Thunder Gulch | Gulch | Mr. Prospector | Gold Digger |
| Sire Thunder Gulch | Gulch | Jameela | Rambunctious |
| Sire Thunder Gulch | Gulch | Jameela | Asbury Mary |
| Sire Thunder Gulch | Line of Thunder | Storm Bird | Northern Dancer |
| Sire Thunder Gulch | Line of Thunder | Storm Bird | South Ocean |
| Sire Thunder Gulch | Line of Thunder | Shoot A Line | High Line |
| Sire Thunder Gulch | Line of Thunder | Shoot A Line | Death Ray |
| Dam Turko's Turn | Turkoman | Alydar | Raise a Native |
| Dam Turko's Turn | Turkoman | Alydar | Sweet Tooth |
| Dam Turko's Turn | Turkoman | Taba | Table Play |
| Dam Turko's Turn | Turkoman | Taba | Filipina |
| Dam Turko's Turn | Turbo Launch | Relaunch | In Reality |
| Dam Turko's Turn | Turbo Launch | Relaunch | Foggy Note |
| Dam Turko's Turn | Turbo Launch | David's Tobin | Tobin Bronze |
| Dam Turko's Turn | Turbo Launch | David's Tobin | Restless Love (family 2-n) |
