= 2001 Kentucky Derby =

Horse race

127th Kentucky Derby
- Kentucky Derby
- Location: Churchill Downs
- Date: May 5, 2001
- Distance: 1 1/4 mi (10 furlongs; 2,012 m)
- Winning horse: Monarchos
- Jockey: Jorge Chavez
- Trainer: John T. Ward, Jr.
- Owner: John C. Oxley
- Conditions: Fast
- Surface: Dirt
- Attendance: 154,210

The 2001 Kentucky Derby was the 127th running of the Kentucky Derby. The race took place on May 5, 2001. There was a crowd of 154,210 in attendance. The 127th Kentucky Derby was the first to be broadcast on NBC, garnering a Nielsen rating of 8.1.

== Monarchos’ position during the race ==
Throughout the race, Monarchos was never in the front of the pack. Coming into the final quarter mile, he was 13th. The jockey of Monarchos, Jorge Chavez, swept past all of the horses in front to score a four and three quarters length victory over the second-place horse. Monarchos finished in the second-fastest winning time in Kentucky Derby history: 1:59 97.

== Background information on trainer and jockey ==
The trainer of Monarchos John T. Ward Jr. was born and raised in Lexington, Kentucky. He had attended and graduated from the University of Kentucky before he began his journey as a trainer. Prior to the Kentucky Derby, Chavez and Ward had competed in two races in Florida. They had placed 2nd in the Wood Memorial race before placing first in the Florida Derby. Come time for the Kentucky Derby, there was a lot of criticism and excitement behind the team for Monarchos. Despite the backlash they were receiving, Chavez and his trainer Ward won their first ever Kentucky Derby.

== Monarchos accusations ==
After Monarchos crossed the finish line to win the Derby, the second place jockey Velazquez claimed that he was bumped into around the final turn. This accusation was later proven false and Chavez was given the bed of roses along with the victory. During an interview with Velazquez, he had admitted that Monarchos never hit him but did get in his way. "The winner was the best horse in the race. This is the Derby and I had to take a shot. I probably wouldn't claim foul in any other race" Velazquez said.

== Economic effect ==
The Kentucky Derby does not only change the lives of the jockey but also the commonwealth of Kentucky. The 2001 Derby specifically raised over $218 Billion for the economy of Kentucky. The overall wagering of this Derby rose to a record $107,589,904.

== Monarchos ==
Monarchos was a champions American Thoroughbred Stallion horse, and was born on February 9, 1998, in the United States. At the end of his career, his total earnings came to be $1,720,830, with an overall record of 10: 4–1–3.

== Field ==
In order to qualify, any horse that was to be nominated had to be three years old. An entry fee of $15,000 was levied against all nominations. Colts were not permitted to carry more than 126 pounds, and Fillies were not permitted to carry more than 121 pounds. A total of 441 horses were nominated to enter into the 2001 Kentucky Derby.

== Race description ==
Monarchos, bumped by Point Given at the start and forced in on Jamaican Rum, was outrun for six furlongs. He raced five or six wide, commenced a sweeping run five abreast on the second turn to come out a bit further entering the stretch. Monarchos caught Congaree approaching the final sixteenth and drew clear under steady left-handed encouragement. Invisible Ink, unhurried to the far turn, moved up between foes approaching the stretch and angled outside the winner to secure room in the upper stretch. Invisible Ink couldn't menace Monarchos, but closed with good determination to wear down Congaree for a second. Congaree, in hand early while tracking the leaders four or five wide, accelerated to the front about the five-sixteenths pole, and settled into the stretch with a clear advantage. Congaree showed the way into the final furlong but weakened gradually thereafter.

Thunder Blitz, bumped at the start when Balto Star came out, was outrun to the far turn while along the inside. He angled between rivals soon after while advancing, split foes approaching the final quarter, then improved position with a mild late run. Thunder Blitz returned bleeding from the mouth. Point Given broke to the inside bumping the winner, moved up steadily to gain a striking position five wide on the backstretch. Point Given made a threatening run on the second turn, but then flattened out when straightened for the drive.

Jamaican Rum, bumped at the start and squeezed back. Jamaican Rum was outrun for seven furlongs while racing well off the inside, leaned in while advancing six wide tightening it up on Dollar Bill at the three-eighths pole, then closed some ground while not a threat. A P Valentine, in behind rivals while unhurried into the backstretch, was checked when bumped by Talk Is Money at the half-mile ground, steadied between foes and was shuffled back at the three-eighths pole and rallied belatedly.

Express tour settled in a striking position while near the inside between foes on the backstretch, and made a menacing run after angling out slightly on the second turn. Express Tour then failed to sustain the needed momentum. Fifty Stars, outrun until the stretch while in behind rivals, angled out at the eighth pole but wasn't a factor. Startac failed to reach contention and was eight wide on the second turn and into the stretch. Millennium Wind, forwardly placed along the rail, was checked behind Songandaprayer, about the five-sixteenths pole and failed to threaten thereafter.

Arctic Boy, squeezed a bit at the start, failed to threaten. Songandaprayer was hustled to the front along the rail soon after the start, and made the pace under pressure to the second turn, then tired from the effort. Balto Star forced the pace between rivals for seven furlongs and gave way. Dollar Bill, angled in behind horses soon after the start, eased out a bit on the backstretch, and was forced to take up sharply. Dollar Bill then lost his action at the three-eighths pole when in tight quarters and was finished. Keats pressed the leaders three wide to the far turn and gave way thereafter. Talk is Money exchanged bumps with A P Valentine leaving the half-mile ground, gave way soon after and was distanced before going a mile and eased through the stretch. A foul claim by the rider of Invisible Ink against the winner for alleged interference at the quarter-mile ground was disallowed.

Monarchos finished 4 3/4 lengths in front of Invisible Ink, who was a nose ahead of Congaree. Thunder Blitz ran fourth.

It was the second-fastest winning time in the Kentucky Derby, and the first year time was extended to hundredths instead of fifths. The 1:59.97 would have been equivalent to a 2:00.0 time in previous years.

== Payout ==
The 127th Kentucky Derby Payout Schedule

Program Number	Horse Name	Win	Place	Show
16	Monarchos	$23.00	$11.80	$8.80
13	Invisible Ink	-	$46.60	$21.20
8	Congaree	-	-	$7.20

- $2 Exacta: (16-13) Paid $1,229.00
- $2 Trifecta: (16-13-8) Paid $12,238.40
- $1 Superfecta: (16-13-8-4) Paid $62,986.90

== Full results ==
Finished	Post	Horse	Jockey	Trainer	Owner	Time / behind
1st	16	Monarchos	Jorge Chavez	John T. Ward, Jr.	John C. Oxley	1:59.97
2nd	13	Invisible Ink	John Velazquez	Todd Pletcher	John Fort	
3rd	8	Congaree	Victor Espinoza	Bob Baffert	Stonerside Stable	
4th	4	Thunder Blitz	Edgar Prado	Joe Orseno	Stronach Stables	
5th	17	Point Given	Gary Stevens	Bob Baffert	The Thoroughbred Corp.	
6th	15	Jamaican Rum	Eddie Delahoussaye	James Cassidy	Southern Nevada Racing Stables	
7th	9	A P Valentine	Corey Nakatani	Nick Zito	Celtic Pride Stable	
8th	6	Express Tour	David R. Flores	Saeed bin Suroor	A. Clare Silva Jr.	
9th	5	Fifty Stars	Donnie Meche	Steve Asmussen	Ryco Equine Pty Ltd	
10th	12	Startac	Alex Solis	Simon Bray	Allen E. Paulson Living Trust	
11th	2	Millennium Wind	Laffit Pincay, Jr.	David Hofmans	David Heerinsperger	
12th	7	Arctic Boy	Calvin Borel	Timothy F. Ritchey		
13th	1	Songandaprayer	Aaron Gryder	John Dowd	Bob Hurley	
14th	3	Balto Star	Mark Guidry	Todd Pletcher	Anstu Stables Inc.	
15th	10	Dollar Bill	Pat Day	Dallas Stewart	Gary West Stables Inc.	
16th	14	Keats	Larry Melancon	Niall M. O'Callaghan	Ballymore Stables	
17th	11	Talk Is Money	Jerry Bailey	John Scanlan	Dan Borislow	
