= World FreeFall Convention =

American sporting event

The World Free Fall Convention (WFFC) was a skydiving event held annually from 1990 to 2006. From 1990 to 2001, it was held in Quincy, Illinois and from 2002 to 2006 in Rantoul, Illinois. The convention included various categories of jump, such as sky surfing, raft jumping, and naked jumps, with a wide variety of aircraft involved. The event was cancelled in 2007.

== Statistics ==
In 1999, the convention drew 5,410 registrations, including people from across the United States and 52 other countries. During a 10-day period, there were over 65,000 jumps made, 503 of which were tandem jumps. 84 AFS students passed, 393 kegs were given away, and $30,855 was raised for various charities.

== Registration ==
Registration was $49 for jumpers and $24 for non jumpers. The fee included camping, seminars, hot showers, nightly entertainment, and beer.

== Safety ==
In order to be registered as a skydiver, participants were preferred to have a USPA "B" license. If they did not, they were required to have performed at least 50 verified freefall skydives. Skydivers who did not meet these requirements were reportedly required to jump with a WFFC Student vendor.

Jerry Loftis, a prominent skydiver, was killed during the 1998 convention when his parachute failed to open properly. During its years at Quincy, the WFFC was associated with about 11 skydiving-related deaths, according to a spokeswoman in 2002, after a man was killed instantly when he was clipped by helicopter blades as the vehicle took off.
