= John C. Oxley =

American oilman and racehorse breeder

- Born: January 24, 1937 (age 88); Tulsa, Oklahoma, U.S.
- Occupation(s): Oxley Resources, LLC, Fawn Leap Farm
- Board member of: Oxley Resources LLC, The Jockey Club, United States Polo Association
- Spouse: Debby
- Children: Randy, Mary Anne, Tracey
- Parent(s): John T. Oxley; Mary Katheryn Yetter
- Honors: Polo Hall of Fame (2005); Keeneland Mark of Distinction (2005)

John C. Oxley, a.k.a. "Jack", (born 1937) is an American oilman, horse breeder and polo player.

== Biography ==
=== Early life ===
John C. Oxley was born on January 24, 1937, in Tulsa, Oklahoma. His father was John T. Oxley, a polo player.

=== Polo ===
A five-goal player, he won U.S. Open Polo Championship in 1983, the Cowdray Park Gold Cup with the Boca Raton team in 1970, the C.V. Whitney Cup, the Rolex Gold Cup, the America Cup, the Monty Waterbury Cup, the Pacific Coast Open, the 12 and 16 Goal Championships, three Chairman's Cups, the Butler Handicap, the North American Cup and numerous Sunshine League titles.

In 1985, he received the Hugo Dalmar Award. He served as president of the United States Polo Association, and as its Chairman from 1988 to 1991. He was inducted into the Museum of Polo and Hall of Fame on February 18, 2005.

Together with his brother Thomas, he co-owns the Royal Palm Polo Sports Club in Boca Raton, Florida founded by his late father.

=== Thoroughbred breeding ===
As a Thoroughbred racehorse owner and breeder, he won the 2001 Kentucky Derby with Monarchos and owned Beautiful Pleasure, the 1999 American Champion Older Female Horse and winner of the Breeders' Cup Distaff.

=== Philanthropy ===
He is a trustee of the Oxley Foundation, which donates to polo players and schools. It has also donated US$1 million to the Grayson-Jockey Club Research Foundation, where John Oxley is a board member.
