= Monarchos =

American-bred Thoroughbred racehorse

- Sire: Maria's Mon
- Grandsire: Wavering Monarch
- Dam: Regal Band
- Damsire: Dixieland Band
- Sex: Stallion
- Foaled: February 9, 1998
- Died: October 22, 2016 (aged 18)
- Country: USA
- Colour: Gray
- Breeder: James D. Squires
- Owner: John C. Oxley
- Trainer: John T. Ward Jr.
- Record: 10: 4-1-3
- Earnings: $1,720,830

Major wins
- Florida Derby (2001); Kentucky Derby (2001)
- Last updated on October 2, 2006

Monarchos (February 9, 1998 – October 22, 2016) was a champion American Thoroughbred racehorse who won the 2001 Kentucky Derby in the second fastest winning time and overall third fastest time in the race's history.

== Background ==
Monarchos was sired by Maria's Mon– from whom he inherited his gray coat– out of the mare Regal Band. He was bred by Jim Squires, who wrote an account of this "rags to riches" horse entitled "Horse of a Different Colour". As a two-year-old in training, he was purchased for $170,000 by John C. Oxley on the advice of the colt's trainer, John Ward.

== Racing career ==
Monarchos raced twice as a two-year-old, finishing eighth at Keeneland Racetrack on October 7, and third at Churchill Downs on November 24.

He made a winning three-year-old debut when taking a minor race at Gulfstream Park in January 2001 and followed up with a win in an allowance race in February. He established himself as a contender for the Kentucky Derby with his run in the Florida Derby in March. Ridden by Jorge Chavez, he won by four and a half lengths from Outofthebox and Invisible Ink. Chavez was impressed by the performance, saying that "when I asked him, he just exploded." Bill Nack, writing in Sports Illustrated, was equally enthusiastic, calling the win "electrifying" and drawing comparisons with other famous grays such as Spectacular Bid and Holy Bull.

In his final race before the Derby, Monarchos finished second to Congaree in the Wood Memorial Stakes. However, Ward described the race as "a perfect prep". At Churchill Downs on 5 May, Monarchos was the 10.5/1 fourth choice in the betting for the Derby. After being bumped at the start, he made steady progress on the outside and turned into the straight in sixth place. Chavez sent the gray colt to the lead a furlong from the finish, and Monarchos pulled clear to win by almost five lengths from Invisible Ink, with Congaree third and the favored Point Given fifth.

Monarchos' winning time was 1:59.97 for 1 1/4 miles, becoming only the third horse in Derby history to finish the race in under 2 minutes, joining 1973 Triple Crown winner Secretariat, who ran 1:59 2/5, and his runner up, Sham, who ran 1:59 4/5 (at that time, the Derby was timed to the fifth of a second rather than to the hundredth of a second). As of 2025, no horse since Monarchos has broken the 2-minute barrier at the Derby.

In the Preakness Stakes, Monarchos was outrun in the early stages and finished sixth of the eleven runners behind Point Given. In the Belmont Stakes, he finished third, more than thirteen lengths behind the winner, Point Given. Some time after the race, it was discovered that Monarchos had sustained a hairline fracture to his right knee, which ruled him out for the rest of the season.

Monarchos was scheduled to return as a four-year-old with the Donn Handicap as his first target, but, after running third in a prep race, he injured a tendon in training in January 2002 and was retired.

== Stud career ==
Monarchos was retired to Claiborne Farm, where his initial stud fee was $25,000. His most successful foals are Informed Decision, a winner of the Breeders' Cup Filly and Mare Sprint and a multiple graded stakes winner of $2.2 million, and Win Willy, winner of the Rebel Stakes and one-time Kentucky Derby contender, winner of over $1 million. Other stakes winners include Japanese stakes winner Mr. Monarchos ($775k), multiple stakes winner Stormin Monarcho ($487k), multiple stakes winner Bingham, stakes winners Riley's Monarch and Stones River, Aces Star (Champion 2yo colt in Scandinavia) and others.

Monarchos stood at Nuckols Farm in Midway, Kentucky, at a fee of $2,000 for 2016.

In April 2011, Monarchos underwent surgery for colic at the Hagyard Equine Medical Institute.

On October 22, 2016, Monarchos died after undergoing surgery to repair a ruptured intestine. He went into surgery after showing signs of internal distress the night before. He was 18 years old at the time of his death.

== Pedigree ==
Pedigree of Monarchos (USA), gray stallion, 1998
Sire Maria's Mon (USA) 1993	Wavering Monarch; 1979	Majestic Light	Majestic Prince
Sire Maria's Mon (USA) 1993	Wavering Monarch; 1979	Majestic Light	Irradiate
Sire Maria's Mon (USA) 1993	Wavering Monarch; 1979	Uncommitted	Buckpasser
Sire Maria's Mon (USA) 1993	Wavering Monarch; 1979	Uncommitted	Lady Be Good
Sire Maria's Mon (USA) 1993	Carlotta Maria; 1984	Caro	Fortino
Sire Maria's Mon (USA) 1993	Carlotta Maria; 1984	Caro	Chambord
Sire Maria's Mon (USA) 1993	Carlotta Maria; 1984	Water Malone	Naskra
Sire Maria's Mon (USA) 1993	Carlotta Maria; 1984	Water Malone	Gray Matter
Dam Regal Band (USA) 1987	Dixieland Band; 1980	Northern Dancer	Nearctic
Dam Regal Band (USA) 1987	Dixieland Band; 1980	Northern Dancer	Natalma
Dam Regal Band (USA) 1987	Dixieland Band; 1980	Mississippi Mud	Delta Judge
Dam Regal Band (USA) 1987	Dixieland Band; 1980	Mississippi Mud	Sand Buggy
Dam Regal Band (USA) 1987	Regal Roberta; 1980	Roberto	Hail To Reason
Dam Regal Band (USA) 1987	Regal Roberta; 1980	Roberto	Bramalea
Dam Regal Band (USA) 1987	Regal Roberta; 1980	Regal Road	Graustark
Dam Regal Band (USA) 1987	Regal Roberta; 1980	Regal Road	On the Trail
